= 2009–10 Northampton Town F.C. season =

Northampton Town
2009–10 season
- Chairman: David Cardoza
- Manager: Stuart Gray (until 8 September); Ian Sampson (from 5 October)
- League Two: 11th
- FA Cup: Second round
- League Cup: First round
- Legaue Trophy: Quarter-final
- Top goalscorer: League: Adebayo Akinfenwa (16); All: Adebayo Akinfenwa (17)
- Highest home attendance: 5,069 vs Notts County
- Lowest home attendance: 1,718 vs Bournemouth

The 2009–10 season was Northampton Town's 113th season in their history and the first season back in League Two after relegation the previous year. Alongside competing in League Two, the club also participated in the FA Cup, League Cup and Football League Trophy. The team's new shirt supplier was Erreà, and the shirt sponsor was Jackson Grundy.

== Players ==
As of match played 8 May 2010.

No.	Name	Position	Nat.	Place of birth	Date of birth (age)	Apps	Goals	Previous club	Date signed	Fee
Goalkeepers
1	Chris Dunn	GK	(England)	Havering	23 October 1987 (aged 22)	66	0	Apprentice	22 April 2006	N/A
13	Paul Walker	GK	(Wales)	Cambridge (ENG)	18 April 1992 (aged 18)	0	0	Apprentice	30 August 2008	N/A
26	Jason Steele	GK	(England)	Newton Aycliffe	18 August 1990 (aged 19)	13	0	Middlesbrough	25 February 2010	Loan
Defenders
2	Paul Rodgers	RB	(England)	Edmonton	6 October 1989 (aged 20)	46	0	Arsenal	31 July 2009	Free
3	John Johnson	RB	(England)	Middlesbrough	16 September 1988 (aged 21)	38	5	Middlesbrough	24 September 2009	Loan
5	Craig Hinton	CB	(England)	Wolverhampton	26 November 1977 (aged 32)	46	0	Bristol Rovers	29 May 2009	Free
6	Dean Beckwith	CB	(England)	Southwark	18 September 1983 (aged 26)	42	0	Hereford United	29 June 2009	Free
19	John Curtis	U	(England)	Nuneaton	3 September 1978 (aged 31)	21	0	Wrexham	28 July 2009	Free
23	Peter Gilbert	LB	(Wales)	Newcastle upon Tyne (ENG)	31 July 1983 (aged 26)	31	0	Oldham Athletic	13 November 2009	Free
Midfielders
4	Luke Guttridge	CM	(England)	Barnstaple	27 March 1982 (aged 28)	63	9	Colchester United	4 August 2008	Free
8	Abdul Osman	CM	(Ghana)	Accra	27 February 1987 (aged 23)	73	4	Gretna	12 June 2008	Free
11	Andy Holt	LB/LM	(England)	Stockport	21 April 1978 (aged 32)	164	9	Wrexham	27 June 2006	Free
12	Ryan Gilligan	CM	(England)	Swindon	18 January 1987 (aged 23)	178	22	Watford	12 August 2005	Free
14	Liam Davis	LM	(England)	Wandsworth	23 November 1986 (aged 23)	53	6	Coventry City	6 June 2008	Free
15	Alex Dyer	CM	(England)	Täby (SWE)	11 June 1990 (aged 19)	42	3	Apprentice	1 July 2007	N/A
21	Michael Jacobs	W	(England)	Rothwell	4 November 1991 (aged 18)	2	0	Apprentice	1 July 2009	N/A
30	Kevin Thornton	RM	(Republic of Ireland)	Drogheda	9 July 1986 (aged 23)	11	1	Nuneaton Town	8 January 2010	Free
Forwards
9	Steve Guinan	FW	(England)	Birmingham	24 December 1974 (aged 35)	34	7	Hereford United	26 May 2009	Free
10	Adebayo Akinfenwa	FW	(England)	Islington	10 May 1982 (aged 27)	95	39	Millwall	18 January 2008	Free
16	Gary Mulligan	FW	(Republic of Ireland)	Dublin	23 April 1985 (aged 25)	12	0	Gillingham	8 July 2009	Free
17	Billy Mckay	FW	(Northern Ireland)	Corby (ENG)	22 October 1988 (aged 21)	43	8	Leicester City	21 July 2009	Free
18	Joe Benjamin	FW	(England)	Woodford	8 October 1990 (aged 19)	8	0	Apprentice	1 August 2008	N/A
22	Courtney Herbert	FW	(England)	Northampton	25 October 1988 (aged 21)	23	2	Long Buckby	23 September 2009	Free
24	Seb Harris	FW	(United States)	Rochester, Michigan	5 August 1987 (aged 22)	10	1	Michigan Bucks	3 August 2009	Free
28	Stephen O'Flynn	FW	(Republic of Ireland)	Mallow	27 April 1982 (aged 28)	5	0	Limerick	5 January 2010	Free

== Competitions ==
=== Football League Two ===
==== League table ====
Pos	Team	Pld	W	D	L	GF	GA	GD	Pts
9	Bury	46	19	12	15	54	59	−5	69
10	Port Vale	46	17	17	12	61	50	+11	68
11	Northampton Town	46	18	13	15	62	53	+9	67
12	Shrewsbury Town	46	17	12	17	55	54	+1	63
13	Burton Albion	46	17	11	18	71	71	0	62

Updated to match(es) played on unknown. Source: football-league.co.uk

==== Results summary ====
Overall								Home						Away					
Pld	W	D	L	GF	GA	GD	Pts	W	D	L	GF	GA	GD	W	D	L	GF	GA	GD
46	18	13	15	62	53	+9	67	9	9	5	29	21	+8	9	4	10	33	32	+1

As of games played 8 May 2010

==== League position by match ====
Round	1	2	3	4	5	6	7	8	9	10	11	12	13	14	15	16	17	18	19	20	21	22	23	24	25	26	27	28	29	30	31	32	33	34	35	36	37	38	39	40	41	42	43	44	45	46
Ground	H	A	A	H	A	H	A	H	A	H	H	A	H	A	A	H	H	A	H	A	H	H	A	A	A	H	A	H	A	H	H	A	A	H	A	H	H	A	A	H	H	A	A	H	A	H
Result	D	L	W	W	L	L	L	L	L	W	D	D	W	W	L	D	D	L	L	D	D	W	D	W	W	D	W	D	W	W	L	L	W	W	W	W	W	D	W	D	L	L	L	W	L	D
Position	15	19	10	5	12	13	17	21	22	17	19	19	17	15	16	15	16	18	18	18	20	18	18	16	13	14	12	13	11	8	9	12	8	8	8	7	7	8	6	8	9	10	11	10	11	11

Source: Northampton Town F.C.
A = Away; H = Home; W = Win; D = Draw; L = Loss

==== Matches ====
Win Draw Loss

8 August 2009 1	Northampton Town	0–0	Macclesfield Town	Northampton
15:00 BST		Report		Stadium: Sixfields Stadium; Attendance: 4,064; Referee: G Ward

15 August 2009 2	Chesterfield	1–0	Northampton Town	Chesterfield
15:00 BST	D.McDermott 32'	Report		Stadium: Saltergate; Attendance: 3,700; Referee: S Rushton

18 August 2009 3	Accrington Stanley	0–3	Northampton Town	Accrington
19:45 BST		Report	S.Guinan 3'; A.Akinfenwa 18' (pen.); B.Mckay 78'	Stadium: Fraser Eagle Stadium; Attendance: 1,561; Referee: S Bratt

22 August 2009 4	Northampton Town	2–0	Bournemouth	Northampton
15:00 BST	A.Akinfenwa 6'; B.Marshall 84'	Report		Stadium: Sixfields Stadium; Attendance: 4,102; Referee: P Taylor

29 August 2009 5	Burton Albion	3–2	Northampton Town	Burton upon Trent
15:00 BST	S.Harrad 2'; M.Simpson 7', 11'	Report	S.Guinan 72'; R.Gilligan 81' (pen.)	Stadium: Pirelli Stadium; Attendance: 3,321; Referee: R Shoebridge

4 September 2009 6	Northampton Town	1–3	Barnet	Northampton
19:45 BST	B.Marshall 30'	Report	A.Dean 51'; P.Furlong 68'; J.O'Flynn 71'	Stadium: Sixfields Stadium; Attendance: 4,206; Referee: Paul Tierney

12 September 2009 7	Notts County	5–2	Northampton Town	Nottingham
15:00 BST	M.Ritchie 23', 65'; L.Hughes 44', 61', 76' (pen.)	Report	A.Dyer 10'; A.Holt 89'	Stadium: Meadow Lane; Attendance: 7,154; Referee: Michael Oliver

19 September 2009 8	Northampton Town	1–2	Rochdale	Northampton
15:00 BST	R.Gilligan 64'	Report	C.O'Grady 19'; W.Buckley 68'	Stadium: Sixfields Stadium; Attendance: 4,048; Referee: D Sheldrake

26 September 2009 9	Shrewsbury Town	3–0	Northampton Town	Shrewsbury
15:00 BST	J.Robinson 22'; J.Labadie 49'; K.Langmead 54'	Report		Stadium: Prostar Stadium; Attendance: 5,548; Referee: Geoff Eltringham

29 September 2009 10	Northampton Town	3–1	Rotherham	Northampton
19:45 BST	R.Gilligan 10'; C.Herbert 46'; I.Sharps 58' (o.g.)	Report	A.Le Fondre 78' (pen.)	Stadium: Sixfields Stadium; Attendance: 4,017; Referee: Oliie Langford

3 October 2009 11	Northampton Town	2–2	Bradford City	Northampton
15:00 BST	A.Dyer 77'; J.Johnson 90'	Report	S.Ramsden 50'; M.Boulding 54'	Stadium: Sixfields Stadium; Attendance: 4,391; Referee: D Phillips

10 October 2009 12	Bury	2–2	Northampton Town	Manchester
15:00 BST	D.Worrall 29'; R.Lowe 33'	Report	C.Herbert 66'; A.Akinfenwa 73'	Stadium: Gigg Lane; Attendance: 2,863; Referee: P Quinn

17 October 2009 13	Northampton Town	1–0	Lincoln City	Northampton
15:00 BST	S.Guinan 72'	Report		Stadium: Sixfields Stadium; Attendance: 4,341; Referee: S Cook

24 October 2009 14	Morecambe	2–4	Northampton Town	Morecambe
15:00 BST	P.Jevons 26' (pen.); S.Drummond 40'	Report	S.Guinan 4'; A.Holt 70'; J.Johnson 79'; A.Akinfenwa 84'	Stadium: Christie Park; Attendance: 2,041; Referee: S Mathieson

29 October 2009 15	Torquay United	1–0	Northampton Town	Torquay
15:00 GMT	C.Hargreaves 82'	Report		Stadium: Plainmoor; Attendance: 2,732; Referee: P Gibbs

14 November 2009 16	Northampton Town	0–0	Grimsby Town	Northampton
15:00 GMT		Report		Stadium: Sixfields Stadium; Attendance: 4,341; Referee: Keith Stroud

21 November 2009 17	Northampton Town	2–2	Crewe Alexandra	Northampton
15:00 GMT	A.Akinfenwa 51', 62'	Report	C.Donaldson 14'; J.Johnson 43' (o.g.)	Stadium: Sixfields Stadium; Attendance: 5,069; Referee: G Horwood

24 November 2009 18	Aldershot Town	2–1	Northampton Town	Aldershot
19:45 GMT	S.Donnelly 80' (pen.); M.Morgan 90'	Report	L.Guttridge 18'	Stadium: Recreation Ground; Attendance: 2,761; Referee: F Graham

1 December 2009 19	Northampton Town	1–3	Hereford United	Northampton
19:45 GMT	R.Gilligan 1'	Report	D.Jones 16'; M.Manset 57'; C.King 74'	Stadium: Sixfields Stadium; Attendance: 3,524; Referee: D Sheldrake

5 December 2009 20	Cheltenham Town	2–2	Northampton Town	Cheltenham
15:00 GMT	B.Hayles 22', 30'	Report	A.Akinfenwa 23', 47'	Stadium: Whaddon Road; Attendance: 2,824; Referee: K Evans

12 December 2009 21	Northampton Town	1–1	Port Vale	Northampton
15:00 GMT	A.Akinfenwa 51' (pen.)	Report	M.Richards 45' (pen.)	Stadium: Sixfields Stadium; Attendance: 4,132; Referee: M Russell

22 December 2009 22	Northampton Town	1–0	Dagenham & Redbridge	Northampton
15:00 GMT	B.Mckay 88'	Report		Stadium: Sixfields Stadium; Attendance: 4,108; Referee: Jon Moss

28 December 2009 23	Barnet	0–0	Northampton Town	Barnet
15:00 GMT		Report		Stadium: Underhill; Attendance: 2,237; Referee: Carl Sarginson

2 January 2010 24	Bournemouth	0–2	Northampton Town	Bournemouth
15:00 GMT		Report	L.Guttridge 5'; R.Gilligan 16'	Stadium: Dean Court; Attendance: 5,715; Referee: Andy D'Urso

20 January 2010 25	Macclesfield Town	0–2	Northampton Town	Macclesfield
19:45 GMT		Report	L.Guttridge 23'; A.Akinfenwa 76'	Stadium: Moss Rose; Attendance: 1,035; Referee: D McDermid

23 January 2010 26	Northampton Town	0–0	Chesterfield	Northampton
15:00 GMT		Report		Stadium: Sixfields Stadium; Attendance: 4,513; Referee: J Waugh

26 January 2010 27	Darlington	1–2	Northampton Town	Darlington
19:45 GMT	T.Purcell 29'	Report	B.Mckay 55'; R.Gilligan 70'	Stadium: The Darlington Arena; Attendance: 1,694; Referee: M Boyeson

30 January 2010 28	Northampton Town	1–1	Burton Albion	Northampton
15:00 GMT	A.Holt 88'	Report	S.Harrad 53'	Stadium: Sixfields Stadium; Attendance: 4,552; Referee: A Hall

6 February 2010 29	Dagenham & Redbridge	0–1	Northampton Town	Dagenham
15:00 GMT		Report	J.Johnson 71'	Stadium: Victoria Road; Attendance: 2,206; Referee: S Hooper

9 February 2010 30	Northampton Town	4–0	Accrington Stanley	Northampton
19:45 GMT	A.Akinfenwa 10'; B.Mckay 57', 61'; L.Guttridge 64'	Report		Stadium: Sixfields Stadium; Attendance: 3,206; Referee: J Linnington

12 February 2010 31	Northampton Town	0–3	Aldershot Town	Northampton
19:45 GMT		Report	M.Morgan 12', 75'; K.Hudson 68'	Stadium: Sixfields Stadium; Attendance: 4,718; Referee: Grant Ward

20 February 2010 32	Crewe Alexandra	3–2	Northampton Town	Crewe
15:00 GMT	A.Westwood 16', 66'; S.Walton 69'	Report	R.Gilligan 45'; A.Akinfenwa 57'	Stadium: Gresty Road; Attendance: 4,036; Referee: P Quinn

23 February 2010 33	Hereford United	0–2	Northampton Town	Hereford
19:45 GMT		Report	B.Mckay 29'; A.Akinfenwa 67'	Stadium: Edgar Street; Attendance: 1,266; Referee: Graham Salisbury

27 February 2010 34	Northampton Town	2–1	Cheltenham Town	Northampton
15:00 GMT	A.Akinfenwa 52'; S.Harris 85'	Report	M.Watkins 78'	Stadium: Sixfields Stadium; Attendance: 4,428; Referee: Trevor Kettle

6 March 2010 35	Port Vale	1–3	Northampton Town	Burslem
15:00 GMT	D.Loft 5'	Report	A.Akinfenwa 3'; A.Osman 45'; B.Mckay 45'	Stadium: Vale Park; Attendance: 4,861; Referee: D Webb

13 March 2010 36	Northampton Town	2–0	Darlington	Northampton
15:00 GMT	J.Johnson 20'; A.Osman 39'	Report		Stadium: Sixfields Stadium; Attendance: 4,755; Referee: A Penn

20 March 2010 37	Northampton Town	2–0	Morecambe	Northampton
15:00 GMT	L.Davis 2'; R.Gilligan 51'	Report		Stadium: Sixfields Stadium; Attendance: 4,210; Referee: Graham Horwood

27 March 2010 38	Lincoln City	1–1	Northampton Town	Lincoln
15:00 GMT	M.Saunders 54'	Report	J.Johnson 84'	Stadium: Sincil Bank; Attendance: 3,964; Referee: Jon Moss

2 April 2010 39	Grimsby Town	1–2	Northampton Town	Cleethorpes
19:45 BST	M.Coulson 42'	Report	L.Davis 18'; A.Akinfenwa 68'	Stadium: Blundell Park; Attendance: 6,482; Referee: Anthony Taylor

5 April 2010 40	Northampton Town	0–0	Torquay United	Northampton
15:00 BST		Report		Stadium: Sixfields Stadium; Attendance: 5,515; Referee: Darren Deadman

10 April 2010 41	Northampton Town	0–1	Notts County	Northampton
15:00 BST		Report	B.Davies 47'	Stadium: Sixfields Stadium; Attendance: 5,647; Referee: Andy D'Urso

13 April 2010 42	Rotherham United	1–0	Northampton Town	Sheffield
19:45 BST	A.Le Fondre 65' (pen.)	Report		Stadium: Don Valley Stadium; Attendance: 3,325; Referee: E Evans

17 April 2010 43	Rochdale	1–0	Northampton Town	Rochdale
15:00 BST	C.O'Grady 23'	Report		Stadium: Spotland; Attendance: 5,025; Referee: A Haines

24 April 2010 44	Northampton Town	2–0	Shrewsbury Town	Northampton
15:00 BST	B.Mckay 54'; K.Thornton 82'	Report		Stadium: Sixfields Stadium; Attendance: 5,019; Referee: Sutton

1 May 2010 45	Bradford City	2–0	Northampton Town	Bradford
15:00 BST	G.Evans 12', 81'	Report		Stadium: Valley Parade; Attendance: 12,403; Referee: Graham Salisbury

8 May 2010 46	Northampton Town	1–1	Bury	Northampton
15:00 BST	A.Akinfenwa 90'	Report	R.Lowe 45'	Stadium: Sixfields Stadium; Attendance: 5,234; Referee: R Booth

=== FA Cup ===
7 November 2009 First round	Northampton Town	2–1	Fleetwood Town	Northampton
15:00 GMT	L.Guttridge 29', 61'	Report	S.Clancy 41'	Stadium: Sixfields Stadium; Attendance: 3,077; Referee: R Madley

28 November 2009 Second round	Northampton Town	2–3	Southampton	Northampton
15:00 GMT	D.Hammond 65' (o.g.); R.Gilligan 90'	Report	P.N'Diaye 41'; A.Lallana 43'; D.Hammond 58'	Stadium: Sixfields Stadium; Attendance: 4,858; Referee: S Tanner

=== League Cup ===
11 August 2009 First round	Southampton	2–0	Northampton Town	Southampton
19:45 BST	R.Lambert 29'; A.Lallana 68'	Report		Stadium: St Mary's Stadium; Attendance: 10,921; Referee: S Hooper

=== League Trophy ===
1 September 2009 First round (s)	Wycombe Wanderers	2–2 (0–3 p)	Northampton Town	High Wycombe
19:45 BST	JP.Pittman 62', 90'	Report	R.Gilligan 40'; S.Guinan 86'	Stadium: Adams Park; Attendance: 1,035; Referee: G Sutton
	Penalties
	I.Westlake (penalty missed); A.Chambers (penalty missed); L.Johnson (penalty missed)		R.Gilligan (penalty scored); S.Guinan (penalty scored); A.Osman (penalty scored)

6 October 2009 Second round (s)	Northampton Town	2–1	Bournemouth	Northampton
19:45 BST	S.Guinan 66'; R.Gilligan 90'	Report	D.Hollands 33'	Stadium: Sixfields Stadium; Attendance: 1,718; Referee: P Miller

10 November 2009 Quarter-final (s)	Milton Keynes Dons	3–1	Northampton Town	Bletchley
19:45 GMT	A.Wilbraham 6'; S.Baldock 16', 26'	Report	S.Guinan 51'	Stadium: Stadium:MK; Attendance: 8,886; Referee: K Wright

=== Appearances, goals and cards ===
No.	Pos	Player	League Two			FA Cup			League Cup			League Trophy			Total			Discipline	
No.	Pos	Player	Starts	Sub	Goals	Starts	Sub	Goals	Starts	Sub	Goals	Starts	Sub	Goals	Starts	Sub	Goals	Booked	Sent off (straight red)
1	GK	Chris Dunn	29	–	–	2	–	–	1	–	–	3	–	–	35	–	–	–	–
2	RB	Paul Rodgers	24	7	–	2	–	–	–	–	–	2	–	–	28	7	–	4	–
3	RB	John Johnson	36	–	5	1	–	–	–	–	–	1	–	–	38	–	5	4	–
4	CM	Luke Guttridge	24	7	4	2	–	2	–	–	–	1	–	–	27	7	6	4	–
5	CB	Craig Hinton	38	2	–	2	–	–	1	–	–	3	–	–	44	2	–	4	–
6	CB	Dean Beckwith	37	1	–	1	–	–	1	–	–	2	–	–	41	1	–	5	–
8	CM	Abdul Osman	26	4	2	–	–	–	1	–	–	1	1	–	28	5	2	5	–
9	ST	Steve Guinan	19	9	4	2	–	–	1	–	–	2	1	3	24	10	7	3	–
10	ST	Adebayo Akinfenwa	36	4	17	2	–	–	–	1	–	–	1	–	38	6	17	3	–
11	LM	Andy Holt	31	–	3	2	–	–	1	–	–	2	–	–	36	–	3	1	1
12	RM	Ryan Gilligan	41	1	8	2	–	1	1	–	–	3	–	2	47	1	11	11	–
13	GK	Paul Walker	–	–	–	–	–	–	–	–	–	–	–	–	–	–	–	–	–
14	LM	Liam Davis	13	4	2	–	1	–	–	–	–	1	–	–	14	5	2	–	–
15	CM	Alex Dyer	4	16	2	–	1	–	–	1	–	1	1	–	5	18	2	1	–
16	ST	Gary Mulligan	2	7	–	–	–	–	–	–	–	3	–	–	5	7	–	1	–
17	ST	Billy Mckay	29	11	8	–	1	–	1	–	–	–	1	–	30	13	8	–	–
18	ST	Joe Benjamin	2	1	–	–	–	–	–	–	–	–	1	–	2	2	–	1	–
19	U	John Curtis	18	1	–	1	–	–	–	1	–	–	–	–	19	2	–	5	–
21	LM	Michael Jacobs	–	–	–	–	–	–	–	–	–	1	1	–	1	1	–	–	–
22	ST	Courtney Herbert	8	14	2	–	–	–	–	–	–	–	1	–	8	15	2	1	–
23	LB	Peter Gilbert	30	–	–	1	–	–	–	–	–	–	–	–	31	–	–	4	1
24	ST	Seb Harris	–	9	1	–	1	–	–	–	–	–	–	–	–	10	1	–	–
26	GK	Jason Steele	13	–	–	–	–	–	–	–	–	–	–	–	13	–	–	–	–
28	ST	Stephen O'Flynn	–	5	–	–	–	–	–	–	–	–	–	–	–	5	–	–	–
30	RM	Kevin Thornton	4	7	1	–	–	–	–	–	–	–	–	–	4	7	1	2	1
Out on loan:
20	CB	Chris McCready	13	1	–	–	–	–	1	–	–	2	1	–	15	3	–	1	1
Players who left Northampton Town:
7	W	Ben Marshall	11	4	2	–	–	–	1	–	–	2	–	–	14	2	2	2	–
23	LB	Robbie Threlfall	1	3	–	–	–	–	–	–	–	1	–	–	2	3	–	–	–
25	ST	Luke Boden	4	–	–	–	–	–	–	–	–	1	–	–	5	–	–	–	–
25	CB	Danny Swailes	3	–	–	–	–	–	–	–	–	–	–	–	3	–	–	2	–
26	GK	Simon Brown	2	–	–	–	–	–	–	–	–	–	–	–	2	–	–	–	–
27	GK	Billy Lumley	2	–	–	–	–	–	–	–	–	–	–	–	2	–	–	–	–
40	CB	Pat Kanyuka	3	–	–	1	–	–	–	–	–	1	–	–	5	–	–	–	–
	W	Romone Rose	–	1	–	–	–	–	1	–	–	–	–	–	1	1	–	–	–
	CB	Luke Wilkinson	–	–	–	–	–	–	–	–	–	–	–	–	–	–	–	–	–

== Awards ==
2009–10 Awards	Pos.	Player
Player of the Year	ST	Adebayo Akinfenwa
Young Player of the Year	RB	John Johnson

== Transfers ==
=== Transfers in ===
Date from	Position	Nationality	Name	From	Fee	Ref.
1 July 2009	FW	(England)	Steve Guinan	Hereford United	Free	
1 July 2009	DF	(England)	Craig Hinton	Bristol Rovers	Free	
1 July 2009	DF	(England)	Dean Beckwith	Hereford United	Free	
8 July 2009	FW	(Republic of Ireland)	Gary Mulligan	Gillingham	Free	
21 July 2009	FW	(Northern Ireland)	Billy McKay	Leicester City	Free	
28 July 2009	MF	(England)	John Curtis	Wrexham	Free	
31 July 2009	DF	(England)	Paul Rodgers	Arsenal	Free	
3 August 2009	FW	(United States)	Sebastian Harris	Michigan Bucks	Free	
3 August 2009	DF	(England)	Chris McCready	Crewe Alexandra	Free	
11 September 2009	GK	(England)	Simon Brown	Unattached	Free	
23 September 2009	FW	(England)	Courtney Herbert	Long Buckby	Free	
23 October 2009	DF	(Democratic Republic of the Congo)	Pat Kanyuka	Unattached	Free	
13 November 2009	DF	(Wales)	Peter Gilbert	Unattached	Free	
23 December 2009	GK	(England)	Billy Lumley	Stafford Rangers	Free	
5 January 2010	FW	(Republic of Ireland)	Stephen O'Flynn	Limerick	Free	
8 January 2010	MF	(Republic of Ireland)	Kevin Thornton	Nuneaton Town	Free	

=== Transfers out ===
Date from	Position	Nationality	Name	To	Fee	Ref.
25 August 2009	DF	(England)	Danny Jackman	Gillingham	Undisclosed	

=== Loans in ===
Start date	Position	Nationality	Name	From	End date	Ref.
6 August 2009	MF	(England)	Romone Rose	Queens Park Rangers	6 September 2009	
7 August 2009	MF	(England)	Ben Marshall	Stoke City	4 November 2009	
21 August 2009	DF	(England)	Robbie Threlfall	Liverpool	21 September 2009	
27 August 2009	MF	(England)	Luke Boden	Sheffield Wednesday	27 September 2009	
24 September 2009	DF	(England)	John Johnson	Middlesbrough	30 June 2010	
19 November 2009	MF	(England)	Josh Walker	Middlesbrough	3 December 2009	
26 November 2009	DF	(England)	Danny Swailes	Middlesbrough	26 December 2009	
5 January 2009	DF	(England)	Luke Wilkinson	Portsmouth	5 February 2010	

=== Loans out ===
Start date	Position	Nationality	Name	To	End date	Ref.
9 November 2009	MF	(England)	Joe Benjamin	Eastbourne Borough	31 May 2010	
5 January 2010	GK	(Wales)	Paul Walker	Brackley Town	5 February 2010	
21 January 2010	DF	(England)	Chris McCready	Tranmere Rovers	31 May 2010	
