= 2010–11 Northampton Town F.C. season =

Northampton Town
2010–11 season
- Chairman: David Cardoza
- Manager: Ian Sampson (until 2 March); Gary Johnson
- League Two: 16th
- FA Cup: Second round
- League Cup: Fourth round
- League Trophy: First round
- Top goalscorer: League: Leon McKenzie (10); All: Leon McKenzie (10)
- Highest home attendance: 6,097 vs Oxford United
- Lowest home attendance: 2,431 vs Brighton & Hove Albion
- Average home league attendance: 4,604
Home colours	Away colours

The 2010–11 season was Northampton Town's 114th season in their history and the second successive season in League Two. Alongside competing in League Two, the club also participated in the FA Cup, League Cup and Football League Trophy. The team's shirt supplier was Erreà, and the shirt sponsor was Jackson Grundy.

== Players ==
As of match played 7 May 2011.

No.	Name	Position	Nat.	Place of Birth	Date of Birth (Age)	Apps	Goals	Previous club	Date signed	Fee
Goalkeepers
1	Chris Dunn	GK	(England)	Havering	23 October 1987 (aged 23)	110	0	Apprentice	22 April 2006	N/A
13	Paul Walker	GK	(Wales)	Cambridge (ENG)	18 April 1992 (aged 19)	1	0	Apprentice	30 August 2008	N/A
34	Steve Collis	GK	(England)	Harrow	18 March 1981 (aged 30)	3	0	Peterborough United	7 March 2011	Loan
Defenders
2	Paul Rodgers	RB	(England)	Edmonton	6 October 1989 (aged 21)	77	0	Arsenal	31 July 2009	Free
3	Marcus Hall	LB	(England)	Coventry	24 March 1976 (aged 35)	28	0	Coventry City	1 August 2010	Free
5	Byron Webster	CB	(England)	Leeds	31 March 1987 (aged 24)	8	0	Doncaster Rovers	17 March 2011	Loan
6	Dean Beckwith	CB	(England)	Southwark	18 September 1983 (aged 27)	84	3	Hereford United	29 June 2009	Free
14	John Johnson	RB	(England)	Middlesbrough	16 September 1988 (aged 22)	79	12	Middlesbrough	23 July 2010	Free
20	Seb Harris	CB	(United States)	Rochester, Michigan	5 August 1987 (aged 23)	15	1	Michigan Bucks	3 August 2009	Free
25	Ben Tozer	U	(England)	Plymouth	1 March 1990 (aged 21)	34	3	Newcastle United	21 September 2010	Loan
32	Jamie Reckord	LB	(England)	Wolverhampton	9 March 1992 (aged 19)	7	0	Wolverhampton Wanderers	7 March 2011	Loan
33	Seth Nana Twumasi	RB	(England)	Accra (GHA)	15 May 1992 (aged 18)	11	0	Peterborough United	7 March 2011	Loan
Midfielders
4	Kevin Thornton	RM	(Republic of Ireland)	Drogheda	9 July 1986 (aged 24)	43	9	Nuneaton Town	8 January 2010	Free
7	Ryan Gilligan	CM	(England)	Swindon	18 January 1987 (aged 24)	204	23	Watford	12 August 2005	Free
8	Abdul Osman	CM	(Ghana)	Accra	27 February 1987 (aged 24)	118	7	Gretna	12 June 2008	Free
11	Andy Holt	LB/LM	(England)	Stockport	21 April 1978 (aged 33)	210	17	Wrexham	27 June 2006	Free
12	Nat Wedderburn	CM	(England)	Wolverhampton	30 June 1991 (aged 19)	38	0	Stoke City	14 June 2010	Free
17	Michael Jacobs	W	(England)	Rothwell	4 November 1991 (aged 19)	50	8	Apprentice	1 July 2009	N/A
23	Liam Davis	LM	(England)	Wandsworth	23 November 1986 (aged 24)	91	9	Coventry City	6 June 2008	Free
27	Greg Kaziboni	W	(Zimbabwe)	Harare	10 February 1993 (aged 18)	2	0	Apprentice	14 January 2011	N/A
28	Francis Laurent	W	(France)	Paris	6 January 1986 (aged 25)	6	0	AFC Compiègne	14 January 2011	Free
30	Josh Walker	CM	(England)	Newcastle upon Tyne	21 February 1989 (aged 22)	19	0	Watford	28 January 2011	Loan
Forwards
9	Shaun Harrad	FW	(England)	Nottingham	11 December 1984 (aged 26)	18	6	Burton Albion	20 January 2011	£35,000
10	Tadhg Purcell	FW	(Republic of Ireland)	Sandyford	2 September 1985 (aged 25)	18	6	Darlington	30 June 2010	Free
16	Billy Mckay	FW	(Northern Ireland)	Corby (ENG)	22 October 1988 (aged 22)	84	16	Leicester City	21 July 2009	Free
18	Leon McKenzie	FW	(England)	Croydon	17 May 1978 (aged 32)	27	10	Charlton Athletic	8 September 2010	Free
19	Alex Konstantinou	FW	(Cyprus)	Nicosia	11 April 1992 (aged 19)	1	0	Apprentice	10 February 2010	N/A
21	Guillem Bauzà	FW	(Spain)	Palma	25 October 1984 (aged 26)	10	4	Hereford United	11 March 2011	Free
34	Michael Uwezu	FW	(Nigeria)	Irete	12 December 1990 (aged 20)	4	1	Dulwich Hamlet	24 March 2011	Free

== Competitions ==
=== Pre-season friendlies ===
13 July 2010	Kettering Town	0–1	Northampton Town	Kettering
19:45 BST				Stadium: Rockingham Road

21 July 2010	Northampton Town	0–1	Coventry City	Northampton
19:45 BST				Stadium: Sixfields Stadium

=== Football League Two ===
==== League table ====
Pos	Team	Pld	W	D	L	GF	GA	GD	Pts
14	Aldershot Town	46	14	19	13	54	54	0	61
15	Macclesfield Town	46	14	13	19	59	73	−14	55
16	Northampton Town	46	11	19	16	63	71	−8	52
17	Cheltenham Town	46	13	13	20	56	77	−21	52
18	Bradford City	46	15	7	24	43	68	−25	52

Updated to match(es) played on 28 May 2011. Source: The Football League
Rules for classification: 1) points; 2) goal difference; 3) number of goals scored.

==== Results summary ====
Overall								Home						Away					
Pld	W	D	L	GF	GA	GD	Pts	W	D	L	GF	GA	GD	W	D	L	GF	GA	GD
46	11	19	16	63	71	−8	52	8	9	6	40	33	+7	3	10	10	23	38	−15

Last updated: 7 May 2011.
Source: Northampton Town F.C.

==== League position by match ====
Round	1	2	3	4	5	6	7	8	9	10	11	12	13	14	15	16	17	18	19	20	21	22	23	24	25	26	27	28	29	30	31	32	33	34	35	36	37	38	39	40	41	42	43	44	45	46
Ground	A	H	A	H	A	H	A	H	H	A	A	H	A	H	A	H	A	A	H	A	A	H	H	A	H	H	H	A	H	H	A	H	H	A	H	H	A	H	A	A	H	A	H	A	H	A
Result	L	D	D	D	D	W	L	W	L	L	L	L	L	W	W	D	L	D	W	W	L	W	D	L	W	W	D	D	D	D	D	D	L	L	L	L	D	D	L	D	L	D	D	D	W	W
Position	24	22	20	19	19	16	17	13	18	19	22	22	23	21	19	20	22	22	18	15	19	14	14	17	14	13	14	14	14	14	15	15	16	16	17	19	20	20	21	21	21	21	21	22	20	16

Updated to match(es) played on 7 May 2011. Source: BBC Sport
A = Away; H = Home; W = Win; D = Draw; L = Loss

==== Matches ====
Win Draw Loss

7 August 2010 1	Torquay United	3–0	Northampton Town	Torquay
15:00 BST	K.Nicholson 44'; C.Zebroski 47'; E.Benyon 50'	Report		Stadium: Plainmoor; Attendance: 3,567; Referee: O Langford

14 August 2010 2	Northampton Town	0–0	Accrington Stanley	Northampton
15:00 BST		Report		Stadium: Sixfields Stadium; Attendance: 4,042; Referee: Phil Crossley

21 August 2010 3	Bury	1–1	Northampton Town	Bury
15:00 BST	D.Worrall 69'	Report	S.Guinan 32' (pen.)	Stadium: Gigg Lane; Attendance: 2,845; Referee: A Bates

28 August 2010 4	Northampton Town	1–1	Wycombe Wanderers	Northampton
15:00 BST	K.Thornton 87' (pen.)	Report	A.Sandell 39'	Stadium: Sixfields Stadium; Attendance: 4,202; Referee: Carl Boyeson

4 September 2010 5	Aldershot Town	1–1	Northampton Town	Aldershot
15:00 BST	B.Harding 90'	Report	B.McKay 35'	Stadium: Recreation Ground; Attendance: 3,321; Referee: G Scott

11 September 2010 6	Northampton Town	2–1	Southend United	Northampton
15:00 BST	A.Osman 63'; A.Holt 75'	Report	A.Grant 56'	Stadium: Sixfields Stadium; Attendance: 5,720; Referee: Mark Haywood

18 September 2010 7	Shrewsbury Town	3–1	Northampton Town	Shrewsbury
15:00 BST	M.Harrold 12'; J.Robinson 49', 53'	Report	K.Thornton 44'	Stadium: Prostar Stadium; Attendance: 5,527; Referee: M Naylor

25 September 2010 8	Northampton Town	2–0	Bradford City	Northampton
15:00 BST	B.McKay 61'; B.Tozer 81'	Report		Stadium: Sixfields Stadium; Attendance: 4,646; Referee: P Gibbs

28 September 2010 9	Northampton Town	1–2	Chesterfield	Northampton
19:45 BST	K.Thornton 45'	Report	D.Morgan 71'; C.Davies 75'	Stadium: Sixfields Stadium; Attendance: 4,025; Referee: Andy D'Urso

2 October 2010 10	Macclesfield Town	2–0	Northampton Town	Macclesfield
15:00 BST	H.Bencherif 25'; N.Brown 71'	Report		Stadium: Moss Rose; Attendance: 1,699; Referee: R Booth

9 October 2010 11	Cheltenham Town	1–0	Northampton Town	Cheltenham
15:00 BST	B.Smikle 60'	Report		Stadium: Whaddon Road; Attendance: 3,016; Referee: D Phillips

16 October 2010 12	Northampton Town	3–4	Hereford United	Northampton
15:00 BST	L.McKenzie 24', 41', 45'	Report	S.Fleetwood 59', 70'; J.McQuilkin 72'; M.Manset 78'	Stadium: Sixfields Stadium; Attendance: 4,333; Referee: Darren Deadman

23 October 2010 13	Oxford United	3–1	Northampton Town	Oxford
15:00 BST	A.Potter 4'; J.Payne 45'; T.Craddock 90' (pen.)	Report	L.McKenzie 16'	Stadium: Kassam Stadium; Attendance: 7,647; Referee: Paul Tierney

30 October 2010 14	Northampton Town	2–1	Gillingham	Northampton
15:00 BST	D.Beckwith 21'; L.McKenzie 40' (pen.)	Report	C.Palmer 7'	Stadium: Sixfields Stadium; Attendance: 4,573; Referee: R Shoebridge

2 November 2010 15	Lincoln City	0–2	Northampton Town	Lincoln
19:45 GMT		Report	D.Beckwith 37'; J.Johnson 74'	Stadium: Sincil Bank; Attendance: 4,459; Referee: M Brown

13 November 2010 16	Northampton Town	0–0	Port Vale	Northampton
15:00 GMT		Report		Stadium: Sixfields Stadium; Attendance: 4,612; Referee: I Williamson

20 November 2010 17	Barnet	4–1	Northampton Town	Barnet
15:00 GMT	S.Kabba 11' (pen.), 45'; G.Basey 47'; R.Holmes 90'	Report	L.McKenzie 7'	Stadium: Underhill Stadium; Attendance: 1,918; Referee: Steve Tanner

23 November 2010 18	Rotherham United	2–2	Northampton Town	Sheffield
19:45 GMT	R.Taylor 4'; M.Marshall 19'	Report	A.Osman 23'; A.Holt 24'	Stadium: Don Valley Stadium; Attendance: 2,490; Referee: R Lewis

4 December 2010 19	Northampton Town	2–0	Stockport County	Northampton
15:00 GMT	K.Thornton 4'; M.Jacobs 75'	Report		Stadium: Sixfields Stadium; Attendance: 4,088; Referee: Jon Moss

11 December 2010 20	Stevenage	0–1	Northampton Town	Stevenage
15:00 GMT		Report	R.Gilligan 14'	Stadium: Broadhall Way; Attendance: 3,128; Referee: G Horwood

1 January 2011 21	Crewe Alexandra	2–0	Northampton Town	Crewe
15:00 GMT	C.Donaldson 43'; S.Miller 59'	Report		Stadium: Gresty Road; Attendance: 3,835; Referee: Craig Pawson

3 January 2011 22	Northampton Town	2–1	Lincoln City	Northampton
15:00 GMT	B.McKay 64'; J.Johnson 88'	Report	J.O'Keefe 75'	Stadium: Sixfields Stadium; Attendance: 4,112; Referee: G Hegley

8 January 2011 23	Northampton Town	1–1	Cheltenham Town	Northampton
15:00 GMT	B.McKay 16'	Report	W.Thomas 48'	Stadium: Sixfields Stadium; Attendance: 4,031; Referee: S Rushton

15 January 2011 24	Gillingham	1–0	Northampton Town	Gillingham
15:00 GMT	C.McDonald 32'	Report		Stadium: Priestfield Stadium; Attendance: 5,613; Referee: Trevor Kettle

22 January 2011 25	Northampton Town	2–1	Oxford United	Northampton
15:00 GMT	A.Holt 42'; L.McKenzie 67'	Report	T.Craddock 47'	Stadium: Sixfields Stadium; Attendance: 6,097; Referee: Andre Marriner

1 February 2011 26	Northampton Town	6–2	Crewe Alexandra	Northampton
19:45 GMT	S.Harrad 11'; M.Jacobs 14'; D.Beckwith 44'; A.Holt 46'; A.Osman 48'; B.McKay 80'	Report	A.Leitch-Smith 5'; A.Sarcevic 88'	Stadium: Sixfields Stadium; Attendance: 4,021; Referee: Andy Madley

5 February 2011 27	Northampton Town	0–0	Barnet	Northampton
15:00 GMT		Report		Stadium: Sixfields Stadium; Attendance: 4,573; Referee: D Coote

12 February 2011 28	Port Vale	1–1	Northampton Town	Burslem
15:00 GMT	J.Richards 55' (pen.)	Report	L.McKenzie 58'; A.Osman (red card) 68'	Stadium: Vale Park; Attendance: 5,321; Referee: Malone

15 February 2011 29	Northampton Town	3–3	Morecambe	Northampton
19:45 GMT	J.Johnson 12'; K.Thornton 50'; L.McKenzie 71' (pen.)	Report	K.Hurst 22'; J.Spencer 67'; P.Mullin 87'	Stadium: Sixfields Stadium; Attendance: 3,522; Referee: R Madley

19 February 2011 30	Northampton Town	1–1	Aldershot Town	Northampton
15:00 GMT	B.Tozer 18'	Report	P.Vincenti 78'	Stadium: Sixfields Stadium; Attendance: 5,011; Referee: K Evans

22 February 2011 31	Hereford United	1–1	Northampton Town	Hereford
19:45 GMT	W.Fairhurst 67'	Report	A.Holt 47'	Stadium: Edgar Street; Attendance: 2,125; Referee: K Hill

26 February 2011 32	Southend United	1–1	Northampton Town	Southend
15:00 GMT	B.Corr 34'	Report	J.Johnson 27'	Stadium: Roots Hall; Attendance: 6,384; Referee: R Booth

1 March 2011 33	Northampton Town	2–3	Burton Albion	Northampton
19:45 GMT	J.Johnson 45'; A.Holt 61'	Report	A.Corbett 22'; J.McGrath 37'; C.Dunn 39' (o.g.)	Stadium: Sixfields Stadium; Attendance: 3,423; Referee: P Miller

5 March 2011 34	Northampton Town	2–3	Shrewsbury Town	Northampton
15:00 GMT	M.Jacobs 6', 47'	Report	D.Davis 8'; J.Collins 51'; J.Taylor 87'	Stadium: Sixfields Stadium; Attendance: 5,113; Referee: Trevor Kettle

8 March 2011 35	Chesterfield	2–1	Northampton Town	Chesterfield
19:45 GMT	C.Davies 64'; J.Lester 69'	Report	A.Holt 82'	Stadium: B2net Stadium; Attendance: 5,661; Referee: P Quinn

12 March 2011 36	Northampton Town	0–1	Macclesfield Town	Northampton
15:00 GMT		Report	T.Barnett 57'	Stadium: Sixfields Stadium; Attendance: 4,707; Referee: Trevor Kettle

19 March 2011 37	Bradford City	1–1	Northampton Town	Bradford
15:00 GMT	J.Speight 8' (pen.)	Report	S.Harrad 60' (pen.)	Stadium: Valley Parade; Attendance: 10,684; Referee: R Lewis

25 March 2011 38	Northampton Town	2–2	Torquay United	Northampton
19:45 GMT	J.Johnson 30'; G.Bauzà 90'	Report	E.O'Kane 14'; B.Kee 90'	Stadium: Sixfields Stadium; Attendance: 4,553; Referee: Carl Sarginson

2 April 2011 39	Accrington Stanley	3–1	Northampton Town	Accrington
15:00 BST	I.Craney 16', 27'; S.McConville 36'	Report	M.Jacobs 67'	Stadium: Crown Ground; Attendance: 1,876; Referee: P Gibbs

5 April 2011 40	Burton Albion	1–1	Northampton Town	Burton Upon Trent
19:45 BST	A.Webster 43'	Report	G.Bauzà 39'	Stadium: Pirelli Stadium; Attendance: 2,536; Referee: Darren Drysdale

9 April 2011 41	Northampton Town	2–4	Bury	Northampton
15:00 BST	S.Harrad 59', 90'	Report	R.Lowe 24'; N.Ajose 28', 57'; D.Mozika 42'	Stadium: Sixfields Stadium; Attendance: 5,077; Referee: J Linnington

16 April 2011 42	Wycombe Wanderers	2–2	Northampton Town	High Wycombe
15:00 BST	S.Donnelly 51'; L.Johnson 82'	Report	S.Harrad 20' (pen.); G.Bauzà 37'	Stadium: Adams Park; Attendance: 5,161; Referee: Phil Crossley

22 April 2011 43	Northampton Town	2–2	Rotherham United	Northampton
19:45 BST	L.McKenzie 68'; L.Davis 90'	Report	N.Law 5'; R.Taylor 45'	Stadium: Sixfields Stadium; Attendance: 5,167; Referee: Keith Stroud

25 April 2011 44	Stockport County	2–2	Northampton Town	Stockport
15:00 BST	A.Griffin 23'; G.Tansey 88'	Report	G.Bauzà 2'; S.Harrad 78' (pen.)	Stadium: Edgeley Park; Attendance: 4,807; Referee: N Miller

30 April 2011 45	Northampton Town	2–0	Stevenage	Northampton
15:00 BST	L.Davis 4'; M.Uwezu 59'	Report		Stadium: Sixfields Stadium; Attendance: 6,257; Referee: Paul Tierney

7 May 2011 46	Morecambe	1–2	Northampton Town	Morecambe
15:00 BST	N.Cowperthwaite 90'	Report	K.Thornton 24'; B.Tozer 84'	Stadium: Globe Arena; Attendance: 2,674; Referee: A Haines

=== FA Cup ===
6 November 2010 First round	Forest Green Rovers	0–3	Northampton Town	Nailsworth
15:00 GMT		Report	J.Johnson 30'; S.Guinan 40'; M.Jacobs 76'	Stadium: The New Lawn; Attendance: 1,479; Referee: James Linington

27 November 2010 Second round	Sheffield Wednesday	3–2	Northampton Town	Sheffield
15:00 GMT	M.Beevers 6'; T.Miller 37' (pen.), 90+2' (pen.)	Report	B.McKay 56'; K.Thornton 90+4'	Stadium: Hillsborough Stadium; Attendance: 8,932; Referee: Dave Foster

=== League Cup ===
12 August 2010 First round	Northampton Town	2–0	Brighton & Hove Albion	Northampton
19:45 BST	M.Jacobs 13'; B.McKay 18'	Report		Stadium: Sixfields Stadium; Attendance: 2,431; Referee: Craig Pawson

24 August 2010 Second round	Reading	3–3 (a.e.t.) (2–4 p)	Northampton Town	Reading
20:00 BST	M.Mills 16', 113'; H.Robson-Kanu 62'	Report	A.Holt 20'; K.Thornton 64'; M.Mills 120' (o.g.)	Stadium: Madejski Stadium; Attendance: 6,986; Referee: Roger East
	Penalties
	S.Church (penalty missed); S.Long (penalty scored); H.Robson-Kanu (penalty scored); J.Taylor (penalty missed)		S.Guinan (penalty scored); K.Thornton (penalty scored); M.Jacobs (penalty scored); A.Osman (penalty scored)

22 September 2010 Third round	Liverpool	2–2 (a.e.t.) (2–4 p)	Northampton Town	Liverpool
20:00 BST	M.Jovanovic 9'; D.Ngog 116'	Report	B.McKay 56'; M.Jacobs 99'	Stadium: Anfield; Attendance: 22,577; Referee: Anthony Taylor
	Penalties
	D.Ngog (penalty missed); J.Shelvey (penalty scored); D.Agger (penalty scored); N.Eccleston (penalty missed)		S.Guinan (penalty missed); K.Thornton (penalty scored); L.Davis (penalty scored); M.Jacobs (penalty scored); A.Osman (penalty scored)

26 October 2010 Fourth round	Ipswich Town	3–1	Northampton Town	Ipswich
19:45 BST	C.Edwards 26'; D.Delaney 44'; T.Priskin 88'	Report	L.Davis 16'	Stadium: Portman Road; Attendance: 12,929; Referee: Eddie Ilderton

=== League Trophy ===
31 August 2010 First round	Hartlepool United	4–0	Northampton Town	Hartlepool
19:00 BST	E.Horwood 66'; A.Sweeney 68'; A.Monkhouse 71'; Behan 75'			Stadium: Victoria Park; Attendance: 1,359; Referee: Bobby Madley

=== Appearances, goals and cards ===
No.	Pos	Player	League Two			FA Cup			League Cup			League Trophy			Total			Discipline	
No.	Pos	Player	Starts	Sub	Goals	Starts	Sub	Goals	Starts	Sub	Goals	Starts	Sub	Goals	Starts	Sub	Goals	Booked	Sent off (straight red)
1	GK	Chris Dunn	39	–	–	2	–	–	2	–	–	1	–	–	44	–	–	–	–
2	RB	Paul Rodgers	15	10	–	2	–	–	3	–	–	1	–	–	21	10	–	6	–
3	LB	Marcus Hall	21	3	–	–	–	–	3	–	–	1	–	–	25	3	–	5	–
4	CM	Kevin Thornton	16	9	6	–	2	1	3	1	1	1	–	–	20	12	8	2	–
5	CB	Byron Webster	8	–	–	–	–	–	–	–	–	–	–	–	8	–	–	–	–
6	CB	Dean Beckwith	35	2	3	2	–	–	2	–	–	–	1	–	39	3	3	7	1
7	RM	Ryan Gilligan	20	2	1	1	–	–	3	–	–	–	–	–	24	2	1	4	–
8	CM	Abdul Osman	37	1	3	2	–	–	4	–	–	1	–	–	44	1	3	10	2
9	ST	Shaun Harrad	18	–	6	–	–	–	–	–	–	–	–	–	18	–	6	1	1
10	ST	Tadhg Purcell	1	3	–	–	–	–	1	1	–	–	–	–	2	4	–	1	–
11	U	Andy Holt	32	7	7	2	–	–	3	1	1	1	–	–	38	8	8	3	–
12	CM	Nathaniel Wedderburn	21	10	–	2	–	–	3	1	–	1	–	–	27	11	–	3	–
13	GK	Paul Walker	–	1	–	–	–	–	–	–	–	–	–	–	–	1	–	–	–
14	RB	John Johnson	38	–	6	1	–	1	2	–	–	–	–	–	41	–	7	10	1
16	ST	Billy Mckay	24	10	5	2	–	1	4	–	2	–	1	–	30	11	8	2	–
17	W	Michael Jacobs	33	8	5	–	2	1	3	1	2	1	–	–	37	11	8	2	–
18	ST	Leon McKenzie	17	10	10	–	–	–	–	–	–	–	–	–	17	10	10	3	–
19	ST	Alex Konstantinou	–	–	–	–	–	–	–	1	–	–	–	–	–	1	–	–	–
20	CB	Seb Harris	1	3	–	–	–	–	–	–	–	1	–	–	2	3	–	–	–
21	ST	Guillem Bauzà	9	1	4	–	–	–	–	–	–	–	–	–	9	1	4	2	–
23	LB	Liam Davis	32	1	2	2	–	–	2	–	1	–	1	–	36	2	3	3	1
25	CB	Ben Tozer	28	3	3	2	–	–	1	–	–	–	–	–	31	3	3	3	1
27	RM	Greg Kaziboni	–	2	–	–	–	–	–	–	–	–	–	–	–	2	–	–	–
28	W	Francis Laurent	3	3	–	–	–	–	–	–	–	–	–	–	3	3	–	2	–
29	RM	Michael Built	–	–	–	–	–	–	–	–	–	–	–	–	–	–	–	–	–
30	CM	Josh Walker	19	–	–	–	–	–	–	–	–	–	–	–	19	–	–	4	–
32	LB	Jamie Reckord	4	3	–	–	–	–	–	–	–	–	–	–	4	3	–	3	–
33	RB	Seth Nana Twumasi	11	–	–	–	–	–	–	–	–	–	–	–	11	–	–	4	–
34	GK	Steve Collis	3	1	–	–	–	–	2	–	–	–	–	–	3	1	–	1	–
34	ST	Michael Uwezu	2	2	1	–	–	–	2	–	–	–	–	–	2	2	1	–	–
Youth players:
22	LB	Charlie Death	–	–	–	–	–	–	–	–	–	–	–	–	–	–	–	–	–
24	RB	Ben Islam	–	–	–	–	–	–	–	–	–	–	–	–	–	–	–	–	–
26	GK	Mihai Gherasim	–	–	–	–	–	–	–	–	–	–	–	–	–	–	–	–	–
31	MF	Malachi Farquharson	–	–	–	–	–	–	–	–	–	–	–	–	–	–	–	–	–
Out on loan:
15	W	Courtney Herbert	1	14	–	–	–	–	1	2	–	1	–	–	3	16	–	–	–
Players who left Northampton Town:
5	CB	Craig Hinton	–	–	–	–	–	–	1	–	–	–	–	–	1	–	–	–	–
9	ST	Steve Guinan	5	6	1	1	–	1	1	2	–	1	–	–	8	8	2	1	–
26	GK	Oscar Jansson	4	–	–	–	–	–	2	–	–	–	–	–	6	–	–	–	–
28	ST	Craig King	3	4	–	1	–	–	–	–	–	–	–	–	4	4	–	–	–
28	W	Josh Parker	3	–	–	–	–	–	–	–	–	–	–	–	3	–	–	–	–
30	ST	Ryan Jarvis	3	–	–	–	1	–	–	–	–	–	–	–	3	1	–	–	–

== Awards ==
=== Club awards ===
At the end of the season, Northampton's annual award ceremony, including categories voted for by the players and backroom staff, the supporters, will see the players recognised for their achievements for the club throughout the 2010–11 season.

Player of the Year Award	Michael Jacobs
Chronicle & Echo Northampton Town Player of the Year Award	Michael Jacobs

== Transfers ==
=== Transfers in ===
Date	Pos.	Name	From	Fee	Ref.
14 June 2010	MF	(England) Nathaniel Wedderburn	(England) Stoke City	Free	
30 June 2010	FW	(Republic of Ireland) Tadhg Purcell	(England) Darlington	Free (Bosman)	
1 July 2010	MF	(England) Alistair Slowe	(Cyprus) Onisilos Sotira	Free	
23 July 2010	MF	(England) John Johnson	(England) Middlesbrough	Free	
1 August 2010	DF	(England) Marcus Hall	(England) Coventry City	Free	
8 September 2010	FW	(England) Leon McKenzie	(England) Charlton Athletic	Free	
14 January 2011	FW	(France) Francis Laurent	(France) AFC Compiègne	Free	
20 January 2011	FW	(England) Shaun Harrad	(England) Burton Albion	£35,000	
11 March 2011	FW	(Spain) Guillem Bauzà	(England) Hereford United	Free (Bosman)	
24 March 2011	FW	(Nigeria) Michael Uwezu	(England) Dulwich Hamlet	Free	

=== Loans in ===
Date from	Pos.	Name	From	Date to	Ref.
5 August 2010	GK	(Sweden) Oscar Jansson	(England) Tottenham Hotspur	7 September 2010	
21 September 2010	DF	(England) Ben Tozer	(England) Newcastle United	16 October 2010	
1 October 2010	MF	(England) Josh Parker	(England) Queens Park Rangers	25 October 2010	
2 November 2010	DF	(England) Ben Tozer	(England) Newcastle United	End of season	
11 November 2010	FW	(Scotland) Craig King	(England) Leicester City	14 January 2011	
26 November 2010	FW	(England) Ryan Jarvis	(England) Leyton Orient	5 January 2011	
28 January 2011	MF	(England) Josh Walker	(England) Watford	End of season	
7 March 2011	DF	(England) Seth Nana Twumasi	(England) Peterborough United	End of season	
7 March 2011	GK	(England) Steve Collis	(England) Peterborough United	End of season	
7 March 2011	DF	(England) Jamie Reckord	(England) Wolverhampton Wanderers	End of season	
17 March 2011	DF	(England) Byron Webster	(England) Doncaster Rovers	End of season	

=== Loans out ===
Date from	Pos.	Name	To	Date to	Ref.
29 October 2010	DF	(United States) Seb Harris	(England) Stafford Rangers	3 January 2011	
26 November 2010	DF	(England) Craig Hinton	(England) Luton Town	6 January 2011	
26 November 2010	FW	(England) Steve Guinan	(England) Forest Green Rovers	10 January 2011	
10 February 2011	MF	(England) Ryan Gilligan	(England) Torquay United	10 March 2011	
11 February 2011	DF	(United States) Seb Harris	(England) Nuneaton Town	11 March 2011	
24 March 2011	FW	(England) Courtney Herbert	(England) Cambridge United	End of season	

=== Released ===
Date	Pos.	Name	Subsequent club	Join date	Ref.
16 June 2010	DF	(England) John Curtis	(Australia) Gold Coast United	16 June 2010	
22 June 2010	FW	(Republic of Ireland) Stephen O'Flynn	(Republic of Ireland) Limerick	22 June 2010	
1 July 2010	MF	(England) Luke Guttridge	(England) Aldershot Town	2 July 2010	
1 July 2010	FW	(England) Adebayo Akinfenwa	(England) Gillingham	27 July 2010 (Bosman)	
1 July 2010	FW	(Republic of Ireland) Gary Mulligan	(England) Gateshead	6 August 2010	
1 July 2010	FW	(England) Joe Benjamin	(England) Ebbsfleet United	13 August 2010	
1 July 2010	FW	(England) Alex Dyer	(England) Wealdstone	??	
5 July 2010	DF	(Wales) Peter Gilbert	(England) Southend United	8 July 2010	
27 July 2010	DF	(England) Chris McCready	(England) Morecambe	27 July 2010	
10 January 2011	FW	(England) Steve Guinan	(England) Forest Green Rovers	10 January 2011	
10 March 2011	MF	(England) Alistair Slowe	Unattached		
18 March 2011	DF	(England) Craig Hinton	(England) Bristol Rovers	18 March 2011 (Assistant manager)	
