= 2008–09 Northampton Town F.C. season =

Northampton Town
2008–09 season
- Chairman: David Cardoza
- Manager: Stuart Gray
- Stadium: Sixfields Stadium
- League One: 21st (Relegated)
- FA Cup: First round
- League Cup: Second round
- League Trophy: First round
- Top goalscorer: League: Adebayo Akinfenwa (13); All: Adebayo Akinfenwa (15)
- Highest home attendance: 7,028 vs Leicester City
- Lowest home attendance: 2,047 vs Brighton & Hove Albion

The 2008–09 season was Northampton Town's 112th season in their history and the third successive season in League One. Alongside competing in League One, the club also participated in the FA Cup, League Cup and Football League Trophy.

== Players ==
As of match played 2 May 2009.

No.	Name	Position	Nat.	Place of Birth	Date of Birth (Age)	Apps	Goals	Previous club	Date signed	Fee
Goalkeepers
13	Chris Dunn	GK	(England)	Havering	23 October 1987 (aged 21)	31	0	Apprentice	22 April 2006	N/A
25	Paul Walker	GK	(Wales)	Cambridge (ENG)	18 April 1992 (aged 17)	0	0	Apprentice	30 August 2008	N/A
Defenders
2	Jason Crowe	RB	(England)	Sidcup	30 September 1978 (aged 30)	193	17	Grimsby Town	29 May 2005	Free
3	Danny Jackman	LB/LM	(England)	Worcester	3 January 1983 (aged 26)	93	9	Gillingham	24 May 2007	Free
4	Mark Hughes	CB	(England)	Kirkby	9 December 1986 (aged 22)	106	4	Everton	31 January 2007	Undisclosed
5	Adam Watts	CB	(England)	Hackney	4 March 1988 (aged 21)	5	0	Fulham	26 March 2009	Loan
6	Chris Doig	CB	(Scotland)	Dumfries	13 February 1981 (aged 28)	147	5	Nottingham Forest	30 June 2005	Free
19	Liam Dolman	CB	(England)	Northampton	26 September 1987 (aged 21)	54	1	Apprentice	1 July 2005	N/A
23	Paul Rodgers	RB	(England)	Edmonton	6 October 1989 (aged 19)	11	0	Arsenal	22 January 2009	Loan
24	Greg Taylor	RB	(England)	Bedford	15 January 1990 (aged 19)	1	0	Apprentice	1 July 2007	N/A
27	Jared Hodgkiss	RB	(England)	Stafford	15 November 1986 (aged 22)	5	0	West Bromwich Albion	26 March 2009	Loan
Midfielders
7	Giles Coke	CM	(England)	Westminster	3 June 1986 (aged 22)	58	7	Mansfield Town	2 July 2007	Tribunal
11	Andy Holt	LB/LM	(England)	Stockport	21 April 1978 (aged 31)	128	6	Wrexham	27 June 2006	Free
12	Ikechi Anya	W	(Scotland)	Glasgow	3 January 1988 (aged 21)	14	3	Glenn Hoddle Academy	28 February 2009	Free
14	Liam Davis	LM	(England)	Wandsworth	23 November 1986 (aged 22)	34	4	Coventry City	6 June 2008	Free
15	Abdul Osman	CM	(Ghana)	Accra	27 February 1987 (aged 22)	40	2	Gretna	12 June 2008	Free
18	Ryan Gilligan	CM	(England)	Swindon	18 January 1987 (aged 22)	130	11	Watford	12 August 2005	Free
20	Alex Dyer	CM	(England)	Täby (SWE)	11 June 1990 (aged 18)	19	1	Apprentice	1 July 2007	N/A
21	Luke Guttridge	CM	(England)	Barnstaple	27 March 1982 (aged 27)	29	3	Colchester United	4 August 2008	Free
Forwards
8	Leon Constantine	FW	(England)	Hackney	24 February 1978 (aged 31)	37	3	Leeds United	2 July 2008	Free
9	Colin Larkin	FW	(Republic of Ireland)	Dundalk	27 April 1982 (aged 27)	63	5	Chesterfield	28 June 2007	Free
10	Adebayo Akinfenwa	FW	(England)	Islington	10 May 1982 (aged 26)	51	22	Millwall	18 January 2008	Free
17	Aleksandar Prijović	FW	(Serbia)	St. Gallen (SWI)	21 April 1990 (aged 19)	10	2	Derby County	17 March 2009	Loan
22	Joey Benjamin	FW	(England)	Woodford	8 October 1990 (aged 18)	4	0	Apprentice	1 August 2008	N/A

== Competitions ==
=== Football League One ===
==== League table ====
Pos	Team	Pld	W	D	L	GF	GA	GD	Pts	Promotion or relegation
19	Hartlepool United	46	13	11	22	66	79	−13	50	
20	Carlisle United	46	12	14	20	56	69	−13	50	
21	Northampton Town (R)	46	12	13	21	61	65	−4	49	Relegation to Football League Two
22	Crewe Alexandra (R)	46	12	10	24	59	82	−23	46	Relegation to Football League Two
23	Cheltenham Town (R)	46	9	12	25	51	91	−40	39	Relegation to Football League Two

Updated to match(es) played on 2 May 2009. Source: The Football League
Rules for classification: 1) points; 2) goal difference; 3) number of goals scored.
(R) Relegated

==== Results summary ====
Overall								Home						Away					
Pld	W	D	L	GF	GA	GD	Pts	W	D	L	GF	GA	GD	W	D	L	GF	GA	GD
46	12	13	21	61	65	−4	49	8	8	7	38	29	+9	4	5	14	23	36	−13

Last updated: May 2009.

==== League position by match ====
Round	1	2	3	4	5	6	7	8	9	10	11	12	13	14	15	16	17	18	19	20	21	22	23	24	25	26	27	28	29	30	31	32	33	34	35	36	37	38	39	40	41	42	43	44	45	46
Ground	H	A	H	A	H	A	A	H	A	H	H	A	A	A	H	A	H	H	H	A	H	A	H	H	A	H	A	H	A	H	A	A	H	A	A	H	H	A	A	A	H	A	H	H	H	A
Result	W	L	D	L	D	D	L	D	W	W	W	L	D	L	L	W	W	L	D	D	W	L	D	D	L	W	L	L	L	L	D	W	D	L	L	W	L	D	L	L	L	W	D	W	L	L
Position	2	10	9	18	21	17	20	20	16	13	10	14	14	15	16	15	13	13	14	15	15	14	14	13	14	12	13	15	18	18	18	16	17	18	19	19	20	20	21	21	21	21	20	19	19	21

Source: Northampton Town F.C.
A = Away; H = Home; W = Win; D = Draw; L = Loss

==== Matches ====
Win Draw Loss

9 August 2008 1	Northampton Town	4–2	Cheltenham Town	Northampton
15:00 BST	C.Doig 42'; A.Akinfenwa 64' (pen.), 68' (pen.); L.Constantine 77'	Report	G.Gyepes 35' (o.g.); M.Townsend 74' (pen.)	Stadium: Sixfields Stadium; Attendance: 4,716; Referee: Graham Horwood

16 August 2008 2	Milton Keynes Dons	1–0	Northampton Town	Bletchley
15:00 BST	A.Wilbraham 66'	Report		Stadium: Stadium:MK; Attendance: 12,078; Referee: Gavin Ward

23 August 2008 3	Northampton Town	0–0	Millwall	Northampton
15:00 BST		Report		Stadium: Sixfields Stadium; Attendance: 4,402; Referee: Darren Deadman

30 August 2008 4	Tranmere Rovers	4–1	Northampton Town	Birkenhead
15:00 BST	B.Savage 35'; A.Kay 38'; C.Curran 45'; I.Thomas-Moore 90'	Report	R.Gilligan 10'	Stadium: Prenton Park; Attendance: 5,034; Referee: Mark Heywood

13 September 2008 5	Northampton Town	1–1	Peterborough United	Northampton
15:00 BST	C.Larkin 43'; J.Crowe (red card) 90'	Report	G.Boyd 15'	Stadium: Sixfields Stadium; Attendance: 6,520; Referee: Keith Stroud

16 September 2008 6	Stockport County	1–1	Northampton Town	Stockport
19:45 BST	L.McSweeney 76'	Report	K.Hawley 5'	Stadium: Edgeley Park; Attendance: 4,974; Referee: Neil Swarbrick

20 September 2008 7	Huddersfield Town	3–2	Northampton Town	Huddersfield
15:00 BST	A.Booth 34'; M.Flynn 64', 78'	Report	J.Goodwin 25' (o.g.); L.Davis 90'	Stadium: Galpharm Stadium; Attendance: 12,414; Referee: Colin Webster

27 September 2008 8	Northampton Town	2–2	Brighton & Hove Albion	Northampton
15:00 BST	A.Akinfenwa 77', 90+6'	Report	G.Murray 43', 90+1'	Stadium: Sixfields Stadium; Attendance: 5,389; Referee: Andy Hall

4 October 2008 9	Crewe Alexandra	1–3	Northampton Town	Crewe
15:00 BST	T.Pope 55'	Report	D.Jackman 45'; A.Akinfenwa 64' (pen.); A.Osman 70'	Stadium: Gresty Road; Attendance: 3,977; Referee: Andy Haines

10 October 2008 10	Northampton Town	1–0	Hartlepool United	Northampton
19:45 BST	K.Hawley 17'	Report		Stadium: Sixfields Stadium; Attendance: 5,277; Referee: Graham Horwood

18 October 2008 11	Northampton Town	3–0	Yeovil Town	Northampton
15:00 BST	D.Jackman 17'; A.Akinfenwa 20'; J.Crowe 81'	Report		Stadium: Sixfields Stadium; Attendance: 5,217; Referee: Kevin Wright

21 October 2008 12	Swindon Town	2–1	Northampton Town	Swindon
19:45 BST	B.Paynter 48'; S.Cox 61'	Report	G.Coke 90'	Stadium: County Ground; Attendance: 6,653; Referee: Andy D' Urso

25 October 2008 13	Leicester City	0–0	Northampton Town	Leicester
15:00 BST		Report		Stadium: Walkers Stadium; Attendance: 22,795; Referee: Scott Mathieson

1 November 2008 14	Walsall	3–1	Northampton Town	Walsall
15:00 GMT	C.Palmer 17'; A.Gerrard 22'; T.Deeney 63'	Report	L.Constantine 80'	Stadium: Bescot Stadium; Attendance: 4,377; Referee: Graham Scott

15 November 2008 15	Northampton Town	0–1	Oldham Athletic	Northampton
15:00 GMT		Report	A.Liddell 76' (pen.); L.Hughes (red card) 90'	Stadium: Sixfields Stadium; Attendance: 5,067; Referee: Paul Taylor

22 November 2008 16	Hereford United	0–2	Northampton Town	Hereford
15:00 GMT		Report	D.Jackman 49'; R.Gilligan 61'	Stadium: Edgar Street; Attendance: 3,061; Referee: Oliver Langford

25 November 2008 17	Northampton Town	2–1	Leeds United	Northampton
19:45 GMT	L.Davis 28'; N.Bignall 87'	Report	J.Beckford 69'	Stadium: Sixfields Stadium; Attendance: 6,008; Referee: Chris Foy

29 November 2008 18	Northampton Town	1–2	Colchester United	Northampton
15:00 GMT	D.Jackman 53'	Report	C.Platt 23'; P.Reid 26'	Stadium: Sixfields Stadium; Attendance: 4,833; Referee: Karl Evans

6 December 2008 19	Northampton Town	1–1	Leyton Orient	Northampton
15:00 GMT	L.Davis 2'	Report	JJ.Melligan 42'	Stadium: Sixfields Stadium; Attendance: 5,039; Referee: Keith Hill

13 December 2008 20	Scunthorpe United	4–4	Northampton Town	Scunthorpe
15:00 GMT	B.May 13', 51'; G.Hooper 57', 85'	Report	S.McGleish 24'; G.Coke 53'; D.Jackman 57', 85'	Stadium: Glanford Park; Attendance: 3,976; Referee: David Webb

20 December 2008 21	Northampton Town	1–0	Carlisle United	Northampton
15:00 GMT	J.Crowe 63'	Report		Stadium: Sixfields Stadium; Attendance: 4,673; Referee: Phil Gibbs

26 December 2008 22	Southend United	1–0	Northampton Town	Southend-on-Sea
15:00 GMT	J.Stanislas 90'	Report	A.Osman (red card) 72'	Stadium: Roots Hall; Attendance: 7,767; Referee: Pat Miller

28 December 2008 23	Northampton Town	0–0	Bristol Rovers	Northampton
15:00 GMT		Report		Stadium: Sixfields Stadium; Attendance: 5,557; Referee: Simon Hooper

10 January 2009 24	Northampton Town	1–1	Huddersfield Town	Northampton
15:00 GMT	J.Crowe (red card) 75'; A.Akinfenwa 90'	Report	P.Jevons 65'	Stadium: Sixfields Stadium; Attendance: 5,110; Referee: James Linington

16 January 2009 25	Hartlepool United	2–0	Northampton Town	Hartlepool
19:45 GMT	J.Porter 5', 56'	Report		Stadium: Victoria Park; Attendance: 3,814; Referee: Russell Booth

24 January 2009 26	Northampton Town	5–1	Crewe Alexandra	Northampton
15:00 GMT	B.Clarke 2', 55', 70'; D.Jackman 19'; L.Davis 57'	Report	J.Baudet (red card) 18'; C.Daniel 30'	Stadium: Sixfields Stadium; Attendance: 4,675; Referee: Steven Cook

27 January 2009 27	Colchester United	2–1	Northampton Town	Colchester
19:45 GMT	M.Yeates 57'; S.Vernon 58'	Report	A.Akinfenwa 18'; P.Rodgers (red card) 45'	Stadium: Colchester Community Stadium; Attendance: 3,973; Referee: Iain Williamson

31 January 2009 28	Northampton Town	1–2	Leicester City	Northampton
15:00 GMT	L.Constantine 16'		S.Howard 21' (pen.); L.Dyer 73'	Stadium: Sixfields Stadium; Attendance: 7,028; Referee: Mike Dean

14 February 2009 29	Oldham Athletic	2–1	Northampton Town	Oldham
15:00 GMT	R.Hazell 8'; D.Windass 60'	Report	A.Akinfenwa 67'	Stadium: Boundary Park; Attendance: 4,629; Referee: Andy Haines

21 February 2009 30	Northampton Town	0–2	Walsall	Northampton
15:00 GMT		Report	S.Hughes 83'; J.Ibehre 90'	Stadium: Sixfields Stadium; Attendance: 4,528; Referee: Roger East

24 February 2009 31	Brighton & Hove Albion	1–1	Northampton Town	Brighton
19:45 GMT	T.Elphick 57'; A.Virgo (red card) 65'	Report	R.Gilligan 45'; A.Akinfenwa (red card) 65'	Stadium: Withdean Stadium; Attendance: 5,062; Referee: Trevor Kettle

28 February 2009 32	Cheltenham Town	0–1	Northampton Town	Cheltenham
15:00 GMT		Report	J.Crowe 45'	Stadium: Whaddon Road; Attendance: 3,495; Referee: Graham Scott

7 March 2009 33	Northampton Town	1–1	Tranmere Rovers	Northampton
15:00 GMT	A.Holt 52'	Report	B.Savage 32'	Stadium: Sixfields Stadium; Attendance: 4,546; Referee: Craig Pawson

10 March 2009 34	Millwall	1–0	Northampton Town	Millwall, London
15:00 GMT	G.Alexander 35'	Report		Stadium: The Den; Attendance: 6,685; Referee: Grant Hegley

14 March 2009 35	Peterborough United	1–0	Northampton Town	Peterborough
15:00 GMT	G.Zakuani (red card) 7'; C.Lee 33'	Report		Stadium: London Road; Attendance: 8,881; Referee: Clive Oliver

21 March 2009 36	Northampton Town	4–0	Stockport County	Northampton
15:00 GMT	A.Akinfenwa 12'; A.Osman 45'; L.Guttridge 72'; S.Vernon 79'	Report		Stadium: Sixfields Stadium; Attendance: 4,814; Referee: Jarnail Singh

24 March 2009 37	Northampton Town	3–4	Swindon Town	Northampton
19:45 GMT	A.Akinfenwa 3'; D.Jackman 68'; I.Anya 87'	Report	S.Cox 18', 31', 79'; B.Paynter 40'	Stadium: Sixfields Stadium; Attendance: 5,025; Referee: Gavin Ward

28 March 2009 38	Carlisle United	1–1	Northampton Town	Carlisle
15:00 GMT	L.Neal 37'	Report	L.Guttridge 41'	Stadium: Brunton Park; Attendance: 5,254; Referee: Andy D'Urso

31 March 2009 39	Yeovil Town	1–0	Northampton Town	Yeovil
19:45 BST	J.Obika 79'	Report		Stadium: Huish Park; Attendance: 3,884; Referee: Oliver Langford

10 April 2009 40	Bristol Rovers	1–0	Northampton Town	Bristol
19:45 BST	J.Kuffour 72'	Report		Stadium: Memorial Ground; Attendance: 6,666; Referee: Steven Cook

10 April 2009 41	Northampton Town	2–3	Southend United	Northampton
15:00 BST	A.Akinfenwa 50'; A.Prijović 80'	Report	JF.Christophe 38'; T.Robinson 56'; L.Barnard 60'	Stadium: Sixfields Stadium; Attendance: 5,190; Referee: Chris Sarginson

18 April 2009 42	Leyton Orient	1–3	Northampton Town	Leyton, London
15:00 BST	J.Crowe 24' (o.g.)	Report	A.Akinfenwa 71'; A.Prijović 73'; I.Anya 90'	Stadium: Brisbane Road; Attendance: 4,665; Referee: Roger East

21 April 2009 43	Northampton Town	3–3	Scunthorpe United	Northampton
19:45 BST	J.Crowe 38'; I.Anya 60'; P.Hughes 76'	Report	L.Trotter 45'; G.McCann 49' (pen.); M.Sparrow 68'	Stadium: Sixfields Stadium; Attendance: 4,416; Referee: Michael Oliver

25 April 2009 44	Northampton Town	2–1	Hereford United	Northampton
15:00 BST	A.Holt 29'; J.Crowe 69'	Report	A.Williams 51'	Stadium: Sixfields Stadium; Attendance: 5,518; Referee: Steve Bratt

28 April 2009 45	Northampton Town	0–1	Milton Keynes Dons	Northampton
19:45 BST		Report	A.Wilbraham 34'	Stadium: Sixfields Stadium; Attendance: 6,054; Referee: Keith Stroud

2 May 2009 46	Leeds United	3–0	Northampton Town	Leeds
15:00 BST	L.Becchio 44'; J.Beckford 59'; R.Snodgrass 90'	Report		Stadium: Elland Road; Attendance: 34,214; Referee: Andy Penn

=== FA Cup ===
7 November 2008 First round	Leeds United	1–1	Northampton Town	Leeds
19:45 GMT	A.Robinson 37' (pen.)	Report	S.McGleish 9'	Stadium: Elland Road; Attendance: 9,531; Referee: Michael Oliver

17 November 2008 First round (r)	Northampton Town	2–5	Leeds United	Northampton
19:45 GMT	J.Crowe 44', 90'	Report	J.Beckford 13', 45', 55'; M.Hughes 28' (o.g.); B.Parker 41'	Stadium: Sixfields Stadium; Attendance: 3,960; Referee: Phil Crossley

=== League Cup ===
12 August 2008 First round	Millwall	0–1	Northampton Town	Millwall, London
19:45 BST		Report	J.Crowe 16'	Stadium: The Den; Attendance: 3,525; Referee: Clive Penton

26 August 2008 Second round	Bolton Wanderers	1–2	Northampton Town	Bolton
20:00 BST	K.Nolan 82'	Report	A.Akinfenwa 22' (pen.), 28'	Stadium: Reebok Stadium; Attendance: 7,136; Referee: Graham Laws

23 September 2008 Third round	Sunderland	2–2 (a.e.t.) (4–3 p)	Northampton Town	Sunderland
19:45 BST	A.Stokes 86', 90'	Report	C.Larkin 20'; L.Guttridge 81'	Stadium: Stadium of Light; Attendance: 21,082; Referee: Tony Bates
	Penalties
	M.Chopra (penalty scored); D.Murphy (penalty scored); A.Stokes (penalty missed); A.Reid (penalty scored); K.Richardson (penalty scored)		M.Hughes (penalty missed); A.Akinfenwa (penalty scored); L.Davis (penalty scored); A.Osman (penalty scored); L.Constantine (penalty missed)

=== League Trophy ===
2 September 2008 First round (s)	Northampton Town	0–1	Brighton & Hove Albion	Northampton
19:45 BST		Report	K.McLeod 68'	Stadium: Sixfields Stadium; Attendance: 2,047; Referee: Pat Miller

=== Appearances, goals and cards ===
No.	Pos	Player	League One			FA Cup			League Cup			League Trophy			Total			Discipline	
No.	Pos	Player	Starts	Sub	Goals	Starts	Sub	Goals	Starts	Sub	Goals	Starts	Sub	Goals	Starts	Sub	Goals	Booked	Sent off (straight red)
2	RB	Jason Crowe	42	1	5	2	–	2	3	–	1	–	–	–	47	1	8	5	2
3	LB	Danny Jackman	42	1	8	2	–	–	2	1	–	1	–	–	47	2	8	3	–
4	CB	Mark Hughes	41	–	1	2	–	–	3	–	–	1	–	–	47	–	1	4	–
5	CB	Adam Watts	3	2	–	–	–	–	–	–	–	–	–	–	3	2	–	1	–
6	CB	Chris Doig	26	2	1	1	–	–	2	–	–	1	–	–	30	2	1	5	–
7	CM	Giles Coke	25	7	2	1	–	–	2	1	–	1	–	–	30	8	2	3	1
8	ST	Leon Constantine	21	11	3	2	–	–	2	–	–	1	–	–	26	11	3	2	–
9	ST	Colin Larkin	9	12	1	–	–	–	1	–	1	1	–	–	11	12	2	–	–
10	ST	Adebayo Akinfenwa	29	4	13	–	–	–	2	1	2	–	–	–	31	5	15	3	1
11	LM	Andy Holt	28	13	2	2	–	–	2	1	–	1	–	–	33	14	2	3	–
12	RM	Ikechi Anya	6	8	3	–	–	–	–	–	–	–	–	–	6	8	3	1	–
13	GK	Chris Dunn	29	–	–	–	–	–	–	–	–	1	–	–	30	–	–	1	–
14	LM	Liam Davis	21	8	4	1	1	–	2	–	–	–	1	–	24	10	4	6	–
15	CM	Abdul Osman	34	2	2	–	–	–	2	1	–	–	1	–	36	4	2	6	1
17	ST	Aleksandar Prijović	3	7	2	–	–	–	–	–	–	–	–	–	3	7	2	–	–
18	RM	Ryan Gilligan	23	8	3	2	–	–	2	1	–	–	1	–	27	9	3	3	–
19	RB	Liam Dolman	9	5	–	2	–	–	–	1	–	–	–	–	11	6	–	1	–
20	CM	Alex Dyer	5	3	–	–	1	–	–	–	–	1	–	–	6	4	–	1	–
21	CM	Luke Guttridge	23	2	2	1	–	–	2	–	1	1	–	–	27	2	3	5	–
22	ST	Joey Benjamin	–	4	–	–	–	–	–	–	–	–	–	–	–	4	–	–	–
23	RB	Paul Rodgers	9	2	–	–	–	–	–	–	–	–	–	–	9	2	–	2	1
24	RB	Greg Taylor	–	–	–	–	–	–	–	1	–	–	–	–	–	1	–	–	–
25	GK	Paul Walker	–	–	–	–	–	–	–	–	–	–	–	–	–	–	–	–	–
27	RB	Jared Hodgkiss	4	1	–	–	–	–	–	–	–	–	–	–	4	1	–	–	–
Players no longer at the club:
1	GK	Mark Bunn	3	–	–	–	–	–	2	–	–	–	–	–	5	–	–	1	–
5	CB	Gábor Gyepes	2	–	–	–	–	–	1	–	–	–	–	–	3	–	–	1	–
5	CB	Andy Todd	7	–	–	–	–	–	–	–	–	–	–	–	7	–	–	–	–
5	CB	Carl Magnay	1	–	–	–	–	–	–	–	–	–	–	–	1	–	–	–	–
12	RM	Ian Henderson	–	3	–	–	1	–	–	1	–	–	1	–	–	6	–	–	–
16	RB	Mark Little	9	–	–	–	–	–	2	–	–	1	–	–	12	–	–	1	–
16	ST	Scott Vernon	4	2	1	–	–	–	–	–	–	–	–	–	4	2	1	–	–
17	ST	Karl Hawley	11	–	2	–	–	–	–	–	–	–	–	–	11	–	2	1	–
17	ST	Billy Clarke	5	–	3	–	–	–	–	–	–	–	–	–	5	–	3	1	–
23	RB	Ritchie Jones	–	–	–	–	–	–	–	–	–	–	–	–	–	–	–	–	–
26	GK	Frank Fielding	12	–	–	2	–	–	1	–	–	–	–	–	15	–	–	–	–
27	ST	Scott McGleish	7	2	1	2	–	1	–	–	–	–	–	–	9	2	2	–	–
28	ST	Nicholas Bignall	1	4	1	–	2	–	–	–	–	–	–	–	1	6	1	–	–
29	RB	Kyle Walker	9	–	–	–	–	–	–	–	–	–	–	–	9	–	–	1	–
30	LB	Kurt Robinson	–	–	–	–	–	–	–	–	–	–	–	–	–	–	–	–	–
31	GK	Ron-Robert Zieler	2	–	–	–	–	–	–	–	–	–	–	–	2	–	–	–	–
