= Billy Mckay =

Footballer (born 1988)

Billy McKay
Personal information
- Full name: William Robert McKay
- Date of birth: 22 October 1988 (age 38)
- Place of birth: Corby, England
- Height: 5 ft 7 in (1.70 m)
- Position: Striker

Youth career
- 2005–2007: Leicester City

Senior career*
Years	Team	Apps	(Gls)
2007–2009	Leicester City	0	(0)
2008	→ Hinckley United (loan)	2	(1)
2009–2011	Northampton Town	74	(13)
2011–2015	Inverness Caledonian Thistle	121	(54)
2015–2017	Wigan Athletic	10	(0)
2015–2016	→ Dundee United (loan)	29	(12)
2016–2017	→ Oldham Athletic (loan)	23	(0)
2017	→ Inverness Caledonian Thistle (loan)	15	(4)
2017–2021	Ross County	102	(32)
2021–2026	Inverness Caledonian Thistle	165	(41)
Total		541	(157)

International career^{‡}
	Northern Ireland U18	2	(0)
	Northern Ireland U20	3	(1)
2008–2010	Northern Ireland U21	7	(0)
2013–2016	Northern Ireland	11	(0)

Managerial career
- 2024–: Inverness Caledonian Thistle reserves
- * Club domestic league appearances and goals as of 10:09, 3 May 2026 (UTC) ‡ National team caps and goals as of 12 January 2024

William Robert Mckay (born 22 October 1988) is a former professional footballer who is currently the assistant head coach of Scottish Championship club Inverness Caledonian Thistle, and manager of the club's reserve team.

Mckay, who played as a striker, began his career with Leicester City, but was unable to break into the first team, spending some time on loan with Hinckley United. Released by Leicester in 2009, Mckay played for Northampton Town before joining Inverness Caledonian Thistle in Scotland in 2011. After scoring 62 goals for Inverness in three and a half seasons, Mckay was signed by Wigan Athletic in January 2015. He did not hold a regular place with Wigan, and was loaned to Dundee United, Oldham Athletic and Inverness over the next two seasons. Mckay signed for Ross County in July 2017.

Born in England, Mckay has represented the Northern Ireland national team as he qualifies to play for Northern Ireland through ancestry. After representing the country at various youth levels, he made his full international debut in 2013.

== Club career ==
=== Leicester City ===
Mckay was born in Corby. He started his career at Leicester City after being spotted as a youth by scout Bev Ironmonger. At a young age, he was brought into the academy, started to push for the first team and signed a new contract in 2008. Despite impressing with a prolific goalscoring record at academy and reserve team level for Leicester, Mckay was released at the end of the 2008–09 season.

==== Hinckley United (loan) ====
He was loaned, for a month, to Hinckley United of the Conference North, in 2008.

=== Northampton Town ===
Northampton Town gave Mckay a trial during 2009 pre-season, where he impressed by scoring two goals, including an overhead kick, against Coventry City. After this match he was awarded a one-year contract from manager, Stuart Gray.

Mckay also claimed the honour of becoming the first Northampton Town player to score in the 'new' rivalry with Milton Keynes Dons. He netted in a 3–1 defeat at stadium:mk. His first senior goal came during a 3–0 win over Accrington Stanley. After a couple of months coming on as a substitute without scoring – often played out of position – Mckay scored the winner against Dagenham & Redbridge, in the 88th minute, during a 1–0 win on Boxing Day. Four weeks later, on 26 January 2010, he scored and provided an assist for Ryan Gilligan in a 2–1 win over Darlington. This was followed up by a brace in 4–0 win over Accrington Stanley in February.

In late April, Mckay signed a new deal that kept him at Northampton after the club invoked a clause in his contract to keep him. Afterwards, Mckay was happy to confirm his delight at remaining at Northampton Town. At the conclusion of the season, Mckay had made a total of forty-three appearances, including cups, and scored eight goals.

At the beginning of the following season, 2010/11, Mckay revealed his desire to double his scoring tally from the previous campaign. He was given the number 16 shirt, with his previous number 17 jersey being taken by Michael Jacobs. After four games without scoring, Mckay netted his first league goal of the season in a 1–1 draw against Aldershot Town. He also found the target in a 2–0 win over Brighton & Hove Albion in the first round of the League Cup.

On 22 September 2010, Mckay scored Northampton Town's first goal in a memorable League Cup victory over Liverpool at Anfield. Just three days later, he scored again and provided an assist for Ben Tozer in a 2–0 win over Bradford City. Mirroring the previous season, he then suffered a goalscoring drought. However, this was broken when he scored in consecutive games against Lincoln City and Cheltenham Town.

At the season's end, Mckay had made a total of forty-one appearances, including cup competitions, with a return of eight goals. At the culmination of the season, he was offered a new contract, despite eight players leaving the club on free transfers. Two months later, Mckay left Northampton Town, with rumours circulating that he had agreed to join a new club.

=== Inverness Caledonian Thistle ===
After leaving Northampton Town by mutual consent, Mckay signed for Scottish Premier League club Inverness Caledonian Thistle, along with Aaron Doran from Blackburn Rovers. Upon joining, his Inverness career got off to an unfortunate start after suffering an early injury.

He made his debut for the club on 27 August 2011, replacing Doran during the game, in a 2–1 win over Kilmarnock. However, Mckay's initial time at Inverness was mostly spent coming on as a sub – without scoring – and he was often played out of 'position'. Eventually, on 10 December 2011, he scored his first goal for the club, a header against Dundee United in a 3–2 home defeat. After netting his first goal, Mckay stated that he expected to score plenty more goals for the club. Unfortunately, he continued to find himself being used as a substitute. Nevertheless, his patience was rewarded when in April 2012, he scored twice in a 4–3 loss against Kilmarnock. At the end of the season, Mckay signed a two-year contract, just as his current deal was set to expire. In his first season, he made 24 appearances, scoring three times.

The following season, 2012–13, proved to be a breakthrough for Mckay as he went on a goalscoring run and became a key player for the club. In the opening game of the season, he scored in a 2–2 draw against St Mirren and shortly after, in the second round of the Scottish League Cup, he scored with a header during a 1–1 draw against Stenhousemuir – a game in which Inverness won on a penalty shoot-out. A few weeks later, on 19 October 2012, Mckay scored twice in a 4–1 win over Dundee, and from 19 October to 10 November, he hit four goals in three games. Soon after, he scored the winning goal in a 1–0 victory over Celtic. After the match, Manager Terry Butcher claimed that the success was 'magnificent'. In the Highland derby, fourth-round of the Scottish Cup, Inverness CT and Ross County required a replay to separate them, but Mckay grabbed the eventual winner in the replay. At the end of November, he was awarded the SPL – Player of the Month, along with Butcher and Doran, who won the 'Manager of the Month' and 'Young Player of the Month' respectively. A week later, Mckay scored his first career hat-trick, in a 4–4 draw against Dundee United. Between 24 November 2012 and 26 December 2012, he notched ten more goals (including the Scottish Cup) over seven consecutive games. This outstanding level of performance and goalscoring led to him speculatively being linked with English clubs. The transfer rumours led to Butcher offering him a new contract. The manager also stated that Mckay was happy to remain at the club. Furthermore, Butcher claimed his striker was worth more than Celtic's Gary Hooper. On 19 January 2013, Mckay grabbed his first goal of the calendar year and then scored again in a 3–0 win over Aberdeen. In March 2013, he ended any transfer speculation by signing a new two-year deal. Terry Butcher expressed his delight to the media at securing Mckay's future at Inverness. He 'celebrated' his contract extension soon after, in the Highland derby, by slotting home the winning goal from a penalty in a 2–1 win. He led the top-scorer charts for much of the season and had put himself in the running to win the 'Player of the Year' award. Had he done so, Mckay would have become the first man to win it (from a team other than Rangers or Celtic) since 1990, when Jim Bett claimed the award. Ultimately, however, Mckay wasn't included in the shortlist; instead, teammate Andrew Shinnie was one of the four nominees.

By the start of the 2013–14 season, Mckay was linked with a move to Bulgarian club Ludogorets Razgrad following their £375k bid rejected by Inverness CT. Mckay started the 2013–14 season with a goal in each of Inverness CT's first three league games, and eventually five in the opening five fixtures, including a double in a 2–0 win over Hearts. His impressive form continued with the only goal of the game away to Scottish Championship side Dundee in the League Cup, and a double in the 3–0 home victory against Hibernian. At that point, Mckay had a goal-a-game return with nine goals from nine matches. Mckay's prolific start to the season was recognised with the award of SPFL – Player of the Month for September. Mckay then scored two consecutive brace in two games on 12 December 2013 and 21 December 2013 against Hearts and Aberdeen. In the Scottish League Cup final against Aberdeen, Mckay played the whole 90 minutes plus extra time before the game eventually reached a penalty shoot-out. Aberdeen won the match and the Cup after Mckay and Greg Tansey missed their penalties in the shoot-out. Mckay had successfully converted in the penalty-shootout in the semi-final against Hearts. Six days after the Scottish League Cup Final, Mckay bounced back when he scored the only goal in a 1–0 win against Partick Thistle. Two weeks later on 4 April 2014, he provided assist for Doran before scoring the winning goal, in a 2–1 win over rivals, Ross County. In a 1–1 draw against Dundee United on 3 May 2014, Mckay was captain for the match in absence of Richie Foran. He finished the campaign with 22 goals from 46 appearances.

Ahead of the 2014–15 season, Mckay continued to be linked with a move away from Inverness, with clubs in Europe were keen to sign him, as Manager John Hughes said clubs keen to sign Mckay would need to have "exceptional offers". In the 2014–15 season, Mckay started the season when he scored his first goal of the season, in a 2–0 win over Hamilton Academical. However, Mckay struggle to score goals and it took until 8 November 2014 for Mckay to score twice, in a 4–2 win over Hamilton Academical. Mckay went on to score four goals in three appearances between 8 November 2014 and 6 December 2014 against Motherwell and Dundee. Between 1 January 2015 and 24 January 2015, Mckay scored five goals and five appearances, including a double against Kilmarnock.

With his contract due to expire at the end of the 2014–15 season, Inverness agreed to sell Mckay to Wigan Athletic in January 2015 for a deal in the region of £150,000.

=== Wigan Athletic ===
It was later confirmed that Mckay signed for Wigan Athletic on 30 January 2015. Following his move, Mckay was given the number 10 shirt. Mckay made his Wigan Athletic debut the next day, when he came on as a substitute for Martyn Waghorn in the 78th minute, in a 0–0 draw against Ipswich Town. However, Mckay struggled to score and only made nine appearances for the club, eight of them as a substitute. Not only that, Wigan Athletic were relegated to League One at the end of the season.

Ahead of the 2015–16 season Mckay was once again in the transfer spotlight when he was linked with a move back to the Scottish Premiership, with Dundee United making a bid for him. The Dundee United manager Jackie McNamara then said that Wigan had rejected two bids his club had made for Mckay. These bids were rejected despite it appearing likely that Mckay's first team opportunities would be limited following the arrivals of Will Grigg and Craig Davies. Mckay then scored his first Wigan Athletic goal in a pre-season friendly match against Altrincham on 14 July 2015. Mckay then had his shirt number changed from 10 to 19, with his number 10 shirt being given to Davies.

==== Dundee United (loan) ====
On 27 August 2015, Dundee United agreed a fee of around £200,000 with Wigan to sign Mckay. He signed for Dundee United the following day, but on a season-long loan deal rather than a permanent contract having reportedly failed to negotiate a severance agreement with Wigan. One day after signing for the club, Mckay made his debut in a 2–1 defeat away to Ross County.

==== Oldham Athletic (loan) ====
On 13 July 2016, Mckay signed for League One club Oldham Athletic on a season-long loan. He made his first appearance for Latics in a pre-season friendly against Huddersfield Town. He scored his first goal for Oldham in an EFL Trophy tie against Carlisle United on 30 August 2016.

==== Inverness Caledonian Thistle return (loan) ====
Mckay returned to Inverness on loan on 31 January 2017. He scored a spectacular overhead kick to give Caley the win over Rangers on 24 February 2017, ending their winless streak that stood 15 matches, which started in October 2016.

=== Ross County ===
Mckay signed a two-year contract with Ross County in July 2017, moving from Wigan Athletic on a free transfer, despite having a year to run on his Wigan contract. Mckay was released by County on 27 May 2021 along with nine other players.

=== Inverness Caledonian Thistle (third spell) ===
On 16 June 2021, Mckay re-signed for Inverness Caledonian Thistle on a two-year deal.

On 25 April 2022, Mckay was named in the PFA Championship Team of the Year.

On 17 September 2022, Mckay surpassed Barry Wilson to become the club's 2nd all-time goal scorer, adding his 83rd goal in all competitions, with a goal in a 3–2 away win against Dundee in the Scottish Championship.

Mckay scored his 99th and 100th Inverness goals in their 3–0 Scottish Cup semi-final win over Falkirk on 29 April 2023.

On 26 July 2023, Mckay became Inverness record goalscorer with his 102nd goal for the club in a 3-2 defeat against Airdrie.

On 17 August 2024, Mckay made his 300th appearance for the club against Montrose.

On 24 October 2024, Mckay was appointed as assistant manager to interim manager, Scott Kellacher, after manager Duncan Ferguson was sacked by administrators.

On 7 August 2026, Mckay confirmed his retirement from professional football citing that he would remain at Inverness Caledonian Thistle as an assistant head coach.

== International career ==
Mckay was called up to the Northern Ireland national under-21 football team for the 2011 European Championship qualifiers against the Czech Republic and Iceland. He didn't play in the first match against the Czech Republic but started against Iceland in a 6–2 defeat. His first win playing for Northern Ireland came in a 3–0 success against San Marino.

Mckay was selected for the senior Northern Ireland squad in November 2012, and made his full international début in February 2013 in a friendly against Malta.

== Career statistics ==
=== Club ===
As of match played 29 July 2023

Appearances and goals by club, season and competition
Club	Season	League			National cup (Note: Includes FA Cup, Scottish Cup)		League cup (Note: Includes League Cup, Scottish League Cup)		Othe		Total	
Club	Season	Division	Apps	Goals	Apps	Goals	Apps	Goals	Apps	Goals	Apps	Goals
Leicester City	2007–08	Championship	0	0	0	0	0	0	—		0	0
Leicester City	2008–09	League One	0	0	0	0	0	0	0	0	0	0
Leicester City	Total		0	0	0	0	0	0	0	0	0	0
Hinckley United (loan)	2007–08	Conference North	2	1	0	0	—		0	0	2	1
Northampton Town	2009–10	League Two	40	8	1	0	1	0	1 (Note: Appearances in Football League Trophy)	0	43	8
Northampton Town	2010–11	League Two	34	5	2	1	4	2	1	0	41	8
Northampton Town	Total		74	13	3	1	5	2	2	0	84	16
Inverness Caledonian Thistle	2011–12	Scottish Premier League	22	3	2	0	0	0	—		24	3
Inverness Caledonian Thistle	2012–13	Scottish Premier League	38	23	3	3	4	1	—		45	27
Inverness Caledonian Thistle	2013–14	Scottish Premiership	38	18	4	3	4	1	—		46	22
Inverness Caledonian Thistle	2014–15	Scottish Premiership	23	10	2	0	1	0	—		26	10
Inverness Caledonian Thistle	Total		121	54	11	6	9	2	—		141	62
Wigan Athletic	2014–15	Championship	9	0	0	0	0	0	—		9	0
Wigan Athletic	2015–16	League One	1	0	0	0	1	0	0	0	2	0
Wigan Athletic	2016–17	Championship	0	0	0	0	0	0	—		0	0
Wigan Athletic	Total		10	0	0	0	1	0	0	0	11	0
Dundee United (loan)	2015–16	Scottish Premiership	29	12	4	1	2	0	—		35	13
Oldham Athletic (loan)	2016–17	League One	26	0	2	2	0	0	5 (Note: Appearances in EFL Trophy)	2	33	4
Inverness Caledonian Thistle (loan)	2016–17	Scottish Premiership	15	4	1	0	0	0	—		16	4
Ross County	2017–18	Scottish Premiership	23	3	1	0	0	0	—		24	3
Ross County	2018–19	Scottish Championship	24	17	3	0	4	1	3 (Note: Appearance(s) in Scottish Challenge Cup)	2	34	20
Ross County	2019–20	Scottish Premiership	27	7	1	0	5	4	—		33	11
Ross County	2020–21	Scottish Premiership	28	5	1	1	6	1	—		35	7
Ross County	Total		102	32	6	1	15	6	3	2	126	41
Inverness Caledonian Thistle	2021–22	Scottish Championship	32	9	2	1	0	0	9 (Note: Three appearances and five goals in Scottish Challenge Cup, six appearances in Scottish Premiership play-offs)	5	43	15
Inverness Caledonian Thistle	2022–23	Scottish Championship	34	13	5	5	5	1	1	0	45	19
Inverness Caledonian Thistle	2023–24	Scottish Championship	0	0	0	0	3	2	0	0	3	2
Inverness Caledonian Thistle	Total		66	22	7	6	8	3	10	5	91	36
Career total			445	137	33	17	40	13	20	9	538	176

=== International ===
As of match played 28 August 2019

Appearances and goals by national team and year
National team	Year	Apps	Goals
Northern Ireland	2013	4	0
Northern Ireland	2014	5	0
Northern Ireland	2015	1	0
Northern Ireland	2016	1	0
Total		11	0

== Honours ==
Ross County

- Scottish Championship: 2018–19
- Scottish Challenge Cup: 2018–19

Individual

- SPL Player of the Month: November 2012, September 2013
- SPFL Championship Player of the Month: October 2018
- SPFL Premiership Player of the Month: February 2020
