= Abdul Osman =

Ghanaian footballer

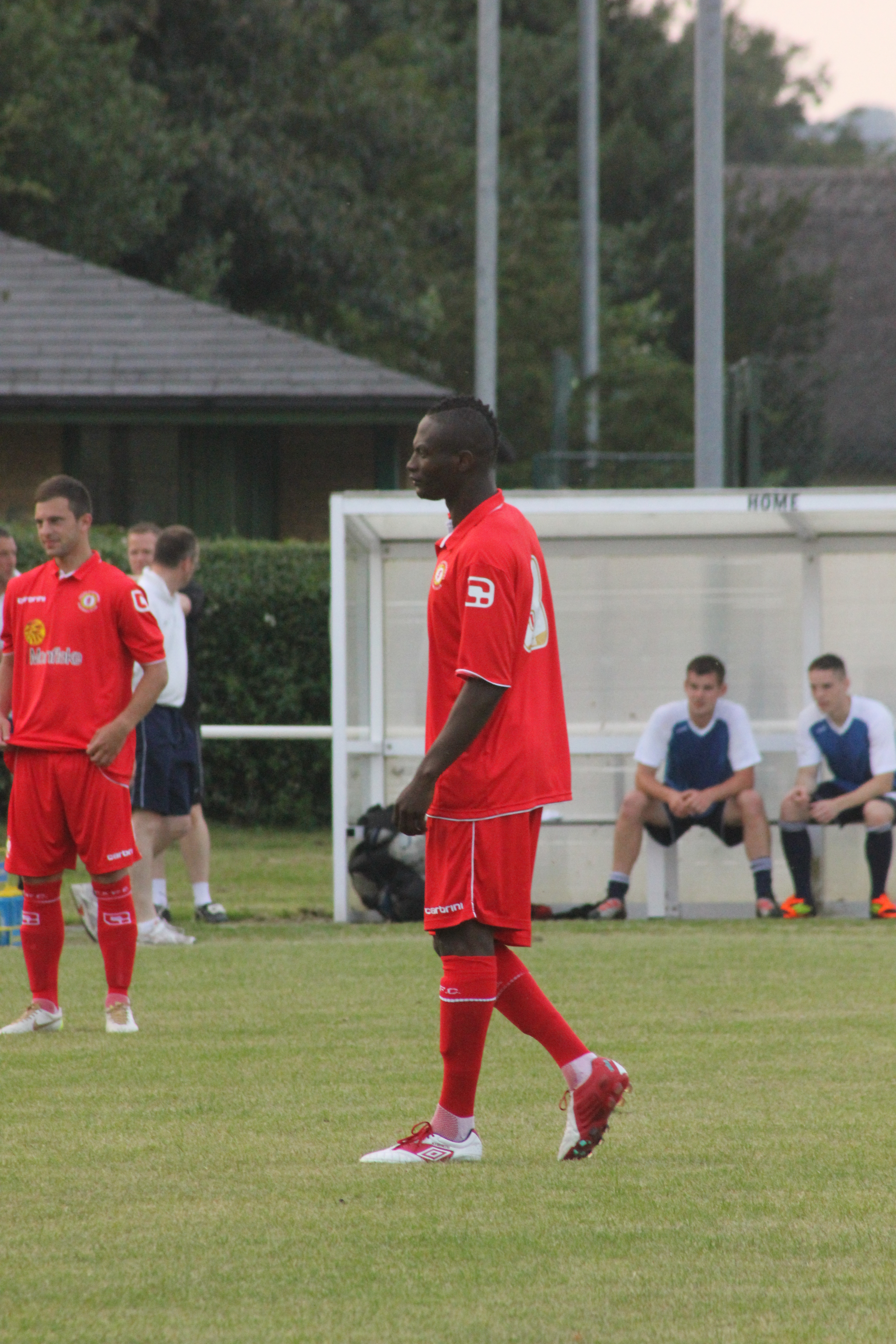
- Osman in 2012

Personal information
- Full name: Abdul Haq Bin Seidu Osman
- Date of birth: 27 February 1987 (age 39)
- Place of birth: Accra, Ghana
- Height: 6 ft 2 in (1.88 m)
- Position: Midfielder

Team information
- Current team: Sholing

Youth career
- 2005–2006: Watford

Senior career*
Years	Team	Apps	(Gls)
2004–2005	Hampton & Richmond Borough	9	(0)
2005–2007	Maidenhead United	33	(2)
2007–2008	Gretna	18	(1)
2008–2011	Northampton Town	104	(7)
2011–2012	Kerkyra	27	(1)
2012–2014	Crewe Alexandra	69	(0)
2014–2018	Partick Thistle	111	(2)
2018	Lamia	5	(0)
2018–2019	Falkirk	15	(0)
2019–2020	Queen of the South	11	(0)
2020	Dartford	2	(0)
2021	Brechin City	8	(0)
2021–2022	Walton Casuals	33	(1)
2022–2023	Sittingbourne	20	(0)
2023–2024	Hanwell Town	27	(2)
2024–	Sholing	0	(0)
- * Club domestic league appearances and goals as of 18:04, 29 August 2024 (UTC)

Abdul Haq Bin Seidu Osman (born 27 February 1987) is a former Ghanaian footballer who most notably played professionally for Crewe Alexandra and Partick Thistle.

== Career ==
=== Early career ===
Osman started his career at Hampton & Richmond Borough before he moved on to play at youth level for Watford, before signing for Maidenhead United. After leaving the Magpies, Osman then signed for Gretna in the summer of 2007, signing a 12-month contract with the Anvils, scoring one goal versus Motherwell. Osman was then a free agent after the Anvils entered administration and he attracted interest from a number of clubs, with Leeds United, Ipswich Town and Brighton all reported to be keen on him, as well as various clubs from Scotland.

=== Northampton Town ===
In June 2008, Osman signed for Northampton Town after he failed a medical with Kilmarnock. On 22 September 2010, Osman netted the winning penalty-kick at Anfield Stadium, as the Cobblers knocked Liverpool out of the League Cup. In May 2011, along with seven other players, Osman was informed that his contract would not be renewed by the club.

=== Kerkyra ===
In July 2011, Osman then went on trial at Super League Greece club Kerkyra and signed a 2 1/2-year contract in August 2011.

=== Crewe Alexandra ===
On 25 July 2012, Osman then joined Crewe Alexandra on a two-year contract.

=== Partick Thistle ===
After being released by the Railwaymen in 2014, Osman went on trial with Partick Thistle, before signing for the Harry Wraggs on 23 July 2014. Osman scored his first goal for the Firhill club on 13 September 2014, in a 3–1 win versus Inverness Caledonian Thistle, heading in from a corner to give his club a 2–1 lead. On 15 May 2015, Osman signed a new one-year contract with the Harry Wraggs, keeping him at the club until the end of the 2015-16 season. Osman was then appointed club captain at the beginning of the 2015–16 season. Osman was then sent-off in Thistle's 2–1 win versus St Johnstone. Thistle were relegated via the play-offs at the end of the 2017-18 season. Following the club's relegation, Osman was one of many players released by Thistle.

=== Lamia ===
On 17 August 2018, Osman returned to the Super League, signing a contract with Lamia.

=== Falkirk ===
On 2 January 2019, after being released by Lamia during November 2018, Osman signed for Scottish Championship club Falkirk on 2 January 2019 until the end of the 2018-19 season.

=== Queen of the South ===
On 4 October 2019, after training with Dumfries club Queen of the South for a few weeks, Osman signed a short-term contract until 11 January 2020 and debuted against his former club Partick Thistle, as a second-half substitute. On 10 January 2020, Osman extended his contract with Queens until 30 June 2020.

=== Dartford ===
On 2 October 2020, Osman joined Dartford. On 27 November 2020, Dartford confirmed Osman had left the club to return home to his family in Scotland.

=== Brechin City ===
On 20 January 2021, Osman returned to Scottish football and signed with League Two side Brechin City.

=== Walton Casuals ===
Osman joined Walton Casuals at the start of the 2021–22 season.

=== Sittingbourne ===
On July 7, 2022, Osman joined Sittingbourne ahead of the start of the 2022–23 season.

=== Hanwell Town ===
On 21 February 2023, Osman signed for Southern Football League side Hanwell Town.

== Coaching career ==
After retiring from football, Osman moved into coaching. In June 2026, Osman was named first team coach at Combined Counties Football League Premier Division North side Northwood, working under manager Manny Williams.

== Career statistics ==
As of 28 June 2022

Appearances and goals by club, season and competition
Club	Season	League			National Cup		League Cup		Other		Total	
Club	Season	Division	Apps	Goals	Apps	Goals	Apps	Goals	Apps	Goals	Apps	Goals
Gretna	2007–08	Scottish Premier League	18	1	1	0	1	0	—		20	1
Northampton Town	2008–09	League One	36	2	0	0	3	0	1 (Note: Appearances in the Football League Trophy)	0	40	2
Northampton Town	2009–10	League Two	30	2	0	0	1	0	2	0	33	2
Northampton Town	2010–11	League Two	38	3	2	0	4	0	1	0	45	3
Northampton Town	Northampton Town Total		104	7	2	0	8	0	4	0	118	7
Kerkyra	2011–12	Super League Greece	27	1	0	0	—		—		27	1
Crewe Alexandra	2012–13	League One	38	0	2	0	2	0	5	0	47	0
Crewe Alexandra	2013–14	League One	31	0	2	0	1	0	2	0	36	0
Crewe Alexandra	Crewe Alexandra Total		69	0	4	0	3	0	7	0	83	0
Partick Thistle	2014–15	Scottish Premiership	34	1	2	0	3	0	—		39	1
Partick Thistle	2015–16	Scottish Premiership	33	0	2	0	1	0	—		36	0
Partick Thistle	2016–17	Scottish Premiership	31	1	3	1	1	0	—		35	2
Partick Thistle	2017–18	Scottish Premiership	13	0	2	0	3	0	—		18	0
Partick Thistle	Partick Thistle Total		111	2	9	1	8	0	0	0	128	3
Lamia	2018–19	Super League Greece	5	0	0	0	0	0	0	0	5	0
Falkirk	2018–19	Scottish Championship	15	0	0	0	0	0	0	0	15	0
Queen of the South	2019–20	Scottish Championship	11	0	0	0	0	0	0	0	11	0
Dartford	2020–21	National League South	2	0	1	0	—		0	0	3	0
Brechin City	2020–21	Scottish League Two	8	0	0	0	0	0	2 (Note: Appearances in the Scottish League Two play-offs)	0	10	0
Walton Casuals	2021–22	SFL Premier Division South	33	1	0	0	—		0	0	33	1
Sittingbourne	2022–23	Isthmian League South East Division	0	0	0	0	—		0	0	0	0
Career Total			395	12	17	1	20	0	11	0	443	13

== Honours ==
Crewe Alexandra

- Football League Trophy: 2012–13
