= Liam Davis (footballer, born 1986) =

English footballer

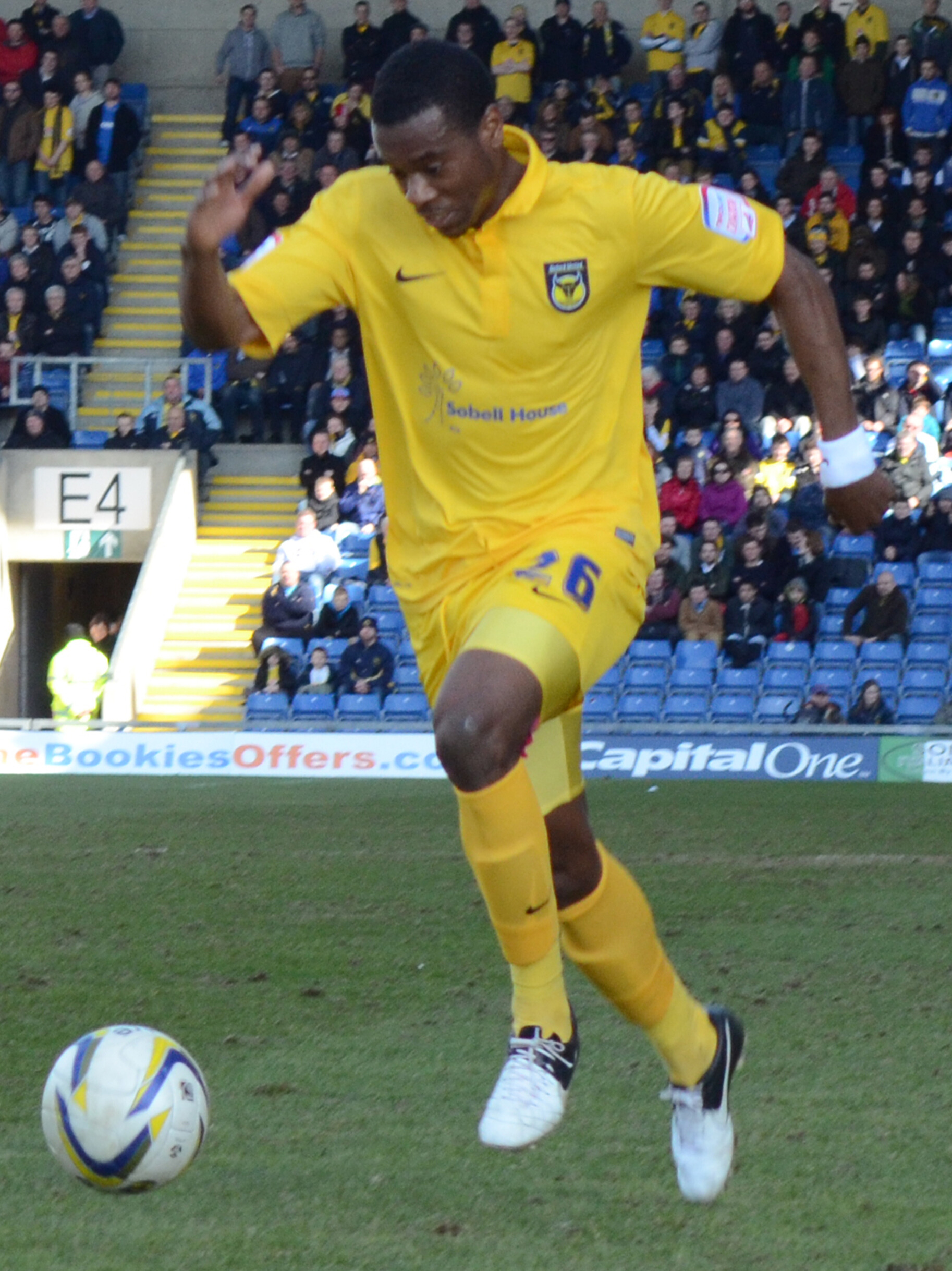
- Davis playing for Oxford United in 2013

Personal information
- Full name: Liam Lloyd Davis
- Date of birth: 23 November 1986 (age 39)
- Place of birth: Wandsworth, England
- Height: 6 ft 1 in (1.85 m)
- Positions: Midfielder; defender

Youth career
- 2001–2002: Fulham
- 2002–2005: Coventry City

Senior career*
Years	Team	Apps	(Gls)
2005–2008	Coventry City	11	(0)
2006	→ Peterborough United (loan)	7	(0)
2008–2011	Northampton Town	79	(8)
2011–2013	Oxford United	67	(3)
2013–2015	Yeovil Town	35	(1)
2016–2017	GAIS	18	(2)
2017	Cheltenham Town	16	(0)
2017–2021	Torquay United	91	(3)
Total		324	(17)
- * Club domestic league appearances and goals

Liam Lloyd Davis (born 23 November 1986) is an English former professional footballer who most recently played for National League club Torquay United.

== Career ==
=== Coventry City ===
Davis joined Coventry City as a 16-year-old trainee from Fulham's Academy. He made his Coventry debut on 24 September 2005, aged 18, in a Football League Championship clash against Hull City at the Ricoh Arena. In March 2006, Davis was offered a new contract and eventually signed a new deal two months later.

Davis then spent the start of the 2006–07 campaign on loan at Football League Two outfit Peterborough United on 14 September 2006. Two days after signing for the club, Davis made his Peterborough United debut, where he set up a goal for Trevor Benjamin to score the winning goal against Swindon Town. His playing time at Peterborough United earned him a loan extension for another month. After playing 7 games, Davis was dropped from the first team and ended his loan spell with Peterborough United and was sidelined with injuries for a long time.

After returning to his parent club, Davis then made his first appearance of the 2006–07 season, starting the whole game, in a 4–1 win over Barnsley on 17 March 2007. He returned to feature in three first-team matches for Coventry under Iain Dowie at the tail-end of the season and signed a new one-year deal at the club in May 2007.

He had made rapid progress since arriving in the Midlands, but injuries restricted his progress in the first half of 2007–08 season. However, an impressive substitute appearance in a 2–1 in over Ipswich Town in December prompted an extended run in the side, both on the left wing and in an unaccustomed role at left-back.

At the end of the 2007/08 season, Davis was told his contract would not be renewed and he was free to find a new club as then manager Chris Coleman did not think he would feature regularly in his plans.

=== Northampton Town ===
Davis then signed for Football League One side Northampton Town on a two-year contract on 6 June 2008.

Davis made his Northampton Town debut, where he started and played for 78 minutes, in a 4–2 win over Cheltenham Town in the opening game of the season. After missing out one match, he scored his first Northampton Town goal, just 25 minutes after coming on as a substitute, in a 3–2 loss against Huddersfield Town on 20 September 2008. By the end of 2008, Davis added two more goals, which were against Leeds United and Leyton Orient. His fourth goal of the season came on 24 January 2009, in a 5–1 win over Crewe Alexandra. Despite suffering from injuries later in the 2008–09 season, he finished his first season, making thirty–three appearances and scored four times in all competitions.

Ahead of the 2009–10 season, Davis suffered a metatarsal injury during the pre–season tour. He remained sidelined until he made his return to action from injury in a reserve match in mid–October. He returned to the first team on 31 October 2009, coming on as a second–half substitute, in a 1–0 loss against Torquay United. However, his return was short–lived when he, once again, suffered "a recurrence of the stress fracture in his foot". It wasn't until on 9 February 2010 when he returned to the first team from injury, coming on as a second–half substitute, in a 4–0 win over Accrington Stanley. As a result, Davis's second season restricted him to only 46 appearances in the two seasons but he showed glimpses of his talent through his goals against Grimsby Town and Morecambe during the 2009/10 season.

Despite missing out most of the season with injuries during the 2009–10 season, Davis signed a one-year contract extension in June 2010. In the 2010–11 season, Davis played his first match from injury, in the opening game of the season, in a 3–0 win over Torquay United. However, he was dropped from the squad following his public bust-up with the manager in a match against Yeovil Town and his own injury concern. The season brought a good cup run which saw Northampton Town beat Premier League giants Liverpool at Anfield, where Davis put in a performance that gained recognition from clubs in higher leagues. Davis then scored his first goal of the season on 26 October 2010, in a 3–1 loss against Ipswich Town in the third round of the League Cup. However, Davis was sent–off just nine minutes to the game, in a 4–1 loss against Barnet on 20 November 2010. Following this, Davis began playing in a defensive positions and helped the club with three clean–sheets between 30 October 2010 and 13 November 2010. He played most of the season in the left–back position. Despite setback of injuries later in the season, Davis scored two goals later in the season against Rotherham United and Stevenage.

On 13 May 2011, it was announced that Davis would be leaving Northampton at the end of his contract.

=== Oxford United ===
On 29 July 2011, Davis signed a one-year deal with Oxford United.

Davis made his Oxford United debut, making his first start and playing the whole game, in a 1–0 loss against Rotherham United in the opening game of the season. It wasn't until on 3 September 2011 when he scored his first Oxford United goal, in a 3–1 loss against Crewe. Then on 17 September 2011, he scored again, in a 2–0 win over Barnet. From that moment, he quickly established himself in the first team, playing in defence. By the end of 2011, he went on twenty–four appearances in all competitions despite being sent–off against Cheltenham Town on 26 November 2011, in which he served a two match ban, and absent for fitness concern. Davis continued to be in a first team regular for the side, leading him to sign a one–year contract extension in February 2012. In his first season at Oxford United, Davis went on to make forty–six appearances and scoring two times in all competitions.

Ahead of the 2012–13 season, Davis, however, suffered groin injury following an operation that failed to clear up the injury initially at the end of the 2011–12 season. It wasn't until on 6 November 2012 when he made his first team return from injury, coming on as a second-half substitute, in a 3–2 loss against Dagenham & Redbridge. This followed up against Torquay United on 10 November 2012 when he made his first start, in a 0–0 draw. However, his return was short–lived, as he was sidelined on four occasions. Nevertheless, Davis continued to be a first team regular for the side, playing in the attacking role. It wasn't until on 12 February 2013 when he scored his first goal of the season, in a 2–1 loss against Fleetwood Town. At the end of the 2012–13 season, Davis went on to make twenty–seven appearances and scoring once in all competitions.

Having been among players whose contracts run out at the end of the 2012–13 season, Davis was among several players to be released by the club.

=== Yeovil Town ===
After spending time on trial with Birmingham City, Davis signed for newly promoted Championship side Yeovil Town on a two-year contract. He made his Yeovil Town debut as a second-half substitute in their 1–0 victory over Millwall, on 3 August 2013. He scored his first goal for Yeovil on 5 October 2013, in a 4–1 loss against Middlesbrough. Davis soon suffered a setback of injuries and was absent from the first team for several weeks. He made thirty appearances, scoring once, in a 2013–14 season that saw Yeovil relegated.

Shortly after the start of the 2014–15 season Davis suffered a broken wrist that kept him out for a month. Although he returned to the first team in September, he continued to suffer from injuries, leading him to be absent from the first team for most of the season. He made just nine appearances over the whole of 2014–15 season, and left the club following their relegation to League Two.

=== GAIS ===
Ahead of the 2016 season, Davis signed for Swedish Superettan side GAIS. He scored on his GAIS debut, a 2–0 win over IK Frej. He made 18 appearances over the whole of 2016, scoring twice, and was released by the club at the end of the season.

=== Cheltenham Town ===
On 30 January 2017, Davis signed a short-term contract with Cheltenham Town. He made his debut the next day, playing the whole of a 3–2 win over Luton Town. Davis went on to make sixteen appearances for the club, but was released at the end of the 2016–17.

=== Torquay United ===
Following his release from Cheltenham, in June 2017 Davis signed for National League club Torquay United. He was released by the club in June 2021, having missed the whole of his final season with the club through injury.

== Career statistics ==
As of match played 9 November 2019

Appearances and goals by club, season and competition
Club	Season	League			FA Cup		League Cup		Other		Total	
Club	Season	Division	Apps	Goals	Apps	Goals	Apps	Goals	Apps	Goals	Apps	Goals
Coventry City	2005–06	Championship	2	0	0	0	0	0	—		2	0
Coventry City	2006–07	Championship	3	0	0	0	0	0	—		3	0
Coventry City	2007–08	Championship	6	0	1	0	0	0	—		7	0
Coventry City	Total		11	0	1	0	0	0	—		12	0
Peterborough United (loan)	2006–07	League Two	7	0	0	0	1	0	0	0	8	0
Northampton Town	2008–09	League One	29	4	2	0	2	0	1 (Note: Appearances in Football League Trophy)	0	34	4
Northampton Town	2009–10	League Two	17	2	1	0	0	0	1	0	19	2
Northampton Town	2010–11	League Two	33	2	2	0	2	1	1	0	38	3
Northampton Town	Total		79	8	5	0	4	1	3	0	91	9
Oxford United	2011–12	League Two	44	2	0	0	1	0	1	0	46	2
Oxford United	2012–13	League Two	23	1	2	0	0	0	2	0	27	1
Oxford United	Total		67	3	2	0	1	0	3	0	73	3
Yeovil Town	2013–14	Championship	27	1	1	0	2	0	—		30	1
Yeovil Town	2014–15	League One	8	0	1	0	0	0	0	0	9	0
Yeovil Town	Total		35	1	2	0	2	0	0	0	39	1
GAIS	2016	Superettan	18	2	0	0	—		0	0	18	2
Cheltenham Town	2016–17	League Two	16	0	0	0	0	0	0	0	16	0
Torquay United	2017–18	National League	33	0	1	0	—		0	0	34	0
Torquay United	2018–19	National League South	42	1	4	0	—		2 (Note: Appearances in FA Trophy)	0	48	1
Torquay United	2019–20	National League	16	2	2	0	—		0	0	18	2
Torquay United	2020–21	National League	0	0	0	0	—		0	0	0	0
Torquay United	Total		91	3	7	0	—		2	0	100	3
Career totals			324	17	17	0	8	1	8	0	357	18

== Personal life ==
Davis said he resided in Northampton and even still lives there after leaving Northampton Town in 2011.

Davis' cousin is Kieron Cadogan, who played alongside him at GAIS, and was responsible for Davis signing for the club.
