= Billy Lumley =

English footballer

Personal information
- Full name: William Daniel Lumley
- Date of birth: 28 December 1989 (age 36)
- Place of birth: Loughton, England
- Height: 6 ft 6 in (1.98 m)
- Position: Goalkeeper

Youth career
- ?–2008: Wolverhampton Wanderers

Senior career*
Years	Team	Apps	(Gls)
2009	Grays Athletic	0	(0)
2009	Stafford Rangers	?	(?)
2009–2010	Northampton Town	2	(0)
2010	Eastleigh	?	(?)
2010	Billericay Town	?	(?)
2010–2011	Jerez Industrial	18	(0)
2011–2013	Maidenhead United	68	(0)
2013–2015	Billericay Town		
- * Club domestic league appearances and goals as of 07:25, 10 January 2013 (UTC)

William Daniel Lumley (born 28 December 1989) is an English footballer who played as a goalkeeper mainly in England.

== Career ==
=== Early career ===
Born in Loughton, Essex, Lumley started his career as a youth player at Tottenham Hotspur, and Wolverhampton Wanderers, before joining the Glenn Hoddle Academy in Spain following his release in 2008.Glenn Hoddle commented on the player saying; "Billy impressed me as a goalkeeper with his all-round ability during the selection process" and "he not only demonstrated his vision and shot stopping prowess, but also his willingness to learn, something critical to his future success". In July 2009, Lumley joined Brentford on trial, although was not offered a contract. Alongside eight other players, Lumley joined Conference National side Grays Athletic on 5 August 2009, before joining Conference North team Stafford Rangers. He made his debut for the club, starting the whole game, in a 4–1 win against Harrogate Town on 19 September 2009. Lumley made one more appearance for Strafford Rangers before leaving the club in November 2009.

Lamley had an unsuccessful trial at Swansea City in November 2009, before joining Northampton Town on non-contract terms on 23 December. Northampton manager, Ian Sampson claimed that Lumley was interesting a number of clubs and tried to sign him before he joined Wolves. Lumley made his Football League debut on 20 February 2010 for Northampton Town in the 3–2 away loss to Crewe Alexandra. He made another appearance for the club (and his last) against Hereford United in a follow–up match and set up a goal for Adebayo Akinfenwa, in a 2–0 win.

Lumley joined Conference South club Eastleigh in March 2010, making his debut against St Albans City on 6 March. His last game for Eastleigh was the 2–0 defeat to Woking on 5 April 2010.

The following season, 2010–11, Lumley had a short spell at Isthmian League Premier Division club Billericay Town before moving to Jerez Industrial. In 18 appearances for Jerez, he conceded 18 goals. In March 2011, Lumley went on trial with AFC Bournemouth. His trial with the club was extended until the end of the 2010–11 season. However, AFC Bournemouth decided against signing Lumley.

=== Maidenhead United ===
On 19 August 2011, Lumley signed for Maidenhead United.

He made his debut for the club, starting the whole game, in a 1–0 win against Bromley on 20 August 2011. However, Lumley found himself as Maidenhead United’s second-choice goalkeeper behind Sam Beasant. He soon regained his place as the club’s first-choice goalkeeper for the next four months. However during a match against Thurrock on 18 February 2012, Lumley suffered a head injury and was out for several weeks. After making his return from injury against Dartford on 13 March 2012, he quickly recovered and retained his first choice goalkeeper status for the rest of the 2011–12 season. Poor results eventually saw Maidenhead United initially relegated but stayed in the league. At the end of the 2011–12 season, Lumley signed a contract extension with the club for another season.

In the 2012–13 season, Lumley continued to remain as Maidenhead United’s first-choice goalkeeper. In a match against Hornchurch on 2 October 2012, he received a straight red card, in a 4–2 loss. Despite the red card, Lumley continued to remain as the club’s first choice goalkeeper. However, the arrival of Jesse Joronen led to him losing his place as Maidenhead United’s first choice goalkeeper for the rest of 2012. On 5 January 2013, he returned to the starting line–up, playing the whole game, in a 2–1 win against Chelmsford City. Following the departure of Joronen, Lumley regained his place as Maidenhead United’s first choice goalkeeper for the rest of 2012–13 season. Despite suffering from a finger injury, he eventually recovered and helped the club avoid relegation once again. At the end of the 2012–13 season, it was announced that Lumley would remain at Maidenhead United for another season.

In August 2013, Lumley had been released by mutual consent because he didn't want to fight for a first team spot with new signing Elvijs Putnins.

=== Billericay Town ===
Shortly after, Lumley joined Billericay Town for the second time and kept his first clean sheet, in a 2–0 win against Leiston. He quickly became the club’s first choice goalkeeper throughout the 2013–14 season.

In the 2014–15 season, Lumley found himself in a competition with Marko Cancar. However, he suffered a shoulder injury that saw him out for the start of the season. Following his return from injury, Lumley regained his place as Billericay Town’s first choice goalkeeper. On 19 January 2015, the club announced his departure, as it was revealed that he’s moving to Australia. Lumley played his last match for Billericay Town, in a 3–0 win against Metropolitan Police on 7 February 2015. Shortly after, his departure from the club was confirmed.

== Personal life ==
Growing up, Lumley is an older of Joe Lumley and together, they would spend hours imitating Shay Given's saves in his back garden. He also lived in Spain in younger years. Lumley was also a boyhood Tottenham Hotspur supporter.

Outside of football, Lumley works as a personal trainer. Since moving to Australia, he started out working for a private sports business before running his own goalkeeper academy.
