= Ryan Gilligan =

English footballer (born 1987)

Personal information
- Full name: Ryan James Gilligan
- Date of birth: 18 January 1987 (age 39)
- Place of birth: Swindon, England
- Position: Attacking midfielder

Youth career
- 2003–2005: Watford

Senior career*
Years	Team	Apps	(Gls)
2005–2012	Northampton Town	181	(20)
2011	→ Torquay United (loan)	5	(0)
2011	→ Newport County (loan)	6	(0)
2012–2013	Östersund	22	(3)
2013	Brage	5	(1)
2014	Dalkurd	21	(0)
2015	Umeå	22	(0)
2016–2017	PS Kemi	28	(1)
2017–2018	TP-47	33	(6)

International career
2002	England U16	2	(0)
- * Club domestic league appearances and goals as of 11:34, 15 October 2018 (UTC)

Ryan James Gilligan (born 18 January 1987) is an English footballer who plays as an attacking midfielder.

== Personal life ==
Gilligan's father, Jimmy Gilligan, was also a professional footballer and is the current head coach of the Nike Football Academy. He started his career at Watford just like Ryan and played most notably for the Welsh clubs Cardiff City and Swansea City.

== Career ==
Born in Swindon, Wiltshire, Gilligan joined the Watford Academy at the age of 16 before Northampton Town took over the third year of his scholarship in August 2005 after being tracked by then manager Colin Calderwood. In his first professional season, Gilligan was used mostly as a striker from the bench. He did however score four goals in part of the promotion side that finished second in League Two. The next season was a poor one as he could not score in twenty-five appearances.

For the 2007–08 season, Gilligan moved into midfield where he has looked to have found his natural position, here he played regularly in the first-team scoring four goals in 28 starts. At the end of the season, he signed a new contract keeping him at Northampton until the end of the 2009–10 season. Things went well for Gilligan in the 2008–09 season even though he only had a return of three goals in 31 games, he was described as an "integral part of the team".

Gillgan was later involved in Northampton Town's relegation to League Two. He then had much more productive season during 2009–10, scoring 11 goals and eight assists from midfield as Northampton narrowly missed a spot in the League Two playoffs, he was made captain for the last five games of the season and signed a new two-year contract in May 2010.

On 10 February 2010, Gilligan was loaned out to Torquay United, on a one-month loan as they chased promotion from League Two. He spent a month at the club, making six appearances and had an impact with back to back wins later leading to Torquay finishing seventh ensuring their place in the League Two Playoffs

Gilligan signed on loan for Newport County on 18 August 2011, with a view to a permanent move. His father also had a brief spell on loan at Newport County. However, Ryan returned to the Northampton after his loan spell was completed.

Upon expiry of his contract at Northampton Town in 2012, Ryan joined Swedish club Östersunds FK, managed by ex English Footballer Graham Potter . Within his first season at the club had their highest ever finish in history as they won promotion to the Superettan. Upon conclusion of the season in December 2012, Ryan extended his stay at ÖFK by signing a 6-month contract extension.

After spending 12 months at ÖFK and upon expiry of his contract, Ryan opted to leave the club signing for Borlänge based club IK Brage for a period of up to 2.5 years. With IK Brage going into administration, Gilligan opted to leave and signed a contract with local rivals Dalkurd FF, this proved to be a very good move. Considered the best central midfielder of the 2014 season Gilligan was crucial in the teams playing style. At the end of the season he decided to move back to the north of Sweden and sign with Umea FC a club that had been keen on Ryan for several years. It also gave him the opportunity to work with Johan Sandhal who Gilligan openly praised on several occasions. he wears the number 10 jersey

On 1 April 2017, Gilligan left PS Kemi, joining TP-47 on 19 April 2017, on a one-year contract with the option of an additional year. In June 2018, he took over some of the coaching responsibilities at the club after they sacked manager Aleksey Zhukov.

== International career ==
Gilligan made two appearances for the England under-16 in 2002 and featured in the Victory Shield.

== Career statistics ==
As of match played 1 November 2015

Appearances and goals by club, season and competition
Club	Season	League			National Cup		League Cup		Other		Total	
Club	Season	Division	Apps	Goals	Apps	Goals	Apps	Goals	Apps	Goals	Apps	Goals
Northampton Town	2005–06	League Two	23	4	0	0	2	0	-		25	4
Northampton Town	2006–07	League One	23	0	1	0	1	0	1	0	26	0
Northampton Town	2007–08	League One	38	4	3	0	1	0	1	0	43	4
Northampton Town	2008–09	League One	31	3	2	0	3	0	0	0	36	3
Northampton Town	2009–10	League Two	42	8	2	1	1	0	3	2	48	11
Northampton Town	2010–11	League Two	22	1	1	0	3	0	0	0	26	1
Northampton Town	2011–12	League Two	2	0	0	0	0	0	0	0	2	0
Northampton Town	Total		181	20	9	1	11	0	5	2	206	23
Torquay United (loan)	2010–11	League Two	5	0	0	0	0	0	0	0	5	0
Newport County (loan)	2011–12	Conference	6	0	0	0	0	0	0	0	6	0
Östersund	2012	Division 1	11	2	0	0	-		-		11	2
Östersund	2012	Superettan	11	1	0	0	-		-		11	1
Östersund	Total		22	3	0	0	-	-	-	-	22	3
Brage	2013	Superettan	5	1	1	0	-		-		6	0
Dalkurd	2014	Division 1	21	0	2	0	-		-		23	0
Umeå	2015	Division 1	22	0	0	0	-		-		0	0
Career total			262	24	12	1	11	0	5	2	290	27
