= Sebastian Harris =

American soccer player

Seb Harris
Personal information
- Full name: Sebastian James Harris
- Date of birth: August 5, 1987 (age 39)
- Place of birth: Rochester, Michigan, U.S.
- Height: 6 ft 3 in (1.91 m)
- Position: Defender

College career
Years	Team	Apps	(Gls)
2006–2009	Oakland Golden Grizzlies	45	(12)

Senior career*
Years	Team	Apps	(Gls)
2009	Michigan Bucks	14	(1)
2009–2011	Northampton Town	13	(1)
2010–2011	→ Stafford Rangers (loan)	5	(0)
2011	→ Nuneaton Town (loan)	11	(1)
2011–2013	Michigan Bucks	29	(2)
2014–2019	Detroit City	130	(13)
Total		202	(18)
- * Club domestic league appearances and goals

Sebastian James Harris (born August 5, 1987) is an American retired soccer player who most recently played for Detroit City FC in the National Premier Soccer League.

== Career ==
=== College and amateur ===
Born in Rochester, Michigan, Harris attended Lake Orion High School in Lake Orion, Michigan, and played college soccer at Oakland University, and impressed scoring 12 goals, including 9 assists in 45 games over a three-year period. He also played with the Michigan Bucks in the USL Premier Development League in 2009, making 14 appearances for the team.

=== Professional ===
Following the conclusion of the 2009 PDL season, Harris travelled to England, and was offered a trial with English League Two side Northampton Town. After scoring two goals in friendlies against Long Buckby and Stamford, Harris joined Northampton on August 3, 2009, on a six-month contract. Harris made his professional debut on November 21, against Crewe Alexandra, coming on as a substitute in the 2–2 draw. Harris was retained at the end of January until the end of the season, and repaid Ian Sampson's faith in him with a late winner against Cheltenham Town on February 27. Harris signed a new contract at the end of the season and was converted by Sampson from a midfielder into a defender for the 2010–11 season. Harris was an unused substitute when Northampton Town defeated Liverpool at Anfield in one of the biggest wins in Cobblers history.

On October 29, 2010, he joined Stafford Rangers on loan until January 2011. After his loan at Stafford expired, he moved to Nuneaton Town on a one-month loan., before being released by Northampton at the end of the season.

Returning to the United States, Harris joined his old club Michigan Bucks in the USL Premier Development League for the 2011 season. He played his first game back with the Bucks on June 10, a 2–1 win over Forest City London.

In 2014, Harris joined Detroit City FC, making 17 appearances in 2014/15 as a defender. After the 2015 season, a supporter podcast for the club named him Detroit City FC's "Breakout Player of the Year."

He went onto become a regular for Detroit for the next five seasons, before he retired in 2019 at the age of 33, after playing over 200 professional games in his career.
