= Courtney Herbert =

English footballer

Personal information
- Date of birth: 25 October 1988 (age 38)
- Place of birth: Northampton, England
- Height: 1.88 m (6 ft 2 in)
- Position: Striker

Team information
- Current team: Northampton Sileby Rangers

Senior career*
Years	Team	Apps	(Gls)
2009	Long Buckby	9	(5)
2009–2011	Northampton Town	34	(2)
2011	→ Cambridge United (loan)	1	(0)
2011–2014	Cogenhoe United		
2014	Corby Town		
2015–2018	AFC Rushden & Diamonds		
2018–	Northampton Sileby Rangers		
- * Club domestic league appearances and goals as of 16:50, 16 May 2025 (UTC)

Courtney Herbert (born 25 October 1988) is an English footballer, who plays for Northampton Sileby Rangers.

== Career ==
Courtney joined Northampton Town from Long Buckby in September 2009, after a successful trial. He scored his first goal on 29 September 2009 against Rotherham United in a 3–1 win. Within four games of his arrival, Herbert was linked with Watford. Herbert scored his second goal against Bury during the 2–2 draw on the October 2009, he ran from the halfway line all the way through the Bury defence to score past goalkeeper Wayne Brown.

He joined Cambridge United on loan on 25 March and made his debut on 2 April as a second-half substitute against Altrincham.
