= David Cardoza =

English football chairman and director

David Cardoza is a former chairman and director of Northampton Town Football Club. In 2005 Cardoza had instigated plans to expand Sixfields Stadium, which will enable the capacity to double. He is the successor to Andrew Ellis and Ken Good as chairman.
