= Paul Rodgers (footballer) =

English footballer

Personal information
- Full name: Paul Leo Henry Rodgers
- Date of birth: 6 October 1989 (age 37)
- Place of birth: Edmonton, London, England
- Height: 6 ft 0 in (1.83 m)
- Position: Defender

Youth career
- 2005–2007: Arsenal

Senior career*
Years	Team	Apps	(Gls)
2007–2009	Arsenal	0	(0)
2009	→ Northampton Town (loan)	11	(0)
2009–2011	Northampton Town	56	(0)
2011–2012	Newport County	37	(0)
2012–2013	Billericay Town	18	(0)
2013	St Neots Town	5	(0)
2013–2014	Billericay Town	18	(0)
2014	Farnborough	9	(0)
2014–2016	Bromley	34	(1)
2016–2017	Bishop's Stortford	37	(0)
2017	Chelmsford City	2	(0)
2017	→ Kingstonian (loan)	15	(1)
2017–2018	Kingstonian	6	(0)
2018–2019	Harlow Town		

International career
2005–2006	England U16	3	(0)
2006–2007	England U17	5	(0)
- * Club domestic league appearances and goals as of 30 April 2018

Paul Leo Henry Rodgers (born 6 October 1989), is an English semi-professional footballer who most recently played for Harlow Town, until the end of the 2018–19 season. Rodgers plays as a defender, either at centre half or full back.

== Career ==
Born in Edmonton, Greater London, Rodgers joined Arsenal in 2005 and was given a professional contract at the start of the 2007–08 season. He originally started out as a full back but has since also played as a centre half and made his Arsenal first-team debut in a friendly against Barnet in the 2007 pre-season.

He made his competitive professional debut in Arsenal's League Cup quarter-final against Burnley on 2 December 2008, a match which Arsenal lost 2–0; Rodgers was substituted for Henri Lansbury after 46 minutes. On 22 January 2009, Arsenal announced he was to go on loan to Northampton Town for one month, which was later extended to the end of the season. Having been released by Arsenal in June 2009, Rodgers signed for Northampton Town after a trial.

Rodgers joined Newport County in 2011. On 12 May 2012 he was an unused substitute for Newport in the FA Trophy Final at Wembley Stadium which Newport lost 2–0 to York City. Rodgers was released by Newport in May 2012 at the end of his contract. Rodgers joined Billericay Town in 2012. In February 2013 he signed for them on contract, after a string of impressive performances.

In June 2013 Rodgers joined St Neots Town who play in the Southern Football League Premier Division. Following the release from the club in September 2013, he re-signed for Billericay Town. On 18 June 2014 he switched to Farnborough, before being sold to Bromley for an undisclosed fee in September 2014. He joined Bishop's Stortford in June 2016. In June 2017, Rodgers signed for Chelmsford City. He joined Kingstonian on loan in August 2017. In November 2017 the switch was made permanent.

== Personal life ==
Rodgers is the cousin of Haringey Borough striker Joe Benjamin. They played together at Northampton Town, St Neots Town, Billericay Town, Farnborough and Bishop's Stortford.
