= Alex Dyer (footballer, born 1990) =

Montserratian footballer (born 1990)

Personal information
- Full name: Alex James Dyer
- Date of birth: 11 June 1990 (age 36)
- Place of birth: Täby, Sweden
- Height: 5 ft 9 in (1.75 m)
- Position: Midfielder

Team information
- Current team: St Albans City
- Number: 5

Youth career
- 2005–2007: Northampton Town

Senior career*
Years	Team	Apps	(Gls)
2007–2010	Northampton Town	34	(3)
2010–2013	Wealdstone	117	(32)
2013	Welling United	20	(4)
2014–2016	Östersund	85	(19)
2017–2019	Elfsborg	39	(4)
2019	→ Lillestrøm (loan)	11	(0)
2020	Al Tadhamon	3	(2)
2020–2025	Wealdstone	156	(4)
2025–	St Albans City	50	(5)

International career^{‡}
2011–	Montserrat	42	(0)

Managerial career
- 2024: Wealdstone (caretaker)
Medal record
Representing Great Britain
football
Universiade
Silver medal – second place	2013 Kazan	Football
- * Club domestic league appearances and goals as of 23:29, 23 September 2026 (UTC) ‡ National team caps and goals as of 14:47, 18 November 2026 (UTC)

Alex James Dyer (born 11 June 1990) is a footballer who plays as a midfielder for Isthmian League Premier Division club St Albans City. Born in Sweden and raised in England, he plays for the Montserrat national team, for whom he holds the record for most international caps.

== Club career ==
Dyer is a product of the Northampton Town's youth system and agreed a professional contract in 2007. In April 2008 he was awarded 'League Two Apprentice of the Month'. He made his debut on 29 August 2007 in a 2–0 League Cup defeat to Middlesbrough at the Riverside Stadium, and scored his first goal in a 2–1 win against Luton Town the same season. He signed a two-year contract extension with Northampton in February 2009. During the 2009–10 season, Dyer was more of a first team player due to Northampton Town being in League Two, playing 20 games and scoring two goals against Notts County and Bradford City. He was released by the club on 12 May 2010 along with five other players, with manager Ian Sampson stating that he had not progressed as he had hoped and that younger players like teammate Michael Jacobs should be given a chance.

Dyer joined Grimsby Town on trial following his release from Northampton, but after playing in one match he was let go having failed to impress the club's management. Subsequently, Dyer went on to sign for Wealdstone in the Isthmian League Premier Division. After 32 goals in 117 games for Wealdstone, he signed for newly promoted Conference National side Welling United, who clinched the Conference South title the previous year.

On 11 December 2013, it was announced that Dyer would be departing Welling United in order to join Swedish tier two side Östersunds FK. He was part of the Östersunds side that won promotion to the top flight in 2015.

On 18 November 2016, Dyer signed for Allsvenskan side IF Elfsborg. On 4 March 2019, he joined Eliteserien side Lillestrøm on loan until 1 August. Dyer left Elfsborg at the end of the 2019 Allsvenskan season.

After a spell in Kuwait playing for Al Tadhamon, Dyer re-joined Wealdstone on a short-term deal on 2 October 2020. He scored his first goal back at the Stones against Wrexham on 17 October 2020, in a 4–3 win. On 26 June 2021, it was announced that Dyer had signed a new one-year contract with the club. In January 2024, Dyer managed one game for Wealdstone following the departure of Stuart Maynard, overseeing a 2–0 victory against FC Halifax Town. After five seasons back at the club, Dyer left Wealdstone at the end of the 2024–25 season having made 299 appearances over two spells.

On 29 June 2025, Dyer signed for Isthmian League Premier Division side St Albans City.

== International career ==
Dyer was called up to the Montserrat national team in 2011, for their 2014 FIFA World Cup CONCACAF first round qualifiers against Belize. He made his debut against Belize on 15 June, in their home fixture, which was played at Ato Boldon Stadium in Couva, Trinidad and Tobago. Montserrat lost 5–2. After making two appearances in June 2021, Dyer reached seventeen caps making him the nation's joint-record appearance holder.
