= Joe Benjamin (footballer) =

English footballer (born 1990)

Personal information
- Full name: Joseph John Benjamin
- Date of birth: 10 October 1990 (age 36)
- Place of birth: Woodford, England
- Height: 5 ft 11 in (1.80 m)
- Position: Striker

Youth career
- West Ham United
- 2006–2008: Northampton Town

Senior career*
| Years | Team | Apps | (Gls) |
| 2008–2010 | Northampton Town | 7 | (0) |
| 2008 | → Brackley Town (loan) | | |
| 2009 | → Eastbourne Borough (loan) | 5 | (0) |
| 2010 | → Eastbourne Borough (loan) | 15 | (1) |
| 2010 | Ebbsfleet United | 5 | (0) |
| 2010 | Boreham Wood | 6 | (1) |
| 2010–2011 | AFC Hornchurch | 5 | (0) |
| 2011 | Wealdstone | 6 | (0) |
| 2011 | Chelmsford City | 13 | (0) |
| 2012 | Tonbridge Angels | 17 | (1) |
| 2012 | Hampton & Richmond Borough | 6 | (0) |
| 2012–2013 | Billericay Town | 12 | (1) |
| 2012 | → Hendon (dual registration) | 0 | (0) |
| 2013 | → Lowestoft Town (dual registration) | 14 | (1) |
| 2013 | St Neots Town | 5 | (0) |
| 2013–2014 | Billericay Town | 25 | (1) |
| 2014 | Grays Athletic | 8 | (0) |
| 2014–2015 | Bury Town | 20 | (0) |
| 2015 | Dulwich Hamlet | 7 | (0) |
| 2015–2016 | Harlow Town | 39 | (1) |
| 2016 | Bishop's Stortford | 3 | (0) |
| 2016–2017 | Harlow Town | 28 | (1) |
| 2017–2018 | Haringey Borough | 9 | (0) |
| 2018 | Northwood | | |
| 2018 | Barking | 1 | (0) |
| 2018 | Great Wakering Rovers | 1 | (0) |
| Total | | 257 | (8) |
- * Club domestic league appearances and goals

Joseph John Benjamin (born 10 October 1990) is an English footballer who last played as a striker for Great Wakering Rovers.

== Career ==
As a boy he was with West Ham United, then came through Northampton Town's Centre of Excellence to make his debut in the Football League on 23 August 2008 as a late substitute in a goalless draw with Millwall. He had a spell on loan to Southern League Premier Division club Brackley Town as work experience in early 2008, and signed an 18-month professional contract with Northampton in January 2009.

In November 2009, Benjamin signed a one-month loan deal with Conference National club Eastbourne Borough. Benjamin played six games for Eastbourne Borough, five of which were in the Conference and one in the Sussex Senior Cup, before being recalled back to Northampton in December. He rejoined the same club on loan for the remainder of the season in January 2010.

He was released by the club on 12 May 2010 along with five other players.

In August 2010, he joined Conference South side Ebbsfleet United. Benjamin left by mutual consent in September 2010 and switched to Boreham Wood, also of the Conference South. He then had a short spell at AFC Hornchurch of Isthmian League Premier Division from November until January, before going on trial with, and later signing for Wealdstone on the turn of the year.

In August 2011 he joined Chelmsford City. He moved on to Tonbridge Angels, also of Conference South, in January 2012.

In May 2012 he penned contract with Carshalton Athletic, but after a dispute with the management he left the club before the season kick-off to sign for Isthmian League Premier Division rivals Hampton & Richmond Borough.

Bejamin moved on to Billericay Town in October 2012. He joined Hendon of the Isthmian League Premier Division on a dual registration basis from Billericay Town the following month, but was never involved in a match. He signed on another dual registration deal in March 2013, with Lowestoft Town. During the spring he made 14 appearances in the league (scoring one goal against Wingate & Finchley) before ending the season featuring in the playoff final on 6 May 2013.

In June 2013, Benjamin joined St Neots Town who play in the Southern Football League Premier Division. Following the release from the club in September 2013, he re-signed for Billericay Town. In June 2014 he departed the club to join Farnborough, but had his contract terminated the following month after a handful of pre-season games, and was then captured by Grays Athletic. They released him in September 2014, and subsequently signed for Bury Town. In March 2015 he was transferred to Dulwich Hamlet. He dropped down to the Isthmian League Division One North to join Harlow Town in July 2015. After starting the 2016–17 season at Bishop's Stortford, he returned to Harlow Town on 18 August 2016. He spent two more seasons with The Hawks, before joining Haringey Borough, whom he helped earn promotion to Isthmian League Premier Division. Further moves include Northwood in March 2018, and Barking ahead of the 2018–19 season. He left Barking in September 2018. On 25 September 2018 he was picked for the Great Wakering Rovers squad that played Canvey Island in the Isthmian League North Division, but was an unused substitute.

== Personal life ==
Benjamin is the cousin of former Arsenal prospect Paul Rodgers. They played together at Northampton Town, St Neots Town, Billericay Town, Farnborough and Bishop's Stortford.

At Bury Town he played alongside another cousin, Chris Benjamin. They were as well together at Haringey Borough and Northwood.
