= JJ Hooper =

English footballer (born 1993)

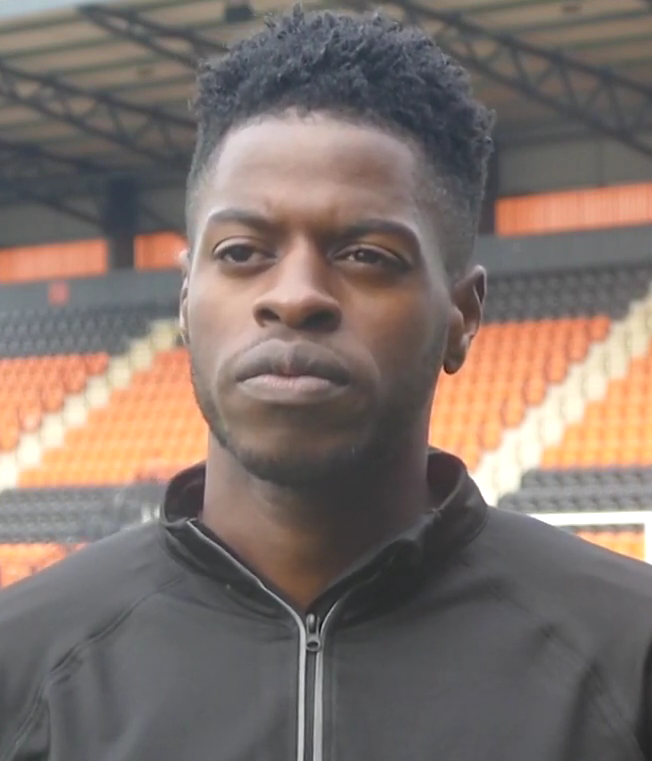
- Hooper in September 2020

Personal information
- Full name: Jonathan James Hooper
- Date of birth: 9 October 1993 (age 33)
- Place of birth: Greenwich, England
- Height: 1.85 m (6 ft 1 in)
- Positions: Forward; winger

Team information
- Current team: Bishop Auckland

Youth career
- 2010–2011: Cray Wanderers
- 2011–2012: Newcastle United

Senior career*
Years	Team	Apps	(Gls)
2012–2013	Newcastle United	0	(0)
2012	→ Darlington 1883 (loan)	0	(0)
2012–2013	→ Workington (loan)	4	(1)
2013–2014	Northampton Town	3	(0)
2013	→ Alfreton Town (loan)	0	(0)
2014	→ Farnborough (loan)	11	(6)
2014–2015	Havant & Waterlooville	37	(13)
2015–2017	Port Vale	51	(10)
2016–2017	→ Northampton Town (loan)	10	(0)
2017–2019	Grimsby Town	46	(7)
2018–2019	→ Bromley (loan)	22	(14)
2019–2020	Wrexham	19	(6)
2020–2021	Barnet	24	(7)
2021–2023	South Shields	21	(12)
2023	Gloucester City	7	(1)
2023–2024	Blyth Spartans	25	(11)
2024	Spennymoor Town	4	(0)
2024–2025	Blyth Spartans	17	(5)
2025	Morpeth Town		
2025–	Bishop Auckland		
2026	→ Morpeth Town (loan)		
- * Club domestic league appearances and goals as of 20:16, 26 April 2026 (UTC)

Jonathan James Hooper (born 9 October 1993) is an English footballer who plays as a forward for Northern League Division One club Bishop Auckland.

Hooper graduated through the Newcastle United Academy and played on loan at Darlington 1883 and Workington. He joined Northampton Town in July 2013 and featured in only five games as he spent time on loan at Alfreton Town and Farnborough. He joined Havant & Waterlooville in June 2014 and had a successful 2014–15 campaign as he helped the club to reach the play-offs. He signed a two-year contract with Port Vale in August 2015 before returning on loan to Northampton Town 12 months later. He signed with Grimsby Town in August 2017 and joined Bromley on loan in December 2018. After scoring 19 goals in 25 matches for Bromley, he was signed to Wrexham in June 2019. He spent the 2020–21 season with Barnet and moved on to South Shields in November 2021. He joined Gloucester City in January 2023 before moving on to Blyth Spartans six months later. He signed with Spennymoor Town in August 2024, and rejoined Blyth Spartans in November. He joined Morpeth Town in September 2025 and moved on to Bishop Auckland three months later.

== Playing career ==
=== Early career ===
Born in Greenwich, Hooper began his footballing career at Cray Wanderers Academy. He made one first-team appearance for Cray in a London Senior Cup tie in February 2011. On 19 August 2011, Hooper signed a two-year scholarship deal with Newcastle United, and scored a hat-trick against Chelsea under-18's the following day. On 14 November 2012, Hooper was loaned to Northern League side Darlington 1883. He made one appearance for Darlington, where he played in the Northern League Cup. A month later, he joined Workington of the Conference North on loan. In February 2013, he was released by Newcastle manager Alan Pardew.

In July 2013, Hooper signed a one-year deal with Northampton Town after impressing on trial. On 3 August, he made his debut in the Football League, replacing Danny Emerton late into a 1–0 defeat to York City at Bootham Crescent. He joined Conference Premier side Alfreton Town on a one-month loan deal on 28 November 2013. He made his debut for Nicky Law's "Reds" in the FA Trophy in a 1–0 defeat to Nuneaton Town at North Street two days later. On 14 March 2014, Hooper joined Conference South side Farnborough on loan until the end of the 2013–14 season. He scored six goals in 11 games which helped the "Yellows" to avoid relegation. He was released by Northampton at the end of the season.

In June 2014, Hooper signed with Lee Bradbury's Conference South side Havant & Waterlooville. The "Hawks" reached the play-offs at the end of the 2014–15 season, losing to Boreham Wood at the semi-final stage. He finished the campaign with 13 goals in 37 league games, and he also scored seven further goals in FA Cup qualifying, Hampshire Senior Cup and Portsmouth Senior Cup games. He was called up to the England C team in May 2015, but did not win a cap.

=== Port Vale ===
Hooper had trials at Scottish sides Dunfermline Athletic, Inverness Caledonian Thistle and Raith Rovers in summer 2015, before playing two friendlies for Cheltenham Town. He impressed enough to win a contract with the club and was photographed with manager Gary Johnson when he was informed of interest from League One club Port Vale; Hooper sneaked out of Whaddon Road to speak with Port Vale shortly before he was due to sign a contract with Cheltenham. The Cheltenham club website initially reported that Hooper had signed a one-year contract. In August 2015, he was revealed as a Port Vale player after signing a two-year contract with the club. The Football Association ruled that Port Vale pay Havant & Waterlooville £8,400 in compensation as the player was under 24. Manager Rob Page gave Hooper substitute appearances of gradually increasing length, and he scored his first goal for the "Valiants" after coming on at half-time in a defeat to Millwall at The Den on 17 January, which was his tenth appearance for the club. He then began starting games; however, lost his first-team place to new signing Theo Robinson in February. On 12 March, he was named as The Sentinel's "star player" after coming off the bench on 66 minutes at Peterborough United to score a goal as Vale turned round a 2–1 deficit to win the game 3–2. After scoring three goals in five games in April, he won the first ever League One PFA Fans' Player of the Month award.

He entered the 2016–17 pre-season in good fitness after having put in extra work with former long jump athlete Matt Burton, alongside Charlton Athletic players Jordan Cousins and Tareiq Holmes-Dennis. However, new manager Bruno Ribeiro began to play him on the right wing rather than at centre-forward, and Hooper returned to former club Northampton Town – now in League One and managed by former Vale boss Rob Page – on a five-month loan on 22 August. He scored his first goal for the "Cobblers" in a 6–0 victory over Harrow Borough in an FA Cup first-round match at Sixfields on 5 November. He made eight starts and five substitute appearances for the "Cobblers", before being ruled out with a thigh injury in November and returning to Vale Park in January when Michael Brown replaced Ribeiro as manager. He was named in the EFL Team of the Week after he played a crucial role in Vale's 3–2 home victory over Swindon Town in a "relegation six-pointer" on 12 March, scoring two goals from left-midfield – including a perfectly placed free kick – and forcing a red card from defender Bradley Barry. He was released by Brown following the club's relegation in May 2017.

=== Grimsby Town ===
On 8 August 2017, Hooper signed a two-year contract with League Two side Grimsby Town on a free transfer, having spent the last few weeks on trial at the club. He scored seven goals in 35 appearances for the "Mariners" throughout the 2017–18 season, including a hat-trick on the final day at Forest Green Rovers on 5 May that earned him a place on the EFL team of the week. He was switched to the left-wing by new manager Michael Jolley, who replaced Russell Slade in March, and Hooper credited this change to his run of form at the end of the campaign.

On 5 December 2018, Hooper joined National League side Bromley on a one-month loan deal after dropping out of the first-team picture at Grimsby. He said that "I live ten minutes away [from Hayes Lane], so it's ideal for me!". The loan was later extended until the end of the 2018–19 season. On 8 December, he made his first start for Bromley in a 2–0 away loss to Gateshead in the National League. On 15 January, he scored a hat-trick in a 3–1 victory over Charlton Athletic in the quarter-finals of the Kent Senior Cup. He ended the campaign as one of the National League's ten highest-scorers on 14 goals despite only being at a mid-table side for the second half of the season. He was released by Grimsby at the end of the 2018–19 season.

=== Wrexham ===
On 18 June 2019, Hooper signed for National League club Wrexham on a one-year deal. Manager Bryan Hughes said Hooper was his "main target" of the summer, and hoped he would provide the goals that the "Reds" lacked in their failed 2018–19 promotion push. He scored on his debut for the "Red Dragons" on 3 August, his headed goal levelled the scores in a 2–1 win over Barrow in the season opener at the Racecourse Ground. However, he picked up a groin injury on 26 August and then went the next two months without a start, before marking his return to the first-team with the only goal of the game in the FA Cup replay with Chesterfield on 22 October. However, he was then sidelined for another two months after picking up an ankle injury four days later. Hooper and the club management were forced to deny rumours that he was refusing to play despite being deemed fully fit. Speaking in January, Hooper said that he appreciated manager Dean Keates's faith in him. He scored seven goals in 22 appearances in the 2019–20 season, which was permanently suspended on 26 March due to the COVID-19 pandemic in England, with Wrexham in 20th-place.

=== Barnet ===
On 11 September 2020, Hooper signed with National League side Barnet. He scored eight goals in 28 games for the "Bees" during the 2020–21 season and was then released upon the expiry of his contract.

=== South Shields ===
Hooper had a trial with Hartlepool United in September 2021. On 5 November, he signed with South Shields of the Northern Premier League Premier Division. Manager Graham Fenton said that "negotiations have taken place over quite a period of time and it's great that JJ has committed his long-term future to the club... we look forward to seeing him score many, many goals for South Shields". He scored four goals in a 4–2 win over Nantwich Town on 26 February. He totalled 12 goals in 21 league games to help Kevin Phillips's "Mariners" qualify for the play-offs at the end of the 2021–22 season. However, they would lose a penalty shoot-out with Warrington Town in the semi-finals.

In November 2022, Hooper was granted permission to speak to multiple clubs about a potential move away. In January 2023, Hooper's contract was terminated by mutual consent after he failed to appear for the club in the first half of the 2022–23 season.

=== Later career ===
On 18 January 2023, Hooper joined National League North club Gloucester City on a deal until the end of the 2022–23 season. He played seven games for the club, scoring one goal.

On 6 July 2023, Hooper joined fellow National League North side Blyth Spartans, re-uniting with former South Shields boss Graham Fenton, whom he cited as a factor in his decision to join the club. He endured injuries in the first half of the 2023–24 season, though was praised by manager Jon Shaw for finding a run of good form around new year. He ended the campaign with 11 goals from 25 league games as Spartans were relegated in 21st place.

On 9 August 2024, Hooper returned to the National League North with Spennymoor Town after impressing Graeme Lee during a trial. He was unable to establish himself in the first team, and had made only four substitute appearances before returning to Blyth Spartans on 14 November for an undisclosed fee. He scored five goals in 17 games in the 2024–25 season, which ended in a second successive relegation. He was released in May 2025.

In September 2025, Hooper joined Northern Premier League Premier Division club Morpeth Town. He moved on to Bishop Auckland of the Northern Premier League Division One East in December 2025 after being offered better financial terms. He rejoined Morpeth Town on loan in February 2026. Both clubs were relegated at the end of the 2025–26 campaign.

== Style of play ==
Primarily a forward, he can also play as a winger. Speaking in December 2015, Port Vale assistant manager Paul Bodin said that Hooper had excellent natural "one-on-one basic technical finishing" skills, but needed further full-time training to improve his other attributes.

== Coaching career ==
In March 2020, he opened Kixx, a football academy in Bromley, alongside teacher Jude Imo-Itah and fellow professional Ade Azeez.

== Career statistics ==
As of match played 12 April 2025

Appearances and goals by club, season and competition
Club	Season	League			FA Cup		League Cup		Other		Total	
Club	Season	Division	Apps	Goals	Apps	Goals	Apps	Goals	Apps	Goals	Apps	Goals
Newcastle United	2012–13	Premier League	0	0	0	0	0	0	0	0	0	0
Darlington 1883 (loan)	2012–13	Northern League	0	0	0	0	—		1 (Note: Appearance in the Northern League Cup)	0	1	0
Workington (loan)	2012–13	Conference North	4	1	0	0	—		0	0	4	1
Northampton Town	2013–14	League Two	3	0	0	0	1	0	1 (Note: Appearance(s) in Football League Trophy / EFL Trophy)	0	5	0
Alfreton Town (loan)	2013–14	Conference Premier	0	0	0	0	—		1 (Note: Appearance(s) in FA Trophy)	0	1	0
Farnborough (loan)	2013–14	Conference South	11	6	0	0	—		0	0	11	6
Havant & Waterlooville	2014–15	Conference South	37	13	3	1	—		2	0	42	14
Port Vale	2015–16	League One	28	5	1	0	0	0	1	0	30	5
Port Vale	2016–17	League One	23	5	0	0	1	0	0	0	24	5
Port Vale	Total		51	10	1	0	1	0	1	0	54	10
Northampton Town (loan)	2016–17	League One	10	0	1	1	0	0	2	0	13	1
Grimsby Town	2017–18	League Two	31	6	0	0	1	0	3	1	35	7
Grimsby Town	2018–19	League Two	15	1	0	0	1	0	3	1	19	2
Grimsby Town	Total		46	7	0	0	2	0	6	2	54	9
Bromley (loan)	2018–19	National League	22	14	0	0	—		3 (Note: Appearances in FA Trophy and Kent Senior Cup)	5	25	19
Wrexham	2019–20	National League	19	6	2	1	—		1	0	22	7
Barnet	2020–21	National League	24	7	3	1	—		1	0	28	8
South Shields	2021–22	Northern Premier League; Premier Division	21	12	0	0	—		1 (Note: Appearance(s) in play-offs)	0	22	12
South Shields	2022–23	Northern Premier League; Premier Division	0	0	0	0	—		0	0	0	0
South Shields	Total		21	12	0	0	0	0	1	0	22	12
Gloucester City	2022–23	National League North	7	1	0	0	—		0	0	7	1
Blyth Spartans	2023–24	National League North	25	11	0	0	—		0	0	25	11
Spennymoor Town	2024–25	National League North	4	0	0	0	—		0	0	4	0
Blyth Spartans	2024–25	Northern Premier League; Premier Division	17	5	0	0	—		0	0	17	5
Career total			301	93	10	4	4	0	20	7	335	104
