= 2012–13 Newcastle United F.C. season =

Newcastle United
2012–13 season
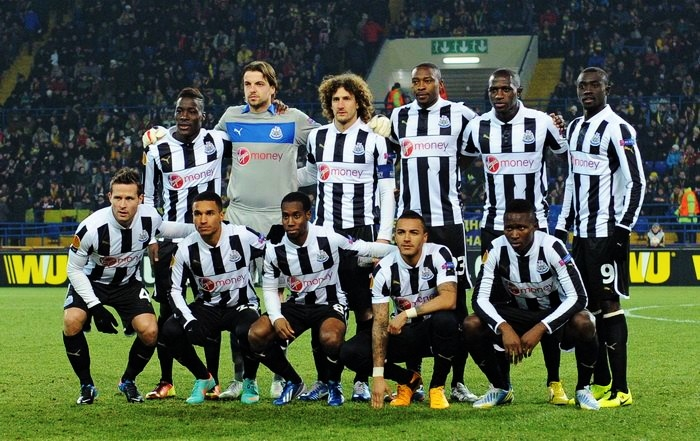
- Newcastle line-up before their UEFA Europa League clash with FC Metalist Kharkiv, February 2013
- Chairman: Derek Llambias
- Manager: Alan Pardew
- Stadium: St James' Park
- Premier League: 16th
- FA Cup: Third round
- League Cup: Third round
- UEFA Europa League: Quarter-finals
- Top goalscorer: League: Demba Ba (13); All: Demba Ba; Papiss Cissé (13)
- Highest home attendance: 52,385 vs. Tottenham Hotspur (18 Aug 2012, Premier League)
- Lowest home attendance: 21,632 vs. Marítimo (22 Nov 2012, Europa League)
- Average home league attendance: 46,898 (in all competitions)
Home colours	Away colours	Third colours

The 2012–13 season was Newcastle United's 120th season of professional football. They competed in the Premier League for the third consecutive season.

== Chronological list of events ==
- 23 May 2012: The club announces the signing of attacking midfielder Romain Amalfitano, who will join the club when his contract at Reims expires at the end of June.
- 1 June 2012: First-team members Alan Smith, Peter Løvenkrands and Danny Guthrie are released by the club. Youngsters Samuel Adjei, Phil Airey, Ryan Donaldson, Stephen Folan, Jeff Henderson, Tamás Kádár, Greg McDermott and Patrick Nzuzi are also released.
- 18 June 2012: Youngster Dan Taylor joins Oldham Athletic on a free transfer after being released by the club.
- 18 June 2012: The 2012–13 Premier League fixtures are released at 9:00 am BST.
- 29 June 2012: Central midfielder Danny Guthrie joins Reading on a three-year contract, after being released by Newcastle a month previously. His contract will become permanent on 1 July. Meanwhile, goalkeeper Fraser Forster signs with Scottish club Celtic for a fee of £2 million.
- 2 July 2012: Striker Leon Best joins Blackburn Rovers for an undisclosed fee, believed to be in the region of £3 million.
- 5 July 2012: The first Premier League TV fixtures (August–November) are announced with ESPN choosing Newcastle's first two games, against Tottenham Hotspur and Chelsea. Sky Sports select Newcastle's trips to Everton, Sunderland and Liverpool with the visit of Manchester United also selected.
- 6 July 2012: The club announces the signing of defensive midfielder Gaël Bigirimana from Coventry City for an undisclosed fee, believed to be in the region of £500,000.
- 13 July 2012: Newcastle's first pre-season game ends in a 1–0 defeat to German club Chemnitzer FC.
- 16 July 2012: Demba Ba scores the only goal in a 1–0 win over AS Monaco.
- 21 July 2012: Mehdi Abeid scores in a 1–1 draw with Fenerbahçe in Austria.
- 27 July 2012: Newcastle's Guadiana Trophy starts with a 1–1 draw with Olympiacos.
- 28 July 2012: Goals from Demba Ba and Ryan Taylor give Newcastle a 2–1 win over Braga and win the Guadiana Trophy for Newcastle.
- 31 July 2012: The club announce the signing of defender Curtis Good from Melbourne Heart on a six-year deal.
- 4 August 2012: ADO Den Haag hold Newcastle to a goalless draw at the Kyocera Stadium. After the match, Alan Pardew complains to the Dutch side about their fans racially abusing Cheick Tioté, Demba Ba and Papiss Cissé.
- 10 August 2012: The Europa League play-off draw is made, pairing Newcastle with Greek side Atromitos.
- 11 August 2012: Newcastle suffer a 4–1 defeat to Cardiff City.
- 16 August 2012: The club and Ajax announce that a price has been agreed for midfielder Vurnon Anita, subject agreeing personal terms and the player passing a medical.
- 18 August 2012: A goal from Demba Ba and a Hatem Ben Arfa penalty help Newcastle beat Tottenham 2–1 in their first Premier League game of the 2012–13 season, despite Pardew being sent to the stands after pushing the fourth official claiming the ball went out of play for a Magpies throw-in.
- 23 August 2012: Ryan Taylor's free-kick earns Newcastle a 1–1 draw against Atromitos in the first leg of their Europa League play-off in Athens.
- 25 August 2012: The Magpies suffer a 2–0 defeat to Chelsea at Stamford Bridge thanks to an Eden Hazard penalty and a Fernando Torres strike both in the first half, but Pardew's side are better in the second half.
- 27 August 2012: The club announce the death of former executive Freddie Fletcher, who worked at St James' Park in the 1990s.
- 30 August 2012: Haris Vučkić scores his first Newcastle goal in a 1–0 win over Atromitos in the Europa League. The win sees Newcastle qualify for the Europa League group stage.
- 31 August 2012: The draw for the Europa League group stage sees Pardew's team placed in Group D with Bordeaux, Club Brugge and Marítimo.
- 2 September 2012: Hatem Ben Arfa's curler gives Newcastle a disappointing draw at home to Aston Villa.
- 17 September 2012: Demba Ba's double (including Newcastle's 1,000th Premier League goal) gives Newcastle a 2–2 draw at Everton.
- 20 September 2012: Newcastle start their Europa League group stage campaign with a goalless draw with Portuguese outfit Marítimo on the island of Madeira, despite both sides having good chances throughout the game.
- 23 September 2012: Demba Ba nets his fourth league goal of the season in a 1–0 home win over Norwich City, despite Papiss Cissé's missed penalty.
- 26 September 2012: Despite a spirited performance, the Magpies go out the Football League Cup at the first hurdle at Old Trafford with substitutes Shane Ferguson and Cissé combining to net Newcastle's consolation goal in a 2–1 defeat, having both came on at the same time.
- 29 September 2012: Ba scores a volley and a controversial goal to earn Newcastle a 2–2 draw at Reading.
- 4 October 2012: Newcastle go top of their Europa League group after thrashing Bordeaux 3–0, with Shola Ameobi and Cissé scoring, whilst Henrique nets an own goal in between.
- 7 October 2012: Having lost 3–0 at St James' Park last season, Manchester United win by the same score on Tyneside, condemning Pardew's team to a first home defeat of the season. After the game, Pardew asks for action against Ba's golden boot rival Robin van Persie for a deliberate foul on Yohan Cabaye.
- 8 October 2012: The Football Association decide not to take any action over the foul on Cabaye by Van Persie.
- 9 October 2012: Short-term loan company Wonga agree a deal to sponsor the Magpies from the 2013–14 season; the deal sees St James' Park renamed having been known as Sports Direct Arena since November 2011.
- 21 October 2012: After Cabaye opens the scoring in the first Tyne-Wear derby of the season, Cheick Tioté is sent off and, despite a man of the match-winning performance from skipper Fabricio Coloccini, a shock Ba own goal means the game finishes 1–1.
- 25 October 2012: Gabriel Obertan's first goal at St James' Park helps Newcastle take a giant step towards the Europa League knock-out rounds with a 1–0 win over Belgian Pro League leaders Club Brugge.
- 28 October 2012: Cissé's goal drought is ended after a 93rd minute shot from Sammy Ameobi is deflected of him and in to the net to give the Magpies victory at home to West Bromwich Albion.
- 4 November 2012: Newcastle earn another excellent 1–1 draw away with ten men and Cabaye opening the scoring, this time at Anfield, where Luis Suárez's excellent goal gives Liverpool a point; Coloccini is sent off.
- 8 November 2012: After going 2–0 down inside 20 minutes away to Club Brugge in Belgium, Vurnon Anita's volley and a Shola Ameobi goal, assisted by brother Sammy, earn the Toon Army a 2–2 draw and the result means they take another step towards qualification.
- 11 November 2012: Former Newcastle captain Kevin Nolan's goal gives West Ham United a shock 1–0 win at St James' Park. Another former player, Rob Elliot, returns from his bike ride across Europe for the Bobby Robson Foundation.
- 17 November 2012: Two errors from goalkeeper Tim Krul gives Swansea City a 2–1 win at St James' Park after another poor performance by the tynesiders.
- 22 November 2012: A 1–1 draw with Marítimo secures Newcastle a place in the knockout phase of the Europa League.
- 25 November 2012: A terrible performance sees Newcastle lose 2–0 at Southampton.
- 28 November 2012: Newcastle lose a 1–0 lead to Stoke City, by whom they were eventually defeated 2–1, the club's fourth consecutive defeat. This is their worst start to a Premier League season since their 2008–09 campaign in which they were ultimately relegated to the Championship.
- 3 December 2012: An awful run of form is ended in a fantastic night at home to Wigan Athletic. A Demba Ba double and Gaël Bigirimana's first goal for the club result in a 3–0 victory against the Lancashire outfit, who had Maynor Figueroa sent off for a foul which resulted in a penalty Ba scored for the first of the night.
- 6 December 2012: Cheick Diabaté's double means Newcastle lose their final Europa League group game and miss out on the chance to finish top of Group D.
- 10 December 2012: Despite Newcastle's improved performances continuing, they lose 2–1 at Fulham.
- 15 December 2012: Alan Pardew's side are left 15th after losing 3–1 at home to Manchester City despite another brave performance.
- 17 December 2012: Pardew cancels Newcastle's Christmas party, claiming the team have not been good enough over the season and calls it a mark of respect to the fans.
- 22 December 2012: Substitute Shola Ameobi scores an 81st-minute winner to give Newcastle a precious win over Queens Park Rangers, taking the Magpies up to 14th in the league table.
- 26 December 2012: Newcastle are so close to giving their fans a Christmas present having taken the lead three times against Manchester United at Old Trafford through James Perch, a Jonny Evans own goal and a Papiss Cissé strike, but they lose 4–3 after Javier Hernández's late winner.
- 29 December 2012: After going behind three times and drawing level every time, a tiring Newcastle are beaten 7–3 at Arsenal thanks to a Theo Walcott hat-trick despite a Demba Ba double and Sylvain Marveaux's first Premier League goal.
- 31 December 2012: Newcastle and French side Lille agree a fee of £5.5 million for defender Mathieu Debuchy, after the 4–3 loss to Manchester United and 7–3 defeat to Arsenal exposed the gaps in the Magpies' defence.
- 2 January 2013: Despite Papiss Cissé opening the scoring in the second minute, Newcastle suffer their ninth defeat in 11 games with a 2–1 loss to Everton, further exposing the gaps in the Magpies' defence.
- 4 January 2013: Demba Ba is signed by Chelsea after the club triggered the £7 million release clause in the striker's contract. Newcastle also officially announce the signing of Debuchy from Lille for a fee of £5.5 million.
- 5 January 2013: A poor performance knocks Alan Pardew's team out the FA Cup at Championship side Brighton & Hove Albion, with Shola Ameobi sent off.
- 12 January 2013: A superb defensive display helps the Newcastle to grab a point at Norwich City in a stalemate.
- 19 January 2013: Defensive normality is resumed at home to struggling Reading as Adam Le Fondre's double gives the Royals their first win on Tyneside after Yohan Cabaye's 35th-minute free-kick. Pardew walks off to a chorus of boos after a poor managerial performance.
- 22–25 January 2013: Newcastle make four more new signings, all from France's Ligue 1. These were French internationals Mapou Yanga-Mbiwa and Moussa Sissoko from Montpellier and Toulouse respectively, as well as Yoan Gouffran from Bordeaux and Massadio Haïdara from Nancy.
- 29 January 2013: A hard-fought 2–1 win against Aston Villa pull Newcastle four points clear of the relegation zone.
- 2 February 2013: The Magpies record their first home win over Chelsea since 2006, with a dominant 3–2 win over the Blues, including two goals from new signing Moussa Sissoko. With the win, Newcastle further extended their distance from the drop zone, sitting six points ahead of 18th placed Wigan.
- 9 February 2013: Newcastle drop back to 16th despite a brave display in a 2–1 loss at Tottenham Hotspur. Yoan Gouffran's first goal for the club sees the visitors level at half-time but a Gareth Bale double results in a 2–1 home win.
- 14 February 2013: Papiss Cissé has two goals controversially ruled out, both for offside, as the Magpies are held to a 0–0 draw at home to Metalist Kharkiv.
- 20 February 2013: The club confirm a French Day for their home match with Southampton after signing five Frenchmen in January (Debuchy, Gouffran, Sissoko, Haïdara and Yanga-Mbiwa) to add to Romain Amalfitano, Sylvain Marveaux, Yohan Cabaye, Hatem Ben Arfa and Gabriel Obertan.
- 21 February 2013: Shola Ameobi scores his 15th European goal from the penalty spot as Newcastle beat Metalist Kharkiv 1–0 for their first European away win since February 2007 to seal a tie with Russian giants Anzhi Makhachkala, but man of the match Tim Krul suffers an injury keeping him out until early April.
- 24 February 2013: On French Day, the Magpies beat Southampton 4–2, taking the club above the Saints and local rivals Sunderland just four weeks after being seven points behind the Black Cats. There are three French speaking players who score — Morgan Schneiderlin to put the visitors in front after just three minutes; Moussa Sissoko with a tap-in to equalize, having been set up by another Frenchman, Yoan Gouffran; and Yohan Cabaye, who netted a penalty to make it 3–2 to Newcastle. Another French-speaking player, Papiss Cissé, scores a wonder strike to make it 2–1 to the hosts. Rickie Lambert netted a tap-in to put Southampton level, but a Jos Hooiveld own goal gives Newcastle a 4–2 lead.
- 1 March 2013: Nile Ranger leaves the club by mutual consent, having had running battles with fans on Twitter and was arrested in January after criticizing fans for booing following the poor performance in the home defeat to Reading.
- 2 March 2013: Newcastle drop back down to 15th after a 1–0 loss at League Cup winners Swansea despite an excellent performance by Steven Taylor and the fact the Magpies were the better team in the second half before Luke Moore's 85th-minute winner.
- 7 March 2013: An excellent defensive display helps Newcastle to become the first team to deny Anzhi Makhachkala victory on home soil in the Europa League.
- 10 March 2013: For the third Premier League home game in a row, the Magpies come from behind to win, this time against Stoke. Jonathan Walters put the Potters 1–0 up from the penalty spot before a Yohan Cabaye free-kick and an injury time volley from Cissé win the game for Newcastle.
- 14 March 2013: In the second leg of the Europa League round of 16 tie with Anzhi, the visitors go down to ten men after Mehdi Carcela's 55th-minute red card. The game looked to be heading into extra time until Cissé's last-second header.
- 15 March 2013: Newcastle are the last team to be drawn out for the Europa League quarter-finals and are paired with unbeaten runaway Portuguese Primeira Liga leaders Benfica
- 17 March 2013: In a controversial encounter at struggling Wigan, the Magpies went behind to Jean Beausejour's first goal for the home side before Callum McManaman's horror challenge on Massadio Haïdara went controversially unpunished, meaning Pardew's number two John Carver and Latics first team coach Graham Barrow both sent to the stands for the second half for a spat. David Santon's first Newcastle goal looked to have saved them a point, but after Cissé's shot was saved by goalkeeper Joel before a goal kick was given, TV replays showed that Maynor Figueroa handled the ball before Arouna Koné's eventual winner.
- 19 March 2013: Steven Taylor earns himself an England call up to replace the injured Gary Cahill, but on the same day the FA decide not to take action against Callum McManaman following his horror challenge on Massadio Haïdara, much to the anger of the Magpies.
- 21 March 2013: Newcastle's longest-serving player, Steve Harper, announces his retirement after 20 years with the Tynesiders
- 30 March 2013: Alan Pardew's injury-hit side are thrashed 4–0 by a brilliant Manchester City side, dropping the Magpies down to 15th.
- 4 April 2013: After Cissé gives the Magpies a priceless lead away to the Primeira Liga unbeaten leaders Benfica in the 1st leg of the Europa League goals from Rodrigo, Lima and Óscar Cardozo kill off a brave Magpies side.
- 7 April 2013: Cissé scores yet another late winner at home to Fulham. The goal saw Alan Pardew do a famous touchline dash, a celebration that Real Madrid manager José Mourinho has done on numerous occasions; Pardew ended up celebrating in the crowd.
- 11 April 2013: Cissé's 71st-minute header gives Newcastle hope of progressing into the Europa League semi-finals against Benfica before Eduardo Salvio's late equalizer sends Pardew's team out of Europe.
- 14 April 2013: Newcastle suffer an embarrassing 3–0 home defeat to local rivals Sunderland in the Tyne–Wear derby, the Black Cats' first win since 19 January. After the match, fans start riots in Newcastle, with 29 people arrested.
- 15 April 2013: The Magpies release a statement saying they were appalled with the riots and will give lifetime bans to fans found guilty.
- 20 April 2013: Newcastle drop down to 16th on goal difference despite an excellent 1–1 draw at West Brom, with Yoan Gouffran's second goal for the club.
- 27 April 2013: The Magpies suffer yet another embarrassing home defeat losing 6–0 to Liverpool despite their star striker Luis Suárez being suspended for the game after another awful display from Pardew's side.
- 1 May 2013: The club release a statement saying they are disappointed about The Sun's untrue article about Hatem Ben Arfa.
- 4 May 2013: Newcastle take another away beat, this time a 0–0 draw at West Ham despite Cissé having a shot which may have gone in cleared off the line by Winston Reid. After the match, Pardew responded to The Sun's article about Ben Arfa.
- 9 May 2013: The Journal report that Steve Harper may have to wait until the following season for his testimonial and they mention it might be against Rangers.
- 10 May 2013: Moussa Sissoko and Shola Ameobi are both ruled out for the rest of the season.
- 12 May 2013: Newcastle's survival is mathematically confirmed with a 2–1 win at already-relegated Queens Park Rangers. Loïc Rémy, who almost moved to the Magpies, opened the scoring from the penalty spot for QPR before Ben Arfa equalized from another penalty. Gouffran then benefited from QPR keeper Robert Green's poor clearance to put the Magpies in front. Rob Elliot's red card late on meant Steve Harper could come on, it also meant he would be able to play his last match against Arsenal.
- 19 May 2013: Newcastle's last match of the season, at home to Arsenal, sees the Gunners win 1–0 through Laurent Koscielny's volley and confirm their Champions League spot for next season. The defeat sees Alan Pardew's team drop to 16th, though they had the consolation of finishing above local rivals Sunderland. In the 37th minute, the fans do a minute's applause for retiring goalkeeper Steve Harper.

== Club ==
=== Team kit ===
Puma supplied the team kits. The new Home kit was debuted on 13 July during a pre-season friendly against German Third Division side Chemnitzer FC, and went on sale on 1 August, as did the third kit. The shirt sponsor was Virgin Money.

=== Coaching staff ===
Position	Staff
Manager	(England) Alan Pardew
Assistant Manager	(England) John Carver
First Team Coach	(England) Steve Stone
Goalkeeping Coach	(England) Andy Woodman
Reserve Team Manager	(Scotland) Willie Donachie
Football Development Manager	(England) Peter Beardsley
Academy Manager	(Scotland) Joe Joyce
Under-18s Coach	(England) Dave Watson
Academy Goalkeeping Coach	(Australia) Chris Terpcou
Chief Scout	(England) Graham Carr

Last updated: 2 June 2012

== Statistics ==
=== Appearances and goals ===
Last updated on 19 May 2013.

No.	Pos	Nat	Player	Total		Premier League		FA Cup		League Cup		Europa League	
No.	Pos	Nat	Player	Apps	Goals	Apps	Goals	Apps	Goals	Apps	Goals	Apps	Goals
1	GK	(Netherlands) NED	Tim Krul	31	0	24	0	0	0	0	0	7	0
2	DF	(Argentina) ARG	Fabricio Coloccini	30	0	22	0	0	0	1	0	5+2	0
3	DF	(Italy) ITA	Davide Santon	38	1	31	1	1	0	0	0	6	0
4	MF	(France) FRA	Yohan Cabaye	35	6	25+1	6	0	0	0	0	7+2	0
5	DF	(England) ENG	Danny Simpson	26	0	18+1	0	0	0	0	0	7	0
6	DF	(England) ENG	Mike Williamson	28	0	19	0	1	0	1	0	7	0
7	MF	(France) FRA	Moussa Sissoko	18	3	12	3	0	0	0	0	6	0
8	MF	(Netherlands) NED	Vurnon Anita	37	1	17+8	0	1	0	0	0	9+2	1
9	FW	(Senegal) SEN	Papiss Cissé	47	13	35+1	8	0	0	0+1	1	9+1	4
10	MF	(France) FRA	Hatem Ben Arfa	22	4	16+3	4	0	0	0	0	2+1	0
11	FW	(France) FRA	Yoan Gouffran	15	3	14+1	3	0	0	0	0	0	0
13	DF	(France) FRA	Mapou Yanga-Mbiwa	20	0	11+3	0	0	0	0	0	6	0
14	DF	(England) ENG	James Perch	38	1	19+8	1	1	0	1	0	8+1	0
15	MF	(England) ENG	Dan Gosling	9	0	0+3	0	0	0	1	0	3+2	0
16	DF	(England) ENG	Ryan Taylor	3	1	0+1	0	0	0	0	0	2	1
17	MF	(France) FRA	Romain Amalfitano	5	0	0	0	0	0	0	0	1+4	0
18	MF	(Argentina) ARG	Jonás Gutiérrez	40	1	34	1	0	0	0	0	3+3	0
19	FW	(Senegal) SEN	Demba Ba	22	13	19+1	13	0	0	0	0	1+1	0
19/35	DF	(France) FRA	Massadio Haïdara	8	0	2+2	0	0	0	0	0	4	0
20	MF	(Burundi) BDI	Gaël Bigirimana	25	1	3+10	1	1	0	0+1	0	8+2	0
21	GK	(Republic of Ireland) IRL	Rob Elliot	17	0	9+1	0	1	0	1	0	5	0
22	MF	(France) FRA	Sylvain Marveaux	36	2	10+12	1	0+1	0	1	0	9+3	1
23	FW	(Nigeria) NGR	Shola Ameobi	35	4	4+19	1	1	0	1	0	5+5	3
24	MF	(Ivory Coast) CIV	Cheick Tioté	31	0	22+2	0	0	0	1	0	5+1	0
25	MF	(France) FRA	Gabriel Obertan	24	1	4+10	0	1	0	1	0	8	1
26	DF	(France) FRA	Mathieu Debuchy	14	0	14	0	0	0	0	0	0	0
27	DF	(England) ENG	Steven Taylor	33	0	24+1	0	0	0	0	0	6+2	0
28	FW	(England) ENG	Sammy Ameobi	14	0	1+7	0	1	0	0	0	4+1	0
29	MF	(Slovenia) SLO	Haris Vučkić	3	1	0	0	0	0	1	0	1+1	1
30	FW	(England) ENG	Nile Ranger	4	0	0+2	0	0+1	0	0	0	1	0
31	MF	(Northern Ireland) NIR	Shane Ferguson	14	0	4+5	0	0	0	0+1	0	3+1	0
34	DF	(England) ENG	James Tavernier	8	0	0+2	0	1	0	1	0	3+1	0
36	DF	(Wales) WAL	Paul Dummett	1	0	0	0	0+1	0	0	0	0	0
37	GK	(England) ENG	Steve Harper	9	0	5+1	0	0	0	0	0	2+1	0
39	MF	(Algeria) ALG	Mehdi Abeid	3	0	0	0	1	0	0	0	1+1	0
49	FW	(England) ENG	Adam Campbell	5	0	0+3	0	0	0	0	0	0+2	0

=== Top scorers ===
Place	Position	Nation	Number	Name	Premier League	FA Cup	League Cup	Europa League	Total
1	FW	(Senegal)	19	Demba Ba	13	0	0	0	13
1	FW	(Senegal)	9	Papiss Cissé	8	0	1	4	13
3	MF	(France)	4	Yohan Cabaye	6	0	0	0	6
4	FW	(Nigeria)	23	Shola Ameobi	1	0	0	3	4
4	MF	(France)	10	Hatem Ben Arfa	4	0	0	0	4
6	MF	(France)	7	Moussa Sissoko	3	0	0	0	3
6	FW	(France)	11	Yoan Gouffran	3	0	0	0	3
8	MF	(France)	22	Sylvain Marveaux	1	0	0	1	2
9	MF	(Netherlands)	8	Vurnon Anita	0	0	0	1	1
9	MF	(Burundi)	20	Gaël Bigirimana	1	0	0	0	1
9	MF	(Argentina)	18	Jonás Gutiérrez	1	0	0	0	1
9	MF	(France)	25	Gabriel Obertan	0	0	0	1	1
9	DF	(England)	14	James Perch	1	0	0	0	1
9	DF	(England)	16	Ryan Taylor	0	0	0	1	1
9	MF	(Slovenia)	29	Haris Vučkić	0	0	0	1	1
#	Own goals				2	0	0	1	3
TOTALS					44	0	1	13	58

=== Cards ===
Accounts for all competitions. Last updated on 19 May 2013.

No.	Pos.	Name	Yellow card	Red card
1	GK	(Netherlands) Tim Krul	1	0
2	DF	(Argentina) Fabricio Coloccini	2	1
3	DF	(Italy) Davide Santon	5	0
4	MF	(France) Yohan Cabaye	11	0
5	DF	(England) Danny Simpson	3	0
6	DF	(England) Mike Williamson	9	0
7	MF	(France) Moussa Sissoko	3	0
8	MF	(Netherlands) Vurnon Anita	4	0
9	FW	(Senegal) Papiss Cissé	8	0
10	MF	(France) Hatem Ben Arfa	1	0
11	FW	(France) Yoan Gouffran	1	0
13	DF	(France) Mapou Yanga-Mbiwa	1	0
14	DF	(England) James Perch	12	0
17	MF	(France) Romain Amalfitano	1	0
18	MF	(Argentina) Jonás Gutiérrez	9	0
19/35	DF	(France) Massadio Haïdara	2	0
20	MF	(Burundi) Gaël Bigirimana	4	0
21	GK	(Republic of Ireland) Rob Elliot	2	1
23	FW	(Nigeria) Shola Ameobi	7	1
24	MF	(Ivory Coast) Cheick Tioté	12	1
26	DF	(France) Mathieu Debuchy	3	1
27	DF	(England) Steven Taylor	2	0
28	FW	(England) Sammy Ameobi	1	0
34	DF	(England) James Tavernier	1	0
39	MF	(Algeria) Mehdi Abeid	1	0

== Players ==
=== First team squad ===
No.	Name	Nationality	Position (s)	Date of birth (age)	Signed from
Goalkeepers
1	Tim Krul	(Netherlands)	GK	3 April 1988 (aged 25)	(Netherlands) ADO Den Haag
21	Rob Elliot	(England) (Republic of Ireland)	GK	30 April 1986 (aged 27)	(England) Charlton Athletic
37	Steve Harper	(England)	GK	14 April 1975 (aged 38)	(England) Seaham Red Star
42	Jak Alnwick	(England)	GK	17 June 1993 (aged 20)	(England) Sunderland Academy
Defenders
2	Fabricio Coloccini	(Argentina)	CB	22 January 1982 (aged 31)	(Spain) Deportivo La Coruña
3	Davide Santon	(Italy)	LB / RB	2 January 1991 (aged 22)	(Italy) Internazionale
5	Danny Simpson	(England)	RB	4 January 1987 (aged 26)	(England) Manchester United
6	Mike Williamson	(England)	CB	8 November 1983 (aged 29)	(England) Portsmouth
13	Mapou Yanga-Mbiwa	(France)	CB	15 May 1989 (aged 24)	(France) Montpellier
14	James Perch	(England)	RB / DM	28 September 1985 (aged 27)	(England) Nottingham Forest
16	Ryan Taylor	(England)	LB / RB / RM	19 August 1984 (aged 28)	(England) Wigan Athletic
19/35	Massadio Haïdara	(France)	LB	2 December 1992 (aged 20)	(France) Nancy
26	Mathieu Debuchy	(France)	RB	28 July 1985 (aged 28)	(France) Lille
27	Steven Taylor	(England)	CB	23 January 1986 (aged 27)	(England) Newcastle United Academy
31	Shane Ferguson	(Northern Ireland)	LB / LW	12 July 1991 (aged 22)	(England) Newcastle United Academy
33	Curtis Good	(Australia)	CB	23 March 1993 (aged 20)	(Australia) Melbourne Heart
34	James Tavernier	(England)	CB / RB	31 October 1991 (aged 21)	(England) Leeds United
36	Paul Dummett	(Wales)	LB / CB	26 September 1991 (aged 21)	(England) Newcastle United Academy
44	Remie Streete	(England)	CB	2 November 1994 (aged 18)	(England) Newcastle United Academy
Midfielders
4	Yohan Cabaye	(France)	CM / AM	14 January 1986 (aged 27)	(France) Lille
7	Moussa Sissoko	(France)	CM / AM	16 August 1989 (aged 24)	(France) Toulouse
8	Vurnon Anita	(Netherlands)	DM	4 April 1989 (aged 24)	(Netherlands) Ajax
10	Hatem Ben Arfa	(France)	AM / RW	7 March 1988 (aged 25)	(France) Marseille
15	Dan Gosling	(England)	CM	1 February 1990 (aged 23)	(England) Everton
17	Romain Amalfitano	(France)	AM / RM	27 August 1989 (aged 23)	(France) Reims
18	Jonás Gutiérrez	(Argentina)	LW / RW	5 July 1983 (aged 30)	(Spain) Mallorca
20	Gaël Bigirimana	(Burundi)	DM	22 October 1993 (aged 19)	(England) Coventry City
22	Sylvain Marveaux	(France)	AM / LW	15 April 1986 (aged 27)	(France) Rennes
24	Cheick Tioté	(Ivory Coast)	DM	21 June 1986 (aged 27)	(Netherlands) Twente
25	Gabriel Obertan	(France)	RW	26 February 1989 (aged 24)	(England) Manchester United
29	Haris Vučkić	(Slovenia)	AM / ST	21 August 1992 (aged 20)	(Slovenia) Domžale
38	Bradden Inman	(Scotland)	CM	10 December 1991 (aged 21)	(England) Newcastle United Academy
41	Conor Newton	(England)	CM	17 October 1991 (aged 21)	(England) Newcastle United Academy
50	Steven Logan	(England)	CM / RB	10 September 1994 (aged 18)	(England) Newcastle United Academy
51	Yven Moyo	(Republic of the Congo)	LM	15 March 1992 (aged 21)	(France) Sochaux
Forwards
9	Papiss Cissé	(Senegal)	ST	3 June 1985 (aged 28)	(Germany) SC Freiburg
11	Yoan Gouffran	(France)	ST	25 May 1986 (aged 27)	(France) Bordeaux
23	Shola Ameobi	(Nigeria)	ST	12 October 1981 (aged 31)	(England) Newcastle United Academy
28	Sammy Ameobi	(England)	ST / LW / RW	1 May 1992 (aged 21)	(England) Newcastle United Academy
49	Adam Campbell	(England)	ST	1 January 1995 (aged 18)	(England) Newcastle United Academy

=== Reserves ===
The following players did not appear for the first team this season.

Note: Flags indicate national team as defined under FIFA eligibility rules; some limited exceptions apply. Players may hold more than one non-FIFA nationality.

No.	Pos.	Nation	Player
30	FW	ENG	Nile Ranger
—	DF	ENG	Michael Riley
—	DF	SUI	Kevin Mbabu
—	DF	SVK	Ľubomír Šatka
—	MF	ENG	Marcus Maddison
—	MF	ENG	Conor Newton

No.	Pos.	Nation	Player
—	MF	ENG	Michael Richardson
—	MF	IRL	Brandon Miele
—	FW	ENG	JJ Hooper
—	FW	ENG	Dennis Knight
—	FW	ESP	Xisco

=== Youth team ===
The following players made most of their appearances for the youth team this season, but may have appeared for the reserves.

Note: Flags indicate national team as defined under FIFA eligibility rules; some limited exceptions apply. Players may hold more than one non-FIFA nationality.

No.	Pos.	Nation	Player
—	GK	ENG	Sam Busby
—	GK	ENG	Aidan Grant
—	GK	ENG	Jonathan Mitchell
—	GK	ENG	Brendan Pearson
—	GK	ENG	Freddie Woodman
—	DF	ENG	Lewis Aird
—	DF	ENG	James Atkinson
—	DF	ENG	Macauley Booth
—	DF	ENG	Jamie Cobain
—	DF	ENG	Macaulay Gillesphey
—	DF	ENG	Brad Halliday
—	DF	ENG	Alex Kitchen
—	DF	ENG	Adam Laidler
—	DF	ENG	Ryan McKinnon
—	DF	ENG	James Morgan
—	DF	ENG	Jamie Sterry
—	DF	ENG	Remie Streete
—	DF	WAL	Alex Nicholson

No.	Pos.	Nation	Player
—	DF	SCO	Kyle Cameron
—	DF	IRL	Lee Desmond
—	MF	ENG	Ben Drennan
—	MF	ENG	Alex Gilliead
—	MF	ENG	Greg Olley
—	MF	ENG	Callum Roberts
—	MF	ENG	Liam Smith
—	MF	ENG	Jordan Storey
—	MF	TUR	Daniel Barlaser
—	MF	COL	Esteban Cardona López
—	MF	JAM	Rolando Aarons
—	FW	ENG	Adam Armstrong
—	FW	ENG	Andy Hall
—	FW	ENG	Tom Heardman
—	FW	ENG	Mechack Kanda
—	FW	ENG	Jonathyn Quinn
—			Ryan Crump
—			Jake Fenton

== Transfers ==
=== In ===
Date	Pos.	Name	From	Fee	Source
1 July 2012	MF	(France) Romain Amalfitano	(France) Reims	Free	
6 July 2012	MF	(Burundi) Gaël Bigirimana	(England) Coventry City	Undisclosed (thought to be £500,000-£1,000,000)	
31 July 2012	DF	(Australia) Curtis Good	(Australia) Melbourne Heart	£500,000	
15 August 2012	MF	(Netherlands) Vurnon Anita	(Netherlands) Ajax	£6,700,000	
4 January 2013	DF	(France) Mathieu Debuchy	(France) Lille	£5.5 million	
22 January 2013	DF	(France) Mapou Yanga-Mbiwa	(France) Montpellier	£6.7 million	
23 January 2013	FW	(France) Yoan Gouffran	(France) Bordeaux	£1.4 million	
24 January 2013	DF	(France) Massadio Haïdara	(France) Nancy	£2 million	
24 January 2013	MF	(France) Moussa Sissoko	(France) Toulouse	£2.1 million	
31 January 2013	DF	(Switzerland) Kevin Mbabu	(Switzerland) Servette	£1 million	

- Total spending: ▼ ~ £25,900,000

=== Out ===
Date	Pos.	Name	To	Fee	Source
1 June 2012	MF	(England) Alan Smith	(England) Milton Keynes Dons	Free	
1 June 2012	FW	(Denmark) Peter Løvenkrands	(England) Birmingham City	Free	
1 June 2012	MF	(England) Danny Guthrie	(England) Reading	Free	
1 June 2012	FW	(Sweden) Samuel Adjei	Free agent	Free	
1 June 2012	FW	(England) Phil Airey	(England) Blyth Spartans	Free	
1 June 2012	MF	(England) Ryan Donaldson	(England) Gateshead	Free	
1 June 2012	DF	(Republic of Ireland) Stephen Folan	(Republic of Ireland) Limerick	Free	
1 June 2012	DF	(Hungary) Tamás Kádár	(Netherlands) Roda JC	Free	
1 June 2012	MF	(England) Greg McDermott	(England) Stockport County	Free	
1 June 2012	DF	(Tanzania) Patrick Nzuzi	Free agent	Free	
1 June 2012	FW	(England) Ryan McGorrigan	(England) Gateshead	Free	
1 June 2012	MF	(England) Daniel Taylor	(England) Oldham Athletic	Free	
1 June 2012	DF	(England) Jeff Henderson	(Republic of Ireland) Sligo Rovers	Free	
1 June 2012	DF	(England) Michael Hoganson	(England) Derby County	Free	
1 June 2012	GK	(Australia) Alex Baird	Free agent	Free	
1 June 2012	FW	(England) Billy Ions	(England) Leeds United	Free	
1 June 2012	MF	(England) Ben Sayer	Free agent	Free	
1 June 2012	DF	(England) Louis Storey	(England) Ashington	Free	
1 June 2012	DF	(Northern Ireland) Lee Toland	(Northern Ireland) Glenavon	Free	
2 July 2012	FW	(Republic of Ireland) Leon Best	(England) Blackburn Rovers	£3,000,000	
5 July 2012	GK	(England) Fraser Forster	(Scotland) Celtic	£2,000,000	
4 January 2013	FW	(Senegal) Demba Ba	(England) Chelsea	£7 million	
31 January 2013	FW	(Spain) Xisco	(Spain) Córdoba	Free	
31 January 2013	MF	(England) Marcus Maddison	(Scotland) St Johnstone	Free	
31 January 2013	DF	(England) Michael Riley	Free agent	Free	
31 January 2013	FW	(England) JJ Hooper	Free agent	Free	
31 January 2013	FW	(England) Dennis Knight	Free agent	Free	
1 March 2013	FW	(England) Nile Ranger	Free agent	Free	

- Total income: ▲ ~ £12,000,000

=== Loans out ===
Date	Pos.	Name	To	Until	Source
31 August 2012	DF	(Wales) Paul Dummett	(Scotland) St Mirren	2 January 2013	
13 November 2012	FW	(England) JJ Hooper	(England) Darlington 1883	7 December 2012	
22 November 2012	MF	(Scotland) Bradden Inman	(England) Crewe Alexandra	End of season	
22 November 2012	DF	(England) Michael Riley	(England) Blyth Spartans	28 January 2013	
22 November 2012	MF	(England) Marcus Maddison	(England) Blyth Spartans	28 January 2013	
22 November 2012	DF	(Australia) Curtis Good	(England) Bradford City	3 March 2013	
7 December 2012	FW	(England) JJ Hooper	(England) Workington	28 January 2013	
1 January 2013	MF	(England) Conor Newton	(Scotland) St Mirren	End of season	
31 January 2013	MF	(Algeria) Mehdi Abeid	(Scotland) St Johnstone	End of season	
31 January 2013	DF	(Wales) Paul Dummett	(Scotland) St Mirren	End of season	
14 February 2013	MF	(England) Michael Richardson	(England) Gillingham	14 March 2013	
25 February 2013	FW	(England) Sammy Ameobi	(England) Middlesbrough	End of season	
28 February 2013	MF	(Northern Ireland) Shane Ferguson	(England) Birmingham City	End of season	

== Competitions ==
Win Draw Loss Void

=== Overall ===
Competition	Started round	Current position / round	Final position / round	First match	Last match
Premier League	—	—	16th	18 August 2012	19 May 2013
League Cup	3rd round	—	3rd round	26 September 2012	26 September 2012
FA Cup	3rd round	—	3rd round	5 January 2013	5 January 2013
UEFA Europa League	Play-off round	—	Quarter finals	23 August 2012	11 April 2013

Updated to match played 19 May 2013
Source: Competitions

=== Pre-season ===
13 July 2012	Chemnitzer FC	1–0	Newcastle United	Chemnitz
17:30 BST	Fink 9'	Report		Stadium: Stadion an der Gellertstraße; Attendance: 6,700; Referee: Alexander Sather (Germany)

16 July 2012	Monaco	0–1	Newcastle United	Landsberg am Lech
18:00 BST		Report	Ba 33'	Stadium: TSV-Stadion; Referee: Peter Sippel (Germany)

21 July 2012	Fenerbahçe	1–1	Newcastle United	Ritzing
18:30 BST	Baroni 90'	Report	Abeid 76'	Stadium: Sonnenseestadion; Referee: Paul Pethö (Austria)

27 July 2012 Guadiana Trophy	Olympiacos	1–1 (4–4 p)	Newcastle United	Faro
20:45 BST	Mitroglou 79'; Modesto (red card) 74'	Report	S. Taylor 25'	Stadium: Estádio Algarve; Referee: João Ferreira (Portugal)
	Penalties
	Abdoun (penalty scored); Maniatis (penalty scored); Pantelić (penalty scored); Holebas (penalty scored); Tatos (penalty missed)		(penalty missed) Cissé; (penalty scored) Vučkić; (penalty scored) Amalfitano; (penalty scored) Perch; (penalty scored) Abeid

28 July 2012 Guadiana Trophy	Braga	1–2	Newcastle United	Faro
20:45 BST	Amorim 68'; Douglão (red card) 83'	Report	Ba 64'; R. Taylor 73'	Stadium: Estádio Algarve; Referee: Paulo Baptista (Portugal)

4 August 2012	ADO Den Haag	0–0	Newcastle United	The Hague
16:00 BST		Report		Stadium: Kyocera Stadion; Attendance: 7,120; Referee: Pieter Vink (Netherlands)

7 August 2012	Hartlepool United	1–5	Newcastle United	Hartlepool
19:30 BST	Sweeney 62'	Report	Sh. Ameobi 3'; Marveaux 4', 12' (pen.); Vučkić 53'; Obertan 85'	Stadium: Victoria Park; Attendance: 4,802; Referee: David Webb

11 August 2012	Cardiff City	4–1	Newcastle United	Cardiff
15:00 BST	Gunnarsson 16', 26'; Ralls 20'; Velikonja 76'	Report	Sh. Ameobi 49' (pen.)	Stadium: Cardiff City Stadium; Attendance: 9,682; Referee: Mark Whitby

=== Guadiana Trophy ===
Team	Pld	W	D	L	GF	GA	GD	Pts
(England) Newcastle United	2	1	1	0	3	2	+1	4
(Greece) Olympiakos	2	0	2	0	2	2	0	2
(Portugal) Braga	2	0	1	1	2	3	−1	1

=== Premier League ===
==== League table ====
Pos	Team	Pld	W	D	L	GF	GA	GD	Pts	Qualification or relegation
14	Southampton	38	9	14	15	49	60	−11	41	
15	Aston Villa	38	10	11	17	47	69	−22	41	
16	Newcastle United	38	11	8	19	45	68	−23	41	
17	Sunderland	38	9	12	17	41	54	−13	39	
18	Wigan Athletic (R)	38	9	9	20	47	73	−26	36	Qualification for the Europa League group stage and relegation to Football League Championship (Note: Wigan Athletic qualified for the Europa League group stage as the 2012–13 FA Cup winners.)

Source: Barclays Premier League
Rules for classification: 1) Points; 2) Goal difference; 3) Goals scored; 4) Play-offs (only if needed to decide champion, teams for relegation or teams for UEFA competitions).
(R) Relegated

==== Results summary ====
Overall								Home						Away					
Pld	W	D	L	GF	GA	GD	Pts	W	D	L	GF	GA	GD	W	D	L	GF	GA	GD
38	11	8	19	45	68	−23	41	9	1	9	24	31	−7	2	7	10	21	37	−16

Last updated: 19 May 2013.
Source: Premier League

==== Results by round ====
Round	1	2	3	4	5	6	7	8	9	10	11	12	13	14	15	16	17	18	19	20	21	22	23	24	25	26	27	28	29	30	31	32	33	34	35	36	37	38
Ground	H	A	H	A	H	A	H	A	H	A	H	H	A	A	H	A	H	H	A	A	H	A	H	A	H	A	H	A	H	A	A	H	H	A	H	A	A	H
Result	W	L	D	D	W	D	L	D	W	D	L	L	L	L	W	L	L	W	L	L	L	D	L	W	W	L	W	L	W	L	L	W	L	D	L	D	W	L
Position	4	9	10	11	9	9	10	11	10	10	10	12	14	14	14	14	15	14	15	15	15	16	16	15	15	15	14	15	13	13	15	13	13	16	16	16	13	16

Source: Fixtures and Results
A = Away; H = Home; W = Win; D = Draw; L = Loss

==== Premier League ====
18 August 2012 1	Newcastle United	2–1	Tottenham Hotspur	Newcastle upon Tyne
17:30 BST	Ba 54'; Ben Arfa 80' (pen.)	Report	Defoe 76'	Stadium: St James' Park; Attendance: 52,385; Referee: Martin Atkinson

25 August 2012 2	Chelsea	2–0	Newcastle United	London
17:30 BST	Hazard 22' (pen.); Torres (yellow card) 39', (goal) 45+3'	Report		Stadium: Stamford Bridge; Attendance: 41,718; Referee: Phil Dowd

2 September 2012 3	Newcastle United	1–1	Aston Villa	Newcastle upon Tyne
16:00 BST	Ben Arfa 59'	Report	Clark 22'; El Ahmadi (yellow card) 27'; Gutiérrez (yellow card) 85'; Lichaj (yellow card) 90'	Stadium: St James' Park; Attendance: 48,245; Referee: Lee Probert

17 September 2012 4	Everton	2–2	Newcastle United	Liverpool
20:00 BST	Neville (yellow card) 6'; Baines 15'; Pienaar (yellow card) 78'; Fellaini (yellow card) 84'; Anichebe 88'	Report	Anita (yellow card) 29'; Perch (yellow card) 37'; Ba 49', 90'; Sh. Ameobi (yellow card) 85'	Stadium: Goodison Park; Attendance: 32,510; Referee: Mike Jones

23 September 2012 5	Newcastle United	1–0	Norwich City	Newcastle upon Tyne
15:00 BST	Ba 19'; Cissé (penalty missed) 45'; Tioté (yellow card) 89'	Report	Howson (yellow card) 88'	Stadium: St James' Park; Attendance: 49,402; Referee: Neil Swarbrick

29 September 2012 6	Reading	2–2	Newcastle United	Reading
15:00 BST	Kébé 58'; Hunt 62'	Report	Ba 58', 83'	Stadium: Madejski Stadium; Attendance: 24,097; Referee: Andre Marriner

7 October 2012 7	Newcastle United	0–3	Manchester United	Newcastle upon Tyne
16:00 BST		Report	Evans 8'; Evra 15'; Cleverley 71'	Stadium: St James' Park; Attendance: 52,203; Referee: Howard Webb

21 October 2012 8	Sunderland	1–1	Newcastle United	Sunderland
13:30 BST	Ba 86' (o.g.)	Report	Cabaye 3', (yellow card) 86'; Tioté (red card) 25'; Coloccini (yellow card) 68'; Williamson (yellow card) 84'	Stadium: Stadium of Light; Attendance: 47,456; Referee: Martin Atkinson

28 October 2012 9	Newcastle United	2–1	West Bromwich Albion	Newcastle upon Tyne
15:00 GMT	Ba 35'; Cissé 90+3'	Report	Lukaku 55'	Stadium: St James' Park; Attendance: 49,731; Referee: Chris Foy

4 November 2012 10	Liverpool	1–1	Newcastle United	Liverpool
16:00 GMT	Suárez 67'	Report	Cabaye 43'; Coloccini (red card) 84'; Santon (yellow card) 90+4'	Stadium: Anfield; Attendance: 44,803; Referee: Anthony Taylor

11 November 2012 11	Newcastle United	0–1	West Ham United	Newcastle upon Tyne
15:00 GMT	Ben Arfa (yellow card) 76'	Report	Nolan 38'; Noble (yellow card) 45'; O'Brien (yellow card) 61'	Stadium: St James' Park; Attendance: 51,855; Referee: Mike Dean

17 November 2012 12	Newcastle United	1–2	Swansea City	Newcastle upon Tyne
15:00 GMT	Ba 90+3'	Report	Michu 58'; De Guzmán 87'	Stadium: St James' Park; Attendance: 49,403; Referee: Phil Dowd

25 November 2012 13	Southampton	2–0	Newcastle United	Southampton
15:00 GMT	Fonte (yellow card) 22'; Lallana 35'; Ramírez 60', (yellow card) 70'	Report	Williamson (yellow card) 43'; Tioté (yellow card) 86'	Stadium: St Mary's Stadium; Attendance: 31,410; Referee: Martin Atkinson

28 November 2012 14	Stoke City	2–1	Newcastle United	Stoke-on-Trent
19:45 GMT	Walters 81'; Jerome 85'	Report	Cissé 47'	Stadium: Britannia Stadium; Attendance: 26,793; Referee: Howard Webb

3 December 2012 15	Newcastle United	3–0	Wigan Athletic	Newcastle upon Tyne
20:00 GMT	Ba 13' (pen.), 21'; Bigirimana 71'	Report	Figueroa (red card) 12'	Stadium: St James' Park; Attendance: 43,858; Referee: Mike Jones

10 December 2012 16	Fulham	2–1	Newcastle United	Fulham
20:00 GMT	Sidwell 19'; Rodallega 63'	Report	Ben Arfa 54'	Stadium: Craven Cottage; Attendance: 25,270; Referee: Lee Mason

15 December 2012 17	Newcastle United	1–3	Manchester City	Newcastle upon Tyne
12:45 GMT	Ba 51'	Report	Agüero 10'; García 39'; Y. Touré 78'	Stadium: St James' Park; Attendance: 49,579; Referee: Andre Marriner

22 December 2012 18	Newcastle United	1–0	Queens Park Rangers	Newcastle upon Tyne
15:00 GMT	Sh. Ameobi 81'	Report		Stadium: St James' Park; Attendance: 50,180; Referee: Kevin Friend

26 December 2012 19	Manchester United	4–3	Newcastle United	Manchester
15:00 GMT	Evans 25'; Evra 58'; Van Persie 71'; Hernández 90'	Report	Perch 4'; Evans 28' (o.g.); Cissé 68'	Stadium: Old Trafford; Attendance: 75,596; Referee: Mike Dean

29 December 2012 20	Arsenal	7–3	Newcastle United	London
17:30 GMT	Walcott 20', 73', 90+2'; Oxlade-Chamberlain 50'; Podolski 64'; Giroud 84', 87'	Report	Ba 43', 69'; Marveaux 59'	Stadium: Emirates Stadium; Attendance: 60,087; Referee: Chris Foy

2 January 2013 21	Newcastle United	1–2	Everton	Newcastle upon Tyne
20:00 GMT	Cissé 2', (yellow card) 41'; Williamson (yellow card) 53'; Tioté (yellow card) 68'	Report	Baines 43'; Heitinga (yellow card) 47'; Anichebe 60'; Pienaar (yellow card) 80'	Stadium: St James' Park; Attendance: 49,391; Referee: Martin Atkinson

12 January 2013 22	Norwich City	0–0	Newcastle United	Norwich
15:00 GMT		Report	Debuchy (yellow card) 84'	Stadium: Carrow Road; Attendance: 26,752; Referee: Anthony Taylor

19 January 2013 23	Newcastle United	1–2	Reading	Newcastle upon Tyne
15:00 GMT	Cabaye 35'	Report	Le Fondre 71', 77'	Stadium: St James' Park; Attendance: 49,411; Referee: Andre Marriner

29 January 2013 24	Aston Villa	1–2	Newcastle United	Birmingham
19:45 GMT	N'Zogbia (yellow card) 42'; Benteke 49' (pen.), (yellow card) 61'; Baker (yellow card) 67'; Lowton (yellow card) 76'; Agbonlahor (yellow card) 78'	Report	Cissé 19'; Cabaye 31'; Gutiérrez (yellow card) 52'; Sh. Ameobi (yellow card) 87'	Stadium: Villa Park; Attendance: 30,334; Referee: Mike Dean

2 February 2013 25	Newcastle United	3–2	Chelsea	Newcastle upon Tyne
15:00 GMT	Gutiérrez 41'; Sissoko 68', 90'	Report	Lampard 55'; Mata 61'	Stadium: St James' Park; Attendance: 52,314; Referee: Howard Webb

9 February 2013 26	Tottenham Hotspur	2–1	Newcastle United	London
12:45 GMT	Bale 5', 78'	Report	Gouffran 24'	Stadium: White Hart Lane; Attendance: 36,244; Referee: Phil Dowd

24 February 2013 27	Newcastle United	4–2	Southampton	Newcastle upon Tyne
13:30 GMT	Sissoko 33'; Cissé 42'; Cabaye 67' (pen.); Hooiveld 79' (o.g.)	Report	Schneiderlin 3'; Lambert 50'	Stadium: St James' Park; Attendance: 52,259; Referee: Chris Foy

2 March 2013 28	Swansea City	1–0	Newcastle United	Swansea
15:00 GMT	Moore 85'	Report		Stadium: Liberty Stadium; Attendance: 20,405; Referee: Craig Pawson

10 March 2013 29	Newcastle United	2–1	Stoke City	Newcastle upon Tyne
15:00 GMT	Cabaye 73'; Cissé 90+2'	Report	Walters 67' (pen.)	Stadium: St James' Park; Attendance: 50,703; Referee: Andre Marriner

17 March 2013 30	Wigan Athletic	2–1	Newcastle United	Wigan
16:00 GMT	Beausejour 18'; Koné 90'	Report	Santon 72'	Stadium: DW Stadium; Attendance: 22,297; Referee: Mark Halsey

30 March 2013 31	Manchester City	4–0	Newcastle United	Manchester
15:00 GMT	Tevez 41'; Silva 45'; Kompany 56'; Y. Touré 69'	Report		Stadium: City of Manchester Stadium; Attendance: 47,201; Referee: Neil Swarbrick

7 April 2013 32	Newcastle United	1–0	Fulham	Newcastle upon Tyne
15:00 BST	Cissé 90+2'	Report		Stadium: St James' Park; Attendance: 51,847; Referee: Kevin Friend

14 April 2013 33	Newcastle United	0–3	Sunderland	Newcastle upon Tyne
12:00 BST		Report	Sessègnon 27'; Johnson 74'; Vaughan 82'	Stadium: St James' Park; Attendance: 52,355; Referee: Howard Webb

20 April 2013 34	West Bromwich Albion	1–1	Newcastle United	West Bromwich
15:00 BST	Jones 64'	Report	Gouffran 8'	Stadium: The Hawthorns; Attendance: 25,671; Referee: Mike Jones

27 April 2013 35	Newcastle United	0–6	Liverpool	Newcastle upon Tyne
17:30 BST	Debuchy (red card) 75'	Report	Agger 3'; Henderson 17', 76'; Sturridge 54', 60'; Borini 74'	Stadium: St James' Park; Attendance: 52,351; Referee: Andre Marriner

4 May 2013 36	West Ham United	0–0	Newcastle United	London
15:00 BST	O'Brien (yellow card) 9'	Report	Coloccini (yellow card) 78'; Tioté (yellow card) 88'	Stadium: Boleyn Ground; Attendance: 34,962; Referee: Phil Dowd

12 May 2013 37	Queens Park Rangers	1–2	Newcastle United	London
15:00 BST	Rémy 11' (pen.)	Report	Ben Arfa 18' (pen.); Gouffran 35'	Stadium: Loftus Road; Attendance: 17,278; Referee: Lee Probert

19 May 2013 38	Newcastle United	0–1	Arsenal	Newcastle upon Tyne
16:00 BST		Report	Koscielny 52'	Stadium: St James' Park; Attendance: 52,354; Referee: Howard Webb

=== FA Cup ===
5 January 2013 Third round	Brighton & Hove Albion	2–0	Newcastle United	Falmer
15:00 GMT	Orlandi 33'; Hoskins 87'	Report		Stadium: Falmer Stadium; Attendance: 21,740; Referee: Lee Probert

=== Football League Cup ===
26 September 2012 Third round	Manchester United	2–1	Newcastle United	Manchester
19:45 BST	Anderson 44'; Cleverley 58'	Report	Cissé 62'	Stadium: Old Trafford; Attendance: 46,358; Referee: Anthony Taylor

=== UEFA Europa League ===
==== Play-off round ====
23 August 2012 First leg	Atromitos (Greece)	1–1	(England) Newcastle United	Athens, Greece
18:00 BST	Epstein 24'	Report	R. Taylor 45+2'	Stadium: Peristeri Stadium; Attendance: 4,872; Referee: Alon Yefet (Israel)

30 August 2012 Second leg	Newcastle United (England)	1–0 (2–1 agg.)	(Greece) Atromitos	Newcastle upon Tyne, England
20:00 BST	Vučkić 21'	Report		Stadium: St James' Park; Attendance: 29,242; Referee: Stephan Studer (Switzerland)

==== Group stage ====
Pos	Team	Pld	W	D	L	GF	GA	GD	Pts	Qualification
1	(France) Bordeaux	6	4	1	1	10	5	+5	13	Advance to knockout phase
2	(England) Newcastle United	6	2	3	1	7	5	+2	9	Advance to knockout phase
3	(Portugal) Marítimo	6	1	3	2	4	6	−2	6	
4	(Belgium) Club Brugge	6	1	1	4	6	11	−5	4	

Source: Soccerway

20 September 2012 1	Marítimo (Portugal)	0–0	(England) Newcastle United	Funchal, Portugal
18:00 BST		Report		Stadium: Estádio dos Barreiros; Attendance: 4,000; Referee: Robert Schörgenhofer (Austria)

4 October 2012 2	Newcastle United (England)	3–0	(France) Bordeaux	Newcastle upon Tyne, England
20:05 BST	Sh. Ameobi 16'; Henrique 40' (o.g.); Cissé 49'	Report		Stadium: St James' Park; Attendance: 30,987; Referee: Antonio Mateu Lahoz (Spain)

25 October 2012 3	Newcastle United (England)	1–0	(Belgium) Club Brugge	Newcastle upon Tyne, England
20:05 BST	Obertan 48'	Report		Stadium: St James' Park; Attendance: 33,124; Referee: Martin Hansson (Sweden)

8 November 2012 4	Club Brugge (Belgium)	2–2	(England) Newcastle United	Bruges, Belgium
18:00 GMT	Tričkovski 14'; Jørgensen 19'	Report	Anita 41'; Sh. Ameobi 43'	Stadium: Jan Breydel Stadium; Attendance: 18,000; Referee: Luca Banti (Italy)

22 November 2012 5	Newcastle United (England)	1–1	(Portugal) Marítimo	Newcastle upon Tyne, England
20:05 GMT	Marveaux 23'	Report	Fidélis 79'	Stadium: St James' Park; Attendance: 21,632; Referee: Danny Makkelie (Netherlands)

6 December 2012 6	Bordeaux (France)	2–0	(England) Newcastle United	Bordeaux, France
18:00 GMT	Diabaté 29', 72'	Report		Stadium: Stade Chaban-Delmas; Attendance: 20,000; Referee: Menashe Masiah (Israel)

==== Round of 32 ====
14 February 2013 First leg	Newcastle United (England)	0–0	(Ukraine) Metalist Kharkiv	Newcastle upon Tyne, England
20:05 GMT		Report		Stadium: St James' Park; Attendance: 30,157; Referee: Tom Harald Hagen (Norway)

21 February 2013 Second leg	Metalist Kharkiv (Ukraine)	0–1 (0–1 agg.)	(England) Newcastle United	Kharkiv, Ukraine
18:00 GMT		Report	Sh. Ameobi 64' (pen.)	Stadium: Metalist Oblast Sports Complex; Attendance: 39,973; Referee: Serge Gumienny (Belgium)

==== Round of 16 ====
7 March 2013 First leg	Anzhi Makhachkala (Russia)	0–0	(England) Newcastle United	Moscow, Russia
17:00 GMT		Report		Stadium: Luzhniki Stadium; Attendance: 5,000; Referee: István Vad (Hungary)

14 March 2013 Second leg	Newcastle United (England)	1–0 (1–0 agg.)	(Russia) Anzhi Makhachkala	Newcastle upon Tyne, England
20:05 GMT	Cissé 90+4'	Report		Stadium: St James' Park; Attendance: 45,487; Referee: Deniz Aytekin (Turkey)

==== Quarter-finals ====
4 April 2013 First leg	Benfica (Portugal)	3–1	(England) Newcastle United	Lisbon, Portugal
20:05 GMT	Rodrigo 25'; Lima 65'; Cardozo 71' (pen.)	Report	Cissé 12'	Stadium: Estádio da Luz; Attendance: 44,133; Referee: Anthony Gautier (France)

11 April 2013 Second leg	Newcastle United (England)	1–1 (2–4 agg.)	(Portugal) Benfica	Newcastle upon Tyne, England
20:05 GMT	Cissé 71'	Report	Salvio 90+2'	Stadium: St James' Park; Attendance: 52,157; Referee: Ivan Bebek (Croatia)
