= Claudio Dias =

English footballer

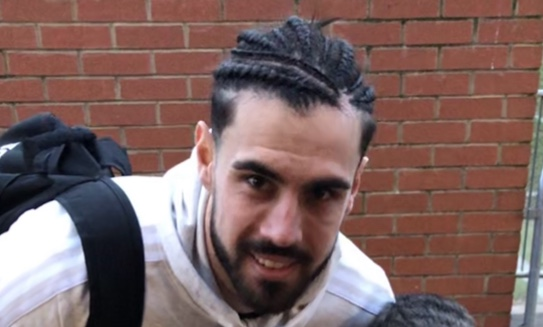
- Dias with Tamworth in 2019

Personal information
- Full name: Claudio Franca Dias
- Date of birth: 10 November 1994 (age 31)
- Place of birth: Milton Keynes, England
- Height: 5 ft 10 in (1.78 m)
- Position: Midfielder

Team information
- Current team: St Neots Town

Youth career
- –2013: Northampton Town

Senior career*
Years	Team	Apps	(Gls)
2013–2014	Northampton Town	1	(0)
2013	→ Corby Town (loan)	4	(0)
2013–2014	→ Banbury United (loan)	3	(3)
2014	→ Banbury United (loan)	12	(1)
2014	Dunstable Town	1	(0)
2014–2015	Bedford Town	3	(0)
2015–2016	Barton Rovers	12	(2)
2016	Brackley Town	1	(0)
2016–2017	Braintree Town	2	(0)
2017	Dunstable Town	6	(1)
2017–2018	Barton Rovers		
2018	Potton United	10	(3)
2018–2019	Stratford Town	14	(1)
2019	Tamworth	13	(0)
2019–2020	Banbury United	24	(1)
2020–2021	Nuneaton Borough	5	(0)
2021	AFC Rushden & Diamonds	6	(0)
2021–2024	Alvechurch	17	(3)
2023–2024	→ Rugby Town (dual-registration)	3	(0)
2024	Leighton Town	2	(1)
2024	Walsall Wood	8	(1)
2024–2025	Banbury United	20	(1)
2025	St Ives Town	5	(0)
2025	Rugby Borough		
2025	St Neots Town		
2025-26	Northampton Sileby Rangers		
- * Club domestic league appearances and goals as of 10:00, 22 October 2026 (UTC)

Claudio Franca Dias (born 10 November 1994) is an English semi-professional footballer who plays as a midfielder for United Counties League Premier Division South club St Neots Town.

== Career ==
=== Northampton Town ===
Born in Milton Keynes, Buckinghamshire, Dias joined Northampton Town at under-14 level and progressed through the club's youth system, before signing his first professional contract along with David Moyo on 4 March 2013. He made his professional debut for the club as a 76th-minute substitute for Luke Guttridge in a 2–0 win at home to Barnet on the final day of the 2012–13 season. During the early months of the 2013–14 season, Dias was an unused substitute on six occasions, but failed to make an appearance. He was subsequently released at the end of the season.

On 30 August 2013, Dias joined Southern League Premier Division club Corby Town on a one-month loan. He made his debut for the club a day later as a first half substitute for Tom James in a 1–0 away defeat to St Albans City. He made three further league appearances during his loan spell.

On 13 December 2013, Dias joined Southern League Premier Division club Banbury United on a one-month loan. He made his debut for the club as a 66th-minute substitute in a 4–2 away defeat to former club Corby Town five days later. In Banbury's next match away to Hemel Hempstead Town, Dias came on as a half-time substitute, before scoring a second half hat-trick in a 5–3 defeat. His loan spell concluded having made three league appearances for the club.

On 7 March 2014, Dias rejoined Banbury United on loan until the end of the 2013–14 season. He made a further 12 league appearances, including one goal in a 6–4 win at home to Biggleswade Town on 8 April 2014 to ensure Banbury's survival in the Southern League Premier Division.

=== Non-League ===
Following his release by Northampton Town, Dias began training with newly promoted Southern League Premier Division club Dunstable Town, for whom he made one appearance as a 63rd-minute substitute in a 2–1 away win at Bideford on the opening day of the 2014–15 season. Thereafter, Dias signed for Southern League Division One Central club Bedford Town on an undisclosed length contract. He made his debut for the club as a second-half substitute in a 4–0 away defeat to Marlow on 25 October 2014. Dias scored his first goal for the club two minutes after coming on as an 86th-minute substitute in a 4–0 win at home to Brightlingsea Regent in the FA Trophy first qualifying round one week later. However, after making his third appearance for Bedford, Dias was ruled out through injury, before returning in a 3–3 draw with Godalming Town as a 67th-minute substitute on 16 December 2014, his final appearance for the club.

Dias moved to Southern League Division One Central club Barton Rovers shortly before the start of the 2015–16 season and made his debut for the club as a substitute in the FA Cup preliminary round, a 3–1 win at home to Berkhamsted on 29 August 2015. He scored his first goal for the club, a 49th-minute equaliser from 30-yards in a 2–2 draw with Northwood one week later. Dias later scored the final goal in a 3–1 win at home North Greenford United on 21 November 2015 to help Barton end a run of four consecutive league defeats. He went on to make a total of 18 appearances in all competitions and scored three goals.

Dias moved up two divisions after he was signed by new Brackley Town manager Kevin Wilkin in the build-up to the 2016–17 season as part of a reshape of the squad. He came on as an 87th-minute substitute for Shane Byrne to make his debut appearance for Brackley in a 4–2 away win at Stockport County. His second and final appearance was in the FA Cup fourth qualifying round when he came off the bench as an 87th-minute substitute to score a stoppage time goal in a 5–0 away win at Beaconsfield SYCOB to help Brackley earn a first round match away to Gillingham.

Dias moved up another division to sign for National League club Braintree Town on 21 October 2016.

He re-signed for Barton Rovers ahead of 2017–18 following a second spell with Dunstable Town. Dias signed for United Counties League Division One club Potton United on 19 February 2018. He made his debut five days later, starting in a 3–0 away win over Burton Park Wanderers. Dias scored his first two goals in a 3–1 away victory over Harrowby United on 17 March.

Dias signed for Southern League Premier Division Central club Stratford Town on 4 July 2018. He left the club on 10 January 2019, having made 21 appearances and scored one goal. A day later, he joined Stratford's divisional rivals Tamworth and made his debut against his previous club as a 68th-minute substitute in a 1–0 home defeat the following day.

On 5 June 2019, Dias rejoined Banbury United on a one-year contract. He made 34 appearances and scored one goal in all competitions before the 2019–20 season was abandoned and results expunged because of the COVID-19 pandemic in England.

Dias signed for another Southern League Premier Division Central club, Nuneaton Borough, on 15 June 2020. He only played five games for the club before the season was again curtailed due to COVID-19 and subsequently signed for fellow Southern Premier League Central club AFC Rushden & Diamonds in August 2021. Two months later he was on the move when he transferred to divisional rivals Alverchurch on 24 October, making his bow in a 2–1 win over Barwell.

In November 2023, he joined Rugby Town on a dual-registration basis.

In July 2024, Dias joined Banbury United, a fourth spell with the club having finished the previous season with Walsall Wood.

Dias was confirmed as signing for Northern Premier League Division One Midlands side Rugby Borough on 26 July 2025.

Claudio moved to Northern Premier League Division One Midlands side St Neots Town on 23 December 2025.

== Career statistics ==
As of match played end of 2024–25 season

Appearances and goals by club, season and competition
Club	Season	League			FA Cup		League Cup		Other		Total	
Club	Season	Division	Apps	Goals	Apps	Goals	Apps	Goals	Apps	Goals	Apps	Goals
Northampton Town	2012–13	League Two	1	0	0	0	0	0	0	0	1	0
Northampton Town	2013–14	League Two	0	0	0	0	0	0	0	0	0	0
Northampton Town	Total		1	0	0	0	0	0	0	0	1	0
Corby Town (loan)	2013–14	Southern League Premier Division	4	0	—		—		—		4	0
Banbury United (loan)	2013–14	Southern League Premier Division	15	4	—		—		—		15	4
Dunstable Town	2014–15	Southern League Premier Division	1	0	0	0	—		—		1	0
Bedford Town	2014–15	Southern League Division One Central	3	0	—		—		1 (Note: Appearance in FA Trophy)	1	4	1
Barton Rovers	2015–16	Southern League Division One Central	12	2	2	0	—		4 (Note: Two appearances in FA Trophy, two appearances and one goal in Bedfordshire Senior Cup)	1	18	3
Brackley Town	2015–16	National League North	0	0	—		—		—		0	0
Brackley Town	2016–17	National League North	1	0	1	1	—		—		2	1
Brackley Town	Total		1	0	1	1	—		—		2	1
Braintree Town	2016–17	National League	2	0	—		—		1	0	3	0
Dunstable Town	2016–17	Southern League Premier Division	6	1	—		—		0	0	6	1
Potton United	2017–18	United Counties League Division One	10	3	—		—		1 (Note: Appearance in North Bedfordshire Charity Cup)	0	11	3
Stratford Town	2018–19	Southern League Premier Division Central	14	1	1	0	—		6 (Note: Two appearances in Birmingham Senior Cup, two in Southern League Cup, two in FA Trophy)	0	21	1
Tamworth	2018–19	Southern League Premier Division Central	13	0	—		—		1 (Note: Appearance in Staffordshire Senior Cup)	0	14	0
Nuneaton Borough	2020–21	Southern League Premier Division Central	5	0	2	0	—		2	0	9	0
AFC Rushden & Diamonds	2021–22	Southern League Premier Division Central	6	0	1	0	—		1 (Note: Appearance in Southern League Cup)	0	8	0
Alvechurch	2021–22	Southern League Premier Division Central	11	3	—		—		2 (Note: One appearance in FA Trophy, one in Birmingham Senior Cup)	0	13	3
Career total			104	14	7	1	0	0	19	2	130	17

== Honours ==
Potton United

- United Counties League Division One runner-up: 2017–18
