= 2013–14 Northampton Town F.C. season =

Northampton Town
2013–14 season
- Chairman: David Cardoza
- Manager: Aidy Boothroyd (Until 21 December); Andy King (caretaker); Chris Wilder (from 26 January)
- Stadium: Sixfields Stadium
- League Two: 21st
- FA Cup: Second round
- League Cup: First round
- League Trophy: First round
- Top goalscorer: League: Darren Carter (5); All: Luke Norris; Darren Carter (5 each)
- Highest home attendance: 7,529 vs Oxford United
- Lowest home attendance: 3,486 vs Milton Keynes Dons
- Average home league attendance: 4,504
| Home colours | Away colours |

The 2013–14 season was Northampton Town's 117th season in their history and the fifth successive season in League Two. Alongside competing in League Two, the club also participated in the FA Cup, League Cup and Football League Trophy.

== Players ==
As of match played 3 May 2014.

| No. | Name | Position | Nat. | Place of Birth | Date of birth (age) | Apps | Goals | Previous club | Date signed | Fee |
Goalkeepers
| 1 | Matt Duke | GK | (England) | Sheffield | 16 June 1977 (aged 36) | 65 | 0 | Bradford City | 24 June 2011 | Free |
| 13 | Dean Snedker | GK | (England) | Northampton | 17 November 1994 (aged 19) | 3 | 0 | Academy | 1 June 2011 | N/A |
Defenders
| 2 | Leon McSweeney | RB | (Republic of Ireland) | Cork | 19 February 1983 (aged 31) | 18 | 0 | Carlisle United | 30 January 2014 | Free |
| 3 | Joe Widdowson | LB | (England) | Forest Gate | 28 March 1989 (aged 25) | 75 | 0 | Rochdale | 5 July 2012 | Free |
| 5 | Kelvin Langmead | CB | (England) | Coventry | 23 March 1985 (aged 29) | 95 | 12 | Peterborough United | 6 January 2012 | Free |
| 6 | Lee Collins | CB | (England) | Telford | 28 September 1988 (aged 25) | 43 | 1 | Barnsley | 8 February 2013 | Free |
| 12 | Ben Tozer | U | (England) | Plymouth | 1 March 1990 (aged 24) | 171 | 7 | Newcastle United | 23 June 2011 | Free |
| 23 | Zander Diamond | CB | (Scotland) | Alexandria | 12 March 1985 (aged 29) | 14 | 1 | Burton Albion | 21 February 2014 | Loan |
| 25 | Evan Horwood | LB | (England) | Billingham | 10 March 1986 (aged 28) | 8 | 0 | Tranmere Rovers | 24 March 2014 | Loan |
| 27 | Mathias Kouo-Doumbé | CB | (France) | Drancy | 28 October 1979 (aged 34) | 33 | 1 | Milton Keynes Dons | 19 September 2013 | Free |
| 29 | Gregor Robertson | LB | (Scotland) | Edinburgh | 19 January 1984 (aged 30) | 15 | 0 | Crewe Alexandra | 4 February 2014 | Free |
Midfielders
| 4 | Darren Carter | CM | (England) | Solihull | 18 December 1983 (aged 30) | 38 | 5 | Cheltenham Town | 1 August 2013 | Free |
| 8 | Ian Morris | CM | (Republic of Ireland) | Dublin | 27 February 1987 (aged 27) | 36 | 3 | Torquay United | 26 June 2013 | Free |
| 11 | Chris Hackett | W | (England) | Oxford | 1 March 1983 (aged 31) | 89 | 8 | Millwall | 3 July 2012 | Free |
| 17 | Gary Deegan | CM | (Republic of Ireland) | Dublin | 28 September 1987 (aged 26) | 30 | 1 | Hibernian | 25 July 2013 | Free |
| 18 | Alan Connell | AM | (England) | Enfield | 5 February 1983 (aged 31) | 16 | 0 | Bradford City | 30 January 2014 | Free |
| 22 | Lewis Hornby | CM | (England) | Northampton | 25 April 1995 (aged 19) | 29 | 0 | Academy | 10 December 2011 | N/A |
| 25 | Claudio Dias | W | (England) | Milton Keynes | 10 November 1994 (aged 19) | 1 | 0 | Academy | 1 July 2012 | N/A |
| 26 | Matthew Harriott | CM | (England) | Luton | 23 September 1992 (aged 21) | 6 | 0 | Sheffield United | 30 August 2013 | Free |
| 29 | David Moyo | W | (Zimbabwe) | Bulawayo | 17 December 1994 (aged 19) | 13 | 0 | Academy | 25 October 2012 | N/A |
| 34 | Ricky Ravenhill | DM | (England) | Doncaster | 16 January 1981 (aged 33) | 27 | 0 | Bradford City | 30 January 2014 | Free |
| 35 | Brennan Dickenson | LM | (England) | Ferndown | 26 February 1993 (aged 21) | 12 | 1 | Brighton & Hove Albion | 26 June 2013 | Loan |
Forwards
| 7 | Emile Sinclair | FW | (England) | Leeds | 29 December 1987 (aged 26) | 19 | 2 | Crawley Town | 31 January 2014 | Undisclosed |
| 9 | John Marquis | FW | (England) | Lewisham | 16 May 1992 (aged 21) | 14 | 2 | Millwall | 11 February 2014 | Loan |
| 14 | Alex Nicholls | FW | (England) | Stourbridge | 9 December 1987 (aged 26) | 19 | 8 | Walsall | 1 June 2012 | Free |
| 16 | JJ Hooper | FW | (England) | Greenwich | 9 October 1993 (aged 20) | 5 | 0 | Newcastle United | 24 July 2013 | Free |
| 27 | Ivan Toney | FW | (England) | Northampton | 16 March 1996 (aged 18) | 16 | 3 | Academy | 13 November 2012 | N/A |

== Pre-season ==
| 13 July 2013 | Northampton Sileby Rangers | 1–5 | Northampton Town | Fernie Fields |
| 15:00 | Ansell 87' | Report | JJ.Hooper 41', 49', 56'; L.Elford-Alliyu 66'; I.Morris 86' | Attendance: 953 |

| 16 July 2013 | Cogenhoe United | 0–6 | Northampton Town | Compton Park |
| 19:45 | | Report | G.Deegan 39'; L.Elford-Alliyu 41', 44', 75', 88'; D.Purse 56' | Attendance: 650 |

| 20 July 2013 | Northampton Town | 0–1 | Peterborough United | Sixfields Stadium |
| 15:00 | | Report | T.Barnett 66' | Attendance: 1,438 |

| 24 July 2013 | Corby Town | 1–3 | Northampton Town | Steel Park |
| 19:30 | Shariff 69' | Report | JJ.Hooper 19'; I.Toney 84'; K.Cadogan 90' | Attendance: 339 |

| 27 July 2013 | Northampton Town | 2–1 | Stoke City U21s | Sixfields Stadium |
| 15:00 | Hooper 15'; 49' (o.g.) | Report | Barrington 85' | Attendance: 521 |

| 30 July 2013 | Northampton Town | 2–1 | Leicester City | Sixfields Stadium |
| 19:45 | L.Collins 13'; 90' (o.g.) | Report | C.Wood 20' | Attendance: 1,812 |

== Competitions ==
=== Football League Two ===
==== League table ====
| Pos | Team | Pld | W | D | L | GF | GA | GD | Pts | Promotion, qualification or relegation |
|---|---|---|---|---|---|---|---|---|---|---|
| 19 | Hartlepool United | 46 | 14 | 11 | 21 | 50 | 56 | −6 | 53 | |
| 20 | AFC Wimbledon | 46 | 14 | 14 | 18 | 49 | 57 | −8 | 53 (Note: On 28 April AFC Wimbledon were deducted 3 points for fielding an ineligible player.) | |
| 21 | Northampton Town | 46 | 13 | 14 | 19 | 42 | 57 | −15 | 53 | |
| 22 | Wycombe Wanderers | 46 | 12 | 14 | 20 | 46 | 54 | −8 | 50 | |
| 23 | Bristol Rovers (R) | 46 | 12 | 14 | 20 | 43 | 54 | −11 | 50 | Relegation to the Conference Premier |

Updated to match(es) played on 3 May 2014. Source: BBC Sport
Rules for classification: 1) Points; 2) Goal difference; 3) Number of goals scored
(R) Relegated

==== League position by match ====
| Round | 1 | 2 | 3 | 4 | 5 | 6 | 7 | 8 | 9 | 10 | 11 | 12 | 13 | 14 | 15 | 16 | 17 | 18 | 19 | 20 | 21 | 22 | 23 | 24 | 25 | 26 | 27 | 28 | 29 | 30 | 31 | 32 | 33 | 34 | 35 | 36 | 37 | 38 | 39 | 40 | 41 | 42 | 43 | 44 | 45 | 46 |
|---|---|---|---|---|---|---|---|---|---|---|---|---|---|---|---|---|---|---|---|---|---|---|---|---|---|---|---|---|---|---|---|---|---|---|---|---|---|---|---|---|---|---|---|---|---|---|
| Ground | A | H | A | H | A | H | H | A | H | A | A | H | A | H | A | H | A | A | H | A | H | A | A | A | H | H | A | H | A | A | H | H | H | A | A | H | H | A | H | H | A | H | A | H | A | H |
| Result | L | W | L | L | L | D | L | L | D | W | L | D | L | D | L | W | L | D | W | D | L | L | D | W | L | L | D | L | W | L | W | W | D | D | W | D | L | D | D | L | W | W | D | L | W | W |
| Position | 17 | 11 | 16 | 22 | 22 | 21 | 22 | 23 | 23 | 23 | 23 | 23 | 23 | 23 | 24 | 24 | 24 | 24 | 23 | 23 | 24 | 24 | 24 | 24 | 24 | 24 | 24 | 24 | 24 | 24 | 24 | 23 | 23 | 23 | 23 | 23 | 23 | 23 | 23 | 23 | 23 | 23 | 23 | 23 | 22 | 21 |

Source: Northampton Town F.C.
A = Away; H = Home; W = Win; D = Draw; L = Loss

==== Matches ====
Win Draw Loss

| 3 August 2013 1 | York City | 1–0 | Northampton Town | York |
| 15:00 BST | R.Jarvis 90' | | | Stadium: Bootham Crescent; Attendance: 4,388 |

| 10 August 2013 2 | Northampton Town | 3–1 | Newport County | Northampton |
| 15:00 BST | J.Blyth 25'; R.O'Donovan 28'; G.Deegan 83' | Report | C.Washington 89' | Stadium: Sixfields Stadium; Attendance: 4,319 |

| 17 August 2013 3 | Southend United | 2–0 | Northampton Town | Southend-on-Sea |
| 15:00 BST | A.Straker 37'; F.Eastwood 62' | | | Stadium: Roots Hall; Attendance: 5,510 |

| 24 August 2013 4 | Northampton Town | 1–2 | Torquay United | Northampton |
| 15:00 BST | J.Blyth 29' | Report | J.Chapell 72', 78' | Stadium: Sixfields Stadium; Attendance: 4,088 |

| 31 August 2013 5 | Bristol Rovers | 1–0 | Northampton Town | Bristol |
| 15:00 BST | T.Lockyer 2' | Report | | Stadium: Memorial Stadium; Attendance: 5,695 |

| 7 September 2013 6 | Northampton Town | 1–1 | Scunthorpe United | Northampton |
| 15:00 BST | C.Platt 78' | Report | N.Canavan 67' | Stadium: Sixfields Stadium; Attendance: 4,132 |

| 14 September 2013 7 | Northampton Town | 1–2 | Exeter City | Northampton |
| 15:00 BST | J.Blyth 6' | Report | S.Bennett 34'; J.O'Flynn 90' | Stadium: Sixfields Stadium; Attendance: 4,036 |

| 21 September 2013 8 | Mansfield Town | 3–0 | Northampton Town | Mansfield |
| 15:00 BST | B.Hutchinson 31'; Clucas 33'; M.Kouo-Doumbé 64' (o.g.) | Report | | Stadium: Field Mill; Attendance: 3,469 |

| 28 September 2013 9 | Northampton Town | 0–0 | Morecambe | Northampton |
| 15:00 BST | | Report | | Stadium: Sixfields Stadium; Attendance: 3,841 |

| 5 October 2013 10 | AFC Wimbledon | 0–2 | Northampton Town | Kingston upon Thames, London |
| 15:00 BST | | Report | L.Collins 19'; S.Dallas 73' | Stadium: Kingsmeadow; Attendance: 4,222; Referee: Andy D'Urso |

| 12 October 2013 11 | Oxford United | 2–0 | Northampton Town | Oxford |
| 15:00 BST | J.Constable 44'; D.Rose 45' (pen.) | Report | | Stadium: Kassam Stadium; Attendance: 6,177 |

| 19 October 2013 12 | Northampton Town | 2–2 | Dagenham & Redbridge | Northampton |
| 15:00 BST | L.Norris 27'; I.Morris 62' | Report | Z.Hines 39'; R.Murphy 42' | Stadium: Sixfields Stadium; Attendance: 4,046 |

| 22 October 2013 13 | Rochdale | 3–2 | Northampton Town | Rochdale |
| 19:45 BST | I.Henderson 25'; M.Rose 87'; G.Donnelly 90' | Report | L.Norris 1'; S.Dallas 38' | Stadium: Spotland Stadium; Attendance: 2,362 |

| 26 October 2013 14 | Northampton Town | 1–1 | Cheltenham Town | Northampton |
| 14:00 BST | L.Norris 43' | Report | B.Harrison 9' | Stadium: Sixfields Stadium; Attendance: 4,033 |

| 2 November 2013 15 | Plymouth Argyle | 1–0 | Northampton Town | Plymouth |
| 15:00 GMT | L.Alessandra 90' | Report | | Stadium: Home Park; Attendance: 6,547 |

| 16 November 2013 16 | Northampton Town | 1–0 | Fleetwood Town | Northampton |
| 15:00 GMT | L.Norris 90' | Report | | Stadium: Sixfields Stadium; Attendance: 4,076 |

| 23 November 2013 17 | Hartlepool United | 2–0 | Northampton Town | Hartlepool |
| 15:00 GMT | L.James 23'; S.Walton 49' (pen.) | Report | | Stadium: Victoria Park; Attendance: 3,617 |

| 26 November 2013 18 | Chesterfield | 0–0 | Northampton Town | Chesterfield |
| 19:45 GMT | | | | Stadium: Proact Stadium; Attendance: 5,321 |

| 30 November 2013 19 | Northampton Town | 1–0 | Accrington Stanley | Northampton |
| 15:00 GMT | S.Dallas 29' | Report | | Stadium: Sixfields Stadium; Attendance: 4,092 |

| 14 December 2013 20 | Bury | 1–1 | Northampton Town | Bury |
| 15:00 GMT | D.Nardiello 23' (pen.) | Report | D.Howell 29' (o.g.) | Stadium: Gigg Lane; Attendance: 2,835; Referee: Nigel Miller |

| 21 December 2013 21 | Northampton Town | 1–4 | Wycombe Wanderers | Northampton |
| 15:00 GMT | I.McLeod 50' | Report | J.Kuffour 1'; K.Hause 13'; S.Lewis 79'; D.Morgan 84' | Stadium: Sixfields Stadium; Attendance: 4,353 |

| 26 December 2013 22 | Burton Albion | 1–0 | Northampton Town | Burton-upon-Trent |
| 15:00 GMT | I.Sharps 85' | Report | | Stadium: Pirelli Stadium; Attendance: 3,312 |

| 29 December 2013 23 | Portsmouth | 0–0 | Northampton Town | Portsmouth |
| 15:00 GMT | | Report | | Stadium: Fratton Park; Attendance: 15,426 |

| 4 January 2014 24 | Newport County | 1–2 | Northampton Town | Newport, Wales |
| 15:00 GMT | H.Worley 45' | Report | H.Hope 29'; D.Carter 47' | Stadium: Rodney Parade; Attendance: 3,864 |

| 11 January 2014 25 | Northampton Town | 0–2 | York City | Northampton |
| 15:00 GMT | | Report | R.Bowman 68'; W.Fletcher 71' (pen.) | Stadium: Sixfields Stadium; Attendance: 4,448 |

| 25 January 2014 26 | Northampton Town | 1–3 | Chesterfield | Northampton |
| 15:00 GMT | D.Carter 15' (pen.) | Report | D.Gardner 24'; G.Roberts 52'; A.Gnanduillet 87' | Stadium: Sixfields Stadium; Attendance: 5,082 |

| 1 February 2014 27 | Cheltenham Town | 1–1 | Northampton Town | Cheltenham |
| 15:00 GMT | J.Cureton 1' | Report | M.Blair 76' | Stadium: Whaddon Road; Attendance: 2,707; Referee: Paul Tierney |

| 8 February 2014 28 | Northampton Town | 0–2 | Plymouth Argyle | Northampton |
| 15:00 GMT | | Report | R.Reid 5'; L.Alessandra 39' | Stadium: Sixfields Stadium; Attendance: 4,845; Referee: Nigel Miller |

| 11 February 2014 29 | Torquay United | 1–2 | Northampton Town | Torquay |
| 19:45 GMT | K.Pearce 45' | Report | E.Sinclair 10', 16' | Stadium: Plainmoor; Attendance: 2,051; Referee: Chris Sarginson |

| 15 February 2014 30 | Fleetwood Town | 2–0 | Northampton Town | Fleetwood |
| 15:00 GMT | G.Evans 22', 79' | Report | | Stadium: Highbury Stadium; Attendance: 2,521; Referee: Richard Clark |

| 22 February 2014 31 | Northampton Town | 2–0 | Hartlepool United | Northampton |
| 15:00 GMT | M.Kouo-Doumbé 45+7'; B.Dickenson 47' | Report | | Stadium: Sixfields Stadium; Attendance: 4,083; Referee: Darren Bond |

| 25 February 2014 32 | Northampton Town | 2–1 | Southend United | Northampton |
| 19:45 GMT | M.Kouo-Doumbé 6'; C.Hackett 57' | Report | M.Timlin 16' | Stadium: Sixfields Stadium; Attendance: 3,846 |

| 1 March 2014 33 | Northampton Town | 0–0 | Bristol Rovers | Northampton |
| 15:00 GMT | | Report | | Stadium: Sixfields Stadium; Attendance: 5,058 |

| 8 March 2014 34 | Scunthorpe United | 1–1 | Northampton Town | Scunthorpe |
| 15:00 GMT | N.Canavan 52' | Report | Z.Diamond 64' | Stadium: Glanford Park; Attendance: 3,968 |

| 11 March 2014 35 | Exeter City | 0–1 | Northampton Town | Exeter |
| 19:45 GMT | | Report | I.Morris 56' | Stadium: St James Park; Attendance: 2,785 |

| 15 March 2014 36 | Northampton Town | 1–1 | Mansfield Town | Northampton |
| 15:00 GMT | D.Carter 64' (pen.) | Report | O.Palmer 32' | Stadium: Sixfields Stadium; Attendance: 5,129 |

| 18 March 2014 37 | Northampton Town | 0–3 | Rochdale | Northampton |
| 19:45 GMT | | Report | I.Henderson 5'; M.Lund 54'; J.Bunney 64' | Stadium: Sixfields Stadium; Attendance: 3,695 |

| 22 March 2014 38 | Morecambe | 1–1 | Northampton Town | Morecambe |
| 15:00 GMT | P.Amond 75' | Report | A.Wright 45' (o.g.) | Stadium: Globe Arena; Attendance: 1,761 |

| 25 March 2014 39 | Northampton Town | 2–2 | AFC Wimbledon | Northampton |
| 19:45 GMT | D.Carter 28' (pen.), 78' | Report | G.Francomb 14'; S.Moore 90' | Stadium: Sixfields Stadium; Attendance: 3,812 |

| 29 March 2014 40 | Northampton Town | 0–3 | Bury | Northampton |
| 15:00 GMT | | Report | H.Hope 18'; D.Mayor 35'; D.Rose 90' | Stadium: Sixfields Stadium; Attendance: 4,631 |

| 5 April 2014 41 | Accrington Stanley | 0–1 | Northampton Town | Accrington |
| 15:00 BST | | Report | C.Hackett 4' | Stadium: Crown Ground; Attendance: 1,616; Referee: Fred Graham |

| 12 April 2014 42 | Northampton Town | 1–0 | Burton Albion | Northampton |
| 15:00 BST | J.Marquis 43' | Report | | Stadium: Sixfields Stadium; Attendance: 4,604; Referee: Carl Berry |

| 18 April 2014 43 | Wycombe Wanderers | 1–1 | Northampton Town | High Wycombe |
| 15:00 BST | A.Pierre 18' | Report | M.Ingram 12' (o.g.) | Stadium: Adams Park; Attendance: 7,004; Referee: Andy D'Urso |

| 21 April 2014 44 | Northampton Town | 0–1 | Portsmouth | Northampton |
| 15:00 BST | | Report | D.East 6' | Stadium: Sixfields Stadium; Attendance: 6,829; Referee: Darren Deadman |

| 26 April 2014 45 | Dagenham & Redbridge | 0–3 | Northampton Town | Dagenham, London |
| 15:00 BST | | Report | I.Toney 8', 40'; I.Morris 12' | Stadium: Victoria Road; Attendance: 2,668; Referee: Scott Mathieson |

| 3 May 2014 46 | Northampton Town | 3–1 | Oxford United | Northampton |
| 15:00 BST | J.Marquis 29'; I.Toney 33'; M.Kouo-Doumbé 51' | Report | R.Williams 7' (red card) 20' | Stadium: Sixfields Stadium; Attendance: 7,529; Referee: Scott Duncan |

=== FA Cup ===
| 10 November 2013 First round | Bishop's Stortford | 1–2 | Northampton Town | ProKit UK Stadium |
| 14:00 | Prestedge 81' | Report | D.Emerton 62'; L.Norris 68' | Attendance: 2,545 |

| 7 December 2013 Second round | Grimsby Town | 2–0 | Northampton Town | Blundell Park |
| 15:00 | S.Pearson 64'; P.McLaughlin 90' | Report | | Attendance: 3,828 |

=== League Cup ===
| 6 August 2013 First round | Northampton Town | 1–2 | Milton Keynes Dons | Sixfields Stadium |
| 19:45 | R.O'Donovan 76' | Report | B.Reeves 12'; J.Banton 53' | Attendance: 3,486 |

=== League Trophy ===
| 3 September 2013 First round (s) | Milton Keynes Dons | 2–0 | Northampton Town | Stadium mk |
| 19:45 | P.Bamford 52'; D.Alli 58' | Report | | Attendance: 4,299 |

=== Appearances, goals and cards ===
| No. | Pos | Player | League Two | | | FA Cup | | | League Cup | | | League Trophy | | | Total | | | Discipline | |
| No. | Pos | Player | Starts | Sub | Goals | Starts | Sub | Goals | Starts | Sub | Goals | Starts | Sub | Goals | Starts | Sub | Goals | Booked | Sent off (straight red) |
|---|---|---|---|---|---|---|---|---|---|---|---|---|---|---|---|---|---|---|---|
| 1 | GK | Matt Duke | 46 | – | – | 2 | – | – | 1 | – | – | 1 | – | – | 50 | – | – | 1 | – |
| 2 | RB | Leon McSweeney | 16 | 2 | – | – | – | – | – | – | – | – | – | – | 16 | 2 | – | 2 | – |
| 3 | LB | Joe Widdowson | 24 | 1 | – | 2 | – | – | 1 | – | – | – | – | – | 27 | 1 | – | 3 | – |
| 4 | CM | Darren Carter | 37 | – | 5 | – | – | – | – | – | – | 1 | – | – | 38 | – | 5 | 10 | 1 |
| 5 | CB | Kelvin Langmead | – | 3 | – | – | – | – | – | – | – | – | – | – | – | 3 | – | – | – |
| 6 | CB | Lee Collins | 21 | 1 | 1 | 1 | – | – | 1 | – | – | 1 | – | – | 24 | 1 | 1 | 5 | – |
| 7 | ST | Emile Sinclair | 15 | 4 | 2 | – | – | – | - | – | – | – | – | – | 15 | 4 | 2 | – | – |
| 8 | LM | Ian Morris | 23 | 10 | 3 | 1 | 1 | – | 1 | – | – | – | – | – | 25 | 11 | 3 | 1 | – |
| 9 | ST | John Marquis | 12 | 2 | 2 | – | – | – | – | – | – | – | – | – | 12 | 2 | 2 | 4 | – |
| 11 | RM | Chris Hackett | 35 | 2 | 2 | 2 | – | – | – | – | – | 1 | – | – | 38 | 2 | 2 | 9 | 1 |
| 12 | U | Ben Tozer | 21 | 8 | – | – | 1 | – | 1 | – | – | 1 | – | – | 23 | 9 | – | 3 | – |
| 13 | GK | Dean Snedker | – | – | – | – | – | – | – | – | – | – | – | – | – | – | – | – | – |
| 14 | ST | Alex Nicholls | – | – | – | – | – | – | – | – | – | – | – | – | – | – | – | – | – |
| 15 | CM | Lewis Hornby | – | – | – | – | – | – | – | – | – | – | – | – | – | – | – | – | – |
| 16 | ST | JJ Hooper | – | 3 | – | – | – | – | 1 | – | – | – | 1 | – | 1 | 4 | – | – | – |
| 17 | CM | Gary Deegan | 22 | 5 | 1 | 1 | – | – | 1 | – | – | 1 | – | – | 25 | 5 | 1 | 9 | – |
| 18 | AM | Alan Connell | 11 | 5 | – | – | – | – | – | – | – | – | – | – | 11 | 5 | – | 1 | – |
| 20 | ST | David Moyo | – | 6 | – | – | – | – | – | 1 | – | – | – | – | – | 7 | – | – | – |
| 22 | CM | Claudio Dias | – | – | – | – | – | – | – | – | – | – | – | – | – | – | – | – | – |
| 23 | CB | Zander Diamond | 14 | – | 1 | – | – | – | – | – | – | – | – | – | 14 | – | 1 | – | – |
| 24 | ST | Ivan Toney | 3 | 10 | 3 | – | – | – | – | 1 | – | – | 1 | – | 3 | 12 | 3 | 2 | – |
| 25 | LB | Evan Horwood | 7 | 1 | – | – | – | – | – | – | – | – | – | – | 7 | 1 | – | 1 | – |
| 26 | CM | Matthew Harriott | 2 | 3 | – | – | – | – | – | – | – | 1 | – | – | 3 | 3 | – | – | – |
| 27 | CB | Mathias Kouo-Doumbé | 30 | 1 | 3 | 2 | – | – | – | – | – | – | – | – | 32 | 1 | 3 | 2 | – |
| 29 | LB | Gregor Robertson | 14 | 1 | – | – | – | – | – | – | – | – | – | – | 14 | 1 | – | 3 | – |
| 30 | CB | Kashif Siddiqi | – | – | – | – | – | – | – | – | – | – | – | – | – | – | – | – | – |
| 34 | CM | Ricky Ravenhill | 25 | – | – | 2 | – | – | – | – | – | – | – | – | 27 | – | – | 5 | 1 |
| 35 | LM | Brennan Dickenson | 8 | 4 | 1 | – | – | – | – | – | – | – | – | – | 8 | 4 | 1 | – | – |
Players no longer at the club:
| 2 | RB | Kevin Amankwaah | 21 | – | – | 1 | – | – | 1 | – | – | 1 | – | – | 24 | – | – | 2 | – |
| 7 | ST | Ishmel Demontagnac | 2 | 7 | – | – | 1 | – | – | 1 | – | 1 | – | – | 3 | 9 | – | – | – |
| 9 | ST | Clive Platt | 7 | 4 | 1 | – | 1 | – | – | – | – | – | – | – | 7 | 5 | 1 | – | – |
| 10 | ST | Cristian López | – | 3 | – | – | – | – | – | – | – | – | – | – | – | 3 | – | – | – |
| 10 | ST | Roy O'Donovan | 10 | 5 | 1 | – | – | – | 1 | – | 1 | – | – | – | 11 | 5 | 2 | 3 | 1 |
| 18 | CB | Paul Reid | 16 | – | – | 2 | – | – | – | – | – | – | – | – | 18 | – | – | 5 | – |
| 19 | RM | Danny Emerton | 11 | 5 | – | 2 | – | 1 | 1 | – | – | – | 1 | – | 14 | 6 | 1 | 1 | – |
| 23 | ST | Matt Heath | 5 | – | – | – | – | – | 1 | – | – | 1 | – | – | 7 | – | – | 2 | – |
| 23 | LB | Sean McGinty | 2 | – | – | – | – | – | – | – | – | – | – | – | 2 | – | – | – | – |
| 25 | ST | Jacob Blyth | 8 | 3 | 3 | 2 | – | – | – | – | – | 1 | – | – | 11 | 3 | 3 | – | – |
| 25 | W | Antonio German | 5 | 2 | – | – | – | – | – | – | – | – | – | – | 5 | 2 | – | – | – |
| 29 | W | Stuart Dallas | 10 | 2 | 3 | – | – | – | – | – | – | – | – | – | 10 | 2 | 3 | 1 | – |
| 29 | ST | Hallam Hope | 3 | – | 1 | – | – | – | – | – | – | – | – | – | 3 | – | 1 | – | – |
| 32 | CM | Kane Ferdinand | 4 | – | – | 1 | – | – | – | – | – | – | – | – | 5 | – | – | – | – |
| 32 | W | Matty Blair | 3 | – | 1 | – | – | – | – | – | – | – | – | – | 3 | – | 1 | – | – |
| 33 | ST | Luke Norris | 8 | 2 | 4 | 1 | 1 | 1 | – | – | – | – | – | – | 9 | 3 | 5 | 1 | – |
| 39 | ST | Izale McLeod | 4 | – | 1 | – | – | – | – | – | – | – | – | – | 4 | – | 1 | – | – |

== Transfers ==
=== Transfers in ===
Players transferred in
| Position | Player | Previous club | Fee | Date | Source |
|---|---|---|---|---|---|
| GK | (England) Matt Duke | Bradford City | Free transfer | 24 June 2013 | |
| MF | (Republic of Ireland) Ian Morris | Torquay United | Free transfer | 26 June 2013 | |
| MF | (England) Darren Carter | Cheltenham Town | Free transfer | 1 August 2013 | |
| FW | (England) JJ Hooper | Newcastle United | Free transfer | 24 July 2013 | |
| MF | (Republic of Ireland) Gary Deegan | Hibernian | Free transfer | 25 July 2013 | |
| DF | (England) Kevin Amankwaah | Exeter City | Free transfer | 29 July 2013 | |
| DF | (England) Matt Heath | Colchester United | Free transfer | 1 August 2013 | |
| MF | (England) Danny Emerton | Hull City | Free transfer | 1 August 2013 | |
| MF | (England) Matty Harriott | Sheffield United | Free transfer | 30 August 2013 | |
| GK | (Australia) Ben McNamara | Nuneaton Town | Free transfer | 7 September 2013 | |
| DF | (Pakistan) Kashif Siddiqi | Ventura County Fusion | Free transfer | 10 September 2013 | |
| DF | (France) Mathias Kouo-Doumbé | Milton Keynes Dons | Free transfer | 19 September 2013 | |
| DF | (England) Paul Reid | Scunthorpe United | Free transfer | 27 September 2013 | |
| FW | (England) Alan Connell | Bradford City | Free transfer | 30 January 2014 | |
| MF | (England) Ricky Ravenhill | Bradford City | Free transfer | 30 January 2014 | |
| DF | (Republic of Ireland) Leon McSweeney | Carlisle United | Free transfer | 30 January 2014 | |
| DF | (Scotland) Gregor Robertson | Crewe Alexandra | Free transfer | 4 February 2014 | |

=== Loans in ===
Players loaned in
| Position | Player | Loaned from | Date | Loan expires | Source |
|---|---|---|---|---|---|
| FW | (England) Jacob Blyth | Leicester City | 9 August 2013 | 3 October 2013 | |
| MF | (Northern Ireland) Stuart Dallas | Brentford | 5 October 2013 | 1 January 2014 | |
| FW | (England) Luke Norris | Brentford | 18 October 2013 | 4 January 2014 | |
| MF | (England) Kane Ferdinand | Peterborough United | 31 October 2013 | 28 November 2013 | |
| FW | (England) Jacob Blyth | Leicester City | 6 November 2013 | 15 December 2013 | |
| MF | (England) Ricky Ravenhill | Bradford City | 6 November 2013 | 4 January 2014 | |
| FW | (England) Izale McLeod | Milton Keynes Dons | 28 November 2013 | 4 January 2014 | |

=== Loans out ===
Players loaned out
| Position | Player | Loaned to | Date | Loan expires | Source |
|---|---|---|---|---|---|
| FW | (Zimbabwe) David Moyo | Corby Town | 23 August 2013 | 22 September 2013 | |
| MF | (England) Claudio Dias | Corby Town | 30 August 2013 | 29 September 2013 | |
| GK | (England) Dean Snedker | Carshalton Athletic | 6 September 2013 | 7 December 2013 | |
| FW | (Zimbabwe) David Moyo | Stamford | 4 October 2013 | 4 January 2014 | |
| MF | (England) Matty Harriott | Hayes and Yeading United | 15 November 2013 | 14 January 2014 | |
| FW | (England) JJ Hooper | Alfreton Town | 28 November 2013 | 27 December 2013 | |
| DF | (England) Ben Tozer | Colchester United | 28 November 2013 | 4 January 2014 | |
| GK | (England) Dean Snedker | Banbury United | 9 December 2013 | 5 January 2014 | |
| MF | (England) Claudio Dias | Banbury United | 13 December 2013 | 12 January 2014 | |

=== Transfers out ===
Players transferred out
| Position | Player | Next club | Fee | Date | Source |
|---|---|---|---|---|---|
| FW | (England) Adebayo Akinfenwa | Gillingham | Free transfer (Released) | 21 May 2013 | |
| DF | (England) John Johnson | Bengaluru FC | Free transfer (Released) | 21 May 2013 | |
| FW | (England) Louis Moult | Nuneaton Town | Free transfer (Released) | 21 May 2013 | |
| FW | (England) Jake Robinson | Whitehawk | Free transfer (Released) | 21 May 2013 | |
| FW | (England) Lewis Wilson | Kettering Town | Free transfer (Released) | 21 May 2013 | |
| MF | (England) Paul Turnbull | Macclesfield Town | Free transfer (Released) | 21 May 2013 | |
| DF | (England) Seth Nana Twumasi | Yeovil Town | Free transfer (Released) | 21 May 2013 | |
| DF | (England) Clarke Carlisle | Retired | N/A | 23 May 2013 | |
| MF | (England) Luke Guttridge | Luton Town | Free transfer (Released) | 26 June 2013 | |
| MF | (England) Ben Harding | Torquay United | Free transfer (Released) | 26 June 2013 | |
| MF | (England) David Artell | Wrexham | Free transfer (Released) | 31 August 2013 | |
| FW | (England) Clive Platt | Bury | Free transfer (Released) | 10 January 2014 | |
| DF | (England) Kevin Amankwaah | Salisbury City | Free transfer (Released) | 23 January 2014 | |
| DF | (England) Paul Reid | Free agent | Free transfer (Released) | 28 January 2014 | |
| MF | (England) Ishmel Demontagnac | Free agent | Free transfer (Released) | 31 January 2014 | |
| FW | (Republic of Ireland) Roy O'Donovan | Brunei DPMM FC | Free transfer (Released) | 14 February 2014 | |
