= 2012 Guadiana Trophy =

Tournament details
- Host country: Portugal
- Dates: 26 – 28 July 2012
- Teams: 3
- Venue(s): Estádio Algarve, Faro

Final positions
- Champions: (England) Newcastle United (1st title)
- Runners-up: (Greece) Olympiacos
- Third place: (Portugal) Braga

Tournament statistics
- Matches played: 3
- Goals scored: 7 (2.33 per match)
- Top scorer(s): 1 – Ruben Amorim (Braga); Demba Ba (Newcastle United); Lima (Braga); Kostas Mitroglou (Olympiacos); Andreas Tatos (Olympiacos); Ryan Taylor (Newcastle United); Steven Taylor (Newcastle United)
- Best player(s): Hugo Viana (Braga)

The 2012 Guadiana Trophy was the 12th edition of the competition and took place between 26 and 28 July. It featured Braga, Newcastle United and Olympiacos. The trophy was won by Newcastle United after they drew their first game with Olympiakos and won their second game against Braga, who'd drawn their first game with Olympiakos.

== Standings ==
Team	Pld	W	D	L	GF	GA	GD	Pts
(England) Newcastle United	2	1	1	0	3	2	+1	4
(Greece) Olympiakos	2	0	2	0	2	2	0	2
(Portugal) Braga	2	0	1	1	2	3	−1	1

== Matches ==
26 July 2012	Braga (Portugal)	1 – 1 (4 – 4 p)	(Greece) Olympiacos	Estádio Algarve, Faro
20:45	Lima 36'	Report	Tatos 7'
	Penalties
	Lima (penalty scored); Éder (penalty scored); Custódio (penalty scored); Paulo César (penalty scored); Viana (penalty missed)		(penalty missed) Siovas; (penalty scored) Fejsa; (penalty scored) Chumbinho; (penalty scored) Fetfatzidis; (penalty scored) Djebbour

27 July 2012	Newcastle United (England)	1 – 1 (4 – 4 p)	(Greece) Olympiacos	Estádio Algarve, Faro
20:45	S. Taylor 25'	Report	Mitroglou 79'; Modesto (red card) 74'	Referee: João Ferreira (Portugal)
	Penalties
	Cissé (penalty missed); Vučkić (penalty scored); Amalfitano (penalty scored); Perch (penalty scored); Abeid (penalty scored)		(penalty scored) Abdoun; (penalty scored) Maniatis; (penalty scored) Pantelić; (penalty scored) Holebas; (penalty missed) Tatos

28 July 2012	Newcastle United (England)	2 – 1	(Portugal) Braga	Estádio Algarve, Faro
20:45	Ba 64'; R. Taylor 73'	Report	Amorim 68'; Douglão (red card) 83'	Referee: Paulo Baptista (Portugal)
