= Danny Emerton =

English footballer

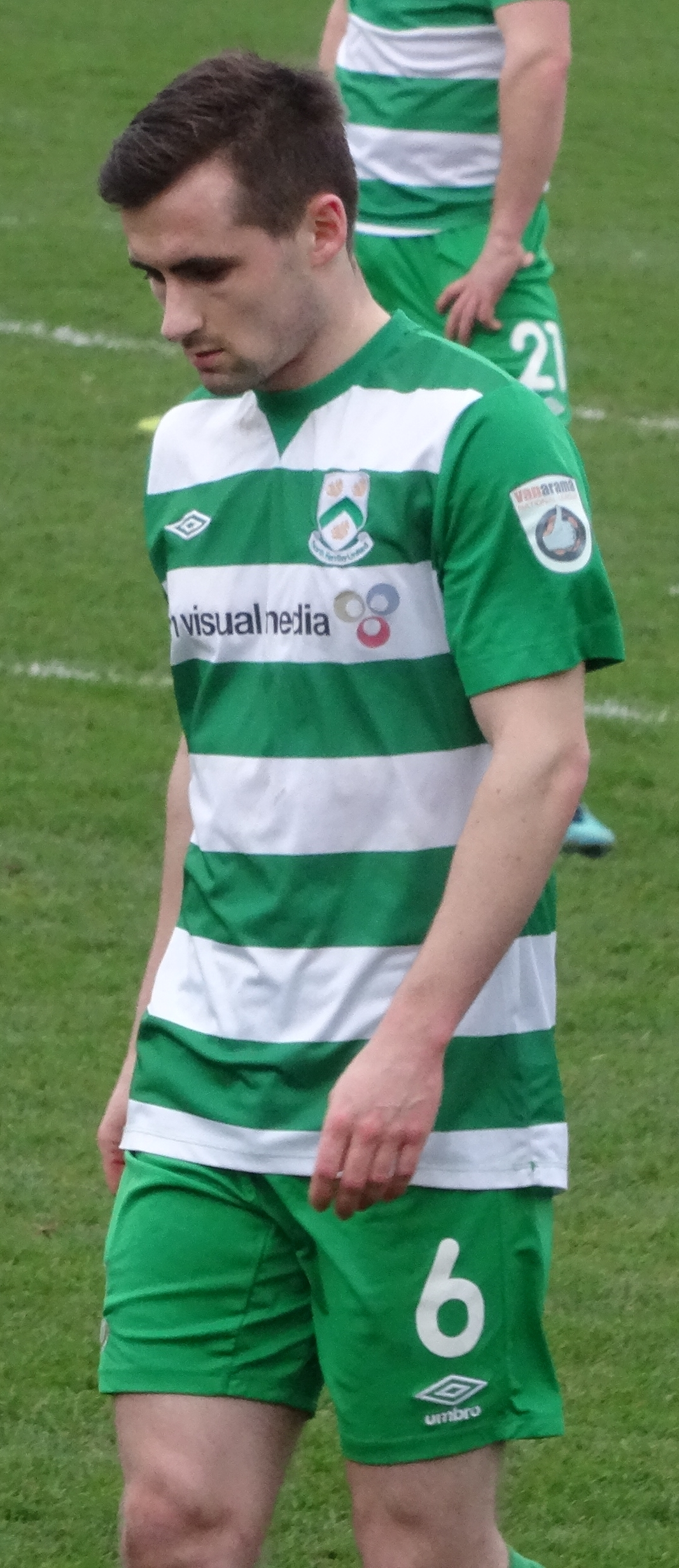
- Emerton playing for North Ferriby United in 2017

Personal information
- Full name: Daniel James Emerton
- Date of birth: 27 September 1991 (age 35)
- Place of birth: Beverley, England
- Positions: Forward; winger

Team information
- Current team: North Ferriby
- Number: 6

Youth career
- 2008–2010: Hull City

Senior career*
Years	Team	Apps	(Gls)
2010–2013	Hull City	0	(0)
2011	→ IK Frej (loan)	5	(0)
2012–2013	→ Alfreton Town (loan)	2	(0)
2013–2014	Northampton Town	16	(0)
2014–2019	North Ferriby United	99	(7)
2019–	North Ferriby		
- * Club domestic league appearances and goals as of 11:21, 22 December 2017 (UTC)

Daniel James Emerton (born 27 September 1991) is an English semi-professional footballer who plays as a forward or a winger for Northern Counties East League club North Ferriby.

== Career ==
Born in Beverley, East Riding of Yorkshire, Emerton began his footballing career at Hull City's Academy at the age of 12. He signed his first professional contract in May 2010 after a successful 2009–2010 title winning youth campaign under the guidance of youth team managers Billy Russell and Neil Mann. In April 2011 he joined Division 1 Norra team IK Frej on a one-month loan, making his debut on 25 April, against BK Forward. He returned to Hull after making five appearances.

On 23 November 2012, Emerton was loaned to Alfreton Town. On 24 November 2013 he made his debut for Alfreton Town in the FA Trophy against Kidderminster Harriers and then went on to make two appearances, all from the bench, and returned to Hull in January 2013. Emerton was released from Hull at the end of 2012–13 season having spent three seasons with the club.

On 1 August, Emerton signed a one-year deal with Northampton Town. Two days later, he made his professional debut, in a 0–1 away defeat against York City. He scored his first goal for the club in a 2–1 win over Bishop's Stortford in a televised FA Cup first round match on 10 November 2013. On 4 March 2014, Emerton had his contract at Northampton Town terminated after Chris Wilder became the permanent manager after the sacking of Aidy Boothroyd.

On 7 March, he signed for Conference North club North Ferriby United, scoring on his debut against Histon on 8 March. He made 12 appearances in the closing stage of the season and played in both legs of the play-off semi-final against Guiseley, which North Ferriby lost 3–0 on aggregate.

In 2019, following the winding up of North Ferriby United, he joined phoenix club North Ferriby.

== Career statistics ==
As of match played 16 December 2017

Appearances and goals by club, season and competition
Club	Season	League			National Cup		League Cup		Other		Total	
Club	Season	Division	Apps	Goals	Apps	Goals	Apps	Goals	Apps	Goals	Apps	Goals
Hull City	2011–12	Championship	0	0	0	0	0	0	—		0	0
IK Frej (loan)	2011	Division Ett	5	0	0	0	—		—		5	0
Alfreton Town (loan)	2012–13	Conference Premier	2	0	1	0	—		1 (Note: Appearances in the FA Trophy)	0	4	0
Northampton Town	2013–14	League Two	16	0	2	1	1	0	1 (Note: Appearance in the Football League Trophy)	0	20	1
North Ferriby United	2013–14	Conference North	10	1	—		—		0	0	10	1
North Ferriby United	2014–15	Conference North	7	1	0	0	—		0	0	7	1
North Ferriby United	2015–16	National League North	37	4	2	0	—		0	0	39	4
North Ferriby United	2016–17	National League	41	1	1	0	—		1	0	43	1
North Ferriby United	2017–18	National League North	4	0	0	0	—		0	0	4	0
North Ferriby United	North Ferriby total		99	7	3	0	0	0	1	0	103	7
Career total			122	7	6	1	1	0	3	0	132	8
