= 2011–12 Northampton Town F.C. season =

Northampton Town
2011–12 season
- Chairman: David Cardoza
- Manager: Aidy Boothroyd
- Stadium: Sixfields Stadium
- League Two: 20th
- FA Cup: First round
- League Cup: Second round
- League Trophy: First round
- Top goalscorer: League: Adebayo Akinfenwa (18); All: Adebayo Akinfenwa (18)
- Highest home attendance: 6,860 vs Oxford United
- Lowest home attendance: 1,776 vs Huddersfield Town
Home colours	Away colours

The 2011–12 season was Northampton Town's 115th season in their history and the third successive season in League Two. Alongside competing in League Two, the club also participated in the FA Cup, League Cup and Football League Trophy.

== Players ==
As of match played 5 May 2012.

No.	Name	Position	Nat.	Place of Birth	Date of birth (age)	Apps	Goals	Previous club	Date signed	Fee
Goalkeepers
1	Shane Higgs	GK	(England)	Oxford	13 May 1977 (aged 34)	3	0	Leeds United	22 December 2011	Free
13	Neal Kitson	GK	(United States)	New York City	6 January 1986 (aged 26)	8	0	Rochester Rhinos	31 January 2012	Free
26	Freddy Hall	GK	(Bermuda)	St. George's	3 March 1985 (aged 27)	3	0	Bermuda Hogges	7 July 2011	Free
Defenders
3	Anthony Charles	CB	(England)	Isleworth	11 March 1981 (aged 31)	9	0	Aldershot Town	13 March 2012	Free
4	Jason Crowe	RB	(England)	Sidcup	30 September 1978 (aged 33)	205	17	Leyton Orient	12 November 2011	Free
5	Ben Tozer	U	(England)	Plymouth	1 March 1990 (aged 22)	83	7	Newcastle United	23 June 2011	Free
6	Byron Webster	CB	(England)	Leeds	31 March 1987 (aged 25)	24	0	Doncaster Rovers	17 May 2011	Free
14	John Johnson	RB	(England)	Middlesbrough	16 September 1988 (aged 23)	127	14	Middlesbrough	23 July 2010	Free
25	Clarke Carlisle	CB	(England)	Preston	14 October 1979 (aged 32)	18	1	Burnley	31 January 2012	Loan
28	Kelvin Langmead	CB	(England)	Coventry	23 March 1985 (aged 27)	45	4	Peterborough United	6 January 2012	Free
29	Blair Adams	LB	(England)	South Shields	8 September 1991 (aged 20)	22	0	Sunderland	2 January 2012	Loan
33	Seth Nana Twumasi	RB	(England)	Accra (GHA)	15 May 1992 (aged 19)	17	0	Peterborough United	31 May 2011	Free
Midfielders
2	Lewis Young	W	(England)	Stevenage	27 September 1989 (aged 22)	33	0	Burton Albion	7 July 2011	Free
7	Arron Davies	RM	(Wales)	Cardiff	22 June 1984 (aged 27)	19	4	Peterborough United	30 June 2011	Free
11	Andy Holt	LB/LM	(England)	Stockport	21 April 1978 (aged 34)	220	17	Wrexham	27 June 2006	Free
12	Nat Wedderburn	CM	(England)	Wolverhampton	30 June 1991 (aged 20)	40	0	Stoke City	14 June 2010	Free
15	Paul Turnbull	CM	(England)	Handforth	23 January 1989 (aged 23)	18	1	Stockport County	29 June 2011	Free
17	Michael Jacobs	W	(England)	Rothwell	4 November 1991 (aged 20)	100	15	Apprentice	1 July 2009	N/A
20	Ryan Gilligan	CM	(England)	Swindon	18 January 1987 (aged 25)	206	23	Watford	12 August 2005	Free
22	Luke Guttridge	CM	(England)	Barnstaple	27 March 1982 (aged 30)	82	12	Aldershot Town	27 January 2012	Free
24	Toni Silva	W	(Portugal)	Bissau (GUI)	15 September 1993 (aged 18)	15	1	Liverpool	14 February 2012	Free
27	Ben Harding	CM	(England)	Carshalton	6 September 1984 (aged 27)	19	0	Wycombe Wanderers	31 January 2012	Free
Forwards
8	Jake Robinson	FW	(England)	Brighton	23 October 1986 (aged 25)	34	0	Shrewsbury Town	8 June 2011	Free
9	Brett Williams	FW	(England)	Southampton	1 December 1987 (aged 24)	18	3	Reading	8 February 2012	Loan
10	Adebayo Akinfenwa	FW	(England)	Islington	10 May 1982 (aged 29)	137	57	Gillingham	25 May 2011	Free
23	Lewis Wilson	FW	(England)	Milton Keynes	19 February 1993 (aged 19)	3	1	Newport Pagnell Town	31 January 2012	Free

== Pre-season ==
16 July 2011 Friendly	Brackley Town	1–0	Northampton Town	Brackley
15:00 BST	Sandy 56'			Stadium: St. James Park; Attendance: 556

19 July 2011 Friendly	Oxford City	2–2	Northampton Town	Oxford
19:45 BST	L.Steele 37'; Basham 48'		T.Purcell 14'; M.Built 62'	Stadium: Court Place Farm; Attendance: 300

20 July 2011 Friendly	Northampton Town	1–2	Nottingham Forest	Northampton
19:45 BST	J.Robinson 3'		L.Chambers 52'; L.McGugan 59'	Stadium: Sixfields Stadium; Attendance: 2,263

23 July 2011 Friendly	Northampton Town	0–3	Reading	Northampton
15:00 BST			S.Long 45', 49' (pen.); H.Robson-Kanu 61'	Stadium: Sixfields Stadium; Attendance: 1,554

26 July 2011 Friendly	Cambridge United	2–0	Northampton Town	Cambridge
19:45 BST	L.Berry 33'; R.Charles 67'			Stadium: Abbey Stadium; Attendance: 857

30 July 2011 Friendly	Northampton Town	2–1	Wycombe Wanderers	Northampton
15:00 BST	B.Tozer 20'; N.McKoy 78'		G.Ainsworth 18'	Stadium: Sixfields Stadium; Attendance: 1,044; Referee: Andy Woolmer

== Competitions ==
=== Football League Two ===
==== League table ====
Pos	Team	Pld	W	D	L	GF	GA	GD	Pts
18	Bradford City	46	12	14	20	54	59	−5	50
19	Dagenham & Redbridge	46	14	8	24	50	72	−22	50
20	Northampton Town	46	12	12	22	56	79	−23	48
21	Plymouth Argyle	46	10	16	20	47	64	−17	46
22	Barnet	46	12	10	24	52	79	−27	46

Updated to match(es) played on 5 May 2012. Source: BBC Sport
Rules for classification: 1) Points; 2) Goal difference; 3) Number of goals scored

==== Results summary ====
Overall								Home						Away					
Pld	W	D	L	GF	GA	GD	Pts	W	D	L	GF	GA	GD	W	D	L	GF	GA	GD
46	12	12	22	56	79	−23	48	6	6	11	30	43	−13	6	6	11	26	36	−10

Last updated: 5 May 2012.
Source: Northampton Town F.C.

==== League position by match ====
Round	1	2	3	4	5	6	7	8	9	10	11	12	13	14	15	16	17	18	19	20	21	22	23	24	25	26	27	28	29	30	31	32	33	34	35	36	37	38	39	40	41	42	43	44	45	46
Ground	H	A	A	H	H	A	H	A	A	H	A	H	A	A	H	H	A	H	A	H	A	H	H	A	A	H	H	A	H	H	H	A	H	H	A	H	A	A	H	A	A	A	H	A	H	A
Result	D	W	L	L	L	D	D	W	L	W	W	L	L	L	L	D	L	L	L	D	L	L	L	D	W	L	L	L	W	W	L	D	W	W	W	L	W	D	D	W	L	L	L	D	D	D
Position	15	7	13	17	19	22	21	18	20	17	14	15	17	17	19	18	20	20	21	20	22	23	24	23	23	24	24	24	24	23	23	24	23	22	19	19	18	18	18	18	20	20	20	20	19	20

Updated to match(es) played on 5 May 2012. Source: BBC Sport
A = Away; H = Home; W = Win; D = Draw; L = Loss

==== Matches ====
Win Draw Loss

6 August 2011 1	Northampton Town	0–0	Accrington Stanley	Northampton
15:00 BST		Report		Stadium: Sixfields Stadium; Attendance: 4,621; Referee: Iain Williamson

13 August 2011 2	Aldershot Town	0–1	Northampton Town	Aldershot
15:00 BST		Report	A.Westwood 2'	Stadium: EBB Stadium; Attendance: 2,790; Referee: Roger East

16 August 2011 3	Bristol Rovers	2–1	Northampton Town	Bristol
19:45 BST	J.Kuffour 29'; M.Harrold 75'	Report	A.Akinfenwa 64'	Stadium: Memorial Stadium; Attendance: 5,812; Referee: Lee Collins

20 August 2011 4	Northampton Town	2–3	Cheltenham Town	Northampton
15:00 BST	A.Davies 39'; A.Akinfenwa 51'	Report	D.Duffy 11' (pen.), 68'; J.Low 80'	Stadium: Sixfields Stadium; Attendance: 4,114; Referee: Mark Heywood

27 August 2011 5	Northampton Town	0–2	Morecambe	Northampton
15:00 BST		Report	P.Jevons 15'; L.Wilson 25' (pen.)	Stadium: Sixfields Stadium; Attendance: 4,016; Referee: Brendan Malone

3 September 2011 6	Southend United	2–2	Northampton Town	Southend-on-Sea
15:00 BST	B.Mohsni 27'; R.Hall 59'	Report	A.Akinfenwa 60'; A.Davies 65'	Stadium: Roots Hall; Attendance: 4,805; Referee: Simon Hooper

10 September 2011 7	Northampton Town	0–0	Torquay United	Northampton
15:00 BST		Report		Stadium: Sixfields Stadium; Attendance: 4,036; Referee: Bobby Madley

13 September 2011 8	Wimbledon	0–3	Northampton Town	Kingston upon Thames
19:45 BST		Report	A.Akinfenwa 17' (pen.); M.Jacobs 73', 77'	Stadium: Kingsmeadow; Attendance: 4,271; Referee: James Adcock

19 September 2011 9	Macclesfield Town	3–1	Northampton Town	Macclesfield
15:00 BST	B.Tomlinson 36', 84'; C.Daniel 88'	Report	M.Jackson 44'	Stadium: Moss Rose; Attendance: 2,033; Referee: Mark Haywood

24 September 2011 10	Northampton Town	2–1	Dagenham & Redbridge	Northampton
15:00 BST	A.Davies 16'; A.Akinfenwa 59'	Report	O.Lee 90'	Stadium: Sixfields Stadium; Attendance: 4,274; Referee: Jock Waugh

1 October 2011 11	Barnet	1–2	Northampton Town	High Barnet
15:00 BST	R.Holmes 17'	Report	A.Davies 51'; B.Tozer 89'	Stadium: Underhill Stadium; Attendance: 2,304; Referee: Andy D' Urso

8 October 2011 12	Northampton Town	0–1	Crawley Town	Northampton
12:45 BST		Report	M.Tubbs 23'	Stadium: Sixfields Stadium; Attendance: 4,803; Referee: Graham Scott

14 October 2011 13	Port Vale	3–0	Northampton Town	Burslem
19:45 BST	T.Pope 5'; A.Griffith 19'; J.McCombe 26'	Report		Stadium: Vale Park; Attendance: 5,082; Referee: Andy Madley

22 October 2011 14	Bradford City	2–1	Northampton Town	Bradford
15:00 BST	C.Fagan 64' (pen.); J.Hanson 69'	Report	M.Jacobs 58'	Stadium: Valley Parade; Attendance: 9,925; Referee: Steven Rushton

25 October 2011 15	Northampton Town	1–3	Hereford United	Northampton
19:45 BST	S.Berahino 63'	Report	N.Elder 13'; S.Leslie 20'; H.Pell 71'	Stadium: Sixfields Stadium; Attendance: 3,643; Referee: Nigel Miller

29 October 2011 16	Northampton Town	1–1	Rotherham United	Northampton
15:00 BST	C.Logan 24' (o.g.)	Report	G.Evans 2'	Stadium: Sixfields Stadium; Attendance: 4,182; Referee: Rob Lewis

5 November 2011 17	Gillingham	4–3	Northampton Town	Gillingham
15:00 GMT	J.Kuffour 11', 30', 45+1' (pen.); D.Kedwell 90+1' (pen.)	Report	S.Berahino 35', 60'; K.Langmead 54'	Stadium: Priestfield Stadium; Attendance: 4,704; Referee: Carl Berry

19 November 2011 18	Northampton Town	2–7	Shrewsbury Town	Northampton
15:00 GMT	B.Tozer 49'; A.Akinfenwa 85'	Report	M.Wright 18', 40'; T.Gornell 44'; M.Morgan 82'; J.Collins 88'; J.Jacobson 90+4'; K.Langmead 90+6' (o.g.)	Stadium: Sixfields Stadium; Attendance: 5,039; Referee: David Webb

26 November 2011 19	Plymouth Argyle	4–1	Northampton Town	Plymouth
15:00 GMT	S.Walton 8' (pen.); N.Chadwick 9'; W.Atkinson 17'; A.Hemmings 44'	Report	A.Akinfenwa 90+3'	Stadium: Home Park; Attendance: 5,762; Referee: Oliver Langford

10 December 2011 20	Northampton Town	1–1	Crewe Alexandra	Northampton
15:00 GMT	A.Akinfenwa 16'	Report	B.Moore 61'	Stadium: Sixfields Stadium; Attendance: 4,579; Referee: Steve Tanner

17 December 2011 21	Oxford United	2–0	Northampton Town	Oxford
15:00 GMT	T.Craddock 50'; D.Smalley 87'	Report		Stadium: Kassam Stadium; Attendance: 7,517; Referee: Tony Bates

26 December 2011 22	Northampton Town	2–3	Burton Albion	Northampton
15:00 GMT	S.Berahino 1'; M.Jacobs 12' (pen.)	Report	C.Taylor 2'; C.Palmer 61'; J.Richards 88' (pen.)	Stadium: Sixfields Stadium; Attendance: 5,044; Referee: Kevin Wright

31 December 2011 23	Northampton Town	1–2	Swindon Town	Northampton
15:00 GMT	M.Jacobs 22' (pen.)	Report	A.Connell 66'; A.McCormack 90'	Stadium: Sixfields Stadium; Attendance: 5,808; Referee: Michael Jones

2 January 2012 24	Shrewsbury Town	1–1	Northampton Town	Shrewsbury
15:00 GMT	M.Richards 34'	Report	S.Berahino 22'	Stadium: New Meadow; Attendance: 6,045; Referee: Graham Salisbury

7 January 2012 25	Morecambe	1–2	Northampton Town	Morecambe
15:00 GMT	K.Ellison 81'	Report	J.Johnson 21'; A.Asante 52'	Stadium: Globe Arena; Attendance: 1,879; Referee: Mark Heywood

14 January 2012 26	Northampton Town	2–5	Southend United	Northampton
15:00 GMT	J.Johnson 10'; S.Berahino 43'	Report	D.Martin 41'; L.Dickinson 65', 85'; B.Mohsni 81', 90'	Stadium: Sixfields Stadium; Attendance: 5,255; Referee: Gary Sutton

21 January 2012 27	Northampton Town	1–2	Barnet	Northampton
15:00 GMT	A.Akinfenwa 8'	Report	M.Byrne 48'; R.Holmes 69'	Stadium: Sixfields Stadium; Attendance: 4,561; Referee: Jock Waugh

28 January 2012 28	Torquay United	1–0	Northampton Town	Torquay
15:00 GMT	M.Ellis 75'	Report		Stadium: Plainmoor; Attendance: 2,719; Referee: James Linington

14 February 2012 29	Northampton Town	1–0	AFC Wimbledon	Northampton
19:45 GMT	L.Guttridge 79'	Report		Stadium: Sixfields Stadium; Attendance: 4,072; Referee: Andy D' Urso

21 February 2012 30	Northampton Town	3–2	Macclesfield Town	Northampton
15:00 GMT	M.Jacobs 26'; L.Guttridge 45'; A.Akinfenwa 52'	Report	G.Donnelly 17'; B.Tomlinson 85'	Stadium: Sixfields Stadium; Attendance: 4,529; Referee: Graham Scott

25 February 2012 31	Northampton Town	1–2	Port Vale	Northampton
15:00 GMT	A.Akinfenwa 81'	Report	J.McCombe 4'; S.Rigg 58'	Stadium: Sixfields Stadium; Attendance: 5,803; Referee: Gavin Ward

3 March 2012 32	Cheltenham Town	2–2	Northampton Town	Cheltenham
15:00 GMT	D.Duffy 76' (pen.), 90'	Report	B.Tozer 20'; A.Akinfenwa 35'	Stadium: Whaddon Road; Attendance: 3,503; Referee: Darren Sheldrake

6 March 2012 33	Northampton Town	3–2	Bristol Rovers	Northampton
19:45 GMT	A.Akinfenwa 1', 9'; K.Langmead 20'	Report	C.Stanley 66'; L.Brown 86' (pen.)	Stadium: Sixfields Stadium; Attendance: 4,028; Referee: Brendan Malone

10 March 2012 34	Northampton Town	3–1	Aldershot Town	Northampton
15:00 GMT	K.Langmead 19'; A.Akinfenwa 40', 57' (pen.)	Report	D.Hylton 90'	Stadium: Sixfields Stadium; Attendance: 5,071; Referee: Andy Haines

13 March 2012 35	Dagenham & Redbridge	0–1	Northampton Town	Dagenham, London
15:00 GMT		Report	T.Silva 62'	Stadium: Victoria Road; Attendance: 2,164; Referee: Paul Tierney

17 March 2012 36	Accrington Stanley	2–1	Northampton Town	Accrington
15:00 GMT	J.Devitt 42'; C.Lindfield 87'	Report	B.Williams 69'	Stadium: Crown Ground; Attendance: 1,803; Referee: Michael Naylor

20 March 2012 37	Burton Albion	0–1	Northampton Town	Burton-upon-Trent
19:45 GMT		Report	K.Langmead 90'	Stadium: Pirelli Stadium; Attendance: 2,692; Referee: Steven Rushton

24 March 2012 38	Northampton Town	0–0	Plymouth Argyle	Northampton
15:00 GMT		Report		Stadium: Sixfields Stadium; Attendance: 6,718; Referee: David Phillips

31 March 2012 39	Crewe Alexandra	1–1	Northampton Town	Crewe
15:00 GMT	L.Murphy 17'	Report	A.Akinfenwa 59'	Stadium: Gresty Road; Attendance: 4,893; Referee: Pat Miller

6 April 2012 40	Northampton Town	2–1	Oxford United	Northampton
19:45 BST	L.Guttridge 1'; B.Williams 90'	Report	C.Montaño 50'	Stadium: Sixfields Stadium; Attendance: 6,860; Referee: Mark Brown

9 April 2012 41	Swindon Town	1–0	Northampton Town	Swindon
15:00 BST	L.Holmes 52'	Report		Stadium: County Ground; Attendance: 8,745; Referee: Stuart Attwell

14 April 2012 42	Northampton Town	1–3	Bradford City	Northampton
15:00 BST	C.Carlisle 53'	Report	N.Wells 11', 39', 54'	Stadium: Sixfields Stadium; Attendance: 5,060; Referee: Oliver Langford

17 April 2012 43	Crawley Town	3–1	Northampton Town	Crawley
19:45 BST	S.Neilson 14'; B.Clarke 22'; N.Kitson 39' (o.g.)	Report	B.Williams 65'	Stadium: Broadfield Stadium; Attendance: 2,861; Referee: Chris Sarginson

21 April 2012 44	Hereford United	0–0	Northampton Town	Hereford
15:00 BST		Report		Stadium: Edgar Street; Attendance: 2,970; Referee: James Linington

28 April 2012 45	Northampton Town	1–1	Gillingham	Northampton
15:00 BST	L.Wilson 41'	Report	J.Kuffour 54'	Stadium: Sixfields Stadium; Attendance: 5,832; Referee: Keith Stroud

5 May 2012 46	Rotherham Town	1–1	Northampton Town	Rotherham
15:00 BST	A.Revell 31'	Report	A.Akinfenwa 90+4'	Stadium: Don Valley Stadium; Attendance: 4,729; Referee: Carl Boyeson

=== FA Cup ===
12 November 2011 First round	Luton Town	1–0	Northampton Town	Luton
15:00 GMT	A.Watkins 80'	Report		Stadium: Kenilworth Road; Attendance: 4,799; Referee: Andy D'Urso

=== League Cup ===
9 August 2011 First round	Ipswich Town	1–2	Northampton Town	Ipswich
19:45 BST	J.Emmanuel-Thomas 11'	Report	B.Tozer 39'; P.Turnbull 54'	Stadium: Portman Road; Attendance: 9,401; Referee: Michael Naylor

23 August 2011 Second round	Northampton Town	0–4	Wolverhampton Wanderers	Northampton
19:45 BST		Report	S.Ebanks-Blake 31', 77'; N.Milijaš 33'; S.Vokes 88'	Stadium: Sixfields Stadium; Attendance: 5,512; Referee: Carl Boyeson

=== Leaue Trophy ===
30 August 2011 First round	Northampton Town	1–2	Huddersfield Town	Northampton
19:45 BST	M.Jacobs 41'	Report	D.McDermott 39'; L.Novak 82'	Stadium: Sixfields Stadium; Attendance: 1,776; Referee: Darren Deadman

=== Appearances, goals and cards ===
No.	Pos	Player	League Two			FA Cup			League Cup			League Trophy			Total			Discipline	
No.	Pos	Player	Starts	Sub	Goals	Starts	Sub	Goals	Starts	Sub	Goals	Starts	Sub	Goals	Starts	Sub	Goals	Yellow card	Red card
1	GK	Shane Higgs	3	–	–	–	–	–	–	–	–	–	–	–	3	–	–	–	–
2	RM	Lewis Young	20	9	–	1	–	–	1	1	–	1	–	–	23	10	–	4	–
3	LB	Anthony Charles	5	4	–	–	–	–	–	–	–	–	–	–	5	4	–	1	–
4	RB	Jason Crowe	11	–	–	1	–	–	–	–	–	–	–	–	12	–	–	1	–
5	U	Ben Tozer	42	3	3	1	–	–	2	–	1	1	–	–	46	3	4	6	–
6	CB	Byron Webster	8	5	–	–	–	–	2	–	–	1	–	–	11	5	–	1	–
7	RM	Arron Davies	15	–	4	–	1	–	2	–	–	1	–	–	18	1	4	1	–
8	ST	Jake Robinson	15	17	–	–	–	–	2	–	–	–	–	–	17	17	–	1	–
9	ST	Brett Williams	8	10	3	–	–	–	–	–	–	–	–	–	8	10	3	2	–
10	ST	Adebayo Akinfenwa	33	6	18	1	–	–	1	–	–	1	–	–	36	6	18	7	–
11	U	Andy Holt	5	4	–	–	1	–	–	–	–	–	–	–	5	5	–	–	–
12	CM	Nathaniel Wedderburn	1	1	–	–	–	–	–	–	–	–	–	–	1	1	–	–	–
13	GK	Neal Kitson	8	–	–	–	–	–	–	–	–	–	–	–	8	–	–	–	–
14	RB	John Johnson	43	2	2	1	–	–	1	–	–	1	–	–	46	2	2	10	1
15	CM	Paul Turnbull	9	5	–	–	1	–	2	–	1	1	–	–	12	6	1	1	–
16	RB	Seth Nana Twumasi	4	1	–	–	–	–	1	–	–	–	–	–	5	1	–	–	–
17	W	Michael Jacobs	45	1	6	1	–	–	1	1	–	1	–	1	48	2	7	5	–
20	RM	Ryan Gilligan	–	2	–	–	–	–	–	–	–	–	–	–	–	2	–	–	–
22	CM	Luke Guttridge	19	–	3	–	–	–	1	–	–	–	–	–	19	–	3	3	–
23	ST	Lewis Wilson	2	1	1	–	–	–	–	–	–	–	–	–	2	1	1	–	–
24	W	Toni Silva	12	3	1	–	–	–	–	–	–	–	–	–	12	3	1	–	–
25	CB	Clarke Carlisle	18	–	1	–	–	–	–	–	–	–	–	–	18	–	1	5	–
26	GK	Freddy Hall	2	1	–	–	–	–	–	–	–	–	–	–	2	1	–	–	–
27	CM	Ben Harding	19	–	–	–	–	–	–	–	–	–	–	–	19	–	–	1	–
28	CB	Kelvin Langmead	39	2	4	1	–	–	1	1	–	1	–	–	42	3	4	4	1
29	LB	Blair Adams	21	1	–	–	–	–	–	–	–	–	–	–	21	1	–	2	–
30	GK	Dean Snedker	–	–	–	–	–	–	–	–	–	–	–	–	–	–	–	–	–
31	CM	Lewis Hornby	–	–	–	–	–	–	–	–	–	–	–	–	–	–	–	–	–
Players who left before season end:
18	ST	Tadhg Purcell	–	–	–	–	–	–	–	–	–	–	–	–	–	–	–	–	–
21	CM	Michael Built	–	–	–	–	–	–	–	–	–	–	–	–	–	–	–	–	–
Players who left before season end:
1	GK	Sam Walker	21	–	–	1	–	–	2	–	–	1	–	–	25	–	–	–	–
3	LB	Ashley Corker	9	7	–	–	–	–	2	–	–	–	1	–	11	8	–	4	–
4	CM	Kevin Thornton	–	2	–	–	–	–	–	–	–	–	–	–	–	2	–	1	–
4	CM	George Baldock	4	1	–	–	–	–	–	–	–	–	–	–	4	1	–	2	–
9	ST	Saido Berahino	14	–	6	1	–	–	–	–	–	–	–	–	15	–	6	1	–
13	GK	Paul Walker	–	–	–	–	–	–	–	–	–	–	–	–	–	–	–	–	–
19	CM	Greg Kaziboni	–	3	–	–	–	–	–	–	–	–	–	–	–	3	–	–	–
4	CM	Nick McKoy	5	4	–	–	–	–	–	2	–	1	–	–	6	6	–	2	2
24	ST	Lumbardh Salihu	–	1	–	–	–	–	–	1	–	–	–	–	–	2	–	–	–
25	ST	Akwasi Asante	3	1	1	–	–	–	–	–	–	–	–	–	3	1	1	1	–
25	CB	Ashley Westwood	14	3	1	1	–	–	1	–	–	–	1	–	16	4	1	4	–
27	ST	Bas Savage	3	5	–	–	–	–	1	–	–	–	1	–	4	6	–	1	–
29	LB	Chris Arthur	5	2	–	1	–	–	–	–	–	–	–	–	6	2	–	2	–
31	CM	Derek Niven	4	–	–	–	–	–	–	–	–	–	–	–	4	–	–	1	–
32	GK	Chris Weale	3	–	–	–	–	–	–	–	–	–	–	–	3	–	–	–	–
33	GK	Matt Duke	9	–	–	–	–	–	–	–	–	–	–	–	9	–	–	–	–

== Transfers ==
Players transferred in
Date	Pos.	Name	From	Fee	Ref.
17 May 2011	DF	(England) Byron Webster	(England) Doncaster Rovers	Free Transfer	
25 May 2011	FW	(England) Adebayo Akinfenwa	(England) Gillingham	Free Transfer	
31 May 2011	DF	(England) Seth Nana Twumasi	(England) Peterborough United	Free Transfer	
8 June 2011	FW	(England) Jake Robinson	(England) Shrewsbury Town	Free Transfer	
23 June 2011	DF	(England) Ben Tozer	(England) Newcastle United	Free Transfer	
29 June 2011	MF	(England) Paul Turnbull	(England) Stockport County	Free Transfer	
30 June 2011	MF	(England) Arron Davies	(England) Peterborough United	Free Transfer	
7 July 2011	GK	(Bermuda) Freddy Hall	Free agent	Free Transfer	
7 July 2011	MF	(England) Nick McKoy	Free agent	Free Transfer	
7 July 2011	MF	(England) Lewis Young	Free agent	Free Transfer	
11 July 2011	DF	(England) Ashley Corker	Free agent	Free Transfer	
28 July 2011	MF	(Austria) Marin Pozgain		Free Transfer	
28 July 2011	FW	(Austria) Lumbardh Salihu		Free Transfer	
4 August 2011	DF	(England) Ashley Westwood	Free agent	Non Contract	
4 August 2011	FW	(England) Bas Savage	Free agent	Non Contract	
31 January 2012	DF	(England) Ben Harding	(England) Wycombe Wanderers	Free Transfer	
Players transferred out
Date	Pos.	Name	To	Fee	Ref.
16 May 2011	FW	(Spain) Guillem Bauza	(England) Exeter City	Free (Rejected Contract)	
5 July 2011	GK	(England) Chris Dunn	(England) Coventry City	Tribunal	
12 July 2011	FW	(Northern Ireland) Billy McKay	(Scotland) Inverness Caledonian Thistle	Free	
31 August 2011	FW	(England) Shaun Harrad	(England) Bury	Undisclosed	
Players loaned in
Date from	Pos.	Name	From	Date to	Ref.
11 July 2011	GK	(England) Sam Walker	(England) Chelsea	31 May 2012	
9 August 2011	DF	(England) Kelvin Langmead	(England) Peterborough United	9 September 2011	
13 September 2011	FW	(England) Marlon Jackson	(England) Bristol City	19 November 2011	
20 October 2011	FW	(England) Saido Berahino	(England) West Bromwich Albion	2 February 2012	
31 January 2012	DF	(England) Clarke Carlisle	(England) Burnley	31 May 2012	
14 February 2012	MF	(Portugal) Toni Silva	(England) Liverpool	13 March 2012	
Players loaned out
Date from	Pos.	Name	To	Date to	Ref.
18 August 2011	MF	(England) Ryan Gilligan	(Wales) Newport County	January 2012	
23 February 2012	FW	(Republic of Ireland) Tadhg Purcell	(Republic of Ireland) Cork City	30 June 2012	
27 March 2012	MF	(New Zealand) Michael Built	(England) Bedford Town	May 2012	
Players released
Date	Pos.	Name	Subsequent club	Join date	Ref.
30 June 2011	DF	(England) Dean Beckwith	(England) Luton Town	1 July 2011	
30 June 2011	MF	(England) Liam Davis	(England) Oxford United	4 August 2011	
30 June 2011	DF	(England) Marcus Hall	Unattached		
30 June 2011	FW	(United States) Seb Harris	(England) Nuneaton Town	1 July 2011	
30 June 2011	FW	(England) Courtney Herbert	(England) Corby Town	1 July 2011	
30 June 2011	FW	(Cyprus) Alex Konstantinou	(England) Belper Town		
30 June 2011	MF	(France) Francis Laurent	(England) Lincoln City	1 July 2011	
30 June 2011	FW	(England) Leon McKenzie	(England) Kettering Town		
30 June 2011	MF	(Ghana) Abdul Osman	(Cyprus) Kerkyra		
30 June 2011	DF	(England) Paul Rodgers	(Wales) Newport County	1 August 2011	
1 September 2011	MF	(Republic of Ireland) Kevin Thornton	(England) Nuneaton Town		
