= Snedker =

Surname list

Snedker is a surname. Notable people with the surname include:

- Dean Snedker (born 1994), English footballer
- James Snedker (1911–1981), Canadian politician in Saskatchewan
