= Ivan Toney =

English footballer (born 1996)

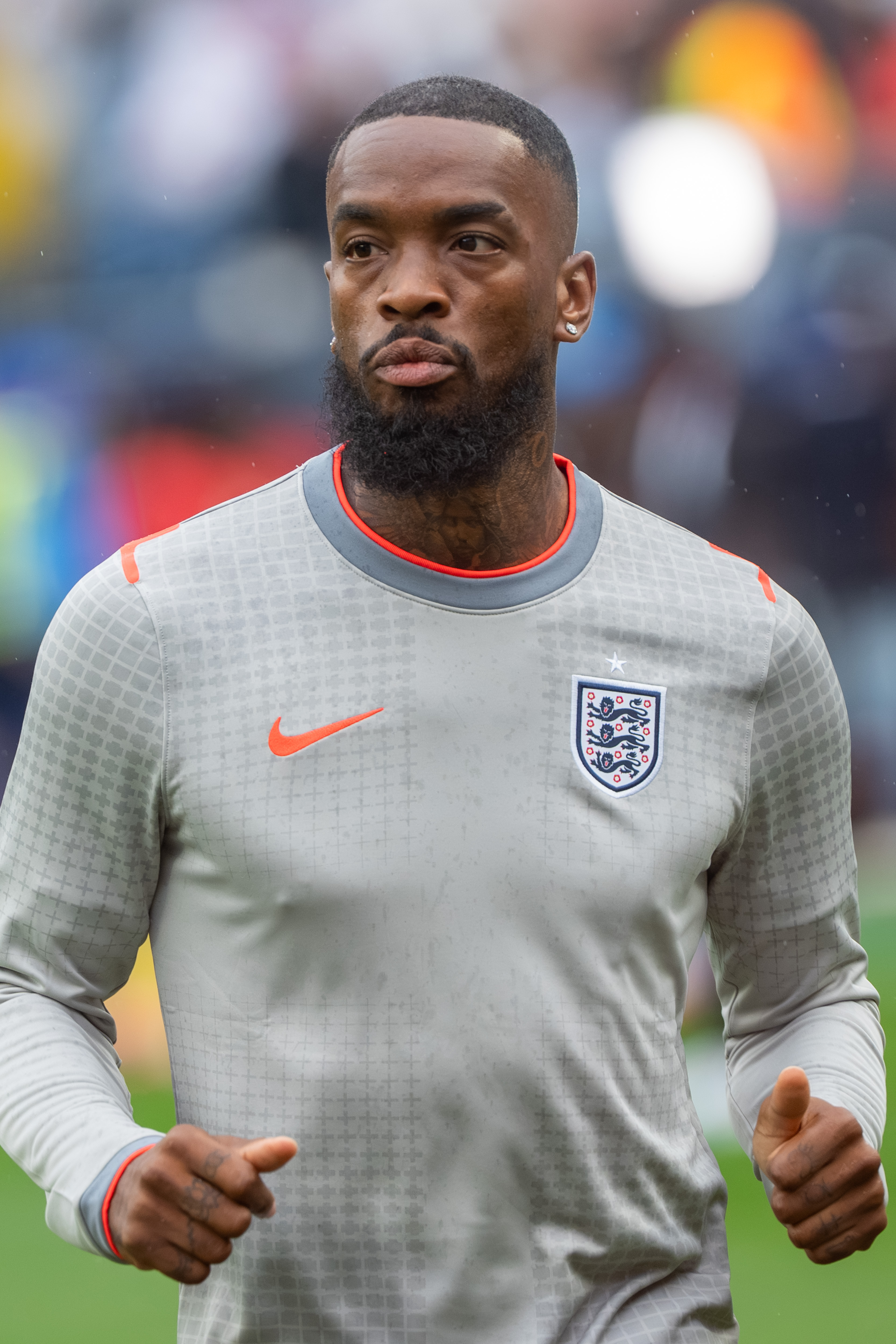
- Toney with England in 2026

Personal information
- Full name: Ivan Benjamin Elijah Toney
- Date of birth: 16 March 1996 (age 30)
- Place of birth: Northampton, England
- Height: 6 ft 1 in (1.85 m)
- Position: Striker

Team information
- Current team: Al-Ahli
- Number: 17

Youth career
- –2012: Northampton Town

Senior career*
Years	Team	Apps	(Gls)
2012–2015	Northampton Town	53	(11)
2015–2018	Newcastle United	2	(0)
2015	→ Barnsley (loan)	6	(1)
2016	→ Barnsley (loan)	9	(0)
2016–2017	→ Shrewsbury Town (loan)	19	(6)
2017	→ Scunthorpe United (loan)	15	(6)
2017–2018	→ Wigan Athletic (loan)	24	(4)
2018	→ Scunthorpe United (loan)	16	(8)
2018–2020	Peterborough United	76	(40)
2020–2024	Brentford	128	(67)
2024–	Al-Ahli	72	(69)

International career^{‡}
2023–	England	10	(1)
Medal record
Men's football
Representing England
FIFA World Cup
Third place	2026 Canada–Mexico–US
UEFA European Championship
Runner-up	2024 Germany
- * Club domestic league appearances and goals as of 20:32, 20 November 2026 (UTC) ‡ National team caps and goals as of 23:00, 18 July 2026 (UTC)

Ivan Benjamin Elijah Toney (born 16 March 1996) is an English professional footballer who plays as a striker for Saudi Pro League club Al-Ahli and the England national team.

Toney became the youngest player to represent Northampton Town when he made his first-team debut in 2012. He scored 13 goals in 60 matches in all competitions before joining Newcastle United in 2015. In his first season at Newcastle, he had two successive loan spells with Barnsley, winning the 2015–16 Football League Trophy and the 2016 League One play-offs. He spent the next two years on loan in League One with Shrewsbury Town, Scunthorpe United, and Wigan Athletic.

In 2018, Toney joined Peterborough United permanently for an undisclosed fee, where he was named both League One top scorer and Player of the Season in 2019–20. He then signed for Brentford, where his record-setting 31 goals scored during the 2020–21 season helped the club earn promotion to the Premier League. In May 2023, after his 20 goals helped Brentford to a top-half finish, he was found guilty of 232 breaches of the Football Association's betting rules and banned from football for eight months, until 17 January 2024.

Toney received his first call-up for the England national team in 2022 before making his debut in 2023. He was then included in the squads for UEFA Euro 2024 and the 2026 FIFA World Cup.

== Early life ==
Ivan Benjamin Elijah Toney was born on 16 March 1996 in Northampton, Northamptonshire. He is of Vincentian descent through his father, and Jamaican through his mother.

== Club career ==
=== Northampton Town ===
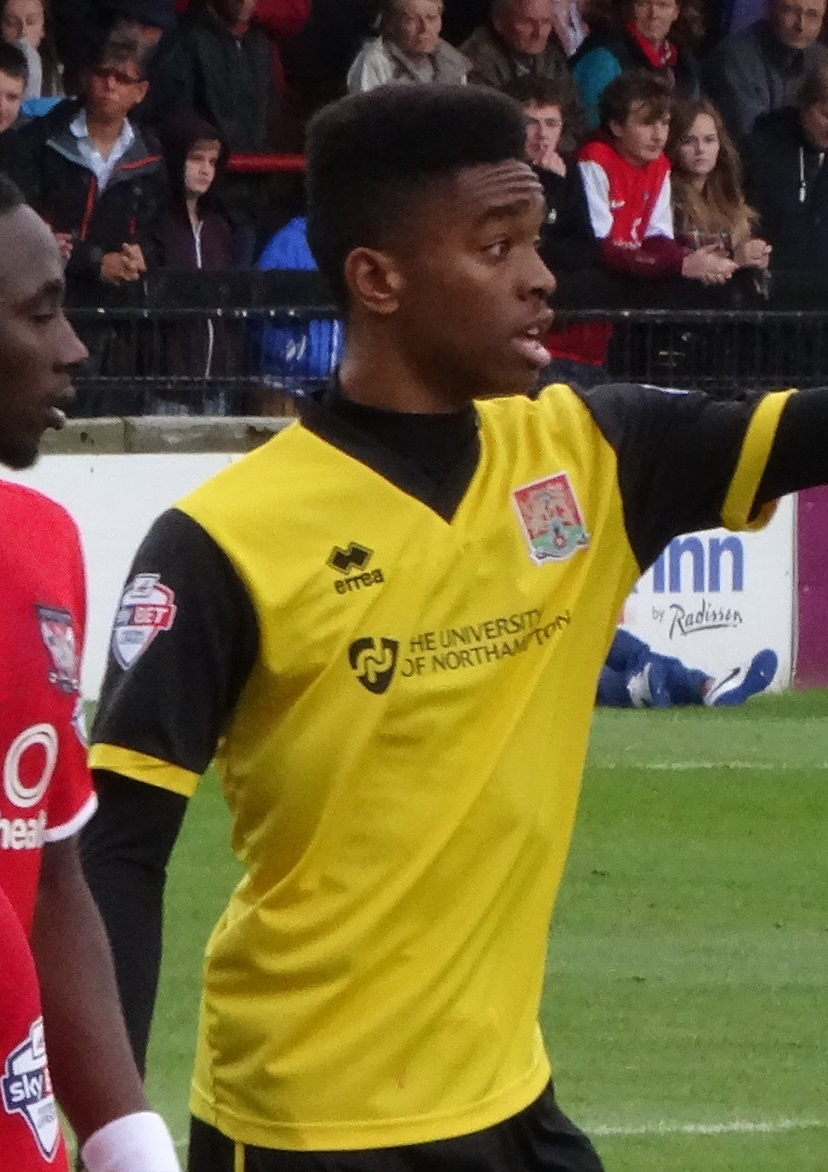
Toney playing for Northampton Town in 2014

Toney began his career at his hometown club Northampton Town. He made his first-team debut on 13 November 2012, in a 3–3 draw in the FA Cup first round away to Bradford City; he came on at the end of regulation time in place of Lewis Wilson as his team eventually lost 4–2 in a penalty shoot-out.

At 16 years old he became the youngest first-team player in the club's history. The following day, he scored four goals in the FA Youth Cup, in a 5–0 win over York City. His only other appearance in a matchday squad that season was on 17 November, remaining unused in a 3–1 League Two win at home to Wycombe Wanderers.

Toney made his first start on 28 September 2013 in a goalless home draw against Morecambe, making way for Ben Tozer after 74 minutes. His first professional goals came on 26 April 2014, scoring two in the first half of a 3–0 victory away to Dagenham & Redbridge, the latter a bicycle kick. On 3 May, he scored a header as Northampton defeated Oxford United 3–1 at home to avoid relegation to the Conference Premier on the final day of the season.

On 12 August 2014, Toney scored a header in a 3–2 win away to Championship team Wolverhampton Wanderers in the first round of the League Cup. His first goals of the league season arrived on 20 September; on as a substitute for Lawson D'Ath, he scored twice in a home contest against Accrington Stanley but his team nonetheless lost 5–4. A week later, his header was the only goal in victory away to Morecambe. Toney received the first red card of his career on 26 December in a 3–2 home defeat to Bury, being dismissed for fighting with visiting defender Hayden White. In November 2014, Toney was close to a transfer to Wolverhampton Wanderers, which collapsed due to an undisclosed medical issue.

=== Newcastle United ===
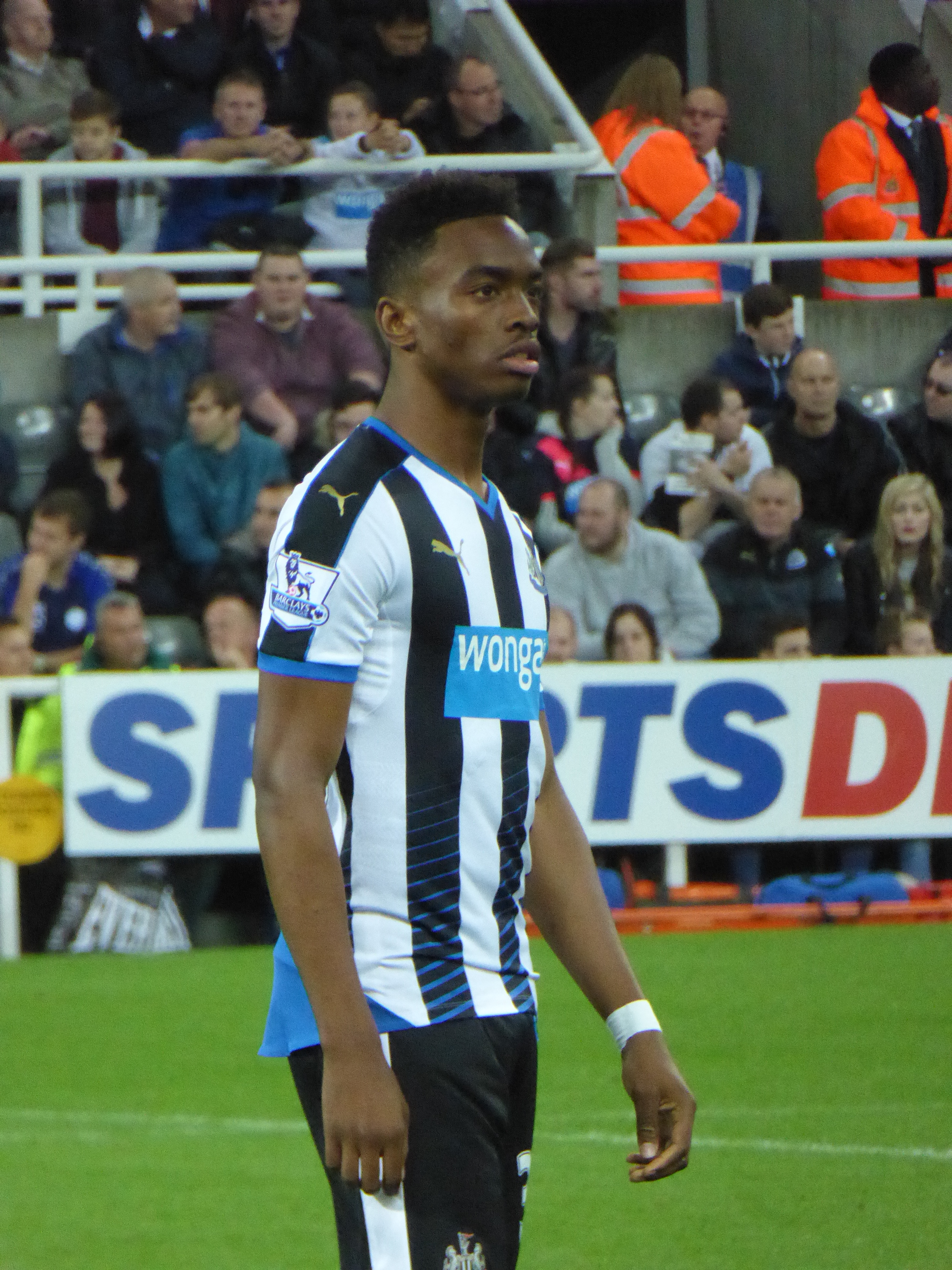
Toney playing for Newcastle United in 2015

After 13 goals in 60 appearances for Northampton across all competitions, Toney signed for Premier League club Newcastle United on 6 August 2015 on a long-term contract for an undisclosed fee. He made his debut on 25 August in the second round of the League Cup, replacing Massadio Haïdara for the final 12 minutes of a 4–1 home win over his former team. On 26 September, he played his first league match for Newcastle, as an 85th-minute substitute for Aleksandar Mitrović in a 2–2 home draw against Chelsea.

==== Loan spells ====
On 9 November 2015, Toney joined League One club Barnsley on a 28-day youth loan. He made his debut the next day in the Northern quarter-finals of the Football League Trophy, starting in a 2–1 home win over York. On 5 December, he scored his first goal for Barnsley away to Wigan Athletic in the Trophy's next round, a header in a 2–2 draw, and also converted his attempt as they won in the subsequent penalty shoot-out. A week later, he scored his first league goal for the club, deciding a 3–2 win away to Colchester United with a header from Marley Watkins' cross.

On 24 March 2016, Toney returned to Barnsley on loan for the remainder of the season. On 3 April, in the 2016 Football League Trophy Final against Oxford United at Wembley Stadium, he came on as a 65th-minute substitute for top scorer Sam Winnall. He took a shot which rebounded for Ashley Fletcher to give Barnsley a 2–1 lead, and they eventually won 3–2. Barnsley won promotion with a 3–1 victory over Millwall at the same ground on 29 May; Toney replaced Fletcher for the last nine minutes.

The following season, Toney joined League One club Shrewsbury Town on 8 August 2016 on a half-season loan. He scored his first goal for the club, converting a penalty after being fouled by Charles Dunne, in a 3–2 win away to Oldham Athletic on 3 September, and added another a week later to equalise in a 1–1 draw away to Bury. On 24 September, he was sent off in a 1–1 draw away to AFC Wimbledon for a late challenge on opposition goalkeeper James Shea.

Having scored seven goals in 26 appearances across all competitions for Shrewsbury, Toney was loaned to fellow League One club Scunthorpe United on 12 January 2017 for the remainder of the 2016–17 season. Two days later he made his debut for the Iron, replacing Kevin van Veen for the final ten minutes of a 2–1 win on his return to Northampton. On 28 January, he made a first start and scored in a 3–2 home win over Port Vale, putting Scunthorpe in first place.

On 2 August 2017, Toney returned to League One, joining Wigan Athletic for the upcoming season. He made his debut three days later, starting as they began the campaign with a 1–0 win away to Milton Keynes Dons. His first goal for his new team came on 19 August, opening a 2–0 win away to Oldham Athletic. However, his deal was cut short, as he returned to Newcastle on 10 January 2018.

Toney re-signed on loan for Scunthorpe United on 11 January 2018. He scored his first goal back in a Scunthorpe shirt on 3 February 2018, netting the winner in a 3–2 away victory over Fleetwood Town.

=== Peterborough United ===
Toney signed for League One club Peterborough United on 9 August 2018 on a long-term contract for an undisclosed fee, reported by some sources as £650,000. He made his debut two days later in a 4–1 win at Rochdale as a 72nd-minute substitute for two-goal Jason Cummings. On 8 September, coming on for the same player, he scored his first goal for the Posh to win 3–2 at Southend United.

He scored a hat-trick on 11 December in a 4–4 draw in the second round replay of the FA Cup away to Bradford City – starting with a free kick from near the halfway line – but missed in the subsequent penalty shootout although his team won nonetheless. Eighteen days later he recorded another treble in a 4–0 win at Accrington Stanley. On 23 February 2019, Toney was sent off in the first half-hour of a 2–1 home loss to former team Shrewsbury, for handling the ball on the goal line.

Toney began the 2019–20 season with seven goals in the first seven league games, concluding with a hat-trick in a 6–0 home win over Rochdale on 14 September. The following month, he asked a chant sung by Peterborough fans about the size of his genitalia to be changed to make it more family-friendly.

Toney scored nine times in his last seven games before the season was abandoned in March 2020 due to the COVID-19 pandemic. He was voted Player of the Season at the EFL Awards.

=== Brentford ===
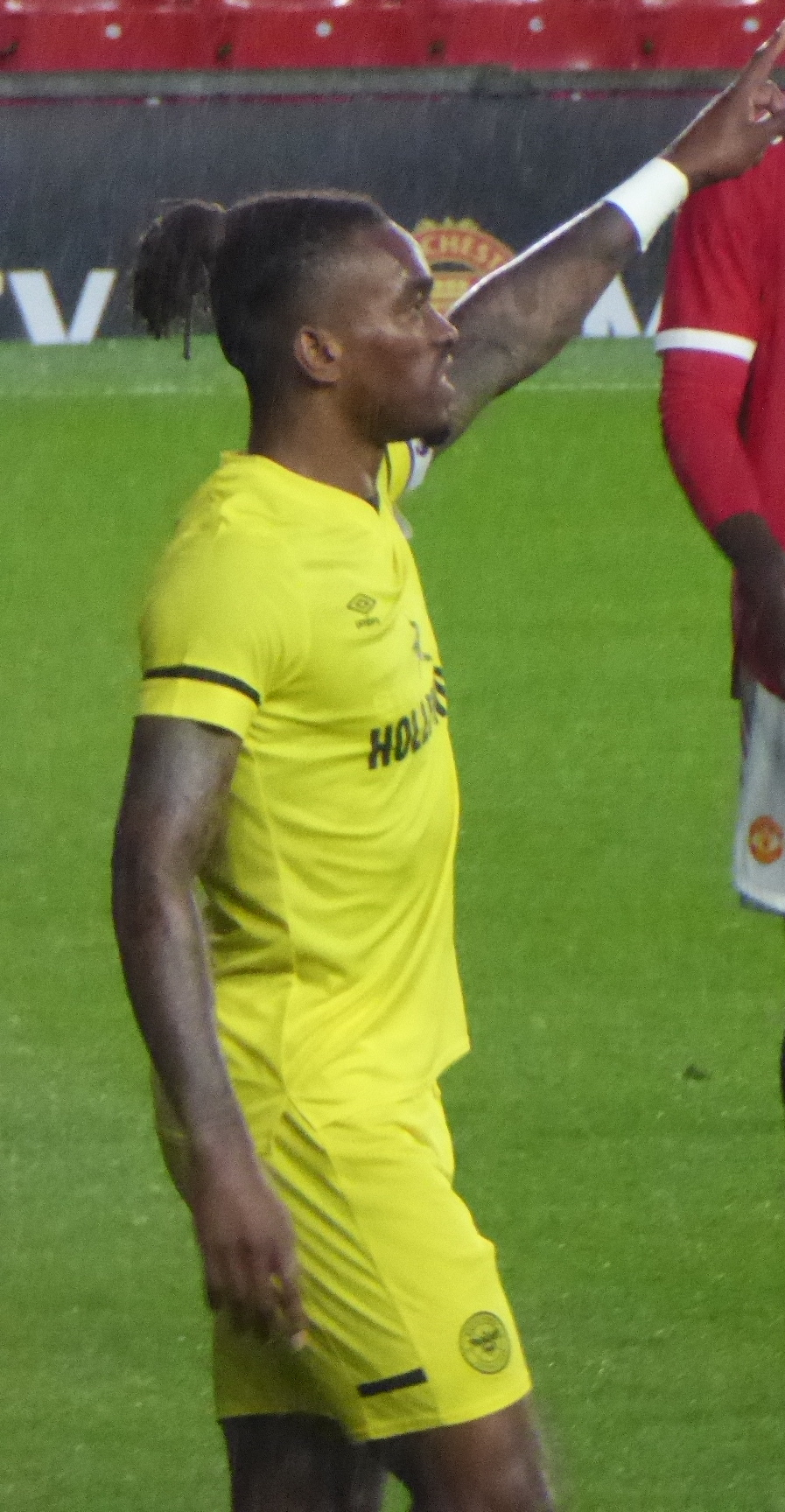
Toney playing for Brentford in 2021

On 31 August 2020, Toney completed a medical and signed for Championship club Brentford on a five-year deal. The fee was reported to be in the region of £5 million and around £10 million with add-ons, Peterborough's record transfer fee. Among the other clubs to want him was Premier League side Tottenham Hotspur, but only as a back-up to Harry Kane.

He scored his first goal for Brentford, a penalty, in a 1–1 draw with Millwall on 26 September; in each of his next three games, he scored twice. On 20 January 2021, Toney assisted the only goal of a home win over Luton Town, before being dismissed in added time for an altercation with Tom Lockyer. Ten days later, he contributed a hat-trick to a 7–2 win over Wycombe Wanderers, also at the Brentford Community Stadium. In April, he was nominated for the Championship Player of the Season.

On 8 May 2021, Toney scored his 31st league goal of the season against Bristol City, setting a new Championship record for most goals scored in a single season. Three weeks later, he scored in a 2–0 win over Swansea City in the 2021 Championship play-off final, which saw Brentford promoted to the Premier League.

While at Brentford, the club stopped taking a knee against racism; Toney said that players were being "used as puppets" to make the gesture while society did not change. He also faced online racist abuse over the season. Following Brentford's decision to take the knee for the 2021–22 Premier League season alongside the other 19 clubs, Toney said he would not join his colleagues and would continue to stand.

On 13 August 2021, Toney started and played the full game in Brentford's first Premier League match, where they won 2–0 over Arsenal. On 5 March 2022, Toney scored Brentford's first Premier League hat-trick in a vital 3–1 away victory over Norwich City.

On 3 September 2022, Toney scored his second Premier League hat-trick in a 5–2 home victory over Leeds United; his first goal was his 50th for the club, while the second and third goals were his first from outside the box since joining Brentford. With Brentford, Toney has emerged as an almost flawless penalty-taker, netting every penalty taken for the club until April 2023.

On 14 March 2023, a man who racially abused Toney on social media became the first person to be banned from every English stadium for three years. On 17 May, Toney's season was ended prematurely after playing 33 league matches and scoring 20 goals, as he received an eight month ban from football from the FA for numerous breaches of their player betting rules.

On 20 January 2024, in his first game for Brentford since his suspension, Toney scored directly from a free kick in a 3–2 victory over Nottingham Forest.

=== Al Ahli ===
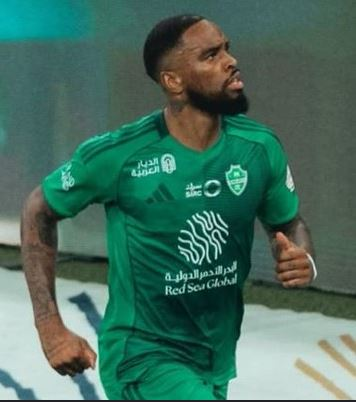
Toney playing for Al-Ahli in 2026

On 30 August 2024, it was announced that Toney had completed a transfer to Saudi Pro League club Al-Ahli, by signing a contract until 2028 for a reported fee of £40m. In his debut season, he won the AFC Champions League Elite with his club, securing their first-ever title in the competition. He finished as his club's top scorer with 23 league goals, ranking second overall behind Cristiano Ronaldo. The following season, he scored in a 2–1 Champions League semi-final victory over Vissel Kobe, helping secure his club's place in a consecutive final.

== International career ==
In March 2021, it was reported that Toney would be called up to the Jamaican national team, as part of a plan by the Jamaica Football Federation to purposely target a number of English-born players for call ups to increase the nation's chances of qualifying for the 2022 FIFA World Cup. Jamaica Football Federation president Michael Ricketts claimed that Toney was in the process of acquiring a Jamaican passport to play for the nation. Despite this, Toney reportedly rejected Jamaica's call, as he harboured an ambition to represent his country of birth.

On 15 September 2022, Toney received his first call up to the England national team for 2022–23 UEFA Nations League fixtures against Italy and Germany, remaining an unused substitute. On 16 March 2023, he was called up to the squad for the first two matches of England's UEFA Euro 2024 qualifying campaign. He made his debut on 26 March in a 2–0 victory against Ukraine at Wembley Stadium, coming on as an 81st-minute substitute for Harry Kane. On 26 March 2024, Toney scored his first international goal, on his first international start, scoring a penalty in the 17th minute of a 2–2 draw with Belgium at Wembley in a friendly.

He was named in England's 26-man squad for UEFA Euro 2024. He made his tournament debut in the round of 16 against Slovakia, coming on as a substitute in stoppage time. In the first minute of extra time, he assisted captain Harry Kane's winning goal with a header across goal.

In the quarter-final against Switzerland, Toney replaced Kane in the 20th minute of extra-time and scored the team's fourth kick of the penalty shootout as England won 5–3.

On 22 May 2025, new manager Thomas Tuchel recalled Toney to the national team with Tuchel stating that he gave Phil Foden a rest. He returned to playing for England during the 3–1 defeat against Senegal on 10 June that year.

On 22 May 2026, in a controversial decision, Toney was selected by Tuchel in his 26-man squad to represent England in the 2026 FIFA World Cup. Despite scoring 42 goals across all competitions during the season, his selection was criticised by some pundits due to his move to the Saudi Pro League.

== Criminal offences ==
=== Betting ===
On 16 November 2022, it was revealed that Toney had been charged by the Football Association with an alleged 232 breaches of its gambling laws from almost 10 years prior with former Northampton Town teammates, Dean Snedker and Lewis Wilson. On 20 December, he was charged by the FA with a further 30 breaches of betting laws, bringing the total charges to 262. He admitted many of the charges in February 2023, but contested others.

On 2 March, he said he was "shocked and disappointed" to see press speculation about the case, especially since he had not yet had a formal hearing. In May 2023, he was banned from football for eight months (being allowed to return to training at the halfway point), charged £50,000 and warned about his future conduct for 232 breaches of the FA's betting rules. His offences took place between 2017 and 2021.

The Football Association had first sought a 15-month ban for Toney, alleging that he lied over his gambling and tried to destroy evidence; not all of the FA's claims were upheld by the regulatory commission. The suspension was reduced to 11 months for admitting to his charges, and then to eight months when he was formally diagnosed with gambling addiction. Toney bet 126 times on games in the same competitions he was playing in, and 29 times on his team's games. He bet 13 times on his own team to lose, but did not play in any of those games. The regulatory commission concluded that he was not a match-fixer.

=== Assault ===
On 31 July 2026, Toney was charged with assault causing actual bodily harm in relation to an incident at a nightclub in Soho back on 6 December 2025. He was scheduled to appear at Westminster Magistrates' Court on 24 September.

== Career statistics ==
=== Club ===
As of match played 20 November 2026

Appearances and goals by club, season and competition
Club	Season	League			National cup (Note: Includes FA Cup, King's Cup)		League cup (Note: Includes Football League/EFL Cup)		Continental		Other		Total	
Club	Season	Division	Apps	Goals	Apps	Goals	Apps	Goals	Apps	Goals	Apps	Goals	Apps	Goals
Northampton Town	2012–13	League Two	0	0	1	0	0	0	—		0	0	1	0
Northampton Town	2013–14	League Two	13	3	0	0	1	0	—		1 (Note: Appearance in Football League Trophy)	0	15	3
Northampton Town	2014–15	League Two	40	8	2	1	1	1	—		1	0	44	10
Northampton Town	Total		53	11	3	1	2	1	—		2	0	60	13
Newcastle United	2015–16	Premier League	2	0	0	0	2	0	—		—		4	0
Barnsley (loan)	2015–16	League One	15	1	—		—		—		6 (Note: Three appearances and one goal in Football League Trophy, three appearances in League One play-offs)	1	21	2
Shrewsbury Town (loan)	2016–17	League One	19	6	3	0	2	0	—		2 (Note: Appearances in EFL Trophy)	1	26	7
Scunthorpe United (loan)	2016–17	League One	15	6	—		—		—		2 (Note: Appearances in League One play-offs)	1	17	7
Wigan Athletic (loan)	2017–18	League One	24	4	4	2	0	0	—		0	0	28	6
Scunthorpe United (loan)	2017–18	League One	16	8	—		—		—		2	0	18	8
Peterborough United	2018–19	League One	44	16	4	4	1	0	—		6	3	55	23
Peterborough United	2019–20	League One	32	24	4	2	1	0	—		2	0	39	26
Peterborough United	Total		76	40	8	6	2	0	—		8	3	94	49
Brentford	2020–21	Championship	45	31	0	0	4	0	—		3 (Note: Appearances in Championship play-offs)	2	52	33
Brentford	2021–22	Premier League	33	12	2	1	2	1	—		—		37	14
Brentford	2022–23	Premier League	33	20	0	0	2	1	—		—		35	21
Brentford	2023–24	Premier League	17	4	0	0	0	0	—		—		17	4
Brentford	Total		128	67	2	1	8	2	—		3	2	141	72
Al-Ahli	2024–25	Saudi Pro League	30	23	1	1	—		13 (Note: Appearances in AFC Champions League Elite)	6	—		44	30
Al-Ahli	2025–26	Saudi Pro League	32	32	4	6	—		10	2	3 (Note: Two appearances and one goal in Saudi Super Cup, one appearance and one goal in FIFA Intercontinental Cup)	2	49	42
Al-Ahli	2026–27	Saudi Pro League	10	14	0	0	—		4	1	2 (Note: Appearances in FIFA Intercontinental Cup)	0	16	15
Al-Ahli	Total		72	69	5	7	—		27	9	5	2	109	87
Career total			419	210	25	17	16	3	27	9	30	10	517	251

=== International ===
As of match played 18 July 2026

Appearances and goals by national team and year
National team	Year	Apps	Goals
England	2023	1	0
England	2024	5	1
England	2025	1	0
England	2026	3	0
Total		10	1

As of matches played 16 July 2026
England score listed first, score column indicates score after each Toney goal

List of international goals scored by Ivan Toney
No.	Date	Venue	Cap	Opponent	Score	Result	Competition	Ref.
1	26 March 2024	Wembley Stadium, London, England	2	Belgium	1–1	2–2	Friendly	

== Honours ==
Barnsley

- Football League One play-offs: 2016
- Football League Trophy: 2015–16

Wigan Athletic

- EFL League One: 2017–18

Brentford

- EFL Championship play-offs: 2021

Al-Ahli

- AFC Champions League Elite: 2024–25, 2025–26
- Saudi Super Cup: 2025

England

- UEFA European Championship runner-up: 2024
- FIFA World Cup third place: 2026

Individual

- Brentford Supporters' Player of the Year: 2020–21
- EFL Championship Golden Boot: 2020–21
- EFL Championship Team of the Season: 2020–21
- PFA Team of the Year: 2019–20 EFL League One
- PFA EFL Championship Team of the Year: 2020–21
- EFL League One Player of the Year: 2019–20
- Premier League Goal of the Month: September 2022
- King's Cup Top Scorer: 2025–26
