= Kelvin Langmead =

English footballer (born 1985)

Personal information
- Full name: Kelvin Steven Langmead
- Date of birth: 23 March 1985 (age 41)
- Place of birth: Coventry, England
- Position: Defender

Senior career*
Years	Team	Apps	(Gls)
2002–2004	Preston North End	1	(0)
2003	→ Tamworth (loan)	2	(0)
2004	→ Carlisle United (loan)	11	(1)
2004	→ Kidderminster Harriers (loan)	10	(1)
2004	→ Shrewsbury Town (loan)	3	(1)
2004–2010	Shrewsbury Town	231	(18)
2010–2012	Peterborough United	32	(3)
2011–2012	→ Northampton Town (loan)	20	(1)
2012–2015	Northampton Town	59	(10)
2015–2016	Ebbsfleet United	11	(0)
2015–2016	→ Kidderminster Harriers (loan)	39	(3)
2016–2018	Nuneaton Town	51	(6)
2018–2019	Harrogate Town	36	(3)
2019–2020	Brackley Town	15	(1)
2020–2023	Banbury United	66	(10)
2023–2024	Kettering Town	37	(3)
2024	Racing Club Warwick	2	(0)
Total		626	(61)

Managerial career
- 2025–2026: Banbury United
- * Club domestic league appearances and goals

Kelvin Steven Langmead (born 23 March 1985) is an English former professional footballer and manager.

== Playing Career ==
=== Preston North End ===
Langmead began his career as a trainee at Preston North End joining in 2001. He spent a month on loan to Tamworth in the Football Conference, where he played two matches in September 2003.

Later in the same season Preston loaned him to then Division 3 club Carlisle. He played 11 matches, with his league début coming in a 4–1 defeat at Torquay on 6 March 2004. His first goal was at Mansfield in a 3–2 win on 24 April.

In September 2004 Langmead was again sent out on loan, this time to Kidderminster Harriers in the newly named League Two. He played 11 matches for the Harriers and scored one goal.

He then returned to Preston to make his only appearance for the club, coming on as a substitute in the Championship game against Millwall (1–1, 13 November 2004).

=== Shrewsbury Town ===
Two weeks after his Preston debut, he was again sent on loan, this time to Shrewsbury Town, this came shortly after the appointment of former Preston manager and youth development chief Gary Peters. Langmead played just three matches for the Shropshire club (scoring one goal) before making the move a permanent one, signing for £5,000.

Langmead then made more than 80 appearances in League Two for Shrewsbury as a striker. However, in September 2006, with a shortage of defenders, Gary Peters trialled him at centre-back in a reserve fixture. He was then utilised in this position for the first team, and was recognised in the League Two team of the week for his performance against Macclesfield Town on 6 October 2006. Langmead's success in this position saw him play out the rest of the season at centre-back, as Shrewsbury reached the League Two play-off final. Langmead also earned the Player of the Season award as voted for by both players and fans, for his consistency that term.

The following season, Salop's first at the New Meadow, Langmead was a little inconsistent this season, with a frequent change in defensive partners, Langmead was unable to find the form of the previous year.

At the start of the 2008–09 season, Langmead struggled to gain a place in the first team, as Paul Simpson preferred a central defensive partnership of Mike Jackson and Graham Coughlan. However, in the latter half of the campaign he regained a regular place, playing alongside Coughlan at the heart of the defence. The season ended in heartache for Langmead as Shrewsbury lost in the League Two play-off final for the second time in three years. In June 2009 he signed a new two-year contract.

=== Peterborough United ===
On 24 June 2010, he was sold to Peterborough United on a three-year deal for an undisclosed fee. On 7 August 2010, he made his debut in a convincing 3–0 home win over Bristol Rovers. He was virtually ever present for Peterborough United under Gary Johnson, however he fell out of favour under new manager Darren Ferguson. Langmead played over 40 times, scoring 4 goals, as the club gained promotion back to the Championship via the Play-offs.

=== Northampton Town ===
On 9 August 2011, he re-joined former Peterborough United manager Gary Johnson at League Two club Northampton Town on a one-month loan. Later that day, he made his debut for Northampton Town in a shock 2–1 win over Championship side Ipswich Town at Portman Road in the League Cup first round. He came off the bench to replace Bas Savage in stoppage time. After a difficult first season, Langmead came back the following season, fitter and stronger with a point to prove. This led to Langmead being made captain as the team pushed for a top 3 finish. Devastatingly for Langmead he suffered a Knee injury that not only kept him out of the play-off final against Bradford City, it also would see him not start again for the club for a further 18months. When Langmead returned, there had been a lot of change at the club, including the manager, and it was time for Langmead to leave and get a fresh start.

=== Non-league ===
After leaving Northampton Town by mutual consent, Langmead dropped into non-league football.

After a spell at Ebbsfleet United, he then spent a season-long loan at Kidderminster Harriers, before joining Nuneaton Town in the summer of 2016. He spent 2 seasons with Nuneaton.

In July 2018, Langmead joined Harrogate Town on a free transfer, where he helped them reach the National League Play-offs.

After one season with Harrogate Town he joined local side Brackley Town in the summer of 2019. Langmead didn't play as much as he would have liked and left the following summer.

In July 2020, Langmead joined Banbury United. Although Langmead's first season with the club was cut short due to the pandemic, he helped them reach the FA Cup First Round for the first time in over 40years. Langmead returned the following season to help the club win the Southern League Central Title by 23 points. He was also part of the defence with the best defensive record that season. Again like the previous year, Banbury reached the FA Cup First round, thanks to Langmead's winner against Bath City in the previous qualifying round. After another successful season, Langmead signed on for a 3rd season. However, Langmead's start to his 3rd campaign suffered a blow in the week leading up to Banbury's first ever season at Step 2. Langmead suffered an Achilles injury which kept him out until December. Langmead returned against Brackley Town on Boxing Day. His first start came against Hereford United where he scored 2 goals as they won 3.2. Langmead would go on to help keep Banbury in the Conference North playing a further 25 games.

In June 2023, Langmead left Banbury, signing for Kettering Town. Langmead played 43 times in total scoring 3 goals.

In June 2024, Langmead joined Racing Club Warwick following their promotion to the NPL Division One Midlands. He made two league appearances for the club.

In October 2024, Langmead announced his retirement from football.

== Managerial Career ==
On 2 June 2025, Langmead was appointed as manager to his former club Bandbury United.

On 28 October 2026, Langmead resigned after stating that the players "need a new voice, a new approach, something different to allow them to move forward".

== Career statistics ==
As of matches played 30th April 2024

Appearances and goals by club, season and competition
Club	Season	League			FA Cup		EFL Cup		Other		Total	
Club	Season	Division	Apps	Goals	Apps	Goals	Apps	Goals	Apps	Goals	Apps	Goals
Preston North End	2004–05	Championship	1	0	0	0	0	0	0	0	1	0
Tamworth (loan)	2003–04	National League	2	0	0	0	0	0	0	0	2	0
Carlisle United (loan)	2003–04	Third Division	11	1	0	0	0	0	0	0	11	1
Kidderminster Harriers (loan)	2004–05	League Two	10	1	0	0	0	0	1 (Note: Appearances in Football League Trophy)	0	11	1
Shrewsbury Town (loan)	2004–05	League Two	3	1	0	0	0	0	0	0	3	1
Shrewsbury Town	2004–05	League Two	25	2	0	0	0	0	0	0	25	2
Shrewsbury Town	2005–06	League Two	42	9	2	0	1	0	1	0	46	9
Shrewsbury Town	2006–07	League Two	45	3	1	0	1	0	6 (Note: Three appearances in Football League Trophy, three appearances in League Two play-offs)	0	53	3
Shrewsbury Town	2007–08	League Two	39	1	1	0	1	0	1	0	42	1
Shrewsbury Town	2008–09	League Two	33	0	0	0	1	0	7 (Note: Four appearances in Football League Trophy, three appearances in League Two play-offs)	0	41	0
Shrewsbury Town	2009–10	League Two	44	3	1	0	1	0	1	0	47	3
Shrewsbury Town	Total		231	19	5	0	5	0	16	0	257	19
Peterborough United	2010–11	League One	32	3	4	1	3	0	2 (Note: One appearance in Football League Trophy, one appearance in League One play-offs)	0	41	4
Northampton Town (loan)	2011–12	League Two	41	4	1	0	2	0	1	0	45	4
Northampton Town	2012–13	League Two	39	7	2	1	2	0	4 (Note: Four appearances in Football League Trophy, one appearance in League Two play-offs)	0	47	8
Northampton Town	2013–14	League Two	3	0	0	0	0	0	0	0	3	0
Northampton Town	2014–15	League Two	7	0	1	0	0	0	1	0	9	0
Ebbsfleet United	2014–15	Conference South	11	0	0	0	—		3 (Note: Appearances in FA Trophy)	0	14	0
Kidderminster Harriers (loan)	2015–16	National League	39	3	1	0	0	0	1	0	41	3
Nuneaton Town	2016–17	National League North	42	5	1	0	—		4	0	47	5
Nuneaton Town	2017–18	National League North	8	1	0	0	—		0	0	9	1
Harrogate Town	2018–19	National League	36	3	2	0	—		1	0	39	3
Brackley Town	2019–20	National League North	15	1	0	0	—		0	0	15	1
Banbury United	2020–21 2021-22 2022-23	Southern League Premier Division Central	66	10	10	2	—		2	0	78	12
Kettering Town	2023-24	Southern League Premier Division Central	37	3	4	0			2	0	43	3
		Career total	631	61	31	4	12	0	38	0	712	65

== Honours ==
Peterborough United

- Football League One play-offs: 2011
