= Ashley Corker =

English footballer

Personal information
- Full name: Ashley James Corker
- Date of birth: 18 September 1990 (age 36)
- Place of birth: Marske-by-the-Sea, England
- Height: 1.80 m (5 ft 11 in)
- Position: Left back

Team information
- Current team: Joondalup City F.C

Youth career
- 1997–2010: Middlesbrough

Senior career*
Years	Team	Apps	(Gls)
2011–2012	Northampton Town	16	(0)
2012	Cambridge United	1	(0)
2012–2013	Whitby Town	28	(2)
2013–	Perth Soccer Club	14	(1)
Total		59	(3)
- * Club domestic league appearances and goals

Ashley James Corker (born 18 September 1990) is an English part-time footballer currently at Joondalup City Football Club.

== Career ==
=== Middlesbrough ===
Corker started his career at Middlesbrough, coming through their ever-producing academy. Once completing his scholarship with the club, he signed a one-year contract extension. He was released at the end of the season due to change of manager. Following this, Corker then spent a season playing the Northern Premier League.

=== Northampton Town ===
On 11 July 2011, he signed a one-year contract for Northampton Town following a successful trial. On 6 August 2011, he made his debut for Northampton Town against Accrington Stanley, starting at left back. He was subbed off after 86 minutes for Bas Savage. On 10 August 2011, he completed a full match for Northampton Town in the team that knocked-out Championship side Ipswich Town 2–1 at Portman Road in the League Cup first round. On 31 January 2011 Corker and teammate Paul Walker were released by mutual consent from the Cobblers.

=== Cambridge United ===
Corker signed for Conference National side Cambridge United on 21 March 2012 until the end of the season. On 1 May 2012 it was announced that due to agreement between the player and U's boss Jez George Corker would not be taking up the one-year contract extension offer to remain at the U's for the 2012–13 season and he would be leaving the Abbey Stadium outfit with immediate effect.

=== Whitby Town ===
In September 2012, Corker joined Northern Premier League side Whitby Town.

=== Perth Soccer Club ===
On 10 April 2013, Corker joined Football West Premier League side Perth Soccer Club.

=== Joondalup City Football Club ===
in 2022, Ash Corker joins State League Division Two side Joondalup City under the management of head coach Louis Barker who has had champions league experience.

== Career statistics ==
Club	Season	League		FA Cup		League Cup		Other		Total	
Club	Season	Apps	Goals	Apps	Goals	Apps	Goals	Apps	Goals	Apps	Goals
Northampton Town	2011–12	16	0	0	0	2	0	1	0	19	0
Cambridge United	2011–12	1	0	0	0	0	0	0	0	1	0

As of 22 March 2012
