= 2014–15 Northampton Town F.C. season =

Northampton Town
2014–15 season
- Chairman: David Cardoza
- Manager: Chris Wilder
- Stadium: Sixfields Stadium
- League Two: 12th
- FA Cup: First round
- League Cup: Second round
- Football League Trophy: Quarter-final
- Top goalscorer: League: Marc Richards (18); All: Marc Richards (18)
- Highest home attendance: 5,668 vs Luton Town
- Lowest home attendance: 3,653 vs Hartlepool United
- Average home league attendance: 4,548
Home colours	Away colours

The 2014–15 season was Northampton Town's 118th season in their history and the sixth successive season in League Two. Alongside competing in League Two, the club also participated in the FA Cup, League Cup and Football League Trophy.

== Players ==
As of match played 2 May 2015.

No.	Name	Position	Nat.	Place of birth	Date of birth (age)	Apps	Goals	Previous club	Date signed	Fee
Goalkeepers
1	Matt Duke	GK	(England)	Sheffield	16 June 1977 (aged 37)	92	0	Bradford City	24 June 2013	Free
42	Shwan Jalal	GK	(Iraq)	Baghdad	14 August 1983 (aged 31)	4	0	Bury	24 February 2015	Free
Defenders
2	Brendan Moloney	RB	(Republic of Ireland)	Beaufort	18 January 1989 (aged 26)	22	1	Yeovil Town	2 January 2015	Free
3	Evan Horwood	LB	(England)	Billingham	10 March 1986 (aged 29)	34	0	Tranmere Rovers	2 July 2014	Free
6	Lee Collins	CB	(England)	Telford	28 September 1988 (aged 26)	86	1	Barnsley	8 February 2013	Free
12	Ben Tozer	U	(England)	Plymouth	1 March 1990 (aged 25)	199	7	Newcastle United	21 September 2010	Free
16	Zander Diamond	CB	(Scotland)	Alexandria	13 March 1985 (aged 30)	37	2	Burton Albion	7 May 2014	Free
17	Ross Perry	CB	(Scotland)	Falkirk	7 February 1990 (aged 25)	0	0	Raith Rovers	13 March 2015	Free
33	Tom Newey	LB	(England)	Sheffield	31 October 1982 (aged 32)	10	0	Oxford United	27 January 2015	Free
36	Ryan Cresswell	CB	(England)	Rotherham	22 December 1987 (aged 27)	36	5	Fleetwood Town	1 September 2014	£150,000
Midfielders
4	Darren Carter	CM	(England)	Solihull	18 December 1983 (aged 31)	65	6	Cheltenham Town	9 July 2013	Free
8	Ian Morris	LM	(Republic of Ireland)	Dublin	27 March 1987 (aged 28)	39	3	Torquay United	26 June 2013	Free
10	John-Joe O'Toole	CM	(Republic of Ireland)	Harrow (ENG)	30 September 1988 (aged 26)	40	2	Bristol Rovers	30 June 2014	Free
11	Chris Hackett	RM	(England)	Oxford	1 March 1983 (aged 32)	129	11	Millwall	3 July 2012	Free
15	Lewis Hornby	CM	(England)	Northampton	25 April 1995 (aged 20)	29	0	Academy	10 December 2011	N/A
19	Lawson D'Ath	RM	(England)	Witney	24 December 1992 (aged 22)	45	9	Reading	7 August 2014	Free
21	Jason Taylor	CM	(England)	Droylsden	28 January 1987 (aged 28)	21	0	Cheltenham Town	1 January 2015	Free
23	Kaid Mohamed	LM	(Wales)	Ely	23 July 1984 (aged 30)	28	5	Port Vale	12 June 2014	Loan
25	Joel Byrom	CM	(England)	Oswaldtwistle	14 September 1986 (aged 28)	43	3	Preston North End	8 January 2015	Free
26	Ricky Holmes	LM	(England)	Rochford	19 June 1987 (aged 27)	21	5	Portsmouth	27 January 2015	Free
Forwards
7	Billy Bodin	CF/LW	(Wales)	Swindon (ENG)	24 March 1992 (aged 23)	4	0	Torquay United	29 January 2015	Free
9	Marc Richards	CF	(England)	Wolverhampton	8 July 1982 (aged 32)	102	31	Chesterfield	14 May 2014	Free
14	James Gray	CF	(Northern Ireland)	Yarm (ENG)	26 June 1992 (aged 22)	8	3	Accrington Stanley	6 March 2015	Loan
22	Diego De Girolamo	CF	(Italy)	Chesterfield (ENG)	5 October 1995 (aged 19)	6	0	Sheffield United	19 March 2015	Loan
24	Ivan Toney	CF	(England)	Northampton	16 March 1996 (aged 19)	60	13	Academy	1 July 2012	N/A

== Pre-season ==
12 July 2014	Sileby Rangers	0–9	Northampton Town	Northampton
15:00 BST		Report	L.Collins 23'; I.Toney 45'; JJ.O'Toole 51', 59', 63'; A.Nicholls 75', 82', 86'; C.Hackett 80'	Stadium: Fernie Fields

17 July 2014	Alloa Athletic	1–1	Northampton Town	Alloa
19:45 BST	K.Cawley 80'	Report	M.Richards 9'	Stadium: Recreation Park; Referee: A Muir

22 July 2014	Northampton Town	1–1	Sheffield United	Northampton
19:45 BST	M.Richards 58' (pen.)	Report	A.Butler 27'	Stadium: Sixfields Stadium; Attendance: 1,514

26 July 2014	Northampton Town	0–1	Leyton Orient	Northampton
15:00 BST		Report	B.Pritchard 58'	Stadium: Sixfields Stadium; Attendance: 1,054 (142)

1 August 2014	Eastleigh	0–1	Northampton Town	Eastleigh
19:30 BST		Report	JJ.O'Toole 8'	Stadium: Ten Acres

== Competitions ==
=== Football League Two ===
==== League table ====
Pos	Team	Pld	W	D	L	GF	GA	GD	Pts
10	Exeter City	46	17	13	16	61	65	−4	64
11	Morecambe	46	17	12	17	53	52	+1	63
12	Northampton Town	46	18	7	21	67	62	+5	61
13	Oxford United	46	15	16	15	50	49	+1	61
14	Dagenham & Redbridge	46	17	8	21	58	59	−1	59

Updated to match(es) played on 23 May 2015. Source: BBC Sport
Rules for classification: 1) Points; 2) Goal difference; 3) Number of goals scored

==== Results summary ====
Overall								Home						Away					
Pld	W	D	L	GF	GA	GD	Pts	W	D	L	GF	GA	GD	W	D	L	GF	GA	GD
46	18	7	21	67	62	+5	61	13	2	8	39	27	+12	5	5	13	28	35	−7

Last updated: 2 May 2015.
Source: League Two

==== League position by match ====
Round	1	2	3	4	5	6	7	8	9	10	11	12	13	14	15	16	17	18	19	20	21	22	23	24	25	26	27	28	29	30	31	32	33	34	35	36	37	38	39	40	41	42	43	44	45	46
Ground	H	A	A	H	H	A	A	H	H	A	A	H	A	H	A	H	A	H	A	H	A	H	A	H	A	H	H	A	H	A	A	H	A	H	A	H	H	A	H	A	H	A	A	H	A	H
Result	W	D	L	D	W	W	L	W	L	W	D	L	L	L	L	W	L	W	L	L	L	L	L	D	W	W	W	W	W	L	D	W	W	W	L	W	L	L	W	D	L	L	D	W	L	L
Position	7	9	15	13	8	7	9	5	9	5	6	9	12	16	18	15	17	14	15	16	18	19	20	20	17	15	14	12	11	13	11	11	10	10	10	10	10	11	10	11	11	11	11	10	10	12

Source: Northampton Town F.C.
A = Away; H = Home; W = Win; D = Draw; L = Loss

==== Matches ====
Win Draw Loss

8 August 2014 1	Northampton Town	1–0	Mansfield Town	Northampton
15:00 BST	K.Mohamed 26'	Report		Stadium: Sixfields Stadium; Attendance: 5,202; Referee: Andy Davies

16 August 2014 2	York City	1–1	Northampton Town	York
15:00 BST	A.Straker 67'	Report	M.Richards 90'	Stadium: Bootham Crescent; Attendance: 3,448; Referee: Darren Handley

19 August 2014 3	Portsmouth	2–0	Northampton Town	Portsmouth
19:45 BST	J.Wallace 26'; C.Westcarr 39'	Report		Stadium: Fratton Park; Attendance: 15,004; Referee: Gavin Ward

23 August 2014 4	Northampton Town	1–1	Shrewsbury Town	Northampton
15:00 BST	E.Sinclair 90'	Report	L.Lawrence (red card) 27'; J.Collins 63'	Stadium: Sixfields Stadium; Attendance: 4,369; Referee: Darren Deadman

30 August 2014 5	Northampton Town	1–0	Exeter City	Northampton
15:00 BST	M.Richards 89'	Report		Stadium: Sixfields Stadium; Attendance: 4,053; Referee: Michael Bull

6 September 2014 6	Dagenham & Redbridge	0–2	Northampton Town	Dagenham, London
15:00 BST		Report	M.Richards 8', 23'	Stadium: Victoria Road; Attendance: 2,186; Referee: Graham Horwood

13 September 2014 7	Newport County	3–2	Northampton Town	Newport, Wales
15:00 BST	C.Zebroski 18'; D.Jones 33'; L.Minshull 53'	Report	L.D'Ath 76'; M.Richards 85'	Stadium: Rodney Parade; Attendance: 2,875; Referee: Chris Sarginson

16 September 2014 8	Northampton Town	5–1	Hartlepool United	Northampton
19:45 BST	M.Richards 12' (pen.); K.Mohamed 20', 35'; L.D'Ath 67'	Report	C.Wyke 1'	Stadium: Sixfields Stadium; Attendance: 3,653; Referee: Simon Hooper

20 September 2014 9	Northampton Town	4–5	Accrington Stanley	Northampton
15:00 BST	M.Richards 26'; I.Toney 78', 89'; D.Carter 90+4'	Report	R.Atkinson 22', 37'; J.O'Sullivan 28', 75'; S.Maguire 84'	Stadium: Sixfields Stadium; Attendance: 4,731; Referee: Carl Boyeson

27 September 2014 10	Morecambe	0–1	Northampton Town	Morecambe
15:00 BST		Report	I.Toney 33'	Stadium: Globe Arena; Attendance: 1,725; Referee: Scott Duncan

4 October 2014 11	Wycombe Wanderers	1–1	Northampton Town	High Wycombe
15:00 BST	A.Amadi-Holloway 90'	Report	R.Cresswell 31'; G.Robertson (red card) 86'	Stadium: Adams Park; Attendance: 3,822; Referee: Pat Miller

11 October 2014 12	Northampton Town	1–2	Burton Albion	Northampton
14:00 BST	R.Cresswell 80'	Report	J.Blyth 45'; A.MacDonald 86'	Stadium: Sixfields Stadium; Attendance: 4,935; Referee: Gary Sutton

18 October 2014 13	Cheltenham Town	3–2	Northampton Town	Cheltenham
15:00 BST	T.Gornell 45', 78'; J.Marquis 84'	Report	J.Byrom 48'; D.Moyo 86'	Stadium: Whaddon Road; Attendance: 2,447; Referee: Keith Hill

21 October 2014 14	Northampton Town	1–3	Oxford United	Northampton
19:45 BST	E.Stevens 4'	Report	D.Hylton 25', 27' (pen.); A.Potter 50'	Stadium: Sixfields Stadium; Attendance: 4,577; Referee: Phil Gibbs

25 October 2014 15	Luton Town	1–0	Northampton Town	Luton
15:00 BST	L.Guttridge 90+1'	Report		Stadium: Kenilworth Road; Attendance: 10,040; Referee: Darren Sheldrake

1 November 2014 16	Northampton Town	2–0	AFC Wimbledon	Northampton
15:00 GMT	K.Mohamed 32'; A.Nicholls 90+4'	Report		Stadium: Sixfields Stadium; Attendance: 4,548; Referee: James Linington

14 November 2014 17	Cambridge United	2–1	Northampton Town	Cambridge
19:45 GMT	A.Cunnington 51'; R.Bird 79'	Report	I.Toney 50'	Stadium: Abbey Stadium; Attendance: 5,644; Referee: Trevor Kettle

22 November 2014 18	Northampton Town	1–0	Stevenage	Northampton
15:00 GMT	M.Richards 20'	Report		Stadium: Sixfields Stadium; Attendance: 4,431; Referee: Andy D'Urso

29 November 2014 19	Southend United	2–0	Northampton Town	Southend-on-Sea
15:00 GMT	J.Archer (red card) 67'; B.Corr 69' (pen.); D.Worrell 79'	Report		Stadium: Roots Hall; Attendance: 5,500; Referee: Keith Stroud

13 December 2014 20	Northampton Town	2–3	Plymouth Argyle	Northampton
15:00 GMT	I.Toney 79'; S.Murdoch 89'	Report	P.Hartley 2'; A.Kellett 40'; L.Alessandra 62'	Stadium: Sixfields Stadium; Attendance: 4,318; Referee: Fred Graham

20 December 2014 21	Carlisle United	2–1	Northampton Town	Carlisle
15:00 GMT	T.Archibald-Henville 17'; B.Potts 61'	Report	M.Richards 45+5' (pen.)	Stadium: Brunton Park; Attendance: 4,421; Referee: Seb Stockbridge

26 December 2014 22	Northampton Town	2–3	Bury	Northampton
15:00 GMT	M.Richards 6'; I.Toney (red card) 64'; C.Hackett 77'	Report	A.Tutte 30'; T.Soares 45'; D.Mayor 57'; H.White (red card) 65'	Stadium: Sixfields Stadium; Attendance: 4,563; Referee: Michael Bull

28 December 2014 23	Tranmere Rovers	2–1	Northampton Town	Birkenhead
15:00 GMT	K.Odejayi 32'; J.Kirby 63'	Report	M.Richards 44'	Stadium: Prenton Park; Attendance: 5,394; Referee: Andy Haines

3 January 2015 24	Northampton Town	1–1	Southend United	Northampton
15:00 GMT	L.D'Ath 72'	Report	S.Coulthirst 47'	Stadium: Sixfields Stadium; Attendance: 4,587; Referee: Tim Robinson

10 January 2015 25	Exeter City	0–2	Northampton Town	Exeter
15:00 GMT		Report	M.Richards 20'; JJ.O'Toole 29'	Stadium: St James Park; Attendance: 3,519; Referee: Kevin Johnson

17 January 2015 26	Northampton Town	1–0	Dagenham & Redbridge	Northampton
15:00 GMT	R.Holmes 60'	Report		Stadium: Sixfields Stadium; Attendance: 4,122; Referee: Charles Breakspear

24 January 2015 27	Northampton Town	3–0	Newport County	Northampton
15:00 GMT	R.Cresswell 13'; JJ.O'Toole 29'; L.D'Ath 82'	Report		Stadium: Sixfields Stadium; Attendance: 4,226; Referee: Darren Deadman

31 January 2015 28	Accrington Stanley	1–5	Northampton Town	Accrington
15:00 GMT	P.Mingoia 40'	Report	R.Holmes 5'; M.Richards 32', 67'; R.Cresswell (red card) 38'; L.D'Ath 65', 80'	Stadium: Crown Ground; Attendance: 1,328; Referee: David Webb

7 February 2015 29	Northampton Town	2–1	Morecambe	Northampton
15:00 GMT	J.Byrom 1'; M.Richards 54'	Report	J.Devitt 41'	Stadium: Sixfields Stadium; Attendance: 4,307; Referee: Robert Lewis

10 February 2015 30	Hartlepool United	1–0	Northampton Town	Hartlepool
19:45 GMT	M.Morgan 51'	Report		Stadium: Victoria Park; Attendance: 2,856; Referee: Nigel Miller

14 February 2015 31	Mansfield Town	1–1	Northampton Town	Mansfield
15:00 GMT	V.Oliver 48'	Report	JJ.O'Toole (red card) 36'; M.Richards 90+3' (pen.)	Stadium: Field Mill; Attendance: 4,614; Referee: Lee Collins

21 February 2015 32	Northampton Town	3–0	York City	Northampton
15:00 GMT	C.Hackett 4'; B.Moloney 48'; I.Toney 89'	Report		Stadium: Sixfields Stadium; Attendance: 4,694; Referee: Jeremy Simpson

28 February 2015 33	Shrewsbury Town	1–2	Northampton Town	Shrewsbury
15:00 GMT	M.Demetriou 84'	Report	C.Hackett 20'; J.Byrom 47'	Stadium: New Meadow; Attendance: 5,310; Referee: Chris Kavanagh

3 March 2015 34	Northampton Town	1–0	Portsmouth	Northampton
19:45 GMT	R.Holmes 25'	Report		Stadium: Sixfields Stadium; Attendance: 4,871; Referee: Phil Gibbs

7 March 2015 35	Plymouth Argyle	2–0	Northampton Town	Plymouth
15:00 GMT	A.O'Connor 28'; L.Alessandra 86'	Report		Stadium: Home Park; Attendance: 6,501; Referee: Steve Martin

14 March 2015 36	Northampton Town	1–0	Tranmere Rovers	Northampton
15:00 GMT	R.Cresswell 62'	Report		Stadium: Sixfields Stadium; Attendance: 4,428; Referee: Graham Salisbury

17 March 2015 37	Northampton Town	0–2	Carlisle United	Northampton
19:45 GMT		Report	J.Kennedy 69'; K.Dempsey 71'	Stadium: Sixfields Stadium; Attendance: 3,682; Referee: Tim Robinson

21 March 2015 38	Bury	2–1	Northampton Town	Bury
15:00 GMT	J.Riley (red card) 49'; K.Etuhu 66'; A.El-Abd 90+1'	Report	R.Holmes 10'	Stadium: Gigg Lane; Attendance: 3,969; Referee: David Coote

28 March 2015 39	Northampton Town	2–1	Luton Town	Northampton
15:00 BST	R.Holmes 64' (pen.); J.Gray 86'	Report	A.Lawless 46'	Stadium: Sixfields Stadium; Attendance: 5,668; Referee: Graham Scott

3 April 2015 40	Wimbledon	2–2	Northampton Town	Kingston upon Thames, London
15:00 BST	S.Rigg 58'; J.Reeves 60'	Report	J.Gray 66', 69'	Stadium: Kingsmeadow; Attendance: 4,667; Referee: Chris Sarginson

6 April 2015 41	Northampton Town	0–1	Cambridge United	Northampton
15:00 BST		Report	H.Dunk 1'	Stadium: Sixfields Stadium; Attendance: 5,520; Referee: Fred Graham

11 April 2015 42	Stevenage	2–1	Northampton Town	Stevenage
15:00 BST	C.Whelpdale 65'; S.Walton 90'	Report	Z.Diamond 39'	Stadium: Broadhall Way; Attendance: 3,378; Referee: Peter Bankes

14 April 2015 43	Oxford United	1–1	Northampton Town	Oxford
19:45 BST	A.MacDonald 90+1'	Report	I.Toney 38'	Stadium: Kassam Stadium; Attendance: 4,836; Referee: Brendan Malone

18 April 2015 44	Northampton Town	2–0	Cheltenham Town	Northampton
15:00 BST	I.Toney 57'; M.Richards 70'	Report		Stadium: Sixfields Stadium; Attendance: 4,579; Referee: Darren Sheldrake

25 April 2015 45	Burton Albion	3–1	Northampton Town	Burton-upon-Trent
15:00 BST	L.Akins 4', 41' (pen.); P.Edwards 31'	Report	L.D'Ath 53'	Stadium: Pirelli Stadium; Attendance: 5,720; Referee: Richard Clark

2 May 2015 46	Northampton Town	2–3	Wycombe Wanderers	Northampton
15:00 BST	S.Wood 67' (o.g.); R.Cresswell 85'	Report	A.Amadi-Holloway 35'; N.Yennaris 39'; A.Mawson 90+8'	Stadium: Sixfields Stadium; Attendance: 5,723; Referee: Eddie Ilderton

=== FA Cup ===
The draw for the first round of the FA Cup was made on 27 October 2014.

8 November 2014 First round	Northampton Town	0–0	Rochdale	Northampton
15:00 GMT		Report	I.Henderson (red card) 15'	Stadium: Sixfields Stadium; Attendance: 2,790; Referee: Kevin Johnson

18 November 2014 First round (r)	Rochdale	2–1	Northampton Town	Rochdale
19:45 GMT	R.Noble-Lazarus 85'; O.Lancashire 90+4'	Report	I.Toney 4'	Stadium: Spotland; Attendance: 1,717; Referee: Richard Clark

=== League Cup ===
12 August 2014 First round	Wolverhampton Wanderers	2–3	Northampton Town	Wolverhampton
19:45 BST	N.Dicko 66'; S.Ricketts 67'	Report	L.D'Ath 58', 74'; I.Toney 63'	Stadium: Molineux Stadium; Attendance: 6,171; Referee: Stuart Attwell

26 August 2014 Second round	Bournemouth	3–0	Northampton Town	Bournemouth
19:45 BST	D.Gosling 21'; B.Pitman 30'; C.Wilson 79'	Report		Stadium: Dean Court; Attendance: 5,250; Referee: Carl Berry

=== Football League Trophy ===
7 October 2014 Second round (s)	Portsmouth	1–2	Northampton Town	Portsmouth
19:45 BST	R.Taylor 36'	Report	D.Moyo 28'; K.Mohamed 55'	Stadium: Fratton Park; Attendance: 5,853; Referee: Graham Horwood

11 November 2014 Quarter-final (s)	Leyton Orient	2–0	Northampton Town	Leyton, London
19:45 GMT	J.Simpson 28'; M.Bartley 89'	Report		Stadium: Brisbane Road; Attendance: 1,966; Referee: Andy Davies

=== Appearances, goals and cards ===
No.	Pos	Player	League Two			FA Cup			League Cup			League Trophy			Total			Discipline	
No.	Pos	Player	Starts	Sub	Goals	Starts	Sub	Goals	Starts	Sub	Goals	Starts	Sub	Goals	Starts	Sub	Goals	Booked	Sent off (straight red)
1	GK	Matt Duke	29	1	–	1	–	–	1	–	–	1	–	–	32	1	–	–	–
2	RB	Brendan Maloney	22	–	1	–	–	–	–	–	–	–	–	–	22	–	1	4	–
3	LB	Evan Horwood	23	2	–	–	–	–	1	–	–	–	1	–	24	3	–	4	–
4	CM	Darren Carter	12	11	1	1	1	–	–	–	–	2	–	–	15	12	1	5	–
6	CB	Lee Collins	36	1	–	2	–	–	2	–	–	2	–	–	42	1	–	2	–
7	FW	Billy Bodin	–	4	–	–	–	–	-	–	–	–	–	–	–	4	–	–	–
8	LM	Ian Morris	–	2	–	–	–	–	1	–	–	–	–	–	1	2	–	–	–
9	ST	Marc Richards	26	5	18	1	–	–	–	2	–	1	1	–	28	8	18	1	–
10	CAM	John-Joe O'Toole	24	11	2	1	–	–	1	1	–	2	–	–	28	12	2	9	1
11	RM	Chris Hackett	20	18	3	–	1	–	–	–	–	–	1	–	20	20	3	2	–
12	U	Ben Tozer	15	7	–	2	–	–	1	1	–	2	–	–	20	8	–	4	–
14	ST	James Gray	7	1	3	–	–	–	–	–	–	–	–	–	7	1	3	–	–
15	CM	Lewis Hornby	–	–	–	–	–	–	–	–	–	–	–	–	–	–	–	–	–
16	CB	Zander Diamond	18	3	1	–	–	–	2	–	–	–	–	–	20	3	1	4	–
17	CB	Ross Perry	–	–	–	–	–	–	–	–	–	–	–	–	–	–	–	–	–
19	RM	Lawson D'Ath	31	10	7	1	–	–	1	1	2	1	–	–	34	11	9	3	–
21	CM	Jason Taylor	21	–	–	–	–	–	–	–	–	–	–	–	21	–	–	8	–
22	ST	Diego De Girolamo	4	2	–	–	–	–	–	–	–	–	–	–	4	2	–	–	–
23	LM	Kaid Mohamed	17	6	4	–	1	–	2	–	–	1	1	1	20	8	5	–	–
24	ST	Ivan Toney	22	16	8	2	–	1	1	–	1	–	1	–	25	17	10	10	1
25	CM	Joel Byrom	37	2	3	1	1	–	1	–	–	1	–	–	40	3	3	12	–
26	W	Ricky Holmes	21	–	5	–	–	–	–	–	–	–	–	–	21	–	5	4	–
33	LB	Tom Newey	5	4	–	1	–	–	–	–	–	–	–	–	6	4	–	2	–
36	CB	Ryan Cresswell	31	1	5	2	–	–	–	–	–	2	–	–	35	1	5	10	2
42	GK	Shwan Jalal	4	–	–	–	–	–	–	–	–	–	–	–	4	–	–	–	–
Players no longer at the club:
2	RB	Daniel Alfei	9	2	–	1	–	–	1	–	–	1	–	–	12	2	–	2	–
5	CB	Kelvin Langmead	4	3	–	–	1	–	–	–	–	–	1	–	4	5	–	–	–
7	ST	Emile Sinclair	1	9	1	2	–	–	1	–	–	1	–	–	5	9	1	–	–
13	GK	Dean Snedker	–	–	–	–	–	–	–	–	–	–	–	–	–	–	–	–	–
14	ST	Alex Nicholls	4	2	1	–	1	–	–	1	–	2	–	–	6	4	1	–	–
17	LB	Gregor Robertson	21	1	–	–	–	–	2	–	–	–	–	–	23	1	–	3	1
18	CM	Ricky Ravenhill	8	4	–	–	–	–	2	–	–	1	–	–	11	4	–	2	–
20	ST	David Moyo	–	3	1	–	–	–	–	1	–	1	–	1	1	4	2	–	–
21	GK	Jordan Archer	13	–	–	1	–	–	1	–	–	1	–	–	16	–	–	–	1
22	RB	Connor Roberts	–	–	–	–	–	–	–	–	–	–	–	–	–	–	–	–	–
26	CM	Ryan Watson	5	–	–	–	–	–	–	–	–	–	–	–	5	–	–	1	–
30	LB	Enda Stevens	4	–	1	–	–	–	–	–	–	–	–	–	4	–	1	2	–
30	CAM	Ollie Banks	3	–	–	–	–	–	–	–	–	–	–	–	3	–	–	1	–
32	CM	Stewart Murdoch	8	–	1	2	–	–	–	–	–	–	–	–	10	–	1	–	–

== Transfers ==
=== In ===
Players transferred in
Position	Player	Previous club	Fee	Date	Source
DF	(England) Zander Diamond	(England) Burton Albion	Free	7 May 2014	
FW	(England) Marc Richards	(England) Chesterfield	Free	14 May 2014	
MF	(Republic of Ireland) John-Joe O'Toole	(England) Bristol Rovers	Free	30 June 2014	
DF	(England) Evan Horwood	(England) Tranmere Rovers	Free	2 July 2014	
MF	(England) Lawson D'Ath	(England) Reading	Free	7 August 2014	
DF	(England) Ryan Cresswell	(England) Fleetwood Town	£150,000	31 August 2014	
MF	(England) Jason Taylor	(England) Cheltenham Town	Free	7 January 2015	
MF	(England) Joel Byrom	(England) Preston North End	Free	8 January 2015	
DF	(England) Tom Newey	(England) Oxford United	Free	27 January 2015	
MF	(England) Ricky Holmes	(England) Portsmouth	Free	27 January 2015	
FW	(Wales) Billy Bodin	(England) Torquay United	Free	29 January 2015	
DF	(Republic of Ireland) Brendan Moloney	(England) Yeovil Town	Free	2 February 2015	
GK	(England) Shwan Jalal	(England) Bury	Free	24 February 2015	

=== Out ===
Players transferred out
Position	Player	Next club	Fee	Date	Source
FW	(England) Alan Connell	(England) Grimsby Town	Free transfer (Released)	21 May 2014	
MF	(Republic of Ireland) Gary Deegan	(England) Southend United	Free transfer (Released)	21 May 2014	
MF	(England) Claudio Dias	(England) Corby Town	Free transfer (Released)	21 May 2014	
MF	(England) Matthew Harriott	(England) Welling United	Free transfer (Released)	21 May 2014	
FW	(England) JJ Hooper	(England) Havant & Waterlooville	Free transfer (Released)	21 May 2014	
DF	(France) Mathias Kouo-Doumbé	Free agent	Free transfer (Released)	21 May 2014	
GK	(Australia) Ben McNamara	Free agent	Free transfer (Released)	21 May 2014	
MF	(Republic of Ireland) Leon McSweeney	(England) Nuneaton Town	Free transfer (Released)	21 May 2014	
DF	(England) Joe Widdowson	(England) Bury	Free transfer (Released)	21 May 2014	
MF	(England) Ricky Ravenhill	(England) Mansfield Town	Free transfer (Released)	7 January 2015	
FW	(England) David Moyo	(England) Brackley Town	Free transfer (Released)	12 January 2015	
FW	(England) Emile Sinclair	(England) York City	Free transfer (Released)	19 January 2015	

=== Loans in ===
Players loaned in
Position	Player	Loaned from	Date	Loan expires	Source
MF	(Wales) Kaid Mohamed	(England) Port Vale	12 June 2014	3 May 2015	
DF	(Wales) Daniel Alfei	(Wales) Swansea City	2 July 2014	2 January 2015	
GK	(Scotland) Jordan Archer	(England) Tottenham Hotspur	5 August 2014	2 January 2015	
MF	(England) Joel Byrom	(England) Preston North End	21 August 2014	4 January 2015	
MF	(England) Ryan Watson	(England) Leicester City	1 September 2014	2 January 2015	
DF	(Republic of Ireland) Enda Stevens	(England) Aston Villa	10 October 2014	7 November 2014	
DF	(England) Tom Newey	(England) Oxford United	30 October 2014	2 January 2015	
MF	(Scotland) Stewart Murdoch	(England) Fleetwood Town	30 October 2014	2 January 2015	
MF	(England) Ollie Banks	(England) Chesterfield	27 November 2014	23 December 2014	
MF	(England) Jason Taylor	(England) Cheltenham Town	2 January 2015	7 January 2015	
MF	(England) Ricky Holmes	(England) Portsmouth	2 January 2015	27 January 2015	
DF	(Republic of Ireland) Brendan Moloney	(England) Yeovil Town	2 January 2015	2 February 2015	
FW	(Northern Ireland) James Gray	(England) Accrington Stanley	6 March 2015	3 May 2015	
MF	(Italy) Diego De Girolamo	(England) Sheffield United	19 March 2015	30 June 2015	

=== Loans out ===
Players loaned out
Position	Player	Loaned to	Date	Loan expires	Source
GK	(England) Dean Snedker	(England) Brackley Town	6 August 2014	15 September 2014	
FW	(England) Alex Nicholls	(England) Exeter City	1 September 2014	4 October 2014	
MF	(Republic of Ireland) John-Joe O'Toole	(England) Southend United	27 November 2014	24 January 2015	
FW	(England) Alex Nicholls	(England) Exeter City	27 November 2014	7 January 2015	
