= Ricky Holmes =

English footballer

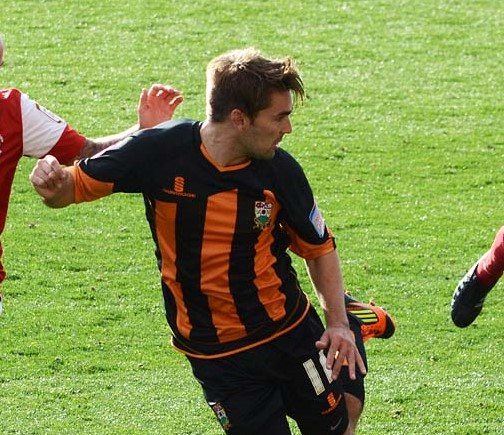
- Holmes playing for Barnet in September 2012

Personal information
- Full name: Ricky Lee Holmes
- Date of birth: 19 June 1987 (age 39)
- Place of birth: Rochford, England
- Height: 5 ft 8 in (1.73 m)
- Position: Winger

Team information
- Current team: Chelmsford City
- Number: 11

Youth career
- 1992–2002: Fairfax Rangers
- 2002–2004: Southend United

Senior career*
Years	Team	Apps	(Gls)
- Southend Manor
–2005	White Ensign		
2005–2010	Chelmsford City	154	(49)
2010–2013	Barnet	91	(15)
2013–2015	Portsmouth	53	(2)
2015	→ Northampton Town (loan)	4	(1)
2015–2016	Northampton Town	45	(13)
2016–2018	Charlton Athletic	58	(19)
2018–2020	Sheffield United	5	(0)
2018–2019	→ Oxford United (loan)	16	(3)
2019	→ Gillingham (loan)	0	(0)
2020–2021	Northampton Town	9	(1)
2021	Southend United	14	(0)
2021–2023	Farnborough	57	(3)
2023	Dover Athletic	0	(0)
2023–2025	Farnborough	74	(17)
2025–	Chelmsford City	29	(0)

International career
2008	England C	1	(0)

Managerial career
- 2026: Chelmsford City (interim)
- * Club domestic league appearances and goals as of 20:20, 22 August 2026 (UTC)

Ricky Lee Holmes (born 19 June 1987) is an English professional footballer who plays as a striker or a winger for Chelmsford City.

Born in Rochford, Holmes began his football career with Southend-based clubs before joining Chelmsford City in 2005. After a successful stint with the team, he moved to Barnet in 2010, where he scored his first goal that November. Despite a foot injury in January 2011, he went on to have a successful 2011–12 season. Holmes then signed with Portsmouth in 2013, followed by Northampton Town in 2015, Charlton Athletic in 2016, and Sheffield United in 2018. In 2018, he had loan spells at Oxford United and Gillingham. After announcing his retirement in 2020 due to a back injury, Holmes returned to football, rejoining Northampton Town in 2020, signing with Southend United in 2021, and eventually joining Farnborough in August 2021.

== Career ==
=== Chelmsford City ===
Born in Rochford, started his career with Southend-based clubs Southend Manor and White Ensign, helping White Ensign to win the Essex Intermediate League in 2005. Holmes joined Chelmsford City in 2005 and made his debut on 9 November 2005 in a 3–1 Isthmian League Cup win against Horsham. Holmes made his full league debut for Chelmsford in August 2006, in a 1–1 draw against Bromley, also taking part in the club's impressive run in the FA Cup that year. He went on to become one of the club's top players, achieving promotion to the Conference South in 2007–08, a season in which he also won the club's player of the year award, scored 16 league goals. He also was linked with Championship side Crystal Palace. He remained a regular starter for the following two seasons.

On 5 February 2008, Holmes was named in the England C squad for the match against Wales Semi-pro. On the 21st he made his international debut for the side.

Holmes finished 2009–10 as City's top scorer, with 21 goals in the season. However, he was released in May 2010 after City allowed him to pursue his career at a higher level.

=== Barnet ===
On 15 June 2010, Holmes signed a contract with Barnet. He made his debut on 7 August, against Chesterfield. Holmes scored his first goal for Barnet on 20 November, in a 4–1 win over Northampton Town. The 2010–11 season ended prematurely in January for Holmes as he was ruled out for the rest of the season with a foot injury.

The 2011–12 season was more successful for Holmes. Under the management of Edgar Davids, Holmes' position was moved further towards the left wing, where he managed to score 10 goals. During the season, he consolidated his position in the Barnet first team. In an interview with Sky Sports that he believed he was better off playing as a second striker behind Izale McLeod (Bees' topscorer). In 2012–13, he scored a hat-trick on 21 December 2012, in a 3–2 win against Burton Albion. In February 2013, he suffered the same foot injury, and was sidelined for the rest of the season.

After Barnet's relegation, Holmes was linked to a number of clubs, the likes of Portsmouth, Leyton Orient, Gillingham, Burton Albion and Southend United providing competition for his signature.

=== Portsmouth ===
Holmes signed a two-year deal with Portsmouth on 21 June 2013, following the expiry of his contract at Barnet. He made his debut in a 4–1 home defeat to Oxford United on 3 August 2013. On 14 September, Holmes scored his first Pompey goal, in a 2–1 away victory over Burton Albion. Holmes received the fans' Player of the Season award in 2013–14.

=== Northampton Town ===
On 2 January 2015, Holmes joined Northampton on an initial one-month loan deal. On 27 January 2015, after appearing in four matches and scoring once, he signed a 2 1/2-year permanent deal with the club.

=== Charlton Athletic ===
Holmes made a transfer request to Northampton on 15 June 2016 after repeated bids by Charlton and one day later after the 2 clubs eventually agreed a fee of £125,000, Holmes signed a two-year deal with the Addicks being the first signing for new manager Russell Slade. He scored his first goals for Charlton when he scored twice in a 3–0 win over Shrewsbury Town on 16 August 2016.

=== Sheffield United ===
On 15 January 2018, Holmes made the switch from Charlton Athletic to Sheffield United for an undisclosed fee after a year and a half at the Valley, rejoining former Northampton manager Chris Wilder.

He was transfer-listed by Sheffield United at the end of the 2018–19 season.

On 4 May 2020, having been released at the end of his Sheffield United contract, Holmes stated that he would retire from professional football due to a back injury picked up whilst working on a building site in Horsham, during his time playing semi-professionally at Chelmsford City.

==== Oxford United (loan) ====
On 9 August 2018, Holmes signed for Oxford United on a season-long loan. He returned to his parent club in January 2019 for treatment after his appearances were limited by a back injury.

==== Gillingham (loan) ====
Holmes signed for Gillingham on loan on transfer deadline day in January 2019. He joined the club despite being injured, in an effort to regain fitness. On 24 April 2019, however, he returned to parent club Sheffield United after he had failed to regain fitness. He made no appearances for Gillingham during his three months at the club.

=== Return to Northampton Town ===
Holmes rejoined Northampton on an "appearance related contract" on 2 November 2020, having spent time training with the club to regain fitness.

=== Southend United ===
On 18 February 2021, Holmes joined League Two side Southend United on a deal until the end of the 2020–21 season.

=== Farnborough ===
Holmes signed for Farnborough in August 2021. Following a two-year spell with the Hampshire-based side, Holmes left the club in June 2023. He left with over 60 appearances to his name.

=== Dover Athletic ===
On 2 July 2023, Holmes signed for Dover Athletic where he would also hold the role of assistant manager. He departed the club however on 11 July, becoming the third of Dover's new signings to reverse their decision and leave the club.

=== Return to Farnborough ===
On the same day as his abrupt departure from Dover was announced, Holmes returned to Farnborough. On 6 May 2025, it was announced that Holmes would leave Farnborough at the end of the 2024–25 campaign. He left the club having made 140 appearances, scoring 23 times.

=== Return to Chelmsford City ===
On 6 May 2025, 15 years after he departed the club, Holmes rejoined Chelmsford City in a player-coach role.

On 2 April 2026, Holmes was appointed interim manager in the short-term following the sacking of Angelo Harrop.

== Career statistics ==
=== Club ===
As of match played on 26 April 2025

Appearances and goals by club, season and competition
Club	Season	League			FA Cup		League Cup^{1}		Other^{2}		Total	
Club	Season	Division	Apps	Goals	Apps	Goals	Apps	Goals	Apps	Goals	Apps	Goals
Chelmsford City	2006–07	Isthmian League Premier Division	39	12	7	2	2	0	2	1	50	15
Chelmsford City	2007–08	Isthmian League Premier Division	38	16	3	1	2	0	7	4	48	21
Chelmsford City	2008–09	Conference South	36	6	1	0	3	0	8	4	48	10
Chelmsford City	2009–10	Conference South	41	15	3	1	0	0	12	5	56	21
Chelmsford City	Total		154	49	14	4	7	0	29	14	204	67
Barnet	2010–11	League Two	25	2	2	0	1	0	1	0	29	2
Barnet	2011–12	League Two	41	8	1	0	2	1	4	1	48	10
Barnet	2012–13	League Two	25	5	0	0	1	0	1	0	27	5
Barnet	Total		91	15	3	0	4	1	6	1	104	17
Portsmouth	2013–14	League Two	40	2	1	0	1	0	3	0	45	2
Portsmouth	2014–15	League Two	13	0	2	0	1	0	1	0	17	0
Portsmouth	Total		53	2	3	0	2	0	4	0	62	2
Northampton Town	2014–15	League Two	21	5	0	0	0	0	0	0	21	5
Northampton Town	2015–16	League Two	28	9	3	2	1	0	0	0	32	11
Northampton Town	Total		49	14	3	2	1	0	0	0	53	16
Charlton Athletic	2016–17	League One	35	13	1	0	1	0	1	0	38	13
Charlton Athletic	2017–18	League One	23	6	2	0	0	0	1	0	26	6
Charlton Athletic	Total		58	19	3	0	1	0	2	0	64	19
Sheffield United	2017–18	Championship	5	0	0	0	0	0	0	0	5	0
Sheffield United	2018–19	Championship	0	0	0	0	0	0	0	0	0	0
Sheffield United	2019–20	Premier League	0	0	0	0	0	0	0	0	0	0
Sheffield United	Total		5	0	0	0	0	0	0	0	5	0
Oxford United (loan)	2018–19	League One	16	3	0	0	1	0	2	1	19	4
Gillingham (loan)	2018–19	League One	0	0	0	0	0	0	0	0	0	0
Northampton Town	2020–21	League One	9	1	1	0	0	0	1	0	11	1
Southend United	2020–21	League Two	14	0	0	0	0	0	0	0	14	0
Farnborough	2021–22	SFL Premier Division South	25	2	2	0	0	0	2	1	29	3
Farnborough	2022–23	National League South	32	1	1	1	0	0	1	0	34	2
Farnborough	Total		57	3	3	1	0	0	3	1	63	5
Dover Athletic	2023–24	National League South	0	0	0	0	0	0	0	0	0	0
Farnborough	2023–24	National League South	39	6	0	0	0	0	1	0	40	6
Farnborough	2024–25	National League South	35	11	1	1	0	0	1	0	37	12
Farnborough	Total		74	17	1	1	0	0	2	0	77	18
Career total			577	123	31	8	16	1	49	17	675	149

^{1} Including matches for Football League Cup, Football Conference League Cup and Isthmian League Cup.

^{2} Including matches for FA Trophy, Football League Trophy, Football Conference play-offs and Essex Senior Cup.

=== Managerial statistics ===
As of match played 25 April 2026

Managerial record by team and tenure
Team	From	To	Record				
Team	From	To	P	W	D	L	Win %
Chelmsford City (interim)	2 April 2026	11 May 2026	6	2	3	1	33.33
Total			6	2	3	1	33.33

== Honours ==
Northampton Town

- Football League Two: 2015–16

Individual

- Portsmouth Player of the Season: 2013–14
- PFA Team of the Year: 2015–16 League Two
- Charlton Athletic Player of the Year: 2016–17
