= Alex Konstantinou =

Cypriot footballer (born 1992)

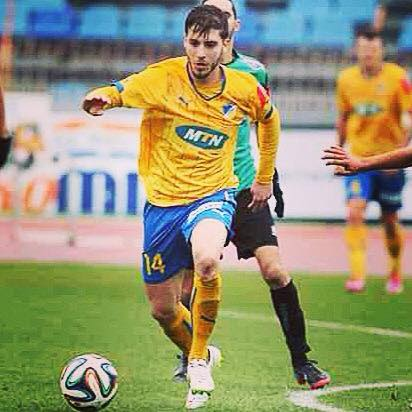
- Konstantinou with APOEL in 2015

Personal information
- Full name: Alexandros Konstantinou
- Date of birth: 11 April 1992 (age 34)
- Place of birth: Nicosia, Cyprus
- Height: 1.70 m (5 ft 7 in)
- Position: Winger

Youth career
- 2008–2010: Northampton Town

Senior career*
Years	Team	Apps	(Gls)
2010–2011	Northampton Town	0	(0)
2011	Belper Town	0	(0)
2011	Woburn Athletic	1	(0)
2012–2014	Apollon Limassol	35	(0)
2014–2016	APOEL	1	(0)
2015–2016	→ Doxa Katokopias (loan)	5	(0)
2016–2017	Nea Salamina	20	(0)
2017–2018	Ermis Aradippou	29	(4)
2018–2019	APOEL	0	(0)
2019	Olympiakos Nicosia	14	(5)
2019–2020	Pafos	7	(0)
2022–2023	APOP Parekklisia		
2023–2024	PAEEK	3	(0)
2024	Ermis Aradippou	0	(0)

International career^{‡}
2010	Cyprus U19	6	(1)
2013	Cyprus U21	3	(0)
- * Club domestic league appearances and goals as of 26 April 2024 ‡ National team caps and goals as of 11 October 2013

Alexandros "Alex" Konstantinou (Greek: Αλέξανδρος Κωνσταντίνου, born 11 April 1992) is a Cypriot–English professional footballer who plays as a winger.

== Career ==
=== Northampton Town ===
Konstantinou was a regular scorer for the Northampton Town youth team, before being handed a squad number in February 2010. Konstantinou, along with Paul Walker and Michael Jacobs, were awarded professional contracts for the 2010–11 season. He made his professional debut in the League Cup against Reading on 24 August 2010 setting up a 120+5 min equaliser.

Alex played one match for Woburn F.C. in the Bedfordshire County Football League Premier Division against Sharnbrook F.C. on Saturday, 1 October 2011. The match finished 3–2 to Sharnbrook F.C. In November 2011, he went on a three-week trial at Walsall followed by a further trial at King's Lynn Town FC.

=== Apollon Limassol ===
In August 2012, he signed a two-year contract with the Cypriot First Division side Apollon Limassol. During his two-year spell with the club, he managed to win the 2012–13 Cypriot Cup, his first career title. He competed in 35 league matches without scoring any goal. He also appeared in two qualifying and five group stage matches of the 2013–14 UEFA Europa League.

=== APOEL ===
On 3 June 2014, Konstantinou signed a three-year contract with APOEL. He made his official debut on 14 January 2015, playing the full 90 minutes in APOEL's 1–0 away victory against Olympiakos Nicosia for the Cypriot Cup. In his first season at APOEL, Alex appeared only in three matches in all competitions, but he managed to win the double, as his team won both the Cypriot championship and the cup.

On 25 June 2015, Alex joined Doxa Katokopias on a season-long loan deal from APOEL. On 3 June 2016, his contract with APOEL was mutually terminated.

== International career ==
He is also a Cypriot youth international. He debuted in the Cyprus U19 team on 20 September 2010, in a friendly game against Romania where he scored a goal as well. On 5 September 2013, he made his debut for Cyprus U21 team in a UEFA Under-21 qualification match against Serbia.

== Personal info ==
His father Kostakis Konstantinou, like his son, played football in England and for Apollon Limassol. He was capped 35 times by Cyprus.

== Honours ==
Apollon Limassol

- Cypriot Cup (1) : 2012–13

APOEL

- Cypriot First Division (1): 2014–15
- Cypriot Cup (1): 2014–15
