= Lewis Wilson (footballer) =

English footballer (born 1993)

Personal information
- Full name: Lewis Anthony Wilson
- Date of birth: 19 February 1993 (age 33)
- Place of birth: Milton Keynes, England
- Height: 6 ft 2 in (1.88 m)
- Position: Forward

Team information
- Current team: Coventry United

Youth career
- 2009–2011: Rushden & Diamonds

Senior career*
Years	Team	Apps	(Gls)
2010–2011	Rushden & Diamonds	0	(0)
2010	→ Newport Pagnell Town (loan)	9	(7)
2011	→ Northampton Spencer (loan)	6	(4)
2011–2012	Newport Pagnell Town	20	(23)
2012–2013	Northampton Town	8	(1)
2012–2013	→ Kettering Town (loan)	15	(11)
2013	→ Bishop's Stortford (loan)	5	(3)
2013	→ Kettering Town (loan)	5	(3)
2013	→ Whitehawk (loan)	1	(0)
2014	Kettering Town	5	(3)
2014–2015	Oxford City	30	(18)
2015–2016	Arlesey Town	16	(12)
2016–2017	AFC Rushden & Diamonds	10	(1)
2017	St Neots Town	5	(1)
2017–2018	Cambridge City	34	(16)
2018–2020	Stratford Town	65	(27)
2020	Banbury United	2	(0)
2020–2021	Kettering Town	24	(5)
2021–2023	Stratford Town	48	(14)
2023	Newport Pagnell Town	10	(5)
2023–2024	Stratford Town	36	(8)
2025	Rugby Borough	0	(0)
2025–2026	Coventry United	34	(2)
Total		388	(164)
- * Club domestic league appearances and goals as of 09:45, 16 July 2026 (UTC) ‡ National team caps and goals as of .

Lewis Anthony Wilson (born 19 February 1993) is an English footballer who last played for Coventry United, as a forward.

== Playing career ==
Wilson joined Rushden & Diamonds after a successful trial in 2009, after he had been spotted playing for Newport Pagnell Town. He started a two-year scholarship and was a regular in the youth team, scoring 16 goals in his first year. In his second year, Wilson featured twice for the first team in the Northamptonshire Senior Cup against Daventry United and Brackley Town. He also joined Newport Pagnell and Northampton Spencer on work-experience. In the summer of 2011, Wilson was released and rejoined UCL Premier side Newport Pagnell Town. He made his debut in August 2011, in a 3–0 defeat to Boston Town. In January 2012, Wilson joined Football League Two side Northampton Town on a contract until the end of the season, after impressing on a one-week trial. He made his debut for the Cobblers on 17 April 2012 in a 3–1 defeat to Crawley Town, coming on as a substitute for Jake Robinson. His first goal and start came in a 1–1 draw with Gillingham. On 30 April, Wilson signed a one-year professional contract. In November 2012, he joined Kettering Town on loan until 2 January 2013.

On 7 August 2018 it was confirmed that Wilson had joined Stratford Town from Cambridge City.

Wilson was confirmed as signing for Southern League Premier Division Central side Banbury United on 27 January 2020. Lewis made his debut on 1 February 2020, as his new side were narrowly beaten 1–0 at home to Bromsgrove Sporting.

Wilson followed his short stint at Banbury with returning spells at Kettering Town, Stratford Town and Newport Pagnell Town. Wilson then was suspended for almost a season due to an FA betting breach investigation from 10 years prior, which also included former Northampton Town teammates Ivan Toney and Dean Snedker. Wilson returned to the game after over a season in October 2025 with United Counties League outfit, Coventry United.
