= Lawson D'Ath =

English semi-professional footballer

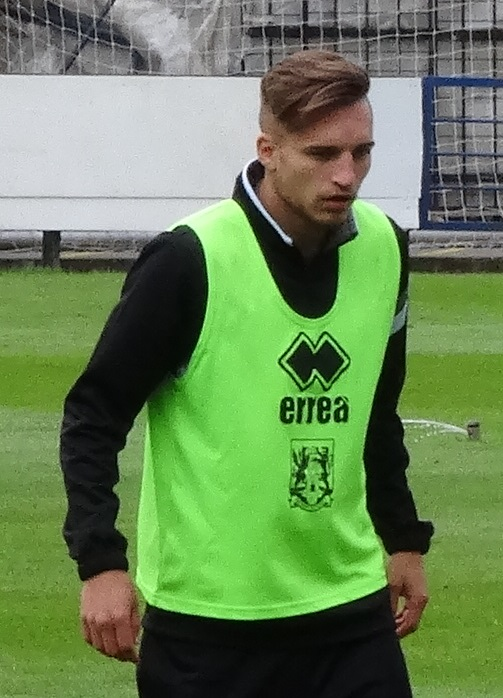
- D'Ath training with Northampton Town in 2014

Personal information
- Full name: Lawson Marc D'Ath
- Date of birth: 24 December 1992 (age 33)
- Place of birth: Witney, England
- Height: 5 ft 9 in (1.75 m)
- Position: Midfielder

Team information
- Current team: Kettering Town

Youth career
- 2005–2010: Reading

Senior career*
| Years | Team | Apps | (Gls) |
| 2010–2014 | Reading | 0 | (0) |
| 2012 | → Yeovil Town (loan) | 14 | (1) |
| 2012–2013 | → Cheltenham Town (loan) | 2 | (1) |
| 2013 | → Exeter City (loan) | 8 | (1) |
| 2013–2014 | → Dagenham & Redbridge (loan) | 21 | (1) |
| 2014–2017 | Northampton Town | 81 | (11) |
| 2017–2018 | Luton Town | 20 | (0) |
| 2018–2019 | Milton Keynes Dons | 15 | (0) |
| 2019–2021 | Yeovil Town | 39 | (0) |
| 2022–2023 | Yeovil Town | 42 | (1) |
| 2023–2024 | Banbury United | 32 | (2) |
| 2024–2026 | Hereford | 67 | (3) |
| 2026– | Kettering Town | 0 | (0) |
- * Club domestic league appearances and goals as of 09:00, 15 June 2026 (UTC)

Lawson Marc D'Ath (born 24 December 1992) is an English footballer who plays as a midfielder for Southern League Premier Division Central club Kettering Town.

== Career ==
=== Reading ===
Born in Witney, Oxfordshire, D'Ath was named in the Reading matchday squad for the first time on 11 August 2010, remaining an unused substitute in their 1–0 win away to Torquay United in the League Cup first round. He signed a new two-year professional contract in April 2011, having scored at a prolific rate for the reserve and academy teams. He made his debut on 7 January 2012 in the third round of the FA Cup at home to Stevenage, coming on as an 87th-minute substitute for Shaun Cummings.

On 9 February 2012, D'Ath joined League One club Yeovil Town on a one-month youth loan. He made his Football League debut in a 3–2 win away to Wycombe Wanderers on 14 February, before scoring his first professional goal in a 3–2 win at home to Colchester United four days later. D'Ath's loan at Yeovil was extended until the end of the season on 11 April. He completed the loan spell with one goal from 14 appearances.

On 25 October 2012, D'Ath joined League Two club Cheltenham Town on a one-month loan. He scored on his debut at home to Exeter City on 27 October, scoring Cheltenham's first goal in a 3–0 victory. D'Ath was later sidelined with a knee injury sustained in an FA Cup victory over Yate Town, which ruled him out for several weeks. Despite this, his loan with Cheltenham was extended on 22 November until 2 January 2013. His loan was not extended further and he finished the spell with one goal from three appearances. On 15 March 2013, D'Ath joined fellow League Two club Exeter City on a one-month loan. He scored on his debut a day later at home to Bradford City, scoring the second goal with a header in a 4–1 victory. D'Ath completed the loan spell with one goal from eight appearances.

On 28 November 2013, D'Ath joined League Two club Dagenham & Redbridge on a one-month loan. He made his debut in a 2–1 defeat away to Oxford United on 14 December, before his loan was extended for a second month on 31 December. D'Ath was sent off a day later after receiving two yellow cards in a 1–0 win at home to AFC Wimbledon. On 29 January 2014, his loan was extended until the end of the season, with manager Wayne Burnett revealing that Reading would continue to pay all of D'Ath's wages. D'Ath completed the loan spell with 21 appearances and one goal. At the end of the season, D'Ath was released by Reading on 12 May 2014. In July 2014, D'Ath trialled with Conference Premier club Bristol Rovers, scoring in a 1–1 draw with Cirencester Town, before he went on trial with former loan club Yeovil Town later that month.

=== Northampton Town ===
On 7 August 2014, D'Ath signed for League Two club Northampton Town on a contract until January 2015 after a successful trial. He scored twice on his debut five days later in a 3–2 win away to Wolverhampton Wanderers in the League Cup first round. D'Ath signed a contract extension with Northampton until 2016 on 24 September, having scored four goals in 10 appearances up to that point in the season. After signing the contract extension, D'Ath said "I know in myself that I need to keep myself going and that I need to keep working hard. The aim for us boys is to go as high as we can and you don't get that without hard work." He finished the season with nine goals from 45 appearances.

D'Ath made his first appearance of 2015–16 after being named in the starting lineup at home to Blackpool in the League Cup first round on 11 August 2015, which saw the team win 3–0. His first goal of the season came with the opener in a 4–2 win away to Morecambe on 19 September. D'Ath suffered a groin strain in a 2–1 win away to Plymouth Argyle on 12 January 2016, and returned to the team for a 4–0 win away to Leyton Orient on 13 February. He signed a new two-and-a-half-year contract with the club a day earlier. D'Ath finished the season with four goals from 46 appearances, as Northampton won the League Two title and promotion to League One.

=== Luton Town ===
On 6 January 2017, D'Ath signed for League Two club Luton Town on a one-and-a-half-year contract for an undisclosed fee, with the option of a further year. He made his Luton debut on 14 January, starting in their 2–1 win away to Crewe Alexandra. D'Ath started in both legs of the play-off semi-final defeat to Blackpool, losing 6–5 on aggregate, and finished 2016–17 with 13 appearances for Luton. He was released by Luton at the end of the 2017–18 season.

=== Milton Keynes Dons ===
D'Ath agreed to sign for newly relegated League Two club Milton Keynes Dons on 20 June 2018 on a one-year contract, effective from 1 July. However, following limited first team opportunities, D'Ath was one of ten players released by the club at the end of the 2018–19 season.

=== Yeovil Town ===
Following a successful trial, on 3 August 2019, D'Ath signed for National League club Yeovil Town on a two-year contract. At the end of the 2020–21 season, D'Ath was released by Yeovil Town but remained at the club post-surgery for rehabilitation.

On 29 January 2022, after completing a period of rehabilitation D'Ath signed a new contract with Yeovil Town. At the end of the 2022–23 season, D'Ath was released by Yeovil following the club's relegation from the National League.

=== Later career ===
On 14 June 2023, D'Ath signed for National League North club Banbury United. On 28 March 2024, D'Ath joined divisional rivals Hereford on a deal until the end of the season. On 2 May 2024, D'Ath agreed to stay at Hereford until the end of the 2024–25 season. He was released by the club at the end of the 2025–26 season. On 14 June 2026, he signed for Southern League Premier Division Central club Kettering Town.

== Career statistics ==
As of end of 2025–26 season

Appearances and goals by club, season and competition
| Club | Season | League | | | FA Cup | | League Cup | | Other | | Total | |
| Club | Season | Division | Apps | Goals | Apps | Goals | Apps | Goals | Apps | Goals | Apps | Goals |
|---|---|---|---|---|---|---|---|---|---|---|---|---|
| Reading | 2010–11 | Championship | 0 | 0 | 0 | 0 | 0 | 0 | 0 | 0 | 0 | 0 |
| Reading | 2011–12 | Championship | 0 | 0 | 1 | 0 | 0 | 0 | — | | 1 | 0 |
| Reading | Total | | 0 | 0 | 1 | 0 | 0 | 0 | 0 | 0 | 1 | 0 |
| Yeovil Town (loan) | 2011–12 | League One | 14 | 1 | — | | — | | — | | 14 | 1 |
| Cheltenham Town (loan) | 2012–13 | League Two | 2 | 1 | 1 | 0 | — | | — | | 3 | 1 |
| Exeter City (loan) | 2012–13 | League Two | 8 | 1 | — | | — | | — | | 8 | 1 |
| Dagenham & Redbridge (loan) | 2013–14 | League Two | 21 | 1 | — | | — | | — | | 21 | 1 |
| Northampton Town | 2014–15 | League Two | 41 | 7 | 1 | 0 | 2 | 2 | 1 (Note: Appearance(s) in Football League Trophy) | 0 | 45 | 9 |
| Northampton Town | 2015–16 | League Two | 39 | 4 | 3 | 0 | 2 | 0 | 2 | 0 | 46 | 4 |
| Northampton Town | 2016–17 | League One | 1 | 0 | 0 | 0 | 1 | 0 | 2 (Note: Appearance(s) in EFL Trophy) | 0 | 4 | 0 |
| Northampton Town | Total | | 81 | 11 | 4 | 0 | 5 | 2 | 5 | 0 | 95 | 13 |
| Luton Town | 2016–17 | League Two | 11 | 0 | 0 | 0 | — | | 2 (Note: Appearances in League Two play-offs) | 0 | 13 | 0 |
| Luton Town | 2017–18 | League Two | 9 | 0 | 0 | 0 | 0 | 0 | 4 | 1 | 13 | 1 |
| Luton Town | Total | | 20 | 0 | 0 | 0 | 0 | 0 | 6 | 1 | 26 | 1 |
| Milton Keynes Dons | 2018–19 | League Two | 15 | 0 | 1 | 0 | 0 | 0 | 1 | 0 | 17 | 0 |
| Yeovil Town | 2019–20 | National League | 25 | 0 | 2 | 1 | — | | 1 (Note: Appearance in FA Trophy) | 0 | 28 | 1 |
| Yeovil Town | 2020–21 | National League | 14 | 0 | 2 | 0 | — | | 0 | 0 | 16 | 0 |
| Yeovil Town | Total | | 39 | 0 | 4 | 1 | — | | 1 | 0 | 44 | 1 |
| Yeovil Town | 2021–22 | National League | 17 | 1 | 0 | 0 | — | | 1 (Note: Appearance(s) in Somerset Premier Cup) | 0 | 18 | 1 |
| Yeovil Town | 2022–23 | National League | 25 | 0 | 0 | 0 | — | | 1 | 0 | 26 | 0 |
| Yeovil Town | Total | | 42 | 1 | 0 | 0 | — | | 2 | 0 | 44 | 1 |
| Banbury United | 2023–24 | National League North | 32 | 2 | 1 | 0 | — | | 1 | 0 | 34 | 2 |
| Hereford | 2023–24 | National League North | 4 | 0 | — | | — | | — | | 4 | 0 |
| Hereford | 2024–25 | National League North | 32 | 1 | 3 | 0 | — | | 1 | 0 | 36 | 1 |
| Hereford | 2025–26 | National League North | 31 | 2 | 0 | 0 | — | | 3 | 1 | 34 | 3 |
| Hereford | Total | | 67 | 3 | 3 | 0 | — | | 4 | 1 | 74 | 4 |
| Career total | | | 341 | 21 | 15 | 1 | 5 | 2 | 20 | 2 | 380 | 26 |

== Honours ==
Northampton Town

- Football League Two: 2015–16

Milton Keynes Dons

- EFL League Two third-place promotion: 2018–19
