= Paul Walker (footballer, born 1992) =

Footballer (born 1992)

Personal information
- Date of birth: 18 April 1992 (age 34)
- Place of birth: Cambridge, England
- Position: Goalkeeper

Youth career
- 2008–2010: Northampton Town

Senior career*
Years	Team	Apps	(Gls)
2010–2012	Northampton Town	1	(0)
2011	→ Brackley Town (loan)	7	(0)
2012–	Corby Town	138	(0)

International career
2008–2010	Wales U17	2	(0)
- * Club domestic league appearances and goals as of 17:54, 22 March 2013 (UTC)

Paul Walker (born 18 April 1992) is a footballer who plays as a goalkeeper. Born in England, he made two appearances for the Wales U17 national team.

== Career ==
Walker was the latest in the production line of young goalkeepers at Sixfields following Mark Bunn and Chris Dunn. Walker, along with Alex Konstantinou and Michael Jacobs, were awarded professional contracts for the 2010-11 season. He made his Football League debut on 25 April 2011 as a second-half substitute for Steve Collis in a match against Stockport County.

On 31 January 2011 Walker and teammate Ashley Corker were released by mutual consent from the Cobblers.

== International career ==
He has played for the Wales national under-17 football team, having been capped twice and has been called up to the Under 19 national team.
