= Dean Snedker =

English footballer (born 1994)

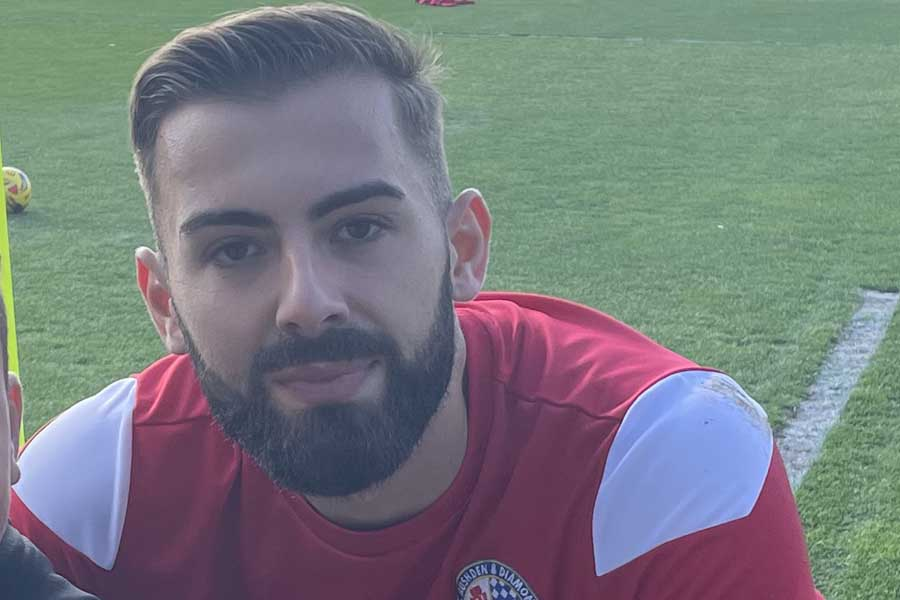
- Snedker in October 2022

Personal information
- Full name: Dean Snedker
- Date of birth: 17 November 1994 (age 31)
- Place of birth: Northampton, England
- Height: 6 ft 2 in (1.88 m)
- Position: Goalkeeper

Team information
- Current team: Wellingborough Town

Youth career
- 2008–2012: Northampton Town

Senior career*
Years	Team	Apps	(Gls)
2012–2015	Northampton Town	3	(0)
2013	→ Carshalton Athletic (loan)	19	(0)
2013–2014	→ Banbury United (loan)	5	(0)
2014–2015	→ Brackley Town (loan)	12	(0)
2015	Brackley Town	8	(0)
2015–2016	Kidderminster Harriers	30	(0)
2016	Nuneaton Town	1	(0)
2016	Hemel Hempstead Town	0	(0)
2016–2017	Kettering Town	14	(0)
2017	Cambridge City	17	(0)
2017–2020	St Albans City	119	(0)
2020–2021	Hemel Hempstead Town	9	(0)
2021–2023	AFC Rushden & Diamonds	79	(0)
2023	Coalville Town	2	(0)
2025–	Wellingborough Town	55	(0)

International career^{‡}
2013	England U19	1	(0)
- * Club domestic league appearances and goals as of 15:00, 8 October 2026 (UTC) ‡ National team caps and goals as of 15:00, 10 December 2023 (UTC)

Dean Snedker (born 17 November 1994) is an English footballer who currently plays for Northern Premier League Division One Midlands side Wellingborough Town. He plays as a goalkeeper.

== Club career ==
=== Northampton Town ===
Born in Northampton, Snedker started a two-year scholarship with Northampton Town in July 2011 after coming through their youth system. His professional debut for Northampton came on 14 August 2012, in a 2–1 victory over Cardiff City in the Football League Cup. He signed his first professional contract with the club in August 2012.

He joined Carshalton Athletic on a month-long loan in September 2013. His loan was extended by a further month in October 2013.

He joined Banbury United in December 2013 on a month-long loan.

On 6 August 2014, Snedker joined Conference North side Brackley Town on loan until January 2015. Snedker was recalled from the loan on 15 September 2014, as cover for the injured Matt Duke. He rejoined them on a short-term loan in November 2014.

=== Further Career ===
In February 2015, Snedker had his contract terminated by Northampton Town, and subsequently signed for Brackley Town, before leaving in the summer.

In July 2015, Snedker signed for Kidderminster Harriers following a successful trial. He appeared in 30 league matches across the 2015–16 league season.

In August 2016, Snedker signed for National League North side Nuneaton Town, and made one appearance for the club.Snedker then signed for Hemel Hempstead Town in September 2016. He joined Kettering Town on dual registration in October 2016. In 2017, Snedker signed for Southern League Premier Division side Cambridge City.

He joined National League South side St Albans City in June 2017. Snedker became a fan favourite very quickly for the Saints and then he went on to make 119 league appearances for the club over the following three seasons, before leaving the club in 2020. He rejoined fellow National League South side Hemel Hempstead Town in October 2020.

=== AFC Rushden & Diamonds ===
On 9 August 2021, Southern League Premier Division Central side AFC Rushden & Diamonds announced the signings of Snedker and Dean Dummett ahead of the 2021–22 season. Snedker made his Southern League Premier Division Central debut for AFC Rushden & Diamonds on 18 August 2021, in a home fixture against Banbury United. The visitors won the match 2–0. On 19 January 2022, it was confirmed that Snedker had signed a contract and committed to AFC Rushden & Diamonds for the remainder of the 2021–22 season. On 22 July 2022, Dean signed forms to remain with the club for the 2022–23 season. After collecting the club's Player's Player of the Year and Supporters Player of the Year awards for 2022-23, Snedker left AFC Rushden and Diamonds that summer. In total he made 97 appearances across all competitions, 79 of which were league matches.

=== Coalville Town ===
Snedker subsequently played two games for Coalville Town as emergency cover while they waited for international clearance to sign Tom Carter.

=== Betting Ban ===
Snedker then was suspended for almost a season due to an FA betting breach investigation from 10 years prior, which also included former Northampton Town teammates Ivan Toney and Lewis Wilson. The FA investigation found the trio collectively bet on 223 matches, but crucially did not bet on any of their team's matches or any matches in League 2, which was the league the trio were playing in at the time. They were found to have purely breached FA rules on football betting as a professional player.

=== Wellingborough Town ===
Snedker returned to the game after over a season for the start of the 2025/26 season with Northern Premier League Division One Midlands side Wellingborough Town.

== International career ==
He was called up to the England under-19 team in January 2013, and made his debut for them the following month in 3–1 victory over Denmark.

== Statistics ==
As of 23 April 2022

Club	Season	League			FA Cup		EFL Cup		Other		Total	
Club	Season	Division	Apps	Goals	Apps	Goals	Apps	Goals	Apps	Goals	Apps	Goals
Northampton Town	2012–13	League Two	0	0	0	0	2	0	1 (Note: One appearance in EFL Trophy)	0	3	0
Northampton Town	2013–14	League Two	0	0	0	0	0	0	0	0	0	0
Carshalton Athletic (loan)	2013–14	Isthmian League Premier Division	19	0	0	0	—		0	0	19	0
Banbury United (loan)	2013–14	Southern League Premier Division	5	0	0	0	—		0	0	5	0
Northampton Town	2014–15	League Two	0	0	0	0	0	0	0	0	0	0
Brackley Town (loan)	2014–15	Conference North	8	0	0	0	—		0	0	8	0
Brackley Town (loan)	2014–15	Conference North	4	0	0	0	—		0	0	4	0
Brackley Town	2014–15	Conference North	8	0	0	0	—		0	0	8	0
Kidderminster Harriers	2015–16	National League	30	0	0	0	—		1 (Note: Appearance(s) in FA Trophy)	0	31	0
Nuneaton Town	2016–17	National League North	1	0	0	0	—		0	0	1	0
Hemel Hempstead Town	2016–17	National League South	0	0	0	0	—		0	0	0	0
Kettering Town	2016–17	Southern League Premier Division	14	0	1	0	—		3 (Note: Two appearances in FA Trophy) (Note: One appearance in Northamptonshire Senior Cup)	0	18	0
Cambridge City	2016–17	Southern League Premier Division	17	0	0	0	—		2 (Note: Two appearances in Cambridgeshire Invitation Cup)	0	19	0
St Albans City	2017–18	National League South	42	0	4	0	—		3	0	49	0
St Albans City	2018–19	National League South	42	0	3	0	—		6 (Note: Two appearances in FA Trophy) (Note: Four appearances in Hertfordshire Senior Cup)	0	51	0
St Albans City	2019–20	National League South	35	0	3	0	—		3 (Note: One appearance in Hertfordshire Charity Cup) (Note: One appearance in Hertfordshire Senior Cup) (Note: One appearance in FA Trophy)	0	41	0
St Albans City	Total		119	0	10	0	0	0	12	0	141	0
Hemel Hempstead Town	2020–21	National League South	9	0	1	0	—		2	0	12	0
AFC Rushden & Diamonds	2021–22	Southern League Premier Division Central	40	0	1	0	—		5 (Note: One appearance in Southern League Cup) (Note: One appearance in FA Trophy) (Note: Three appearances in Northamptonshire Senior Cup)	0	46	0
AFC Rushden & Diamonds	2022–23	Southern League Premier Division Central	0	0	0	0	—		0	0	0	0
Coalville Town	2023–24	Southern League Division One	2	0	0	0	—		0	0	0	0
Wellingborough Town	2025–26	Northern Premier League Division One	42	0	2	0	—		1	0	45	0
Career total			318	0	15	0	2	0	26	0	361	0
