= 2012–13 Northampton Town F.C. season =

Northampton Town F.C.
2012–13 season
- Chairman: David Cardoza
- Manager: Aidy Boothroyd
- Stadium: Sixfields Stadium
- League Two: 6th
- Play-offs: Runners-up
- FA Cup: First round
- League Cup: Second round
- League Trophy: Quarter-finals
- Top goalscorer: League: Adebayo Akinfenwa (16); All: Adebayo Akinfenwa (17)
- Highest home attendance: 7,471 vs Barnet
- Lowest home attendance: 1,561 vs Colchester United
- Average home league attendance: 4,785

The 2012–13 season was Northampton Town's 116th season in their history and the fourth successive season in League Two. Alongside competing in League Two, the club also participated in the FA Cup, League Cup and Football League Trophy.

== Players ==
As of match played 18 May 2013.

No.	Name	Position	Nat.	Place of birth	Date of birth (age)	Apps	Goals	Previous club	Date signed	Fee
Goalkeepers
13	Dean Snedker	GK	(England)	Northampton	17 November 1994 (aged 18)	3	0	Academy	1 June 2011	N/A
21	Lee Nicholls	GK	(England)	Huyton	5 October 1992 (aged 20)	51	0	Wigan Athletic	6 August 2012	Loan
Defenders
2	John Johnson	RB	(England)	Middlesbrough	16 September 1988 (aged 24)	151	14	Middlesbrough	23 July 2010	Free
3	Joe Widdowson	LB	(England)	Forest Gate	28 March 1989 (aged 24)	47	0	Rochdale	5 July 2012	Free
5	Kelvin Langmead	CB	(England)	Coventry	23 March 1985 (aged 28)	92	12	Peterborough United	6 January 2012	Free
6	Lee Collins	CB	(England)	Telford	28 September 1988 (aged 24)	18	0	Barnsley	8 February 2013	Free
12	Ben Tozer	U	(England)	Plymouth	1 March 1990 (aged 23)	139	7	Newcastle United	23 June 2011	Free
15	Nathan Cameron	CB	(England)	Birmingham	21 November 1991 (aged 21)	6	0	Coventry City	26 March 2013	Loan
18	David Artell	CB	(England)	Rotherham	22 November 1980 (aged 32)	13	4	Port Vale	13 August 2012	Free
30	Clarke Carlisle	CB	(England)	Preston	14 October 1979 (aged 33)	47	4	York City	4 January 2013	Free
Midfielders
4	Luke Guttridge	CM	(England)	Barnstaple	27 March 1982 (aged 31)	112	14	Aldershot Town	27 January 2012	Free
7	Ishmel Demontagnac	W	(England)	Newham	15 June 1988 (aged 24)	33	2	Notts County	27 June 2012	Free
8	Ben Harding	CM	(England)	Carshalton	6 September 1984 (aged 28)	60	2	Wycombe Wanderers	31 January 2012	Free
11	Chris Hackett	W	(England)	Oxford	1 March 1983 (aged 30)	49	6	Millwall	3 July 2012	Free
16	Lewis Wilson	AM	(England)	Milton Keynes	19 February 1993 (aged 20)	10	1	Newport Pagnell Town	31 January 2012	Free
22	Lewis Hornby	CM	(England)	Northampton	25 April 1995 (aged 18)	29	0	Academy	10 December 2011	N/A
24	Paul Turnbull	CM	(England)	Handforth	23 January 1989 (aged 24)	19	1	Stockport County	29 June 2011	Free
25	Claudio Dias	W	(England)	Milton Keynes	10 November 1994 (aged 18)	1	0	Academy	1 July 2012	N/A
29	David Moyo	W	(Zimbabwe)	Bulawayo	17 December 1994 (aged 18)	6	0	Academy	25 October 2012	N/A
Forwards
9	Clive Platt	FW	(England)	Wolverhampton	27 October 1977 (aged 35)	41	7	Coventry City	25 May 2012	Free
10	Adebayo Akinfenwa	FW	(England)	Islington	10 May 1982 (aged 31)	188	74	Gillingham	25 May 2011	Free
14	Alex Nicholls	FW	(England)	Stourbridge	9 December 1987 (aged 25)	19	8	Walsall	1 June 2012	Free
17	Jake Robinson	FW	(England)	Brighton	23 October 1986 (aged 26)	61	5	Shrewsbury Town	8 June 2011	Free
19	Louis Moult	FW	(England)	Stoke-on-Trent	14 May 1992 (aged 21)	17	2	Stoke City	17 August 2012	Free
27	Ivan Toney	FW	(England)	Northampton	16 March 1996 (aged 17)	1	0	Academy	13 November 2012	N/A
28	Roy O'Donovan	FW	(Republic of Ireland)	Cork	10 August 1985 (aged 27)	19	6	Coventry City	31 January 2013	Free

== Pre-season ==
21 July 2012	Corby Town	2–1	Northampton Town	Corby
15:00 BST	Miller 18', 42'		J.Robinson 69' (pen.)	Stadium: Steel Park; Attendance: 830

25 July 2012	Cogenhoe	0–4	Northampton Town	Cogenhoe
19:45 BST			A.Akinfenwa 14'; M.Hoganson 34', 56'; A.Nicholls 77'	Stadium: Compton Park; Attendance: tbc

28 July 2012	Northampton Town	0–2	Chelsea U21s	Northampton
15:00 BST			A.Kiwomya 63', 79'	Stadium: Sixfields Stadium; Attendance: 1,527

31 July 2012	Northampton Town	3–4	Derby	Northampton
19:30 BST	B.Harding 42'; K.Langmead 87'; C.Hackett 90' (pen.)		M.Bennett 34'; T.Robinson 38', 65'; J.Ward 84'	Stadium: Sixfields Stadium; Attendance: 1,726

4 August 2012	Northampton Town	1–3	Tottenham Hotspur XI	Northampton
15:00 BST	K.Langmead 90'		J.Bostock 5'; S.Coulibaly 51', 57'	Stadium: Sixfields Stadium; Attendance: 1,268

7 August 2012	Northampton Town	3–1	West Ham XI	Northampton
19:45 BST	C.Platt 10'; K.Langmead 66'; A.Nicholls 82'		S.Baldock 50'	Stadium: Sixfields Stadium; Attendance: 1,414

== Competitions ==
=== Football League Two ===
==== League table ====
Pos	Team	Pld	W	D	L	GF	GA	GD	Pts	Promotion, qualification or relegation
4	Burton Albion	46	22	10	14	71	65	+6	76	Qualification for League Two play-offs (Note: Four teams play for one spot and promotion to Football League One.)
5	Cheltenham Town	46	20	15	11	58	51	+7	75	Qualification for League Two play-offs
6	Northampton Town	46	21	10	15	64	55	+9	73	Qualification for League Two play-offs
7	Bradford City (O, P)	46	18	15	13	63	52	+11	69	Qualification for League Two play-offs
8	Chesterfield	46	18	13	15	60	45	+15	67	

Updated to match(es) played on 27 April 2013. Source: BBC Sport
Rules for classification: 1) Points; 2) Goal difference; 3) Number of goals scored
(O) Play-off winners; (P) Promoted

==== Results summary ====
Overall								Home						Away					
Pld	W	D	L	GF	GA	GD	Pts	W	D	L	GF	GA	GD	W	D	L	GF	GA	GD
46	21	10	15	64	55	+9	73	17	2	4	41	16	+25	4	8	11	23	39	−16

Last updated: 1 June 2013.

==== League position by match ====
Round	1	2	3	4	5	6	7	8	9	10	11	12	13	14	15	16	17	18	19	20	21	22	23	24	25	26	27	28	29	30	31	32	33	34	35	36	37	38	39	40	41	42	43	44	45	46
Ground	A	H	H	A	H	A	A	H	A	H	A	H	A	H	H	A	A	H	H	A	H	A	H	H	H	A	H	A	A	A	H	A	A	H	H	A	H	A	H	H	A	A	H	A	A	H
Result	D	W	D	L	W	L	W	D	D	L	L	W	L	L	W	D	W	W	W	L	L	D	W	W	W	L	W	W	L	L	W	W	D	W	W	L	W	D	W	W	L	L	L	D	D	W
Position	12	6	9	13	8	12	7	9	13	13	15	12	12	17	14	14	12	11	9	10	12	13	9	10	9	10	6	3	4	8	6	7	6	4	4	5	4	4	4	3	3	3	6	6	6	6

Source: Northampton Town F.C.
A = Away; H = Home; W = Win; D = Draw; L = Loss

==== Matches ====
Win Draw Loss

18 August 2012 1	Rochdale	0–0	Northampton Town	Rochdale
15:00 BST		Report		Stadium: Spotland Stadium; Attendance: 2,558; Referee: Tony Harrington

21 August 2012 2	Northampton Town	2–1	Rotherham United	Northampton
19:45 BST	C.Hackett 26'; A.Nicholls 85'	Report	B.Pringle 42'	Stadium: Sixfields Stadium; Attendance: 4,171; Referee: Trevor Kettle

25 August 2012 3	Northampton Town	3–3	Southend United	Northampton
15:00 BST	A.Akinfenwa 65'; D.Artell 82'; A.Nicholls 86'	Report	B.Assombalonga 57'; K.Ferdinand 78'; R.Cresswell 90+4'	Stadium: Sixfields Stadium; Attendance: 4,562; Referee: Stephen Martin

1 September 2012 4	Plymouth Argyle	3–2	Northampton Town	Plymouth
15:00 BST	W.Feeney 47'; R.Giffiths 59'; C.Nelson 74'	Report	A.Nicholls 26'; D.Artell 90+3'	Stadium: Home Park; Attendance: 6,037; Referee: Andy Davies

8 September 2012 5	Northampton Town	2–0	AFC Wimbledon	Northampton
15:00 BST	A.Nicholls 60'; C.Hackett 72'	Report		Stadium: Sixfields Stadium; Attendance: 4,235; Referee: Scott Duncan

15 September 2012 6	Fleetwood Town	1–0	Northampton Town	Fleetwood
15:00 BST	A.Mangan 90+3'	Report	D.East (red card) 24'	Stadium: Highbury Stadium; Attendance: 3,027; Referee: Steven Rushton

18 September 2012 7	Dagenham & Redbridge	0–1	Northampton Town	Dagenham, London
19:45 BST		Report	A.Akinfenwa 50'	Stadium: Victoria Road; Attendance: 1,429; Referee: Mike Russell

22 September 2012 8	Northampton Town	0–0	Chesterfield	Northampton
15:00 BST		Report		Stadium: Sixfields Stadium; Attendance: 4,709; Referee: Jeremy Simpson

29 September 2012 9	Burton Albion	3–3	Northampton Town	Burton-upon-Trent
15:00 BST	C.Zola 9'; K.Langmead 60' (o.g.); Z.Diamond 80'	Report	K.Langmead 63'; D.Artell 75'; A.Nicholls 83'	Stadium: Pirelli Stadium; Attendance: 2,857; Referee: Brendan Malone

2 October 2012 10	Northampton Town	1–2	Gillingham	Northampton
19:45 BST	A.Akinfenwa 82'	Report	D.Burton 44'; J.Payne 55'	Stadium: Sixfields Stadium; Attendance: 3,648; Referee: Simon Hooper

2 October 2012 11	Bristol Rovers	3–1	Northampton Town	Bristol
15:00 BST	T.Eaves 53'; G.Kenneth 57'; O.Norburn 84'	Report	A.Charles (red card) 24'; A.Akinfenwa 75'	Stadium: Memorial Stadium; Attendance: 5,166; Referee: Mark Brown

13 October 2012 12	Northampton Town	3–0	Exeter City	Northampton
15:00 BST	A.Akinfenwa 25'; K.Langmead 39'; A.Nicholls 84'	Report		Stadium: Sixfields Stadium; Attendance: 4,607; Referee: Darren Bond

19 October 2012 13	Barnet	4–0	Northampton Town	Barnet, London
20:00 BST	K.Pearce 56'; A.Yiadom 65'; J.Oster 90'; A.Edgar 90+2'	Report		Stadium: Underhill Stadium; Attendance: 2,721; Referee: Darren Sheldrake

23 October 2012 14	Northampton Town	0–1	Bradford City	Northampton
19:45 BST		Report	N.Wells 53'	Stadium: Sixfields Stadium; Attendance: 3,541; Referee: Graham Scott

27 October 2012 15	Northampton Town	2–0	Port Vale	Northampton
14:00 BST	A.Nicholls 20'; L.Moult 43'	Report		Stadium: Sixfields Stadium; Attendance: 5,061; Referee: Richard Clark

6 November 2012 16	York City	1–1	Northampton Town	York
19:45 GMT	M.Blair 23'	Report	L.Moult (red card) 42'; A.Akinfenwa 58'	Stadium: Bootham Crescent; Attendance: 3,039; Referee: Nigel Miller

11 November 2012 17	Accrington Stanley	2–4	Northampton Town	Accrington
15:00 GMT	G.Miller 37'; R.Boco 57'	Report	A.Akinfenwa 17', 69', 76'; J.Robinson 67'	Stadium: Crown Ground; Attendance: 1,441; Referee: Andy Madley

17 November 2012 18	Northampton Town	3–1	Wycombe Wanderers	Northampton
15:00 GMT	A.Akinfenwa 24', 61' (pen.); C.Hackett 65'	Report	J.Grant 72' (pen.)	Stadium: Sixfields Stadium; Attendance: 4,764; Referee: Paul Tierney

20 November 2012 19	Northampton Town	3–0	Morecambe	Northampton
19:45 GMT	A.Akinfenwa 56'; K.Ellison 61' (o.g.); I.Demontagnac 90'	Report		Stadium: Sixfields Stadium; Attendance: 4,013; Referee: Iain Williamson

24 November 2012 20	Oxford United	2–1	Northampton Town	Oxford
15:00 GMT	J.Constable 15'; JP.Pittman 79'	Report	C.Platt 76'; C.Carlisle (red card) 89'	Stadium: Kassam Stadium; Attendance: 6,635; Referee: Scott Mathieson

8 December 2012 21	Northampton Town	2–3	Cheltenham Town	Northampton
15:00 GMT	A.Akinfenwa 2'; B.Jones 13' (o.g.)	Report	D.Carter 24'; C.Zebroski 27'; D.Duffy 80'	Stadium: Sixfields Stadium; Attendance: 4,625; Referee: Andy Davies

15 December 2012 22	Torquay United	1–1	Northampton Town	Torquay
15:00 GMT	R.Jarvis 62'	Report	K.Langmead 90+1'	Stadium: Plainmoor; Attendance: 2,302; Referee: Chris Sarginson

22 December 2012 23	Northampton Town	2–0	Aldershot Town	Northampton
14:00 GMT	J.Robinson 49'; C.Platt 90+3'	Report		Stadium: Sixfields Stadium; Attendance: 4,574; Referee: Tim Robinson

1 January 2013 24	Northampton Town	3–1	Dagenham & Redbridge	Northampton
15:00 GMT	A.Ogogo 36' (o.g.); C.Hackett 39'; K.Langmead 52'	Report	S.Doe 71'	Stadium: Sixfields Stadium; Attendance: 4,368; Referee: Jeremy Simpson

5 January 2013 25	Northampton Town	3–1	Fleetwood Town	Northampton
15:00 GMT	J.Robinson 7', 41'; C.Platt 53'	Report	J.Allen 90+2'	Stadium: Sixfields Stadium; Attendance: 4,381; Referee: Rob Lewis

12 January 2013 26	Chesterfield	3–0	Northampton Town	Chesterfield
15:00 GMT	J.O'Shea 18'; M.Richards 19', 25'	Report		Stadium: B2net Stadium; Attendance: 5,467; Referee: Stuart Attwell

19 January 2013 27	Northampton Town	1–0	Burton Albion	Northampton
15:00 GMT	A.Akinfenwa 69'	Report		Stadium: Sixfields Stadium; Attendance: 4,090; Referee: Darren Bond

22 January 2013 28	Aldershot Town	1–2	Northampton Town	Aldershot
19:45 GMT	D.López 2'	Report	C.Hackett 21' (pen.); C.Carlisle 35'	Stadium: Recreation Ground; Attendance: 1,191; Referee: Darren Deadman

29 January 2013 29	Gillingham	2–0	Northampton Town	Gillingham
19:45 GMT	C.McDonald 4'; M.Weston 84'	Report		Stadium: Priestfield Stadium; Attendance: 5,600; Referee: Graham Salisbury

2 February 2013 30	Rotherham United	3–1	Northampton Town	Rotherham
15:00 GMT	D.Nardiello 42' (pen.); B.Pringle 75'; D.Noble 79'	Report	C.Carlisle 90+3'	Stadium: New York Stadium; Attendance: 7,739; Referee: Nigel Miller

9 February 2013 31	Northampton Town	3–1	Rochdale	Northampton
15:00 GMT	C.Platt 32'; K.Langmead 69'; A.Akinfenwa 76' (pen.)	Report	J.Kennedy 65'	Stadium: Sixfields Stadium; Attendance: 5,110; Referee: James Linington

16 February 2013 32	Southend United	1–2	Northampton Town	Southend-on-Sea
15:00 GMT	M.Lund 65'; B.Mohsni (red card) 27'	Report	R.O'Donovan 11'; K.Langmead 90'	Stadium: Roots Hall; Attendance: 5,406; Referee: Graham Scott

19 February 2013 33	AFC Wimbledon	1–1	Northampton Town	Kingston-upon-Thames, London
19:45 GMT	A.Bennett 28'	Report	A.Akinfenwa 76' (pen.)	Stadium: Kingsmeadow; Attendance: 4,129; Referee: Fred Graham

23 February 2013 34	Northampton Town	1–0	Plymouth Argyle	Northampton
15:00 GMT	C.Platt 72'	Report		Stadium: Sixfields Stadium; Attendance: 5,382; Referee: David Phillips

26 February 2013 35	Northampton Town	1–0	Bristol Rovers	Northampton
19:45 GMT	B.Harding 88'	Report		Stadium: Sixfields Stadium; Attendance: 4,077; Referee: Gavin Ward

2 March 2013 36	Exeter City	3–0	Northampton Town	Exeter
15:00 GMT	L.Nicholls 22' (o.g.); J.Cureton 59'; J.Gosling 83'	Report		Stadium: St James Park; Attendance: 4,666; Referee: Tim Robinson

9 March 2013 37	Northampton Town	2–0	Accrington Stanley	Northampton
15:00 GMT	C.Hackett 9'; R.O'Donovan 39'	Report		Stadium: Sixfields Stadium; Attendance: 4,746; Referee: Stuart Attwell

9 March 2013 38	Morecambe	1–1	Northampton Town	Morecambe
19:45 GMT	J.Redshaw 57'	Report	K.Langmead 89'	Stadium: Globe Arena; Attendance: 1,366; Referee: Chris Sarginson

23 March 2013 39	Northampton Town	1–0	Oxford United	Northampton
15:00 GMT	B.Harding 45'	Report		Stadium: Sixfields Stadium; Attendance: 6,151; Referee: David Webb

29 March 2013 40	Northampton Town	1–0	Torquay United	Northampton
19:45 GMT	R.O'Donovan 85'	Report		Stadium: Sixfields Stadium; Attendance: 5,166; Referee: Darren Sheldrake

1 April 2013 41	Cheltenham Town	1–0	Northampton Town	Cheltenham
15:00 BST	S.Elliott 44'	Report		Stadium: Whaddon Road; Attendance: 4,042; Referee: Lee Collins

6 April 2013 42	Bradford City	1–0	Northampton Town	Bradford
15:00 BST	N.Wells 23'	Report		Stadium: Valley Parade; Attendance: 10,389; Referee: Trevor Kettle

13 April 2013 43	Northampton Town	0–2	York City	Northampton
15:00 BST		Report	A.Chambers 7'; J.Johnson 85'	Stadium: Sixfields Stadium; Attendance: 6,608; Referee: Gary Sutton

16 April 2013 44	Wycombe Wanderers	0–0	Northampton Town	High Wycombe
19:45 BST		Report		Stadium: Adams Park; Attendance: 3,615; Referee: Brendan Malone

20 April 2013 45	Port Vale	2–2	Northampton Town	Burslem
15:00 BST	L.Chilvers 86'; L.Collins 86' (o.g.)	Report	C.Carlisle 2'; R.O'Donovan 69'	Stadium: Vale Park; Attendance: 12,496; Referee: Keith Hill

27 April 2013 46	Northampton Town	2–0	Barnet	Northampton
15:00 BST	R.O'Donovan 67'; L.Guttridge 73'	Report		Stadium: Sixfields Stadium; Attendance: 7,471; Referee: Andy Haines

==== Play-offs ====
2 May 2013 Semi-final 1st leg	Northampton Town	1–0	Cheltenham Town	Northampton
19:45 BST	R.O'Donovan 26'	Report		Stadium: Sixfields Stadium; Attendance: 6,563; Referee: Mike Russell

5 May 2013 Semi-final 2nd leg	Cheltenham Town	0–1 (0–2 agg.)	Northampton Town	Cheltenham
18:45 BST		Report	L.Guttridge 28'	Stadium: Whaddon Road; Attendance: 5,955; Referee: Andy Madley

18 May 2013 Final	Bradford City	3–0	Northampton Town	London
13:30 BST	J.Hanson 15'; R.McArdle 19'; N.Wells 28'	Report		Stadium: Wembley Stadium; Attendance: 47,127; Referee: Keith Stroud

=== FA Cup ===
3 November 2012 First round	Northampton Town	1–1	Bradford City	Northampton
15:00 GMT	L.Moult 61'	Report	W.Atkinson 32'	Stadium: Sixfields Stadium; Attendance: 2,512; Referee: Geoff Eltringham

13 November 2012 First round	Bradford City	3–3 (a.e.t.) (4–2 p)	Northampton Town	Bradford
19:45 GMT	W.Atkinson 35'; N.Wells 90' (pen.); C.McHugh 120'	Report	I.Demontagnac 43' (pen.); C.Platt 90+2'; K.Langmead 109'	Stadium: Valley Parade; Attendance: 2,951; Referee: Mike Russell
	Penalties
	N.Wells (penalty missed); G.Jones (penalty scored); W.Atkinson (penalty scored); S.Darby (penalty scored); R.Ravenhill (penalty scored)		(penalty scored) C.Platt; (penalty missed) D.East; (penalty missed) K.Langmead; (penalty scored) L.Hornby

=== EFL Cup ===
14 August 2012 First round	Northampton Town	2–1	Cardiff City	Northampton
19:45 BST	D.Artell 37'; A.Nicholls 48'	Report	H.Helguson 4' (pen.)	Stadium: Sixfields Stadium; Attendance: 2,819; Referee: David Phillips

30 August 2012 Second round	Northampton Town	1–3	Wolverhampton Wanderers	Northampton
19:45 BST	C.Platt 40'	Report	D.Batth 16'; F.Nouble 45'; B.Sako 90'	Stadium: Sixfields Stadium; Attendance: 3,758; Referee: Darren Deadman

=== EFL Trophy ===
4 September 2012 First round (s)	Northampton Town	1–0	Milton Keynes Dons	Northampton
19:45 BST	J.Robinson 11'	Report		Stadium: Sixfields Stadium; Attendance: 3,444; Referee: Carl Berry

9 October 2012 Second round (s)	Northampton Town	2–1	Colchester United	Northampton
19:45 BST	A.Akinfenwa 51' (pen.); H.Mukendi 53'	Report	F.Sears 31'	Stadium: Sixfields Stadium; Attendance: 1,561; Referee: Oliver Langford

5 December 2012 Quarter-final (s)	Northampton Town	0–3	Leyton Orient	Northampton
19:45 GMT		Report	D.Mooney 57', 65'; M.Symes 73' (pen.)	Stadium: Sixfields Stadium; Attendance: 1,752; Referee: Mark Haywood

=== Appearances, goals and cards ===
No.	Pos	Player	League Two			FA Cup			League Cup			League Trophy			Play-offs			Total			Discipline	
No.	Pos	Player	Starts	Sub	Goals	Starts	Sub	Goals	Starts	Sub	Goals	Starts	Sub	Goals	Starts	Sub	Goals	Starts	Sub	Goals	Yellow card	Red card
2	RB	John Johnson	16	4	–	1	–	–	1	–	–	–	–	–	1	1	–	19	5	–	3	–
3	LB	Joe Widdowson	39	–	–	2	–	–	2	–	–	3	–	–	–	1	–	46	1	–	14	–
4	CM	Luke Guttridge	20	5	1	–	–	–	2	–	–	–	–	–	3	–	1	25	5	2	8	–
5	CB	Kelvin Langmead	39	–	7	2	–	1	2	–	–	3	–	–	–	1	–	46	1	8	3	–
6	CB	Lee Collins	13	2	–	–	–	–	–	–	–	–	–	–	3	–	–	16	2	–	2	–
7	LM	Ishmel Demontagnac	17	10	1	1	–	1	–	–	–	3	–	–	2	–	–	23	10	2	10	–
8	CM	Ben Harding	35	–	2	–	–	–	2	–	–	1	–	–	3	–	–	41	–	2	3	–
9	ST	Clive Platt	25	10	5	1	1	1	2	–	1	1	–	–	1	–	–	30	11	7	5	–
10	ST	Adebayo Akinfenwa	30	11	16	1	1	–	–	2	–	2	1	1	2	1	–	35	16	17	6	–
11	RM	Chris Hackett	39	2	6	1	–	–	2	–	–	1	1	–	3	–	–	46	3	6	7	–
12	U	Ben Tozer	45	1	–	2	–	–	2	–	–	3	–	–	3	–	–	55	1	–	5	–
13	GK	Dean Snedker	–	–	–	–	–	–	2	–	–	–	1	–	–	–	–	2	1	–	–	–
14	ST	Alex Nicholls	15	–	7	–	–	–	2	–	1	1	1	–	–	–	–	18	1	8	2	–
15	CB	Nathan Cameron	2	1	–	–	–	–	–	–	–	–	–	–	3	–	–	5	1	–	–	–
16	AM	Lewis Wilson	2	2	–	1	–	–	–	–	–	–	2	–	–	–	–	3	4	–	–	–
17	ST	Jake Robinson	13	12	4	–	–	–	–	–	–	2	–	1	–	–	–	15	12	5	5	–
18	CB	David Artell	10	–	3	–	–	–	2	–	1	1	–	–	–	–	–	13	–	4	2	–
19	ST	Louis Moult	4	9	1	1	–	1	–	1	–	2	–	–	–	–	–	7	10	2	–	1
21	GK	Lee Nicholls	46	–	–	–	–	–	–	–	–	2	–	–	3	–	–	51	–	–	3	–
22	CM	Lewis Hornby	19	6	–	1	–	–	–	–	–	–	1	–	–	2	–	20	9	–	3	–
24	CM	Paul Turnbull	–	–	–	–	–	–	–	–	–	–	1	–	–	–	–	–	1	–	–	–
25	W	Claudio Dias	–	1	–	–	–	–	–	–	–	–	–	–	–	–	–	–	1	–	–	–
27	ST	Ivan Toney	–	–	–	–	1	–	–	–	–	–	–	–	–	–	–	–	1	–	–	–
28	ST	Roy O'Donovan	15	1	5	–	–	–	–	–	–	–	–	–	3	–	1	18	1	6	2	–
29	W	David Moyo	2	3	–	–	1	–	–	–	–	–	–	–	–	–	–	2	4	–	–	–
30	CB	Clarke Carlisle	26	–	3	–	–	–	–	–	–	–	–	–	3	–	–	29	–	3	11	1
Players who left before season end:
1	GK	Shane Higgs	–	–	–	2	–	–	–	–	–	1	–	–	–	–	–	3	–	–	–	–
6	CB	Anthony Charles	8	1	–	1	–	–	–	–	–	1	–	–	–	–	–	10	1	–	2	1
15	W	Henoc Mukendi	–	6	–	1	–	–	–	2	–	2	1	1	–	–	–	3	9	1	1	–
23	RB	Danny East	12	2	–	2	–	–	1	–	–	2	–	–	–	–	–	17	2	–	1	1
23	CM	Emmanuel Oyeleke	1	1	–	–	–	–	–	–	–	–	–	–	–	–	–	1	1	–	–	–
27	W	Kemar Roofe	4	2	–	–	–	–	–	–	–	1	–	–	–	–	–	5	2	–	–	–
28	CM	Emyr Huws	9	1	–	2	–	–	–	–	–	1	–	–	–	–	–	12	1	–	1	–

== Transfers ==
=== Transfers in ===
Date from	Position	Nationality	Name	From	Fee	Ref.
1 July 2012	CF	(England)	Clive Platt	Coventry City	Free transfer	
1 July 2012	CF	(England)	Alex Nicholls	Walsall	Free transfer	
1 July 2012	LM	(England)	Ishmel Demontagnac	Notts County	Free transfer	
3 July 2012	RM	(England)	Chris Hackett	Millwall	Free transfer	
5 July 2012	LB	(England)	Joe Widdowson	Rochdale	Free transfer	
13 August 2012	CB	(England)	David Artell	Port Vale	Free transfer	
17 August 2012	CF	(England)	Louis Moult	Stoke City	Free transfer	
4 January 2013	CB	(England)	Clarke Carlisle	York City	Free transfer	
31 January 2013	CF	(Republic of Ireland)	Roy O'Donovan	Coventry City	Free transfer	
8 February 2013	CB	(England)	Lee Collins	Barnsley	Free transfer	

=== Transfers out ===
Date from	Position	Nationality	Name	To	Fee	Ref.
26 June 2012	LM	(England)	Michael Jacobs	Derby County	Undisclosed	
30 June 2012	CM	(New Zealand)	Michael Built	Unattached	Released	
30 June 2012	CM	(England)	Ryan Gilligan	Östersunds FK	Released	
30 June 2012	RB	(England)	Jason Crowe	Corby Town	Released	
30 June 2012	GK	(Bermuda)	Freddy Hall	Toronto FC	Released	
30 June 2012	LB	(England)	Andy Holt	Corby Town	Released	
30 June 2012	CM	(England)	Nathaniel Wedderburn	Corby Town	Released	
30 June 2012	RM	(England)	Lewis Young	Yeovil Town	Released	
30 June 2012	CF	(Republic of Ireland)	Tadhg Purcell	Unattached	Released	
2 July 2012	GK	(United States)	Neal Kitson	Unattached	Released	
4 July 2012	RM	(Wales)	Arron Davies	Exeter City	Released	
5 July 2012	CB	(England)	Byron Webster	Yeovil Town	Released	
20 November 2012	GK	(England)	Shane Higgs	Unattached	Released	
17 January 2013	CB	(England)	Anthony Charles	Plymouth Argyle	Released	

=== Loans in ===
Start date	Position	Nationality	Name	From	End date	Ref.
6 August 2012	GK	(England)	Lee Nicholls	Wigan Athletic	30 June 2013	
8 August 2012	CF	(Democratic Republic of the Congo)	Henoc Mukendi	Liverpool	1 January 2013	
29 August 2012	RB	(England)	Danny East	Hull City	1 January 2013	
27 September 2012	W	(England)	Kemar Roofe	West Bromwich Albion	27 October 2012	
10 October 2012	CM	(Wales)	Emyr Huws	Manchester City	5 January 2013	
19 November 2012	CB	(England)	Clarke Carlisle	York City	19 January 2013	
22 November 2012	RB	(England)	Chris Smith	Swindon Town	1 January 2013	
28 January 2013	CM	(England)	Emmanuel Oyeleke	Brentford	28 February 2013	
26 March 2013	CB	(England)	Nathan Cameron	Coventry City	30 June 2013	

=== Loans out ===
Start date	Position	Nationality	Name	To	End date	Ref.
8 September 2012	CF	(England)	Jake Robinson	Luton Town	8 October 2012	
21 September 2012	CF	(England)	Paul Turnbull	Stockport County	21 December 2012	
