= 2013 Football League Two play-off final =

English association football match in 2013

- Wembley Stadium
- Event: 2012–13 Football League Two
Bradford City	Northampton Town
3	0
- Date: 18 May 2013
- Venue: Wembley Stadium, London
- Referee: Keith Stroud (Hampshire)
- Attendance: 47,127

The 2013 Football League Two play-off final was an association football match played on 18 May 2013 at Wembley Stadium, London, between Bradford City and Northampton Town. The match determined the fourth and final team to gain promotion from Football League Two, English football's fourth tier, to Football League One. The top three teams of the 2012–13 Football League Two season gained automatic promotion to League One, while the teams placed from fourth to seventh in the table took part in play-off semi-finals; the winners then competed for the final place for the 2013–14 season in League One. Northampton Town finished in sixth place while Bradford City ended the season in seventh position. Burton Albion and Cheltenham Town were the losing semi-finalists, being defeated by Bradford and Northampton respectively.

The match was refereed by Keith Stroud in front of a crowd of 47,127. In the 15th minute of play, Bradford took the lead after James Hanson headed in a pass from Garry Thompson after James Meredith's cross. Four minutes later, the lead was doubled when Rory McArdle's strong header from a Nathan Doyle cross went low into Northampton's goal. Nahki Wells then volleyed past Lee Nicholls from close range just under the half-hour mark in the first half to make it 3–0 to Bradford. Northampton failed to make a shot on target and the match ended 3–0 to see Bradford promoted to League One.

Bradford ended their following season in 11th place in League One, while Northampton finished in 21st place in League Two in their next season, two places and three points above the relegation zone. Their manager, Aidy Boothroyd, was sacked in December 2013 with the club at the bottom of the division.

== Route to the final ==
Football League Two final table, leading positions
Pos	Team	Pld	W	D	L	GF	GA	GD	Pts
1	Gillingham	46	23	14	9	66	39	+27	83
2	Rotherham United	46	24	7	15	74	59	+15	79
3	Port Vale	46	21	15	10	87	52	+35	78
4	Burton Albion	46	22	10	14	71	65	+6	76
5	Cheltenham Town	46	20	15	11	58	51	+7	75
6	Northampton Town	46	21	10	15	64	55	+9	73
7	Bradford City	46	18	15	13	63	52	+11	69

Northampton Town finished the regular 2012–13 season in sixth place in Football League Two, the fourth tier of the English football league system, one place and four points ahead of Bradford City. Both therefore missed out on the three automatic places for promotion to Football League One and instead took part in the play-offs to determine the fourth promoted team. Northampton Town finished five points behind Port Vale (who were promoted in third place), six behind Rotherham United (who were promoted in second place), and ten behind league winners Gillingham.

Bradford City's opponents in their play-off semi-final were Burton Albion with the first match of the two-legged tie taking place at Valley Parade in Bradford on 2 May 2013. Calvin Zola put the visitors ahead midway through the first half with a header, then scored his second in the 29th minute with a curling shot. Damien McCrory was then adjudged to have deflected Garry Thompson's shot with his hand and the referee awarded a penalty to Bradford. Nahki Wells converted the spot kick to make it 2–1 in 38th minute, before Robbie Weir scored from Alex McDonald's pass to make it 3–1 a minute before half-time. With 16 minutes of the game remaining, Thompson scored for Burton making the final score 3–2. The second leg of the semi-final was played three days later at the Pirelli Stadium in Burton upon Trent. Wells opened the scoring for the visitors in the 27th minute when he intercepted Marcus Holness' header and beat Burton goalkeeper Stuart Tomlinson. James Hanson made it 2–0 in the 50th minute with a shot from the edge of the Bradford penalty area, and Jacques Maghoma added a third seven minutes later from the penalty spot after Thompson fouled Stephen Darby in the Burton box. Wells made it 3–1 to Bradford less than two minutes later after Hanson knocked down a long free kick from his goalkeeper Jon McLaughlin. With no further goals, Bradford won the semi-final 5–4 on aggregate and secured their place in the final.

Northampton Town faced Cheltenham Town in the other play-off semi-final with the first leg being played at Sixfields Stadium in Northampton on 2 May 2013. Roy O'Donovan scored in the 27th minute to put Northampton into the lead from a Chris Hackett cross; almost immediately, Paul Benson missed a chance to equalise after shooting wide of the post. Both sides had chances to add to the scoreline but the match finished 1–0. The second leg took place three days later at Whaddon Road in Cheltenham. In the 15th minute, Ben Tozer was deemed to have fouled Russell Penn and the referee awarded a penalty: Marlon Pack took the spot kick but it was saved by Lee Nicholls. Before half-time, Luke Guttridge's volley put Northampton into the lead which they did not relinquish. An aggregate score of 2–0 meant that Northampton progressed to the final.

== Match ==
=== Background ===
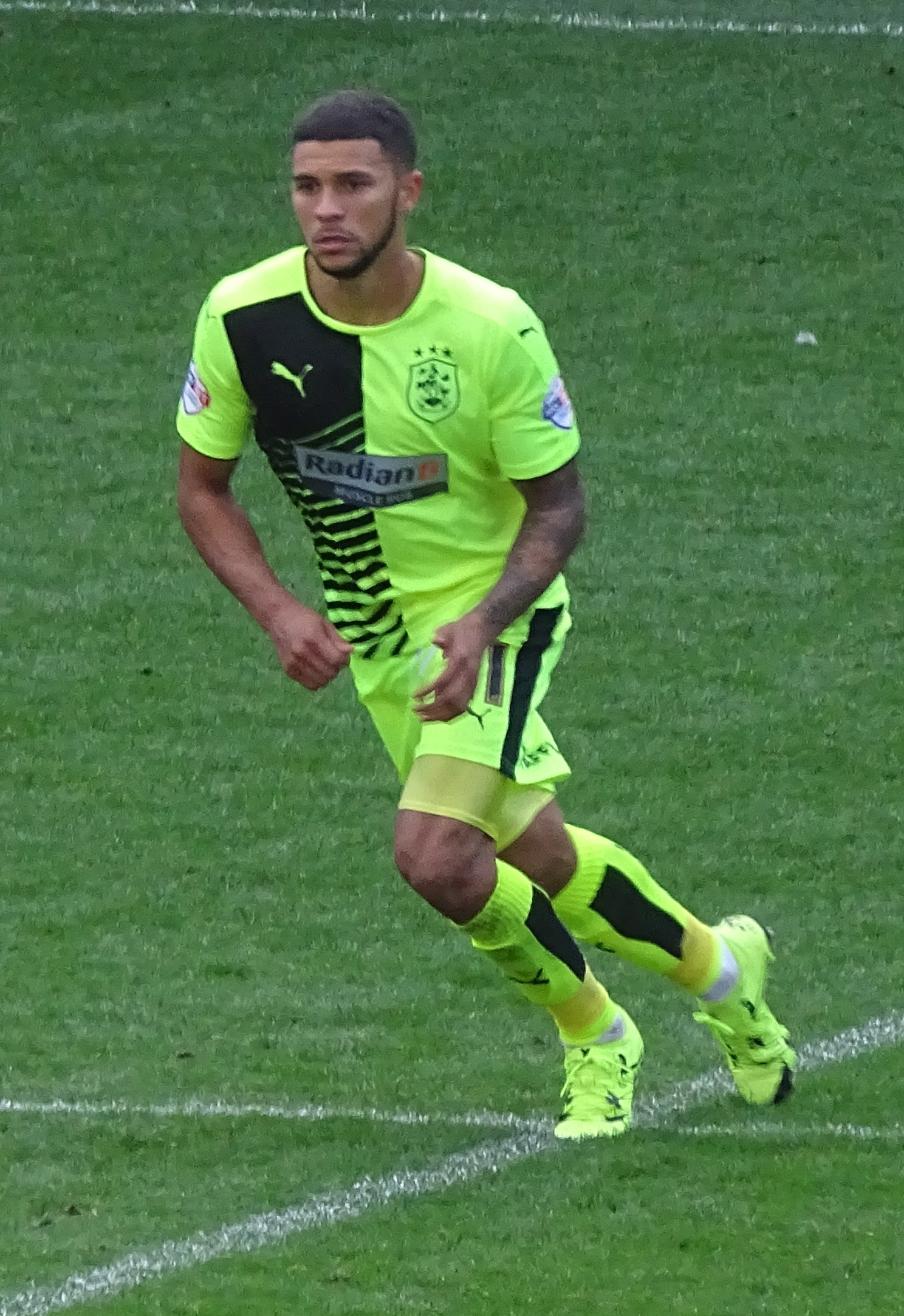
Nahki Wells (pictured in 2015) scored Bradford's third goal of the final.

Bradford had featured in the play-offs on two occasions, losing in the second tier-semi-finals in 1988 and winning the third-tier 1996 Football League Second Division play-off final 2–0 against Notts County. They had played in the fourth tier since relegation from League One in the 2006–07 season. Northampton had lost in the 1998 Football League Second Division play-off final having secured promotion the season before from the fourth tier of English football with victory in the 1997 Football League Third Division play-off final. They had played in the fourth tier since relegation from League One in the 2008–09 season. The teams had faced each other four times during the season. Bradford had won both league matches 1–0, at Sixfields in October 2012 and at Valley Parade in April 2013. They had played one another twice in the first round of the 2012–13 FA Cup. The first encounter, at Sixfields, ended 1–1, forcing a replay which was played ten days later at Valley Parade. That match ended 2–2 in regular time, and 3–3 after extra time; Bradford won 4–2 in the subsequent penalty shootout. The play-off final was Northampton's 64th match of the season. Bradford had already played at Wembley during the season when they faced Swansea City in the League Cup final, losing 5–0.

The referee for the match was Keith Stroud from Hampshire. The assistant referees were Steven Copeland and Jake Hillier. Geoff Eltringham was the fourth official. According to bookmakers, a draw in regular time was the most likely outcome, although Jason Mellor writing in The Times suggested Bradford were marginal favourites having gone unbeaten in the four matches between the sides earlier in the season. Both teams played a 4–4–2 formation. The Northampton supporters were situated in the East End of Wembley while Bradford's fans occupied the West End. The Bradford squad had cost a total of £7,500 with the only transfer fee having been paid for Hanson. The game was broadcast live in the UK on Sky Sports.

=== Summary ===
The match kicked off around 1:30 p.m. on 18 May 2013 in front of a crowd of 47,127. Wells twice went close for Bradford in the early stages of the game, with a free-kick struck over the bar, and later a header. On 15 minutes, Bradford took the lead. A cross from James Meredith found Thompson at the far post who sent the ball back high for Hanson to score with a header. Four minutes later, Rory McArdle doubled the score with a strong header low into the Northampton goal from a Nathan Doyle cross. Clive Platt was then shown the first yellow card of the game in the 21st minute. On 28 minutes, Wells volleyed past Nicholls from close range to make it 3–0 to Bradford. Two minutes later, Roy O'Donovan was booked for a foul on Kyel Reid. Nicholls made a one-handed stop from a Wells shot on 31 minutes.

Neither side made any changes to their personnel during half-time. Immediately after the restart, Nicholls saved an attempt from Hanson. In the 53rd minute, Northampton made their first substitution of the match with Joe Widdowson coming on for Collins. Two minutes later, Northampton's Akinfenwa replaced Platt. In the 67th minute, Clarke Carlisle was booked for a foul on Reid. Northampton made their final substitution of the game in the 70th minute with Lewis Hornby replacing Ishmel Demontagnac. In the 78th minute, Bradford's Will Atkinson replaced Reid. With six minutes of the match remaining, Nathan Doyle was booked for a foul on Widdowson. Connell then came on for Wells in the 85th minute before Ricky Ravenhill replaced Doyle two minutes later. Hanson was then shown a yellow card for a foul on Nathan Cameron. O'Donovan's header for Northampton went wide of the Bradford goal. Northampton failed to register a single shot on target and the match ended 3–0 with Bradford securing promotion to League One.

=== Details ===
18 May 2013
13:30 BST

Bradford City	3–0	Northampton Town
Hanson 15'; McArdle 19'; Wells 28'

Wembley Stadium, London
Attendance: 47,127
Referee: Keith Stroud (Hampshire)

Bradford City	Northampton Town

GK	1	Jon McLaughlin
RB	2	Stephen Darby
CB	23	Rory McArdle
CB	5	Andrew Davies
LB	3	James Meredith
RM	11	Garry Thompson
CM	18	Gary Jones
CM	24	Nathan Doyle	(yellow card) 85'	(substituted off) 87'
LM	7	Kyel Reid		(substituted off) 78'
CF	9	James Hanson	(yellow card) 89'
CF	21	Nahki Wells		(substituted off) 85'
Substitutes:
GK	12	Matt Duke
DF	16	Carl McHugh
DF	22	Michael Nelson
MF	4	Ricky Ravenhill		(substituted on) 87'
MF	14	Will Atkinson		(substituted on) 78'
FW	17	Alan Connell		(substituted on) 85'
FW	20	Zavon Hines
Manager:
Phil Parkinson

GK	21	Lee Nicholls
RB	12	Ben Tozer
CB	30	Clarke Carlisle	(yellow card) 67'
CB	15	Nathan Cameron
LB	6	Lee Collins		(substituted off) 53'
RM	11	Chris Hackett
CM	8	Ben Harding
CM	4	Luke Guttridge
LM	7	Ishmel Demontagnac		(substituted off) 70'
CF	28	Roy O'Donovan	(yellow card) 30'
CF	9	Clive Platt	(yellow card) 21'	(substituted off) 55'
Substitutes:
GK	13	Dean Snedker
DF	2	John Johnson
DF	3	Joe Widdowson		(substituted on) 53'
DF	5	Kelvin Langmead
MF	22	Lewis Hornby		(substituted on) 70'
FW	10	Adebayo Akinfenwa		(substituted on) 55'
FW	17	Jake Robinson
Manager:
Aidy Boothroyd

Referee: Keith Stroud
Assistant Referees: Steven Copeland and Jake Hillier
Fourth Official: Geoff Eltringham
Reserve Assistant Referee: Marc Perry

Statistics
	Bradford City	Northampton Town
Total shots	12	10
Shots on target	8	0
Ball possession	54%	46%
Corner kicks	8	3
Fouls committed	14	16
Yellow cards	2	3
Red cards	0	0

== Post-match ==
Winning manager Phil Parkinson noted: "This determines the future of the club. In the League Cup it was great to reach the final, given the revenue that it brought in, but this is what it's all about. This is our bread and butter – to get this club back to where it belongs." He described the season's achievements as "his best yet as a manager." His counterpart Aidy Boothroyd said: "It's great to have got here but when you get to a final like this, you want to be a winner, nothing else." He added: "[Bradford] dealt with the whole occasion and the game, more importantly, better than we did. This is a rubbish day."

Bradford ended their following season in 11th place in League One, 15 points outside the play-offs and 12 points above the relegation zone. Northampton finished in 21st place in League Two in their next season, two places and three points above the relegation zone. Boothroyd was sacked in December 2013 with the club at the bottom of the division.
