= Lee Collins (footballer, born 1988) =

English footballer (1988–2021)

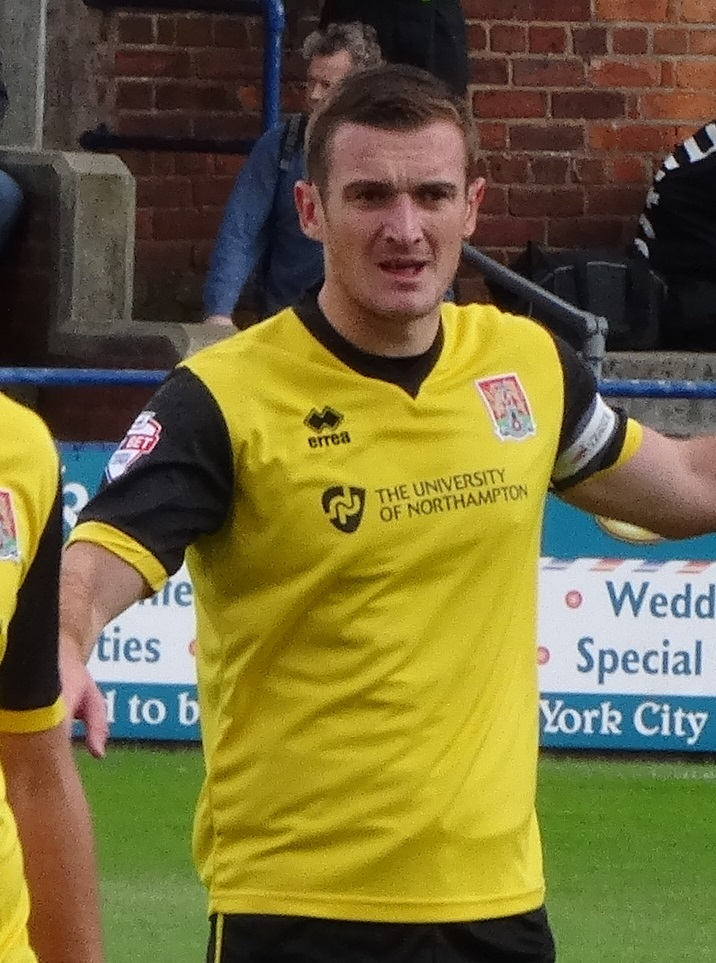
- Collins with Northampton Town in 2014

Personal information
- Full name: Lee Harvey Collins
- Date of birth: 28 September 1988
- Place of birth: Telford, England
- Date of death: 31 March 2021 (aged 32)
- Place of death: West Coker, England
- Height: 5 ft 11 in (1.80 m)
- Position: Defender

Youth career
- 2004–2007: Wolverhampton Wanderers

Senior career*
Years	Team	Apps	(Gls)
2007–2009	Wolverhampton Wanderers	0	(0)
2007–2008	→ Hereford United (loan)	16	(0)
2008	→ Port Vale (loan)	22	(0)
2009–2012	Port Vale	120	(4)
2012	→ Barnsley (loan)	7	(0)
2012–2013	Barnsley	0	(0)
2012	→ Shrewsbury Town (loan)	8	(0)
2013–2015	Northampton Town	75	(1)
2015–2017	Mansfield Town	72	(0)
2017–2019	Forest Green Rovers	54	(3)
2019–2021	Yeovil Town	34	(0)
Total		408	(8)
- * Club domestic league appearances and goals

Lee Harvey Collins (28 September 1988 – 31 March 2021) was an English professional footballer who played as a defender. He was more comfortable as a centre-back, but could also play as a full-back. He scored eight goals in 471 league and cup appearances throughout a 14-year professional career in the English Football League and National League.

He graduated from the Wolverhampton Wanderers Academy to become a professional in February 2007. He spent much of the 2007–08 season on loan at Hereford United, helping the club to win promotion into League One. He joined Port Vale on loan at the start of the 2008–09 season, and his loan stay was made permanent in January 2009. He played 53 games for the club in 2009–10 and continued to be a key member of the defence in 2010–11. He joined Championship club Barnsley on loan in March 2012, with a view to a permanent deal in the summer. From Barnsley, he was loaned out to Shrewsbury Town in September 2012.

He moved back into League Two with Northampton Town in February 2013 and spent over two years with the club before moving on to Mansfield Town; he captained both Northampton and Mansfield. He signed with Forest Green Rovers in May 2017 and stayed with the club for two seasons before joining non-League Yeovil Town in June 2019. He served Yeovil as club captain until his death, at 32, in March 2021.

== Club career ==
=== Wolverhampton Wanderers ===
Born in Telford, Shropshire, Collins was promoted to Wolverhampton Wanderers' first-team squad for the first time in January 2007, signing his first professional forms the next month. Though regularly on the bench, he never made a first-team appearance. However, he played regularly for the club at reserve level and with the under-18s, for whom he was captain.

He joined Hereford United on 14 November 2007 on an initial month's loan, and made his league debut on 17 November 2007 in a 3–2 win at Stockport County. After impressing, his loan was extended to the end of the season, during which Hereford won promotion to League One.

=== Port Vale ===
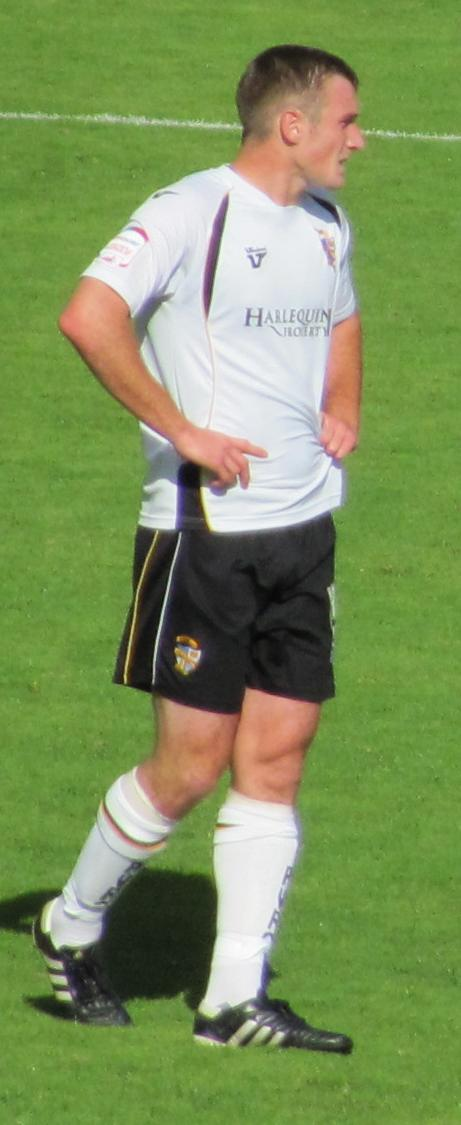
Collins at Vale Park in a 1–0 September 2010 victory over Aldershot Town

Collins went on loan to League Two side Port Vale at the start of the 2008–09 season, and became a first-team regular. Vale then signed him on a 2 1/2-year deal on 16 January 2009 after Wolves agreed to release him from the rest of his deal at Molineux. He gained his first senior goal in a 1–1 home draw with Wycombe Wanderers on 25 April 2009. With 42 appearances to his name in his first season with the club, he was described as the most consistent performer of the season.

He remained in the first team for the start of the 2009–10 campaign. He was transfer listed in late September, along with the entire Port Vale squad, after manager Micky Adams saw his team slip to a third consecutive defeat. Despite this he remained a key member of the defence, alongside Gareth Owen and John McCombe. Playing regular football helped Collins realise that he needed to 'bulk out' to become a more physically dominant player. His solid performances attracted attention, as well as March 2010 rumours of a £200,000 move to Watford. Rumours that Collins rubbished as "paper talk". A candidate for Player of the Year, he instead picked up Chairman's Player of the Year and Players' Player of the Year awards, as well as the award for best assist "following his storming run from inside his own half to set up Marc Richards against Hereford at Vale Park". Collins was keen to extend his contract beyond its conclusion in the summer of 2011.

He got the perfect start to the 2010–11 season by blasting in the only goal of the opening game of the season at Bury. Anticipating interest from other clubs, in September Adams began negotiations to extend his contract by a further season. Upon signing the deal Collins praised current and former training staff at the club, naming Dean Glover, Lee Sinnott, Mark Grew, Geoff Horsfield, and Micky Adams as people who helped his progress 'massively'. His consistency over his 48 appearances helped Vale to boast one of the strongest defensive records in the division that season.

He missed a few weeks at the start of the 2011–12 season after undergoing a small operation to repair a hernia-related problem. He was then sidelined for a further five weeks after he had to undergo surgery on an unrelated groin injury. Vale conceded 18 goals in the twelve games that Collins missed, before keeping a clean sheet on his return to the first-team on 12 November, a goalless draw with Grimsby Town in the FA Cup. He again was sidelined in January, as he picked up an ankle injury. In total, he made 162 appearances for Vale, scoring four goals. Collins was named as Port Vale's best left-back of the 2010s in a public poll taken in January 2020 by The Sentinel; he received 50% of the vote, ahead of Carl Dickinson (40%).

=== Barnsley ===
On 15 March 2012, Collins joined Barnsley on loan for the remainder of the season, with the move becoming permanent at the end of the season. Port Vale received £50,000 for the loan deal. He arrived at Oakwell amid an injury crisis in the Barnsley defence. He impressed manager Keith Hill in his seven appearances in 2011–12, particularly in the game against Blackpool.

Despite injuries to other "Tykes" defenders, he did not feature in the first team at the start of the 2012–13 season. On 28 September 2012, Collins joined League One side Shrewsbury Town on a month-long loan deal. "Shrews" boss Graham Turner, his former manager at Hereford, said that he would provide valuable defensive experience and cover following an injury to Joe Jacobson. Collins made eight appearances before he had his loan deal extended by one month. On 29 November, his loan was cut short, and he returned to his parent club. Having never taken to the field for Barnsley in the 2012–13 season, he was released from his contract on 31 January 2013 by manager David Flitcroft.

=== Northampton Town ===
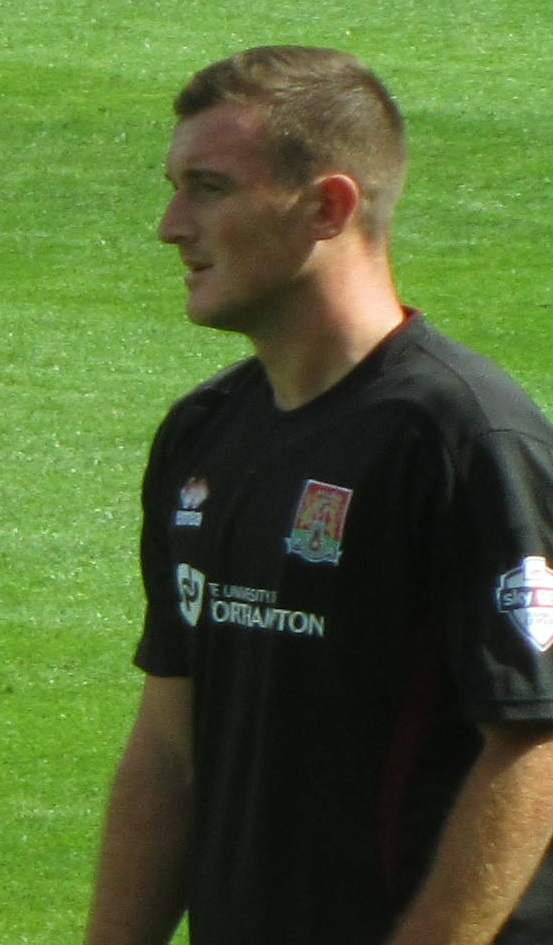
Collins playing for Northampton Town in 2013

He joined Northampton Town until the end of the 2012–13 season in February 2013. Manager Aidy Boothroyd signed him to provide competition in the "Cobblers" defence, particularly to left-back Joe Widdowson. On 20 April, he scored an own goal at Vale Park which effectively promoted his former club, Port Vale, back into League One. He was allowed to participate in the play-offs, despite being subject to a curfew order. He played 55 minutes of the play-off final defeat to Bradford City. He signed a new two-year contract in May 2013.

He played 25 games during the 2013–14 campaign as Northampton avoided relegation out of the English Football League by a three-point margin. However, he played only twice under new manager Chris Wilder after being ruled out for the rest of the season with a foot tendon injury in February. During the season, he was appointed club captain. He made 43 appearances in the 2014–15 campaign but was not offered a new contract in the summer as Wilder opted to use Zander Diamond and Ryan Cresswell as his new centre-back partnership.

=== Mansfield Town ===
Collins joined League Two club Mansfield Town in June 2015, with "Stags" manager Adam Murray praising his ability and experience, saying that "to bring Lee in to the building is a big one for us". He made 38 appearances across the 2015–16 campaign after recovering from a foot injury picked up in pre-season. He was appointed club captain in January and went on to sign a new contract in the summer. He was released by Mansfield at the end of the 2016–17 season, having made 44 appearances to help Mansfield to a 12th-place finish.

=== Forest Green Rovers ===
In May 2017, Collins joined Forest Green Rovers on a two-year contract to become the club's first signing following their promotion from the National League into the English Football League. He scored two goals in 48 appearances over the 2017–18 campaign to help the Green to a 21st-place finish. He missed much of the 2018–19 season with a long-term injury but returned to fitness in time to feature in both legs of the play-off semi-final defeat to Tranmere Rovers. He was released by Forest Green Rovers at the end of the 2018–19 season.

=== Yeovil Town ===
"He wore his heart on his sleeve on the pitch and was known for his leadership, he was the epitome of a captain, he did everything he could in that 90 minutes to win the three points."

— BBC Radio Somerset's Yeovil Town commentator Sheridan Robins.

On 26 June 2019, Collins signed a two-year contract with newly relegated National League side Yeovil Town; manager Darren Sarll said that "Lee is a winner and his experience and leadership will make him a big part of this squad". He made 31 appearances for the "Glovers" in the 2019–20 season, which was permanently suspended on 26 March due to the COVID-19 pandemic in England, with Yeovil in fourth-place. Yeovil entered the play-offs at the quarter-final stage, where they were beaten 2–0 by Barnet. His last appearance for Yeovil was on 6 February 2021 against Stockport County where he was shown a straight red card for a late tackle, although he was an unused substitute in a match a week before his death.

== International career ==
Collins was called up to the England under-19s but did not earn a cap. Despite this, he did not rule out one day playing for the Republic of Ireland, which he qualified for through his Irish father.

== Style of play ==
Collins could play anywhere in defence, though preferred to play at centre-back. Port Vale manager Micky Adams claimed that Collins always gave his all in training, and was a "remarkable athlete... [in] terms of fitness." In February 2010, teammate Marc Richards said that "he reads the game well, he's fast, he's strong...[and has] strength and pace, and he's got vision as well."

== Personal life ==
Collins attended Thomas Telford School as a youth alongside fellow professionals such as Elliott Bennett and Danny Guthrie. Also attending the school was future Port Vale teammate Sam Morsy. Collins and his partner had three daughters, born in 2010, 2016 and 2017.

Collins was convicted of assault in April 2013 after punching and kicking a man at a pub in Wellington, Shropshire the previous year. He was given a one-year prison sentence suspended for two years, 150 hours of unpaid work, 12 weeks of curfew and a fine of £2,500.

== Death ==
On 31 March 2021, Collins was found dead in his room in the Lanes Hotel at West Coker at the age of 32 in an apparent suicide by hanging. His death was announced on the Yeovil website the following day. Yeovil's next scheduled game, against Altrincham on 2 April, was postponed as a mark of respect. Two further games, against Aldershot Town on 10 April and Maidenhead United on 13 April, were also postponed. Port Vale supporters raised £2,450 for the family of Collins.

In April 2021, an inquest into Collins' death was opened and adjourned to July 2021. At the inquest, the coroner recorded a verdict of suicide. It was heard during the inquest that Collins had been drinking heavily every day for the past decade, and had been under the influence of alcohol and cocaine at the time of his suicide. He had also been dealing with gambling addiction, injuries, and a breakup with his partner.

== Career statistics ==
Appearances and goals by club, season and competition
Club	Season	League			FA Cup		League Cup		Other		Total	
Club	Season	Division	Apps	Goals	Apps	Goals	Apps	Goals	Apps	Goals	Apps	Goals
Wolverhampton Wanderers	2007–08	Championship	0	0	0	0	0	0	—		0	0
Wolverhampton Wanderers	2008–09	Championship	0	0	0	0	0	0	—		0	0
Wolverhampton Wanderers	Total		0	0	0	0	0	0	0	0	0	0
Hereford United (loan)	2007–08	League Two	16	0	4	0	—		0	0	20	0
Port Vale	2008–09	League Two	39	1	2	0	1	0	0	0	42	1
Port Vale	2009–10	League Two	45	1	3	0	3	0	2 (Note: Appearance(s) in the Football League Trophy / EFL Trophy.)	0	53	1
Port Vale	2010–11	League Two	42	2	2	0	2	0	2	0	48	2
Port Vale	2011–12	League Two	16	0	2	0	1	0	1	0	20	0
Port Vale	Total		142	4	9	0	7	0	5	0	163	4
Barnsley	2011–12	Championship	7	0	—		—		—		7	0
Barnsley	2012–13	Championship	0	0	0	0	0	0	—		0	0
Barnsley	Total		7	0	0	0	0	0	0	0	7	0
Shrewsbury Town (loan)	2012–13	League One	8	0	1	0	—		1	0	10	0
Northampton Town	2012–13	League Two	15	0	—		—		3 (Note: Appearance(s) in the play-offs.)	0	18	0
Northampton Town	2013–14	League Two	22	1	1	0	1	0	1	0	25	1
Northampton Town	2014–15	League Two	38	0	1	0	2	0	2	0	43	0
Northampton Town	Total		75	1	2	0	3	0	6	0	86	1
Mansfield Town	2015–16	League Two	35	0	2	0	0	0	1	0	38	0
Mansfield Town	2016–17	League Two	37	0	1	0	1	0	5	0	44	0
Mansfield Town	Total		72	0	3	0	1	0	6	0	82	0
Forest Green Rovers	2017–18	League Two	43	2	3	0	1	0	1	0	48	2
Forest Green Rovers	2018–19	League Two	11	1	0	0	1	0	4 (Note: 2 appearances in the EFL Trophy and 2 appearances in the play-offs.)	0	16	1
Forest Green Rovers	Total		54	3	3	0	2	0	5	0	64	3
Yeovil Town	2019–20	National League	27	0	2	0	—		3 (Note: Two appearances in FA Trophy, one appearance in National League play-offs)	0	32	0
Yeovil Town	2020–21	National League	7	0	0	0	—		0	0	7	0
Yeovil Town	Total		34	0	2	0	—		3	0	39	0
Career total			408	8	24	0	13	0	26	0	471	8

== Honours ==
Hereford United

- League Two third-place promotion: 2007–08
