= Daniel Morgan (disambiguation) =

Daniel Morgan (1736–1802) was a Continental Army general and U.S. Representative from Virginia.

Daniel Morgan (or Dan or Danny) may also refer to:

== Government ==
- Daniel N. Morgan (1844–1931), American banker, Treasurer of the United States
- Daniel E. Morgan (1877–1949), American politician, mayor of Cleveland, Ohio
- Danny Morgan (politician) (born 1972), American politician, Oklahoma state representative

== Sports ==
- Danny Morgan (boxer) (born 1961), American middleweight boxer
- Dan Morgan (offensive lineman) (born 1964), American football offensive lineman
- Daniel Morgan (cricketer) (born 1974), Bermudian cricketer
- Danny Morgan (Australian footballer) (born 1974), Australian rules footballer
- Dan Morgan (born 1978), American football linebacker and executive
- Danny Morgan (footballer, born 1984), English footballer
- Dan Morgan (footballer) (born 1990), New Zealand footballer
- Danny Morgan (cyclist), Welsh cyclist

== Other people ==
- Daniel Morgan (bushranger) (1830–1865), Australian bushranger
- Dan Morgan (writer) (1925–2011), English science fiction writer
- Daniel John Morgan (1949–1987), English private investigator murdered in 1987, see murder of Daniel Morgan
- Daniel Morgan (General Hospital), fictional character on the American soap opera General Hospital

== Other uses ==
- Dan Morgan (film), 1911 Australian film about the bushranger
