= Ben Tozer =

English footballer (born 1990)

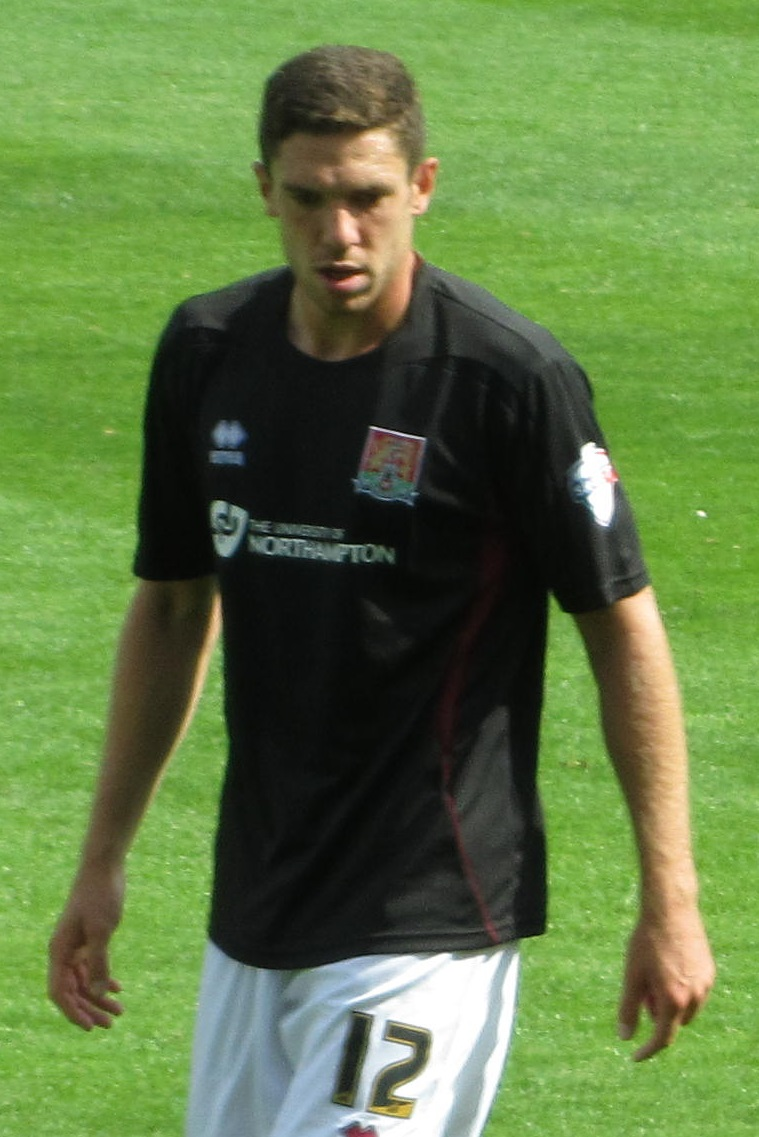
- Tozer playing for Northampton Town in 2013

Personal information
- Full name: Ben Peter Anthony Tozer
- Date of birth: 1 March 1990 (age 36)
- Place of birth: Plymouth, England
- Height: 6 ft 3 in (1.91 m)
- Position: Central defender

Youth career
- 2005–2007: Plymouth Argyle

Senior career*
Years	Team	Apps	(Gls)
2007–2008	Swindon Town	2	(0)
2008–2011	Newcastle United	1	(0)
2010	→ Northampton Town (loan)	5	(1)
2010–2011	→ Northampton Town (loan)	26	(2)
2011–2015	Northampton Town	142	(3)
2013	→ Colchester United (loan)	1	(0)
2015–2016	Yeovil Town	26	(0)
2016–2018	Newport County	62	(4)
2018–2021	Cheltenham Town	119	(6)
2021–2024	Wrexham	118	(6)
2024–2025	Forest Green Rovers	29	(0)
Total		531	(22)
- * Club domestic league appearances and goals as of 14:27, 26 May 2025 (UTC)

Ben Peter Anthony Tozer (born 1 March 1990) is an English former professional footballer who played as a central defender.

== Career ==
=== Swindon Town ===
Born in Plymouth, Tozer began his career as a youth player at his local club Plymouth Argyle, where he studied for a BTEC National Diploma in Sport at City College Plymouth and was part of the college's Football Development Centre. Former Argyle youth coach David Byrne, who by this point had taken up a similar role at Swindon Town persuaded the Tozer family to allow Ben to join him in Wiltshire alongside fellow Argyle youngster Ben Joyce.

On 14 August 2007, Tozer made a surprise full debut for Swindon as a makeshift left-back in the League Cup match with Charlton Athletic.

In November 2007 Tozer started a 4-day trial with Everton, returning in time for Swindon's FA Cup game with Forest Green. This led the club's confirmed speculation that the club was keen to sign Tozer.

=== Newcastle United ===
Tozer moved to Newcastle United on 7 January 2008, penning a four-and-a-half-year deal with the club.

On 11 May, against Everton, Tozer was named on the substitutes bench, but did not play. On 22 September 2009, Tozer made his Newcastle debut starting at centre back alongside Steven Taylor against Peterborough United in the Football League Cup. Newcastle, fielding a side full of youngsters, lost the game 2–0. Tozer went on to make his league debut in a 2–1 home win against Doncaster Rovers, coming on as an 87th-minute substitute for Jonás Gutiérrez.

=== Northampton Town ===
On 21 September 2010, Tozer signed on loan at Northampton Town on a one-month loan.

Tozer made his debut the following day in the Cobblers' third round League Cup win over Liverpool, and the following Saturday scored on his Northampton League debut in the 2–0 win over Bradford City. He was sent off in the game at home to Hereford United for violent conduct, which resulted in the Cobblers delaying renewing his loan until after he served his three-game ban. Tozer had his loan extended twice: the first extension came until 9 January 2011 and the second extension came until the end of the season. He went to make 31 appearances and scoring twice this season against Aldershot Town on 19 February 2011 and Morecambe on 7 May 2011.

Tozer signed a permanent deal with Northampton Town on 23 June 2011, following his release by Newcastle United. He made his Northampton Town debut, in the opening game of the season, a 0–0 draw against Accrington Stanley. Weeks later, Tozer scored his first Northampton Town goal since making his move permanent, in the first round of League Cup, in a 2–1 win over Ipswich Town. In his first full season at Northampton Town, Tozer was almost ever present player with 45 appearances and scoring three times against Barnet on 1 October 2011, Shrewsbury Town on 19 November 2011 and Cheltenham Town on 3 March 2012.

The 2012–13 season saw Tozer start the season well after results went well for the first three matches. He provided double assist, losing 3–2 against Plymouth Argyle on 1 September 2012. Following his grandfather's death, Tozer was given a compassionate leave by Aidy Boothroyd. However, he played a match in a 0–0 draw against Chesterfield. Tozer then provided another double assist in another match, winning 3–0 win against Morecambe on 20 November 2012. In March, he was awarded Northampton Player of the Month for February. Tozer went on to make 46 appearances for the club, making him ever present player throughout the season. He played all three matches in the play-offs and started as a right-back in the play-off final, in a 3–0 defeat to Bradford City. Despite unsuccessful attempt to get promoted to League One, Tozer was offered a new contract and signed a two-year contract on 19 June 2013.

The 2013–14 season saw Tozer featured regularly in the first team for the first five matches at the start of the season. He soon had his playing time reduced following the arrivals of Kevin Amankwaah. With eleven appearances made, Tozer joined League One club Colchester United on an initial one-month loan on 28 November 2013 until 4 January 2014 to provide defensive cover over the Christmas period. He made his debut for the club on 14 December in a 4–0 home defeat to Notts County. He was replaced on 67 minutes by Tosin Olufemi while the score was 2–0. After making one appearance for Colchester United, Tozer was recalled by the club on 23 December 2013. Following his return to Northampton Town, Tozer made a return to the first team, which saw him awarded Northampton Player of the Month for January. Despite being on the substitute bench for nine matches towards the end of the season, Tozer would make 29 appearances for the club. He soon expressed his future in doubt following the arrival of Manager Chris Wilder, who arrived during the season.

The 2014–15 season saw Tozer's playing time increase at the start of the season as a right-back despite being on the bench. The following arrival of Brendan Moloney saw his playing time reduced to the bench. Soon after, Tozer suffered a knee injury during training that ruled him out for a month. Two months later, he made his return to training. He made his first appearance back from injury, coming on as a substitute for Evan Horwood in the 50th minute, in a 2–1 loss against Stevenage on 11 April 2015. At the end of the season, Tozer went to make 22 appearances for the club. After five years at the club, he was among seven players to be released by the club.

=== Yeovil Town ===
On 19 June 2015, Tozer signed for League Two side Yeovil Town on a one-year deal. Upon signing for the club, he was given a number two shirt ahead of a new season.

However, Tozer's start to his Yeovil Town suffered a setback when he had a cartilage problem and was expected to be sidelined until September. It wasn't until November when he made his return from training and made his Yeovil Town debut in the first round of FA Cup, in a 1–0 win over Maidstone United. Six days later, on 14 November 2015, Tozer made his league debut on 14 November 2015, in a 2–2 draw against Stevenage. A month later on 5 December 2015, he scored his first Yeovil Town goal in the fourth round of the FA Cup, in a 1–0 win over Stevenage, the team he made his debut against. Since making his Yeovil Town, Tozer became a first team regular at the club, where he "made the anchorman role in Way's three-man central midfield his own" and finished the 2015–16 season, making 32 appearances and scoring once in all competition.

At the end of the 2015–16 season, Tozer was offered a new contract by the club. On 10 June 2016, a local newspaper based in Yeovil Town reported that he had agreed to sign a new contract with the club. As weeks went by, it was increasingly likely that Tozer would sign a new contract with the club despite continuing to recover from his knee, having become a concern to the club's management.

=== Newport County ===
On 4 July 2016, Tozer rejected Yeovil's offer of a new contract, and signed for fellow League Two side Newport County on a one-year deal. Upon joining the club, Tozer was given the number 12 shirt for a new season.

Tozer made his debut for Newport on 6 August 2016 in the opening game of the season, in a 3–2 loss against Mansfield Town as a second-half substitute. In a match against Doncaster Rovers on 17 September 2016, Tozer made his first start and played the whole game, in a 2–0 loss. He scored his first goal for Newport on 25 October 2016 in the League Two match versus Barnet which ended in a 2–2 draw. He was regularly selected in the first half of the season but then fell out with manager Graham Westley and he was not selected after 7 January 2017 for the rest of the 2016–17 season. By the end of the 2016–17 season Mike Flynn had taken over as Newport County manager and Tozer's contract was extended for a further year.

=== Cheltenham Town ===
On 24 May 2018, it was announced that Tozer had declined a contract extension at Newport and signed for Cheltenham Town after his Newport contract had expired. He made his Cheltenham debut on 4 August 2018 in an opening day League Two home defeat to Crawley Town. He scored his first goal for the club in a 2–2 draw with Mansfield Town in November 2018. In October 2019, he signed a new contract at the club that would keep him there until the summer of 2022.

At the end of the 2019–20 season he helped Cheltenham to the League Two play-off semi-finals, only to be defeated 3–2 on aggregate by his former club Northampton Town. The following season, Tozer led Cheltenham to the league title, winning the Supporters' Player of the Year and Players' Player of the Year awards in the process.

=== Wrexham ===
Tozer joined National League promotion favourites Wrexham on 27 August 2021. He signed a three-year deal for an undisclosed fee. In the 2022–23 season, Tozer earned a place in the National League Team of the Year. On 3 May 2024, it was announced that Tozer would not be offered a new contract and would be released by Wrexham.

=== Forest Green Rovers ===
On 3 June 2024, it was announced that Tozer would join newly-relegated to National League side Forest Green Rovers following the expiry of his Wrexham contract.

On 26 May 2025, Tozer announced his retirement from professional football. He made a statement on Ben Foster's debate content The Football Fill-In.

== Style of play ==
Known for his exceptionally long throw-ins, Tozer's sideline launches have been termed the "long-throw weapon" of the teams that he's played with; he professed to studying Rory Delap's technique. His throw-in for Wrexham in their 3–0 home win over York City on 25 March 2023, led to the Dragons' second goal from Sam Dalby, scoring off a header thrown in directly from Tozer.

== Personal life ==
Tozer grew up in Plymouth, England and has a brother, Lee, who used to be a postman.

In January 2021, Tozer spoke about his previous struggles with anxiety, which led him to nearly quitting the game.

As of January 2021, Tozer was married with two children.

Tozer's father Keith Tozer died from leukemia in 2023, two days after being hospitalised.

== Career statistics ==
As of match played 26 December 2024

Appearances and goals by club, season and competition
Club	Season	League			FA Cup		League Cup		Other		Total	
Club	Season	Division	Apps	Goals	Apps	Goals	Apps	Goals	Apps	Goals	Apps	Goals
Swindon Town	2007–08	League One	2	0	2	0	1	0	2 (Note: Appearance(s) in the Football League Trophy)	0	7	0
Newcastle United	2007–08	Premier League	0	0	—		—		—		0	0
Newcastle United	2008–09	Premier League	0	0	0	0	0	0	—		0	0
Newcastle United	2009–10	Championship	1	0	0	0	1	0	—		2	0
Newcastle United	2010–11	Premier League	0	0	0	0	0	0	—		0	0
Newcastle United	Total		1	0	0	0	1	0	—		2	0
Northampton Town (loan)	2010–11	League Two	31	3	2	0	1	0	0	0	34	3
Northampton Town	2011–12	League Two	45	3	1	0	2	1	1	0	49	4
Northampton Town	2012–13	League Two	46	0	2	0	2	0	6 (Note: Three appearances in the Football League Trophy, three in the League Two play-offs)	0	56	0
Northampton Town	2013–14	League Two	29	0	1	0	1	0	1	0	32	0
Northampton Town	2014–15	League Two	22	0	2	0	2	0	2	0	28	0
Northampton Town	Total		173	6	8	0	8	1	10	0	199	7
Colchester United (loan)	2010–11	League One	1	0	—		—		—		1	0
Yeovil Town	2015–16	League Two	26	0	4	1	0	0	2	0	32	1
Newport County	2016–17	League Two	23	1	4	0	1	0	3 (Note: Appearance(s) in EFL Trophy)	0	31	1
Newport County	2017–18	League Two	39	3	4	0	1	0	1	0	45	3
Newport County	Total		62	4	8	0	2	0	4	0	76	4
Cheltenham Town	2018–19	League Two	37	1	3	0	2	0	4	0	46	1
Cheltenham Town	2019–20	League Two	34	3	3	0	1	0	4 (Note: Two appearances and one goal in EFL Trophy, two appearances in EFL League Two play-offs)	1	42	4
Cheltenham Town	2020–21	League Two	46	2	4	0	2	0	3	0	55	2
Cheltenham Town	2021–22	League One	2	0	0	0	2	0	0	0	4	0
Cheltenham Town	Total		119	6	10	0	7	0	11	1	147	7
Wrexham	2021–22	National League	43	1	3	0	—		7 (Note: Six appearances in FA Trophy, one appearance and one goal in National League play-offs)	1	53	2
Wrexham	2022–23	National League	46	4	7	0	—		0	0	53	4
Wrexham	2023–24	League Two	29	1	4	0	2	0	0	0	35	1
Wrexham	Total		118	6	14	0	2	0	7	1	141	7
Forest Green Rovers	2024–25	National League	29	0	2	0	—		5 (Note: Three appearances in National League Cup], two appearances in FA Trophy)	0	36	0
Career total			531	22	48	1	21	1	41	2	641	26

== Honours ==
Cheltenham Town

- EFL League Two: 2020–21

Wrexham

- National League: 2022–23
- EFL League Two second-place promotion: 2023–24
- FA Trophy runner-up: 2021–22

Individual

- PFA Team of the Year: 2019–20 League Two, 2020–21 League Two
- Cheltenham Town Players' Player of the Year: 2020–21
- Cheltenham Town's Bryan Jacob Cup Supporters' Player of the Year: 2020–21
- National League Team of the Year: 2022–23
