= Chris Hackett (footballer) =

English footballer

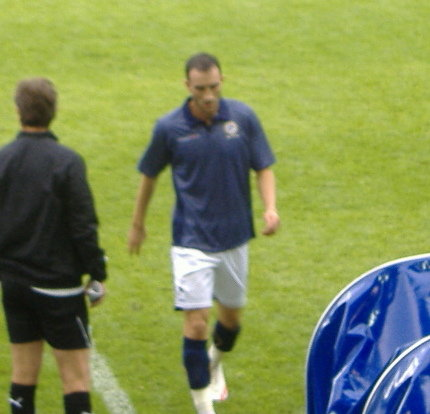
- Hackett playing for Millwall in 2010

Personal information
- Full name: Christopher James Hackett
- Date of birth: 1 March 1983 (age 43)
- Place of birth: Oxford, England
- Height: 6 ft 0 in (1.83 m)
- Position: Winger

Youth career
- –2000: Oxford United

Senior career*
Years	Team	Apps	(Gls)
2000–2006	Oxford United	142	(9)
2006	Heart of Midlothian	2	(0)
2006–2012	Millwall	145	(6)
2011–2012	→ Exeter City (loan)	5	(0)
2012	→ Wycombe Wanderers (loan)	8	(0)
2012–2016	Northampton Town	138	(12)
2016	→ Barnet (loan)	5	(0)
Total		445	(27)
- * Club domestic league appearances and goals

Christopher James Hackett (born 1 March 1983) is an English retired footballer who works as assistant manager at Oxford United.

== Club career ==
=== Oxford United ===
Born in Oxford, Oxfordshire, on 1 March 1983, Hackett started his career with home-town club Oxford United, where he progressed through the club's youth system and reserve side. His appearances for Oxford United's SE Counties League youth team earned Hackett a place among the club's first-year trainees, beginning in July 1999. His performances for the youth team led to a first-team call up by manager Denis Smith. Hackett made his debut as a 77th-minute substitute in a 2–0 loss against Wigan Athletic on 8 April 2000. He made a further substitute appearance in the last match of the season.

In 2000–01, Hackett featured more frequently in the first team and received more playing time. On 16 December 2000, he scored his first goal for the club, in a 3–1 win over Northampton Town. After the match, his performance was praised by manager Dave Kemp, who said: "Chris was a breath of fresh air on the wing. He's a bright talent for this club. It was a great individual goal but a great team goal as well, because there had been some good passing before that. I'm delighted with the performance." Shortly afterwards, Hackett was offered a five-year contract. His performances attracted interest from larger clubs such as Coventry City, Manchester United, Newcastle United and Middlesbrough. Hackett's second goal came on 10 February 2001, in a 2–1 defeat to Wycombe Wanderers. In his following match, he was sent off after elbowing Chris Armstrong, in a 3–1 loss to Bury. He later played in different positions before being sidelined with a hernia injury that kept him out for the rest of the season. By the end of the 2000–01 season, Hackett had made eighteen appearances and scored twice in all competitions.

Hackett returned from injury and featured in the reserve side at the start of the following season. His first appearance in the first team was on 16 October 2001 when he came on as a second-half substitute in a 2–0 defeat to Northampton Town. Hackett was returned to the reserve side but soon regained his first-team place. He earned praise from manager Ian Atkins, who said: "The only one that you can say has really been listening over the last few weeks is Chrissy Hackett. He came on Tuesday night and put some good crosses into the six-yard box. Other players had chances to get the ball into areas where it can hurt defenders, but didn't do it." However, halfway through the season Hackett and team-mate Dean Whitehead were criticised by Atkins for refusing to follow a fitness programme, an accusation denied by the pair, who claimed a misunderstanding. Hackett made seventeen first-team appearances during the season.

In 2002–03, Hackett was given the number 7 shirt following the departure of Martin Thomas. In a match against Swansea City on 12 October 2002, Hackett came on as a substitute in the 68th minute and set up the winner and the only goal of the game, for Jefferson Louis. After the match, he said of his restricted appearances from the substitute bench: "I've never had a problem with it. I've had to wait my chance, but the gaffer and Fordy have said it would come. It's a squad game and we've got a really good squad at Oxford." In a 2–2 draw against Shrewsbury Town on 26 October 2002, Hackett was sent off for a second bookable offence in the last minute of the game. Following his suspension, he returned to the reserve side for most of the season. making just 14 first-team appearances in all competitions in 2002–03.

Hackett began 2003–04 on the substitutes' bench and playing for the reserves, but he had regained his first-team place by the start of October. On 21 October 2003, Hackett scored in a 2–2 draw against York. After the match, he was praised by the club's assistant David Oldfield, who said: "Chris Hackett has come on in recent games and caused problems for teams. He came on with a good attitude and in recent weeks has looked very sharp in training, with some great finishing and crossing. He deserved a goal." By December, his playing time was reduced, due to competition from Emmanuel Omoyinmi and Jefferson Louis, and he spent months in the club's reserve side once again. He regained his first-team place at the start of March, but suffered and injury towards the end of the season. His goal against York proved to be his only goal in 25 appearances in all competitions in 2003–04.

Hackett signed a new two-year contract with Oxford on 18 June 2004. He started the season well, setting up a goal for Tommy Mooney, who was to be the club's top scorer later in the 2004–05, in a 1–0 win over Mansfield Town on 11 August 2004. However, Hackett sustained suspected medial ligament damage during a 0–0 draw against Leyton Orient on 21 August 2004, and did not return until 25 September 2005 when he came on as a substitute in the second half and set up two goals in a 3–1 win over Bury. Hackett soon regained his first-team place for the side, setting up both goals against Cambridge United in a 2–1 win in Ramón Díaz's first match in charge on 11 December 2004. On Boxing Day 2004 he scored his first goal of the season, against Rushden & Diamonds, in a 3–3 draw. In a 2–1 win over Wycombe Wanderers on 1 January 2005, he was sent off in the 34th minute "for kicking out at Tony Craig on the ground" and served a three-match ban as a result. He scored on his return from suspension on 22 January 2005, in a 3–1 win over Kidderminster Harriers. He scored twice in a 3–1 win over Mansfield Town. after which his performance was praised by Horacio Rodriguez, who said: "We decided to play Chris up front on Friday, and it worked very well as he scored twice." Hackett was said to be "enjoying the best form of his career", due to his "pacy bursts down the right, and much-improved crossing and dead-ball deliveries." Hackett appeared 39 times in the 2004–05 season, scoring four times, all in the league.

Ahead of the 2005–06 season, Hackett was linked with a surprise move to French giant Olympique de Marseille, but it went no further than a trial. He started the season well, setting up the equalising goal for Chris Hargreaves in a 1–1 draw against Grimsby Town in the opening game of the season. A week later on 13 August 2006, Hackett scored his first goal of the season, as well as setting up a goal for Danny Morgan, in a 2–2 draw against Wycombe Wanderers. His second goal of the season then came on 13 September 2005, in a 1–1 draw against Bristol Rovers. Hackett appeared in every match from the start of the season until a calf injury at the end of September. He returned from injury on 7 October 2005 in a 1–0 win over Carlisle United. He was again suspended for three matches after being sent off for a dangerous two-footed challenge on Andy Parkinson, in a 3–2 loss against Grimsby Town on 25 November 2005. He returned from suspension on 13 December 2005, starting as Oxford United lost 2–1 to Cheltenham Town in an FA Cup second-round replay. In his final season for Oxford, he made 27 appearances scoring twice in league matches.

=== Heart of Midlothian ===
On 24 January 2006 he joined former Oxford manager Graham Rix at Scottish Premier League club Hearts in a £20,000 deal. Press speculation had previously linked him with a move to Hearts' city rivals Hibernian.

During his time at Tynecastle, Hackett's first-team opportunities were limited to one start and one substitute appearance. His chances were not helped after Graham Rix was sacked less than two months after signing him. In the summer transfer window of 2006, Hackett was expected to leave the club, with Carlisle United expressing interest in signing him. In July 2006 Hackett held talks with Oxford United's local rivals Swindon Town, but the deal fell through over wage demands. It was rumoured that Hackett was demanding a similar contract to the one he was on at Hearts. His agent sounded out lower-league clubs, and Cardiff City, Bristol City and Hull City were all said to be interested.

=== Millwall ===
On 2 August 2006, Hackett signed a two-year contract with League One side Millwall for an undisclosed fee.

Three days later on 5 August 2006, Hackett made his debut for Millwall, coming on as a late substitute in a 1–1 draw against Yeovil Town in the opening game of the season. However, he suffered an injury that saw him sidelined throughout September. He returned from injury on 30 September 2006, coming on as a half-time substitute in a 3–2 win over Rotherham United. Hackett scored his first goal for the club on 14 October 2006, in a 1–0 win over AFC Bournemouth. Two weeks later, on 31 October 2006, he scored against Bournemouth again, in a 2–0 win in the Football League Trophy. This was followed up by scoring in a 3–1 win over Tranmere Rovers. Two weeks later on 18 November 2006, Hackett scored his fourth goal of the season, in a 2–2 draw against Doncaster Rovers. In the first half of the season, Hackett initially started out on the substitute bench before establishing himself in the starting eleven for the side. However, Hackett found himself in and out of the first team, as he appeared in either the starting line-up or on the substitutes' bench. In his first season at Millwall, Hackett went on to make thirty-eight appearances and score four goals in all competitions.

Hackett spent most of the 2007–08 season on the injury list after suffering knee ligament damage. It came after when he sustained an injury against Gillingham on 13 October 2007 and had to be substituted in the 88th minute. As a results, Hackett was ruled out rest of the 2007–08 season. Despite making seven appearances for the side, Hackett signed a six-month contract with Millwall at the end of the 2007–08 season to regain his fitness.

At the start of In the 2008–09 season, Hackett returned from injury, where he made his first appearance for the side, coming on as a late substitute, in a 4–3 loss against Oldham Athletic in the opening game of the season. Since returning to the first team, Hackett quickly regained his first team place for the side under the management of Kenny Jackett and began to play in the full-back position. On 22 September 2008, he committed his long-term future to Millwall, signing a new deal to 2010. In the club's FA Cup campaign throughout November, Hackett set up three goals, including setting up twice, in a 3–0 win over Aldershot Town. Having becoming a key part of Millwall's promotion campaign via the play-offs, Hackett made an appearance in the Football League One play-off final against Scunthorpe United, coming on as a substitute for Lewis Grabban, as Millwall lost 3–2. After the match, Manager Kenny Jackett said about his performance: "I also thought Chris Hackett came on and did very well today – there were some cracking crosses he put in." At the end of the 2008–09 season, he went on to make twenty-eight appearances in all competitions.

In the 2009–10 season, Hackett continued to regain his first team place for the side, playing in the midfield position. After missing two matches, Hackett scored his first Millwall goal for over two years in a 3–1 victory over Huddersfield Town on 19 September 2009. Hackett was in top form and he played a key part, setting up goals over several months, including against Stockport County (twice) and Leeds United. Hackett also played a role throughout Millwall's FA Cup campaign, setting up four goals in five matches before being eliminated by Derby County in the FA Cup third round replay. Then on 1 December 2009, he scored his second goal of the season, in a 3–2 win over Milton Keynes Dons. His performance led to him further extending his contract with the club until 2012. Hackett also played a role when he assisted two matches, setting up a winning goal for Neil Harris in a 2–1 win over Norwich City on 6 February 2010 and then a hat-trick of assists, in a 5–0 win over rivals, Charlton Athletic on 25 February 2010. Although he missed the two semi-finals of the play-offs through injury, he returned to make a substitute appearance in Millwall's victory in the Wembley final on 29 May 2010. Despite being sidelined later in the 2009–10 season, Hackett went on to make forty-eight appearances, scoring two times in all competitions.

At the start of the 2010–11 season, Hackett found himself in the substitute bench role, with James Henry and Danny Schofield preferred in the club's wide midfield position. Between 28 September 2010 and 19 October 2010, he made four starts for the side following absent of midfielders before returning to the substitute role. Between 15 January 2011 and 22 January 2011, Hackett assisted in both of the matches against Ipswich Town and Leicester City. Later in the 2010–11 season, Hackett found his first team opportunities limited further, due to being on the substitute bench and eventually out of the starting eleven. He finished the season, making eighteen appearances in all competitions.

In the 2011–12 season, Hackett made his first start of the season, starting the whole game, in a 1–0 win over Plymouth Argyle in the first round of the League Cup on 9 August 2011. Two weeks later on 24 August 2011 against Morecambe in the second round of the League Cup, where he set up one of the goals, in a 2–0 win. Hackett continued to have his first team opportunities limited at Millwall, even returning from a loan spell at Exeter City and Wycombe Wanderers. At the end of the 2011–12 season, where he made six appearances, Hackett was released by Millwall after six years at the club.

==== Loan spells at Exeter City and Wycombe Wanderers ====
On 24 November 2011, Hackett joined League One side Exeter City on loan for a month until 31 December with the option of extending the deal. Hackett made his Exeter debut on 26 November 2011 at home to Tranmere Rovers putting in a man-of-the-match performance, in which he provided assists for Danny Coles and Richard Logan in a 3–1 win. Hackett was recalled by Millwall on 31 December 2011 following the completion of his loan spell. On the day he was recalled, Hackett made his last appearance for Exeter City, coming off early for Daniel Nardiello in a 2–0 loss against Colchester United. By the time he departed Exeter City, he made five appearances for the side.

After being recalled, Hackett made a brief appearance for Millwall, but on 21 February 2012 he joined League One side Wycombe Wanderers on a one-month loan. A few days later he made his debut for the club in a 5–0 victory over Hartlepool United. In the next match against Scunthorpe United, a 4–1 loss, Hackett suffered a groin injury but he returned to the side on 17 March 2012 in a 4–1 win over Bury. Although suffering an injury, Hackett's loan at Wycombe was extended until the end of the season. Hackett made make eight during the 2011–12 season.

=== Northampton Town ===
On 3 July 2012, Hackett signed a two-year deal with Northampton Town on a free transfer after being released by Millwall, ending a six-year term at the club.

He made his Northampton Town debut, where he started the match before coming off as a substitute in the 56th minute, in a 2–1 win over Cardiff City in the first round of the League Cup. A week later on 21 August 2012, Hackett scored his first goal for the club, in a 2–1 win over Rotherham United. In a follow-up match against Southend United, he set up one of the goals, in a 3–3 draw. A week later on 8 September 2012, Hackett scored his second goal of the season, in a 2–0 win over AFC Wimbledon. Since joining the club, he became a first team regular for the side, playing in the midfield position. Hackett started in every match since the start of the 2012–13 season until he suffered a groin injury that saw him miss two matches. He returned to the starting lineup against York City on 6 November 2012, setting up an equalising goal for Adebayo Akinfenwa, in 1–1 draw. Having been initially out due to illness, Hackett overcome the obstacles and started the whole game, where he scored and set up one of the goals, in a 3–1 win over Wycombe Wanderers on 17 November 2012. His performance earned Hackett the Northampton Audi Player of the Month for December. He later two more goals throughout January against Dagenham & Redbridge and Aldershot Town. Hackett then set up three goals in two matches between 2 February 2013 and 9 February 2013, including twice against Rochdale. For his performance, Hackett was nominated for February's League 2 player of the month, but lost out to Tom Parkes. After being sidelined for two matches, he scored on his return on 9 March 2013, in a 2–0 win over Accrington Stanley. Hackett, once again, set up two goals in two matches between 23 March 2013 and 29 March 2013, against Oxford United and Torquay United. In the League Two play-offs, he played in both legs, setting up a goal in the first leg, eventually winning 2–0 on aggregate against Cheltenham Town to reach the League Two play-off final. However League Two play-off final, Hackett started the whole game, as Northampton Town went on to lose 3–0 against Bradford City. Hackett went on to make forty-nine appearances, scoring six times in all competitions, during the 2012–13 season.

In the 2013–14 season, Hackett missed the first two matches of the season, due to injury he sustained in the pre–season. However, in his first appearance of the season on 17 August 2013, Hackett was sent off in the 23rd minute for a second bookable offence, having received a yellow card in the 13th minute, in a 2–0 loss against Southend United. For the rest of 2013, he found himself suspended or sustained an injury on three more occasions. Despite this, Hackett continued to regain his first team place for the side in the midfield position throughout the season. After being sidelined for "two or three weeks" with a hamstring injury throughout January, he returned to the starting lineup, starting the whole game, in a 2–0 loss against Plymouth Argyle on 8 February 2014. On 25 February 2014, he scored his first goal of the season, in a 2–1 win over Southend United. Then on 5 April 2014, Hackett scored his second goal of the season, in a 1–0 win over Accrington Stanley. In the last game of the season against Oxford United, Hackett started the whole game when he helped the side beat them 3–1, a win that secured Northampton's safety in League Two. At the end of the 2013–14 season, Hackett went on to make forty appearances and scoring two times in all competitions. On 19 May 2014, Hackett agreed a two-year contract extension, keeping him at the club until the end of the 2015–16 season.

At the start of the 2014–15 season, Hackett missed two matches, due to an Achilles injury. He made his return from injury on 19 August 2014, coming on as a substitute in the 64th minute, in a 2–0 loss against Portsmouth. Since returning to the first team from injury, Hackett regained his first team place for the side. During a 2–1 loss against Cambridge United on 14 November 2014, he came off as a substitute in the 56th minute – six minutes after setting up a goal for Ivan Toney; after the match, Manager Chris Wilder said: "Chris Hackett had to come off because of his heart condition." Despite this, he then scored his first goal of the season, in a 3–2 loss against Bury on 26 December 2014. Towards the end of the 2014–15 season, Hackett soon found himself in the substitute bench in a number of matches, due to good forms from Lawson D'Ath and Ricky Holmes. Despite this, he contributed for the side when he scored two more goals between 21 February 2015 and 28 February 2015 against York City and Shrewsbury Town. At the end of the 2014–15 season, making forty appearances and scoring three times in all competitions, Hackett was placed on a transfer list by Manager Chris Wilder.

Ahead the 2015–16 season, Hackett remained at the club, with no clubs were interested in signing him. Despite this, he remain involved in the club's pre-season tour. Hackett's first team opportunities continued to be limited throughout the first half of the season at Northampton Town. Despite this, he scored once for the side, which came against Blackpool in the first round of the League Cup on 11 August 2015. Hackett went on to make nine appearances for Northampton Town throughout the 2015–16 season. At the end of the season, he was released by the club.

After being released by Northampton Town, Hackett said in an interview with the Oxford Mail that he had not given up hope of playing again. Eventually, he announced his retirement from football in the summer.

==== Loan spell at Barnet ====
On 14 January 2016, it was announced that Hackett had joined Barnet on loan until the end of the 2015–16 season.

Hackett made his Barnet debut two days later on 16 January 2016, starting the match before coming off as a substitute in the 58th minute, in a 0–0 draw against Carlisle United. Then, in a match against Dagenham & Redbridge on 13 February 2016, he set up one of the goals, in a 2–0 win. He made five appearances for the Bees but suffered an injury in February and did not play again before the expiry of his loan.

== Post-playing career ==
Having earned his UEFA B badge, Hackett joined Oxford United as under-15s coach in September 2016. In December 2017 his coaching at Oxford turned full-time, as he was offered the role of joint Youth Team manager, alongside Leon Blackmore Such, filling the vacancy left by Andy Whing's move to coach Kidderminster Harriers' under-23 side.

In June 2021, Hackett was promoted to Oxford United's youth manager for both under 19 and under 17 sides. Following the departure of Liam Manning as manager of Oxford United, it was announced that Hackett would be supporting Craig Short, who was appointed as the club's caretaker manager. When Des Buckingham was appointed as Manning's successor, Hackett joined the club's first team coaching staff. For the 2024–25 season, he was promoted to Oxford United's assistant manager.

== Personal life ==
Hackett attended Wheatley Park School. In an interview, Hackett grew up supporting Oxford United, which he went on to play for, and was a former Oxfordshire county sprint champion.

Hackett is married and is a father to three children. After announcing his retirement from football, Hackett revealed that he settled in Oxford with his family.

== Honours ==
Millwall

- Football League One play-offs: 2010

Northampton Town

- Football League Two: 2015–16
