= Alex Nicholls (footballer) =

English footballer (born 1987)

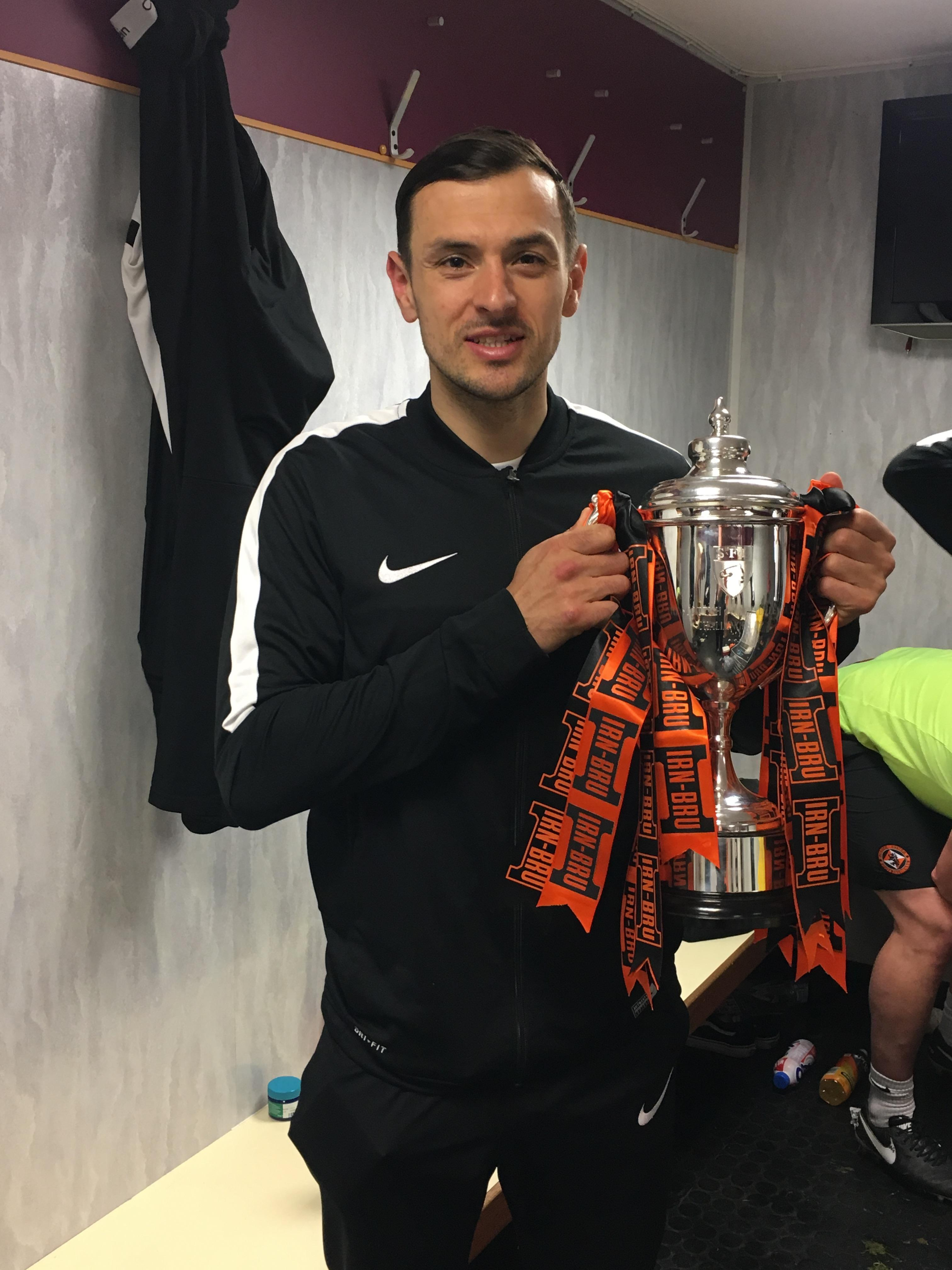
- Nicholls with the Scottish Challenge Cup trophy

Personal information
- Full name: Alex Nicholls
- Date of birth: 9 December 1987 (age 38)
- Place of birth: Stourbridge, England
- Height: 5 ft 10 in (1.78 m)
- Positions: Striker; winger

Youth career
- –2005: Walsall

Senior career*
| Years | Team | Apps | (Gls) |
| 2005–2012 | Walsall | 191 | (24) |
| 2007 | → Burton Albion (loan) | 14 | (0) |
| 2012–2015 | Northampton Town | 21 | (8) |
| 2014 | → Exeter City (loan) | 6 | (1) |
| 2014–2015 | → Exeter City (loan) | 7 | (0) |
| 2015–2016 | Exeter City | 54 | (9) |
| 2016–2018 | Barnet | 42 | (9) |
| 2017 | → Dundee United (loan) | 9 | (0) |
| 2018–2019 | Crewe Alexandra | 21 | (2) |
| 2019 | Solihull Moors | 5 | (1) |
| 2019–2020 | Stourbridge | 6 | (1) |
| Total | | 376 | (55) |

Managerial career
- 2020: Stourbridge (caretaker)
- * Club domestic league appearances and goals as of 20:10, 10 November 2019 (UTC)

Alex Nicholls (born 9 December 1987) is an English former professional footballer who played as both a midfielder and a striker. He has previously played for Walsall, Burton Albion, Northampton Town, Exeter City, Barnet, Dundee United, Crewe Alexandra and Solihull Moors.

== Playing career ==
=== Walsall ===
After impressing in reserve and youth team games, Nicholls broke into Walsall's first team in the 2005–06 season, making his debut in December 2005 in a FA Cup clash with Yeovil Town. In that same season Nicholls went on to make 13 appearances which included a Football League Trophy clash with Swansea City, it was in this game that he scored his first professional goal for the club. However, his season ended prematurely as he broke his leg while playing in a youth cup tie with Hednesford Town.

In 2007, Nicholls went on loan to Burton Albion. He made 14 appearances for the Brewers before returning to Walsall at the end of April. During the 2007–08 season, Nicholls played as both a right winger and a striker, making 24 appearances and scoring three goals, which included an FA Cup goal in an away replay with Millwall.

Nicholls was offered a new two-year contract by the club on 10 May 2010 which he accepted. He scored his first goal of the 2010–11 season against Brentford in a 2–1 victory, by scoring a well placed lob. In his final season for the club he was joint top goal scorer with 8 goals. Nicholls went on to make a total of 219 appearances for the club before leaving on a free transfer in 2012.

=== Northampton Town ===
In June 2012, Nicholls joined League Two side Northampton Town on a free transfer after his contract expired.

Nicholls soon became a fans favourite at the club with his all energy displays and some vital goals, he scored 8 goals in 16 games before his season was ended prematurely when on 27 October he broke his leg after a late challenge from Port Vale defender John McCombe.

=== Exeter City ===
On 1 September 2014, Nicholls joined Exeter City, on a one-month loan deal where he Helped them move clear of the relegation zone. Nicholls completed his permanent move to Exeter City on 5 January 2015. Nicholls played a total of 73 games for Exeter before moving to Barnet

=== Barnet ===
Nicholls joined Barnet on 1 July 2016. He scored on his debut against Cambridge United on 6 August.

Nicholls was loaned to Scottish Championship club Dundee United in January 2017. On 25 March 2017, Nicholls picked up a Scottish Challenge Cup winners medal when Dundee United beat St Mirren F.C. to lift the trophy at Fir Park.

=== Crewe Alexandra ===
On 6 July 2018, Nicholls joined Crewe Alexandra on a one-year contract, and, on his first team debut on 4 August 2018, scored twice during a 6–0 win over Morecambe. At the end of the 2018–19 season, Nicholls was released and was set to leave the club.

=== Solihull Moors ===
On 23 August 2019, Nicholls joined Solihull Moors on a one-month contract.

=== Stourbridge ===
Following the expiry of his short-term contract with Solihull, Nicholls joined Stourbridge. He was caretaker manager in February 2020 in between the departure of Ian Long and the appointment of Mark Yates.

== After football ==
After retiring from football, Nicholls trained to become a firefighter, following his father's career. He began working in the role in August 2021, stationed at Haden Cross Fire Station in Halesowen, West Midlands.

== Career statistics ==
As of match played 11 January 2020

Appearances and goals by club, season and competition
| Club | Season | League | | | FA Cup | | League Cup | | Other (Note: Includes Football League Trophy, Scottish Challenge Cup, Scottish Premiership play-off matches, Birmingham Senior Cup and FA Trophy.) | | Total | |
| Club | Season | Division | Apps | Goals | Apps | Goals | Apps | Goals | Apps | Goals | Apps | Goals |
|---|---|---|---|---|---|---|---|---|---|---|---|---|
| Walsall | 2005–06 | League One | 8 | 0 | 3 | 0 | 0 | 0 | 2 | 1 | 13 | 1 |
| Walsall | 2006–07 | League Two | 0 | 0 | 0 | 0 | 0 | 0 | 0 | 0 | 0 | 0 |
| Walsall | 2007–08 | League One | 19 | 2 | 4 | 1 | 1 | 0 | 1 | 0 | 25 | 3 |
| Walsall | 2008–09 | League One | 45 | 6 | 1 | 0 | 1 | 0 | 2 | 0 | 49 | 6 |
| Walsall | 2009–10 | League One | 37 | 4 | 1 | 0 | 1 | 1 | 1 | 0 | 40 | 5 |
| Walsall | 2010–11 | League One | 37 | 5 | 2 | 0 | 1 | 0 | 0 | 0 | 40 | 5 |
| Walsall | 2011–12 | League One | 45 | 7 | 4 | 1 | 1 | 0 | 2 | 0 | 52 | 8 |
| Walsall | Total | | 191 | 24 | 15 | 2 | 5 | 1 | 8 | 1 | 219 | 28 |
| Burton Albion (loan) | 2006–07 | Conference | 14 | 0 | 0 | 0 | 0 | 0 | 0 | 0 | 14 | 0 |
| Northampton Town | 2012–13 | League Two | 15 | 7 | 0 | 0 | 2 | 1 | 2 | 0 | 19 | 8 |
| Northampton Town | 2013–14 | League Two | 0 | 0 | 0 | 0 | 0 | 0 | 0 | 0 | 0 | 0 |
| Northampton Town | 2014–15 | League Two | 6 | 1 | 1 | 0 | 1 | 0 | 2 | 0 | 10 | 1 |
| Northampton Town | Total | | 21 | 8 | 1 | 0 | 3 | 1 | 4 | 0 | 29 | 9 |
| Exeter City (loan) | 2014–15 | League Two | 6 | 1 | 0 | 0 | 0 | 0 | 0 | 0 | 6 | 1 |
| Exeter City (loan) | 2014–15 | League Two | 7 | 0 | 0 | 0 | 0 | 0 | 0 | 0 | 7 | 0 |
| Exeter City | 2014–15 | League Two | 19 | 4 | 0 | 0 | 0 | 0 | 0 | 0 | 19 | 4 |
| Exeter City | 2015–16 | League Two | 35 | 5 | 4 | 1 | 1 | 1 | 2 | 1 | 42 | 8 |
| Exeter City | Total | | 54 | 9 | 4 | 1 | 1 | 1 | 2 | 1 | 61 | 12 |
| Barnet | 2016–17 | League Two | 17 | 2 | 0 | 0 | 1 | 0 | 2 | 1 | 20 | 3 |
| Barnet | 2017–18 | League Two | 25 | 7 | 1 | 0 | 0 | 0 | 1 | 1 | 27 | 8 |
| Barnet | Total | | 42 | 9 | 1 | 0 | 1 | 0 | 3 | 2 | 47 | 11 |
| Dundee United (loan) | 2016–17 | Scottish Championship | 9 | 0 | 0 | 0 | 0 | 0 | 4 | 0 | 13 | 0 |
| Crewe Alexandra | 2018–19 | League Two | 21 | 2 | 1 | 0 | 1 | 0 | 3 | 2 | 26 | 4 |
| Solihull Moors | 2019–20 | National League | 5 | 1 | 0 | 0 | 0 | 0 | 1 | 0 | 6 | 1 |
| Stourbridge | 2019–20 | SFL Premier Division Central | 6 | 1 | 4 | 1 | 0 | 0 | 5 | 0 | 15 | 2 |
| Career total | | | 376 | 55 | 26 | 4 | 11 | 3 | 30 | 6 | 443 | 68 |

== Honours ==
Dundee United

- Scottish Challenge Cup: 2016–17
