= Lee Nicholls =

English footballer (born 1992)

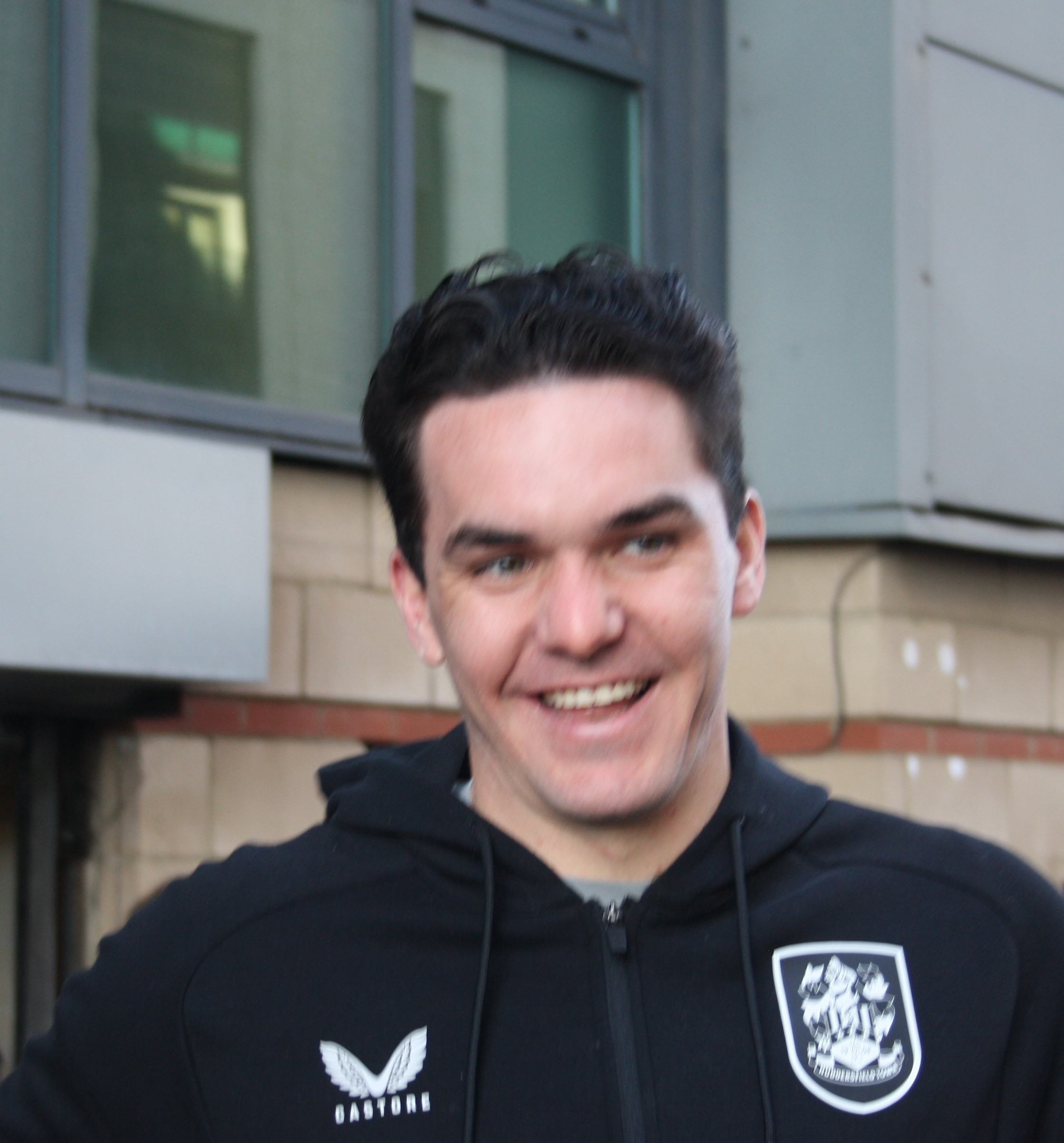
- Nicholls in 2026

Personal information
- Full name: Lee Anthony Nicholls
- Date of birth: 5 October 1992 (age 34)
- Place of birth: Huyton, England
- Height: 6 ft 5 in (1.96 m)
- Position: Goalkeeper

Team information
- Current team: Preston North End
- Number: 21

Youth career
- 2009–2010: Wigan Athletic

Senior career*
Years	Team	Apps	(Gls)
2010–2016	Wigan Athletic	9	(0)
2010	→ Hartlepool United (loan)	0	(0)
2011	→ Shrewsbury Town (loan)	0	(0)
2011	→ Sheffield Wednesday (loan)	0	(0)
2012	→ Accrington Stanley (loan)	9	(0)
2012–2013	→ Northampton Town (loan)	46	(0)
2015–2016	→ Bristol Rovers (loan)	15	(0)
2016–2021	Milton Keynes Dons	131	(0)
2021–2026	Huddersfield Town	152	(0)
2026–	Preston North End	1	(0)

International career^{‡}
2011	England U19	1	(0)
- * Club domestic league appearances and goals as of 31 January 2026 (UTC) ‡ National team caps and goals as of 8 February 2011 (UTC)

Lee Anthony Nicholls (born 5 October 1992) is an English professional footballer who plays as a goalkeeper for EFL Championship club Preston North End.

== Early life ==
Lee Nicholls was born in Huyton, Merseyside.

== Club career ==
=== Wigan Athletic ===
Nicholls signed scholarship forms with Wigan Athletic in the summer of 2009. After a series of impressive performances for the reserve team, he appeared for the first-team as a substitute for the first time on 2 January 2010 in a 4–1 FA Cup third round victory over Hull City.

Later in the month, he signed a two-and-a-half-year professional contract with the club. In January 2012, Nicholls extended his contract at Wigan until 2014. In between loan spells, Nicholls made his league debut on 27 October 2013 in a goalless draw away to Charlton Athletic.

==== Loan spells ====
Between November 2010 and May 2011, Nicholls was sent out on loan to Hartlepool United, Shrewsbury Town and Sheffield Wednesday, but failed to make a single appearance. On 24 February 2012, he joined Accrington Stanley on an initial one-month loan deal. Nicholls later made nine appearances for the club.

On 6 August 2012, Nicholls signed on loan for League Two side Northampton Town until the end of October 2012, and later re-signed on 6 November 2012 until the end of the 2012–13 season.

On 5 May 2013, Nicholls competed for Northampton Town in the League Two play-off semi-final second leg against Cheltenham Town. In total, Nicholls made 51 appearances for Northampton Town, achieving 20 clean sheets before returning to Wigan. On 11 September 2015, Nicholls joined League Two side Bristol Rovers on a three-month loan.

=== Milton Keynes Dons F.C ===
On 3 August 2016, following the expiry of his contract with Wigan, Nicholls joined League One club Milton Keynes Dons, signing a two-year deal. Nicholls made his debut for the club on 9 August 2016, featuring in a 2–3 EFL Cup first round victory over Newport County. In his first season for the club, Nicholls' made a total of sixteen appearances in all competitions, achieving two clean sheets.

Following the departure of first choice goalkeeper David Martin, Nicholls took over the number one shirt for the 2017–18 season. On 29 December 2017, Nicholls signed a contract extension keeping him at the club until June 2020. On 6 May 2021, the club announced Nicholls was one of four players to be released at the end of the 2020–21 season, ending his almost five-year association with MK Dons in which he made over 150 appearances.

=== Huddersfield Town ===
On 26 May 2021, Nicholls signed for EFL Championship club Huddersfield Town on a two-year deal following the expiry of his contract with Milton Keynes Dons on 1 July 2021. He made his debut on 1 August 2021, keeping a clean sheet in a goalless EFL Cup first round draw with Sheffield Wednesday, with Huddersfield progressing to the next round following Nicholls' two penalty shoot-out saves.

He went on to have a successful debut season with the club, achieving 19 clean sheets and playing a key role in Huddersfield reaching the 2022 EFL Championship play-off final. Nicholls was later named in both the EFL Championship Team of the Season and Professional Footballers' Association Team of the Year.

== International career ==
In 2010, Nicholls was named in the England U19 squad that reached the semi-finals of the UEFA European Under-19 Championships, but did not make an appearance in the tournament. He made his debut for the team in February 2011 in a 1–0 defeat against Germany.

== Career statistics ==
As of match played 26 August 2026

Appearances and goals by club, season and competition
Club	Season	League			FA Cup		League Cup		Other		Total	
Club	Season	Division	Apps	Goals	Apps	Goals	Apps	Goals	Apps	Goals	Apps	Goals
Wigan Athletic	2010–11	Premier League	0	0	0	0	—		—		0	0
Wigan Athletic	2011–12	Premier League	0	0	—		—		—		0	0
Wigan Athletic	2012–13	Premier League	0	0	—		—		—		0	0
Wigan Athletic	2013–14	Championship	6	0	0	0	1	0	2 (Note: Appearances in UEFA Europa League.)	0	9	0
Wigan Athletic	2014–15	Championship	1	0	0	0	0	0	—		1	0
Wigan Athletic	2015–16	League One	2	0	0	0	0	0	—		2	0
Wigan Athletic	Total		9	0	0	0	1	0	2	0	12	0
Hartlepool United (loan)	2010–11	League One	0	0	0	0	0	0	—		0	0
Shrewsbury Town (loan)	2010–11	League Two	0	0	0	0	0	0	—		0	0
Sheffield Wednesday (loan)	2010–11	League One	0	0	0	0	0	0	—		0	0
Accrington Stanley (loan)	2011–12	League Two	9	0	0	0	0	0	—		9	0
Northampton Town (loan)	2012–13	League Two	46	0	0	0	0	0	5 (Note: Appearances in Football League Trophy.) (Note: Three appearances in Football League Two play-offs.)	0	51	0
Bristol Rovers (loan)	2015–16	League Two	15	0	1	0	0	0	2	0	18	0
Milton Keynes Dons	2016–17	League One	8	0	2	0	2	0	4	0	16	0
Milton Keynes Dons	2017–18	League One	41	0	4	0	1	0	0	0	46	0
Milton Keynes Dons	2018–19	League Two	40	0	1	0	2	0	0	0	43	0
Milton Keynes Dons	2019–20	League One	35	0	1	0	1	0	1	0	38	0
Milton Keynes Dons	2020–21	League One	7	0	3	0	1	0	3	0	14	0
Milton Keynes Dons	Total		131	0	11	0	7	0	8	0	157	0
Huddersfield Town	2021–22	Championship	43	0	0	0	2	0	3 (Note: Three appearances in EFL Championship play-offs.)	0	48	0
Huddersfield Town	2022–23	Championship	28	0	0	0	1	0	—		29	0
Huddersfield Town	2023–24	Championship	37	0	1	0	0	0	—		38	0
Huddersfield Town	2024–25	League One	23	0	0	0	0	0	0	0	23	0
Huddersfield Town	2025–26	League One	33	0	1	0	3	0	3 (Note: Appearances in EFL Trophy)	0	40	0
Huddersfield Town	Total		164	0	2	0	6	0	6	0	178	0
Preston North End	2026–27	Championship	0	0	0	0	1	0	0	0	1	0
Career total			374	0	14	0	15	0	23	0	426	0

== Honours ==
Bristol Rovers

- Football League Two third-place promotion: 2015–16

Milton Keynes Dons

- EFL League Two third-place promotion: 2018–19

Individual

- Huddersfield Town: Hargreaves Memorial Trophy (Player of the Season) 2021–22
- Huddersfield Town: Blue & White Player of the Season 2021–22
- EFL Championship Team of the Season: 2021–22
- PFA Team of the Year: 2021–22 Championship
