= Joe Widdowson =

English footballer (born 1989)

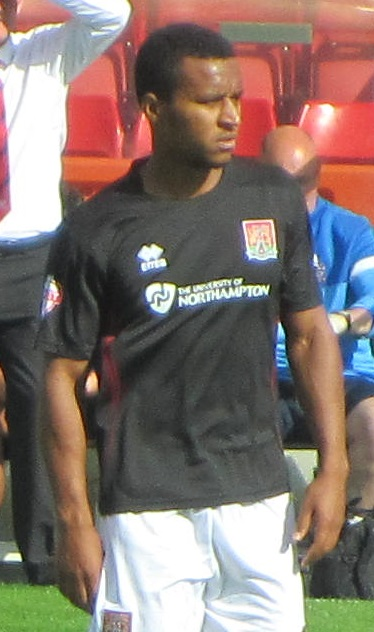
- Widdowson playing for Northampton Town in 2013

Personal information
- Full name: Joseph Widdowson
- Date of birth: 28 March 1989 (age 37)
- Place of birth: Forest Gate, England
- Height: 6 ft 0 in (1.83 m)
- Position: Defender

Youth career
- –2007: West Ham United

Senior career*
Years	Team	Apps	(Gls)
2007–2009	West Ham United	0	(0)
2008	→ Rotherham United (loan)	3	(0)
2009	→ Grimsby Town (loan)	20	(1)
2009–2010	Grimsby Town	38	(0)
2010–2012	Rochdale	66	(0)
2012–2014	Northampton Town	64	(0)
2014–2015	Bury	1	(0)
2014	→ Morecambe (loan)	8	(0)
2014–2015	→ Dagenham & Redbridge (loan)	3	(0)
2015–2017	Dagenham & Redbridge	94	(0)
2017–2021	Leyton Orient	117	(1)
2021–2022	Barnet	9	(3)
Total		423	(5)
- * Club domestic league appearances and goals

Joseph Widdowson (born 28 March 1989) is an English former professional footballer who plays as a defender.

He began his career with Premier League side West Ham United, spending time on loan with Rotherham United. He later signed a permanent contract with Grimsby Town which was the start of an extensive Football League career with Rochdale, Northampton Town, Dagenham & Redbridge and Leyton Orient. His final season was in the National League with Barnet.

== Career ==
=== West Ham United ===
Widdowson began his career as a trainee at West Ham United in July 2007. He joined Football League Two side Rotherham United in February 2008 on a one-month loan, where he made three league appearances. He made his non-competitive debut for West Ham on 17 July 2008 against Hampton & Richmond Borough completing 90 minutes in a 2–4 victory. This match was then followed with a full 90 minutes on 24 July 2008 in the 2008 MLS All-Star Game in Toronto in which Widdowson was handed the difficult task of marking England legend David Beckham. Widdowson impressed many spectators during the game with the way he handled the task set in such a controlled manner, and ended the game swapping shirts with the Los Angeles Galaxy star.

=== Grimsby Town ===
On 2 January 2009 Widdowson joined Grimsby Town on an initial one-month loan. Widdowson made his debut for Grimsby on 17 January 2009 in a 1–0 away victory against Wycombe Wanderers. He scored his first league goal, against Rotherham United, in a 3–0 home win for the Mariners on 24 January 2009. The goal was good enough to win 2nd place in the club's goal of the season awards. Grimsby manager Mike Newell managed to extend Widdowson's loan until the end of the season, and he remained as the club's first choice left back, despite regular starter Tom Newey returning from injury. Newey was then loaned out to Rochdale, and Widdowson became an integral part of the Grimsby side that managed too stave off relegation from the Football League. He was given his first red card for the club on 25 April 2009 after being controversially dismissed in the 87th minute of play for a second bookable offence in the club's relegation crunch tie with AFC Bournemouth. On 18 May 2009, the Mariners announced Widdowson had signed a three-year contract with the club.

=== Rochdale ===
On 22 June 2010 Widdowson signed for Rochdale ahead of the club's first campaign in League One. In May 2012, Widdowson was released from Rochdale after being told his contract would not be renewed.

=== Northampton Town ===
On 5 July 2012 Widdowson joined Northampton Town on a two-year contract.

=== Bury ===
On 6 August 2014, Widdowson signed for Bury just days prior to the start of the new season, having impressed on a short-term trial.

=== Morecambe ===
On 29 August 2014, Widdowson signed for Morecambe on a two-month loan.

=== Dagenham & Redbridge ===
On 27 November 2014, Widdowson joined Dagenham & Redbridge on loan until 4 January 2015. In January 2015, his loan with Dagenham ended and he returned to Bury having made three appearances for the side. Later in the month he signed for Dagenham & Redbridge on a six-month contract until the end of the season after his short-term deal with Bury came to an end.

=== Leyton Orient ===
On 1 July 2017, Widdowson signed for Leyton Orient on a two-year contract. In May 2019, after winning promotion to League Two with the O's, his contract was renewed until 2021. Widdowson was released at the end of the 2020-21 season after 137 appearances for the O's.

=== Barnet ===
Widdowson signed a two-year contract with Barnet in July 2021. He scored three times in ten games for the Bees. After opening the scoring away at Stockport County in October 2021, he was stretchered off after a foul by Macauley Southam-Hales that saw the latter sent off. Widdowson spent the rest of the season out injured and departed the Bees following the conclusion of the season.

== Career statistics ==
As of match played 26 October 2021

Appearances and goals by club, season and competition
Club	Season	League			FA Cup		League Cup		Other		Total	
Club	Season	Division	Apps	Goals	Apps	Goals	Apps	Goals	Apps	Goals	Apps	Goals
West Ham United	2007–08	Premier League	0	0	0	0	0	0	—		0	0
West Ham United	2008–09	Premier League	0	0	0	0	0	0	—		0	0
West Ham United	Total		0	0	0	0	0	0	—		0	0
Rotherham United (loan)	2007–08	League Two	3	0	—		—		—		3	0
Grimbsy Town (loan)	2008–09	League Two	20	1	—		—		—		20	1
Grimbsy Town	2009–10	League Two	38	0	1	0	1	0	1 (Note: Appearance in Football League Trophy)	0	41	0
Grimbsy Town	Total		58	1	1	0	1	0	1	0	61	1
Rochdale	2010–11	League One	34	0	1	0	2	0	1	0	38	0
Rochdale	2011–12	League One	32	0	0	0	3	0	0	0	35	0
Rochdale	Total		66	0	1	0	5	0	1	0	73	0
Northampton Town	2012–13	League Two	39	0	2	0	2	0	4 (Note: Three appearances in Football League Trophy, one in Football League Two play-offs)	0	47	0
Northampton Town	2013–14	League Two	25	0	2	0	1	0	0	0	28	0
Northampton Town	Total		64	0	4	0	3	0	4	0	75	0
Bury	2014–15	League Two	1	0	0	0	0	0	—		1	0
Morecambe (loan)	2014–15	League Two	8	0	—		—		1	0	9	0
Dagenham & Redbridge	2014–15	League Two	21	0	—		—		—		21	0
Dagenham & Redbridge	2015–16	League Two	31	0	2	0	1	0	1	0	35	0
Dagenham & Redbridge	2016–17	National League	45	0	3	0	—		3 (Note: Two appearances in National League play-offs, one in FA Trophy)	0	51	0
Dagenham & Redbridge	Total		97	0	5	0	1	0	4	0	107	0
Leyton Orient	2017–18	National League	36	0	3	0	—		5 (Note: Appearances in FA Trophy)	0	44	0
Leyton Orient	2018–19	National League	44	0	0	0	—		2	0	46	0
Leyton Orient	2019–20	League Two	16	1	1	0	1	0	1	0	19	1
Leyton Orient	2020–21	League Two	21	0	1	0	2	0	4	0	28	0
Leyton Orient	Total		117	1	5	0	3	0	12	0	137	1
Barnet	2021–22	National League	9	3	1	0	—		0	0	10	3
Career total			423	5	17	0	13	0	23	0	476	5

== Honours ==
Leyton Orient

- National League: 2018–19
- FA Trophy runner-up: 2018–19

== Personal life ==
He graduated in 2023 from Staffordshire University with a first-class degree in Professional Sports Writing and Broadcasting.
