= Lewis Hornby =

English footballer

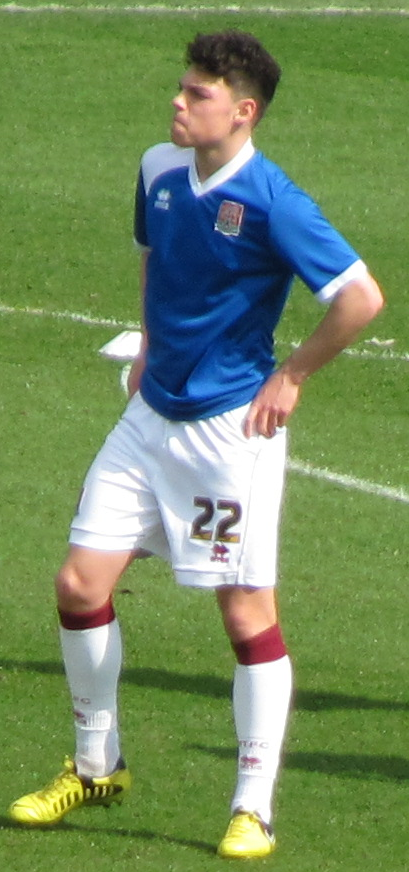
- Hornby warming up for Northampton Town in 2013

Personal information
- Full name: Lewis Paul Ingham Hornby
- Date of birth: 25 April 1995 (age 31)
- Place of birth: Northampton, England
- Height: 6 ft 1 in (1.85 m)
- Position: Midfielder

Youth career
- 2011–2012: Northampton Town

Senior career*
Years	Team	Apps	(Gls)
2012–2015	Northampton Town	25	(0)
2012	→ Kettering Town (loan)	4	(1)
2016–2017	Kettering Town	23	(0)
Total		52	(1)
- * Club domestic league appearances and goals as of 10 June 2017

Lewis Paul Ingham Hornby (born 25 April 1995) is an English footballer who plays as a midfielder.

== Career ==
Hornby started a two-year scholarship with Northampton Town in the summer of 2011. In December 2011, he was awarded his first squad number by manager Aidy Boothroyd. In February 2012, he joined Football Conference side Kettering Town on loan. Hornby then put pen to paper on a new 2 1/2-year deal leading him through to 2015. He made his professional debut on 9 October 2012, in a 2–1 win over Colchester United in the Football League Trophy, coming on as a substitute for Kemar Roofe. Hornby then went on to play in the play off final against Bradford City in which they lost 3–0.

After spending the whole of the 2013–14 season injured and returning from injury late in 2014–15 he was released at the end of the season when his contract expired.

During summer 2015, Hornby spent time on trial with Sheffield Wednesday.

Ahead of the 2016–17 season, Hornby rejoined Kettering Town on a permanent deal.

== Personal life ==
He is the older brother of forward Fraser Hornby. Hornby is of Scottish descent.
