= 2012–13 Football League Trophy =

Johnstone's Paint Trophy

Tournament details
- Country: England; Wales
- Teams: 48

Final positions
- Champions: Crewe Alexandra
- Runners-up: Southend United

Tournament statistics
- Matches played: 49
- Goals scored: 139 (2.84 per match)
- Top goal scorer(s): Dave Mooney (4 goals)

The 2012–13 Football League Trophy, known as the Johnstone's Paint Trophy for sponsorship reasons, is the 32nd season in the history of the competition. It is a knock-out tournament for English football clubs in League One and League Two, the third and fourth tiers of English football.

In all, 48 clubs will enter the competition. It is split into two sections, Northern and Southern, with the winners of each section contesting the final at Wembley Stadium. Chesterfield are the defending champions, having beaten Swindon Town in the previous year's final, 2–0.

== First round ==
The draw for the first round of the competition took place on 18 August 2012. Sixteen clubs were given a bye into the second round, and the remaining 32 clubs, including the holders, were divided into four geographical regions.

=== Northern section ===
Tie no	Home team	Score	Away team	Attendance
North-West
1	Rochdale	2−2	Fleetwood Town	1,256
Rochdale won 4 – 2 on penalties
2	Carlisle United	1−1	Preston North End	3,471
Preston North End won 1 – 3 on penalties
3	Accrington Stanley	0−2	Morecambe	1,049
4	Port Vale	2−0	Tranmere Rovers	2,702
North-East
5	Rotherham United	0−1	York City	3,975
6	Chesterfield	2−1	Oldham Athletic	2,384
7	Coventry City	0−0	Burton Albion	5,437
Coventry City won 10 – 9 on penalties
8	Scunthorpe United	1−2	Notts County	725

=== Southern section ===
Tie no	Home team	Score	Away team	Attendance
South-West
1	Oxford United	1−0	Swindon Town	7,746
2	Bristol Rovers	0−3	Yeovil Town	2,810
3	Portsmouth	2−2	Bournemouth	5,979
Portsmouth won 4 – 3 on penalties
4	Exeter City	0−0	Aldershot Town	1,944
Aldershot Town won 4 – 3 on penalties
South-East
5	Southend United	2−1	AFC Wimbledon	1,925
6	Dagenham & Redbridge	3−2	Stevenage	981
7	Northampton Town	1−0	Milton Keynes Dons	3,444
8	Crawley Town	3−2	Gillingham	1,249

Byes

Northern section
Bradford City, Bury, Crewe Alexandra, Doncaster Rovers, Hartlepool United, Sheffield United, Shrewsbury Town, Walsall.

Southern section
Barnet, Brentford, Cheltenham Town, Colchester United, Leyton Orient, Plymouth Argyle, Torquay United, Wycombe Wanderers.

== Second round ==
The draw for the second round of the competition took place on 8 September 2012, with matches played in the week commencing 8 October 2012.

=== Northern section ===
Tie no	Home team	Score	Away team	Attendance
North-West
1	Shrewsbury Town	1–2	Crewe Alexandra	2,063
2	Rochdale	1–1	Bury	2,826
Bury won 5 – 4 on penalties
3	Morecambe	2–4	Preston North End	2,577
4	Walsall	2–2	Port Vale	2,845
Port Vale won 6 – 5 on penalties
North-East
5	Doncaster Rovers	1–0	Chesterfield	4,030
6	York City	0–4	Coventry City	2,771
7	Notts County	1–4	Sheffield United	2,082
8	Hartlepool United	0–0	Bradford City	1,777
Bradford won 3 – 2 on penalties

=== Southern section ===
Tie no	Home team	Score	Away team	Attendance
South-West
1	Portsmouth	1–3	Wycombe Wanderers	7,292
2	Cheltenham Town	2–4	Oxford United	1,236
3	Torquay United	2–2	Yeovil Town	1,280
Yeovil won 5 – 4 on penalties
4	Plymouth Argyle	2–1	Aldershot Town	2,580
South-East
5	Northampton Town	2–1	Colchester United	1,561
6	Leyton Orient	1–0	Barnet	1,404
7	Brentford	1–0	Crawley Town	2,739
8	Southend United	2–0	Dagenham & Redbridge	2,965

== Area Quarter-finals ==
The draw for the Area Quarter-finals was made on 13 October 2012, and the matches will be played in the week commencing 3 December 2012.

=== Northern section ===
Tie no	Home team	Score	Away team	Attendance
1	Crewe Alexandra	1–1	Doncaster Rovers	1,892
Crewe Alexandra won 5 – 3 on penalties
2	Bury	3–3	Preston North End	2,023
Preston North End won 5 – 4 on penalties
3	Port Vale	0–2	Bradford City	2,789
4	Coventry City	1–1	Sheffield United	10,162
Coventry City won 4 – 1 on penalties

=== Southern section ===
Tie no	Home team	Score	Away team	Attendance
1	Northampton Town	0–3	Leyton Orient	1,752
2	Southend United	2–1	Brentford	3,052
3	Yeovil Town	2–0	Wycombe Wanderers	1,771
4	Plymouth Argyle	1–1	Oxford United	2,383
Oxford United won 3 – 1 on penalties

== Area Semi-finals ==
The draw for the Area Semi-finals was made on 8 December 2012, and the matches were played in the week commencing 7 January 2013.

=== Northern section ===
Tie no	Home team	Score	Away team	Attendance
1	Coventry City	3–2	Preston North End	12,665
2	Crewe Alexandra	4–1	Bradford City	2,935

=== Southern section ===
Tie no	Home team	Score	Away team	Attendance
1	Oxford United	3–3	Southend United	2,882
Southend United won 5 – 3 on penalties
2	Leyton Orient	1–0	Yeovil Town	2,755

== Area finals ==
The area finals, which serve as the semi-finals for the entire competition, were contested over two legs, home and away.

=== Northern section ===
5 February Leg 1	Coventry City	0–3	Crewe Alexandra	Ricoh Arena, Coventry
19:45		Report	Inman 52', 78'; Leitch-Smith 85'	Attendance: 31,054; Referee: Graham Salisbury

20 February Leg 2	Crewe Alexandra	0–2	Coventry City	Alexandra Stadium, Crewe
19:30		Report	Ellis 90+3' (o.g.); L. Clarke 90+4'	Attendance: 8,325; Referee: Graham Scott

Crewe Alexandra won 3–2 on aggregate.

=== Southern section ===
5 February Leg 1	Leyton Orient	0–1	Southend United	Matchroom Stadium, Leyton
19:45		Report	Leonard 57'	Attendance: 5,359; Referee: Keith Stroud

20 February Leg 2	Southend United	2–2	Leyton Orient	Roots Hall, Southend-on-Sea
19:15	Corr 61'; Reeves 90'	Report	Batt 8'; Mooney 72'	Attendance: 9,421; Referee: Andy Woolmer

Southend United won 3–2 on aggregate.

== Final ==
7 April 2013
13:15 BST

Crewe Alexandra	2–0	Southend United
Murphy 6'; Clayton 49'	Report

Wembley Stadium, London
Attendance: 43,842
Referee: Nigel Miller (Durham County)
