= Danny Morgan (footballer, born 1984) =

English footballer (born 1984)

Personal information
- Full name: Daniel Frederick Morgan
- Date of birth: 4 November 1984 (age 41)
- Place of birth: London, England
- Position: Forward

Team information
- Current team: Grays Athletic
- Number: 15

Youth career
- West Ham United
- Wimbledon

Senior career*
Years	Team	Apps	(Gls)
2004–2006	Oxford United	6	(1)
2005	→ Brackley Town (loan)	?	(?)
2005–2006	→ Basingstoke Town (loan)	6	(4)
2006	Billericay Town	?	(?)
2006–2007	Bishop's Stortford	?	(?)
2007	St Albans City	11	(5)
2007–200?	Chesham United	?	(?)
2011	Grays Athletic	6	(1)
- * Club domestic league appearances and goals as of 13:39, 26 March 2011 (UTC)

Daniel Frederick Morgan (born 4 November 1984) is an English football forward who was last attached to Grays Athletic. He played six games in the Football League for Oxford United.

== Biography ==
Morgan was born in London, and trained with West Ham United as a schoolboy, then joined Wimbledon as a trainee, but was released by the club in 2004 without having played for the first team. He joined Oxford United on 18 May 2004 after a successful trial, during which he scored a hat-trick for Oxford's reserves against Bristol Rovers. Morgan made only occasional appearances, mainly as a substitute, and spent time on loan to Southern League club Brackley Town. He scored his first goal for the club, an equaliser at home to Wycombe Wanderers, in August 2005, and then made his first League start, but injury disrupted his progress and in November he was told he was free to leave.

He scored four goals in six Conference South games on loan to Basingstoke Town, but his season was prematurely ended by a fractured jaw. He began the 2006–07 season on a weekly contract at Billericay Town, before joining Bishop's Stortford where he partnered Roy Essandoh. Morgan was released at the end of the season because the club could not guarantee him first-team football, he signed for St Albans City, after a trial with Billericay. He moved on to Chesham United in November 2007. Morgan signed for Isthmian League Division One North club Grays Athletic in February 2011, leaving a month later in March.
