= Sam Barratt =

English footballer

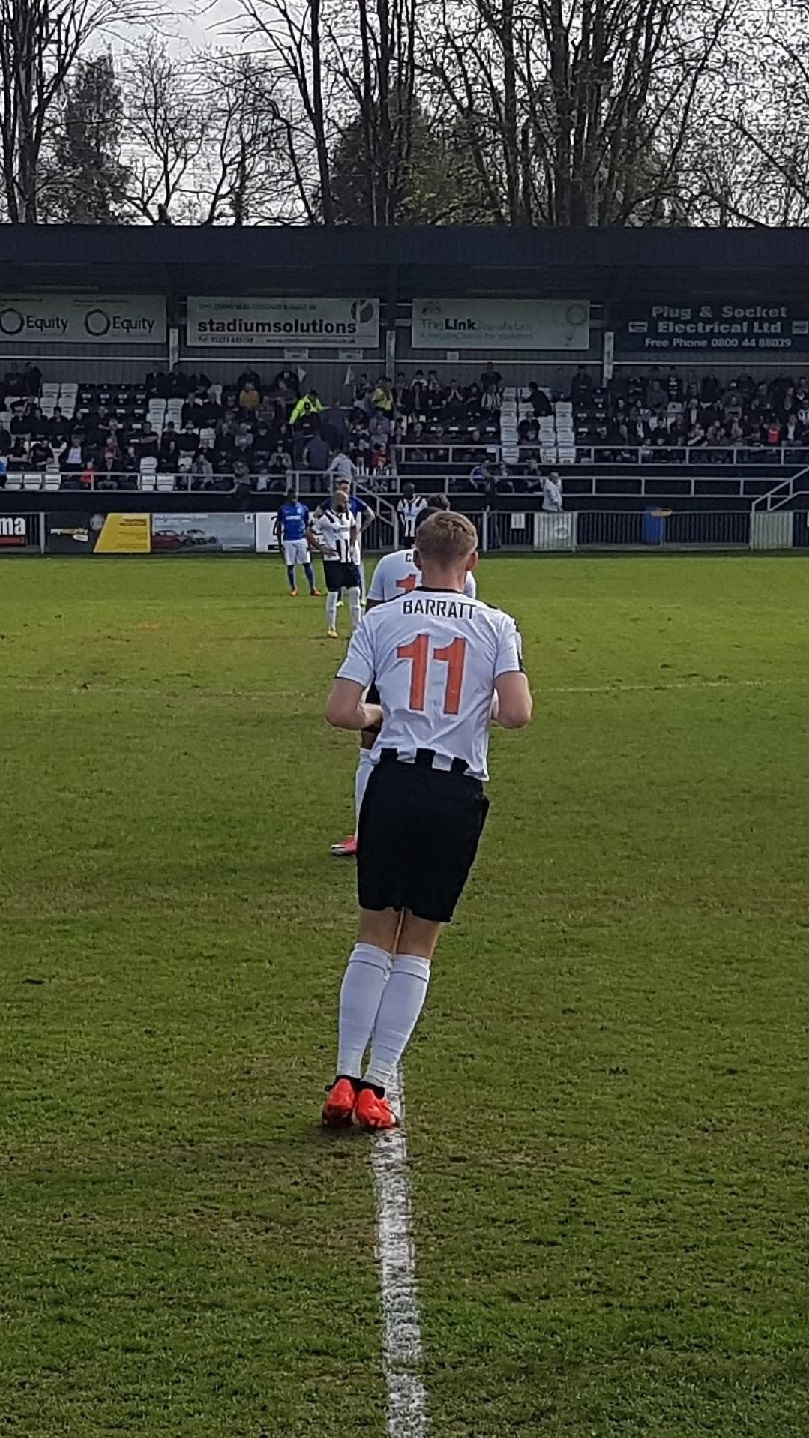
- Barratt lines up for Maidenhead United in 2017.

Personal information
- Full name: Samuel James Barratt
- Date of birth: 25 August 1995 (age 31)
- Place of birth: Reading, England
- Position: Winger

Team information
- Current team: Farnborough
- Number: 7

Youth career
- Woodley Town

Senior career*
Years	Team	Apps	(Gls)
2011–2014	Bracknell Town		
2014–2018	Maidenhead United	97	(12)
2016–2017	→ Staines Town (loan)	7	(0)
2018–2020	Southend United	10	(0)
2020–2023	Maidenhead United	81	(23)
2023	Barnet	6	(0)
2023	→ Maidenhead United (loan)	5	(2)
2023–2026	Maidenhead United	71	(8)
2026–	Farnborough	8	(1)

International career
2017–2018	England C	2	(0)
- * Club domestic league appearances and goals as of 21:48, 22 October 2026 (UTC)

Samuel James Barratt (born 25 August 1995) is an English professional footballer who plays as a winger for Farnborough.

== Career ==
=== Early career ===
Barratt started his career in the youth team at Woodley Town before joining Bracknell Town in 2011 aged 15. Barratt scored on his first team debut as a 16 year old and went on to play "approximately 90 games" for the Robins. In summer 2014, Barratt signed for Maidenhead United. During four seasons at the club he made 97 league appearances – scoring 12 goals – and was part of the team that won the National League South in 2016–17. He combined his non-league football career with his job as an artist. He also had trials at Crystal Palace and Bristol Rovers, as well as a loan spell at Staines Town in December 2016.

=== Southend United ===
In May 2018 it was announced that he would turn professional with Southend United for the 2018–19 season. He made his English Football League debut on the opening day of the season as a substitute in a 2–3 defeat at home to Doncaster Rovers. This was his only appearance before sustaining a "long-term" knee injury in August 2018. Barratt returned to the senior team on 1 January 2020 against AFC Wimbledon. He left Southend on 22 August 2020, having made ten appearances during his time in Essex.

=== Return to Maidenhead United ===
Barratt re-joined Maidenhead on 14 September 2020. After scoring fifteen goals in his first season back with the club, Barratt signed a two-year contract extension in June 2021.

=== Barnet ===
Barratt joined Barnet for the 2023–24 season.

=== Second return to Maidenhead United ===
On 10 November 2023 he re-joined Maidenhead on a one-month loan. Barratt joined Maidenhead again on a permanent deal on 22 December 2023. He left the club at the end of the 2025–26 season.

=== Farnborough ===
Barratt joined Farnborough for the 2026–27 season.

== International career ==
Barratt was called up to the England C team in November 2017 and made his debut against Slovakia. He also played against Wales in March 2018.

== Career statistics ==
As of 17 October 2026

Club	Season	League			FA Cup		League Cup		Other		Total	
Club	Season	Division	Apps	Goals	Apps	Goals	Apps	Goals	Apps	Goals	Apps	Goals
Bracknell Town	2011–12	Hellenic League Premier Division	No data currently available									
Bracknell Town	2012–13	Hellenic League Division One East	No data currently available									
Bracknell Town	2013–14	Hellenic League Premier Division	No data currently available									
Maidenhead United	2014–15	Conference South	12	0	0	0	—		1 (Note: Appearance(s) in the FA Trophy.)	0	13	0
Maidenhead United	2015–16	National League South	29	5	1	0	—		1	0	31	5
Maidenhead United	2016–17	National League South	24	2	0	0	—		4 (Note: One appearance and one goal in FA Trophy, three appearances and one goal in Berks & Bucks Senior Cup)	2	28	4
Maidenhead United	2017–18	National League	32	5	2	1	—		3	1	37	7
Maidenhead United	Total		97	12	3	1	0	0	9	3	109	16
Staines Town (loan)	2016–17	Isthmian League Premier Division	7	0	0	0	—		0	0	7	0
Southend United	2018–19	League One	1	0	0	0	0	0	0	0	1	0
Southend United	2019–20	League One	9	0	0	0	0	0	0	0	9	0
Southend United	Total		10	0	0	0	0	0	0	0	10	0
Maidenhead United	2020–21	National League	29	15	1	0	—		1	0	31	15
Maidenhead United	2021–22	National League	21	7	2	1	—		0	0	23	8
Maidenhead United	2022–23	National League	31	1	2	0	—		2 (Note: One appearance in FA Trophy, one appearance and one goal in Berks & Bucks Senior Cup)	1	35	2
Maidenhead United	Total		81	23	5	1	0	0	3	1	89	25
Barnet	2023–24	National League	6	0	0	0	—		1 (Note: One appearance in Middlesex Senior Cup)	0	7	0
Maidenhead United (loan)	2023–24	National League	5	2	0	0	—		0	0	5	2
Maidenhead United	2023–24	National League	20	1	0	0	—		0	0	20	1
Maidenhead United	2024–25	National League	32	4	3	1	—		4 (Note: One appearance in FA Trophy, three appearances in National League Cup)	1	39	6
Maidenhead United	2025–26	National League South	19	3	0	0	—		4 (Note: One appearance in FA Trophy, two appearances and one goal in Berks & Bucks Senior Cup, one appearance in National League South playoffs)	1	23	4
Maidenhead United	Total		71	8	3	1	0	0	9	2	82	11
Farnborough	2026–27	National League South	8	1	1	0	—		0	0	9	1
Career total			276	45	11	3	0	0	22	6	308	54
