= 2013–14 Ipswich Town F.C. season =

Ipswich Town
2013–14 season
- Chairman: Marcus Evans
- Manager: Mick McCarthy
- Stadium: Portman Road
- Championship: 9th
- FA Cup: Third round
- League Cup: First round
- Top goalscorer: League: David McGoldrick (14); All: David McGoldrick (16)
- Highest home attendance: 20,862 (vs. Sheffield Wednesday, 3 May 2014, Championship)
- Lowest home attendance: 13,534 (vs. Preston North End, 4 January 2014, FA Cup)
- Average home league attendance: 17,111
Home colours	Away colours	Third colours

The 2013–14 season was Ipswich Town's 12th consecutive season in the Football League Championship, the second-highest division in the English football league system. In addition to competing in The Championship, Ipswich Town also competed in the League Cup and the FA Cup.

Ipswich finished the season in 9th position in the league.

== First-team squad ==
Note: Flags indicate national team as defined under FIFA eligibility rules; some limited exceptions apply. Players may hold more than one non-FIFA nationality.

No.	Pos.	Nation	Player
1	GK	ENG	Scott Loach
3	DF	ENG	Aaron Cresswell
4	DF	ENG	Luke Chambers (captain)
5	DF	NZL	Tommy Smith
6	DF	SCO	Christophe Berra
8	MF	ENG	Cole Skuse
9	FW	IRL	Daryl Murphy
10	FW	ENG	David McGoldrick
11	MF	ENG	Paul Anderson
12	MF	IRL	Stephen Hunt
14	MF	ENG	Anthony Wordsworth
15	DF	ENG	Tyrone Mings

No.	Pos.	Nation	Player
16	MF	IRL	Paul Green (on loan from Leeds United)
18	MF	IRL	Jay Tabb
19	MF	ENG	Luke Hyam
20	DF	SUI	Frédéric Veseli
22	GK	ENG	Dean Gerken
23	MF	ENG	Alex Henshall (on loan from Manchester City)
24	DF	ENG	Frazer Richardson (on loan from Middlesbrough)
25	MF	WAL	Jonny Williams (on loan from Crystal Palace)
26	FW	ENG	Paul Taylor
27	FW	ENG	Sylvan Ebanks-Blake
29	FW	IRL	Alan Lee
35	FW	ENG	Frank Nouble

=== Out on loan ===
Note: Flags indicate national team as defined under FIFA eligibility rules; some limited exceptions apply. Players may hold more than one non-FIFA nationality.

No.	Pos.	Nation	Player
2	DF	WAL	Elliott Hewitt (on loan to Gillingham)
7	MF	TTO	Carlos Edwards (on loan to Millwall)
16	MF	ENG	Ryan Tunnicliffe (loan return to Manchester United)

No.	Pos.	Nation	Player
17	MF	ENG	Jordan Graham (loan return to Aston Villa)
34	FW	ENG	Jack Marriott (on loan to Woking)

== First-team coaching staff ==
Position	Name
Manager	(Republic of Ireland) Mick McCarthy
Assistant Manager	(England) Terry Connor
Goalkeeping Coach	(England) Malcolm Webster
Fitness Coach	(Scotland) Andy Liddell
Head Physiotherapist	(England) Matt Byard
Assistant Head Physiotherapist	(England) Alex Chapman
Kitman	(England) Paul Beesley

== Pre-season ==
6 July 2013	Shelbourne	0–2	Ipswich Town	Tolka Park
15:00		Report	Murphy 46', 52'

10 July 2013	Crawley Town	1–2	Ipswich Town	Broadfield Stadium
19:45	Adams 63'	Report	Murphy 9'; McGoldrick 51' (pen.)	Attendance: 1,029

13 July 2013	Chippenham Town	0–1	Ipswich Town	Hardenhuish Park
13:00		Report	Ward 89'

16 July 2013	Gillingham	1–2	Ipswich Town	Priestfield Stadium
19:30	McDonald 46'		McGoldrick 22'; October 90'

20 July 2013	Barnet	0–1	Ipswich Town	The Hive
15:15		Report	McGoldrick 41'

23 July 2013	Colchester United	0–3	Ipswich Town	Weston Homes Community Stadium
19:45		Report	Chambers 27'; McGoldrick 32'; Murphy 75' (pen.)	Attendance: 4,585

27 July 2013	Notts County	3–3	Ipswich Town	Meadow Lane
15:00	Haynes 35'; Smith 60'; Arquin 77'		Hyam 15'; Murphy 23'; Taylor 57'	Attendance: 1,532

== Competitions ==
=== Football League Championship ===
==== League table ====
Pos	Team	Pld	W	D	L	GF	GA	GD	Pts
7	Reading	46	19	14	13	70	56	+14	71
8	Blackburn Rovers	46	18	16	12	70	62	+8	70
9	Ipswich Town	46	18	14	14	60	54	+6	68
10	Bournemouth	46	18	12	16	67	66	+1	66
11	Nottingham Forest	46	16	17	13	67	64	+3	65

Source: BBC Sport
Rules for classification: 1) points; 2) goal difference; 3) number of goals scored

==== Results summary ====
Overall								Home						Away					
Pld	W	D	L	GF	GA	GD	Pts	W	D	L	GF	GA	GD	W	D	L	GF	GA	GD
46	18	14	14	60	54	+6	68	12	6	5	35	24	+11	6	8	9	25	30	−5

Last updated: 3 May 2014.
Source: Table

==== Results by round ====
Round	1	2	3	4	5	6	7	8	9	10	11	12	13	14	15	16	17	18	19	20	21	22	23	24	25	26	27	28	29	30	31	32	33	34	35	36	37	38	39	40	41	42	43	44	45	46
Ground	A	H	A	H	A	H	H	A	H	A	A	H	A	H	A	H	A	H	H	A	H	A	A	H	H	A	H	A	H	A	H	A	H	A	A	H	A	H	H	A	A	H	A	H	A	H
Result	L	W	L	L	D	W	W	L	W	D	D	L	D	D	W	L	W	W	W	D	D	W	D	D	L	L	W	D	W	D	D	L	W	L	W	L	W	W	D	L	W	W	L	D	L	W
Position	19	9	15	17	16	15	11	14	9	10	11	11	13	10	11	12	11	8	9	10	9	5	6	6	9	10	7	7	7	7	8	10	9	9	9	9	9	8	8	9	8	7	8	8	10	9

Updated to match(es) played on 3 May 2014. Source: Fixtures Table
A = Away; H = Home; W = Win; D = Draw; L = Loss

==== August ====
3 August 2013 1	Reading	2–1	Ipswich Town	Madejski Stadium
15:00	Le Fondre 45'; Guthrie 75'	Report	Tabb 16'

10 August 2013 2	Ipswich Town	3–0	Millwall	Portman Road
15:00	Lowry 63' (o.g.); Smith 70'; Anderson 83'; Hewitt (yellow card) 87'	Report	Derry (yellow card) 40'; Morison (yellow card) 45'	Attendance: 17,183; Referee: Salisbury

17 August 2013 3	Queens Park Rangers	1–0	Ipswich Town	Loftus Road
15:00	Hitchcock 90'	Report	Tabb (yellow card) 61'	Attendance: 17,075; Referee: Taylor

24 August 2013 4	Ipswich Town	1–2	Leeds United	Portman Road
15:00	McGoldrick 12'	Report	Varney 28'; McCormack 49'; Austin (yellow card) 56'	Attendance: 18,322; Referee: Dean

31 August 2013 5	Birmingham City	1–1	Ipswich Town	St Andrew's
15:00	Robinson (yellow card) 16'; Burke 76'	Report	Berra 30'; Hyam (yellow card) 86'	Attendance: 14,328; Referee: Drysdale

==== September ====
14 September 2013 6	Ipswich Town	3–1	Middlesbrough	Portman Road
15:00	McGoldrick 34', 90+2'; Chambers 57', (yellow card) 64'; Hyam (yellow card) 87'	Report	Adomah 12'; Whitehead (yellow card) 24'	Attendance: 15,276; Referee: Linington

17 September 2013 7	Ipswich Town	2–1	Yeovil Town	Portman Road
19:45	Murphy 53'; Cresswell 60'	Report	Joel Grant 43'	Attendance: 15,340; Referee: Deadman

22 September 2013 8	Wigan Athletic	2–0	Ipswich Town	DW Stadium
15:00	Shotton 12'; Powell 90'	Report	Berra (yellow card) 42'; Smith (yellow card) 56'	Attendance: 13,747; Referee: Adcock

28 September 2013 9	Ipswich Town	2–0	Brighton & Hove Albion	Portman Road
15:00	McGoldrick 20', 24'	Report	Barnes (yellow card) 77'	Attendance: 16,474; Referee: Martin

==== October ====
1 October 2013 10	Derby County	4–4	Ipswich Town	Pride Park Stadium
19:45	Whitbread 12'; Bryson 47', 87'; Ward 61'; Eustace (yellow card) 66'	Report	Berra 7'; Murphy 9', 34'; Cresswell 14' (yellow card) 85'; Tunnicliffe (yellow card) 68'; McGoldrick (yellow card) 74'; Skuse (yellow card) 80'; Nouble (yellow card) 93+3'	Attendance: 21,307; Referee: Kettle

5 October 2013 11	Sheffield Wednesday	1–1	Ipswich Town	Hillsborough Stadium
15:00	Antonio 14'; Johnson (yellow card) 90'	Report	Anderson 12'; Smith (yellow card) 78'	Attendance: 19,599; Referee: Haines

19 October 2013 12	Ipswich Town	0–1	Burnley	Portman Road
15:00		Report	Arfield 80'	Attendance: 16,062; Referee: Scott

26 October 2013 13	Bolton Wanderers	1–1	Ipswich Town	Reebok Stadium
15:00	Kamara 65'; Baptiste (yellow card) 87'	Report	Berra (yellow card) 64'; McGoldrick 73'	Attendance: 15,222; Referee: Webb

==== November ====
1 November 2013 14	Ipswich Town	1–1	Barnsley	Portman Road
19:45	Murphy 41'; Creswell (red card) 90'	Report	O'Brien 70'	Attendance: 18,361; Referee: D'Urso

9 November 2013 15	Blackpool	2–3	Ipswich Town	Bloomfield Road
15:00	Dobbie 23'; Davies 90+2'	Report	Nouble 65'; Taylor 84'; Hunt (yellow card) 87'; Murphy 90+3'	Attendance: 13,525; Referee: Williamson

16 November 2013 16	Ipswich Town	1–2	Leicester City	Portman Road
15:00	McGoldrick 2'; Chambers (yellow card) 50'	Report	Nugent 51', 57'	Attendance: 18,227; Referee: Langford

30 November 2013 17	Charlton Athletic	0–1	Ipswich Town	The Valley
15:00	Morrison (yellow card) 90+4'	Report	Smith 5'; Tabb (yellow card) 71'; Nouble (yellow card) 90+4'	Attendance: 16,645; Referee: Duncan

==== December ====
3 December 2013 18	Ipswich Town	3–1	Blackburn Rovers	Portman Road
19:45	Hyam 4'; Edwards 48'; Berra (yellow card) 66'; Nouble 86', (yellow card) 89'	Report	Campbell (yellow card) 25'; Rhodes 30'; Marshall (yellow card) 89'	Attendance: 14,953; Referee: Graham

7 December 2013 19	Ipswich Town	2–1	Huddersfield Town	Portman Road
15:00	McGoldrick 50'; Murphy 89'	Report	Ward 35'	Attendance: 15,386; Referee: Sutton

14 December 2013 20	Nottingham Forest	0–0	Ipswich Town	City Ground
15:00	Cox (yellow card) 15'; Lansbury (yellow card) 60'	Report	Cresswell (yellow card) 60'	Attendance: 20,966; Referee: Mathieson

21 December 2013 21	Ipswich Town	1–1	Watford	Portman Road
15:00	Smith (yellow card) 12'; McGoldrick 73' (pen.)	Report	Pudil (yellow card) 60'; Ekstrand (yellow card) 72'; Thorne (yellow card) 77'; Deeney 81'	Attendance: 16,385; Referee: Scott

26 December 2013 22	Doncaster Rovers	0–3	Ipswich Town	Keepmoat Stadium
15:00	Quinn (yellow card) 80'	Report	McGoldrick 24', 51'; Chambers 30'	Attendance: 7,753; Referee: Harrington

29 December 2013 23	Bournemouth	1–1	Ipswich Town	Bournemouth
15:00	Pitman 74'	Report	Murphy 59'; Hyam (yellow card) 79'	Stadium: Dean Court; Attendance: 11,096; Referee: Phil Gibbs

==== January ====
1 January 2014 24	Ipswich Town	1–1	Charlton Athletic	Portman Road
15:00	Wood 24' (o.g.); Berra (yellow card) 40'; Smith (yellow card) 45+4'; Nouble (yellow card) 90+6'	Report	Stewart (yellow card) 40'; Cook (yellow card) 69'; Kermorgant (yellow card) 78'; Jackson 90+1'	Attendance: 18,731; Referee: Stuart Attwell

11 January 2014 25	Ipswich Town	1–3	Queens Park Rangers	Portman Road
15:00	Hyam (yellow card) 23'; Smith 90+1'	Report	Kranjčar 52'; Hill (yellow card) 58'; O'Neil 66'; Traoré 74'	Attendance: 18,369; Referee: Dowd

18 January 2014 26	Millwall	1–0	Ipswich Town	The Den
15:00	Fredericks 40'; Malone (yellow card) 45+7'	Report	Edwards (yellow card) 45+8'; Taylor (yellow card) 89'	Attendance: 12,125; Referee: Ilderton

25 January 2014 27	Ipswich Town	2–0	Reading	Portman Road
15:00	Hunt (yellow card) 54'; Murphy 62'; Anderson 90+1', (yellow card) 90+4'	Report	Pearce (yellow card) 50'	Attendance: 15,323; Referee: Madley

28 January 2014 28	Leeds United	1–1	Ipswich Town	Elland Road
19:45	McCormack 62'	Report	McGoldrick 57'; Skuse (yellow card) 79'	Attendance: 20,461; Referee: D. Webb

==== February ====
1 February 2014 29	Ipswich Town	1–0	Bolton Wanderers	Portman Road
15:00	Berra (yellow card) 42'; McGoldrick 55' (pen.)	Report		Attendance: 15,429; Referee: Breakspear

8 February 2014 30	Barnsley	2–2	Ipswich Town	Oakwell
15:00	O'Grady 12'; Cywka 74'	Report	Berra 81'; McGoldrick 84'	Attendance: 9,929; Referee: Bond

15 February 2014 31	Ipswich Town	0–0	Blackpool	Portman Road
15:00		Report	Haroun (yellow card) 33'; MacKenzie (yellow card) 50'; Perkins (yellow card) 67'	Attendance: 16,010; Referee: Haywood

22 February 2014 32	Leicester City	3–0	Ipswich Town	King Power Stadium
15:00	Wasilewski (yellow card) 16'; Vardy 19'; Nugent 31'; Wood 88'	Report	Tabb (yellow card) 17'	Attendance: 28,078; Referee: Linington

==== March ====
1 March 2014 33	Ipswich Town	1–0	Birmingham City	Portman Road
15:00	Murphy 38'; Skuse (yellow card) 89'	Report	Žigić (yellow card) 39'; Spector (yellow card) 60'	Attendance: 15,598; Referee: Keith Stroud

8 March 2014 34	Middlesbrough	2–0	Ipswich Town	Riverside Stadium
15:00	Graham 29', 45+2'; Ledesma (yellow card) 70'	Report	Hyam (yellow card) 52'; Chambers (yellow card) 71'	Attendance: 13,965; Referee: Williamson

11 March 2014 35	Yeovil Town	0–1	Ipswich Town	Huish Park
19:45	Edwards (yellow card) 68'	Report	Hyam (yellow card) 34'; Berra 40'; Hunt (yellow card) 61'	Attendance: 5,920; Referee: Simon Hooper

15 March 2014 36	Ipswich Town	1–3	Wigan Athletic	Portman Road
15:00	Smith 19'; Hunt (yellow card) 56'; Green (yellow card) 67'	Report	McClean 22', 77', (yellow card) 38'; Barnett 42'; Ramis (yellow card) 57'	Attendance: 16,047; Referee: Coote

22 March 2014 37	Brighton & Hove Albion	0–2	Ipswich Town	Falmer Stadium
15:00	Bruno (yellow card) 33'	Report	Smith 60', (yellow card) 79'; Murphy 80'	Attendance: 29,093; Referee: Darren Drysdale

25 March 2014 38	Ipswich Town	2–1	Derby County	Portman Road
19:45	Williams (yellow card) 66', (goal) 68'; Nouble (yellow card) 78'; Berra 90+1'	Report	Bamford 1'; Martin (yellow card) 15'; Bryson (yellow card) 45+3'; Thorne (yellow card) 51'; Forsyth (yellow card) 84'	Attendance: 17,399; Referee: Graham

29 March 2014 39	Ipswich Town	1–1	Nottingham Forest	Portman Road
15:00	Williams (yellow card) 79'; Murphy 78'	Report	Collins 4'; Halford (yellow card) 27'; Jara (yellow card) 47'; Fox (yellow card) 73'; Darlow (yellow card) 90+2'	Attendance: 17,955; Referee: Madley

==== April ====
5 April 2014 40	Blackburn Rovers	2–0	Ipswich Town	Ewood Park
15:00	Kilgallon (yellow card) 56'; Williamson (yellow card) 63'; Rhodes 64'; Gestede 80'	Report	Wordsworth (yellow card) 37'; Chambers (yellow card) 51'	Attendance: 13,281; Referee: Keith Stroud

8 April 2014 41	Huddersfield Town	0–2	Ipswich Town	John Smith's Stadium
19.45	Gobern (yellow card) 86'	Report	Anderson 6'; Murphy 33'; Hunt (yellow card) 68'	Attendance: 11,857; Referee: Brown

12 April 2014 42	Ipswich Town	2–1	Doncaster Rovers	Portman Road
15.00	Berra (yellow card) 40'; Murphy 47'; Chambers 86'	Report	Brown (yellow card) 16', (goal) 83'; Sharp (yellow card) 17'; Méïté (yellow card) 44'	Attendance: 19,496; Referee: Scott

19 April 2014 43	Watford	3–1	Ipswich Town	Vicarage Road
15.00	Riera 21'; Angella (yellow card) 60' (goal) 63'; McGugan 65', (yellow card) 70'; Tőzsér (yellow card) 83'	Report	Wordsworth 50'	Attendance: 16,615; Referee: Sutton

21 April 2014 44	Ipswich Town	2–2	Bournemouth	Portman Road
15.00	Anderson 36'; Green 56'	Report	Cook 44'; Ritchie 80'	Attendance: 20,356; Referee: D'Urso

26 April 2014 45	Burnley	1–0	Ipswich Town	Turf Moor
15.00	Kightly 54'	Report	Smith (yellow card) 25'; Williams (yellow card) 82'	Attendance: 14,574; Referee: Linington

==== May ====
3 May 2014 46	Ipswich Town	2–1	Sheffield Wednesday	Portman Road
12.15	Smith 37', (yellow card) 60'; Green 67'	Report	Onyewu (yellow card) 36'; Lee 55'	Attendance: 20,862; Referee: Boyeson

=== FA Cup ===
4 January 2014 Third round	Ipswich Town	1–1	Preston North End	Portman Road
15:00	McGoldrick 38'	Report	Davies 42'; Wright (yellow card) 69'	Attendance: 13,534; Referee: Naylor

14 January 2014 Third round replay	Preston North End	3–2	Ipswich Town	Deepdale
19:45	Hayhurst (yellow card) 50'; Garner 68', 68', 88'	Report	Nouble 58'; Berra (yellow card) 72'; McGoldrick 76' (yellow card) 90+4'; Hyam (yellow card) 84'; Mings (yellow card) 90+6'	Attendance: 6,088; Referee: Keith Stroud

=== Football League Cup ===
6 August 2013 First round	Stevenage	2–0	Ipswich Town	Broadhall Way
19:45	Morais 51' (pen.); Burrow 76'	Report	Anderson (yellow card) 61'

== Transfers ==
=== Transfers in ===
Date	Position	Nationality	Name	From	Fee	Ref.
5 April 2013	CF	(England)	David McGoldrick	(England) Nottingham Forest	Free transfer	
14 May 2013	DM	(England)	Cole Skuse	(England) Bristol City	Free transfer	
5 June 2013	LM	(Republic of Ireland)	Jay Tabb	(England) Reading	Free transfer	
7 June 2013	CF	(Republic of Ireland)	Daryl Murphy	(Scotland) Celtic	Free transfer	
8 July 2013	RM	(England)	Paul Anderson	(England) Bristol City	Player swap	
12 July 2013	GK	(England)	Dean Gerken	(England) Bristol City	Free transfer	
17 July 2013	CF	(Republic of Ireland)	Alan Lee	(England) Huddersfield Town	Free transfer	
19 July 2013	CB	(Switzerland)	Frédéric Veseli	(England) Manchester United	Free transfer	
20 July 2013	CB	(Scotland)	Christophe Berra	(England) Wolverhampton Wanderers	Free transfer	
23 July 2013	LM	(Republic of Ireland)	Jack Doherty	(Republic of Ireland) Waterford	Undisclosed (Note: Fee reported as £50,000)	
8 November 2013	LM	(Republic of Ireland)	Stephen Hunt	Free agent	Free transfer	
19 December 2013	CF	(England)	Sylvan Ebanks-Blake	(England) Wolverhampton Wanderers	Free transfer	

=== Loans in ===
Date from	Position	Nationality	Name	From	Date until	Ref.
26 July 2013	CM	(England)	Ryan Tunnicliffe	(England) Manchester united	29 January 2014	
28 November 2013	LW	(England)	Jordan Graham	(England) Aston Villa	9 January 2014	
8 February 2014	CM	(Republic of Ireland)	Paul Green	(England) Leeds United	4 May 2014	
25 January 2014	RB	(England)	Frazer Richardson	(England) Middlesbrough	4 May 2014	
27 February 2014	AM	(Wales)	Jonny Williams	(England) Crystal Palace	4 May 2014	
24 March 2014	LM	(England)	Alex Henshall	(England) Manchester City	4 May 2014	

=== Transfers out ===
Date	Position	Nationality	Name	To	Fee	Ref.
17 June 2013	LW	(England)	Andy Drury	(England) Crawley Town	Free transfer	
1 July 2013	GK	(Wales)	Jason Brown	(England) Cambridge United	Free transfer	
1 July 2013	LB	(England)	Joe Whight	(England) Bury Town	Free transfer	
1 July 2013	RM	(Northern Ireland)	Cormac Burke	Free agent	Free transfer	
4 July 2019	AM	(England)	Lee Martin	(England) Millwall	Free transfer	
8 July 2013	CF	(England)	Jay Emmanuel-Thomas	(England) Bristol City	Player swap	
14 July 2013	RB	(England)	Jack Ainsley	(England) Lowestoft Town	Free transfer	
25 July 2013	CF	(England)	Michael Chopra	(England) Blackpool	Free transfer	
16 August 2013	GK	(England)	Arran Lee-Barrett	(England) Millwall	Free transfer	
25 August 2013	CF	(Republic of Ireland)	Ronan Murray	(England) Notts County	Free transfer	
12 September 2013	LW	(Northern Ireland)	Josh Carson	(England) York City	Free transfer	

=== Loans out ===
Date from	Position	Nationality	Name	To	Date until	Ref.
26 September 2013	CF	(England)	Paul Taylor	(England) Peterborough United	27 October 2013	
8 November 2013	CF	(England)	Jack Marriott	(England) Woking	1 January 2014	
13 November 2013	RB	(Wales)	Elliott Hewitt	(England) Gillingham	1 June 2014	
31 December 2013	CB	(Switzerland)	Frédéric Veseli	(England) Bury	5 April 2014	
3 January 2014	CF	(England)	Jack Marriott	(England) Gillingham	25 January 2014	
30 January 2014	CF	(England)	Jack Marriott	(England) Woking	1 June 2014	
20 February 2014	LM	(Republic of Ireland)	Jack Doherty	(Republic of Ireland) Waterford	30 June 2014	
27 March 2014	RB	(Trinidad and Tobago)	Carlos Edwards	(England) Millwall	4 May 2014	

== Squad statistics ==
All statistics updated as of end of season

=== Appearances and goals ===
No.	Pos	Nat	Player	Total		Championship		FA Cup		League Cup	
No.	Pos	Nat	Player	Apps	Goals	Apps	Goals	Apps	Goals	Apps	Goals
Goalkeepers
1	GK	(England) ENG	Scott Loach	8	0	5+1	0	2	0	0	0
22	GK	(England) ENG	Dean Gerken	42	0	41	0	0	0	1	0
Defenders
3	DF	(England) ENG	Aaron Cresswell	45	2	42+2	2	1	0	0	0
4	DF	(England) ENG	Luke Chambers	48	3	46	3	1	0	1	0
5	DF	(New Zealand) NZL	Tommy Smith	47	6	45	6	1	0	1	0
6	DF	(Scotland) SCO	Christophe Berra	45	5	41+1	5	2	0	1	0
15	DF	(England) ENG	Tyrone Mings	18	0	4+12	0	2	0	0	0
20	DF	(Switzerland) SUI	Frédéric Veseli	1	0	0	0	0	0	1	0
24	DF	(England) ENG	Frazer Richardson	7	0	3+4	0	0	0	0	0
Midfielders
8	MF	(England) ENG	Cole Skuse	44	0	43	0	0	0	1	0
11	MF	(England) ENG	Paul Anderson	33	5	22+9	5	1	0	1	0
12	MF	(Republic of Ireland) IRL	Stephen Hunt	24	0	15+8	0	1	0	0	0
14	MF	(England) ENG	Anthony Wordsworth	11	1	6+4	1	1	0	0	0
16	MF	(Republic of Ireland) IRL	Paul Green	14	2	6+8	2	0	0	0	0
18	MF	(Republic of Ireland) IRL	Jay Tabb	30	1	14+13	1	2	0	1	0
19	MF	(England) ENG	Luke Hyam	38	1	33+2	1	2	0	1	0
25	MF	(Wales) WAL	Jonny Williams	13	1	11+2	1	0	0	0	0
Forwards
9	FW	(Republic of Ireland) IRL	Daryl Murphy	46	13	42+3	13	0	0	0+1	0
10	FW	(England) ENG	David McGoldrick	34	16	30+1	14	0+2	2	0+1	0
26	FW	(England) ENG	Paul Taylor	21	1	4+14	1	0+2	0	1	0
27	FW	(England) ENG	Sylvan Ebanks-Blake	10	0	1+8	0	1	0	0	0
29	FW	(Republic of Ireland) IRL	Alan Lee	1	0	0	0	0+1	0	0	0
34	FW	(England) ENG	Jack Marriott	1	0	0+1	0	0	0	0	0
35	FW	(England) ENG	Frank Nouble	41	3	16+22	2	2	1	1	0
Players featured for club but left before the season ended
2	DF	(Wales) WAL	Elliott Hewitt	5	0	4	0	0	0	1	0
7	MF	(Trinidad and Tobago) TTO	Carlos Edwards	18	1	9+6	1	2	0	0+1	0
16	MF	(England) ENG	Ryan Tunnicliffe	29	0	23+4	0	1+1	0	0	0
17	MF	(England) ENG	Jordan Graham	2	0	0+2	0	0	0	0	0

Last updated: end of season
Source: Competitions

=== Goalscorers ===
No.	Pos	Nat	Player	Championship	FA Cup	League Cup	Total
10	FW	(England)	David McGoldrick	14	2	0	16
9	FW	(Republic of Ireland)	Daryl Murphy	13	0	0	13
5	DF	(New Zealand)	Tommy Smith	6	0	0	6
6	DF	(Scotland)	Christophe Berra	5	0	0	5
11	MF	(England)	Paul Anderson	5	0	0	5
4	DF	(England)	Luke Chambers	3	0	0	3
35	FW	(England)	Frank Nouble	2	1	0	3
3	DF	(England)	Aaron Cresswell	2	0	0	2
7	MF	(Trinidad and Tobago)	Carlos Edwards	1	0	0	1
18	MF	(Republic of Ireland)	Jay Tabb	1	0	0	1
19	MF	(England)	Luke Hyam	1	0	0	1
25	MF	(Wales)	Jonny Williams	1	0	0	1
26	FW	(England)	Paul Taylor	1	0	0	1
Own goal				2	0	0	2
Total				57	3	0	60

=== Assists ===
No.	Pos	Nat	Player	Championship	FA Cup	League Cup	Total
3	DF	(England)	Aaron Cresswell	12	0	0	12
9	FW	(Republic of Ireland)	Daryl Murphy	4	0	0	4
10	FW	(Republic of Ireland)	David McGoldrick	4	0	0	4
35	FW	(England)	Frank Nouble	4	0	0	4
8	MF	(England)	Cole Skuse	3	0	0	3
5	DF	(New Zealand)	Tommy Smith	2	0	0	2
7	MF	(Trinidad and Tobago)	Carlos Edwards	1	1	0	2
12	MF	(Republic of Ireland)	Stephen Hunt	2	0	0	2
15	DF	(England)	Tyrone Mings	2	0	0	2
16	MF	(England)	Ryan Tunnicliffe	2	0	0	2
4	DF	(England)	Luke Chambers	1	0	0	1
6	DF	(Scotland)	Christophe Berra	1	0	0	1
11	MF	(England)	Paul Anderson	1	0	0	1
25	MF	(Wales)	Jonny Williams	1	0	0	1
26	FW	(England)	Paul Taylor	1	0	0	1
Total				41	1	0	42

=== Clean sheets ===
No.	Nat	Player	Championship	FA Cup	League Cup	Total
22	(England)	Dean Gerken	10	0	0	10
1	(England)	Scott Loach	2	0	0	2
Total			12	0	0	12

=== Disciplinary record ===
No.	Pos	Nat	Player	Championship		FA Cup		League Cup		Total	
No.	Pos	Nat	Player	Yellow card	Red card	Yellow card	Red card	Yellow card	Red card	Yellow card	Red card
2	DF	(Wales)	Elliott Hewitt	2	0	0	0	0	0	2	0
3	DF	(England)	Aaron Cresswell	2	1	0	0	0	0	2	1
4	DF	(England)	Luke Chambers	4	0	0	0	0	0	4	0
5	DF	(New Zealand)	Tommy Smith	7	0	0	0	0	0	7	0
6	DF	(Scotland)	Christophe Berra	6	0	1	0	0	0	7	0
7	MF	(Trinidad and Tobago)	Carlos Edwards	1	0	0	0	0	0	1	0
8	MF	(England)	Cole Skuse	3	0	0	0	0	0	3	0
10	FW	(England)	David McGoldrick	1	0	1	0	0	0	2	0
11	MF	(England)	Paul Anderson	1	0	0	0	1	0	2	0
12	MF	(Republic of Ireland)	Stephen Hunt	5	0	0	0	0	0	5	0
14	MF	(England)	Anthony Wordsworth	1	0	0	0	0	0	1	0
15	DF	(England)	Tyrone Mings	1	0	1	0	0	0	2	0
16	MF	(Republic of Ireland)	Paul Green	1	0	0	0	0	0	1	0
16	MF	(England)	Ryan Tunnicliffe	1	0	0	0	0	0	1	0
18	MF	(Republic of Ireland)	Jay Tabb	3	0	0	0	0	0	3	0
19	MF	(England)	Luke Hyam	6	0	1	0	0	0	7	0
25	MF	(Wales)	Jonny Williams	3	0	0	0	0	0	3	0
26	FW	(England)	Paul Taylor	1	0	0	0	0	0	1	0
35	FW	(England)	Frank Nouble	5	0	0	0	0	0	5	0
Total				54	1	4	0	1	0	59	1

== Awards ==
=== Player awards ===
Award	Player	Ref
Player of the Year	(Scotland) Christophe Berra	
Players' Player of the Year	(England) David McGoldrick	
Young Player of the Year	(England) Kyle Hammond	
Goal of the Season	(Wales) Jonny Williams	

=== Football League Championship Player of the Month ===
Month	Player	Ref
September	(England) David McGoldrick	

=== PFA Championship Team of the Year ===
Player	Ref
(England) Aaron Cresswell	
