= Miles Mitchell-Nelson =

English footballer

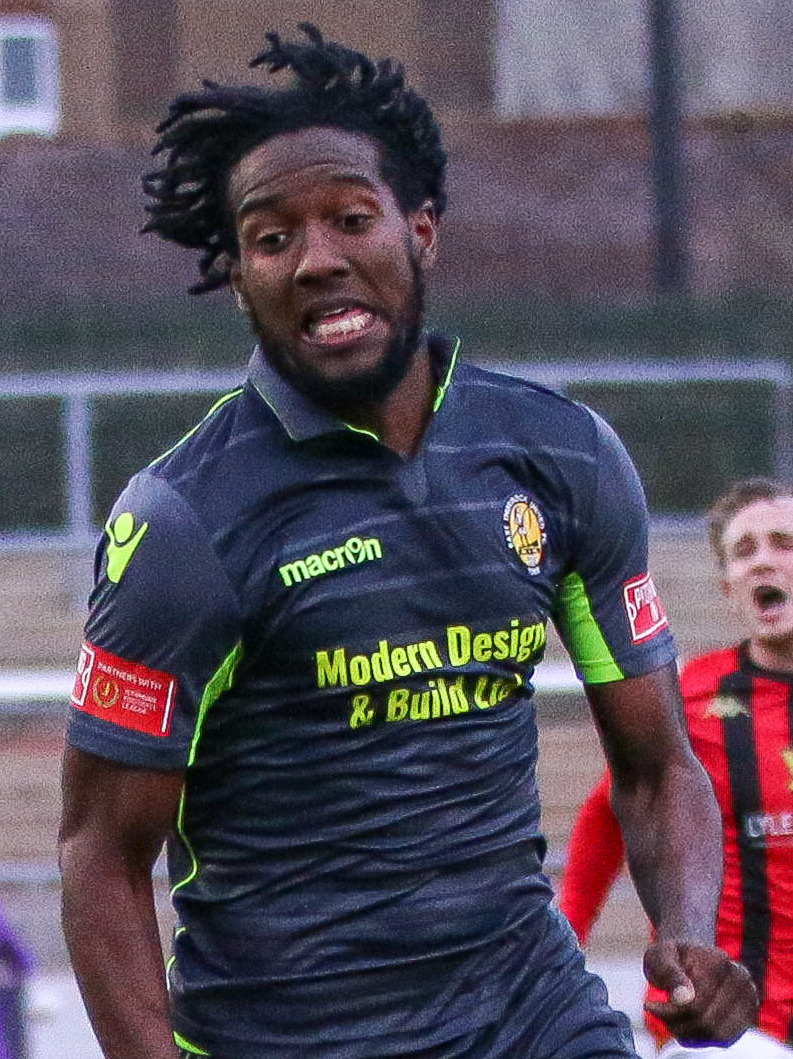
- Mitchell-Nelson playing for East Thurrock United in February 2022

Personal information
- Full name: Miles Nathaniel Mitchell-Nelson
- Date of birth: 24 November 2000 (age 25)
- Place of birth: Waltham Forest, England
- Position: Defender

Team information
- Current team: East Thurrock United (on loan from Southend United)

Youth career
- Ryan
- 2017–2018: Southend United

Senior career*
| Years | Team | Apps | (Gls) |
| 2018– | Southend United | 6 | (0) |
| 2019–2020 | → Harlow Town (loan) | 20 | (1) |
| 2022– | → East Thurrock United (loan) | 0 | (0) |
- * Club domestic league appearances and goals as of 20:50, 22 January 2022 (UTC)

Miles Nathaniel Mitchell-Nelson (born 24 November 2000) is an English professional footballer who plays as a defender for East Thurrock United, on loan from Southend United.

== Career ==
In 2017, Mitchell-Nelson signed for Southend United from Essex Olympian League club Ryan. On 24 April 2019, Mitchell-Nelson was named on the bench in a 3–0 away win against Oldham Athletic. During the first half of the 2019–20 Isthmian League season, Mitchell-Nelson was loaned to Harlow Town, before being recalled by Southend in January 2020. On 1 February 2020, Mitchell-Nelson made his debut for Southend in a 2–1 victory against Lincoln City.

On 22 January 2022, Mitchell-Nelson joined Isthmian League Premier Division side East Thurrock United on a one-month loan deal.

== Career statistics ==
As of match played 7 March 2020

Appearances and goals by club, season and competition
| Club | Season | League | | | FA Cup | | League Cup | | Other | | Total | |
| Club | Season | Division | Apps | Goals | Apps | Goals | Apps | Goals | Apps | Goals | Apps | Goals |
|---|---|---|---|---|---|---|---|---|---|---|---|---|
| Southend United | 2019–20 | League One | 6 | 0 | 0 | 0 | 0 | 0 | 0 | 0 | 6 | 0 |
| Career total | | | 6 | 0 | 0 | 0 | 0 | 0 | 0 | 0 | 6 | 0 |
