= Rob Howard (footballer) =

English footballer (born 1999)

Personal information
- Full name: Robert William Howard
- Date of birth: 15 September 1999 (age 27)
- Place of birth: Chelmsford, England
- Height: 5 ft 11 in (1.80 m)
- Position: Midfielder

Team information
- Current team: Carshalton Athletic

Youth career
- 2011–2014: Southend United
- 2014–2016: Arsenal
- 2016–2018: Colchester United
- 2018–2019: Southend United

Senior career*
Years	Team	Apps	(Gls)
2019–2022	Southend United	5	(0)
2019	→ Harlow Town (loan)	5	(0)
2019	→ Dartford (loan)	7	(0)
2020	→ Braintree Town (loan)	4	(0)
2021	→ King's Lynn Town (loan)	16	(0)
2022	→ Farnborough (loan)	2	(0)
2022–2023	Welling United	23	(0)
2023–2024	Bishop's Stortford	12	(0)
2024–2026	Bedford Town	11	(3)
2025–2026	→ Potters Bar Town (dual-registration)	10	(0)
2026–	Carshalton Athletic	1	(0)
- * Club domestic league appearances and goals as of 09:39, 1 April 2026 (UTC)

Robert William Howard (born 15 September 1999) is an English footballer who plays as a midfielder for Isthmian League Premier Division club Carshalton Athletic.

After playing youth football for Southend United, Arsenal and Colchester United, Howard started his career at Harlow Town, on loan from Southend United, making his debut in 2019. Loan spells at Dartford and Braintree Town followed, before making his senior debut for Southend United in League Two in December 2020. He joined King's Lynn Town on loan in March 2021 and spent the remainder of the season at the club.

== Early life ==
Born in Chelmsford, Howard grew up in Billericay.

== Career ==
=== Early career ===
Howard started his youth career at Southend United at the age of 11, before joining Arsenal as a 14-year-old. He joined Colchester United in 2016, signing a two-year scholarship in May of that year, but was released in 2018 at the end his scholarship deal.

=== Return to Southend United ===
Howard returned to Southend United on a one-year deal in July 2018. Howard joined Harlow Town on loan for the remainder of the season in March 2019, for whom he made 5 appearances. The club activated an extension clause in his contract at the end of the 2018–19 season. He joined Dartford on a month-long loan in August 2019, and made 7 league appearances. He joined Braintree Town on loan in January 2020, for whom he made 4 league appearances. He was offered a new one-year contract with the option of a further year in summer 2020. He made his senior debut for the club on 19 December 2020 in a league win over Mansfield Town. On 22 March 2021, Howard joined National League side King's Lynn Town on loan until the end of the season. Having made his debut for the club the following day, starting in a 3–0 league defeat away to Altrincham, Howard made 16 appearances for King's Lynn Town across his loan spell. On 11 February 2022, Howard joined Southern League Premier Division South side Farnborough on loan for the remainder of the 2021–22 season.

=== Welling United ===
On 3 June 2022, Howard signed for Welling United.

On 9 May 2023, Howard left Welling United.

=== Bishop's Stortford ===
In July 2023, Howard signed for National League North club Bishop's Stortford following a spell with the club on trial.

=== Bedford Town ===
In November 2024, Howard tore his anterior cruciate ligament whilst playing for Bedford against Bromsgrove Sporting in the Southern League Premier Division Central. Following successful reconstruction surgery, Howard returned to full fitness in December 2025. Shortly after his return to full fitness, he joined Potters Bar Town on a dual-registration basis.

=== Carshalton Athletic ===
In March 2026, Howard joined Carshalton Athletic.

== Career statistics ==
As of 15 April 2023

Appearances and goals by club, season and competition
Club	Season	League			FA Cup		EFL Cup		Other		Total	
Club	Season	Division	Apps	Goals	Apps	Goals	Apps	Goals	Apps	Goals	Apps	Goals
Southend United	2018–19	League One	0	0	0	0	0	0	0	0	0	0
Southend United	2019–20	League One	0	0	0	0	0	0	0	0	0	0
Southend United	2020–21	League Two	2	0	0	0	0	0	0	0	2	0
Southend United	2021–22	National League	3	0	1	0	—		0	0	4	0
Southend United	Total		5	0	1	0	0	0	0	0	6	0
Harlow Town (loan)	2018–19	Isthmian League Premier Division	5	0	0	0	—		0	0	5	0
Dartford (loan)	2019–20	National League South	7	0	0	0	—		0	0	7	0
Braintree Town (loan)	2019–20	National League South	4	0	0	0	—		0	0	4	0
King's Lynn Town (loan)	2020–21	National League	16	0	0	0	—		0	0	16	0
Farnborough (loan)	2021–22	Southern League Premier Division South	2	0	0	0	—		0	0	2	0
Welling United	2022–23	National League South	23	0	0	0	—		1 (Note: One appearance in the London Senior Cup)	0	24	0
Potters Bar Town	2025–26	Isthmian League Premier Division	10	0	0	0	—		0	0	10	0
Career total			72	0	1	0	0	0	1	0	74	0
