= Stephen Humphrys =

English footballer (born 1997)

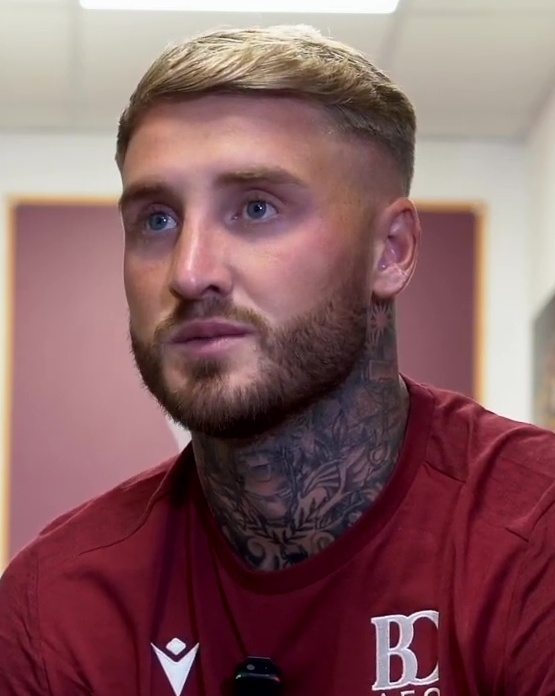
- Humphrys in 2025

Personal information
- Full name: Stephen Peter Humphrys
- Date of birth: 15 September 1997 (age 29)
- Place of birth: Oldham, England
- Height: 1.85 m (6 ft 1 in)
- Position: Forward

Team information
- Current team: Bradford City
- Number: 11

Youth career
- –2013: Bury
- 2013–2016: Fulham

Senior career*
Years	Team	Apps	(Gls)
2016–2019	Fulham	2	(0)
2017	→ Shrewsbury Town (loan)	14	(2)
2018	→ Rochdale (loan)	16	(2)
2018–2019	→ Scunthorpe United (loan)	16	(4)
2019–2020	Southend United	31	(10)
2020–2021	Rochdale	29	(11)
2021–2024	Wigan Athletic	78	(14)
2022–2023	→ Heart of Midlothian (loan)	19	(3)
2024–2025	Barnsley	37	(9)
2025–	Bradford City	41	(9)
- * Club domestic league appearances and goals as of 22 November 2026 (UTC)

Stephen Peter Humphrys (born 15 September 1997) is an English professional footballer who plays as a forward for EFL League One side Bradford City.

== Club career ==
=== Fulham ===
Born in Oldham, England, Humphrys began his football career at Bury before moving to Fulham in the summer of 2013. He quickly progressed through to the U18 squad for three years since joining the club's academy. Humphrys was awarded with his first professional contract with Fulham in the summer of 2014.

In the summer of 2016, Humphrys joined Fulham's first team squad in the pre-season tour. He scored four times out of the eight matches in the club's pre-season tour. Following this, Humphrys was promoted to Fulham's U23, where he began to score regularly. On 17 December 2016, he made his professional debut in the EFL Championship against Derby County at Craven Cottage, coming on as a late substitute, in a 2-2 draw. Humphrys made another appearance in the club's first team as a substitute, in a 2-1 loss against Brighton & Hove Albion on 2 January 2017.

Following his loan spell at Shrewsbury Town came to an end, Humphrys continued to feature for Fulham's U23, including scoring in EFL Trophy match against Portsmouth.

==== Loan spells from Fulham ====
On 26 January 2017, Humphrys signed a new contract with Fulham and joined League One side Shrewsbury Town on loan for the rest of the season in January 2017. Two days later on 28 January 2017, he made his debut for the club, coming on as a 71st minute substitute, in a 1-1 draw against Gillingham. After missing one match due to an illness, Humphrys scored on his return from the sidelined, only for him to be sent-off for a second bookable offence, in a 2-1 loss against Peterborough United. After serving a one match suspension, he scored on his return once again, in a 2-1 loss against Milton Keynes Dons on 25 February 2017. Following this, Humphrys found his playing time from the substitute bench for the rest of the season. At the end of the 2016-17 season, he went on to make fourteen appearances and scoring two times in all competitions. Following this, Humphrys returned to his parent club.

On 31 January 2018, Fulham announced Humphrys would be joining Rochdale on loan for the remainder of the season. He made his debut for the club, coming on as a late substitute, in a 1-0 win against Northampton Town on 2 February 2018. Humphrys then scored his first Rochdale goal, in a 6-1 loss against Tottenham Hotspur in the fifth round replay of the FA Cup. Since joining the club, he became a first team regular as the first-choice striker. Humphrys then scored two more goals for Rochdale, coming against Rotherham United and Portsmouth. At the end of the 2017-18 season, he made eighteen appearances and scoring three times in all competitions. Following this, Humphrys returned to his parent club.

On 6 July 2018, Humphrys was loaned out to Scunthorpe United on loan for the remainder of the season He scored on his debut for the club, as well as, setting up the goal, in a 2-1 win against Coventry City in the opening game of the season. As a result, Humphrys was awarded Scunthorpe United's Goal of the Month for August. Since joining the club, Humphrys became a first team regular, playing in either as a forward or right-wing positions. His goalscoring form continued when he scored four goals throughout October. In a match against Lincoln City in the EFL Trophy match on 9 October 2018, he started the whole game to help Scunthorpe United go to penalty shootout following a 1-1 draw, only for him to miss the decisive penalty, which saw the opposition team win on a shootout. However, Humphrys continued to suffer from injuries along the way. On 3 January 2019, he returned to his parent club. By the time Humphrys left the club, he made nineteen appearances and scoring five times in all competitions.

=== Southend ===
On 19 January 2019, Humphrys joined Southend United on a permanent deal from Fulham, scoring two goals on his debut, in a 4–0 win at Bradford that same day.

On 25 February 2019, he suffered a collision with Accrington Stanley goalkeeper Johnny Maxted as he won a header which would result in a goal. In the process, he suffered a fractured cheekbone and eye socket and 15 broken bones in his face, leading to metal plates being inserted and the need for a face mask to be worn for the rest of the season. Following surgery in early March, he also underwent another operation after the end of the season.

On 5 May 2019 Humphrys came off the bench to score the winning goal for Southend in a 2–1 win over Sunderland. The goal saved Southend from relegation to League Two.

=== Rochdale ===
On 11 September 2020, Humphrys signed a two-year deal with Rochdale for an undisclosed fee.

=== Wigan Athletic ===
In July 2021 he joined Wigan Athletic. He scored his first goal for the club in an EFL Cup tie against Hull City on 10 August 2021.

=== Heart of Midlothian ===
In August 2022, Humphrys signed for Scottish Premiership team Hearts on a season long loan. He scored his first goal for the club in a league match against Kilmarnock on 9 October 2022.

Humphrys' place in Hearts folklore was sealed on 4 February 2023 when he scored from his own half in a 3–1 win over Dundee United.

On 10 May 2024, Wigan announced that he would be released in the summer when his contract expired.

=== Barnsley ===
Humphrys signed for Barnsley on 30 August 2024 on a one year deal, with an option for a second year.

Humphrys was offered a new contract in the summer of 2025, but rejected the offer to join newly-promoted League One rivals Bradford City.

=== Bradford City ===
On June 20 2025, Bradford City announced the signing of Stephen Humphrys on a two-year deal.

Humphrys made his league debut for the club on the first game of the season, a 2-1 home victory against Wycombe Wanderers.

He scored his first goal for the club on August 16, 2025 as the opener in a 2-1 home victory against Luton Town.

Humphrys also scored against former clubs Barnsley and Wigan Athletic in games that ended in a 2-2 draw and a 2-1 win respectively.

== Career statistics ==
As of 14 May 2026

Club	Season	League			National Cup (Note: Includes FA Cup, Scottish Cup)		League Cup (Note: Includes EFL Cup)		Other		Total	
Club	Season	Division	Apps	Goals	Apps	Goals	Apps	Goals	Apps	Goals	Apps	Goals
Fulham	2016–17	Championship	2	0	1	0	0	0	—		3	0
Fulham	2017–18	Championship	0	0	0	0	0	0	—		0	0
Fulham	2018–19	Premier League	0	0	0	0	0	0	—		0	0
Fulham	Total		2	0	1	0	0	0	0	0	3	0
Shrewsbury Town (loan)	2016–17	League One	14	2	0	0	0	0	0	0	14	2
Fulham U23	2017–18	—	—		—		—		1 (Note: Appearances in EFL Trophy)	1	1	1
Rochdale (loan)	2017–18	League One	16	2	2	1	0	0	0	0	18	3
Scunthorpe United (loan)	2018–19	League One	16	4	0	0	1	1	3	0	20	5
Southend United	2018–19	League One	10	5	0	0	0	0	0	0	10	5
Southend United	2019–20	League One	21	5	0	0	1	0	1	0	23	5
Southend United	2020–21	League Two	0	0	0	0	1	0	1	1	2	1
Southend United	Total		31	10	0	0	2	0	2	1	35	11
Rochdale	2020–21	League One	29	11	0	0	0	0	0	0	29	11
Wigan Athletic	2021–22	League One	38	5	4	0	3	1	4	1	49	7
Wigan Athletic	2022–23	Championship	2	0	0	0	1	0	—		3	0
Wigan Athletic	2023–24	League One	38	9	3	1	1	0	4	1	46	11
Wigan Athletic	Total		78	14	7	1	5	1	8	2	98	18
Heart of Midlothian (loan)	2022–23	Scottish Premiership	19	3	2	1	0	0	4 (Note: Appearances in UEFA Europa Conference League)	1	25	5
Barnsley	2024–25	League One	37	9	2	0	1	0	1	0	41	9
Bradford City	2025–26	League One	38	7	1	0	2	0	5 (Note: Four appearances and two goals in EFL Trophy, one appearance in League One play-offs)	2	46	9
Bradford City	2026–27	League One	0	0	0	0	0	0	0	0	0	0
Bradford City	Total		38	7	1	0	2	0	5	2	46	9
Career total			280	62	15	3	11	2	24	7	330	74

== Honours ==
Wigan Athletic

- EFL League One: 2021–22
