= Harry Lennon =

English footballer (born 1994)

Personal information
- Full name: Harry George Lennon
- Date of birth: 16 December 1994 (age 31)
- Place of birth: Romford, England
- Height: 6 ft 3 in (1.91 m)
- Position: Defender

Youth career
- 2003–2013: Charlton Athletic

Senior career*
Years	Team	Apps	(Gls)
2013–2018	Charlton Athletic	33	(2)
2014	→ Cambridge United (loan)	2	(0)
2014	→ Gillingham (loan)	2	(0)
2015	→ Gillingham (loan)	6	(2)
2018–2021	Southend United	34	(1)
2021–2023	Wrexham	18	(2)
Total		95	(7)
- * Club domestic league appearances and goals as of 17:10, 20 February 2023 (UTC)

Harry George Lennon (born 16 December 1994) is an English former professional footballer who played as a defender.

He began his career with Charlton Athletic, having progressed through the youth academy before signing a professional contract in 2012. Whilst with the Addicks he played in 33 league games, scoring twice and spending time on loan with Cambridge United and Gillingham before signing a permanent contract with Southend United in 2018. In 2021 he signed for Wrexham and despite his second season being blighted by injury, he was part of the squad that was promoted back to the Football League in 2023. At the end of the 2022–23 season, Lennon announced his immediate retirement from professional football at the age of 28 due to on-going injury issues.

== Career ==
=== Charlton Athletic ===
Born in Romford, England, Lennon joined Charlton Athletic's academy and once captained the U18 squad. In December 2012, Lennon signed his first professional contract at the club. One year later in December, Lennon signed a new contract with the club, which will keep him until June 2016.

Lennon made his first team debut for Charlton Athletic in the 1–0 FA Cup fourth round away win against Huddersfield Town, where he came on as a substitute for Cedric Evina in the first half. His performance left the away Charlton's supporters very impressed. After this, Lennon made his league debut for the club on 28 January 2014, however he could not prevent Charlton losing 3–0 to Doncaster Rovers.

On 22 July 2014 Lennon joined Cambridge United on loan until 3 January 2015, but was recalled to Charlton on 31 October 2014 after making only two league appearances for Cambridge and one Football League Trophy start.

On 27 November 2014, Lennon joined Gillingham on a youth loan deal. After three matches as an un-used substitute, Lennon made his Gillingham debut, playing 90 minutes, in a 2–1 win over Colchester United on 26 December 2014. After making two appearances for the club, Lennon made his return to his parent club in January 2015.

On 2 October 2015, Lennon re-joined Gillingham on a one-month youth loan deal. Subsequently, the loan was extended until 12 December 2015. On 20 November 2015, Lennon returned to Charlton Athletic and signed a new two-and-a-half-year contract. He became a regular in the side playing in the Championship.

He signed a new one-year contract with Charlton at the end of the 2017–18 season.

=== Southend United ===
On 22 June 2018, Lennon signed a permanent deal with Southend United.

In November 2019, Lennon faced criticism after a video emerged of him with an opposition player in a pub after a defeat in the FA Cup against Dover Athletic, who were two divisions below Southend at the time. He was made to train with the youth team and was dropped for Southend's next match. In December he suffered a suspected broken leg in a game against Bolton Wanderers.

=== Wrexham ===
On 22 July 2021, Lennon signed a one-year deal with Wrexham. Following defeat in the play-offs, Lennon signed a new one-year contract with the club ahead of the 2022–23 season.

On 15 May 2023, at the age of 28, Lennon announced that he was retiring from professional football due to injury.

== Career statistics ==
Appearances and goals by club, season and competition
Club	Season	League			FA Cup		League Cup		Other		Total	
Club	Season	Division	Apps	Goals	Apps	Goals	Apps	Goals	Apps	Goals	Apps	Goals
Charlton Athletic	2013–14	Championship	2	0	1	0	0	0	0	0	3	0
Charlton Athletic	2014–15	Championship	0	0	0	0	0	0	0	0	0	0
Charlton Athletic	2015–16	Championship	19	2	0	0	1	0	0	0	20	2
Charlton Athletic	2016–17	League One	2	0	0	0	0	0	3 (Note: Appearances in the Football League Trophy)	0	5	0
Charlton Athletic	2017–18	League One	10	0	1	0	0	0	1	0	12	0
Charlton Athletic	Total		33	2	2	0	1	0	4	0	40	2
Cambridge United (loan)	2014–15	League Two	2	0	0	0	0	0	1	0	3	0
Gillingham (loan)	2014–15	League One	2	0	0	0	0	0	0	0	2	0
Gillingham (loan)	2015–16	League One	6	2	0	0	0	0	2	0	8	2
Southend United	2018–19	League One	9	0	0	0	0	0	0	0	9	0
Southend United	2019–20	League One	16	1	1	0	2	0	1	0	20	1
Southend United	2020–21	League Two	9	0	1	0	0	0	0	0	10	0
Southend United	Total		34	1	2	0	2	0	1	0	39	1
Wrexham	2021–22	National League	17	2	1	0	0	0	1 (Note: Appearances in the FA Trophy)	0	19	2
Wrexham	2022–23	National League	1	0	1	0	0	0	2	0	4	0
Wrexham	Total		18	2	2	0	0	0	3	0	23	2
Career total			95	7	6	0	3	0	11	0	115	7
