= Luke Hyam =

English footballer

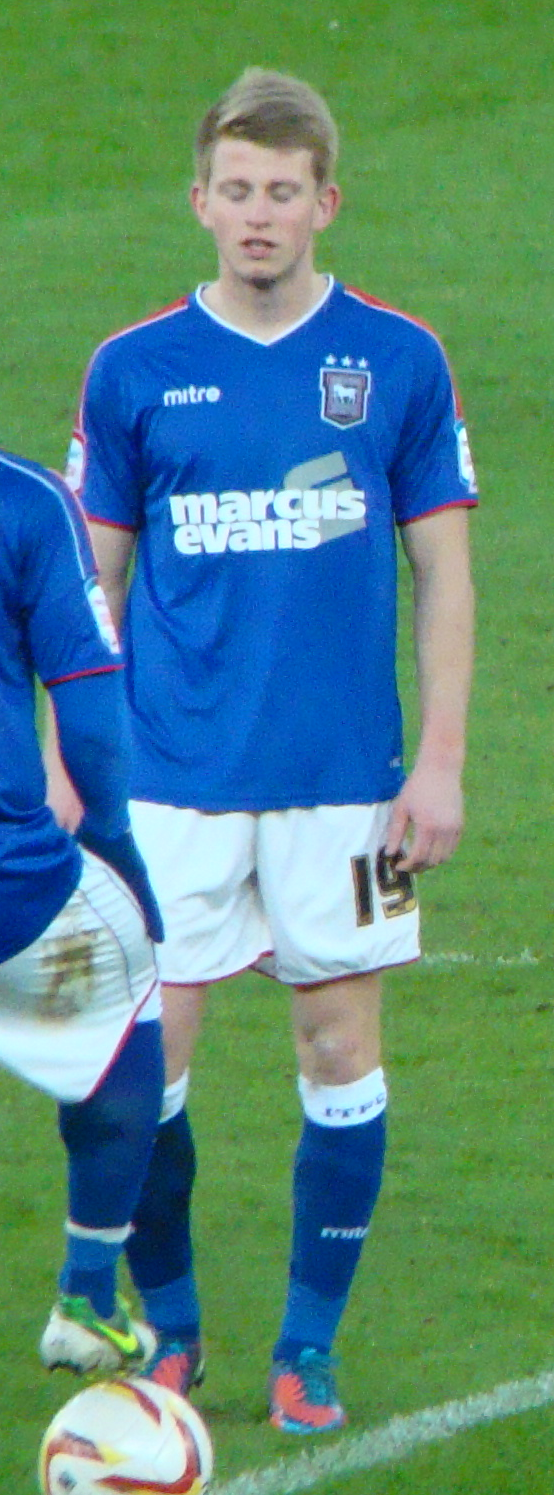
- Hyam playing for Ipswich Town in 2013

Personal information
- Full name: Luke Thomas Hyam
- Date of birth: 24 October 1991 (age 35)
- Place of birth: Ipswich, England
- Height: 1.78 m (5 ft 10 in)
- Position: Midfielder

Team information
- Current team: Woodbridge Town (manager)

Youth career
- 2003–2010: Ipswich Town

Senior career*
Years	Team	Apps	(Gls)
2010–2018	Ipswich Town	131	(3)
2015	→ Rotherham United (loan)	5	(0)
2018–2020	Southend United	23	(1)
Total		159	(4)

Managerial career
- 2022–2025: Woodbridge Town
- * Club domestic league appearances and goals

Luke Thomas Hyam (born 24 October 1991) is an English football manager and former professional player.

A product of Ipswich Town's academy, Hyam made his professional debut for the club in August 2010, going onto make 131 appearances for the club and scoring 4 goals. Hyam left Ipswich in May 2018, ending his 15-year association with the club. He subsequently joined Southend United on a free transfer in July 2018, spending two years at the club before being released in 2020. He announced his retirement from football in February 2021 aged 29, having failed to recover from a back injury. He became the manager of non-league side Woodbridge Town in May 2022.

== Club career ==
=== Ipswich Town ===
Born in Ipswich, Hyam came through the academy at Ipswich Town, having joined the club when he was a pupil at Northgate High School in the town. Having progressed through the ranks of the youth academy, Hyam was a regular member of the reserve team in 2009–10. Hyam made regular appearances during the pre-season of the 2010–11 season, notably against both West Ham United and PSV Eindhoven.

Hyam was handed his first team debut by manager Roy Keane in the 3–1 opening day win away at Middlesbrough on 7 August 2010. Following the sacking of Keane in January 2011, Paul Jewell was appointed as the new manager of Ipswich. It appeared very early on that Hyam would not get as much of a chance to play under Jewell as he did during Keane's time in charge, and was subsequently cast aside for the rest of the season. In April 2011, however, he was awarded a twelve-month contract extension by the club, indicating that Jewell was not yet giving up on him.

At the start of the 2011–12 season, Hyam again found his chances limited, despite having made a handful of appearances in pre-season. His first competitive appearance under Jewell came in the first round of the league cup, as Ipswich found themselves the victims of one of the round's biggest upsets, losing 2–1 to Northampton. He had to wait until January 2012 before he would finally be given a start in the league under Jewell. Having faced the wrath of the fans for not including enough of the club's young players, Jewell included Hyam in a very young starting eleven for the game against Blackpool, with an average age of just under 25. During the game Hyam was one of the star performers, earning praise from one of the senior players in the line-up, Andy Drury. He said:

Luke played really well and it was nice to play with him. They all played well and hopefully the boys who have done well will keep the shirt.

— Andy Drury,

He scored his first goal for the club on 27 November 2012, netting in a 3–1 home win over Nottingham Forest at Portman Road. Under Mick McCarthy, Hyam was a regular match day squad player, though his playing time for the second half of the 2014–15 season was reduced due to injuries. Hyam was due back for the start of the 2015–16 but picked up an injury during pre-season requiring surgery. He was due back before Christmas of the 2015–16 season.

==== Rotherham United (loan) ====
He joined Rotherham United on loan on 26 November 2015. He made his debut for the club two days later, featuring as a substitute in a 3–0 win over Bristol City. He was recalled back to Ipswich on 22 December 2015, after making 5 appearances.

==== Return to Ipswich ====
Hyam made his first appearance upon return to Ipswich as a second-half substitute in a 0–1 away win over Brighton & Hove Albion on 29 December 2015. He made a 17 appearances for Ipswich during the second half of the 2015–16 season.

He underwent surgery again in October 2016 for a knee injury. After missing the entire 2016–17 season due to injury, he made his first appearance of the 2017–18 season on 2 January 2018, featuring as a substitute in a 1–4 loss to Fulham. He made a total of 18 appearances over the course of the season. With his contract set to expire in the summer of 2018, on 7 May it was announced that Hyam would be leaving the club, ending a 15-year stay at Ipswich.

=== Southend United ===
On 2 July 2018, Hyam joined League One side Southend United on a free transfer. He signed a two-year deal, with the option of an additional 12 months, becoming Chris Powell's sixth signing of the 2018–19 season. He made his debut for the club on the opening day of the 2018–19 season in a 2–3 loss to Doncaster Rovers at Roots Hall. He scored his first goal for the club on 6 April 2019, in a 2–2 draw with Fleetwood Town. Hyam made a total of 22 appearances in all competitions during his first season at Southend, scoring once. After making just five appearances during the following season, mainly due to continuing injury problems, Southend announced that Hyam would be released following the end of his contract in June 2020.

=== Retirement ===
Hyam announced his retirement from professional football in February 2021 aged 29, having failed to recover from a back injury sustained during his final season at Southend. In an interview posted on the Ipswich Town website the same day, Hyam also spoke of his struggles with mental health in the past and outlined his intention of becoming a personal trainer to help others deal with similar physical and mental health problems.

== Managerial career ==
=== Woodbridge Town ===
On 7 February 2022, Hyam began his management career when he was appointed as manager of local non-league side Woodbridge Town. He signed a contract that would see him begin work at the side at the end of the 2021–22 season.

== Career statistics ==
As of match played 2 November 2019

Appearances and goals by club, season and competition
Club	Season	League			FA Cup		League Cup		Other		Total	
Club	Season	Division	Apps	Goals	Apps	Goals	Apps	Goals	Apps	Goals	Apps	Goals
Ipswich Town	2010–11	Championship	10	0	0	0	3	0	—		13	0
Ipswich Town	2011–12	Championship	8	0	1	0	1	0	—		10	0
Ipswich Town	2012–13	Championship	30	1	1	0	1	0	—		32	1
Ipswich Town	2013–14	Championship	35	1	2	0	1	0	—		38	1
Ipswich Town	2014–15	Championship	16	1	2	0	0	0	0	0	18	1
Ipswich Town	2015–16	Championship	15	0	2	0	0	0	—		17	0
Ipswich Town	2016–17	Championship	0	0	0	0	0	0	—		0	0
Ipswich Town	2017–18	Championship	17	0	1	0	0	0	—		18	0
Ipswich Town	Total		131	3	9	0	6	0	0	0	146	3
Rotherham United (loan)	2015–16	Championship	5	0	0	0	0	0	0	0	5	0
Southend United	2018–19	League One	18	1	1	0	0	0	3 (Note: Appearance(s) in EFL Trophy)	0	22	1
Southend United	2019–20	League One	5	0	0	0	0	0	1	0	6	0
Southend United	Total		23	1	1	0	0	0	4	0	28	1
Career total			159	4	10	0	6	0	4	0	179	4
