= Sam Mantom =

English footballer (born 1992)

Personal information
- Full name: Samuel Stephen Mantom
- Date of birth: 20 February 1992 (age 34)
- Place of birth: Stourbridge, England
- Height: 5 ft 9 in (1.75 m)
- Position: Midfielder

Team information
- Current team: Rushall Olympic (player-coach)

Youth career
- Walsall
- –2010: West Bromwich Albion

Senior career*
Years	Team	Apps	(Gls)
2010–2013	West Bromwich Albion	0	(0)
2010	→ Haukar (loan)	7	(2)
2011	→ Tranmere Rovers (loan)	2	(0)
2011	→ Oldham Athletic (loan)	4	(0)
2012	→ Walsall (loan)	13	(3)
2012–2013	→ Walsall (loan)	11	(1)
2013–2016	Walsall	110	(14)
2016–2018	Scunthorpe United	34	(2)
2018	→ Southend United (loan)	7	(0)
2018–2020	Southend United	65	(7)
2020	Rushall Olympic	3	(1)
2020–2022	Hemel Hempstead Town	33	(2)
2022–	Rushall Olympic	54	(19)

International career^{‡}
2008	England U17	2	(0)
- * Club domestic league appearances and goals as of 13:37, 27 June 2022 (UTC) ‡ National team caps and goals as of 18:45, 24 May 2011 (UTC)

Samuel Stephen Mantom (born 20 February 1992) is an English footballer who plays as a midfielder for Rushall Olympic where he holds the role of player-coach.

== Club career ==
=== West Bromwich Albion ===
Mantom began his career as a youth player for Walsall's academy before being spotted by West Bromwich Albion. The Baggies reportedly paid £20,000 to bring him to The Hawthorns.

After regularly appearing for the Baggies' reserve side, Mantom was handed a professional deal by the club. He joined Icelandic side Haukar on 14 May 2010. Mantom made seven appearances for the newly promoted Úrvalsdeild side, scoring twice.

He made his debut for West Brom in the Football League Cup game against Leyton Orient at Brisbane Road on 24 August 2010, which ended in a 2–0 win for the Baggies.

On 23 November 2010 he joined Tranmere Rovers on a month–long emergency loan. Mantom made his debut on the same day in a 1–0 defeat against Hartlepool United.

On 17 February 2011 he joined Oldham Athletic on a month–long emergency loan. On 19 February 2011, Mantom made his debut for the Latics in a 1–0 defeat against Bristol Rovers. Mantom made four goalless appearances before returning to his parent club.

=== Walsall ===
On 6 March 2012, Mantom signed for Football League One side Walsall on loan. Mantom scored on his debut for the Saddlers on the same day in a 3–2 victory over Sheffield United. On 17 March 2012, Mantom scored his second goal for the club in a 2–1 defeat against Yeovil Town. Mantom netted the winning goal in a 3–2 win against Chestefield on 7 April 2012 as the Saddlers narrowly avoided relegation.

Mantom returned to Walsall on loan on 9 November 2012. He scored his first goal of his second loan spell in a 2–1 defeat against Leyton Orient on 29 December 2012.

On 11 January 2013, Mantom made his loan move to Walsall permanent, joining on a free transfer after West Brom agreed to cancel his contract with the club. Mantom signed an 18-month contract with the Saddlers. Mantom scored his second goal of the season in a 3–1 victory over Bournemouth on 19 January 2013. Despite a strong second half of the season that lifted Walsall into play-off contention, the Saddlers eventually finished ninth in League One.

Mantom scored his first goal of the 2013–14 season on 21 September 2013 in a 1–1 draw against Rotherham United. He netted his second goal of the season on 22 October 2013 as the Saddlers beat Swindon at the County Ground. Mantom signed a new two–and–a–half–year deal with the club on 15 November 2013. He then scored the only goal of the game in a 1–0 victory over former club Oldham on 14 January 2014 . He netted his fourth goal of the season on 22 February 2014 against Crawley as the Saddlers slipped to a 2–1 defeat. Mantom scored his fifth goal of the season and was sent off for the first time in his professional career in his next game as Walsall lost 2–1 at Preston North End on 1 March 2014. Mantom was rewarded for an impressive campaign at the end of the season by being named the Saddlers' Player of the Year.

Mantom suffered a knee injury during pre–season training and was sidelined for several of the opening weeks of the 2014–15 season. He eventually made his first appearance of the season as a late substitute in Walsall's 1–0 defeat against Crawley on 21 October 2014. However, a recurrence of Mantom's original injury saw him undergo knee surgery in January 2015.

=== Scunthorpe United ===
In June 2016, he signed for League One side Scunthorpe United on a free transfer signing a three-year contract, after turning down a new deal at Walsall. He scored his first goal for Scunthorpe against Chesterfield on 22 October 2016.

=== Southend United ===
In June 2018, Mantom signed for League One side Southend United for an undisclosed fee.

=== Rushall Olympic ===
Mantom signed for Southern League Premier Division Central side Rushall Olympic on 16 October 2020.

=== Hemel Hempstead ===
Mantom signed for National League South side Hemel Hempstead Town on 27 November 2020.

=== Rushall Olympic return ===
In June 2022, Mantom returned to Rushall Olympic.

In December 2024, following the sacking of manager Adam Stevens, Mantom became player-coach on an interim basis. Following the permanent appointment of interim manager Richard Sneekes, he stayed on in the role on a permanent basis.

== International career ==
Mantom is a former England under-17 international.

== Career statistics ==
As of match played 18 January 2025

Appearances and goals by club, season and competition
Club	Season	League			National Cup		League Cup		Other		Total	
Club	Season	Division	Apps	Goals	Apps	Goals	Apps	Goals	Apps	Goals	Apps	Goals
West Bromwich Albion	2010–11	Premier League	0	0	0	0	2	0	—		2	0
West Bromwich Albion	2011–12	Premier League	0	0	0	0	1	0	—		1	0
West Bromwich Albion	Total		0	0	0	0	3	0	—		3	0
Haukar (loan)	2010	Úrvalsdeild	7	2	—		—		—		7	2
Tranmere Rovers (loan)	2010–11	League One	2	0	—		—		0	0	2	0
Oldham Athletic (loan)	2010–11	League One	4	0	—		—		—		4	0
Walsall (loan)	2011–12	League One	13	3	—		—		—		13	3
Walsall (loan)	2012–13	League One	11	1	—		—		—		11	1
Walsall	2012–13	League One	18	1	—		—		—		18	1
Walsall	2013–14	League One	43	5	2	0	2	0	1 (Note: Appearance(s) in Football League/EFL Trophy)	0	48	5
Walsall	2014–15	League One	12	0	1	0	0	0	2	0	15	0
Walsall	2015–16	League One	37	8	4	1	3	0	3 (Note: One appearance in Football League Trophy and two appearances in League One play-offs)	0	47	9
Walsall	Total		134	18	7	1	5	0	6	0	152	19
Scunthorpe United	2016–17	League One	26	2	1	0	1	0	6 (Note: Five appearances in EFL Trophy and one in the League One play-offs)	1	34	3
Scunthorpe United	2017–18	League One	8	0	0	0	2	0	2	0	12	0
Scunthorpe United	Total		34	2	1	0	3	0	8	1	41	3
Southend United (loan)	2017–18	League One	7	0	—		—		—		7	0
Southend United	2018–19	League One	43	5	3	2	1	0	1	0	48	7
Southend United	2019–20	League One	22	2	0	0	2	0	2	0	26	2
Southend United	Total		72	7	3	2	3	0	3	0	81	9
Rushall Olympic	2020–21	Southern League; Premier Central	3	1	—		—		0	0	3	1
Hemel Hempstead Town	2020–21	National League South	8	0	—		—		2 (Note: Appearance/s in FA Trophy)	0	10	0
Hemel Hempstead Town	2021–22	National League South	25	2	0	0	—		1	0	26	2
Hemel Hempstead Town	Total		33	2	0	0	—		3	0	36	2
Rushall Olympic	2022–23	Southern League; Premier Central	36	14	1	0	—		6 (Note: One appearance in FA Trophy, two appearances and three goals in Staffordshire Senior Cup and two appearances and one goal in Walsall Senior Cup)	4	43	18
Rushall Olympic	2023–24	National League North	11	4	0	0	—		0	0	11	4
Rushall Olympic	2024–25	National League North	7	1	1	0	—		0	0	8	1
Rushall Olympic	Total		57	20	1	0	—		6	4	64	24
Career total			343	51	13	3	14	0	26	6	396	59

== Honours ==
Walsall

- Football League Trophy runner-up: 2014–15

Rushall

- Southern League Premier Central play-offs: 2022–23
- Staffordshire Senior Cup: 2022–23, 2023–24
- Walsall Senior Cup: 2022–23, 2023–24

Individual

- Walsall Supporters' Player of the Year: 2013–14
- Rushall Olympic Supporters' Player of the Year: 2022–23
- Rushall Olympic Players' Player of the Year: 2022–23
