= Michael Klass =

English footballer

Personal information
- Full name: Michael Anthony Klass
- Date of birth: 9 February 1999 (age 27)
- Place of birth: Hammersmith, England
- Height: 1.75 m (5 ft 9 in)
- Position: Midfielder

Team information
- Current team: Farnborough
- Number: 28

Youth career
- Fulham
- Queens Park Rangers
- –2017: Southend United

Senior career*
Years	Team	Apps	(Gls)
2017–2021	Southend United	12	(0)
2019–2020	→ Bromley (loan)	17	(0)
2021–2022	Lewes	39	(5)
2022–2023	Aldershot Town	27	(0)
2022	→ Lewes (loan)	3	(0)
2023–2024	Worthing	25	(0)
2024	Maidstone United	3	(0)
2024–2025	Eastbourne Borough	34	(3)
2025	Bracknell Town	5	(1)
2025–	Farnborough	13	(0)
2025	→ Bedfont Sports (dual-registration)	1	(0)
2025	→ Sholing (dual-registration)	3	(1)
- * Club domestic league appearances and goals as of 13:14, 20 April 2026 (UTC)

Michael Anthony Klass (born 9 February 1999) is an English professional footballer who plays as a midfielder for National League South club Farnborough.

== Club career ==
Klass joined Southend United in July 2017, following his release from Queens Park Rangers. He went onto make his first-team debut during their EFL Trophy tie against Gillingham, replacing Dru Yearwood in the 2–1 defeat. On 2 August 2019, Klass joined National League side Bromley on a one month loan, which was later extended until January 2020.

He was released by Southend in the summer of 2021 and he subsequently joined Isthmian League Premier Division side Lewes on a free transfer.

On 29 July 2022, Klass made the step back up to the National League to join Aldershot Town having spent pre-season with the club on trial. On 24 September 2022, Klass returned to Lewes on loan. He was released by Aldershot after one season.

In June 2023, Klass signed for National League South club Worthing. He joined league rivals Maidstone United in March 2024.

Following spells with Eastbourne Borough and Bracknell Town, Klass joined Farnborough in November 2025. He then dual-registered with Bedfont Sports and then Sholing that same month in order to gain match fitness.

== Career statistics ==
As of 18 April 2026

Appearances and goals by club, season and competition
Club	Season	League			FA Cup		EFL Cup		Other		Total	
Club	Season	Division	Apps	Goals	Apps	Goals	Apps	Goals	Apps	Goals	Apps	Goals
Southend United	2017–18	League One	0	0	0	0	0	0	2 (Note: Appearance(s) in Football League Trophy)	0	2	0
Southend United	2018–19	League One	10	0	0	0	1	0	2	0	13	0
Southend United	2019–20	League One	0	0	―		0	0	0	0	0	0
Southend United	2020–21	League Two	2	0	0	0	0	0	0	0	2	0
Southend United	Total		12	0	0	0	1	0	4	0	17	0
Bromley (loan)	2019–20	National League	17	0	1	0	―		1 (Note: Appearance(s) in FA Trophy)	0	19	0
Lewes	2021–22	Isthmian League Premier Division	39	5	1	0	—		2 (Note: One appearance in FA Trophy and one appearance in Sussex Senior Cup)	0	42	5
Aldershot Town	2022–23	National League	27	0	0	0	—		1	0	28	0
Lewes (loan)	2022–23	Isthmian League Premier Division	3	0	0	0	—		―		3	0
Worthing	2023–24	National League South	25	0	3	0	—		2	0	30	0
Maidstone United	2023–24	National League South	3	0	—		—		2 (Note: Appearance(s) in National League South play-offs)	0	5	0
Eastbourne Borough	2024–25	National League South	34	3	1	0	—		6 (Note: One appearance in National League South play-offs, one appearance in FA Trophy, four appearances in Sussex Senior Cup)	0	41	3
Bracknell Town	2025–26	Southern League Premier Division South	5	1	2	0	—		0	0	7	1
Farnborough	2025–26	National League South	13	0	—		—		1	0	14	0
Bedfont Sports (dual-registration)	2025–26	Isthmian League South Central Division	1	0	—		—		—		1	0
Sholing (dual-registration)	2025–26	Southern League Premier Division South	3	1	—		—		—		3	1
Career total			182	10	8	0	1	0	19	0	210	10
