= Elvis Bwomono =

Ugandan footballer (born 1998)

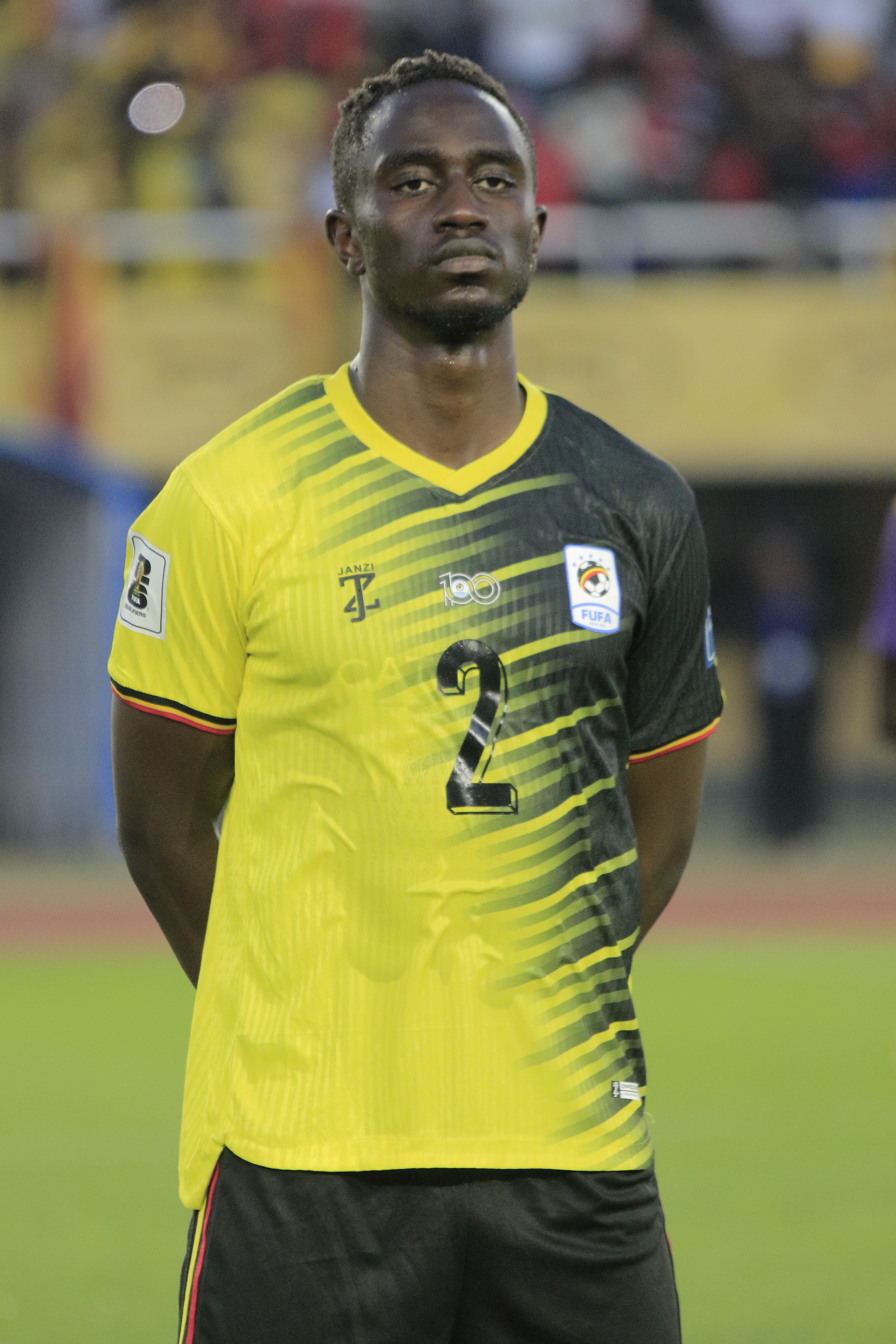
- Elvis_Bwomono with Uganda cranes

Personal information
- Full name: Elvis Okello Bwomono
- Date of birth: 29 November 1998 (age 27)
- Place of birth: Kampala, Uganda
- Height: 1.85 m (6 ft 1 in)
- Position: Full-back

Team information
- Current team: Keflavik
- Number: 2

Youth career
- Queens Park Rangers
- 2012–2017: Southend United

Senior career*
Years	Team	Apps	(Gls)
2017–2021	Southend United	116	(2)
2022–2023	ÍBV	44	(0)
2023–2025	St Mirren	38	(0)
2025	ÍBV	10	(1)
2026	Aberdeen	3	(0)
2026	Keflavík	6	(1)

International career^{‡}
2020–	Uganda	14	(0)
- * Club domestic league appearances and goals as of 16 November 2026 ‡ National team caps and goals as of 2 November 2025

Elvis Okello Bwomono (born 29 November 1998) is an Ugandan professional footballer who plays as a full-back. He plays for Keflavik in Iceland after signing for them in August 2026

== Club career ==
=== Youth and Southend United ===
Bwomono was born in Uganda and lived there until the age of three. Bwomomo later moved to London where he attended Hatch End High School. He started his career as a youth player at Queens Park Rangers, and he later joined Southend United as a 14-year old.

He made his debut for Southend in a 2–1 defeat to Gillingham in the 2017–18 EFL Trophy Southern Section Group B fixture on 29 August 2017. In October 2017, he signed his first professional contract with the club.

Following relegation, Bwomono rejected a new contract and refused to play for the club. He subsequently left Southend United.

=== ÍBV ===
In May 2022, Bwomono joined Icelandic Besta-deild karla side ÍBV.

=== St Mirren ===
Bwomono signed a short-term contract with Scottish Premiership club St Mirren in December 2023.

=== Return to ÍBV ===
In July 2025, Bwomono returned to ÍBV following their promotion back to the Besta-deild karla.

=== Aberdeen ===
On 27 March 2026, Bwomono returned to the Scottish Premiership, joining Aberdeen on a short-term deal until the end of the season.

=== Keflavík ===
In August 2026, it was announced that Elvis had signed for Keflavik in Iceland until 2028.

== International career ==
Bwomono made his international debut for Uganda in November 2020 against South Sudan.

== Career statistics ==
=== Club ===
As of match played 8 May 2021

Appearances and goals by club, season and competition
Club	Season	League			FA Cup		EFL Cup		Other		Total	
Club	Season	Division	Apps	Goals	Apps	Goals	Apps	Goals	Apps	Goals	Apps	Goals
Southend United	2017–18	League One	11	0	0	0	0	0	3 (Note: Appearances in EFL Trophy)	0	14	0
Southend United	2018–19	League One	30	0	1	0	0	0	5	1	36	1
Southend United	2019–20	League One	34	1	1	0	2	0	2	0	39	1
Southend United	2020–21	League Two	41	1	1	0	1	0	1	0	44	1
			116	2	3	0	3	0	11	1	133	3
ÍBV men's football		Besta-deild karla	19	0	1	0	0	0	0	0	20	0
ÍBV men's football		Besta-deild karla	25	0	1	0	2	0	0	0	28	0
			44	0	1	0	2	0	0	0	48	0
St Mirren F.C.	2023–24	Scottish Premiership	1	0	1	0	0	0	0	0	2	0
Career total			116	2	4	0	5	0	11	1	183	3

=== International ===
As of match played 16 November 2020

Appearances and goals by national team and year
National team	Year	Apps	Goals
Uganda	2020	2	0
Total		2	0
