= 2018–19 Southend United F.C. season =

Southend United
2018–19 season
- Chairman: Ron Martin
- Manager: Chris Powell (until 26 March); Kevin Bond (from 2 April)
- Stadium: Roots Hall
- League One: 19th
- FA Cup: Second round
- EFL Cup: First round
- EFL Trophy: Third round
- Top goalscorer: League: Simon Cox (15); All: Simon Cox (17)
- Highest home attendance: League/All: 10,779 (4 May 2019 vs. Sunderland)
- Lowest home attendance: League: 5,110 (27 Nov 2018 vs. Scunthorpe United); All: 983 (14 Nov 2018 vs. Southampton U21, EFL Trophy)
- Average home league attendance: 6,932
- Biggest win: +4 goals (twice) (6–2, 20 Nov 2018 at Crawley Town) (4–0, 12 Jan 2019 at Bradford City)
- Biggest defeat: -3 goals (4 times) (0–3, 27 Oct 2018 at Sunderland) (0–3, 12 Feb 2019 at Doncaster Rovers) (0–3, 2 Mar 2019 vs. Barnsley) (1–4, 12 Mar 2019 at Scunthorpe United)
Home colours	Away colours	Third colours

The 2018–19 season was Southend United's 113th year in existence and their fourth consecutive season in League One. Along with competing in League One, the club participated in the FA Cup, EFL Cup and EFL Trophy.

The season covers the period from 1 July 2018 to 30 June 2019.

== Competitions ==
=== Friendlies ===
Pre-season friendlies with Great Wakering Rovers and Leyton Orient were announced on 21 May 2018.

21 July 2018	Southend United	1–1	Leeds United	Southend-on-Sea
14:00 BST	Lennon 20'	Report	Ayling 34'	Stadium: Roots Hall; Attendance: 3,815

24 July 2018	Leyton Orient	2–2	Southend United	Leyton
19:45 BST	Bonne 50' (pen.); Alabi 77'	Report	Dimitriou 15'; Hopper 63'	Stadium: Brisbane Road; Attendance: 1,542

=== League One ===
==== League table ====
Pos	Team	Pld	W	D	L	GF	GA	GD	Pts	Promotion, qualification or relegation
17	Wycombe Wanderers	46	14	11	21	55	67	−12	53	
18	Shrewsbury Town	46	12	16	18	51	59	−8	52	
19	Southend United	46	14	8	24	55	68	−13	50	
20	AFC Wimbledon	46	13	11	22	42	63	−21	50	
21	Plymouth Argyle (R)	46	13	11	22	56	80	−24	50	Relegation to EFL League Two

Source: EFL Official Website
Rules for classification: 1) Points; 2) Goal difference; 3) Number of goals scored; 4) Head-to-head results
(R) Relegated

==== Results summary ====
Overall								Home						Away					
Pld	W	D	L	GF	GA	GD	Pts	W	D	L	GF	GA	GD	W	D	L	GF	GA	GD
46	14	8	24	55	68	−13	50	8	2	13	32	34	−2	6	6	11	23	34	−11

Last updated: 4 May 2019.
Source: BBC

==== Results by matchday ====
Round	1	2	3	4	5	6	7	8	9	10	11	12	13	14	15	16	17	18	19	20	21	22	23	24	25	26	27	28	29	30	31	32	33	34	35	36	37	38	39	40	41	42	43	44	45	46
Ground	H	A	H	A	A	H	H	A	H	A	A	H	A	H	H	A	A	H	A	H	A	H	H	A	A	H	H	A	H	H	A	A	H	A	H	A	A	H	A	H	A	H	A	H	A	H
Result	L	D	W	L	W	L	L	L	W	W	W	D	W	L	W	L	L	L	L	W	L	W	L	W	L	W	L	W	L	L	D	L	D	D	L	D	L	L	L	L	D	L	D	W	L	W
Position	14	15	8	13	11	13	15	18	16	13	11	11	9	12	9	11	12	14	15	14	15	12	13	11	12	9	12	11	12	12	14	14	14	13	13	14	18	20	20	20	20	22	22	19	20	19

Updated to match(es) played on 4 May 2019. Source:
A = Away; H = Home; W = Win; D = Draw; L = Loss

==== Matches ====
On 21 June 2018, the League One fixtures for the forthcoming season were announced.

4 August 2018 1	Southend United	2–3	Doncaster Rovers	Southend-on-Sea
15:00 BST	Turner (yellow card) 35'; Hopper 75' (yellow card) 90+10'; Robinson 86'	Report	Butler (yellow card) 29'; Marquis 51'; Mason (yellow card) 57'; Wilks 58' (yellow card) 90+1'; Rowe 70' (yellow card) 90+5'; Kiwomya (yellow card) 90+7'	Stadium: Roots Hall; Attendance: 7,147; Referee: Craig Hicks

11 August 2018 2	Plymouth Argyle	1–1	Southend United	Plymouth
15:00 BST	Carey 20' (pen.)	Report	Demetriou 38' (pen.)	Stadium: Home Park; Attendance: 9,886; Referee: John Busby

18 August 2018 3	Southend United	2–0	Bradford City	Southend-on-Sea
15:00 BST	Hopper 52'; Cox 56'	Report		Stadium: Roots Hall; Attendance: 6,295; Referee: Tom Nield

21 August 2018 4	Luton Town	2–0	Southend United	Luton
19:45 BST	Lee 2'; Hylton 33' (pen.)	Report		Stadium: Kenilworth Road; Attendance: 9,086; Referee: Trevor Kettle

25 August 2018 5	Bristol Rovers	0–1	Southend United	Horfield
15:00 BST		Report	Hopper 40'	Stadium: The Memorial Stadium; Attendance: 8,172; Referee: Ross Joyce

1 September 2018 6	Southend United	1–2	Charlton Athletic	Southend-on-Sea
15:00 BST	Robinson 60'; Kightly (red card) 90+5'; Oxley (red card) 90+5'	Report	Taylor 57'; Bielik 87'; Fosu (red card) 90+4'	Stadium: Roots Hall; Attendance: 7,923; Referee: Brett Huxtable

8 September 2018 7	Southend United	2–3	Peterborough United	Southend-on-Sea
15:00 BST	Hopper 63'; McLaughlin 75'	Report	Godden 32', 57'; Toney 87'	Stadium: Roots Hall; Attendance: 6,551; Referee: Kevin Johnson

15 September 2018 8	Shrewsbury Town	2–0	Southend United	Shrewsbury
15:00 BST	Docherty 5'; Angol 45+2'	Report		Stadium: New Meadow; Attendance: 5,651; Referee: Chris Sarginson

22 September 2018 9	Southend United	1–0	Fleetwood Town	Southend-on-Sea
15:00 BST	Cox 53'	Report	Wallace (red card) 90+5'	Stadium: Roots Hall; Attendance: 5,712; Referee: Charles Breakspear

29 September 2018 10	Wycombe Wanderers	2–3	Southend United	High Wycombe
15:00 BST	Mackail-Smith 83'; Akinfenwa 86'	Report	Robinson 38'; Hopper 53'; Cox 57'	Stadium: Adams Park; Attendance: 4,784; Referee: Tom Nield

2 October 2018 11	Burton Albion	1–2	Southend United	Burton upon Trent
19:45 BST	Boyce 21'	Report	Hopper 61'; Cox 78'	Stadium: Pirelli Stadium; Attendance: 2,149; Referee: Seb Stockbridge

6 October 2018 12	Southend United	0–0	Oxford United	Southend-on-Sea
15:00 BST		Report		Stadium: Roots Hall; Attendance: 6,670; Referee: Craig Hicks

13 October 2018 13	Gillingham	0–2	Southend United	Gillingham
15:00 BST		Report	Cox 51', 53'	Stadium: Priestfield Stadium; Attendance: 5,584; Referee: John Busby

20 October 2018 14	Southend United	1–2	Coventry City	Southend-on-Sea
15:00 BST	Coker (yellow card) 22'; Hopper 68'; Cox (yellow card) 73' (yellow-red card) 79'	Report	Doyle (yellow card) 8'; Hiwula 20'; Davies (yellow card) 56'; Jones 90+1' (yellow card) 90+3'	Stadium: Roots Hall; Attendance: 7,775; Referee: Dean Whitestone

23 October 2018 15	Southend United	3–0	Walsall	Southend-on-Sea
19:45 BST	Bunn 23', 82'; Dieng 76'	Report		Stadium: Roots Hall; Attendance: 5,603; Referee: Alan Young

27 October 2018 16	Sunderland	3–0	Southend United	Sunderland
15:00 BST	Honeyman 29'; Flanagan (yellow card) 45+4'; Maguire 53'; McGeady 80'	Report	Bunn (yellow card) 41'; Yearwood (yellow card) 68'	Stadium: Stadium of Light; Attendance: 30,894; Referee: Robert Lewis

3 November 2018 17	Barnsley	1–0	Southend United	Barnsley
15:00 GMT	Moore 87'	Report		Stadium: Oakwell; Attendance: 10,709; Referee: Brett Huxtable

17 November 2018 18	Southend United	1–2	Blackpool	Southend-on-Sea
15:00 GMT	Demetriou 74'; Turner (red card) 86'	Report	Turton 14'; Gnanduillet 83'	Stadium: Roots Hall; Attendance: 6,882; Referee: Nick Kinseley

24 November 2018 19	AFC Wimbledon	2–1	Southend United	Kingston upon Thames
15:00 GMT	Oshilaja 45+1'; Pinnock 70'	Report	Trotter 11' (o.g.)	Stadium: Kingsmeadow; Attendance: 4,195; Referee: Steve Martin

27 November 2018 20	Southend United	2–0	Scunthorpe United	Southend-on-Sea
19:45 GMT	Dieng 8'; Mantom 80'	Report	Perch (red card) 38'	Stadium: Roots Hall; Attendance: 5,110; Referee: Trevor Kettle

8 December 2018 21	Portsmouth	2–0	Southend United	Portsmouth
15:00 GMT	Turner 11' (o.g.); Lowe 29'	Report		Stadium: Fratton Park; Attendance: 18,062; Referee: Lee Collins

15 December 2018 22	Southend United	3–0	Accrington Stanley	Southend-on-Sea
15:00 GMT	Mantom 19'; Cox 23'; Robinson 72'	Report	Ihiekwe (yellow card) 51'; Finley (yellow card) 63'	Stadium: Roots Hall; Attendance: 6,286; Referee: Antony Coggins

22 December 2018 23	Southend United	1–2	Rochdale	Southend-on-Sea
15:00 GMT	White 81'; Dieng (yellow card) 90+2'	Report	Rathbone (yellow card) 5'; Williams 23'; Camps (yellow card) 51' (goal) 87'	Stadium: Roots Hall; Attendance: 5,735; Referee: Neil Hair

26 December 2018 24	Oxford United	0–1	Southend United	Oxford
15:00 GMT	Dickie (yellow card) 45'; Mackie (yellow card) 87'	Report	Bwomono (yellow card) 73'; Kightly 79'; Hyam (yellow card) 90+1'; Cox (yellow card) 90+7'	Stadium: Kassam Stadium; Attendance: 8,978; Referee: Tim Robinson

29 December 2018 25	Coventry City	1–0	Southend United	Coventry
15:00 GMT	Hiwula 54'; Chaplin (yellow card) 90+9'	Report	Kightly (yellow card) 48'; Dieng (yellow card) 50'; McLaughlin (yellow card) 90+8'	Stadium: Ricoh Arena; Attendance: 11,395; Referee: Kevin Johnson

1 January 2019 26	Southend United	2–0	Gillingham	Southend-on-Sea
15:00 GMT	Mantom 40'; Bwomono (yellow card) 74'; Robinson (yellow card) 90' (yellow-red card) 90+3'; Moore 90+5'	Report	Bingham (yellow card) 39'; Lacey (yellow card) 90+5'	Stadium: Roots Hall; Attendance: 7,903; Referee: Keith Stroud

12 January 2019 27	Southend United	2–3	Plymouth Argyle	Southend-on-Sea
15:00 GMT	Cox (yellow card) 55' (goal) 86' (pen.); Hendrie (yellow card) 55'; Dieng (yellow card) 61'; Kelman 90+2'	Report	Sarcevic 21' (yellow card) 54'; Ladapo 49'; Fox (yellow card) 62'; Lameiras 73'; Carey (yellow card) 87'	Stadium: Roots Hall; Attendance: 6,851; Referee: Graham Salisbury

12 January 2019 28	Bradford City	0–4	Southend United	Bradford
15:00 GMT	Doyle (yellow card) 37'	Report	Cox 2'; Mantom 26', (yellow card) 30'; Hart (yellow card) 29'; Humphrys 54', 73'	Stadium: Valley Parade; Attendance: 15,517; Referee: Michael Salisbury

26 January 2019 29	Southend United	0–1	Luton Town	Southend-on-Sea
15:00 GMT	Yearwood (yellow card) 28'; Hart (yellow card) 65'	Report	Pearson 29'; Stacey (yellow card) 90+3'; McCormack (yellow card) 90+4'	Stadium: Roots Hall; Attendance: 8,460; Referee: Thomas Bramall

2 February 2019 30	Southend United	1–2	Bristol Rovers	Southend-on-Sea
15:00 GMT	Turner (yellow card) 34'; Cox 39'; Hart (yellow card) 58'; Yearwood (yellow card) 62'	Report	Sercombe 20'; Reilly 32'; Nichols (yellow card) 45+2'; Clarke (yellow card) 74'; Partington (yellow card) 85'; Clarke-Harris (yellow card) 90+1'	Stadium: Roots Hall; Attendance: 5,982; Referee: Oliver Yates

9 February 2019 31	Charlton Athletic	1–1	Southend United	Charlton
15:00 GMT	Reeves (yellow card) 41' (goal) 59'; Cullen (yellow card) 53'; Bielik (yellow card) 82'	Report	Humphrys 22'; Yearwood (red card) 27'; Dieng (yellow card) 32'; Kightly (yellow card) 43'	Stadium: The Valley; Attendance: 12,389; Referee: Simon Hooper

12 February 2019 32	Doncaster Rovers	3–0	Southend United	Doncaster
19:45 GMT	Marquis 14'; Lewis (yellow card) 26'; Wilks 55'; Kane 73'	Report		Stadium: Keepmoat Stadium; Attendance: 6,557; Referee: Anthony Backhouse

16 February 2019 33	Southend United	3–3	Portsmouth	Southend-on-Sea
12:30 GMT	Cox 36', 78' (pen.), 87'; Klass (yellow card) 83'; Moore (yellow card) 90+3'	Report	Morris 8'; Close 20'; Hawkins 31'; Walkes (yellow card) 90+3'; Vaughan (yellow card) 90+3'	Stadium: Roots Hall; Attendance: 7,300; Referee: Dean Whitestone

23 February 2019 34	Accrington Stanley	1–1	Southend United	Accrington
15:00 GMT	Kee (yellow card) 30'; Barlaser 60'; Clark (yellow card) 79'	Report	Humphrys 20'; Cox (yellow card) 36'; Klass (yellow card) 41'	Stadium: Crown Ground; Attendance: 2,472; Referee: Eddie Ilderton

2 March 2019 35	Southend United	0–3	Barnsley	Southend-on-Sea
15:00 GMT		Report	Brown (red card) 35'; McGeehan 50'; Lindsay (yellow card) 57'; Woodrow 73'; Green 90+3'	Stadium: Roots Hall; Attendance: 6,217; Referee: Kevin Johnson

9 March 2019 36	Blackpool	2–2	Southend United	Blackpool
15:00 GMT	Gnanduillet 27'; Long (yellow card) 76'; Moore 90+6' (o.g.)	Report	Kiernan 20'; Cox (yellow card) 36'; Turner 48'; Hyam (yellow card) 65'; Demetriou (yellow card) 66'	Stadium: Bloomfield Road; Attendance: 15,871; Referee: Christopher Sarginson

12 March 2019 37	Scunthorpe United	4–1	Southend United	Scunthorpe
19:45 GMT	Pearce 23'; Lewis (yellow card) 65'; McMahon 68' van Veen (yellow card) 71'; Thomas 73'; Perch 77'	Report	Cox 3'; Demetriou (yellow card) 66'	Stadium: Glanford Park; Attendance: 3,233; Referee: Ben Toner

16 March 2019 38	Southend United	0–1	AFC Wimbledon	Southend-on-Sea
15:00 GMT	Hart (yellow card) 79'	Report	Wordsworth (yellow card) 52'; Pigott 67'	Stadium: Roots Hall; Attendance: 7,570; Referee: Brett Huxtable

23 March 2019 39	Peterborough United	2–0	Southend United	Peterborough
15:00 GMT	Maddison 41'; White 58'; Toney (yellow card) 81'	Report	Dieng (yellow card) 45+1'	Stadium: London Road Stadium; Attendance: 7,585; Referee: Alan Young

30 March 2019 40	Southend United	0–2	Shrewsbury Town	Southend-on-Sea
15:00 GMT	Hyam (yellow card) 78'	Report	Okenabirhie 50'; Williams (yellow card) 54'; Waterfall 69'; Whalley (yellow card) 77'	Stadium: Roots Hall; Attendance: 6,818; Referee: Michael Salisbury

6 April 2019 41	Fleetwood Town	2–2	Southend United	Fleetwood
15:00 BST	Souttar (yellow card) 38'; Burns (yellow card) 55'; Evans 59', 84' (pen.); Hunter (yellow card) 80'	Report	Bunn 21'; Hyam (yellow card) 78' (goal) 80'; White (yellow card) 90+3'	Stadium: Highbury Stadium; Attendance: 2,761; Referee: Peter Wright

13 April 2019 42	Southend United	0–2	Wycombe Wanderers	Southend-on-Sea
15:00 BST	Kightly (yellow card) 43'	Report	Kashket (yellow card) 47'; Akinfenwa (yellow card) 67' (goal) 69', 72'	Stadium: Roots Hall; Attendance: 7,689; Referee: David Coote

19 April 2019 43	Walsall	1–1	Southend United	Walsall
15:00 BST	Johnson (yellow card) 76'; Oteh (yellow card) 90+4' (goal) 90+4' (pen.)	Report	Cox 43'; Hart (yellow card) 53'; White (yellow card) 81'; Oxley (yellow card) 90+4'; Turner (yellow card) 90+4'	Stadium: Bescot Stadium; Attendance: 4,624; Referee: Ross Joyce

22 April 2019 44	Southend United	3–2	Burton Albion	Southend-on-Sea
13:00 BST	Mantom 18'; Bunn 48'; Dieng 77'; Cox (yellow card) 80'	Report	Brayford 60'; Fox (yellow card) 75'; Quinn (yellow card) 77'; Harness 86'	Stadium: Roots Hall; Attendance: 6,169; Referee: Dean Whitestone

27 April 2019 45	Rochdale	1–0	Southend United	Rochdale
15:00 BST	Williams (yellow card) 38'; Henderson 53'	Report		Stadium: Spotland Stadium; Attendance: 5,000; Referee: Ben Toner

4 May 2019 46	Southend United	2–1	Sunderland	Southend-on-Sea
17:30 BST	Kiernan (yellow card) 41'; White 43'; Humphrys 87' (yellow card) 88'	Report	Wyke (yellow card) 39'; Maguire 75' (pen.)	Stadium: Roots Hall; Attendance: 10,779; Referee: Darren Bond

=== FA Cup ===
The first round draw was made live on BBC by Dennis Wise and Dion Dublin on 22 October. The draw for the second round was made live on BBC and BT by Mark Schwarzer and Glenn Murray on 12 November.

10 November 2018 First round	Southend United	1–1	Crawley Town	Southend-on-Sea
15:00 GMT	Kightly 9'	Report	White 85' (o.g.)	Stadium: Roots Hall; Attendance: 3,935; Referee: Scott Oldham

20 November 2018 First round replay	Crawley Town	2–6 (a.e.t.)	Southend United	Crawley
19:45 GMT	Palmer 55', 68'	Report	Doherty 17' (o.g.); Bunn 31'; Cox 92'; White 97'; Mantom 106'; McLaughlin 114'	Stadium: Broadfield Stadium; Attendance: 3,120; Referee: Charles Breakspear

1 December 2018 Second round	Southend United	2–4	Barnsley	Southend-on-Sea
15:00 GMT	Mantom 45+4'; Dieng 84'	Report	Moore 41'; Woodrow 56', 70'; Bähre 90+5'	Stadium: Roots Hall; Attendance: 3,616; Referee: Paul Marsden

=== EFL Cup ===
On 15 June 2018, the draw for the first round was made in Vietnam.

14 August 2018 First round	Southend United	2–4	Brentford	Southend-on-Sea
19:45 BST	Robinson 62'; McCoulsky 72'	Report	Forss 42'; Jeanvier 64'; Benrahma 67'; Mokotjo 85'	Stadium: Roots Hall; Attendance: 3,055; Referee: Keith Stroud

=== EFL Trophy ===
On 13 July 2018, the initial group stage draw bar the U21 invited clubs was announced. The draw for the second round was made live on Talksport by Leon Britton and Steve Claridge on 16 November. On 8 December, the third round draw was drawn by Alan McInally and Matt Le Tissier on Soccer Saturday.

Pos	Lge	Team	Pld	W	PW	PL	L	GF	GA	GD	Pts	Qualification
1	L2	Cambridge United	3	2	0	0	1	8	4	+4	6	Round 2
2	L1	Southend United	3	2	0	0	1	6	3	+3	6	Round 2
3	L2	Colchester United	3	1	0	0	2	3	5	−2	3	
4	ACA	Southampton U21	3	1	0	0	2	2	7	−5	3	

Source: EFL.com

4 September 2018 Group stages	Southend United	3–1	Cambridge United	Southend-on-Sea
19:45 BST	McCoulsky 55', 64'; Hutchinson 87'	Report	Lambe 53'	Stadium: Roots Hall; Attendance: 1,421; Referee: Gavin Ward

9 October 2018 Group stages	Colchester United	2–0	Southend United	Colchester
19:45 BST	Kent 39'; Collins 49'	Report		Stadium: Colchester Community Stadium; Attendance: 1,516

14 November 2018 Group stages	Southend United	3–0	Southampton U21	Southend-on-Sea
19:45 GMT	Bunn 12'; Kyprianou 17'; Bwomono 24'	Report		Stadium: Roots Hall; Attendance: 983

5 December 2018 Second round	Luton Town	1–1 (2–4 p)	Southend United	Luton
19:45 GMT	Read 81'	Report	McLaughlin 88'	Stadium: Kenilworth Road; Attendance: 1,545

8 January 2019 Third round	Southend United	0–2	Portsmouth	Southend-on-Sea
19:45 GMT		Report	Dennis 6'; Evans 45+2'	Stadium: Roots Hall; Attendance: 1,649; Referee: Craig Hicks

== Transfers ==
=== Transfers in ===
Date from	Position	Nationality	Name	From	Fee	Ref.
1 July 2018	AM	(England)	Sam Barratt	Maidenhead United	Undisclosed	
1 July 2018	DM	(France)	Timothée Dieng	Bradford City	Free transfer	
1 July 2018	CF	(England)	Tom Hopper	Scunthorpe United	Free transfer	
1 July 2018	CB	(England)	Harry Lennon	Charlton Athletic	Nominal fee	
1 July 2018	CM	(England)	Sam Mantom	Scunthorpe United	Undisclosed	
2 July 2018	CM	(England)	Luke Hyam	Ipswich Town	Free transfer	
19 January 2019	CF	(England)	Stephen Humphrys	Fulham	Undisclosed	

=== Transfers out ===
Date from	Position	Nationality	Name	To	Fee	Ref.
1 July 2018	LW	(England)	Alex Clark	Free agent	Released	
1 July 2018	LW	(England)	Nico Cotton	Lewes	Released	
1 July 2018	CM	(England)	Harry Cuthbert	Free agent	Released	
1 July 2018	LB	(England)	Yonis Farah	Free agent	Released	
1 July 2018	CF	(French Guiana)	Marc-Antoine Fortuné	Chesterfield	Released	
1 July 2018	CF	(England)	Freddie Ladapo	Plymouth Argyle	Released	
1 July 2018	CB	(Japan)	Daniel Matsuzaka	(Japan) Kataller Toyama	Released	
1 July 2018	RM	(England)	Jermaine McGlashan	Swindon Town	Released	
1 July 2018	CM	(Republic of Ireland)	Michael Timlin	Stevenage	Free transfer	
1 July 2018	CF	(England)	Dan Walker	Free agent	Released	
1 July 2018	CM	(England)	Anthony Wordsworth	AFC Wimbledon	Released	
1 July 2018	CM	(England)	Josh Wright	Bradford City	Released	
5 July 2018	DM	(England)	Silva Nunes	(Gibraltar) Bruno's Magpies	Free transfer	
31 August 2018	CB	(England)	Anton Ferdinand	(Scotland) St Mirren	Mutual consent	
14 December 2018	MF	(England)	Joe Bedford	Dover Athletic	Free transfer	
24 January 2019	CB	(England)	Taylor Curran	Swindon Town	Undisclosed	

=== Loans in ===
Start date	Position	Nationality	Name	From	End date	Ref.
10 August 2018	CF	(England)	Shawn McCoulsky	Bristol City	3 January 2019	
28 August 2018	LW	(England)	Harry Bunn	Bury	31 May 2019	
31 August 2018	RB	(England)	Taylor Moore	Bristol City	31 May 2019	
8 September 2018	GK	(England)	David Stockdale	Birmingham City	22 September 2018	
15 January 2019	LB	(England)	Sam Hart	Blackburn Rovers	31 May 2019	

=== Loans out ===
Start date	Position	Nationality	Name	To	End date	Ref.
7 September 2018	CF	(France)	Amadou Ba	Dartford	October 2018	
21 September 2018	CF	(England)	Norman Wabo	Maidstone United	19 October 2018	
16 November 2018	CF	(England)	Norman Wabo	Braintree Town	December 2018	
18 November 2018	DF	(England)	Taylor Curran	Braintree Town	December 2018	
31 January 2019	CF	(Jamaica)	Theo Robinson	Swindon Town	31 May 2019	
22 March 2019	RB	(England)	Rob Howard	Harlow Town	31 May 2019	
