= 2019–20 Southend United F.C. season =

Southend United
2019–20 season
- Chairman: Ron Martin
- Manager: Kevin Bond (until 6 September); Sol Campbell (from 23 October)
- Stadium: Roots Hall
- League One: 22nd (relegated)
- FA Cup: First round
- EFL Cup: Second round
- EFL Trophy: First round

The 2019–20 season was Southend United's 114th year in existence and their fifth consecutive season in League One. Along with competing in League One, the club participated in the FA Cup, EFL Cup and EFL Trophy.

The season covers the period from 1 July 2019 to 30 June 2020.

== Pre-season ==
The pre-season schedule was confirmed by the club in June 2019.

6 July 2019 Friendly	Reading	2–0	Southend United	Wokingham
12:00 BST (UTC+1)	Olise 29'; Barrow 50'	Report		Stadium: Hogwood Park; Attendance: Behind Closed Doors

9 July 2019 Friendly	Billericay Town	2–3	Southend United	Billericay
19:45 BST (UTC+1)	Kennedy 10', Egole 73'	Report	Jordan 26', Kiernan 63', Humphrys 70'	Stadium: AGP Arena

12 July 2019 Friendly	Weymouth	2–2	Southend United	Weymouth
19:45 BST (UTC+1)	Bell-Baggie 12'; McCarthy 75'	Report	Humphrys 24'; Hutchinson 41'	Stadium: Bob Lucas Stadium; Attendance: 620

20 July 2019 Friendly	Dagenham & Redbridge	1–1	Southend United	Dagenham
15:00 BST (UTC+1)	Quigley 37'	Report	Goodship 29'	Stadium: Victoria Road; Attendance: 904; Referee: Tony Goddard

24 July 2019 Friendly	Southend United	2–1	Millwall	Southend-on-Sea
19:30 BST (UTC+1)	Robinson 76', 80'	Report	Ralph 48' (o.g.)	Stadium: Roots Hall; Attendance: 2,070; Referee: John Brooks

26 July 2019 Friendly	Gillingham	1–1	Southend United	Gillingham
19:00 BST (UTC+1)	Mandron 40'	Report	Hutchinson 23'	Stadium: Priestfield Stadium

27 July 2019 Friendly	Maidstone United	4–0	Southend United	Maidstone
15:00 BST	Amaluzor 19' (pen.), 35', 75'; Kyei 39'			Stadium: Gallagher Stadium

== Competitions ==
=== League One ===
==== League table ====
Pos	Team	Pld	W	D	L	GF	GA	GD	Pts	PPG	Promotion, qualification or relegation
17	Accrington Stanley	35	10	10	15	47	53	−6	40	1.14	
18	Rochdale	34	10	6	18	39	57	−18	36	1.06	
19	Milton Keynes Dons	35	10	7	18	36	47	−11	37	1.06	
20	AFC Wimbledon	35	8	11	16	39	52	−13	35	1.00	
21	Tranmere Rovers (R)	34	8	8	18	36	60	−24	32	0.94	Relegation to EFL League Two
22	Southend United (R)	35	4	7	24	39	85	−46	19	0.54	Relegation to EFL League Two
23	Bolton Wanderers (R)	34	5	11	18	27	66	−39	14 (Note: Bolton Wanderers deducted 12 points for entering administration.)	0.41	Relegation to EFL League Two
24	Bury (E, R)	0	0	0	0	0	0	0	−12 (Note: Bury deducted 12 points for entering into an insolvency event, before later being expelled from the EFL on 27 August 2019. At the time of their expulsion, they had played no matches.)	—	Club expelled

Source: EFL Official Website
Rules for classification: 1) Points per game; 2) Goal difference; 3) Number of goals scored; 4) Head-to-head results; 5) Wins; 6) Away goals; 7) Penalty points (sec 9.5); 8) 12-point sending-off offences
(E) Eliminated; (R) Relegated

==== Results summary ====
Overall								Home						Away					
Pld	W	D	L	GF	GA	GD	Pts	W	D	L	GF	GA	GD	W	D	L	GF	GA	GD
35	4	7	24	39	85	−46	19	2	4	11	18	42	−24	2	3	13	21	43	−22

Last updated: 7 March 2020.
Source: BBC

==== Results by matchday ====
Round	1	2	3	4	5	6	7	8	9	10	11	12	13	14	15	16	17	18	19	20	21	22	23	24	25	26	27	28	29	30	31	32	33	34	35
Ground	A	H	A	H	A	H	H	A	A	H	A	H	A	H	H	A	A	H	A	A	H	A	H	A	H	A	A	H	A	A	H	H	H	A	H
Result	L	L	L	L	L	L	D	L	W	L	L	L	D	L	L	L	L	L	D	L	D	L	D	D	D	W	L	W	L	L	L	L	L	L	W
Position	19	22	22	22	22	22	22	22	21	21	22	22	22	22	22	22	22	22	22	22	22	22	22	22	22	22	22	22	22	22	22	22	22	22	22

Updated to match(es) played on 7 March 2020. Source:
A = Away; H = Home; W = Win; D = Draw; L = Loss

==== Matches ====
On Thursday, 20 June 2019, the EFL League One fixtures were revealed.

3 August 2019 1	Coventry City	1–0	Southend United	Bordesley
15:00 BST	Westbrooke 51'; Kelly (yellow card) 88'	Report	Lennon (yellow card) 90+6'	Stadium: St Andrew's Trillion Trophy Stadium; Attendance: 6,534; Referee: Craig Hicks

10 August 2019 2	Southend United	1–3	Blackpool	Southend-on-Sea
15:00 BST	Ralph (yellow card) 8'; Cox 75'	Report	Lennon 9' (o.g.); Delfouneso 12', 37'; Husband (red card) 60'; Gnanduillet (yellow card) 82'	Stadium: Roots Hall; Attendance: 6,823; Referee: Kevin Johnson

17 August 2019 3	Lincoln City	4–0	Southend	Lincoln
15:00 BST	Shackell 31'; Toffolo 40'; Walker 48' (pen.); Andrade 81'	Report	Bwomono (yellow card) 45'; Shaughnessy (yellow card) 47'; Milligan (yellow card) 61'	Stadium: Sincil Bank; Attendance: 9,016; Referee: Andy Haines

20 August 2019 4	Southend United	0–2	Peterborough United	Southend-on-Sea
19:45 BST	Mantom (yellow card) 7'	Report	Eisa 55'; Toney 57'	Stadium: Roots Hall; Attendance: 5,890; Referee: Alan Young

24 August 2019 5	Wycombe Wanderers	4–3	Southend United	High Wycombe
15:00 BST	Milligan 36' (o.g.); Kashket 55', 90+2'; Stewart 89'	Report	Goodship 11'; Humphrys 30', 47'; Lennon (yellow card) 43'; Bishop (yellow card) 75'	Stadium: Adams Park; Attendance: 4,196; Referee: Darren Drysdale

31 August 2019 6	Southend United	0–3	Rochdale	Southend-on-Sea
15:00 BST	Hyam (yellow card) 16'; Hamilton (yellow card) 29'	Report	Henderson 35'; Morley 37'; Williams (yellow card) 43'; Camps 77'	Stadium: Roots Hall; Attendance: 5,614; Referee: Lee Swabey

7 September 2019	Portsmouth	v	Southend United	Milton
15:00 BST		Report		Stadium: Fratton Park
Note: The match was postponed on 1 September 2019 due to international call-ups.

14 September 2019 7	Southend United	3–3	Fleetwood Town	Southend-on-Sea
15:00 BST	McLaughlin 17'; Kiernan (yellow card) 32'; Humphrys 48', 87'	Report	Clarke (yellow card) 17'; Dunne 34'; Morris 45+1'; Dempsey 52'; Coutts (yellow card) 78'; Burns (yellow card) 78'	Stadium: Roots Hall; Attendance: 5,236; Referee: John Busby

17 September 2019 8	Shrewsbury Town	4–3	Southend United	Shrewsbury
19:45 BST	Beckles 19'; Cummings 27'; Goss (yellow card) 40'; Norburn 61'; Lang 83'	Report	McLaughlin 29'; Ralph (yellow card) 67'; Humphrys 77'; Cox 90+1'	Stadium: Montgomery Waters Meadow; Attendance: 4,909; Referee: James Adcock

21 September 2019 9	Milton Keynes Dons	0–1	Southend United	Denbigh
15:00 BST	Poole (yellow card) 28'	Report	Kelman 4'; McLaughlin (yellow card) 42'; Hamilton (yellow card) 54'; Lennon (yellow card) 64'; Cox (yellow card) 85'	Stadium: Stadium mk Attendance: 7,493; Referee: Anthony Coggins

28 September 2019 10	Southend United	0–1	Accrington Stanley	Southend-on-Sea
15:00 BST	Ralph (yellow card) 22' (yellow-red card) 73'	Report	Johnson (yellow card) 24'; Bishop 52'; Conneely (yellow card) 83'	Stadium: Roots Hall; Attendance: 5,643; Referee: Charles Breakspear

5 October 2019 11	Gillingham	3–1	Southend United	Gillingham
15:00 BST	Jones 43'; O'Keefe 46'; Fuller (yellow card) 57'; Ndjoli (penalty missed) 72' (penalty missed) 74'; Hanlan 87'	Report	Cox 58'; Acquah (yellow card) 63' (yellow-red card) 66'; Lennon (yellow card) 71'; Bwomono (yellow card) 71'; Kiernan (yellow card) 81'	Stadium: Priestfield Stadium; Attendance: 5,091; Referee: Leigh Doughty

12 October 2019 12	Southend United	1–4	AFC Wimbledon	Southend-on-Sea
15:00 BST	Dieng 13' (yellow card) 81'; Kiernan (yellow card) 51'; McLaughlin (yellow card) 70'	Report	Forss 5', 11', 52' (pen.); Wordsworth (yellow card) 45+1'; Kalambayi (yellow card) 54'; Delaney 72'; Pinnock (yellow card) 84'	Stadium: Roots Hall; Attendance: 6,420; Referee: Simon Hooper

18 October 2019 13	Tranmere Rovers	1–1	Southend United	Birkenhead
19:45 BST	Monthé (yellow card) 68'; Mullin 85' (pen.)	Report	Hopper 9'; McLaughlin (yellow card) 64'; Shaughnessy (yellow card) 81'; Dieng (yellow card) 90+4'	Stadium: Prenton Park; Attendance: 7,066; Referee: David Webb

22 October 2019 14	Southend United	1–7	Doncaster Rovers	Southend-on-Sea
19:45 BST	Hamilton (red card) 6'; Hutchinson 11'; McLaughlin (red card) 53'; Milligan (yellow card) 60'; Lennon (yellow card) 67'	Report	Daniels (yellow card) 1'; Thomas 23' 52'; Sheaf 26'; Whiteman 70'; Sadlier 82'; May 89'; Ralph 90+1' (o.g.)	Stadium: Roots Hall; Attendance: 5,066; Referee: Josh Smith

26 October 2019 15	Southend United	1–3	Ipswich Town	Southend-on-Sea
15:00 BST	Humphrys (yellow card) 38'; Cox (yellow card) 75'; Acquah 83'	Report	Norwood 8', 70'; Downes (yellow card) 10'; Jackson (yellow card) 48' (goal) 76'	Stadium: Roots Hall; Attendance: 8,632; Referee: Andy Davies

2 November 2019 16	Sunderland	1–0	Southend United	Sunderland
15:00 GMT	O'Nien 20' (yellow card) 90+1'; McLaughlin (yellow card) 84'	Report	Hopper (yellow card) 73'	Stadium: Stadium of Light; Attendance: 30,407; Referee: Trevor Kettle

5 November 2019 17	Portsmouth	4–1	Southend United	Milton
19:45 GMT	Marquis 45+2' (yellow card) 90+3'; Harrison 50', 80' (pen.); Harness 84'	Report	Goodship 69'; Milligan (yellow card) 90+1'	Stadium: Fratton Park; Attendance: 16,995; Referee: Lee Swabey

16 November 2019	Burton Albion	v	Southend United	Burton upon Trent
15:00 GMT		Report		Stadium: Pirelli Stadium
Note: On 5 November, the match was postponed due to international call-ups.

23 November 2019 18	Southend United	0–4	Oxford United	Southend-on-Sea
15:00 GMT	Milligan (yellow card) 45+2'	Report	Taylor 1', 84'; Rodriguez (yellow card) 26'; Henry 33' (yellow card) 35'; Agyei 86'	Stadium: Roots Hall; Attendance: 6,835; Referee: Tom Nield

3 December 2019 19	Burton Albion	1–1	Southend United	Burton upon Trent
19:45 GMT	O'Toole (red card) 33'; Fraser 49'; Buxton (yellow card) 81'	Report	McLaughlin 21' (yellow card) 52'; Demetriou (yellow card) 35'; Dieng (yellow card) 48'	Stadium: Pirelli Stadium; Attendance: 1,880; Referee: Darren Drysdale

7 December 2019 20	Bristol Rovers	4–2	Southend United	Horfield
15:00 GMT	Little (yellow card) 25'; Craig (yellow card) 27'; Ogogo (yellow card) 42' (goal) 56'; Clarke-Harris 48' (pen.); Upson 75'; Kilgour 81'	Report	Hopper 13'; Goodship 36'; Kiernan (yellow card) 45'; Taylor (yellow card) 85'	Stadium: Memorial Stadium; Attendance: 6,797; Referee: James Oldham

14 December 2019 21	Southend United	2–2	Rotherham United	Southend-on-Sea
15:00 GMT	Demetriou 49' (pen.); Mantom 52'; Goodship (yellow card) 80'	Report	Kiernan 30' (o.g.); Barlaser (yellow card) 37'; Smith (yellow card) 42'; Ogbene (yellow card) 48'; Ladapo 60'; Robertson (yellow card) 80'; Ihiekwe (yellow card) 80'	Stadium: Roots Hall; Attendance: 5,652; Referee: Charles Breakspear

21 December 2019 22	Bolton Wanderers	3–2	Southend United	Horwich
15:00 GMT	Dodoo 36'; L. Murphy 45+2'; D. Murphy 64'; Earl (yellow card) 66'; Wright (yellow card) 71'	Report	Lennon 10'; Dieng 81'	Stadium: University of Bolton Stadium; Attendance: 12,055; Referee: Ben Toner

26 December 2019 23	Southend United	2–2	Milton Keynes Dons	Southend-on-Sea
15:00 GMT	Demitriou 32' (pen.); Dieng (yellow card) 41'; Kiernan 66'; Mantom (yellow card) 74'	Report	Mason 13'; Nicholls (yellow card) 31'; Houghton (yellow card) 34'; Gilbey (yellow card) 56'; Healey 64'	Stadium: Roots Hall; Attendance: 6,189; Referee: Neil Hair

1 January 2020 24	AFC Wimbledon	1–1	Southend United	Norbiton
15:00 GMT	Reilly 23'	Report	Hopper (yellow card) 85'; Kelman 90+1' (pen.) (yellow card) 90+2'	Stadium: The Cherry Red Records Stadium; Attendance: 4,422; Referee: Craig Hicks

4 January 2020	Southend United	v	Gillingham	Southend-on-Sea
15:00 GMT		Report		Stadium: Roots Hall
Note: The match was postponed on 2 December, due to Gillingham's progression in the FA Cup.

11 January 2020 25	Southend United	0–0	Tranmere Rovers	Southend-on-Sea
15:00 GMT	Demetriou (yellow card) 78'	Report	Monthé (yellow card) 16'; Mullin (yellow card) 40'; Clarke (yellow card) 41'; Danns (yellow card) 66'; Ferrier (yellow card) 84'	Stadium: Roots Hall; Attendance: 5,988; Referee: Alan Young

18 January 2020 26	Accrington Stanley	1–2	Southend United	Accrington
15:00 GMT	Charles 17'; Bishop (yellow card) 80'	Report	Kelman 11'; Demetriou 51' (pen.)	Stadium: Wham Stadium; Attendance: 2,146; Referee: Antony Coggins

28 January 2020 27	Doncaster Rovers	3–1	Southend United	Doncaster
19:45 GMT	Ennis 24'; Sadlier 41' 55'	Report	Milligan (yellow card) 59'; Phillips 70'	Stadium: Keepmoat Stadium; Attendance: 7,063; Referee: Darren Drysdale

1 February 2020 28	Southend United	2–1	Lincoln City	Southend-on-Sea
15:00 GMT	Phillips (yellow card) 6'; Milligan (yellow card) 45'; Kelman 63'; Demetriou (yellow card) 83'; Bwomono 90+5'	Report	John-Jules (yellow card) 67'; Anderson 89'; Bolger (yellow card) 90'	Stadium: Roots Hall; Attendance: 6,605; Referee: Charles Breakspear

8 February 2020 29	Blackpool	2–1	Southend United	Blackpool
15:00 GMT	Gnanduillet 37', 64' (pen.)	Report	McLaughlin 72', (yellow card) 90'	Stadium: Bloomfield Road; Attendance: 7,870; Referee: Anthony Backhouse

11 February 2020 30	Peterborough United	4–0	Southend United	Peterborough
19:45 GMT	Toney (yellow card) 45+1' (goal) 70', 74'; Dembélé 50'; Taylor 57'	Report	McLaughlin (yellow card) 28'; Mantom (yellow card) 48'; Bwomono (yellow card) 71'; Milligan (yellow card) 78'; Demetriou (yellow card) 80'	Stadium: Weston Homes Stadium; Attendance: 5,036; Referee: Carl Boyeson

15 February 2020 31	Southend United	0–2	Coventry City	Southend-on-Sea
15:00 GMT		Report	Dabo (yellow card) 31'; O'Hare 60'; Biamou 79'	Stadium: Roots Hall; Attendance: 7,278; Referee: Sam Purkiss

18 February 2020 32	Southend United	0–1	Gillingham	Southend-on-Sea
19:45 GMT	Mitchell-Nelson (yellow card) 74'; Kelman (yellow card) 90+3'	Report	Tucker (yellow card) 30'; Ogilvie 67'; Ehmer (yellow card) 72'	Stadium: Roots Hall; Referee: Trevor Kettle

22 February 2020 33	Southend United	2–3	Burton Albion	Southend-on-Sea
15:00 GMT	Mantom 29'; O'Toole 90+1' (o.g.)	Report	Akins 5' (yellow card) 90+3'; Edwards 49'; O'Toole (yellow card) 54'; Murphy 74'	Stadium: Roots Hall; Attendance: 5,571; Referee: Craig Hicks

29 February 2020 34	Oxford United	2–1	Southend United	Oxford
15:00 GMT	Henry 17' (pen.); Rodriguez (yellow card) 51'; Taylor 84'	Report	Gard 45'; McLaughlin (yellow card) 54'	Stadium: Kassam Stadium; Attendance: 7,451; Referee: Lee Swabey

7 March 2020 35	Southend United	3–1	Bristol Rovers	Southend-on-Sea
15:00 GMT	Kelman 18'; Egbri 55'; Demetriou (yellow card) 70'; Kilgour 79' (o.g.)	Report	Mitchell-Lawson 46'; Upson (yellow card) 64'; Harries (yellow card) 86'	Stadium: Roots Hall; Attendance: 5,806; Referee: James Oldham

14 March 2020	Rotherham United	v	Southend United	Rotherham
15:00 GMT				Stadium: AESSEAL New York Stadium
Note: Season was suspended until 3 April 2020, due to the COVID-19 pandemic.

21 March 2020	Southend United	v	Bolton Wanderers	Southend-on-Sea
15:00 GMT				Stadium: Roots Hall
Note: Season was suspended until 3 April 2020, due to the COVID-19 pandemic.

28 March 2020	Southend United	v	Sunderland	Southend-on-Sea
15:00 GMT				Stadium: Roots Hall
Note: Season was suspended until 3 April 2020, due to the COVID-19 pandemic.

4 April 2020	Ipswich Town	v	Southend United	Ipswich
15:00 GMT				Stadium: Portman Road
Note: On 3 April, the English Football League decided to postpone all football until safe to do so due to the COVID-19 pandemic.

10 April 2020	Southend United	v	Wycombe Wanderers	Southend-on-Sea
15:00 BST				Stadium: Roots Hall
Note: On 3 April, the English Football League decided to postpone all football until safe to do so due to the COVID-19 pandemic.

13 April 2020	Rochdale	v	Southend United	Spotland
13:00 BST				Stadium: Crown Oil Arena
Note: On 3 April, the English Football League decided to postpone all football until safe to do so due to the COVID-19 pandemic.

18 April 2020	Southend United	v	Portsmouth	Southend-on-Sea
15:00 BST				Stadium: Roots Hall
Note: On 3 April, the English Football League decided to postpone all football until safe to do so due to the COVID-19 pandemic.

25 April 2020	Fleetwood Town	v	Southend United	Fleetwood
15:00 BST				Stadium: Highbury Stadium
Note: On 3 April, the English Football League decided to postpone all football until safe to do so due to the COVID-19 pandemic.

3 May 2020	Southend United	v	Shrewsbury Town	Southend-on-Sea
15:00 BST				Stadium: Roots Hall
Note: On 3 April, the English Football League decided to postpone all football until safe to do so due to the COVID-19 pandemic.

=== FA Cup ===
The first round draw was made on 21 October 2019.

10 November 2019 First round	Dover Athletic	1–0	Southend United	River
12:00 GMT	Taylor (yellow card) 21'; Rooney (yellow card) 71'; Sotiriou 84'	Report	Bwomono (yellow card) 14'; McLaughlin (yellow card) 17'; Dieng (yellow card) 90+2'	Stadium: The Perrys Crabble Stadium; Attendance: 1,754; Referee: David Rock

=== EFL Cup ===
The first round draw was made on 20 June. The second round draw was made on 13 August 2019 following the conclusion of all but one first-round matches.

13 August 2019 First round	Stevenage	1–2	Southend United	Stevenage
19:45 BST	Parrett 14'; Guthrie (yellow card) 45+5'; Fernandez (yellow card) 72'	Report	Kelman 47', 55'; Hutchinson (yellow card) 69'	Stadium: Lamex Stadium; Referee: Chris Sarginson

27 August 2019 Second round	Southend United	1–4	Milton Keynes Dons	Southend-on-Sea
19:45 BST	Humphrys (yellow card) 28'; Goodship 54'	Report	Healey 35'; Brittain 41'; Boateng 82'; Nombe 90+2'	Stadium: Roots Hall; Attendance: 2,433; Referee: Neil Hair

=== EFL Trophy ===
On 9 July 2019, the pre-determined group stage draw was announced with Invited clubs to be drawn on 12 July 2019.

Pos	Div	Team	Pld	W	PW	PL	L	GF	GA	GD	Pts	Qualification
1	ACA	Brighton & Hove Albion U21	3	2	0	1	0	5	1	+4	7	Advance to Round 2
2	L2	Leyton Orient	3	1	1	0	1	3	4	−1	5	Advance to Round 2
3	L1	AFC Wimbledon	3	1	0	0	2	4	5	−1	3	
4	L1	Southend United	3	1	0	0	2	3	5	−2	3	

Source: EFL.com

3 September 2019 Group stage	Leyton Orient	2–0	Southend United	Leyton
19:45 BST	Happe 6'; Gorman (yellow card) 45' (goal) 90'; Angol (yellow card) 90+2'	Report	Hutchinson (red card) 45+1'; Cox (yellow card) 70'	Stadium: The Breyer Group Stadium; Attendance: 1,562; Referee: Chris Pollard

1 October 2019 Group stage	Southend United	0–2	Brighton & Hove Albion U21	Southend-on-Sea
19:45 BST	Demetriou (yellow card) 5'; Hyam (yellow card) 56'	Report	Richards 50'; Davies (yellow card) 56'; O'Hora 81'	Stadium: Roots Hall; Referee: Trevor Kettle

13 November 2019 Group stage	Southend United	3–1	AFC Wimbledon	Southend-on-Sea
19:45 GMT	Ralph 25'; Hamilton 45+1'; Hopper 80'	Report	Madelin (yellow card) 24'; Wood 35'	Stadium: Roots Hall; Attendance: 717; Referee: Will Finnie

== Transfers ==
=== Transfers in ===
Date from	Position	Nationality	Name	From	Fee	Ref.
1 July 2019	CF	(England)	Brandon Goodship	(England) Weymouth	Undisclosed	
1 July 2019	DM	(Australia)	Mark Milligan	(Scotland) Hibernian	Free transfer	
1 July 2019	CB	(England)	Richard Taylor	(England) Burnley	Free transfer	
9 July 2019	LB	(England)	Nathan Ralph	(Scotland) Dundee	Free transfer	
1 August 2019	CB	(Republic of Ireland)	Joe Shaughnessy	(Scotland) St Johnstone	Free transfer	
2 August 2019	CB	(England)	Liam Ridgewell	(England) Hull City	Free transfer	
2 August 2019	LB	(England)	Andre Blackman	Free agent	Free transfer	

=== Loans in ===
Date from	Position	Nationality	Name	From	Date until	Ref.
7 August 2019	LW	(England)	Layton Ndukwu	(England) Leicester City	8 January 2020	
16 August 2019	CM	(Scotland)	Ethan Hamilton	(England) Manchester United	3 January 2020	
20 February 2020	GK	(Iceland)	Patrik Gunnarsson	(England) Brentford	27 February 2020	

=== Transfers out ===
Date from	Position	Nationality	Name	To	Fee	Ref.
1 July 2019	CF	(France)	Amadou Ba	Free agent	Released	
1 July 2019	MF	(Botswana)	Renei Batlokwa	Free agent	Released	
1 July 2019	GK	(England)	Josh Bexon	Free agent	Released	
1 July 2019	LB	(England)	Ben Coker	(England) Lincoln City	Released	
1 July 2019	LB	(Scotland)	Stephen Hendrie	(Scotland) Kilmarnock	Released	
1 July 2019	DF	(England)	Dan Humphreys	(England) Canvey Island	Released	
1 July 2019	DF	(England)	Joe Mackenzie	Free agent	Released	
1 July 2019	MF	(England)	Sewa Marah	Free agent	Released	
1 July 2019	GK	(England)	Ted Smith	Free agent	Released	
1 July 2019	CB	(England)	Michael Turner	Free agent	Released	
1 July 2019	CF	(England)	Norman Wabo	(England) Dartford	Released	
5 August 2019	CM	(England)	Dru Yearwood	(England) Brentford	Undisclosed	
4 October 2019	LB	(England)	Andre Blackman	Free agent	Released	
16 January 2020	CF	(Republic of Ireland)	Simon Cox	(Australia) Western Sydney Wanderers	Released	
23 January 2020	CF	(England)	Tom Hopper	(England) Lincoln City	Undisclosed	
30 January 2020	GK	(England)	Nathan Bishop	(England) Manchester United	Undisclosed	
31 January 2020	CB	(Republic of Ireland)	Rob Kiernan	Free agent	Mutual consent	
31 January 2020	CB	(England)	Liam Ridgewell	Free agent	Mutual consent	

=== Loans out ===
Date from	Position	Nationality	Name	To	Date until	Ref.
4 August 2019	CM	(England)	Michael Klass	(England) Bromley	September 2019	
23 August 2019	RB	(England)	Rob Howard	(England) Dartford	September 2019	
29 August 2019	CF	(Jamaica)	Theo Robinson	(England) Colchester United	1 January 2020	
18 October 2019	DF	(England)	Sam Knock	(England) Hullbridge Sports	November 2019	
15 November 2019	FW	(Wales)	Freddy Eastwood	(England) Canvey Island	December 2019	
14 January 2020	CF	(Jamaica)	Theo Robinson	(England) Colchester United	30 June 2020	
28 January 2020	CF	(England)	Emile Acquah	(England) Maidenhead United	March 2020	
8 February 2020	MF	(England)	Sam Brogan	(England) Canvey Island		
8 February 2020	FW	(Wales)	Freddy Eastwood	(England) Canvey Island		
8 February 2020	MF	(England)	O'Shane Stewart	(England) Merstham		
