= Norman Wabo =

English footballer (born 1998)

Personal information
- Full name: Fotsing Norman Arthur Pitoula Wabo
- Date of birth: 6 May 1998 (age 28)
- Place of birth: Newham, England
- Position: Forward

Youth career
- 2013–2017: Southend United

Senior career*
Years	Team	Apps	(Gls)
2017–2019	Southend United	5	(0)
2017	→ Cambridge City (loan)	5	(4)
2018	→ Ebbsfleet United (loan)	6	(0)
2018	→ Maidstone United (loan)	2	(0)
2018	→ Braintree Town (loan)	5	(0)
2019–2020	Dartford	17	(4)
2020	→ Cheshunt (loan)	8	(0)
2020–2021	Margate	0	(0)
2021	→ Concord Rangers (loan)	1	(0)
2021–2022	Billericay Town	12	(4)
2022	→ Bowers & Pitsea (loan)	5	(1)
2022	→ Potters Bar Town (loan)	5	(0)
2023	Eastbourne Borough	14	(2)
2023	Weymouth	3	(0)
2023–2024	Hayes & Yeading United	15	(3)
2024	Maldon & Tiptree	5	(0)
2024	Sittingbourne	1	(0)
2024–2025	Redbridge	33	(11)
2025–2026	Bowers & Pitsea	16	(3)
2026	Margate	0	(0)
- * Club domestic league appearances and goals as of 18:12, 14 August 2026 (UTC)

Fotsing Norman Arthur Pitoula Wabo (born 6 May 1998) is an English professional footballer who plays as a forward.

== Club career ==
Born in Newham, Wabo joined Southend United at the age of 15, after being scouted playing in an Essex county game. Following an impressive loan spell at Southern League side Cambridge City, where he netted four times in five appearances, Wabo signed his first professional deal with Southend, running until 2018, with an option of a further year. After impressing in the under-23 side, Wabo was rewarded with his Football League debut for Southend during their 3–1 away defeat to Scunthorpe United, replacing Simon Cox in the 87th minute.

On 6 March 2018, after appearing twice more for Southend, Wabo was sent out on loan to National League side Ebbsfleet United for the remainder of the season. Just over two weeks later, he made his debut during their 1–1 home draw with Maidenhead United, replacing Dean Rance with seven minutes remaining. Wabo joined Braintree Town on loan in November 2018.

He was released by Southend at the end of the 2018–19 season.

On 2 August 2019, Wabo joined Dartford for the 2019/20 season.

On 6 January 2020, Wabo joined Cheshunt on an initial month's loan.

On 27 October 2020, Wabo joined Margate.

In February 2021, Wabo joined Concord Rangers on a temporary dual-registration loan deal. He made his debut on 13 February 2021 against Eastbourne Borough.

In January 2022, he signed for Isthmian League Premier Division side Bowers & Pitsea on loan from National League South side Billericay Town. In March 2022, he was again sent out on a dual-registration to fellow Isthmian league side Potters Bar Town until the end of the campaign.

On 23 September 2023, Wabo signed for Hayes & Yeading United.

In October 2024, having started the season with Maldon & Tiptree, Wabo joined Sittingbourne before moving to Isthmian North side Redbridge FC.

In May 2026, Wabo returned to Isthmian League South East Division club Margate. Having not made an appearance, he departed in August.

== Career statistics ==
As of match played 16 September 2023.

Appearances and goals by club, season and competition
Club	Season	League			FA Cup		EFL Cup		Other		Total	
Club	Season	Division	Apps	Goals	Apps	Goals	Apps	Goals	Apps	Goals	Apps	Goals
Southend United	2017–18	League One	3	0	0	0	0	0	0	0	3	0
Southend United	2018–19	League One	2	0	0	0	0	0	0	0	2	0
Southend United	Southend United total		5	0	0	0	0	0	0	0	5	0
Cambridge City (loan)	2016–17	Southern League; Premier Division	5	4	—		—		—		5	4
Ebbsfleet United (loan)	2017–18	National League	6	0	—		—		2	0	8	0
Maidstone United (loan)	2018–19	National League	2	0	—		—		0	0	2	0
Braintree Town (loan)	2018–19	National League	5	0	—		—		0	0	5	0
Dartford	2019–20	National League South	17	4	2	0	—		0	0	19	4
Dartford	Dartford total		17	4	2	0	0	0	0	0	19	4
Cheshunt (loan)	2019–20	Isthmian League; Premier Division	8	0	—		—		1	0	9	0
Margate	2020–21	Isthmian League; Premier Division	0	0	0	0	—		1	2	1	2
Concord Rangers (loan)	2020–21	National League South	1	0	—		—		—		1	0
Billericay Town	2021–22	National League South	12	4	1	0	—		0	0	13	4
Bowers & Pitsea (loan)	2021–22	Isthmian League; Premier Division	5	1	—		—		—		5	1
Potters Bar Town (loan)	2021–22	Isthmian League; Premier Division	5	0	—		—		—		5	0
Eastbourne Borough	2022–23	National League South	14	2	0	0	—		1 (Note: Appearance(s) in Sussex Senior Cup)	0	15	2
Weymouth	2023–24	National League South	3	0	0	0	—		0	0	3	0
Career total			88	15	3	0	0	0	5	2	96	17
