= 2021–22 Southend United F.C. season =

Southend United
2021–22 season
- Chairman: Ron Martin
- Manager: Phil Brown (until 9 October) Jason Demetriou (caretaker from 14 October to 20 October) Kevin Maher (from 20 October)
- Stadium: Roots Hall
- National League: 13th
- FA Cup: First round (eliminated by Chesterfield)
- FA Trophy: Second round (eliminated by Dagenham & Redbridge)
- Top goalscorer: League: Sam Dalby(9 goals); All: Sam Dalby(10 goals)
- Highest home attendance: 8,070 v Bromley, 8 February 2022
- Lowest home attendance: 3,342 v Eastleigh), 5 October 2021
- Average home league attendance: 5,773
- Biggest win: 4–1 v Dover Athletic, 2 November 2021
- Biggest defeat: 0–5 v Stockport County, 9 April 2022

The 2021–22 Southend United F.C. season is the club's 116th season in their history and the first season in the National League following their second successive relegation. Along with the National League, the club will also participate in the FA Cup and FA Trophy.

The season saw a change in manager and first team coaches following the sacking of Phil Brown. Kevin Maher was recruited as first team coach, as well as multiple notable backroom-staff appointments, including former player, Stan Collymore as Senior Football Strategist and John Still as Head of Football.

The season covers the period from 1 July 2021 to 30 June 2022.

== Players ==
As of 1 June 2022

=== Squad ===
Note: Flags indicate national team as defined under FIFA eligibility rules; some limited exceptions apply. Players may hold more than one non-FIFA nationality.

No.	Pos.	Nation	Player
1	GK	ENG	Steve Arnold
2	DF	ENG	Rob Howard
3	DF	ENG	Nathan Ralph
4	MF	ENG	Abu Ogogo
5	DF	ENG	Shaun Hobson
6	MF	ENG	Josh Coulson
7	MF	ENG	Jack Bridge
8	MF	ENG	James Dunne
9	FW	IRL	Rhys Murphy
10	FW	ENG	Sam Dalby
11	FW	ENG	Callum Powell
12	MF	ENG	Tom Clifford
15	MF	ENG	Lewis Gard
16	MF	ENG	Harry Phillips
18	FW	ENG	Matt Rush

No.	Pos.	Nation	Player
19	FW	NGR	Simeon Akinola
20	MF	ENG	Will Atkinson
21	MF	ENG	Harrison Neal (On loan from Sheffield United F.C.)
23	GK	ENG	Collin Adeng-Ndi
24	DF	CYP	Jason Demetriou
25	MF	ENG	Jack Wood
30	FW	ENG	Matthew Dennis (On loan from Norwich City F.C.)
35	DF	ENG	Ollie Kensdale
38	MF	AFG	Noor Husin
39	FW	ENG	Harry Cardwell
40	DF	ENG	John White
—	DF	ENG	Leon Davies
—	DF	ENG	Kenny Clark (On loan from Dagenham & Redbridge F.C.)
—	DF	ENG	Joe Gubbins (On loan from Queens Park Rangers F.C.)
—	MF	ENG	Ashley Nathaniel-George

== Transfers ==
=== Transfers in ===
Date	Position	Nationality	Name	From	Fee	Ref.
4 June 2021	CM	(England)	James Dunne	(England) Barnet F.C.	Free transfer	
9 June 2021	CB	(England)	Josh Coulson	(England) Leyton Orient F.C.	Free transfer	
9 June 2021	LW	(England)	Jack Bridge	(England) Bromley F.C.	Free transfer	
10 June 2021	CF	(England)	Rhys Murphy	(England) Yeovil Town F.C.	Free transfer	
25 June 2021	CM	(England)	Abu Ogogo	(England) Bristol Rovers F.C.	Free transfer	
2 July 2021	GK	(England)	Steve Arnold	(England) Northampton Town F.C.	Free transfer	
28 July 2021	CF	(England)	Sam Dalby	(England) Watford F.C.	Free transfer	
24 August 2021	CM	(England)	Will Atkinson	(England) Alfreton Town F.C.	Free transfer	
31 December 2021	CB	(England)	Ollie Kensdale	(England) Concord Rangers F.C.	Undisclosed	
11 January 2022	RB	(England)	Leon Davies	(England) Cambridge United F.C.	Free transfer	
20 January 2022	CM	(Scotland)	Harry Cardwell	(England) Chorley F.C.	Undisclosed	
21 January 2022	CM	(Afghanistan)	Noor Husin	(England) Dartford F.C.	Undisclosed	
28 January 2022	CM	(England)	Jack Wood	(England) Kings Langley F.C.	Undisclosed	
28 January 2022	CF	(England)	Callum Powell	(England) Kettering Town F.C.	Undisclosed	

=== Loans in ===
Date from	Position	Nationality	Name	From	Date until	Ref.
13 August 2021	CF	(England)	Matthew Dennis	(England) Norwich City F.C.	End of season	
18 August 2021	CF	(England)	Hamzad Kargbo	(England) Queens Park Rangers F.C.	28 October 2021	
1 October 2021	CF	(Sweden)	Benjamin Mbunga Kimpioka	(England) Sunderland A.F.C.	28 October 2021	
28 October 2021	CM	(England)	Zak Brunt	(England) Sheffield United F.C.	4 January 2022	
28 October 2021	CB	(Poland)	Kacper Łopata	(England) Sheffield United F.C.	12 March 2022 (recalled)	
4 January 2022	CM	(England)	Harrison Neal	(England) Sheffield United F.C.	End of season	
24 March 2022	CB	(England)	Kenny Clark	(England) Dagenham & Redbridge F.C.	End of season	
24 March 2022	CB	(England)	Joe Gubbins	(England) Queens Park Rangers F.C.	End of season	

=== Transfers out ===
Date	Position	Nationality	Name	To	Fee	Ref.
17 May 2021	CB	(England)	Richard Taylor	Free Agent	Released	
17 May 2021	CB	(England)	Jacob Mellis	Free Agent	Released	
17 May 2021	CB	(Republic of Ireland)	Alan McCormack	Retired	Released	
17 May 2021	CB	(Cyprus)	Harry Kyprianou	Oxford City F.C.	Released	
5 June 2021	CF	(England)	Brandon Goodship	(England) Weymouth F.C.	Free transfer	
22 June 2021	LB	(England)	Sam Hart	(England) Oldham Athletic A.F.C.	Free transfer	
27 June 2021	CF	(England)	Emile Acquah	(England) Maidenhead United F.C.	Free transfer	
July 2021	CM	(England)	Michael Klass	(England) Lewes F.C.	Free transfer	
1 July 2021	GK	(England)	Mark Oxley	(England) Harrogate Town A.F.C.	Free transfer	
20 July 2021	CM	(France)	Timothée Dieng	(England) Exeter City F.C.	Free transfer	
22 July 2021	CB	(England)	Harry Lennon	(England) Wrexham A.F.C.	Free transfer	
23 July 2021	CB	(Republic of Ireland)	Greg Halford	(Republic of Ireland) Waterford F.C.	Free transfer	
14 August 2021	CM	(England)	Ricky Holmes	(England) Farnborough F.C.	Free transfer	
16 November 2021	RB	(Uganda)	Elvis Bwomono	Free agent	Released	
7 December 2021	LB	(England)	Charlie Sayers	(England) Tottenham Hotspur F.C.	Undisclosed	
4 February 2022	CM	(England)	Nathan Ferguson	(England) Wealdstone F.C.	Free transfer	
11 February 2022	GK	(England)	Harry Seaden	Free Agent	Released	
16 February 2022	CF	(England)	Louis Walsh	(England) Barnet F.C.	Free transfer	

=== Loans out ===
Date from	Position	Nationality	Name	To	Date until	Ref.
22 January 2022	CB	(England)	Miles Mitchell-Nelson	(England) East Thurrock United F.C.	22 February 2022	
22 January 2022	CM	(England)	Eren Kinali	(England) Hendon F.C.	End of season	
22 January 2022	RW	(England)	Terrell Egbri	(England) Farnborough F.C.	End of season	
5 February 2022	CB	(England)	Josh Coulson	(England) King's Lynn Town F.C.	End of season	
11 February 2022	RB	(England)	Rob Howard	(England) Farnborough F.C.	End of season	
11 February 2022	CF	(England)	Matt Rush	(England) Chelmsford City F.C.	End of season	
11 February 2022	LW	(England)	Ashley Nathaniel-George	(England) Ebbsfleet United F.C.	11 March 2022	
11 March 2022	CB	(England)	John White	(England) Wimborne Town F.C.	End of season	
15 March 2022	CB	(England)	Reiss Chandler	(England) Aveley F.C.	End of season	

== Competitions ==
=== National League ===
==== League table ====
Pos	Team	Pld	W	D	L	GF	GA	GD	Pts
11	Torquay United	44	18	12	14	66	54	+12	66
12	Yeovil Town	44	15	14	15	43	46	−3	59
13	Southend United	44	16	10	18	45	61	−16	58
14	Altrincham	44	15	10	19	62	69	−7	55
15	Woking	44	16	5	23	59	61	−2	53

Source: National League official site
Rules for classification: 1) Points; 2) Goal difference; 3) Number of goals scored; 4) Number of matches won; 5) Head-to-head results

==== Results summary ====
Overall								Home						Away					
Pld	W	D	L	GF	GA	GD	Pts	W	D	L	GF	GA	GD	W	D	L	GF	GA	GD
44	16	10	18	45	61	−16	58	10	5	7	26	27	−1	6	5	11	19	34	−15

Last updated: 18 May 2022.
Source: TheFishy

==== Results by matchday ====
Matchday	1	2	3	4	5	6	7	8	9	10	11	12	13	14	15	16	17	18	19	20	21	22	23	24	25	26	27	28	29	30	31	32	33	34	35	36	37	38	39	40	41	42	43	44
Ground	A	H	A	H	A	H	A	A	H	H	A	A	H	H	A	A	H	A	A	A	H	H	A	A	H	H	A	A	H	A	H	A	H	A	A	H	A	H	A	H	H	A	H	H
Result	W	L	D	D	L	L	L	L	W	L	L	L	W	L	L	W	D	L	D	W	W	W	D	W	W	W	W	D	D	D	W	L	W	L	L	L	L	L	W	W	W	L	D	D
Position	8	12	9	13	14	16	19	21	18	20	21	21	20	20	20	21	19	19	19	19	18	18	18	16	13	13	12	12	12	12	12	12	12	12	13	13	13	14	13	13	12	12	12	13

A = Away; H = Home; W = Win; D = Draw; L = Loss

==== Matches ====
The 2021–22 National League fixtures were announced on 7 July 2021.

21 August 2021 1	Kings Lynn Town	0–1	Southend United	Kings Lynn
15:00 BST			Dalby 9'	Stadium: The Walks; Attendance: 2,683; Referee: Daniel Middleton

28 August 2021 2	Southend United	0–1	Stockport County	Southend-on-Sea
15:00 BST			Rooney 16'	Stadium: Roots Hall; Referee: Lewis Smith

30 August 2021 3	Wealdstone	0–0	Southend United	Ruislip
19:45 BST				Stadium: Grosvenor Vale; Attendance: 2,151; Referee: Matthew Russell

4 September 2021 4	Southend United	2–2	Wrexham	Southend-on-Sea
15:00 BST	Dalby 25'; Murphy 52'		Reckord 54'; Angus 52'	Stadium: Roots Hall; Attendance: 6,036; Referee: Alan Dale

11 September 2021 5	FC Halifax Town	3–1	Southend United	Halifax
15:00 BST	Slew 39'; Waters 48'; Maher 73'		Murphy 88'	Stadium: The Shay; Attendance: 1,959; Referee: Andrew Miller

14 September 2021 6	Southend United	2–3	Aldershot	Southend-on-Sea
19:45 BST	Murphy 17'; Demetriou 90+6'		Demetriou 37' (o.g.); Bettamer 50'; Berkeley-Agyepong 88'	Stadium: Roots Hall; Attendance: 5,004; Referee: Adrian Quelch

18 September 2021 7	Torquay	1–0	Southend United	Torquay
15:00 BST	Lemonheigh-Evans 90'			Stadium: Plainmoor; Attendance: 2,301; Referee: Scott Jackson

2 October 2021 8	Solihull Moors	2–0	Southend United	Solihull
15:00 BST	Shaun Hobson 29' (o.g.); Ball 54' (pen.)			Stadium: Damson Park; Attendance: 2,301; Referee: Tom Bishop

5 October 2021 9	Southend United	1–0	Easleigh	Southend-on-Sea
19:45 BST	Ferguson 69'			Stadium: Roots Hall; Attendance: 3,349; Referee: R Whitton

9 October 2021 10	Southend United	4–0	Chesterfield	Southend-on-Sea
15:00 BST			Rowe 19', 40', 73' (pen.); Khan 49'	Stadium: Roots Hall; Attendance: 4,625; Referee: S Tallis

23 October 2021 11	Dagenham & Redbridge	3–0	Southend United	Dagenham
15:00 BST	Sagaf 52'; Ling 56', 58'			Stadium: Victoria Road; Attendance: 3,673; Referee: Gary Parsons

30 October 2021 12	Boreham Wood	1–0	Southend United	Borehamwood
15:00 BST	Marsh 83'			Stadium: Meadow Park; Attendance: 1,501; Referee: Aaron Jackson

2 November 2021 13	Southend United	4–1	Dover Athletic	Southend-on-Sea
19:45 GMT	Murphy 30', 35' (pen.); Dalby 59'; Bridge 73'		Hanson 69'	Stadium: Roots Hall; Attendance: 4,996; Referee: Daniel Middleton

13 November 2021 14	Southend United	0–2	Woking	Southend-on-Sea
15:00 GMT			Campbell 22'; Kretzschmar 88' (pen.)	Stadium: Roots Hall; Attendance: 5,821; Referee: Ryan Atkin

19 November 2021 15	Grimsbey Town	1–0	Southend United	Cleethorpes
19:45 GMT	Taylor 3'			Stadium: Blundell Park; Attendance: 5,836; Referee: Jacob Miles

27 November 2021 16	Altrincham	1–2	Southend United	Altrincham
15:00 GMT	Mooney 68'		Murphy 1'; Dalby 34'	Stadium: Moss Lane; Attendance: 1,288; Referee: Adam Herczeg

7 December 2021 17	Southend United	1–1	Maidenhead United	Southend-on-Sea
19:45 GMT	Murphy 45'		Ferdinand 73'	Stadium: Roots Hall; Attendance: 4,928; Referee: Scott Tallis

11 December 2021 18	Notts County	4–1	Southend United	Nottingham
15:00 GMT	Roberts 31'; Wootton 63', 71'; Cameron 88'		Dalby 10'	Stadium: Meadow Lane; Attendance: 6,206; Referee: Garreth Rhodes

26 December 2021 19	Bromley	1–1	Southend United	Bromley
15:00 GMT	Cheek 64'		Dennis 67'	Stadium: Hayes Lane; Attendance: 3,759; Referee: Lewis Smith

8 January 2022 20	Weymouth	0–1	Southend United	Weymouth
15:00 GMT			Dennis 5'	Stadium: Bob Lucas Stadium; Attendance: 1,335; Referee: Lee Collins

11 January 2022 21	Southend United	2–1	Yeovil Town	Southend-on-Sea
19:45 GMT	Demetriou 29'; Clifford 60'		Reid 90'	Stadium: Roots Hall; Attendance: 4,845; Referee: Adrian Quelch

21 January 2022 22	Southend United	2–1	Kings Lynn Town	Southend-on-Sea
19:45 GMT	Dennis 49'; Dalby 90+3'		Phipps 27'	Stadium: Roots Hall; Attendance: 6,122; Referee: Lloyd Wood

25 January 2022 23	Aldershot	1–1	Southend United	Aldershot
19:45 GMT	Glover 5'		Cardwell 87'	Stadium: Recreation Ground; Attendance: 2,141; Referee: Aji Ajibola

29 January 2022 24	Dover Athletic	0–1	Southend United	River
15:00 GMT			Husin 72'	Stadium: Crabble Athletic Ground; Attendance: 2,657; Referee: Ryan Atkin

1 February 2022 25	Southend United	2–1	Barnet	Southend-on-Sea
19:45 GMT	Dennis 4', 27'		Marriott 36'	Stadium: Roots Hall; Attendance: 6,036; Referee: Sunny Gill

8 February 2022 26	Southend United	2–0	Bromley	Southend-on-Sea
19:45 GMT	Dennis 47'; Hobson 50'			Stadium: Roots Hall; Attendance: 8,070; Referee: Paul Johnson

12 February 2022 27	Woking	2–3	Southend United	Woking
17:30 GMT	Effiong 47', 58' (pen.)		Demetriou 8'; Powell 11'; Cardwell 76'	Stadium: Kingfield Stadium; Attendance: 3,819; Referee: Elliott Swallow

12 February 2022 28	Easleigh	1–1	Southend United	Eastleigh
17:30 GMT	Pritchard 9'		Husin 76'	Stadium: Silverlake Stadium; Attendance: 3,062; Referee: James Durkin

26 February 2022 29	Southend United	1–1	Solihull Moors	Southend-on-Sea
15:00 GMT	Dalby 31'		Maycock 44'	Stadium: Roots Hall; Attendance: 6,607; Referee: Jacob Miles

5 March 2022 30	Chesterfield	2–2	Southend United	Chesterfield
15:00 GMT	King 9'; Miller 77'		Dalby 53'; Kerr 88' (o.g.)	Stadium: Technique Stadium; Attendance: 6,626; Referee: Aaron Jackson

8 March 2022 31	Southend United	1–0	Grimsby Town	Southend-on-Sea
19:45 GMT	Dalby 62' (pen.)			Stadium: Roots Hall; Attendance: 7,205; Referee: Daniel Lamport

15 March 2022 32	Southend United	0–3	Dagenham & Redbridge	Southend-on-Sea
19:45 GMT			Atkinson 5' (o.g.); Arnold 28' (o.g.); Robinson 67'	Stadium: Roots Hall; Attendance: 7,542; Referee: Ryan Atkin

15 March 2022 33	Southend United	2–0	Altrincham	Southend-on-Sea
19:45 GMT	Ralph 35'; Dennis 41'			Stadium: Roots Hall; Attendance: 5,976; Referee: Aji Ajibola

22 March 2022 34	Maidenhead United	2–1	Southend United	Maidenhead
19:45 GMT	De Havilland 72'; Upward 82'		Clifford 63'	Stadium: York Road; Attendance: 1,624; Referee: Daniel Middleton

26 March 2022 35	Yeovil Town	2–0	Southend United	Yeovil
15:00 GMT	De Havilland 72'; Upward 82'			Stadium: Huish Park; Attendance: 2,465; Referee: Gary Parsons

2 April 2022 36	Southend United	0–3	Notts County	Southend-on-Sea
15:00 BST			Rodrigues 19', 61', 80'	Stadium: Roots Hall; Attendance: 6,338; Referee: Steven Copeland

9 April 2022 37	Stockport County	5–0	Southend United	Stockport
15:00 BST	Collar 21'; Hippolyte 25'; Madden 50', 63'; Cannon 89'			Stadium: Edgeley Park; Attendance: 7,738; Referee: Scott Simpson

15 April 2022 38	Southend United	0–1	Wealdstone	Southend-on-Sea
19:45 BST			Browne 68'	Stadium: Roots Hall; Attendance: 5,849; Referee: Tom Bishop

18 April 2022 39	Barnet	1–3	Southend United	Canons Park
19:45 BST	Marriott 62'		Cardwell 5'; Demetriou 15'; Dunne 90'	Stadium: The Hive Stadium; Attendance: 2,202; Referee: Scott Simpson

23 April 2022 40	Southend United	1–0	FC Halifax Town	Southend-on-Sea
15:00 BST	Clark 12'			Stadium: Roots Hall; Attendance: 5,620; Referee: Robert Massey-Ellis

26 April 2022 41	Southend United	1–0	Boreham Wood	Southend-on-Sea
19:45 BST	Bridge 77'			Stadium: Roots Hall; Attendance: 4,726; Referee: Scott Tallis

30 April 2022 42	Wrexham	1–0	Southend United	Wrexham
15:00 BST	Palmer 47'			Stadium: Racecourse Ground; Attendance: 9,269; Referee: Matthew Dicicco

2 May 2022 43	Southend United	1–1	Weymouth	Southend-on-Sea
19:45 BST	Powell 49'		McQuiod 40'	Stadium: Roots Hall; Attendance: 5,323; Referee: Robert Whitton

15 May 2022 44	Southend United	1–1	Torquay United	Southend-on-Sea
15:00 BST	Dunne 76'		Johnson 45+5'	Stadium: Roots Hall; Attendance: 6,294; Referee: Aaron Jackson

=== FA Cup ===
Southend entered the FA Cup at the fourth qualifying round.

Win Draw Loss

16 October 2021 Fourth qualifying round	Southend United	4–1	Chertsey Town	Southend-on-Sea
15:00 GMT	Ferguson 14'; Murphy 34'; Ralph 72'; Walsh 85'	Report	McLaren 6'	Stadium: Roots Hall; Attendance: 2,307; Referee: Callum Walchester

6 November 2021 First round	Chesterfield	3–1	Southend United	Chesterfield
15:00 GMT	Khan 6'; Croll 14'; Tshimanga 79'	Report	Murphy 4'	Stadium: Technique Stadium; Attendance: 4,713; Referee: Scott Simpson

=== FA Trophy ===
Win Draw Loss

Southend entered the FA Trophy at the third round

18 December 2021 Third round	Southend United	2–1	Dorking Wanderers	Southend-on-Sea
15:00 GMT	Dalby 41'; Dennis 74'	Report	Rutherford 5'	Stadium: Roots Hall; Attendance: 1,728; Referee: Robert Massey-Ellis

15 January 2022 Fourth round	Dagenham & Redbridge	2–0	Southend United	Dagenham
15:00 GMT	Sagaf 56'; Morias 64'	Report		Stadium: Victoria Road; Attendance: 2585; Referee: Sam Purkiss
