= 2020–21 FA Cup =

Football Association Challenge Cup

Tournament details
- Country: England; Wales
- Dates: 31 August 2020 – 15 May 2021
- Teams: 736 (all); 644 (qualifying competition); 124 (main competition)

Final positions
- Champions: Leicester City (1st title)
- Runners-up: Chelsea

Tournament statistics
- Matches played: 123
- Goals scored: 366 (2.98 per match)
- Top goal scorer(s): Tammy Abraham; Kelechi Iheanacho; Gary Madine; Alfie May; Tom Nichols (4 goals each)
- (Note: All statistics do not include qualifying play-offs)

The 2020–21 FA Cup was the 140th edition of the oldest football tournament in the world, the Football Association Challenge Cup. It was sponsored by Emirates and known as the Emirates FA Cup for sponsorship purposes. The winners qualified for the 2021–22 UEFA Europa League group stage.

Premier League side Arsenal were the defending champions, but were eliminated in the fourth round by Southampton.

Leicester City beat Chelsea 1–0 in the final to win their first FA Cup, having been runners-up on four previous occasions.

== Teams ==
The FA Cup is a knockout competition with 124 teams taking part all trying to reach the Final at Wembley in May 2021. The competition consisted of the 92 teams from the Football League system (20 teams from the Premier League and the 72 in total from the EFL Championship, EFL League One and EFL League Two) plus the 32 surviving teams out of 644 teams from the National League System (levels 5–10 of the English football league system) that started the competition in qualifying rounds.

All rounds were drawn randomly usually either at the completion of the previous round or on the evening of the last televised game of a round being played depending on television broadcasting rights.

This year's competition was subject to changes to the rules and round dates at short notice to follow the latest national and local government guidelines regarding the COVID-19 pandemic in the United Kingdom.

Round	Main date	Number of fixtures	Clubs remaining	New entries this round	Winner prize money	Loser prize money (Note: The FA announced that, while restrictions on fans attending game in person were in place as a result of the COVID-19 pandemic in the United Kingdom, the usual prize money awarded to the winners of each proper round of the FA Cup would be split 75%/25% with the losers of that round.)	Divisions entering this round
First round proper	Saturday 7 November 2020	40	124 → 84	48	£16,972	£5,657	24 EFL League One teams 24 EFL League Two teams
Second round proper	Saturday 28 November 2020	20	84 → 64	None	£25,500	£8,500	None
Third round proper	Saturday 9 January 2021	32	64 → 32	44	£61,500	£20,500	20 Premier League teams 24 EFL Championship teams
Fourth round proper	Saturday 23 January 2021	16	32 → 16	None	£90,000	None	None
Fifth round proper	Wednesday 10 February 2021	8	16 → 8	None	£180,000	None	None
Quarter-finals	Saturday 20 March 2021	4	8 → 4	None	£360,000	None	None
Semi-finals	Saturday 17 April 2021	2	4 → 2	None	£900,000	£450,000	None
Final	Saturday 15 May 2021	1	2 → 1	None	£1,800,000	£900,000	None

== Delay and scheduling ==
As a result of the COVID-19 pandemic in the United Kingdom, the previous season's competition was delayed, with the final played roughly three months late, on 1 August 2020. In a normal year, the FA Cup would start in early August, but with the previous season finishing late, the start of the 2020–21 FA Cup was also delayed to 31 August 2020.

Contrary to initial speculation that the 2020–21 FA Cup would be reduced in size, on 25 July 2020, the FA confirmed that lower league teams would be able to compete in the competition, with 737 teams accepted (out of 889 entrants), actually representing an increase of two teams on the previous season. Following the liquidation of Macclesfield Town, 736 teams ultimately entered the competition.

All eligible teams at step 5 of the National League System (and above) were accepted into the competition, with the remaining places given to clubs at step 6. In previous seasons step 6 clubs have been given access to the extra preliminary round based on their league position, but due to the cancellation of these leagues in 2019–20, the places for these teams was allocated by a random draw instead.

=== Round & draw dates and rule changes ===
Planned dates for the early qualifying rounds were released to clubs in the National League System in late July, and confirmed by the FA on 3 August 2020. With replays removed from all rounds, some qualifying rounds were scheduled for Tuesdays rather than the usual Saturday.

Phase	Round	Draw date	First match date	Ref.
Qualifying rounds	Extra preliminary round	18 August 2020	31 August 2020	
Qualifying rounds	Preliminary round	18 August 2020	12 September 2020	
Qualifying rounds	First round qualifying	14 September 2020	22 September 2020	
Qualifying rounds	Second round qualifying	25 September 2020	3 October 2020	
Qualifying rounds	Third round qualifying	5 October 2020	13 October 2020	
Qualifying rounds	Fourth round qualifying	15 October 2020	24 October 2020	
Main tournament	First round proper	26 October 2020	6 November 2020	
Main tournament	Second round proper	9 November 2020	28 November 2020	
Main tournament	Third round proper	30 November 2020	9 January 2021	
Main tournament	Fourth round proper	11 January 2021	23 January 2021	
Main tournament	Fifth round proper	11 January 2021	9 February 2021	
Main tournament	Quarter-finals	11 February 2021	20 March 2021	
Main tournament	Semi-finals	21 March 2021	17 April 2021	
Main tournament	Final	21 March 2021	15 May 2021	

== Rules changes ==
To fit into a truncated schedule for the 2020–21 season, replays were removed entirely from the competition. The prize fund was reduced, with figures returning to those last used in the 2017–18 FA Cup. While restrictions on fans attending games in person were in place, the usual prize money awarded to the winners for each round was split 75% to 25% with the losers.

== Qualifying rounds ==
All participating clubs that were not members of the Premier League or English Football League competed in the qualifying rounds to secure one of 32 available places in the first round proper. The qualifying competition began with the extra preliminary round on 31 August 2020, with the fourth and final qualifying round played on the weekend of 24 October.

The winners from the fourth qualifying round were Darlington, Skelmersdale United, Hartlepool United, Banbury United, Solihull Moors, FC United of Manchester, King's Lynn Town, South Shields, Marine, AFC Fylde, Brackley Town, Stockport County, Cray Valley Paper Mills, Hayes & Yeading United, Bromley, Tonbridge Angels, Canvey Island, Hampton & Richmond Borough, Woking, Maldon & Tiptree, Dagenham & Redbridge, Barnet, Oxford City, Eastbourne Borough, Torquay United, Havant & Waterlooville, Eastleigh, Boreham Wood, Yeovil Town, Concord Rangers and Bishop's Stortford. Chorley, having advanced through the second and third qualifying rounds, drew a bye at the final stage as a consequence of the liquidation of Macclesfield Town just after the start of the season.

Cray Valley Paper Mills was the only club in this season's tournament appearing in the competition proper for the first time, although King's Lynn Town was appearing at this stage for the first time in their own right following the dissolution of King's Lynn FC in 2009 and the latest incarnation of South Shields was featuring here for the first time since the previous club of that name relocated to Gateshead in 1974. Of the others, Canvey Island had last qualified for the first round in 2004-05, Marine had last done so in 1995–96, Banbury United had last done so in 1973-74, Tonbridge Angels had last done so in 1972-73 and Skelmersdale United had last featured at this stage in 1971-72.

== First round proper ==
The draw for the first round proper was held on 26 October 2020. The 31 winners from the fourth qualifying round joined the clubs from League One and League Two and bye recipients Chorley in 40 ties played over the weekend of 7 November. This round included one team from level 9, Skelmersdale United, the lowest ranked team left in the competition. Chesterfield were originally drawn to play at Rochdale in this round. However, due to Chesterfield fielding an ineligible player during their fourth qualifying-round match against Stockport County, the match was replayed and ultimately won by Stockport County.

6 November 2020	Harrogate Town (4)	4–1	Skelmersdale United (9)	Harrogate
19:45 GMT	Miller 1'; Beck 45+3'; Lawlor 68'; Martin 73'	Report	Mitchley 89'	Stadium: Wetherby Road; Attendance: 0 (Note: The match was played behind closed doors due to the COVID-19 pandemic in the United Kingdom.); Referee: Bobby Madley

7 November 2020	Tonbridge Angels (6)	0–7	Bradford City (4)	Tonbridge
12:30 GMT		Report	A. O'Connor 6'; Clarke 14', 44'; Donaldson 55'; Samuels 68'; Pritchard 83'; Wood 90+1'	Stadium: Longmead Stadium; Attendance: 0 Referee: James Oldham

7 November 2020	Exeter City (4)	2–1	AFC Fylde (6)	Exeter
13:00 GMT	Jay 26'; Hartridge 33'	Report	Hulme 11'	Stadium: St James Park; Attendance: 0 Referee: Tom Reeves

7 November 2020	Leyton Orient (4)	1–2	Newport County (4)	Leyton, London
15:00 GMT	Kyprianou 40'	Report	Baker 37'; Devitt 77'	Stadium: Brisbane Road; Attendance: 0 Referee: James Adcock

7 November 2020	Sunderland (3)	0–1	Mansfield Town (4)	Sunderland
15:00 GMT		Report	Lapslie 49'	Stadium: Stadium of Light; Attendance: 0 Referee: Anthony Backhouse

7 November 2020	Bolton Wanderers (4)	2–3	Crewe Alexandra (3)	Bolton
15:00 GMT	Delfouneso 37', 78'	Report	Mandron 29'; Finney 70'; Kirk 75'	Stadium: University of Bolton Stadium; Attendance: 0 Referee: Rob Lewis

7 November 2020	Oxford United (3)	1–2	Peterborough United (3)	Oxford
15:00 GMT	Ruffels 45+2'	Report	Dembélé 23'; Taylor 63'	Stadium: Kassam Stadium; Attendance: 0 Referee: Ben Speedie

7 November 2020	Walsall (4)	1–2	Bristol Rovers (3)	Walsall
15:00 GMT	Lavery 87'	Report	Baldwin 33'; Hanlan 39'	Stadium: Bescot Stadium; Attendance: 0 Referee: Ross Joyce

7 November 2020	Rochdale (3)	1–2	Stockport County (5)	Rochdale
15:00 GMT	Lund 22'	Report	Rooney 7'; Reid 14'	Stadium: Spotland Stadium; Attendance: 0 Referee: Scott Oldham

7 November 2020	Swindon Town (3)	1–2	Darlington (6)	Swindon
15:00 GMT	Pitman 41'	Report	Campbell 31', 60'	Stadium: County Ground; Attendance: 0 Referee: Declan Bourne

7 November 2020	Tranmere Rovers (4)	2–1	Accrington Stanley (3)	Birkenhead
15:00 GMT	Blackett-Taylor 13'; Clarke 84'	Report	Bishop 24'	Stadium: Prenton Park; Attendance: 0 Referee: Graham Salisbury

7 November 2020	Bromley (5)	0–1 (a.e.t.)	Yeovil Town (5)	Bromley, London
15:00 GMT		Report	Rogers 120+2'	Stadium: Hayes Lane; Attendance: 0 Referee: Anthony Coggins

7 November 2020	Cheltenham Town (4)	3–1	South Shields (7)	Cheltenham
15:00 GMT	May 12', 53'; Sercombe 62'	Report	Osei 18'	Stadium: Whaddon Road; Attendance: 0 Referee: Martin Woods

7 November 2020	Stevenage (4)	2–2 (a.e.t.) (5–4 p)	Concord Rangers (6)	Stevenage
15:00 GMT	Coker 28'; Newton 99'	Report	Wall 43'; Martin 109'	Stadium: Broadhall Way; Attendance: 0 Referee: John Busby
	Penalties
	Wildin (penalty scored); Carter (penalty scored); Osborne (penalty scored); List (penalty scored); Oteh (penalty scored)		(penalty missed) Popo; (penalty scored) Hanfrey; (penalty scored) Bridge; (penalty scored) Hughes; (penalty scored) Reynolds

7 November 2020	Gillingham (3)	3–2	Woking (5)	Gillingham
15:00 GMT	Samuel 59', 68'; Oliver 79'	Report	Kretzschmar 23'; Davison 55'	Stadium: Priestfield Stadium; Attendance: 0 Referee: Chris Sarginson

7 November 2020	Charlton Athletic (3)	0–1	Plymouth Argyle (3)	Charlton, London
15:00 GMT		Report	Jephcott 60'	Stadium: The Valley; Attendance: 0 Referee: Neil Hair

7 November 2020	Salford City (4)	2–0 (a.e.t.)	Hartlepool United (5)	Salford
15:00 GMT	Andrade 105+1'; Dieseruvwe 120+3'	Report		Stadium: Moor Lane; Attendance: 0 Referee: Carl Boyeson

7 November 2020	Hull City (3)	2–0	Fleetwood Town (3)	Kingston upon Hull
15:00 GMT	Magennis 31'; Burke 63'	Report		Stadium: KCOM Stadium; Attendance: 0 Referee: Marc Edwards

7 November 2020	Colchester United (4)	1–1 (a.e.t.) (3–5 p)	Marine (8)	Colchester
15:00 GMT	Pell 64'	Report	Miley 22'	Stadium: Colchester Community Stadium; Attendance: 0 Referee: Samuel Allison
	Penalties
	Pell (penalty scored); Chilvers (penalty scored); Brown (penalty scored); Bohui (penalty missed)		(penalty scored) Touray; (penalty scored) Hughes; (penalty scored) Kengni; (penalty scored) Raven; (penalty scored) Howard

7 November 2020	Dagenham & Redbridge (5)	3–1	Grimsby Town (4)	Dagenham, London
15:00 GMT	Wilson 10', 90+1'; Brundle 90+6' (pen.)	Report	Windsor 60' (pen.)	Stadium: Victoria Road; Attendance: 0 Referee: Craig Hicks

7 November 2020	Cambridge United (4)	0–2	Shrewsbury Town (3)	Cambridge
15:00 GMT		Report	C. Daniels 47'; Walker 89'	Stadium: Abbey Stadium; Attendance: 0 Referee: Peter Wright

7 November 2020	Brackley Town (6)	3–3 (a.e.t.) (3–2 p)	Bishop's Stortford (7)	Brackley
15:00 GMT	Ndlovu 14'; Lowe 21'; Mitford 69'	Report	Foxley 65', 87'; Richardson 72'	Stadium: St James Park; Attendance: 0 Referee: Adrian Quelch
	Penalties
	Byrne (penalty scored); Coleman (penalty scored); Armson (penalty scored); Ndlovu (penalty missed)		(penalty scored) Richardson; (penalty missed) Jones; (penalty scored) Merrifield; (penalty missed) Johnson; (penalty missed) Davidson

7 November 2020	Boreham Wood (5)	3–3 (a.e.t.) (4–3 p)	Southend United (4)	Borehamwood
15:00 GMT	Fyfield 8'; Ricketts 51'; Tshimanga 93' (pen.)	Report	Goodship 59'; Egbri 62'; Olayinka 100'	Stadium: Meadow Park; Attendance: 0 Referee: Ben Toner
	Penalties
	Coulthirst (penalty missed); Mingoia (penalty scored); Thomas (penalty scored); Tshimanga (penalty scored); Mafuta (penalty scored)		(penalty scored) Olayinka; (penalty scored) Clifford; (penalty missed) Rush; (penalty scored) Nathaniel-George; (penalty missed) Demetriou

7 November 2020	Ipswich Town (3)	2–3 (a.e.t.)	Portsmouth (3)	Ipswich
15:00 GMT	Nolan 43'; Norwood 66'	Report	Curtis 11'; Naylor 13'; Raggett 111'	Stadium: Portman Road; Attendance: 0 Referee: Andy Haines

7 November 2020	Port Vale (4)	0–1	King's Lynn Town (5)	Burslem
15:00 GMT		Report	Carey 82'	Stadium: Vale Park; Attendance: 0 Referee: David Richardson

7 November 2020	Lincoln City (3)	6–2	Forest Green Rovers (4)	Lincoln
15:00 GMT	Grant 17', 24' (pen.); Johnson 64'; Scully 78', 88'; Jones 90+2'	Report	Whitehouse 82'; Young 90+2'	Stadium: Sincil Bank; Attendance: 0 Referee: Sam Barrott

7 November 2020	Banbury United (7)	1–2	Canvey Island (8)	Banbury
15:00 GMT	Johnson 68'	Report	Hubble 23'; Ronto 71'	Stadium: Spencer Stadium; Attendance: 0 Referee: Lewis Smith

7 November 2020	FC United of Manchester (7)	1–5	Doncaster Rovers (3)	Moston, Manchester
17:30 GMT	Linney 30'	Report	Okenabirhie 13'; Whiteman 21'; Sims 33', 50'; Coppinger 42'	Stadium: Broadhurst Park; Attendance: 0 Referee: Thomas Bramall

8 November 2020	Scunthorpe United (4)	2–3	Solihull Moors (5)	Scunthorpe
12:00 GMT	McAtee 14'; Van Veen 84'	Report	Gleeson 4' (pen.), 80' (pen.); Pearce 51'	Stadium: Glanford Park; Attendance: 0 Referee: James Bell

8 November 2020	Havant & Waterlooville (6)	1–0	Cray Valley Paper Mills (8)	Havant
12:45 GMT	Gomis 18'	Report		Stadium: Westleigh Park; Attendance: 0 Referee: James Durkin

8 November 2020	Barnet (5)	1–0	Burton Albion (3)	Edgware, London
12:45 GMT	Fonguck 10'	Report		Stadium: The Hive Stadium; Attendance: 0 Referee: Trevor Kettle

8 November 2020	Wigan Athletic (3)	2–3 (a.e.t.)	Chorley (6)	Wigan
12:45 GMT	Garner 19'; James 34'	Report	Newby 48'; Cardwell 60'; Hall 92'	Stadium: DW Stadium; Attendance: 0 Referee: Martin Coy

8 November 2020	Maldon & Tiptree (8)	0–1	Morecambe (4)	Maldon
12:45 GMT		Report	Phillips 43' (pen.)	Stadium: Wallace Binder Ground; Attendance: 0 Referee: Will Finnie

8 November 2020	Torquay United (5)	5–6 (a.e.t.)	Crawley Town (4)	Torquay
12:45 GMT	Nemane 18'; Whitfield 24'; Umerah 90+18'; Hall 102' (pen.), 107' (pen.)	Report	Nichols 83' (pen.), 108', 113'; Watters 90+14'; Tunnicliffe 90+21'; Nadesan 118'	Stadium: Plainmoor; Attendance: 0 Referee: Charles Breakspear

8 November 2020	Hayes & Yeading United (7)	2–2 (a.e.t.) (3–4 p)	Carlisle United (4)	Hayes, London
12:45 GMT	Rowe 104'; Nasha 108'	Report	Mellish 118', 120+1'	Stadium: Beaconsfield Road; Attendance: 0 Referee: Ollie Yates
	Penalties
	Gafaiti (penalty scored); Williams (penalty missed); Nasha (penalty scored); Robinson (penalty missed); Rowe (penalty scored); McDevitt (penalty missed)		(penalty scored) Mellish; (penalty scored) Anderton; (penalty missed) Alessandra; (penalty scored) Tanner; (penalty missed) Kayode; (penalty scored) Reilly

8 November 2020	Eastleigh (5)	0–0 (a.e.t.) (3–4 p)	Milton Keynes Dons (3)	Eastleigh
12:45 GMT		Report		Stadium: Ten Acres; Attendance: 0 Referee: Alan Young
	Penalties
	Barnett (penalty missed); Miley (penalty scored); Tomlinson (penalty scored); Bird (penalty scored); Bearwish (penalty missed)		(penalty scored) Poole; (penalty missed) Gladwin; (penalty scored) Morris; (penalty scored) S. Walker; (penalty scored) Fraser

8 November 2020	Hampton & Richmond Borough (6)	2–3	Oldham Athletic (4)	Hampton, London
12:45 GMT	Deadfield 30' (pen.), 75'	Report	Garrity 6'; Grant 40'; Rowe 49'	Stadium: Beveree Stadium; Attendance: 0 Referee: Sam Purkiss

8 November 2020	Eastbourne Borough (6)	0–3	Blackpool (3)	Eastbourne
14:30 GMT		Report	Madine 58', 68'; Yates 90+2'	Stadium: Priory Lane; Attendance: 0 Referee: David Rock

9 November 2020	Oxford City (6)	2–1	Northampton Town (3)	Oxford
19:45 GMT	Roberts 12'; Ashby 68' (pen.)	Report	Hoskins 7'	Stadium: Marsh Lane; Attendance: 0 Referee: Paul Howard

26 November 2020 (Note: The match, originally scheduled for 7 November 2020, was postponed due to a number of AFC Wimbledon players being tested positive for COVID-19.)	Barrow (4)	0–0 (a.e.t.) (2–4 p)	AFC Wimbledon (3)	Barrow-in-Furness
19:45 GMT		Report		Stadium: Holker Street; Attendance: 0 Referee: Seb Stockbridge
	Penalties
	Angus (penalty missed); Quigley (penalty missed); Kay (penalty scored); Brough (penalty scored)		(penalty scored) Longman; (penalty scored) McLoughlin; (penalty scored) Seddon; (penalty scored) Rudoni

== Second round proper ==
The draw for the second round proper was held on 9 November 2020. The 40 winners from the first round proper competed in 20 ties played over the weekend of 28 November. This round included two teams from level 8, Canvey Island and Marine, the lowest ranked teams left in the competition.

27 November 2020	Tranmere Rovers (4)	1–0	Brackley Town (6)	Birkenhead
19:55 GMT	Woolery 67'	Report		Stadium: Prenton Park; Attendance: 0 Referee: Tom Nield

28 November 2020	Morecambe (4)	4–2 (a.e.t.)	Solihull Moors (5)	Morecambe
12:30 GMT	Stockton 53', 59'; O'Sullivan 95'; Hancox 108' (o.g.)	Report	Hudlin 19'; Cranston 69'	Stadium: Globe Arena; Attendance: 0 Referee: Benjamin Speedie

28 November 2020	Gillingham (3)	2–3	Exeter City (4)	Gillingham
13:00 GMT	Oliver 21'; Samuel 80'	Report	Law 29'; Randall 35', 40'	Stadium: Priestfield Stadium; Attendance: 0 Referee: Alan Young

28 November 2020	Newport County (4)	3–0	Salford City (4)	Newport
13:00 GMT	Proctor 56'; Amond 75' (pen.); Janneh 90+2'	Report		Stadium: Rodney Parade; Attendance: 0 Referee: Kevin Johnson

28 November 2020	Harrogate Town (4)	0–4	Blackpool (3)	Harrogate
15:00 GMT		Report	Falkingham 50' (o.g.); Ward 60'; Gabriel 85'; Kemp 90+1'	Stadium: Wetherby Road; Attendance: 0 Referee: James Oldham

28 November 2020	Plymouth Argyle (3)	2–0	Lincoln City (3)	Plymouth
15:00 GMT	Jephcott 6'; Reeves 55'	Report		Stadium: Home Park; Attendance: 0 Referee: David Rock

28 November 2020	Portsmouth (3)	6–1	King's Lynn Town (5)	Portsmouth
15:00 GMT	Nicolaisen 2'; Naylor 30'; Raggett 51'; Harness 58'; Harrison 72' (pen.); Hiwula 80'	Report	Southwell 68'	Stadium: Fratton Park; Attendance: 0 Referee: Will Finnie

28 November 2020	Cheltenham Town (4)	2–1 (a.e.t.)	Crewe Alexandra (3)	Cheltenham
15:00 GMT	Azaz 2'; Lloyd 94'	Report	Porter 63'	Stadium: Whaddon Road; Attendance: 0 Referee: James Adcock

28 November 2020	Bradford City (4)	1–2	Oldham Athletic (4)	Bradford
15:00 GMT	Donaldson 11' (pen.)	Report	McAleny 18'; Rowe 47'	Stadium: Valley Parade; Attendance: 0 Referee: Martin Coy

28 November 2020	Peterborough United (3)	1–2	Chorley (6)	Peterborough
17:30 GMT	Taylor 2'	Report	Hall 60'; Calveley 63'	Stadium: London Road Stadium; Attendance: 0 Referee: Darren Drysdale

29 November 2020	Stevenage (4)	1–1 (a.e.t.) (6–5 p)	Hull City (3)	Stevenage
13:30 GMT	List 79'	Report	Eaves 52' (pen.)	Stadium: Broadhall Way; Attendance: 0 Referee: Sam Allison
	Penalties
	Pett (penalty missed); Smith (penalty scored); List (penalty scored); Read (penalty scored); Newton (penalty scored); Vincelot (penalty scored); Coker (penalty scored)		(penalty scored) Coyle; (penalty scored) C. Jones; (penalty missed) Eaves; (penalty scored) Chadwick; (penalty scored) Lewis-Potter; (penalty scored) A. Jones; (penalty missed) McLoughlin

29 November 2020	AFC Wimbledon (3)	1–2	Crawley Town (4)	Wimbledon, London
13:30 GMT	Pigott 22'	Report	Nadesan 30'; Watters 50'	Stadium: Plough Lane; Attendance: 0 Referee: Robert Lewis

29 November 2020	Stockport County (5)	3–2 (a.e.t.)	Yeovil Town (5)	Stockport
13:30 GMT	Rooney 41' (pen.); Palmer 76'; C. Jennings 100'	Report	Warburton 2'; Wilkinson 70'	Stadium: Edgeley Park; Attendance: 0 Referee: Thomas Bramall

29 November 2020	Shrewsbury Town (3)	1–0 (a.e.t.)	Oxford City (6)	Shrewsbury
13:30 GMT	Udoh 108'	Report		Stadium: New Meadow; Attendance: 0 Referee: Christopher Pollard

29 November 2020	Mansfield Town (4)	2–1 (a.e.t.)	Dagenham & Redbridge (5)	Mansfield
13:30 GMT	Charsley 25'; Maynard 120+2'	Report	McCallum 19'	Stadium: Field Mill; Attendance: 0 Referee: Lee Swabey

29 November 2020	Carlisle United (4)	1–2	Doncaster Rovers (3)	Carlisle
13:30 GMT	Mellish 78'	Report	Whiteman 32', 40'	Stadium: Brunton Park; Attendance: 0 Referee: Scott Oldham

29 November 2020	Barnet (5)	0–1	Milton Keynes Dons (3)	Edgware, London
13:30 GMT		Report	Jerome 82'	Stadium: The Hive Stadium; Attendance: 0 Referee: Ben Toner

29 November 2020	Bristol Rovers (3)	6–0	Darlington (6)	Bristol
13:30 GMT	Daly 29'; Hare 38'; Leahy 44' (pen.), 53' (pen.); Oztumer 45+2'; Nicholson 59'	Report		Stadium: Memorial Stadium; Attendance: 0 Referee: Brett Huxtable

29 November 2020	Marine (8)	1–0 (a.e.t.)	Havant & Waterlooville (6)	Crosby
14:45 GMT	Cummins 120'	Report		Stadium: Rossett Park; Attendance: 0 Referee: Ross Joyce

30 November 2020	Canvey Island (8)	0–3	Boreham Wood (5)	Canvey Island
19:45 GMT		Report	Tshimanga 8'; Smith 28'; Rhead 83'	Stadium: Park Lane; Attendance: 0 Referee: Ollie Yates

== Third round proper ==
The draw for the third round proper was held on 30 November 2020. The 20 winners from the second round proper joined the clubs from the Premier League and EFL Championship in 32 ties played over the weekend of 9 January 2021. This round included one team from level 8, Marine, the lowest ranked team left in the competition and only the second team (after Chasetown in 2008) from that level to make the third round. Marine were drawn against Premier League club Tottenham Hotspur, representing the biggest league position gap between two teams in the competition's history.

8 January 2021	Wolverhampton Wanderers (1)	1–0	Crystal Palace (1)	Wolverhampton
19:45 GMT	Traoré 35'	Report		Stadium: Molineux Stadium; Attendance: 0 Referee: David Coote

8 January 2021	Aston Villa (1)	1–4	Liverpool (1)	Birmingham
19:45 GMT	Barry 41'	Report	Mané 4', 63'; Wijnaldum 60'; Salah 65'	Stadium: Villa Park; Attendance: 0 Referee: Craig Pawson

9 January 2021	Boreham Wood (5)	0–2	Millwall (2)	Borehamwood
12:00 GMT		Report	Zohore 31'; Hutchinson 74'	Stadium: Meadow Park; Attendance: 0 Referee: Benjamin Speedie

9 January 2021	Everton (1)	2–1 (a.e.t.)	Rotherham United (2)	Liverpool
12:00 GMT	Tosun 9'; Doucouré 93'	Report	Olosunde 56'	Stadium: Goodison Park; Attendance: 0 Referee: Stuart Attwell

9 January 2021	Luton Town (2)	1–0	Reading (2)	Luton
12:00 GMT	Moncur 30'	Report		Stadium: Kenilworth Road; Attendance: 0 Referee: Darren Bond

9 January 2021	Norwich City (2)	2–0	Coventry City (2)	Norwich
12:00 GMT	McLean 6'; Hugill 7'	Report		Stadium: Carrow Road; Attendance: 0 Referee: Darren Drysdale

9 January 2021	Nottingham Forest (2)	1–0	Cardiff City (2)	Nottingham
12:00 GMT	L. Taylor 3'	Report		Stadium: City Ground; Attendance: 0 Referee: David Webb

9 January 2021	Chorley (6)	2–0	Derby County (2)	Chorley
12:15 GMT	Hall 10'; Calveley 84'	Report		Stadium: Victory Park; Attendance: 0 Referee: Kevin Friend

9 January 2021	Blackburn Rovers (2)	0–1	Doncaster Rovers (3)	Blackburn
15:00 GMT		Report	Richards 42'	Stadium: Ewood Park; Attendance: 0 Referee: Sam Barrott

9 January 2021	Blackpool (3)	2–2 (a.e.t.) (3–2 p)	West Bromwich Albion (1)	Blackpool
15:00 GMT	Yates 40'; Madine 66'	Report	Ajayi 52'; Pereira 80' (pen.)	Stadium: Bloomfield Road; Attendance: 0 Referee: John Brooks
	Penalties
	Yates (penalty missed); Dougall (penalty scored); Husband (penalty scored); Madine (penalty scored); Kaikai (penalty missed)		(penalty scored) Grosicki; (penalty missed) Edwards; (penalty missed) Furlong; (penalty scored) Livermore; (penalty missed) Pereira

9 January 2021	Bournemouth (2)	4–1	Oldham Athletic (4)	Bournemouth (Note: Tie was reversed due to a frozen pitch at Oldham's Boundary Park.)
15:00 GMT	Brooks 43'; Riquelme 49'; King 74', 86'	Report	Bahamboula 45+1' (pen.)	Stadium: Dean Court; Attendance: 0 Referee: Andy Woolmer

9 January 2021	Bristol Rovers (3)	2–3	Sheffield United (1)	Bristol
15:00 GMT	Kilgour 21'; Ehmer 62'	Report	Day 6' (o.g.); Burke 59'; Bogle 63'	Stadium: Memorial Stadium; Attendance: 0 Referee: Keith Stroud

9 January 2021	Burnley (1)	1–1 (a.e.t.) (4–3 p)	Milton Keynes Dons (3)	Burnley
15:00 GMT	Vydra 90+4'	Report	Jerome 29'	Stadium: Turf Moor; Attendance: 0 Referee: Jon Moss
	Penalties
	Vydra (penalty missed); Lowton (penalty scored); Stephens (penalty scored); Benson (penalty scored); Bardsley (penalty scored)		(penalty scored) Poole; (penalty scored) Mason; (penalty missed) Sørensen; (penalty missed) Gladwin; (penalty scored) Fraser

9 January 2021	Exeter City (4)	0–2	Sheffield Wednesday (2)	Exeter
15:00 GMT		Report	Reach 27'; Paterson 90'	Stadium: St James Park; Attendance: 0 Referee: Dean Whitestone

9 January 2021	Queens Park Rangers (2)	0–2 (a.e.t.)	Fulham (1)	White City, London
15:00 GMT		Report	De Cordova-Reid 104'; Kebano 105+3'	Stadium: Loftus Road; Attendance: 0 Referee: Simon Hooper

9 January 2021	Stevenage (4)	0–2	Swansea City (2)	Stevenage
15:00 GMT		Report	Routledge 7'; Gyökeres 50'	Stadium: Broadhall Way; Attendance: 0 Referee: Michael Salisbury

9 January 2021	Stoke City (2)	0–4	Leicester City (1)	Stoke-on-Trent
15:00 GMT		Report	Justin 34'; Albrighton 59'; Pérez 79'; Barnes 81'	Stadium: Bet365 Stadium; Attendance: 0 Referee: Tony Harrington

9 January 2021	Wycombe Wanderers (2)	4–1	Preston North End (2)	High Wycombe
15:00 GMT	Onyedinma 3'; Jacobson 9' (pen.); Knight 25'; Samuel 82'	Report	Riis Jakobsen 43' (pen.)	Stadium: Adams Park; Attendance: 0 Referee: Matt Donohue

9 January 2021	Arsenal (1)	2–0 (a.e.t.)	Newcastle United (1)	Highbury, London
17:30 GMT	Smith Rowe 109'; Aubameyang 117'	Report		Stadium: Emirates Stadium; Attendance: 0 Referee: Chris Kavanagh

9 January 2021	Brentford (2)	2–1	Middlesbrough (2)	Brentford, London
18:00 GMT	Dervişoğlu 35'; Ghoddos 65'	Report	Folarin 48'	Stadium: Brentford Community Stadium; Attendance: 0 Referee: Tim Robinson

9 January 2021	Huddersfield Town (2)	2–3	Plymouth Argyle (3)	Huddersfield
18:00 GMT	Crichlow 4'; Rowe 32'	Report	Hardie 24'; Camará 42'; Edwards 71'	Stadium: Kirklees Stadium; Attendance: 0 Referee: Martin Coy

9 January 2021	Manchester United (1)	1–0	Watford (2)	Trafford, Greater Manchester
20:00 GMT	McTominay 5'	Report		Stadium: Old Trafford; Attendance: 0 Referee: Andrew Madley

10 January 2021	Barnsley (2)	2–0	Tranmere Rovers (4)	Barnsley
13:30 GMT	Helik 59'; Woodrow 90+5' (pen.)	Report		Stadium: Oakwell; Attendance: 0 Referee: Oliver Langford

10 January 2021	Bristol City (2)	2–1	Portsmouth (3)	Bristol
13:30 GMT	Diédhiou 19'; Martin 83'	Report	Johnson 45+1'	Stadium: Ashton Gate Stadium; Attendance: 0 Referee: Jarred Gillett

10 January 2021	Chelsea (1)	4–0	Morecambe (4)	Fulham, London
13:30 GMT	Mount 18'; Werner 44'; Hudson-Odoi 49'; Havertz 85'	Report		Stadium: Stamford Bridge; Attendance: 0 Referee: Darren England

10 January 2021	Cheltenham Town (4)	2–1 (a.e.t.)	Mansfield Town (4)	Cheltenham
13:30 GMT	May 73'; Boyle 110'	Report	McLaughlin 3'	Stadium: Whaddon Road; Attendance: 0 Referee: Tom Nield

10 January 2021	Crawley Town (4)	3–0	Leeds United (1)	Crawley
13:30 GMT	Tsaroulla 50'; Nadesan 53'; Tunnicliffe 70'	Report		Stadium: Broadfield Stadium; Attendance: 0 Referee: Peter Bankes

10 January 2021	Manchester City (1)	3–0	Birmingham City (2)	Manchester
13:30 GMT	Silva 8', 15'; Foden 33'	Report		Stadium: City of Manchester Stadium; Attendance: 0 Referee: Robert Jones

10 January 2021	Marine (8)	0–5	Tottenham Hotspur (1)	Crosby
17:00 GMT		Report	Carlos Vinícius 24', 30', 37'; Lucas 32'; Devine 60'	Stadium: Rossett Park; Attendance: 0 Referee: Michael Oliver

10 January 2021	Newport County (4)	1–1 (a.e.t.) (3–4 p)	Brighton & Hove Albion (1)	Newport
19:45 GMT	Webster 90+6' (o.g.)	Report	March 90'	Stadium: Rodney Parade; Attendance: 0 Referee: Lee Mason
	Penalties
	Sheehan (penalty missed); Demetriou (penalty missed); Labadie (penalty scored); Taylor (penalty scored); Shephard (penalty missed); Proctor (penalty scored); Bennett (penalty missed)		(penalty scored) Groß; (penalty missed) Maupay; (penalty missed) Bissouma; (penalty scored) Dunk; (penalty missed) Trossard; (penalty scored) Pröpper; (penalty scored) Webster

11 January 2021	Stockport County (5)	0–1	West Ham United (1)	Stockport
20:00 GMT		Report	Dawson 83'	Stadium: Edgeley Park; Attendance: 0 Referee: Mike Dean

19 January 2021 (Note: The match, originally scheduled for 9 January 2021, was postponed due to a number of Shrewsbury Town players being tested positive for COVID-19.)	Southampton (1)	2–0	Shrewsbury Town (3)	Southampton
20:00 GMT	N'Lundulu 16'; Ward-Prowse 89'	Report		Stadium: St Mary's Stadium; Attendance: 0 Referee: Graham Scott

== Fourth round proper ==
The draw for the fourth round proper was held on 11 January 2021 on BT Sport 1, right before the fifth round proper draw. The 32 winners from the third round proper played in 16 ties over the weekend of 23 January 2021. This round included one team from level 6, Chorley, the lowest ranked and the only non-league team left in the competition.

22 January 2021	Chorley (6)	0–1	Wolverhampton Wanderers (1)	Chorley
19:45 GMT		Report	Vitinha 12'	Stadium: Victory Park; Attendance: 0 Referee: Anthony Taylor

23 January 2021	Southampton (1)	1–0	Arsenal (1)	Southampton
12:15 GMT	Gabriel 24' (o.g.)	Report		Stadium: St Mary's Stadium; Attendance: 0 Referee: Peter Bankes

23 January 2021	Barnsley (2)	1–0	Norwich City (2)	Barnsley
15:00 GMT	Styles 56'	Report		Stadium: Oakwell; Attendance: 0 Referee: John Brooks

23 January 2021	Brighton & Hove Albion (1)	2–1	Blackpool (3)	Brighton and Hove
15:00 GMT	Bissouma 27'; Alzate 58'	Report	Madine 45+1'	Stadium: Falmer Stadium; Attendance: 0 Referee: Darren England

23 January 2021	Millwall (2)	0–3	Bristol City (2)	Bermondsey, London
15:00 GMT		Report	Diédhiou 32' (pen.); Wells 58'; Semenyo 72'	Stadium: The Den; Attendance: 0 Referee: Tony Harrington

23 January 2021	Sheffield United (1)	2–1	Plymouth Argyle (3)	Sheffield
15:00 GMT	Basham 39'; Sharp 47'	Report	Camará 75'	Stadium: Bramall Lane; Attendance: 0 Referee: Lee Mason

23 January 2021	Swansea City (2)	5–1	Nottingham Forest (2)	Swansea
15:00 GMT	Cullen 7', 67'; Grimes 29', 61' (pen.); O. Cooper 84'	Report	Knockaert 56'	Stadium: Liberty Stadium; Attendance: 0 Referee: Kevin Friend

23 January 2021	West Ham United (1)	4–0	Doncaster Rovers (3)	Stratford, London
15:00 GMT	Fornals 2'; Yarmolenko 32'; Butler 53' (o.g.); Afolayan 78'	Report		Stadium: London Stadium; Attendance: 0 Referee: Robert Jones

23 January 2021	Cheltenham Town (4)	1–3	Manchester City (1)	Cheltenham
17:30 GMT	May 59'	Report	Foden 81'; Gabriel Jesus 84'; Torres 90+4'	Stadium: Whaddon Road; Attendance: 0 Referee: Stuart Attwell

24 January 2021	Chelsea (1)	3–1	Luton Town (2)	Fulham, London
12:00 GMT	Abraham 11', 17', 74'	Report	Clark 30'	Stadium: Stamford Bridge; Attendance: 0 Referee: David Coote

24 January 2021	Brentford (2)	1–3	Leicester City (1)	Brentford, London
14:30 GMT	Sørensen 6'	Report	Ünder 46'; Tielemans 51' (pen.); Maddison 71'	Stadium: Brentford Community Stadium; Attendance: 0 Referee: Michael Oliver

24 January 2021	Fulham (1)	0–3	Burnley (1)	Fulham, London
14:30 GMT		Report	Rodriguez 31', 71' (pen.); Long 81'	Stadium: Craven Cottage; Attendance: 0 Referee: Andrew Madley

24 January 2021	Manchester United (1)	3–2	Liverpool (1)	Trafford, Greater Manchester
17:00 GMT	Greenwood 26'; Rashford 48'; Fernandes 78'	Report	Salah 18', 59'	Stadium: Old Trafford; Attendance: 0 Referee: Craig Pawson

24 January 2021	Everton (1)	3–0	Sheffield Wednesday (2)	Liverpool
20:00 GMT	Calvert-Lewin 29'; Richarlison 59'; Mina 62'	Report		Stadium: Goodison Park; Attendance: 0 Referee: Graham Scott

25 January 2021	Wycombe Wanderers (2)	1–4	Tottenham Hotspur (1)	High Wycombe
19:45 GMT	Onyedinma 25'	Report	Bale 45+2'; Winks 86'; Ndombele 87', 90+3'	Stadium: Adams Park; Attendance: 0 Referee: Jon Moss

26 January 2021 (Note: The match, originally scheduled for 23 January 2021, was postponed due to a number of Crawley Town players being tested positive for COVID-19.)	Bournemouth (2)	2–1	Crawley Town (4)	Bournemouth
19:00 GMT	Wilshere 24'; King 65'	Report	Nichols 59'	Stadium: Dean Court; Attendance: 0 Referee: Andre Marriner

== Fifth round proper ==
The draw for the fifth round proper was held on 11 January 2021 on BT Sport 1, and took place a few minutes after the fourth round proper draw. The 16 winners from the fourth round proper played in eight ties in midweek during the week commencing Monday 8 February 2021.

The round featured 12 teams from the Premier League (level 1) and four from the EFL Championship (level 2).

9 February 2021	Burnley (1)	0–2	Bournemouth (2)	Burnley
17:30 GMT		Report	Surridge 21'; Stanislas 88' (pen.)	Stadium: Turf Moor; Attendance: 0 Referee: Darren England

9 February 2021	Manchester United (1)	1–0 (a.e.t.)	West Ham United (1)	Trafford, Greater Manchester
19:30 GMT	McTominay 97'	Report		Stadium: Old Trafford; Attendance: 0 Referee: Paul Tierney

10 February 2021	Swansea City (2)	1–3	Manchester City (1)	Swansea
17:30 GMT	Whittaker 77'	Report	Walker 30'; Sterling 47'; Gabriel Jesus 50'	Stadium: Liberty Stadium; Attendance: 0 Referee: Peter Bankes

10 February 2021	Leicester City (1)	1–0	Brighton & Hove Albion (1)	Leicester
19:30 GMT	Iheanacho 90+4'	Report		Stadium: King Power Stadium; Attendance: 0 Referee: Mike Dean

10 February 2021	Sheffield United (1)	1–0	Bristol City (2)	Sheffield
19:30 GMT	Sharp 66' (pen.)	Report		Stadium: Bramall Lane; Attendance: 0 Referee: Robert Jones

10 February 2021	Everton (1)	5–4 (a.e.t.)	Tottenham Hotspur (1)	Liverpool
20:15 GMT	Calvert-Lewin 36'; Richarlison 38', 68'; Sigurðsson 43' (pen.); Bernard 97'	Report	Sánchez 3', 57'; Lamela 45+3'; Kane 83'	Stadium: Goodison Park; Attendance: 0 Referee: David Coote

11 February 2021	Wolverhampton Wanderers (1)	0–2	Southampton (1)	Wolverhampton
17:30 GMT		Report	Ings 49'; Armstrong 90'	Stadium: Molineux Stadium; Attendance: 0 Referee: Jon Moss

11 February 2021	Barnsley (2)	0–1	Chelsea (1)	Barnsley
20:00 GMT		Report	Abraham 64'	Stadium: Oakwell; Attendance: 0 Referee: Martin Atkinson

== Quarter-finals ==
The draw for the quarter-finals was held on 11 February 2021, before the match between Barnsley and Chelsea. The eight winners from the fifth round proper play in four ties played on the weekend of 20 March 2021.

The round featured seven teams from the Premier League (level 1) and one from the EFL Championship (level 2). Bournemouth were the only non-top flight team to play in this round.

20 March 2021	Bournemouth (2)	0–3	Southampton (1)	Bournemouth
12:15 GMT		Report	Djenepo 37'; Redmond 45+1', 59'	Stadium: Dean Court; Attendance: 0 Referee: Martin Atkinson

20 March 2021	Everton (1)	0–2	Manchester City (1)	Liverpool
17:30 GMT		Report	Gündoğan 84'; De Bruyne 90'	Stadium: Goodison Park; Attendance: 0 Referee: Michael Oliver

21 March 2021	Chelsea (1)	2–0	Sheffield United (1)	Fulham, London
13:30 GMT	Norwood 24' (o.g.); Ziyech 90+2'	Report		Stadium: Stamford Bridge; Attendance: 0 Referee: Andrew Madley

21 March 2021	Leicester City (1)	3–1	Manchester United (1)	Leicester
17:00 GMT	Iheanacho 24', 78'; Tielemans 52'	Report	Greenwood 38'	Stadium: King Power Stadium; Attendance: 0 Referee: Andre Marriner

== Semi-finals ==
The draw for the semi-finals was held on 21 March 2021, at half-time of the match between Leicester City and Manchester United on BBC One. The four winners from the quarter-finals played in two ties at Wembley Stadium on 17 and 18 April 2021.

The round featured four teams from the Premier League (level 1).

17 April 2021	Chelsea (1)	1–0	Manchester City (1)	Wembley, London
17:30 BST	Ziyech 55'	Report		Stadium: Wembley Stadium; Attendance: 0 Referee: Mike Dean

18 April 2021	Leicester City (1)	1–0	Southampton (1)	Wembley, London
18:30 BST	Iheanacho 55'	Report		Stadium: Wembley Stadium; Attendance: 4,000 (Note: Capped attendance as part of a pilot event trailing large crowds during the COVID-19 pandemic in the United Kingdom); Referee: Chris Kavanagh

== Final ==
15 May 2021
17:15 BST

Chelsea	0–1	Leicester City
	Report	Tielemans 63'

Wembley Stadium, London
Attendance: 20,000 (Note: Attendance was capped at 20,000 due to the COVID-19 pandemic in the United Kingdom.)
Referee: Michael Oliver (County Durham)

== Top scorers ==
Rank	Player	Club	Goals
1	(England) Tammy Abraham	Chelsea	4
1	(Nigeria) Kelechi Iheanacho	Leicester City	4
1	(England) Gary Madine	Blackpool	4
1	(England) Alfie May	Cheltenham Town	4
1	(England) Tom Nichols	Crawley Town	4
6	(England) Connor Hall	Chorley	3
6	(Norway) Joshua King	Bournemouth	3
6	(England) Jon Mellish	Carlisle United	3
6	(England) Ashley Nadesan	Crawley Town	3
6	(Brazil) Richarlison	Everton	3
6	(Egypt) Mohamed Salah	Liverpool	3
6	(England) Dominic Samuel	Gillingham	3
6	(Belgium) Youri Tielemans	Leicester City	3
6	(Brazil) Carlos Vinícius	Tottenham Hotspur	3
6	(England) Benjamin Whiteman	Doncaster Rovers	3

== Broadcasting rights ==
The domestic broadcasting rights for the competition were held by the BBC and subscription channel BT Sport. The BBC held the rights since 2014–15, while BT Sport since 2013–14. The FA Cup Final was required to be broadcast live on UK terrestrial television under the Ofcom code of protected sporting events.
A number of games per round also aired on BT Sport and BBC digital platforms, BT Sport Extra, and the FA Player. For the first time, all matches in the Third and fourth rounds Proper were aired live in the UK.
The following matches were broadcast live on UK television:

Round	Date	Teams	Kick-off	Channels	
Round	Date	Teams	Kick-off	Digital	TV
First round	6 November	Harrogate Town v Skelmersdale United	19:45	BT Sport App	BT Sport 1
First round	7 November	Tonbridge Angels v Bradford City	12:30	BT Sport App	BT Sport Extra
First round	7 November	Tonbridge Angels v Bradford City	12:30	BBC iPlayer	—N/a
First round	7 November	Ipswich Town v Portsmouth	15:00	BT Sport App	BT Sport Extra
First round	7 November	Ipswich Town v Portsmouth	15:00	BBC iPlayer	—N/a
First round	7 November	Colchester United v Marine	15:00	BBC iPlayer	—N/a
First round	7 November	Banbury United v Canvey Island	15:00	BBC iPlayer	—N/a
First round	7 November	FC United of Manchester v Doncaster Rovers	17:30	BBC iPlayer	BBC Two
First round	8 November	Havant & Waterlooville v Cray Valley Paper Mills	12:45	BBC iPlayer	—N/a
First round	8 November	Wigan Athletic v Chorley	12:45	BBC iPlayer	—N/a
First round	8 November	Torquay United v Crawley Town	12:45	BBC iPlayer	—N/a
First round	8 November	Hayes & Yeading United v Carlisle United	12:45	BBC iPlayer	—N/a
First round	8 November	Eastleigh v Milton Keynes Dons	12:45	BBC iPlayer	—N/a
First round	8 November	Maldon & Tiptree v Morecambe	12:45	BT Sport App	BT Sport Extra
First round	8 November	Maldon & Tiptree v Morecambe	12:45	BBC iPlayer	—N/a
First round	8 November	Hampton & Richmond Borough v Oldham Athletic	12:45	BT Sport App	BT Sport Extra
First round	8 November	Hampton & Richmond Borough v Oldham Athletic	12:45	BBC iPlayer	—N/a
First round	8 November	Eastbourne Borough v Blackpool	14:30	BT Sport App	BT Sport 1
First round	9 November	Oxford City v Northampton Town	19:45	BT Sport App	BT Sport 1
Second round	27 November	Tranmere Rovers v Brackley Town	19:55	BBC iPlayer	BBC Two
Second round	28 November	Morecambe v Solihull Moors	12:30	BT Sport App	BT Sport Extra
Second round	28 November	Morecambe v Solihull Moors	12:30	BBC iPlayer	BBC Red Button
Second round	28 November	Portsmouth v King's Lynn Town	15:00	BT Sport App	BT Sport Extra
Second round	28 November	Portsmouth v King's Lynn Town	15:00	BBC iPlayer	BBC Red Button
Second round	28 November	Cheltenham Town v Crewe Alexandra	15:00	BBC iPlayer	—N/a
Second round	28 November	Bradford City v Oldham Athletic	15:00	BBC iPlayer	—N/a
Second round	28 November	Peterborough United v Chorley	17:30	BT Sport App	BT Sport 2
Second round	29 November	Bristol Rovers v Darlington	13:30	BT Sport App	BT Sport Extra
Second round	29 November	Bristol Rovers v Darlington	13:30	BBC iPlayer	BBC Red Button
Second round	29 November	Shrewsbury Town v Oxford City	13:30	BT Sport App	BT Sport Extra
Second round	29 November	Shrewsbury Town v Oxford City	13:30	BBC iPlayer	—N/a
Second round	29 November	Stevenage v Hull City	13:30	BBC iPlayer	—N/a
Second round	29 November	AFC Wimbledon v Crawley Town	13:30	BBC iPlayer	—N/a
Second round	29 November	Stockport County v Yeovil Town	13:30	BBC iPlayer	—N/a
Second round	29 November	Mansfield Town v Dagenham & Redbridge	13:30	BBC iPlayer	—N/a
Second round	29 November	Carlisle United v Doncaster Rovers	13:30	BBC iPlayer	—N/a
Second round	29 November	Barnet v Milton Keynes Dons	1:30	BBC iPlayer	—N/a
Second round	29 November	Marine v Havant & Waterlooville	14:45	BT Sport App	BT Sport 1
Second round	30 November	Canvey Island v Boreham Wood	19:45	BT Sport App	BT Sport 1
Third round	8 January	Aston Villa v Liverpool	19:45	BT Sport App	BT Sport 1
Third round	8 January	Wolverhampton Wanderers v Crystal Palace	19:45	BT Sport App	BT Sport Extra
Third round	9 January	Everton v Rotherham United	12:00	BT Sport App	BT Sport Extra
Third round	9 January	Nottingham Forest v Cardiff City	12:00	BT Sport App	BT Sport Extra
Third round	9 January	Boreham Wood v Millwall	12:00	BT Sport App	BT Sport Extra
Third round	9 January	Norwich City v Coventry City	12:00	BT Sport App	BT Sport Extra
Third round	9 January	Luton Town v Reading	12:00	BT Sport App	BT Sport Extra
Third round	9 January	Chorley v Derby County	12:15	BT Sport App	BT Sport 1
Third round	9 January	Bournemouth v Oldham Athletic	15:00	BT Sport App	BT Sport Extra
Third round	9 January	Bristol Rovers v Sheffield United	15:00	BT Sport App	BT Sport Extra
Third round	9 January	Exeter City v Sheffield Wednesday	15:00	BT Sport App	BT Sport Extra
Third round	9 January	Blackpool v West Bromwich Albion	15:00	BT Sport App	BT Sport Extra
Third round	9 January	Blackburn Rovers v Doncaster Rovers	15:00	FA Player	—N/a
Third round	9 January	Wycombe Wanderers v Preston North End	15:00	FA Player	—N/a
Third round	9 January	Burnley v Milton Keynes Dons	15:00	FA Player	—N/a
Third round	9 January	Queens Park Rangers v Fulham	15:00	BBC iPlayer	—N/a
Third round	9 January	Stevenage v Swansea City	15:00	BBC iPlayer	—N/a
Third round	9 January	Stoke City v Leicester City	15:00	BBC iPlayer	BBC Red Button
Third round	9 January	Arsenal v Newcastle United	17:30	BBC iPlayer	BBC One
Third round	9 January	Huddersfield Town v Plymouth Argyle	18:00	FA Player	—N/a
Third round	9 January	Brentford v Middlesbrough	18:00	FA Player	—N/a
Third round	9 January	Manchester United v Watford	20:00	BT Sport App	BT Sport 1
Third round	9 January	~~Southampton v Shrewsbury Town~~	~~20:00~~	~~BT Sport App~~	~~BT Sport Extra~~
Third round	10 January	Barnsley v Tranmere Rovers	13:30	FA Player	—N/a
Third round	10 January	Bristol City v Portsmouth	13:30	FA Player	—N/a
Third round	10 January	Cheltenham Town v Mansfield Town	13:30	FA Player	—N/a
Third round	10 January	Manchester City v Birmingham City	13:30	BBC iPlayer	—N/a
Third round	10 January	Chelsea v Morecambe	13:30	BBC iPlayer	—N/a
Third round	10 January	Crawley Town v Leeds United	13:30	BBC iPlayer	BBC One
Third round	10 January	Marine v Tottenham Hotspur	17:00	BBC iPlayer	BBC One
Third round	10 January	Newport County v Brighton & Hove Albion	19:45	BT Sport App	BT Sport 1
Third round	11 January	Stockport County v West Ham United	20:00	BT Sport App	BT Sport 1
Third round	19 January	Southampton v Shrewsbury Town	19:45	BT Sport App	BT Sport 2
Fourth round	22 January	Chorley v Wolverhampton Wanderers	19:45	BT Sport App	BT Sport 1
Fourth round	23 January	Southampton v Arsenal	12:15	BT Sport App	BT Sport 1
Fourth round	23 January	~~Bournemouth v Crawley Town~~	~~15:00~~	~~BT Sport App~~	~~BT Sport Extra~~
Fourth round	23 January	Brighton & Hove Albion v Blackpool	15:00	BT Sport App	BT Sport Extra
Fourth round	23 January	Barnsley v Norwich City	15:00	BT Sport App	BT Sport Extra
Fourth round	23 January	Millwall v Bristol City	15:00	BT Sport App	BT Sport Extra
Fourth round	23 January	Swansea City v Nottingham Forest	15:00	BT Sport App	BT Sport Extra
Fourth round	23 January	Swansea City v Nottingham Forest	15:00	BBC iPlayer	BBC One Wales
Fourth round	23 January	West Ham United v Doncaster Rovers	15:00	BBC iPlayer	BBC Red Button
Fourth round	23 January	Sheffield United v Plymouth Argyle	15:00	BBC iPlayer	—N/a
Fourth round	23 January	Cheltenham Town v Manchester City	17:30	BBC iPlayer	BBC One
Fourth round	24 January	Chelsea v Luton Town	12:00	BBC iPlayer	BBC One
Fourth round	24 January	Brentford v Leicester City	14:30	BT Sport App	BT Sport 1
Fourth round	24 January	Fulham v Burnley	14:30	BT Sport App	BT Sport Extra
Fourth round	24 January	Manchester United v Liverpool	17:00	BBC iPlayer	BBC One
Fourth round	24 January	Everton v Sheffield Wednesday	20:00	BT Sport App	BT Sport 1
Fourth round	25 January	Wycombe Wanderers v Tottenham Hotspur	19:45	BT Sport App	BT Sport 1
Fourth round	26 January	Bournemouth v Crawley Town	19:00	BT Sport App	BT Sport Extra
Fifth round	9 February	Burnley v Bournemouth	17:30	BT Sport App	BT Sport 1
Fifth round	9 February	Manchester United v West Ham United	19:30	BBC iPlayer	BBC One
Fifth round	10 February	Swansea City v Manchester City	17:30	BT Sport App	BT Sport 1
Fifth round	10 February	Leicester City v Brighton & Hove Albion	19:30	BT Sport App	BT Sport 2
Fifth round	10 February	Sheffield United v Bristol City	19:30	BBC iPlayer	BBC Red Button
Fifth round	10 February	Everton v Tottenham Hotspur	20:15	BT Sport App	BT Sport 1
Fifth round	11 February	Wolverhampton Wanderers v Southampton	17:30	BT Sport App	BT Sport 1
Fifth round	11 February	Barnsley v Chelsea	20:00	BBC iPlayer	BBC One
Quarter-finals	20 March	Bournemouth v Southampton	12:15	BT Sport App	BT Sport 1
Quarter-finals	20 March	Everton v Manchester City	17:30	BT Sport App	BT Sport 1
Quarter-finals	21 March	Chelsea v Sheffield United	13:30	BBC iPlayer	BBC One
Quarter-finals	21 March	Leicester City v Manchester United	17:00	BBC iPlayer	BBC One
Semi-finals	17 April	Leicester City v Southampton	17:30	BT Sport App	BT Sport 1
Semi-finals	18 April	Chelsea v Manchester City	18:30	BBC iPlayer	BBC One
Final	15 May	Chelsea v Leicester City	17:15	BBC iPlayer	BBC One
Final	15 May	Chelsea v Leicester City	17:15	BT Sport App	BT Sport 1

== Prize fund ==
Round	Fate	Number of teams	Amount
Extra preliminary round	Losers	184	£375
Extra preliminary round	Winners	184	£1,125
Preliminary round	Losers	160	£481
Preliminary round	Winners	160	£1,444
First round qualifying	Losers	117	£750
First round qualifying	Winners	117	£2,250
Second round qualifying	Losers	80	£1,125
Second round qualifying	Winners	80	£3,375
Third round qualifying	Losers	40	£1,875
Third round qualifying	Winners	40	£5,625
Fourth round qualifying	Losers	32	£3,125
Fourth round qualifying	Winners	32	£9,375
First round proper	Losers	40	£5,657
First round proper	Winners	40	£16,972
Second round proper	Losers	20	£8,500
Second round proper	Winners	20	£25,500
Third round proper	Losers	32	£20,500
Third round proper	Winners	32	£61,500
Fourth round proper	Losers	16	£22,500
Fourth round proper	Winners	16	£67,500
Fifth round proper	Losers	8	£45,000
Fifth round proper	Winners	8	£135,000
Quarter-finals	Losers	4	£180,000
Quarter-finals	Winners	4	£360,000
Semi-finals	Losers	2	£450,000
Semi-finals	Winners	2	£900,000
Final	Runners-up	1	£900,000
Final	Winners	1	£1,800,000
Sources: The FA
