= Lewis Gard =

English footballer (born 1999)

Personal information
- Full name: Lewis Thomas Gard
- Date of birth: 26 August 1999 (age 27)
- Place of birth: Brentwood, England
- Position: Midfielder

Team information
- Current team: Welling United

Youth career
- 2007–2017: Southend United

Senior career*
Years	Team	Apps	(Gls)
2017–2022	Southend United	12	(1)
2017–2018	→ Aveley (loan)	12	(1)
2021	→ Heybridge Swifts (loan)	10	(2)
2022–2024	Tonbridge Angels	82	(12)
2024–2026	Ramsgate	50	(1)
2026–	Welling United	0	(0)
- * Club domestic league appearances and goals as of 10:54, 14 February 2026 (UTC)

Lewis Thomas Gard (born 26 August 1999) is an English professional footballer who plays as a midfielder for Isthmian League Premier Division club Welling United.

== Career ==
=== Youth and Southend ===
Born in Basildon, Essex, Gard grew up in Langdon Hills and attended St Thomas More High School for Boys in Westcliff-on-Sea. He started his career in the youth system at Southend United who he joined at the age of eight. After progressing through the youth team he signed a scholarship in June 2015.

==== Aveley (loan) ====
In December 2017 he joined Isthmian League North Division side Aveley on loan and made twelve appearances and scored twice during his month loan spell.

=== Southend United Senior Team ===
Upon his return he made his Southend first team debut on 24 April 2018 in a 3–0 win over Oldham Athletic when he replaced Theo Robinson as a late substitute.

On 30 September 2021, he was sent out on loan to Isthmian League Division One North side Heybridge Swifts.

=== Tonbridge Angels ===
On 10 June 2022, Gard joined National League South club Tonbridge Angels.

=== Ramsgate ===
In July 2024, Gard joined Isthmian League South East Division side Ramsgate.

He departed the club in February 2026.

=== Welling United ===
On 13 February 2026, Gard joined Isthmian League Premier Division club Welling United.

== Career statistics ==
As of end of 2021–22 season

Appearances and goals by club, season and competition
Club	Season	League			FA Cup		League Cup		Other		Total	
Club	Season	Division	Apps	Goals	Apps	Goals	Apps	Goals	Apps	Goals	Apps	Goals
Southend United	2017–18	League One	2	0	0	0	0	0	0	0	2	0
Southend United	2018–19	League One	0	0	0	0	0	0	2 (Note: Appearance(s) in the Football League Trophy)	0	2	0
Southend United	2019–20	League One	2	1	0	0	0	0	0	0	2	1
Southend United	2020–21	League Two	3	0	0	0	1	0	2	0	6	0
Southend United	2021–22	National League	5	0	0	0	—		2 (Note: Appearance(s) in FA Trophy)	0	7	0
Southend United	Total		12	1	0	0	1	0	6	0	19	1
Aveley (loan)	2017–18	IL North Division	12	1	0	0	—		0	0	12	1
Heybridge Swifts (loan)	2021–22	Isthmian League North Division	10	2	0	0	—		0	0	10	2
Ramsgate	2024–25	Isthmian League South East Division	37	0	4	1	—		4 (Note: Three appearances and two goals in FA Trophy, one appearance in Kent Senior Cup)	2	45	3
Ramsgate	2025–26	Isthmian League Premier Division	13	1	0	0	—		3 (Note: One appearance in FA Trophy, two appearances and one goal in Alan Turvey Trophy)	1	16	2
Ramsgate	Total		50	1	4	1	0	0	7	3	61	5
Career total			84	5	4	1	1	0	13	3	102	9

== Honours ==
Ramsgate

- Isthmian League South East Division: 2024–25
