= 2020–21 Southend United F.C. season =

Southend United
2020–21 season
- Chairman: Ron Martin
- Manager: Mark Molesley (until 9 April); Phil Brown (since 9 April)
- Stadium: Roots Hall
- League Two: 23rd (relegated)
- FA Cup: First round
- EFL Cup: First round
- EFL Trophy: Group stage
- Top goalscorer: League: Tom Clifford; Timothée Dieng (3 goals); All: Tom Clifford; Timothée Dieng; James Olayinka (3 goals)
Home colours	Away colours

The 2020–21 Southend United F.C. season is the club's 115th season in their history and the first season in EFL League Two following their relegation. Along with League Two, the club will also participate in the FA Cup, EFL Cup and EFL Trophy.

The season covers the period from 1 July 2020 to 30 June 2021.

== Transfers ==
=== Transfers in ===
Date	Position	Nationality	Name	From	Fee	Ref.
5 September 2020	CB	(England)	Shaun Hobson	(England) AFC Bournemouth	Free transfer	
17 September 2020	CF	(Nigeria)	Simeon Akinola	(England) Barnet	Free transfer	
17 September 2020	DM	(Republic of Ireland)	Alan McCormack	(England) Northampton Town	Free transfer	
5 October 2020	LM	(England)	Ashley Nathaniel-George	(England) Crawley Town	Undisclosed	
11 November 2020	LB	(England)	Sam Hart	(England) Blackburn Rovers	Free transfer	
15 December 2020	CB	(England)	Greg Halford	Free agent	—N/a	
26 December 2020	MF	(England)	Louis Walsh	(England) Nottingham Forest	Free transfer	
28 January 2021	CM	(England)	Nathan Ferguson	(England) Crawley Town	Undisclosed	
1 February 2021	CM	(England)	Jacob Mellis	(England) Gillingham	Undisclosed	
18 February 2021	LW	(England)	Ricky Holmes	(England) Northampton Town	Free transfer	
18 February 2021	CF	(England)	Nile Ranger	(England) Spalding United	Free transfer	

=== Loans in ===
Date from	Position	Nationality	Name	From	Date until	Ref.
20 August 2020	RW	(England)	Jordan Green	(England) Barnsley	8 October 2020 (Note: Loan cut short due to an ankle injury.)	
25 September 2020	CM	(England)	Kyle Taylor	(England) AFC Bournemouth	1 January 2021	
9 October 2020	CF	(England)	Kazaiah Sterling	(England) Tottenham Hotspur	4 January 2021	
17 October 2020	CM	(England)	James Olayinka	(England) Arsenal	27 January 2021	
7 January 2021	CF	(England)	Reeco Hackett-Fairchild	(England) Portsmouth	End of season	
25 January 2021	CB	(England)	Tyler Cordner	(England) Bournemouth	End of season	
27 February 2021	GK	(England)	Alex Bass	(England) Portsmouth	6 March 2021	
2 March 2021	GK	(England)	James Montgomery	(England) Gateshead	16 March 2021	

=== Loans out ===
Date from	Position	Nationality	Name	To	Date until	Ref.
23 October 2020	CB	(Cyprus)	Harry Kyprianou	(England) Bromley	2 January 2021	
26 February 2021	CB	(England)	Richard Taylor	(England) Barnet	End of season	

=== Transfers out ===
Date	Position	Nationality	Name	To	Fee	Ref.
1 July 2020	MF	(England)	Henry Burnett	(England) Crawley Town	Released	
1 July 2020	CM	(England)	Luke Hyam	Unattached	Released	
1 July 2020	CM	(England)	Sam Mantom	(England) Rushall Olympic	Released	
1 July 2020	DM	(Australia)	Mark Milligan	(Australia) Macarthur	Released	
1 July 2020	CF	(Jamaica)	Theo Robinson	(England) Port Vale	Released	
2 July 2020	CB	(Republic of Ireland)	Joe Shaughnessy	(Scotland) St Mirren	Released	
22 August 2020	LM	(England)	Sam Barratt	(England) Maidenhead United	Released	
26 August 2020	LM	(Republic of Ireland)	Stephen McLaughlin	(England) Mansfield Town	Rejected contract	
11 September 2020	CF	(England)	Stephen Humphrys	(England) Rochdale	Undisclosed	
2 October 2020	LW	(England)	Isaac Hutchinson	(England) Derby County	Undisclosed	
14 October 2020	CF	(United States)	Charlie Kelman	(England) Queens Park Rangers	Undisclosed	

== Pre-season ==
29 August 2020 Friendly	Southend United	0–3	Millwall	Southend-on-Sea
14:00 BST		Report	Leonard 6'; Thompson 35'; Parrott 57'	Stadium: Roots Hall; Attendance: 0

== Competitions ==
=== EFL League Two ===
==== League table ====
Pos	Team	Pld	W	D	L	GF	GA	GD	Pts	Promotion, qualification or relegation
17	Harrogate Town	46	16	9	21	52	61	−9	57	
18	Oldham Athletic	46	15	9	22	72	81	−9	54	
19	Walsall	46	11	20	15	45	53	−8	53	
20	Colchester United	46	11	18	17	44	61	−17	51	
21	Barrow	46	13	11	22	53	59	−6	50	
22	Scunthorpe United	46	13	9	24	41	64	−23	48	
23	Southend United (R)	46	10	15	21	29	58	−29	45	Relegation to National League
24	Grimsby Town (R)	46	10	13	23	37	69	−32	43	Relegation to National League

Updated to match(es) played on 31 May 2021. Source: EFL Official Website
Rules for classification: 1) Points; 2) Goal difference; 3) Number of goals scored; 4) Head-to-head results; 5) Wins; 6) Away goals; 7) Penalty points (sec 9.5); 8) 12-point sending off offences
(R) Relegated

==== Results summary ====
Overall								Home						Away					
Pld	W	D	L	GF	GA	GD	Pts	W	D	L	GF	GA	GD	W	D	L	GF	GA	GD
46	10	15	21	29	60	−31	45	5	6	12	17	30	−13	5	9	9	12	30	−18

Last updated: 8 May 2021.
Source: BBC

==== Results by matchday ====
Matchday	1	2	3	4	5	6	7	8	9	10	11	12	13	14	15	16	17	18	19	20	21	22	23	24	25	26	27	28	29	30	31	32	33	34	35	36	37	38	39	40	41	42	43	44	45	46
Ground	H	A	H	A	H	H	A	A	H	H	A	A	H	A	A	H	H	A	H	A	H	A	H	H	H	A	A	A	H	A	H	A	A	H	H	A	H	A	H	A	H	A	A	H	A	H
Result	L	L	L	D	D	L	L	L	L	L	L	W	L	L	D	W	W	D	W	L	W	D	L	L	L	L	W	D	L	W	D	L	D	L	D	D	D	W	L	D	D	D	L	W	W	D
Position	24	24	24	23	22	24	24	24	24	24	24	24	24	24	24	24	24	24	23	24	24	24	24	24	24	24	23	22	22	22	22	22	23	23	23	23	23	23	23	23	23	23	23	23	23	23

Updated to match(es) played on 8 May 2021. Source: 11v11 for league tables and fixtures
A = Away; H = Home; W = Win; D = Draw; L = Loss

==== Matches ====
Win Draw Loss Postponed

The 2020/21 season fixtures were released on 21 August.

12 September 2020 1	Southend United	0–4	Harrogate Town	Southend-on-Sea
15:00 BST	Taylor (yellow card) 7'; Hutchinson (yellow card) 90+3'	Report	Muldoon 25', 69'; Kerry 44'; Martin (yellow card) 46' (goal) 60'	Stadium: Roots Hall; Attendance: 0 Referee: Antony Coggins

19 September 2020 2	Carlisle United	2–0	Southend United	Carlisle
13:00 BST	Anderton (yellow card) 16'; Patrick 36'; Kayode 39'	Report		Stadium: Brunton Park; Attendance: 1,000; Referee: Graham Salisbury

26 September 2020 3	Southend United	1–2	Morecambe	Southend-on-Sea
15:00 BST	Gibson 5' (o.g.); Taylor (yellow card) 15'; Demetriou (yellow card) 37'	Report	Phillips (yellow card) 33' (goal) 73'; Kenyon (yellow card) 37'; Wildig 55'	Stadium: Roots Hall; Attendance: 0 Referee: Charles Breakspear

3 October 2020 4	Crawley Town	1–1	Southend United	Crawley
15:00 BST	Nadesan 21'; Craig (yellow card) 90+4'	Report	Ralph 84'	Stadium: The People's Pension Stadium; Attendance: 0 Referee: Brett Huxtable

10 October 2020 5	Southend United	2–2	Exeter City	Southend-on-Sea
15:00 BST	Goodship 26'; Demetriou 65' (pen.)	Report	Randall 40'; Fisher 90+5'	Stadium: Roots Hall; Attendance: 0 Referee: Kevin Johnson

17 October 2020 6	Southend United	0–2	Cheltenham Town	Southend-on-Sea
15:00 BST	Demetriou (yellow card) 67'	Report	Sercombe 10' (pen.); Lloyd 52'	Stadium: Roots Hall; Attendance: 0 Referee: James Oldham

20 October 2020 7	Salford City	3–0	Southend United	Salford
19:45 BST	Lennon 26' (o.g.); Clarke (yellow card) 50'; Wilson 58'; Henderson 63'; Thomas-Asante (yellow card) 71'	Report	Olayinka (yellow card) 27'; Dieng (yellow card) 43'; Lennon (yellow card) 45+1'; Taylor (yellow card) 81'; Demetriou (yellow card) 90+1'	Stadium: Moor Lane; Attendance: 0 Referee: Carl Boyeson

24 October 2020 8	Tranmere Rovers	2–0	Southend United	Birkenhead
15:00 BST	Clarke 31'; Vaughan 52' (yellow card) 83'	Report		Stadium: Prenton Park; Attendance: 0 Referee: Andy Woolmer

27 October 2020 9	Southend United	1–2	Oldham Athletic	Southend-on-Sea
19:00 GMT	Clifford 76'	Report	Grant 49'; Piergianni (yellow card) 74'; Dearnley 89'; Clarke (yellow card) 90+4'	Stadium: Roots Hall; Attendance: 0 Referee: Chris Sarginson

31 October 2020 10	Southend United	0–2	Port Vale	Southend-on-Sea
15:00 GMT	Lennon (yellow card) 85'	Report	Legge (yellow card) 22'; Pope 48', 64'; Clark (yellow card) 83'	Stadium: Roots Hall; Attendance: 0 Referee: Tom Nield

3 November 2020 11	Bradford City	3–0	Southend United	Bradford
19:00 GMT	Cooke 5'; Watt 33'; Pritchard 43' (yellow card) 80'; Donaldson (yellow card) 77'	Report	Demetriou (yellow card) 43'; Acquah (yellow card) 54'; Dieng (yellow card) 90'	Stadium: Utilita Energy Stadium; Attendance: 0 Referee: Marc Edwards

14 November 2020 12	Walsall	0–1	Southend United	Bescot
15:00 GMT	Bates (yellow card) 83' (yellow-red card) 90+3'	Report	Lennon (yellow card) 43'; Acquah 88'	Stadium: Banks's Stadium; Attendance: 0 Referee: Craig Hicks

24 November 2020 13	Southend United	0–1	Forest Green Rovers	Southend-on-Sea
19:00 GMT	Dieng (yellow card) 62'; McCormack (yellow card) 88'	Report	Young 63'	Stadium: Roots Hall; Attendance: 0 Referee: Keith Stroud

28 November 2020 14	Bolton Wanderers	3–0	Southend United	Bolton
15:00 BST	Delfouneso 45+1'; Sarcevic (yellow card) 53'; Doyle 65' (pen.), 81'; White (yellow card) 79'	Report		Stadium: University of Bolton Stadium; Attendance: 0 Referee: John Busby

5 December 2020 15	Stevenage	0–0	Southend United	Stevenage
15:00 GMT	Newton (yellow card) 57'	Report	Taylor (yellow card) 68'; Olayinka (yellow card) 74'	Stadium: Lamex Stadium; Attendance: 0 Referee: Declan Bourne

12 December 2020 16	Southend United	1–0	Scunthorpe United	Southend-on-Sea
15:00 GMT	Olayinka 80'	Report		Stadium: Roots Hall; Attendance: 2,000; Referee: Stephen Martin

15 December 2020 17	Southend United	3–1	Grimsby Town	Southend-on-Sea
19:45 GMT	Taylor 1'; Clifford 57'; Halford 75'; Egbri (yellow card) 89'	Report	Jackson Jr 45+4'; Hewitt (yellow card) 68'; Waterfall (yellow card) 73' (yellow-red card) 90+4'	Stadium: Roots Hall; Attendance: 0 Referee: Sam Allison

19 December 2020 18	Mansfield Town	1–1	Southend United	Mansfield
15:00 GMT	Clarke (yellow card) 56'; Cook (yellow card) 77'; Bowery 79'	Report	Olayinka 27'; Egbri (yellow card) 65'; Klass (yellow card) 72'; Taylor (yellow card) 78'	Stadium: One Call Stadium; Attendance: 0 Referee: Brett Huxtable

26 December 2020 19	Southend United	2–0	Colchester United	Southend-on-Sea
13:00 GMT	Akinola 10'; Hart (yellow card) 17'; Dieng 22'; Hobson (yellow card) 90+6'	Report	Eastman (yellow card) 43'; Senior (yellow card) 59'; Chilvers (yellow card) 90+6'; Lapslie (yellow card) 90+6'	Stadium: Roots Hall; Attendance: 0 Referee: Neil Hair

29 December 2020 20	Leyton Orient	2–0	Southend United	Leyton
19:00 GMT	McAnuff 53'; Wilkinson 78'; Angol (yellow card) 90'; Johnson (yellow card) 90+1'	Report	Dieng (yellow card) 52'; Bwomono (yellow card) 53'	Stadium: Breyer Group Stadium; Attendance: 0 Referee: Craig Hicks

9 January 2021 21	Southend United	1–0	Barrow	Southend-on-Sea
15:00 GMT	Hackett-Fairchild 3'; Halford (yellow card) 17' (yellow-red card) 52'; Oxley (yellow card) 79'	Report	Hird (yellow card) 54'; Kay (yellow card) 83'	Stadium: Roots Hall; Attendance: 0 Referee: Christopher Pollard

16 January 2021 22	Grimsby Town	0–0	Southend United	Cleethorpes
15:00 GMT	Habergham (yellow card) 71'; Spokes (yellow card) 90+1'	Report	McCormack (yellow card) 74'; White (yellow card) 75'; Demetriou (yellow card) 90+4'	Stadium: Blundell Park; Attendance: 0 Referee: Ben Toner

19 January 2021 23	Southend United	1–2	Cambridge United	Southend-on-Sea
19:00 GMT	Akinola 27'; Hart (yellow card) 40'; Oxley (yellow card) 90+6'	Report	Digby (yellow card) 40'; Iredale 46'; Ironside 68'	Stadium: Roots Hall; Attendance: 0 Referee: Bobby Madley

23 January 2021 24	Southend United	0–1	Mansfield Town	Southend-on-Sea
15:00 GMT	Dieng (yellow card) 54' (yellow-red card) 84'; Hart (yellow card) 78'	Report	Reid 64'; Quinn (yellow card) 70'	Stadium: Roots Hall; Attendance: 0 Referee: Ben Speedie

26 January 2021 25	Southend United	1–3	Bradford City	Southend-on-Sea
19:00 GMT	Bwomono 31'; Cordner (yellow card) 37'	Report	Evans 23', 74'; Rowe 57'	Stadium: Roots Hall; Attendance: 0 Referee: Trevor Kettle

30 January 2021 26	Port Vale	5–1	Southend United	Burslem
15:00 GMT	Rodney 1', 45+2'; Cordner 20' (o.g.); Crookes 27'; Oyeleke 89'	Report	Demetriou (yellow card) 23'; Nathaniel-George (yellow card) 67'; Ferguson 85'; Hobson (yellow card) 90+3'	Stadium: Vale Park; Attendance: 0 Referee: Carl Brook

9 February 2021 27	Newport County	0–1	Southend United	Newport
19:00 GMT		Report	Clifford 74'	Stadium: Rodney Parade; Attendance: 0 Referee: Paul Howard

13 February 2021 28	Cambridge United	0–0	Southend United	Cambridge
15:00 GMT	May (yellow card) 41'; Okedina (yellow card) 85'			Stadium: Abbey Stadium; Attendance: 0 Referee: Ross Joyce

20 February 2021 29	Southend United	0–1	Bolton Wanderers	Southend-on-Sea
15:00 GMT	Ferguson (yellow card) 32'; Bwomono (yellow card) 83'	Report	Williams (yellow card) 75'; Miller 82'; John (yellow card) 85'	Stadium: Roots Hall; Attendance: 0 Referee: Declan Bourne

24 February 2021 30	Forest Green Rovers	1–3	Southend United	Nailsworth
18:00 GMT	Moore-Taylor (yellow card) 35'; Wagstaff (yellow card) 82'; Matt 86'	Report	Hobson 20', (yellow card) 51'; Dieng 55'; Bwomono (yellow card) 67'; Ferguson 70'	Stadium: The Innocent [Insert Name Here] Stadium; Attendance: 0 Referee: Lee Swabey

27 February 2021 31	Southend United	0–0	Salford City	Southend-on-Sea
15:00 GMT	Hackett-Fairchild (yellow card) 14'; McCormack (yellow card) 79'	Report	Gotts (yellow card) 61'	Stadium: Roots Hall; Attendance: 0 Referee: Dean Whitestone

2 March 2021 32	Cheltenham Town	1–0	Southend United	Cheltenham
19:00 GMT	Thomas 53' (pen.)	Report		Stadium: Whaddon Road Ground; Attendance: 0 Referee: Will Finnie

6 March 2021 33	Oldham Athletic	0–0	Southend United	Oldham
15:00 GMT		Report	Demetriou (yellow card) 88'	Stadium: Boundary Park; Attendance: 0 Referee: Ollie Yates

9 March 2021 34	Southend United	0–2	Tranmere Rovers	Southend-on-Sea
19:00 GMT	White (yellow card) 55'; Hackett-Fairchild (yellow card) 86'	Report	Lewis 8'; Ray 24'	Stadium: Roots Hall; Attendance: 0 Referee: Tim Robinson

13 March 2021 35	Southend United	0–0	Stevenage	Southend-on-Sea
15:00 GMT	McCormack (yellow card) 66'; Demetriou (yellow card) 77'; Hackett-Fairchild (yellow card) 81'	Report	Prosser (yellow card) 45+4'	Stadium: Roots Hall; Attendance: 0 Referee: Peter Wright

20 March 2021 36	Scunthorpe United	1–1	Southend United	Scunthorpe
15:00 GMT	Karacan (yellow card) 75'; Clarke (red card) 78'; Beestin 90'	Report	Hart (yellow card) 62'; Dieng (yellow card) 67'; Nathaniel-George 79' (pen.)	Stadium: Sands Venue Stadium; Attendance: 0 Referee: Robert Lewis

23 March 2021 37	Southend United	0–0	Walsall	Southend-on-Sea
19:00 GMT	McCormack (yellow card) 4'; White (yellow card) 36'; Hart (red card) 67'	Report	Gordon (yellow card) 31'; Lavery (yellow card) 36'; Clarke (yellow card) 82'; Leak (yellow card) 83'; Osei (yellow card) 90'	Stadium: Roots Hall; Attendance: 0 Referee: David Rock

27 March 2021 38	Harrogate Town	0–1	Southend United	Harrogate
15:00 GMT	Hall (yellow card) 87'	Report	Demetriou (yellow card) 44'; Hobson (yellow card) 67'; Nathaniel-George 69', (yellow card) 90+2'	Stadium: The EnviroVent Stadium; Attendance: 0 Referee: Leigh Doughty

3 April 2021 39	Southend United	0–2	Carlisle United	Southend-on-Sea
13:00 BST	Akinola (penalty missed) 38'; Taylor (yellow card) 38'	Report	Zanzala 17'; McDonald (yellow card) 31'; Touré 79'	Stadium: Roots Hall; Attendance: 0 Referee: Alan Young

6 April 2021 40	Morecambe	1–1	Southend United	Morecambe
18:30 BST	Stockton 56'	Report	Dieng 18'; Dimitriou (yellow card) 68'	Stadium: Mazuma Stadium; Attendance: 0 Referee: Scott Oldham

10 April 2021 41	Southend United	0–0	Crawley Town	Southend-on-Sea
15:00 BST	Halford (yellow card) 49'; Demetriou (yellow card) 70'; Clifford (yellow card) 76'	Report		Stadium: Roots Hall; Attendance: 0 Referee: Charles Breakspear

17 April 2021 42	Exeter City	0–0	Southend United	Exeter
12:30 BST	Page (yellow card) 45'; Willmott (yellow card) 74'	Report	Walsh (yellow card) 38'	Stadium: St James Park; Attendance: 0 Referee: Darren Drysdale

20 April 2021 43	Colchester United	2–0	Southend United	Colchester
19:00 BST	Folivi 30'; Pell 37'; Harriott (yellow card) 49'	Report	Demetriou (red card) 69'; White (yellow card) 75'; Cordner (yellow card) 90+1'; Halford (yellow card) 90+3'	Stadium: JobServe Community Stadium; Attendance: 0 Referee: Kevin Johnson

24 April 2021 44	Southend United	2–1	Leyton Orient	Southend-on-Sea
15:00 BST	Cordner 42', (yellow card) 83'; Rush 76'; Hart (yellow card) 80'; Walsh (yellow card) 82'	Report	Dennis 45+3'	Stadium: Roots Hall; Attendance: 0 Referee: Trevor Kettle

1 May 2021 45	Barrow	1–2	Southend United	Barrow-in-Furness
15:00 BST	Quigley 19'; Kay (yellow card) 29'; Thomas (yellow card) 61'; Ntlhe (yellow card) 65'; Andrew (yellow card) 79'; Brown (yellow card) 90+5'	Report	White 30'; Cordner (yellow card) 40'; Hart (yellow card) 45'; Egbri 52'	Stadium: Furness Building Society Stadium; Attendance: 0 Referee: Martin Coy

8 May 2021 46	Southend United	1–1	Newport County	Southend-on-Sea
15:00 BST	Hobson 11', (yellow card) 51'; Halford (yellow card) 41'; Rush (penalty missed) 61'	Report	Demetriou 56'	Stadium: Roots Hall; Attendance: 0 Referee: John Brooks

=== FA Cup ===
The draw for the first round was made on Monday 26, October.

Win Draw Loss

8 November 2020 First round	Boreham Wood	3–3 (a.e.t.) (4–3 p)	Southend United	Borehamwood
15:00 GMT	Fyfield 8'; Ricketts 51'; Ilesanmi (yellow card) 53'; Rhead (yellow card) 73'; Mafuta (yellow card) 76'; Tshimanga 93' (pen.); Ashmore (yellow card) 96'; Thomas (yellow card) 104'	Report	Goodship 59'; Egbri 63'; Olayinka 100'	Stadium: Meadow Park; Attendance: 0 Referee: Ben Toner
	Penalties
	Coulthirst (penalty missed); Mingoia (penalty scored); Thomas (penalty scored); Tshimanga (penalty scored); Mafuta (penalty scored)		Olayinka (penalty scored); Clifford (penalty scored); Rush (penalty missed); Nathaniel-George (penalty scored); Demetriou (penalty missed)

=== EFL Cup ===
Win Draw Loss

The first round draw was made on 18 August, live on Sky Sports, by Paul Merson.

5 September 2020 First round	Gillingham	1–0	Southend United	Gillingham
13:00 BST	Ogilvie 27'; Jackson (yellow card) 40' (yellow-red card) 58'; O'Keefe (yellow card) 60'	Report	Hobson (yellow card) 25'; White (yellow card) 47'; Hutchinson (yellow card) 56'	Stadium: Priestfield Stadium; Attendance: 0 Referee: Christopher Pollard

=== EFL Trophy ===
Win Draw Loss

The regional group stage draw was confirmed on 18 August.

Pos	Div	Team	Pld	W	PW	PL	L	GF	GA	GD	Pts	Qualification
1	ACA	West Ham United U21	3	3	0	0	0	5	1	+4	9	Advance to Round 2
2	L1	Portsmouth	3	2	0	0	1	5	1	+4	6	Advance to Round 2
3	L2	Colchester United	3	1	0	0	2	6	4	+2	3	
4	L2	Southend United	3	0	0	0	3	2	12	−10	0	

Source: EFL.com

8 September 2020 Group stage	Southend United	1–3	West Ham United U21	Southend-on-Sea
17300 BST	Humphrys 13' (penalty missed) 35'	Report	Odubeko 2', 84'; Ashby (yellow card) 63'; Costa Da Rose (yellow card) 71'; Coventry 90+1'	Stadium: Roots Hall; Attendance: 0 Referee: David Rock

6 October 2020 Group stage	Southend United	0–3	Portsmouth	Southend-on-Sea
19:45 BST	Rush (yellow card) 35'; Coker (yellow card) 59'; Taylor (yellow card) 84'	Report	Marquis 21' (pen.); Curtis 40', 77'; Bolton (yellow card) 78'	Stadium: Roots Hall; Attendance: 0 Referee: Paul Howard

10 November 2020 Group stage	Colchester United	6–1	Southend United	Colchester
19:00 GMT	Brown 16', 38', 57' (pen.); Folivi 62'; Marshall-Miranda (yellow card) 67'; Chilvers 70'; Poku 83'	Report	White (yellow card) 39'; Egbri (yellow card) 54'; Chandler (yellow card) 61'; Hobson (yellow card) 90'; Sterling 90+2'	Stadium: JobServe Community Stadium; Attendance: 0 Referee: Alan Young
