= Kenny Coker =

American soccer player

Personal information
- Full name: Kenny Temitope Temilade Coker
- Date of birth: November 10, 2003 (age 23)
- Place of birth: Atlanta, Georgia, United States
- Position: Striker

Team information
- Current team: Dover Athletic

Youth career
- Bowers & Pitsea
- Billericay Town
- 2019–2020: Southend United

Senior career*
Years	Team	Apps	(Gls)
2020–2021	Southend United	4	(0)
2021–2024	Norwich City	0	(0)
2023	→ Chelmsford City (loan)	6	(0)
2024–2025	Cray Wanderers	26	(3)
2025	Cheshunt	15	(6)
2025–	Dover Athletic	0	(0)
- * Club domestic league appearances and goals as of 10:55, June 20, 2025 (UTC)

Kenny Temitope Temilade Coker (born November 10, 2003) is an American professional soccer player who plays as a striker for National League South club Dover Athletic.

== Career ==
=== Southend United ===
On February 1, 2020, after previously appearing in the youth systems at Bowers & Pitsea and Billericay Town, Coker made his debut for Southend United in a 2–1 victory over Lincoln City in League One. At 16 years and 83 days he was the third youngest player to ever play for Southend United.

=== Norwich City ===
In May 2021, it was announced that Coker had agreed to join Norwich City, following a trial with the club. He made his debut for the club's under-18 side in a 3–0 loss to Fulham that month.

On July 19, 2021, Coker signed his first professional contract with the Canaries.

On November 6, 2023, Coker joined Chelmsford City on loan.

=== Non-League ===
Ahead of the 2024–25 season, Coker signed for Isthmian League side Cray Wanderers on a permanent deal. In January 2025, Coker signed for Cheshunt.

In June 2025, Coker joined newly promoted National League South side Dover Athletic.

== Personal life ==
Coker was born in Atlanta, Georgia to an English mother and Nigerian father.

== Career statistics ==
As of end of 2024–25 season

Appearances and goals by club, season and competition
Club	Season	League			FA Cup		League Cup		Other		Total	
Club	Season	Division	Apps	Goals	Apps	Goals	Apps	Goals	Apps	Goals	Apps	Goals
Southend United	2019–20	League One	2	0	0	0	0	0	0	0	2	0
Southend United	2020–21	League Two	2	0	0	0	0	0	1 (Note: Appearance in EFL Trophy)	0	3	0
Southend United	Total		4	0	0	0	0	0	1	0	5	0
Cray Wanderers	2024–25	Isthmian League Premier Division	26	3	6	3	—		1 (Note: Appearance(s) in FA Trophy)	0	33	6
Cheshunt	2024–25	Isthmian League Premier Division	15	6	0	0	—		1 (Note: Appearance(s) in Herts Senior Cup)	1	16	7
Career total			45	9	6	3	0	0	3	1	54	13
