= St Thomas More High School =

Location
- Kenilworth Gardens; Westcliff-on-Sea, Essex, SS0 0BW; England; 51.5541°N 0.6707°E

Information
- Type: Academy Converter
- Motto: God's Servant First
- Religious affiliation: Roman Catholic
- Established: 1960
- Local authority: Southend-on-Sea
- Department for Education URN: 137310 Tables
- Ofsted: Reports
- Chair of Governors: John Foster
- Head teacher: Gemma Ackred
- Gender: Boys (mixed sixth form)
- Age: 11 to 18
- Enrolment: ~1000
- Website: www.st-thomasmore.southend.sch.uk

St Thomas More High School is a Roman Catholic bilateral academy school located in Westcliff-on-Sea, Essex, England. It caters for boys between the ages of 11 and 18 but has a mixed sixth form. The school is larger than the average sized secondary academy. 1,027 students were on the roll in September 2015 (including 500 sixth form students). The majority of pupils come from local Roman Catholic schools but the school does accept pupils from other Christian denominations. The school is located in the Diocese of Brentwood and the serving bishop is Rt. Revd. Alan Williams. The school's patron saint is St Thomas More, which is mainly celebrated annually on St Thomas More Day.

The school is bounded on two sides by playing fields, belonging to two neighbouring schools, while private housing and a dual carriageway border the other two sides.

An extension to the school opened in September 2019.

== History ==
The school opened as a two-form entry school in 1960 with around 100-200 pupils and has progressively expanded. In September 1973 it was extended to become a four-form entry school and its status was changed to a bilateral school offering 30 selective and 115 non-selective places. Various building projects have taken place including a modern sixth-form block, which was completed in 1996.

The school became grant-maintained on 1 September 1993, and the first sixth-form intake was admitted in September 1996. It was converted to voluntary-aided status in September 1999.

There was an extensive refurbishment project, completed in autumn 2001, which provided the school with a new reception area, extra classrooms, a new art department and a music room with individual practice facilities. A new technology block was built in 2003.

Former deputy head teacher and Head of RE Chris Danes, an author of best selling textbooks and fiction who has bipolar disorder and is now a writer and broadcaster, had to resign from the School in 1997 on the grounds of ill health and at the young age of 36. Danes maintains he retired from teaching after becoming dangerously ill in 1997, he believes largely because of the unsympathetic way he was treated at work. He talked candidly and movingly about this on a teacher's channel TV programme on mental health.

Following protests by residents, in June 2003 the Council denied the School permission to install six 13-metre-high floodlights on the hockey pitch. These were subsequently installed in 2007.

St Thomas More became a specialist Mathematics and Computing College in September 2004, and continues with the specialism today.

Ex-headmaster Frank Keenan was awarded the Order of the British Empire in 2005. The school celebrated its 50th Anniversary Jubilee in July 2011 and became an academy on 17 August 2011.

In 2013, it was announced that ex-headteacher Mr P Travis had decided to work elsewhere; then deputy headteacher Mrs Gemma Ackred (née Nye) was appointed as Acting Headteacher and later proceeded to become the Headteacher in late 2013 after wide support from the students and staff. After which, Mr Phillip Maxfield became the deputy headteacher of the school.

== Academic achievements ==
Pupils enter the school aged 11 with above average standards and their attainment both at age 14 and 16 is above the national average. In the November 2005 Ofsted inspection the school was rated 'Good’ (point 2 on a four-point scale) and an 'Outstanding' rating was given for 16- to 19-year-olds in the 'How good is the overall personal development and well-being of the learners?' category. The school regularly competes in the annual UKMT Regional Maths Challenge.

In July 2013, the school was rated ‘Requires improvement’ (point 3 on a four-point scale). In February 2015, the school was rated ‘Good’ (point 2 on a four-point scale). However, Ofsted remarks that ‘sixth form provision’ is rated at ‘requires improvement’ (point 3 on a four-point scale). Miss Elsa Genovese, head of the sixth form at the school, has made changes to the management of the sixth form to reflect on this rating.

== House system ==
The school house system traditionally consisted of 4 houses representing the four patron saints of the United Kingdom; Saint Andrew, Saint David, Saint George, Saint Patrick. In commemoration of the school's golden jubilee in 2011 a new house, chosen by pupils, Saint Sebastian was added. Furthermore, this house system now denotes the names of forms students are placed in. Originally, forms were numbered from 1–5. After the introduction of Saint Sebastian house form names were changed and assigned a Patron Saint, e.g. 7S would refer to Year 7. In 2018, a new house was created which was temporarily known as "Six" before being named Saint Vincent.

Each house has a house colour with the house colour of Saint Andrew, Saint David, Saint George, Saint Patrick, Saint Sebastian and Saint Vincent being blue, yellow, red, green, white and purple respectively.

== Sport ==
In November 2006 three pupils were selected for advanced basketball training by England Basketball. In October 2014, a pupil competed in the ASA Word Swimming Championships and their respective team placed third in England’s rankings. In 2014 and 2015, several students were offered scholarships to Harrow School due to their sporting ability.

Each year, the school holds an event called "Presentations" where sporting awards are given out.

== Leadership staff ==
- Headteacher: Mrs. G. Ackred
- Deputy Headteacher: Mr. M. Hardiman
- Director of Learning i/c Behaviour & Safety: Mr. G. Mason
- Director of Teaching & Learning: Mr. J. Hollingsworth
- Director of Learning i/c Pupil Achievement: Mr. M. Hardiman
- Director of Learning i/c Sixth Form: Ms. E. Corr
- Director of Religious Life: Mrs. C. Webb
- Director of Finance & Operations: Mrs. M. Westpfel
- Assistant Headteacher i/c Curriculum: Mrs A Hardiman
- Assistant Headteacher i/c Data and Assessment: Mr J Marshall
- Assistant Headteacher i/c Personal Development: Mrs A Lindsay

== Notable former pupils ==
- Richard McEvoy, professional golfer
- Dominic Littlewood, television presenter
- Josh Cullen, professional footballer
- Dominic Iorfa (footballer, born 1995), professional footballer
- Lewis Gard, professional footballer
- Dom Craik, guitarist, composer and band member of Nothing But Thieves
