= Jack Bridge =

English footballer

Personal information
- Full name: Jack Bridge
- Date of birth: 21 September 1995 (age 31)
- Place of birth: Southend-on-Sea, England
- Height: 1.78 m (5 ft 10 in)
- Positions: Left wing back; central attacking midfielder

Team information
- Current team: Chelmsford City
- Number: 23

Youth career
- West Ham United
- Leigh Ramblers
- 2004–2014: Southend United

Senior career*
Years	Team	Apps	(Gls)
2014–2018	Southend United	7	(0)
2014	→ Soham Town Rangers (loan)	5	(2)
2015	→ Chelmsford City (loan)	9	(0)
2016	→ Chelmsford City (loan)	14	(7)
2018–2019	Northampton Town	32	(2)
2019–2020	Carlisle United	28	(0)
2020–2021	Concord Rangers	10	(1)
2021	Bromley	28	(3)
2021–2026	Southend United	228	(32)
2026–	Chelmsford City	14	(1)
- * Club domestic league appearances and goals as of 17:18, 3 November 2026 (UTC)

Jack Bridge (born 21 September 1995) is an English professional footballer who plays as a left wingback or Attacking midfielder for National League South club Chelmsford City.

== Career ==
Bridge started his career at West Ham United, before being released at under-8 level and subsequently joining local club Leigh Ramblers. At the age of nine, Bridge joined hometown club Southend United and signed his first professional contract with the club in April 2014. Bridge went on loan to Soham Town Rangers in November 2014 and experienced his first taste of first team football, scoring two goals in five starts in his time at the club. After it was reported that Bridge was on the radar of clubs bigger in stature than Soham, Bridge signed for Chelmsford City in January 2015 on an initial one-month loan deal which was later extended to the end of the season. On 22 January 2016, Bridge returned to Chelmsford City alongside fellow Southend loanee Jason Williams. Bridge scored, assisted and was named Man of the Match on his return to the club in a 4–3 win against Whitehawk a day later.

On 30 April 2016, Bridge made his debut for Southend United in a 1–0 loss against Bradford City as a substitute for Glen Kamara. On 9 May 2016, Bridge signed a two-year contract extension at Southend United.

In January 2017, Bridge began training with Bournemouth ahead of a possibility of a permanent transfer to the club.

On 5 January 2018, Bridge joined Northampton Town for an undisclosed fee. On 6 May 2019, Northampton announced Bridge was amongst eight players to be released prior to the start of the next season. A month later he joined fellow League Two side Carlisle United on a one-year deal.

In August 2020, Bridge played in pre-season on trials for both Bristol Rovers and Southend United.

On 30 October 2020, Bridge signed for National League South side Concord Rangers.

On 23 January 2021, Bridge signed for National League side Bromley.

On 9 June 2021, Bridge re-signed for National League side Southend United.

On 9 June 2026, Bridge signed a permanent multi-year deal at Chelmsford City.

== Career statistics ==
As of match played 27 January 2026

Appearances and goals by club, season and competition
Club	Season	League			FA Cup		League Cup		Other		Total	
Club	Season	Division	Apps	Goals	Apps	Goals	Apps	Goals	Apps	Goals	Apps	Goals
Southend United	2014–15	League Two	0	0	0	0	0	0	0	0	0	0
Southend United	2015–16	League One	2	0	0	0	0	0	0	0	2	0
Southend United	2016–17	League One	4	0	0	0	1	0	2 (Note: Appearances in EFL Trophy)	0	7	0
Southend United	2017–18	League One	1	0	0	0	0	0	0	0	1	0
Southend United	Total		7	0	0	0	1	0	2	0	10	0
Chelmsford City (loan)	2014–15	Conference South	9	0	0	0	~	~	0	0	9	0
Chelmsford City (loan)	2015–16	National League South	14	7	0	0	~	~	0	0	14	7
Chelmsford City (loan)	Total		23	7	0	0	-	-	0	0	23	7
Northampton Town	2017–18	League One	4	0	0	0	0	0	0	0	4	0
Northampton Town	2018–19	League Two	28	2	1	1	1	0	2	0	32	3
Northampton Town	Total		32	2	1	1	1	0	2	0	36	3
Carlisle United	2019–20	League Two	28	0	2	1	2	2	3	0	35	3
Concord Rangers	2020–21	National League South	10	1	1	0	~	~	1 (Note: Appearances in FA Trophy)	0	12	1
Bromley	2020–21	National League	28	3	0	0	~	~	1 (Note: One appearance in National League play-offs)	0	29	3
Southend United	2021–22	National League	27	2	2	0	0	0	2	0	31	2
Southend United	2022–23	National League	42	13	1	0	0	0	2	0	45	13
Southend United	2023–24	National League	46	7	1	0	0	0	1	1	48	8
Southend United	2024–25	National League	42	1	1	1	0	0	3 (Note: Appearance(s) in National League play-offs)	1	46	3
Southend United	2025–26	National League	19	1	1	0	–		1	2	21	3
Southend United	Total		176	25	6	1	0	0	9	4	191	30
Career total			304	38	10	3	4	2	18	4	336	47

== Honours ==
Southend United

- FA Trophy: 2025–26
