= Simeon Akinola =

Nigerian footballer

Personal information
- Full name: Simeon Oluwatimelehin Akinola Olaonipekun
- Date of birth: 6 August 1992 (age 34)
- Place of birth: Lagos, Nigeria
- Height: 1.83 m (6 ft 0 in)
- Positions: Winger; forward

Youth career
- Alcorcón
- 2009–2010: Boreham Wood

Senior career*
Years	Team	Apps	(Gls)
2010–2012	Boreham Wood	21	(2)
2011	→ Billericay Town (loan)	1	(0)
2012	→ Harrow Borough (loan)	5	(4)
2012–2014	Harrow Borough	75	(22)
2014–2016	Braintree Town	104	(19)
2017–2020	Barnet	93	(21)
2020–2022	Southend United	25	(2)
2022	Wealdstone	6	(1)
Total		330	(71)
- * Club domestic league appearances and goals as of 20:12, 25 April 2023 (UTC)

Simeon Oluwatimelehin Akinola Olaonipekun (born 6 August 1992) is a retired Nigerian footballer.

== Career ==
Born in Lagos, Nigeria, Akinola moved to Madrid aged three. He started playing futsal aged nine before joining Alcorcón after a successful trial, later moving to London.

He joined the academy at Boreham Wood, and made his senior debut in January 2011, a season in which he scored 53 goals for the reserve team. He was loaned out to Billericay Town in November 2011, and then Harrow Borough in February 2012, before signing for Borough permanently for a fee of £2,400, set by tribunal after Boreham Wood rejected an initial offer of £750.

In August 2014, Akinola joined Braintree Town for an undisclosed fee.

He joined Barnet on 1 January 2017 for a fee of £40,000. He made his debut the following day against Plymouth Argyle

On 31 August 2017 - transfer deadline day - Barnet agreed terms with Lincoln City for the transfer of Akinola, pending verification from the EFL. On 5 September it was confirmed that the EFL had refused to ratify the transfer and that Akinola would remain at Barnet. He left the club at the end of the 2019–20 season, having scored 24 goals in 106 games.

On 17 September 2020, Akinola signed for Southend United on a two-year deal with an option for a third. In November 2020 it was reported that Akinola's debut for the Shrimpers was being held up by an embargo on player registrations against the club.

Akinola made his Southend United debut on 12 December 2020, starting in a 1–0 win at Roots Hall over Scunthorpe United.

On 8 October 2022, Akinola signed for National League side Wealdstone. He scored his first goal for the club on the same day, scoring in his first appearance from the bench, in a 2–1 defeat to Boreham Wood. Akinola made seven appearances before leaving the club.

== International career ==
Akinola is eligible to play for Nigeria and Spain at international level. He was called up by England C in May 2015, but was forced to withdraw.

== Personal life ==
Akinola has a degree in systems engineering from the University of Westminster. In February 2023, he joined J.P. Morgan & Co. through its athlete transition programme.

== Career statistics ==
As of 3 December 2022

Club	Season	League			FA Cup		League Cup		Other		Total	
Club	Season	Division	Apps	Goals	Apps	Goals	Apps	Goals	Apps	Goals	Apps	Goals
Boreham Wood	2010–11	Conference South	4	0	0	0	---		0	0	4	0
Boreham Wood	2011–12	Conference South	17	2	0	0	---		0	0	17	2
Boreham Wood	Boreham Wood total		21	2	0	0	---		0	0	21	2
Billericay Town (loan)	2011–12	Isthmian League Premier Division	1	0	0	0	0	0	0	0	1	0
Harrow Borough (loan)	2011–12	Isthmian League Premier Division	5	4	0	0	0	0	0	0	5	4
Harrow Borough	2012–13	Isthmian League Premier Division	37	11	1	0	---		0	0	38	11
Harrow Borough	2013–14	Isthmian League Premier Division	32	9	2	1	---		0	0	34	10
Harrow Borough	2014–15	Isthmian League Premier Division	6	2	0	0	---		0	0	6	2
Harrow Borough	Harrow total		75	22	3	1	---		0	0	78	23
Braintree Town	2014–15	Conference National	38	4	3	2	---		4 (Note: Appearances in the FA Trophy)	1	45	7
Braintree Town	2015–16	National League	41	10	0	0	---		4 (Note: Two appearances in FA Trophy, two appearances in National League play-offs)	0	45	10
Braintree Town	2016–17	National League	25	5	3	1	---		1	0	29	6
Braintree Town	Braintree total		104	19	6	3	---		9	1	119	23
Barnet	2016–17	League Two	19	2	0	0	0	0	0	0	19	2
Barnet	2017–18	League Two	29	4	1	1	1	0	1 (Note: Appearances in the EFL Trophy)	0	32	5
Barnet	2018–19	National League	14	0	1	0	---		2	0	17	0
Barnet	2019–20	National League	31	15	2	0	---		5 (Note: Four appearances and two goals in the FA Trophy, one appearance in National League playoffs)	2	38	17
Barnet	Barnet total		93	21	4	1	1	0	8	2	106	24
Southend United	2020–21	League Two	24	2	0	0	0	0	0	0	24	2
Southend United	2021-22	National League	1	0	0	0	---		0	0	1	0
Southend United	Southend total		25	2	0	0	---		0	0	25	2
Wealdstone	2022–23	National League	6	1	1	1	0	0	1 (Note: Appearance in the Middlesex Senior Cup)	0	8	2
Career total			330	71	14	6	1	0	18	3	363	80
