= Shaun Hobson =

English footballer (born 1998)

Personal information
- Full name: Shaun Jermaine Hobson
- Date of birth: 29 June 1998 (age 28)
- Place of birth: Manchester, England
- Height: 6 ft 2 in (1.88 m)
- Position: Defender

Team information
- Current team: FC Halifax Town
- Number: 5

Youth career
- Fletcher Moss Rangers
- 2014–2016: Burnley

Senior career*
Years	Team	Apps	(Gls)
2016–2020	AFC Bournemouth	0	(0)
2017	→ Eastbourne Borough (loan)	14	(1)
2018	→ Chester (loan)	13	(0)
2019	→ Eastleigh (loan)	8	(1)
2019–2020	→ Weymouth (loan)	27	(2)
2020–2023	Southend United	129	(6)
2023–2025	Oldham Athletic	56	(0)
2025–	FC Halifax Town	32	(0)
- * Club domestic league appearances and goals as of 17:59, 22 March 2026 (UTC)

Shaun Jermaine Hobson (born 29 June 1998) is an English professional footballer who plays as a defender for National League club FC Halifax Town.

== Early life ==
Hobson was born in Manchester and was a Manchester United fan in his youth. He played youth football for local side Fletcher Moss Rangers alongside Marcus Rashford and Ro-Shaun Williams.

== Career ==
Hobson began his career at Burnley in 2014, moving to AFC Bournemouth in 2016. Whilst with Bournemouth he spent loan spells at Eastbourne Borough, Chester, Eastleigh, and Weymouth.

After leaving Bournemouth, in September 2020 he signed a one-year contract with Southend United. At the end of the season he signed a new two-year contract.

He signed for Oldham Athletic in June 2023.

On 22 July 2025, Hobson returned to the National League following promotion with Oldham Athletic the previous season, joining FC Halifax Town.

== Career statistics ==
As of 14 January 2023

Appearances and goals by club, season and competition
Club	Season	League			FA Cup		EFL Cup		Other		Total	
Club	Season	Division	Apps	Goals	Apps	Goals	Apps	Goals	Apps	Goals	Apps	Goals
AFC Bournemouth	2016–17	Premier League	0	0	0	0	0	0	—		0	0
AFC Bournemouth	2017–18	Premier League	0	0	0	0	0	0	—		0	0
AFC Bournemouth	2018–19	Premier League	0	0	0	0	0	0	—		0	0
AFC Bournemouth	2019–20	Premier League	0	0	0	0	0	0	—		0	0
AFC Bournemouth	Total		0	0	0	0	0	0	—		0	0
Eastbourne Borough (loan)	2016–17	National League South	14	1	0	0	—		1 (Note: Appearance(s) in Sussex Senior Challenge Cup)	0	15	1
Chester (loan)	2017–18	National League	13	0	0	0	—		0	0	13	0
Eastleigh (loan)	2018–19	National League	8	1	0	0	—		0	0	8	1
Weymouth (loan)	2019–20	National League South	27	2	3	0	—		4 (Note: Two appearances in FA Trophy, two appearances in National League South play-offs)	0	34	2
Southend United	2020–21	League Two	44	2	1	0	1	0	2 (Note: Appearance(s) in EFL Trophy)	0	48	2
Southend United	2021–22	National League	41	1	1	0	—		2 (Note: Appearance(s) in FA Trophy)	0	44	1
Southend United	2022–23	National League	24	2	1	0	—		1	0	26	2
Southend United	Total		109	5	3	0	1	0	5	0	118	5
Career total			171	9	6	0	1	0	10	0	188	9

== Honours ==
Oldham Athletic

- National League play-offs: 2025

Individual

- Southend United Player of the Year: 2020–21
- National League Player of the Month: October 2022
