= Harry Kyprianou =

English footballer (born 1997)

Personal information
- Full name: Harry Kypros Kyprianou
- Date of birth: 16 March 1997 (age 29)
- Place of birth: Enfield, England
- Height: 1.82 m (5 ft 11 1/2 in)
- Positions: Full-back; winger

Team information
- Current team: Maidstone United

Youth career
- 2013–2015: Watford

Senior career*
Years	Team	Apps	(Gls)
2015–2021	Southend United	23	(1)
2016	→ Lowestoft Town (loan)	13	(0)
2020	→ Bromley (loan)	3	(0)
2021–2022	Oxford City	21	(0)
2022–2023	Weymouth	23	(2)
2023–	Maidstone United	1	(0)

International career
2018	Cyprus U21	4	(0)
- * Club domestic league appearances and goals as of 13:42, 3 October 2023 (UTC)

Harry Kypros Kyprianou (Greek: Χάρη Κύπρος Κυπριανού; born 16 March 1997) is a Cypriot footballer who plays as a full-back or winger for National League South club Maidstone United.

== Club career ==
Kyprianou joined Southend United in September 2015 after a successful trial with the club.

He made his debut for Southend on 30 August 2016, scoring in the 2–0 win in the 2016–17 EFL Trophy against Brighton & Hove Albion U23's.

On 23 October 2020, Kyprianou joined Bromley on a short-term loan.

He was released by Southend in the summer of 2021 following their relegation from the English Football League to the National League. He subsequently signed for National League South side Oxford City in September 2021.

In July 2022, Kyprianou signed for recently relegated National League South club Weymouth.

On 22 September 2023, Kyprianou joined Maidstone United having been training with the club for a number of weeks.

== International career ==
Kyprianou debuted with the Cyprus national under-21 football team in a 4–0 2019 UEFA European Under-21 Championship qualification loss to Hungary U21 on 22 March 2018.

== Style of play ==
Southend United manager Phil Brown stated that Kyprianou "can play at left-back, on the left wing and also on the left hand side of three centre-backs" and claimed "he covers plenty of positions".

== Career statistics ==
As of end of 2022–23 season

Appearances and goals by club, season and competition
Club	Season	League			FA Cup		League Cup		Other		Total	
Club	Season	Division	Apps	Goals	Apps	Goals	Apps	Goals	Apps	Goals	Apps	Goals
Southend United	2015–16	League One	0	0	0	0	0	0	0	0	0	0
Southend United	2016–17	League One	3	1	0	0	0	0	2 (Note: Appearances in the Football League Trophy)	1	5	2
Southend United	2017–18	League One	13	0	0	0	0	0	2	0	15	0
Southend United	2018–19	League One	1	0	1	0	1	0	1	1	4	1
Southend United	2019–20	League One	1	0	0	0	0	0	0	0	1	0
Southend United	2020–21	League Two	5	0	0	0	0	0	2	0	7	0
Southend United	Southend total		23	1	1	0	1	0	7	2	32	3
Lowestoft Town (loan)	2015–16	National League South	13	0	0	0	0	0	0	0	13	0
Bromley (loan)	2020–21	National League	3	0	2	0	0	0	0	0	5	0
Oxford City	2021–22	National League North	21	0	1	0	—		1 (Note: Appearance(s) in FA Trophy)	0	23	0
Weymouth	2022–23	National League South	23	2	5	1	—		0	0	28	3
Career total			83	3	9	1	1	0	8	2	101	6
