= Louis Walsh (footballer) =

English footballer

Personal information
- Full name: Louis Anthony Dermot Walsh
- Date of birth: 5 August 2000 (age 26)
- Place of birth: Aylesbury Vale, England
- Height: 1.87 m (6 ft 1 1/2 in)
- Position: Winger

Team information
- Current team: Slough Town
- Number: 17

Senior career*
Years	Team	Apps	(Gls)
2018–2019	Barnsley	0	(0)
2018–2019	→ Guiseley (loan)	5	(0)
2020–2022	Southend United	12	(0)
2022	Barnet	9	(0)
2022	→ Beaconsfield Town (loan)	6	(0)
2022	→ Banbury United (loan)	4	(0)
2022–2023	Slough Town	12	(0)
2023	→ Thame United (loan)	1	(0)
2023	→ Risborough Rangers (loan)	8	(3)
2023–2024	Bedford Town	24	(7)
2024	AFC Dunstable	6	(1)
2024	Oxford City	8	(0)
2025	Bishop's Stortford	4	(1)
2025	Gosport Borough	5	(0)
2025	Flackwell Heath	5	(1)
2025–2026	Thame United	37	(22)
2026–	Slough Town	0	(0)
- * Club domestic league appearances and goals as of 06:38, 2 May 2026 (UTC)

Louis Anthony Dermot Walsh (born 5 August 2000) is an English professional footballer who plays as a winger for National League South side Slough Town.

== Career ==
Walsh signed for Barnsley in July 2018, having previously been on trial with the club. He moved on loan to Guiseley in November 2018 for a month, making 5 league and 5 cup appearances for the club.

After leaving Barnsley in April 2019 he went on trial with Nottingham Forest. He signed for Southend United in December 2020 on an 18-month contract. Walsh scored once in sixteen appearances in all competitions for the Shrimpers.

Walsh joined Barnet on a permanent contract on 16 February 2022. In July 2022, Walsh, along with team-mate Aymen Azaze, joined Beaconsfield Town on loan. In November 2022, he joined Banbury United on a one-month loan. He left the Bees by mutual consent in December 2022.

Walsh signed for Slough Town in December 2022. He later registered also with Thame United and Risborough Rangers. He joined Bedford Town for the 2023–24 season. After nine goals in 32 games for the Eagles, he joined AFC Dunstable in March 2024.

After a successful trial period, Walsh joined Oxford City in August 2024. He scored four goals on his debut against Willand Rovers in the FA Cup. In February 2025, following a short spell with Bishop's Stortford, he joined Gosport Borough. He moved to Flackwell Heath later that season.

After a season back at Thame United, Walsh returned to National League South side, Slough Town in May 2026.

== Playing style ==
Former club Barnsley said of Walsh that "blessed with incredible acceleration and terrific technique, the flying winger ghosts past defenders with consummate ease and frequently provides teammates with assists while contributing with goals too".

== Career statistics ==
As of 14 September 2024

Appearances and goals by club, season and competition
Club	Season	League			National Cup		League Cup		Other		Total	
Club	Season	Division	Apps	Goals	Apps	Goals	Apps	Goals	Apps	Goals	Apps	Goals
Barnsley	2018–19	League One	0	0	0	0	0	0	0	0	0	0
Guiseley (loan)	2018–19	National League North	5	0	2	0	0	0	3 (Note: Two appearances in FA Trophy, one appearance in West Riding County Cup)	0	10	0
Southend United	2020–21	League Two	5	0	0	0	0	0	—		5	0
Southend United	2021–22	National League	7	0	2	1	—		2 (Note: Appearance(s) in FA Trophy)	0	11	1
Southend United	Total		12	0	2	1	0	0	2	0	16	1
Barnet	2021–22	National League	9	0	0	0	0	0	2 (Note: Appearance(s) in Middlesex Senior Cup)	0	11	0
Beaconsfield Town (loan)	2022–23	SFL Premier Division South	6	0	0	0	0	0	0	0	6	0
Banbury United (loan)	2022–23	National League North	4	0	0	0	0	0	0	0	4	0
Slough Town	2022–23	National League South	12	0	0	0	0	0	0	0	12	0
Thame United (loan)	2022–23	SFL Division One Central	1	0	0	0	0	0	0	0	1	0
Risborough Rangers (loan)	2022–23	SSML Premier Division	8	3	0	0	0	0	0	0	8	3
Bedford Town	2023–24	SFL Division One Central	24	7	4	1	0	0	4 (Note: Three appearances in FA Trophy, one appearance and one goal in Bedfordshire Senior Cup)	1	32	9
AFC Dunstable	2023–24	SFL Division One Central	6	1	0	0	0	0	1 (Note: One appearance in divisional play-offs)	0	7	1
Oxford City	2024–25	National League North	0	0	1	4	0	0	0	0	1	4
Career total			87	11	9	6	0	0	12	1	108	18
