= Terrell Egbri =

English footballer (born 2001)

Personal information
- Full name: Terrell Evieoghene Oluwatoby Egbri
- Date of birth: 21 June 2001 (age 25)
- Place of birth: Lambeth, England
- Height: 1.63 m (5 ft 4 in)
- Position: Midfielder

Team information
- Current team: Eastbourne Borough
- Number: 17

Youth career
- –2015: Carrib
- 2015–2019: Southend United

Senior career*
Years	Team	Apps	(Gls)
2019–2022	Southend United	41	(3)
2019–2020	→ Harlow Town (loan)	21	(7)
2022	→ Farnborough (loan)	11	(0)
2022	Bishop's Stortford	5	(0)
2022	Harlow Town	18	(7)
2022–2024	Maldon & Tiptree	33	(4)
2024	Babrungas	0	(0)
2024	Maldon & Tiptree	10	(4)
2024	MFK Vyškov	12	(0)
2024–2025	Harlow Town	16	(2)
2025–2026	Maldon & Tiptree	41	(6)
2026–	Eastbourne Borough	15	(4)
- * Club domestic league appearances and goals as of 23:19, 21 November 2026 (UTC)

Terrell Evieoghene Oluwatoby Egbri (born 21 June 2001) is an English professional footballer who plays for Isthmian League Premier Division club Eastbourne Borough.

== Career ==
Born in Lambeth, Egbri joined the youth team of Southend United in 2015 from Carrib FC, before receiving a developmental contract with the club in the summer of 2019.

He joined Harlow Town on loan in July 2019.

He made his debut for Southend on 1 October 2019, in a 2–0 defeat at home to Brighton & Hove Albion under-21s. He made his League One debut on 11 February 2020 in a 4–0 defeat away at Peterborough United, and scored the first goal of his senior career on 7 March 2020 in a 3–1 victory against Bristol Rovers.

On 22 January 2022, Egbri joined Southern League side, Farnborough on loan for the remainder of the 2021–22 campaign.

Egbri was released by Southend at the end of the 2021–22 season before joining Bishop's Stortford in July 2022. His spell Hertfordshire did not last long, returning to Harlow Town in September where he had previously spent on loan. On 7 December 2022, the club were forced to pull out of the Southern League Division One Central due to problems with their artificial pitch. This subsequently saw all league fixtures and points wiped and first-team players contracts' terminated to relieve operating costs. Upon his departure, Egbri joined Isthmian League North Division side, Maldon & Tiptree later that month.

In January 2024, Egbri joined Lithuanian Second Division club Babrungas, making the move into full-time football. Within two weeks of his departure however, he had returned to Maldon & Tiptree.

In July 2024, he joined Czech National Football League club MFK Vyškov following a successful trial. In December 2024, he returned to England for a third spell with Harlow Town.

In May 2025, Egbri returned to Maldon & Tiptree.

On 1 August 2026, Egbri signed for Isthmian League side Eastbourne Borough.

== Career statistics ==
As of match played 21 November 2026

Club	Season	League			National Cup (Note: Includes appearances in FA Cup and Czech Cup)		League Cup (Note: Includes appearances in EFL Cup)		Other		Total	
Club	Season	Division	Apps	Goals	Apps	Goals	Apps	Goals	Apps	Goals	Apps	Goals
Southend United	2019–20	League One	6	1	0	0	0	0	1 (Note: Appearance(s) in EFL Trophy)	0	7	1
Southend United	2020–21	League Two	25	1	1	1	1	0	3	0	30	2
Southend United	2021–22	National League	10	0	1	0	—		1 (Note: Appearance(s) in FA Trophy)	0	12	0
Southend United	Southend United		41	2	2	1	1	0	5	0	49	3
Harlow Town (loan)	2019–20	IL South Central Division	21	7	1	0	—		4 (Note: One appearance in FA Trophy, one appearance in Isthmian League Cup, two appearances in other cup competitions)	0	26	7
Farnborough (loan)	2021–22	SL Premier Division South	11	0	—		—		0	0	11	0
Bishop's Stortford	2022–23	IL Premier Division	5	0	1	0	—		—		6	0
Harlow Town	2022–23	SL Division One Central	0	0	—		—		3	1	3	1
Maldon & Tipree	2022–23	IL North Division	17	3	—		—		—		17	3
Maldon & Tipree	2023–24	IL North Division	26	5	4	0	—		1	0	31	5
Maldon & Tipree	Total		43	8	4	0	0	0	1	0	48	8
MFK Vyškov	2024–25	Czech National Football League	12	0	3	0	—		0	0	15	0
Harlow Town	2024–25	Eastern Counties League	16	2	—		—		3 (Note: Appearance(s) in Eastern Counties Challenge Cup)	0	19	2
Maldon & Tipree	2025–26	IL North Division	41	6	6	0	—		4 (Note: One appearance in FA Trophy, three appearances and one goal in Essex Senior Cup)	1	51	7
Eastbourne Borough	2026–27	IL Premier Division	15	4	4	1	—		5 (Note: Three appearance(s) in FA Trophy, two appearances in Sussex Senior Cup)	0	24	5
Career total			205	29	21	2	1	0	25	2	252	33
