= Tom Clifford (footballer) =

English footballer (born 1999)

Personal information
- Full name: Thomas Clifford
- Date of birth: 9 February 1999 (age 27)
- Place of birth: Swanscombe, England
- Height: 1.75 m (5 ft 9 in)
- Position: Left back

Team information
- Current team: Ramsgate

Youth career
- Halls AFC: Foots Cray Lions
- Tottenham Hotspur
- 2010–2018: Southend United

Senior career*
Years	Team	Apps	(Gls)
2018–2023	Southend United	62	(5)
2017–2018	→ Bishop's Stortford (loan)	17	(1)
2019–2020	→ Concord Rangers (loan)	12	(1)
2023–2024	King's Lynn Town	15	(0)
2024	→ Dartford (loan)	7	(0)
2025–	Ramsgate	61	(2)
- * Club domestic league appearances and goals as of 16:21, 29 December 2025 (UTC)

Thomas Clifford (born 9 February 1999) is an English professional footballer who plays as a left back for Isthmian League Premier Division club Ramsgate.

== Career ==
=== Southend United ===
Clifford began his career at Sidcup-based youth team Foots Cray Lions, before moving to the academy at Tottenham Hotspur. In 2010, Clifford signed for Southend United.

In the summer of 2018, Clifford signed his first professional contract with Southend.

On 26 December 2018, Clifford made his debut for Southend as a stoppage time substitute in a 1–0 defeat against Oxford United.

At the end of the 2019–20 season, Clifford signed a one-year contract extension with Southend.

==== Bishop's Stortford (loan) ====
During the 2017–18 season, Clifford spent time on loan at Bishop's Stortford

==== Concord Rangers (loan) ====
During the 2019–20 season, Clifford was loaned to National League South club Concord Rangers, making twelve appearances, scoring once.

=== King's Lynn Town ===
On 1 August 2023, Clifford had his contract with Southend terminated by mutual consent to allow him to join National League North club King's Lynn Town on a two-year deal.

==== Dartford (loan) ====
On 15 February 2024, Clifford joined Dartford on a one-month loan.

=== Ramsgate ===
In August 2024, Clifford joined Isthmian League South East Division club Ramsgate.

During his first season at the club, he was part of the team that earned promotion to the Isthmian League Premier Division as champions.

== Career statistics ==
As of match played 27 December 2025

Appearances and goals by club, season and competition
Club	Season	League			FA Cup		EFL Cup		Other		Total	
Club	Season	Division	Apps	Goals	Apps	Goals	Apps	Goals	Apps	Goals	Apps	Goals
Southend United	2018–19	League One	1	0	0	0	0	0	0	0	1	0
Southend United	2019–20	League One	8	0	0	0	0	0	0	0	8	0
Southend United	2020–21	League Two	28	3	1	0	0	0	2 (Note: Appearances in EFL Trophy)	0	31	3
Southend United	2021–22	National League	19	2	0	0	—		2 (Note: Appearances in FA Trophy)	0	21	2
Southend United	2022–23	National League	6	0	0	0	—		0	0	6	0
Southend United	Total		62	5	1	0	0	0	4	0	67	5
Bishop's Stortford (loan)	2017–18	Southern League Premier Division	17	1	0	0	—		0	0	17	1
Concord Rangers (loan)	2019–20	National League South	12	1	0	0	—		2	0	14	1
King's Lynn Town	2023–24	National League North	15	0	0	0	—		0	0	15	0
Dartford (loan)	2023–24	National League South	7	0	—		—		0	0	7	0
Ramsgate	2024–25	Isthmian League South East Division	42	1	4	0	—		5 (Note: Three appearances in FA Trophy, one appearance in Kent Senior Cup, one appearance in Alan Turvey Trophy)	0	51	1
Ramsgate	2025–26	Isthmian League Premier Division	19	1	1	0	—		2 (Note: One appearance in FA Trophy, one appearance in Alan Turvey Trophy)	0	22	1
Ramsgate	Total		61	2	5	0	0	0	7	0	73	2
Career total			174	9	6	0	0	0	13	0	193	9

== Honours ==
Ramsgate

- Isthmian League South East Division: 2024–25
