= 2017–18 Southend United F.C. season =

Southend United
2017–18 season
- Chairman: Ron Martin
- Manager: Phil Brown (until 17 January 2018); Chris Powell (from 23 January 2018)
- Stadium: Roots Hall
- League One: 10th
- FA Cup: First round
- EFL Cup: First round
- EFL Trophy: Second round
- Top goalscorer: Simon Cox (10)
Home colours	Away colours

The 2017–18 season was Southend United's 112th year in existence and their third consecutive season in League One. Along with competing in League One, the club also participated in the FA Cup, EFL Cup and EFL Trophy. The season covers the period from 1 July 2017 to 30 June 2018.

== Competitions ==
=== Friendlies ===
As of 2 June 2017, Southend United had announced five pre-season friendlies against Braintree Town, Bishop's Stortford, Ebbsfleet United, Brighton & Hove Albion and Cambridge United.

15 July 2017	Braintree Town	1–2	Southend United	Braintree
15:00 BST	Oliyide 41'	Report	Cox 26'; Fortuné 44'	Stadium: Cressing Road

18 July 2017	Bishop's Stortford	0–4	Southend United	Bishop's Stortford
19:45 BST		Report	Cox 12', 69'; Kightly 23'; Cotton 83'	Stadium: Woodside Park

22 July 2017	Ebbsfleet United	1–1	Southend United	Northfleet
15:00 BST	McQueen 66'	Report	Trialist 74'	Stadium: Stonebridge Road Stadium

25 July 2017	Southend United	0–3	Brighton & Hove Albion	Southend-on-Sea
19:45 BST		Report	March 34', 41'; Murray 45'	Stadium: Roots Hall

29 July 2017	Cambridge United	0–2	Southend United	Cambridge
15:00 BST			Marc-Antoine Fortuné; Robinson	Stadium: Abbey Stadium

=== League One ===
==== League table ====
Pos	Team	Pld	W	D	L	GF	GA	GD	Pts
8	Portsmouth	46	20	6	20	57	56	+1	66
9	Peterborough United	46	17	13	16	68	60	+8	64
10	Southend United	46	17	12	17	58	62	−4	63
11	Bradford City	46	18	9	19	57	67	−10	63
12	Blackpool	46	15	15	16	60	55	+5	60

Source: BBC Sport
Rules for classification: 1) Points; 2) Goal difference; 3) Number of goals scored

==== Result summary ====
Overall								Home						Away					
Pld	W	D	L	GF	GA	GD	Pts	W	D	L	GF	GA	GD	W	D	L	GF	GA	GD
35	12	9	14	42	54	−12	45	9	6	4	28	21	+7	3	3	10	14	33	−19

Last updated: 10 March 2018.

==== Results by matchday ====
Matchday	1	2	3	4	5	6	7	8	9	10	11	12	13	14	15	16	17	18	19	20	21	22	23	24	25	26	27	28	29	30	31	32	33	34	35	36	37	38	39	40	41	42
Ground	H	A	H	A	H	A	A	H	A	H	H	A	A	H	H	A	A	A	H	H	A	H	A	H	H	A	A	H	H	A	H	A	H	H	H	A	A	H	A	H	A	A
Result	W	L	D	D	D	L	L	D	W	W	W	L	L	D	W	W	L	D	D	W	L	L	L	W	L	L	L	L	W	W	W	D	W	L	D	D	D	W	L	W	L	L
Position	6	15	14	15	14	17	19	18	16	14	12	15	15	15	13	11	14	14	14	9	12	15	18	18	18	18	18	18	17	15	14	14	13	14	13	13	13	12	12	12	11	15

Updated to match(es) played on 10 March 2018. Source: Statto.com
A = Away; H = Home; W = Win; D = Draw; L = Loss

==== Matches ====
5 August 2017 1	Southend United	2–1	Blackburn Rovers	Southend-on-Sea
15:00 BST	Leonard 27'; Kightly 38'	Report	Mulgrew 53'; Lenihan (yellow card) 55'; Nyambe (yellow card) 70'; Williams (yellow card) 72'	Stadium: Roots Hall; Attendance: 9,257; Referee: Lee Swabey

12 August 2017 2	Rotherham United	5–0	Southend United	Rotherham
15:00 BST	Moore 15', 16', 45+2', (yellow card) 70'; Newell 23', (yellow card) 88'; Williams 59'	Report	Cox (yellow card) 43'	Stadium: New York Stadium; Attendance: 8,004; Referee: Michael Salisbury

19 August 2017 3	Southend United	1–1	Plymouth Argyle	Southend-on-Sea
15:00 BST	Bradley 6' (o.g.); Timlin (yellow card) 88'	Report	Fox (yellow card) 23'; Edwards 61' (yellow card) 63'	Stadium: Roots Hall; Attendance: 7,861; Referee: Dean Whitestone

26 August 2017 4	Gillingham	3–3	Southend United	Gillingham
15:00 BST	Byrne (yellow card) 51'; Eaves 56', 63', 80' (yellow card) 90+3'; Ogilvie (yellow card) 89'	Report	Timlin (yellow card) 11'; Leonard 20'; Demetriou (yellow card) 58'; Kightly 65'; Cox 73'; Hendrie (yellow card) 87'	Stadium: Priestfield Stadium; Attendance: 5,339; Referee: Charles Breakspear

2 September 2017 5	Southend United	0–0	Rochdale	Southend-on-Sea
15:00 BST	McLaughlin (yellow card) 35'; Cox (yellow card) 45+3'; Bwomono (yellow card) 83'	Report	Kitching (yellow card) 20'; Williams (yellow card) 43'; Henderson (red card) 50'; McNulty (yellow card) 87'	Stadium: Roots Hall; Attendance: 6,208; Referee: Tim Robinson

9 September 2017 6	Charlton Athletic	2–1	Southend United	Charlton
15:00 BST	Holmes (yellow card) 52' (goal) 68'; Magennis 65'; Clarke (yellow card) 84'	Report	McGlashan (yellow card) 43'; White 78'; Kightly (yellow card) 85'	Stadium: The Valley; Attendance: 12,229; Referee: Christopher Ward

12 September 2017 7	Shrewsbury Town	1–0	Southend United	Shrewsbury
19:45 BST	Rodman (yellow card) 14'; Nolan 23'; Brown (yellow card) 58'; Whalley (yellow card) 90+2'	Report	Ferdinand (yellow card) 63'; McLaughlin (yellow card) 77'	Stadium: New Meadow; Attendance: 5,129; Referee: Ross Joyce

16 September 2017 8	Southend United	2–2	Northampton Town	Southend-on-Sea
15:00 BST	Demetriou 48'; Wordsworth 50'; Timlin (yellow card) 61'; Yearwood (yellow card) 62'; Ferdinand (yellow card) 90+7'	Report	Barnett 20'; Grimes (yellow card) 23'; Moloney (yellow card) 40'; Crooks (yellow card) 43' (yellow-red card) 90+6' (yellow card) 47'; Powell (yellow card) 67'	Stadium: Roots Hall; Attendance: 6,532; Referee: Nick Kinseley

23 September 2017 9	Fleetwood Town	2–4	Southend United	Fleetwood
15:00 BST	Bell 4'; O'Neill (red card) 31'; Pond (yellow card) 44'; Cole 90+1'	Report	Cox 2'; McLaughlin 40'; Ranger 45' (pen.); McGlashan 87'	Stadium: Highbury Stadium; Attendance: 2,874; Referee: Carl Boyeson

26 September 2017 10	Southend United	1–0	AFC Wimbledon	Southend-on-Sea
19:45 BST	Demetriou 60' (yellow card) 73'	Report	McDonald (yellow card) 63'	Stadium: Roots Hall; Attendance: 5,881; Referee: Graham Horwood

30 September 2017 11	Southend United	2–1	Blackpool	Southend-on-Sea
15:00 BST	Wordsworth 5'; Leonard (yellow card) 31'; Cox 46'; Timlin (yellow card) 71'	Report	Vassell 56'	Stadium: Roots Hall; Attendance: 6,688; Referee: John Brooks

7 October 2017 12	Doncaster Rovers	4–1	Southend United	Doncaster
15:00 BST	Marquis 45+1' (yellow card) 80'; Whiteman 47', 50', 57' (pen.); Mason (yellow card) 85'	Report	Wordsworth (yellow card) 21' (goal) 38'; White (yellow card) 49'; Oxley (yellow card) 58'; Bwomono (yellow card) 81'; Ferdinand (red card) 90+5'	Stadium: Keepmoat Stadium; Attendance: 7,369; Referee: Darren Handley

14 October 2017 13	Wigan Athletic	3–0	Southend United	Wigan
15:00 BST	Jacobs 8'; Powell 84'; Toney 88'	Report	McGlashan (red card) 59'	Stadium: DW Stadium; Attendance: 8,133; Referee: John Busby

17 October 2017 14	Southend United	1–1	Peterborough United	Southend-on-Sea
19:45 BST	Fortuné 10'; Demetriou (yellow card) 30'; Yearwood (yellow card) 53'; Cox (yellow card) 87'	Report	Baldwin (yellow card) 20'; Marriott 55'; Da Silva Lopes (yellow card) 84'	Stadium: Roots Hall; Attendance: 5,789; Referee: Kevin Johnson

21 October 2017 15	Southend United	1–0	Bury	Southend-on-Sea
15:00 BST	Leonard 84'	Report		Stadium: Roots Hall; Attendance: 6,787; Referee: Gavin Ward

28 October 2017 16	Walsall	0–1	Southend United	Bescot
15:00 BST	Donnellan (yellow card) 55'; Gillespie (yellow card) 63'; Wilson (yellow card) 63'; Edwards (yellow card) 79'	Report	Cox 17' (yellow card) 69'	Stadium: Bescot Stadium; Attendance: 4,145; Referee: Darren Drysdale

11 November 2017 P	Southend United	v	Oldham Athletic	Southend-on-Sea
15:00 GMT				Stadium: Roots Hall
Note: On 2 November, the scheduled home match against Oldham Athletic was postponed due to international call-ups.

18 November 2017 17	Portsmouth	1–0	Southend United	Milton
15:00 GMT	Pitman 54'	Report	White (yellow card) 76'	Stadium: Fratton Park; Attendance: 18,431; Referee: Carl Boyeson

21 November 2017 18	Milton Keynes Dons	1–1	Southend United	Denbigh
19:45 GMT	Wootton (yellow card) 4'; Gilbey (yellow card) 10'; Pawlett (yellow card) 64'; Agard 76' (pen.)	Report	McLaughlin 27'; Leonard (yellow card) 57'; Oxley (yellow card) 75'	Stadium: Stadium mk Attendance: 7,521; Referee: Tim Robinson

25 November 2017 19	Southend United	1–1	Oxford United	Southend-on-Sea
15:00 GMT	Cox 19'; Timlin (yellow card) 44'	Report	Thomas 22'; Xemi (yellow card) 34'; Mowatt (yellow card) 49'	Stadium: Roots Hall; Attendance: 6,797; Referee: Dean Whitestone

2 December 2017 20	Southend United	2–0	Oldham Athletic	Southend-on-Sea
15:00 GMT	Demetriou 17' (pen.) (yellow card) 40'; Wright 54'; McLaughlin (yellow card) 56'	Report	Doyle (yellow card) 90+3'	Stadium: Roots Hall; Attendance: 5,608; Referee: Charles Breakspear

9 December 2017 21	Bristol Rovers	3–0	Southend United	Horfield
15:00 GMT	Bodin 15'; Harrison 74'; Sercombe 86'	Report	Ferdinand (yellow card) 44'	Stadium: Memorial Stadium; Attendance: 8,062; Referee: Tom Nield

16 December 2017 22	Southend United	1–2	Bradford City	Southend-on-Sea
15:00 GMT	Wright (yellow card) 41'; Ranger (yellow card) 47' (goal) 75'; Leonard (yellow card) 74' (yellow-red card)	Report	Poleon 9' (yellow card) 75'; Knight-Percival (yellow card) 55'; Wyke 90' (pen.); McMahon (yellow card) 90+1'	Stadium: Roots Hall; Attendance: 6,097; Referee: (England) Keith Stroud

23 December 2017 23	Scunthorpe United	3–1	Southend United	Scunthorpe
15:00 GMT	van Veen 32'; Townsend 63'; Turner 86' (o.g.)	Report	Demetriou 25'; Wordsworth (yellow card) 35'	Stadium: Glanford Park; Attendance: 4,040; Referee: (England) Martin Coy

26 December 2017 24	Southend United	3–1	Charlton Athletic	Southend-on-Sea
13:00 GMT	Cox 2' 79'; Turner 11'; Leonard (yellow card) 38'; Coker (yellow card) 63'; Ranger (yellow card) 77'; Oxley (yellow card) 86'	Report	Reeves 66'; Lennon (yellow card) 81'; Konsa (yellow card) 90+2'	Stadium: Roots Hall; Attendance: 9,588; Referee: (England) Darren Drysdale

30 December 2017 25	Southend United	1–2	Shrewsbury Town	Southend-on-Sea
15:00 GMT	Wright (yellow card) 34'; Leonard 55'; Turner (yellow card) 64'	Report	Coker 18' (o.g.); Godfrey 40'; Whalley (yellow card) 62'; Rodman (yellow card) 90'	Stadium: Roots Hall; Attendance: 7,076; Referee: (England) Gavin Ward

1 January 2018 26	AFC Wimbledon	2–0	Southend United	London
15:00 GMT	Trotter 27'; Soares 48'	Report		Stadium: Kingsmeadow; Attendance: 4,392; Referee: (England) John Busby

6 January 2018 27	Northampton Town	3–1	Southend United	Northampton
14:00 GMT	O'Toole 19'; Grimes 49' (pen.); Crooks (yellow card) 85'; Revell 90'	Report	Demetriou 26' (pen.)	Stadium: Sixfields Stadium; Attendance: 5,267; Referee: (England) Michael Salisbury

13 January 2018 28	Southend United	1–2	Fleetwood Town	Southend-on-Sea
15:00 GMT	Kightly 86'	Report	Diagouraga (yellow card) 53' (goal) 57'; Madden 62'; Coyle (yellow card) 78'	Stadium: Roots Hall; Attendance: 6,489; Referee: (England) Anthony Coggins

20 January 2018 P	Rochdale	v	Southend United	Rochdale
15:00 GMT				Stadium: Crown Oil Arena

27 January 2018 29	Southend United	3–2	Scunthorpe United	Southend-on-Sea
15:00 GMT	McLaughlin (yellow card) 28'; Kightly 37'; McLaughlin 53'; Turner 90+2' (yellow card) 90+2'	Report	Hopper 12'; Burgess (yellow card) 47' (yellow-red card) 90+1'; Goode (yellow card) 52' van Veen 56'; Hopper (yellow card) 68'	Stadium: Roots Hall; Attendance: 6,723; Referee: Craig Hicks

3 February 2018 30	Peterborough United	0–1	Southend United	Peterborough
15:00 GMT	Bond (yellow card) 6'; Tafazolli (yellow card) 69'; Shephard (yellow card) 81'	Report	Demetriou 7' (pen.); Yearwood (yellow card) 37'; McLaughlin (yellow card) 79'	Stadium: London Road Stadium; Attendance: 5,114; Referee: Dean Whitestone

10 February 2018 31	Southend United	3–1	Wigan Athletic	Southend-on-Sea
15:00 GMT	Turner 3'; Ferdinand (yellow card) 31'; Fortuné 36'; Kightly 83'	Report	Powell (yellow card) 43'; Dunkley (yellow card) 47'; Vaughan 67' (yellow card) 90+4'	Stadium: Roots Hall; Attendance: 7,623; Referee: Andy Woolmer

13 February 2018 32	Bury	0–0	Southend United	Bury
19:45 GMT	Dawson (yellow card) 33'; Laurent (yellow card) 63'	Report		Stadium: Gigg Lane; Attendance: 2,795; Referee: Martin Coy

17 February 2018 33	Southend United	3–1	Portsmouth	Southend-on-Sea
15:00 GMT	Clarke 6' (o.g.); Demetriou 12', 84'	Report	Evans 36'; Thompson (red card) 64'	Stadium: Roots Hall; Attendance: 9,397; Referee: Lee Probert

3 March 2018 34	Southend United	0–3	Walsall	Southend-on-Sea
15:00 GMT	Yearwood (yellow card) 72'	Report	Oztumer 57', 66', 85'; Leahy (yellow card) 60'	Stadium: Roots Hall; Attendance: 6,413; Referee: Charles Breakspear

10 March 2018 35	Southend United	0–0	Doncaster Rovers	Southend-on-Sea
15:00 GMT		Report	Baudry (yellow card) 52'	Stadium: Roots Hall; Attendance: 6,766; Referee: Kevin Johnson

13 March 2018 36	Rochdale	0–0	Southend United	Rochdale
19:45 GMT	Delaney (yellow card) 58'	Report	Kightly (yellow card) 27'; Demetriou (yellow card) 51'	Stadium: Spotland Stadium; Attendance: 2,286; Referee: Eddie Ilderton

17 March 2018 37	Blackpool	1–1	Southend United	Blackpool
	Robertson 45+2'; Philliskirk (yellow card) 69'	Report	Fortuné 11'; Cox (yellow card) 15'; Turner (yellow card) 45+1'; Timlin (yellow card) 65'; Coker (yellow card) 84'	Stadium: Bloomfield Road; Attendance: 3,213; Referee: Andy Haines

24 March 2018 38	Southend United	2–0	Rotherham United	Southend-on-Sea
15:00 GMT	McLaughlin 7'; Cox 79'	Report	Mattock (yellow card) 76'	Stadium: Roots Hall; Attendance: 7,719; Referee: Brett Huxtable

30 March 2018 39	Plymouth Argyle	4–0	Southend United	Plymouth
15:00 GMT	Lameiras 3', 88'; Carey 33', 52'; Taylor (yellow card) 45+3'	Report	Wordsworth (yellow card) 42'	Stadium: Home Park; Attendance: 11,965 (445 away); Referee: Brendan Malone

2 April 2018 40	Southend United	4–0	Gillingham	Southend-on-Sea
15:00 GMT	Turner 8'; Robinson 11'; Kightly 18'; McLaughlin 39'	Report	Hessenthaler (yellow card) 15'; Martin (red card) 45+3'; Nugent (yellow card) 57'; Wagstaff (yellow card) 62'; Byrne (yellow card) 65'	Stadium: Roots Hall; Attendance: 8,466; Referee: Graham Salisbury

7 April 2018 41	Blackburn Rovers	1–0	Southend United	Blackburn
15:00 BST	Graham 59'; Smallwood (yellow card) 84'; Downing (yellow card) 90'	Report	Cox (yellow card) 90'	Stadium: Ewood Park; Attendance: 13,186; Referee: Andy Woolmer

14 April 2018 42	Oxford United	2–0	Southend United	Oxford
15:00 BST	Henry 6'; Ricardinho 45+4'	Report		Stadium: Kassam Stadium; Attendance: 7,332 (776 away); Referee: Darren Handley

21 April 2018 43	Southend United	4–0	Milton Keynes Dons	Southend-on-Sea
15:00 BST	Robinson 23', 31', 76'; McLaughlin 62'; Yearwood (yellow card) 78'; Timlin (yellow card) 79'	Report	Tavernier (yellow card) 28'; Aneke (yellow card) 30'; Ward (yellow card) 88'	Stadium: Roots Hall; Attendance: 7,546; Referee: Gavin Ward

24 April 2018 44	Oldham Athletic	0–3	Southend United	Oldham
19:45 BST	Doyle (yellow card) 81'; Byrne (yellow card) 85'	Report	Robinson 5'; Cox 52', 56'; Demetriou (yellow card) 71'	Stadium: Boundary Park; Attendance: 3,362; Referee: David Webb

28 April 2018 45	Bradford City	0–2	Southend United	Bradford
15:00 BST		Report	White 73'; Fortuné 78'	Stadium: Valley Parade; Attendance: 19,960; Referee: Trevor Kettle

5 May 2018 46	Southend United	0–0	Bristol Rovers	Southend-on-Sea
19:45 BST	Mark Oxley (yellow card) 9'; Harry Kyprianou (yellow card) 26'	Report	Ollie Clarke (yellow card) 10' (yellow-red card) 42'; Tom Broadbent (yellow card) 75'	Stadium: Roots Hall; Attendance: 8,179; Referee: Anthony Coggins

=== FA Cup ===
On 16 October 2017, Southend United were drawn away to Yeovil Town in the first round.

4 November 2017 First round	Yeovil Town	1–0	Southend United	Yeovil
15:00 GMT	Khan 29' (pen.); Bailey (yellow card) 66'; Mugabi (yellow card) 80'	Report	Kightly (yellow card) 41'	Stadium: Huish Park; Attendance: 2,079; Referee: Craig Hicks

=== EFL Cup ===
On 16 June 2017, Southend United were drawn at home to Newport County in the first round.

8 August 2016 Round 1	Southend United	0–2	Newport County	Southend-on-Sea
19:45 BST (UTC+1)		Report	McCoulsky 52', 58'	Stadium: Roots Hall; Attendance: 2,998; Referee: Antony Coggins

=== EFL Trophy ===
On 12 July 2017, Southend United were drawn in the Southern Group B against Colchester United, Gillingham and Reading U23s. After finishing as runners-up in their group, Southend were drawn away to Peterborough United in the second round.

Pos	Lge	Team	Pld	W	PW	PL	L	GF	GA	GD	Pts	Qualification
1	L1	Gillingham (Q)	3	3	0	0	0	10	6	+4	9	Round 2
2	L1	Southend United (Q)	3	2	0	0	1	4	2	+2	6	Round 2
3	L2	Colchester United (E)	3	0	1	0	2	2	5	−3	2	
4	ACA	Reading U21 (E)	3	0	0	1	2	7	10	−3	1	

Updated to match(es) played on 7 November 2017. Source: EFL.com
(E) Eliminated; (Q) Qualified to the phase indicated

29 August 2017	Gillingham	2–1	Southend United	Gillingham
19:45 BST	Parker 8' (yellow card) 33'; Ferdinand 57' (o.g.); Ogilvie (yellow card) 63'; Wilkinson (yellow card) 90+12'	Report	McLaughlin 31'; White (yellow card) 55'; Ba (yellow card) 66'; McGlashan (yellow card) 73'; Oxley (yellow card) 90+12'	Stadium: Priestfield Stadium; Attendance: 1,549

3 October 2017	Southend United	1–0	Reading U23s	Southend-on-Sea
19:45 BST	Fortuné (yellow card) 23'; Robinson 31'	Report		Stadium: Roots Hall; Attendance: 1,148; Referee: Andy Haines

7 November 2017	Southend United	2–0	Colchester United	Southend-on-Sea
19:45 GMT	Wright 37'; Robinson 49'; Cox (yellow card) 85'	Report	Kent (yellow card) 89'	Stadium: Roots Hall; Attendance: 2,781; Referee: Stuart Attwell

6 December 2017 Second round	Peterborough United	2–0	Southend United	Peterborough
19:45 GMT	Edwards 16'; Maddison 62'; Miller (yellow card) 81'; Kanu (yellow card) 83'; Forrester (yellow card) 85'	Report	Demetriou (yellow card) 90+6'	Stadium: London Road Stadium; Attendance: 1,707; Referee: John Busby

== Squad statistics ==
=== Appearances and goals ===
As of 28 October 2017

No.	Pos	Nat	Player	Total		League One		FA Cup		EFL Cup		EFL Trophy	
No.	Pos	Nat	Player	Apps	Goals	Apps	Goals	Apps	Goals	Apps	Goals	Apps	Goals
1	GK	(England) ENG	Mark Oxley	18	0	16	0	0	0	0	0	2	0
2	DF	(Scotland) SCO	Stephen Hendrie	10	0	6+2	0	0	0	1	0	1+0	0
3	DF	(England) ENG	Ben Coker	0	0	0	0	0	0	0	0	0	0
4	MF	(England) ENG	Anthony Wordsworth	9	3	9	3	0	0	0	0	0	0
5	DF	(England) ENG	Anton Ferdinand	14	0	13	0	0	0	0	0	1	0
6	DF	(England) ENG	Michael Turner	0	0	0	0	0	0	0	0	0	0
7	MF	(England) ENG	Michael Kightly	8	2	8	2	0	0	0	0	0	0
8	DF	(Ireland) EIR	Michael Timlin	18	0	16	0	0	0	0+1	0	1	0
9	FW	(France) FRA	Marc-Antoine Fortuné	14	1	9+3	1	0	0	0+1	0	1	0
10	FW	(Ireland) EIR	Simon Cox	18	4	14+2	4	0	0	1	0	0+1	0
11	MF	(England) ENG	Stephen McLaughlin	18	2	8+7	1	0+0	0	1	0	1+1	1
12	FW	(France) FRA	Amadou Ba	3	0	0	0	0	0	0+1	0	1+1	0
13	GK	(England) ENG	Nathan Bishop	0	0	0	0	0	0	0	0	0	0
14	FW	(England) ENG	Nico Cotton	1	0	0	0	0	0	0	0	0+1	0
15	DF	(Ireland) EIR	Rob Kiernan	2	0	0+1	0	0	0	1	0	0	0
16	MF	(England) ENG	Dru Yearwood	8	0	4+1	0	0	0	1	0	2	0
17	MF	(England) ENG	Jermaine McGlashan	15	1	8+4	1	0	0	1	0	2	0
18	MF	(England) ENG	Ryan Leonard	18	3	16	3	0	0	1	0	1	0
19	MF	(England) ENG	Jack Bridge	2	0	0+1	0	0	0	0	0	1	0
20	MF	(England) ENG	Michael Klass	2	0	0	0	0	0	0	0	1+1	0
22	GK	(England) ENG	Ted Smith	1	0	0	0	0	0	1	0	0	0
23	MF	(England) ENG	Joe Bedford	0	0	0	0	0	0	0	0	0	0
24	DF	(Cyprus) CYP	Jason Demetriou	15	2	13+1	2	0	0	1	0	0	0
27	DF	(Cyprus) CYP	Harry Kyprianou	9	0	7	0	0	0	0	0	1+1	0
31	FW	(Jamaica) JAM	Theo Robinson	17	1	1+13	0	0	0	1	0	2	1
42	DF	(England) ENG	Elvis Bwomono	6	0	4	0	0	0	0	0	2+0	0
44	MF	(England) ENG	Josh Wright	8	0	8	0	0	0	0	0	0	0
48	DF	(England) ENG	John White	15	1	9+3	1	0	0	1	0	2	0
50	FW	(England) ENG	Nile Ranger	11	1	7+4	1	0	0	0	0	0	0

== Transfers ==
=== Transfers in ===
Date from	Position	Nationality	Name	From	Fee	Ref.
1 July 2017	LB	(Scotland)	Stephen Hendrie	West Ham United	Free	
7 July 2017	LW	(England)	Michael Kightly	Burnley	Free	
11 July 2017	CB	(England)	Michael Turner	Norwich City	Free	
2 August 2017	FW	(France)	Amadou Ba	Free agent	Free	
3 August 2017	CB	(Republic of Ireland)	Rob Kiernan	Rangers	Undisclosed	
16 September 2017	CM	(England)	Josh Wright	Gillingham	Free	

=== Transfers out ===
Date from	Position	Nationality	Name	To	Fee	Ref.
1 July 2017	CM	(England)	Will Atkinson	Mansfield Town	Free	
1 July 2017	RW	(England)	Zavon Hines	Chesterfield	Released	(Note: Zavon Hines joined Chesterfield following his release.)
1 July 2017	CF	(Republic of Ireland)	Dave Mooney	Leyton Orient	Released	(Note: Dave Mooney joined Leyton Orient following his release.)
1 July 2017	CF	(England)	Frank Nouble	Newport County	Released	(Note: Frank Nouble joined Newport County following his release.)
1 July 2017	RB	(England)	Luke O'Neill	Gillingham	Released	(Note: Luke O'Neill joined Gillingham following his release.)
1 July 2017	CB	(Northern Ireland)	Adam Thompson	Bury	Free	
1 July 2017	CF	(England)	Jason Williams	Bishop's Stortford	Released	(Note: Jason Williams joined Bishop's Stortford following his release.)
1 July 2017	RB	(England)	Jordan Williams	Free agent	Released	
