= 2014–15 Southend United F.C. season =

Southend United F.C.
2014–15 season
- Chairman: Ron Martin
- Manager: Phil Brown
- Stadium: Roots Hall
- League Two: 5th (promoted via play-offs)
- FA Cup: First round (vs. Chester)
- Football League Cup: First round (vs. Walsall)
- Football League Trophy: First round (vs. AFC Wimbledon)
- Top goalscorer: Barry Corr (14)
Home colours	Away colours

This page shows the progress of Southend United F.C. in the 2014–15 football season. During this season, the club played in the fourth tier of English football, League Two.

== Match details ==
=== Pre-season ===
15 July 2014	Billericay Town	1–3	Southend United	Billericay
19:45 BST	Webber 40'	Report	Hurst 13'; Weston 29', 37'	Stadium: New Lodge

19 July 2014	Braintree Town	2–1	Southend United	Braintree
13:00 BST	Bakare 44'; Davis 67'	Report	Corr 49'	Stadium: Cressing Road

29 July 2014	Southend United	1–2	Ipswich Town	Southend-on-Sea
19:45 BST	Weston 74'	Report	Bru 58'; Wordsworth 90+1'	Stadium: Roots Hall

30 July 2014	Southend United	0–0	Queens Park Rangers	Southend-on-Sea
19:45 BST		Report		Stadium: Roots Hall

=== League Two ===
==== League table ====
Pos	Team	Pld	W	D	L	GF	GA	GD	Pts	Promotion, qualification or relegation
3	Bury (P)	46	26	7	13	60	40	+20	85	Promotion to Football League One
4	Wycombe Wanderers	46	23	15	8	67	45	+22	84	Qualification for League Two play-offs (Note: Four teams play for one spot and promotion to Football League One.)
5	Southend United (O, P)	46	24	12	10	54	38	+16	84	Qualification for League Two play-offs
6	Stevenage	46	20	12	14	62	54	+8	72	Qualification for League Two play-offs
7	Plymouth Argyle	46	20	11	15	55	37	+18	71	Qualification for League Two play-offs

Updated to match(es) played on 23 May 2015. Source: BBC Sport
Rules for classification: 1) Points; 2) Goal difference; 3) Number of goals scored
(O) Play-off winners; (P) Promoted

==== Matches ====
The fixtures for the 2014–15 season were announced on 18 June 2014 at 9am.

9 August 2014 1	Accrington Stanley	0–1	Southend United	Accrington
15:00		Report	Barnard 85' (pen.)	Stadium: Crown Ground; Referee: Andy Haines

16 August 2014 2	Southend United	2–0	Stevenage	Southend-on-Sea
15:00	Weston 9'; Coker 20'	Report		Stadium: Roots Hall; Attendance: 5,397 (557 Stevenage fans); Referee: Christopher Sarginson

19 August 2014 3	Southend United	0–1	AFC Wimbledon	Southend-on-Sea
19:45		Report	Francomb 60'	Stadium: Roots Hall; Attendance: 5,364; Referee: Lee Collins

23 August 2014 4	Carlisle United	1–1	Southend United	Carlisle
15:00	Sweeney 43'	Report	Clifford 45+1'	Stadium: Brunton Park; Attendance: 3,847; Referee: Chris Kavanagh

30 August 2014 5	Plymouth Argyle	2–0	Southend United	Plymouth
15:00	Alessandra 52'; Reid 68'	Report	Bolger (red card) 15'	Stadium: Home Park; Attendance: 6,247; Referee: Brendan Malone

6 September 2014 6	Southend United	1–1	Oxford United	Southend-on-Sea
15:00	Atkinson (yellow card) 25'; Thompson (yellow card) 33'; Payne 36'; Leonard (yellow card) 49'; White (yellow card) 68'		Riley (yellow card) 26'; Wright (yellow card) 64'; Hylton 67' (pen.)	Stadium: Roots Hall; Attendance: 5,315; Referee: Andy Davies

13 September 2014 7	Southend United	2–0	Portsmouth	Southend-on-Sea
15:00	Corr 56'; Coulthirst 90'	Report		Stadium: Roots Hall; Attendance: 7,023; Referee: Graham Scott

16 September 2014 8	Cheltenham Town	0–1	Southend United	Cheltenham
19:45	Taylor (red card) 38'	Report	Clifford 52'	Stadium: Whaddon Road; Attendance: 2,303; Referee: James Linington

20 September 2014 9	York City	2–3	Southend United	York
15:00	Penn 45+3'; Winfield 85'	Report	Weston 9' (pen.); Hurst 52'; Payne 78'	Stadium: Bootham Crescent; Attendance: 3,307; Referee: Paul Tierney

27 September 2014 10	Southend United	1–0	Shrewsbury Town	Southend-on-Sea
15:00	Coulthirst 2'	Report	Lawrence (yellow card) 45'; Mangan (yellow card) 58' (yellow-red card) 84'; Collins (yellow card) 65'; Vincent (yellow card) 83'	Stadium: Roots Hall; Attendance: 6,951; Referee: Kevin Johnson

4 October 2014 11	Southend United	0–1	Morecambe	Southend-on-Sea
15:00	Deegan (yellow card) 21'	Report	Redshaw 5'; Beeley (yellow card) 25'; Ellison (yellow card) 90+1'	Stadium: Roots Hall; Attendance: 5,284; Referee: Andy Woolmer

11 October 2014 12	Luton Town	2–0	Southend United	Luton
15:00	Lawless 17'; Cullen 34'; Ruddock (yellow card) 71'; Drury (yellow card) 72'	Report	Atkinson (yellow card) 27'; Thompson (yellow card) 65'; Corr (yellow card) 67'	Stadium: Kenilworth Road; Attendance: 9,238; Referee: Chris Kavanagh

18 October 2014 13	Southend United	1–1	Exeter City	Southend-on-Sea
15:00	Worrall 33'; Binnom-Williams (yellow card) 90+1'	Report	Wheeler (yellow card) 62'; Cummins 77'	Stadium: Roots Hall; Attendance: 5,749; Referee: Phil Gibbs

21 October 2014 14	Newport County	1–0	Southend United	Newport
19:45	Porter (yellow card) 9'; Byrne 74'	Report	Timlin (yellow card) 57'	Stadium: Rodney Parade; Attendance: 2,558; Referee: Keith Hill

25 October 2014 15	Southend United	1–1	Bury	Southend-on-Sea
15:00	Corr 37'; Worrall (yellow card) 73'; Prosser (yellow card) 81'; Payne (yellow card) 84'	Report	Binnom-Williams (yellow card) 51'; Jones 71'; Mills (yellow card) 84'; Tutte (yellow card) 90+1'; Kennedy (yellow card) 90+3'	Stadium: Roots Hall; Attendance: 5,174; Referee: Darren Drysdale

1 November 2014 16	Mansfield Town	1–2	Southend United	Mansfield
15:00	McGuire (yellow card) 21'; Palmer 78'	Report	Leonard 17'; Worrall 69'; Sokolík (yellow card) 90+3'	Stadium: Field Mill; Attendance: 2,719; Referee: Gary Sutton

15 November 2014 17	Southend United	1–0	Hartlepool United	Southend-on-Sea
15:00	Timlin (yellow card) 11'; Worrall 65'	Report	Austin (yellow card) 45+4'; Fenwick (yellow card) 85'	Stadium: Roots Hall; Attendance: 5,436; Referee: Pat Miller

22 November 2014 18	Tranmere Rovers	1–2	Southend United	Tranmere
15:00	Power 53' (pen.); Aimson (yellow card) 75'	Report	Payne 16'; Aimson 23' (o.g.); Bolger (yellow card) 53'; Timlin (yellow card) 62'; Corr (yellow card) 75'	Stadium: Prenton Park; Attendance: 4,621; Referee: Carl Berry

29 November 2014 19	Southend United	2–0	Northampton Town	Southend-on-Sea
15:00	Thompson (yellow card) 28'; Corr 69' (pen.); Prosser (yellow card) 71'; Worrall 79'	Report	Robertson (yellow card) 33'; Byrom (yellow card) 44'; Archer (red card) 67'; Banks (yellow card) 84'	Stadium: Roots Hall; Attendance: 5,500; Referee: Keith Stroud

13 December 2014 20	Wycombe Wanderers	4–1	Southend United	High Wycombe
15:00	Cowan-Hall 32'; McClure 45+1', 72'; Hayes (yellow card) 50'; Jacobson 67'; Mawson (yellow card) 90'	Report	Payne 2'; O'Toole (yellow card) 21'; Binnom-Williams (red card) 61'; Deegan (yellow card) 79'	Stadium: Adams Park; Attendance: 4,123; Referee: Graham Horwood

19 December 2014 21	Southend United	0–0	Burton Albion	Southend-on-Sea
19:45	Prosser (yellow card) 72'	Report	MacDonald (yellow card) 48'; Blyth (yellow card) 68'; Weir (yellow card) 84'	Stadium: Roots Hall; Attendance: 5,266; Referee: Charles Breakspear

26 December 2014 22	Cambridge United	0–1	Southend United	Cambridge
13:00 BST (UTC+01)		Report	Corr 57'; Worrall (yellow card) 73'; Leonard (yellow card) 90'	Stadium: Abbey Stadium; Attendance: 7,053; Referee: Oliver Langford

28 December 2014 23	Southend United	0–0	Dagenham & Redbridge	Southend-on-Sea
15:00 BST (UTC+01)	Bolger (red card) 70'	Report	Chambers (yellow card) 26'; Bingham (yellow card) 35'; Partridge (yellow card) 75'	Stadium: Roots Hall; Attendance: 6,966; Referee: Gavin Ward

3 January 2015 24	Northampton Town	1–1	Southend United	Northampton
15:00 BST (UTC+01)	Cresswell (yellow card) 31'; Holmes (yellow card) 33'; Byrom (yellow card) 38'; Horwood (yellow card) 50'; D'Ath 72'; Richards (yellow card) 77'	Report	Thompson (yellow card) 31'; Coulthirst 47'; Prosser (yellow card) 77' (yellow-red card) 90+6'; Leonard (yellow card) 79'	Stadium: Sixfields Stadium; Attendance: 4,587; Referee: Tim Robinson

10 January 2015 25	Southend United	0–0	Plymouth Argyle	Southend-on-Sea
15:00 BST (UTC+01)		Report	McHugh (yellow card) 66'	Stadium: Roots Hall; Attendance: 5,767; Referee: Darren Handley

17 January 2015 26	Oxford United	2–3	Southend United	Oxford
15:00	O'Dowda 13'; Hoskins (yellow card) 27'; Long 45+1'	Report	Deegan (yellow card) 16' (yellow-red card) 33'; Worrall 25'; Pigott 48'; Corr 82'; Payne (yellow card) 90+1'	Stadium: Kassam Stadium; Attendance: 7,207; Referee: Michael Bull

24 January 2015 27	Portsmouth	1–2	Southend United	Portsmouth
15:00	Webster 24'; McCallum (red card) 90+4'	Report	Leonard 29'; Timlin (yellow card) 43'; Pigott 70'; Corr (yellow card) 78' (yellow-red card) 89'	Stadium: Fratton Park; Attendance: 15,573; Referee: Lee Collins

31 January 2015 28	Southend United	1–0	York City	Southend-on-Sea
15:00	Coulthirst 88' (pen.)	Report	Benning (yellow card) 74'; Halliday (yellow card) 85'	Stadium: Roots Hall; Attendance: 6,126; Referee: Darren Sheldrake

7 February 2015 29	Shrewsbury Town	1–1	Southend United	Shrewsbury
15:00	Grant (yellow card) 52'; Barnett 85'	Report	Payne 54'; Coker (yellow card) 78'	Stadium: New Meadow; Attendance: 5,276; Referee: (England) Carl Boyeson

10 February 2015 30	Southend United	2–0	Cheltenham Town	Southend-on-Sea
19:45	Pigott 9', 34'; Hurst (yellow card) 87'	Report	Wynter (yellow card) 28'; Taylor (yellow card) 34'; Berry (yellow card) 90+1'; Richards (yellow card) 90+5'	Stadium: Roots Hall; Attendance: 5,013; Referee: (England) Carl Berry

14 February 2015 31	Southend United	1–2	Accrington Stanley	Southend-on-Sea
15:00	Corr 72'; Timlin (yellow card) 75'	Report	Procter (yellow card) 41'; Mingoia 53' (yellow card) 66'; Davies (yellow card) 65'; Gornell 71'; Winnard (yellow card) 88'	Stadium: Roots Hall; Attendance: 5,241; Referee: Mick Russell

21 February 2015 32	Stevenage	4–2	Southend United	Stevenage
15:00	Deacon 30'; Walton (yellow card) 56'; Walton 71' (pen.); Kennedy 86'; Parrett 90+5'	Report	Pigott 49'; Corr 56' (pen.); Coker (yellow card) 78'	Stadium: Broadhall Way; Attendance: 3,918; Referee: Geoff Eltringham

28 February 2015 33	Southend United	2–0	Carlisle United	Southend-on-Sea
15:00	Timlin 50'; Corr 72'	Report	Rigg (yellow card) 69'	Stadium: Roots Hall; Attendance: 5,576; Referee: Trevor Kettle

3 March 2015 34	AFC Wimbledon	0–0	Southend United	Kingston upon Thames
19:45		Report		Stadium: Kingsmeadow; Attendance: 3,658; Referee: Graham Scott

7 March 2015 35	Southend United	2–2	Wycombe Wanderers	Southend-on-Sea
15:00	Corr 14', 60'; White (yellow card) 88'; Prosser (yellow card) 90+4'	Report	Bloomfield (yellow card) 27'; Craig 28'; Mawson 85'; Pierre (yellow card) 89'; Murphy (yellow card) 90+4'	Stadium: Roots Hall; Attendance: 6,204; Referee: Tim Robinson

14 March 2015 36	Dagenham & Redbridge	1–3	Southend United	Dagenham
15:00	Obileye 23'; Batt (yellow card) 34'; Doe (yellow card) 90'	Report	Pigott 16'; Timlin (yellow card) 22'; Leonard (yellow card) 43' (goal) 45'; Corr 52' (pen.)	Stadium: Victoria Road; Attendance: 3,393; Referee: Fred Graham

18 March 2015 37	Burton Albion	2–1	Southend United	Burton upon Trent
19:45	Mousinho (yellow card) 23'; Naylor (yellow card) 26'; Weir (red card) 45'; Palmer 56'; El Khayati 89'	Report	Corr 45'; Timlin (yellow card) 50'	Stadium: Pirelli Stadium; Attendance: 2,669; Referee: James Linington

21 March 2015 38	Southend United	0–0	Cambridge United	Southend-on-Sea
15:00	Timlin (yellow card) 90+4'	Report	Donaldson (yellow card) 90+3'	Stadium: Roots Hall; Attendance: 7,224; Referee: Brendan Malone

3 April 2015 39	Southend United	2–0	Mansfield Town	Southend-on-Sea
15:00	Corr 21'; Atkinson 28'	Report		Stadium: Roots Hall; Attendance: 5,925; Referee: Steve Martin

6 April 2015 40	Hartlepool United	0–1	Southend United	Hartlepool
15:00	Jones (yellow card) 67'	Report	Barrett (yellow card) 45+4'; Atkinson 53'; Worrall (yellow card) 72'	Stadium: Victoria Park; Attendance: 5,393; Referee: Graham Salisbury

11 April 2015 41	Southend United	1–0	Tranmere Rovers	Southend-on-Sea
15:00	Corr 38'; Bolger (yellow card) 60'	Report	Jennings (yellow card) 42'; Donacien (yellow card) 76'; Donnelly (yellow card) 84'	Stadium: Roots Hall; Attendance: 5,846; Referee: Graham Horwood

14 April 2015 42	Southend United	2–0	Newport County	Southend-on-Sea
19:45	Bolger 45+2'; McLaughlin 51'	Report		Stadium: Roots Hall; Attendance: 5,480; Referee: Robert Lewis

18 April 2015 43	Exeter City	0–1	Southend United	Exeter
15:00		Report	Barrett (yellow card) 27'; Timlin 90+2'	Stadium: St James Park; Attendance: 4,039; Referee: Darren Handley

21 April 2015 44	Bury	0–1	Southend United	Bury
19:45	Soares (yellow card) 61'; Etuhu (yellow card) 73'; El-Abd (yellow card) 90+4'	Report	Atkinson (yellow card) 11'; Deegan (yellow card) 45'; Worrall 74'	Stadium: Gigg Lane; Attendance: 8,396; Referee: Tony Harrington

25 April 2015 45	Southend United	1–0	Luton Town	Southend-on-Sea
15:00	Coker (red card) 67'; Bolger (yellow card) 71'; Deegan (yellow card) 72'; Timlin 81'	Report	Wilkinson (yellow card) 43'; Doyle (yellow card) 46'	Stadium: Roots Hall; Attendance: 10,730; Referee: Iain Williamson

2 May 2015 46	Morecambe	3–1	Southend United	Morecambe
15:00	Redshaw 4'; Wildig 54'; Devitt 66'	Report	Payne 10'; Deegan (yellow card) 30'	Stadium: Globe Arena; Attendance: 4,108; Referee: James Adcock

==== League Two play-offs ====
10 May 2015 Semi-final 1st Leg	Stevenage	1–1	Southend United	Stevenage
18:35	Deacon (yellow card) 45+9'; Parrett 51'; Lee (yellow card) 48'; Whelpdale (yellow card) 80'	Report	Corr (yellow card) 24' (goal) 60'; Bolger (yellow card) 40'; Worrall (yellow card) 63'; Deegan (yellow card) 85'	Stadium: Broadhall Way; Attendance: 5,183; Referee: Keith Stroud

14 May 2015 Semi-final 2nd Leg	Southend United	3–1 (a.e.t.) (4-2 agg.)	Stevenage	Southend-on-Sea
19:45	Leonard 67'; Coker (yellow card) 90+1'; Barrett (yellow card) 90+4'; McLaughlin 108'; Timlin 120+2'	Report	Pett 55'; Bond (yellow card) 58'; Okimo (yellow card) 70'; Walton (yellow card) 90'; Parrett (yellow card) 90+7'; Kennedy (yellow card) 120+3'	Stadium: Roots Hall; Attendance: 8,998; Referee: Graham Scott

23 May 2015 Final	Southend United	1–1 (a.e.t.) (7–6 p)	Wycombe Wanderers	London
17:30	Bolger (yellow card) 31'; Leonard (yellow card) 114'; Pigott 120+2'	Report	Hayes (yellow card) 22'; Mawson (yellow card) 90'; Wood (yellow card) 114'; Bentley 95' (o.g.)	Stadium: Wembley Stadium, Wembley Park; Attendance: 38,252; Referee: Simon Hooper
	Penalties
	Pigott (penalty scored); Coker (penalty missed); Leonard (penalty scored); Payne (penalty scored); Timlin (penalty scored); Barrett (penalty scored); Weston (penalty scored); Bolger (penalty scored)		Murphy (penalty scored); Mawson (penalty scored); Hayes (penalty scored); Bloomfield (penalty missed); Bean (penalty scored); Jacobson (penalty scored); Amadi-Holloway (penalty scored); Wood (penalty missed)

=== FA Cup ===
The draw for the first round of the FA Cup was made on 27 October 2014.

8 November 2014 First round	Southend United	1–2	Chester	Southend-on-Sea
15:00	Sokolík (yellow card) 28'; Corr 31' (pen.); White (yellow card) 35'; Binnom-Williams (yellow card) 55'; Timlin (yellow card) 82'	Report	Heneghan 5' (yellow card) 84'; Rooney (yellow card) 30'; Mahon 51'; Hobson (yellow card) 75'; Touray (yellow card) 87'	Stadium: Roots Hall; Attendance: 4,047; Referee: Graham Horwood

=== League Cup ===
The draw for the first round was made on 17 June 2014 at 10am. Southend United were drawn at home to Walsall.

12 August 2014 Round One	Southend United	1–2	Walsall	Southend-on-Sea
19:45	Leonard 68'	Report	Benning 25'; Morris 87'	Stadium: Roots Hall; Attendance: 3,146; Referee: Gavin Ward

=== Football League Trophy ===
2 September 2014 Round One	AFC Wimbledon	2–2 (4–2 p)	Southend United	Kingston upon Thames
19:45	Sainte-Luce 16'; Pell (red card) 20'; Barrett 88'	Report	Payne 5', 51'	Stadium: Kingsmeadow; Attendance: 1,495; Referee: Charles Breakspear

== Transfers ==
Players transferred in
Date	Pos.	Name	Previous club	Fee	Ref.
14 June 2014	MF	Myles Weston	Gillingham	Free	
24 June 2014	FW	Lee Barnard	Southampton	Free	
23 July 2014	MF	David Worrall	Rotherham United	Free	
4 August 2014	DF	Mads Ibenfeldt	Akademisk Boldklub	Free	
5 August 2014	DF	Cian Bolger	Bolton Wanderers	£25,000	
5 August 2014	FW	Isaac Layne	Billericay Town	Undisclosed	
22 August 2014	MF	Gary Deegan	Northampton Town	Free	
15 January 2015	MF	Adam Barrett	Gillingham	Free	
Players transferred out
Date	Pos.	Name	To	Fee	Ref.
23 May 2014	DF	Ryan Auger	Bishop's Stortford	Free	
23 May 2014	GK	Luke Chambers	Released	Free	
23 May 2014	FW	Freddy Eastwood	Released	Free	
23 May 2014	MF	Bedsenté Gomis	Sutton United	Free	
23 May 2014	MF	Marc Laird	Tranmere Rovers	Free	
23 May 2014	DF	Mark Phillips	AFC Wimbledon	Free	
12 June 2014	DF	Anthony Straker	York City	Free	
7 August 2014	MF	Mitch Pinnock	Mutual Consent	Free	
23 January 2015	FW	Isaac Layne	Alloa Athletic	Free	
Players loaned in
Date from	Pos.	Name	From	Date to	Ref.
4 August 2014	FW	Shaq Coulthirst	Tottenham Hotspur	4 March 2015	
11 September 2014	DF	Jerome Binnom-Williams	Crystal Palace	9 October 2014	
31 October 2014	DF	Jakub Sokolík	Yeovil Town	3 January 2015	
31 October 2014	FW	Elliot Lee	West Ham United	30 November 2014	
27 November 2014	MF	John-Joe O'Toole	Northampton Town	24 January 2015	
10 January 2015	FW	Joe Pigott	Charlton Athletic	12 February 2015	
15 January 2015	FW	Jake Cassidy	Wolverhampton Wanderers	30 June 2015	
27 March 2015	MF	Stephen McLaughlin	Nottingham Forest	30 June 2015	
Players loaned out
Date from	Pos.	Name	To	Date to	Ref.
31 October 2014	MF	Ellis Brown	Witham Town	29 November 2014	
31 October 2014	DF	Kane Farrell	Witham Town	29 November 2014	
31 October 2014	MF	Dan Matsazuka	Harlow Town	29 November 2014	
31 October 2014	FW	Jason Williams	Chelmsford City	29 November 2014	
31 October 2014	FW	Lee Barnard	Stevenage	29 November 2014	
7 November 2014	MF	Jack Bridge	Soham Town Rangers	6 December 2014	
2 February 2015	FW	Jason Williams	Welling United	30 June 2015	
2 February 2015	MF	Conor Clifford	Barnet	30 June 2015	
