= 2015–16 Southend United F.C. season =

Southend United F.C.
2015–16 season
- Chairman: Ron Martin
- Manager: Phil Brown
- Stadium: Roots Hall
- League One: 14th
- FA Cup: First round
- League Cup: First round (knocked out by Brighton & Hove Albion)
- FL Trophy: Area semi-finals
- Top goalscorer: Jack Payne (9)

The 2015–16 season was Southend United's 110th year in existence and their first season back in League One after gaining promotion the previous season. Along with competing in League One, the club also participated in the FA Cup, League Cup and Football League Trophy. The season covers the period from 1 July 2015 to 30 June 2016.

== Competitions ==
=== Pre-season friendlies ===
On 3 June 2015, Southend United announced their first confirmed pre-season friendly against Charlton Athletic. On 8 June 2015, a friendly against West Ham United. On 11 June 2015, a further two friendlies were announced. Also a trip to Dagenham & Redbridge was confirmed.

15 July 2015 Friendly	Great Wakering Rovers	0–1	Southend United	Great Wakering
19:45 BST		Report	Scott (?)	Stadium: Burroughs Park

18 July 2015 Friendly	Southend United	2–3	West Ham United	Southend-on-Sea
15:00 BST	Hurst 20'; Payne 41'	Report	Payet 26', 29'; Prosser 56' (o.g.)	Stadium: Roots Hall

22 July 2015 Friendly	Canvey Island	0–4	Southend United	Canvey Island
19:45 BST		Report	Williams (?); Bridge (?); Payne (?)	Stadium: The Prospects Stadium

25 July 2015 Friendly	Dagenham & Redbridge	2–1	Southend United	Dagenham
15:00 BST	McClure 45', 54'	Report	Timlin 35'	Stadium: Victoria Road; Attendance: 696 (inc. 278 from Southend)

28 July 2015 Friendly	Southend United	2–1	Charlton Athletic	Southend-on-Sea
19:45 BST	Wordsworth 30'; Mooney 57'	Report	Kennedy 32'	Stadium: Roots Hall

=== League One ===
==== League table ====
Pos	Team	Pld	W	D	L	GF	GA	GD	Pts
12	Port Vale	46	18	11	17	56	58	−2	65
13	Peterborough United	46	19	6	21	82	73	+9	63
14	Southend United	46	16	11	19	58	64	−6	59
15	Swindon Town	46	16	11	19	64	71	−7	59
16	Bury	46	16	12	18	56	73	−17	57 (Note: Bury were deducted 3 points for playing the unregistered Callum Styles against Southend United on 8 May.)

Updated to match(es) played on 1 July 2016. Source: BBC Sport
Rules for classification: 1) Points; 2) Goal difference; 3) Number of goals scored

==== Result by matchday ====
Matchday	1	2	3	4	5	6	7	8	9	10	11	12	13	14	15	16	17	18	19	20	21	22	23	24	25	26	27	28	29	30	31	32	33	34	35	36	37	38	39	40	41	42	43	44	45	46
Ground	A	H	A	H	A	H	H	A	H	A																																				
Result	D	L	D	L	D	W	L	W	W	W																																				
Position	14	21	20	21	20	16	20	17	13	10																																				

Updated to match(es) played on 1 October 2015. Source: Statto.com
A = Away; H = Home; W = Win; D = Draw; L = Loss

==== Matches ====
On 17 June 2015, the fixtures for the forthcoming season were announced.

8 August 2015 1	Fleetwood Town	1–1	Southend United	Fleetwood
15:00 BST	McManus 33'	Report	Worrall 84'	Stadium: Highbury Stadium; Attendance: 3,228; Referee: David Webb

15 August 2015 2	Southend United	0–2	Walsall	Southend-on-Sea
15:00 BST		Report	Bradshaw 8'; Mantom 48'	Stadium: Roots Hall; Attendance: 6,149; Referee: Andy Davies

19 August 2015 3	Doncaster Rovers	0–0	Southend United	Doncaster
19:45 BST		Report		Stadium: Keepmoat Stadium; Attendance: 5,164; Referee: Seb Stockbridge

22 August 2015 4	Southend United	0–1	Swindon Town	Southend-on-Sea
15:00 BST		Report	Robert 62'	Stadium: Roots Hall; Attendance: 5,839; Referee: Andy Woolmer

31 August 2015 5	Coventry City	2–2	Southend United	Coventry
19:45 BST	Johnson 34'; Ricketts 72'	Report	Hunt 36'; Mooney 41' (pen.)	Stadium: Ricoh Arena; Attendance: 12,967; Referee: Darren Handley

5 September 2015 6	Southend United	2–1	Peterborough United	Southend-on-Sea
12:05 BST	Barrett 32'; Hunt 70'	Report	Maddison 90'	Stadium: Roots Hall; Attendance: 5,748; Referee: Simon Hooper

12 September 2015 7	Southend United	0–1	Shrewsbury Town	Southend-on-Sea
15:00 BST		Report	Knight-Percival 56'	Stadium: Roots Hall; Attendance: 5,212; Referee: Dean Whitestone

19 September 2015 8	Millwall	0–2	Southend United	Bermondsey
15:00 BST		Report	Mooney 37'; Barrett 49'	Stadium: New Den; Attendance: 10,228; Referee: Mark Haywood

26 September 2015 9	Southend United	2–1	Scunthorpe United	Southend-on-Sea
15:00 BST	Timlin 36'; Coker 75'	Report	McSheffrey 8'	Stadium: Roots Hall; Attendance: 5,708; Referee: Kevin Johnson

29 September 2015 10	Crewe Alexandra	1–2	Southend United	Crewe
19:45 BST	Inman 49'	Report	Pigott 47', 53'	Stadium: Gresty Road; Attendance: 3,404; Referee: Darren Bond

3 October 2015 11	Burton Albion	1–0	Southend United	Burton upon Trent
15:00 BST	Prosser 51' (o.g.)	Report		Stadium: Pirelli Stadium; Attendance: 2,948; Referee: Trevor Kettle

10 October 2015 12	Southend United	1–0	Port Vale	Southend-on-Sea
15:00	Pigott 63'	Report		Stadium: Roots Hall; Attendance: 6,543; Referee: Iain Williamson

17 October 2015 13	Southend United	2–1	Barnsley	Southend-on-Sea
15:00 BST	Wordsworth 36'; Prosser 43'	Report	Scowen 24' (pen.)	Stadium: Roots Hall; Attendance: 6,572; Referee: Charles Breakspear

20 October 2015 14	Chesterfield	3–0	Southend United	Chesterfield
19:45 BST	Novak 8'; Ebanks-Blake 37' 62'	Report		Stadium: Proact Stadium; Attendance: 5,703; Referee: Graham Salisbury

24 October 2015 15	Gillingham	1–1	Southend United	Gillingham
15:00 BST	Loft 89'	Report	McLaughlin 11'	Stadium: Priestfield Stadium; Attendance: 6,981; Referee: Ben Toner

31 October 2015 16	Southend United	2–2	Rochdale	Southend-on-Sea
19:45 GMT	Mooney 39' (pen.); Leonard 41'	Report	Bunney 63'; Rose 79'	Stadium: Roots Hall; Attendance: 6,111; Referee: Steve Martin

14 November 2015 17	Sheffield United	2–2	Southend	Sheffield
15:00 GMT	Baxter 36'; Collins 45'	Report	Leonard 29'; Payne 31'	Stadium: Bramall Lane; Attendance: 19,007; Referee: Scott Duncan

21 November 2015 18	Southend United	1–0	Blackpool	Southend-on-Sea
15:00 GMT	Thompson 76'	Report		Stadium: Roots Hall; Attendance: 6,290; Referee: Graham Horwood

24 November 2015 19	Oldham Athletic	2–5	Southend	Oldham
19:45 GMT	Higdon 56', 77'	Report	Payne 5'; Mooney 43'; Worrall 48'; Atkinson 78'; Prosser 82'	Stadium: Boundary Park; Attendance: 3,301; Referee: Darren Bond

28 November 2015 20	Southend United	0–0	Wigan	Southend-on-Sea
15:00 GMT		Report		Stadium: Roots Hall; Attendance: 7,117; Referee: Keith Stroud

18 December 2015 21	Southend United	4–1	Bury	Southend-on-Sea
19:45 GMT	Hunt 22', 31'; Mooney 74' (pen.); Payne 78'	Report	L. Clarke 43'	Stadium: Roots Hall; Attendance: 6,127; Referee: James Linington

26 December 2015 22	Colchester United	0–2	Southend United	Colchester
15:00 GMT		Report	White 49'; Mooney 73'	Stadium: Colchester Community Stadium; Attendance: 9,222; Referee: Phil Gibbs

28 December 2015 23	Southend United	0–4	Millwall	Southend-on-Sea
13:00 GMT	Deegan (yellow card) 57'; Mooney (yellow card) 74'; Atkinson (yellow card) 78'	Report	Martin 27'; Cummings 35'; Onyedinma 45+1'; Williams (yellow card) 60'; O'Brien 70'	Stadium: Roots Hall; Attendance: 10,099; Referee: (England) Kevin Wright

2 January 2016 24	Southend United	0–3	Doncaster Rovers	Southend-on-Sea
15:00 GMT	Leonard (yellow card) 50'; Thompson (yellow card) 57'; White (yellow card) 58'; Deegan (yellow card) 90+3'	Report	Williams 44'; Taylor-Sinclair 54'; Tyson 58' (pen.); Alcock (yellow card) 84'	Stadium: Roots Hall; Attendance: 7,134; Referee: (England) Lee Collins

9 January 2016 25	Swindon Town	4–2	Southend United	Swindon
15:00 GMT	Ajose 42' 90'; Obika 45+1' 78'	Report	Barnett 5'; Thompson 13' (yellow card) 90+6'; Deegan (yellow card) 53'; Atkinson (yellow card) 90+2'; Prosser (yellow card) 90+6'	Stadium: County Ground; Attendance: 7,162; Referee: (England) Graham Salisbury

16 January 2016 26	Peterborough United	0–0	Southend United	Peterborough
15:00 GMT		Report	Bolger (yellow card) 29'; Hendrie (yellow card) 79'	Stadium: ABAX Stadium; Attendance: 7,057; Referee: (England) Kevin Johnson

23 January 2016 27	Southend United	3–0	Coventry City	Southend-on-Sea
15:00 GMT	Payne 24'; Barnett 31' 68' (pen.); Deegan (yellow card) 44' (yellow-red card); Bolger (yellow card) 90'	Report	Charles-Cook (yellow card) 66'	Stadium: Roots Hall; Attendance: 8,767; Referee: (England) Brendan Malone

2 February 2016 28	Shrewsbury Town	1–2	Southend United	Shrewsbury
19:45 GMT	Mangan 47'	Report	Atkinson 24'; Timlin (yellow card) 54' (yellow-red card); Hendrie 79'; O'Neill (yellow card) 90+2'; McQueen (yellow card) 90+4'	Stadium: Greenhous Meadow; Attendance: 4,602; Referee: (England) Chris Sarginson

6 February 2016 29	Southend United	3–0	Colchester United	Southend-on-Sea
15:00 GMT	Thompson (yellow card) 5'; Bolger (yellow card) 45'; Wordsworth 82'; Barrett 88' (yellow card) 90'; McQueen (yellow card) 90+2' (goal) 90+3'	Report	Gilbey (red card) 36'	Stadium: Roots Hall; Attendance: 10,279; Referee: (England) Oliver Langford

13 February 2016 30	Scunthorpe United	1–0	Southend United	Scunthorpe
15:00 GMT	Madden 11'	Report	Atkinson (yellow card) 59'; O'Neill (yellow card) 66'; Loza (yellow card) 84'; Bolger (yellow card) 88'	Stadium: Glanford Park; Attendance: 3,550; Referee: (England) David Coote

16 February 2016 31	Bradford City	2–0	Southend United	Bradford
19:45 GMT	McMahon 17'; Darby (yellow card) 66'; Hanson 74'	Report	Timlin (yellow card) 70'; O'Neill (yellow card) 89'; Wordsworth (yellow card) 90+1'	Stadium: Coral Windows Stadium; Attendance: 17,701; Referee: (England) Ross Joyce

22 February 2016 32	Southend United	3–1	Burton Albion	Southend-on-Sea
19:45 GMT	Wordsworth 7'; Barnett 63'; Mooney 90+1'	Report	Beavon 44'	Stadium: Roots Hall; Attendance: 6,503; Referee: (England) Paul Tierney (referee)

26 February 2016 33	Port Vale	3–1	Southend United	Stoke-on-Trent
19:45 GMT	Dickenson 18'; O'Connor 38'; Coker 40' (o.g.); Kennedy (yellow card) 86'	Report	Timlin (yellow card) 38'; Coker (yellow card) 42'; Atkinson (yellow card) 57'; McQueen 90+3'	Stadium: Vale Park; Attendance: 3,957; Referee: (England) Andy Haines

1 March 2016 34	Southend United	1–1	Crewe Alexandra	Southend-on-Sea
19:45 GMT	Wordsworth (yellow card) 58'; Worrall (yellow card) 86'; Barnett (yellow card) 87'; Coker (yellow card) 87'; Payne 90+4' (pen.)	Report	Hitchcock (yellow card) 54'; Cooper 86'	Stadium: Roots Hall; Attendance: 5,444; Referee: (England) Dean Whitestone

5 March 2016 35	Southend United	0–1	Chesterfield	Southend-on-Sea
15:00 GMT	Coker (yellow card) 64'	Report	Banks (yellow card) 59'; Dimaio (yellow card) 88'; Novak 89'	Stadium: Roots Hall; Attendance: 7,518; Referee: (England) Darren Drysdale

12 March 2016 36	Barnsley	0–2	Southend United	Barnsley
15:00 GMT	Winnall (yellow card) 90+4'; Mawson (yellow card) 90+6'	Report	Payne 4'; Bentley (yellow card) 23'; Wordsworth (yellow card) 37'; Timlin 90+6'	Stadium: Oakwell; Attendance: 9,903; Referee: (England) Brendan Malone

19 March 2016 37	Southend United	1–1	Gillingham	Southend-on-Sea
	Wordsworth 21'	Report	Norris 53'	Stadium: Roots Hall; Attendance: 9,135

25 March 2016 38	Rochdale	4–1	Southend United	Rochdale
GMT	Holt 41'; Rafferty 49'; Allen 61'; Bunney 90'	Report	Payne 28'	Stadium: Spotland Stadium; Attendance: 3,018

30 March 2016 39	Southend United	3–1	Sheffield United	Southend-on-Sea
GMT	Barnett 28'; Worrall 60'; Payne 90'	Report	Hammond 34'	Stadium: Roots Hall; Attendance: 7,004

2 April 2016 40	Blackpool	2–0	Southend United	Blackpool
GMT	Cullen 49'; Blyth 79'	Report		Stadium: Bloomfield Road; Attendance: 6,979

9 April 2016 41	Southend United	2–2	Fleetwood Town	Southend-on-Sea
GMT	Barrett 71'; Payne 82'	Report	Grant 53'; McLaughlin 90'	Stadium: Roots Hall; Attendance: 6,644

16 April 2016 42	Walsall	1–0	Southend United	Walsall
GMT	Hiwula 88'	Report		Stadium: Bescot Stadium; Attendance: 5,732

19 April 2016 43	Southend United	0–1	Oldham Athletic	Southend-on-Sea
GMT		Report	Main 66'	Stadium: Roots Hall; Attendance: 6,503

23 April 2016 44	Wigan Athletic	4–1	Southend United	Wigan
GMT	McCann 9'; Grigg 17', 36'; Jacobs 50'	Report	Morgan 74' (o.g.)	Stadium: DW Stadium; Attendance: 10,021

30 April 2016 45	Southend United	0–1	Bradford City	Southend-on-Sea
GMT		Report	Evans 12'	Stadium: Roots Hall; Attendance: 8,571

8 May 2016 46	Bury	3–2	Southend United	Bury
GMT	Barrett 21' (o.g.); Lowe 29', 90'	Report	Moussa 8'; Mooney 23'	Stadium: Gigg Lane; Attendance: 3,575

=== FA Cup ===
On 26th Oct 2015, in the clubhouse of Thackley Juniors FC in West Yorkshire, Southend United were drawn away against Scunthorpe United, to create an earlier travel date to Glanford Park.

7 November 2015 First round	Scunthorpe United	2–1	Southend United	Scunthorpe
15:00 GMT	Madden 16', 78'	Report	Leonard 30'	Stadium: Glanford Park; Attendance: 3,335; Referee: Peter Bankes

=== League Cup ===
On 16 June 2015, the first round draw was made, Southend United were drawn at home against Brighton & Hove Albion.

11 August 2015 First round	Southend United	0–1	Brighton & Hove Albion	Southend-on-Sea
19:45 BST		Report	LuaLua 90'	Stadium: Roots Hall; Attendance: 4,485; Referee: Iain Williamson

=== Football League Trophy ===
On 5 September 2015, the second round draw was shown live on Soccer AM and drawn by Charlie Austin and Ed Skrein. Southend will travel to Crawley Town.

6 October 2015 Second round	Crawley Town	0–3	Southend United	Crawley
19:45 BST		Report	Weston 26'; Pigott 39', 87'	Stadium: Broadfield Stadium; Attendance: 1,139; Referee: Tim Robinson

11 November 2015 Area quarter-finals	Southend United	1–0	Bristol Rovers	Southend-on-Sea
19:45 GMT	White 11'	Report		Stadium: Roots Hall; Attendance: 3,495; Referee: Andy Woolmer

8 December 2015 Area semi-finals	Southend United	0–2	Millwall	Southend-on-Sea
19:45 GMT		Report	Morison 34'; Williams 65'	Stadium: Roots Hall; Attendance: 5,972; Referee: Simon Hooper

== Transfers ==
=== Transfers in ===
Date from	Position	Nationality	Name	From	Fee	Ref.
2 July 2015	CF	IRL	Dave Mooney	Leyton Orient	Free transfer	
3 July 2015	LM	ENG	Anthony Wordsworth	Ipswich Town	Free transfer	
1 August 2015	CF	IRL	Noel Hunt	Ipswich Town	Free transfer	
28 August 2015	LM	IRL	Stephen McLaughlin	Nottingham Forest	Undisclosed	
1 September 2015	RB	ENG	Luke O'Neill	Burnley	Free transfer	
11 September 2015	LB	CYP	Harry Kyprianou	Watford	Free transfer	

=== Transfers out ===
Date from	Position	Nationality	Name	To	Fee	Ref.
1 July 2015	CB	ENG	Josh Banton	Free agent	Released	
1 July 2015	CF	ENG	Lee Barnard	Crawley Town (Note: Following Barnard's release he joined Crawley Town.)	Free transfer	
1 July 2015	MF	ENG	Ellis Brown	Free Agent	Released	
1 July 2015	CM	IRL	Conor Clifford	Free Agent	Released	
1 July 2015	CF	IRL	Barry Corr	Cambridge United	Free transfer	
1 July 2015	LB	ENG	Kane Farrell	Free Agent	Released	
1 July 2015	CB	DEN	Mads Ibenfeldt	Free Agent	Released	
1 July 2015	GK	ENG	Paul Smith	Free Agent	Released	
30 July 2015	LB	ENG	Cameron John	Wolverhampton Wanderers	Undisclosed	

=== Loans in ===
Date from	Position	Nationality	Name	From	Date until	Ref.
8 August 2015	CF	ENG	Joe Pigott	Charlton Athletic	2 January 2016	
22 August 2015	RB	ENG	Luke O'Neill	Burnley	1 September 2015 (Note: On 1 September 2015, O'Neill made his loan move into a permanent move.)	
28 August 2015	DM	IRL	Glen Rea	Brighton & Hove Albion	2 January 2016	
7 January 2016	CF	ENG	Tyrone Barnett	Shrewsbury Town	End of Season	
21 January 2016	MF	ENG	Sam McQueen	Southampton	End of Season	
22 January 2016	MF	FIN	Glen Kamara	Arsenal	End of Season	
