= Jerome Binnom-Williams =

English footballer (born 1995)

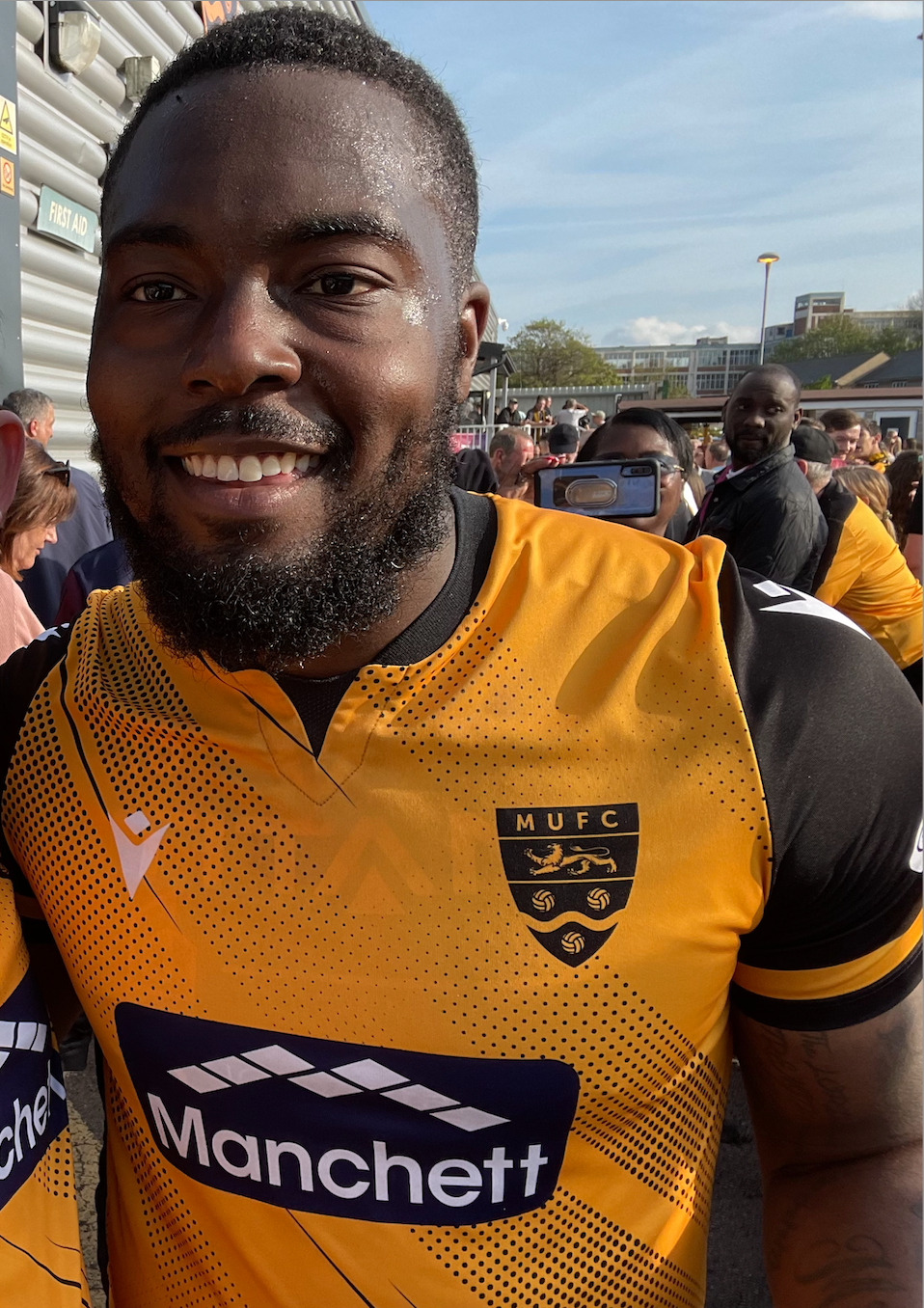

Personal information
- Full name: Jerome Craig Binnom-Williams
- Date of birth: 7 March 1995 (age 31)
- Place of birth: Croydon, England
- Position: Left back

Youth career
- –2013: Crystal Palace

Senior career*
Years	Team	Apps	(Gls)
2013–2016	Crystal Palace	0	(0)
2014	→ Forest Green Rovers (loan)	3	(0)
2014–2015	→ Southend United (loan)	21	(0)
2015–2016	→ Burton Albion (loan)	15	(1)
2016	→ Leyton Orient (loan)	13	(0)
2016–2017	Peterborough United	10	(0)
2017–2019	Chesterfield	52	(1)
2019–2020	FC Halifax Town	25	(3)
2020–2021	Barnet	20	(0)
2021–2023	Maidstone United	49	(5)
2023–2025	Dulwich Hamlet	80	(8)
2025	Ramsgate	15	(0)
2025–2026	AFC Croydon Athletic	22	(1)

International career
2013	England U18	1	(0)
2013	England U19	1	(0)
2018	England C	1	(0)
- * Club domestic league appearances and goals as of 17:47, 26 August 2026 (UTC)

Jerome Craig Binnom-Williams (born 7 March 1995) is an English footballer who plays as a defender.

== Career ==
Binnom-Williams began his career with Crystal Palace and made his professional debut on 27 August 2013 in a 2–1 defeat against Bristol City in the Football League Cup. He joined Forest Green Rovers on a one-month loan deal in January 2014. He made his debut for the club on 9 January 2014 in a televised 1–1 draw with Hereford United.

On 11 September 2014, Binnom-Williams joined Southend United on a one-month loan deal, later extended, firstly by a further two months, and subsequently until the end of the 2014–15 season.

In May 2015, Binnom-Williams signed a new two-year contract with Crystal Palace.

In July 2015, he joined Burton Albion on a season-long loan. Williams was recalled by Crystal Palace in January 2016, having not played for Burton Albion since November.

In February 2016, Binnom-Williams joined Football League Two side Leyton Orient on loan until the end of the season.

On 2 August 2016, Binnom-Williams joined Football League One side Peterborough United on a free transfer.

After his contract at Peterborough was cancelled by mutual consent, Binnom-Williams signed a two-year deal with League Two side Chesterfield in June 2017. Binnom-Williams was released when his contract expired in May 2019.

In August 2019, Binnom-Williams signed for FC Halifax Town of the National League. He was released at the end of the season.

He signed for Barnet on 25 September 2020. He left the club at the end of the 2020–21 season having made 22 appearances.

Binnom-Williams joined Maidstone United in August 2021. He was released by the club at the end of the 2022–23 season.

Following his release from Maidstone, Binnom-Williams joined Dulwich Hamlet in June 2023.

On 2 August 2025, Binnom-Williams joined newly promoted Isthmian League Premier Division club Ramsgate. He departed the club in October 2025.

== Career statistics ==
As of end of 2025–26 season

Appearances and goals by club, season and competition
Club	Season	League			FA Cup		League Cup		Other		Total	
Club	Season	Division	Apps	Goals	Apps	Goals	Apps	Goals	Apps	Goals	Apps	Goals
Crystal Palace	2013–14	Premier League	0	0	0	0	1	0	—		1	0
Crystal Palace	2014–15	Premier League	0	0	0	0	1	0	—		1	0
Crystal Palace	2015–16	Premier League	0	0	0	0	0	0	—		0	0
Crystal Palace	Crystal Palace total		0	0	0	0	2	0	—		2	0
Forest Green Rovers (loan)	2013–14	Conference Premier	3	0	0	0	—		0	0	3	0
Southend United (loan)	2014–15	League Two	21	0	1	0	0	0	0	0	22	0
Burton Albion (loan)	2015–16	League One	15	1	1	0	2	0	1 (Note: Appearances in the Football League Trophy)	0	19	1
Leyton Orient (loan)	2015–16	League Two	13	0	0	0	0	0	0	0	13	0
Peterborough United	2016–17	League One	10	0	2	0	1	0	2	0	15	0
Chesterfield	2017–18	League Two	19	0	0	0	0	0	1	0	20	0
Chesterfield	2018–19	National League	33	1	4	0	0	0	3 (Note: Appearance(s) in FA Trophy)	0	40	1
Chesterfield	Chesterfield total		52	1	4	0	0	0	4	0	60	1
FC Halifax Town	2019–20	National League	25	3	1	0	0	0	0	0	26	3
Barnet	2020–21	National League	20	0	2	0	0	0	0	0	22	0
Maidstone United	2021–22	National League South	30	4	0	0	0	0	0	0	30	4
Maidstone United	2022–23	National League	19	1	0	0	0	0	4	1	23	2
Maidstone United	Maidstone total		49	5	0	0	0	0	4	1	53	6
Dulwich Hamlet	2023–24	Isthmian League Premier Division	32	5	1	0	—		3 (Note: One appearance in London Senior Cup, two appearances in FA Trophy)	0	36	5
Dulwich Hamlet	2024–25	Isthmian League Premier Division	32	1	1	0	—		1	0	34	1
Dulwich Hamlet	Total		64	6	2	0	0	0	4	0	70	6
Ramsgate	2025–26	Isthmian League Premier Division	13	0	0	0	—		2 (Note: One appearance in Kent Senior Cup, one appearance in FA Trophy)	0	15	0
AFC Croydon Athletic	2025–26	Isthmian League South East Division	22	1	0	0	—		0	0	22	1
Career total			307	17	13	0	5	0	17	1	342	18
