= Amadou Ba (footballer) =

French professional footballer (born 1998)

Personal information
- Full name: Amadou Ba
- Date of birth: 15 February 1998 (age 28)
- Place of birth: Le Havre, France
- Position: Forward

Team information
- Current team: UR La Louvière
- Number: 9

Senior career*
Years	Team	Apps	(Gls)
2015–2017	Le Havre II	7	(2)
2017–2019	Southend United	5	(0)
2018	→ Dartford (loan)	3	(0)
2019–2020	Le Havre II	11	(2)
2020–2021	FC 93		
2021–	UR La Louvière	41	(7)
- * Club domestic league appearances and goals as of 19:09, 25 January 2023 (UTC)

Amadou Ba (born 15 February 1998) is a French professional footballer who plays as a forward for UR La Louvière.

== Career ==
After playing for Le Havre II, Ba signed for English club Southend United in August 2017. He signed on loan for Dartford in September 2018.

He was released by Southend at the end of the 2018–19 season.

== Career statistics ==
As of 26 March 2019

Club	Season	League		FA Cup		League Cup		Other		Total	
Club	Season	Apps	Goals	Apps	Goals	Apps	Goals	Apps	Goals	Apps	Goals
Le Havre II	2015–16	1	1	0	0	0	0	0	0	1	1
Le Havre II	2016–17	6	1	0	0	0	0	0	0	6	1
Le Havre II	Total	7	2	0	0	0	0	0	0	7	2
Southend United	2017–18	5	0	0	0	1	0	4	0	10	0
Southend United	2018–19	0	0	0	0	1	0	1	0	2	0
Southend United	Total	5	0	0	0	2	0	6	0	12	0
Dartford (loan)	2018–19	3	0	0	0	0	0	0	0	3	0
Career total		15	2	0	0	2	0	5	0	22	2
