= Ryan Leonard (footballer) =

English footballer

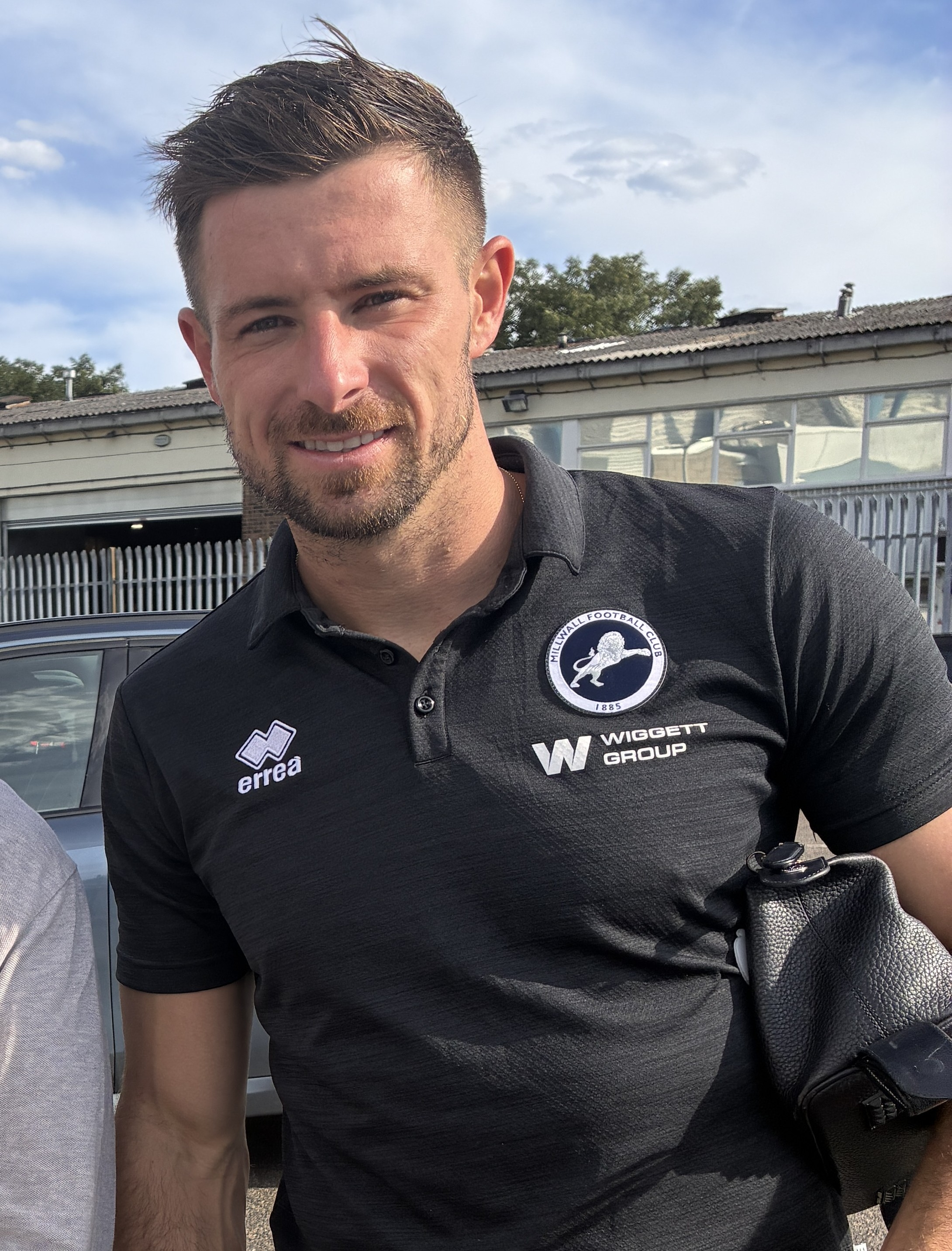
- Leonard in 2026

Personal information
- Full name: Ryan Ian Leonard
- Date of birth: 24 May 1992 (age 34)
- Place of birth: Plympton, England
- Height: 6 ft 1 in (1.85 m)
- Positions: Defender; midfielder

Team information
- Current team: Millwall
- Number: 18

Youth career
- 2001–2010: Plymouth Argyle

Senior career*
| Years | Team | Apps | (Gls) |
| 2010–2011 | Plymouth Argyle | 1 | (0) |
| 2010–2011 | → Weston-super-Mare (loan) | 5 | (0) |
| 2011 | → Tiverton Town (loan) | 18 | (0) |
| 2011–2018 | Southend United | 228 | (20) |
| 2018–2019 | Sheffield United | 16 | (0) |
| 2018–2019 | → Millwall (loan) | 19 | (2) |
| 2019– | Millwall | 188 | (3) |
- * Club domestic league appearances and goals as of 17:24, 9 May 2026 (UTC)

Ryan Ian Leonard (born 24 May 1992) is an English professional footballer who plays as a defender or midfielder for EFL Championship club Millwall.

A midfielder, he graduated through the Plymouth Argyle Academy to make his senior debut in March 2010, following which he spent time on loan at Weston-super-Mare of the League South and Tiverton Town of the Southern Football League. In July 2011, he moved to Southend United, and after establishing himself in the first team in the 2013–14 season, he won the club's Player of the Year Award in 2014. He helped the club to secure promotion out of League Two in 2014–15.

== Career ==
=== Plymouth Argyle ===
Born in Plympton, England Leonard was a graduate from Ivybridge Community College, he signed for Plymouth Argyle in June 2001 as a schoolboy. He progressed through the club's Centre of Excellence to be rewarded with a two-year apprenticeship at the end of the 2007–08. Regarded as one for the future. His elevation to training regularly with the club's first-team coincided with the return of former player Paul Mariner to Plymouth Argyle and, despite still being an apprentice, he made his first-team debut for the club on 27 March 2010 against Blackpool at Home Park.

=== Loans to Weston-super-Mare and Tiverton Town ===
Leonard joined Weston-super-Mare on loan in December 2010, where he made five appearances in the Conference South.

In January 2011, he joined Tiverton Town on loan for one month, which was then extended until the end of April.

=== Return to Plymouth Argyle ===
Leonard was released by Plymouth Argyle at the end of the 2010–11 season.

=== Southend United ===
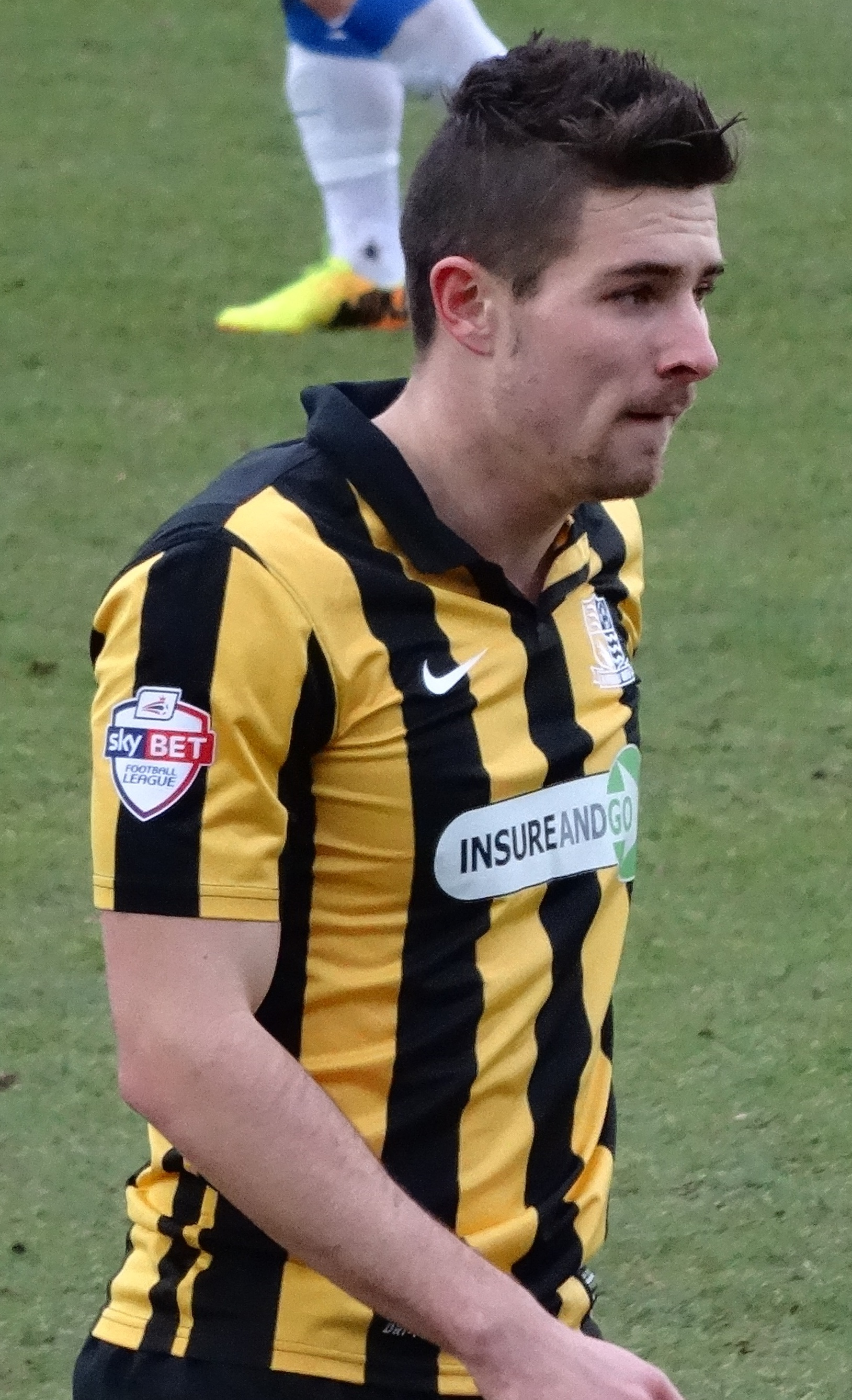
Leonard playing for Southend United in 2014.

Leonard signed a one-year deal with Southend United on 27 July 2011, with the option of a further year after impressing on trial. Leonard scored three goals during Southend's pre-season, including one from inside his own half.

On 7 March 2014, Leonard signed a new three-and-a-half-year contract extension with Southend. At the end of the 2014–15 season he played for Southend in the League Two play-off final against Wycombe Wanderers. Southend won in a penalty shoot-out and were promoted to League One. Leonard scored his penalty in the shootout.

Leonard was voted Player of the Season at the end of the 2015–16 season, the second time he has claimed the award after also winning in 2013–14.

At the end of the 2016–17 season, Leonard became only the second player in Southend history, after Ron Pountney, to win the Player of the Season award three times. Leonard also scooped awards for Players' Player and Goal of the Season.

=== Sheffield United ===
On 5 January 2018, Southend announced that terms had been agreed with Championship club Sheffield United for Leonard's transfer. Leonard agreed terms with the Blades on 6 January, and it was reported he would join them subject to completing a medical. Leonard signed for Sheffield United on 9 January 2018 and was unveiled as a player on the same day.

=== Millwall ===
On 31 August 2018, Leonard signed for Millwall initially on loan, but the deal became permanent in January for a club record fee of £1.5 million.

== Personal life ==
His father, David, is a former player who played for Tiverton Town. Having worked as a coach at Plymouth Argyle's Centre of Excellence, he has managed numerous clubs in the South West of England, including Liskeard Athletic, Plymouth Parkway and Truro City.

== Career statistics ==
As of match played 11 May 2026

Appearances and goals by club, season and competition
| Club | Season | League | | | FA Cup | | League Cup | | Other | | Total | |
| Club | Season | Division | Apps | Goals | Apps | Goals | Apps | Goals | Apps | Goals | Apps | Goals |
|---|---|---|---|---|---|---|---|---|---|---|---|---|
| Plymouth Argyle | 2009–10 | Championship | 1 | 0 | 0 | 0 | 0 | 0 | — | | 1 | 0 |
| Weston-super-Mare (loan) | 2010–11 | Conference South | 5 | 0 | 0 | 0 | — | | — | | 5 | 0 |
| Tiverton Town (loan) | 2010–11 | Southern Football League | 18 | 1 | 0 | 0 | — | | — | | 18 | 1 |
| Southend United | 2011–12 | League Two | 17 | 1 | 2 | 0 | 0 | 0 | 4 (Note: Three appearances in Football League Trophy and one in League Two play-offs) | 0 | 23 | 1 |
| Southend United | 2012–13 | League Two | 22 | 2 | 2 | 0 | 1 | 0 | 3 (Note: Appearances in Football League Trophy) | 1 | 28 | 3 |
| Southend United | 2013–14 | League Two | 43 | 5 | 3 | 2 | 1 | 0 | 2 (Note: Appearances in League Two play-offs) | 1 | 49 | 8 |
| Southend United | 2014–15 | League Two | 41 | 3 | 1 | 0 | 1 | 1 | 4 (Note: One appearance in Football League Trophy and three in League Two play-offs) | 1 | 47 | 5 |
| Southend United | 2015–16 | League One | 37 | 2 | 1 | 1 | 1 | 0 | 2 | 0 | 41 | 3 |
| Southend United | 2016–17 | League One | 43 | 3 | 1 | 0 | 1 | 0 | 3 (Note: Appearances in EFL Trophy) | 0 | 48 | 3 |
| Southend United | 2017–18 | League One | 25 | 4 | 1 | 0 | 1 | 0 | 1 | 0 | 28 | 4 |
| Southend United | Total | | 228 | 20 | 11 | 3 | 6 | 1 | 19 | 3 | 264 | 27 |
| Sheffield United | 2017–18 | Championship | 13 | 0 | 0 | 0 | 0 | 0 | — | | 13 | 0 |
| Sheffield United | 2018–19 | Championship | 3 | 0 | 1 | 0 | 0 | 0 | — | | 4 | 0 |
| Sheffield United | Total | | 16 | 0 | 1 | 0 | 0 | 0 | — | | 17 | 0 |
| Millwall (loan) | 2018–19 | Championship | 19 | 2 | 0 | 0 | 0 | 0 | — | | 19 | 2 |
| Millwall | 2018–19 | Championship | 18 | 0 | 4 | 0 | 0 | 0 | — | | 22 | 0 |
| Millwall | 2019–20 | Championship | 17 | 1 | 0 | 0 | 1 | 0 | — | | 18 | 1 |
| Millwall | 2020–21 | Championship | 26 | 1 | 2 | 0 | 2 | 1 | — | | 30 | 2 |
| Millwall | 2021–22 | Championship | 19 | 0 | 0 | 0 | 2 | 0 | — | | 21 | 0 |
| Millwall | 2022–23 | Championship | 17 | 0 | 0 | 0 | 1 | 0 | — | | 18 | 0 |
| Millwall | 2023–24 | Championship | 35 | 0 | 1 | 0 | 1 | 0 | — | | 37 | 0 |
| Millwall | 2024–25 | Championship | 33 | 0 | 1 | 0 | 2 | 0 | — | | 36 | 0 |
| Millwall | 2025–26 | Championship | 23 | 1 | 1 | 0 | 2 | 2 | 2 (Note: Appearances in EFL Championship play-offs) | 0 | 28 | 3 |
| Millwall | Total | | 188 | 3 | 9 | 0 | 11 | 3 | 2 | 0 | 210 | 6 |
| Career total | | | 475 | 26 | 21 | 3 | 17 | 4 | 21 | 3 | 534 | 36 |

== Honours ==
Southend United

- Football League Two play-offs: 2015

Individual

- Southend United Player of the Year: 2013–14, 2015–16, 2016–17
- Millwall Player of the Season: 2023–24
