= David Worrall =

English footballer (born 1990)

Personal information
- Full name: David Richard Worrall
- Date of birth: 12 June 1990 (age 36)
- Place of birth: Manchester, England
- Height: 6 ft 0 in (1.83 m)
- Positions: Midfielder; winger; wing-back

Team information
- Current team: Trafford

Youth career
- 2005–2007: Bury

Senior career*
| Years | Team | Apps | (Gls) |
| 2006–2007 | Bury | 1 | (0) |
| 2007–2010 | West Bromwich Albion | 0 | (0) |
| 2008 | → Accrington Stanley (loan) | 4 | (0) |
| 2009 | → Shrewsbury Town (loan) | 9 | (0) |
| 2009–2010 | → Bury (loan) | 19 | (3) |
| 2010–2013 | Bury | 143 | (8) |
| 2013–2014 | Rotherham United | 3 | (1) |
| 2014 | → Oldham Athletic (loan) | 18 | (1) |
| 2014–2016 | Southend United | 73 | (9) |
| 2016–2017 | Millwall | 33 | (1) |
| 2017–2023 | Port Vale | 216 | (19) |
| 2023–2026 | Barrow | 40 | (0) |
| 2024–2025 | → Curzon Ashton (loan) | 5 | (1) |
| 2025 | → Kidderminster Harriers (loan) | 13 | (1) |
| 2026– | Trafford | 0 | (0) |
- * Club domestic league appearances and goals

David Richard Worrall (born 12 June 1990) is an English former professional football player who plays for North West Counties League Premier Division club Trafford. He is a versatile, aggressive player who can play wide right or in central midfield.

Worrall began his career at Bury, making his first-team debut at 16 in November 2006. He was sold to West Bromwich Albion for a £50,000 fee in March 2007. However, he would only play one League Cup match for the club. He spent time on loan at Accrington Stanley and Shrewsbury Town during the 2008–09 season before he re-signed with Bury in January 2010 following a loan spell. He was named Bury's Young Player of the Year in 2009–10, helped the club to win promotion out of League Two in 2010–11, and was voted the club's Player of the Year in 2011–12. However, Bury were relegated at the end of the 2012–13 season, and he moved on to Rotherham United in June 2013.

Worrall spent the second half of the 2013–14 campaign on loan at Oldham Athletic and signed with Southend United in July 2014. He was named as League Two Player of the Month for November 2014 and helped Southend to secure promotion out of League Two via the play-offs in 2015. He joined Millwall in June 2016 and helped the club to secure promotion out of League One in 2017. He signed with Port Vale in August 2017 and was named the club's Player of the Year for 2019–20 and on the 2020–21 EFL League Two Team of the Season. He helped the club to win promotion out of League Two via the play-offs in 2022. He agreed a deal with Barrow in May 2023. He joined Curzon Ashton and Kidderminster Harriers on loan in the 2024–25 season. He became a player-coach at Barrow in June 2025. He retired from playing in January 2026 after a 20-year career and 49 goals in 665 league and cup appearances, though came out of retirement to join Trafford six months later.

== Career ==
=== Bury ===
Worrall began his career at Bury, where manager Chris Casper handed Worrall his first-team debut when Worrall was just 16-years old; he came on as an 81st-minute substitute for Jake Speight in a 2–0 defeat to Bristol Rovers at Gigg Lane on 18 November 2006. This proved to be his only appearance of the 2006–07 season, as he was sold by the "Shakers" before the end of the League Two campaign.

=== West Bromwich Albion ===
On 30 March 2007, Worrall joined West Bromwich Albion for a £50,000 fee and signed on scholarship forms until the end of the 2006–07 season. In July 2007 he signed a three-year professional contract, becoming a member of West Brom's first-team squad. He suffered a poor start to his professional career, being sent off in a 2007–08 pre-season friendly with Hajduk Split; however, manager Tony Mowbray said it was a "very harsh decision" and that 17-year-old Worrall "looks like he's got all the right things you need to make it to the top". He made his Albion debut after coming on as a 75th-minute substitute for Filipe Teixeira in a 1–0 League Cup victory over AFC Bournemouth at The Hawthorns on 14 August. This was his only appearance of the 2007–08 season, as the "Baggies" went on to secure promotion out of the Championship into the Premier League.

On 22 August 2008, Worrall joined John Coleman's League Two side Accrington Stanley on a one-month loan. He made his debut for Stanley the following day after coming on as a late substitute in a 2–0 win over Macclesfield Town at the Crown Ground. He played a total of five games for the club before he was forced to return to West Brom for a hernia operation.

On 24 February 2009, Worrall joined fellow West Brom teammate, Luke Daniels, on an initial one-month loan at Shrewsbury Town; manager Paul Simpson said that "there is no guarantee that he will go straight into the side [but] he's an enthusiastic, fit footballer who has good technical ability and I just feel that we need a little burst of enthusiasm and some legs in there who will make a difference for us". After he made six League Two appearances for the "Shrews", the loan was extended to keep him at the New Meadow until the end of the 2008–09 season. Shrewsbury qualified for the play-offs after finishing in seventh-place, and Worrall helped them to overcome former club Bury in the semi-finals to face Gillingham at Wembley Stadium. He was dropped to the bench for the final but came on as a 74th-minute substitute for Paul Murray, before Shrewsbury conceded a goal in the final minute of the game to lose 1–0.

=== Return to Bury ===
On 6 August 2009, Worrall rejoined League Two club Bury on loan. He scored his first goal in the English Football League in 2–0 win over Lincoln City at Gigg Lane on 26 September. The loan deal was made permanent on a free transfer after he signed a two-and-a-half-year contract with Bury on 8 January 2010. Manager Alan Knill said that "I think that he will settle in well and hopefully use Bury as a stepping stone for his career. He is a good age (19) for us and I think that he can go on to better things". He went on to score five goals from 42 appearances as Bury posted a ninth-place finish in 2009–10, just three points outside the play-off places. He was named Bury's Young Player of the Year and said that though he enjoyed his new position on the wings, he hoped to return to central midfield later in his career after gaining more experience and match awareness.

He scored two goals from 27 starts and 17 substitute appearances across the 2010–11 campaign as Bury secured promotion with a second-place finish. The second of his goals came in Bury's 3–2 win over league leaders Chesterfield on 25 April, a game which confirmed Bury's promotion into League One. In October 2011, he signed a contract extension to keep him tied to Bury until June 2014. He remained a first-team regular in League One despite short spells of injury and illness. He scored three goals from 45 matches as Bury posted a 14th-place finish in the 2011–12 season. He was voted the club's Player of the Season, and dedicated the award to central midfielders Steven Schumacher and Peter Sweeney.

The 2012–13 season proved to be a disaster, however, as manager Richie Barker left days before the opening day. Worrall was then rushed to hospital after colliding with teammate Steven Schumacher in a 2–1 defeat at Doncaster Rovers on 21 August. However, initial fears of a broken ankle proved unfounded as a scan showed no serious damage had been done. Kevin Blackwell was appointed as manager ahead of caretaker Peter Shirtliff, though he was unable to prevent the club from being relegated; Blackwell appointed Worrall as stand-in captain, and Worrall said that "I'm sorry for the gaffer and very disappointed in the people above him". Speaking in April 2013, Worrall criticised the club's board of directors, blaming them for the club's relegation and claiming that there had been no communication with the players in regards to the club's precarious financial position.

=== Rotherham United ===
On 20 June 2013, Worrall joined newly promoted League One side Rotherham United on a two-year deal with the option of a third year; the transfer fee was undisclosed, but was reported to be a six-figure sum. Manager Steve Evans stated that "he will be a key player for us". He scored his first and only goal for the "Millers" in a 2–1 victory at Crawley Town on 17 August. However, he suffered a groin injury not long afterwards and was sidelined after undergoing a hernia operation.

On 3 January 2014, Worrall joined divisional rivals Oldham Athletic on loan until the end of the 2013–14 season. Oldham manager Lee Johnson stated that he would later "like to come to some kind of agreement" to sign the player permanently. Worrall scored his first for the "Latics" in his second appearance for the club on 25 January, scoring the second goal of a 5–4 comeback win over Peterborough United at Boundary Park with a finish into the top right-hand corner on the edge of the box. In April, he stated that he would love to stay at Oldham, saying "I would love to stay here, the staff, the gaffer and the lads know that and I think it would be a good move for me". He made 18 appearances for Oldham as the club posted a 15th-place finish, whilst parent club Rotherham secured promotion with a penalty shoot-out victory over Leyton Orient in the play-off final.

=== Southend United ===
On 23 July 2014, Worrall returned to League Two by signing a two-year contract with Southend United after his contract at the New York Stadium was cancelled by mutual consent. He was given the League Two Player of the Month award for November after scoring three goals and providing two assists to help the "Seasiders" to win all four of their league fixtures that month. On 21 April, he scored the only goal of the game from a free kick at former club Bury to keep Southend in contention for a finish in the automatic promotion places; he dedicated the goal to his baby son, Noah, who had recently died. Southend ended up finishing in fifth-place, though Worrall said the play-off games would help him to move on following his son's death. The "Shrimpers" secured promotion after beating Wycombe Wanderers on penalties in the play-off final; Worrall started the game but was substituted in extra time. In total he scored six goals from 44 appearances during the 2014–15 campaign.

He was linked with a return to Bury in January 2016, and a swap deal with Danny Mayor was discussed. He was offered a new contract by the "Blues", but was even more strongly linked with Bury following Southend's 3–2 defeat at Gigg Lane on the final day of the season, and manager Phil Brown said he "thought David Worrall showed where he really wants to be [when] their fans virtually chair-lifted him off the pitch at the end of the game". He scored three goals from 40 appearances across the 2015–16 campaign, helping Southend to a 14th-place finish, before he left Roots Hall in the summer.

=== Millwall ===
On 15 June 2016, Worrall signed a two-year contract with Millwall, with the option of a further 12 months. He scored his first goal for the "Lions" in a 2–2 draw at Milton Keynes Dons on 13 August. He scored two goals from 41 appearances across the 2016–17 season, though he was mainly a substitute as he started only 17 matches. He was an unused substitute in the play-off final as Millwall secured promotion with a 1–0 victory over Bradford City. However, he found himself behind Jed Wallace and Fred Onyedinma in the pecking order at The Den, and his contract was cancelled by mutual consent on 22 August 2017.

=== Port Vale ===
On 24 August 2017, Worrall signed a two-year contract with newly relegated League Two side Port Vale. Manager Michael Brown said that "his experience speaks for itself... and hopefully he can use his experience and be another leader and that's certainly what we need at this football club". Brown was sacked after a poor start to the 2017–18 season, though Worrall maintained his first-team place as one of the side's most creative players under new "Valiants" manager Neil Aspin. On 16 December, he provided assists for two goals at Carlisle United to help secure a 2–1 win and was named on the EFL Team of the Week. On 27 January, he scored both Vale's goals as they twice came from behind to claim a 2–2 draw with Colchester United at Vale Park and was again named on the EFL Team of the Week. However, Worrall stated that it was "a nowhere-near-good-enough season" and "as a team and a squad we were nowhere near it".

He also struggled for form at the start of the 2018–19 season – not helped by a change in formation and his sustaining whiplash in a car accident – and, speaking in November, Aspin said that Worrall needed to work harder to regain his first-team place. He was sometimes made to train with the youth team. However, it was only after John Askey replaced Aspin as manager in January that Worrall began to find his form again. He agreed a new contract in May 2019, ahead of offers from other clubs.

He started the 2019–20 season playing in central midfield in a 4–3–3 formation as Manny Oyeleke picked up an injury, and himself played with a face mask on after having his nose broken in a 1–1 draw with Salford City. On 23 November, he was sent off after the final whistle in a 2–1 defeat at Scunthorpe United for a confrontation with Matty Lund. Askey returned him to the starting eleven after his suspension was served and Worrall told the media that "I love it here... this club seems to be perfect. I feel the way the manager wants me to play suits me down to a tee". He made his 100th appearance for the club in a 4–1 loss at Manchester City in the FA Cup third round on 4 January. He signed a new two-and-a-half-year contract the following month. He also began coaching in the club's academy. After a public vote held in February 2020, he was named by The Sentinel as Port Vale's best winger of the 2010s with 44% of the vote, ahead of Jennison Myrie-Williams (32%). He had the second-highest key passes – defined as the final pass leading to a shot at goal from a teammate – average in English football at the point the 2019–20 League Two season was ended. He won Port Vale's Player of the Year award, as well as the Supporter's Club award, the Away Travel Player of the Year award, and a joint Player's Player of the Year award (with Luke Joyce).

Worrall was one of League Two's leading assist makers in the 2020–21 campaign, ending with ten assists from 37 league games, behind only Carlisle United's Callum Guy on 14. He was named on the League Two Team of the Week for his performance during the 6–3 win at Bolton Wanderers on 5 December. He was named as Official Away Travel Player of the Year at the club's end of season awards. He was named on the League Two Team of the Season at the EFL's end-of-season awards. He was also named on the League Two Team of the Season at the EFL Awards.

He began the 2021–22 season playing at right-wing-back, in what was a controversial decision by new manager Darrell Clarke that paid dividends after Worrall adjusted well to his new role as he stated that "I am still getting in good positions, getting crosses in and being dangerous". Despite struggling with a hip injury, he managed to make 50 appearances in the season, with James Gibbons ruled out for long periods with injury and unable to allow Worrall to be rested. Worrall started in the play-off final at Wembley Stadium, claiming an assist for Mal Benning as Vale secured promotion with a 3–0 victory over Mansfield Town; Michael Baggaley of The Sentinel wrote that "[Worrall was a] constant threat from right wing back ran himself into the ground but also delivered plenty of quality". Worrall said it was the best of his promotions.

Worrall made the 500th league appearance (including play-off games) of his career on 15 October 2022, and after the game spoke of his love for the club and said that "since the gaffer [Clarke] has come in, I have changed as a person, my lifestyle – I take football a lot more seriously". He provided what the club website described as "one of the passes of the season" for Danny Butterworth to score in a 1–0 win over Charlton Athletic on 19 November. However, he picked up an injury the following month which saw him sidelined for three weeks. He score his first league goal of the season on 7 February, in a 1–1 draw with Accrington Stanley. He underwent "lengthy conversations" with the club over a new contract, before his departure was announced in May 2023; David Flitcroft, the club's director of football, stated that the club offered a one-year contract but Worrall had found the security of a two-year deal elsewhere.

=== Barrow ===
On 18 May 2023, League Two side Barrow announced that Worrall would join the club on a two-year deal on 1 July, becoming manager Pete Wild's first signing of the summer. Winger Sean Etaluku described him as a "good mentor" in February 2024. Worrall featured 34 times in the 2023–24 campaign.

On 1 November 2024, he joined National League North club Curzon Ashton on loan. He scored one goal in seven games for the Nash. On 25 February 2025, Worrall returned to the National League North on a month-long loan at Kidderminster Harriers. He picked up five assists in six starts as his loan spell was extended until the end of the 2024–25 season. He played 14 games, including the play-off semi-final defeat to Chester. He returned to Barrow, where he was offered a role as player-coach. He signed a new one-year deal as a player/coach in June. Manager Andy Whing said he was "vital for the dressing room". He retired as a player on 22 January 2026, staying on at Barrow as a full-time coach. He departed his coaching role following relegation at the end of the 2025–26 season.

=== Trafford ===
On 9 June 2026, Worrall agreed to join North West Counties League Premier Division club Trafford after his Barrow contract came to an end on 1 July.

== Style of play ==
Worrall was an attacking midfielder, able to play wide right, as a creative central midfielder, on the right-wing or at right wing-back. Port Vale teammate Tom Pope described him as a hard-working and extremely fit player whose directness allowed him to get the ball into the opposition penalty box early.

== Personal life ==
Worrall supported Manchester United as a boy.

== Career statistics ==
Appearances and goals by club, season and competition
| Club | Season | League | | | FA Cup | | League Cup | | Other | | Total | |
| Club | Season | Division | Apps | Goals | Apps | Goals | Apps | Goals | Apps | Goals | Apps | Goals |
|---|---|---|---|---|---|---|---|---|---|---|---|---|
| Bury | 2006–07 | League Two | 1 | 0 | 0 | 0 | 0 | 0 | 0 | 0 | 1 | 0 |
| West Bromwich Albion | 2007–08 | Championship | 0 | 0 | 0 | 0 | 1 | 0 | — | | 1 | 0 |
| West Bromwich Albion | 2008–09 | Premier League | 0 | 0 | 0 | 0 | 0 | 0 | — | | 0 | 0 |
| West Bromwich Albion | 2009–10 | Championship | 0 | 0 | 0 | 0 | 0 | 0 | — | | 0 | 0 |
| West Bromwich Albion | Total | | 0 | 0 | 0 | 0 | 1 | 0 | 0 | 0 | 1 | 0 |
| Accrington Stanley (loan) | 2008–09 | League Two | 4 | 0 | — | | — | | 1 (Note: Appearance(s) in the Football League Trophy / EFL Trophy.) | 0 | 5 | 0 |
| Shrewsbury Town (loan) | 2008–09 | League Two | 9 | 0 | 0 | 0 | 0 | 0 | 3 (Note: Appearance(s) in the play-offs.) | 0 | 12 | 0 |
| Bury | 2009–10 | League Two | 40 | 4 | 0 | 0 | 0 | 0 | 2 | 1 | 42 | 5 |
| Bury | 2010–11 | League Two | 40 | 2 | 2 | 0 | 1 | 0 | 1 | 0 | 44 | 2 |
| Bury | 2011–12 | League One | 41 | 3 | 1 | 0 | 2 | 0 | 1 | 0 | 45 | 3 |
| Bury | 2012–13 | League One | 41 | 2 | 3 | 0 | 1 | 0 | 1 | 0 | 46 | 2 |
| Bury | Total | | 162 | 11 | 6 | 0 | 4 | 0 | 5 | 1 | 177 | 12 |
| Rotherham United | 2013–14 | League One | 3 | 1 | 0 | 0 | 1 | 0 | 0 | 0 | 4 | 1 |
| Oldham Athletic (loan) | 2013–14 | League One | 18 | 1 | — | | — | | — | | 18 | 1 |
| Southend United | 2014–15 | League Two | 38 | 6 | 1 | 0 | 1 | 0 | 4 (Note: 1 appearance in the EFL Trophy and 3 appearances in the play-offs) | 0 | 44 | 6 |
| Southend United | 2015–16 | League One | 35 | 3 | 1 | 0 | 1 | 0 | 3 | 0 | 40 | 3 |
| Southend United | Total | | 73 | 9 | 2 | 0 | 2 | 0 | 7 | 0 | 84 | 9 |
| Millwall | 2016–17 | League One | 33 | 1 | 3 | 0 | 2 | 0 | 3 | 1 | 41 | 2 |
| Millwall | 2017–18 | Championship | 0 | 0 | 0 | 0 | 1 | 0 | — | | 1 | 0 |
| Millwall | Total | | 33 | 1 | 3 | 0 | 3 | 0 | 3 | 1 | 42 | 2 |
| Port Vale | 2017–18 | League Two | 40 | 4 | 3 | 0 | — | | 1 | 0 | 44 | 4 |
| Port Vale | 2018–19 | League Two | 25 | 1 | 0 | 0 | 1 | 0 | 3 | 0 | 29 | 1 |
| Port Vale | 2019–20 | League Two | 34 | 4 | 2 | 1 | 1 | 0 | 2 | 0 | 39 | 5 |
| Port Vale | 2020–21 | League Two | 37 | 5 | 1 | 0 | 2 | 0 | 2 | 0 | 42 | 5 |
| Port Vale | 2021–22 | League Two | 41 | 4 | 3 | 0 | 1 | 0 | 5 (Note: 2 appearances in the EFL Trophy and 3 appearances in the play-offs) | 0 | 50 | 4 |
| Port Vale | 2022–23 | League One | 39 | 1 | 1 | 0 | 0 | 0 | 4 | 1 | 44 | 2 |
| Port Vale | Total | | 216 | 19 | 10 | 1 | 5 | 0 | 17 | 1 | 248 | 21 |
| Barrow | 2023–24 | League Two | 30 | 0 | 1 | 0 | 1 | 0 | 2 | 0 | 34 | 0 |
| Barrow | 2024–25 | League Two | 5 | 0 | 0 | 0 | 3 | 0 | 1 | 0 | 9 | 0 |
| Barrow | 2025–26 | League Two | 5 | 0 | 0 | 0 | 1 | 0 | 3 | 1 | 9 | 1 |
| Barrow | Total | | 40 | 0 | 1 | 0 | 5 | 0 | 6 | 1 | 52 | 1 |
| Curzon Ashton (loan) | 2024–25 | National League North | 5 | 1 | 1 | 0 | — | | 1 (Note: Appearance(s) in the FA Trophy.) | 0 | 7 | 1 |
| Kidderminster Harriers (loan) | 2024–25 | National League North | 13 | 1 | — | | — | | 1 | 0 | 14 | 1 |
| Trafford | 2026–27 | North West Counties League; Premier Division | 0 | 0 | 0 | 0 | — | | 0 | 0 | 0 | 0 |
| Career total | | | 577 | 44 | 23 | 1 | 21 | 0 | 44 | 4 | 665 | 49 |

== Honours ==
Bury

- Football League Two second-place promotion: 2010–11

Southend United

- Football League Two play-offs: 2015

Millwall

- EFL League One play-offs: 2017

Port Vale

- EFL League Two play-offs: 2022

Individual

- Bury Player of the Season: 2011–12
- Football League Two Player of the Month: November 2014
- Port Vale Player of the Year: 2019–20
- EFL League Two Team of the Season: 2020–21
