= Jack Payne (footballer, born 1994) =

English footballer (born 1994)

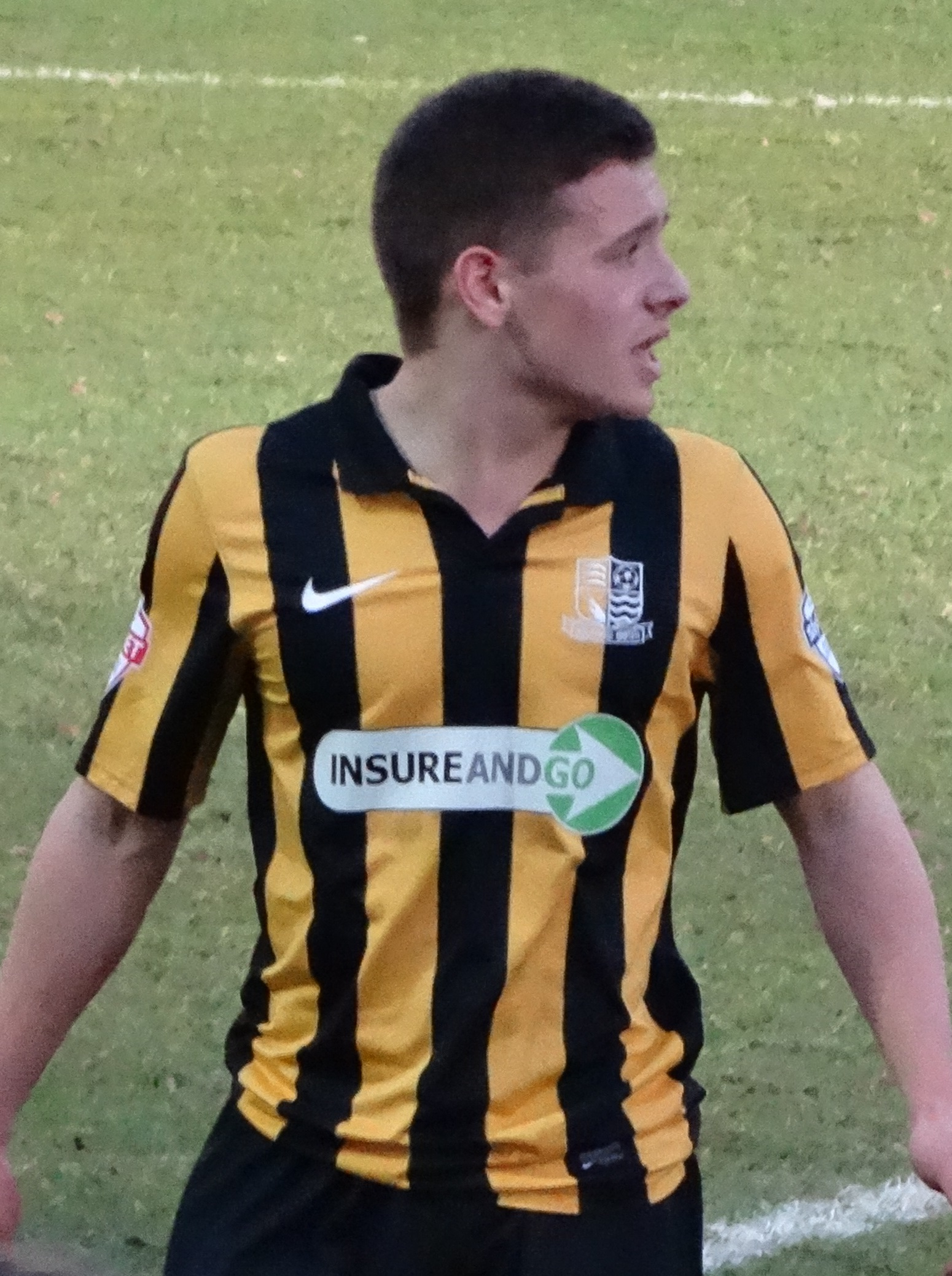
- Payne playing for Southend United in 2014.

Personal information
- Full name: Jack Payne
- Date of birth: 25 October 1994 (age 32)
- Place of birth: Tower Hamlets, London, England
- Height: 5 ft 5 in (1.65 m)
- Position: Attacking midfielder

Team information
- Current team: Colchester United
- Number: 10

Youth career
- Buckhurst Hill
- 2009–2013: Southend United

Senior career*
Years	Team	Apps	(Gls)
2013–2016	Southend United	77	(15)
2016–2019	Huddersfield Town	23	(2)
2017–2018	→ Oxford United (loan)	28	(3)
2018	→ Blackburn Rovers (loan)	18	(1)
2018–2019	→ Bradford City (loan)	39	(9)
2019–2020	Lincoln City	23	(2)
2020–2022	Swindon Town	78	(17)
2022–2024	Charlton Athletic	42	(4)
2023–2024	→ Milton Keynes Dons (loan)	40	(6)
2024–	Colchester United	81	(21)
- * Club domestic league appearances and goals as of 17:10, 6 May 2026 (UTC)

Jack Payne (born 25 October 1994) is an English professional footballer who plays as a midfielder for EFL League Two club Colchester United.

He made his professional debut for Southend United in August 2013. After three seasons at Southend he joined Huddersfield Town in June 2016. Payne had loan spells at Oxford United, Blackburn Rovers and Bradford City, before signing for Lincoln City in July 2019. He joined Swindon Town in August 2020, spending two seasons at the Wiltshire club before signing for Charlton Athletic in July 2022 and joining Milton Keynes Dons on loan in August 2023.

== Club career ==
=== Southend United ===
Payne began his career with Southend United and made his professional debut in a 1–0 defeat against Yeovil Town on 6 August 2013 in the League Cup. On 6 September 2014, Payne scored his first goal for Southend United in a 1–1 draw against Oxford United, opening the scoring in the 36th minute before Danny Hylton's equaliser in the second half. On 6 February 2016 Payne recorded three assists in the Essex derby as Southend beat Colchester 3–0.

After an impressive season in which he netted 9 goals in 32 appearances, Payne was voted Southend United's Player of the Year for the 2015–16 campaign.

=== Huddersfield Town ===
On 20 June 2016, Payne joined Championship side Huddersfield Town on a three-year deal. He made his debut for the Terriers in their 2–1 win over Brentford on 6 August 2016. His first goal for the Terriers was the winning goal in the 2–1 win against Newcastle United at St James' Park on 13 August 2016.

==== Oxford United (loan) ====
On 28 July 2017, Payne joined League One side Oxford United on a season-long loan. He made his debut against Oldham Athletic in the opening match of the 2017–18 season, which ended in a 2–0 away victory for Oxford, both goals coming from his assists. He scored his first goal for Oxford in an EFL Trophy tie against Stevenage on 29 August 2017. He was recalled by Huddersfield in January 2018, having scored seven goals in 34 appearances in all competitions.

==== Blackburn Rovers (loan) ====
On 16 January 2018, Payne was loaned to Blackburn Rovers for the rest of the season.

==== Bradford City (loan) ====
On 16 July 2018, Payne was loaned to Bradford City on a season-long loan. He scored on his debut against Shrewsbury Town on the opening day of the 2018–19 season. In December 2018 he was praised by City teammate Hope Akpan. In January 2019 it was announced that his loan would continue until the end of the 2018–19 season, after Bradford reached a new deal with parent club Huddersfield.

=== Lincoln City ===
On 3 July 2019, Payne signed for Lincoln City.

=== Swindon Town ===
On 6 August 2020, Payne joined Swindon Town. He spent two seasons at the club.

=== Charlton Athletic ===
On 18 July 2022, Payne joined Charlton Athletic.

On 3 May 2024, it was confirmed that Payne would leave Charlton Athletic when his contract expired.

==== Milton Keynes Dons (loan) ====
On 30 August 2023, Payne joined Milton Keynes Dons on a season-long loan. He scored his first league goal for the club on 24 October 2023, a free-kick from 25 yards, in a 4–1 home win over Bradford City.

=== Colchester United ===
On 2 July 2024, Payne signed a two-year contract with Colchester United. He was named Player of the Year in his first season with the club.

On 4 October 2025, Payne scored a first career hat-trick in a 6–2 victory over Chesterfield, all three goals being scored in the first-half. He was named EFL League Two Player of the Month for February 2026 having scored a second hat-trick of the season in a 4–1 win over Barnet. On 16 May 2026 the club announced it had extended the player's contract.

== Career statistics ==
As of match played 2 May 2026

Appearances and goals by club, season and competition
Club	Season	League			FA Cup		League Cup		Other		Total	
Club	Season	Division	Apps	Goals	Apps	Goals	Apps	Goals	Apps	Goals	Apps	Goals
Southend United	2013–14	League Two	11	0	1	0	1	0	2 (Note: One appearance in Football League Trophy, one in League Two play-offs)	0	15	0
Southend United	2014–15	League Two	34	6	1	0	1	0	2 (Note: One appearance and two goals in Football League Trophy, one appearance in League Two play-offs)	2	38	8
Southend United	2015–16	League One	32	9	0	0	0	0	3 (Note: Appearances in Football League Trophy)	0	35	9
Southend United	Total		77	15	2	0	2	0	7	2	88	17
Huddersfield Town	2016–17	Championship	23	2	3	2	1	0	1 (Note: Appearance in Championship play-offs)	0	28	4
Huddersfield Town	2017–18	Premier League	0	0	0	0	0	0	0	0	0	0
Huddersfield Town	2018–19	Premier League	0	0	0	0	0	0	0	0	0	0
Huddersfield Town	Total		23	2	3	2	1	0	1	0	28	4
Oxford United (loan)	2017–18	League One	28	3	1	0	1	0	4 (Note: Appearance(s) in EFL Trophy)	4	34	7
Blackburn Rovers (loan)	2017–18	League One	18	1	0	0	0	0	0	0	18	1
Bradford City (loan)	2018–19	League One	39	9	4	0	1	0	3	0	47	9
Lincoln City	2019–20	League One	23	2	2	0	2	0	3	0	30	2
Swindon Town	2020–21	League One	43	4	1	0	1	0	2	0	47	4
Swindon Town	2021–22	League Two	35	13	2	0	1	0	3 (Note: Two appearances in League Two play-offs and one appearance in EFL Trophy)	0	41	13
Swindon Town	Total		78	17	3	0	2	0	5	0	88	17
Charlton Athletic	2022–23	League One	39	4	2	2	5	0	4	1	50	7
Charlton Athletic	2023–24	League One	3	0	0	0	1	0	0	0	4	0
Charlton Athletic	Total		42	4	2	2	6	0	4	1	54	7
Milton Keynes Dons (loan)	2023–24	League Two	40	6	1	0	0	0	3 (Note: Two appearances in League Two play-offs and one appearance in EFL Trophy)	1	44	7
Colchester United	2024–25	League Two	42	8	1	0	2	1	5	0	50	9
Colchester United	2025–26	League Two	39	13	0	0	1	0	2	0	42	13
Colchester United	2026–27	League Two	0	0	0	0	0	0	0	0	0	0
Colchester United	Total		81	21	1	0	3	1	7	0	92	22
Career total			449	79	19	4	18	0	37	8	523	91

== Honours ==
Southend United

- Football League Two play-offs: 2015

Blackburn Rovers

- EFL League One second-place promotion: 2017–18

Individual

- Colchester United Player of the Year: 2024–25
- EFL League Two Team of the Season: 2024–25
- PFA Team of the Year: 2024–25 League Two
- EFL League Two Player of the Month: February 2026
