= Adam Thompson (footballer) =

English football player (born 1992)

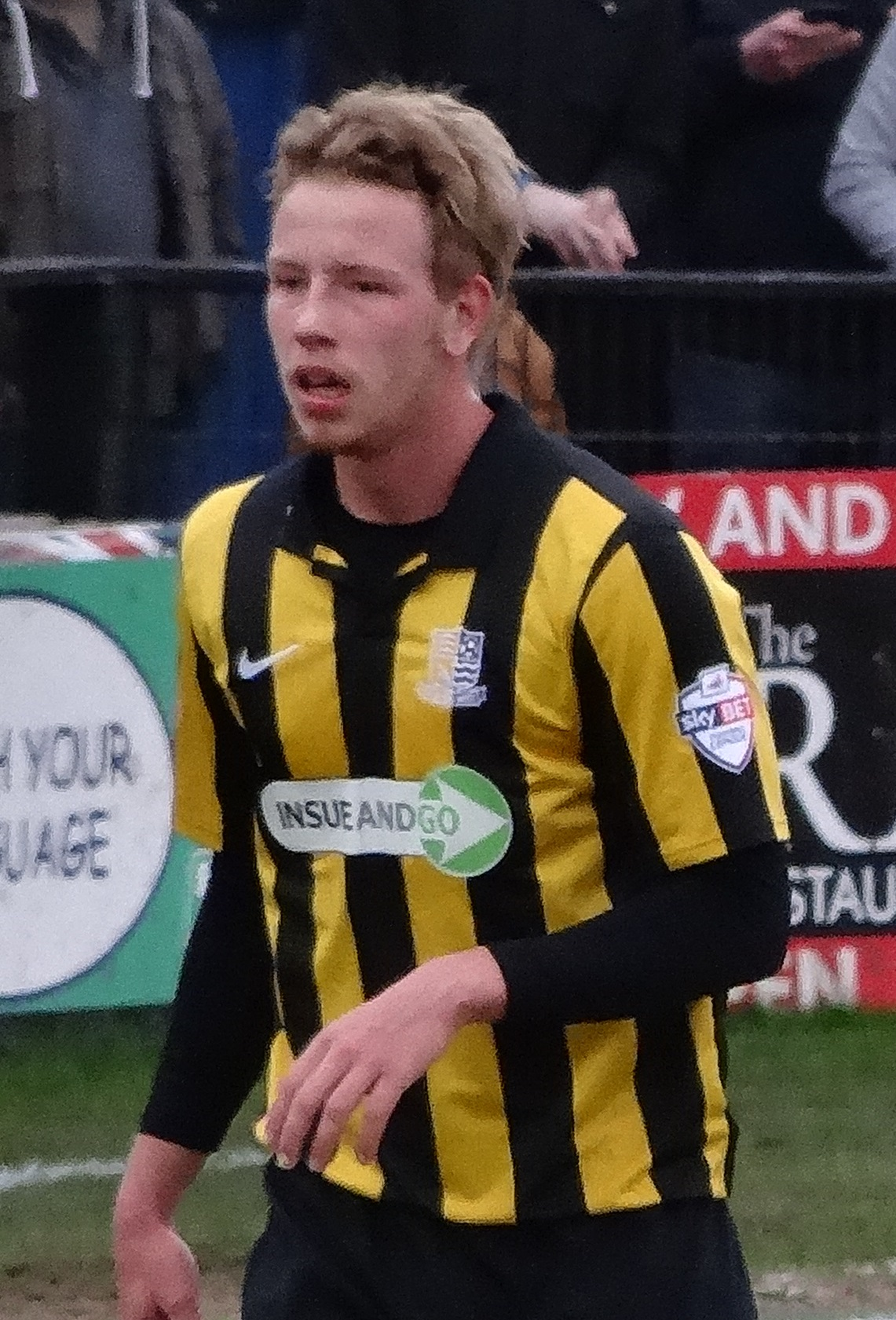
- Thompson playing for Southend United in 2014

Personal information
- Full name: Adam Lee Thompson
- Date of birth: 28 September 1992 (age 34)
- Place of birth: Harlow, England
- Height: 6 ft 1 in (1.85 m)
- Position: Defender

Youth career
- 2003–2010: Watford

Senior career*
Years	Team	Apps	(Gls)
2010–2014	Watford	14	(1)
2011	→ Brentford (loan)	8	(0)
2012	→ Brentford (loan)	12	(0)
2012	→ Wycombe Wanderers (loan)	2	(0)
2013	→ Barnet (loan)	1	(0)
2013–2014	→ Southend United (loan)	9	(0)
2014–2017	Southend United	100	(3)
2017–2019	Bury	59	(1)
2017	→ Bradford City (loan)	9	(0)
2019–2021	Rotherham United	10	(0)
2021–2024	Leyton Orient	34	(0)
2024	→ Barnet (loan)	11	(1)
2024–	Enfield Town	53	(3)

International career
2008	Northern Ireland U17	2	(0)
2010	Northern Ireland U19	8	(1)
2010–2013	Northern Ireland U21	11	(1)
2011	Northern Ireland	2	(0)
- * Club domestic league appearances and goals as of 09:56, 5 May 2026 (UTC)

Adam Lee Thompson (born 28 September 1992) is a professional footballer who plays for Enfield Town as a defender. A graduate of Watford's youth academy, he made his professional debut for Watford in 2010, and his senior international debut for Northern Ireland the following year.

== Club career ==
=== Watford ===
A member of the Watford academy since he was eleven, he was handed the number 29 jersey for the 2010–11 season.

He made his professional debut for the club on 24 August 2010, in their 2–1 League Cup Second Round exit to Notts County at Vicarage Road. Thompson made his league debut against Burnley at home on 12 February, a game Watford lost 3–1. Thompson later signed his first professional contract at Watford, which keeps him until 2013. Thompson scored his first professional goal for Watford three days later. In June 2011, Thompson signed a new contract with Watford, keeping him until 2014.

Upon his return from his loan spell at Barnet, Thompson then made his first league appearance under Gianfranco Zola having come on as a substitute for Daniel Pudil against Birmingham City on 16 February 2013.

=== Loan spells ===
On 25 August 2011, Thompson joined Brentford on a month's loan, scoring on his Bees debut in a Football League Trophy tie away to MK Dons. His goal made the match 1–1 at the time, it finished 3–3 with Brentford winning 4–3 on penalties. His loan was later extended for another month. Thompson returned to Watford on 26 October. Thompson re-joined Brentford on a one-month youth loan in early February which was extended until the end of the season on 10 April. Throughout the season, Thompson played a total of 22 games for Brentford in all competitions, but did not make an appearance for Watford.

During the first month of the 2012–13 season, Thompson played the entire game in Watford's League Cup tie against Bradford City, and subsequently joined Wycombe Wanderers on a month-long youth loan. Two days after joining the club, Thompson made his Wycombe Wanderers debut, playing 90 minutes, in a 1–0 loss against Southend United. However, after just two appearances, Thompson returned to his parent club.

On 4 January 2013, Thompson joined Barnet on loan for a month. He made his debut as an 82nd-minute substitute for Ricky Holmes in a 2–0 home win over Bradford City. On 14 January, Thompson returned to Watford early after suffering a dislocated and fractured shoulder in training.

=== Southend United ===
On 9 August 2013, Thompson announced via Twitter that he had joined League Two outfit Southend United on loan. Thompson made his Southend United debut, coming on as a substitute for Marc Laird seven minutes from full-time, in a 1–0 loss against Hartlepool United. Thompson made nine appearances in the first half of the season, due to his international commitment.

In January 2014, Thompson made the move to Southend United a permanent one for undisclosed fee, signing an 18-month contract. Just after finishing his loan spell, Thompson attracted interests from two clubs before Southend United won the race to sign Thompson. Thompson's first game after signing for the club on a permanent basis came on 18 January 2014, where he set up a goal for Barry Corr, in a 3–0 win over Chesterfield. Thompson ended his season, making sixteen appearances (as well combining his loan spell at Southend United) after he injured his calf, although he never played throughout the 2013–14 season despite being fit and being once on the bench.

The next season, Thompson missed the first four matches, due being on the bench and made his first appearance, coming on as a substitute in the first half, in a 2–0 loss against Plymouth Argyle on 30 August 2014. Since recovering from a calf injury, Thompson have established himself in the 2014–15 season despite missing out for four matches in late-December. Thompson was once again on the sidelines during a match against Mansfield Town on 3 April 2015 when he was injured in the first half and had to be substituted by Cian Bolger. After having surgery, it was announced that Thompson would be out for the remainder of the season and ended his season, making twenty-nine appearances in all competitions. Despite being absent, the club went on achieve promotion to Football League One after beating Wycombe Wanderers in the play-off final.

=== Bury ===
Thompson signed for Bury on 1 June 2017. He had a short loan spell at Bradford City and made nine appearances for the Bantams in 2017–18. Under the management of Ryan Lowe, Thompson in 2018–19 became a Bury first team regular, wearing the number five shirt, and captained the team on occasion as they achieved automatic promotion to League One. He left the club after the end of the season shortly before they were expelled from the EFL.

=== Rotherham United ===
On 27 August 2019, Thompson signed for Rotherham United on a two-year contract. He made 14 appearances in his first season as the Millers were promoted to the Championship, but did not make any further appearances after promotion. On 30 January 2021, Thompson left the club after his contract was mutually terminated.

=== Leyton Orient ===
On 30 January 2021, Thompson joined League Two side Leyton Orient on a contract until June 2022, which was later extended.

==== Barnet (loan) ====
On 31 January 2024, he re-joined Barnet on loan until the end of the season.

=== Enfield Town ===
On 26 October 2024, Thompson joined National League South side Enfield Town.

== International career ==
In September 2008 he was called up to the Northern Ireland under-17 squad.

He was a part of the under-19s run to the Milk Cup final in 2010. On 27 July he scored a vital equalizer against Mexico at the Coleraine Showgrounds, which helped take the team above Mexico on goal difference in the final table.

In August 2010, he received his first call-up the under-21 squad, and he played for the Northern Ireland national under-21 football team in a 2011 UEFA European Under-21 Football Championship qualification match against Germany on 7 September 2010. He was called up to the senior Northern Ireland team for the first time in February 2011. He made his debut on 9 February 2011, as a 66th-minute substitute in Northern Ireland's 3–0 defeat to Scotland in the 2011 Nations Cup. Scotland did not score while Thompson was on the field.

Thompson was selected in the squad for Northern Ireland's fixtures against New Zealand and Azerbaijan in June 2017.

== Career statistics ==
As of 6 April 2024

Appearances and goals by club, season and competition
Club	Season	League			FA Cup		League Cup		Other		Total	
Club	Season	Division	Apps	Goals	Apps	Goals	Apps	Goals	Apps	Goals	Apps	Goals
Watford	2010–11	Championship	10	1	0	0	1	0	0	0	11	1
Watford	2012–13	Championship	4	0	0	0	1	0	0	0	5	0
Watford	Total		14	1	0	0	2	0	0	0	16	1
Brentford (loan)	2011–12	League One	20	0	0	0	0	0	2 (Note: Appearances in EFL Trophy.)	1	22	1
Wycombe Wanderers (loan)	2012–13	League Two	2	0	0	0	0	0	0	0	2	0
Barnet (loan)	2012–13	League Two	1	0	0	0	0	0	0	0	1	0
Southend United (loan)	2013–14	League Two	16	0	3	0	0	0	0	0	19	0
Southend United	2014–15	League Two	28	0	0	0	1	0	0	0	29	0
Southend United	2015–16	League One	25	2	0	0	0	0	2	0	27	2
Southend United	2016–17	League One	40	1	1	0	0	0	4	0	45	1
Southend United	Total		109	3	4	0	1	0	6	0	120	3
Bury	2017–18	League One	15	0	0	0	1	0	0	0	16	0
Bury	2018–19	League Two	44	1	2	0	1	0	7	1	54	2
Bury	Total		59	1	2	0	2	0	7	1	70	2
Bradford City (loan)	2017–18	League One	9	0	1	0	0	0	3	1	13	1
Rotherham United	2019–20	League One	10	0	3	0	0	0	1	0	14	0
Rotherham United	2020–21	Championship	0	0	0	0	0	0	—		0	0
Rotherham United	Total		10	0	3	0	0	0	1	0	14	0
Leyton Orient	2020–21	League Two	6	0	0	0	0	0	0	0	6	0
Leyton Orient	2021–22	League Two	14	0	1	0	0	0	2	0	17	0
Leyton Orient	2022–23	League Two	14	0	0	0	1	0	2	0	17	0
Leyton Orient	2023–24	League One	0	0	0	0	0	0	0	0	0	0
Leyton Orient	Total		34	0	1	0	1	0	4	0	40	0
Barnet (loan)	2023–24	National League	11	1	0	0	0	0	1 (Note: Appearances in FA Trophy.)	0	12	1
Career total			265	6	12	0	5	0	26	3	305	9

== Honours ==
Bury

- EFL League Two runner-up: 2018–19

Rotherham United

- EFL League One runner-up: 2019–20

Leyton Orient

- EFL League Two: 2022–23
