= Mads Ibenfeldt =

Danish footballer (born 1985)

Personal information
- Full name: Mads Max Ibenfeldt
- Date of birth: 26 January 1985 (age 41)
- Place of birth: Denmark
- Height: 1.96 m (6 ft 5 in)
- Position: Defender

Youth career
- Skjold Birkerød
- Lyngby BK
- Randers FC
- AGF
- Silkeborg IF

Senior career*
Years	Team	Apps	(Gls)
2006–2007	Silkeborg IF		
2007–2008	LFA		
2008–2010	B93	39	(3)
2010–2013	Brønshøj BK	79	(4)
2013–2014	AB	14	(0)
2014–2015	Southend United	1	(0)
2016–2017	Nykøbing FC	30	(0)
- * Club domestic league appearances and goals as of 21 May 2017

Mads Max Ibenfeldt (born 26 January 1985) is a Danish former professional footballer who played as a defender.

His professional career lasted 11 years from 2006 to 2017, where he played for such teams as B39, AB, and Southend United. Famously, Ibenfeldt was on trial at the then Scottish Championship club St. Mirren, where he impressed, although nothing materialised.
