= Jason Williams (footballer, born 1995) =

English footballer

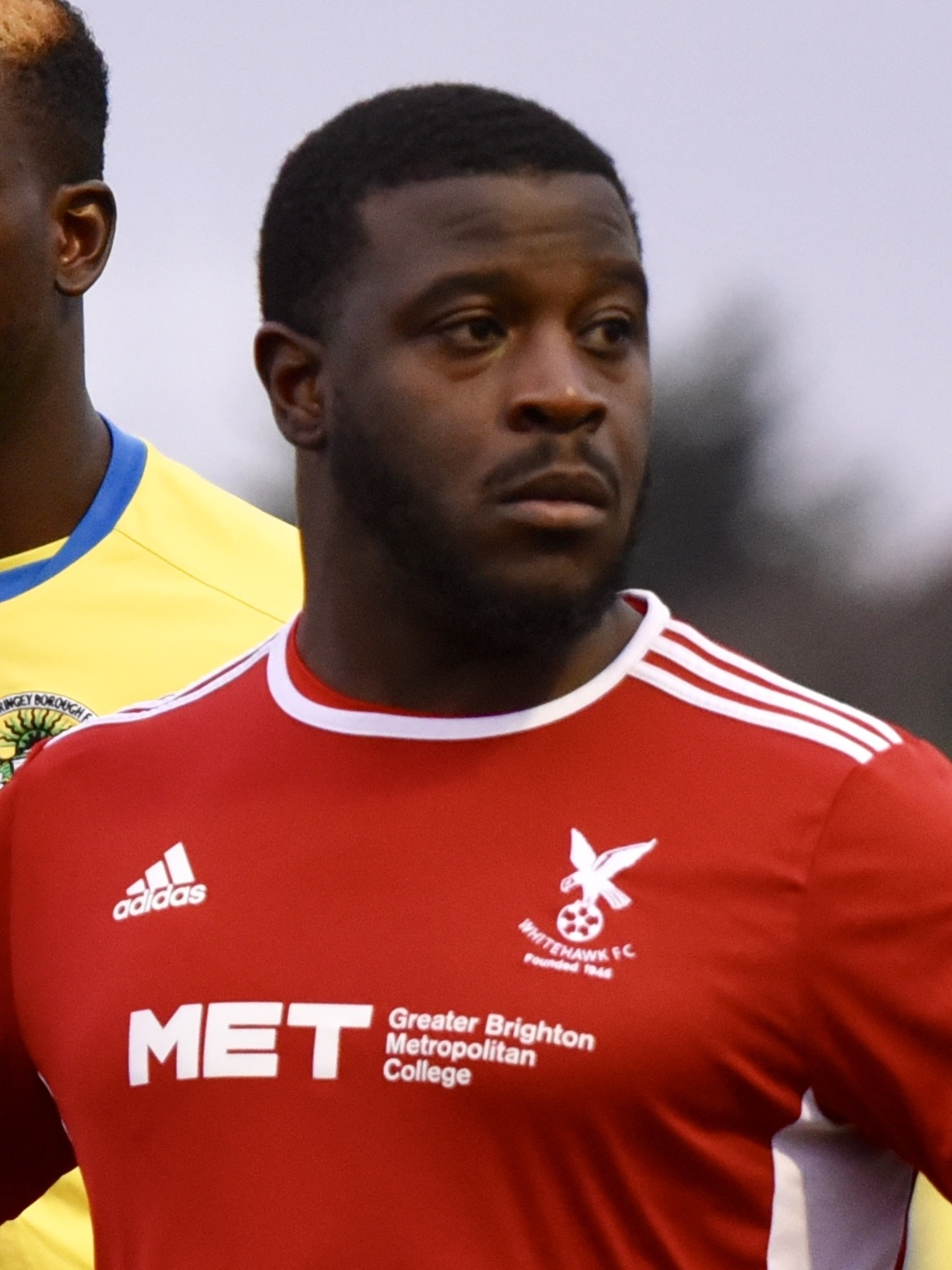
- Jason Williams playing for Whitehawk in January 2019

Personal information
- Full name: Jason Norrel Williams
- Date of birth: 28 September 1995 (age 31)
- Place of birth: Islington, England
- Height: 1.78 m (5 ft 10 in)
- Position: Forward

Youth career
- 2011–2014: Southend United

Senior career*
Years	Team	Apps	(Gls)
2014–2017	Southend United	13	(0)
2014	→ Chelmsford City (loan)	7	(5)
2015	→ Welling United (loan)	7	(2)
2016	→ Chelmsford City (loan)	13	(7)
2017	→ Boreham Wood (loan)	8	(0)
2017	Concord Rangers	0	(0)
2017–2018	Bishop's Stortford	23	(13)
2018	Kingstonian	9	(2)
2018–2019	Whitehawk	23	(5)
2019	Hemel Hempstead Town	8	(1)
2019	Brentwood Town	17	(12)
2019–2020	Tonbridge Angels	20	(4)
2021–2022	VCD Athletic	25	(5)
Total		173	(56)
- * Club domestic league appearances and goals as of 12:00, 15 August 2026 (UTC)

Jason Norrel Williams (born 28 September 1995) is a former English footballer.

== Career ==
Williams began his career with Southend United and made his professional debut coming on for Michael Timlin on 15 February 2014 in a 3–2 defeat against Exeter City. In October 2014 Williams joined Chelmsford City initially on a one-month loan deal, which was later extended, where he was in impressive form, scoring five goals in seven league games. Williams returned on loan to Chelmsford City in January 2016 as one of interim manager Kevin Maher's first two signings, the other being fellow Southend United teammate Jack Bridge.

After being released by Southend, Williams joined Concord Rangers in June 2017 but left the Beachboys before the start of the season to sign for Bishop's Stortford, where he scored on his debut in a defeat at Tiverton Town. He moved to Kingstonian in February 2018, also scoring on his full debut against Folkestone Invicta.

Williams signed for Whitehawk in July 2018. He joined Hemel Hempstead Town in March 2019. Following his time at Hemel Hempstead, Williams played for Brentwood Town during the first half of the 2019–20 in 2019–20 season, before moving to Tonbridge Angels. Ahead of the 2021–22 season, Williams signed for VCD Athletic.
