= Essex Women's Commemoration Project =

Blue plaques commemorating notable Essex women

The Essex Women's Commemoration Project (EWCP) is an English scheme to erect memorial plaques to honour notable women residents of places in the county of Essex. These plaques have recognised the achievements of 40 Essex women ranging in date from Mary Honywood (1527–1620) to Jane Packer (1959–2011).

== History ==
The project was set up by the Lord-Lieutenant of Essex, Jennifer Tolhurst, in 2020, following an approach from Essex theatre director Graham Watts who wanted to mark the quatercentenary of the birth of playwright and philosopher Margaret Cavendish, born in Colchester in 1623. Graham Watts joined Julia Abel Smith, James Bettley, Roy Clare and Juliet Townsend to form the EWCP team with the aim of identifying distinguished Essex women who had not received the public recognition it was felt they deserved.

The team used inclusion in the online Oxford Dictionary of National Biography as the principal criterion for the erection of a blue plaque on a building or nearby location associated with the subject. A shortlist of 72 women was drawn up and interested organisations, such as local councils and societies, were approached and asked whether they would like to take up the idea of erecting a plaque in their community. Organisations who worked with EWCP include Basildon Heritage, Chelmsford City Council, Colchester Civic Society, Essex Gardens Trust, the Federation of Essex Women's Institutes, the Maldon Society, the Newport Local History Group, and the Essex and South Suffolk Community Rail Partnership.

The first plaque, to Margaret Cavendish, was unveiled by Mrs Tolhurst on 22 September 2021.

The End of Project Report was published in June 2026, with a foreword by Dr Sarah Perry and endorsements by Clare Mulley, Holly Kyte, Kate Pankhurst and Kaye Jones. It includes a full listing with photographs of each plaque and What3Words locations, as well as the EWCP's Guide to Erecting Blue Plaques and related articles originally published in Essex Life.

=== Plaques ===
By December 2025, 38 plaques to 40 Women (and two men) had been installed with the support of the EWCP:

- Rose Allin, one of the Colchester Martyrs (Great Bentley)
- Ada Andrews, nurse (Canvey Island)
- Catherine Booth, co-founder of the Salvation Army (Clacton-on-Sea)
- Amy Bull, suffragette (Little Baddow)
- Margaret Cavendish, playwright, poet, novelist, scientist, philosopher (Colchester)
- Beth Chatto, gardener (Beth Chatto Gardens, Elmstead Market)
- Joanna Constantinidis, sculptor (Chelmsford)
- Katherine 'Mina' Courtauld, suffragist, co-founder Women's Land Army (Colne Engaine)
- Agnes Dawson, politician and trade unionist (Newport)
- Princess Dinubolu, beauty queen (Southend-on-Sea)
- Joyce Frankland, philanthropist (Newport)
- Mary Gee, philanthropist (Earls Colne)
- Gwynneth Holt and Thomas Huxley-Jones, sculptors (Chelmsford)
- Mary Honywood, supporter of Marian martyrs (Marks Hall)
- Clara James, trade unionist (Canvey Island)
- Elsie Lagsding, suffragette (Bowers Gifford, Basildon)
- Hannah Lake, founding mother of America (Wickford)
- Alice Lee, statistician and mathematician (Dedham)
- Kate and Louise Lilley, suffragettes (Clacton)
- Catherine Marsh, author and philanthropist (Colchester)
- Adele Meyer, social reformer and philanthropist (Newport)
- Jane Packer, florist (Chadwell St Mary)
- Edith Pechey, doctor (Langham)
- Vera Pemberton, founder and leader of Ingatestone Boys' Own Club (Ingatestone)
- Isabel Rawsthorne, artist, and Alan Rawsthorne, composer (Little Sampford)
- Helen Robinson, gardener (Hyde Hall, Rettendon)
- Dorothea and Madeleine Rock, suffragettes (Ingatestone)
- Joan Rosaire, circus artist (Billericay)
- Rosemary Rutherford, artist (Broomfield)
- Myra Sadd Brown, suffragette and pioneer of women's rights (Maldon)
- Nancy Tennant, choral conductor and adjudicator (Ugley)
- Pamela Underwood, gardener (Beth Chatto Gardens, Elmstead Market)
- Dorothy Wadham, founder of Wadham College, Oxford (Ingatestone)
- Philippa Walton, industrialist and entrepreneur (Royal Gunpowder Mills, Waltham Abbey)
- Marion Wilberforce, aviator (Wickford)
- Ellen Willmott, gardener (Great Warley)
- Hester Woodley, enslaved woman (Little Parndon)
- Hannah Woolley, author (Newport)
