= Southend United F.C. financial crisis =

Problems at the English football club

Southend United F.C. suffered periodic financial difficulties almost every ten years through the early 21st century - in 2000, 2010, and then a prolonged financial crisis from 2019 through to the summer of 2024. During this latter period, the club survived repeated HM Revenue and Customs winding-up petitions, while players and staff were also repeatedly paid late. Club owner, property developer Ron Martin had put the club up for sale in March 2023, but, through the summer of 2023, resisted completion of the sale in order to protect his interests in related property transactions. In August 2023, the latest HMRC winding-up hearing was adjourned for a third and final time, and Martin was warned that a sale of the club had to be agreed by 4 October 2023, while the club was deducted 10 points for its financial mismanagement and placed under a transfer embargo. On 3 October 2023, the sale of the club to the Justin Rees consortium was agreed, but formal completion was repeatedly delayed. Further creditors applied for winding-up petitions in early 2024, and the club was given six weeks to settle with creditors or face liquidation. The unresolved winding-up order resulted in another transfer embargo, while the Rees consortium continued to work with Southend Council to resolve issues relating to the property transactions. Days before the scheduled winding-up hearing in June 2024, debt payment plans were agreed and in early July 2024, the consortium agreed final terms with Martin, completing the takeover on 19 July 2024.

== Background ==
Martin Dawn PLC (run by property developer Ron Martin) and Delancey Estates, together forming South Eastern Leisure (SEL), took control of Southend United in November 1998, buying the club and its centrally located Roots Hall ground for £4 million from then chairman Vic Jobson, who at the time owned 55% of the issued share capital of the club. The transfer of Roots Hall's ownership to Roots Hall Limited - 50% owned by Martin Dawn - was to have ramifications for almost a quarter of a century. In July 2000, a debt to the Inland Revenue was paid off shortly before a scheduled winding-up petition hearing, and Ron Martin took over as chairman soon after. The club achieved promotion to League One in 2005 and in May 2006 became League One champions, but were relegated back to League One a year later after one season in the EFL Championship.

A further relegation, to League Two, followed in April 2010, by which time the club had also faced two winding-up orders from HM Revenue and Customs over unpaid tax bills. In February 2010 Southend players were not paid, the Professional Footballers Association (PFA) had to pay the players, and the club were placed under a transfer embargo until they paid the money back. In March 2010 Southend were given a 35-day extension to pay the unpaid bill or face administration, and further seven day extension in April 2010. On 20 April 2010 the bill was paid, and in August 2010 all actions against Southend United were dropped and an agreement was reached with HMRC.

== 2020–2024 financial difficulties ==
=== Double relegation ===
Further financial difficulties resulted in non-payment of players' and other employees' wages in December 2019, after which players consulted with the PFA. Club chairman Ron Martin paid £140,000 to pay wages, and a winding-up petition was dismissed after debts were cleared. However, financial constraints and an EFL transfer embargo prevented the club signing any new players. February 2020 wages were not paid on time, and Southend was charged with misconduct and later received a suspended three-point penalty and £7,500 fine. On 11 March, a further HMRC winding-up petition was adjourned - first to 29 April then three more times, eventually to 28 October 2020.

In April 2020, during the COVID-19 pandemic, Southend put "several staff and some players" on furlough under the UK Government's emergency job retention scheme - a move criticised by the PFA who said the club had "consistently" let players down over wages. On 9 June, EFL League One and Two clubs agreed to end the 2019–20 season; Southend were relegated to League Two. The following day, the club put the whole playing squad on furlough, but players refused to accept the move. At the start of the 2020–21 season, some players were sold to raise money leaving squad heavily reliant on youth players and free transfers. In October 2020, after the club settled tax debts of £493,931 with HMRC, a winding-up petition was dismissed by the High Court. However, a transfer embargo remained in place meaning that some signings were not allowed to play (Simeon Akinola waited from September to December before making his debut). The club won their first match of the season on 12 December against Scunthorpe which kicked off a run of form that briefly kindled some hope. However the form was fleeting and in May 2021, the club suffered a second successive relegation, dropping out of the Football League after 101 years.

In August 2021, Southend revealed their overall debt in July 2019 was £17.4M, having grown by £2.4M; Martin said the majority of the debt was owed to his companies, and that £6.8M of debt had already been written off. On 5 and 9 October 2021, Southend fans staged protests demanding the departure of chairman Ron Martin.

On 30 September 2022, the club was placed under a transfer embargo after a missed HMRC payment. In October 2022, HMRC issued a winding-up petition. A High Court hearing on 9 November was adjourned to 18 January 2023; the transfer embargo remained in place. After members of staff were late receiving their October 2022 salaries, the Shrimpers Trust and shirt sponsor PG Site Services each loaned the club £40,000. November and some December 2022 wages for players and non-playing staff were also paid late.

On 18 January 2023, the HMRC winding-up hearing was adjourned again, to 1 March 2023. Martin was seeking a £5M loan to pay debts including £1.4M in unpaid tax owed to HMRC. With players and other staff unpaid for January, anxious fans started planning a 'phoenix club' and there were unsuccessful attempts to engage with Martin over a possible sale of the club.

Players' January wages remained unpaid ahead of Southend's 25 February game at Torquay United, and were eventually paid 28 days late; other staff had not been paid since November. Less than 24 hours before the winding-up hearing, the club said it had paid the £1.4M tax bill, adding that "funds as working capital" had also been injected into the club. The winding-up petition was dismissed, but the transfer embargo remained in place. The club finished their second National League season in 8th position; non-playing staff at the club had not been paid for the past two months.

=== Club put up for sale ===
Meanwhile, on 17 March 2023, the club was put up for sale. Despite the February funds injection, its financial difficulties continued, and on 4 May 2023 the club was served another HMRC winding-up petition—their 18th—due to be heard in the High Court on 17 May. Three companies, including shirt sponsor PG Site Services and Engie Power, were also involved in the petition regarding a £275,000 debt, but the hearing was adjourned to 12 July 2023, giving Martin more time to sell the club.

In July 2023, after repeated late payment of club staff wages, players refused to resume pre-season training until they were paid. Backing the players' decision to suspend training, the Shrimpers Trust offered to support unpaid club staff. While players were eventually paid, manager Maher and other backroom staff remained unpaid three days before the winding-up hearing, while club sale discussions were reportedly being held up by the stadium side of the transaction.

On 12 July 2023, the winding-up hearing was adjourned for a second time, to 23 August 2023, to allow further time for a sale to be concluded, amid doubts about the club's ability to meet National League requirements. On 17 July 2023, Martin said he would sell his stake in the club for £1, but wanted £4.5M for Roots Hall. The club also needed £1M "in the short term" to settle its latest HMRC winding-up petition and lift a transfer embargo.

On 21 July 2023, the club paid £300,000 in football-related debts to remain in the National League. Club staff were paid wages dating back up to three months on 26 July. The National League licensed the club to participate in the 2023–24 season, but required it to pay its HMRC debt in full by 23 August 2023 and to ensure all future football creditors or HMRC debts were cleared on time during the 2023–24 season. A breach of these conditions would result in an immediate and automatic 10 points deduction.

Southend started the season with a matchday squad of just 15 players due to the club's transfer embargo. The future of the club's academy was also in doubt as it was no longer eligible for EFL funding. Eventually the academy was scaled down rather than shut down.

=== Points deduction ===
On 23 August 2023, the winding-up hearing was adjourned for a third and final time, to 4 October 2023, with Judge Sebastian Prentis telling Martin if he was in charge of any other business it would have been wound up. Martin told the court he was "confident" a sale to an Australian buyer—later named as Justin Rees—should be finalised by the end of September. The judge said the club would be wound up if the deadline was missed. As part of the HMRC debt remained outstanding, the club were deducted 10 points by the National League.

Due to injuries and suspensions, the club were left with just 10 available players ahead of a match against Maidenhead United on 19 September, with manager Kevin Maher appealing against the red cards and talking to the National League about bolstering his squad. The club signed former West Ham goalkeeper David Martin to make his immediate debut, with Portuguese midfielder Mauro Vilhete one of just two substitutes, as Southend won 2–0.

On 20 September 2023, the Justin Rees consortium said that two bids to Ron Martin had been rejected. Few details of the latest bid were released, but—due to "the non-viability of a new stadium at Fossetts Farm"—it involved retaining and upgrading Roots Hall as the club's stadium, taking ownership of the stadium and the club's training ground, and Martin contributing funds towards Roots Hall's redevelopment. Meanwhile, fans staged an anti-Martin protest march to Roots Hall ahead of the club's league tie against AFC Fylde on 23 September 2023.

=== Sale to Justin Rees consortium ===
On 3 October 2023, the sale of the club to the Justin Rees consortium was agreed, but formal completion was repeatedly delayed. The club was to remain at Roots Hall, with the 500 homes once planned for the site now transferred to Fossetts Farm. The deal was announced the day before the High Court hearing of HMRC's winding-up petition, amid reports that the HMRC debt had now been paid, and the winding-up petition was duly dismissed. On 5 December, the consortium said due diligence had raised issues which would take time to resolve. On 23 December 2023, Martin and the Rees consortium exchanged contracts for the sale of the club; the deal remained conditional upon Southend Council's approval of property transactions. On 8 March 2024, Southend CEO Tom Lawrence said final completion of the takeover was a couple of months away, being dependent upon a council review of the Fossets Farm plans. As a result, one impatient creditor, Stewarts Law, petitioned for the club to be wound up (the club's 19th such petition); the High Court hearing was subsequently adjourned. On 6 April, Ron Martin said he expected to have sold the club by mid-May 2024. This proved to be optimistic.

After 15 months, Southend's transfer embargo was lifted on 28 December 2023. Southend finished the 2023–24 National League season in 9th place. Without the 10-point deduction they would have finished sixth.

At the club's winding-up petition hearing on 15 May, the consortium and Martin sought a six-week adjournment, supported by Stewarts Law and two other creditors. The club was given six weeks to settle with creditors or face liquidation. As a consequence of the unresolved winding-up order, Southend was placed under a fresh transfer embargo on 17 May 2024.

On 7 June 2024, the consortium ("Custodians of Southend United", COSU) said the club could go out of business as a property element of the contract might not be signed before the 26 June winding-up hearing. Southend Council's new leader Daniel Cowan blamed the previous administration for assurances that "fell outside of normal practice and were simply not achievable". On 14 June 2024, Cowan confirmed the proposed Fossetts Farm development had failed the council's due diligence process. The developer (Citizen Housing) and the Martins were given until 21 June 2024 to respond to new council proposals, with future council involvement dependent on COSU acquiring the club. Adding to the pressure, on 24 June 2024, the National League ordered Southend United to provide a £1m bond due to ongoing financial uncertainty. The bond would remain in place until the COSU takeover was successfully concluded. COSU criticised the move, saying the National League was "only making the situation more difficult to resolve". Southend successfully appealed to an FA-appointed arbitration panel, and the bond requirement was later withdrawn.

The day before the winding-up hearing, Stewarts Law reached a settlement with Southend United. On 26 June 2024, a payment plan was agreed with a second creditor (PG Site Services, owed £350,000) and the winding-up petition was dismissed in the High Court. On 2 July 2024, COSU was reported to have agreed terms with Ron Martin. On 19 July 2024, the COSU consortium completed its takeover of Southend United. Justin Rees became the new chairman, with day-to-day affairs managed by CEO Tom Lawrence. Despite the takeover, the club still expected to report a £2 million loss as money was reinvested in the club's squad and facilities. On the pitch, Southend finished the 2024–25 National League season in the play-off places, eventually meeting Oldham Athletic in the final at Wembley Stadium and losing 3–2 after extra time.

In January 2026 £10m owed to the club by now former owner Ron Martin was written off when he was declared bankrupt. This meant that money COSU had designated for stadium redevelopment would no longer be available.
