= James Bettley =

British architectural historian

James Bettley JP DL FSA

High Sheriff of Essex
- In office 2019–2020
- Preceded by: Bryan Burrough
- Succeeded by: Julie Fosh

Personal details
- Education: Trinity College, Oxford
- Occupation: Architectural historian

James Bettley is a British architectural historian, whose publications include editions of the Pevsner Architectural Guides to Essex (2007), Suffolk (2015) and Hertfordshire (2019). In 2019-20 he served as High Sheriff of Essex. In July 2025 he was appointed Vice Lord-Lieutenant of Essex.

== Biography ==
James Bettley was born on 9 April 1958, son of Francis Ray Bettley and his wife Jean. He attended school at Winchester College, where he was a member of the boxing team. He read Medieval and Modern Languages (French and German) at Trinity College, Oxford, including a year at the University of Vienna (BA 1980, MA 1983). In 1999 he received a PhD from The Courtauld Institute of Art, University of London. He married Lucy Ferrar on 1 February 1986. They have three children.

From 1980 to 1988 he worked in the drawings collection and library of the Royal Institute of British Architects (RIBA) before being appointed Librarian, then Head of Education and Research, at the new Design Museum before its opening in 1989. In 1991 he returned to the RIBA as Assistant Director of the British Architectural LIbrary and then from 1997 to 2000 was Head of Collection Development at the National Art Library, Victoria and Albert Museum. Since 2014 he has been Librarian of Chevening, Kent. He was elected an Associate of the Library Association in 1993 and a Fellow of the Society of Antiquaries of London in 2002.

Bettley was appointed a Justice of the Peace in 1996 and a Deputy Lieutenant of Essex in 2013. In 2016 he was nominated as High Sheriff of Essex for the year 2019-2020.

He was chairman of the Friends of Essex Churches Trust from 2012 to 2017 and is now chairman of their Grants Committee. He is a member (and past chairman) of the Chelmsford Diocesan Advisory Committee for the Care of Churches and a member of Chelmsford Cathedral Fabric Advisory Committee. He has also sat on the Church Buildings Council and chaired their Sculpture & Furnishings Committee. He is chairman of the Rural Community Council of Essex and a trustee of the Essex Heritage Trust. He has contributed sections on architecture and the built environment to successive volumes of the Victoria County History of Essex. With Graham Watts, Julia Abel Smith, Roy Clare and Juliet Townsend, Bettley formed the Essex Women's Commemoration Project with the aim of identifying distinguished Essex women who had not received the public recognition it was felt they deserved.

== Selected publications ==
=== Books (including contributions) ===
- Sir Thomas Graham Jackson, Bt, RA, 1835–1924: an exhibition of his Oxford buildings (1983) (catalogue of exhibition in the Examination Schools, Oxford)
- Lush and luxurious: the life and work of Philip Tilden 1887–1956 (1987) (catalogue of exhibition at the Heinz Gallery, RIBA, London)
- Catalogue of the Drawings Collection of the Royal Institute of British Architects: a cumulative index (ed.) (1989) Aldershot: Gregg Publishing, ISBN 0-576-40004-1
- The Art of the Book: from medieval manuscript to graphic novel (ed.) (2001) London: V&A Publications, ISBN 1-85177-333-9
- 'Collection development' (2001) in Information sources in art, art history and design, edited by Simon Ford. Munich: K. G. Saur, ISBN 3-598-24438-X
- Recollections: the life and travels of a Victorian architect: Sir Thomas Graham Jackson Bt R.A. (introduction and gazetteer) (2003) London: Unicorn Press, ISBN 0-906290-72-4
- ‘Some architectural aspects of the role of manuals in changes to Anglican liturgical practice in the nineteenth century’ (2004) in The Church and the Book, edited by R. N. Swanson. Woodbridge: Boydell Press, ISBN 0-9529733-8-3
- Essex (Buildings of England) (2007) New Haven & London: Yale University Press, ISBN 978-0-300-11614-4
- Suffolk: East (Buildings of England) (2015) New Haven & London: Yale University Press, ISBN 978-0-300-19654-2
- Suffolk: West (Buildings of England) (2015) New Haven & London: Yale University Press, ISBN 978-0-300-19655-9
- ‘Laurence King and Faith Craft’ (2015) in All Manner of Workmanship: papers from a symposium on Faith Craft, edited by Robert Gage. Downton: Spire Books, ISBN 978-1-904965-50-3
- Hertfordshire (Buildings of England) (2019) New Haven & London: Yale University Press, ISBN 978-0-300-22390-3
- ‘Ernest Geldart (1848–1929) priest and architect’ (2020) in Twenty Priests for Twenty Years, edited by Michael Yelton. Anglo-Catholic History Society, ISBN 978-1-9163276-0-3
- ‘The Plume Building’ (2020) in Dr Thomas Plume, 1630–1704: his life and legacies in Essex, Kent and Cambridge, edited by R. A. Doe and C. C. Thornton. Hatfield: Essex Publications, ISBN 978-1-912260-16-4
- ‘“A building of altogether exceptional interest”: the rediscovery of St Peter’s Chapel in the nineteenth century, and its restoration in the twentieth’ (2023) in St Peter-on-the-Wall: heritage and landscape on the North Sea coast, edited by Johanna Dale. London: UCL Press ISBN 978-1-80008-437-7, free to download from https://www.uclpress.co.uk/products/211163
- English Churches in Europe: An Architectural and Social History (2026) London: John Hudson Publishing ISBN 978-1-7385400-3-7

=== Articles ===
- ‘Marshall Sisson 1897–1978’ (1982), RIBA Transactions 2: 93–100
- ‘T.G. Jackson and the Examination Schools’ (1983), Oxford Art Journal 6: 57-66
- ‘Post voluptatem misericordia: the rise and fall of the London lock hospitals’ (1984), London Magazine 10: 167-175
- ‘Established in pompous style: the heyday of the kennel’ (7 Feb 1985), Country Life 177: 308-11 (with Julia Wolton)
- ‘Godfrey Samuel 1904–1982’ (1985), RIBA Transactions 7: 82-91
- ‘In the swing of fashion: the architecture of Philip Tilden’ (1 Jan 1987), Country Life 181: 42-45
- ‘Hellen’s, Herefordshire’ (29 Sep 1988), Country Life 182: 174-177
- Suspense building nicely' (9 Nov 1989), Country Life 183: 76-78
- ‘New light on St Nicholas [Little Braxted]’ (15 Apr 1993), Country Life 187: 78-79
- 'A checklist of Essex architects 1834-1914' (1993), Essex Archaeology and History 24: 168-184
- ‘“Foremost in action for the liberties of the church”: the legacy of Canon T.W. Perry at Ardleigh’ (1999), Essex Journal 34: 50-54
- ‘“The Master of Little Braxted in his prime”: Ernest Geldart and Essex, 1873–1900’ (2000), Essex Archaeology and History 31: 169-194
- ‘Styling a floral religious order’ (7 Dec 2000), Country Life 194: 108-109
- ‘“Lapt in lead”: the remains of William Harvey at Hempstead church’ (2001), Essex Journal 36: 43-47
- ‘“An earnest desire to promote a right taste in ecclesiastical design”: Cox & Sons and the rise and fall of the church furnishing companies’ (2002), Decorative Arts Society Journal 26: 8-25
- ‘Travels with an architect’s pencil’ (13 Nov 2003), Country Life 197: 84
- ‘Attitudes to nineteenth-century architecture in Essex’ (2010), Essex Journal 45: 22-28
- ‘In the footsteps of William of Wykeham: Anglican priest-architects of the nineteenth century’ (2011), Transactions of the Ancient Monuments Society 55: 9-38
- ‘“All its glory is from within”: the importance of colour in church interiors, 1843-1903’ (2012), Ecclesiology Today 45: 15-34
- ‘A month in the country: Revd Ernest Geldart at Kelsale, 1881’ (2012), Proceedings of the Suffolk Institute of Archaeology and History 42: 490-503
- ‘Portrait of a family home: Boxted Hall, Suffolk’ (25 Apr 2012), Country Life 208: 84-88
- ‘The Wool Hall, Lavenham: an episode in the history of preservation’ (2013), Transactions of the Ancient Monuments Society 57: 26-55
- ‘The contemporary in the conquest: Spains Hall, Essex’ (30 Apr 2014), Country Life 208: 36-41
- 'All very convenient: Braxted Park, Essex' (5 Aug 2015), Country Life 209: 36-40
- ‘“The great progress of the place in modern times”: the Chelmsford Planning Survey and the High Chelmer Development, 1945–73’ (2016), Essex Journal 51: 72-84
- ‘“You have gone too far and an apology is needed”: the saga of enlarging St Martin’s, Chipping Ongar, 1880–84’ (2017), Essex Journal 52: 68-77
- ‘A country education: Royal Masonic School, Rickmansworth, Hertfordshire’ (28 Feb 2018), Country Life 212: 104-109
- ‘Reviving histories: The Lordship, Benington Lordship [sic], Hertfordshire’ (13 Feb 2019), Country Life 213: 50-55
- ‘“This unfortunate parsonage”: the convoluted tale of the construction and subsequent fate of the parsonage house at Tring’ (2020), Transactions of the Ancient Monuments Society 64: 72-89
- ‘Monuments from the Foundling Hospital, London, now at Ashlyns School, Berkhamsted (Hertfordshire)’ (2021), Church Monuments 36: 179-201
- ‘Honouring the past and observing the future: Henshaw Halsey’s chapel and monuments in the church of St John the Baptist, Great Gaddesden (Hertfordshire)’ (2022-2023), Church Monuments 37: 117-130 (with Andrew Skelton)
- ‘Designing Anglican churches in Europe: British architects, local architects, or both?’ (2025), Ecclesiology Today 64: 9-35
