= Beckham World of Sport =

Beckham World of Sport is a soccer academy (the David Beckham Academy), a sports center, and a football stadium for professional players and for children which is being built at the Cape São Roque in the city of Natal, capital of the state of Rio Grande do Norte in Brazil.

The complex is sponsored by the player David Beckham who visited Natal in January 2008 to launch the project.

A resort called "Cabo São Roque" is being built along with the World of Sport.
