= HMS Birmingham (D86) =

Destroyer of the Royal Navy

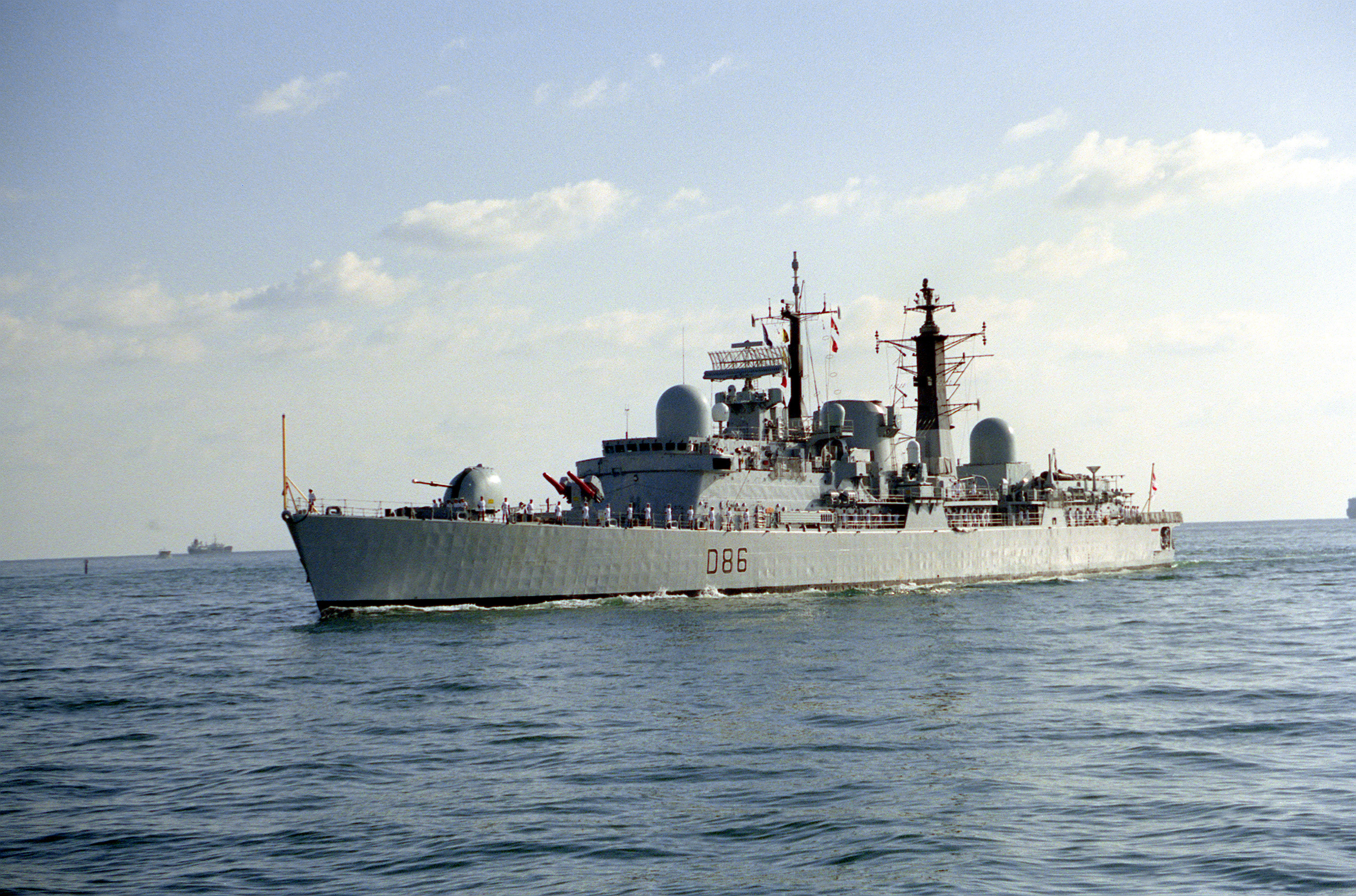
- HMS Birmingham

History

United Kingdom
- Name: HMS Birmingham
- Builder: Cammell Laird
- Laid down: 28 March 1972
- Launched: 30 July 1973
- Commissioned: 3 December 1976
- Decommissioned: 31 December 1999
- Identification: Pennant number: D86
- Nickname(s): "The Brum"
- Fate: Sold for scrap on 20 October 2000

General characteristics
- Class & type: Type 42 destroyer
- Displacement: 4,820 tonnes
- Length: 125 m (410 ft)
- Beam: 14.3 m (47 ft)
- Draught: 5.8 m (19 ft)
- Propulsion: 2 × shaft COGOG; 4 × Rolls-Royce producing 36 MW (48,000 hp); 2 × Olympus TM3B and; 2 × Tyne RM1C
- Speed: 30 knots (56 km/h)
- Complement: 287
- Armament: 2 × Sea Dart surface-to-air missile launcher; 1 × 4.5-inch (114 mm) Mk.8 gun
- Aircraft carried: Lynx HMA8

HMS Birmingham was a Type 42-class destroyer laid down by Cammell Laird and Company, Limited, at Birkenhead on 28 March 1972, launched on 30 July 1973 by Lady Empson, wife of Sir Derek Empson and commissioned on 3 December 1976. She was named for the city of Birmingham, England.

Birmingham was also one of the first ships together with Ardent that served in the Persian Gulf on the Armilla patrol that protected oil supplies during the Iran–Iraq War in 1980. She was also the first ship to replenish a Sea Dart missile at sea. Birmingham spent much of her service as Fleet Contingency Ship and spent considerable time in the post-Falklands conflict patrol role. In 1984 she patrolled the Falklands and acted as a radar picket ship along with the frigates Broadsword and Ajax. In 1985 she took part in Standing Naval Force Mediterranean, calling at Gibraltar, Palma de Mallorca, Naples, & Messina. After a refit at Rosyth dockyard, she returned to Portsmouth in 1988 for sea trials and re-acceptance to the fleet. Commanded by Roy Clare (later Director of the Maritime Museum in London [2006–7]), her first deployment post-refit was a tour to the Persian Gulf region, returning in March 1989.

In July 1990, whilst on deployment as part of the West Indies Guard Ship, Birmingham, supported by RFA Oakleaf was ordered to sail from Florida to Trinidad in response to the Jamaat al Muslimeen coup attempt, in which Islamist fundamentalists had taken hostages. However, as the Birmingham arrived the hostages were released.

Birmingham paid off at Portsmouth on 10 December 1999. In early January 2000 under her own power, she sailed to Devonport where, for the next two months, she was stripped of usable equipment. In May 2000 she was towed back to Portsmouth where she was sold for scrap, leaving under tow for Spain on 20 October 2000.
