= St. Michael's Churchyard, Mickleham =

Graveyard in Surrey, England

St. Michael's Church, Mickleham
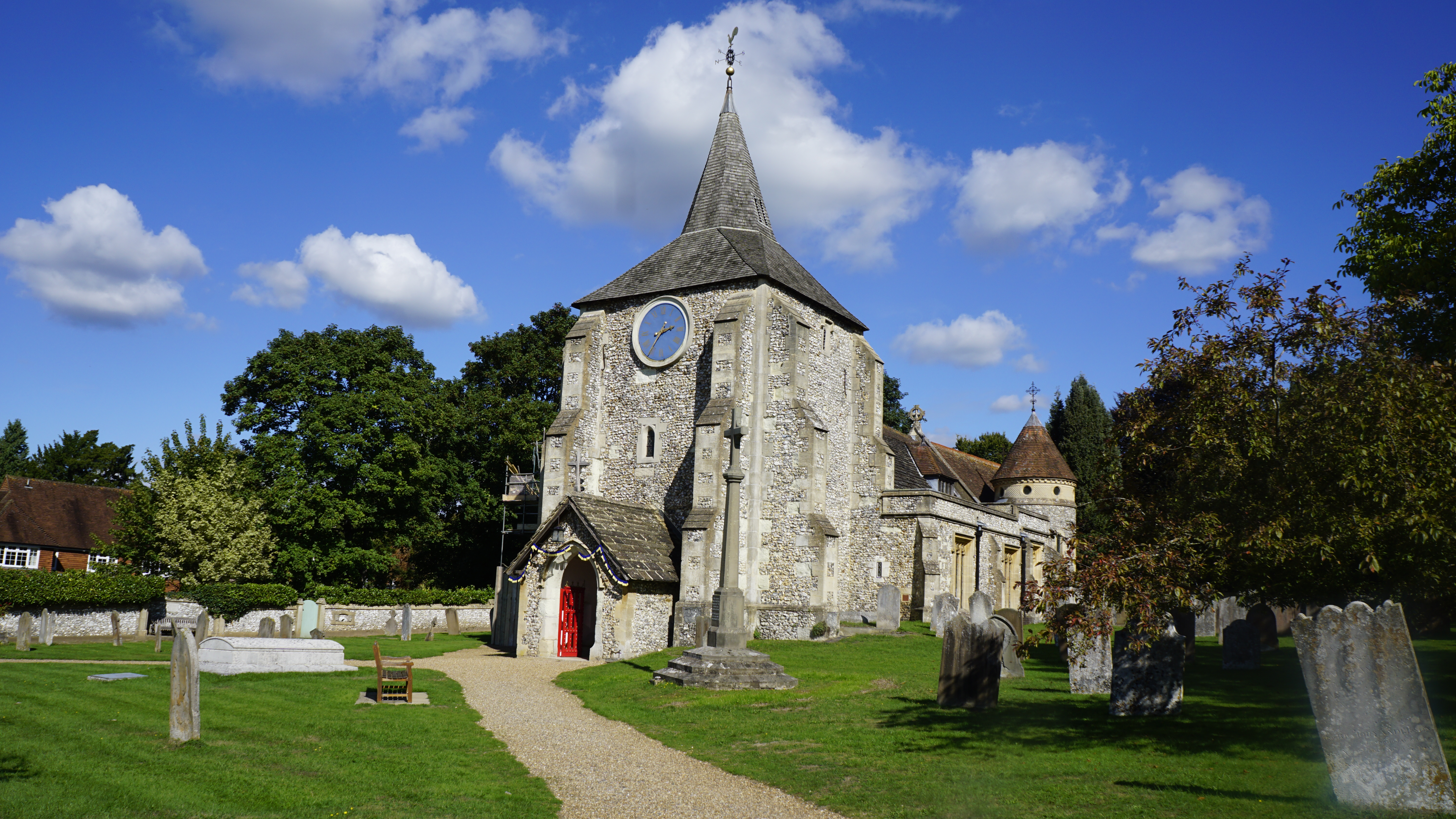
- St. Michael's Church, Mickleham
- 51°16′03″N 0°19′24″W
- Location: near Old London Road and Swanworth Lane, Mickleham, RH5-6
- Country: England
- Denomination: Church of England

History
- Consecrated: around 950 to 1180

Architecture
- Style: Norman
- Years built: 950–1180 (original structure)

Administration
- Province: Canterbury
- Diocese: Guildford

Listed Building – Grade II*
- Official name: Church of St Michael
- Designated: 28 November 1951
- Reference no.: 1028835

St. Michael's Churchyard is the church and graveyard located in Mickleham, Surrey, England, belonging to the Church of England parish of Mickleham.

== History ==
The church building dates back to the Anglo-Saxon and Norman period from 950 to 1180, but some changes to the building were made in 1823, 1842, 1872 and 1891.

== Notable burials ==
There are 867 recorded burials, but more are accounted for since 1891, not including those from 950 to 1891. The graveyard is the final resting place of

- Philippa Walton (1674/5–1749), businesswoman and gunpowder factory owner
- Thomas Grissell (1801–1874), public works contractor
- Anne Manning (1807–1879), novelist
- Maria Kinnaird (1810–1891), widow of Thomas Drummond.
- Trefor Jones (1908 - 1984), Headmaster of The Latymer School
- Trevor Lawrence (1831–1913), had famous orchid houses at Burford Lodge in the parish. He was the grandfather of Cyril Hare's wife.
- Richard Bedford Bennett (1870–1947), Prime Minister of Canada and a member of the House of Lords. Bennett's grave is located steps from the front of the church doors and has a marker from the Government of Canada signifying the important figure buried there.
- John Norton-Griffiths (1871–1930), "Empire Jack", the driving force behind the Tunnelling companies of the Royal Engineers in WW1, was buried here on 18 October 1930.
- James Jeans (1877–1946), physicist, astronomer, mathematician
- Graham Gilmour (1885–1912), pioneer aviator. Killed in a plane crash in Richmond Park.
- Cyril Hare (1900–1958), detective story writer, who was born in Mickleham Hall in 1900 and died at Westhumble in the parish in 1958.
- Janet Gladys Aitken (1908–1988), socialite
- John Junor (1919–1997), controversial editor of the Sunday Express and The Mail on Sunday.
