= Philippa Walton =

18th century businesswoman

- Born: Philippa Bourchier; 1674
- Died: 7 December 1749 (aged 74–75)
- Known for: Gunpowder Manufacturer
- Spouse: William Walton (?-1711, his death)
- Children: 10
- Father: John Bourchier

Philippa Walton (née Bourchier; 1674 – 7 December 1749) was a British businessperson. From 1711 onward, she managed one of the biggest gunpowder factories in England, and established herself as one of the major providers of gunpowder to the British Army.

== Biography ==
Philippa was born in 1674, the fourth of five daughters and the coheir of John Bourchier, a doctor from Ipswich. She married William Walton, a London merchant who in 1702 took over the powder mills at Waltham Abbey. Previously owned by the Hudson family, the mills had fallen into disgrace at the end of the 17th century after Peter Hudson was accused of supplying bad powder in 1693.

With a rising demand for gunpowder thanks to the outbreak of the War of the Spanish Succession (1701–1714) William was awarded his first contract in 1702, soon after acquiring the mills. Following his early death in 1711, Philippa, at that time 36 years old and with ten young children, took over the enterprise. She ran the mills independently until 1723, when she took one of her sons, John, into partnership with her.

Under Philippa's ownership the Waltham Abbey Mills became one of the most important gunpowder mills in the country, featuring several horse mills and stamp mills. It established itself as one of the major suppliers to the government, during a period of almost uninterrupted war between European powers.

Philippa died on 7 December 1749 at the age of 74 and was buried in St. Michael's Churchyard, Mickleham, where her son Philip was the vicar.

== Family ==
Philippa and William Walton had ten children, nine of whom survived to adulthood:

- William, the only one of Philippa's children to have children of his own; his son John eventually inherited the family business
- John (died 19 July 1757, aged 58), he married Hester Jacobsen, daughter of Sir Jacob Jacobsen, but she pre-deceased him and they had no children
- Thomas
- James
- Bourchier
- Philip, vicar at St. Michael's Church, Mickleham
- Philippa
- Ann
- Elizabeth

None of her daughters married and she left her shares in the gunpowder business to them, as her sons had already received "sufficient assistance to satisfy any claim on their father's estate." The sisters later sold their shares to their brother John.

== Legacy ==
In 1757 John Walton died, and the factory was inherited by his brothers Thomas and Bouchier. Meanwhile, in the wake of the outbreak of the Seven Years' War, the Waltham Abbey gunpowder factory was becoming an increasingly important asset for the British Army. The British government began nationalising gunpowder mills in 1759, when it purchased the Faversham Mills; in 1787 the Crown acquired the Waltham Abbey Mills from the Walton family, making them one of the three Royal Gunpowder Mills in the United Kingdom (the others being at Ballincollig and Faversham).

== Commemoration ==
A blue plaque was unveiled in Philippa Walton's honour in 2022 on Walton House at the Royal Gunpowder Mills, recommended by the Essex Women’s Commemoration Project.
