= Roots Hall =

Association football stadium in Southend

Coordinates: 51°32′57″N 0°42′6″E

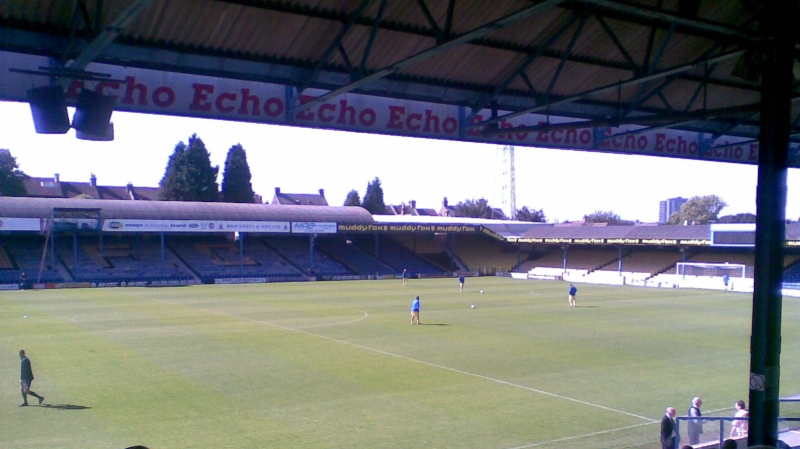
- Interactive map of Roots Hall
- Full name: Roots Hall Stadium
- Location: Southend-on-Sea
- Capacity: 10,500
- Field size: 110 × 74 yards

Construction
- Built: 1952
- Opened: 1955

Tenant
- Southend United F.C. (1955–present)

Roots Hall is a football stadium located in Southend-on-Sea, Essex, England. The stadium is the home ground of the National League team Southend United. With a capacity of 12,392, however currently restricted to 11,409, Roots Hall is the largest football stadium in Essex. During the early 21st century there was lengthy discussion of a new 22,000-seat stadium at Fossetts Farm, but a change of club ownership in 2024 ended prospects of that development, with the new Southend United owners instead planning a redevelopment of Roots Hall, part-funded by housing developments at Fossetts Farm.

== History ==
=== Pre-Roots Hall (1900s–1940s) ===
The site now occupied by Roots Hall is where Southend United had originally played their home games on their formation in 1906. Upon the outbreak of the First World War the area was designated for storage and Southend were forced out. After the war the club elected to move to a new ground at the Kursaal and Roots Hall first became a quarry for sand then a tipping site.

=== Relocation to Roots Hall (1950s) ===
By the early 1950s Southend had moved to Southend Stadium off Sutton Road. The club did not own the ground and the dog track which encircled the pitch made it unsuitable for use as a football stadium. In 1952 the wasteland at the old Roots Hall site was purchased to build a new stadium for the club. Work on the ground could not begin immediately owing to the large quantities of rubbish which had been dumped on the site in the club's absence, which took nearly a year to clear. The stadium was built by Sid Broomfield and a small band of individuals at a cost of £73,997, supported by a small grant from the FA and funds raised by the Supporters Club. Following construction, the ground was donated to the club by the fans.

On 20 August 1955 Roots Hall hosted its first match, against Norwich City. The ground was declared open by the Secretary of the Football Association, Sir Stanley Rous. The ground remained the newest in the Football League until the opening of Scunthorpe United's Glanford Park in 1988.

Roots Hall's construction had not been completed when the ground was opened, with some stands only running for a short distance along the touchline and others waiting to be concreted over. In addition to these problems, the pitch's drainage was unsuitable and by the end of the 1955–56 season it had to be completely relaid.

=== Ground development (1960s) ===
With the pitch issue dealt with, Southend could concentrate on the matter at hand: completing the ground. The west bank roof, originally set back from the pitch, was extended forwards to the touchline creating a double-barrel effect, while work also commenced on finishing the terracing. The job was finally finished in 1964, after all 72 steps of the giant south bank had been concreted. The east stand was extended in both directions so it ran the full length of the touchline in 1966, and around the same time the club installed floodlighting. Finally the ground was finished, and had its finest day in 1979, when a ground record 31,033 fans packed the Hall to watch Liverpool in action in the FA Cup.

=== Modernisation (1980s–2010s) ===
By the mid-1980s, however, the club were struggling financially. In an effort to keep the club afloat, most of the south bank was sold off in 1988, and eventually the remainder was replaced in 1994 by a small two tiered all-seater stand, designed by then club chairman Vic Jobson. All this came after the west and east stands saw work in 1992, when the west bank was turned into an all-seated stand and the paddocks in the east had seating attached. The final stage of development at the Hall came in 1995, when the west stand roof was extended at either end to meet the south and north stands, with seating being installed in the north-west corner of the ground.

The ownership of Ron Martin from 1998 onwards saw some investment in the ground's facilities in the early 2000s with the opening of a new ticket office and club shop, replacement of the old style turnstiles with modern electronic ones, and extension of executive accommodation at the rear of the east stand. A new digital scoreboard was added to the north stand roof in November 2012 replacing the old incandescent scoreboard, one of the last of its kind in the UK, which had ceased functioning several years earlier. However this period saw no major redevelopment and expenditure on maintenance dwindled to a bare minimum as the club faced increasing financial woes which would eventually led to visible deterioration around the ground and culminated in capacity restrictions being imposed on the "crumbling" stadium by safety authorities in the 2020s.

=== Proposed relocation to Fossetts Farm ===
In the 1990s Southend United started planning to leave Roots Hall for a proposed new ground at Fossetts Farm. In January 2007, the club received planning permission from both Southend and Rochford councils for the stadium, retail outlets, a hotel and new training facilities but this was subject to rubber-stamping from the Secretary of State. The Department for Communities and Local Government gave broad approval to the plans in March 2008 and planning permission was granted later the same month for the HOK-designed new stadium. Roots Hall has been sold to Sainsbury's, which has received planning permission to build a new supermarket on the site. Building work on Fossetts Farm was due to start in 2014, however due to issues with the supermarket development, as Sainsbury's had yet to complete the purchase of the former Prospects College site, which was required for access to the new store, work failed to commence.

In April 2017 new plans were submitted for the work which no longer involved Sainsbury's. However, it took a further four years before firm plans emerged. Plans were approved in October 2021; the 22,000-capacity stadium would incorporate a 107-bed hotel and high-rise residential blocks of 182 homes on two corners, but in September 2022, the hotel plans were dropped in favour of 42 additional homes, and a revised planning application also outlined plans to lower the stadium capacity to 16,226 seats. Scaled-back plans for the ground were eventually submitted to the council in late March 2023.

However, following agreement on the club's sale to the Justin Rees consortium on 3 October 2023, it was proposed the club would remain at Roots Hall, with the 500 homes once planned for the site now transferred to Fossetts Farm. Negotiations over the club's sale continued into mid-2024 as the deal remained conditional upon Southend Council's approval of property transactions. On 23 May 2024, after a council update, the Rees consortium said it was becoming "increasingly concerned" that processes would not be completed. On 7 June 2024, the new council leader Daniel Cowan blamed the previous administration for assurances that "fell outside of normal practice and were simply not achievable"; a week later, he confirmed the proposed development had failed the council's due diligence process. Citizen Housing and the Martin family were given until 21 June 2024 to respond to new council proposals. Citizen Housing missed the council's deadline, but there was sufficient progress to persuade Cowan to continue negotiations about new heads of terms ready for new due diligence. Nonetheless, the Shrimpers Trust warned that they would start a phoenix club and make Roots Hall an asset of community value if needed.

=== Takeover and redevelopment (2020s) ===
On 19 July 2024 the consortium finally completed its takeover of Southend United. They were able to make this happen by separating the transaction of property from the takeover deal, with Roots Hall initially remaining under Martin's ownership but with a £1 lease agreed for over 20 years, and a path to acquire the freehold "well within that timeframe". Martin will also provide "a significant contribution" for Roots Hall to be developed using the profits acquired from property development at the Fossetts Farm site.

The first few weeks under new ownership saw immediate investment to bring the ground up to scratch including a new video scoreboard, new external signage and increased bar capacity. In September 2024 the consortium announced "medium-term" plans to increase the stadium's capacity by opening part of the North Bank to home supporters, to introduce a "Fan Zone" outside the stadium, to replace the floodlights with more efficient LEDs, and to bring forward plans to more widely refurbish the West and South Stands, and replace the East Stand entirely. The North Bank was reopened to home supporters in December 2024.

In June 2025, the club appointed AFL Architects to work on redeveloping Roots Hall, seeking a 'community-driven transformation' of the ground.

During April 2026 it was announced that the North West Corner section of the ground had been reopened for home supporters to use, meaning nearly all of the stadium is now available. A sellout crowd against West Ham in a pre season friendly displayed the usable capacity at Roots Hall to be 10,500.

== Structure ==
=== East Stand ===
The East Stand is the main stand at Roots Hall, running along one side of the pitch. Originally designed as a section of seating with paddocks of terracing below, it was converted to an all seater stand in the 1990s. The stand also contains executive boxes and, in the back, the club offices. The dugouts are cut into the stand, covered by the main roof. The stand was originally much smaller and evidence of its extension along the touchline can be seen in the density of moss on the roof. According to the club website this stand contains 2,636 seats. However, since the COSU ownership of the club came in. Work has been done to the D2 lounge and other corporate areas meaning the capacity of the stand could be larger than this. but recently a small block of seats on the far right side was removed to house training goals. Currently, Block A of the stand is used for housing the players friends and families, however an extra 200 seats can be made available if needed. 99 Seats of Block A currently cannot be used due to safety concerns over entrance and exits. It is currently named the Climatec Group East Stand.

=== South Stand ===
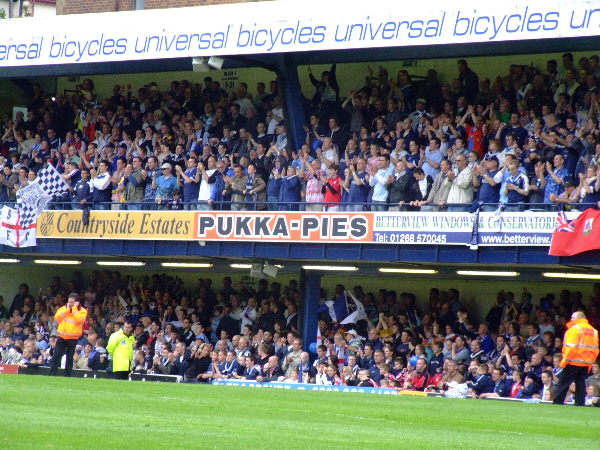
South Stand

Originally a 72-step terrace, financial troubles in the mid-1990s saw the old terrace reduced dramatically before being replaced by a significantly smaller two-tier stand. The bottom tier forms part of the family enclosure and can facilitate 1137 fans, alongside part of the West Stand. The Upper tier is slightly smaller than the Lower tier, holding 934 supporters. According to the club website this stand contains 2,071 seats. It is currently named the wefinanceanycar.com South Stand.

=== West Stand ===
The West Stand was also formerly a terrace, though it was converted into a stand by bolting seats (purchased second hand from Manchester City F.C.) onto the existing structure, there is speculation as to where the West Stand runs to, as the North West Corner is not a well documented part of the ground. The current capacity of the stand from blocks Q to W is 3,459 . Originally the terrace only ran the length of the touch-line but when the ground was improved in the 1990s the north-west corner was filled-in. This section is sometimes used for away supporters, depending on demand. The roof has a unique double-barrelled construction; originally the stand's cover was set back from the pitch, and when the club constructed cover for the front section of the old terrace they built another identical span. A small section of the West Stand alongside the lower tier in the South Stand has been designated as the family area. In August 2022, the club announced that the stand would be sponsored by estate agents Gilbert & Rose, becoming the Gilbert & Rose West stand, drawing attention online as it included the name of serial killer Rose West. The club announced later the same day that the stand would be renamed again. It is now known as the "Gilbert & Rose Stand".

=== North Stand ===
The North Stand, also known as the North Bank, is another converted terrace with a total capacity of 2222. The roof has a semi-circular 'barrel' shape, similar to the West Stand's original roof, with a scoreboard in the centre. Since its reopening in December 2024, the North Bank has been split, holding just under 1100 home fans in the left side and 815 away supporters in the right side. Around 400 seats are covered as a segregation area in between the fans. However, if required the whole of the North bank can be allocated to away supporters for events such as cup matches, as happened against teams such as Manchester United F.C. and Chelsea F.C. Despite the stand having been primarily allocated to away supporters since the mid-1990s many Blues fans regard it as their 'spiritual home', and strong demand for home supporters to return to the stand led to them being readmitted for a period from 2010 to 2013 and again from December 2024 onwards. It is currently named the Solopress North Bank.

=== North West Corner ===
The North West Corner is made up of blocks X, Y and Z and can hold 1,326 people when in use. It was initially terracing when it was created back in the 1960s. In 1995 it was converted into seating at the same time as the West Stand and other parts of the ground. The roof was extended from the west and the north stands to cover the North-west Corner.

When a team brings a large away following, blocks Y and Z can be allocated to away supporters allowing them to bring up to 2,800 supporters.

The corner had been shut due to lack of maintenance. But for the 2026-27 season, both blocks were fully opened for home fans to buy Season Tickets in for the first time.
