= Ron Martin (businessman) =

British businessman (born 1953)

- Born: Ronald Martin; 17 January 1953 (age 73)
- Occupation: former CEO of Martin Dawn PLC

Ronald Martin (born 17 January 1953) is a British businessman who was chief executive of Martin Dawn PLC, an Essex, United Kingdom-based property development company, and chairman of Southend United Football Club from 2000 to 2024.

After taking an ownership stake in Southend United in November 1998, he championed its move to a proposed new stadium at Fossetts Farm during financial struggles, including 19 winding-up petitions, at the club. Under his ownership, the club was promoted to the Championship (second tier of English football) but then, between 2007 and 2021, dropped to the fifth tier National League. In October 2023, a deal was agreed in which Martin would sell the club to new owners. The sale was finally completed in July 2024. Martin's almost 25 years in charge was "widely seen – both by fans and more dispassionate observers – as one of the most disastrous chairmanships in modern football." Martin retained an involvement with Fossetts Farm, now a prospective housing-only development expected to start in 2026.

Following a dispute with McLaren Construction Limited, Martin Dawn PLC was wound up by order of the High Court on 25 February 2025 and Martin was declared bankrupt on 6 January 2026.

== Sports career ==
Reports suggest Martin was a member of the Great Britain 1980 Winter Olympics bobsleigh team - a claim Martin made in a local newspaper interview in February 2000. In 2009, the East London and West Essex Guardian reported that in the 1970s he "was on-standby to join the Great Britain bobsleigh team. The call never came".

== Business career ==
A construction and property development business, Martin Dawn (Essex) Limited, was incorporated on 3 November 1983 with Ron Martin named as one of its directors. The company changed its name to Martin-Dawn Ltd on 12 February 1987, and became Martin Dawn plc on 6 February 1995.

=== Southend United (1998–2024) ===
Martin Dawn PLC and Delancey Estates, together forming South Eastern Leisure (SEL), took control of Southend United in November 1998, buying the club and its centrally located Roots Hall ground for £4m from then chairman Vic Jobson who, at the time, owned 55% of the issued share capital of the club. Jobson had previously sold part of the ground's South Bank for housing, and SEL's plan was to continue the redevelopment and move the club to a proposed 16,000-seat stadium in a leisure redevelopment in the northern part of Southend.

John Main replaced Jobson as Southend United chairman, but was uneasy about the club having to pay £400,000 annual rent to its new owners, and about Ron Martin's motives ("How can he argue for the club, particularly against SEL, if he jointly owns SEL and his main interest is in making money from the property deal?"). Two years later, in September 2000, Main was ousted as a condition of a £1.5m investment by Delancy Estates, and replaced by Martin.

In September 2001, it was claimed that Southend United could remain at Roots Hall after a deal was proposed between property developers Lansbury and Delancey. Negotiations continued into 2002, with a deal announced in December 2002, allowing the club to remain at Roots Hall for three years while plans for Fossetts Farm were developed.

In March 2006, Martin bought out Delancy's shareholding in Southend United, and planned a new Council submission about a combined 17,000-seat stadium, retail and leisure development at Fossetts Farm. On 3 August 2006, local media reported that work was to start in 2007 on a £25 million 22,000 super-stadium. Martin stated that "plans are at an advanced stage now" and added that they would be submitted in late September 2006, after which there will be a 16-week public consultation. The new ground has been designed by Populous, formerly known as HOK Sport.

In January 2007, Southend Borough Council gave planning permission for a new 22,000-seater stadium at the proposed Fossetts Farm site, with Rochford District Council following suit 24 hours later. On 6 March 2008, permission to develop Fossetts Farm was given by the government. However, it took a further 12 years before firm plans emerged for the development. In April 2020, a deal was agreed between Southend United, the borough council and social housing provider Citizen Housing. Established in 2018, Citizen was a joint venture between Lenrose Housing and Allied Commercial Exporters, the UK investment vehicle of property tycoons the Dellal family, and was fronted by Ron Martin's son, Jack Martin. Plans approved in October 2021 included a 22,000-capacity stadium with a 107-bed hotel and high-rise residential blocks of 182 homes on two corners, but the hotel plan was later dropped and the proposed stadium capacity was reduced to 16,226 seats.

==== Financial troubles ====
During the 2009–10 season, Southend faced two winding-up orders from HM Revenue and Customs over unpaid tax bills. In February 2010 Southend players were not paid, the Professional Footballers Association had to pay the players, and the club were placed under a transfer embargo until they paid the money back. In March 2010 Southend were given a 35-day extension to pay the unpaid bill or face administration, and further seven day extension in April 2010. On 20 April 2010 the bill was paid, and in August 2010 all actions against Southend United were dropped and an agreement was reached with HMRC.

It later emerged that Martin had re-mortgaged his home to stop the club going bust, borrowing £750,000 against his £1.6m home in Benfleet, to help clear a £338,000 tax debt and stop the club being forced into administration. The 2010 bailout was part of a total of around £13.5m of his own or borrowed money that Martin had ploughed into the club since 1999. According to its 2012 accounts, the club was effectively insolvent but remained a "going concern", thanks to support from Martin Dawn Plc and South Eastern Leisure. Martin had also faced legal action from individuals and firms, including solicitors, a neuro specialist and Anglian Water, to settle bills and, in 2013, agreed a repayment plan with former club chief executive Tara Brady over a £150,000 debt.

In 2014, Martin paid £460,000 to acquire the prefabricated structure of the former David Beckham Academy in Greenwich, London, for use as an all-weather training facility for the club. However, he was unable to pay for its erection and maintenance. In May 2024, the metal structures were unused, rusting away, and covered in weeds and brambles around the perimeter of Southend's training ground.

In December 2019, financial difficulties resulted in non-payment of players' and other employees' wages, after which players consulted with the PFA. Martin paid £140,000 after seven senior players did not receive their December 2019 wages on time, and met with all players to reassure them it would not happen again. The winding-up petition was dismissed after debts were cleared, but continued financial constraints prevented the club signing any new players during the January 2020 transfer window. On 2 March, Martin confirmed Southend was under an EFL transfer embargo due to an unpaid tax bill, while February's wages to players were not paid on time, resulting in further PFA involvement. On 9 March, Southend was charged with misconduct by the EFL for failing to pay players on time, and for fielding an ineligible player

On 2 June, Southend received a suspended three-point penalty and were fined £7,500 for those offences. On 11 March, a further HMRC winding-up petition was adjourned to 29 April, and was then adjourned three more times, eventually to 28 October 2020, when the club finally settled tax debts of £493,931 with HMRC. As a result, a winding-up petition was dismissed by the High Court. Meanwhile, on 2 April 2020, during the COVID-19 pandemic in the United Kingdom, Southend put "several staff and some players" on furlough (temporary leave) under the UK Government's emergency job retention scheme. Martin said "It enables the club to best manage its finances during this time of limited income", but the move was criticised by the PFA, which said the club had "consistently" let players down over wages.

In April 2021, former Southend player Stan Collymore wrote to Martin offering to buy the club from him, and held talks concerning the potential appointment of a Collymore associate as the club's CEO.

==== Relegation from Football League ====
Under Martin's chairmanship Southend suffered a second successive relegation on 1 May 2021, dropping out of the English Football League after 101 years. Supporters demonstrated and called for his resignation, but he said: "the future will be great again". He also said League Two relegation was "unfair" as the National League had suspended relegation for the COVID-19-affected season, and submitted proposals for EFL consideration.

==== Continued financial troubles ====
In August 2021, Southend revealed its overall debt in July 2019 was £17.4m, having grown by £2.4m. Martin said the majority of the debt was owed to his companies, and that £6.8m of debt had already been written off. With the club struggling near the foot of the National League, Southend fans staged protests at Roots Hall on 5 and 9 October 2021, demanding Martin's departure. Collymore offered further free support to the club, described as "a mess" by the BBC:

"The club is a mess, with the chairman pushing on with his plans for a new stadium while Roots Hall slowly falls into a dilapidated state. With the club already on life support, emergency surgery is the order of the day if it is not to sink further."

On 30 September 2022, the club was placed under a transfer embargo after a missed payment to HMRC. On the following day, fans staged protests at Roots Hall after shirt sponsors PG Site Services withdraw their support of the club. A fans' group, "Save Our Southend", blamed "the utter ineptitude of Ron Martin in running the club properly", saying they judged him "to be an unfit and improper owner". In a statement, Martin blamed a programme delay for a missed payment under the club's Time To Pay Agreement with HMRC, which he said HMRC then cancelled prematurely. He said bridging finance would enable the club to discharge its HMRC debt in full. Nonetheless, in October 2022, HMRC issued a winding-up petition - due to be heard at the High Court on 9 November, it was adjourned to 18 January 2023.

With the club's final accounts for the year to 31 July 2020 still not filed, being overdue since April 2021, on 3 January 2023, Companies House issued a first Gazette notice to have the company struck off. (Note: The club's accounts for 2020 and 2021 were eventually submitted to Companies House on 31 May 2023. The 2021 accounts showed the club made a loss of £1,003,992 on a turnover of £3,954,593 (the club's 2022 accounts had not been submitted by the 30 April 2023 deadline).) On 18 January 2023, the HMRC winding-up hearing was adjourned again, until 1 March 2023. In a 25 January statement, Martin could not "outline precise timings" regarding the bridging finance to be applied against the "large" HMRC debt; Martin was later reported to be seeking a £5m loan to pay debts including £1.4m in unpaid tax owed to HMRC. The Shrimpers Trust did not expect the club to make a loan repayment due at the start of February, and, with players and other staff unpaid for January, anxious fans started planning a 'phoenix club' and there were unsuccessful attempts to engage with Martin over a possible sale of the club.

On 10 February 2023, St John Ambulance said it would no longer provide first aid staff at Southend United home games because of outstanding fees, forcing the club to find alternative medical cover ahead of an FA Trophy tie with York City. The following day, Martin said finding the money to clear the club's HMRC debt by 1 March "will be close" but he "will not let the club be wound-up". He described the debt as a legacy of unpaid PAYE for players' wages from when Southend was in Leagues One and Two. Martin said: "Raising the funds is my primary focus. ... However, if we get past this current trauma, the future for the club is bright." Players' January wages remained unpaid ahead of Southend's 25 February game at Torquay United, and were eventually paid 28 days late while other staff had not been paid since November.

Less than 24 hours before the winding-up hearing, the club said it had paid the £1.4m tax bill, adding that "funds as working capital" had also been injected into the club. After a brief hearing at the Insolvency and Companies Court on 1 March 2023, the winding-up petition was dismissed after HMRC confirmed the debt had been paid. However, the transfer embargo remained in place; sponsors, angry at being kept in the dark, talked of taking legal action against the club; and supporters groups, fearing "the next crisis could be just around the corner", highlighted owner "inadequacies" and said a new beginning would only be possible "when a new structure and ownership is in place".

==== Martin puts club up for sale ====
On 17 March 2023, Martin and the board of directors commenced a formal process to explore the sale of the club or to bring in new investment partners. With Martin set to own any stadium at Fossetts Farm, the Shrimpers Trust urged Southend Council to use its planning powers to ensure the stadium remained in the club's ownership.

On 14 April, shirt sponsor PG Site Services said it would stop sponsoring the club "due to a breakdown of our relationship with the current owner RM and his conduct". On 30 April, the club finished their second season in the National League in 8th position, outside the promotion and play-off places; staff at the club had not been paid for the past two months. On 4 May, the club was served another winding-up petition by HMRC, and was due to appear in the High Court on 17 May. Three companies, including PG Site Services and Engie Power, joined the winding-up petition regarding a £275,000 debt; the petition hearing—the club's 18th—was adjourned to 12 July 2023, giving Martin more time to sell the club.

Meanwhile, on 11 May 2023, football finance expert Kieran Maguire criticised Martin's combative approach to HMRC. Maguire said head coach Kevin Maher and other backroom staff were running out of patience, adding that Martin had "seen Roots Hall as an opportunity to make money from a property perspective and your heart goes out to the people working there who don't know how long they've got a job there or have any certainty at the start of every month whether or not they will be paid."

On 31 May 2023, the club had to secure a court order unfreezing a bank account to enable them to pay players (keeping them at the club) and accountants, but some "back of house" staff were still awaiting "March and/or April" wages in early June. Players and backroom staff again went unpaid at the end of June 2023, and players refused to resume pre-season training until they were paid while considering their future with the club. On 5 July 2023, another club sponsor, Midex PRO, withdrew its support due to "the current situation with the club's owners". On 12 July, the winding-up hearing was adjourned again, to 23 August 2023, to allow further time for the sale to be concluded, amid doubts about the club's ability to meet National League requirements, with Maguire now describing Southend as "one of the worst run clubs in the country".

On 17 July 2023, Martin said he would sell his stake in the club for £1, but wanted £4.5m for Roots Hall. The club also needed £1m "in the short term" to settle its latest HMRC winding-up petition and lift a transfer embargo. On 20 July, Kimura Capital stated that they were no longer interested in leading a bid for the club but were reported to be involved in discussions with a group of unidentified businessmen to save the club. However, in late July 2023, Martin told protesting fans—who he blamed for deterring potential bidders—that nobody had yet made him an offer on his terms.

On 21 July 2023, the club was given court permission to pay £300,000 in football-related debts to remain in the National League. Martin promised to notify other creditors, which include HMRC—owed £275,000—and energy supplier Npower, of the payment. This had to be approved by the court as the club was insolvent; any future payments would also have to be notified and approved in the same way. Club staff were paid wages dating back up to three months on 26 July 2023, and were finally up to date with their wages (and July's wages were paid on time). The National League welcomed the club's payments to football creditors, licencing the club to participate in the 2023–2024 season, but required it to pay its HMRC debt in full by 23 August 2023 (adjournment of the court hearing would not postpone this requirement) and to ensure all future football creditors or HMRC debts were cleared on time to the satisfaction of the League during the 2023–2024 season. A breach of these conditions would result in an immediate and automatic 10 points deduction.

On 15 August 2023, former club chief executive Tara Brady confirmed he had tried to buy Southend United in July, only to be rebuffed by Martin.

On 23 August 2023, the winding-up hearing was adjourned again, to 4 October 2023, with Judge Prentis telling Martin if he was in charge of any other business it would have been wound up. As part of the £275,000 HMRC debt remained outstanding (in addition, Npower was owed a similar amount and electrical contractor Emersons was owed £600,000k), the club were deducted 10 points by the National League (it appealed against the penalty). Martin told the court he was "confident" a sale to an Australian buyer—later named as Justin Rees—would be finalised by the end of September. The judge said the club would be wound up if that deadline was missed. Despite his earlier confidence, Martin subsequently said he was unsure if this deadline would be met; there were two potential buyers but discussions with the Rees consortium were "more advanced". On 7 September 2023, Southend Council committed to considering investment in the club if it would aid its survival, potentially by buying Roots Hall for Martin's £4.5M asking price.

On 19 September 2023, the club was due to appear at Basildon magistrates' court in a civil matter relating to a disputed power bill; the 'application for warrant of entry' was rescheduled for Chelmsford High Court on 3 October 2023. The club's match against Maidenhead United that evening was briefly interrupted by fans throwing toy rats and tennis balls onto the pitch in another protest against Martin.

On 20 September 2023, a statement was released by the Rees consortium. Acknowledged the complexity of any deal, the consortium said it had made two bids to Martin, but neither had been accepted, and "it now seems unlikely that any deal can be agreed prior to the 4th of October court appearance date". The consortium understood Martin would ensure the club avoided liquidation on 4 October, but the threat of administration remained. Full details of the consortium's bid were not released, but—due to "the non-viability of a new stadium at Fossetts Farm"—it involved retaining and upgrading Roots Hall as the club's stadium, and taking ownership of the stadium and the club's training ground, with Martin contributing funds towards the redevelopment of Roots Hall.

Fans staged an anti-Martin protest march to Roots Hall ahead of the club's National League tie against AFC Fylde on 23 September 2023. Southend fielded a 14-man squad, and lost the game 2–1.

==== Sale of club agreed ====
On 3 October 2023, the club confirmed that they had reached an agreement for the sale of the club to the Justin Rees consortium, with a formal takeover and completion date of 1 November, later revised to 17 November 2023 and then the end of the month. With details of the rescue deal yet to be finalised, reports suggested the club would remain at Roots Hall, with the 500 homes once planned for the site now transferred to Fossetts Farm. The deal was announced the day before the High Court hearing of HMRC's winding-up petition, amid reports that the HMRC debt had now been paid, and the winding-up petition was duly dismissed.

On 5 December, the consortium said due diligence had raised important issues which had required further time to resolve, and some legal and procedural work remained. The exact completion date would be confirmed "once it is locked in". On 23 December 2023, Martin and the Rees consortium exchanged contracts for the sale of the club; the deal remained conditional upon Southend Council's approval of certain property transactions and the club ownership was expected to be formally transferred in early 2024. In March 2024, Southend CEO Tom Lawrence said final completion of the club's takeover could still be a couple of months away, being dependent upon a council review of the housing shift to Fossets Farm, though it later emerged that obtaining the consent of Ron and son Jack Martin's finance partner (CBRE) was also delaying matters. As a result, one impatient creditor, Stewarts Law, petitioned for the club to be wound up (the club's 19th such petition); the High Court hearing was subsequently adjourned. On 6 April, Ron Martin said he expected to have sold the club by mid-May 2024.

In May 2024, with the deal still to be completed, Martin's almost 25 years in charge was, according to Guardian writer Tim Burrows, "widely seen – both by fans and more dispassionate observers – as one of the most disastrous chairmanships in modern football."

By 8 May 2024, it was clear the sale would not be completed by mid-May. The council's due diligence over plans for the housing at Fossetts Farm continued, while CBRE had yet to consent to the payment structure for the Roots Hall refurbishment. At the club's winding-up petition hearing on 15 May, the consortium and Martin sought a six-week adjournment, supported by Stewarts Law. The club was given six weeks to settle with creditors or face liquidation. As a consequence of the unresolved winding-up order, Southend was placed under a fresh transfer embargo on 17 May 2024. On 23 May 2024, after a Council update and having provided £3.5m in funding to Southend, the Rees consortium said it was becoming "increasingly concerned" that processes would not be completed before the 26 June High Court winding-up hearing.

On 28 May 2024, City A.M. reported the City of London-based law firm Taylor Wessing was suing Martin over an unpaid legal bill of almost £400,000, having been retained by Martin Dawn plc to provide employment and other legal services to the club.

On 7 June 2024, the consortium ("Custodians of Southend United", COSU) said Southend United could go out of business because a property element of the contract might not be signed ahead of the 26 June winding-up hearing date. Southend Council and the Martins were in renewed negotiations about the deal. The newly elected council leader, Daniel Cowan, blamed the previous administration for assurances that "fell outside of normal practice and were simply not achievable". The Fossetts Farm housing developer (Citizen Housing) was said to be modelling a new proposal that would help safeguard the council from judicial review. On 14 June 2024, Cowan confirmed the proposed development had failed the council's due diligence process, and Citizen Housing was given until 21 June 2024 to respond to new council proposals.

Finally, on 19 July 2024, the COSU consortium completed its takeover of Southend United. Justin Rees replaced Martin as chairman.

=== Fossetts Farm ===
At that time, the Fossetts Farm development remained subject to due diligence by the city council. Earlier, on 4 July 2024, the planned number of homes at Fossetts Farm had been cut by 500. Plans for up to 1,300 homes in apartment blocks seven to eight storeys high were scrapped. The plans proposed 800 to 850 homes in buildings no higher than four storeys, leased by Ron Martin to Southend Council under a build-to-rent finance scheme. The Fossetts Farm plans were discussed and approved by the council in 21 December 2024, though construction of 805 family homes was unlikely to start before 2026. In March 2025, the council confirmed funders had backed amended proposals; a planning application for about 805 homes would be submitted by Thames Plaza, in partnership with the local authority, with up to £12m to go towards refurbishment and regeneration of the Roots Hall stadium.

=== Disputes with McLaren Construction ===
In December 2013, Martin provided a personal guarantee to McLaren Construction relating to the liabilities of three companies in which he had a controlling interest. In February 2018, McLaren demanded payment under the guarantee, and in October 2018 issued a statutory demand claiming £7.1m. Martin disputed the validity of the demand, and the case was heard in the Insolvency and Companies Court in July 2019, when the demand was set aside as McLaren had previously failed to serve a formal notice.

In October 2020, Martin entered into a £7.9m loan agreement with McLaren Construction (previously a bidder to build the Fossetts Farm stadium) relating to a proposed housing development on greenbelt land at Castle Point. However, Castle Point Council rejected proposals to remove the site's greenbelt designation, and McLaren's Living subsidiary did not attempt to obtain planning permission. After McLaren issued statutory demands for repayment of the loan by Martin and his company, the businessman counter-claimed, accusing McLaren Construction and Living of unlawfully "conspiring with an intention to cause financial loss" to his firms. The claim and counter-claim were heard in the Insolvency and Companies Court in November 2024. In a judgement handed down in February 2025, judge Paul Greenwood said there was no evidence to prove the conspiracy, concluded that Martin had failed in his bid to set aside the statutory demands, ordered the winding up of Martin Dawn plc, and granted McLaren "leave to present a bankruptcy petition against Mr Martin on or after 3 March 2025."

On 6 January 2026, after a hearing at the Chief Insolvency and Companies Court, Martin was declared bankrupt, with debts of over £49 million, on a petition presented by McLaren Construction. Martin's bankruptcy was "expected to result in a significant balance-sheet write-off" concerning money paid to keep Southend United running before the COSU takeover.

== Fraud investigation ==
In 2007, Martin's home and offices were searched and he was later arrested during a fraud investigation concerning a planning application unrelated to his football club interests. He helped with police enquiries and was not charged with any offences.
