= David Beckham Academy =

Former football school founded by David Beckham

Coordinates: 51.4974°N 0.0095°E

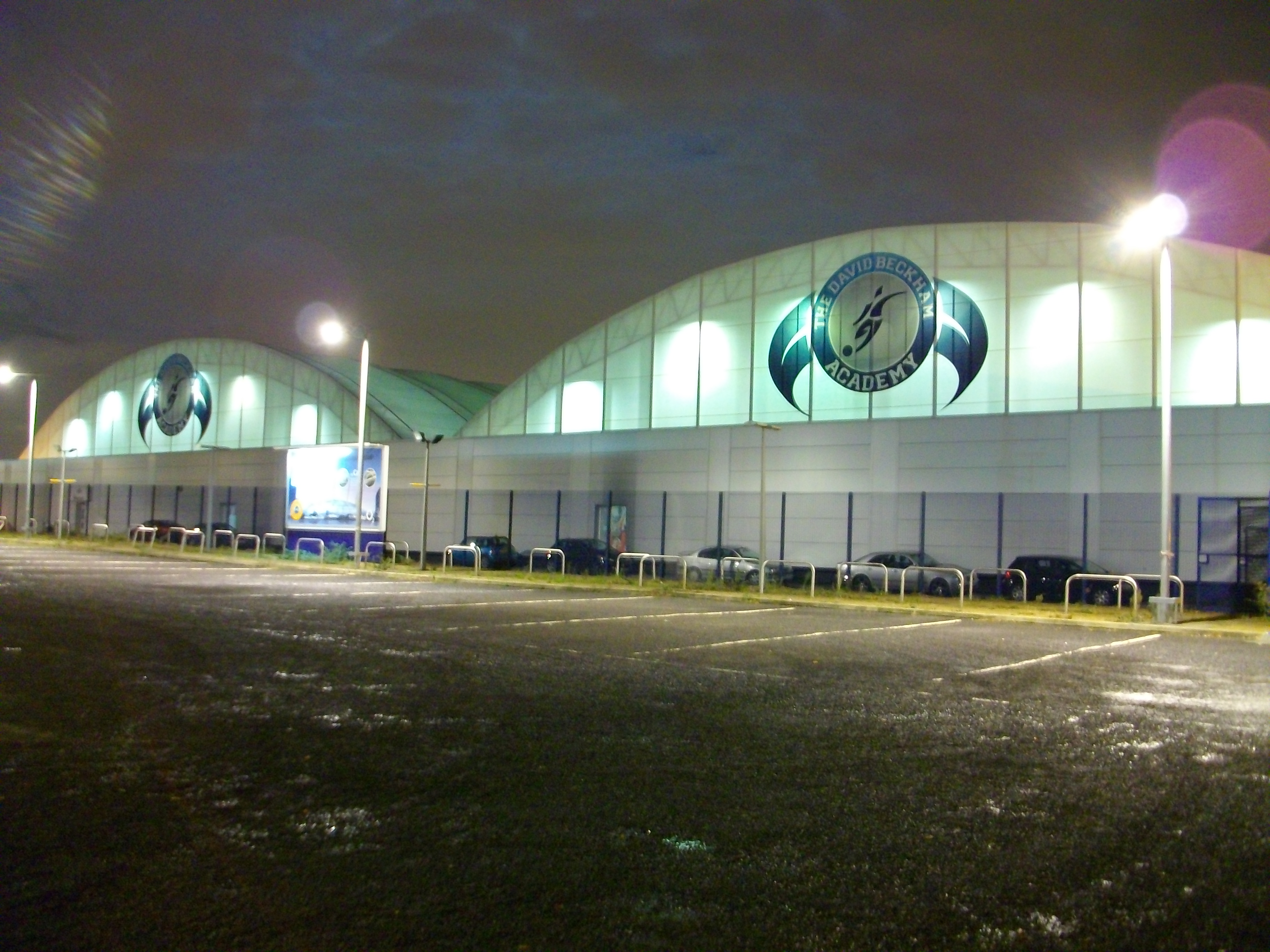
David Beckham Academy, London, at night, designed by RTKL and Buro Happold

The David Beckham Academy was a football school founded by England international David Beckham that existed from 2005 to 2009. It operated in two locations: London, United Kingdom and Los Angeles, California, United States. The Academy pulled out of the London site at the end of the lease in October 2009, and the California branch closed soon after.

Further Academy sites were planned at Cabo São Roque near Natal, Brazil, and in Manchester, but neither ever materialised.

== History ==
The Academy is said to have been inspired by Beckham's attendance as a boy at the Bobby Charlton Soccer School. Wanting to give later generations of children the same experience, he put his name to two facilities in 2005.

=== London ===
The Academy in London was situated on the Greenwich Peninsula in east Greenwich, close to The O_{2} and North Greenwich Underground station. Its temporary building was opened on 28 November 2005, with backing from the Anschutz Entertainment Group and sponsorship from Volkswagen Group and Adidas. Its indoor arena, built by London based company ES Global, housed two full-sized, artificially turfed pitches, alongside an education and administration centre, and a sports medical centre. It closed in 2009. Despite the millionaire player's backing, the London Academy's closure included redundancies among coaching and support staff, and deprived hundreds of children (including Beckham's niece and two nephews) from east and south-east London of their football training.

The facility was subsequently known as The London Soccerdome and used for football coaching though run by a different organisation. It closed in October 2014, with the site to be redeveloped into housing, and the dome structure being dismantled and transported to Southend-on-Sea to be part of a training facility for Southend United. However, ten years later (May 2024), the metal structures, bought by club chairman Ron Martin for £460,000, were lying unused, rusting away and covered in weeds and brambles around the perimeter of Southend's training ground.

=== California ===
The Los Angeles Academy was based at the Home Depot Center in Carson, California, on the campus of California State University, Dominguez Hills, which is a $150 million multi-sport facility built on 125 acres (0.51 km^{2}) of land (and home of Major League Soccer (MLS) team the Los Angeles Galaxy). The California branch also closed in late 2009.

== Programmes ==
The London Academy provided seventeen, three- or five-day programmes for boys and girls aged 8–15 years. It also ran a schools programme that consisted of a training day linked with Key Stage 2 and 3 learning (up to 2009, over 10,000 children had taken part in this programme). An after-schools programme (the 7/23 Club) was provided on Saturday mornings for children aged 3–7, and on Monday and Thursday evenings for 8-15-year-olds. The Los Angeles Academy ran a 7/23 Club on Saturday mornings for boys and girls aged 4–7 years, and three- and five-day courses during school holidays.

In early 2009, shortly before its closure, the 'David Beckham Academy' brand was extended to a range of books about football.
