= Kursaal (amusement park) =

Former amusement park building in Southend-on-Sea, England

The Kursaal
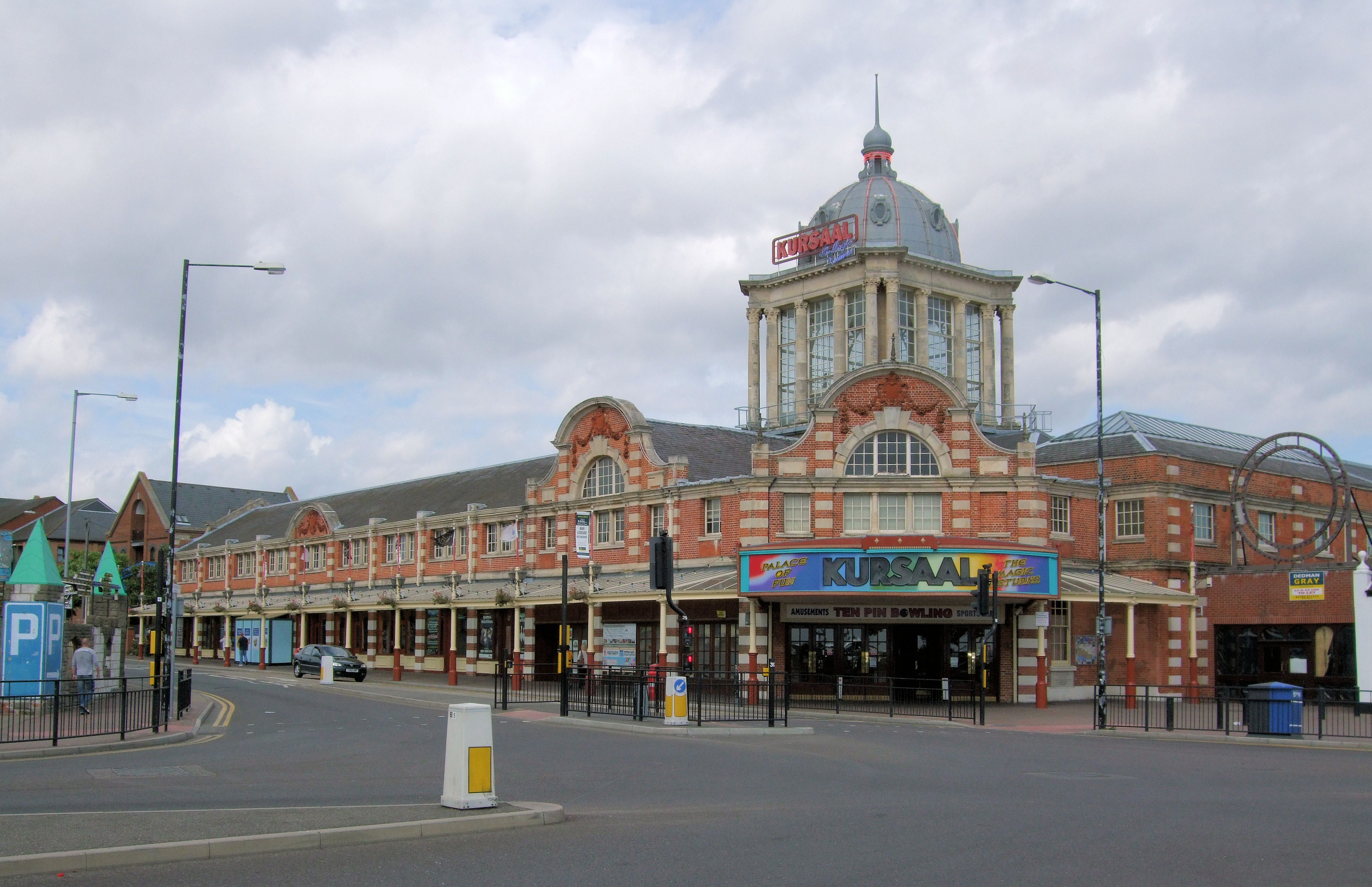
- View of the front of the Kursaal
- Interactive map of The Kursaal
- Location: Southend-on-Sea, Essex, United Kingdom
- Coordinates: 51.5331°N 0.7247°E
- Status: Operating
- Opened: 1901

The Kursaal (/ˈkɜːrzəl/) is a former amusement park and a Grade II listed building in Southend-on-Sea, Essex, England. The building, originally known as the Kursaal Palace was opened in 1901 as part of one of the world's first purpose-built amusement parks. The venue is noted for the main building with distinctive dome, designed by George Campbell Sherrin, which featured on a Royal Mail special stamp in 2011. The amusement park was home to Southend United F.C. between 1919 and 1934, and during this time also hosted greyhound racing. The majority of the park was closed in 1973, with the rest of the site closing in 1986. The building remained derelict until it was redeveloped in the late 1990s, opening again in 1998. Since 2020, the building again remains empty except for a small Tesco convenience store.

== History ==
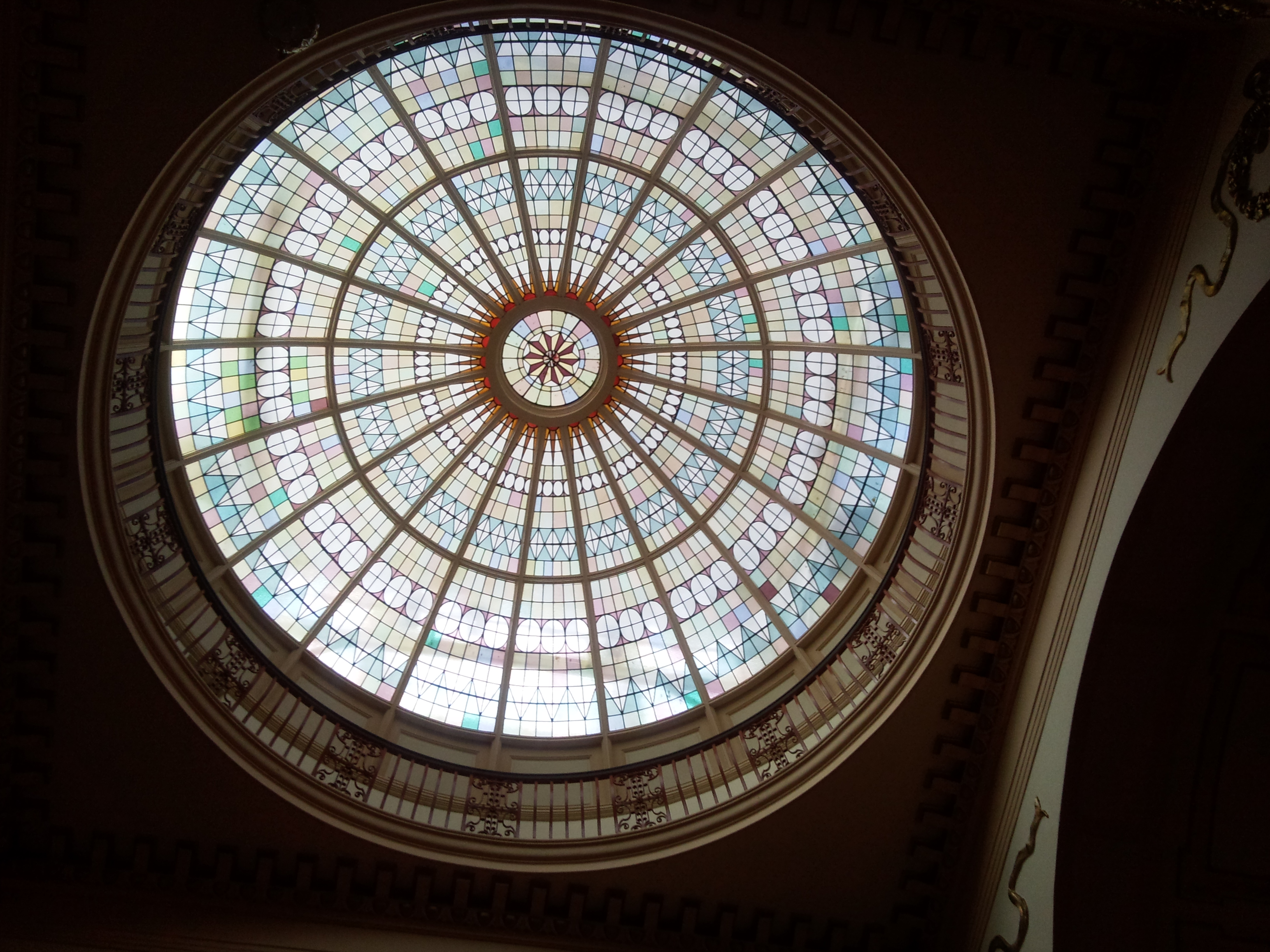
Interior look of the Kursaal dome

=== The arrival of Marine Park ===
The Kursaal site was opened in 1894 by Henry Austen on fifteen acres of land leased from solicitor Alfred Tollhurst and his son Bernard Wiltshire Tollhurst, as the Marine Park and Gardens. The park was designed by Henry Ernest Milner, consisted of gardens, with a bandstand, a 15,000 sq. foot sprung dance floor and a two-acre lake. Four acres of the site was enclosed by a cycle track, where football and cricket was played. Austen proposed to open a pavilion in the park to sell alcohol, but this was objected to by the Women's Temperance Movement, and the Tollhursts were so incensed by this that they announced that they would sell the site for housing.

In 1896, Pyramidical Syndicate Ltd purchased the site from the Tollhurst family, but with plans to expand the site as an amusement park, with a separate company, the Pyramidical Railway Company, running a new tower railway ride on the site, designed by William Darker Pitt. However, by 1897 a new venture had taken on the site, Tower and Marine Park Company, but not long after the business was incorporated as the Margate and Southend Kursaals Ltd to raise £175,000 to further develop the site, including plans for a structure in the style of the Eiffel Tower. The site at this time consisted of 26 leased acres and contained picturesque gardens with a trotting track surrounding a football pitch used by Southend Athletic. In July 1901 they opened a grand entrance pavilion, the Kursaal Palace, designed by George Sherrin and John Clarke, containing a circus, ballroom, arcade, dining hall and billiard room. The word Kursaal is German (literally meaning "cure hall") and refers to the main banquet hall of a spa town. The palace was opened by Lord Claud Hamilton, chairman of the Great Eastern Railway after arriving in a specially commissioned train. In 1903, the Margate and Southend Kursaals company was voluntary liquidated, and the site was put up for sale. Southend's Kursaal became the largest fairground in the south of England. In 1904 a screen was added to the ballroom so it could act as a cinema. There was controversy in 1908 when Princess Dinubolu of Senegal entered the Kursaal Beauty Pageant, the first black contestant.

=== Luna Park ===
In 1910, a new company was formed to purchase the site, Luna Park and Palace of Amusements (Southend) Ltd, which had been registered on 14 March 1910 by William Hilton. The park was renamed accordingly to Luna Park, and Hilton became the managing director of the park. Hilton opened a large list of attractions, including the Harton Scenic Railway and Figure of Eight roller coasters, a miniature railway, Astley's circus and a cinema, with the trotting track being removed. Luna Park was claiming 100,000 visitors per week; however, a June 1911 fire that started in the Haunted House, destroyed two of the park's most notable attractions, the Joy Wheel and the Figure of Eight Railway Coaster. The fire caused the company go into liquidation.

=== Purchase by the Morehouses ===
In 1912 American industrialist Clifton Jay Morehouse became the new owner of the park. Morehouse had arrived in London in 1897, settling in Birmingham later. He reinstated the park's original title of the 'Kursaal' and converted the circus into a ballroom and ice rink. He led the park to become one of the most successful in England at the time, establishing local sporting events and trade exhibitions. In 1916 a zoo housing bears, tigers and wolves was opened at the 4-acre (1.6-ha) site, however it was closed following the start of World War II.

Morehouse suddenly died in March 1920. His son David de Forrest Morehouse took over directorship.

In 1929, 11 people were seriously injured on the Flying Boat ride. In 1934 David de Forrest Morehouse died and a board of trustees took over the Kursaal. The Kursaal was closed to the public during World War II.

=== Post-war period to the 1970s ===
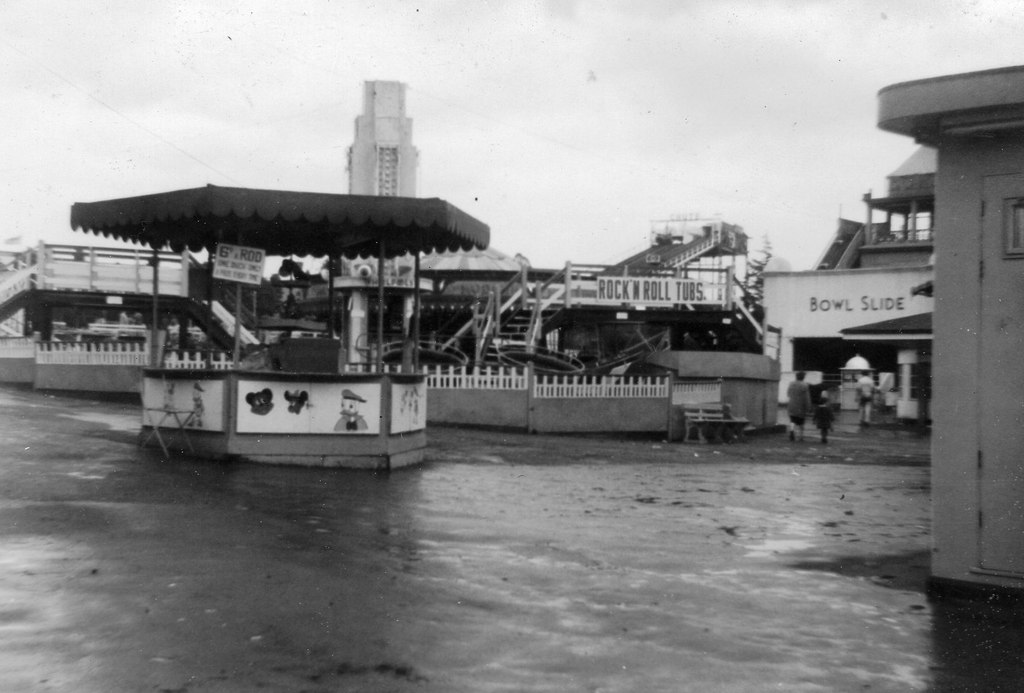
The Kursaal in 1964

In 1948 C. J. Morehouse II took over the Kursaal from the trustees. The ballroom of the Kursaal had hosted all manner of musical artistes following its opening in 1901. During the 1970s it made its name as Southend's preeminent rock music venue, showcasing internationally successful acts such as Black Sabbath, Deep Purple, Thin Lizzy, Queen and AC/DC. Status Quo used a recording from their 1975 set at the Kursaal for their single Roll Over Lay Down. A photograph of the performance of AC/DC at The Kursaal in 1977 was used on the front cover of their Let There Be Rock album.

=== Decline and closure ===
The Kursaal as a whole had been in gradual decline since the early 1970s, with a large area of the outdoor amusements closing in 1973. On the closed site, the Woodgrange Estate, commonly known as the Kursaal estate was built. At the end of 1977 the decision was made to close the ballroom, with the main building and the remaining external park areas finally succumbing in 1986. The remaining outdoor amusement area was later redeveloped as Mark Court. In 1988, Brent Walker purchased the Kursaal, and announced plans to redevelop the site as a water theme park, but the company entered liquidation and the site remained empty.

=== The 1998 reopening ===
The council purchased the Kursaal, and after a multimillion-pound redevelopment by the Rowallan Group, the main Kursaal building was reopened in 1998 with a bowling alley, a casino and other amusements. The building originally contained a McDonald's, but the fast food chain left in 2008.

The bowling alley closed permanently in 2019, and the casino closed permanently in 2020. This currently leaves only a Tesco Express store occupying part of this historic building. In May 2024, The Victorian Society listed the Kursaal amongst their 10 at risk sites that need rescuing.

=== Future ===
On 8 March 2026 it was announced that a deal had been reached to transfer the lease of the building to potential new owners Star Amusements, who plan to reopen the site in the near future as a leisure attraction.

== List of rides and attractions ==
- The Skids/Swirls
- Bumper Cars
- The Morehouse Galloper (1954–1973)
- Ski Jump
- Waltzer
- ROTOR (1960s)
- Wild Mouse (1960s)
- Calypso (1962–1983?)
- Cyclone, a roller coaster and the largest of the Kursaal's attractions at over 18 m (59 ft) high (1937–1973)
- Harton Scenic Railway (1910–1973)
- Switchback Railway
- 1st Water Chute (1921–1957)
- 2nd Water Chute (1958–1971)
- Toboggan Slide (1925–present) previously Ice Toboggan
- The Mont Blanc (1933–1973)
- Laff In The Dark (1938–1973)
- Aerial Flight (1894–1973)
- Figure of Eight Coaster (1910–1947)
- Arctic River Caves, a "£10,000 superstructure from Earl's Court"
- Joy Wheel, introduced by new owners the Luna Park Company (c. 1910)
- Bowl Slide
- Airsport (?–1973)
- Miniature Railway
- The Whip (1921–?)
- The Tumblers (1921–?)
- Never Stop Railway (1923–?)
- Autodrome (1927–?)
- Wall Of Death (1929–?)
- Midget Mansion (1930–?)
- Caterpillar
- Jolly Tubes (1920s–?)
- Whirlpool (<1950s–1973)
- Dive Bomber (1950s–1959)
- Noahs Ark (1953–?)
- Ghost Train (1931–?)
- Petboats (1933–?)
- Mountain Dipper (1933–?)
- The Whirlwind Racer (1930s–?)
- Tumblebug (1938–?)
- Seaplane (1938–?)
- Stratosphere or Stratosphere Rocket (1945–?)
- The Under & Over (?–1973)
- Knock the lady out of bed
- Kelly's house or Kelly's cottage (destroyed by fire)

== Kursaal Cinema ==
The park first added a screen to the ballroom in 1904, but in 1910 a new hall was built to house the cinema permanently, with it being named the Kursaal Kinema from October 1913. The cinema had a 25 feet wide proscenium and a small stage, but it closed along with the rest of the park during World War I when the site was used by the army. The cinema re-opened after a refurbishment in 1920, and in 1938 the name changed to the more traditional spelling of Kursaal Cinema. The cinema officially closed in July 1940 because of World War II, and after the war was converted into the function suite called the Estuary room.

== List of musical acts who performed at The Kursaal Ballroom and Estuary Room ==
- 1968 - The Move
- 1968 - The Herd
- 1968 - The Troggs
- 1970 - Argent / Juicy Lucy / Stackridge
- 1971 - Brian Auger's Oblivion Express / Egg / Gentle Giant
- 1971 - Parliament-Funkadelic
- 1971 - Sha Na Na / Uriah Heep / Paladin
- 1971 - James Gang
- 1972 - Stray / Sam Apple Pie
- 1972 - Family
- 1972 - Screaming Lord Sutch and the Savages / Flamin' Groovies / Shakin' Stevens and the Sunsets
- 1972 - Status Quo
- 1973 - The Groundhogs
- 1973 - Hawkwind
- 1973 - Rod Stewart and the Faces
- 1973 - Wishbone Ash
- 1973 - Man / Deke Leonard Iceberg
- 1973 - Nazareth / Silverhead
- 1973 - The Sweet
- 1973 - Heavy Metal Kids / Uriah Heep
- 1973 - Queen / Mott the Hoople
- 1973 - Rory Gallagher
- 1973 - Lindisfarne / Claire Hamill
- 1973 - Status Quo
- 1974 - Hawkwind
- 1974 - Golden Earring / Alquin
- 1974 - Slade / Beckett
- 1974 - Fruupp
- 1974 - Rory Gallagher
- 1974 - Deep Purple
- 1974 - Steve Harley & Cockney Rebel
- 1974 - Status Quo / Snafu
- 1974 - Sparks
- 1974 - The Sensational Alex Harvey Band / Strider
- 1974 - Be-Bop Deluxe
- 1974 - Leo Sayer
- 1974 - Humble Pie
- 1974 - The Sensational Alex Harvey Band / Slack Alice
- 1974 - Van der Graaf Generator
- 1974 - Man / Badfinger
- 1974 - Tangerine Dream
- 1974 - Golden Earring / Lynyrd Skynyrd
- 1974 - The Sweet
- 1974 - Uriah Heep
- 1974 - Hawkwind / Dr. Feelgood
- 1975 - Barclay James Harvest / Julian Brooke
- 1975 - Pretty Things
- 1975 - The Sensational Alex Harvey Band
- 1975 - Dr. Feelgood
- 1976 - Black Sabbath
- 1977 - AC/DC
- 1977 - Thin Lizzy

== Kursaal Football Stadium ==
The Kursaal
- Interactive map of The Kursaal
- Location: Southend-on-Sea
- Capacity: 18,153
- Field size: 115 X 75 yards

Construction
- Opened: 1919
- Closed: 1934

Tenant
- Southend United F.C. (1919–1934)

=== Southend United ===
In 1919, David de Forest Morehouse became involved in trying to revive Southend United after World War I, and offered a one-year lease on the site within the park's ground, with an eventual purchase price of £9,500 agreed.

The ground was quickly created on the site, with a pitch of 115 yd by 75 yd set out with some rough banking and fence 9 ft from the touchline, and some dressing rooms in the south east corner. Its first match with West Ham United F.C. had to be postponed as the ground was not ready, but finally opened to the public on the 9 August 1919, with the first match taking place against Portsmouth F.C. on the 30 August 1919 in front of 5,400 people. Two temporary stands were added during the 1919–20 season, with the club claiming the ground would eventually hold 35,000, however The Sheffield Daily Telegraph called the ground "primitive". At the end of the season, United renewed their lease until 1924 and paid Humphries of London £5,000 to build a 1,500-capacity grandstand on the Arnold Avenue side of the ground. They also spent £500 on expanding the terracing, claiming the ground could hold 23,000.

In 1921, the amusement park built a waterchute behind the Woodgrange Drive end, and became a landmark for the ground, much in the vane of Fulham's Craven Cottage or Everton's Church . The lease was extended further in July 1924 and in 1926 the record attendance of 18,153 was achieved in a cup game against Nottingham Forest F.C.. The ground was further improved in 1928, when a new stand was built on the West Side by Flaxmans, and reportedly held 3,500. However, the club's management decided to move to the newly built Southend Stadium and paid £250 to break the lease in 1934. The final league game was against Norwich City F.C. on 28 April with an attendance of 4,000. A month later the West Stand was taken down and the Cyclone rollercoaster which had been purchased from the Brussels Exhibition was rebuilt on the former pitch in 1936.

=== Greyhound racing ===
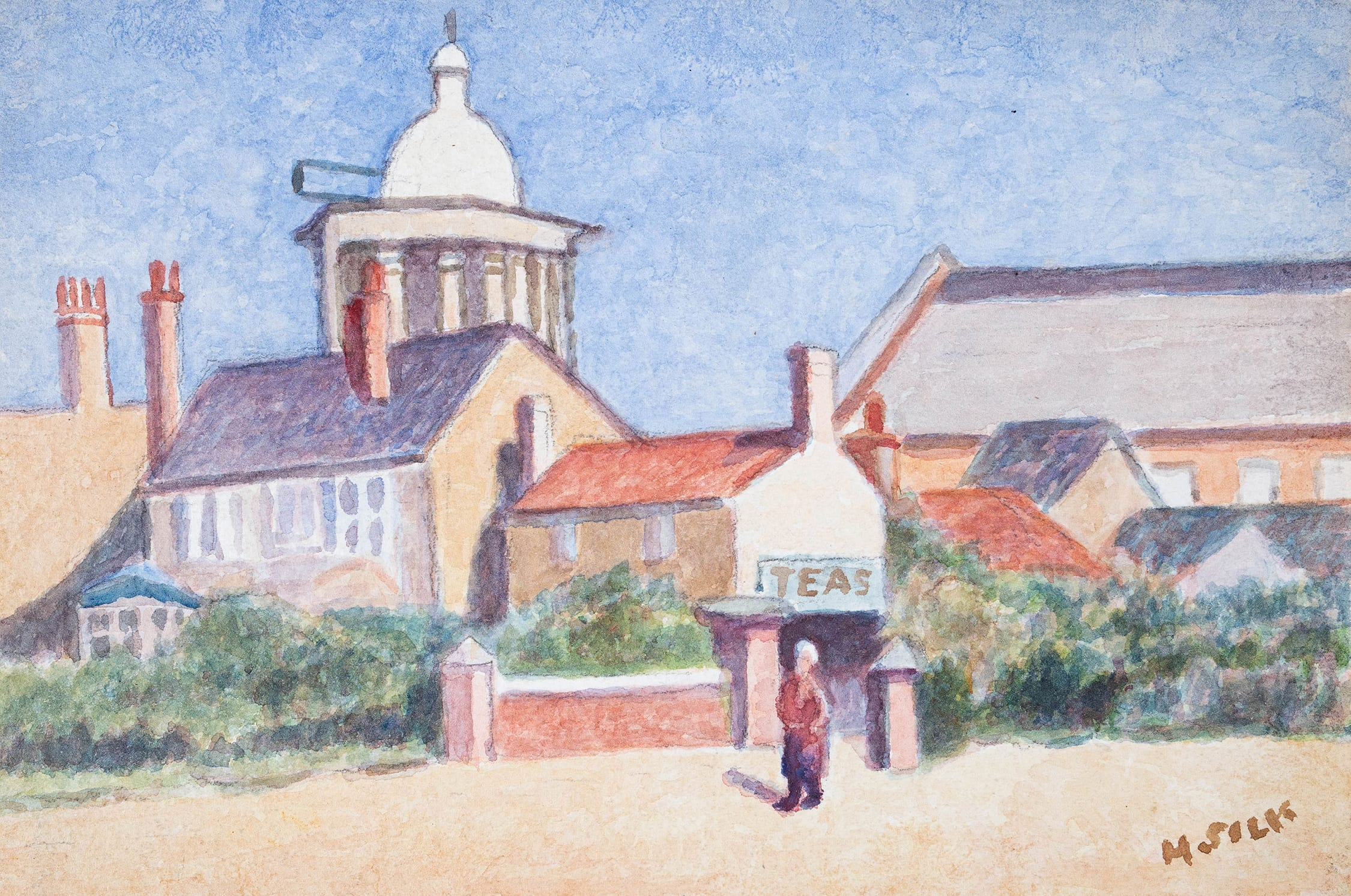
The Kursaal, Southend painted by Henry Silk, circa 1930

In 1927, two Scotsmen, Jimmy Shand and Tom Wilson approached Southend United F.C. and agreed on a deal to start greyhound racing on 27 July. The first meeting attracted 5,000 spectators and the first race was won by a greyhound called Self Starter at odds of 2–1 over 500 yards. The meeting was opened by the Deputy Mayor Alderman H A Dowsett and fifty track bookmakers attended. The racing was independent (not affiliated to the sports governing body the National Greyhound Racing Club). The pitch however was damaged in the corners as the track cut across it. In October new floodlights were added for the racing, but in a game against Bristol Rovers F.C. in November someone turned the lights on due to the murky conditions. They were quickly turned off as the Football Association did not allow floodlit matches. The damage to the pitch was concerning the Football Association, and in March 1928 they warned club's that they were considering taking action. However, it was the English Football League who ordered the club to cease racing at the ground in July 1928, after the club had four games postponed due to the pitch damage.

== See also ==
- The Kursaal Flyers, pop band, formed in Southend in 1973
