= Princess Dinubolu =

First Black contestant at a British beauty pageant

Princess Dinubolu's blue plaque

Princess Dinubolu (born 1888) was a Black British woman who claimed to be royalty from Senegal, although these claims are disputed. She is best known for becoming the first woman of color to enter a British beauty pageant in 1908.

== Early life ==
Very little is known for certain about Princess Dinubolu's childhood and ancestry. Some sources claim she was truly a princess, and others claim that she was fraudulent. It is also possible that she was a local Black British woman not from Senegal at all, but instead trying to earn money for the event's venue, the amusement park Kursaal.

Kursaal amusement park, the venue of the beauty pageant, c. 1901

== Beauty pageant ==
In 1908, Dinubolu sent a telegram to the owner of Kursaal asking for permission to enter the local beauty pageant. Dinubolu explained that she had already been refused at another pageant in Yarmouth on account of her race. Mr. Bacon, the Kursaal leader, denied her request.

In August 1908, Dinubolu entered the beauty pageant anyways in Southend, Essex. She was the first woman of color to enter a pageant in Britain, and the event caused an uproar.

== Legacy ==
Dinubolu was featured in the 2018 Forgotten Black Essex art exhibit by Elsa James. In March 2024, a blue plaque was installed at Southend-on-Sea's Victoria Station in honor of Princess Dinubolu. In 2024, playwright Anne Odeke's Princess Essex was a fictionalized account of Dinubolu's life.
