= Jane Packer =

British florist (1959–2011)

- Born: 22 September 1959
- Died: 9 November 2011 (aged 52); London
- Occupation: florist
- Known for: Revolutionising the florist industry in the UK

Jane Packer (1959–2011) was a British florist.

== Life ==
Jane Packer was born on 22 September 1959 in Chadwell St Mary in Essex. She worked as a florist and graduated from Southwark College. In 1986, she designed the bouquet for the wedding of Sarah Ferguson, and Prince Andrew, Duke of York. In 1989, she started the Jane Packer Flower School.

From 1993 to 1997, she won a Royal Horticultural Society gold medal at the Hampton Court Palace Flower Show.

Packer was awarded the Prince Philip Medal for outstanding achievements in her career in 2005.

She died at the Hospital of St John and St Elizabeth, on 9 November 2011.

== Family ==
In 1990, she married Gary Alan Wallis; they had one son and one daughter.

== Works ==
- Celebrating with Flowers (1987)
- Flowers for All Seasons (1989)
- New Flower Arranging (1993)
- Complete Guide (1995)
- Living With Flowers (1996)
- Fast Flowers (1998)
- Flowers, Design, Philosophy (2000)
- World Flowers (2003)
- Colour (2007)
- Flower Course (2008)
- At Home With Flowers (2011)
