= Fossetts Farm Stadium =

Former proposed football stadium in Essex, England

- Interactive map of Fossetts Farm Stadium
- Location: Southend-on-Sea, Essex, England
- Coordinates: 51.5587°N 0.7212°E
- Owner: Southend United
- Operator: Southend United
- Capacity: c. 17,000

Construction
- Cost: £80 million
- Architect: Populous (formerly HOK Sport)

Tenant
- Southend United F.C.

Website
- fossetts.co.uk

The Fossetts Farm Stadium was a proposed football stadium in Southend-on-Sea, Essex, England for Southend United, replacing Roots Hall Stadium in urban Prittlewell. Initial proposals for the new stadium emerged in 1998; planning permission was applied for, and later confirmed by Southend Council, in 2008. At that time the scheme, championed by club chairman and property developer Ron Martin, depended entirely on financing from a proposed adjacent retail and leisure development, which failed to happen.

In 2020, a new deal was agreed, based instead on delivery of 1,300 new homes, split between the Fossetts Farm site (c. 800) and Roots Hall (c. 500). However, council planning approval for revised plans including a 16,226-seat stadium had still not been given in August 2023. In September 2023, a consortium bidding to buy Southend United suggested the club might remain at Roots Hall due to the "non-viability" of the stadium project.

After the sale of the club to the consortium was confirmed on 3 October 2023, the stadium plan was abandoned. Concerns about the viability of the housing-only development at Fossetts Farm continued, delaying completion of the club's sale until July 2024, by which time the number of homes had been reduced to no more than 850. In December 2024, construction of 805 family homes was expected to start in 2026.

== History ==
=== Financial preparation (1998-1999) ===
Billericay-based property development company Martin Dawn PLC and Delancey Estates, together forming South Eastern Leisure (SEL), took control of Southend United in November 1998. Ron Martin said his company was "Committed to a successful football club on and off the field, both of which can be enhanced by the future possibility of a new stadium and improved facilities for all". SEL bought the club and its centrally located Roots Hall ground for £4m from then chairman Vic Jobson, who at the time owned 55% of the issued share capital of the club. Jobson had previously sold part of the ground's South Bank for housing, and SEL's plan was to continue the redevelopment and move the club to a proposed 16,000-seat stadium in a leisure redevelopment in the northern part of Southend.

In March 1999 Southend United's Roots Hall ground was sold for £4 million to Martin Dawn subsidiary Roots Hall Limited to clear a £3.87 million debt; the club would lease back the ground at an annual rent of £400,000. John Main had replaced Jobson as Southend United chairman, and said: "There is no question of Roots Hall being bulldozed to the ground before we have relocated to a new stadium – this club will not be homeless." But disgruntled club shareholders demanded the resignations of several board members at an EGM called to rubber-stamp the sale, claiming that they should stand down for allowing the club to slip so dangerously into the red and forcing the sale of the club's only real asset. "These board members should be made to resign after displaying their utter incompetence by allowing the company to trade in an insolvent situation," exclaimed one annoyed shareholder.

In September 1999 Southend United said plans for a new multimillion-pound stadium would be presented to council chiefs within weeks with chairman John Main confident that the club would be given permission to start construction early in the new millennium. "The council have been very supportive and we hope that the planning application passes through successfully", said Main. "If it does we can look forward to moving into a new state-of-the-art home within the next few years."

=== Stadium planning application and setbacks (2000-2002) ===
Plans for the new 15,000-seat stadium were put on hold in February 2000 after it was discovered that an ancient 14-acre (57,000 m^{2}) Bronze Age burial ground entered onto the planned site. By March 2000 supporters frustration grew as the club continued to fail to meet promised planning application submission dates. The Southend United Supporters Club Trust (SUSCT) observed that the club was running out of time. "We're no nearer to getting a new home now than we were 12 months ago, which is very worrying because we are running out of time fast," said chairman Trevor Bashford. Members of Southend Council were equally eager to see some progress. In late May 2000 Council chief executive George Krawiec threw his weight behind the proposals but admitted that he would like to see some progress made on the planning front. "We await both eagerly and anxiously Southend United's planning application so we can look at it properly within the correct guidelines," said Krawiec.

Plans for a £12.5 million 16,000-seat stadium on the Fossets Farm site were submitted in July 2000, but the proposal fell through almost immediately after a rival property development company revealed that it actually owned much of the site.

Two months later, in September 2000, Southend United came to the brink of extinction after a £400,000 demand from the Inland Revenue went unpaid, amid boardroom turmoil. Main had been uneasy about the club having to pay £400,000 annual rent to its new owners, and about Ron Martin's motives ("How can he argue for the club, particularly against SEL, if he jointly owns SEL and his main interest is in making money from the property deal?"). Main was ousted as a condition of a £1.5m investment by Delancy Estates, and replaced by Martin.

Speaking to shareholders at the club's December 2000 AGM, Ron Martin said that the proposal for a 16,000 capacity ground should go before the planning committee on 7 February 2001 and that he was "confident" that both the football club and local council were on the same wavelength.

However, the council decided to defer the decision for a further three months. Fans set up an action group 'Save Our Southend' to prevent their club from becoming homeless or even extinct. "We want our football team's future to be protected in the borough of Southend," said SOS spokesman Trevor Bashford. Even former boss David Webb voiced his concerns: "I'm still very sceptical about what will happen to the club if the stadium doesn't come off."

In June 2001 the club pulled out of a planning meeting set to make a decision on the Fossetts Farm proposal, citing that it "needed more time to assess the content of its project". SEL UK, the club's joint owner, later declared that it wanted to sell the club: "The directors are currently seeking to sell the company's interest in Southend United" said the auditors' report. Ron Martin said the joint owners of Martin Dawn and Delancey were not about to cut and run: "The position is quite clear – Martin Dawn and Delancey are only interested in the longevity of Southend United." In August 2001, former chairman John Main warned fans that the proposal was not "financially viable" and that "there will be no stadium at Fossetts Farm and the future of the football club remains at Roots Hall."

In September 2001 it was claimed that Southend United could remain at Roots Hall after a deal was proposed between property developers Lansbury and Delancey. Negotiations continued into 2002, with a deal announced in December 2002, allowing the club to remain at Roots Hall for three years while plans for Fossetts Farm were developed.

=== Stadium and leisure/retail plans (2006-2011) ===
In March 2006, Martin bought out Delancy's shareholding in Southend United, and planned a new Council submission about a combined 17,000-seat stadium, retail and leisure development at Fossett's Farm. On 3 August 2006 local media reported that work was to start in 2007 on a £25 million 22,000 super-stadium. Martin stated that "plans are at an advanced stage now" and added that they would be submitted in late September 2006 after which there will be a 16-week public consultation. The new ground has been designed by Populous, formerly known as HOK Sport.

In January 2007, Southend Borough Council gave planning permission for a new 22,000-seater stadium at Fossetts Farm, with Rochford District Council following suit 24 hours later. On 6 March 2008, permission to develop Fossetts Farm was given by the government.

In November 2011, two contractors - Bowmer + Kirkland and McLaren Construction - were reported to be competing for the £30m, 14,000-seat stadium construction contract, with the development part-funded by retailer Sainsbury's and now including social housing.

=== Residential-led stadium scheme (2020–2023) ===
However, it took a further nine years before firm plans emerged for the development, with a switch from retail and leisure to residential provision; in April 2020, a deal was agreed between Southend United, the borough council and social housing provider Citizen Housing. Established in 2018, Citizen Housing is a 50/50 joint venture between Lenrose Housing and Allied Commercial Exporters, the UK investment vehicle of property tycoons, the Dellal family; it is fronted by Ron Martin's son, Jack Martin.

More than 1,300 homes, including 400 affordable ones, were to be built in the area around the stadium at Fossetts Farm; plans for the retail area had been axed. The local authority stood to gain long-term income from managing 500 homes on the current Roots Hall site and 800 surrounding the new stadium.

The development was expected to proceed despite Southend United's May 2021 relegation from the Football League. In September 2021, a vote on plans for the scheme by the council's development control committee was reported to be imminent. The plans were approved in October 2021, subject to Government approval anticipated in early 2022; the 22,000-capacity stadium was to incorporate a 107-bed hotel and high-rise residential blocks of 182 homes on two corners.

Work started on the £2million groundworks to develop the new training ground pitches and players' car parking in July 2022.

In September 2022, after the club had been unable to get a hotel operator on board, plans to build a hotel at the proposed new stadium were dropped in favour of 42 additional homes, taking the total to 224 homes. A revised planning application also outlined plans to lower the stadium capacity to 16,226. In February 2023, applications for the additional homes and smaller stadium were both still to be decided by Southend Council as information had not been provided by the club. Scaled-back plans for the ground were eventually submitted to the council in late March 2023.

==== Southend United put up for sale ====
Also in March 2023, the club began exploring the sale of the club or bringing in new investment partners. With Martin set to own any stadium at Fossetts Farm, the Shrimpers Trust urged Southend Council to use its planning powers to ensure the stadium remained in the club's ownership, but councillors ruled out implementing the fans' proposals.

On 17 July 2023, Martin said he would sell his stake in the club for £1, but wanted £4.5m for Roots Hall. In late July 2023, he told protesting fans—who he blamed for deterring potential bidders—that nobody had yet made him an offer on his terms.

In August 2023, Thames Plaza, a partner in the Fossetts Farm development with Roots Hall Limited (both firms are owned by the Martin family), bought an "unused playing field" and carpark adjacent to the Fossetts Farm site from Loxford Schools Trust, manager of the city's Cecil Jones Academy in Eastern Avenue, for £1.167M.

==== "Non-viability" of Fossets Farm stadium ====
On 20 September 2023, a statement was released by a consortium which was looking to buy the club. Acknowledging the complexity of any deal, the consortium said it had made two bids to Ron Martin, but neither had been accepted. Details of the bids were not revealed but the statement highlighted "the non-viability of a new stadium at Fossetts Farm" and proposed instead to take ownership of, retain and upgrade Roots Hall as the club's stadium. It said this would release Martin to develop Fossetts Farm without a new stadium requirement, but it expected him to contribute funds back towards the redevelopment of Roots Hall.

On 3 October 2023, the club confirmed that they had reached an agreement for the sale of the club to a consortium led by Australian businessman Justin Rees, with a formal takeover and completion date of 1 November 2023. Details of the rescue deal were yet to be finalised, but reports suggested the club would remain at Roots Hall, with the 500 homes once planned for the site transferred to Fossetts Farm, a move agreed by Southend's council in early November.

=== Residential-only development (2024–present) ===
On 5 December, the consortium said due diligence had raised important issues which had required further time to resolve, and some legal and procedural work remained. The exact completion date would be confirmed "once it is locked in". On 23 December 2023, Martin and the Rees consortium exchanged contracts for the sale of the club; the deal remained conditional upon Southend Council's approval of certain property transactions and club ownership was expected to be formally transferred in early 2024. In March 2024, Southend CEO Tom Lawrence said final completion of the club's takeover could still be a couple of months away, being dependent upon a council review of the housing shift to Fossets Farm, though it later emerged that obtaining the consent of Ron and son Jack Martin's finance partner (CBRE) was also delaying matters.

In early May 2024, the council's due diligence over plans for the housing at Fossetts Farm continued, while CBRE had yet to consent to the payment structure for the Roots Hall refurbishment. At a winding-up petition hearing on 15 May, the consortium and Martin sought a six-week adjournment. The club was given six weeks to settle with creditors or face liquidation. On 7 June 2024, the consortium ("Custodians of Southend United", COSU) said Southend United could go out of business as a property element of the contract might not be signed ahead of 26 June winding-up hearing date. Southend Council and the Martins were in renewed negotiations about the deal. The newly elected council leader Daniel Cowan blamed the previous administration for assurances that "fell outside of normal practice and were simply not achievable"; the Fossetts Farm housing developer (Citizen Housing) was said to be modelling a new proposal that would help safeguard the council from judicial review. On 14 June 2024, Cowan confirmed the proposed development of up to 1,300 homes had failed the council's due diligence process. Citizen Housing was given until 21 June 2024 to respond to new council proposals.

On 19 July 2024, the COSU consortium completed its takeover of Southend United. The Fossetts Farm development remained subject to due diligence by the city council. Earlier, on 4 July 2024, the planned number of homes at Fossetts Farm had been cut by 500. Plans for up to 1,300 homes in apartment blocks seven to eight storeys high were scrapped. The plans proposed 800 to 850 homes in buildings no higher than four storeys, leased by Ron Martin to Southend Council under a build-to-rent finance scheme. The Fossets Farm plans were discussed and approved by the council in 21 December 2024, though construction of 805 family homes was unlikely to start before 2026. In March 2025, the council confirmed funders had backed amended proposals; a planning application for about 805 homes would be submitted by Thames Plaza, in partnership with the local authority, with up to £12m to go towards refurbishment and regeneration of the Roots Hall stadium. The council considered detailed plans for the first phase of the housing development in July 2025. In February 2026, Southend councillors urged the city council to accelerate its decision on the Fossets Farm planning application, which had yet to appear before the council's planning committee.
