= Roy Clare =

British Royal Navy Rear Admiral (born 1950)

Rear Admiral Roy Clare CBE DL
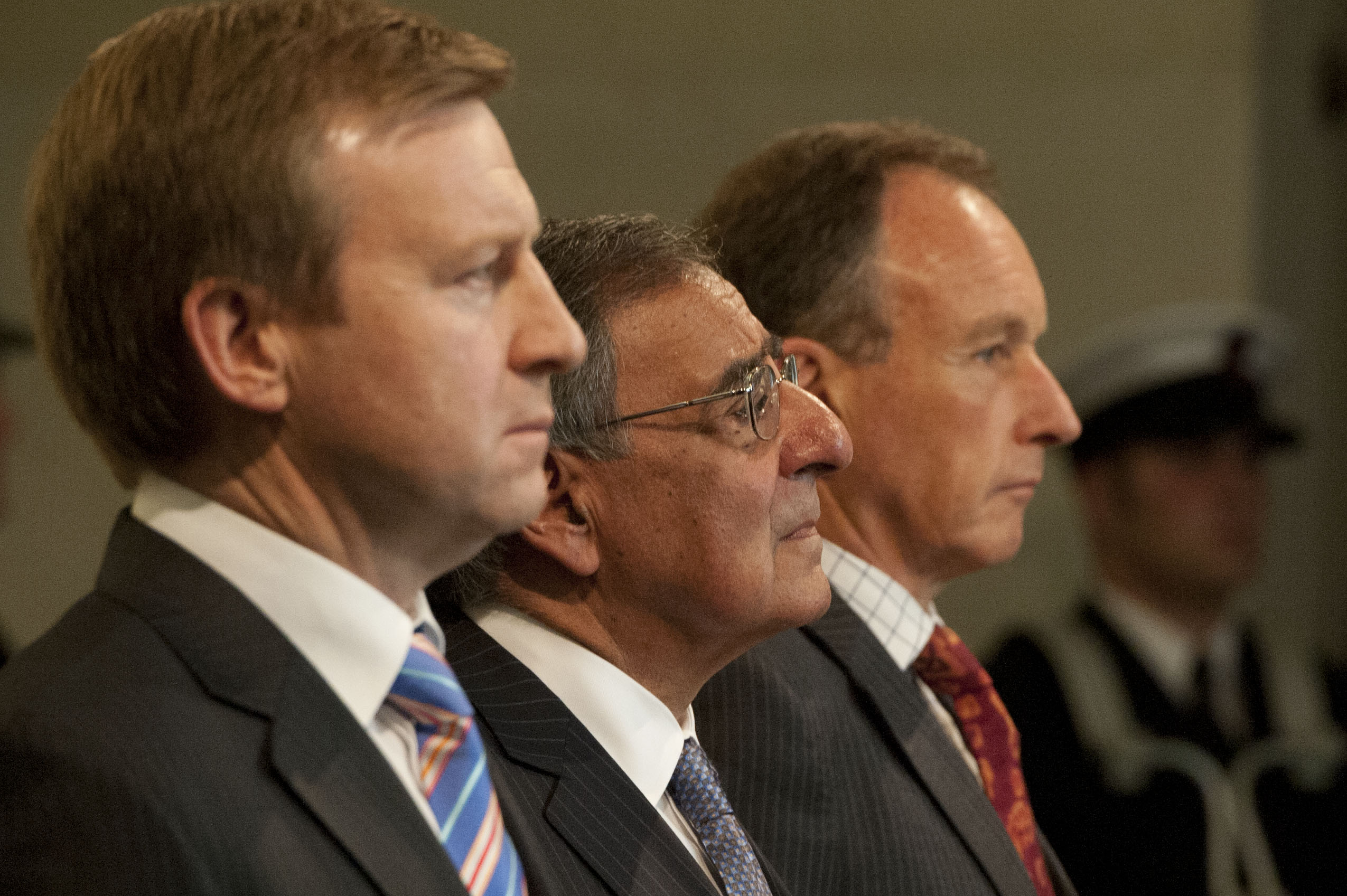
- Clare (right) with Leon E. Panetta (centre) and Jonathan Coleman (left), in 2012
- Born: 30 September 1950 (age 76); Hammersmith, London
- Military career
- Allegiance: United Kingdom
- Branch: Royal Navy
- Service years: 1966–2000
- Rank: Rear Admiral
- Commands: Britannia Royal Naval College; HMS Invincible; Third Destroyer Squadron; HMS York; HMS Birmingham; HMS Bronington
- Awards: Commander of the Order of the British Empire

Rear Admiral Roy Alexander George Clare, CBE, DL (born 30 September 1950) was a Flag Officer in the Royal Navy, Chair of the Chelmsford Cultural Development Trust, trustee of digital inclusion charity Good Things Foundation and of the Heritage Alliance.

From April 2011 until 2016, he was director of the Auckland War Memorial Museum in New Zealand.

== Early life and naval career ==
Clare was born in Hammersmith, London, on 30 September 1950. He moved with his family from London to Cape Town, South Africa, where he attended St George's Grammar School.

Clare joined the Royal Navy as a seaman at HMS Ganges in 1966, aged 15, and rose to become a rear admiral in 1999, serving in a NATO appointment before leaving the service voluntarily in 2000 to take up the role of Director of the National Maritime Museum, Greenwich.

During his naval career he studied at the Britannia Royal Naval College, Dartmouth (1972), the Royal Naval Staff College, Greenwich, and the Royal College of Defence Studies (1993). He was Military Assistant to the Minister of State for the Armed Forces (1989–91) and the Assistant Director of Navy Plans (Ships) (1993–96).

Clare served at sea in Eastbourne, Decoy, Ashanti, Diomede, Juno and Glamorgan. His commands included the minehunter Bronington (Note: Clare was the first lieutenant from 1975 to 1977 with the then Prince of Wales, Later Charles III as the captain, and then commanded Bronington from 1980 to 1981.) the destroyers Birmingham (1987–89) and York (1991–92), and the aircraft carrier Invincible (1996–97). He was captain of the Third Destroyer Squadron in 1991–92 and in 1998–99 was commodore of the Britannia Royal Naval College, where he was responsible for preparing new entrant officers for their careers. While Commodore at the college he founded the Britannia Museum, opening the college to public visitors for the first time.

Clare was a trustee of HMS Bronington between 1989 and 1999, after she was decommissioned from the Royal Navy. He was vice-president of the Bronington Trust in 1999 until the Trust ceased to exist in 2002. He edited the book HMS Bronington: A Tribute to One of Britain's Last Wooden Walls And a Celebration of The Ton Class, which was published in 1996.

== Museums career ==
Clare was director of the National Maritime Museum between 2000 and 2007, during which time he oversaw a series of exhibitions, including Elizabeth, Skin Deep and Nelson & Napoleon. He instigated SeaBritain 2005, a partnership with Visit Britain and sixty other organisations to commemorate the bicentenary of Admiral Nelson's victory in the Battle of Trafalgar.

Clare led a re-structuring of collections management, including a partnership project with Chatham Historic Dockyard to display and store models of ships. He initiated the £16 million Time and Space project to restore buildings at the Royal Observatory, which included the building of the Peter Harrison Planetarium. The refurbished Royal Observatory was opened by Queen Elizabeth II in May 2007.

During this time Clare was Director of Queens House, the Caird Library and the Royal Observatory, Greenwich. From 2001 to 2007 he was chairman of a leadership working-group established by the National Museum Directors' Council. He was a member of a maritime policy think-tank called the Greenwich Forum. Between 2005 and 2007 he was a member of the board of Creative and Cultural Skills (a Sector Skills Council for museums) and between 2009 and 2011 he was a member of the board of the Qualifications and Curriculum Development Agency.

From 2007 Clare was chief executive of the Museums, Libraries and Archives Council (MLA), of which he had been a board member during the previous year. The organisation was subsequently merged within Arts Council England. During that period Clare was also chairman of Living Places, a grouping of UK cultural agencies including Arts Council England, the Commission for Architecture and the Built Environment (CABE), English Heritage, the Museums, Libraries and Archives Council and Sport England.

In April 2011, Clare was appointed director of the Auckland War Memorial Museum in New Zealand, replacing interim director Sir Don McKinnon.

In 2014 Clare was elected to the Board of Museums Aotearoa (the association for New Zealand's museums). He was Chair of Museums Aotearoa from May 2015 until May 2016.

== Recognition ==
Clare was appointed a Commander of the Order of the British Empire in 2007 "for services to museums", and in the same year he received an honorary doctorate from the University of Greenwich.

In 2018 Clare was appointed a Deputy Lieutenant Deputy Lieutenant of Essex. He was awarded the Queen's Silver Jubilee Medal in 1977 and also the General Service Medal in 1977 and in 1989. He was made a Freeman of the City of London in 2001, of the Worshipful Company of Shipwrights in 2002 and of the Worshipful Company of Clockmakers in 2004. In 2001 he became a Companion of the Chartered Management Institute; and he was a Fellow of the Royal Institute of Navigation between 2005 and 2008.

== Personal life ==
Clare was chief mate of the Royal Navy yacht Adventure in the first Whitbread Round the World Race. He and his wife Sarah (an Anglican Priest) have a son and two daughters and two granddaughters. Their home is in Essex on the Blackwater Estuary where they keep a sailing boat. He is a naval member of the Royal Yacht Squadron.
