= Julia Abel Smith =

British historian

Julia Abel Smith DL

High Sheriff of Essex
- In office 2013–2014
- Preceded by: Christopher Palmer-Tomkinson
- Succeeded by: Nicholas Charrington

Personal details
- Spouse: Charles Abel Smith
- Education: Selwyn College, Cambridge
- Occupation: Historian; historical preservationist

Julia Mary Seton Abel Smith DL is a British historian and historical preservationist. She has authored the books Pavilions in Peril (1988) and Forbidden Wife (2020), the latter of which is about the relationship and eventual marriage of Lady Augusta Murray and Prince Augustus Frederick, Duke of Sussex. She also served as High Sheriff of Essex (2013–2014).

== Biography ==
Julia Wolton was born in 1959 or 1960. She was educated at Selwyn College, Cambridge, obtaining a degree in Art History. She married Charles Abel Smith, a descendant of the Smith banking family. (Note: Wilfrid Abel Smith's father Ralph Richard Abel Smith was a male-line great-grandson of Abel Smith MP.)

She worked for Save Britain's Heritage and as a historical researcher for the Landmark Trust. In 1987, she wrote a report on the deteriorating state of British garden buildings for Save Britain's Heritage, titled Pavilion in Peril; the same and next year, she and the report were cited in several news articles on the condition of follies, including in the New York Times. She also has a career of creating catalogues of art, including a cataloguing project of sculptures in public ownership within Bedfordshire, Essex, and Hertfordshire and Art UK's catalogues of paintings located at the University of Cambridge or in public ownership within Essex.

In February 2020, Abel Smith published Forbidden Wife, a historical book about the relationship and eventual marriage of Lady Augusta Murray and Prince Augustus Frederick, Duke of Sussex. She had come up with the idea after learning about Murray during her research on the Dunmore Pineapple and being inspired by the obscure nature of Murray's history. In her review of The Forbidden Wife for Tatler, Francesca Carington described Abel Smith as "a wonderful storyteller", noting that "her descriptions of late-eighteenth-century Virginia, Rome and London are almost novel-like in colour and detail". She also wrote Augusta's Oxford Dictionary of National Biography article.

She was appointed Deputy Lieutenant of Essex on 17 September 2007. She was appointed High Sheriff of Essex in 2013, serving until 2014. She also serves as a governor of Felsted School.

As of 2013, she lived in Little Leighs. She also practices cycling as a hobby, having reportedly trained for a long ride from London to Paris.
