= 2018–19 Milton Keynes Dons F.C. season =

Milton Keynes Dons
2018–19 season
- Chairman: Pete Winkelman
- Manager: Paul Tisdale
- Stadium: Stadium MK
- League Two: 3rd (promoted to EFL League One)
- FA Cup: First round
- EFL Cup: Second round
- EFL Trophy: Group stage
- Top goalscorer: League: Kieran Agard (20); All: Kieran Agard (22)
- Highest home attendance: 20,718 (vs Mansfield Town); 4 May 2019, League Two
- Lowest home attendance: 1,018 (vs Brighton & Hove Albion U21s); 13 November 2018, EFL Trophy Group H
- Average home league attendance: 8,224
- Biggest win: 6–0 (vs Cambridge United); 1 January 2019, League Two
- Biggest defeat: 3–0 (vs Luton Town); 9 October 2018, EFL Trophy Group H 3–0 (vs AFC Bournemouth); 28 August 2018, EFL Cup R2
Home colours	Away colours	Third colours

The 2018–19 season was Milton Keynes Dons' 15th season in their existence, and the club's first season back in League Two following relegation from League One at the end of the 2017–18 season. Along with competing in League Two, the club also competed in the FA Cup, EFL Cup and EFL Trophy.

The season covers the period from 1 July 2018 to 30 June 2019.

== Competitions ==
=== League Two ===
Final table

Pos	Team	Pld	W	D	L	GF	GA	GD	Pts
1	Lincoln City (C,P)	46	23	16	7	73	43	+30	85
2	Bury (P)	46	22	13	11	82	56	+26	79
3	Milton Keynes Dons (P)	46	23	10	13	71	49	+22	79
4	Mansfield Town	46	20	16	10	69	41	+28	76
5	Forest Green Rovers	46	20	14	12	68	47	+21	74

Source: Sky Sports

Matches

Win	Draw	Loss

Date	Opponent	Venue	Result	Scorers	Attendance	Ref
4 August 2018 – 15:00	Oldham Athletic	Away	2–1	Agard, Harley	4,764	
11 August 2018 – 15:00	Bury	Home	1–0	Cissé	6,897	
18 August 2018 – 15:00	Crewe Alexandra	Away	0–0		3,505	
21 August 2018 – 19:45	Grimsby Town	Home	1–1	Simpson	6,800	
25 August 2018 – 15:00	Exeter City	Home	1–0	Agard	7,672	
1 September 2018 – 15:00	Swindon Town	Away	1–1	Walsh	6,620	
15 September 2018 – 15:00	Forest Green Rovers	Home	1–1	Aneke	6,638	
22 September 2018 – 15:00	Lincoln City	Away	1–2	Healey	9,322	
25 September 2018 – 19:45	Yeovil Town	Away	1–1	Agard	2,634	
29 September 2018 – 15:00	Tranmere Rovers	Home	1–1	Aneke	7,048	
2 October 2018 – 19:45	Port Vale	Away	2–0	Aneke, Agard	3,399	
6 October 2018 – 15:00	Cheltenham Town	Home	3–0	Aneke, Healey, Simpson	6,503	
13 October 2018 – 15:00	Cambridge United	Away	1–0	Aneke	5,106	
20 October 2018 – 15:00	Northampton Town	Home	1–0	Agard	9,618	
23 October 2018 – 19:45	Notts County	Home	2–1	Aneke, Healey	6,501	
27 October 2018 – 15:00	Mansfield Town	Away	1–1	Houghton	4,329	
3 November 2018 – 15:00	Crawley Town	Away	4–0	Healey (2), Agard, Aneke	2,667	
17 November 2018 – 15:00	Macclesfield Town	Home	2–0	Aneke, Agard	7,087	
24 November 2018 – 15:00	Stevenage	Away	2–3	Healey, Agard	3,263	
27 November 2018 – 19:45	Morecambe	Home	2–0	Gilbey (2)	5,726	
8 December 2018 – 19:45	Carlisle United	Home	2–0	Houghton, Agard	5,849	
22 December 2018 – 15:00	Colchester United	Home	0–1		7,765	
26 December 2018 – 15:00	Cheltenham Town	Away	1–3	Aneke	3,226	
29 December 2018 – 15:00	Northampton Town	Away	2–2	Gilbey, Aneke	6,963	
1 January 2019 – 15:00	Cambridge United	Home	6–0	Healey (2), Agard (2), Aneke, Sow	8,128	
12 January 2019 – 15:00	Bury	Away	3–4	Moore-Taylor, Lewington, Stokes (o.g.)	4,072	
19 January 2019 – 15:00	Crewe Alexandra	Home	0–1		8,347	
26 January 2019 – 15:00	Grimsby Town	Away	0–1		3,862	
29 January 2019 – 19:45	Oldham Athletic	Home	2–1	Aneke, Agard	5,950	
2 February 2019 – 15:00	Exeter City	Away	1–3	Walsh	5,766	
9 February 2019 – 15:00	Swindon Town	Home	2–3	Hesketh, Agard	7,864	
12 February 2019 – 19:45	Newport County	Away	1–0	Aneke	2,860	
16 February 2019 – 15:00	Carlisle United	Away	3–2	McGrandles, Hesketh, Agard	10,459	
23 February 2019 – 15:00	Newport County	Home	2–0	Cissé, Aneke	6,984	
2 March 2019 – 15:00	Crawley Town	Home	1–0	Agard	6,889	
9 March 2019 – 15:00	Macclesfield Town	Away	3–1	Brittain, Wheeler, Agard	2,017	
12 March 2019 – 19:45	Morecambe	Away	2–4	Agard (2)	1,460	
16 March 2019 – 15:00	Stevenage	Home	1–1	Aneke	7,365	
23 March 2019 – 15:00	Yeovil Town	Home	2–0	Harley, Aneke	7,593	
30 March 2019 – 15:00	Forest Green Rovers	Away	2–1	Agard, Martin	3,220	
6 April 2019 – 15:00	Lincoln City	Home	0–2		15,851	
13 April 2019 – 15:00	Tranmere Rovers	Away	1–2	Agard	8,357	
19 April 2019 – 15:00	Notts County	Away	2–1	Wheeler, Aneke	7,130	
22 April 2019 – 15:00	Port Vale	Home	1–1	Wheeler	8,386	
27 April 2019 – 15:00	Colchester United	Away	0–2		5,000	
4 May 2019 – 15:00	Mansfield Town	Home	1–0	Wheeler	20,718	

=== FA Cup ===
Win	Draw	Loss

Date	Round	Opponent	Venue	Result	Scorers	Attendance	Ref
10 November 2018 – 15:00	First round	Grimsby Town	Away	1–3	Agard	1,991	

=== EFL Cup ===
Win	Draw	Loss

Date	Round	Opponent	Venue	Result	Scorers	Attendance	Ref
14 August 2018 – 19:45	First round	Charlton Athletic	Away	3–0	Asonganyi, Watson, Cummings (o.g.)	3,052	
28 August 2018 – 19:45	Second round	AFC Bournemouth	Away	0–3		9,747	

=== EFL Trophy ===
Southern Group H Table

Pos	Div	Team	Pld	W	PW	PL	L	GF	GA	GD	Pts	Qualification
1	L1	Luton Town (Q)	3	2	0	0	1	6	3	+3	6	Second round
2	L1	Peterborough United (Q)	3	1	0	2	0	7	6	+1	5	Second round
3	ACA	Brighton & Hove Albion U21 (E)	3	1	1	0	1	6	6	0	5	
4	L2	Milton Keynes Dons (E)	3	0	1	0	2	5	9	−4	2	

Matches

Win	Draw	Loss

Date	Round	Opponent	Venue	Result	Scorers	Attendance	Ref
4 September 2018 – 19:45	Group stage	Peterborough United	Home	3–3 (Note: After 90 minutes. Milton Keynes Dons gained an extra point with a 6–5 win on penalties.)	Aneke (2), Healey	2,404	
9 October 2018 – 19:45	Group stage	Luton Town	Away	0–3		875	
13 November 2018 – 19:45	Group stage	Brighton & Hove Albion U21	Home	2–3	Agard, Hancox	1,018	

== Squad ==
Note: Players' ages as of the club's opening fixture of the 2018–19 season.

#	Name	Nationality	Position	Date of birth (age)	Signed from	Signed in	Transfer fee
Goalkeepers
1	Lee Nicholls	(England)	GK	5 October 1992 (aged 25)	Free agent	2016	Free
22	Stuart Moore	(England)	GK	8 September 1994 (aged 23)	Free agent	2018	Free
Defenders
2	George Williams	(England)	RB	14 April 1993 (aged 25)	(England) Barnsley	2016	Free
3	Dean Lewington	(England)	LB	18 May 1984 (aged 34)	(England) Wimbledon	2004	Free
4	Joe Walsh	(Wales)	CB	13 May 1992 (aged 26)	(England) Crawley Town	2015	Undisclosed
5	Mathieu Baudry	(France)	CB	24 February 1988 (aged 30)	Free agent	2018	Free
12	Mitch Hancox	(England)	LB	9 November 1993 (aged 24)	(England) Macclesfield Town	2018	Free
15	Jordan Moore-Taylor	(England)	CB	24 January 1994 (aged 24)	(England) Exeter City	2018	Free
16	Russell Martin	(Scotland)	CB	4 January 1986 (aged 32)	Free agent	2019	Free
25	Callum Brittain	(England)	RB	12 March 1998 (aged 20)	Academy	2016	Trainee
26	Baily Cargill	(England)	CB	5 July 1995 (aged 23)	Free agent	2018	Free
28	Oran Jackson	(England)	CB	16 October 1998 (aged 19)	Academy	2016	Trainee
31	Finn Tapp	(England)	CB	9 November 1999 (aged 18)	Academy	2016	Trainee
Midfielders
6	Ousseynou Cissé	(Mali)	DM	7 April 1991 (aged 27)	(France) Tours	2017	Free
7	Ryan Watson	(England)	AM	7 July 1993 (aged 25)	(England) Barnet	2018	Free
8	Alex Gilbey	(England)	AM	9 December 1994 (aged 23)	(England) Wigan Athletic	2017	Undisclosed
11	Jake Hesketh	(England)	AM	27 March 1996 (aged 22)	(England) Southampton	2019	Loan
18	Conor McGrandles	(Scotland)	CM	21 October 1999 (aged 18)	(England) Norwich City	2017	Free
20	Lawson D'Ath	(England)	CM	24 December 1992 (aged 25)	(England) Luton Town	2018	Free
20	David Wheeler	(England)	RM	4 October 1990 (aged 27)	(England) Queens Park Rangers	2019	Loan
24	Jordan Houghton	(England)	DM	5 November 1995 (aged 22)	Free agent	2018	Free
29	David Kasumu	(Nigeria)	CM	5 October 1999 (aged 18)	Academy	2017	Trainee
33	Ryan Harley	(England)	AM	22 January 1985 (aged 33)	(England) Exeter City	2018	Free
38	Charlie Pattison	(England)	AM	28 December 2000 (aged 17)	Academy	2019	Trainee
Forwards
10	Chuks Aneke	(England)	CF	3 July 1993 (aged 25)	(Belgium) Zulte Waregem	2016	Free
14	Kieran Agard	(England)	CF	10 October 1989 (aged 28)	(England) Bristol City	2016	Undisclosed
19	Robbie Simpson	(England)	CF	15 March 1985 (aged 33)	Free agent	2018	Free
34	Stephen Walker	(England)	CF	11 October 2000 (aged 17)	(England) Middlesbrough	2018	Loan
37	Dylan Asonganyi	(England)	CF	10 October 2000 (aged 17)	Academy	2017	Trainee
Out on loan
27	Brandon Thomas-Asante	(Ghana)	LW	29 December 1998 (aged 19)	Academy	2016	Trainee
27	Sam Nombe	(England)	CF	22 October 1998 (aged 19)	Academy	2017	Trainee
30	Liam Sole	(England)	RW	21 December 1999 (aged 18)	Academy	2018	Trainee
Left club during season
9	Osman Sow	(Sweden)	CF	22 April 1990 (aged 28)	Free agent	2017	Free
11	Peter Pawlett	(Scotland)	LW	3 February 1991 (aged 27)	(Scotland) Aberdeen	2017	Free
12	Wieger Sietsma	(Netherlands)	GK	11 July 1995 (aged 23)	Free agent	2017	Free
21	Aidan Nesbitt	(Scotland)	AM	5 February 1997 (aged 21)	(Scotland) Celtic	2017	Undisclosed
32	Rhys Healey	(England)	CF	6 December 1994 (aged 23)	(Wales) Cardiff City	2018	Loan

== Transfers ==
=== Transfers in ===
Date from	Position	Name	From	Fee	Ref.
1 July 2018	MF	(England) Lawson D'Ath	Luton Town	Free transfer	
1 July 2018	DF	(England) Mitch Hancox	Macclesfield Town	Free transfer	
1 July 2018	DF	(England) Jordan Moore-Taylor	Exeter City	Free transfer	
1 July 2018	MF	(England) Ryan Watson	Barnet	Free transfer	
6 July 2018	MF	(England) Jordan Houghton	Free agent (Note: Previous club: Chelsea.)	Free transfer	
9 July 2018	MF	(England) Ryan Harley	Free agent (Note: Previous club: Exeter City.)	Free transfer	
9 July 2018	FW	(England) Robbie Simpson	Free agent	Free transfer	
30 July 2018	DF	(France) Mathieu Baudry	Free agent (Note: Previous club: Doncaster Rovers.)	Free transfer	
1 August 2018	DF	(England) Baily Cargill	Free agent (Note: Previous club: Bournemouth.)	Free transfer	
2 August 2018	GK	(England) Stuart Moore	Swindon Town	Compensation	
15 January 2019	DF	(Scotland) Russell Martin	Free agent (Note: Previous club: Walsall.)	Free transfer	

=== Transfers out ===
Date from	Position	Name	To	Fee	Ref.
1 July 2018	MF	(Scotland) Connor Furlong	Released (Note: Joined Bedford Town on 10 August 2018.)		
1 July 2018	MF	(England) Hugo Logan	Released		
1 July 2018	MF	(England) Giorgio Rasulo	Released (Note: Joined Brackley Town on 9 August 2018.)		
1 July 2018	MF	(England) Nigel Reo-Coker	Released		
1 July 2018	MF	(England) Ed Upson	Bristol Rovers	Free transfer	
1 July 2018	DF	(England) Scott Wootton	Plymouth Argyle	Free transfer	
31 August 2018	FW	(Scotland) Robbie Muirhead	(Scotland) Dunfermline Athletic	Undisclosed	
2 January 2019	MF	(Scotland) Aidan Nesbitt	Released (Note: Mutual contract termination. Joined Dundee United on 4 January 2019.)		
3 January 2019	GK	(Netherlands) Wieger Sietsma	Released (Note: Mutual contract termination. Joined Hoang Anh Gia Lai on 16 January 2019.)		
31 January 2019	MF	(Scotland) Peter Pawlett	(Scotland) Dundee United	Undisclosed	
31 January 2019	FW	(Sweden) Osman Sow	(Scotland) Dundee United	Undisclosed	

=== Loans in ===
Start date	Position	Name	From	End date	Ref.
24 August 2018	FW	(England) Rhys Healey	(Wales) Cardiff City	January 2019	
25 January 2019	FW	(England) David Wheeler	Queens Park Rangers	End of season	
31 January 2019	MF	(England) Jake Hesketh	Southampton	End of season	
31 January 2019	FW	(England) Stephen Walker	Middlesbrough	End of season	

=== Loans out ===
Start date	Position	Name	To	End date	Ref.
30 October 2018	FW	(England) Sam Nombe	Oxford City	31 December 2018	
16 November 2018	DF	(England) Finn Tapp	Staines Town	1 January 2019	
23 November 2018	FW	(Ghana) Brandon Thomas-Asante	Sutton United	19 January 2019	
14 December 2018	FW	(England) Liam Sole	Hampton & Richmond Borough	25 January 2019	
11 January 2019	FW	(England) Sam Nombe	Maidenhead United	End of season	
25 January 2019	FW	(England) Liam Sole	St Albans City	End of season	
28 January 2019	FW	(Ghana) Brandon Thomas-Asante	Oxford City	End of season	

== Awards ==
- EFL League Two Manager of the Month (October 2018): Paul Tisdale
