= Callum Brittain =

English footballer (born 1998)

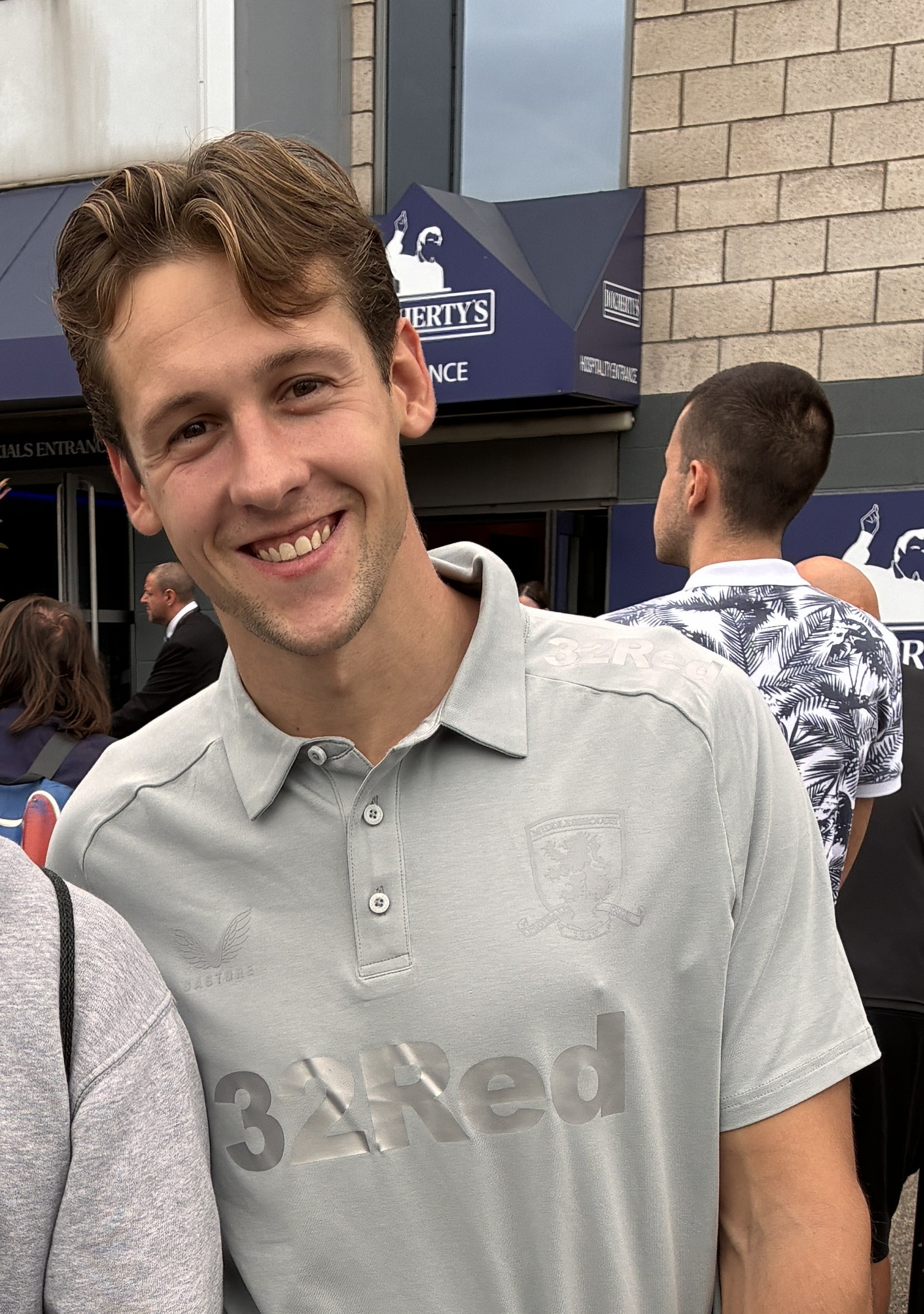
- Callum Brittain in 2025.

Personal information
- Full name: Callum James Brittain
- Date of birth: 12 March 1998 (age 28)
- Place of birth: Bedford, England
- Height: 5 ft 10 in (1.79 m)
- Position: Full-back

Team information
- Current team: Middlesbrough
- Number: 2

Youth career
- 2006–2016: Milton Keynes Dons

Senior career*
Years	Team	Apps	(Gls)
2016–2020	Milton Keynes Dons	102	(4)
2016	→ Þróttur (loan)	6	(0)
2020–2022	Barnsley	76	(0)
2022–2025	Blackburn Rovers	104	(3)
2025–	Middlesbrough	51	(1)

International career^{‡}
2017–2018	England U20	5	(0)
- * Club domestic league appearances and goals as of 02:45, 9 September 2026 (UTC) ‡ National team caps and goals as of 24 November 2018

Callum James Brittain (born 12 March 1998) is an English professional footballer who plays as a full-back for EFL Championship club Middlesbrough.

== Club career ==
=== Milton Keynes Dons ===
Brittain joined Milton Keynes Dons' academy in 2006 aged 8. On 27 April 2016, Brittain signed professional terms with the club ahead of the 2016–17 season.

On 2 May 2016, Brittain joined Icelandic Úrvalsdeild karla side Þróttur Reykjavík on a short-term loan deal until 18 July 2016. In total, Brittain featured 8 times for the club including being named man of the match in several performances. On 28 January 2017, Brittain made his first team league debut for MK Dons, coming on as a late substitute in a 0–4 away win to rivals Peterborough United. On 14 June 2017, Brittain's contract was extended until summer 2018.

On 2 September 2017, Brittain scored his first league goal for the club in a 1–1 draw with Oxford United having come on as a 35th-minute substitute for Ethan Ebanks-Landell. Following his first goal for the club and an international call up, Brittain was named EFL Young Player of the Month for September 2017. In January 2018, Brittain signed a new contract keeping him at the club until June 2020.

Having been released at the expiry of his contract due to the economic situation on 30 June 2020, he re-signed on a two-year deal with Milton Keynes Dons on 25 August 2020.

=== Barnsley ===
On 10 October 2020, Brittain joined Championship club Barnsley for an undisclosed fee, signing a three-year contract. In his debut season at Oakwell, Brittain started 40 league games for Barnsley. The club reached the Championship play-offs after finishing in fifth-place in the 2020–21 season. They were knocked out by Swansea City at the semi-final stage of the play-offs. Barnsley were relegated from the Championship in the 2021–22 season.

=== Blackburn Rovers ===
On 21 July 2022, Brittain joined Blackburn Rovers for an undisclosed fee on a four-year contract. On 24 October 2023, Brittain scored his first goal for Blackburn in a 2–1 away win against Millwall. In July 2025, Blackburn manager Valerien Ismael said that he wanted to keep Brittain, but the defender had rejected the club's offer of a new contract and had refused to take part in Blackburn's friendly match against Accrington Stanley.

=== Middlesbrough ===
On 4 August 2025, Brittain signed for Middlesbrough for an undisclosed fee. On 13 October 2026, he scored his first ever goal for the club in a 3–2 away victory over Stoke City.

== International career ==
On 28 September 2017 following an impressive start to the season, Brittain was called up to the England U20 squad, and went on to provide three assists in fixtures against Italy and Czech Republic. On 15 March 2018, Brittain was again called up to the squad for fixtures against Poland and Portugal.

== Career statistics ==
As of 13 October 2026

Club	Season	League			National cup (Note: Includes FA Cup, Icelandic Men's Football Cup)		League cup (Note: Includes EFL Cup)		Other		Total	
Club	Season	Division	Apps	Goals	Apps	Goals	Apps	Goals	Apps	Goals	Apps	Goals
Milton Keynes Dons	2016–17	League One	6	0	1	0	0	0	1 (Note: Appearances in EFL Trophy)	0	8	0
Milton Keynes Dons	2017–18	League One	29	2	2	0	2	0	0	0	33	2
Milton Keynes Dons	2018–19	League Two	32	1	1	0	1	0	3	0	37	1
Milton Keynes Dons	2019–20	League One	31	1	1	0	3	1	2	0	37	2
Milton Keynes Dons	2020–21	League One	4	0	0	0	1	0	2	0	7	0
Milton Keynes Dons	Total		102	4	5	0	7	1	8	0	122	5
Þróttur Reykjavík (loan)	2016	Úrvalsdeild	6	0	3	0	—		—		9	0
Barnsley	2020–21	Championship	40	0	3	0	—		2 (Note: Appearances in EFL Championship play-offs)	0	45	0
Barnsley	2021–22	Championship	36	0	1	0	0	0	—		37	0
Barnsley	Total		76	0	4	0	0	0	2	0	82	0
Blackburn Rovers	2022–23	Championship	27	0	2	0	0	0	—		29	0
Blackburn Rovers	2023–24	Championship	44	1	2	0	3	0	—		49	1
Blackburn Rovers	2024–25	Championship	33	2	1	0	1	0	—		35	2
Blackburn Rovers	Total		104	3	5	0	4	0	0	0	113	3
Middlesbrough	2025–26	Championship	41	0	0	0	1	0	3	0	45	0
Middlesbrough	2026–27	Championship	10	1	0	0	3	0	0	0	13	1
Middlesbrough	Total		51	1	0	0	4	0	3	0	58	1
Career total			339	8	17	0	15	1	13	0	384	9

== Honours ==
Milton Keynes Dons

- EFL League Two third-place promotion: 2018–19

Individual

- Milton Keynes Dons Academy Player of the Year: 2015–16
- EFL Young Player of the Month: September 2017
- Milton Keynes Dons Young Player of the Year: 2017–18
