= Wieger Sietsma =

Dutch footballer

Personal information
- Full name: Wieger Martin Frisco Sietsma
- Date of birth: 11 July 1995 (age 31)
- Place of birth: Groningen, Netherlands
- Height: 1.95 m (6 ft 5 in)
- Position: Goalkeeper

Youth career
- GRC Groningen
- 2006–2014: FC Groningen

Senior career*
Years	Team	Apps	(Gls)
2015–2017	SC Heerenveen	0	(0)
2016–2017	→ FC Emmen (loan)	6	(0)
2017–2019	Milton Keynes Dons	5	(0)
2019–2020	Hoàng Anh Gia Lai	18	(0)
Total		29	(0)

International career
2013	Netherlands U19	0	(0)
- * Club domestic league appearances and goals as of 23:00, 14 Sep 2019 (UTC)

Wieger Martin Frisco Sietsma (born 11 July 1995) is a Dutch former professional footballer who played as a goalkeeper for Hoàng Anh Gia Lai, Milton Keynes Dons, FC Emmen and SC Heerenveen.

== Club career ==
=== FC Emmen ===
He made his professional debut in the Eerste Divisie for FC Emmen on 9 September 2016 in a game against Helmond Sport.

=== Milton Keynes Dons ===
On 7 July 2017, Sietsma joined League One club Milton Keynes Dons on a free transfer, signing a two-year deal with an option of a further year.

Following injury to first choice goalkeeper Lee Nicholls, Sietsma made his league debut for the club on 14 April 2018 in a 1–2 home defeat to Doncaster Rovers. After becoming third choice goalkeeper following the signing of Stuart Moore, Sietsma left the club by mutual consent on 3 January 2019. In total he made 10 appearances in all competitions for the club.

=== Hoàng Anh Gia Lai ===
On 16 January 2019, Sietsma joined V.League 1 club Hoàng Anh Gia Lai on a free transfer. In September 2020, he retired from professional football.

== Career statistics ==
Club	Season	League			National Cup		League Cup		Other		Total	
Club	Season	Division	Apps	Goals	Apps	Goals	Apps	Goals	Apps	Goals	Apps	Goals
SC Heerenveen	2015–16	Eredivisie	0	0	0	0	—		—		0	0
SC Heerenveen	2016–17	Eredivisie	0	0	0	0	—		—		0	0
SC Heerenveen	Total		0	0	0	0	—		—		0	0
FC Emmen (loan)	2016–17	Eerste Divisie	6	0	0	0	—		—		6	0
Milton Keynes Dons	2017–18	League One	5	0	0	0	1	0	4 (Note: Appearances in EFL Trophy.)	0	10	0
Milton Keynes Dons	2018–19	League Two	0	0	0	0	0	0	0	0	0	0
Milton Keynes Dons	Total		5	0	0	0	1	0	4	0	10	0
Hoàng Anh Gia Lai	2019	V.League 1	18	0	2	0	—		—		20	0
Career total			29	0	2	0	1	0	4	0	36	0
