= Ousseynou Cissé =

Malian footballer (born 1991)

Personal information
- Date of birth: 7 April 1991 (age 35)
- Place of birth: Suresnes, France
- Height: 1.95 m (6 ft 5 in)
- Position: Defensive midfielder

Team information
- Current team: Mâcon

Youth career
- 1997–2001: Jouy-le-Moutier
- 2001–2008: Paris Saint-Germain
- 2008–2009: Amiens

Senior career*
Years	Team	Apps	(Gls)
2009–2012	Amiens	36	(0)
2012–2015	Dijon	93	(5)
2015–2016	Rayo Vallecano	0	(0)
2016	→ Waasland-Beveren (loan)	9	(1)
2016–2017	Tours	25	(1)
2017–2019	Milton Keynes Dons	58	(2)
2019–2020	Gillingham	2	(1)
2020	→ Leyton Orient (loan)	10	(1)
2020–2021	Leyton Orient	36	(1)
2021–2022	Oldham Athletic	8	(0)
2022–2023	Eastleigh	41	(3)
2023–2024	Ebbsfleet United	19	(2)
2024–	Mâcon	4	(1)

International career^{‡}
2015–2016	Mali	5	(0)
- * Club domestic league appearances and goals as of 7 December 2024 ‡ National team caps and goals as of 17:00, 29 July 2017 (UTC)

Ousseynou Cissé (born 7 April 1991) is a professional footballer who plays for Championnat National 3 club Mâcon. Born in France, he plays for the Mali national team.

Mainly a defensive midfielder, he can also play as a central defender.

== Early life ==
Cissé was born in Suresnes, France to a Malian father and a Senegalese mother.

== Club career ==
=== Amiens ===
Cissé joined Amiens' youth academy in 2007 aged 16, after a spell with Paris Saint-Germain. He made his senior debuts in 2009, appearing with the side in Championnat National.

On 5 August 2011 Cissé played his first match as a professional, starting in a 0–1 away loss against Stade de Reims for the Ligue 2 championship. He appeared in 19 matches during the campaign, as his side was relegated as dead last.

=== Dijon ===
On 19 July 2012, Cissé signed a two-year deal with Dijon, also in the second division. On 7 March 2014 he scored his first professional goal, scoring the second in a 2–2 draw with AJ Auxerre.

=== Rayo Vallecano ===
On 4 July 2015 Cissé moved abroad for the first time in his career, after agreeing to a three-year contract with La Liga side Rayo Vallecano. Following limited first team opportunities, Cissé joined Belgian side Waasland-Beveren in January 2016 on loan until the end of the 2015–16 season, making twelve appearances for the club and scoring once.

=== Tours ===
On 15 July 2016, after reaching an agreement with Rayo Vallecano to terminate his contract, Cissé joined Ligue 2 club Tours FC. Over the following season, Cissé made a total of 26 appearances in all competitions, and scoring once before being released by the club.

=== Milton Keynes Dons ===
On 29 June 2017, Cissé joined English League One club Milton Keynes Dons on a two-year deal. On 6 January 2018, Cissé scored his first goal for the club, the winning goal in a 0–1, third round FA Cup victory over Queens Park Rangers. On 11 August 2018, Cissé scored his first league goal, a 90th-minute winner, in a 1–0 home victory over Bury. After two seasons in which he made 68 appearances in all competitions and scored 3 goals, Cissé announced on 11 May 2019 he would be leaving the club at the end of the 2018–19 season.

=== Gillingham ===
On 24 June 2019, Cissé joined League One club Gillingham on a free transfer effective from 1 July 2019. He made his debut for the club in their opening fixture of the 2019–20 season, a 1–1 draw away to Doncaster Rovers. He scored his first and only goal for the club in the next league fixture as they were defeated 1–2 at home to Burton Albion.

He signed for League Two side Leyton Orient on a six-month loan deal on 17 January 2020 and remained with the club until the curtailment of the season due to the Coronavirus outbreak.

He was released by Gillingham at the conclusion of the 2019–20 season, having only made 5 appearances for the club in all competitions.

=== Leyton Orient ===
On 16 July 2020, Cissé joined Leyton Orient on a permanent basis, signing a two-year contract.

=== Oldham Athletic ===
On 7 August 2021, Cissé departed Leyton Orient by mutual agreement, joining Oldham Athletic on a one-year contract. Oldham confirmed at the end of the season that they would not be offering Cissé a new contract and he would be leaving the club.

=== Eastleigh ===
On 27 June 2022, Cissé agreed to join National League club Eastleigh following his departure from Oldham. He was released after one season at the club.

=== Ebbsfleet United ===
On 26 June 2023, Cissé signed for newly promoted National League club Ebbsfleet United.

== International career ==
Cissé was called up by Mali national team manager Alain Giresse for a friendly against Libya and a 2017 Africa Cup of Nations qualification match against South Sudan. He made his international debut on 6 June 2015, in a 2–2 draw against the former.

== Career statistics ==
=== Club ===
As of end of 2022–23 season

Appearances and goals by club, season and competition
Club	Season	League			National cup		League cup		Other		Total	
Club	Season	Division	Apps	Goals	Apps	Goals	Apps	Goals	Apps	Goals	Apps	Goals
Amiens	2009–10	Championnat National	9	0	0	0	—		—		9	0
Amiens	2010–11	Championnat National	8	0	1	0	—		—		9	0
Amiens	2011–12	Ligue 2	19	0	4	0	—		—		23	0
Amiens	Total		36	0	5	0	—		—		41	0
Dijon	2012–13	Ligue 2	24	0	2	0	—		—		26	0
Dijon	2013–14	Ligue 2	34	4	5	1	—		—		39	5
Dijon	2014–15	Ligue 2	35	1	3	0	—		—		38	1
Dijon	Total		93	5	10	1	—		—		103	6
Rayo Vallecano	2015–16	La Liga	0	0	0	0	—		—		0	0
Waasland-Beveren (loan)	2015–16	Belgian Pro League	9	1	3	0	—		—		12	1
Tours	2016–17	Ligue 2	25	1	1	0	—		—		26	1
Milton Keynes Dons	2017–18	League One	32	0	2	1	1	0	1 (Note: Appearance(s) in Football League Trophy)	0	36	1
Milton Keynes Dons	2018–19	League Two	26	2	1	0	2	0	3	0	32	2
Milton Keynes Dons	Total		58	2	3	1	3	0	4	0	68	3
Gillingham	2019–20	League One	2	1	0	0	0	0	3	0	5	1
Leyton Orient (loan)	2019–20	League Two	10	1	0	0	0	0	0	0	10	1
Leyton Orient	2020–21	League Two	36	1	0	0	1	0	1	0	38	1
Oldham Athletic	2021–22	League Two	8	0	0	0	1	0	2	0	11	0
Eastleigh	2022–23	National League	41	3	2	0	—		3 (Note: Appearance(s) in FA Trophy)	0	46	3
Career total			318	15	24	2	5	0	13	0	360	17

=== International ===
As of match played 27 May 2016

Appearances and goals by national team and year
National team	Year	Apps	Goals
Mali	2015	4	0
Mali	2016	1	0
Total		5	0

== Honours ==
Amiens

- Championnat National runner-up: 2010–11

Milton Keynes Dons

- EFL League Two third-place promotion: 2018–19
