= Kabongo Tshimanga =

DR Congolese footballer (born 1997)

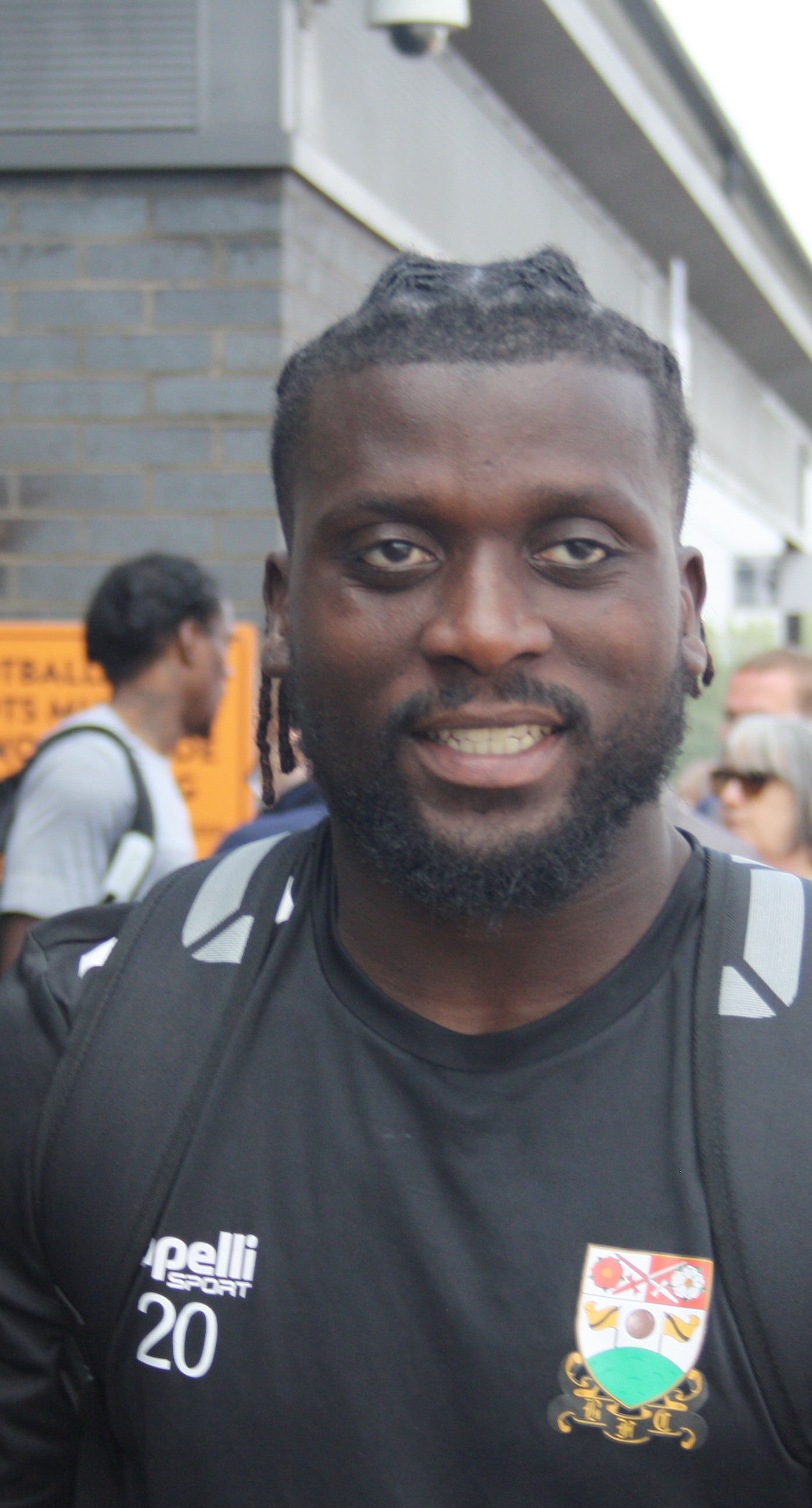
- Tshimanga in 2026

Personal information
- Full name: Kabongo Tshimanga
- Date of birth: 22 July 1997 (age 29)
- Place of birth: Kinshasa, DR Congo
- Height: 1.80 m (5 ft 11 in)
- Position: Forward

Team information
- Current team: Barnet
- Number: 20

Youth career
- 2005–2014: Milton Keynes Dons

Senior career*
Years	Team	Apps	(Gls)
2014–2017	Milton Keynes Dons	6	(0)
2015	→ Aldershot Town (loan)	2	(0)
2015	→ Chelmsford City (loan)	4	(0)
2015	→ Corby Town (loan)	10	(5)
2015–2016	→ Nuneaton Town (loan)	5	(1)
2016	→ Chesham United (loan)	7	(0)
2016	→ Þróttur (loan)	6	(0)
2017	→ Yeovil Town (loan)	0	(0)
2017–2018	Boston United	34	(8)
2018–2019	Oxford City	42	(24)
2019–2021	Boreham Wood	79	(38)
2021–2023	Chesterfield	44	(31)
2023	→ Peterborough United (loan)	8	(0)
2023–2025	Peterborough United	2	(0)
2023–2024	→ Fleetwood Town (loan)	14	(0)
2024	→ Boreham Wood (loan)	16	(7)
2024–2025	→ Swindon Town (loan)	39	(11)
2025–2026	Crawley Town	23	(4)
2026–	Barnet	33	(22)

International career^{‡}
2019	England C	1	(0)
- * Club domestic league appearances and goals as of 22:23, 27 October 2026 (UTC) ‡ National team caps and goals as of 08:25, 28 April 2019 (UTC)

Kabongo Tshimanga (born 22 July 1997) is a professional footballer who plays as a forward for EFL League Two club Barnet.

Tshimanga came through the youth ranks at Milton Keynes Dons, later spending time on loan with non-league sides Aldershot Town, Chelmsford City, Corby Town, Nuneaton Town, Chesham United as well as Icelandic side Þróttur and EFL League Two side Yeovil Town. He later had a spell with Boston United before a prolific spell with Oxford City that yielded 24 league goals in 42 games. In 2019 he moved to Boreham Wood where he notched up a further 38 goals in 79 appearances. In 2021 he signed for Chesterfield. Born in the Democratic Republic of the Congo, Tshimanga has previously represented the England C team.

== Club career ==
=== Milton Keynes Dons ===
Tshimanga joined Milton Keynes Dons at U10 level. After scoring 27 youth team goals, Tshimanga was rewarded with a squad number early in the 2014–15 season despite only recently turning 18. He made his first team debut on 8 November, coming on as a late substitute for Benik Afobe in a 4–3 FA Cup first round victory over Port Vale at Vale Park. Tshimanga signed his first professional contract with the club on 3 January 2015. On 30 January 2015, Tshimanga joined Aldershot Town of the Conference on loan having scored 42 goals in 25 games for MK Dons U18 team.

Tshimanga spent the entire 2015–16 season on loan to several non-League clubs, including brief spells with Corby Town, Nuneaton Town and Chesham United. On 18 August 2015 he scored an eight-minute hat-trick for Corby Town against Hednesford Town. Following the conclusion of the season, Tshimanga briefly joined Icelandic Úrvalsdeild side Throttur Reykjavik on a short-term loan deal until July 2016.

Tshimanga found more first team opportunities with the Dons during the first half of the 2016–17 season following the club's relegation, and made his first team debut as an 87th-minute substitute on 20 August 2016 away to Rochdale. However, after spending the second half of the season on loan to Yeovil Town, Tshimanga was released from the club in June 2017.

=== Boston United ===
Following his release, Tshimanga joined National League North side Boston United on 1 July 2017, signing a one-year deal before going on to make 34 league appearances and scoring 8 goals.

=== Oxford City ===
Following the expiry of his contract, Tshimanga opted to join National League South side Oxford City in June 2018. On 10 November 2018, Tshimanga scored a hat-trick in an FA Cup first round 3–3 draw away to Tranmere Rovers. Tshimanga ended his first season as top scorer with 29 goals in all competitions, and was also the recipient of the club's Supporters' and Players' Player of the Year awards. He was later named in the 2018–19 National League South Team of the Year.

=== Boreham Wood ===
On 1 July 2019, Tshimanga signed for National League club Boreham Wood on a two-year deal. In his first season he helped the club to a play-off finish, scoring 19 goals in 37 appearances in the process.

=== Chesterfield ===
On 10 August 2021, despite rumoured interest from Football League sides, Tshimanga joined National League side Chesterfield for an undisclosed fee on a three-year deal. After scoring nine goals in his first six weeks of the season, he was awarded the league's Player of the Month award for August/September 2021. Tshimanga finished the campaign with 25 goals in 31 appearances in all competitions, and was named in the league's Team of the Year for the third consecutive season.

=== Peterborough United ===
On 31 January 2023, Tshimanga joined League One side Peterborough United after agreeing a loan deal until the end of the season ahead of a permanent transfer in the summer. Tshimanga joined Fleetwood Town on loan in the summer of 2023 but was recalled by Peterborough on 1 February 2024, on which day he returned to Boreham Wood on loan until the end of the season.

On 12 May 2024, Peterborough announced the player had been transfer-listed.

==== Swindon Town loan ====
On 27 August 2024, Tshimanga joined League Two side Swindon Town on loan for the season. He scored his first goal for the club in a 4–0 win against Newport on 14 September 2024.

On 6 May 2024, Peterborough announced the player would leave the club in June when his contract expired.

=== Crawley Town ===
On 1 July 2025, Tshimaga joined League Two side Crawley Town on a two-year contract.

=== Barnet ===
On 22 January 2026, Tshimanga signed for fellow League Two club Barnet for an undisclosed fee, scoring two goals on his debut at home to Oldham Athletic.

Tshimanga was named EFL League Two Player of the Month for October 2026 following a run of six goals in as many matches.

== Personal life ==
Tshimanga's parents live in the UK. He has two brothers, Claude and Roman, and two sisters, Jily and Rosalie, who also live in the UK.

== International career ==
Tshimanga is eligible to play for both England and the Democratic Republic of the Congo. In April 2019, he was called up to the England C squad for a friendly fixture, on 9 April 2019, against a Bedfordshire FA XI to mark the association's 125th anniversary.

== Style of play ==
Speaking in November 2014, then Milton Keynes Dons manager Karl Robinson described Tshimanga as "quick, powerful, he wants to run at people and he's a constant threat."

== Career statistics ==
As of 27 October 2026

Appearances and goals by club, season and competition
Club	Season	League			National cup (Note: Includes FA Cup, Icelandic Men's Football Cup)		League cup (Note: Includes EFL Cup)		Other		Total	
Club	Season	Division	Apps	Goals	Apps	Goals	Apps	Goals	Apps	Goals	Apps	Goals
Milton Keynes Dons	2014–15	League One	0	0	1	0	0	0	0	0	1	0
Milton Keynes Dons	2015–16	Championship	0	0	0	0	0	0	—		0	0
Milton Keynes Dons	2016–17	League One	6	0	1	0	2	1	3 (Note: Appearance(s) in EFL Trophy)	0	12	1
Milton Keynes Dons	Total		6	0	2	0	2	1	3	0	13	1
Aldershot Town (loan)	2014–15	Conference Premier	2	0	—		—		—		2	0
Chelmsford City (loan)	2014–15	Conference South	4	0	—		—		—		4	0
Corby Town (loan)	2015–16	National League North	10	5	2	0	—		1 (Note: Appearance in Northamptonshire Senior Cup)	0	13	5
Nuneaton Town (loan)	2015–16	National League North	5	1	—		—		2 (Note: One appearance in FA Trophy, one appearance and one goal in Birmingham Senior Cup)	1	7	2
Chesham United (loan)	2015–16	SL Premier Division	7	0	—		—		—		7	0
Þróttur (loan)	2016	Úrvalsdeild	6	0	1	1	—		—		7	1
Yeovil Town (loan)	2016–17	League Two	0	0	—		—		—		0	0
Boston United	2017–18	National League North	34	8	3	3	—		1 (Note: Appearance(s) in FA Trophy)	1	38	12
Oxford City	2018–19	National League South	42	24	6	7	—		6 (Note: Three appearances and four goals in FA Trophy, three appearances and two goals in Oxfordshire Senior Cup)	6	54	37
Boreham Wood	2019–20	National League	37	19	1	0	—		3 (Note: One appearance in FA Trophy, two appearances in National League play-offs)	0	41	19
Boreham Wood	2020–21	National League	42	19	4	3	—		1	0	47	22
Boreham Wood	Total		79	38	5	3	—		4	0	88	41
Chesterfield	2021–22	National League	27	24	4	1	—		0	0	31	25
Chesterfield	2022–23	National League	17	7	5	1	—		0	0	22	8
Chesterfield	Total		44	31	9	2	—		0	0	53	33
Peterborough United (loan)	2022–23	League One	8	0	—		—		1 (Note: Appearance in EFL League One play-offs)	0	9	0
Peterborough United	2023–24	League One	2	0	0	0	2	0	0	0	4	0
Peterborough United	2024–25	League One	0	0	0	0	0	0	0	0	0	0
Peterborough United	Total		2	0	0	0	2	0	0	0	4	0
Fleetwood Town (loan)	2023–24	League One	14	0	2	0	—		4	2	20	2
Boreham Wood (loan)	2023–24	National League	16	7	—		—		—		16	7
Swindon Town (loan)	2024–25	League Two	39	11	2	1	0	0	3	1	44	13
Crawley Town	2025–26	League Two	23	4	0	0	1	1	2	0	26	5
Barnet	2025–26	League Two	21	12	0	0	0	0	0	0	21	12
Barnet	2026–27	League Two	12	10	0	0	1	1	0	0	13	11
Barnet	Total		33	22	0	0	1	1	0	0	34	23
Career total			374	151	32	17	6	3	27	11	439	182

== Honours ==
Individual

- National League South Team of the Year: 2018–19
- National League Team of the Year: 2019–20, 2020–21, 2021–22
- EFL League Two Player of the Month: October 2026
- National League Player of the Month: August/September 2021
- Oxford City Players' Player of the Year: 2018–19
- Oxford City Player of the Year: 2018–19
- Chesterfield Players' Player of the Year: 2021–22
- Chesterfield Player of the Year: 2021–22
