= Mark Randall (footballer) =

English footballer (born 1989)

- Randall with Larne in 2026

Personal information
- Full name: Mark Leonard Randall
- Date of birth: 28 September 1989 (age 37)
- Place of birth: Milton Keynes, England
- Height: 6 ft 0 in (1.83 m)
- Position: Midfielder

Team information
- Current team: Larne
- Number: 8

Youth career
- –2001: Northampton Town
- 2001–2006: Arsenal

Senior career*
Years	Team	Apps	(Gls)
2006–2011	Arsenal	2	(0)
2008	→ Burnley (loan)	10	(0)
2010	→ Milton Keynes Dons (loan)	16	(0)
2010–2011	→ Rotherham United (loan)	10	(1)
2011–2013	Chesterfield	45	(2)
2013–2014	Ascoli	3	(0)
2014–2016	Milton Keynes Dons	13	(0)
2016	Barnet	12	(2)
2016–2017	Newport County	25	(1)
2017–2019	Crawley Town	38	(1)
2019	Hemel Hempstead Town	6	(0)
2019–	Larne	177	(24)

International career
2005–2006	England U17	12	(2)
2006–2008	England U18	9	(1)
- * Club domestic league appearances and goals as of 29 April 2026

Mark Leonard Randall (born 28 September 1989) is an English professional footballer who plays as a midfielder for NIFL Premiership club Larne.

Randall spent his formative footballing years at Arsenal where he was touted by manager Arsène Wenger as a key Arsenal player for the future. He was released at the end of his contract in 2011 and subsequently joined Chesterfield, where he won the Football League Trophy.

== Early life ==
Born in Milton Keynes, Randall grew up amongst a family of Tottenham Hotspur supporters, but says he is "100% a Gooner".

== Career ==
=== Arsenal ===
After playing youth football for Northampton Town, Randall joined Arsenal's academy in 2001. Randall signed for Arsenal on schoolboy forms and played seven matches in the Premier Reserve League in 2005–06. Randall was also the only player in the team to play all 18 reserve team fixtures in the 2007–08 season. He played in Dennis Bergkamp's testimonial against Ajax Amsterdam in July 2006, and in the club's pre-season tour of Austria and the Netherlands. He made his first-team debut as a substitute for Denílson in Arsenal's League Cup third-round match against West Bromwich Albion on 24 October 2006. He also played in Arsenal's fourth-round match against Everton on 8 November 2006, again coming on for Denílson, and was on the bench for their quarter-final against Liverpool, but did not play in that match.

On 8 February 2007, he signed his first professional contract with Arsenal, and in the summer of 2007 took part in Arsenal's annual first-team pre-season training camp in Austria. However, he was out of the side for the first few months of the 2007–08 season after suffering an injury in Arsenal Reserves' opening Premier Reserve League match of the season, against Fulham in late August, but made his first start for Arsenal in the League Cup quarter-final against Blackburn Rovers on 18 December 2007, and also made his second appearance in the competition as a last-minute substitute in the first leg of the semi-finals against Tottenham Hotspur.

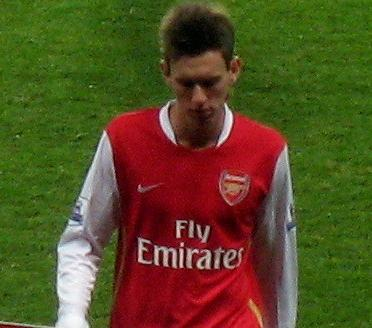
Randall with Arsenal in 2008

Randall signed for Burnley on loan, on 31 January 2008, the last day of the transfer window and made 10 league appearances for the Championship club. He returned to Arsenal following the end of the Championship season on 4 May and went on to make his Premier League debut against Sunderland on 11 May in Arsenal's final match of the season. He came on as an 81st-minute substitute and having a goal disallowed in the final moments of the match.

After playing in much of Arsenal's pre-season campaign for 2008–09, Randall made his European debut in Arsenal's UEFA Champions League third qualifying round match away to FC Twente on 13 August 2008, coming on as a substitute for Theo Walcott in the 84th minute. He also played the full 90 minutes in Arsenal's 6–0 League Cup third round victory over Sheffield United on 23 September, where he set up Arsenal's fifth goal, scored by Jack Wilshere and in the 3–0 win over Wigan Athletic, as well as starting in the defeat to Burnley at the quarter final stage. He made UEFA Champions League debut on 10 December in the 2–0 defeat to F.C. Porto replacing Alexandre Song.

At the start of the season, a loan was agreed, in principle, for Randall to move to Championship side Derby County on a season-long loan, though the club declined to sign the player after he failed to impress on trial. Randall was involved in Arsenal's win over West Bromwich Albion in the League Cup after replacing Francis Coquelin on 58 minutes and indirectly assisted Carlos Vela when his attempted lob from outside the box struck the bar. On 15 January, Randall signed on loan for Milton Keynes Dons until the end of the season. He scored his first goal for Milton Keynes Dons in the 3–1 Football League Trophy second leg semi final loss to Southampton.

Randall was once again sent on loan for the 2010–11 season, this time to a League Two side in Rotherham United. After playing just 21 minutes on his Rotherham debut against Southend United, Randall was sidelined with a broken collarbone. This injury kept him out of the team until the New Year's Day clash against Port Vale in which Randall scored his only goal for the Millers. At the end of his loan spell he returned to Arsenal where his contract was not renewed, signalling the end of his Arsenal career.

=== Chesterfield ===
Randall completed a move to League One's Chesterfield on a one-year contract during the summer of 2011. Upon signing he stated this it was a move in which he intended to use to rebuild his career and fulfil his potential after growing disillusioned with life at Arsenal and disheartening loan spells. Manager John Sheridan stated that Randall possesses great potential that he hopes will be fulfilled at the club.

He impressed when scoring his first goal and for Chesterfield in a 3–1 win over Notts County on 4 October 2011 in the Football League Trophy. His time at Chesterfield was dogged by niggling injuries, including wrist and shoulder afflictions that interrupted his run in the team. However, in the Football League Trophy Final on 25 March 2012, he came on as a substitute as Chesterfield defeated Swindon Town 2–0, setting up the second goal with an incisive pass. He went on to appear in the subsequent games, impressing as Chesterfield's form drastically improved, although by that time relegation was already all-but-confirmed. He was offered a new one-year contract by the club in May 2012. After failing to agree a new contract with Chesterfield, Randall left the club on 1 July 2013 after his contract expired. Altogether Randall scored four goals and was capped a sum of 51 times with Chesterfield.

=== Ascoli ===
On 10 September 2013 it was announced that Randall had signed a two-year contract with Italian third-tier side Ascoli. He made his debut on 22 September 2013 versus L'Aquila. On his first start for the club Randall assisted three goals and was the man of the match.

=== Milton Keynes Dons ===
On 8 March 2014, Milton Keynes Dons announced that Randall had agreed to join the club until the end of the season, subject to international clearance. On 14 March, Randall completed his move to the Dons after receiving international clearance. At the end of the season he signed a further one-year contract, with the option of a further 12 months. His contract was extended until the end of 2015–16, but he did not play at all for the Dons following their promotion to the Championship. In all he played 17 times across all competitions.

=== Barnet ===
On 14 January 2016, following a mutual decision to terminate his contract with Milton Keynes Dons, Randall joined League Two side Barnet on a contract until the end of the 2015–16 season. He was released at the end of the season.

=== Newport County ===
On 31 May 2016, Mark Randall joined Newport County on a two-year deal. He made his debut for Newport on 6 August 2016 versus Mansfield Town. He scored his first goal for Newport, a 55th-minute penalty, in a 3–2 EFL Cup loss against Milton Keynes Dons on 9 August 2016.

In January 2017, Randall asked to be transferred, stating family reasons. A move in the January transfer window did not happen and Randall was dropped from the match day squad by manager Graham Westley. In March 2017, Randall returned to the squad under new manager Mike Flynn and played a big part in County's successful bid to avoid relegation. At the end of the 2016–17 season Randall was again placed on the transfer list at his request. On 28 June 2017, Randall's contract at Newport was cancelled by mutual consent.

=== Crawley Town ===
On 30 June 2017, Randall joined fellow League Two side Crawley Town on a two-year deal. His contract was terminated by mutual consent on 5 February 2019.

=== Hemel Hempstead Town ===
Randall joined National League South club Hemel Hempstead Town in March 2019.

=== Larne ===
On 1 June 2019, Randall joined newly promoted NIFL Premiership club Larne.

== Style of play ==
Randall is a midfielder. He plays primarily as a central midfielder but can also play as advanced playmaking midfielder. He is noted for his composure on the ball and his passing abilities.

== Career statistics ==
As of matches played 18 May 2021

Appearances and goals by club, season and competition
Club	Season	League			National Cup		League Cup		Other		Total	
Club	Season	Division	Apps	Goals	Apps	Goals	Apps	Goals	Apps	Goals	Apps	Goals
Arsenal	2006–07	Premier League	0	0	0	0	2	0	0	0	2	0
Arsenal	2007–08	Premier League	1	0	0	0	2	0	0	0	3	0
Arsenal	2008–09	Premier League	1	0	0	0	3	0	2 (Note: Appearance(s) in UEFA Champions League)	0	6	0
Arsenal	2009–10	Premier League	0	0	0	0	2	0	0	0	2	0
Arsenal	Total		2	0	0	0	9	0	2	0	13	0
Burnley (loan)	2007–08	Championship	10	0	0	0	0	0	—		10	0
Milton Keynes Dons (loan)	2009–10	League One	16	0	0	0	0	0	2 (Note: Appearance(s) in Football League Trophy)	1	18	1
Rotherham United (loan)	2010–11	League Two	10	1	0	0	0	0	0	0	10	1
Chesterfield	2011–12	League One	16	1	0	0	0	0	2	1	18	2
Chesterfield	2012–13	League Two	29	1	2	1	0	0	2	0	33	2
Chesterfield	Total		45	2	2	1	0	0	4	1	51	4
Ascoli	2013–14	Lega Pro Prima Divisione	3	0	0	0	—		—		3	0
Milton Keynes Dons	2013–14	League One	4	0	0	0	0	0	0	0	4	0
Milton Keynes Dons	2014–15	League One	9	0	2	0	1	0	1	0	13	0
Milton Keynes Dons	2015–16	Championship	0	0	0	0	0	0	—		0	0
Milton Keynes Dons	Total		13	0	2	0	1	0	1	0	17	0
Barnet	2015–16	League Two	12	2	0	0	0	0	0	0	12	2
Newport County	2016–17	League Two	25	1	0	0	1	0	1 (Note: Appearance(s) in EFL Trophy)	1	27	2
Crawley Town	2017–18	League Two	32	1	0	0	0	0	1	0	33	1
Crawley Town	2018–19	League Two	6	0	0	0	1	0	3	0	10	0
Crawley Town	Total		38	1	0	0	1	0	4	0	43	1
Hemel Hempstead Town	2018–19	National League South	6	0	—		—		—		6	0
Larne	2019–20	NIFL Premiership	28	7	1	0	0	0	0	0	29	7
Larne	2020–21	NIFL Premiership	26	3	3	0	0	0	4 (Note: Appearance(s)in County Antrim Shield)	0	33	3
Larne	Total		54	10	4	0	0	0	4	0	62	10
Career total			234	17	8	1	12	0	18	3	272	21

== Honours ==
Chesterfield

- Football League Trophy: 2011–12

Milton Keynes Dons

- Football League One runner-up: 2014–15

Larne

- NIFL Premiership (3): 2022–23, 2023-24, 2025-26
- County Antrim Shield (4): 2020–21, 2021–22, 2022–23, 2023–24
- NIFL Charity Shield (2): 2024, 2026
