= 2014–15 Milton Keynes Dons F.C. season =

Milton Keynes Dons
2014–15 season
- Chairman: Pete Winkelman
- Manager: Karl Robinson
- Stadium: Stadium mk
- League One: 2nd (promoted to Championship)
- FA Cup: Second round
- League Cup: Fourth round
- League Trophy: Second round
- Top goalscorer: League: Will Grigg (21); All: Will Grigg (23)
- Highest home attendance: 26,969 (vs Manchester United); 26 August 2014, League Cup R2
- Lowest home attendance: 4,407 (vs AFC Wimbledon); 7 October 2014, League Trophy R2
- Average home league attendance: 9,452
- Biggest win: 7–0 (vs Oldham Athletic); 20 December 2014, League One
- Biggest defeat: 4–2 (vs Gillingham); 14 February 2015, League One
Home colours	Away colours	Third colours

The 2014–15 season was Milton Keynes Dons' eleventh season in their existence as a professional association football club, and their seventh consecutive season competing in Football League One.

As well as competing in League One, the club also participated in the FA Cup, League Cup and League Trophy.

The season covers the period from 1 July 2014 to 30 June 2015.

== Season review ==
With what turned out to be a successful summer transfer window, manager Karl Robinson signed forwards Benik Afobe and Will Grigg on loan from Arsenal and Brentford respectively, as well as former loanee Samir Carruthers from Aston Villa on a permanent deal. Centre-back Kyle McFadzean was also brought in from Crawley Town.

Following a 3–1 home victory over rivals AFC Wimbledon in the first round at the beginning of August, the club were handed a lucrative second round League Cup draw at home to Manchester United. Against all odds, the Dons won the tie 4–0 through goals from Grigg and Afobe against a United team which included established Premier League players David de Gea, Javier Hernandez, Shinji Kagawa and Danny Welbeck.

The result set the tone for the remainder of the season. The Dons spent the majority of the year in promotion contention and achieved several notable victories including a club record 7–0 home win over Oldham Athletic, a 6–0 home win over Colchester United and 6–1 home wins over both Crewe Alexandra and Leyton Orient. At the end of the January 2015 transfer window, academy graduate Dele Alli was sold to Premier League side Tottenham Hotspur for a club record fee in the region of £5m plus add-on incentives and arrangements which included Alli being loaned back immediately for the remainder of the campaign.

For the final few weeks of the season, the club were in competition with Preston North End and Swindon Town for second place (the final automatic promotion spot). With a considerable points gap to claw back, the Dons managed to obtain 25 points from a possible 27 to ensure the battle for promotion came down to the final day.

With Preston in second place on 89 points and MK Dons in third on 88, Preston faced relegation-threatened Colchester United and only needed to match or better the Dons' result against already relegated Yeovil Town to ensure promotion. MK Dons went on to defeat Yeovil 5–1. With Preston losing away to Colchester, the Dons secured second place against the odds, achieving promotion to the second tier for the first time since their formation in 2004 along with a club record goal tally of 101 league goals.

== Competitions ==
=== League One ===
Final table

Pos	Team	Pld	W	D	L	GF	GA	GD	Pts
1	Bristol City (C, P)	46	29	12	5	96	38	+58	99
2	Milton Keynes Dons (P)	46	27	10	9	101	44	+57	91
3	Preston North End (P)	46	25	14	7	79	40	+39	89
4	Swindon Town	46	23	10	13	76	57	+19	79
5	Sheffield United	46	19	14	13	66	53	+13	71

Source: Sky Sports

Matches

Win	Draw	Loss

Date	Opponent	Venue	Result	Scorers	Attendance	Ref
9 August 2014 – 15:00	Gillingham	Home	4–2	Hause (o.g.), Grigg, McFadzean, Legge (o.g.)	7,595	
16 August 2014 – 15:00	Peterborough United	Away	2–3	Alli, Powell	7,115	
19 August 2014 – 19:45	Chesterfield	Away	1–0	Afobe	5,811	
23 August 2014 – 15:00	Coventry City	Home	0–0		10,600	
30 August 2014 – 15:00	Crawley Town	Home	2–0	Alli, Afobe	7,148	
13 September 2014 – 15:00	Barnsley	Away	5–3	Afobe, Carruthers, Alli, Grigg, Reeves	9,192	
16 September 2014 – 19:45	Bradford City	Home	1–2	Lewington	7,139	
20 September 2014 – 15:00	Crewe Alexandra	Home	6–1	Alli (3), Grigg, Afobe, Reeves	7,049	
27 September 2014 – 15:00	Bristol City	Away	2–3	Bowditch, Afobe	13,119	
4 October 2014 – 15:00	Yeovil Town	Away	2–0	Grigg, Powell	4,000	
18 October 2014 – 15:00	Leyton Orient	Away	0–0		5,014	
21 October 2014 – 19:45	Fleetwood Town	Home	2–1	McFadzean, Afobe	6,736	
25 October 2014 – 15:00	Doncaster Rovers	Away	0–0		5,976	
1 November 2014 – 15:00	Swindon Town	Home	2–1	Alli, Kay	9,494	
22 November 2014 – 15:00	Port Vale	Home	1–0	C. Baker	12,007	
25 November 2014 – 19:45	Rochdale	Home	2–2	Grigg, Green	6,720	
29 November 2014 – 15:00	Colchester United	Home	6–0	Alli, Afobe (3), Reeves, Hodson	7,646	
2 December 2014 – 19:45	Sheffield United	Away	1–0	Alli	17,030	
13 December 2014 – 15:00	Preston North End	Away	1–1	C. Baker	9,856	
20 December 2014 – 15:00	Oldham Athletic	Home	7–0	Grigg (2), Bowditch, Potter, Alli, Afobe, C. Baker	7,998	
26 December 2014 – 15:00	Notts County	Away	1–0	Powell	5,897	
28 December 2014 – 15:00	Walsall	Home	0–3		9,311	
10 January 2015 – 15:00	Crawley Town	Away	2–2	Grigg, Alli	2,468	
17 January 2015 – 15:00	Sheffield United	Home	1–0	C. Baker	9,633	
24 January 2015 – 15:00	Barnsley	Home	2–0	Alli, Grigg	8,310	
27 January 2015 – 19:45	Scunthorpe United	Away	1–1	McFadzean	3,005	
31 January 2015 – 15:00	Crewe Alexandra	Away	5–0	Cole (2), Bowditch, C. Baker, Powell	4,319	
7 February 2015 – 15:00	Bristol City	Home	0–0		15,642	
9 February 2015 – 19:45	Bradford City	Away	1–2	Alli	11,948	
14 February 2015 – 15:00	Gillingham	Away	2–4	Cole, Reeves	5,107	
17 February 2015 – 19:45	Colchester United	Away	1–0	Alli	2,974	
21 February 2015 – 15:00	Peterborough United	Home	3–0	Grigg, Reeves (2)	11,162	
28 February 2015 – 15:00	Coventry City	Away	1–2	Powell	9,934	
3 March 2015 – 19:45	Chesterfield	Home	1–2	L. Baker	7,335	
7 March 2015 – 15:00	Preston North End	Home	0–2		10,618	
14 March 2015 – 15:00	Walsall	Away	1–1	Grigg	3,887	
17 March 2015 – 19:45	Oldham Athletic	Away	3–1	Bowditch, Powell, Grigg	2,445	
21 March 2015 – 15:00	Notts County	Home	4–1	C. Baker, L. Baker, Grigg (2)	11,911	
4 April 2015 – 12:15	Swindon Town	Away	3–0	Powell, Grigg (2)	10,087	
7 April 2015 – 19:45	Scunthorpe United	Home	2–0	Grigg (2)	8,087	
11 April 2015 – 15:00	Port Vale	Away	0–0		4,379	
14 April 2015 – 19:45	Fleetwood Town	Away	3–0	L. Baker, Grigg, Alli	2,752	
18 April 2015 – 15:00	Leyton Orient	Home	6–1	Bowditch, Hall (3), Grigg, Alli	10,137	
21 April 2015 – 19:45	Doncaster Rovers	Home	3–0	Bowditch, C. Baker (2)	8,159	
25 April 2015 – 15:00	Rochdale	Away	3–2	Carrthers, Bowditch, Powell	3,501	
3 May 2015 – 12:15	Yeovil Town	Home	5–1	C. Baker, Lewington (2), Potter, Grigg	16,965	

=== FA Cup ===
Matches

Win	Draw	Loss

Date	Round	Opponent	Venue	Result	Scorers	Attendance	Ref
8 November 2014 – 15:00	First round	Port Vale	Away	4–3	Afobe (2), C. Baker, Green	4,120	
6 December 2014 – 15:00	Second round	Chesterfield	Home	0–1 (Note: Due to Chesterfield fielding an ineligible player, the FA ruled the tie be replayed.)		5,591	
2 January 2015 – 19:45	Second round	Chesterfield	Home	0–1		8,040	

=== League Cup ===
Matches

Win	Draw	Loss

Date	Round	Opponent	Venue	Result	Scorers	Attendance	Ref
12 August 2014 – 19:45	First round	AFC Wimbledon	Home	3–1	McFadzean, Powell, Afobe	7,171	
26 August 2014 – 19:45	Second round	Manchester United	Home	4–0	Grigg (2), Afobe (2)	26,969	
23 September 2014 – 19:45	Third round	Bradford City	Home	2–0	Afobe (2)	5,707	
28 October 2014 – 19:45	Fourth round	Sheffield United	Home	1–2	Afobe	8,520	

=== League Trophy ===
Matches

Win	Draw	Loss

Date	Round	Opponent	Venue	Result	Scorers	Attendance	Ref
7 October 2014 – 19:45	Second round	AFC Wimbledon	Home	2–3	Powell, Afobe	4,407	

== Player details ==
Note: Players' ages as of the club's opening fixture of the 2014–15 season.

#	Name	Nationality	Position	Date of birth (age)	Signed from	Signed in	Transfer fee
Goalkeepers
1	David Martin	(England)	GK	22 January 1986 (aged 28)	(England) Liverpool	2010	Free
16	Ian McLoughlin	(Republic of Ireland)	GK	9 August 1991 (aged 23)	(England) Ipswich Town	2011	Free
29	Charlie Burns	(England)	GK	27 May 1995 (aged 19)	Academy	2014	Trainee
Defenders
2	Lee Hodson	(Northern Ireland)	RB	2 October 1991 (aged 22)	Free agent	2013	Free
3	Dean Lewington	(England)	LB	18 May 1984 (aged 30)	(England) Wimbledon	2004	Free
4	Tom Flanagan	(Northern Ireland)	CB	21 October 1991 (aged 22)	Academy	2010	Trainee
5	Kyle McFadzean	(England)	CB	28 February 1987 (aged 27)	(England) Crawley Town	2014	Undisclosed
6	Antony Kay	(England)	CB	21 October 1982 (aged 31)	(England) Huddersfield Town	2012	Free
12	Jordan Spence	(England)	RB	24 May 1990 (aged 24)	Free agent	2014	Free
23	Joe Walsh	(Wales)	CB	13 May 1992 (aged 22)	(England) Crawley Town	2015	Loan
24	Ben Tilney	(England)	LB	28 February 1997 (aged 17)	Academy	2014	Trainee
25	Harry Hickford	(England)	CB	23 June 1996 (aged 18)	Academy	2014	Trainee
Midfielders
8	Darren Potter	(Republic of Ireland)	DM	21 December 1984 (aged 29)	(England) Sheffield Wednesday	2011	Free
10	Ben Reeves	(Northern Ireland)	AM	19 November 1991 (aged 22)	Free agent	2013	Free
13	Carl Baker	(England)	AM	26 December 1982 (aged 31)	Free agent	2014	Free
14	Dele Alli	(England)	CM	11 April 1996 (aged 18)	(England) Tottenham Hotspur	2015	Loan
15	Mark Randall	(England)	CM	28 September 1989 (aged 24)	Free agent	2014	Free
21	Keith Andrews	(Republic of Ireland)	DM	13 September 1980 (aged 33)	(England) Bolton Wanderers	2015	Loan
22	Samir Carruthers	(Republic of Ireland)	AM	4 April 1993 (aged 21)	(England) Aston Villa	2014	Undisclosed
26	Will Summerfield	(England)	CM	8 November 1995 (aged 18)	Academy	2014	Trainee
34	Lewis Baker	(England)	CM	25 April 1995 (aged 19)	(England) Chelsea	2015	Loan
Forwards
7	Danny Green	(England)	RW	9 July 1988 (aged 26)	Free agent	2013	Free
9	Dean Bowditch	(England)	LW	15 June 1986 (aged 28)	(England) Yeovil Town	2011	Free
11	Will Grigg	(England)	CF	3 July 1991 (aged 23)	(England) Brentford	2014	Loan
17	Daniel Powell	(England)	LW	12 March 1991 (aged 23)	Academy	2008	Trainee
19	Tom Hitchcock	(England)	CF	1 October 1992 (aged 21)	(England) Queens Park Rangers	2014	Free
27	Kabongo Tshimanga	(England)	CF	22 July 1997 (aged 17)	Academy	2014	Trainee
28	Devante Cole	(England)	CF	10 May 1995 (aged 19)	(England) Manchester City	2015	Loan
38	Rob Hall	(England)	RW	20 October 1993 (aged 20)	(England) Bolton Wanderers	2015	Loan
Out on loan
18	George Baldock	(Greece)	RB	9 March 1993 (aged 21)	Academy	2009	Trainee
20	Giorgio Rasulo	(England)	CM	23 January 1997 (aged 17)	Academy	2012	Trainee
Left club during season
23	Benik Afobe	(Democratic Republic of the Congo)	CF	12 February 1993 (aged 21)	(England) Arsenal	2014	Loan
23	Jonson Clarke-Harris	(England)	CF	21 July 1994 (aged 20)	(England) Rotherham United	2015	Loan
35	George Williams	(Wales)	LW	7 September 1995 (aged 18)	(England) Fulham	2015	Loan

== Transfers ==
=== Transfers in ===
Date from	Position	Name	From	Fee	Ref.
1 July 2014	MF	(England) Danny Green	Charlton Athletic	Free transfer	
1 July 2014	FW	(England) Tom Hitchcock	Free agent (Note: Previous club: Queens Park Rangers.)	Free transfer	
1 July 2014	DF	(England) Kyle McFadzean	Crawley Town	Undisclosed	
6 August 2014	MF	(Republic of Ireland) Samir Carruthers	Aston Villa	Undisclosed	
21 August 2014	DF	(England) Jordan Spence	Free agent (Note: Previous club: West Ham United.)	Free transfer	
26 September 2014	MF	(England) Carl Baker	Free agent (Note: Previous club: Coventry City.)	Free transfer	

=== Transfers out ===
Date from	Position	Name	To	Fee	Ref.
1 July 2014	MF	(England) Luke Chadwick	Cambridge United	Free transfer	
1 July 2014	MF	(Republic of Ireland) Stephen Gleeson	Birmingham City	Free transfer	
1 July 2014	FW	(England) Ryan Hall	Rotherham United	Free transfer	
1 July 2014	FW	(England) Izale McLeod	Crawley Town	Free transfer	
1 July 2014	MF	(England) Alan Smith	Notts County	Free transfer	
2 August 2014	DF	(England) Brendan Galloway	Everton	Undisclosed	
2 February 2015	MF	(England) Dele Alli	Tottenham Hotspur	£5,000,000 (Note: Plus add-ons and loan back until end of season.)	

=== Loans in ===
Start date	Position	Name	From	End date	Ref.
18 July 2014	FW	(Northern Ireland) Will Grigg	Brentford	End of season	
4 August 2014	FW	(England) Benik Afobe	Arsenal	End of season	
16 January 2015	FW	(England) Jonson Clarke-Harris	Rotherham United	21 February 2015	
22 January 2015	FW	(England) Devante Cole	Manchester City	End of season	
2 February 2015	MF	(England) Dele Alli	Tottenham Hotspur	End of season	
2 February 2015	MF	(Republic of Ireland) Keith Andrews	Bolton Wanderers	End of season	
16 February 2015	FW	(Wales) George C Williams	Fulham	March 2015 (Note: Recalled due to injury. Originally until end of season.)	
25 February 2015	MF	(England) Lewis Baker	Chelsea	End of season	
2 March 2015	DF	(Wales) Joe Walsh	Crawley Town	End of season	
26 March 2015	FW	(England) Rob Hall	Bolton Wanderers	End of season	

=== Loans out ===
Start date	Position	Name	To	End date	Ref.
31 October 2014	FW	(England) Tom Hitchcock	Fleetwood Town	28 December 2014	
9 January 2015	DF	(Northern Ireland) Tom Flanagan	Plymouth Argyle	10 February 2015	
12 February 2015	DF	(England) George Baldock	Oxford United	End of season	
19 February 2015	MF	(England) Giorgio Rasulo	Oxford United	26 March 2015 (Note: Recalled. Originally until end of season.)	
26 March 2015	MF	(England) Giorgio Rasulo	Aldershot Town	End of season	

== Awards ==
- PFA Team of the Year 2014–15 League One: Dele Alli
- EFL Young Player of the Year 2014–15: Dele Alli
- EFL League One Player of the Month November 2014: Carl Baker
- EFL League One Player of the Month January 2015: Dele Alli
- EFL Young Player of the Month August 2014: Dele Alli
- EFL League One Manager of the Month January 2015: Karl Robinson
- EFL League One Manager of the Month April 2015: Karl Robinson
