= Joe Walsh (footballer, born 1992) =

Welsh footballer

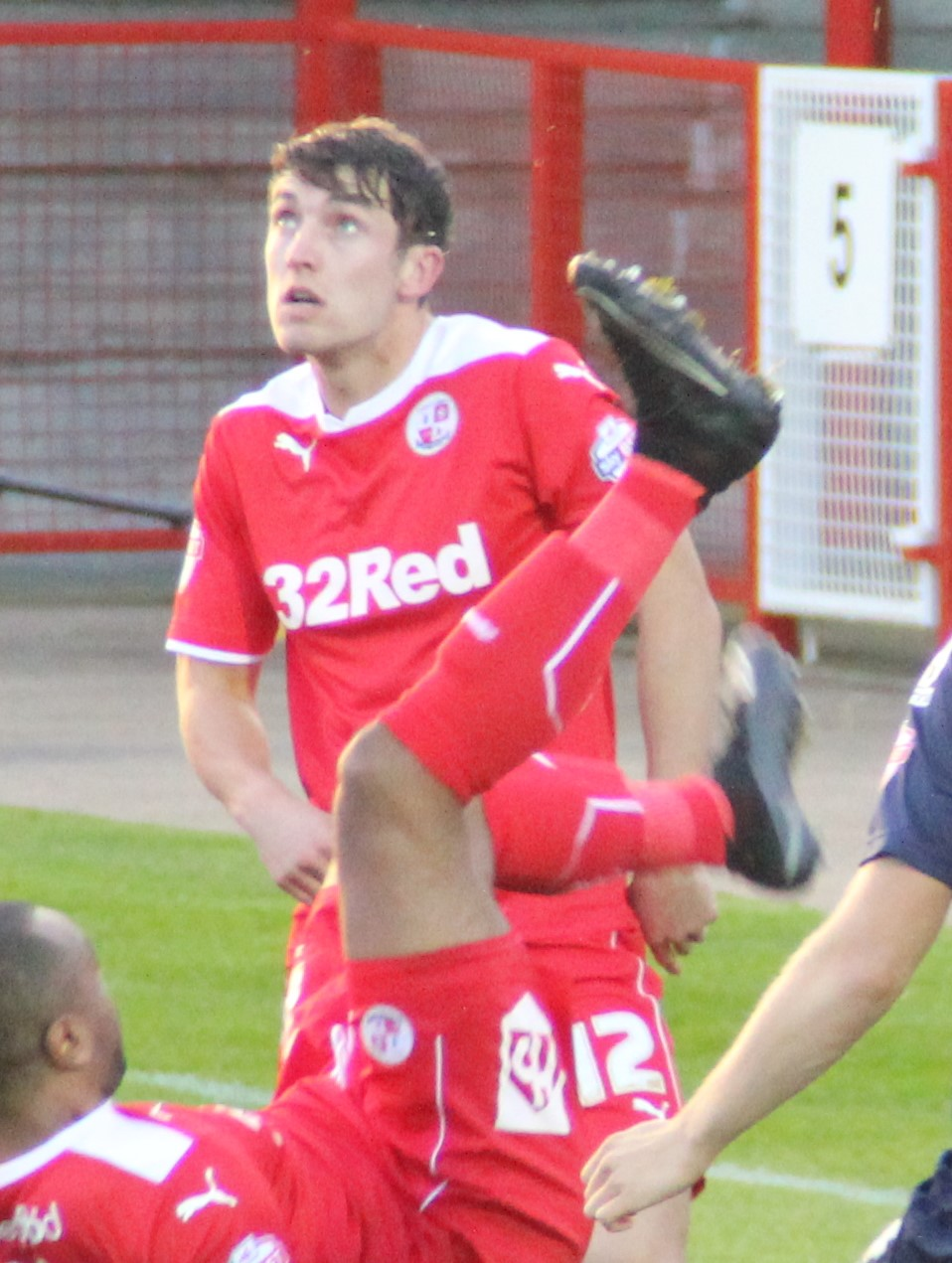
- Walsh playing for Crawley Town in 2014

Personal information
- Full name: Joseph Kevin Walsh
- Date of birth: 13 May 1992 (age 34)
- Place of birth: Cardiff, Wales
- Height: 5 ft 11 in (1.80 m)
- Position: Centre back

Youth career
- 2007–2009: Swansea City

Senior career*
Years	Team	Apps	(Gls)
2009–2012	Swansea City	0	(0)
2012–2015	Crawley Town	97	(8)
2015	→ Milton Keynes Dons (loan)	2	(0)
2015–2020	Milton Keynes Dons	121	(4)
2020–2023	Lincoln City	44	(1)
Total		264	(13)

International career
2008–2010	Wales U17	10	(1)
2010–2011	Wales U19	3	(1)
2011–2014	Wales U21	11	(0)
- * Club domestic league appearances and goals

Joseph Kevin Walsh (born 13 May 1992) is a Welsh former professional footballer who played as a defender.

He started his senior career with Swansea City but joined League One club Crawley Town in 2012, before he had made a league appearance for Swansea. After three years with Crawley, in which he made 97 appearances, he transferred to Milton Keynes Dons in 2015, and spent five years with the club. He later played for Lincoln City between 2020 and 2023.

== Club career ==
=== Swansea City ===
Walsh was born in Cardiff, South Glamorgan. He joined Swansea as an under-16 player after previously playing for Cardiff College Celts. In his first season, he helped the Swans to FAW Youth Cup glory against his hometown club, Cardiff City, at their old Ninian Park ground. He was drafted into the first-team squad for a match against Derby County for Swansea in February 2010 as cover following the late injury sustained by Garry Monk. Walsh was handed his first professional deal with the club prior to the 2010–11 season. He made his first team debut on 10 August 2010 in a 3–0 win over Barnet in the League Cup.

=== Crawley Town ===
Walsh joined Crawley Town following his release from Premier League Swansea City at the end of the 2011–12 season. He was voted the club's Player of the Year and Young Player of the Year for the 2013–14 season and ahead of the 2014–15 season was rewarded with the club captaincy. In total, Walsh made 110 appearances in all competitions for the club, and scored 9 goals.

=== Milton Keynes Dons ===
After a short spell on loan, newly promoted Championship club Milton Keynes Dons confirmed on 28 May 2015 that Walsh had signed a two-year deal at the club for an undisclosed fee. Walsh scored his first goal for Milton Keynes Dons on 16 January 2016 in a 1–0 home victory over Reading. On 18 August 2017, Walsh signed a new contract keeping him at the club until June 2020.

=== Lincoln City ===
On 13 August 2020, it was announced that Walsh would become Lincoln City's seventh signing of the summer, following the expiry of his contract with Milton Keynes Dons. He would eventually make his debut on 17 October 2020, starting the game away to Fleetwood Town helping to keep a clean sheet. After a run of 4 starts and 4 clean-sheets, Walsh would injure his knee ruling him out for up to 12 weeks. He would sign a new long-term contract, less than a year at the club on 28 March 2021. His first goal for the club came against Morecambe on 19 November 2022. On 10 May 2023, it was announced in the clubs retained list that Walsh would be leaving the club following the expiration of his contract.

== International career ==
In January 2013, Walsh was selected in the Wales U21 squad for the friendly match against Iceland on 6 February 2013. In October 2014 he was called into the Wales senior squad for the Euro 2016 qualifying matches against Bosnia-Herzegovina and Cyprus. On 8 November 2016, Walsh was called up once again to the Wales senior squad for their 2018 World Cup qualifier against Serbia.

== Career statistics ==
Appearances and goals by club, season and competition
Club	Season	League			FA Cup		League Cup		Other		Total	
Club	Season	Division	Apps	Goals	Apps	Goals	Apps	Goals	Apps	Goals	Apps	Goals
Swansea City	2010–11	Championship	0	0	0	0	1	0	—		1	0
Swansea City	2011–12	Premier League	0	0	0	0	1	0	—		1	0
Swansea City	Total		0	0	0	0	2	0	—		2	0
Crawley Town	2012–13	League One	30	2	2	0	1	0	2 (Note: Appearances in Football League Trophy.)	1	35	3
Crawley Town	2013–14	League One	39	5	3	0	1	0	0	0	43	5
Crawley Town	2014–15	League One	28	1	1	0	2	0	1	0	32	1
Crawley Town	Total		97	8	6	0	4	0	3	1	110	9
Milton Keynes Dons (loan)	2014–15	League One	2	0	0	0	0	0	0	0	2	0
Milton Keynes Dons	2015–16	Championship	18	1	3	0	1	0	—		22	1
Milton Keynes Dons	2016–17	League One	39	1	3	0	0	0	1	1	43	2
Milton Keynes Dons	2017–18	League One	10	0	3	0	1	0	2	0	16	0
Milton Keynes Dons	2018–19	League Two	30	2	1	0	1	0	1	0	33	2
Milton Keynes Dons	2019–20	League One	24	0	0	0	2	0	3	0	29	0
Milton Keynes Dons	Total		123	4	10	0	5	0	7	1	145	5
Lincoln City	2020–21	League One	21	0	1	0	—		3 (Note: Appearance(s) in League One Play-offs & Football League Trophy)	0	25	0
Lincoln City	2021–22	League One	12	0	0	0	0	0	1	0	13	0
Lincoln City	2022–23	League One	11	1	0	0	1	0	2	0	14	1
Lincoln City	Total		44	1	1	0	1	0	6	0	52	1
Career total			249	12	17	0	12	0	16	2	309	15

== Honours ==
Milton Keynes Dons

- EFL League Two third-place promotion: 2018–19

Individual

- Crawley Town Player of the Year: 2013–14
- Crawley Town Young Player of the Year: 2013–14
