= Samir Carruthers =

English footballer (born 1993)

Personal information
- Full name: Samir Badre Carruthers
- Date of birth: 4 April 1993 (age 33)
- Place of birth: Islington, England
- Height: 5 ft 8 in (1.73 m)
- Position: Midfielder

Team information
- Current team: Dulwich Hamlet

Youth career
- Cambridge United
- 2005–2009: Arsenal
- 2009–2012: Aston Villa

Senior career*
Years	Team	Apps	(Gls)
2012–2014	Aston Villa	3	(0)
2013–2014	→ Milton Keynes Dons (loan)	23	(2)
2014–2017	Milton Keynes Dons	94	(4)
2017–2019	Sheffield United	28	(1)
2018–2019	→ Oxford United (loan)	10	(0)
2019–2020	Cambridge United	10	(0)
2020–2022	Hemel Hempstead Town	26	(0)
2022	→ Dartford (loan)	6	(0)
2022–2023	Dartford	35	(10)
2023–2024	Chelmsford City	37	(3)
2024–2026	Dartford	58	(12)
2026–	Dulwich Hamlet	2	(0)

International career^{‡}
2011–2012	Republic of Ireland U19	10	(1)
2012–2013	Republic of Ireland U21	10	(3)
- * Club domestic league appearances and goals as of 22:10, 11 August 2026 (UTC) ‡ National team caps and goals as of 17:10, 20 December 2025 (UTC)

Samir Badre Carruthers (born 4 April 1993) is a semi-professional footballer who plays as a midfielder for Dulwich Hamlet. He has represented the Republic of Ireland at U19 and U21 level.

With over 160 Football League appearances, his former clubs include Aston Villa, Sheffield United, Milton Keynes Dons, Oxford United, Cambridge United, Hemel Hempstead Town, Chelmsford City and Dartford.

== Club career ==
=== Early career ===
Born in Islington, London, Carruthers was playing football local to his hometown of Hatfield, Hertfordshire when he was signed by Cambridge United's under-10 side. He trained frequently with Manchester United, but when Cambridge United abandoned their youth team set-up he signed for Arsenal, the team he supported as a child. He went on to represent Arsenal at under-18 level and captained the club's under-16 side. However, in 2009 Carruthers rejected offers from Fulham and Arsenal in favour of a move to Aston Villa.

=== Aston Villa ===
Carruthers signed for Aston Villa in June 2009, aged 16. He made his name playing for the club's reserve and academy sides as an attacking midfielder and winger. Following a number of injuries to Alex McLeish's first team squad in the latter stages of the 2011–12 season, the young midfielder was brought in to train with the first team on a number of occasions.

Carruthers made his first-team debut in Villa's 1–1 Premier League draw at Liverpool on 7 April 2012, replacing Barry Bannan for the final four minutes. He made two further substitute appearances that month.

On 1 April 2013, Carruthers captained Aston Villa's youth squad to the final of the NextGen Series where they beat Chelsea 2–0, at the Stadio Giuseppe Sinigaglia, in Como, Italy.

=== Milton Keynes Dons ===
Carruthers was sent out on loan to League One side Milton Keynes Dons on 10 August 2013 on a youth loan until 4 January 2014. He made his debut against Preston North End on 17 August. Coming on as a substitute in the 56th minute, Carruthers won a penalty, which was in turn converted by Shaun Williams, levelling the score at 2–2. A week later he scored within 15 minutes of coming on as a substitute against Bristol City, hitting a left-footed effort into the top corner to earn another 2–2 draw. On 8 January 2014, he extended his loan spell until 3 April. However, on 18 February, he withdrew from a match against Preston North End with a knee injury in the 13th minute, ending his season.

On 6 August 2014, Carruthers signed for Milton Keynes Dons on a three-year deal for an undisclosed fee. He scored his first goal of the season on 13 September in a 5–3 away win against Barnsley, and on 25 April 2015, he scored a second goal, opening a 3–2 win over Rochdale at Spotland. Eight days later the team earned their first promotion to the Championship with a 5–1 home win over Yeovil Town on the final day, with Carruthers setting up the first goal from Carl Baker.

On 19 September 2015, Carruthers received a straight red card for a foul on Stuart Dallas in a 2–1 home loss to Leeds United. He scored once in 39 appearances – opening a 3–2 loss at Blackburn Rovers on 27 February 2016 – as Milton Keynes were relegated.

=== Sheffield United ===
On 3 January 2017, it was announced that Carruthers had signed for League One leaders Sheffield United on a three-and-a-half-year deal for an undisclosed fee, thought to be worth £250,000. He made his debut four days later in a 4–2 win at Southend United, coming on as a 68th-minute substitute for Mark Duffy but lasting only 15 minutes before withdrawing with injury. He totalled 14 appearances for the Blades, who won the league title with 100 points.

Again as Duffy's replacement, Carruthers scored his first goal for the Blades on 21 November 2017 in a 5–4 loss to Fulham at Bramall Lane. He was transfer-listed by Sheffield United at the end of the 2017–18 season.

Carruthers joined Oxford United in June 2018, on loan for the 2018–19 season. He suffered a knee injury during the first game of the season, and his recovery was interrupted by a recurrence of the injury later in the autumn that required surgery.

=== Cambridge United ===
On 29 August 2019, Carruthers joined League Two side Cambridge United on a one-year deal following his release by Sheffield United. He was released by the club at the end of the season.

=== Non-League ===
Carruthers dropped down into non-league football with Hemel Hempstead Town for the start of the 2020–21 season. On 24 March 2022, he joined Dartford on loan.

On 9 June 2022, Carruthers joined Dartford on a permanent deal ahead of the 2022–23 season.

On 22 May 2023, Carruthers joined Chelmsford City on a permanent deal ahead of the 2023–24 season. On 3 May 2024, Carruthers announced he had left the club following the culmination of Chelmsford's season.

On 16 May 2024, Carruthers re-joined Dartford.

On 13 May 2025, Carruthers signed a new deal at Dartford keeping him at the club for the 2025–26 season.

On 5 July 2026, Carruthers joined Dulwich Hamlet ahead of the 2026–27 season.

== International career ==
Carruthers is of Irish, Italian and Moroccan descent and is eligible to play for Italy, Morocco, England and the Republic of Ireland, the country of his grandparents. In 2011, he made his debut for the Republic of Ireland U19 team. On 10 September 2012, Carruthers made his debut for the Republic of Ireland U21 team away to Italy.

== Controversy ==
On 15 March 2016, whilst attending the Cheltenham Festival at Cheltenham Racecourse, Carruthers and Northampton Town's James Collins were photographed urinating into a beer glass whilst standing on a balcony. The following day, Carruthers apologised for his behaviour, and following a meeting with MK Dons manager Karl Robinson and chairman Pete Winkelman he was fined two weeks' wages and suspended by the club. He pledged his fine to charities, including one chosen by the racecourse.

== Career statistics ==
As of 11 August 2026.

Appearances and goals by club, season and competition
Club	Season	League			FA Cup		League Cup		Other (Note: Includes Football League Trophy, FA Trophy, National League South play-offs, Isthmian Premier League Play-Offs, Velocity Cup, London Senior Cup and the Kent Senior Cup)		Total	
Club	Season	Division	Apps	Goals	Apps	Goals	Apps	Goals	Apps	Goals	Apps	Goals
Aston Villa	2011–12	Premier League	3	0	0	0	0	0	0	0	3	0
Aston Villa	2012–13	Premier League	0	0	0	0	0	0	0	0	0	0
Aston Villa	2013–14	Premier League	0	0	0	0	0	0	0	0	0	0
Aston Villa	Total		3	0	0	0	0	0	0	0	3	0
Milton Keynes Dons (loan)	2013–14	League One	23	2	3	0	1	0	1	0	28	2
Milton Keynes Dons	2014–15	League One	32	2	2	0	3	0	1	0	38	2
Milton Keynes Dons	2015–16	Championship	39	1	3	0	1	0	0	0	43	1
Milton Keynes Dons	2016–17	League One	23	1	1	0	1	0	3	0	28	1
Milton Keynes Dons	Total		94	4	6	0	5	0	4	0	109	4
Sheffield United	2016–17	League One	14	0	—		—		—		14	0
Sheffield United	2017–18	Championship	14	1	2	0	1	0	—		17	1
Sheffield United	Total		28	1	2	0	1	0	—		31	1
Oxford United (loan)	2018–19	League One	10	0	0	0	0	0	2	1	12	1
Cambridge United	2019–20	League Two	10	0	0	0	0	0	0	0	10	0
Hemel Hempstead Town	2020–21	National League South	6	0	0	0	—		2	0	8	0
Hemel Hempstead Town	2021–22	National League South	20	0	0	0	—		1	0	21	0
Hemel Hempstead Town	Total		26	0	0	0	0	0	3	0	29	0
Dartford (loan)	2021–22	National League South	6	0	—		—		2	0	8	0
Dartford	2022–23	National League South	35	10	1	0	—		3 (Note: One appearance in the FA Trophy) (Note: One appearance in the London Senior Cup) (Note: One appearance in the National League South Play-Offs)	0	39	10
Dartford	Total		42	10	1	0	0	0	5	0	47	10
Chelmsford City	2023–24	National League South	37	3	2	0	—		3 (Note: Two appearances in the FA Trophy) (Note: One appearance in the National League South Play-Offs)	0	42	3
Dartford	2024–25	Isthmian League Premier Division	35	10	3	0	—		4 (Note: One appearance in the FA Trophy) (Note: One appearance and one goal in the Velocity Cup) (Note: Two appearances and one goal in the Isthmian Premier League Play-Offs)	2	42	12
Dartford	2025–26	Isthmian League Premier Division	23	2	2	0	—		1 (Note: One appearance in the FA Trophy)	0	26	2
Dartford	Total		58	12	5	0	0	0	5	2	68	14
Dulwich Hamlet	2026–27	Isthmian League Premier Division	2	0	0	0	—		0	0	2	0
Career total			334	32	19	0	7	0	23	3	393	35

== Honours ==
Aston Villa U19

- NextGen Series: 2012–13

Milton Keynes Dons

- Football League One second-place promotion: 2014–15

Sheffield United

- EFL League One: 2016–17

Dartford

- Kent Senior Cup: 2021–22
