= Jordan Spence =

English footballer (born 1990)

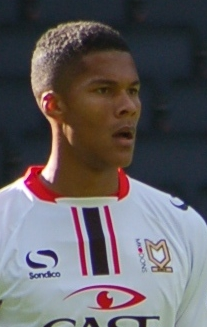
- Spence with Milton Keynes Dons in 2013

Personal information
- Full name: Jordan James Spence
- Date of birth: 24 May 1990 (age 36)
- Place of birth: Woodford, London, England
- Height: 1.80 m (5 ft 11 in)
- Position: Defender

Youth career
- 2004–2007: West Ham United

Senior career*
Years	Team	Apps	(Gls)
2007–2014	West Ham United	7	(0)
2008–2009	→ Leyton Orient (loan)	20	(0)
2009	→ Scunthorpe United (loan)	9	(0)
2011	→ Bristol City (loan)	11	(0)
2011–2012	→ Bristol City (loan)	10	(0)
2013	→ Sheffield Wednesday (loan)	4	(0)
2013–2014	→ Milton Keynes Dons (loan)	10	(1)
2014	→ Milton Keynes Dons (loan)	19	(1)
2014–2016	Milton Keynes Dons	71	(0)
2017–2019	Ipswich Town	74	(4)
2020	ADO Den Haag	4	(0)
Total		239	(6)

International career
2004–2006	England U16	8	(0)
2005–2007	England U17	30	(2)
2007–2008	England U18	2	(0)
2007–2009	England U19	9	(0)
2011	England U21	1	(0)
- * Club domestic league appearances and goals

Jordan James Spence (born 24 May 1990) is an English former professional footballer who played as a defender. Predominantly a right-back, Spence also operated as a centre-back.

Spence began his career with West Ham United, and spent time on loan at a number of clubs, including Milton Keynes Dons, who he signed for permanently in 2014. He later played two-and-a-half seasons at Ipswich Town, and had a short stint in the Eredivisie with ADO Den Haag. He has represented and captained England at various youth levels.

== Club career ==
=== West Ham United ===
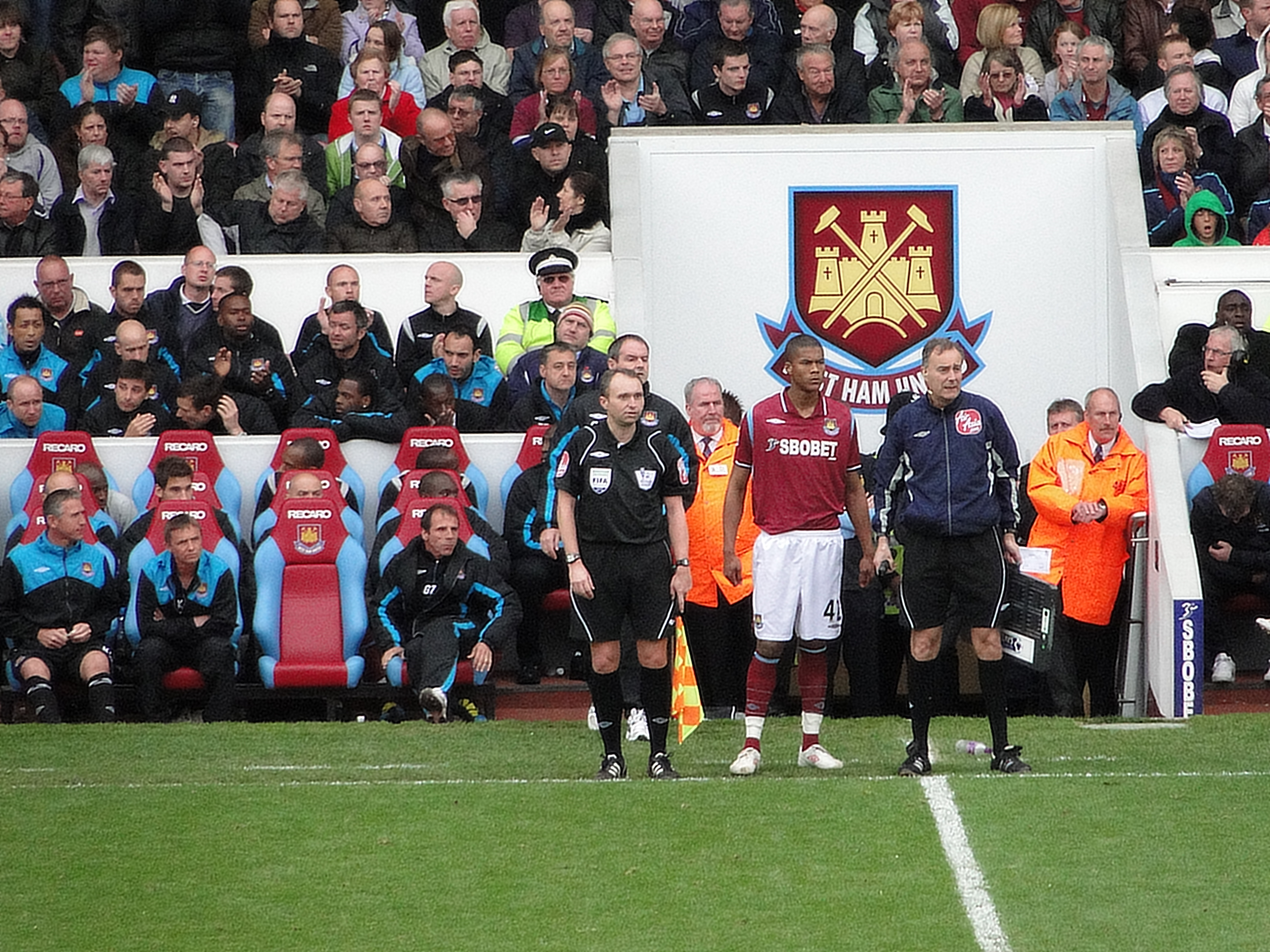
Spence making his West Ham debut, May 2010

Spence joined West Ham United in 2004. In April 2006, he signed a contract as a full-time youth team academy player for the 2006–07 season, and made his reserve team debut that same month.

On 9 May 2010, Spence made his first team debut for West Ham, coming on in the 86th minute for Alessandro Diamanti, in a 1–1 home draw against Manchester City. Spence made his first start for West Ham on 15 May 2011 in a 3–2 away defeat by Wigan Athletic, a game which saw West Ham relegated. After their relegation, Spence signed a new contract with the club, keeping him there until 2014.

In the 2012–13 season, Spence appeared in the club's first team on seven occasions, though he spent most of the season playing in the club's reserve team. Spence made his first appearance of the season in the second round of League Cup, in a 2–0 win over Crewe Alexandra on 28 August 2012, and then made his first league appearance of the season, coming on as substitute for James Tomkins in the late second-half, in a 4–1 win over Southampton on 20 October. After nine years with the club, Spence was released at the end of the 2013–14 season.

==== Leyton Orient (loan) ====
Before making his debut for West Ham, he made his professional club debut for Leyton Orient in their FA Cup second round match at Bradford City on 29 November 2008, having signed on loan on 25 November. This looked to be his only match for Leyton Orient, as he was recalled to Upton Park on 5 January 2009, but he returned to Orient on 23 January and stayed until the end of the season. His Football League debut came in the 2–1 away defeat by Scunthorpe United the following day.

==== Scunthorpe United (loan) ====
Spence signed for Scunthorpe United on a one month loan on 17 August 2009, making his debut on 18 August in a 2–0 home defeat by Middlesbrough. On 29 August, Spence's loan at Scunthorpe was extended until 1 January 2010. At the end of December 2009, his loan ended and he returned to West Ham, having played eleven times for Scunthorpe.

==== Bristol City (loan) ====
On 3 March 2011, Spence signed on a 28-day loan for Championship side Bristol City, making his debut on 5 March in the 4–1 away victory over Coventry City. On 30 March, this loan was extended until the end of the 2010–11 season. On 4 May, West Ham manager Avram Grant recalled Spence for him to provide back-up for defenders for the Premier League season run-in.

On 3 August 2011, Spence re-joined Bristol City for a season-long loan, with the option for West Ham to recall him from January 2012. Spence's first game after signing for the club on loan for the second time came in the opening game of the season, in a 3–0 loss against Ipswich Town. However, Spence's playing time was soon reduced under the management of Derek McInnes, and was an unused substitute for two matches, before being left out of the squad for three months. In April 2012, Spence returned to West Ham having played 10 games for Bristol City.

==== Sheffield Wednesday (loan) ====
On 31 August 2013, Spence signed on an emergency loan for Championship side Sheffield Wednesday. On the same day, Spence made his debut, starting in a 1–1 draw against Middlesbrough. Spence played four games for Sheffield Wednesday, before returning to West Ham at the end of September.

=== Milton Keynes Dons ===
Spence joined Milton Keynes Dons on a one-month loan on 24 October 2013. He made his debut on 26 October in a 3–2 away defeat by Tranmere Rovers. Although Spence gave away a penalty, manager Karl Robinson described Spence's debut as "wonderful". He scored his first career goal at club level on 26 November in a 3–1 away defeat by Colchester United. After playing 12 games for Milton Keynes Dons, Spence returned to West Ham in January 2014. On 30 January, Spence re-joined Milton Keynes Dons on loan until the end of the 2013–14 season. Spence's first game after signing for the club on loan for the second time, came on 1 February, in a 1–0 loss against Tranmere Rovers, the same club he played against for the first time. Spence scored for the club for the second time this season, in a 3–2 win over Stevenage on 22 March. Spence went on to finish the 2013–14 season, making twenty-nine appearances and scoring two times.

Despite interests from Championship clubs, it was announced on 21 August, that Spence joined Milton Keynes Dons on a permanent deal, signing a one-year contract with a further option of extending for another year. Spence's first game after signing for the club on a permanent basis came on 31 August, coming on as a substitute for Dean Bowditch in the 72nd minute, in a 2–0 loss against Crawley Town. During the season, Spence found himself, competing over a right-back position spot with Lee Hodson and George Baldock throughout the 2014–15 season. Despite this, Spence played 38 games for Milton Keynes Dons in the 2014–15 season as they won promotion to the Championship, as runners-up. Milton Keynes opted to take up their option of a contract extension that would ensure Spence remained under contract for the 2015–16 season.

In the 2015–16 season, Spence continued to be in the right-back position at the start of the season and continued to regain his first team place until he was suspended for a third round replay of FA Cup, in a 3–0 win over Northampton Town on 19 January 2016. After this, Spence soon lost his first team place in the right-back position, following the emergence of Baldock as the season progressed. Despite this, Spence finished the 2015–16 season, making 33 appearances, as they were relegated back to League One after a season. On 12 May, Spence was released from the club, after it was announced his contract would not be renewed.

=== Ipswich Town ===
After being rejected after his initial trial at the club during the early stages of the 2016–17 season, and then being similarly rejected by both Rotherham United and Birmingham City, on 16 January 2017, he signed a deal until the end of the season with Ipswich Town. Spence scored his first goal for the club on 15 August, a late header from a free kick, to clinch a 4–3 victory for Ipswich over Millwall. He was released at the end of the 2018–19 season.

=== ADO Den Haag ===
In January 2020, Spence joined Dutch team ADO Den Haag on a contract until the end of the 2019–20 season. He was released in July after the expiration of his contract and due to the Eredivise season being ended by the COVID-19 pandemic.

== International career ==
Spence captained the England U16s to the Victory Shield in November 2005, then led England U17 to the final of the Nordic Tournament, playing in the Faroe Islands in August 2006 and scoring in his second match. England finished at the top of their 4-team group, but lost the final to Denmark in Tórshavn.

In 2007, he was named in U17s coach John Peacock's squad for the Elite qualifying round of the Under-17 European Championships against Serbia, Bosnia and Herzegovina and Azerbaijan. Spence captained England in the 2007 FIFA U-17 World Cup, first time the country had reached the World Cup finals at this age group. Against Brazil, he scored a late winner in injury time, which put England through to the last 16; this was the first time England had beaten Brazil at a FIFA tournament.

On 20 November 2007, Spence captained the England U18 team in a 2–0 victory over Ghana. He made his first appearance for the England U19 team in their 6–0 victory over Romania, a month before, on 14 October. The England U18 team finished the 2007–08 season unbeaten, under Spence's captaincy, with a 2–0 win over Austria on 16 April 2008.

In the 2008–09 season, Spence continued to be involved with the England under-19 team, helping them to qualify for the UEFA U19 Championships in the summer of 2009, in which they finished runners up. In March 2011, Spence made his England U21 debut in a 2–1 defeat by Iceland. He has captained the England national team at every youth level.

== Personal life ==
In June 2014, he married actress Naomi Scott, after four years of dating. He met her at church, when she was 16.

== Career statistics ==
As of match played 7 March 2020

Appearances and goals by club, season and competition
Club	Season	League			FA Cup		League Cup		Other		Total	
Club	Season	Division	Apps	Goals	Apps	Goals	Apps	Goals	Apps	Goals	Apps	Goals
West Ham United	2007–08	Premier League	0	0	0	0	0	0	—		0	0
West Ham United	2008–09	Premier League	0	0	0	0	0	0	—		0	0
West Ham United	2009–10	Premier League	1	0	0	0	0	0	—		1	0
West Ham United	2010–11	Premier League	2	0	0	0	0	0	—		2	0
West Ham United	2011–12	Championship	0	0	0	0	0	0	—		0	0
West Ham United	2012–13	Premier League	4	0	1	0	2	0	—		7	0
West Ham United	2013–14	Premier League	0	0	0	0	0	0	—		0	0
West Ham United	Total		7	0	1	0	2	0	0	0	10	0
Leyton Orient (loan)	2008–09	League One	20	0	1	0	0	0	0	0	21	0
Scunthorpe United (loan)	2009–10	Championship	9	0	0	0	2	0	—		11	0
Bristol City (loan)	2010–11	Championship	11	0	0	0	0	0	—		11	0
Bristol City (loan)	2011–12	Championship	10	0	0	0	1	0	—		11	0
Sheffield Wednesday (loan)	2013–14	Championship	4	0	0	0	0	0	—		4	0
Sheffield Wednesday (loan)	Total		54	0	1	0	3	0	0	0	58	0
Milton Keynes Dons (loan)	2013–14	League One	29	2	2	0	0	0	0	0	31	2
Milton Keynes Dons	2014–15	League One	38	0	3	0	2	0	1 (Note: Appearance in Football League Trophy)	0	44	0
Milton Keynes Dons	2015–16	Championship	33	0	2	0	1	0	—		36	0
Milton Keynes Dons	Total		100	2	7	0	3	0	1	0	111	2
Ipswich Town	2016–17	Championship	17	0	0	0	0	0	—		17	0
Ipswich Town	2017–18	Championship	40	4	0	0	0	0	—		40	4
Ipswich Town	2018–19	Championship	17	0	1	0	1	0	—		19	0
Ipswich Town	Total		74	4	1	0	1	0	0	0	76	4
ADO Den Haag	2019–20	Eredivisie	4	0	0	0	—		—		4	0
Career total			239	6	10	0	9	0	1	0	259	6

== Honours ==
Milton Keynes Dons

- Football League One runner-up: 2014–15
