= Hugo Logan =

English footballer

Personal information
- Full name: Hugo James Logan
- Date of birth: 21 September 1998 (age 28)
- Place of birth: Hertfordshire, England
- Position: Midfielder

Youth career
- 2008–2017: Milton Keynes Dons

College career
Years	Team	Apps	(Gls)
2019–2021	Grand Canyon Antelopes	36	(10)

Senior career*
Years	Team	Apps	(Gls)
2017–2018	Milton Keynes Dons	0	(0)
2018	→ Hitchin Town (loan)	5	(2)
2026	Buckingham F.C.	2	(0)

International career^{‡}
2013	England U17	1	(0)
- * Club domestic league appearances and goals as of 05:00, 22 May 2022 (UTC) ‡ National team caps and goals as of 06:58, 1 January 2018 (UTC)

Hugo James Logan (born 21 September 1998) is an English former professional footballer who played as a midfielder for Grand Canyon Antelopes.

== Club career ==
=== Milton Keynes Dons ===
Logan joined Milton Keynes Dons' academy at the age of 10. Following graduation from the academy, Logan signed professional terms alongside fellow graduate Sam Nombe on 12 May 2017. On 5 June 2017, Logan was named in the League Football Education's 'The 11' for June 2017, a list highlighting the achievements of young professionals in the game.

Logan made his full professional debut for the club on 29 August 2017, featuring as a substitute in a 2–0 home win against Brighton & Hove Albion U21s in an EFL Trophy group stage fixture. During the same season, Logan went on to feature twice more in the same competition versus Stevenage and Oxford United.

On 12 February 2018, Logan joined Southern Football League Premier Division club Hitchin Town on loan for the remainder of the 2017–18 season. Following the conclusion of the season, Logan was one of several players released by Milton Keynes Dons, ending a ten-year association with the club.

=== United States ===
In 2019, Logan moved to the United States to pursue a graphic design degree at Grand Canyon University. Whilst at the university, Logan began playing college soccer for the Grand Canyon Antelopes.

== International career ==
In August 2013, Logan was called up to the England U17 national team alongside club teammate Giorgio Rasulo. On 5 August 2013, Logan made his debut for the U17 national side in a 0–1 away friendly victory over Faroe Islands U17.

== Career statistics ==
As of 19 October 2022

Club	Season	League			FA Cup		League Cup		Other		Total	
Club	Season	Division	Apps	Goals	Apps	Goals	Apps	Goals	Apps	Goals	Apps	Goals
Milton Keynes Dons	2017–18	League One	0	0	0	0	0	0	3 (Note: Appearances in 2017–18 EFL Trophy.)	0	3	0
Hitchin Town (loan)	2017–18	Southern Premier	5	2	—		—		1 (Note: Appearance in 2017–18 Southern League Cup.)	0	6	2
Sandon	2022	HSFL	1	1							1	1
Career total			6	3	0	0	0	0	4	0	10	3
