= 2017–18 Milton Keynes Dons F.C. season =

Milton Keynes Dons
2017–18 season
- Chairman: Pete Winkelman
- Manager: Robbie Neilson (until 20 January 2018); Dan Micciche (from 23 January 2018 until 22 April 2018); Keith Millen (caretaker, from 22 April 2018 until 6 June 2018); Paul Tisdale (from 6 June 2018)
- Stadium: Stadium MK
- League One: 23rd (relegated to EFL League Two)
- FA Cup: Fourth round
- EFL Cup: Second round
- EFL Trophy: Second round
- Top goalscorer: League: Chuks Aneke (9); All: Chuks Aneke (10)
- Highest home attendance: 14,925 (vs Coventry City); 27 January 2018, FA Cup R4
- Lowest home attendance: 1,541 (vs Brighton & Hove Albion U21s); 29 August 2017, EFL Trophy Group G
- Average home league attendance: 9,202
- Biggest win: 0–4 (vs Hyde United); 3 November 2017, FA Cup R1
- Biggest defeat: 5-1 (vs Wigan Athletic); 7 April 2018, League One
Home colours	Away colours	Third colours

The 2017–18 season was Milton Keynes Dons' 14th season in their existence, and their second consecutive season in League One, the third tier of English football. Along with competing in League One, the club also competed in the FA Cup, EFL Cup and EFL Trophy.

The season covers the period from 1 July 2017 to 30 June 2018.

== Competitions ==
=== League One ===
Final table

Pos	Team	Pld	W	D	L	GF	GA	GD	Pts
20	Rochdale	46	11	18	17	49	57	–8	51
21	Oldham Athletic (R)	46	11	17	18	58	75	–17	50
22	Northampton Town (R)	46	12	11	23	43	77	–34	47
23	Milton Keynes Dons (R)	46	11	12	23	43	69	–26	45
24	Bury (R)	46	8	12	26	41	71	–30	36

Source: Sky Sports

Matches

Win	Draw	Loss

Date	Opponent	Venue	Result	Scorers	Attendance	Ref
5 August 2017 – 15:00	Wigan Athletic	Home	0–1		9,164	
12 August 2017 – 15:00	Blackpool	Away	0–1		3,412	
19 August 2017 – 15:00	Gillingham	Home	1–0	Sow	7,901	
26 August 2017 – 15:00	Blackburn Rovers	Away	1–4	Upson	10,111	
2 September 2017 – 15:00	Oxford United	Home	1–1	Brittain	10,746	
9 September 2017 – 15:00	Plymouth Argyle	Away	1–0	Nesbitt	8,566	
12 September 2017 – 19:45	Peterborough United	Away	0–2		6,465	
16 September 2017 – 15:00	Rochdale	Home	3–2	Ariyibi (2), Seager	7,670	
22 September 2017 – 19:45	AFC Wimbledon	Away	2–0	Francomb (o.g.), Ariyibi	3,973	
26 September 2017 – 19:45	Northampton Town	Home	0–0		11,340	
30 September 2017 – 15:00	Bury	Away	2–0	Sow, Ebanks-Landell	3,165	
7 October 2017 – 15:00	Bradford City	Home	1–4	Ebanks-Landell	9,106	
14 October 2017 – 15:00	Portsmouth	Away	0–2		17,608	
17 October 2017 – 19:45	Walsall	Home	1–1	Aneke	7,258	
21 October 2017 – 15:00	Oldham Athletic	Home	4–4	Gilbey, Upson (2), Nesbitt	9,312	
28 October 2017 – 15:00	Bristol Rovers	Away	0–2		9,312	
11 November 2017 – 15:00	Fleetwood Town	Home	1–0	Aneke	7,827	
18 November 2017 – 15:00	Charlton Athletic	Away	2–2	Agard (2)	10,577	
21 November 2017 – 19:45	Southend United	Home	1–1	Agard	7,521	
25 November 2017 – 15:00	Doncaster Rovers	Away	1–2	Aneke	7,743	
9 December 2017 – 15:00	Shrewsbury Town	Home	1–1	Pawlett	8,355	
16 December 2017 – 15:00	Scunthorpe United	Away	2–2	Agard, Aneke	3,569	
23 December 2017 – 15:00	Rotherham United	Away	1–2	Aneke	8,333	
26 December 2017 – 15:00	Plymouth Argyle	Home	0–1		9,268	
30 December 2017 – 15:00	Peterborough United	Home	1–0	Aneke	10,304	
1 January 2018 – 15:00	Oxford United	Away	1–3	Gilbey	7,628	
13 January 2018 – 15:00	AFC Wimbledon	Home	0–0		9,504	
20 January 2018 – 15:00	Northampton Town	Away	1–2	Gilbey	7,231	
3 February 2018 – 15:00	Walsall	Away	0–1		4,009	
10 February 2018 – 15:00	Portsmouth	Home	1–2	Ugbo	14,762	
13 February 2018 – 19:45	Oldham Athletic	Away	0–1		3,381	
17 February 2018 – 15:00	Charlton Athletic	Home	1–2	Agard	8,961	
21 February 2018 – 19:45	Rochdale	Away	0–0		2,273	
24 February 2018 – 15:00	Fleetwood Town	Away	1–1	Muirhead	2,773	
3 March 2018 – 15:00	Bristol Rovers	Home	0–1		8,240	
13 March 2018 – 19:45	Rotherham United	Home	3–2	Muirhead (2), Pawlett	7,327	
17 March 2018 – 15:00	Bury	Home	2–1	Aneke (2)	9,247	
24 March 2018 – 15:00	Blackpool	Home	0–0		8,094	
29 March 2018 – 15:00	Gillingham	Away	2–1	Aneke, Williams	5,540	
2 April 2018 – 15:00	Blackburn Rovers	Home	1–2	Pawlett	11,215	
7 April 2018 – 15:00	Wigan Athletic	Away	1–5	Brittain	8,404	
14 April 2018 – 15:00	Doncaster Rovers	Home	1–2	Ugbo	8,954	
21 April 2018 – 15:00	Southend United	Away	0–4		7,546	
24 April 2018 – 19:45	Bradford City	Away	0–2		19,192	
28 April 2018 – 15:00	Scunthorpe United	Home	0–2		9,578	
5 May 2018 – 15:00	Shrewsbury Town	Away	1–0	Agard	6,516	

=== FA Cup ===
Matches

Win	Draw	Loss

Date	Round	Opponent	Venue	Result	Scorers	Attendance	Ref
3 November 2017 – 19:55	First round	Hyde United	Away	4–0	Nesbitt, Aneke, Ebanks-Landell, Upson	3,126	
2 December 2017 – 15:00	Second round	Maidstone United	Home	4–1	Nesbitt, Agard (2), Pawlett	4,804	
6 January 2018 – 15:00	Third round	Queens Park Rangers	Away	1–0	Cissé	6,314	
27 January 2018 – 15:00	Fourth round	Coventry City	Home	0–1		14,925	

=== EFL Cup ===
Matches

Win	Draw	Loss

Date	Round	Opponent	Venue	Result	Scorers	Attendance	Ref
8 August 2017 – 19:45	First round	Forest Green Rovers	Away	1–0	Ariyibi	1,608	
22 August 2017 – 19:45	Second round	Swansea City	Home	1–4	Seager	5,162	

=== EFL Trophy ===
Southern Group G Table

Pos	Div	Team	Pld	W	PW	PL	L	GF	GA	GD	Pts	Qualification
1	L1	Milton Keynes Dons (Q)	3	2	1	0	0	6	3	+3	8	Second round
2	L1	Oxford United (Q)	3	1	0	1	1	11	8	+3	4	Second round
3	L2	Stevenage (E)	3	1	0	1	1	5	7	–2	4	
4	ACA	Brighton & Hove Albion U21 (E)	3	0	1	0	2	3	7	–4	2	

Matches

Win	Draw	Loss

Date	Round	Opponent	Venue	Result	Scorers	Attendance	Ref
29 August 2017 – 19:45	Group stage	Brighton & Hove Albion U21	Home	2–0	Ariyibi, Tshibola	1,541	
3 October 2017 – 19:45	Group stage	Stevenage	Home	0–0 (Note: After 90 minutes. Milton Keynes Dons gained an extra point with a 5–4 win on penalties.)		1,793	
7 November 2017 – 19:45	Group stage	Oxford United	Away	4–3	Thomas-Asante, Ariyibi (2), Seager	1,182	
6 December 2017 – 19:45	Second round	Chelsea U23	Home	0–4		1,308	

== Player details ==
Note: Players' ages as of the club's opening fixture of the 2017–18 season.

#	Name	Nationality	Position	Date of birth (age)	Signed from	Signed in	Transfer fee	Notes
Goalkeepers
1	Lee Nicholls	(England)	GK	5 October 1992 (aged 24)	Free agent	2016	Free	
13	Wieger Sietsma	(Netherlands)	GK	11 July 1995 (aged 22)	Free agent	2017	Free	
Defenders
2	George Williams	(England)	RB	14 April 1993 (aged 24)	(England) Barnsley	2016	Free	
3	Dean Lewington	(England)	LB	18 May 1984 (aged 33)	(England) Wimbledon	2004	Free	Club Captain
4	Joe Walsh	(Wales)	CB	13 May 1992 (aged 25)	(England) Crawley Town	2015	Undisclosed	
5	Scott Wootton	(England)	CB	12 September 1991 (aged 25)	Free agent	2016	Free	
12	Scott Golbourne	(England)	LB	29 February 1988 (aged 29)	(England) Bristol City	2017	Loan	
15	Elliott Ward	(England)	CB	19 January 1985 (aged 32)	(England) Blackburn Rovers	2018	Loan	
19	Ethan Ebanks-Landell	(England)	CB	16 December 1992 (aged 24)	(England) Wolverhampton Wanderers	2017	Loan	
20	Josh Tymon	(England)	LB	22 May 1999 (aged 18)	(England) Stoke city	2018	Loan	
23	Ben Tilney	(England)	LB	28 February 1997 (aged 20)	Academy	2014	Trainee	
25	Callum Brittain	(England)	RB	12 March 1998 (aged 19)	Academy	2016	Trainee	
29	Oran Jackson	(England)	CB	16 October 1998 (aged 18)	Academy	2016	Trainee	
Midfielders
6	Ed Upson	(England)	CM	21 November 1989 (aged 27)	(England) Millwall	2016	Free	
7	Nigel Reo-Coker	(England)	DM	14 May 1984 (aged 33)	Free agent	2018	Free	
8	Ousseynou Cissé	(Mali)	DM	7 April 1991 (aged 26)	(France) Tours	2017	Free	
17	Marcus Tavernier	(England)	LM	22 March 1999 (aged 18)	(England) Middlesbrough	2018	Loan	
18	Conor McGrandles	(Scotland)	CM	21 October 1999 (aged 17)	(England) Norwich City	2017	Free	
21	Aidan Nesbitt	(Scotland)	AM	5 February 1997 (aged 20)	(Scotland) Celtic	2017	Undisclosed	
22	Giorgio Rasulo	(England)	CM	23 January 1997 (aged 20)	Academy	2012	Trainee	
24	Connor Furlong	(Scotland)	CM	7 February 1998 (aged 19)	Academy	2016	Trainee	
26	Alex Gilbey	(England)	CM	9 December 1994 (aged 22)	(England) Wigan Athletic	2017	Undisclosed	
28	Hugo Logan	(England)	AM	21 September 1998 (aged 18)	Academy	2017	Trainee	
35	David Kasumu	(Nigeria)	CM	5 October 1999 (aged 17)	Academy	2017	Trainee	
Forwards
9	Osman Sow	(Sweden)	CF	22 April 1990 (aged 27)	Free agent	2017	Free	
10	Chuks Aneke	(England)	CF	3 July 1993 (aged 24)	(Belgium) Zulte Waregem	2016	Free	
11	Peter Pawlett	(Scotland)	LW	3 February 1991 (aged 26)	(Scotland) Aberdeen	2017	Free	
14	Kieran Agard	(England)	RW	10 October 1989 (aged 27)	(England) Bristol City	2016	Undisclosed	
16	Robbie Muirhead	(Scotland)	CF	8 March 1996 (aged 21)	(Scotland) Hears	2017	Undisclosed	
27	Ike Ugbo	(Canada)	CF	21 September 1998 (aged 18)	(England) Chelsea	2018	Loan	
30	Sam Nombe	(England)	CF	22 October 1998 (aged 18)	Academy	2017	Trainee	
31	Brandon Thomas-Asante	(Ghana)	LW	29 December 1998 (aged 18)	Academy	2016	Trainee	
37	Dylan Asonganyi	(England)	CF	10 October 2000 (aged 16)	Academy	2017	Trainee	
Out on loan
Left club during season
7	Gboly Ariyibi	(United States)	RW	18 January 1995 (aged 22)	(England) Nottingham Forest	2017	Loan	
15	Ryan Seager	(England)	CF	5 February 1996 (aged 21)	(England) Southampton	2017	Loan	
17	Paul Downing	(England)	CB	26 October 1991 (aged 25)	(England) Walsall	2016	Free	
17	Aaron Tshibola	(Democratic Republic of the Congo)	CM	2 February 1995 (aged 22)	(England) Aston Villa	2017	Loan	

== Transfers ==
=== Transfers in ===
Date from	Position	Name	From	Fee	Ref.
1 July 2017	MF	(Mali) Ousseynou Cissé	(France) Tours	Free transfer	
1 July 2017	MF	(Scotland) Conor McGrandles	Norwich City	Free transfer	
1 July 2017	MF	(Scotland) Peter Pawlett	(Scotland) Aberdeen	Free transfer	
7 July 2017	GK	(Netherlands) Wieger Sietsma	Free agent (Note: Previous club: SC Heerenveen.)	Free transfer	
14 August 2017	FW	(Sweden) Osman Sow	(China) Henan Jianye	Undisclosed	
31 August 2017	MF	(England) Alex Gilbey	Wigan Athletic	Undisclosed	
31 August 2017	MF	(Scotland) Aidan Nesbitt	(Scotland) Celtic	Undisclosed	
22 March 2018	MF	(England) Nigel Reo-Coker	Free agent (Note: Previous club: IK Start.)	Free transfer	

=== Transfers out ===
Date from	Position	Name	To	Fee	Ref.
1 July 2017	DF	(England) George Baldock	Sheffield United	Undisclosed	
1 July 2017	FW	(England) Dean Bowditch	Northampton Town	Free transfer	
1 July 2017	FW	(England) Nicky Maynard	Released (Note: Joined Aberdeen on 7 July 2017.)		
1 July 2017	GK	(England) David Martin	Released (Note: Joined Millwall on 1 September 2017.)		
1 July 2017	MF	(Republic of Ireland) Darren Potter	Rotherham United	Free transfer	
1 July 2017	MF	(Northern Ireland) Ben Reeves	Released (Note: Declined new contract offer. Joined Charlton Athletic on 3 August 2017.)		
1 July 2017	FW	(England) Daniel Powell	Northampton Town	Free transfer	
8 January 2018	DF	(England) Paul Downing	Blackburn Rovers	Undisclosed	

=== Loans in ===
Start date	Position	Name	From	End date	Ref.
14 July 2017	DF	(England) Ethan Ebanks-Landell	Wolverhampton Wanderers	End of season	
17 July 2017	FW	(United States) Gboly Ariyibi	Nottingham Forest	January 2018 (Note: Recalled. Originally until end of season.)	
21 July 2017	FW	(England) Ryan Seager	Southampton	26 January 2018 (Note: Recalled. Originally until end of season.)	
27 July 2017	MF	(England) Aaron Tshibola	Aston Villa	9 November 2017 (Note: Recalled. Originally until end of season.)	
31 August 2017	DF	(England) Scott Golbourne	Bristol City	January 2018	
4 January 2018	FW	(Canada) Ike Ugbo	Chelsea	End of season	
17 January 2018	FW	(England) Marcus Tavernier	Middlesbrough	End of season	
30 January 2018	DF	(England) Josh Tymon	Stoke City	End of season	
30 January 2018	DF	(England) Elliott Ward	Blackburn Rovers	End of season	
31 January 2018	DF	(England) Scott Golbourne	Bristol City	End of season	

=== Loans out ===
Start date	Position	Name	To	End date	Ref.
31 August 2017	DF	(England) Paul Downing	Blackburn Rovers	8 January 2018 (Note: Signed permanently for Blackburn Rovers on 8 January 2018. Originally until end of season.)	

== Awards ==
- EFL Young Player of the Month (September): Callum Brittain
