= 2015–16 Milton Keynes Dons F.C. season =

Milton Keynes Dons
2015–16 season
- Chairman: Pete Winkelman
- Manager: Karl Robinson
- Stadium: Stadium MK
- Championship: 23rd (relegated to League One)
- FA Cup: Fourth round
- League Cup: Third round
- Top goalscorer: League: Nicky Maynard (6); All: Nicky Maynard (7); Josh Murphy (7)
- Highest home attendance: 28,127 (vs Chelsea); 31 January 2016, FA Cup R4
- Lowest home attendance: 5,444 (vs Leyton Orient); 11 August 2015, League Cup R1
- Average home league attendance: 13,158
- Biggest win: 1–4 (vs Rotherham United); 8 August 2015, Championship
- Biggest defeat: 0–6 (vs Southampton); 23 September 2015, League Cup R3
Home colours	Away colours	Third colours

The 2015–16 season was Milton Keynes Dons's 12th season in their existence, and their first season in the Championship, the second tier of English football, having gained promotion from League One the previous season.

Along with competing in the Championship, the club also participated in the FA Cup and League Cup.

The season covers the period from 1 July 2015 to 30 June 2016.

== Competitions ==
=== Championship ===
Final table

Pos	Team	Pld	W	D	L	GF	GA	GD	Pts
20	Fulham	46	12	15	19	66	79	–13	51
21	Rotherham United	46	13	10	23	53	71	–18	49
22	Charlton Athletic (R)	46	9	13	24	40	80	–40	40
23	Milton Keynes Dons (R)	46	9	12	25	39	69	–30	39
24	Bolton Wanderers (R)	46	5	15	26	41	81	–40	30

Source: Sky Sports

Matches

Win	Draw	Loss

Date	Opponent	Venue	Result	Scorers	Attendance	Ref
8 August 2015 – 15:00	Rotherham United	Away	4–1	Hall, Collins (o.g.), Bowditch, Baker	9,869	
15 August 2015 – 15:00	Preston North End	Home	0–1		11,035	
18 August 2015 – 19:45	Bolton Wanderers	Home	1–0	Powell	10,765	
22 August 2015 – 15:00	Reading	Away	0–0		16,547	
29 August 2015 – 15:00	Birmingham City	Home	0–2		14,626	
12 September 2015 – 15:00	Middlesbrough	Away	0–2		21,448	
15 September 2015 – 19:45	Burnley	Away	1–2	Baker	15,845	
19 September 2015 – 15:00	Leeds United	Home	1–2	Church	19,284	
26 September 2015 – 12:30	Derby County	Home	1–3	Murphy	13,554	
3 October 2015 – 15:00	Bristol City	Away	1–1	Powell	14,535	
17 October 2015 – 15:00	Blackburn Rovers	Home	3–0	Reeves (2), Church	11,548	
20 October 2015 – 19:45	Huddersfield Town	Away	0–2		11,471	
24 October 2015 – 15:00	Queens Park Rangers	Away	0–3		15,567	
31 October 2015 – 15:00	Hull City	Home	0–2		15,360	
3 November 2015 – 19:45	Charlton Athletic	Home	1–0	Bowditch	9,575	
7 November 2015 – 15:00	Brighton & Hove Albion	Away	1–2	Maynard	23,661	
21 November 2015 – 15:00	Fulham	Home	1–1	Bowditch	14,508	
28 November 2015 – 15:00	Wolverhampton Wanderers	Away	0–0		19,814	
5 December 2015 – 15:00	Brentford	Away	0–2		9,682	
12 December 2015 – 15:00	Ipswich Town	Home	0–1		13,520	
15 December 2015 – 19:45	Sheffield Wednesday	Home	2–1	Baker, Maynard	11,422	
19 December 2015 – 15:00	Nottingham Forest	Away	1–2	Murphy	19,975	
26 December 2015 – 15:00	Cardiff City	Home	2–1	Maynard, Murphy	12,510	
28 December 2015 – 15:00	Birmingham City	Away	0–1		19,714	
2 January 2016 – 15:00	Leeds United	Away	1–1	Hall	24,356	
12 January 2016 – 19:45	Burnley	Home	0–5		10,011	
16 January 2016 – 15:00	Reading	Home	1–0	Walsh	13,062	
23 January 2016 – 15:00	Bolton Wanderers	Away	1–3	Murphy	13,932	
6 February 2016 – 15:00	Cardiff City	Away	0–0		13,833	
9 February 2016 – 19:45	Middlesbrough	Home	1–1	Bowditch	11,256	
13 February 2016 – 15:00	Derby County	Away	1–0	Forster-Caskey	30,075	
20 February 2016 – 15:00	Bristol City	Home	0–2		12,825	
23 February 2016 – 19:45	Huddersfield Town	Home	1–1	Revell	9,402	
27 February 2016 – 15:00	Blackburn Rovers	Away	2–3	Carruthers, Revell	12,693	
5 March 2016 – 15:00	Queens Park Rangers	Home	2–0	Lewington, Reeves	14,796	
8 March 2016 – 19:45	Charlton Athletic	Away	0–0		13,146	
12 March 2016 – 15:00	Hull City	Away	1–1	Kay	16,183	
19 March 2016 – 15:00	Brighton & Hove Albion	Home	1–2	Kay	21,345	
2 April 2016 – 15:00	Fulham	Away	1–2	Murphy	17,588	
5 April 2016 – 19:45	Wolverhampton Wanderers	Home	1–2	Maynard	12,131	
9 April 2016 – 15:00	Rotherham United	Home	0–4		13,048	
16 April 2016 – 15:00	Preston North End	Away	1–1	Maynard	10,457	
19 April 2016 – 19:45	Sheffield Wednesday	Away	0–0		20,220	
23 April 2016 – 15:00	Brentford	Home	1–4	Maynard	11,564	
30 April 2016 – 15:00	Ipswich Town	Away	2–3	Revell	19,631	
7 May 2016 – 12:30	Nottingham Forest	Home	1–2	Maynard	15,486	

=== FA Cup ===
Matches

Win	Draw	Loss

Date	Round	Opponent	Venue	Result	Scorers	Attendance	Ref
9 January 2016 – 15:00	Third round	Northampton Town	Away	2–2	Cresswell (o.g.), Maynard	5,878	
19 January 2016 – 19:45	Third round (replay)	Northampton Town	Home	3–0	Reeves, Murphy, Church	15,133	
31 January 2016 – 16:00	Fourth round	Chelsea	Home	1–5	Potter	28,127	

=== League Cup ===
Matches

Win	Draw	Loss

Date	Round	Opponent	Venue	Result	Scorers	Attendance	Ref
11 August 2015 – 19:45	First round	Leyton Orient	Home	2–1	Baudry (o.g.), Baker	5,444	
25 August 2015 – 19:45	Second round	Cardiff City	Home	2–1 (Note: After extra time. Score 1–1 at the conclusion of 90 minutes.)	Baker, Murphy	5,617	
23 September 2015 – 19:45	Third round	Southampton	Home	0–6		10,189	

== Player details ==
Note: Players' ages as of the club's opening fixture of the 2015–16 season.

#	Name	Nationality	Position	Date of birth (age)	Signed from	Signed in	Transfer fee
Goalkeepers
1	David Martin	(England)	GK	22 January 1986 (aged 29)	(England) Liverpool	2010	Free
22	Cody Cropper	(United States)	GK	16 February 1993 (aged 22)	(England) Southampton	2016	Free
29	Charlie Burns	(England)	GK	27 May 1995 (aged 20)	Academy	2014	Trainee
Defenders
3	Dean Lewington	(England)	LB	18 May 1984 (aged 31)	(England) Wimbledon	2004	Free
4	Matthew Upson	(England)	CB	18 April 1979 (aged 36)	Free agent	2015	Free
5	Kyle McFadzean	(England)	CB	28 February 1987 (aged 28)	(England) Crawley Town	2014	Undisclosed
6	Antony Kay	(England)	CB	21 October 1982 (aged 32)	(England) Huddersfield Town	2012	Free
12	Jordan Spence	(England)	RB	24 May 1990 (aged 25)	Free agent	2014	Free
16	Joe Walsh	(Wales)	CB	13 May 1992 (aged 23)	(England) Crawley Town	2015	Undisclosed
21	George Baldock	(Greece)	RB	9 March 1993 (aged 22)	Academy	2009	Trainee
33	Oran Jackson	(England)	CB	16 October 1998 (aged 16)	Academy	2016	Trainee
24	Ben Tilney	(England)	LB	28 February 1997 (aged 18)	Academy	2014	Trainee
24	Harry Hickford	(England)	CB	23 June 1996 (aged 19)	Academy	2014	Trainee
40	Kevin Long	(Republic of Ireland)	CB	18 August 1990 (aged 24)	(England) Burnley	2016	Loan
Midfielders
7	Carl Baker	(England)	AM	26 December 1982 (aged 32)	Free agent	2014	Free
8	Darren Potter	(Republic of Ireland)	DM	21 December 1984 (aged 30)	(England) Sheffield Wednesday	2011	Free
10	Ben Reeves	(Northern Ireland)	AM	19 November 1991 (aged 23)	Free agent	2013	Free
14	Samir Carruthers	(Republic of Ireland)	AM	4 April 1993 (aged 22)	(England) Aston Villa	2014	Undisclosed
20	Giorgio Rasulo	(England)	CM	23 January 1997 (aged 18)	Academy	2012	Trainee
34	Connor Furlong	(Scotland)	CM	7 February 1998 (aged 17)	Academy	2016	Trainee
44	Jake Forster-Caskey	(England)	CM	25 April 1994 (aged 21)	(England) Brighton & Hove Albion	2016	Loan
Forwards
9	Dean Bowditch	(England)	LW	15 June 1986 (aged 29)	(England) Yeovil Town	2011	Free
13	Jay Emmanuel-Thomas	(England)	CF	27 December 1990 (aged 24)	(England) Queens Park Rangers	2016	Loan
17	Daniel Powell	(England)	LW	12 March 1991 (aged 24)	Academy	2008	Trainee
18	Alex Revell	(England)	CF	7 July 1983 (aged 32)	(Wales) Cardiff City	2016	Free
27	Kabongo Tshimanga	(England)	CF	22 July 1997 (aged 18)	Academy	2014	Trainee
28	Nicky Maynard	(England)	CF	11 December 1986 (aged 28)	Free agent	2015	Free
33	Josh Murphy	(England)	LW	24 February 1995 (aged 20)	(England) Norwich City	2015	Loan
Out on loan
2	Lee Hodson	(Northern Ireland)	RB	2 October 1991 (aged 23)	Free agent	2013	Free
11	Simon Church	(Wales)	CF	10 December 1988 (aged 26)	(England) Charlton Athletic	2015	Free
19	Tom Hitchcock	(England)	CF	1 October 1992 (aged 22)	(England) Queens Park Rangers	2014	Free
Left club during season
13	Sam Gallagher	(England)	CF	15 September 1995 (aged 19)	(England) Southampton	2015	Loan
15	Mark Randall	(England)	CM	28 September 1989 (aged 25)	Free agent	2014	Free
18	Sergio Aguza	(Spain)	CM	2 September 1992 (aged 22)	(Spain) Real Madrid Castilla	2015	Free
21	Dale Jennings	(England)	LW	21 December 1992 (aged 22)	(England) Barnsley	2015	Free
23	Cristian Benavente	(Peru)	AM	19 May 1994 (aged 21)	(Spain) Real Madrid Castilla	2015	Free
23	Jonny Williams	(Wales)	AM	9 October 1993 (aged 21)	(England) Crystal Palace	2016	Loan
26	Tom Flanagan	(Northern Ireland)	CB	21 October 1991 (aged 23)	Academy	2010	Trainee
38	Rob Hall	(England)	RW	20 October 1993 (aged 21)	(England) Bolton Wanderers	2015	Loan
39	Diego Poyet	(Uruguay)	CM	8 April 1995 (aged 20)	(England) West Ham United	2015	Loan

== Transfers ==
=== Transfers in ===
Date from	Position	Name	From	Fee	Ref.
1 July 2015	DF	(Wales) Joe Walsh	Crawley Town	Undisclosed	
1 July 2015	FW	(Wales) Simon Church	Charlton Athletic	Free transfer	
1 July 2015	GK	(United States) Cody Cropper	Southampton	Free transfer	
1 July 2015	FW	(England) Dale Jennings	Barnsley	Free transfer	
17 July 2015	MF	(Peru) Cristian Benavente	(Spain) Real Madrid Castilla	Free transfer (Note: Mutual contract termination.)	
30 July 2015	DF	(England) Matthew Upson	Free agent (Note: Previous club: Leicester City.)	Free transfer	
31 July 2015	MF	(Spain) Sergio Aguza	(Spain) Real Madrid Castilla	Free transfer (Note: Mutual contract termination.)	
22 September 2015	FW	(England) Nicky Maynard	Free agent (Note: Previous club: Cardiff City.)	Free transfer	
1 February 2016	FW	(England) Alex Revell	(Wales) Cardiff City	Free transfer (Note: Mutual contract termination.)	

=== Transfers out ===
Date from	Position	Name	To	Fee	Ref.
1 July 2015	MF	(England) Danny Green	Released (Note: Joined Luton Town on 4 July 2015.)		
25 August 2015	DF	(Northern Ireland) Tom Flanagan	Burton Albion	Free transfer (Note: Mutual contract termination.)	
5 January 2016	MF	(Peru) Cristian Benavente	Released (Note: Mutual contract termination. Joined Sporting Charleroi on 15 January 2016.)		
14 January 2016	MF	(England) Mark Randall	Barnet	Free transfer (Note: Mutual contract termination.)	
16 January 2016	MF	(Spain) Sergio Aguza	Released (Note: Mutual contract termination. Joined Ponferradina on 18 January 2016.)		

=== Loans in ===
Start date	Position	Name	From	End date	Ref.
28 July 2015	FW	(England) Rob Hall	Bolton Wanderers	5 April 2016 (Note: Recalled due to injury. Originally until end of season.)	
29 July 2015	FW	(England) Sam Gallagher	Southampton	6 January 2016 (Note: Recalled. Originally until end of season.)	
19 August 2015	MF	(Uruguay) Diego Poyet	West Ham United	3 January 2016 (Note: Recalled. Originally until end of season.)	
21 August 2015	FW	(England) Josh Murphy	Norwich City	End of season	
8 January 2016	MF	(England) Jake Forster-Caskey	Brighton & Hove Albion	End of season	
22 January 2016	MF	(Wales) Jonny Williams	Crystal Palace	April 2016	
1 February 2016	FW	(England) Jay Emmanuel-Thomas	Queens Park Rangers	End of season	
24 March 2016	DF	(Republic of Ireland) Kevin Long	Burnley	End of season	

=== Loans out ===
Start date	Position	Name	To	End date	Ref.
1 July 2015	DF	(England) George Baldock	Oxford United	28 January 2016 (Note: Recalled. Originally until end of season.)	
7 August 2015	FW	(England) Tom Hitchcock	Stevenage	October 2015 (Note: Extended. Originally until September 2015.)	
6 November 2015	MF	(England) Giorgio Rasulo	Oldham Athletic	6 January 2016	
14 January 2016	DF	(England) Harry Hickford	Dagenham & Redbridge	February 2016	
1 February 2016	FW	(Wales) Simon Church	(Scotland) Aberdeen	End of season	
1 February 2016	DF	(Northern Ireland) Lee Hodson	(Scotland) Kilmarnock	End of season	
23 February 2016	FW	(England) Tom Hitchcock	Crewe Alexandra	End of season	
