= Giorgio Rasulo =

English footballer

Personal information
- Full name: Giorgio Antonio Rasulo
- Date of birth: 23 January 1997 (age 29)
- Place of birth: Banbury, England
- Height: 5 ft 10 in (1.77 m)
- Position: Midfielder

Team information
- Current team: Chesham United
- Number: 8

Youth career
- 2006–2009: Bloxham Boys
- 2009–2012: Milton Keynes Dons

Senior career*
Years	Team	Apps	(Gls)
2012–2018	Milton Keynes Dons	13	(0)
2015	→ Oxford United (loan)	1	(0)
2015	→ Aldershot Town (loan)	4	(0)
2015–2016	→ Oldham Athletic (loan)	3	(0)
2016	→ Aldershot Town (loan)	11	(1)
2018	Brackley Town	0	(0)
2018–2023	Banbury United	42	(9)
2018–2025	St Albans City	62	(9)
2025–	Chesham United		

International career
2023–	England U16	5	(3)
2013–2014	England U17	6	(1)
- * Club domestic league appearances and goals as of 10:42, 11 August 2019 (UTC)

Giorgio Antonio Rasulo (born 23 January 1997) is an English semi-professional footballer who plays as a midfielder for National League South club Chesham United.

Rasulo has also previously represented England at U16 and U17 levels.

== Early life ==
Born in Banbury, Oxfordshire, to an English mother and an Italian father, Rasulo grew up supporting Serie A side Napoli.

Rasulo's first club as a child was Bloxham Boys FC, which he joined at the age of 9, before joining the academy at Milton Keynes Dons.

== Club career ==
=== Milton Keynes Dons ===
Rasulo quickly impressed and progressed through the academy and youth teams, being selected as captain for several age groups.

He made his debut for the Milton Keynes Dons senior team on 13 November 2012, in an FA Cup match against Cambridge City. His league debut followed on 27 April 2013 against Stevenage. Following this, Rasulo was among ten players to be offered an apprenticeships for next season. Rasulo was given the number 20 shirt for Dons' 2013–14 season and after making six appearances, on 9 May 2014, Rasulo signed his first professional contract with the club until June 2016.

In February 2015, he was loaned out to Oxford United for whom he made one substitute appearance before returning to his parent club. While at Oxford United, Rasulo was short-listed for LFE Apprentice of the Year for League One. On 26 March 2015, Rasulo joined Aldershot Town on loan until the end of the season. Rasulo made his Aldershot Town debut on 6 April 2015, in a 2–0 win over Torquay United.

In November 2015, Rasulo joined League One side Oldham Athletic on a youth loan deal. In January 2016, he returned to the Dons following the expiration of his youth loan deal with Oldham. On 8 March 2016, Rasulo rejoined National League side Aldershot Town until the end of the 2015–16 season.

Rasulo scored his first professional senior goal on 5 April 2016 in a 3–4 home defeat to Grimsby Town. Following the expiry of his loan with Aldershot Town, Rasulo returned to parent club Milton Keynes Dons. On 12 May 2016, it was announced that the club had extended Rasulo's contract after the club took up a one-year extension clause, keeping Rasulo at the club until the end of the 2016–17 season. On 30 June 2017, Rasulo signed another one-year extension to his contract with the club.

Following the conclusion of the 2017–18 season, Rasulo asked for, and was granted his release by Milton Keynes Dons, bringing his nine-year association with the club to an end.

=== Non-league ===
After briefly signing with National League North club Brackley Town, Rasulo signed for Southern Premier Central club Banbury United on 31 August 2018.

== International career ==
Rasulo represented England at the U16 level for the first time in November 2012. Rasulo's England debut came in the Victory Shield where in the final minute Rasulo curled in a goal to win the game 1–0 against Scotland U16. Rasulo then represented England at U17 level. Rasulo made his England U17 debut, in a 1–0 win over Faroe Islands U17.

== Career statistics ==
As of 7 February 2019

Appearances and goals by club, season and competition
Club	Season	League			FA Cup		League Cup		Other		Total	
Club	Season	Division	Apps	Goals	Apps	Goals	Apps	Goals	Apps	Goals	Apps	Goals
Milton Keynes Dons	2012–13	League One	1	0	2	0	0	0	0	0	3	0
Milton Keynes Dons	2013–14	League One	7	0	1	0	0	0	1 (Note: Appearance in Football League Trophy)	0	9	0
Milton Keynes Dons	2014–15	League One	0	0	1	0	0	0	0	0	1	0
Milton Keynes Dons	2015–16	Championship	1	0	—		1	0	—		2	0
Milton Keynes Dons	2016–17	League One	3	0	0	0	2	0	2 (Note: Appearance(s) in EFL Trophy)	0	7	0
Milton Keynes Dons	2017–18	League One	1	0	0	0	1	0	1	0	3	0
Milton Keynes Dons	Total		13	0	4	0	4	0	4	0	25	0
Oxford United (loan)	2014–15	League Two	1	0	—		—		—		1	0
Aldershot Town (loan)	2014–15	Conference Premier	4	0	—		—		—		4	0
Oldham Athletic (loan)	2015–16	League One	3	0	3	0	—		—		6	0
Aldershot Town (loan)	2015–16	National League	11	1	—		—		—		11	1
Brackley Town	2018–19	National League North	0	0	0	0	—		0	0	0	0
Banbury United	2018–19	Southern Premier Central	23	4	1	1	—		5 (Note: Three appearances and one goal in FA Trophy, two appearances and three goals in Southern League Cup.)	4	29	9
Career total			55	5	8	1	4	0	9	4	76	10

== Honours ==
Individual

- Milton Keynes Dons Academy Player of the Year: 2014–15
