= 2012–13 Southend United F.C. season =

Southend United F.C.
2012–13 season
- Chairman: Ron Martin
- Manager: Paul Sturrock/Phil Brown
- Stadium: Roots Hall
- League Two: 11th
- FA Cup: Third round
- League Cup: First round
- Football League Trophy: Runners-up
- Top goalscorer: League: Britt Assombalonga (6); All: Britt Assombalonga (6)
- Highest home attendance: 5,348 vs Dagenham & Redbridge, 8 September 2012
- Lowest home attendance: 1,925 vs AFC Wimbledon, 4 September 2012
- Average home league attendance: 4,339
| Home colours | Away colours |

This page shows the progress of Southend United F.C. in the 2012–13 football season. During this campaign, they played their third successive season in the fourth tier of English football, League Two.

== Squad statistics ==
=== Appearances and goals ===
As of 22 November 2012

| No. | Pos | Nat | Player | Total | | League Two | | FA Cup | | League Cup | | FL Trophy | |
| No. | Pos | Nat | Player | Apps | Goals | Apps | Goals | Apps | Goals | Apps | Goals | Apps | Goals |
|---|---|---|---|---|---|---|---|---|---|---|---|---|---|
| 1 | GK | (England) ENG | Paul Smith | 15 | 0 | 12 | 0 | 1 | 0 | 0 | 0 | 2 | 0 |
| 2 | DF | (England) ENG | Sean Clohessy | 23 | 1 | 19 | 1 | 1 | 0 | 1 | 0 | 2 | 0 |
| 3 | DF | (Grenada) GRN | Anthony Straker | 12 | 0 | 5+5 | 0 | 0 | 0 | 1 | 0 | 1 | 0 |
| 4 | MF | (England) ENG | Ryan Hall | 3 | 0 | 1+1 | 0 | 0 | 0 | 1 | 0 | 0 | 0 |
| 5 | DF | (Republic of Ireland) IRL | Graham Coughlan | 1 | 0 | 0+1 | 0 | 0 | 0 | 0 | 0 | 0 | 0 |
| 6 | DF | (England) ENG | Ryan Cresswell | 22 | 6 | 18+1 | 4 | 1 | 0 | 0 | 0 | 2 | 2 |
| 7 | FW | (Wales) WAL | Freddy Eastwood | 10 | 3 | 3+5 | 2 | 0+1 | 1 | 0+1 | 0 | 0 | 0 |
| 8 | MF | (Republic of Ireland) IRL | Michael Timlin | 19 | 0 | 16 | 0 | 1 | 0 | 0 | 0 | 2 | 0 |
| 9 | FW | (England) ENG | Neil Harris | 5 | 0 | 0+3 | 0 | 0 | 0 | 1 | 0 | 0+1 | 0 |
| 10 | FW | (Republic of Ireland) IRL | Barry Corr | 11 | 7 | 0+7 | 2 | 4 | 5 | 0 | 0 | 0 | 0 |
| 11 | MF | (England) ENG | Dave Martin | 13 | 1 | 10+2 | 1 | 0 | 0 | 0 | 0 | 1 | 0 |
| 12 | MF | (England) ENG | Jonson Clarke-Harris | 3 | 0 | 0+3 | 0 | 0 | 0 | 0 | 0 | 0 | 0 |
| 14 | MF | (England) ENG | Kevan Hurst | 21 | 2 | 17+1 | 2 | 1 | 0 | 0+1 | 0 | 1 | 0 |
| 15 | DF | (England) ENG | Mark Phillips | 16 | 2 | 12+1 | 2 | 1 | 0 | 1 | 0 | 1 | 0 |
| 16 | DF | (England) ENG | Luke Prosser | 13 | 0 | 7+2 | 0 | 0+1 | 0 | 1 | 0 | 2 | 0 |
| 17 | GK | (England) ENG | Dan Bentley | 4 | 0 | 3+1 | 0 | 0 | 0 | 0 | 0 | 0 | 0 |
| 18 | MF | (England) ENG | Ryan Leonard | 12 | 0 | 6+3 | 0 | 0+1 | 0 | 1 | 0 | 1 | 0 |
| 19 | MF | (England) ENG | John Spicer | 13 | 0 | 10+2 | 0 | 0 | 0 | 0 | 0 | 1 | 0 |
| 20 | FW | (Democratic Republic of the Congo) COD | Britt Assombalonga | 21 | 11 | 18+1 | 10 | 0 | 0 | 0 | 0 | 2 | 1 |
| 21 | FW | (England) ENG | Gavin Tomlin | 19 | 6 | 16 | 5 | 1 | 0 | 0 | 0 | 2 | 1 |
| 23 | DF | (England) ENG | Chris Barker | 22 | 0 | 16+2 | 0 | 1 | 0 | 1 | 0 | 1+1 | 0 |
| 24 | FW | (England) ENG | Elliot Benyon | 6 | 0 | 2+2 | 0 | 0 | 0 | 1 | 0 | 0+1 | 0 |
| 26 | MF | (Scotland) SCO | Marc Laird | 6 | 1 | 5 | 0 | 1 | 1 | 0 | 0 | 0 | 0 |
| 27 | DF | (Malawi) MWI | Tamika Mkandawire | 4 | 0 | 4 | 0 | 0 | 0 | 0 | 0 | 0 | 0 |
| 30 | MF | (England) ENG | Alex Woodyard | 4 | 0 | 2 | 0 | 1 | 0 | 0 | 0 | 1 | 0 |
| 31 | GK | (England) ENG | Ted Smith | 0 | 0 | 0 | 0 | 0 | 0 | 0 | 0 | 0 | 0 |
| 32 | FW | (England) ENG | Seedy Njie | 1 | 0 | 0 | 0 | 0 | 0 | 0+1 | 0 | 0 | 0 |
| | DF | (Tunisia) TUN | Bilel Mohsni | 0 | 0 | 0 | 0 | 0 | 0 | 0 | 0 | 0 | 0 |
Players who no longer play for Southend United but have made appearances this season:
| 12 | MF | (Republic of Ireland) IRL | Kane Ferdinand | 4 | 1 | 3 | 1 | 0 | 0 | 1 | 0 | 0 | 0 |
| 34 | GK | (England) ENG | Cameron Belford | 5 | 0 | 4 | 0 | 0 | 0 | 1 | 0 | 0 | 0 |

=== Top scorers ===
| Place | Position | Nation | Number | Name | League Two | FA Cup | League Cup | FL Trophy | Total |
|---|---|---|---|---|---|---|---|---|---|
| 1 | FW | (Democratic Republic of the Congo) | 20 | Britt Assombalonga | 6 | 0 | 0 | 0 | 6 |
| 2 | DF | (England) | 6 | Ryan Cresswell | 2 | 0 | 0 | 1 | 3 |
| 3 | MF | (Republic of Ireland) | 12 | Kane Ferdinand | 1 | 0 | 0 | 0 | 1 |
| = | FW | (England) | 21 | Gavin Tomlin | 0 | 0 | 0 | 1 | 1 |
| = | DF | (England) | 2 | Sean Clohessy | 1 | 0 | 0 | 0 | 0 |
| = | DF | (England) | 15 | Mark Phillips | 1 | 0 | 0 | 0 | 1 |
| = | FW | (Republic of Ireland) | 10 | Barry Corr | 1 | 0 | 0 | 0 | 1 |
| = | FW | (Wales) | 7 | Freddy Eastwood | 1 | 0 | 0 | 0 | 1 |
| | | | | TOTALS | 13 | 0 | 0 | 2 | 15 |

=== Disciplinary record ===
| Number | Nation | Position | Name | League Two | | FA Cup | | League Cup | | FL Trophy | | Total | |
| Number | Nation | Position | Name | Booked | Sent off (straight red) | Booked | Sent off (straight red) | Booked | Sent off (straight red) | Booked | Sent off (straight red) | Booked | Sent off (straight red) |
| 8 | (Republic of Ireland) | MF | Michael Timlin | 3 | 1 | 0 | 0 | 0 | 0 | 0 | 0 | 3 | 1 |
| 10 | (Republic of Ireland) | FW | Barry Corr | 0 | 1 | 0 | 0 | 0 | 0 | 0 | 0 | 0 | 1 |
| 16 | (England) | DF | Luke Prosser | 3 | 0 | 0 | 0 | 1 | 0 | 0 | 0 | 4 | 0 |
| 19 | (England) | MF | John Spicer | 3 | 0 | 0 | 0 | 0 | 0 | 0 | 0 | 3 | 0 |
| 12 | (Republic of Ireland) | MF | Kane Ferdinand | 1 | 0 | 0 | 0 | 1 | 0 | 0 | 0 | 2 | 0 |
| 4 | (England) | MF | Ryan Hall | 0 | 0 | 0 | 0 | 1 | 0 | 0 | 0 | 1 | 0 |
| 20 | (Democratic Republic of the Congo) | FW | Britt Assombalonga | 1 | 0 | 0 | 0 | 0 | 0 | 0 | 0 | 1 | 0 |
| 3 | (Grenada) | DF | Anthony Straker | 0 | 0 | 0 | 0 | 0 | 0 | 1 | 0 | 1 | 0 |
| 15 | (England) | DF | Mark Phillips | 1 | 0 | 0 | 0 | 0 | 0 | 0 | 0 | 1 | 0 |
| 11 | (England) | MF | Dave Martin | 1 | 0 | 0 | 0 | 0 | 0 | 0 | 0 | 1 | 0 |
| 18 | (England) | MF | Ryan Leonard | 1 | 0 | 0 | 0 | 0 | 0 | 0 | 0 | 1 | 0 |
| | | | TOTALS | 12 | 2 | 0 | 0 | 3 | 0 | 3 | 0 | 18 | 2 |

== Pre-season friendlies ==
Pre-season match details
| Date | Opponents | Venue | Result | Score F–A | Scorers | Attendance | Ref. |
|---|---|---|---|---|---|---|---|
| 14 July 2012 | West Ham United | Home | L | 0–3 | | 7,135 | |
| 16 July 2012 | Stambridge United XI | Away | W | 5–0 | Hyms (2), Mullings, Coker, Payne, Saggers (o.g.) | 300 | |
| 18 July 2012 | Great Wakering Rovers | Away | W | 3–2 | Prosser 21', Benyon 41', Tomlin 43' | 800 | |
| 21 July 2012 | Braintree Town | Away | W | 2–0 | Brogan 48', 50' | 920 | |
| 28 July 2012 | Real Madrid C | Away | L | 1–3 | Harris 4' | 126 | |
| 29 July 2012 | Rayo Vallecano B | Away | D | 1–1 | Eastwood 17' | 136 | |
| 31 July 2012 | Ipswich Town | Home | W | 2–1 | Ferdinand 7', Chambers 11' o.g. | 1,180 | |
| 7 August 2012 | Millwall | Home | L | 1–2 | Spicer 63' | 1,469 | |
| 8 August 2012 | Charlton Athletic | Away | L | 2–3 | Martin 20', Donnelly 40' | 0 | |
| 7 August 2011 | Tottenham Hotspur XI | Home | L | 0–6 | | 2,737 | |

== Competitions ==
=== League Two ===
==== League table ====
| Pos | Team | Pld | W | D | L | GF | GA | GD | Pts |
|---|---|---|---|---|---|---|---|---|---|
| 9 | Oxford United | 46 | 19 | 8 | 19 | 59 | 60 | −1 | 65 |
| 10 | Exeter City | 46 | 18 | 10 | 18 | 63 | 62 | +1 | 64 |
| 11 | Southend United | 46 | 16 | 13 | 17 | 61 | 55 | +6 | 61 |
| 12 | Rochdale | 46 | 16 | 13 | 17 | 68 | 70 | −2 | 61 |
| 13 | Fleetwood Town | 46 | 15 | 15 | 16 | 55 | 57 | −2 | 60 |

Updated to match(es) played on 27 April 2013. Source: BBC Sport
Rules for classification: 1) Points; 2) Goal difference; 3) Number of goals scored

==== Matches ====
League Two match details
| Date | Opponents | Venue | Result | Score F–A | Scorers | Attendance | Ref. |
|---|---|---|---|---|---|---|---|
| 18 August 2012 | Accrington Stanley | Home | L | 0–1 | | 4,673 | |
| 21 August 2012 | Oxford United | Away | L | 0–2 | | 6,001 | |
| 25 August 2012 | Northampton Town | Away | D | 3–3 | Assombalonga 57', Ferdinand 78', Cresswell 90+5' | 4,562 | |
| 1 September 2012 | Wycombe Wanderers | Home | W | 1–0 | Assombalonga 7' | 4,787 | |
| 8 September 2012 | Dagenham & Redbridge | Home | W | 3–1 | Assombalonga 18', 37', Cresswell 70' | 5,348 | |
| 15 September 2012 | Cheltenham Town | Away | W | 3–1 | Clohessy 44', Assombalonga 49', Phillips 52' | 2,751 | |
| 18 September 2012 | Gillingham | Away | L | 0–1 | | 4,920 | |
| 22 September 2012 | Exeter City | Home | W | 2–1 | Corr 78', Eastwood 88' | 4,964 | |
| 29 September 2012 | Plymouth Argyle | Away | D | 1–1 | Assombalonga 54' | 6,269 | |
| 2 October 2012 | Burton Albion | Home | L | 0–1 | | 4,150 | |
| 6 October 2012 | Barnet | Home | D | 2–2 | Eastwood 67' pen., Hurst 84' | 5,025 | |
| 13 October 2012 | Rotherham United | Home | W | 3–0 | Assombalonga 51', 65', Martin 72' | 7,328 | |
| 20 October 2012 | Morecambe | Away | L | 0–1 | | 1,643 | |
| 23 October 2012 | Aldershot Town | Home | L | 1–2 | Phillips 68' | 4,600 | |
| 27 October 2012 | York City | Home | D | 0–0 | | 5,397 | |
| 6 November 2012 | Bristol Rovers | Away | W | 3–2 | Tomlin 40', Hurst 44', Cresswell 64' | 4,721 | |
| 10 November 2012 | Port Vale | Home | D | 0–0 | | 4,876 | |
| 17 November 2012 | Torquay United | Away | W | 4–1 | Tomlin 10', 46', Assombalonga 39', 45' | 2,449 | |
| 20 November 2012 | AFC Wimbledon | Away | W | 4–0 | Tomlin 43', 67', Cresswell 61', Corr 88' | 3,753 | |
| 24 November 2012 | Rochdale | Home | W | 3–1 | Assombalonga 57', Tomlin 59', Laird 77' | 5,216 | |
| 8 December 2012 | Fleetwood Town | Away | D | 0–0 | | 2,399 | |
| 15 December 2012 | Bradford City | Home | D | 2–2 | Cresswell 80', Tomlin 90+1' | 5,142 | |
| 21 December 2012 | Chesterfield | Home | W | 3–0 | Cresswell 51', Tomlin 61', 69' | 5,273 | |
| 26 December 2012 | Dagenham & Redbridge | Away | W | 3–0 | Tomlin 1', 14', Hurst 55' | 3,555 | |
| 29 December 2012 | Burton Albion | Away | L | 0–2 | | 2,636 | |
| 1 January 2013 | Gillingham | Home | L | 0–1 | | 7,498 | |
| 12 January 2013 | Exeter City | Away | L | 0–3 | | 3,971 | |
| 26 January 2013 | Chesterfield | Away | W | 1–0 | Tomlin 83' | 4,817 | |
| 2 February 2013 | Oxford United | Home | W | 1–0 | Leonard 85' | 5,596 | |
| 9 February 2013 | Accrington Stanley | Away | D | 1–1 | Hurst 82' | 1,589 | |
| 12 February 2013 | Cheltenham Town | Home | L | 1–2 | Reeves 90+2' | 3,908 | |
| 16 February 2013 | Northampton Town | Home | L | 1–2 | Lund 65' | 5,406 | |
| 23 February 2013 | Wycombe Wanderers | Away | W | 2–1 | Corr 53', Assombalonga 85' | 3,518 | |
| 26 February 2013 | Barnet | Away | L | 0–2 | | 2,211 | |
| 2 March 2013 | Rotherham United | Home | D | 1–1 | Hurst 73' | 4,983 | |
| 9 March 2013 | Port Vale | Away | W | 2–1 | Clohessy 19' pen., Assombalonga 31' | 4,858 | |
| 12 March 2013 | AFC Wimbledon | Home | L | 1–3 | Clohessy 29' pen. | 4,236 | |
| 16 March 2013 | Torquay United | Home | D | 1–1 | Eastwood 9' | 4,891 | |
| 19 March 2013 | Plymouth Argyle | Home | L | 0–2 | | | |
| 29 March 2013 | Bradford City | Away | D | 2–2 | Tomlin 10', Assombalonga 11' | 10,598 | |
| 1 April 2013 | Fleetwood Town | Home | D | 1–1 | Corr 86' | 5,107 | |
| 10 April 2013 | Rochdale | Away | L | 2–4 | Phillips 46', Corr 90' | 1,758 | |
| 13 April 2013 | Bristol Rovers | Home | D | 0–0 | | 4,612 | |
| 16 April 2013 | Aldershot Town | Away | W | 0–2 | Corr 70', Assombalonga 78' | 2,568 | |
| 20 April 2013 | York City | Away | L | 1–2 | Leonard 22' | 5,975 | |
| 27 April 2013 | Morecambe | Home | L | 0–1 | | 5,081 | |

=== FA Cup ===
FA Cup match details
| Round | Date | Opponents | Venue | Result | Score F–A | Scorers | Attendance | Ref. |
|---|---|---|---|---|---|---|---|---|
| First round | 3 November 2012 | Stockport County | Home | W | 3–0 | Corr 33', Laird 85', Eastwood 88' | 3,084 | |
| Second round | 1 December 2012 | Bury | Away | D | 1–1 | Tomlin 41' | 2,391 | |
| Second round replay | 11 December 2012 | Bury | Home | D | 1–1 (a.e.t.) (3–2 p) | Tomlin 63' | 3,043 | |
| Third round | 5 January 2013 | Brentford | Home | D | 2–2 | Corr 39', 54' | 5,540 | |
| Third round replay | 15 January 2013 | Brentford | Away | L | 1–2 | Corr 69' | 6,526 | |

=== League Cup ===
League Cup match details
| Round | Date | Opponents | Venue | Result | Score F–A | Scorers | Attendance | Ref. |
|---|---|---|---|---|---|---|---|---|
| First round | 14 August 2012 | Peterborough United | Away | L | 0–4 | | 3,225 | |

=== Football League Trophy ===
Football League Trophy match details
| Round | Date | Opponents | Venue | Result | Score F–A | Scorers | Attendance | Ref. |
|---|---|---|---|---|---|---|---|---|
| First round | 4 September 2012 | AFC Wimbledon | Home | W | 2–1 | Tomlin 59' pen., Cresswell 90+5' | 1,925 | |
| Second round | 9 October 2012 | Dagenham & Redbridge | Home | W | 2–0 | Cresswell 17', Assombalonga 62' | 2,965 | |
| Area quarter-final | 4 December 2012 | Brentford | Home | W | 2–1 | Mkandawire 27', Hurst 39' | 3,052 | |
| Area semi-final | 8 January 2013 | Oxford United | Away | D | 3–3 (a.e.t.) (5–3 p) | Corr 6', 59', Clohessy 54' | 2,882 | |
| Area final, first leg | 5 February 2013 | Leyton Orient | Away | W | 1–0 | Leonard 57' | 5,359 | |
| Area final, second leg | 20 February 2013 | Leyton Orient | Home | D | 2–2 | Corr 61', Reeves 90' | 9,421 | |
| Final | 7 April 2013 | Crewe Alexandra | Neutral | L | 0–2 | | 43,842 | |

== Transfers ==
=== In ===
| No. | Pos. | Nat. | Name | Age | EU | Moving from | Type | Transfer window | Ends | Transfer fee | Source |
|---|---|---|---|---|---|---|---|---|---|---|---|
| 14 | MF | (England) | Kevan Hurst | 26 | EU | Walsall | Free Transfer | Summer | 2014 | Free | Southend United |
| 3 | DF | (Grenada) | Anthony Straker | 23 | EU | Aldershot Town | Transfer | Summer | 2014 | Undisclosed | Southend United |
| 21 | FW | (England) | Gavin Tomlin | 28 | EU | Dagenham & Redbridge | Free Transfer | Summer | 2013 | Free | Southend United |
| 6 | DF | (England) | Ryan Cresswell | 24 | EU | Rotherham United | Transfer | Summer | 2014 | Undisclosed | Southend United |
| 7 | FW | (Wales) | Freddy Eastwood | 28 | EU | Coventry City | Free Transfer | Summer | 2014 | Free | Southend United |
| 19 | MF | (England) | John Spicer | 28 | EU | Notts County | Free Transfer | Summer | 2013 | Free | Southend United |
| 1 | GK | (England) | Paul Smith | 25 | EU | Nottingham Forest | Transfer | Summer | 2014 | Undisclosed | Southend United |

=== Loans in ===
| No. | Pos. | Name | Country | Age | Loan club | Started | Ended | Start source | End source |
|---|---|---|---|---|---|---|---|---|---|
| 34 | GK | Belford | (England) | 23 | Bury | 14 August | 15 September | Southend United | Southend United |
| 20 | FW | Assombalonga | (Democratic Republic of the Congo) | 19 | Watford | 17 August | | Southend United | |

Sources: For loan start source see "Start source". For loan end source see "End source".
EU = if holds or not a European Union passport; Country: when 2 flags, 1st flag = country that plays for internationally, 2nd flag = country of birth; No. = number on jersey; P = Position (for position name, pause mouse pointer on abbreviation); Name = Name on jersey (for more extensive name, pause mouse pointer on name); In/Out = In: The player came in on loan, Out: The player went out on loan; Loan club = the club that the player moved on loan to or the club that the player came from on loan; Started = the date when the player's loan started; Ended = the date when the player's loan ended.

=== Out ===
| No. | Pos. | Name | Country | Age | Type | Moving to | Transfer window | Transfer fee | Apps | Goals | Source |
|---|---|---|---|---|---|---|---|---|---|---|---|
| 1 | GK | Morris | (England) | 28 | Out of Contract | Aldershot Town | Summer | Free | 64 | 0 | Southend Echo |
| 21 | FW | Sturrock | (Scotland) | 30 | Out of Contract | | Summer | Free | 41 | 0 | Southend Echo |
| 11 | MF | Sawyer | (England) | 22 | Out of Contract | Woking | Summer | Free | 27 | 0 | Southend Echo |
| 20 | FW | Crawford | (Republic of Ireland) | 20 | Out of Contract | Dartford | Summer | Free | 33 | 3 | Southend Echo |
| 31 | FW | Flood | (Republic of Ireland) | 27 | Out of Contract | St Patrick's Athletic (Republic of Ireland) | Summer | Free | 1 | 0 | Southend Echo |
| 28 | FW | Asante | (England) | 20 | Out of Contract | | Summer | Free | 1 | 0 | Southend Echo |
| 29 | MF | James-Lewis | (England) | 19 | Out of Contract | Colchester United | Summer | Free | 1 | 0 | Southend Echo |
| | MF | Smith | (England) | 19 | Out of Contract | | Summer | Free | 0 | 0 | Southend Echo |
| 25 | DF | Nesbitt | (England) | 19 | Out of Contract | | Summer | Free | 2 | 0 | Southend Echo |
| | MF | Stevens | (Northern Ireland) | 19 | Out of Contract | | Summer | Free | 1 | 0 | Southend Echo |
| | DF | Artemi | (England) | 18 | Out of Contract | Torquay United | Summer | Free | 0 | 0 | Southend Echo |
| 19 | MF | Kalala | (Democratic Republic of the Congo) | 30 | Out of Contract | | Summer | Free | 24 | 1 | Southend Echo |
| 36 | DF | Dailly | (Scotland) | 38 | Retired | | Summer | Free | 3 | 0 | Southend Echo |
| 7 | MF | Grant | (England) | 25 | Out of Contract | Stevenage | Summer | Free | 149 | 10 | Southend United |
| 3 | DF | Gilbert | (Wales) | 29 | Out of Contract | | Summer | Free | 57 | 3 | Southend Echo |
| 12 | MF | Ferdinand | (Republic of Ireland) | 19 | Transfer | Peterborough United | Summer | £200,000 | 61 | 10 | Southend United |

EU = if holds or not a European Union passport; Country: when 2 flags, 1st flag = country that plays for internationally, 2nd flag = country of birth; N = number on jersey; P = Position (for position name, pause mouse pointer on abbreviation); Name = Name on jersey (for more extensive name, pause mouse pointer on name); Age = age on the day of the signing; Moving from = only indicate the club the player was playing before start playing for this club in this season, for the type of the moving see Status column; Moving to = only indicates the club the player is going to play next, for the type of the moving see Status column; Ends = when the player's current contract ends; n/a = Not applicable; Apps = Total number of competitive appearances (including substitute appearances) at the club prior to departure; Goals = Total number of competitive goals scored at the club prior to departure.

=== Loans out ===
| No. | Pos. | Name | Country | Age | Loan club | Started | Ended | Start source | End source |
|---|---|---|---|---|---|---|---|---|---|
| | GK | Chambers | (Wales) | 18 | Bishop's Stortford | 15 August | | Southend United | |

Sources: For loan start source see "Start source". For loan end source see "End source".
EU = if holds or not a European Union passport; Country: when 2 flags, 1st flag = country that plays for internationally, 2nd flag = country of birth; No. = number on jersey; P = Position (for position name, pause mouse pointer on abbreviation); Name = Name on jersey (for more extensive name, pause mouse pointer on name); In/Out = In: The player came in on loan, Out: The player went out on loan; Loan club = the club that the player moved on loan to or the club that the player came from on loan; Started = the date when the player's loan started; Ended = the date when the player's loan ended.
