= 2011–12 Southend United F.C. season =

Southend United F.C.
2011–12 season
- Chairman: Ron Martin
- Manager: Paul Sturrock
- Stadium: Roots Hall
- League Two: 4th (Play-off Semi Final)
- FA Cup: Second round
- League Cup: First round
- FL Trophy: Regional Semi Final
- Top goalscorer: League: Bilel Mohsni (13); All: Ryan Hall (14)
- Highest home attendance: 9,782 vs. Morecambe, 15 October 2011
- Lowest home attendance: 2,053 vs. Crawley Town, 30 August 2011
- Average home league attendance: 5,712
| Home colours | Away colours |

This page shows the progress of Southend United F.C. in the 2011–12 football season. During this campaign, they played their games in the fourth tier of English football, League Two.

== League data ==
=== League table ===
| Pos | Team | Pld | W | D | L | GF | GA | GD | Pts | Promotion, qualification or relegation |
|---|---|---|---|---|---|---|---|---|---|---|
| 2 | Shrewsbury Town (P) | 46 | 26 | 10 | 10 | 66 | 41 | +25 | 88 | Promotion to Football League One |
| 3 | Crawley Town (P) | 46 | 23 | 15 | 8 | 76 | 54 | +22 | 84 | Promotion to Football League One |
| 4 | Southend United | 46 | 25 | 8 | 13 | 77 | 48 | +29 | 83 | Qualification for League Two play-offs (Note: Four teams play for one spot and promotion to Football League One.) |
| 5 | Torquay United | 46 | 23 | 12 | 11 | 63 | 50 | +13 | 81 | Qualification for League Two play-offs |
| 6 | Cheltenham Town | 46 | 23 | 8 | 15 | 66 | 50 | +16 | 77 | Qualification for League Two play-offs |

Updated to match(es) played on 5 May 2012. Source: BBC Sport
Rules for classification: 1) Points; 2) Goal difference; 3) Number of goals scored
(P) Promoted

=== League Two results round by round ===
| Round | 1 | 2 | 3 | 4 | 5 | 6 | 7 | 8 | 9 | 10 | 11 | 12 | 13 | 14 | 15 | 16 | 17 | 18 | 19 | 20 | 21 | 22 | 23 | 24 | 25 | 26 | 27 | 28 | 29 | 30 | 31 | 32 | 33 | 34 | 35 | 36 | 37 | 38 | 39 | 40 | 41 | 42 | 43 | 44 | 45 | 46 |
|---|---|---|---|---|---|---|---|---|---|---|---|---|---|---|---|---|---|---|---|---|---|---|---|---|---|---|---|---|---|---|---|---|---|---|---|---|---|---|---|---|---|---|---|---|---|---|
| Ground | H | A | A | H | A | H | A | H | H | A | H | A | H | H | A | A | H | A | H | A | H | A | A | H | H | A | A | H | A | H | A | H | A | A | H | H | A | H | A | H | A | H | A | H | A | H |
| Result | W | W | L | L | W | D | L | W | W | W | W | W | D | W | W | W | W | W | D | L | L | L | W | D | W | W | L | L | D | L | W | W | L | W | D | D | W | L | L | W | L | W | D | W | W | W |
| Position | 8 | 3 | 9 | 12 | 7 | 9 | 12 | 9 | 6 | 3 | 1 | 1 | 2 | 2 | 2 | 1 | 1 | 1 | 1 | 2 | 2 | 3 | 3 | 3 | 2 | 1 | 1 | 3 | 2 | 3 | 1 | 1 | 3 | 3 | 3 | 3 | 3 | 4 | 5 | 5 | 5 | 5 | 5 | 5 | 5 | 4 |

Updated to match(es) played on 5 May 2012. Source: southendunited.co.uk
A = Away; H = Home; W = Win; D = Draw; L = Loss

== Squad statistics ==
=== Appearances and goals ===
As of 16 May 2012

| No. | Pos | Nat | Player | Total | | League Two | | FA Cup | | League Cup | | FL Trophy | |
| No. | Pos | Nat | Player | Apps | Goals | Apps | Goals | Apps | Goals | Apps | Goals | Apps | Goals |
|---|---|---|---|---|---|---|---|---|---|---|---|---|---|
| 1 | GK | (England) ENG | Glenn Morris | 27 | 0 | 24+0 | 0 | 0+0 | 0 | 1+0 | 0 | 2+0 | 0 |
| 2 | DF | (England) ENG | Sean Clohessy | 56 | 0 | 47+0 | 0 | 4+0 | 0 | 1+0 | 0 | 4+0 | 0 |
| 3 | DF | (Wales) WAL | Peter Gilbert | 40 | 3 | 31+2 | 3 | 4+0 | 0 | 0+0 | 0 | 3+0 | 0 |
| 4 | MF | (England) ENG | Ryan Hall | 54 | 14 | 37+8 | 10 | 3+1 | 1 | 1+0 | 0 | 3+1 | 3 |
| 5 | DF | (Ireland) EIR | Graham Coughlan | 5 | 0 | 2+2 | 0 | 0+0 | 0 | 1+0 | 0 | 0+0 | 0 |
| 6 | DF | (Tunisia) TUN | Bilel Mohsni | 42 | 13 | 25+8 | 13 | 3+1 | 0 | 0+1 | 0 | 3+1 | 0 |
| 7 | MF | (England) ENG | Anthony Grant | 41 | 1 | 27+8 | 1 | 1+0 | 0 | 0+1 | 0 | 4+0 | 0 |
| 8 | MF | (Ireland) EIR | Michael Timlin | 48 | 4 | 41+1 | 4 | 4+0 | 0 | 0+0 | 0 | 2+0 | 0 |
| 9 | FW | (England) ENG | Neil Harris | 42 | 10 | 22+13 | 9 | 2+1 | 0 | 1+0 | 0 | 2+1 | 1 |
| 10 | FW | (Ireland) EIR | Barry Corr | 0 | 0 | 0+0 | 0 | 0+0 | 0 | 0+0 | 0 | 0+0 | 0 |
| 11 | MF | (England) ENG | Lee Sawyer | 14 | 0 | 5+5 | 0 | 0+0 | 0 | 0+1 | 0 | 1+2 | 0 |
| 12 | MF | (Ireland) EIR | Kane Ferdinand | 45 | 7 | 29+8 | 7 | 3+1 | 0 | 1+0 | 0 | 3+0 | 0 |
| 14 | MF | (England) ENG | Dave Martin | 17 | 3 | 11+6 | 3 | 0+0 | 0 | 0+0 | 0 | 0+0 | 0 |
| 15 | DF | (England) ENG | Mark Phillips | 46 | 8 | 39+1 | 7 | 4+0 | 0 | 1+0 | 1 | 1+0 | 0 |
| 16 | DF | (England) ENG | Luke Prosser | 27 | 1 | 19+4 | 1 | 0+1 | 0 | 1+0 | 0 | 2+0 | 0 |
| 17 | GK | (England) ENG | Dan Bentley | 1 | 0 | 0+1 | 0 | 0+0 | 0 | 0+0 | 0 | 0+0 | 0 |
| 18 | MF | (England) ENG | Ryan Leonard | 23 | 1 | 13+5 | 1 | 2+0 | 0 | 0+0 | 0 | 3+0 | 0 |
| 19 | MF | (Democratic Republic of the Congo) COD | Jean-Paul Kalala | 30 | 1 | 23+1 | 1 | 2+1 | 0 | 1+0 | 0 | 1+1 | 0 |
| 20 | FW | (Ireland) EIR | Harry Crawford | 3 | 0 | 0+3 | 0 | 0+0 | 0 | 0+0 | 0 | 0+0 | 0 |
| 21 | FW | (Scotland) SCO | Blair Sturrock | 15 | 1 | 5+4 | 0 | 1+2 | 0 | 0+0 | 0 | 3+0 | 1 |
| 22 | FW | (England) ENG | Liam Dickinson | 37 | 12 | 28+2 | 10 | 3+0 | 1 | 1+0 | 0 | 1+2 | 1 |
| 23 | DF | (England) ENG | Chris Barker | 52 | 1 | 44+1 | 1 | 4+0 | 0 | 0+0 | 0 | 3+0 | 0 |
| 24 | FW | (England) ENG | Elliot Benyon | 17 | 2 | 9+8 | 2 | 0+0 | 0 | 0+0 | 0 | 0+0 | 0 |
| 25 | DF | (England) ENG | Teddy Nesbitt | 0 | 0 | 0+0 | 0 | 0+0 | 0 | 0+0 | 0 | 0+0 | 0 |
| 27 | DF | (England) ENG | Pat Baldwin | 2 | 0 | 2+0 | 0 | 0+0 | 0 | 0+0 | 0 | 0+0 | 0 |
| 28 | FW | (England) ENG | Kyle Asante | 0 | 0 | 0+0 | 0 | 0+0 | 0 | 0+0 | 0 | 0+0 | 0 |
| 29 | MF | (England) ENG | Merrick James-Lewis | 1 | 0 | 0+1 | 0 | 0+0 | 0 | 0+0 | 0 | 0+0 | 0 |
| 30 | MF | (England) ENG | Alex Woodyard | 0 | 0 | 0+0 | 0 | 0+0 | 0 | 0+0 | 0 | 0+0 | 0 |
| 31 | FW | (Republic of Ireland) IRL | Anthony Flood | 1 | 0 | 0+1 | 0 | 0+0 | 0 | 0+0 | 0 | 0+0 | 0 |
| 34 | DF | (England) ENG | Lee Hills | 8 | 0 | 5+3 | 0 | 0+0 | 0 | 0+0 | 0 | 0+0 | 0 |
| 35 | GK | (England) ENG | Cameron Belford | 15 | 0 | 15+0 | 0 | 0+0 | 0 | 0+0 | 0 | 0+0 | 0 |
| 36 | DF | (Scotland) SCO | Christian Dailly | 3 | 0 | 3+0 | 0 | 0+0 | 0 | 0+0 | 0 | 0+0 | 0 |
| 37 | FW | (Wales) WAL | Freddy Eastwood | 9 | 2 | 7+2 | 2 | 0+0 | 0 | 0+0 | 0 | 0+0 | 0 |
Players released
| | MF | (United States) USA | Jemal Johnson | 7 | 0 | 1+4 | 0 | 0+0 | 0 | 1+0 | 0 | 0+1 | 0 |
Players featured this season for Southend United on loan before returning to parent club:
| | FW | (England) ENG | Jack Sampson | 9 | 0 | 5+4 | 0 | 0+0 | 0 | 0+0 | 0 | 0+0 | 0 |
| | GK | (England) ENG | Luke Daniels | 15 | 0 | 9+0 | 0 | 4+0 | 0 | 0+0 | 0 | 2+0 | 0 |

=== Top scorers ===
| Place | Position | Nation | Number | Name | League Two | FA Cup | League Cup | FL Trophy | Total |
|---|---|---|---|---|---|---|---|---|---|
| 1 | MF | (England) | 4 | Ryan Hall | 10 | 1 | 0 | 3 | 14 |
| 2 | DF | (Tunisia) | 6 | Bilel Mohsni | 13 | 0 | 0 | 0 | 13 |
| 3 | FW | (England) | 22 | Liam Dickinson | 10 | 1 | 0 | 1 | 12 |
| 4 | FW | (England) | 9 | Neil Harris | 9 | 0 | 0 | 1 | 10 |
| 5 | DF | (England) | 15 | Mark Phillips | 7 | 0 | 1 | 0 | 8 |
| 6 | MF | (Republic of Ireland) | 12 | Kane Ferdinand | 7 | 0 | 0 | 0 | 7 |
| 7 | MF | (Republic of Ireland) | 8 | Michael Timlin | 4 | 0 | 0 | 0 | 4 |
| 8 | MF | (England) | 14 | Dave Martin | 3 | 0 | 0 | 0 | 3 |
| = | DF | (Wales) | 3 | Peter Gilbert | 3 | 0 | 0 | 0 | 3 |
| 10 | FW | (England) | 24 | Elliot Benyon | 2 | 0 | 0 | 0 | 2 |
| = | FW | (Wales) | 37 | Freddy Eastwood | 2 | 0 | 0 | 0 | 2 |
| 12 | MF | (England) | 18 | Ryan Leonard | 1 | 0 | 0 | 0 | 1 |
| = | FW | (Scotland) | 21 | Blair Sturrock | 0 | 0 | 0 | 1 | 1 |
| = | MF | (Democratic Republic of the Congo) | 19 | Jean-Paul Kalala | 1 | 0 | 0 | 0 | 1 |
| = | DF | (England) | 16 | Luke Prosser | 1 | 0 | 0 | 0 | 1 |
| = | MF | (England) | 7 | Anthony Grant | 1 | 0 | 0 | 0 | 1 |
| = | DF | (England) | 23 | Chris Barker | 1 | 0 | 0 | 0 | 1 |
| | | | | Own goals | 4 | 0 | 0 | 0 | 4 |
| | | | | TOTALS | 79 | 2 | 1 | 6 | 88 |

=== Disciplinary record ===
| Number | Nation | Position | Name | League Two | | FA Cup | | League Cup | | FL Trophy | | Total | |
| Number | Nation | Position | Name | Booked | Sent off (straight red) | Booked | Sent off (straight red) | Booked | Sent off (straight red) | Booked | Sent off (straight red) | Booked | Sent off (straight red) |
|---|---|---|---|---|---|---|---|---|---|---|---|---|---|
| 6 | (Tunisia) | DF | Bilel Mohsni | 7 | 1 | 2 | 1 | 1 | 0 | 0 | 0 | 10 | 2 |
| 7 | (England) | MF | Anthony Grant | 12 | 0 | 1 | 0 | 0 | 0 | 0 | 1 | 13 | 1 |
| 22 | (England) | FW | Liam Dickinson | 7 | 0 | 1 | 0 | 0 | 0 | 0 | 1 | 8 | 1 |
| 23 | (England) | DF | Chris Barker | 2 | 1 | 0 | 0 | 0 | 0 | 0 | 0 | 2 | 1 |
| 2 | (England) | DF | Sean Clohessy | 2 | 1 | 0 | 0 | 0 | 0 | 0 | 0 | 2 | 1 |
| 24 | (England) | FW | Elliot Benyon | 1 | 1 | 0 | 0 | 0 | 0 | 0 | 0 | 1 | 1 |
| 4 | (England) | MF | Ryan Hall | 8 | 0 | 2 | 0 | 0 | 0 | 1 | 0 | 11 | 0 |
| 8 | (Republic of Ireland) | MF | Michael Timlin | 8 | 0 | 2 | 0 | 0 | 0 | 0 | 0 | 10 | 0 |
| 19 | (Democratic Republic of the Congo) | MF | Jean-Paul Kalala | 7 | 0 | 0 | 0 | 0 | 0 | 0 | 0 | 7 | 0 |
| 15 | (England) | DF | Mark Phillips | 6 | 0 | 1 | 0 | 0 | 0 | 0 | 0 | 7 | 0 |
| 3 | (Wales) | DF | Peter Gilbert | 3 | 0 | 0 | 0 | 0 | 0 | 2 | 0 | 5 | 0 |
| 12 | (Republic of Ireland) | MF | Kane Ferdinand | 5 | 0 | 0 | 0 | 0 | 0 | 0 | 0 | 5 | 0 |
| 11 | (England) | MF | Lee Sawyer | 1 | 0 | 0 | 0 | 0 | 0 | 1 | 0 | 2 | 0 |
| 5 | (Republic of Ireland) | DF | Graham Coughlan | 1 | 0 | 0 | 0 | 0 | 0 | 0 | 0 | 1 | 0 |
| 14 | (United States) | MF | Jemal Johnson | 1 | 0 | 0 | 0 | 0 | 0 | 0 | 0 | 1 | 0 |
| 18 | (England) | MF | Ryan Leonard | 1 | 0 | 0 | 0 | 0 | 0 | 0 | 0 | 1 | 0 |
| 14 | (England) | MF | Dave Martin | 1 | 0 | 0 | 0 | 0 | 0 | 0 | 0 | 1 | 0 |
| 35 | (England) | GK | Cameron Belford | 1 | 0 | 0 | 0 | 0 | 0 | 0 | 0 | 1 | 0 |
| 9 | (England) | FW | Neil Harris | 1 | 0 | 0 | 0 | 0 | 0 | 0 | 0 | 1 | 0 |
| 16 | (England) | DF | Luke Prosser | 1 | 0 | 0 | 0 | 0 | 0 | 0 | 0 | 1 | 0 |
| | | | TOTALS | 75 | 4 | 9 | 1 | 1 | 0 | 4 | 2 | 89 | 7 |

== Results ==
=== Pre-season friendlies ===
| 11 July 2011 | Dartford | 0–3 | Southend United | Princes Park |
| 19:30 | | | Mohsni 60'; Harris 83'; Leonard 88' | Attendance: 778 |

| 12 July 2011 | Great Wakering Rovers | 0–5 | Southend United | Burroughs Park |
| 19:45 | | | Ricketts 22', 38', 52' (pen.); Crawford 73'; Leonard 90' |

| 16 July 2011 | Dundee | 2–0 | Southend United | Bayview Stadium |
| 15:15 | Webster 10'; Bayne 90' |

| 17 July 2011 | Southend United | 0–0 | Raith Rovers | Bayview Stadium |
| 13:00 |

| 20 July 2011 | Braintree Town | 1–1 | Southend United XI | Cressing Road |
| 19:45 | Chilaka 8' | | Leonard 42' |

| 22 July 2011 | Southend United | 1–1 | Ipswich Town | Roots Hall |
| 19:45 | Harris 66' | | Martin 15' |

| 25 July 2011 | Needham Market | 0–5 | Southend United XI | Bloomfields |
| 19:45 | | | Risser 4'; Crawford 34' (pen.); Prosser 56'; Péricard 68'; Smith 79' |

| 28 July 2011 | Southend United | 0–0 | Norwich City | Roots Hall |
| 19:45 |

| 30 July 2011 | Canvey Island | 0–0 | Southend United XI | Park Lane |
| 15:00 |

=== League Two ===
| 6 August 2011 1 | Southend United | 1–0 | Hereford United | Roots Hall, Southend-on-Sea |
| 15:00 | Mohsni 14' | Report | | Attendance: 5,105; Referee: Berry |

| 13 August 2011 2 | Accrington Stanley | 1–2 | Southend United | Crown Ground, Accrington |
| 15:00 | Procter 40'; McIntyre (yellow card) 90+3' (yellow-red card) 90+3' | Report | Dickinson 2' (pen.); Hall 67' | Attendance: 1,491; Referee: Waugh |

| 16 August 2011 3 | Crawley Town | 3–0 | Southend United | Broadfield Stadium, Crawley |
| 19:45 | Howell 56'; Tubbs 68' (pen.), 70' | Report | | Attendance: 3,220; Referee: Walton |

| 20 August 2011 4 | Southend United | 0–1 | Burton Albion | Roots Hall, Southend-on-Sea |
| 15:00 | | Report | Zola 30' | Attendance: 4,794; Referee: Tierney |

| 27 August 2011 5 | Port Vale | 2–3 | Southend United | Vale Park, Stoke-on-Trent |
| 15:00 | Loft 25', 52' (pen.) | Report | Phillips 5'; Dickinson 10'; Leonard 29' | Attendance: 4,615; Referee: Moss |

| 3 September 2011 6 | Southend United | 2–2 | Northampton Town | Roots Hall, Southend-on-Sea |
| 15:00 | Mohsni 27'; Hall 59' | Report | Akinfenwa 60'; Davies 65'; McKoy (yellow card) 90' (yellow-red card) 90+3' | Attendance: 4,805; Referee: Hooper |

| 10 September 2011 7 | Swindon Town | 2–0 | Southend United | County Ground, Swindon |
| 15:00 | Smith 38'; Kerrouche 48' | Report | | Attendance: 6,852; Referee: Mohareb |

| 13 September 2011 8 | Southend United | 1–0 | Gillingham | Roots Hall, Southend-on-Sea |
| 19:45 | Phillips 87'; Mohsni (yellow card) 54' (yellow-red card) 67' | Report | | Attendance: 4,598; Referee: Phillips |

| 17 September 2011 9 | Southend United | 2–0 | Plymouth Argyle | Roots Hall, Southend-on-Sea |
| 15:00 | Dickinson 64' (pen.); Gilbert 80' | Report | Fletcher (red card) 68' | Attendance: 4,984; Referee: Naylor |

| 24 September 2011 10 | Rotherham United | 0–4 | Southend United | Don Valley Stadium, Sheffield |
| 15:00 | | Report | Gilbert 10'; Timlin 47', 60'; Harris 64' | Attendance: 3,433; Referee: Salisbury |

| 30 September 2011 11 | Southend United | 3–0 | Shrewsbury Town | Roots Hall, Southend-on-Sea |
| 19:45 | Dickinson 27' (pen.); Phillips 90+1'; Harris 90+5' (pen.) | Report | | Attendance: 6,394; Referee: Ward |

| 8 October 2011 12 | Crewe Alexandra | 1–3 | Southend United | Alexandra Stadium, Crewe |
| 15:00 | Davis 75' | Report | Ferdinand 37'; Mohsni 88', 90+1' | Attendance: 3,808; Referee: Haywood |

| 15 October 2011 13 | Southend United | 1–1 | Morecambe | Roots Hall, Southend-on-Sea |
| 15:00 | Drummond 83' (o.g.) | Report | Jevons 53'; Jevons (red card) 74' | Attendance: 9,782; Referee: Scott |

| 22 October 2011 14 | Southend United | 4–1 | Torquay United | Roots Hall, Southend-on-Sea |
| 15:00 | Ferdinand 46', 54'; Dickinson 66'; Phillips 71' | Report | Mansell 53' | Attendance: 5,425; Referee: Deadman |

| 25 October 2011 15 | Barnet | 0–3 | Southend United | Underhill Stadium, Barnet |
| 19:45 | Dennehy (yellow card) 39' (yellow-red card) 72' | Report | Hall 17'; Mohsni 36'; Harris 85' | Attendance: 2,744; Referee: Woolmer |

| 29 October 2011 16 | Macclesfield Town | 0–2 | Southend United | Moss Rose, Macclesfield |
| 15:00 | | Report | Hall 39'; Ferdinand 62' | Attendance: 2,174; Referee: Brown |

| 5 November 2011 17 | Southend United | 2–1 | Oxford United | Roots Hall, Southend-on-Sea |
| 15:00 | Phillips 45+2'; Hall 67' | Report | Batt 62' | Attendance: 6,157; Referee: Heywood |

| 19 November 2011 18 | Dagenham & Redbridge | 2–3 | Southend United | Victoria Road, Dagenham |
| 15:00 | Montano 13'; Ogogo 49' | Report | Ferdinand 8', 64'; Dickinson 33' | Attendance: 3,259; Referee: Collins |

| 26 November 2011 19 | Southend United | 1–1 | Bristol Rovers | Roots Hall, Southend-on-Sea |
| 15:00 | Harris 66' | Report | Harrold 77' | Attendance: 6,237; Referee: Mohareb |

| 13 December 2011 20 | Cheltenham Town | 3–0 | Southend United | Whaddon Road, Cheltenham |
| 15:00 | Spencer 20'; Penn 52'; Pack 80' | Report | | Attendance: 4,304; Referee: Waugh |

| 16 December 2011 21 | Southend United | 0–1 | Bradford City | Roots Hall, Southend-on-Sea |
| 19:45 | | Report | Oliver 88' | Attendance: 5,526; Referee: Scott |

| 26 December 2011 22 | Aldershot Town | A – A | Southend United | Recreation Ground, Aldershot |
| 15:00 | Jones (red card) 40' | Report | Dickinson 7' (pen.) | Referee: Ward |

| 31 December 2011 23 | AFC Wimbledon | 1–4 | Southend United | Kingsmeadow, Kingston upon Thames |
| 15:00 | Midson 7'; Jolley (red card) 45' | Report | Hall 30'; Stuart 51' (o.g.); Phillips 64'; Harris 79' | Attendance: 4,529; Referee: Kettle |

| 2 January 2012 24 | Southend United | 1–1 | Dagenham & Redbridge | Roots Hall, Southend-on-Sea |
| 15:00 | Timlin 37' | Report | Woodall 87' | Attendance: 7,564; Referee: Coote |

| 7 January 2012 25 | Southend United | 3–0 | Port Vale | Roots Hall, Southend-on-Sea |
| 15:00 | Phillips 8'; Dickinson 29'; Owen 55' (o.g.) | Report | McDonald (yellow card) 32' (yellow-red card) 64' | Attendance: 5,269; Referee: Malone |

| 14 January 2012 26 | Northampton Town | 2–5 | Southend United | Sixfields Stadium, Northampton |
| 15:00 | Johnson 10'; Berahino 43' | Report | Martin 41'; Dickinson 65' (pen.), 85'; Mohsni 81', 90+1' | Attendance: 5,255; Referee: Sutton |

| 21 January 2012 27 | Shrewsbury Town | 2–1 | Southend United | Greenhous Meadow, Shrewsbury |
| 15:00 | Collins 53' (pen.); Grandison 82'; Morgan (red card) 28' | Report | Hall 66' | Attendance: 5,601; Referee: Whitestone |

| 31 January 2011 28 | Southend United | 1–4 | Swindon Town | Roots Hall, Southend-on-Sea |
| 19:45 | Kalala 34' | Report | Ritchie 9'; Smith 16'; Devera 37'; Bodin 55' | Attendance: 5,958; Referee: Langford |

| 4 February 2012 29 | Plymouth Argyle | 2–2 | Southend United | Home Park, Plymouth |
| 15:00 | Chadwick 86'; MacDonald 88' | Report | Timlin 1'; Martin 34' | Attendance: 6,328; Referee: Sarginson |

| 10 February 2012 30 | Southend United | 0–2 | Rotherham United | Roots Hall, Southend-on-Sea |
| 19:45 | | Report | Harrad 9'; Revell 83' | Attendance: 4,717; Referee: Williamson |

| 13 February 2012 31 | Gillingham | 1–2 | Southend United | Priestfield Stadium, Gillingham |
| 19:45 | Tomlin 87' | Report | Dickinson 10'; Martin 31' (o.g.) | Attendance: 4,441; Referee: East |

| 18 February 2012 32 | Southend United | 1–0 | Crewe Alexandra | Roots Hall, Southend-on-Sea |
| 15:00 | Mohsni 74' | Report | | Attendance: 5,645; Referee: Woolmer |

| 21 February 2012 22 | Aldershot Town | 2–0 | Southend United | Recreation Ground, Aldershot |
| 19:45 | Mekki 26'; Payne 64' (pen.) | Report | | Attendance: 2,949; Referee: Deadman |

| 25 February 2012 33 | Morecambe | 1–0 | Southend United | Globe Arena, Morecambe |
| 15:00 | Burrow 75' | Report | | Attendance: 1,971; Referee: Haywood |

| 3 March 2012 34 | Burton Albion | 0–2 | Southend United | Pirelli Stadium, Burton-on-Trent |
| 15:00 | | Report | Martin 60'; Harris 75' | Attendance: 2,424; Referee: Russell |

| 5 March 2012 35 | Southend United | 0–0 | Crawley Town | Roots Hall, Southend-on-Sea |
| 19:45 | Barker (red card) 61' | Report | | Attendance: 5,439; Referee: Swarbrick |

| 10 March 2012 36 | Southend United | 2–2 | Accrington Stanley | Roots Hall, Southend-on-Sea |
| 15:00 | Prosser 65'; Benyon 76' | Report | Devitt 41'; Amond 90+2'; Liddle (red card) 81' | Attendance: 5,954; Referee: McDermid |

| 17 March 2012 37 | Hereford United | 2–3 | Southend United | Edgar Street, Hereford |
| 15:00 | Arquin 45' (pen.); Elder 88' | Report | Harris 2'; Benyon 33'; Hall 57' | Attendance: 2,456; Referee: Malone |

| 20 March 2012 38 | Southend United | 0–1 | Aldershot Town | Roots Hall, Southend-on-Sea |
| 19:45 | | Report | Hylton 59' | Attendance: 4,580; Referee: East |

| 24 March 2012 39 | Bristol Rovers | 1–0 | Southend United | Memorial Stadium, Bristol |
| 15:00 | Harrold 86' (pen.) | Report | | Attendance: 6,258; Referee: Berry |

| 30 March 2012 40 | Southend United | 4–0 | Cheltenham Town | Roots Hall, Southend-on-Sea |
| 19:45 | Ferdinand 29'; Hall 39'; Eastwood 51'; Mohsni 67' | Report | Jombati (red card) 19' | Attendance: 6,525; Referee: Kettle |

| 6 April 2012 41 | Bradford City | 2–0 | Southend United | Valley Parade, Bradford |
| 15:00 | Hanson 38'; Fagan 54' (pen.) | Report | Clohessy (red card) 52'; Benyon (red card) 68' | Attendance: 10,859; Referee: Ilderton |

| 9 April 2012 42 | Southend United | 2–0 | AFC Wimbledon | Roots Hall, Southend-on-Sea |
| 15:00 | Eastwood 70'; Grant 90' | Report | | Attendance: 6,962; Referee: Rushton |

| 14 April 2012 43 | Torquay United | 0–0 | Southend United | Plainmoor, Torquay |
| 15:00 | | Report | | Attendance: 3,408; Referee: Heywood |

| 20 April 2012 44 | Southend United | 3–0 | Barnet | Roots Hall, Southend-on-Sea |
| 19:45 | Mohsni 11', 25', 32' | Report | | Attendance: 5,765; Referee: Scott |

| 28 April 2012 45 | Oxford United | 0–2 | Southend United | Kassam Stadium, Oxford |
| 15:00 | | Report | Hall 19'; Mohsni 31' | Attendance: 9,356; Referee: Collins |

| 5 May 2012 46 | Southend United | 2–0 | Macclesfield Town | Roots Hall, Southend-on-Sea |
| 15:00 | Gilbert 24'; Harris 90' | Report | | Attendance: 9,122; Referee: Adcock |

=== League Two play-offs ===
| 12 May 2012 SF1 | Crewe Alexandra | 1–0 | Southend United | Alexandra Stadium, Crewe |
| 17:30 | Dugdale 50' | Report | | Attendance: 7,221; Referee: Naylor |

| 16 May 2012 SF2 | Southend United | 2–2 (2–3 agg.) | Crewe Alexandra | Roots Hall, Southend-on-Sea |
| 19:45 | Harris 64'; Barker 88' | Report | Leitch-Smith 24'; Clayton 86' | Attendance: 8,190; Referee: Drysdale |

=== FA Cup ===
| 12 November 2011 Round 1 | Preston North End | 0–0 | Southend United | Deepdale, Preston |
| 15:00 | | Report | | Attendance: 6,609; Referee: Miller |

| 22 November 2011 Round 1 replay | Southend United | 1–0 | Preston North End | Roots Hall, Southend-on-Sea |
| 19:45 | Dickinson 55' | Report | | Attendance: 4,537; Referee: Deadman |

| 3 December 2011 Round 2 | Southend United | 1–1 | Oldham Athletic | Roots Hall, Southend-on-Sea |
| 15:00 | Hall 67' | Report | Wesolowski 39' | Attendance: 4,613; Referee: Webb |

| 13 December 2011 Round 2 replay | Oldham Athletic | 1–0 | Southend United | Boundary Park, Oldham |
| 19:45 | Taylor 58' | Report | Mohsni (yellow card) 22' (yellow-red card) 38' | Attendance: 4,207; Referee: Sutton |

=== League Cup ===
| 9 August 2011 Round 1 | Southend United | 1–1 (3–4 p) | Leyton Orient | Roots Hall, Southend-on-Sea |
| 19:45 | Phillips 32' | Report | Richardson 23'; Téhoué (red card) 60' | Attendance: 4,847; Referee: Graham |
| | Penalties |
| | Dickinson (penalty missed); Harris (penalty scored); Clohessy (penalty scored); Kalala (penalty missed); Hall (penalty scored) | | Omozusi (penalty scored); Daniels (penalty scored); Chorley (penalty scored); Richardson (penalty missed); Cureton (penalty scored) |

=== Football League Trophy ===
| 30 August 2011 Round 1 | Southend United | 1–0 | Crawley Town | Roots Hall, Southend-on-Sea |
| 19:45 | Dickinson 25' (pen.); Dickinson (red card) 66' | Report | | Attendance: 2,053; Referee: Miller |

| 4 October 2011 Round 2 | Dagenham & Redbridge | 1–3 | Southend United | Victoria Road, Dagenham |
| 19:45 | McCrory 66' | Report | Hall 30', 74'; Harris 90+4' | Attendance: 2,395; Referee: Stroud |

| 8 November 2011 Regional QF | Oxford United | 0–1 | Southend United | Kassam Stadium, Oxford |
| 19:45 | Brown (red card) 12'; Craddock (red card) 56' | Report | Hall 15'; Grant (red card) 56' | Attendance: 2,415; Referee: Phillips |

| 6 December 2011 Regional SF | Southend United | 1–2 | Swindon Town | Roots Hall, Southend-on-Sea |
| 19:45 | Sturrock 62' | Report | Caddis 68'; Murray 81' | Attendance: 3,981; Referee: Sheldrake |

== Transfers ==
Players transferred in
| Date | Pos. | Name | Previous club | Fee | Ref. |
|---|---|---|---|---|---|
| 9 June 2011 | FW | (England) Neil Harris | (England) Millwall | Free | |
| 1 July 2011 | MF | (United States) Jemal Johnson | (Bulgaria) Lokomotiv Sofia | Free | |
| 27 July 2011 | DF | (England) Ryan Leonard | (England) Plymouth Argyle | Free | |
| 27 July 2011 | MF | (Democratic Republic of the Congo) Jean-Paul Kalala | (England) Bristol Rovers | Free | |
| 27 July 2011 | FW | (England) Liam Dickinson | (England) Plymouth Argyle | Free | |
| 1 January 2012 | FW | (England) Elliot Benyon | (England) Swindon Town | Undisclosed | |
| 4 January 2012 | MF | (England) Dave Martin | (England) Derby County | Undisclosed | |
| 5 January 2012 | MF | (Republic of Ireland) Michael Timlin | (England) Swindon Town | Undisclosed | |
| 13 January 2012 | FW | (Republic of Ireland) Anthony Flood | (Republic of Ireland) Bohemians | Free | |
| 27 January 2012 | DF | (England) Pat Baldwin | (England) Colchester United | Free | |
| 16 March 2012 | DF | (Scotland) Christian Dailly | (England) Portsmouth | Free | |
Players transferred out
| Date | Pos. | Name | To | Fee | Ref. |
| 8 May 2011 | DF | (England) Johnny Herd | (England) Ebbsfleet United | Free | |
| 8 May 2011 | MF | (Barbados) Louie Soares | (England) Hayes & Yeading United | Free | |
| 8 May 2011 | MF | (Algeria) Adam Bouzid | (Algeria) MC El Eulma | Free | |
| 8 May 2011 | DF | (France) Miguel Comminges | (United States) Colorado Rapids | Free | |
| 8 May 2011 | GK | (England) Rhys Evans | (England) Staines Town | Free | |
| 30 June 2011 | MF | (Scotland) Craig Easton | (Scotland) Dunfermline Athletic | Free | |
| 19 December 2011 | MF | (United States) Jemal Johnson | (England) Dover Athletic | Free | |
Players loaned in
| Date from | Pos. | Name | From | Date to | Ref. |
| 30 June 2011 | MF | (France) Alassane N'Diaye | (England) Crystal Palace | 31 August 2011 | |
| 31 August 2011 | MF | (Republic of Ireland) Michael Timlin | (England) Swindon Town | 2 January 2012 | |
| 25 October 2011 | GK | (England) Luke Daniels | (England) West Bromwich Albion | 3 January 2012 | |
| 12 January 2012 | FW | (England) Jack Sampson | (England) Bolton Wanderers | 10 April 2012 | |
| 1 March 2012 | DF | (England) Lee Hills | (England) Crystal Palace | End of season | |
| 3 March 2012 | GK | (England) Cameron Belford | (England) Bury | End of season | |
| 22 March 2012 | FW | (Wales) Freddy Eastwood | (England) Coventry City | End of season | |
Players loaned out
| Date from | Pos. | Name | To | Date to | Ref. |
| 9 August 2011 | DF | (England) George Artemi | (England) Great Wakering Rovers | 30 June 2012 | |
| 9 August 2011 | MF | (Republic of Ireland) George Smith | (England) Great Wakering Rovers | 30 August 2011 | |
| 9 August 2011 | MF | (England) James Stevens | (England) Great Wakering Rovers | 30 June 2012 | |
| 9 August 2011 | MF | (England) Merrick James-Lewis | (England) Braintree Town | 19 September 2011 | |
| 9 August 2011 | FW | (Scotland) Matt Paterson | (Scotland) Hamilton Academical | 1 January 2012 | |
| 30 August 2011 | MF | (Republic of Ireland) George Smith | (England) Farnborough | 30 September 2011 | |
| 30 August 2011 | MF | (England) Alex Woodyard | (England) Farnborough | 30 September 2011 | |
| 9 September 2011 | DF | (England) Teddy Nesbitt | (England) Concord Rangers | 9 October 2011 | |
| 9 September 2011 | FW | (England) Kyle Asante | (England) Concord Rangers | 9 October 2011 | |
| 28 October 2011 | FW | (England) Kyle Asante | (England) Canvey Island | 28 November 2011 | |
| 6 January 2012 | FW | (Scotland) Matt Paterson | (England) Forest Green Rovers | 6 February 2012 | |
| 26 January 2012 | DF | (England) Teddy Nesbitt | (England) Great Wakering Rovers | 26 February 2012 | |
| 27 January 2012 | FW | (England) Kyle Asante | (England) Thurrock F.C. | 27 February 2012 | |
| 16 March 2012 | DF | (England) Pat Baldwin | (England) Exeter City | 5 May 2012 | |
| 16 March 2012 | MF | (England) Merrick James-Lewis | (England) Carshalton Athletic | 16 April 2012 | |
