= 2013 Football League Trophy final =

2013 Football League Trophy Final
- Event: 2012–13 Football League Trophy
Crewe Alexandra	Southend United
2	0
- Date: 7 April 2013
- Venue: Wembley Stadium, London
- Referee: Nigel Miller (Durham County)
- Attendance: 43,842

The 2013 Football League Trophy Final was the 30th final of the English domestic football cup competition for teams from Football Leagues One and Two, the Football League Trophy.

The final was played at Wembley Stadium in London on 7 April 2013. The match was contested between Crewe Alexandra from League One and Southend United from League Two. Crewe Alexandra won the game 2–0, following goals from Luke Murphy and Max Clayton.

== Match ==
7 April 2013
13:15 BST

Crewe Alexandra	2–0	Southend United
Murphy 6'; Clayton 49'	Report

Wembley Stadium, London
Attendance: 43,842
Referee: Nigel Miller (Durham County)

Crewe Alexandra	Southend United

GK	1	(England) Steve Phillips
RB	14	(England) Kelvin Mellor
CB	3	(England) Harry Davis
CB	5	(England) Mark Ellis
LB	2	(England) Matt Tootle
RM	11	(England) Byron Moore
CM	8	(England) Luke Murphy
CM	19	(Ghana) Abdul Osman	(yellow card) 38'
LM	31	(Australia) Bradden Inman	(substituted off) 69'
ST	7	(England) Max Clayton	(yellow card) 70'	(substituted off) 83'
ST	26	(England) Chuks Aneke	(substituted off) 90+2'
Substitutes:
GK	13	(Scotland) Alan Martin
DF	12	(England) Ollie Turton
DF	17	(Wales) George Ray		(substituted on) 90+2'
MF	27	(England) Ryan Colclough		(substituted on) 69'
ST	10	(England) A-Jay Leitch-Smith		(substituted on) 83'
Manager:
(England) Steve Davis

GK	1	(England) Paul Smith
RB	2	(England) Sean Clohessy
CB	6	(England) Ryan Cresswell
CB	16	(England) Luke Prosser
LB	23	(England) Chris Barker	(yellow card) 31'	(substituted off) 57'
RM	14	(England) Kevan Hurst	(yellow card) 71'
CM	29	(England) Tamika Mkandawire		(substituted off) 77'
CM	28	(Tunisia) Bilel Mohsni		(substituted off) 57'
LM	3	(Grenada) Anthony Straker
ST	21	(England) Gavin Tomlin
ST	20	(Democratic Republic of the Congo) Britt Assombalonga
Substitutes
GK	17	(England) Dan Bentley
DF	15	(England) Mark Phillips
MF	27	(England) Ben Reeves		(substituted on) 57'
ST	7	(Wales) Freddy Eastwood		(substituted on) 77'
ST	10	(Republic of Ireland) Barry Corr		(substituted on) 57'
Manager
(England) Phil Brown

=== Statistics ===
Statistic	Crewe	Southend
Possession	56%	44%
Shots (on target)	20 (14)	11 (7)
Corners	8	12
Fouls	2	10
