= Sean Clohessy =

English footballer (born 1986)

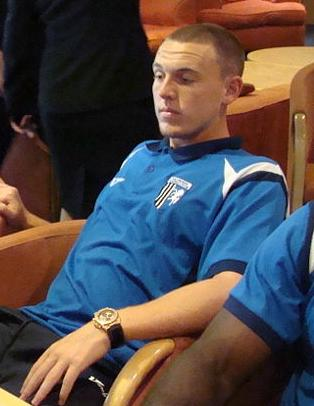
- Clohessy at Gillingham in 2008

Personal information
- Full name: Sean David Clohessy
- Date of birth: 12 December 1986 (age 39)
- Place of birth: Croydon, London, England
- Height: 1.78 m (5 ft 10 in)
- Position: Right back

Youth career
- –2005: Arsenal

Senior career*
Years	Team	Apps	(Gls)
2005–2009	Gillingham	43	(1)
2008–2009	→ Salisbury City (loan)	36	(3)
2009–2010	Salisbury City	39	(2)
2010	Bath City	0	(0)
2010–2013	Southend United	137	(4)
2013–2014	Kilmarnock	24	(2)
2014–2015	Colchester United	32	(0)
2015–2016	Leyton Orient	44	(0)
2016–2017	Braintree Town	26	(0)
2017–2018	Leatherhead	44	(1)
2018	Concord Rangers	2	(0)
2018–2020	Kingstonian		
2020–2021	East Grinstead	0	(0)
- * Club domestic league appearances and goals as of 17:41, 3 October 2020 (UTC)

Sean David Clohessy (born 12 December 1986) is an English former footballer who played as a defender.

Having risen through the Arsenal Academy, he continued his development with Gillingham, where he made his professional debut. He had a successful loan spell with Salisbury City during the 2008–09 season, and joined the club on a permanent basis the following season. After one year with the Whites, he joined league rivals Bath City, but soon left to sign a contract with Southend United.

He spent three years at Southend, making over 150 appearances in all competitions. He left the club in 2013 to join Scottish Premiership club Kilmarnock. He spent one season with Killie before returning to England to sign for Colchester United.

== Career ==
=== Gillingham ===
Born in Croydon, London, Clohessy began his career with Arsenal, where he progressed through the club's academy system. He competed with Kerrea Gilbert for the right-back position in the youth and reserve team. Clohessy moved to Gillingham in 2005 to continue his development, as he went on to make his professional debut in a Football League Trophy tie with Wycombe Wanderers on 22 November 2005. He played for 104 minutes in the match which ended 3–1 to Wycombe following a penalty shoot-out. The score after normal time was 2–2. He made his Football League debut four days later as Gillingham fell to a 5–0 defeat to Colchester United. He didn't feature for the club for one month until he came on as a half-time substitute for Jon Wallis on 26 December in a 1–1 draw with Bristol City. He scored his first professional goal on 31 December, netting the second goal in a 3–0 win over Milton Keynes Dons at Priestfield.

In early 2006, Clohessy became a regular fixture in the first-team, making 17 appearances between January and May. However, during this time he received the first red card of his career when he was sent off for violent conduct during a 3–2 win at home to Brentford on 21 March. Despite this, he was awarded a three-year professional contract in May 2006 by manager Ronnie Jepson.

Despite showing signs of promise during his first season with the Gills, Clohessy could only muster six League One appearances in his second season. He once again featured regularly in the early stages of the 2007–08 season, but fell out of favour in the new year. This was compounded when he received a red card for a second bookable offence in a 4–2 defeat to Brighton & Hove Albion on 4 March 2008. He made his final Gillingham appearance on 24 March 2008 in a 2–1 defeat to Port Vale.

==== Salisbury City (loan) ====
In September 2008, Clohessy was allowed to leave Gillingham and join Conference Premier side Salisbury City on trial. After featuring in a number of the club's reserve games, Salisbury signed him on a one-month loan contract on 18 September. He made a memorable debut for the Whites on 20 September, scoring the opening goal in a 1–1 draw with York City. Despite a winless run of games for Salisbury, Clohessy had done enough to warrant a loan extension until mid-December. He scored his second goal of the campaign on 30 October, doubling the lead in a 2–0 win over Crawley Town, ending the club's run of seven straight defeats. With the club and coach Tommy Widdrington keen to keep Clohessy until the end of the season, it was announced on 21 December that he had signed on loan until the end of the season.

Clohessy announced in March 2009 that he expected to leave Gillingham at the end of the 2008–09 season, owing to his strained relationship with Gills manager Mark Stimson. Days later, he scored the only goal of the game in a victory over Ebbsfleet United on 24 March. He made a total of 36 Conference appearances, scoring three times during his loan spell.

=== Salisbury City ===
Gillingham announced that they would not be renewing Clohessy's contract in April 2009. After a successful spell during the 2008–09 season, he signed a short-term deal with Salisbury on 29 July 2009. He made his second debut for the club on 8 August when Salisbury beat Rushden & Diamonds 2–0 at Nene Park. He scored his first of two goals of the campaign on 13 February 2010 in a 2–0 win against Grays Athletic, and the second came in a 4–1 victory at home to Altrincham on 20 April. In total, Clohessy made 40 appearances across all competitions for the Whites during the 2009–10 season. Salisbury ended the season mid-table, but were demoted after failing to exit administration. The club would start the 2010–11 season in the Southern League.

=== Bath City ===
On 6 July 2010, Clohessy signed for Bath City on a one-year contract, becoming Bath's third summer recruit from Salisbury. He followed in the footsteps of teammates Danny Webb and Luke Ruddick. However, on 13 July, it was reported that Clohessy had attracted interest from an unnamed Football League club, and Bath manager Adie Britton said that the player would be free to leave Twerton Park.

=== Southend United ===
Essex-based League Two side Southend United captured Clohessy's signature in a pre-contract agreement on 19 July 2014. With the club under a transfer embargo, he and 16 other players were registered with the Football League on the eve of their opening fixture for the 2010–11 season against Stockport County on 7 August 2010.

Clohessy made his debut for the Shrimpers in their 1–1 draw with Stockport. He received a red card for a second bookable offence in Southend's 2–0 win at Bradford City on 27 August. Despite carrying a slight groin strain, Clohessy put in some assured performances at full-back, and believed shaking off his niggling injury helped him to hit top form for his club. He scored his first Southend goal on 1 January 2011 in a 2–0 victory against Oxford United when his long, looping cross evaded Oxford goalkeeper Ryan Clarke and went in off the upright. After the game, Clohessy admitted that the goal was a fluke and that his intention had been to cross the ball.

Having ended his debut season with the club with 51 appearances to his name, manager Paul Sturrock rewarded Clohessy with a two-year contract extension to keep him at Roots Hall until 2013. In his second season with Southend, Clohessy made 54 appearances and also made two play-off appearances against Crewe Alexandra as the Shrimpers lost 3–2 on aggregate. He picked up one red card during the course of the season, once again against Bradford City after fouling Nahki Wells in the penalty area.

The 2012–13 season continued in similar fashion for Clohessy, holding down a regular starting berth as he registered his first goal of the campaign in a 3–1 win over Cheltenham Town on 15 September 2012, netting the equaliser. With that goal, he ended a 21-month-long goal drought, in which time he had played 83 matches without scoring. He played his 150th game for the Shrimpers on 16 February 2013 when they took on Northampton Town, a game which the Blues lost 2–1. He earned the captains armband from Luke Prosser who had been deputising for injured club captain Chris Barker on 2 March 2013. He then scored two goals in two games, the first in a 2–1 win against Port Vale on 9 March, and the second in a 3–1 loss to Wimbledon three days later. Clohessy also helped Southend to the 2013 Football League Trophy Final, where Southend took on Crewe at Wembley Stadium on 7 April 2013. They lost the match 2–0 as new manager Phil Brown in only his third game in charge led the team out at Wembley as former boss Paul Sturrock sat in the stands.

Following an impressive 2012–13 season, where he set a club appearance record by playing in 59 consecutive games in a single season, Clohessy was named as Southend United's Supporters' Player of the Year and the Shrimpers Trust Player of the Year. Following this, it was announced Clohessy was selected in the PFA Team of the Year for League Two, alongside teammate Ryan Cresswell.

With his contract expiring, Clohessy was offered a new contract by Phil Brown. Clohessy admitted that while wanting to play at the highest possible level, he would not ask to leave Southend. While negotiating a new contract, it was revealed that a number of League One clubs had been in talks with the player, with Clohessy weighing up his available options. He missed the start of the Blues' pre-season training, making an exit from the club look more likely. Clohessy claimed that he was not contacted by Southend United to discuss his new contract, and left the club as moves to other clubs failed to materialise, with both Ipswich Town and MK Dons reportedly interested in signing him. A spokesman for Southend claimed that the player was indeed in negotiations with the club for several months, with both verbal and written offers made and turned down.

=== Kilmarnock ===
Clohessy opted to join Scottish Premiership club Kilmarnock on a free transfer on 11 August 2013. He made his club debut on 17 August against St Mirren in a 1–1 draw, setting up Kris Boyd for Killie's goal. He provided another assist for Boyd in Kilmarnock's 1–1 draw with Partick Thistle on 21 September, before scoring his first goal for the club in a 5–2 defeat by Celtic on 28 September. He picked up his second goal of the campaign as Kilmarnock fell to a 3–1 defeat at the hands of St Johnstone on 8 November. Inconsistent performances led to Clohessy being replaced by youngster Ross Barbour in the second half of the season, and he struggled to regain his first-team position. After making 24 appearances, Clohessy was released by the club in June 2014.

=== Colchester United ===
Clohessy returned to Essex on 1 July 2014, signing a two-year deal with League One club Colchester United on a free transfer. He was named as club vice-captain to Magnus Okuonghae on 7 August, before making his debut in the opening game of the 2014–15 season in Colchester's 2–2 home draw with Oldham Athletic. Clohessy played 37 games for Colchester, and captained the side on a number of occasions, but following his withdrawal by manager Tony Humes in Colchester's 2–0 defeat to Doncaster Rovers on 28 February, he reacted by refusing to shake his manager's hand. Humes in turn left Clohessy out of the first-team squad for the final two months of the campaign, and on 5 May 2015, his contract was terminated one year into his two-year contract.

=== Leyton Orient ===
Clohessy joined Leyton Orient during the summer of 2015.

=== Non-League career ===
Clohessy spent the 2016–17 season playing for Braintree Town, after which he signed for Leatherhead. On 3 May 2018, Clohessy followed manager Sammy Moore to National League South club Concord Rangers, before moving to Kingstonian of the Isthmian League in December of the same year. In September 2020, he signed for East Grinstead Town.

== Career statistics ==
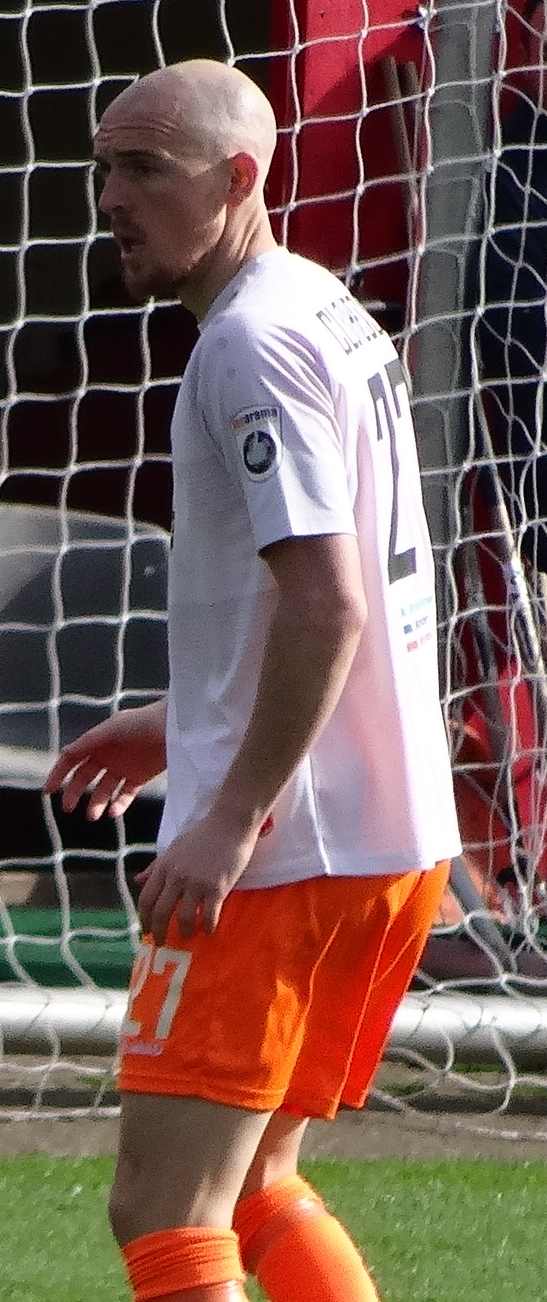
Clohessy playing for Braintree Town in 2017

As of match played 28 February 2015

Club performance			League		Cup		League Cup		Other		Total	
Club	Season	League	Apps	Goals	Apps	Goals	Apps	Goals	Apps	Goals	Apps	Goals
England			League		FA Cup		League Cup		Other		Total	
Gillingham	2005–06	League One	20	1	0	0	0	0	1 (Note: Appearances in the Football League Trophy)	0	21	1
Gillingham	2006–07	League One	6	0	0	0	0	0	0	0	6	0
Gillingham	2007–08	League One	17	0	0	0	0	0	2	0	19	0
Gillingham	2008–09	League Two	0	0	0	0	0	0	0	0	0	0
Gillingham	Total		43	1	0	0	0	0	3	0	46	1
Salisbury City (loan)	2008–09	Conference Premier	36	3	0	0	0	0	0	0	36	3
Salisbury City	2009–10	Conference Premier	39	2	1	0	0	0	0	0	40	2
Bath City	2010–11	Conference Premier	0	0	0	0	0	0	0	0	0	0
Southend United	2010–11	League Two	46	1	2	0	1	0	2	0	51	1
Southend United	2011–12	League Two	45	0	4	0	1	0	6 (Note: Appearances in the Football League play-offs)	0	56	0
Southend United	2012–13	League Two	46	3	5	0	1	0	7	1	59	4
Southend United	Total		137	4	11	0	3	0	15	1	166	5
Scotland			League		Scottish Cup		League Cup		Other		Total	
Kilmarnock	2013–14	Scottish Premiership	24	2	1	0	1	0	–		26	2
England			League		FA Cup		League Cup		Other		Total	
Colchester United	2014–15	League One	32	0	3	0	1	0	1	0	37	0
Career total			311	12	16	0	5	0	19	1	349	13

== Honours ==
Southend United

- Football League Trophy runner-up: 2012–13

Individual

- PFA Team of the Year: 2012–13 League Two
- Southend United Supporters' Player of the Year: 2012–13
