= Seedy Njie =

Seedy Njie may refer to:

- Seedy Njie (footballer) (born 1994), English former footballer
- Seedy Njie (politician) (born 1984), Gambian politician
