= Mark Phillips (footballer) =

English footballer (born 1982)

Personal information
- Full name: Mark Ian Phillips
- Date of birth: 27 January 1982 (age 44)
- Place of birth: Lambeth, England
- Height: 6 ft 2 in (1.88 m)
- Position: Defender

Youth career
- Elms
- 1995–2000: Millwall

Senior career*
Years	Team	Apps	(Gls)
2000–2008	Millwall	67	(1)
2007	→ Darlington (loan)	8	(0)
2008–2010	Brentford	55	(1)
2010–2014	Southend United	93	(12)
2014	→ Aldershot Town (loan)	7	(1)
2014–2015	AFC Wimbledon	5	(0)
2014–2015	→ Aldershot Town (loan)	5	(0)
2015–2016	Braintree Town	41	(1)
2016–2017	Ebbsfleet United	21	(1)
2017–2018	Greenwich Borough	21	(2)
2018–2022	Kingstonian	13	(0)
Total		336	(19)
- * Club domestic league appearances and goals

Mark Ian Phillips (born 27 January 1982, Lambeth) is a retired professional footballer who played in the Football League for Southend United, Millwall, Brentford, Darlington and AFC Wimbledon as a defender.

== Career ==
Phillips was signed as a youth player for Millwall at age 13 and first appeared with the senior team in September 2001. He suffered from frequent injuries and notched up just 67 league appearances during his seven years at Millwall, scoring once against Sheffield United. He was released at the end of the 2007–08 season.

Phillips signed a one-year deal for Brentford on 14 August 2008, after a successful trial spell and played regularly for the first team after James Wilson's loan had expired. He ended up being an important member of the Brentford League Two winners squad and signed a new contract at the conclusion of the 2008–09 season. He scored his first and only goal for the club in a 1–1 draw with Notts County.

He was released by Brentford on 11 May 2010, along with three other players.

Phillips trialled with League Two side Southend United in July 2010. On 31 July, Phillips signed a pre-contract agreement for Southend United. On 4 August 2010, Southend's transfer embargo was lifted and Phillips signed a two-year contract.

Phillips started Southend's first game of the season against Stockport County on 7 August 2010 and on 14 August 2010 against Aldershot Town. Since then Phillips has been plagued by groin injuries which required surgery. In January 2011 Phillips returned to full training.

In 2011–12, Phillips regained his place in the starting XI for Southend and formed a solid partnership at centre back with club captain Chris Barker. Despite a few small injuries, Phillips has remained a permanent fixture in the Blues back four and was named captain for the abandoned game against Aldershot on Boxing Day 2011. At the end of the 2011–12 season, Phillips was named Player of the year down to his frequent strong performances.

On 27 March 2014, Phillips joined Conference side Aldershot Town on loan for the remainder of the 2013–14 season.

On 23 June 2014, Phillips joined AFC Wimbledon on a free transfer.

Phillips re-joined Aldershot Town on loan on 3 October 2014.

== Personal life ==
Phillips is a Millwall supporter.

== Career statistics ==
Appearances and goals by club, season and competition
Club	Season	League			FA Cup		League Cup		Europe		Other		Total	
Club	Season	Division	Apps	Goals	Apps	Goals	Apps	Goals	Apps	Goals	Apps	Goals	Apps	Goals
Millwall	2001–02	First Division	1	0	0	0	0	0	―		0	0	1	0
Millwall	2002–03	First Division	7	0	0	0	1	0	―		―		8	0
Millwall	2003–04	First Division	0	0	0	0	1	0	―		―		1	0
Millwall	2004–05	Championship	25	1	1	0	0	0	0	0	―		26	1
Millwall	2005–06	Championship	22	0	0	0	2	0	―		―		24	0
Millwall	2006–07	League One	12	0	1	0	0	0	―		1 (Note: Appearances in Football League Trophy)	0	14	0
Millwall	Total		67	1	2	0	4	0	0	0	1	0	74	1
Darlington (loan)	2006–07	League Two	8	0	―		―		―		―		8	0
Brentford	2008–09	League Two	33	1	2	0	0	0	―		2	0	37	1
Brentford	2009–10	League One	22	0	0	0	1	0	―		0	0	23	0
Brentford	Total		55	1	2	0	1	0	―		2	0	59	1
Southend United	2010–11	League Two	5	0	0	0	0	0	―		0	0	5	0
Southend United	2011–12	League Two	39	7	4	0	1	1	―		2 (Note: 1 appearance in League Two play-offs, 1 appearance in Football League Trophy)	0	46	8
Southend United	2012–13	League Two	21	3	4	0	1	0	―		4	0	30	3
Southend United	2013–14	League Two	27	2	3	0	1	0	―		1	0	32	2
Southend United	Total		93	12	11	0	3	1	―		7	0	114	13
Aldershot Town (loan)	2013–14	Conference Premier	7	1	―		―		―		―		7	1
AFC Wimbledon	2014–15	League Two	5	0	0	0	1	0	―		1	0	7	0
Aldershot Town (loan)	2014–15	Conference Premier	5	0	1	0	―		―		1 (Note: Appearance in FA Trophy)	0	7	0
Aldershot Town (loan)	Total		12	1	1	0	―		―		1	0	14	1
Braintree Town	2015–16	National League	41	1	2	0	―		―		2	0	45	1
Ebbsfleet United	2016–17	National League South	21	1	1	0	―		―		1	0	23	1
Greenwich Borough	2017–18	Isthmian League First Division Division	21	2	2	0	―		―		2 (Note: 1 appearance in FA Trophy, 1 appearance in Isthmian League Cup)	0	25	2
Kingstonian	2017–18	Isthmian League Premier Division	13	0	―		―		―		1 (Note: Appearance in Surrey Senior Cup)	0	14	0
Career total			336	19	21	0	9	1	0	0	18	0	384	20

== Honours ==
Brentford

- Football League Two: 2008–09

Southend United

- Football League Trophy runner-up: 2012–13

Individual

- Southend United Player of the Year: 2011–12
