= Kane Ferdinand =

English footballer (born 1992)

Personal information
- Full name: Kane Ryan Ferdinand
- Date of birth: 7 October 1992 (age 34)
- Place of birth: Newham, England
- Height: 6 ft 1 in (1.85 m)
- Position: Midfielder

Youth career
- –2010: Southend United

Senior career*
Years	Team	Apps	(Gls)
2010–2012	Southend United	61	(10)
2012–2015	Peterborough United	46	(1)
2013	→ Northampton Town (loan)	4	(0)
2014	→ Luton Town (loan)	1	(0)
2014–2015	→ Cheltenham Town (loan)	16	(0)
2015–2016	Dagenham & Redbridge	15	(1)
2016	East Thurrock United	13	(5)
2016–2021	Woking	145	(16)
2021–2026	Maidenhead United	140	(10)

International career
2010	Republic of Ireland U18	12	(0)
2011	Republic of Ireland U19	6	(0)
2013	Republic of Ireland U21	3	(0)
- * Club domestic league appearances and goals as of 14 February 2026 (UTC)

Kane Ryan Ferdinand (born 7 October 1992) is a professional footballer who plays as a midfielder. Ferdinand has previously played for Southend United, Peterborough United, Dagenham & Redbridge and East Thurrock United, Woking and Maidenhead United and has had loan spells at Northampton Town, Luton Town, and Cheltenham Town. He has also represented the Republic of Ireland on several occasions at youth level.

== Club career ==
=== Southend United ===
Born in Newham, London, Ferdinand came through Southend United's youth system. He made his first-team debut on 1 January 2011, playing 90 minutes in a 2–0 away win over Oxford United in League Two. On 15 February 2011, Ferdinand scored his first goal for the club in a 3–2 victory over Wycombe Wanderers. In March 2011, Ferdinand signed a two-and-a-half-year professional contract with Southend. He played in 45 games, scoring seven goals, during the 2011–12 season as Southend reached the League Two play-off semi-finals.

=== Peterborough United ===
On 31 August 2012, Ferdinand signed for Peterborough United on a four-year contract for an initial fee of £200,000, which could rise to £500,000. He made his debut on 15 September 2012 in a 5–2 away defeat to Burnley. He went on to play 33 times for Peterborough in the Championship during the 2012–13 season, scoring once – the winning goal in a 1–0 victory away to Blackpool on 16 March 2013. Peterborough were relegated to League One on the last day of the season, and Ferdinand fell out of first-team contention. He joined League Two club Northampton Town on 31 October 2013 on a one-month loan. After making five appearances at Northampton, impressing manager Aidy Boothroyd, his loan ended early on 28 November as he was recalled by Peterborough. Ferdinand played in three games for Peterborough following his recall, before being sent on loan for the rest of the season to Conference Premier leaders Luton Town on 3 January 2014. He made one substitute appearance in the league for Luton, as well as starting in the FA Trophy, before returning to Peterborough. Luton manager John Still stated that Ferdinand had "not done as well as I had hoped." In November 2014, Ferdinand joined Cheltenham Town on a two-month loan.

Ferdinand left Peterborough United in July 2015 by mutual consent.

In August 2015, he signed for Dagenham & Redbridge on an initial one-month contract. In February 2016, it was announced that he had left Dagenham by mutual consent, having failed to be offered a new contract.

=== Non-league spells ===
On 2 September 2016, Ferdinand signed for National League South club East Thurrock United. A day later, Ferdinand made his East Thurrock United debut in a 6–0 away victory over Truro City, replacing Joe Gardner in the 75th minute. On 24 September 2016, Ferdinand scored his first East Thurrock United goal in a 2–2 draw with Bishop's Stortford, equalizing with three minutes remaining. On 12 December 2016, he scored the winner in a 4–3 away victory over Aldershot Town in an FA Trophy tie.

=== Woking ===
On 23 December 2016, Ferdinand signed for National League club Woking. Three days later, Ferdinand made his Woking debut in a 4–0 away defeat against Aldershot Town, featuring for the entire 90 minutes. Ferdinand signed a new one-year contract after impressing new Woking manager Anthony Limbrick, contracting him to the club until May 2018. On 28 August 2017, Ferdinand scored his first goal for Woking during their 4–1 victory over Torquay United. On 21 October 2017, Ferdinand was sent off during Woking's league tie against Bromley after a challenge on Jordan Higgs.

On 25 July 2018, despite Woking's relegation to the National League South, he agreed a new one-year deal following a successful trial period under new manager, Alan Dowson. In the month of August 2018, Ferdinand became a key figure in Dowson's side, starting all seven games and netting two crucial goals in their wins over Truro City and Eastbourne Borough. Despite an impressive start to the campaign, Ferdinand was in turn, ruled out until late April 2019, after sustaining a serious knee injury back in October 2018. On 12 May 2019, Ferdinand was part of the side that triumphed over Welling United in the National League South play-off final to secure promotion back to the National League at the first time of asking.

On 15 June 2021, it was announced that Ferdinand would leave the club at the end of his contract, collating a total of 162 appearances, scoring 16 goals in all competitions during his four years.

=== Maidenhead United ===
On 21 June 2021, Ferdinand joined Maidenhead United following his release from Woking. He won the manager's player of the year award in 2022–23 season. Ferdinand left the club at the end of the 2025–26 season, after thirteen goals in 156 appearances.

== International career ==
Ferdinand has represented the Republic of Ireland at underage level. He qualifies for Ireland through his Irish mother.

== Personal life ==
He is the cousin of former professional footballer Anton Ferdinand, and former England international footballers Rio Ferdinand and Les Ferdinand.

== Career statistics ==
As of match played end of 2025-26 season

Appearances and goals by club, season and competition
Club	Season	League			FA Cup		League Cup		Other		Total	
Club	Season	Division	Apps	Goals	Apps	Goals	Apps	Goals	Apps	Goals	Apps	Goals
Southend United	2010–11	League Two	22	2	0	0	0	0	0	0	22	2
Southend United	2011–12	League Two	36	7	4	0	1	0	4 (Note: Three appearances in Football League Trophy, one in League Two play-offs)	0	45	7
Southend United	2012–13	League Two	3	1	—		1	0	—		4	1
Southend United	Total		61	10	4	0	2	0	4	0	71	10
Peterborough United	2012–13	Championship	32	1	1	0	—		—		33	1
Peterborough United	2013–14	League One	2	0	—		0	0	1 (Note: Appearance(s) in Football League Trophy)	0	3	0
Peterborough United	2014–15	League One	12	0	0	0	1	0	1	0	14	0
Peterborough United	Total		46	1	1	0	1	0	2	0	50	1
Northampton Town (loan)	2013–14	League Two	4	0	1	0	—		—		5	0
Luton Town (loan)	2013–14	Conference Premier	1	0	—		—		1 (Note: Appearance in FA Trophy)	0	2	0
Cheltenham Town (loan)	2014–15	League Two	16	0	1	0	—		—		17	0
Dagenham & Redbridge	2015–16	League Two	15	1	0	0	1	0	2	0	18	1
East Thurrock United	2016–17	National League South	13	5	1	0	—		3 (Note: Two appearances and one goal in FA Trophy, one in Essex Senior Cup)	1	17	6
Woking	2016–17	National League	22	0	—		—		—		22	0
Woking	2017–18	National League	44	4	5	0	—		1	0	50	4
Woking	2018–19	National League South	12	2	0	0	—		2 (Note: Appearance(s) in National League South play-offs)	0	14	2
Woking	2019–20	National League	32	4	2	0	—		1	0	35	4
Woking	2020–21	National League	35	6	2	0	—		4	0	41	6
Woking	Total		145	16	9	0	—		8	0	162	16
Maidenhead United	2021–22	National League	38	6	2	1	—		0	0	40	7
Maidenhead United	2022–23	National League	37	3	1	0	—		4 (Note: One appearance in Berks & Bucks Senior Cup, three appearances and two goals in FA Trophy)	2	42	5
Maidenhead United	2023–24	National League	32	1	1	0	—		1	0	34	1
Maidenhead United	2024–25	National League	18	0	0	0	—		2 (Note: Appearances in National League Cup)	0	20	0
Maidenhead United	2025–26	National League South	15	0	1	0	—		0	0	16	0
Maidenhead United	Total		140	10	5	1	—		7	2	152	13
Career total			240	43	22	1	4	0	27	3	494	47

== Honours ==
=== Club ===
Woking

- National League South play-offs: 2018–19
