= Peter Gilbert (Welsh footballer) =

Welsh footballer

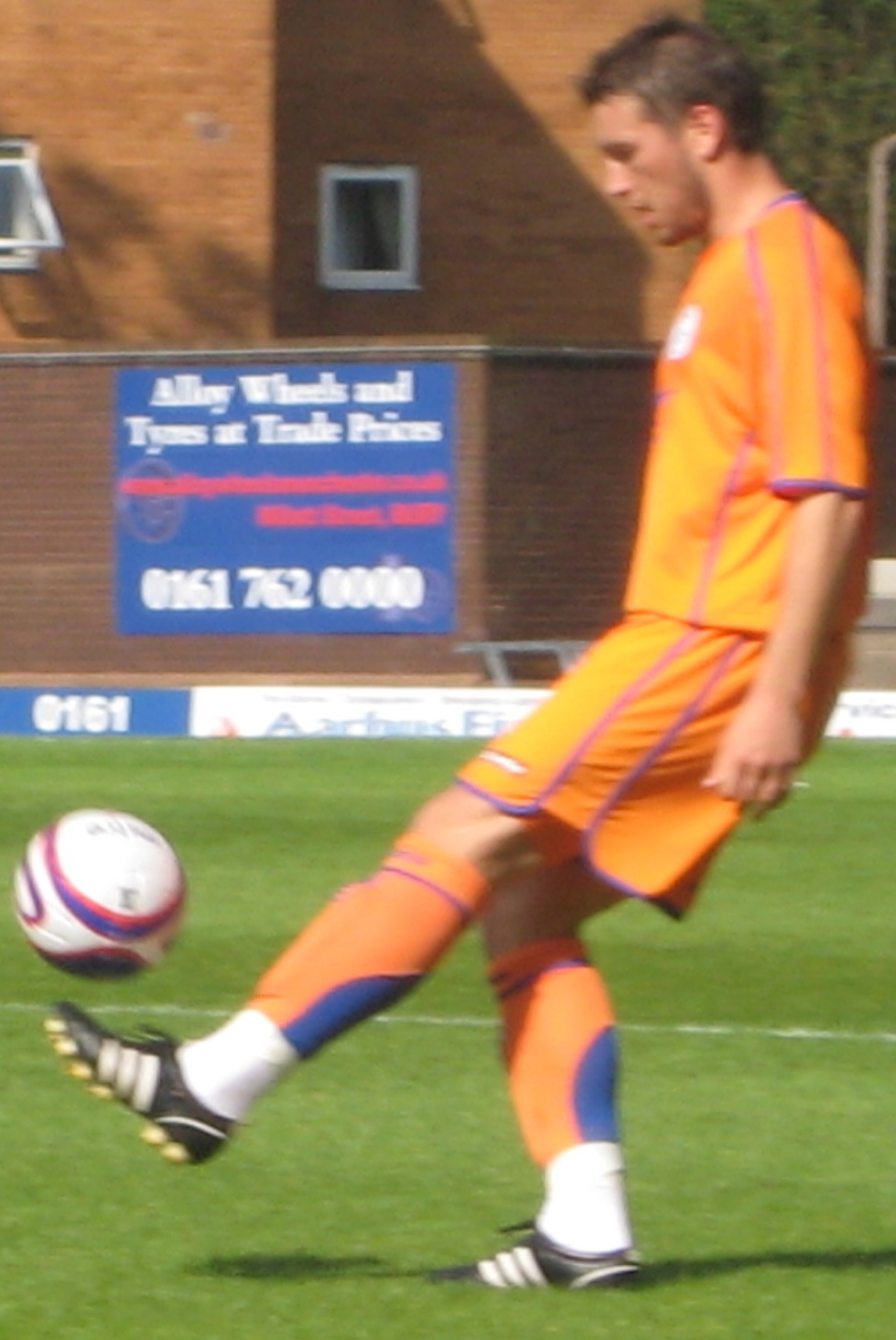
- Gilbert playing for Sheffield Wednesday in 2008

Personal information
- Full name: Eric Peter Gilbert
- Date of birth: 31 July 1983 (age 43)
- Place of birth: Newcastle upon Tyne, England
- Height: 5 ft 9 in (1.75 m)
- Position: Left back

Team information
- Current team: Aston Villa Under-21s (coach)

Youth career
- 1999–2002: Birmingham City

Senior career*
Years	Team	Apps	(Gls)
2002–2003	Birmingham City	0	(0)
2003–2005	Plymouth Argyle	78	(1)
2005–2006	Leicester City	5	(0)
2005–2006	→ Sheffield Wednesday (loan)	7	(0)
2006–2009	Sheffield Wednesday	34	(0)
2007	→ Doncaster Rovers (loan)	4	(0)
2009	Oldham Athletic	5	(0)
2009–2010	Northampton Town	30	(0)
2010–2012	Southend United	57	(3)
2012–2013	Lincoln City	14	(0)
2013	→ Dagenham & Redbridge (loan)	0	(0)
2014	Goole		
Total		234	(4)

International career
2004–2005	Wales U21	10	(1)
- * Club domestic league appearances and goals

Eric Peter Gilbert (born 31 July 1983), known as Peter Gilbert, is a Welsh former footballer and current coach.

A defender, Gilbert played in the Football League for Plymouth Argyle, Leicester City, Sheffield Wednesday, Doncaster Rovers, Oldham Athletic, Northampton Town and Southend United, also appearing in the Conference for Lincoln City and briefly in the Northern Premier League for Goole. He represented Wales at under-21 level.

Gilbert is currently coaching Aston Villa Under-21s.

== Career ==
Gilbert began his career at Birmingham City as a trainee but failed to make a first team appearance. He did captain the academy side during his time with the Blues and made many appearances for the reserves. His progress was hampered by a serious knee injury. Once he recovered the decision was made to make a fresh start at another club. He joined Plymouth Argyle at the beginning of the 2003–04 season on loan, where his performances earned him a permanent move. Once he signed, Gilbert soon proved himself to be a reliable and steady player and was a mainstay of Argyle's Second Division championship-winning side, playing 40 league games and scoring one goal against Tranmere Rovers. His only other goal for Plymouth came three days after his goal against Tranmere in a Football League Trophy tie against Bristol City.

This run of form led him to be called up to the Welsh under-21 squad and receiving his first cap. He went on to make 10 appearances in the 2006 UEFA Under-21 Championship qualifying campaign. During this campaign he impressed head coach John Toshack enough to consider him for the senior squad, and was a member of Toshack's senior squad for a six-day training camp in Spain at the end of the 2004–05 season.

He made 38 appearances for Argyle in the Championship during 2004–05. This led to interest from Leicester City manager Craig Levein who signed Gilbert for the start of the 2005–06 season, for a fee in the region of £200,000.

However, Gilbert made just six appearances for Leicester before being loaned to fellow Championship side Sheffield Wednesday in November 2005. He joined Wednesday on a permanent basis in 2006 and, following three years at the club, his contract was terminated by mutual consent on 6 April 2009.

After trials with Huddersfield Town, Southend United and Coventry City, Gilbert joined Oldham Athletic on a short-term contract. However, because the player wanted more stability than was afforded by the week-to-week deal with Oldham, he left before the 1 September transfer deadline to allow him the chance to find a permanent club.

In September 2009, Gilbert had a trial with Conference National side Mansfield Town. After a two-week trial spell in which he played the whole of a reserve game, he signed for League Two club Northampton Town in November until the end of the 2009–10 season.

On 8 July 2010 Gilbert signed a pre contract agreement with Southend United due to the club being under a transfer embargo, on 6 August 2010 Southend's embargo was lifted allowing Gilbert to be registered with the Roots Hall club. Gilbert had previously played under Southend boss Paul Sturrock at Sheffield Wednesday and Plymouth Argyle.

Gilbert picked up an ankle injury in a pre season game against Derby County which forced him to miss the start of the league season. He finally made his debut for the club on 24 August 2010 against Wolverhampton Wanderers in the League Cup. Gilbert made his league debut in Southend's 2–0 win against Bradford City on 27 August 2010. After a 2011–12 season which ended in playoff defeat, the club did not offer Gilbert a new contract.

Gilbert joined Conference National club Lincoln City on non-contract terms in October 2012. He went on to sign a short-term contract which was later extended to the end of the season. At the end of March, he joined Dagenham & Redbridge on loan until the end of the season. In January 2014, he signed for Northern Premier League First Division South club Goole, managed by his former teammate Curtis Woodhouse. Later that year, he travelled to California where he played in two friendly matches for USL Pro club Sacramento Republic.

== Coaching career ==
After the end of his playing career, Gilbert joined West Bromwich Albion Academy as a coach. Working with various age groups over an eight-year spell – ultimately acting as U18s manager from 2019 to 2022.

In August 2022, Gilbert joined Aston Villa Academy as an Under-21s coach.

== Career statistics ==
As of match played 28 February 2013

Appearances and goals by club, season and competition
Club	Season	League			FA Cup		League Cup		Other		Total	
Club	Season	Division	Apps	Goals	Apps	Goals	Apps	Goals	Apps	Goals	Apps	Goals
Birmingham City	2002–03	Premier League	0	0	0	0	0	0	—		0	0
Plymouth Argyle	2003–04	Second Division	40	1	1	0	1	0	2 (Note: Appearance(s) in Football League Trophy)	1	44	2
Plymouth Argyle	2004–05	Championship	38	0	1	0	1	0	—		40	0
Plymouth Argyle	Total		78	1	2	0	2	0	2	1	84	2
Leicester City	2005–06	Championship	5	0	0	0	0	0	—		5	0
Sheffield Wednesday	2005–06	Championship	17	0	0	0	0	0	—		17	0
Sheffield Wednesday	2006–07	Championship	6	0	0	0	0	0	—		6	0
Sheffield Wednesday	2007–08	Championship	10	0	0	0	1	0	—		11	0
Sheffield Wednesday	2008–09	Championship	8	0	0	0	1	0	—		9	0
Sheffield Wednesday	Total		41	0	0	0	2	0	—		43	0
Doncaster Rovers (loan)	2006–07	League One	4	0	0	0	0	0	1	0	5	0
Oldham Athletic	2009–10	League One	5	0	0	0	1	0	0	0	6	0
Northampton Town	2009–10	League Two	30	0	1	0	0	0	0	0	31	0
Southend United	2010–11	League Two	26	0	1	0	1	0	3	0	31	0
Southend United	2011–12	League Two	31	3	4	0	0	0	5 (Note: 3 appearances in Football League Trophy, 2 appearances in Football League Two play-offs)	0	40	3
Southend United	Total		57	3	5	0	1	0	8	0	71	3
Lincoln City	2012–13	Conference Premier	14	0	5	0	0	0	1 (Note: Appearance(s) in FA Trophy)	0	20	0
Dagenham & Redbridge (loan)	2012–13	League Two	0	0	0	0	0	0	0	0	0	0
Career total			234	4	13	0	6	0	12	1	265	5

== Honours ==
Plymouth Argyle

- Football League Second Division: 2003–04
