= Kyle Asante =

English footballer

Personal information
- Full name: Kyle Emmanuel Kwabena Asante
- Date of birth: 13 November 1991 (age 34)
- Place of birth: Essex, England
- Height: 5 ft 10 in (1.78 m)
- Position: Forward

Team information
- Current team: Bishop's Stortford (dual registration with Great Wakering Rovers)

Youth career
- –2008: Southend United

Senior career*
Years	Team	Apps	(Gls)
2008–2012	Southend United	18	(7)
2008	→ Harlow Town (loan)	2	(0)
2011	→ Concord Rangers (loan)	6	(5)
2011	→ Canvey Island (loan)	5	(6)
2012	→ Thurrock (loan)	8	(0)
2012–2013	St Neots Town		
2013	Bishop's Stortford		
2013–2014	Aveley		
2014	Bishop's Stortford		
2014	Maldon & Tiptree		
2014–2015	Aveley		
2015–2016	Cheshunt		
2016	Witham Town		
2016	VCD Athletic		
2016	Aveley		
2016–	Bishop's Stortford		
2016	→ Billericay Town (dual registration)	1	(0)
2016–2017	→ Great Wakering Rovers (dual registration)		
- * Club domestic league appearances and goals as of 02:47, 26 September 2016 (UTC)

Kyle Emmanuel Kwabena Asante (born 9 April 1991) is an English EX-professional footballer who plays for Bishop's Stortford

== Career ==
Asante was born in Chelmsford, Essex. He made his debut for Southend United on 7 November 2009 in their 3–0 away defeat to Gillingham in the FA Cup first round, replacing James Walker in the 83rd minute as a substitute.

Asante suffered a cruciate knee ligament injury which hampered his progress with the first team. On 8 February 2011, Asante scored a hat-trick in a 4–1 against Luton Town in a reserve game which led to manager Paul Sturrock naming him in his first team squad. Asante made his league debut as a sub on 19 February 2011 replacing Blair Sturrock against Torquay United.

On 18 May 2012, Asante was one of eleven players to be released at the end of their contract.

He moved on to Barnet on a trial which never materialised in a contract, before signing for St Neots Town in December 2012.

He then spent the first half of the 2013–14 season with Bishop's Stortford, before joining Aveley midway through the campaign. After rejoining Bishop's Stortford in the summer of 2014, he was injured in a serious car crash on the A12 major road.

When recovered later that year he had a brief spell with Maldon & Tiptree, before returning to Aveley. In February 2015 he joined Thamesmead Town as a trialist.

Further transfers that season include Cheshunt in 2015, Witham Town in January 2016, VCD Athletic in February 2016, and Aveley for the third time in March 2016,

In July 2016 he joined Bishop's Stortford for a third spell. Shortly after he signed for Billericay Town on dual registration basis to gain match fitness, but the spell was cut short by 2 September 2016 after making just one appearance, and instead he switched to Great Wakering Rovers on similar terms on 13 September 2016.
