= Merrick James-Lewis =

English footballer (born 1992)

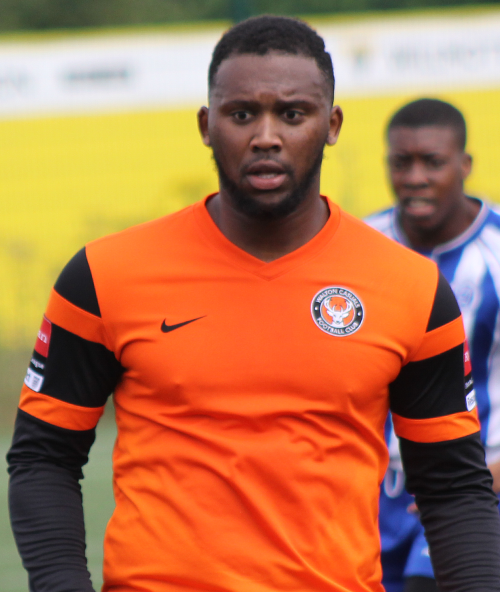
- James-Lewis in action for Walton Casuals

Personal information
- Full name: Merrick Anthony James-Lewis
- Date of birth: 21 May 1992 (age 34)
- Place of birth: Lambeth, England
- Height: 6 ft 0 in (1.83 m)
- Position: Midfielder

Youth career
- Fulham
- –2010: Southend United

Senior career*
Years	Team	Apps	(Gls)
2010–2012	Southend United	1	(0)
2011	→ Braintree Town (loan)	4	(0)
2011	→ Braintree Town (loan)	3	(0)
2011–2012	→ Bishop's Stortford (loan)	5	(0)
2012	→ Carshalton Athletic (loan)	10	(0)
2012	Colchester United	0	(0)
- Concord Rangers
2013	Canvey Island	1	(0)
2013	Ebbsfleet United	0	(0)
2013	Farnborough	7	(0)
2013–2014	Walton & Hersham		
2014	Crawley Down Gatwick	7	(?)
2014	Cray Wanderers		
2014	Staines Town	19	(0)
2014	Walton Casuals		
2014–2015	Grays Athletic	5	(0)
2015	Walton Casuals		
2015	Maldon & Tiptree	5	(0)
2015	Tooting & Mitcham United		
2015	Heybridge Swifts	1	(0)
2015–2016	Merstham	9	(0)
2016	Canvey Island	5	(1)
2016	Farnborough	3	(0)
2016	Enfield Town	0	(0)
2016	AFC Uckfield Town	4	(0)
2016	Thamesmead Town		
2016–2017	Hendon	4	(0)
2017	Thamesmead Town	0	(0)
2017	Walton Casuals	5	(0)
2017	Herne Bay	1	(0)
2018	Thamesmead Town	7	(0)
2018	Egham Town	4	(0)
2020	Lewes	5	(0)
2020	South Park	3	(1)
2021	Haywards Heath Town	0	(0)
2021	Sutton Common Rovers	3	(0)
2021–2022	East Grinstead Town	14	(1)
2022	Corinthian-Casuals	2	(0)
2023	Tower Hamlets	4	(0)
- * Club domestic league appearances and goals as of 04:30, 16 April 2024 (UTC)

Merrick Anthony James-Lewis (born 21 May 1992) is an English semi-professional footballer who plays as a central midfielder.

He has also played for Southend United, Braintree Town, Bishop's Stortford, Carshalton Athletic, Colchester United, Concord Rangers, Canvey Island, Ebbsfleet United, Farnborough, Walton & Hersham, Crawley Down Gatwick, Cray Wanderers, Staines Town, Grays Athletic, Maldon & Tiptree, Tooting & Mitcham United, Heybridge Swifts, Merstham, Enfield Town, Uckfield Town, Thamesmead Town, Hendon and Herne Bay.

== Career ==
=== Southend United ===
James-Lewis came through Southend United's youth system, signing a professional contract with the club in August 2010, having previously been with Fulham. He joined Conference South club Braintree Town on loan in March 2011, for the remainder of the 2010–11 season.

The following season, he went out on loan to Braintree Town again in August, having been promoted to the Conference National. He was recalled on 19 September, due to a lack of first-team opportunities, having made just four appearances. James-Lewis made his professional début for Southend on 24 September 2011, coming on as a substitute for Ryan Leonard in the 79th minute in their 4–0 away win at Rotherham United.

On 16 March 2012, it was announced that James-Lewis would join Carshalton Athletic on a month's loan.

On 18 May, James-Lewis was one of eleven players to be released at the end of their contract.

=== Colchester United ===
After his release, he went on trial with Southend's rivals Colchester United, playing in a pre-season friendly against Heybridge Swifts. Following a successful trial with the club he was given an initial deal on 30 July 2012. Having made A handful of appearances for the U's, James-Lewis was released by Colchester following the expiration of his contract.

=== Non-League ===
==== 2013 onwards ====
In February 2013 James-Lewis was signed by Canvey Island, after being on the books of island neighbours Concord Rangers. He made just one appearance for The Gulls, away to Lowestoft Town. On 2 April 2013, he signed for Conference side Ebbsfleet United on a short-term contract until the end of the season. He was featured on the bench for the club's 1–1 draw with Barrow on 4 April.

Farnborough manager Spencer Day snapped him up prior to the 2013–14 season, following a successful summer trial alongside Tyrone Berry. They were both released following a disappointing FA Cup defeat to Eastbourne Borough on 1 October 2013. The following month he was added to Walton & Hersham caretaker boss James Cameron's squad, before switching to Crawley Down Gatwick in January 2014 and Cray Wanderers in February 2014.

Ahead of the 2014–15 Football Conference season he was handed a chance at Staines Town by manager Marcus Gayle, In early October after 11 games he was gone, being questioned his commitment on both match days and training ground by Gayle. By the summer he had put pen to paper at Walton Casuals in October 2014, Grays Athletic in December 2014, and Walton Casuals again in January 2015.

2015–16 proved to be yet another much-travelled season, starting off at Maldon & Tiptree in June. Shortly after the season kicked off, he featured for Tooting & Mitcham United on 22 August 2015, and in October he switched to Heybridge Swifts. He played only once for The Swifts, in a 3–1 win at Bury Town. Further moves include Merstham in October 2015, and returns to Canvey Island in January 2016 and Farnborough in March 2016.

==== 2016 onwards ====
He signed for AFC Uckfield Town in October 2016, after leaving Enfield Town without making any competitive appearances. In November 2016 he moved to Thamesmead Town, and Hendon in December 2016. He reportedly returned to Thamesmead Town in February 2017, but never featured in a matchday squad list before returning to Walton Casuals for a third spell on deadline day. Despite committing to the club for the 2017–18 season, he failed to make an appearance for the club and joined Herne Bay in October. The spell with The Bay also was short-lived as he only made one appearance. The season opening round of 2018–19 saw him return to Thamesmead Town. Following the club going into creditors voluntary administration in October 2018, he signed for Egham Town of Isthmian League South Central Division in November.

In September 2020, James-Lewis joined Lewes, where he made five appearances in the Isthmian League Premier Division before, in October, moving on to South Park, making three league appearances and scoring one goal, on his debut, in a 4–4 draw with Staines Town.

In July 2021, he joined Haywards Heath Town, but did not play for the club; he moved on in October to Sutton Common Rovers, then again in November to East Grinstead Town, where he scored once in fourteen league appearances in the Isthmian League Division One South East.

In November 2022, he joined Corinthian-Casuals, where he made two league appearances and one in the Surrey Senior Cup. Later that season he moved to Tower Hamlets of east London.

His last known signing is Sutton Athletic of the Southern Counties East League Premier Division ahead of the 2024–25 season.
