= Teddy Nesbitt =

English footballer

Personal information
- Full name: Teddy Moore Nesbitt
- Date of birth: 30 July 1993 (age 33)
- Place of birth: East Ham, England
- Height: 5 ft 9 in (1.75 m)
- Position: Defender

Team information
- Current team: Canvey Island

Youth career
- –2011: Southend United

Senior career*
Years	Team	Apps	(Gls)
2011–2012	Southend United	2	(0)
2011	→ Concord Rangers		
2012	→ Great Wakering Rovers (loan)		
2012	→ Thurrock (loan)	3	(1)
201?–2014	Aveley		
2014	VCD Athletic		
2014	Aveley		
2014–2016	Billericay Town		
2016–2017	East Thurrock United	9	(0)
2017	Hornchurch		
2017–	Canvey Island		
- * Club domestic league appearances and goals as of 00:27, 23 September 2016 (UTC)

Teddy Moore Nesbitt (born 6 September 1993) is a semi-professional footballer who plays for Isthmian League club Canvey Island.

== Career ==
Nesbitt came through Southend United's youth system, making his professional debut on 26 March 2011, in their 2–1 away loss to Stockport County in League Two. He came on as substitute for another debutant, James Stevens at half-time. Southend manager, Paul Sturrock praised Nesbitt saying; "Teddy was excellent when he came on in the second half. He got himself stuck in there and he got himself forward, but he's got a lot to learn." On 18 May 2012, Nesbitt was one of eleven players to be released at the end of their contract.
