= Seedy Njie (footballer) =

English footballer

Personal information
- Full name: Seedy Ishmail Njie
- Date of birth: 1 December 1994 (age 31)
- Place of birth: Lewisham, England
- Position: Striker

Youth career
- Glebe
- 2011–2013: Southend United

Senior career*
| Years | Team | Apps | (Gls) |
| 2012–2014 | Southend United | 1 | (0) |
| 2013 | → Bishop's Stortford (loan) | 6 | (2) |
| 2014 | → Histon (loan) | 4 | (0) |
| 2014 | → Concord Rangers (loan) | 9 | (1) |
| 2014 | Billericay Town | 6 | (1) |
| 2016 | Chelmsford City | 0 | (0) |
| 2016 | Cray Wanderers | 2 | (0) |
- * Club domestic league appearances and goals as of 17:31, 13 October 2016 (UTC)

Seedy Ishmail Njie (born 1 December 1994) is an English former footballer who played as a forward.

== Career ==
Born in Lewisham, Njie started a two-year scholarship with Southend United in July 2011. His professional debut for Southend came on 14 August 2012, in a 4–0 defeat to Peterborough United in the Football League Cup, replacing Elliot Benyon as a substitute.

On 27 March 2014, Njie joined Conference South side Concord Rangers on loan until the end of the 2013–14 season.

On 15 August 2014 it was announced that Njie had joined Billericay Town.

On 24 March 2016, Njie joined Chelmsford City.

For the 2016–17 season, Njie joined Cray Wanderers.
