= Bilel Mohsni =

Tunisian association football player (born 1987)

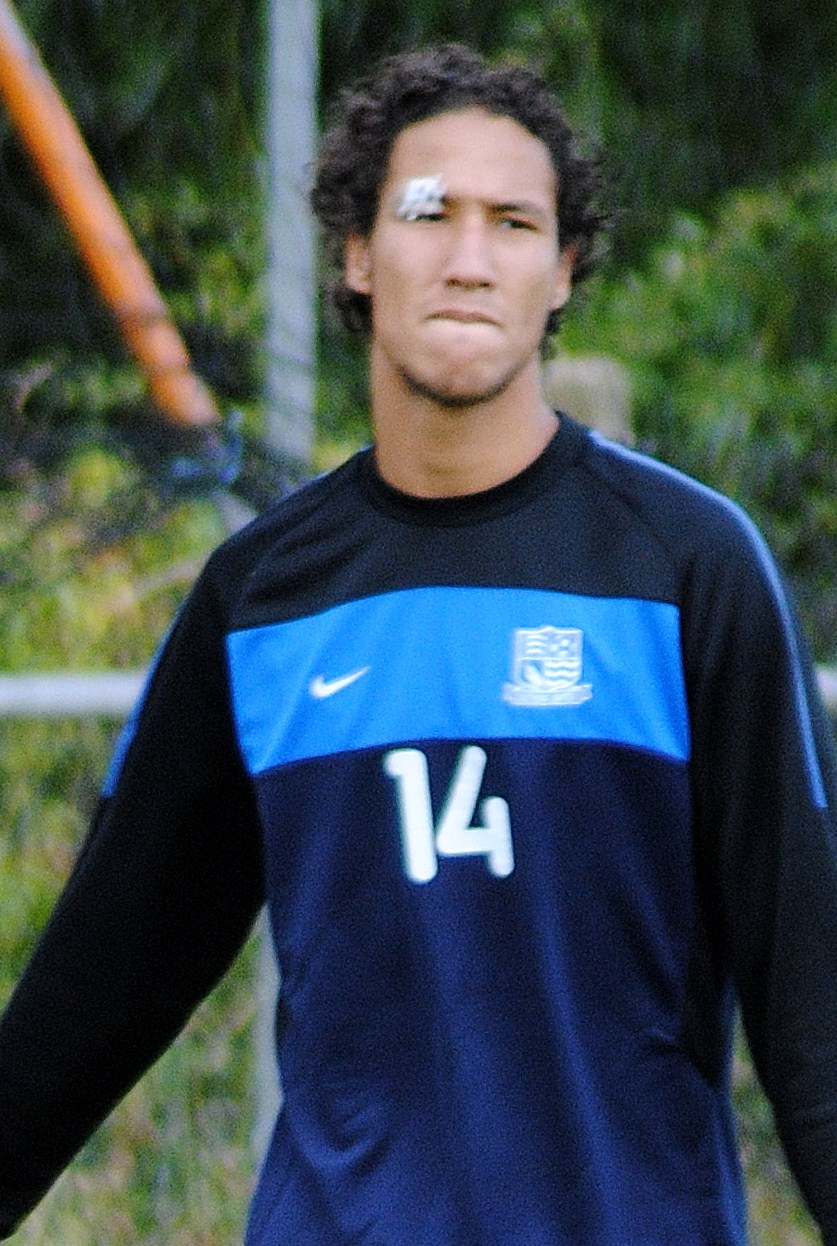
- Mohsni training with Southend United in 2010

Personal information
- Full name: Bilel Mohsni
- Date of birth: 21 July 1987 (age 39)
- Place of birth: Paris, France
- Height: 6 ft 3 in (1.91 m)
- Position: Centre-back

Senior career*
Years	Team	Apps	(Gls)
2005–2006	CO Les Ulis	44	(5)
2006–2007	Mende		
2007–2008	US Saint-Georges	22	(0)
2008–2009	CO Les Ulis	30	(6)
2009–2010	Sainte-Geneviève Sports	29	(2)
2010–2013	Southend United	62	(18)
2012–2013	→ Ipswich Town (loan)	5	(0)
2013–2015	Rangers	44	(11)
2015–2016	Angers	0	(0)
2015	→ Angers B (res.)	4	(0)
2016	Paris FC	14	(0)
2016	Étoile du Sahel	1	(0)
2018	Dundee United	10	(3)
2019–2020	Panachaiki	5	(0)
2020	Grimsby Town	1	(0)
2020–2021	Barnet	3	(0)
2021–2022	Al-Rawdhah	0	(0)
2022	Dungannon Swifts	8	(0)
Total		282	(45)

International career
2014–2018	Tunisia	9	(0)
- * Club domestic league appearances and goals

Bilel Mohsni (born 21 July 1987) is a former professional footballer who played as a centre-back.

He notably played for Rangers where he was part of the Ibrox team who earned promotion in 2014 following their demotion to the foot of the Scottish football system. He also had spells in the English Football League with Southend United, Ipswich Town and Grimsby Town and back in Scotland with Dundee United. Born in France he also saw spells in the country with CO Les Ulis, Mende, US Saint-Georges, Sainte-Geneviève Sports, Angers and Paris FC. In the final few seasons of his career he also played in Tunisia, Saudi Arabia with Étoile du Sahel and Al-Rawdhah, as well as returning to England with non-league side Barnet and Northern Irish side Dungannon Swifts.

He was capped nine times by Tunisia between 2014 and 2018 and was part of their Africa Cup of Nations squad for 2015, and their provisional 29-man roster for the 2018 FIFA World Cup.

== Early life ==
Mohsni is of Tunisian descent and grew up in the Les Ulis suburb of Paris, France.

== Club career ==
=== Early career ===
In his homeland, he played for CO Les Ulis (twice), Mende, US Saint-Georges and Sainte-Geneviève Sports at the beginning of his career, between the years of 2005 and 2010. He combined playing part-time with coaching children in the community.

=== Southend United ===
In the summer of 2010, Mohsni moved to England on the advice of his agent to sign with Southend United of League Two. He was one of seventeen new signings, as new manager Paul Sturrock rebuilt the side following a turbulent period in the club's history which left the club with only a handful of players and in the bottom rung of England's professional football ladder. This followed a successful trial period. This move came despite difficulties in securing his transfer from the French club, after delays in getting the necessary paperwork from the French Football Federation. In September 2010, he signed a new two-year deal with the club.

Mohsni made his Southend debut and his first game in professional football against Wolverhampton Wanderers in the League Cup on 24 August 2010. Mohsni had a goal disallowed for offside and hit the crossbar in the game Southend eventually lost 2–1 after extra time. On 27 August, Mohsni made his league debut against Bradford City. Mohsni scored his first goal for the club on 13 November 2010 in a 1–1 draw against Accrington Stanley. On 21 January 2011, Mohsni scored a 96th-minute equaliser against Bury to salvage a 1–1 draw. In the following game at home to Macclesfield Town, Mohsni was picked to start up front following his leveller against Bury and an injury to Barry Corr. He scored twice in a 4–1 win, with involvement in one of the other goals. On 31 January 2011, Southend rejected a bid of £250,000 from Blackpool for Mohsni. On 5 February 2011, against Shrewsbury Town, Mohsni was stretchered off amidst fears he had suffered a broken ankle, scans later revealed no break or fracture but he had suffered ligament damage and would be out of action for at least two months. Mohsni made his return from injury on 2 April 2011 playing the full 90 minutes in a 0–0 draw against Aldershot Town. His return to first team action also saw him suffer a broken nose after being elbowed by a player.

Starting the 2011–12 season as a striker due to injuries, Mohsni started playing as a centre forward. He scored the only goal in a 1–0 opening day win at home to Hereford United. On 3 September 2011, again playing as a makeshift centre forward, Mohsni scored after a 35-yard strike against Northampton Town. He was later utilised as a winger for the majority of the 2011–12 season, and praised by manager Paul Sturrock for his versatility. However, Mohsni's on-field discipline was poor, resulting in a series of red and yellow cards. In December 2011 he was sent off for third time since joining Southend. On 5 January 2012, Southend manager Sturrock confirmed that he would not be sold in the January transfer window, and would remain at Southend until the end of the season. On 20 April 2012, Mohsni scored a hat-trick in Southend's 3–0 win over Barnet, a result which secured their place in the promotion play-offs. Southend, however, were knocked out of the play-offs by Crewe Alexandra.

Mohsni failed to return for the start of pre-season training ahead of the 2012–13 season. Southend manager Sturrock announced that Mohsni was 'reluctant' to return to the club at all believing he could play his football at a higher level than Southend's League Two and that he was scheduled to go on trial with 'a Premier League side'. On 20 July he appeared for a West Ham United development side in a 4–1 defeat to Grays Athletic, scoring both a goal and an own-goal. In August 2012, West Ham's bid of £150,000 for Mohsni was rejected by Southend.

Mohsni was not given a squad number by Southend before the start of the 2012–13 season. On 28 August 2012, it was announced that Mohsni was to go on trial with SPL club Celtic.

==== Loan to Ipswich Town ====
He then spent a week on trial with Championship club Ipswich Town in September, however, it was later reported that Ipswich would not be signing Mohsni since he refused an extended trial at Portman Road. Mohsni then spent a fortnight on trial with Birmingham City before eventually securing a three-month loan deal with Ipswich Town on 5 October 2012. He played only five games for Ipswich, all substitute appearances, and found first team football opportunities limited due to restrictions on the number of on-loan players a team can field.

=== Return to Southend ===
Having returned from Portman Road on 31 December 2012, Mohsni refused to train with the Shrimpers although he remained registered with the club. In January 2013, Mohsni spent time on trial with Stevenage, training with the squad, although no move materialised.

Eventually, on 16 February 2013, when Southend were desperately short of players through injury and suspension, particularly centre-backs, Mohsni agreed to play for the Blues, wearing the number 28 shirt. He made his return that day in a 2–1 defeat to Northampton, which only lasted 27 minutes after a high footed challenge saw him sent off. He was reported to have watched the remainder of the game from the Roots Hall stands, still wearing his kit. Bilel's final appearance for Southend came at Wembley stadium in the Football League Trophy Final, a competition he had played no previous part in. On 30 April 2013, Mohsni was released by Southend, just 10 months after the club turned West Ham's £150,000 offer for him.

=== Rangers ===
On 4 July 2013, Mohsni began a week's trial at Rangers. The trial was extended by three weeks due to impressive performances in the 2013 pre-season campaign. On 26 July he signed a two-year deal with the club which was due to commence on 1 September when the club's transfer embargo had been lifted. He made his debut for Rangers at Ibrox on 14 September 2013 in a 5–1 win over Arbroath in the league. Mohsni became a regular in the Rangers side, playing in 28 league matches and scoring 10 goals.

Mohsni's ill-discipline flared up again on 2 August when he was sent-off in a pre-season friendly against Derby County. He was red carded for headbutting striker Chris Martin, and as a result received a two-match ban from the SFA for the first two competitive domestic fixtures of the season. Mohsni returned to the Rangers side after his suspension but found himself in further trouble as a result of an altercation with Hibernian defender Liam Fontaine during Hibs' 3–1 win at Ibrox on 29 September 2014. Mohsni was charged with violent conduct days later by the SFA Compliance Officer, and was suspended for three matches.

On 31 May 2015, in the second leg of the Scottish Premiership promotion playoff final at Fir Park, in what was to be Mohsni's final game for Rangers, his time with the club ended in controversy following an altercation with Motherwell's Lee Erwin. At the final whistle, with Motherwell having won the tie, Erwin pushed Mohsni in the back, and he retaliated by kicking and punching Erwin, and also fought with Motherwell substitute, Fraser Kerr. Mohsni, Erwin and Kerr were all shown red cards by referee Craig Thomson after the game had finished. On 1 June, Police Scotland announced an investigation into the incident at Fir Park. On 2 June, the Scottish Football Association revealed that Lee Erwin had only received a yellow card from referee Thomson for his part in the incident. Mohsni later received a seven match ban for the offences.

=== Return to France ===
Mohsni returned to French football in August 2015 when he signed a two-year contract with newly promoted Ligue 1 club Angers SCO.

After six months in Angers without playing with the first team, Mohsni left Angers in January 2016 and signed a six-month contract with Ligue 2 club Paris FC.

=== Later career ===
Mohsni joined Étoile du Sahel in September 2016.

Mohsni signed a short-term contract with Scottish Championship club Dundee United in March 2018. He left the side in May 2018, following the end of his contract.

In February 2019, Moshni penned a 18-month deal with the Patras-based club Panachaiki FC - though this was cut short in July 2019.

In March 2020 he joined Grimsby Town on trial. On 11 August 2020, Mohsni signed for Grimsby on a one-year contract. On 22 November 2020, following a 5–0 defeat against Tranmere Rovers, Ian Holloway announced he had released Mohsni as he did not meet his standards. This prompted Mohsni to set up a Twitter account and post a video to announce that he had not left the club, was still contracted, feeling fit and would be at training the next day. The following day, Holloway said that he thought the termination had been agreed and that it was not his concern whether the player remained at the club until January, Mohsni would go on to sign for Barnet on 1 December 2020, after making just one appearance off of the bench for Grimsby.

On 1 December 2020, Mohsni joined National League club Barnet on a non-contract basis. He was released on 8 January 2021 after three appearances.

On 8 June 2021, Mohsni was on the verge of signing for NIFL Premiership side Dungannon Swifts, managed by former Rangers teammate Dean Shiels. The deal was expected to be confirmed and was waiting for international clearance., however on 3 July 2021 it was announced that Mohsni joined Saudi Arabian second-tier side Al-Rawdah.

On 24 February 2022, Mohsni signed a contract with NIFL Premiership side Dungannon Swifts, following speculation of a move from the previous summer.

Moshni announced his retirement from professional football in December 2022, citing family reasons and the need to look after his father, who is suffering with Alzheimer's.

== International career ==
Mohsni was born and raised in France, but is also of Tunisian descent where his father was born. He was named in the Tunisia national team's squad for its friendly match against South Korea on 28 May 2014, where he made his international debut in a 1–0 win.

Tunisia coach Georges Leekens selected Mohsni for the 23-man squad taking part in the 2015 Africa Cup of Nations. However, Mohsni was an unused substitute in their opening 1–1 draw against Cape Verde and he had to deny reports of quitting the tournament after storming out of the dressing room at full-time. Tunisia reached the quarter-finals, where they lost 2–1 after extra-time to host nation Equatorial Guinea. Mohsni however did not feature in any of Tunisia four matches at the tournament.

After an absence from the team of over 18 months, Mohnsi played against Togo on 29 March 2016 in a qualifier tie for the 2017 Africa Cup of Nations.

In May 2018 he was named in Tunisia's preliminary 29-man squad for the 2018 World Cup in Russia. He was dropped from the final 23-man squad. Mohsni reacted angrily, calling his omission an "injustice".

== Personal life ==
Mohsni is a devout Muslim. During his time at Rangers, a room was set aside at both Rangers Training Centre and Ibrox Stadium to enable him to pray at the required times throughout the day. He was also permitted to arrive at a later time for training on Fridays to allow him to attend his mosque.

== Honours ==
Southend United

- Football League Trophy runner-up: 2012–13

Rangers

- Scottish League One: 2013–14

Individual

- Football League Two Player of the Month: April 2012
