= James Stevens (footballer, born 1992) =

English footballer

Personal information
- Full name: James Daniel Stevens
- Date of birth: 10 October 1992 (age 34)
- Place of birth: Grays, England
- Position: Midfielder

Youth career
- West Ham United
- –2011: Southend United

Senior career*
Years	Team	Apps	(Gls)
2011–2012	Southend United	1	(0)
2011–2012	→ Great Wakering Rovers (loan)	3	(0)
2012–2014	Witham Town	?	(?)
2014–2015	Grays Athletic	39	(7)
2015–20??	Bowers & Pitsea	?	(?)

International career
- Northern Ireland U18
- Northern Ireland U19
- * Club domestic league appearances and goals as of 11:26, 27 January 2016 (UTC)

James Daniel Stevens (born 10 October 1992) is a former professional footballer.

== Career ==
Stevens came through Southend United's youth system, making his professional debut on 26 March 2011, starting in their 2–1 away loss to Stockport County in League Two. He was substituted for another debutant, Teddy Nesbitt at half-time.

In August 2011, he joined Isthmian League Division One North club Great Wakering Rovers on loan alongside George Artemi and George Smith.

On 18 May 2012, Stevens was one of eleven players to be released at the end of their contract.

In August 2012, Stevens signed for Isthmian League side Witham Town on a free transfer.
