= Chris Barker =

English footballer (1980–2020)

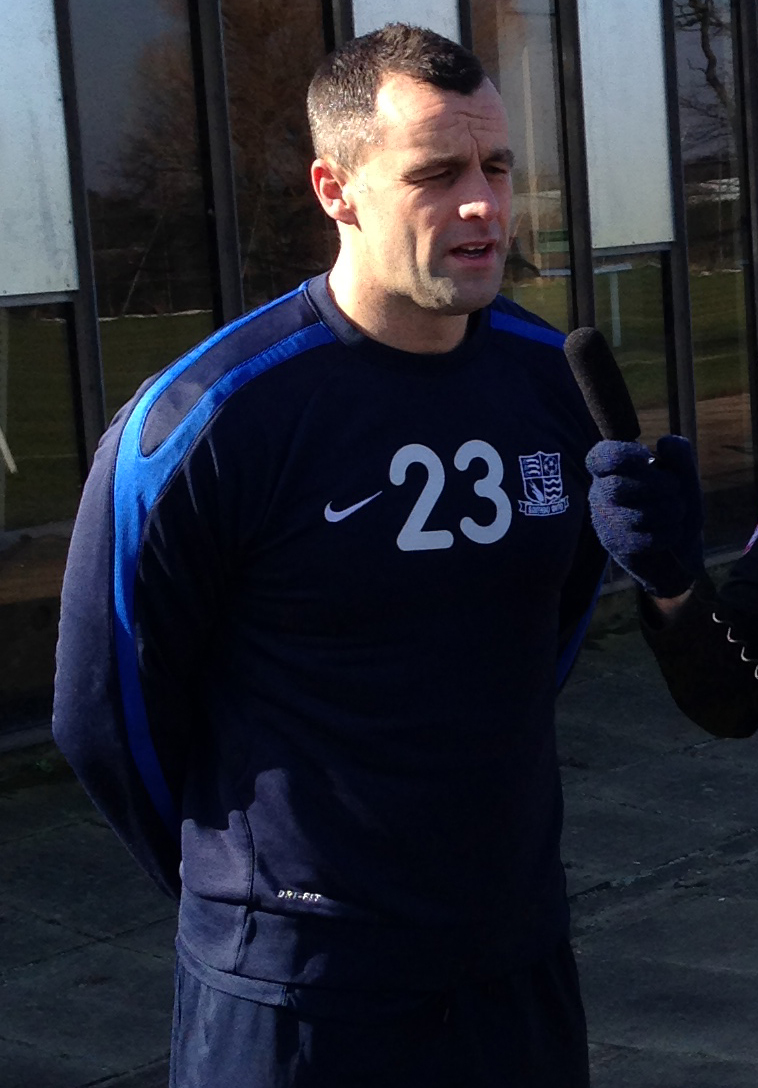
- Barker at Southend United in 2013

Personal information
- Full name: Christopher Andrew Barker
- Date of birth: 2 March 1980
- Place of birth: Sheffield, England
- Date of death: 1 January 2020 (aged 39)
- Place of death: Cardiff, Wales
- Height: 1.85 m (6 ft 1 in)
- Position: Defender

Youth career
- 1997–1999: Alfreton Town

Senior career*
Years	Team	Apps	(Gls)
1999–2002	Barnsley	113	(3)
2002–2007	Cardiff City	159	(0)
2004	→ Stoke City (loan)	4	(0)
2006–2007	→ Colchester United (loan)	38	(0)
2007–2008	Queens Park Rangers	25	(0)
2008–2010	Plymouth Argyle	54	(0)
2010	→ Southend United (loan)	4	(0)
2010–2013	Southend United	113	(0)
2013–2016	Aldershot Town	78	(0)
2016	Hereford	5	(0)
2016–2017	Weston-super-Mare	15	(0)
Total		608	(3)

Managerial career
- 2015: Aldershot Town (caretaker)
- * Club domestic league appearances and goals

Christopher Andrew Barker (2 March 1980 – 1 January 2020) was an English professional footballer who played as a defender. He represented Alfreton Town, Barnsley, Cardiff City, Stoke City, Colchester United, Queens Park Rangers, Plymouth Argyle, Southend United, Hereford FC and Weston Super Mare and he was player-manager of Aldershot Town for three months in 2015. His brother, Richie, is a retired professional footballer.

== Career ==
Barker was born in Sheffield, South Yorkshire. He began his professional career at Barnsley in 1999, winning the club's young player of the year award in his first full season. After beating competition for his place from Mateo Corbo, Barker was again awarded the club's young player of the year award, becoming the first player to win the award on two occasions. After appearing in over 100 games for the club, on 12 July 2002, 22-year-old Barker joined Cardiff City in a deal which was thought to be worth an initial £500,000, with an extra £100,000 if Cardiff achieved promotion.

After dropping down a division to sign for the club, Barker helped the team win promotion in his first year. He remained first-choice left back for the majority of the next few years, joining Stoke City on loan in August 2004 for three months only to be recalled after one, and was voted the Cardiff City supporters' player of the season in 2004–05. On 18 August 2006, Barker was signed on loan by Colchester United until January 2007. This was later extended until the end of the season. The move was not made permanent at the end of his loan spell, but he was regarded as a very popular and respected player with the fans at Layer Road. On 5 June 2007, Barker signed for Queens Park Rangers in a two-year deal, on a free transfer.

He signed for Championship rivals Plymouth Argyle on an emergency loan deal on 9 August 2008, allowing him to make his debut later that day against Wolverhampton Wanderers. The transfer was made permanent two days later, with Barker signing a three-year contract for an undisclosed fee. On 5 August 2010, Barker joined Southend United on loan for one month after being told he was surplus to requirements by Argyle manager Peter Reid. He signed a two-year contract with the club at the end of the month on a free transfer. On 30 April 2011, Barker was voted Southend's player of the year for the 2010–11 season. Having been vice-captain during his first season with the club, he was appointed captain ahead of the new campaign after the departure of Craig Easton. He scored his first goal for Southend as they were defeated by Crewe Alexandra in the 2011–12 League Two play-offs.

Barker left Southend on 9 August 2013 after his contract was terminated by mutual consent. He subsequently joined Aldershot Town the same day and made his debut for the Conference side the following day in a 1–1 draw with Grimsby Town.

In January 2015 Barker was appointed player-manager of Aldershot following the sacking of Andy Scott.

In June 2016, Barker signed for Hereford as a player-coach. In October 2016, he joined National League South side Weston-super-Mare as player/assistant manager to boss Scott Bartlett. Barker left Weston-super-Mare in July 2017.

== Death ==
On 1 January 2020, Barker was found dead at his home in the Cyncoed area of Cardiff at the age of 39. The cause of his death was not immediately revealed, but it was not treated as suspicious. It was later revealed that he had taken his own life.

== Career statistics ==
Appearances and goals by club, season and competition
Club	Season	League			FA Cup		League Cup		Other^{[A]}		Total	
Club	Season	Division	Apps	Goals	Apps	Goals	Apps	Goals	Apps	Goals	Apps	Goals
Barnsley	1999–2000	First Division	29	0	1	0	4	0	1	0	35	0
Barnsley	2000–01	First Division	40	0	1	0	5	0	0	0	46	0
Barnsley	2001–02	First Division	44	3	2	0	3	0	0	0	49	3
Barnsley	Total		113	3	4	0	12	0	1	0	130	3
Cardiff City	2002–03	Second Division	40	0	5	0	1	0	1	0	47	0
Cardiff City	2003–04	First Division	39	0	0	0	2	0	0	0	41	0
Cardiff City	2004–05	Championship	39	0	2	0	3	0	0	0	44	0
Cardiff City	2005–06	Championship	41	0	1	0	3	0	0	0	45	0
Cardiff City	2006–07	Championship	0	0	0	0	0	0	0	0	0	0
Cardiff City	Total		159	0	8	0	9	0	1	0	177	0
Stoke City (loan)	2004–05	Championship	4	0	0	0	0	0	0	0	4	0
Colchester United (loan)	2006–07	Championship	38	0	1	0	0	0	0	0	39	0
Queens Park Rangers	2007–08	Championship	25	0	1	0	0	0	0	0	26	0
Plymouth Argyle	2008–09	Championship	40	0	1	0	1	0	0	0	42	0
Plymouth Argyle	2009–10	Championship	14	0	2	0	0	0	0	0	16	0
Plymouth Argyle	2010–11	League One	0	0	0	0	0	0	0	0	0	0
Plymouth Argyle	Total		54	0	3	0	1	0	0	0	58	0
Southend United (loan)	2010–11	League Two	4	0	0	0	2	0	1	0	7	0
Southend United	2010–11	League Two	39	0	0	0	0	0	1	0	40	0
Southend United	2011–12	League Two	43	0	4	0	0	0	6	1	53	1
Southend United	2012–13	League Two	29	0	4	0	1	0	6	0	40	0
Southend United	Total		111	0	8	0	1	0	13	1	133	1
Aldershot Town	2013–14	Conference Premier	42	0	0	0	0	0	0	0	42	0
Aldershot Town	2014–15	Conference Premier	32	0	4	0	0	0	0	0	36	0
Aldershot Town	2015–16	Conference Premier	3	0	0	0	0	0	0	0	3	0
Aldershot Town	Total		77	0	4	0	0	0	0	0	81	0
Hereford	2016–17	Southern League Division One South & West	5	0	0	0	0	0	0	0	5	0
Weston-super-Mare	2016–17	National League South	15	0	0	0	0	0	0	0	15	0
Career total			605	3	29	0	25	0	16	1	675	4

A. The "Other" column constitutes appearances and goals in the Football League play-offs and the Football League Trophy.

== Honours ==
=== Player ===
Cardiff City

- Football League Second Division play-offs: 2003

Southend United

- Football League Trophy runner-up: 2012–13

Individual

- Cardiff City Player of the Year: 2004–05
- Southend United Player of the Year: 2010–11

Awards and achievements
Preceded by Tony Vidmar	Cardiff City Player of the Season; 2004–05	Succeeded by Jason Koumas
Preceded by Simon Francis	Southend United Player of the Year; 2010–11	Succeeded by Mark Phillips
