= Blair Sturrock =

Scottish footballer (born 1981)

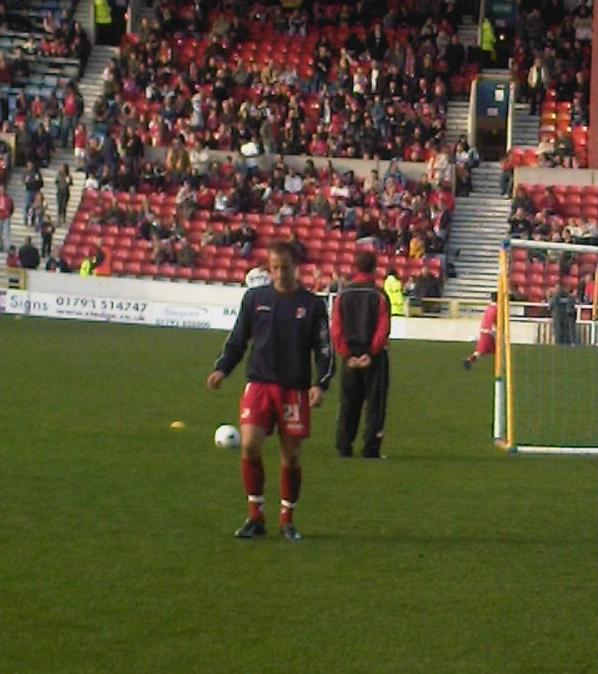
- Sturrock as a Swindon Town player

Personal information
- Full name: Blair David Sturrock
- Date of birth: 25 August 1981 (age 45)
- Place of birth: Dundee, Scotland
- Height: 6 ft 0 in (1.83 m)
- Position: Forward

Youth career
- 1998–2001: Dundee United

Senior career*
Years	Team	Apps	(Gls)
1998–2001	Dundee United	0	(0)
2000–2001	→ Brechin City (loan)	27	(6)
2001–2004	Plymouth Argyle	63	(2)
2004–2005	Kidderminster Harriers	22	(6)
2005–2006	Rochdale	31	(6)
2006–2009	Swindon Town	50	(6)
2008	→ AFC Bournemouth (loan)	4	(0)
2009	→ Torquay United (loan)	9	(2)
2009–2010	Mansfield Town	24	(3)
2010–2012	Southend United	52	(6)
2012–2013	Bishop's Stortford	12	(3)
2013	Basildon United	5	(12)
2013–2018	Victoria Highlanders	49	(10)
2024-Present	Cowichan 49ers Masters A	2	(1)
Total		350	(63)
- * Club domestic league appearances and goals

Blair David Sturrock (born 25 August 1981) is a Scottish former professional footballer who played as a forward. His previous clubs include Dundee United, Brechin City, Plymouth Argyle, Kidderminster Harriers, Rochdale, Swindon Town, AFC Bournemouth, Torquay United, Mansfield Town, Southend United. His father, Paul Sturrock, a former player who was a Scotland international was also the Manager of Southend United signing Blair and then ultimately releasing him.

== Career ==
=== Dundee United ===
Sturrock started off as a trainee for Dundee United before briefly going on loan to Brechin City in the 2000–01 season.

=== Plymouth Argyle ===
He then moved to Plymouth for three years and made 64 appearances for the club during the years 2001–2004, but mostly as a substitute. He scored two goals in his time at Plymouth.

=== Kidderminster Harriers ===
He then moved to Kidderminster Harriers in 2004 where he spent nine months, playing 22 games and scoring five goals.

=== Rochdale ===
Nine months after signing for Kidderminster he signed for Rochdale for the 2005–06 season where he made 33 appearances, scoring six goals in 15 starts for the club. He later got a knee injury that ended his spell at the club and was released. After being released by Rochdale, Sturrock had a short trial with Wrexham in July.

=== Swindon Town ===
In November 2006, Sturrock signed for Swindon Town the club his father was the manager of. Having overcome a groin injury, he made 25 appearances for the Wiltshire club in his first season scoring five goals, with 12 starts. Sturrock made his debut as a second-half substitute in a 2–1 defeat at Macclesfield Town on 23 December, his first goal coming in mid-January, when he netted within seconds of coming on to wrap up a 3–1 win at Boston. He then later signed a contract extension to take him through to the end of the 2008–09 season. He was released by Swindon in May 2009.

=== Mansfield Town ===
On 1 September 2009, Blair signed for Conference National outfit Mansfield Town after leaving Torquay United, signing on the first transfer deadline day of the 2009–10 football season. He made his debut as a substitute in the 1–1 draw with Grays Athletic on 5 September 2009.

=== Southend United ===
Sturrock signed for Southend United during the summer of 2010, the fourth time he has signed for a club managed by his father, Paul Sturrock. On 7 August, he made his debut, coming off the bench to score the equaliser in the fifth minute of injury time against Stockport County, in the 1–1 draw. On 25 September, Sturrock scored in a 3–1 win over Hereford United, and again in Southend's 1–0 win over Rotherham on 30 October. Sturrock scored a consolation goal in Southend's 3–1 defeat against Burton Albion. On 31 June 2011, Sturrock extended his contract with Southend until the end of the 2011–12 season.

On 18 May 2012, Sturrock was one of eleven players to be released at the end of their contract.

=== After Southend ===
On 16 October 2012 Blair signed for Conference North side, Bishop's Stortford. Following his spell at Bishop's Stortford, Sturrock joined Essex Senior League side Basildon United as Assistant Manager. For the 2013 summer season, Blair signed for the Victoria Highlanders of the North American USL PDL league, moving to Canada to be a player-coach for the club.

== Honours ==
Plymouth Argyle

- Football League Second Division: 2003–04
- Football League Third Division: 2001–02

Swindon Town

- Football League Two third-place promotion: 2006–07
