= 2010–11 Milton Keynes Dons F.C. season =

Milton Keynes Dons
2010–11 season
- Chairman: Pete Winkelman
- Manager: Karl Robinson
- League One: 5th (qualified for play-offs)
- FA Cup: First round
- League Cup: Third round
- League Trophy: Second round
- Top goalscorer: League: Sam Baldock (12); All: Sam Baldock (13)
- Highest home attendance: 12,662 (vs Peterborough United); 15 May 2011, League One play-offs
- Lowest home attendance: 3,502 (vs Dagenham & Redbridge); 10 August 2011, League Cup R1
- Average home league attendance: 8,512
- Biggest win: 1–4 (vs Rochdale); 5 March 2011, League One
- Biggest defeat: 4–1 (vs Huddersfield Town); 23 November 2010, League One; 1–4 (vs Sheffield Wednesday); 20 November 2010, League One; 4–1 (vs Carlisle United); 21 August 2010, League One
Home colours	Away colours	Third colours

The 2010–11 season was Milton Keynes Dons' seventh season in their existence as a professional association football club, and their third consecutive season competing in Football League One.

As well as competing in League One, the club also participated in the FA Cup, League Cup and League Trophy.

The season covers the period from 1 July 2010 to 30 June 2011.

== Competitions ==
=== League One ===
Final table

Pos	Team	Pld	W	D	L	GF	GA	GD	Pts
3	Huddersfield Town	46	25	12	9	77	48	+29	87
4	Peterborough United (P)	46	23	10	13	106	75	+31	79
5	Milton Keynes Dons	46	23	8	15	67	60	+7	77
6	Bournemouth	46	19	14	13	75	54	+21	71
7	Leyton Orient	46	19	13	14	71	62	+9	70

Source: Sky Sports

Matches

Win	Draw	Loss

Date	Opponent	Venue	Result	Scorers	Attendance	Ref
7 August 2010 – 15:00	Walsall	Away	2–1	S. Baldock, Woodards	4,034	
21 August 2010 – 15:00	Carlisle United	Away	1–4	Leven	5,205	
28 August 2010 – 15:00	Swindon Town	Home	2–1	S. Baldock (2)	7,866	
4 September 2010 – 15:00	Hartlepool United	Home	1–0	Guy	7,656	
11 September 2010 – 15:00	Brighton & Hove Albion	Away	0–2		6,683	
15 September 2010 – 19:45	Southampton	Home	2–0	Balanta, Leven	8,133	
18 September 2010 – 15:00	Rochdale	Home	1–1	Kouo-Doumbé	7,034	
25 September 2010 – 15:00	Peterborough United	Away	1–2	Lewington	7,838	
28 September 2010 – 19:45	Charlton Athletic	Away	0–1		13,155	
2 October 2010 – 15:00	Colchester United	Home	1–1	Balanta	11,280	
9 October 2010 – 15:00	Dagenham & Redbridge	Home	2–0	S. Baldock, Kouo-Doumbé	7,083	
16 October 2010 – 15:00	Bournemouth	Away	2–3	O'Hanlon, Leven	6,715	
23 October 2010 – 15:00	Exeter City	Home	1–0	Wilbraham	8,002	
30 October 2010 – 15:00	Tranmere Rovers	Away	2–4	Leven, S. Baldock	4,512	
2 November 2010 – 19:45	Yeovil Town	Home	3–2	Lewington, Johnson, Leven	7,281	
13 November 2010 – 15:00	Brentford	Away	2–0	Kouo-Doumbé, Balanta	4,789	
20 November 2010 – 15:00	Sheffield Wednesday	Home	1–4	Carrington	10,552	
23 November 2010 – 19:45	Huddersfield Town	Away	1–4	Wilbraham	12,773	
11 December 2010 – 15:00	Notts County	Away	0–2		5,172	
28 December 2010 – 15:00	Bournemouth	Home	2–0	Guy, Kouo-Doumbé	7,638	
1 January 2011 – 15:00	Bristol Rovers	Home	2–0	Powell, Leven	7,185	
3 January 2011 – 15:00	Yeovil Town	Away	0–1		3,508	
8 January 2011 – 15:00	Exeter City	Away	1–1	Ibehre	4,544	
15 January 2011 – 15:00	Tranmere Rovers	Home	2–0	Powell, Ibehre	8,014	
18 January 2011 – 19:45	Plymouth Argyle	Home	1–3	Bhasera (o.g.)	7,189	
22 January 2011 – 15:00	Dagenham & Redbridge	Away	1–0	Carrington	4,446	
25 January 2011 – 19:45	Leyton Orient	Away	2–2	Gleeson, O'Hanlon	3,131	
2 February 2011 – 19:45	Bristol Rovers	Away	2–1	O'Hanlon, Powell	4,829	
5 February 2011 – 15:00	Sheffield Wednesday	Away	2–2	Leven, Powell	17,631	
12 February 2011 – 15:00	Brentford	Home	1–1	Marsh-Brown	8,636	
15 February 2011 – 19:45	Leyton Orient	Home	2–3	Lewington, Ibehre	6,469	
19 February 2011 – 15:00	Hartlepool United	Away	1–0	Powell	2,620	
22 February 2011 – 19:45	Oldham Athletic	Home	0–0		7,806	
26 February 2011 – 15:00	Brighton & Hove Albion	Home	1–0	Powell	9,327	
5 March 2011 – 15:00	Rochdale	Away	4–1	Vine, Powell, Gleeson, S. Baldock	2,837	
8 March 2011 – 19:45	Charlton Athletic	Home	2–0	Powell, S. Baldock	7,026	
12 March 2011 – 15:00	Colchester United	Away	3–1	S. Baldock (3)	4,103	
21 March 2011 – 15:00	Peterborough United	Home	1–0	MacKenzie	10,019	
25 March 2011 – 19:45	Walsall	Home	1–1	Leven	8,923	
2 April 2011 – 15:00	Southampton	Away	2–3	MacKenzie, S. Baldock	22,377	
9 April 2011 – 15:00	Carlisle United	Home	3–2	Powell, Balanta, Clayton	10,795	
16 April 2011 – 15:00	Swindon Town	Away	1–0	O'Hanlon	8,305	
22 April 2011 – 15:00	Huddersfield Town	Home	1–3	Kouo-Doumbé	11,857	
25 April 2011 – 15:00	Plymouth Argyle	Away	0–1		8,553	
30 April 2011 – 15:00	Notts County	Home	2–1	S. Baldock, Balanta	10,013	
7 May 2011 – 15:00	Oldham Athletic	Away	2–1	Balanta, Marsh-Brown	4,063	

Play-offs

Date	Opponent	Venue	Result	Scorers	Attendance	Ref
15 May 2011 – 12:15	Peterborough United	Home	3–2	Powell, S. Baldock, Balanta	12,662	
19 May 2011 – 19:45	Peterborough United	Away	0–2		11,920	

=== FA Cup ===
Matches

Win	Draw	Loss

Date	Round	Opponent	Venue	Result	Scorers	Attendance	Ref
6 November 2010 – 15:00	First round	Stevenage	Away	0–0		2,956	
16 November 2010 – 19:45	First round (replay)	Stevenage	Home	1–1 (Note: After extra-time. 1–1 at the conclusion of 90 minutes. Stevenage won 7–6 on penalties.)	Guy	3,977	

=== League Cup ===
Matches

Win	Draw	Loss

Date	Round	Opponent	Venue	Result	Scorers	Attendance	Ref
10 August 2010 – 19:45	First round	Dagenham & Redbridge	Home	2–1	Ibehre (2)	3,502	
24 August 2010 – 19:45	Second round	Blackpool	Home	4–3 (Note: After extra-time. 3–3 at the conclusion of 90 minutes.)	S. Baldock, Easter (2), Guy	7,458	
21 September 2010 – 19:45	Third round	Birmingham City	Away	1–3	Wilbraham	9,450	

=== League Trophy ===
Matches

Win	Draw	Loss

Date	Round	Opponent	Venue	Result	Scorers	Attendance	Ref
5 October 2010 – 19:45	Second round	Charlton Athletic	Home	1–2	Chadwick	3,773	

== Player details ==
List of squad players, including number of appearances by competition.
Players with squad numbers struck through and marked † left the club during the playing season.

No.	Pos	Nat	Player	Total		League One		FA Cup		League Cup		Other (Note: Includes Football League Trophy and 2010–11 Football League One play-offs.)	
No.	Pos	Nat	Player	Apps	Goals	Apps	Goals	Apps	Goals	Apps	Goals	Apps	Goals
1	GK	(England) ENG	David Martin	51	0	43	0	2	0	3	0	3	0
2	DF	(England) ENG	Jude Stirling	4	0	4	0	0	0	0	0	0	0
3	DF	(England) ENG	Dean Lewington	50	3	42	3	2	0	3	0	3	0
4	DF	(France) FRA	Mathias Kouo-Doumbé	51	5	44	5	2	0	2	0	3	0
5	DF	(Scotland) SCO	Gary MacKenzie	30	2	26	2	1	0	1	0	2	0
6	DF	(England) ENG	Sean O'Hanlon	38	4	32	4	1	0	2	0	3	0
7	MF	(Republic of Ireland) IRL	Stephen Gleeson	40	2	36	2	2	0	0	0	2	0
~~8~~ †	FW	(England) ENG	David Amoo	3	0	3	0	0	0	0	0	0	0
~~8~~ †	FW	(Wales) WAL	Jermaine Easter	17	2	13	0	0	0	3	2	1	0
~~9~~ †	FW	(England) ENG	Aaron Wilbraham	12	3	10	2	0	0	1	1	1	0
9	FW	(England) ENG	Rowan Vine	17	1	17	1	0	0	0	0	0	0
10	FW	(England) ENG	Sam Baldock	36	14	30	12	2	0	2	1	2	1
11	FW	(Colombia) COL	Ángelo Balanta	25	7	18	6	1	0	3	0	3	1
~~12~~ †	GK	(France) FRA	Willy Guéret	0	0	0	0	0	0	0	0	0	0
~~13~~ †	MF	(England) ENG	Mark Carrington	18	2	12	2	2	0	3	0	1	0
14	MF	(England) ENG	Lewis Guy	41	4	34	2	2	1	3	1	2	0
15	DF	(England) ENG	Danny Woodards	43	1	37	1	2	0	3	0	1	0
16	MF	(England) ENG	Adam Clayton	8	1	6	1	0	0	0	0	2	0
~~16~~ †	MF	(Germany) GER	Dietmar Hamann	13	0	12	0	0	0	1	0	0	0
~~16~~ †	MF	(Scotland) SCO	Stephen Hughes	6	0	6	0	0	0	0	0	0	0
17	GK	(England) ENG	Stuart Searle	3	0	3	0	0	0	0	0	0	0
18	MF	(England) ENG	George Baldock	2	2	2	2	0	0	0	0	0	0
19	FW	(England) ENG	Jabo Ibehre	48	3	42	3	0	0	3	0	3	0
~~20~~ †	MF	(Scotland) SCO	Michael McIndoe	8	0	8	0	0	0	0	0	0	0
~~20~~ †	MF	(Cape Verde) CPV	Pelé	2	0	1	0	0	0	1	0	0	0
~~21~~ †	DF	(England) ENG	Luke Howell	3	0	1	0	0	0	1	0	1	0
21	FW	(England) ENG	Keanu Marsh-Brown	19	2	17	2	0	0	0	0	2	0
22	MF	(Scotland) SCO	Peter Leven	46	8	40	8	2	0	3	0	1	0
23	DF	(England) ENG	Adam Chicksen	15	0	14	0	0	0	1	0	0	0
24	DF	(Northern Ireland) NIR	Tom Flanagan	2	0	2	0	0	0	0	0	0	0
25	FW	(England) ENG	Charlie Collins	1	0	1	0	0	0	0	0	0	0
26	MF	(England) ENG	Luke Chadwick	52	1	44	0	2	0	3	0	3	1
27	FW	(England) ENG	Daniel Powell	31	10	28	9	1	0	0	0	2	1
~~28~~ †	FW	(United States) USA	Jemal Johnson	3	0	1	0	2	0	0	0	0	0
30	MF	(Brazil) BRA	Igor Coronado	0	0	0	0	0	0	0	0	0	0

== Transfers ==
=== Transfers in ===
Date from	Position	Name	From	Fee	Ref.
1 July 2010	FW	(England) Lewis Guy	Doncaster Rovers	Free transfer	
1 July 2010	MF	(Germany) Dietmar Hamann	Free agent (Note: Previous club: Manchester City.)	Free transfer	
1 July 2010	DF	(Scotland) Gary MacKenzie	(Scotland) Dundee	Free transfer	
1 July 2010	GK	(England) David Martin	Liverpool	Free transfer	
9 August 2010	DF	(Cape Verde) Pelé	Free agent (Note: Previous club: Falkirk.)	Free transfer	
16 March 2011	DF	(Republic of Ireland) Shaun Williams	Free agent (Note: Previous club: Sporting Fingal.)	Free transfer	

=== Transfers out ===
Date from	Position	Name	To	Fee	Ref.
1 July 2010	FW	(England) Lewis Gobern	Released (Note: Joined Grimsby Town on 1 July 2010.)		
2 July 2010	DF	(Scotland) David McCracken	Brentford	Undisclosed	
1 January 2011	FW	(England) Aaron Wilbraham	Norwich City	Undisclosed	
14 January 2011	FW	(Wales) Jermaine Easter	Crystal Palace	Undisclosed	
28 January 2011	MF	(England) Luke Howell	Lincoln City	Free transfer (Note: Mutual consent contract termination.)	
1 February 2011	GK	(France) Willy Guéret	Kettering Town	Free transfer	

=== Loans in ===
Start date	Position	Name	From	End date	Ref.
1 July 2010	FW	(Colombia) Ángelo Balanta	Queens Park Rangers	End of season	
15 January 2011	FW	(England) Rowan Vine	Queens Park Rangers	15 February 2011	
25 January 2011	FW	(England) David Amoo	Liverpool	23 February 2011	
31 January 2011	FW	(England) Keanu Marsh-Brown	Fulham	End of season (Note: Extended. Originally until end of February 2010.)	
10 February 2011	MF	(Scotland) Stephen Hughes	Norwich City	13 March 2011	
24 March 2011	MF	(England) Adam Clayton	Leeds United	End of season	

=== Loans out ===
Start date	Position	Name	To	End date	Ref.
16 September 2010	FW	(United States) Jemal Johnson	Port Vale	October 2010	
1 October 2010	FW	(England) Daniel Powell	Darlington	November 2010	
28 October 2010	MF	(England) Luke Howell	Lincoln City	January 2010 (Note: Originally until November 2010, later extended.)	
25 November 2010	FW	(Wales) Jermaine Easter	(Wales) Swansea City	13 January 2011 (Note: Recalled. Originally until 31 January 2010.)	
3 January 2011	FW	(England) Charlie Collins	Kettering Town	3 February 2011	
3 January 2011	DF	(Northern Ireland) Tom Flanagan	Kettering Town	3 March 2011 (Note: Extended. Originally until 3 February 2011.)	
24 March 2011	DF	(England) Jude Stirling	Barnet	End of season	
