= Adam Chicksen =

Zimbabwean footballer (born 1991)

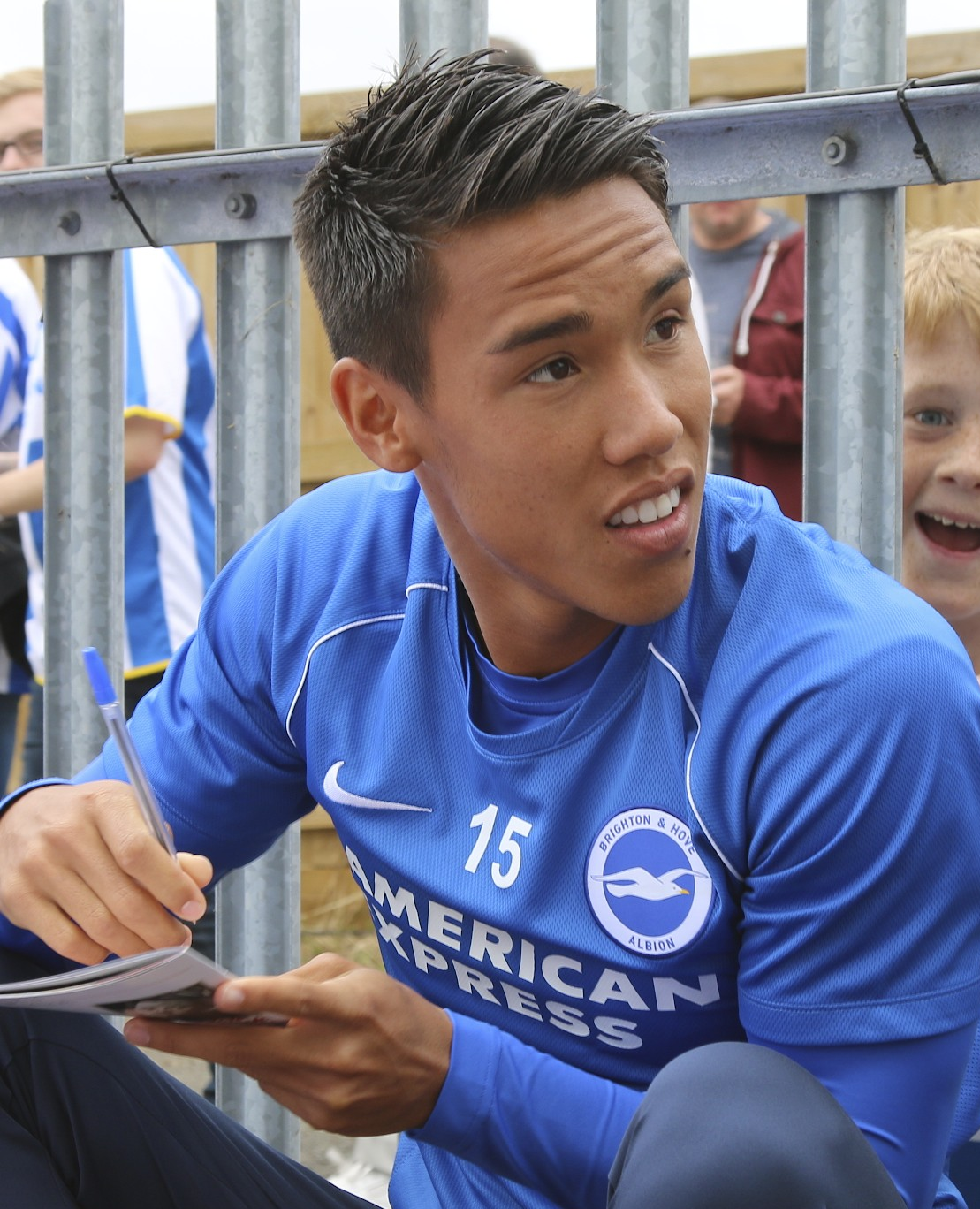

Personal information
- Full name: Adam Thomas Chicksen
- Date of birth: 27 September 1991 (age 35)
- Place of birth: Milton Keynes, England
- Position: Left-back

Youth career
- 2006–2008: Milton Keynes Dons

Senior career*
| Years | Team | Apps | (Gls) |
| 2008–2013 | Milton Keynes Dons | 76 | (2) |
| 2012 | → Leyton Orient (loan) | 3 | (0) |
| 2013–2016 | Brighton & Hove Albion | 6 | (0) |
| 2014 | → Gillingham (loan) | 3 | (0) |
| 2015 | → Fleetwood Town (loan) | 13 | (0) |
| 2015 | → Leyton Orient (loan) | 6 | (0) |
| 2016 | → Gillingham (loan) | 6 | (0) |
| 2016–2017 | Charlton Athletic | 21 | (1) |
| 2017–2019 | Bradford City | 46 | (0) |
| 2019–2020 | Bolton Wanderers | 16 | (0) |
| 2020–2025 | Notts County | 115 | (10) |
| 2024–2025 | → Woking (loan) | 26 | (0) |
| 2025–2026 | Bedford Town | 3 | (0) |
| Total | | 339 | (13) |

International career^{‡}
| 2018 | Zimbabwe | 2 | (0) |
- * Club domestic league appearances and goals as of 19:50, 29 April 2026 (UTC) ‡ National team caps and goals as of 20:32, 1 November 2023 (UTC)

Adam Thomas Chicksen (born 27 September 1991) is a former professional footballer who played as a defender. Born in England, he represented the Zimbabwe national team.

== Early and personal life ==
Chicksen is of English and Chinese descent. He attended St Paul's Catholic School.

In March 2019, Chicksen became a first time father, which saw him miss a match against Portsmouth on 2 March 2019.

== Club career ==
=== Milton Keynes Dons ===
Chicksen joined the Milton Keynes Dons' academy from John College as a 14-year-old in July 2006 and was handed a two-year scholarship at the start of the 2008–09 season. While progressing through the Milton Keynes Dons' academy, he was a ball boy, "recalling doing plenty of fetching and carrying during MK's earliest days".

Chicksen debuted for the Milton Keynes Dons's first team in a pre-season match against Reading on 19 July 2008. His first league match was against Leicester City on 9 August 2008, coming on as a 74th-minute substitute, in a 2–0 loss. His second appearance came a week later on 22 August 2008, starting the whole game, in a 2–1 loss against Cardiff City. Following this, he returned to the reserve team to develop for the rest of the 2008–09 season, as he made two appearances for the side in all competitions.

Having spent most of the 2009–10 season at the substitute bench, Chicksen made his first appearance of the season, starting a match before being substituted in the 81st minute, in a 1–0 loss against Charlton Athletic on 3 April 2010. Following this, he made five more appearances later in the season, including three starts. At the end of the 2009–10 season, Chicksen went on to make six appearances for the side in all competitions. Following this, he signed his first professional contract on a two-year deal with the club. After this, Chicksen expressed his delight at signing the contract.

At the start of the 2010–11 season, Chicksen started out the season, appearing on the substitute bench. His first appearance of the season came on 10 August 2010, coming on as a 31st-minute substitute, in a 2–1 win against Dagenham & Redbridge in the first round of the League Cup. For the several months, Chicksen found himself in and out of the starting eleven, which he saw him placed on the substitute bench in a number of matches. Despite this, he made fourteen appearances in all competitions for the 2010–11 season. Following this, Chicksen signed another contract with the club.

In the opening game of the 2011–12 season, Chicksen made his first start of the season, in a 2–2 draw against Hartlepool United. He was involved in the first team for the next two months, featuring in and out of the starting line-up. However, Chicksen soon lost his first team place as a left back to Dean Lewington and was loaned out to Leyton Orient on a one-month loan on 1 January 2012. He impressed on his first game for the O's as they beat Stevenage 1–0. After making three appearances for Leyton Orient, Chicksen made his return to Milton Keynes Dons. Despite making only three appearances for Leyton Orient, Chicksen described playing for them as a "great experience to the footballing world having not been away from the Dons before". After his loan spell at Leyton Orient came to an end, his first appearance back at Milton Keynes Dons came on 31 January 2012 against Sheffield Wednesday, starting a match before being substituted in the 50th minute, in a 1–1 draw. After spending the next months on the substitute bench, Chicksen made a return to the first team at right-back. He helped the side keep three clean sheets between 9 April 2012 and 21 April 2012 against Tranmere Rovers, Scunthorpe United and Sheffield United (which resulted in Milton Keynes Dons reached the play-off places). Chicksen played in both legs of League One play-offs semi-finals against Huddersfield Town, where he assisted the first goal of the play-off semi-final, but it was not enough as Milton Keynes Dons lost 3–2 on aggregate. At the end of the season, Chicksen's contract with MK Dons was activated on a 12-month option.

In the 2012–13 season, Chicksen's display as a right-back earned him a place in the League One Team of the Week in the opening game of the season, which saw Milton Keynes Dons beat Oldham Athletic 2–0. He continued to feature in the first team, playing in the full–backs position despite facing competitions along the way. On 13 November 2012, Chicksen scored his first senior goal in the FA Cup first round replay against Cambridge City. Over times halfway through the 2012–13 season, he began to play in the left–midfield position. On 23 February 2013, Chicksen scored his first league goal in a League One fixture against Carlisle United, in a 1–1 draw. He scored his second league goal in the following week against Preston North End, smashing home from close range, in a 1–1 draw. For his performance throughout the 2012–13 season, he was awarded the club's SET Community Ambassador of the Year and the club's Young Player of the Year. Despite missing the remaining three matches of the 2012–13 season, Chicksen went on to make forty–two appearances and scoring three times in all competitions. He was offered a new contract with the club. However, after weeks of negotiations, Chicksen's future remained uncertain despite Manager Karl Robinson's confidence of keeping him at the club.

=== Brighton & Hove Albion ===
On 14 July 2013, Chicksen signed a three-year contract with Brighton & Hove Albion on a free transfer. However, Chicksen's age at the time led Brighton & Hove Albion to pay an undisclosed compensation fee to MK Dons. On his move to Brighton, Chicksen was given the number 15 shirt.

Chicksen's debut was delayed because of an ankle injury sustained in a pre-season friendly, and he made his return from injury, playing for the club's development squad against Swansea City's development squad on 19 August 2013. Chicksen made his league debut for the club on 30 December 2013, coming on as a substitute for Stephen Ward who had sustained a concussion during the match, in a 1–0 win over Blackpool. After the match, Chicksen reflected on his Brighton & Hove Albion's debut, saying he had waited for a long time. Chicksen subsequently made another appearance, making his first start, in the Championship play-off semi final second leg, in a 2–1 loss against Derby County. Chicksen ended his first season with five appearances in all competitions.

At the start of the 2014–15 season, Chicksen's playing time increased in the first team, making three appearances. However, his first team opportunities was limited, due to the arrival of Joe Bennett, who took his place as first-choice left-back. On 21 October 2014 Chicksen made another appearance for the side, in a 1–1 draw against Huddersfield Town, taking Bennet's place because of his absence. Chicksen made his first Brighton appearance on 12 December 2014 since his loan at Gillingham, in a 1–0 defeat to Millwall. At the end of the 2014–15 season, he went on to make ten appearances for the side.

In the 2015–16 season, Chicksen's first team opportunities at Brighton & Hove Albion continued to be limited and was sent to the club's development squad as a result. He made his only appearance for the side of the season, coming on as a late substitute, in a 3–2 win against Charlton Athletic on 5 December 2015. At the end of the 2015–16 season, Chicksen was released by the club.

==== Loan Spells from Brighton & Hove Albion ====
With his first team opportunities limited, Chicksen joined Gillingham on a one-month loan deal on 15 November 2014. Chicksen made his debut for the club the same day, making his first start as a left back in a 3–2 win over Leyton Orient. He made three more starts for the side, which two were draws and one was wins. After making four appearances for the club, Chicksen's loan spell with Gillingham came to an end.

On 27 February 2015, Chicksen joined Fleetwood Town on a month's loan. He made his Fleetwood Town debut the next day, starting the whole game, in a 3–0 loss against Chesterfield. Chicksen quickly became a first team regular for the side, playing in the left–back position for the rest of the season. Having made five appearances by 1 April 2015, Chicksen's loan spell with Fleetwood Town was extended until the end of the season. At the end of the 2014–15 season, he went on to make thirteen appearances for the side.

On 2 October 2015, Chicksen joined Leyton Orient on a one-month loan deal, the second time he had been on loan at the club. He made his second Leyton Orient debut the following day, starting the whole game in the left–back position, in a 3–1 win against Notts County. Chicksen returned to Brighton on 2 November, having made six appearances for Orient.

On 27 January 2016, Chicksen signed for League 1 side Gillingham on a one-month loan deal, the second time he had been on loan at the club. He made his Gillingham debut on 30 January 2016, starting a match before being substituted in the 70th minute, in a 1–0 loss against Blackpool. Chicksen received a handful of first team appearances in the absence of Bradley Garmston and his performance saw his loan extended for another month. However, Garmston's return led Chicksen lost his first team opportunities and his loan spell at the club ended on 17 March 2016 after suffering from an injury. He went on to make six appearances for Gillingham at the end of the 2015–16 season.

=== Charlton Athletic ===
On 30 August 2016, Chicksen joined League One club Charlton Athletic on a free transfer. Chicksen made his Charlton Athletic debut later the same day, coming on as a 66th-minute substitute, and helped the side beat Southampton on penalties in the EFL League Trophy. He then made his first starts for the side, starting the whole game, in a 2–0 loss against Crawley Town on 4 October 2016.

However, Chicksen found his first team opportunities limited, due to a competition in the defence. He scored his first goal for the club in a 5–1 away win at Bristol Rovers on 22 November 2016. Four weeks later on 13 December 2016, Chicksen scored his second goal for the club, in a 3–1 loss against his former club, Milton Keynes Dons, in the second round replay of the FA Cup. Following this, Chicksen received a handful of first team football for the next two months. At the end of the 2016–17 season, he went on to make twenty–five appearances and scoring two times in all competitions. However, on 11 May 2017, it was confirmed that Chicksen was not being offered a new contract by Charlton Athletic.

=== Bradford City ===
Chicksen signed for League One club Bradford City on 19 June 2017 on a two-year contract. Upon joining the club, he was given a number three shirt.

Chicksen made his Bradford City debut, starting the match, but came off as a 23rd-minute substitute after suffering an injury during the match, in a 2–1 win against Blackpool in the opening game of the season. As a result, he was sidelined for six weeks. On 2 September 2017 Chicksen returned to the starting line-up, playing the whole of a 3–1 against Bristol Rovers. However, his return was short–lived when he was sent–off for a second bookable offence, in a 3–1 against Peterborough United on 9 September 2017, resulting a one match suspension. He returned to the starting line-up from suspension, starting the whole game and kept a clean sheet, in a 1–0 win against Rotherham United on 16 September 2017. Chicksen kept another clean sheet, in a follow–up match, in a 1–0 win against Northampton Town. He started three more matches for the side before suffering a thigh injury that kept him out for three months. On 27 January 2018 Chicksen played the whole of a 4–0 defeat against AFC Wimbledon. He appeared in the next four matches since returning to the first team before losing his first team place for the rest of the season. In his first season at Bradford City, he went on to make eighteen appearances in all competitions.

At the start of the 2018–19 season, Chicksen started the season when he became first team regular for the side, playing in the midfield position before returning to the left–back position. During a 2–0 loss against Barnsley on 11 August 2018, he suffered a head wound, but was quickly fit. However, Chicksen suffered a leg injury that kept him out for two months. On 3 November 2018 Chicksen returned to the starting line-up against Portsmouth, but was sent–off in the 83rd minute for a second bookable offence, in a 1–0 loss. Since returning from a one match suspension, he received regular playing time for the next two months. During this run, Chicksen helped the club keep two clean sheets in a row on two separate occasions; which the first one came between 15 December 2018 and 22 December 2018 and the second one came on between 29 December 2018 and 1 January 2019. In a follow–up match against Barnsley, he was sent–off in the 89th minute for a foul on Jacob Brown, in a 3–0 loss and served a two match suspension as a result. After serving a two match suspension, Chicksen continued to fight for his first team place in the left–back position, alongside Calum Woods and Connor Wood. However, he lost his first team place later in the season, due to being dropped from the squad and his own injury concerns; Bradford City was relegated to League Two. At the end of the 2018–19 season, Chicksen went on to make thirty–three appearances in all competitions.

In May 2019, following Bradford City's relegation to League Two, it was announced that he would leave the club upon the expiry of his contract on 30 June 2019, one of 11 players to be released.

=== Bolton Wanderers ===
On 14 September 2019, Chickson signed a short-term contract until January with EFL League One side Bolton Wanderers and made his debut the same day, as he started in a 6–1 defeat against Rotherham United.

Since joining Bolton Wanderers, Chicksen quickly became a first team regular for the side, playing in the left–back position throughout his time at the club. During which, Chicksen kept four clean sheets for the side, in which he started all the matches. His performance led to potential talks over a new contract beyond January. However, Chicksen was released at the end of his contract on 13 January 2020. After the match, he spoke out his release, saying: "I think from day one I knew in my own mind there was nothing concrete. My contract had a date on it and it was up to me to perform as well as I possibly could to get a new one. I didn't speak much to the club beforehand. My mindset was just on delivering performances."

=== Notts County ===
On 10 September 2020, after 8 months as a free agent, Adam Chicksen signed for National League club Notts County. Chicksen signed a new one-year contract in June 2022. He started for Notts County in the 2023 National League play-off final as the club won promotion by defeating Chesterfield on penalties. His performances during the 2022–23 season earned him a place in the league's Team of the Year.

On 5 October 2024, Chicksen returned to the National League to join Woking on loan. He made regular appearances for Woking, however he had to return to Notts County two games before the end of the season due to rupturing both his anterior cruciate ligament and medial collateral ligament in a game against Aldershot.

On 20 May 2025, Notts County said the player would be released in June when his contract expired.

=== Bedford Town ===
On 6 December 2025, Chicksen joined National League North club Bedford Town having undergone his injury rehabilitation with the club.

Having suffered a career-ending injury, he announced his retirement in April 2026.

== International career ==
On 13 March 2018, Chicksen received his first international call up for Zimbabwe, which he qualifies for through his father. He made his debut for the side on 21 March 2018 in a penalty shootout defeat to Zambia. After spending a year without being called up, Chicksen finally obtained his Zimbabwe passports in November 2019.

== Career statistics ==
As of end of 2025–26 season

Appearances and goals by club, season and competition
| Club | Season | League | | | FA Cup | | League Cup | | Other | | Total | |
| Club | Season | Division | Apps | Goals | Apps | Goals | Apps | Goals | Apps | Goals | Apps | Goals |
|---|---|---|---|---|---|---|---|---|---|---|---|---|
| Milton Keynes Dons | 2008–09 | League One | 1 | 0 | 0 | 0 | 1 | 0 | 1 (Note: Appearance in Football League Trophy) | 0 | 3 | 0 |
| Milton Keynes Dons | 2009–10 | League One | 6 | 0 | 0 | 0 | 0 | 0 | 0 | 0 | 6 | 0 |
| Milton Keynes Dons | 2010–11 | League One | 14 | 0 | 0 | 0 | 1 | 0 | 0 | 0 | 15 | 0 |
| Milton Keynes Dons | 2011–12 | League One | 23 | 0 | 2 | 0 | 2 | 0 | 3 (Note: One appearance in Football League Trophy, two appearances in Football League One play-offs) | 0 | 30 | 0 |
| Milton Keynes Dons | 2012–13 | League One | 32 | 2 | 6 | 1 | 3 | 0 | 1 | 0 | 42 | 3 |
| Milton Keynes Dons | Total | | 76 | 2 | 8 | 1 | 7 | 0 | 5 | 0 | 96 | 3 |
| Leyton Orient (loan) | 2011–12 | League One | 3 | 0 | 0 | 0 | 0 | 0 | 0 | 0 | 3 | 0 |
| Brighton & Hove Albion | 2013–14 | Championship | 1 | 0 | 3 | 0 | 0 | 0 | 1 (Note: Appearance in Football League Championship play-offs) | 0 | 5 | 0 |
| Brighton & Hove Albion | 2014–15 | Championship | 5 | 0 | 1 | 0 | 4 | 0 | 0 | 0 | 10 | 0 |
| Brighton & Hove Albion | 2015–16 | Championship | 0 | 0 | 0 | 0 | 0 | 0 | 0 | 0 | 0 | 0 |
| Brighton & Hove Albion | Total | | 6 | 0 | 4 | 0 | 4 | 0 | 1 | 0 | 15 | 0 |
| Gillingham (loan) | 2014–15 | League One | 3 | 0 | 0 | 0 | 0 | 0 | 1 | 0 | 4 | 0 |
| Fleetwood Town (loan) | 2014–15 | League One | 13 | 0 | 0 | 0 | 0 | 0 | 0 | 0 | 13 | 0 |
| Leyton Orient (loan) | 2015–16 | League Two | 6 | 0 | 0 | 0 | 0 | 0 | 0 | 0 | 6 | 0 |
| Gillingham (loan) | 2015–16 | League One | 6 | 0 | 0 | 0 | 0 | 0 | 0 | 0 | 6 | 0 |
| Charlton Athletic | 2016–17 | League One | 21 | 1 | 1 | 1 | 0 | 0 | 3 (Note: Appearance(s) in EFL Trophy) | 0 | 25 | 2 |
| Bradford City | 2017–18 | League One | 18 | 0 | 0 | 0 | 0 | 0 | 0 | 0 | 18 | 0 |
| Bradford City | 2018–19 | League One | 28 | 0 | 3 | 0 | 1 | 0 | 1 | 0 | 33 | 0 |
| Bradford City | Total | | 46 | 0 | 3 | 0 | 1 | 0 | 1 | 0 | 51 | 0 |
| Bolton Wanderers | 2019–20 | League One | 16 | 0 | 1 | 0 | 0 | 0 | 3 | 0 | 20 | 0 |
| Notts County | 2020–21 | National League | 19 | 0 | 0 | 0 | — | | 6 (Note: Four appearances in FA Trophy and two in National League play-offs) | 1 | 25 | 1 |
| Notts County | 2021–22 | National League | 31 | 0 | 3 | 0 | — | | 2 (Note: One appearance in FA Trophy and one appearance in National League play-offs) | 0 | 36 | 0 |
| Notts County | 2022–23 | National League | 44 | 10 | 0 | 0 | — | | 3 (Note: One appearance in FA Trophy and two appearances in National League play-offs) | 1 | 47 | 11 |
| Notts County | 2023–24 | League Two | 19 | 0 | 1 | 0 | 1 | 0 | 1 | 0 | 22 | 0 |
| Notts County | 2024–25 | League Two | 2 | 0 | 0 | 0 | 1 | 0 | 1 | 0 | 4 | 0 |
| Notts County | Total | | 115 | 10 | 4 | 0 | 2 | 0 | 13 | 2 | 134 | 12 |
| Woking (loan) | 2024–25 | National League | 26 | 0 | 2 | 0 | — | | 6 (Note: Four appearances in FA Trophy; Two appearances in National League Cup) | 0 | 34 | 0 |
| Bedford Town | 2025–26 | National League North | 3 | 0 | 0 | 0 | — | | 0 | 0 | 3 | 0 |
| Career total | | | 339 | 13 | 23 | 2 | 14 | 0 | 34 | 2 | 410 | 17 |

== Honours ==
Notts County

- National League play-offs: 2023

Individual

- Milton Keynes Dons Young Player of the Year: 2012–13
- National League Team of the Year: 2022–23
