= Luke Chadwick =

English footballer and coach

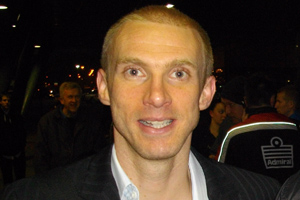
- Chadwick in 2011

Personal information
- Full name: Luke Harry Chadwick
- Date of birth: 18 November 1980 (age 45)
- Place of birth: Cambridge, England
- Height: 1.77 m (5 ft 10 in)
- Position: Midfielder

Youth career
- 1997–1999: Manchester United

Senior career*
Years	Team	Apps	(Gls)
1999–2004	Manchester United	25	(2)
2000	→ Royal Antwerp (loan)	26	(7)
2003	→ Reading (loan)	15	(1)
2003–2004	→ Burnley (loan)	36	(5)
2004–2006	West Ham United	32	(1)
2005–2006	→ Stoke City (loan)	24	(1)
2006–2007	Stoke City	27	(4)
2006	→ Norwich City (loan)	1	(1)
2007–2009	Norwich City	16	(1)
2008	→ Milton Keynes Dons (loan)	7	(3)
2009–2014	Milton Keynes Dons	201	(14)
2014	→ Cambridge United (loan)	8	(2)
2014–2015	Cambridge United	22	(1)
2015–2016	Soham Town Rangers	18	(0)
Total		460	(43)

International career
1998–1999	England U18	4	(0)
1999–2001	England U21	13	(0)
- * Club domestic league appearances and goals

Luke Harry Chadwick (born 18 November 1980) is an English former professional footballer who played as a midfielder.

Chadwick began his career at Manchester United where he made 25 Premier League appearances in four seasons. While at Old Trafford he spent time out on loan at Reading and Burnley before joining West Ham United on a permanent basis in the summer of 2004.

A year later, he joined Stoke City on loan before making the move permanent in January 2006. He remained at Stoke until November 2006 making 55 appearances before joining Norwich City. Injuries restricted his time at Carrow Road and he moved to Milton Keynes Dons in October 2008. In March 2014, Chadwick joined Cambridge United, the club he supported as a child. He was released at the end of the 2014–15 season.

== Club career ==
=== Manchester United ===
Born in Cambridge, Chadwick had a three-week trial at his local club Cambridge United at the age of 10. After a spell at Arsenal, he was signed to the Manchester United youth system. He made his professional debut on 13 October 1999 in the third round of the League Cup as a young United side lost 3–0 at Aston Villa. After loans at Royal Antwerp in Belgium, he made his Premier League debut on 11 November 2000 in a 2–1 home win over Middlesbrough as an added-time substitute for Dwight Yorke. On 17 December, he came on in the 80th minute for Denis Irwin at home to Liverpool and was sent off for a foul on Vladimír Šmicer in a 1–0 loss. He scored two league goals in the title-winning 2000–01 season, one in a 3–0 win at Bradford City on 13 January 2001 and the other on 3 March in a 1–1 draw at Leeds United.

After playing rarely for United in 18 months, Chadwick went on a one-month loan to First Division team Reading in February 2003. He was inspired by Arsenal's Matthew Upson increasing his standing by making the same move. On his debut for the Royals on 10 February, he equalised in a 2–1 home win over Gillingham. His deal was extended until the end of the season. He helped the club to the play-off semi-finals, where they were ousted by eventually promoted Wolverhampton Wanderers.

In July 2003, Chadwick was loaned for the season to First Division side Burnley. He missed pre-season due to two jaw operations as part of a two-year treatment. In 40 total games he scored six goals, including two in a 4–0 win over Bradford on 20 September; after that game, he conceded that he may have to leave United.

=== West Ham United ===
On 2 August 2004, Chadwick moved to West Ham United of the newly renamed Championship on a free transfer. He was signed by Alan Pardew, who had led him at Reading. In his only season, he scored a goal on 10 December to open a 1–1 home draw with Leeds.

=== Stoke City ===
Chadwick joined Stoke City on loan at the start of the 2005–06 season. On 4 January 2006, the transfer was made permanent for a fee of £100,000, on a deal lasting until the summer of 2008 with the option of one more year.

In the season opener away to Southend United on 6 August 2006, Chadwick was carried off after collapsing. It was confirmed that he was suffering only from dehydration.

=== Norwich City ===
On 13 November 2006, Chadwick signed on loan for Norwich City until 3 January; he was signed by Peter Grant, who had worked with him at Reading and West Ham. On his debut six days later, he opened the scoring in a 3–1 loss at rivals Ipswich Town. He suffered a knee injury in that match, ruling him out until March. After his loan ended, he signed a 2 1/2-year deal for a £200,000 fee. He said that his transfer was due to his wife and children returning to Cambridge.

His injury problems continued into the following season as he struggled for fitness.

=== Milton Keynes Dons ===
On 1 October 2008, Chadwick was loaned to League One club Milton Keynes Dons for three months. He scored three goals in the eight games of his loan, including a brace on 28 October in a 2–1 win at Leyton Orient. He returned to Norwich in the middle of November due to a knee injury. He moved permanently on a 2 1/2-year deal at the turn of the year, on a free transfer.

Chadwick was MK Dons' Player of the Season for 2009–10 and 2010–11, with the latter season ending in a 4–3 aggregate elimination in the playoff semi-finals by Peterborough United. In March 2011, his contract was extended by two more years. On 23 August that year, he scored twice in a 4–0 win at former club Norwich in the League Cup second round. A year and five days later, he did the same at the same stage in a 2–1 home win over Blackburn Rovers.

In March 2013, Chadwick signed a further two-year extension to his MK Dons deal.

=== Cambridge United ===
On 18 March 2014 Chadwick joined his hometown club Cambridge United on loan. He made his debut the same day in a 2–1 home win against Welling United in the Conference National. He signed permanently on 7 June, after the team won promotion in the play-off final against Gateshead.

In 2014–15, Chadwick played a part in Cambridge's run in the FA Cup, scoring in their 2–2 home draw with Mansfield Town in the second round. In the fourth round against his former club Manchester United, he played in a goalless home draw and a 3–0 replay loss on his return to Old Trafford; both sets of fans gave him a standing ovation when he was substituted in the latter game. At the end of the season he was released.

=== Soham Town Rangers and move into coaching ===
After leaving Cambridge United, Chadwick signed for Isthmian League Division One North side Soham Town Rangers in November 2015. He spent one season at Soham before returning to Cambridge as a full-time coach in the club's academy.

== International career ==
Chadwick made his debut for the England under-21s in the win against Luxembourg in September 1999. He played the full 90 minutes as England won 5−0 in the 2000 UEFA European Under-21 Championship qualifier at the Madejski Stadium. England qualified for the finals in Slovakia and Chadwick made substitute appearances against Italy and Slovakia as they were eliminated at the group stages. He featured four times during England's qualifying campaign for 2002 UEFA European Under-21 Championship with his last appearance coming in the 5−0 win against Albania on 4 September 2001. Overall, Chadwick made 13 appearances for the U21s but scored no goals.

== Personal life ==
Chadwick and his wife Hayley have two sons. As of 2015, both were in the youth ranks of Cambridge United.

From 2016, Chadwick began mentoring young footballers, and in August 2023 was praised by England women's footballer Georgia Stanway for his help.

Chadwick's childhood fear of dentists prevented the fitting of braces to repair his overbite. In May 2020, he spoke about how his mental health had been affected by abuse about his appearance he had received as a young player. He highlighted how the media had made fun of his appearance, "spots on my face, teeth sticking out, that sort of thing", making particular mention of the abuse he had received on the BBC panel show They Think It's All Over. He received an apology from the show's hosts Nick Hancock and Gary Lineker.

In May 2025, Chadwick released an autobiography called Not Just a Pretty Face talking about his football career, personal life and mental health struggles.

== Career statistics ==
Appearances and goals by club, season and competition
Club	Season	League			National Cup		League Cup		Other		Total	
Club	Season	Division	Apps	Goals	Apps	Goals	Apps	Goals	Apps	Goals	Apps	Goals
Manchester United	1999–2000	Premier League	0	0	—		1	0	0	0	1	0
Manchester United	2000–01	Premier League	16	2	1	0	2	0	3 (Note: Appearances in UEFA Champions League)	0	22	2
Manchester United	2001–02	Premier League	8	0	2	0	1	0	0	0	11	0
Manchester United	2002–03	Premier League	1	0	0	0	1	0	3	0	5	0
Manchester United	Total		25	2	3	0	5	0	6	0	39	2
Royal Antwerp (loan)	1999–2000	Belgian Second Division	18	5	0	0	—		—		18	5
Royal Antwerp (loan)	2000–01	Belgian Pro League	8	2	0	0	—		—		8	2
Royal Antwerp (loan)	Total		26	7	0	0	—		—		26	7
Reading (loan)	2002–03	First Division	15	1	0	0	0	0	2 (Note: Appearances in First Division play-offs)	0	17	1
Burnley (loan)	2003–04	First Division	36	5	2	0	2	1	—		40	6
West Ham United	2004–05	Championship	32	1	3	0	1	0	0	0	36	1
Stoke City	2005–06	Championship	36	2	4	1	0	0	—		40	3
Stoke City	2006–07	Championship	15	3	0	0	0	0	—		15	3
Stoke City	Total		51	5	4	1	0	0	—		55	6
Norwich City	2006–07	Championship	4	1	0	0	0	0	—		4	1
Norwich City	2007–08	Championship	13	1	0	0	1	0	—		14	1
Norwich City	Total		17	2	0	0	1	0	—		18	2
Milton Keynes Dons	2008–09	League One	24	6	0	0	0	0	3 (Note: Two Appearances in League One play-offs and one in Football League Trophy)	0	27	6
Milton Keynes Dons	2009–10	League One	40	2	3	0	1	0	4 (Note: Appearances in Football League Trophy)	0	48	2
Milton Keynes Dons	2010–11	League One	44	0	2	0	3	0	3	1	52	1
Milton Keynes Dons	2011–12	League One	42	2	3	0	3	2	2 (Note: One Appearance in League One play-offs and one in Football League Trophy)	1	50	5
Milton Keynes Dons	2012–13	League One	36	6	3	0	3	2	1	0	43	8
Milton Keynes Dons	2013–14	League One	22	1	1	1	2	0	1	0	26	2
Milton Keynes Dons	Total		208	17	12	1	12	4	14	2	246	24
Cambridge United	2013–14	Conference Premier	8	2	0	0	0	0	2 (Note: Appearances in Conference Premier play-offs)	0	10	2
Cambridge United	2014–15	League Two	22	1	6	1	1	0	1	0	30	2
Cambridge United	Total		30	3	6	1	1	0	3	0	40	4
Career total			440	43	30	3	22	5	25	2	517	53

== Honours ==
Royal Antwerp

- Belgian Second Division: 1999–2000

Manchester United

- Premier League: 2000–01

Cambridge United

- Conference Premier play-offs: 2013–14

Individual

- Milton Keynes Dons Player of the Year: 2009–10, 2010–11
