= George Baldock =

English-Greek footballer (1993–2024)

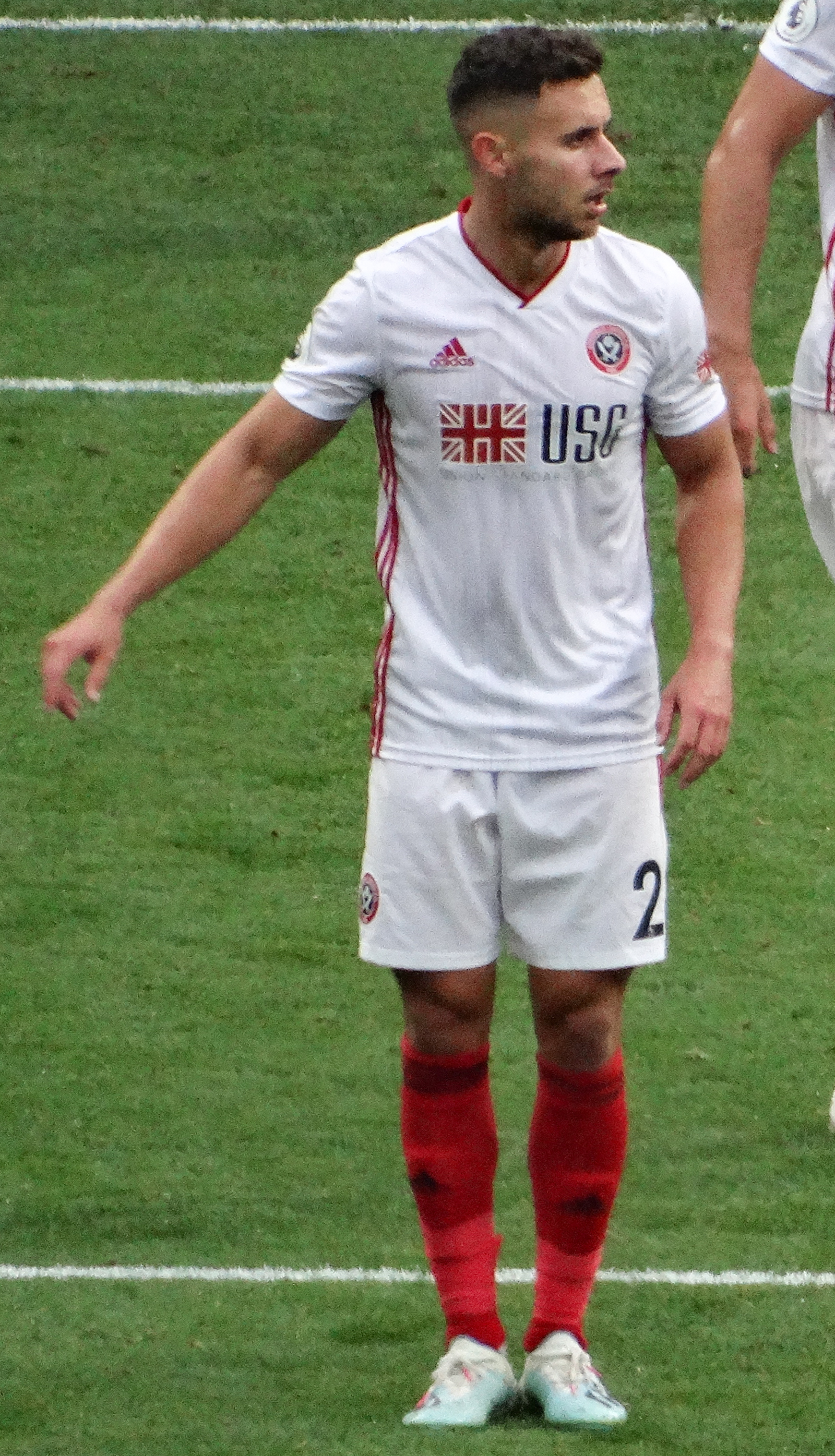
- Baldock with Sheffield United in 2019

Personal information
- Full name: George Henry Ivor Baldock
- Date of birth: 9 March 1993
- Place of birth: Buckingham, England
- Date of death: 9 October 2024 (aged 31)
- Place of death: Glyfada, Greece
- Height: 1.78 m (5 ft 10 in)
- Position: Right-back

Youth career
- –2009: Milton Keynes Dons

Senior career*
Years	Team	Apps	(Gls)
2009–2017	Milton Keynes Dons	104	(2)
2011	→ Northampton Town (loan)	5	(0)
2012	→ Tamworth (loan)	3	(0)
2012	→ ÍBV (loan)	16	(1)
2012	→ Tamworth (loan)	15	(1)
2015–2016	→ Oxford United (loan)	39	(3)
2017–2024	Sheffield United	205	(6)
2024	Panathinaikos	3	(0)
Total		390	(13)

International career
2022–2024	Greece	12	(0)
- * Club domestic league appearances and goals

George Henry Ivor Baldock (Greek: Τζορτζ Χένρι Άιβορ Μπάλντοκ; 9 March 1993 – 9 October 2024) was a professional footballer who played as a right-back or right wing-back. Born in England, he represented the Greece national team.

Baldock started his career at Milton Keynes Dons, where he played 125 total games, and was also loaned to Northampton Town, Tamworth, ÍBV and Oxford United. With the last of those clubs, he made the League Two PFA Team of the Year for 2015–16. In 2017, he signed for Sheffield United where he spent seven seasons, including three in the Premier League. After making 219 appearances for the club, he joined Panathinaikos of Super League Greece in 2024.

Born in England and with Greek ancestry through his grandmother, Baldock played for the Greece from 2022 until his death in 2024, earning 12 caps.

== Early life and family ==
Baldock was born in Buckingham, Buckinghamshire, on 9 March 1993. He had two brothers, who also worked in football: Sam, an English footballer, and James, a team doctor for Oxford United.

== Club career ==
=== Milton Keynes Dons ===
Baldock started his career playing for Milton Keynes Dons' academy team. His older brother Sam Baldock also played for the club.

Baldock made his first-team debut for Milton Keynes Dons on 1 May 2010 in the League One clash with Brighton & Hove Albion at the Stadium:mk which ended in 0–0 draw, coming on as a substitute for Daniel Powell in the 81st minute. Baldock made his full debut for the club on the last day of the 2010–11 season in a League One match against Oldham Athletic.

On 30 October 2011, he joined Northampton Town on a month's loan. In March 2012 he joined Tamworth on loan, along with teammate Charlie Collins. He made his debut in a 1–1 league draw against Gateshead and completed the full match. On 3 May 2012, he joined Icelandic Úrvalsdeild club ÍBV on a one-month loan. He made his debut for the club three days later in the opening match of the 2012 season, a 2–1 defeat away at Selfoss. Baldock was handed a one-match ban on 5 June 2012 after collecting four yellow cards in his first six games. He scored his first goal for ÍBV on 20 June 2012 in the 3–1 away win over Grindavík before being substituted for Ragnar Leósson. The following day, the club announced that Baldock's loan spell had been extended until 8 August, meaning he would be eligible to participate in the Europa League qualifying campaign.

On 3 July 2012, he was given a further one-match suspension after becoming the first player of the season in the Icelandic leagues to reach the limit of seven yellow cards in league and cup matches. Nevertheless, he made his first appearance in European competition two days later after being selected in the starting line-up for the 1–0 defeat to Irish outfit St Patrick's Athletic in the first leg of the Europa League first qualifying round.

ÍBV announced on 9 August 2012 that Baldock's loan spell with the club had been extended until the end of the month. Following his return from his loan at ÍBV, Baldock linked up on loan once again with Conference Premier club Tamworth. He signed with the club until the end of year, along with Dons teammates Charlie Collins and Jordan Ivey-Ward. George scored his first goal for Tamworth against Woking in a 3–2 victory. On 19 December 2012, Baldock scored twice for Tamworth as they beat Corby Town away 4–2 in the FA Trophy second-round replay.

Baldock featured several times for Milton Keynes Dons in the first half of the 2014–15 season, including as part of the team involved in the memorable 4–0 win over Manchester United in the second round of the League Cup on 26 August 2015. On 12 February 2015, Baldock signed a loan deal till the end of the 2014–15 season with League Two club Oxford United. He went on to play 12 games for the club, He scored a late equaliser in the 1–1 home draw with Morecambe. Baldock returned to Oxford on a season-long loan on 30 June 2015. During his loan Baldock established himself as an integral part of the team, later being named in the 2015–16 League 2 PFA Team of the Year for his performances with Oxford.

On 28 January 2016, after he impressed during his loan spell with the club, Milton Keynes Dons announced that Baldock had been recalled. On 3 May 2016, having claimed a place as a regular first-team player, Baldock was named the club's Young Player of the Year 2015/16 at the club's end-of-season awards. On 29 July 2016, Baldock signed a contract extension with Milton Keynes Dons, keeping him at the club until the summer of 2018. On 26 November 2016, Baldock made his 100th appearance for the club in a 2–1 win away versus Coventry City.

=== Sheffield United ===
On 13 June 2017, Baldock was reunited with former Oxford manager Chris Wilder when he joined newly promoted Championship club Sheffield United, on a three-year deal for an undisclosed fee. He scored his first goal for the club on 26 December in a 3–0 win over Sunderland at Bramall Lane.

On 28 April 2019, Baldock saw the Blades secure promotion to the Premier League following a 12-year absence. He made his top-flight debut on 10 August in a 1–1 draw at A.F.C. Bournemouth, and was praised by Tom Prentki of The Daily Telegraph as a "crucial cog" who provided the cross for his team's goal. He signed a new three-year contract at the club on 19 August. On 9 November, he scored his first Premier League goal, equalising in a 1–1 draw away to Tottenham Hotspur from a crossed ball. Sheffield United finished the season in 9th place despite being tipped for relegation at the start of the campaign, and Baldock and left-back Enda Stevens were described as "superb" by The Independent.

Baldock signed a new four-year deal on 12 December 2020, keeping him at the club until 2024. Sheffield United were back in the Premier League for 2023–24, but Baldock was affected by injuries, and the team were relegated. In May 2024, it was announced that he would leave once his contract expired at the end of the 2023–24 season.

Baldock was known as "Starman" to Sheffield United fans, who chanted the David Bowie song while adding his name. He bought a defibrilator for a young fan with a heart condition, so that the boy could play football.

=== Panathinaikos ===
On 29 May 2024, Baldock joined Greek side Panathinaikos by signing a three-year contract. He made his debut on 8 August in the UEFA Europa League third qualifying round, first leg, at home to Ajax, coming on as a 63rd-minute substitute for Giannis Kotsiras. He played three Super League Greece games, the last being a goalless draw at home to Olympiacos in the Derby of the Eternal Enemies on 6 October.

== International career ==
Baldock was of Greek descent through his grandmother, and was thus eligible to represent Greece at an international level as well as England. Having obtained Greek nationality, on 27 May 2022 he was called up to the Greek national team by head coach Gus Poyet for the first time ahead of their 2022–23 UEFA Nations League June fixtures.

On 2 June 2022, Baldock made his debut for Greece in a 1–0 win over Northern Ireland at Windsor Park in Belfast.

== Death ==
Baldock was found dead in the pool of his house in Glyfada, Athens, on 9 October 2024. He had been due to return to England to celebrate his son's first birthday. After several hours of being unable to reach him, his fiancée in England raised concern, prompting the property owner to discover his body. He was 31 years old.

On 23 July 2025, an inquest at Milton Keynes coroner's court ruled Baldock's cause of death as "accidental drowning". No drugs were found in his system at the time of his death. The post-mortem examination also revealed that Baldock's heart was enlarged and would have been susceptible to arrhythmias.

=== Tributes ===
The day after Baldock's death, Greece played against England (the country of Baldock's birth) in the UEFA Nations League at Wembley Stadium. The Greek players had learned of his death the night before the game, and were reported to have barely slept. The Hellenic Football Federation requested that UEFA postpone the game, but were told that there was no available future date. Greece won the game 2–1, their first ever victory over England, with goalscorer Vangelis Pavlidis lifting a Baldock shirt alongside his teammates to celebrate both the first goal and the full-time whistle, and dedicating the victory to him.

On 24 October 2024, Panathinaikos played English club Chelsea in their first home match since the death of Baldock. They remembered him with a live performance of "Starman" by a local band, and displays of his squad number 32. An employee of the visiting club handed over a Milton Keynes Dons shirt with Baldock's name to be displayed in his locker at the training ground.

On 15 July 2025, the players of the Greek national team donated part of their bonus for the team's promotion to the League A of UEFA Nations League to Baldock's family.

=== Legacy ===
Following his death, Baldock's family created The George Baldock Foundation in his memory, providing opportunities for disadvantaged children through sport. In 2026, two of his former clubs, Sheffield United and Milton Keynes Dons provided free football training camps to disadvantaged children in their areas, funded by and in partnership with Baldock's foundation.

== Career statistics ==
=== Club ===
Appearances and goals by club, season and competition
Club	Season	League			National cup (Note: Includes FA Cup, Icelandic Cup)		League cup (Note: Includes Football League/EFL Cup)		Other		Total	
Club	Season	Division	Apps	Goals	Apps	Goals	Apps	Goals	Apps	Goals	Apps	Goals
Milton Keynes Dons	2009–10	League One	1	0	0	0	0	0	0	0	1	0
Milton Keynes Dons	2010–11	League One	2	0	0	0	0	0	0	0	2	0
Milton Keynes Dons	2011–12	League One	0	0	1	0	1	0	1 (Note: Appearance(s) in Football League Trophy)	0	3	0
Milton Keynes Dons	2012–13	League One	2	0	0	0	0	0	0	0	2	0
Milton Keynes Dons	2013–14	League One	38	2	4	0	2	0	2	0	46	2
Milton Keynes Dons	2014–15	League One	9	0	2	0	3	0	0	0	14	0
Milton Keynes Dons	2015–16	Championship	15	0	0	0	0	0	—		15	0
Milton Keynes Dons	2016–17	League One	37	0	3	0	0	0	2 (Note: Appearances in EFL Trophy)	0	42	0
Milton Keynes Dons	Total		104	2	10	0	6	0	5	0	125	2
Northampton Town (loan)	2011–12	League Two	5	0	0	0	0	0	0	0	5	0
Tamworth (loan)	2011–12	Conference Premier	3	0	0	0	—		—		3	0
ÍBV (loan)	2012	Úrvalsdeild	16	1	1	0	—		2 (Note: Appearance(s) in UEFA Europa League)	0	19	1
Tamworth (loan)	2012–13	Conference Premier	15	1	1	0	—		3 (Note: Appearances in FA Trophy)	2	19	3
Oxford United (loan)	2014–15	League Two	12	1	0	0	0	0	0	0	12	1
Oxford United (loan)	2015–16	League Two	27	2	5	0	1	0	2	0	35	2
Oxford United (loan)	Total		39	3	5	0	1	0	2	0	47	3
Sheffield United	2017–18	Championship	34	1	3	0	1	0	—		38	1
Sheffield United	2018–19	Championship	27	1	0	0	0	0	—		27	1
Sheffield United	2019–20	Premier League	38	2	2	0	0	0	—		40	2
Sheffield United	2020–21	Premier League	32	0	2	0	0	0	—		34	0
Sheffield United	2021–22	Championship	25	1	0	0	0	0	2 (Note: Appearances in Championship play-offs)	0	27	1
Sheffield United	2022–23	Championship	36	1	4	0	0	0	—		40	1
Sheffield United	2023–24	Premier League	13	0	0	0	0	0	—		13	0
Sheffield United	Total		205	6	11	0	1	0	2	0	219	6
Panathinaikos	2024–25	Super League Greece	3	0	0	0	—		1	0	4	0
Career total			390	13	28	0	8	0	15	2	441	15

=== International ===
Appearances and goals by national team and year
National team	Year	Apps	Goals
Greece	2022	6	0
Greece	2023	4	0
Greece	2024	2	0
Total		12	0

== Honours ==
Sheffield United

- EFL Championship second-place promotion: 2018–19, 2022–23

Individual

- Milton Keynes Dons Academy Player of the Year: 2010–11
- Milton Keynes Dons Young Player of the Year: 2015–16
- PFA Team of the Year: 2015–16 League Two
