= 2011–12 Milton Keynes Dons F.C. season =

Milton Keynes Dons
2011–12 season
- Chairman: Pete Winkelman
- Manager: Karl Robinson
- Stadium: Stadium mk
- League One: 5th (qualified for play-offs)
- FA Cup: Third round
- League Cup: Third round
- League Trophy: First round
- Top goalscorer: League: Dean Bowditch (12); All: Dean Bowditch (15)
- Highest home attendance: 19,506 (vs Queens Park Rangers); 7 January 2012, FA Cup R3
- Lowest home attendance: 4,110 (vs Nantwich Town); 12 November 2011, FA Cup R1
- Average home league attendance: 8,659
- Biggest win: 6–0 (vs Nantwich Town); 12 November 2011, FA Cup R1
- Biggest defeat: 4–2 (vs Stevenage); 24 January 2012, League One
Home colours	Away colours	Third colours

The 2011–12 season was Milton Keynes Dons' eighth season in their existence as a professional association football club, and their fourth consecutive season competing in Football League One.

As well as competing in League One, the club also participated in the FA Cup, League Cup and League Trophy.

The season covers the period from 1 July 2011 to 30 June 2012.

== Competitions ==
=== League One ===
Final table

Pos	Team	Pld	W	D	L	GF	GA	GD	Pts
3	Sheffield United	46	27	9	10	92	51	+41	90
4	Huddersfield Town (P)	46	21	18	7	79	47	+32	81
5	Milton Keynes Dons	46	22	14	10	84	47	+37	80
6	Stevenage	46	18	19	9	69	44	+25	73
7	Notts County	46	21	10	15	75	63	+12	73

Source: Sky Sports

Matches

Win	Draw	Loss

Date	Opponent	Venue	Result	Scorers	Attendance	Ref
6 August 2011 – 15:00	Hartlepool United	Home	2–2	Chadwick, Ibehre	7,287	
13 August 2011 – 15:00	Exeter City	Away	2–0	Ibehre, Bowditch	4,832	
16 August 2011 – 19:45	Yeovil Town	Away	1–0	S. Baldock	3,274	
20 August 2011 – 15:00	Chesterfield	Home	6–2	S. Baldock (3), Bowditch, Chadwick, O'Shea	7,011	
27 August 2011 – 15:00	Stevenage	Home	1–0	MacDonald	8,128	
3 September 2011 – 15:00	Carlisle United	Away	3–1	MacDonald, Bowditch, Lewington	4,919	
10 September 2011 – 15:00	Sheffield Wednesday	Away	1–3	Balanta	16,982	
17 September 2011 – 15:00	Huddersfield Town	Home	1–1	Lewington	8,243	
24 September 2011 – 15:00	Bury	Away	0–0		2,378	
27 September 2011 – 19:45	Charlton Athletic	Home	1–1	Williams	8,114	
1 October 2011 – 15:00	Notts County	Home	3–0	Balanta, Morrison, Powell	7,620	
10 October 2011 – 19:45	Oldham Athletic	Away	1–2	Morrison	2,408	
15 October 2011 – 15:00	Bournemouth	Home	2–2	Balanta, Morrison	8,927	
22 October 2011 – 15:00	Scunthorpe United	Home	0–0		10,554	
25 October 2011 – 19:45	Sheffield United	Away	1–2	Gleeson	16,367	
29 October 2011 – 15:00	Walsall	Away	2–0	Lewington, Ibehre	3,712	
5 November 2011 – 15:00	Rochdale	Home	3–1	Smith, MacDonald, Beevers	7,120	
19 November 2011 – 15:00	Colchester United	Away	5–1	MacDonald (2), Flanagan, Gleeson, Ibehre	4,247	
26 November 2011 – 15:00	Wycombe Wanderers	Home	4–3	Bowditch (2), Ibehre, Kouo-Doumbé	9,701	
10 December 2011 – 15:00	Tranmere Rovers	Away	2–0	Ibehre, Williams	4,314	
17 December 2011 – 15:00	Preston North End	Home	0–1		8,009	
26 December 2011 – 13:00	Leyton Orient	Away	3–0	Bowditch, Smith, MacDonald	4,162	
31 December 2011 – 15:00	Brentford	Away	3–3	Potter, Balanta, MacDonald	5,397	
2 January 2012 – 15:00	Colchester United	Home	1–0	MacKenzie	7,892	
21 January 2012 – 15:00	Notts County	Away	1–1	Flanagan	6,123	
24 January 2012 – 19:45	Stevenage	Away	2–4	O'Shea, Flanagan	3,345	
31 January 2012 – 19:45	Sheffield Wednesday	Home	1–1	Bywater (o.g.)	9,776	
4 February 2012 – 15:00	Huddersfield Town	Away	1–1	Gleeson	16,898	
14 February 2012 – 19:45	Charlton Athletic	Away	1–2	Bowditch	15,569	
18 February 2012 – 15:00	Oldham Athletic	Home	5–0	Bowditch, Powell (2), Kouo-Doumbé, Gleeson	7,817	
21 February 2012 – 19:45	Bury	Home	2–1	Bowditch (2)	6,405	
25 February 2012 – 15:00	Bournemouth	Away	1–0	Kouo-Doumbé	6,419	
3 March 2012 – 15:00	Hartlepool United	Away	1–1	O'Shea	4,955	
6 March 2012 – 19:45	Yeovil Town	Home	0–1		6,624	
10 March 2012 – 15:00	Exeter City	Home	3–0	Kouo-Doumbé, MacDonald, Ibehre	9,016	
17 March 2012 – 15:00	Chesterfield	Away	1–1	O'Shea	6,444	
20 March 2012 – 19:45	Leyton Orient	Home	4–1	MacDonald, Williams, Ibehre, Powell	6,842	
24 March 2012 – 15:00	Wycombe Wanderers	Away	1–1	Powell	5,572	
27 March 2012 – 19:45	Carlisle United	Home	1–2	Powell	8,608	
31 March 2012 – 15:00	Brentford	Home	1–2	Williams	11,570	
7 April 2012 – 15:00	Preston North End	Away	1–1	Potter	13,941	
9 April 2012 – 15:00	Tranmere Rovers	Home	3–0	Williams (2), Gleeson	7,355	
14 April 2012 – 15:00	Scunthorpe United	Away	3–0	Bowditch, Powell, Williams	4,111	
21 April 2012 – 15:00	Sheffield United	Home	1–0	Smith	15,938	
28 April 2012 – 15:00	Rochdale	Away	2–1	O'Shea, Bowditch	2,213	
5 May 2012 – 15:00	Walsall	Home	0–1		10,607	

Play-offs

Date	Opponent	Venue	Result	Scorers	Attendance	Ref
12 May 2012 – 12:30	Huddersfield Town	Home	0–2		11,893	
15 May 2012 – 19:45	Huddersfield Town	Away	2–1 (Note: Aggregate score 3-2 to Huddersfield Town.)	Powell, Smith	15,085	

=== FA Cup ===
Matches

Win	Draw	Loss

Date	Round	Opponent	Venue	Result	Scorers	Attendance	Ref
12 November 2011 – 15:00	First round	Nantwich Town	Home	6–0	Kouo-Doumbé, Bowditch (2), Powell; O'Shea, G.C. Williams	4,110	
3 December 2011 – 15:00	Second round	Barnet	Away	3–1	Potter, MacDonald, Powell	2,608	
7 January 2012 – 15:00	Third round	Queens Park Rangers	Home	1–1	Bowditch	19,506	
17 January 2012 – 20:00	Third round (replay)	Queens Park Rangers	Away	0–1		10,855	

=== League Cup ===
Matches

Win	Draw	Loss

Date	Round	Opponent	Venue	Result	Scorers	Attendance	Ref
9 August 2011 – 19:45	First round	Cheltenham Town	Away	4–1	S. Baldock, Ibehre, Powell, Balanta	1,625	
23 August 2011 – 19:45	Second round	Norwich City	Away	4–0	Chawick (2), S. Baldock, Powell	13,009	
20 September 2011 – 19:45	Third round	Burnley	Away	1–2	Powell	4,134	

=== League Trophy ===
Matches

Win	Draw	Loss

Date	Round	Opponent	Venue	Result	Scorers	Attendance	Ref
30 August 2011 – 19:45	First round	Brentford	Home	3–3 (Note: Score 3–3 at the conclusion of normal time. Brentford won 3–4 on penalties.)	MacDonald, Chadwick, Douglas (o.g.)	4,175	

== Player details ==
List of squad players, including number of appearances by competition.
Players with squad numbers struck through and marked † left the club during the playing season.

No.	Pos	Nat	Player	Total		League One		FA Cup		League Cup		Other (Note: Includes Football League Trophy and 2011–12 Football League One play-offs.)	
No.	Pos	Nat	Player	Apps	Goals	Apps	Goals	Apps	Goals	Apps	Goals	Apps	Goals
1	GK	(England) ENG	David Martin	56	0	46	0	4	0	3	0	3	0
~~2~~ †	DF	(England) ENG	Adam Smith	19	2	17	2	0	0	1	0	1	0
~~2~~ †	DF	(England) ENG	James Tavernier	7	0	7	0	0	0	0	0	0	0
3	DF	(England) ENG	Dean Lewington	55	4	46	3	3	0	3	1	3	0
4	DF	(France) FRA	Mathias Kouo-Doumbé	23	5	20	4	3	1	0	0	0	0
5	DF	(Scotland) SCO	Gary MacKenzie	32	1	26	1	2	0	2	0	2	0
~~6~~ †	DF	(England) ENG	Mark Beevers	14	1	14	1	0	0	0	0	0	0
7	MF	(Republic of Ireland) IRL	Stephen Gleeson	46	5	39	5	2	0	2	0	3	0
8	MF	(Republic of Ireland) IRL	Darren Potter	49	3	40	2	3	1	3	0	3	0
9	FW	(England) ENG	Dean Bowditch	51	15	41	12	4	3	3	0	3	0
10	FW	(England) ENG	Charlie MacDonald	41	11	35	9	3	1	0	0	3	1
~~11~~ †	FW	(Colombia) COL	Ángelo Balanta	23	4	19	3	2	0	2	1	0	0
11	MF	(England) ENG	Alan Smith	18	2	16	1	0	0	0	0	2	1
12	DF	(England) ENG	Adam Chicksen	27	0	20	0	2	0	2	0	3	0
13	DF	(Republic of Ireland) IRL	Shaun Williams	49	9	39	8	4	1	3	0	3	0
~~14~~ †	FW	(England) ENG	Lewis Guy	1	0	1	0	0	0	0	0	0	0
14	MF	(Scotland) SCO	Paul Slane	5	0	5	0	0	0	0	0	0	0
15	DF	(Northern Ireland) NIR	Tom Flanagan	25	3	21	3	2	0	1	0	1	0
16	GK	(Republic of Ireland) IRL	Ian McLoughlin	2	0	1	0	1	0	0	0	0	0
17	FW	(England) ENG	Daniel Powell	53	11	43	6	4	2	3	2	3	1
18	MF	(England) ENG	George Baldock	3	0	0	0	1	0	1	0	1	0
19	FW	(England) ENG	Jabo Ibehre	47	9	39	8	3	0	3	1	2	0
20	FW	(England) ENG	Charlie Collins	1	0	0	0	0	0	1	0	0	0
23	MF	(Republic of Ireland) IRL	Jay O'Shea	35	6	28	5	2	1	2	0	3	0
26	MF	(England) ENG	Luke Chadwick	50	5	42	2	3	0	3	2	2	1
~~27~~ †	MF	(England) ENG	Anthony McNamee	8	0	7	0	0	0	1	0	0	0
~~29~~ †	FW	(Republic of Ireland) IRL	Clinton Morrison	6	3	6	3	0	0	0	0	0	0
35	FW	(Wales) WAL	George C Williams	3	1	2	0	1	1	0	0	0	0
37	DF	(England) ENG	Brendan Galloway	2	0	1	0	1	0	0	0	0	0
46	FW	(England) ENG	Rob Hall	2	0	2	0	0	0	0	0	0	0

== Transfers ==
=== Transfers in ===
Date from	Position	Name	From	Fee	Ref.
1 July 2011	MF	(Republic of Ireland) Darren Potter	Sheffield Wednesday	Free transfer	
22 July 2011	GK	(Republic of Ireland) Ian McLoughlin	Free agent (Note: Previous club: Ipswich Town.)	Free transfer	
22 July 2011	MF	(England) Jay O'Shea	Free agent (Note: Previous club: Birmingham City.)	Free transfer	
26 August 2011	FW	(England) Charlie MacDonald	Brentford	Undisclosed	
31 August 2011	MF	(England) Anthony McNamee	Norwich City	Free transfer (Note: Mutual contract termination with Norwich City.)	

=== Transfers out ===
Date from	Position	Name	To	Fee	Ref.
26 August 2011	FW	(England) Sam Baldock	West Ham United	Undisclosed (Note: Rumoured transfer fee £2,750,000.)	
31 January 2012	MF	(England) Anthony McNamee	Wycombe Wanderers	Free transfer (Note: Mutual contract termination.)	

=== Loans in ===
Start date	Position	Name	From	End date	Ref.
1 August 2011	FW	(Colombia) Ángelo Balanta	Queens Park Rangers	January 2012	
16 August 2011	DF	(England) Adam Smith	Tottenham Hotspur	January 2012 (Note: Recalled. Originally until end of season.)	
31 August 2011	DF	(England) Mark Beevers	Sheffield Wednesday	31 December 2011	
24 September 2011	FW	(Republic of Ireland) Clinton Morrison	Sheffield Wednesday	24 October 2011	
29 January 2012	MF	(England) Alan Smith	Newcastle United	End of season	
31 January 2012	MF	(Scotland) Paul Slane	(Scotland) Celtic	End of season	
16 March 2012	FW	(England) Rob Hall	West Ham United	End of season	

=== Loans out ===
Start date	Position	Name	To	End date	Ref.
9 August 2011	FW	(England) Lewis Guy	Oxford United	10 September 2011	
24 November 2011	FW	(England) Lewis Guy	Oxford United	24 December 2011	
24 November 2011	MF	(England) Anthony McNamee	Wycombe Wanderers	7 January 2012	
1 January 2012	DF	(England) Adam Chicksen	Leyton Orient	1 February 2012	
13 January 2012	FW	(England) Charlie Collins	Aldershot Town	13 February 2012	
22 March 2012	FW	(England) Charlie Collins	Tamworth	End of season	
22 March 2012	DF	(England) George Baldock	Tamworth	End of season	
