= Charlie Collins (footballer) =

English footballer

Personal information
- Full name: Charlie John Collins
- Date of birth: 22 November 1991 (age 34)
- Place of birth: Hammersmith, England
- Height: 1.83 m (6 ft 0 in)
- Position: Striker

Senior career*
| Years | Team | Apps | (Gls) |
| 2009–2012 | Milton Keynes Dons | 3 | (0) |
| 2011 | → Kettering Town (loan) | 5 | (0) |
| 2012 | → Aldershot Town (loan) | 1 | (0) |
| 2012 | → Tamworth (loan) | 6 | (0) |
| 2012 | → Tamworth (loan) | 14 | (1) |
| 2013–2018 | Metropolitan Police | 156 | (38) |
- * Club domestic league appearances and goals

Charlie John Collins (born 22 November 1991) is an English footballer who plays as a striker; he last played for Metropolitan Police. He began his career with Milton Keynes Dons.

== Career ==
Born in Hammersmith, London, Collins made his debut for Milton Keynes Dons on 1 May 2010 in the League One clash with Brighton & Hove Albion at the Stadium:mk which ended in 0–0 draw.

On 8 November 2011, Collins featured as a trialist in a match for Forest Green Rovers reserves against Crawley Town.

On 13 January 2012, it was announced that Collins would be joining Aldershot Town on a one-month loan deal.

In March 2012 he joined Tamworth on loan, along with teammate George Baldock. He made his debut in a 1–1 league draw against Gateshead and completed the full match.

He was released by the Milton Keynes Dons on 29 December 2012 after the expiration of a six-month contract extension. On 2 February 2013, he joined Metropolitan Police. The 2013–14 season saw Collins make 39 league appearances for Metropolitan Police, scoring eight goals, and he improved upon this tally the following season, scoring eleven goals in 41 appearances. He made a further 76 league appearances over the following two seasons for the club, scoring nineteen league goals, but left abrupbtly in September 2018.

== Career statistics ==
As of match played 28 April 2012.

Appearances and goals by club, season and competition
| Club | Season | League^{[A]} | | FA Cup | | League Cup | | Other^{[B]} | | Total | |
| Club | Season | Apps | Goals | Apps | Goals | Apps | Goals | Apps | Goals | Apps | Goals |
|---|---|---|---|---|---|---|---|---|---|---|---|
| Milton Keynes Dons | 2009–10 | 2 | 0 | 0 | 0 | 0 | 0 | 0 | 0 | 2 | 0 |
| Milton Keynes Dons | 2010–11 | 1 | 0 | 0 | 0 | 0 | 0 | 0 | 0 | 1 | 0 |
| Milton Keynes Dons | 2011–12 | 0 | 0 | 0 | 0 | 1 | 0 | 0 | 0 | 1 | 0 |
| Milton Keynes Dons | Total | 3 | 0 | 0 | 0 | 1 | 0 | 0 | 0 | 4 | 0 |
| Kettering Town (loan) | 2010–11 | 5 | 0 | 0 | 0 | 0 | 0 | 0 | 0 | 5 | 0 |
| Aldershot Town (loan) | 2011–12 | 1 | 0 | 0 | 0 | 0 | 0 | 0 | 0 | 1 | 0 |
| Tamworth (loan) | 2011–12 | 6 | 0 | 0 | 0 | 0 | 0 | 0 | 0 | 6 | 0 |
| Career totals | | 15 | 0 | 0 | 0 | 1 | 0 | 0 | 0 | 16 | 0 |

A. The "League" column constitutes appearances and goals in the Football League and Conference National.
B. The "Other" column constitutes appearances and goals in the Football League Trophy.
