= Tom Flanagan (footballer) =

Northern Irish footballer (born 1991)

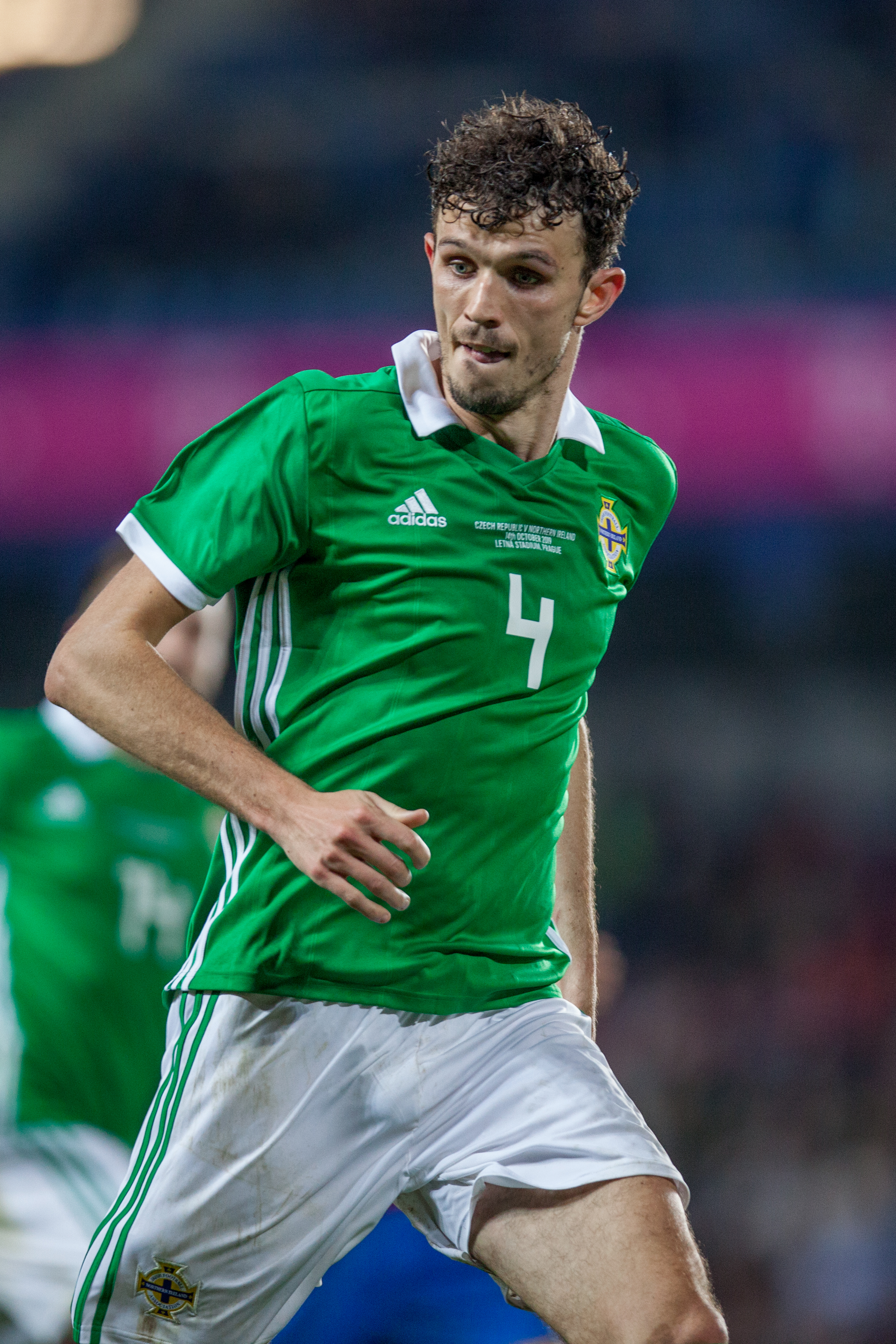
- Flanagan with Northern Ireland in 2019

Personal information
- Full name: Thomas Michael Flanagan
- Date of birth: 21 October 1991 (age 35)
- Place of birth: Hammersmith, London, England
- Height: 6 ft 4 in (1.94 m)
- Position: Defender

Youth career
- –2010: Milton Keynes Dons

Senior career*
Years	Team	Apps	(Gls)
2010–2015	Milton Keynes Dons	37	(3)
2011	→ Kettering Town (loan)	8	(1)
2012–2013	→ Gillingham (loan)	13	(1)
2013	→ Barnet (loan)	9	(0)
2014	→ Stevenage (loan)	2	(0)
2015	→ Plymouth Argyle (loan)	4	(0)
2015–2018	Burton Albion	75	(2)
2018–2022	Sunderland	91	(4)
2022–2024	Shrewsbury Town	73	(2)
2024–2026	Colchester United	50	(0)

International career^{‡}
2012	Northern Ireland U21	1	(0)
2017–2026	Northern Ireland	15	(0)
- * Club domestic league appearances and goals as of 30 November 2025 (UTC) ‡ National team caps and goals as of 08:13, 16 August 2024 (UTC)

Thomas Michael Flanagan (born 21 October 1991) is a former professional footballer who played as a defender. Born in England, he played for the Northern Ireland national team.

== Club career ==
=== Milton Keynes Dons ===
Flanagan captained the Milton Keynes Dons (MK Dons) under-18 team in January 2010 while a second-year scholar. He made his first-team debut for the MK Dons as an 82nd-minute substitute in a 5–0 defeat to Carlisle United on 13 February 2010.

In August 2010, Flanagan signed his first professional contract with Milton Keynes Dons, on a 12-month deal with the option of a second year. Six months later, he joined Kettering Town, where he made his first professional start while out on loan at Kettering Town during the 2010–11 season. Soon after, his loan was extended until 3 March on 1 February. A number of top performances earned him a recall and was put straight into the line up for a midweek defeat at home, to Leyton Orient where he made his league debut of the season in a 3–2 loss on 15 February 2011. Later in the season, Flanagan also started the final game of the season against Oldham Athletic which ended up in a 2–1 away win. In 2011, he signed a new contract with the Dons; a one-year deal with the option of an additional 12 months.

The following season, Flanagan was on the bench at the beginning of the season until playing his first match of the season against Charlton Athletic on 27 September 2011. Two months later on 19 November 2011, Flanagan scored his first goal for the club in a 5–1 win over Colchester United. Later on the season, Flanagan scored two more goals against Stevenage and Notts County. Flanagan earned a regular place in the starting eleven although being on the substitute bench. Flanagan made 21 appearances and scored three.

On 24 March 2014, Flanagan signed a new one-year contract with the Dons.

==== Gillingham (loan) ====
On 30 July 2012, Flanagan signed a six-month loan deal with Gillingham of League Two, After two appearances at Gillingham so far, Flanagan express delight of joining Gillingham and that the club went to have a good start Three months at Gillingham, he scored his first goal in a 4–1 win over Burton Albion After the match, Flanagan says increasing playing time helping his form at Gillingham. His loan spell at Gillingham ended when he suffered a foot injury.

While at Gillingham, he was called up for the Northern Ireland U21 squad.

==== Barnet (loan) ====
On 14 March 2013, Flanagan joined another League Two side, Barnet, on loan until the end of the 2012–2013 season. He made his debut for Barnet as an 82nd-minute substitute for John Oster in a 3–2 defeat at Accrington Stanley on 16 March 2013.

==== Stevenage (loan) ====
On 26 March 2014, Flanagan joined fellow League One side Stevenage on loan until the end of the 2013–14 season. On 25 April 2014, Flanagan was recalled from his loan due to injuries and fitness concerns in the Milton Keynes Dons squad.

==== Plymouth (loan) ====
On 9 January 2015, Flanagan joined League 2 side Plymouth Argyle on loan for a month.

=== Burton Albion ===
On 25 August 2015, Flanagan joined League One side Burton Albion on a one-year deal following his release from MK Dons.

He was transfer listed by the club at the end of the 2017–18 season, following their relegation.

=== Sunderland ===
Sunderland completed the signing of Tom Flanagan on 28 June 2018, he signed a two-year deal. On 23 July 2020 he signed a contract extension until the end of the 2021–2022 season.

=== Shrewsbury Town ===
On 31 January 2022, Flanagan joined Shrewsbury Town on a two-and-a-half-year deal.

He was released by Shrewsbury at the end of the 2023–24 season.

=== Colchester United ===
On 23 July 2024, Flanagan joined League Two side Colchester United on a one-year deal. He was made captain of the club on the 9 August 2024 ahead of the 2024-25 season.

On the 11th July 2026, Flanagan announced his retirement from professional football.

== International career ==
On 7 November 2012, Flanagan was called up to the Northern Ireland U21 team for their International Challenge Match against England which was played on 13 November 2012. On 24 August 2016 Flanagan received his first call up to the senior Northern Ireland squad by manager Michael O'Neill. Flanagan made his senior debut for Northern Ireland in a friendly 1–0 win over New Zealand on 2 June 2017.

== Career statistics ==
=== Club ===
As of 6 January 2025

Appearances and goals by club, season and competition
Club	Season	League			FA Cup		League Cup		Other		Total	
Club	Season	Division	Apps	Goals	Apps	Goals	Apps	Goals	Apps	Goals	Apps	Goals
Milton Keynes Dons	2009–10	League One	1	0	0	0	0	0	0	0	1	0
Milton Keynes Dons	2010–11	League One	2	0	0	0	0	0	0	0	2	0
Milton Keynes Dons	2011–12	League One	21	3	2	0	1	0	1 (Note: Appearance(s) in Football League Trophy)	0	25	3
Milton Keynes Dons	2012–13	League One	0	0	0	0	—		—		0	0
Milton Keynes Dons	2013–14	League One	7	0	0	0	1	0	0	0	8	0
Milton Keynes Dons	2014–15	League One	6	0	2	0	1	0	0	0	9	0
Milton Keynes Dons	2015–16	Championship	0	0	—		0	0	—		0	0
Milton Keynes Dons	Total		37	3	4	0	3	0	1	0	45	3
Kettering Town (loan)	2010–11	Conference Premier	8	1	—		—		—		8	1
Gillingham (loan)	2012–13	League Two	13	1	—		1	0	1	0	15	1
Barnet (loan)	2012–13	League Two	9	0	—		—		—		9	0
Stevenage (loan)	2013–14	League One	2	0	—		—		—		2	0
Plymouth Argyle (loan)	2014–15	League Two	4	0	—		—		—		4	0
Burton Albion	2015–16	League One	18	0	1	0	—		1	0	20	0
Burton Albion	2016–17	Championship	30	0	1	0	1	0	—		32	0
Burton Albion	2017–18	Championship	27	2	1	0	2	0	—		30	2
Burton Albion	Total		111	2	3	0	4	0	2	0	120	4
Sunderland	2018–19	League One	32	2	3	0	0	0	7 (Note: Four appearances in EFL Trophy, three in League One play-offs)	0	42	2
Sunderland	2019–20	League One	18	1	0	0	3	1	1 (Note: Appearance(s) in EFL Trophy)	0	22	2
Sunderland	2020–21	League One	16	0	1	0	1	0	5 (Note: Appearances in EFL Trophy and the 2020–21 League One play-offs)	0	23	0
Sunderland	2021–22	League One	25	1	1	0	2	0	0	0	28	1
Sunderland	Total		91	4	5	0	6	1	13	0	115	5
Shrewsbury Town	2021–22	League One	14	1	0	0	0	0	0	0	14	1
Shrewsbury Town	2022–23	League One	38	1	2	0	2	0	0	0	42	1
Shrewsbury Town	2023–24	League One	21	0	1	0	1	0	2	0	25	0
Shrewsbury Town	Total		73	2	3	1	3	0	2	0	81	2
Colchester United	2024–25	League Two	41	0	1	0	0	0	3	0	45	0
Colchester United	2025–26	League Two	9	0	0	0	1	0	1	0	11	0
Colchester United	Total		50	0	1	0	1	0	4	0	56	0
Career total			362	11	16	1	17	1	22	0	417	14

== Honours ==
Gillingham

- Football League Two: 2012–13

Sunderland

- EFL Trophy: 2020–21; runner-up: 2018–19
