= Ángelo Balanta =

Colombian footballer (born 1990)

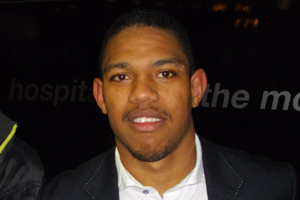
- Balanta in 2011

Personal information
- Full name: Ángelo Jasiel Balanta
- Date of birth: 1 July 1990 (age 36)
- Place of birth: Cali, Colombia
- Height: 5 ft 10 in (1.78 m)
- Positions: Attacking midfielder; striker

Team information
- Current team: Hornchurch
- Number: 10

Youth career
- CB Hounslow United
- –2007: Queens Park Rangers

Senior career*
Years	Team	Apps	(Gls)
2007–2014	Queens Park Rangers	25	(2)
2008–2009	→ Wycombe Wanderers (loan)	11	(3)
2010–2011	→ Milton Keynes Dons (loan)	18	(6)
2011–2012	→ Milton Keynes Dons (loan)	20	(4)
2012–2013	→ Milton Keynes Dons (loan)	12	(1)
2013	→ Yeovil Town (loan)	6	(0)
2014–2015	Bristol Rovers	16	(1)
2015–2016	Carlisle United	7	(1)
2016–2018	Boreham Wood	85	(19)
2018–2023	Dagenham & Redbridge	118	(35)
2023–2024	Boreham Wood	39	(6)
2024–	Hornchurch	70	(28)
- * Club domestic league appearances and goals as of 18:31, 20 May 2026 (UTC)

Ángelo Jasiel Balanta (born 1 July 1990) is a Colombian professional footballer who plays as an attacking midfielder or a striker for National League club Hornchurch.

== Club career ==
Born in Cali, Colombia, Balanta moved to England when he was 5 and grew up in Fulham as a youth where he attended Hurlingham & Chelsea Secondary school. he then attended south thames college for a year, completing a construction course. Balanta progressed through the Queens Park Rangers youth system before being promoted to the first team in 2007. He had been spotted by QPR scouts playing for CB Hounslow United who play in the Combined Counties League. He signed his first professional contract with QPR in January 2008, which will keep him at the club until 2010 and was given shirt number 36.

He made his first team debut when he was brought on as a substitute, replacing Ben Sahar, against Crystal Palace on 4 December 2007. He made his first start against Watford on 29 December 2007. In the 10th minute of the game, Balanta put Dexter Blackstock through with a looping ball which resulted in him being fouled and a penalty kick being given, which was scored by Martin Rowlands. In the 40th minute, Balanta won an aerial challenge against Lloyd Doyley and found unmarked Martin Rowlands with a lob. Rowlands scored with a chip over Richard Lee from an acute angle. Balanta is highly rated at QPR and is the latest talent to break through the youth set up at Loftus Road. On 5 January 2008, he made his FA Cup debut against Chelsea, coming on as a 65th-minute substitute for new signing Hogan Ephraim. On 23 February 2008, Balanta scored his first senior goal for QPR against Sheffield United at Loftus Road. The goal came in the 19th minute when Hogan Ephraim whipped in a cross into the near post where Balanta latched onto the ball. Rangers drew the game 1–1.

At the start of the 2008–09 season, new manager Iain Dowie handed Balanta the number 19 shirt and gave him his first start in a League Cup third round game away at Swindon Town, which was won 3–2, with Balanta scoring the first goal. On 13 November 2008, Balanta moved on loan to League Two side Wycombe Wanderers for three months. He was recalled from his loan spell two weeks early having scored three goals in 11 games.

In June 2010, Balanta moved on loan to Milton Keynes Dons for the entire 2010–11 season. On 1 August 2011 Balanta returned to MK Dons for a five-month loan.

In January 2012, Balanta returned to Queens Park Rangers and was given the number 46 shirt. In their game against Aston Villa he was placed on the bench.

On 26 March 2013, Balanta joined League One side Yeovil Town on loan until the end of the 2012–13 season. Balanta made seven appearances for Yeovil and was an unused substitute in the 2013 League One play-off final as Yeovil beat Brentford 2–1 to secure promotion to the Football League Championship. On 1 July 2014, Balanta was released by QPR after seven years at the club, and joined Bristol Rovers. Balanta had a successful year at Rovers in the Football Conference, scoring a penalty in the club's penalty shootout victory over Grimsby Town in the play-off final. However, he decided to join Carlisle in June 2015.

On 28 July 2016, Balanta joined National League side Boreham Wood on a one-year deal.

On 22 October 2018, he signed for fellow National League outfit Dagenham & Redbridge mere days after playing against them in the FA Cup, a game in which Boreham Wood chairman Danny Hunter stated 'his mind was understandably elsewhere'. In the same statement, Hunter also revealed that Dagenham had initially seen two bids rejected before finally reaching agreement on a 'substantial deal' of undisclosed value.

After just short of five years at Dagenham, with the latter two being limited by injury, he left the club by mutual consent in the summer of 2023. Former club Boreham Wood then announced his return there on 1 July, his 33rd birthday.

Following Boreham Wood's relegation at the end of the 2023–24 season, Balanta was in talks regarding a new contract, instead opting to join newly promoted National League South side Hornchurch.

Balanta was named National League South Player of the Season for the 2025–26 season, having helped Hornchurch defeat Torquay United in the play-off final to earn promotion to the National League for the first time in the club's history.

== International career ==
In September 2008, the England Under-19 side placed Balanta on standby as a replacement were a player to withdraw from the team.

== Career statistics ==
As of end of 2025–26 season

Appearances and goals by club, season and competition
Club	Season	League			FA Cup		League Cup		Other		Total	
Club	Season	Division	Apps	Goals	Apps	Goals	Apps	Goals	Apps	Goals	Apps	Goals
Queens Park Rangers	2007–08	Championship	11	1	1	0	0	0	—		12	1
Queens Park Rangers	2008–09	Championship	10	1	0	0	3	1	—		13	2
Queens Park Rangers	2009–10	Championship	4	0	0	0	0	0	—		4	0
Queens Park Rangers	2010–11	Championship	0	0	—		—		—		0	0
Queens Park Rangers	2011–12	Premier League	0	0	—		—		—		0	0
Queens Park Rangers	2012–13	Premier League	0	0	—		0	0	—		0	0
Queens Park Rangers	2013–14	Championship	0	0	0	0	0	0	0	0	0	0
Queens Park Rangers	Total		25	2	1	0	3	1	0	0	29	3
Wycombe Wanderers (loan)	2008–09	League Two	11	3	—		—		—		11	3
Milton Keynes Dons (loan)	2010–11	League One	18	6	1	0	3	0	3 (Note: One appearance in Football League Trophy, two appearances and one goal in League One play-offs)	1	25	7
Milton Keynes Dons (loan)	2011–12	League One	20	4	2	0	2	1	—		24	5
Milton Keynes Dons (loan)	2012–13	League One	12	1	1	0	—		—		13	1
Milton Keynes Dons (loan)	Total		50	11	4	0	5	1	3	1	62	13
Yeovil Town (loan)	2012–13	League One	6	0	—		—		1 (Note: Appearance in League One Play-offs)	0	7	0
Bristol Rovers	2014–15	Conference Premier	16	1	0	0	—		3 (Note: One appearance in FA Trophy, two in Conference Premier Play-offs)	0	19	1
Carlisle United	2015–16	League Two	7	1	0	0	2	0	1 (Note: Appearance in Football League Trophy)	0	10	1
Boreham Wood	2016–17	National League	42	6	3	2	—		5 (Note: Appearances in FA Trophy)	2	50	10
Boreham Wood	2017–18	National League	32	10	3	0	—		7 (Note: Three appearances and one goal in National League play-offs, four in FA Trophy)	1	42	11
Boreham Wood	2018–19	National League	11	3	1	0	—		—		12	3
Boreham Wood	Total		85	19	7	2	—		12	3	104	24
Dagenham & Redbridge	2018–19	National League	23	6	—		—		2	1	25	7
Dagenham & Redbridge	2019–20	National League	22	8	1	0	—		0	0	23	8
Dagenham & Redbridge	2020–21	National League	34	11	3	0	—		2	1	39	12
Dagenham & Redbridge	2021–22	National League	22	8	2	2	—		2	0	26	10
Dagenham & Redbridge	2022–23	National League	17	2	0	0	—		0	0	17	2
Dagenham & Redbridge	Total		118	35	6	2	—		6	2	130	39
Boreham Wood	2023–24	National League	39	6	1	0	—		1	0	41	6
Hornchurch	2024–25	National League South	33	7	3	1	—		1	0	37	8
Hornchurch	2025–26	National League South	37	21	1	0	—		5 (Note: Three appearances and one goal in FA Trophy, two appearances in National League South play-offs)	1	43	22
Hornchurch	Total		70	28	4	1	0	0	6	1	80	30
Career total			427	106	23	5	10	2	32	6	493	120

== Honours ==
Yeovil Town

- Football League One play-offs: 2013

Bristol Rovers

- Conference Premier play-offs: 2015

Hornchurch

- National League South play-offs: 2026

Individual

- National League Player of the Month: March 2021
- National League South Team of the Season: 2025–26
- National League South Player of the Season: 2025–26
