= Karl Robinson =

English football manager (born 1980)

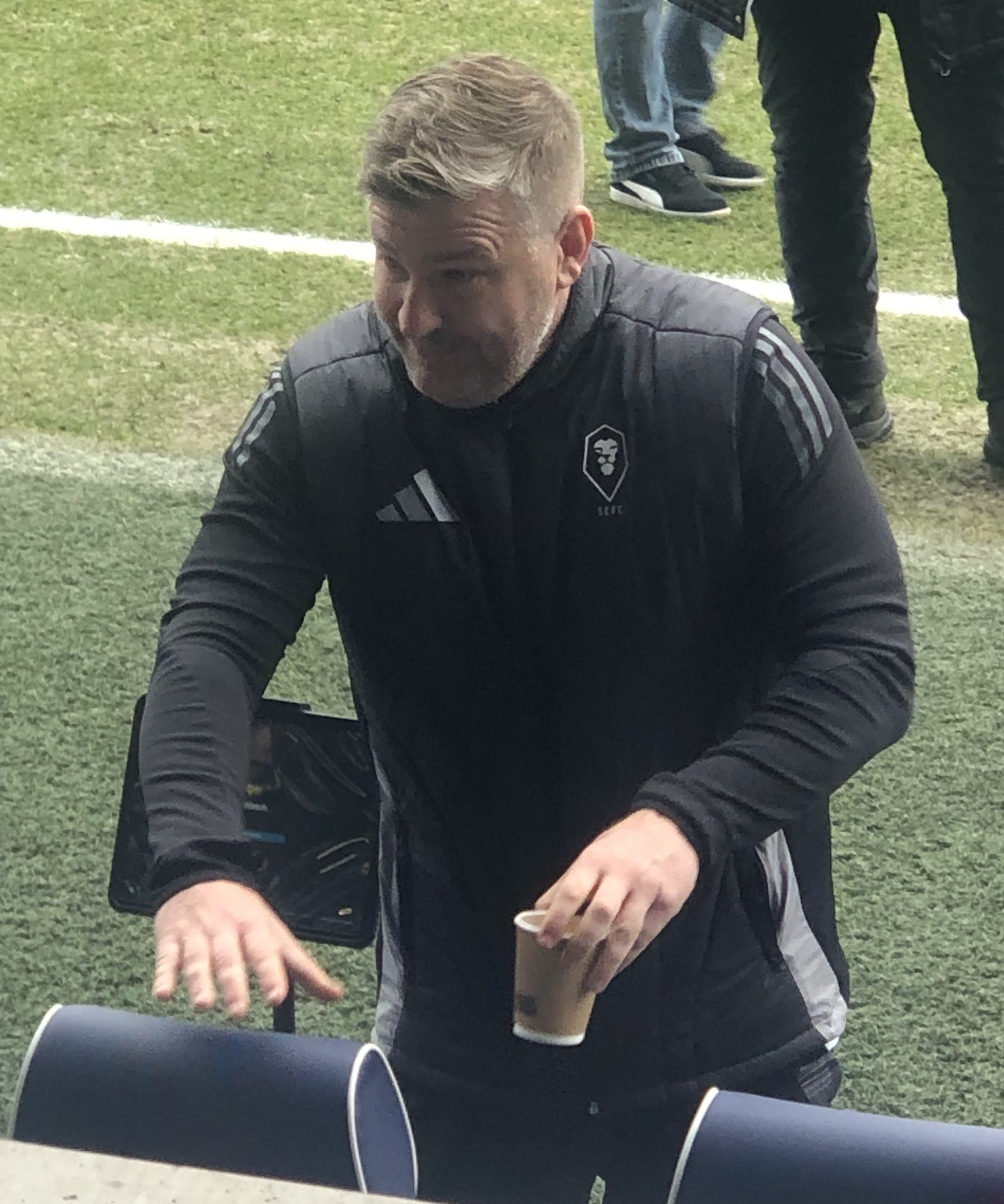
- Robinson in 2025

Personal information
- Full name: Karl Joseph Robinson
- Date of birth: 13 September 1980 (age 46)
- Place of birth: Liverpool, Merseyside, England
- Positions: Striker; midfielder

Team information
- Current team: Bromley (manager)

Youth career
- Everton
- Blackpool

Senior career*
Years	Team	Apps	(Gls)
1999–2000	Caernarfon Town	13	(0)
2000–2001	Marine		
2001	Bamber Bridge		
2001–2002	Marine		
2002	Oswestry Town	5	(0)
2002	Rhyl	4	(0)
2002–2003	Oswestry Town	26	(5)
2003	Kidsgrove Athletic		
2003–2005	Prescot Cables		
2005–2006	St Helens Town		
2006	Alsager Town		
2006–2007	Warrington Town		
Total		48	(5)

Managerial career
- 2010–2016: Milton Keynes Dons
- 2016–2018: Charlton Athletic
- 2018–2023: Oxford United
- 2024–2026: Salford City
- 2026–: Bromley
- * Club domestic league appearances and goals

Karl Joseph Robinson (born 13 September 1980) is an English professional football manager and former player. He is currently the head coach of EFL League One side Bromley.

Robinson began his managerial career aged 29, spending six years with Milton Keynes Dons and guiding them to the Championship in 2015. Robinson was sacked the following year, and was appointed manager of Charlton Athletic soon after. After spending 18 months at the club, he departed for Oxford United, where he spent five years and guided the club to two play-off campaigns before eventually being sacked.

== Playing career ==
Robinson was born in Liverpool, Merseyside. He played mostly non-league football, for Bamber Bridge, Marine, Oswestry Town, Kidsgrove Athletic, Prescot Cables, St Helens Town, Alsager Town and Warrington Town, though also played in the League of Wales for Caernarfon Town and Rhyl.

== Style of play ==
Robinson played as a striker, being described as a "big, powerful centre forward", and later in his career played as a midfielder.

== Coaching and management career ==
Robinson coached at the Liverpool youth academy and later worked as a coach at Blackburn Rovers.

=== Milton Keynes Dons ===
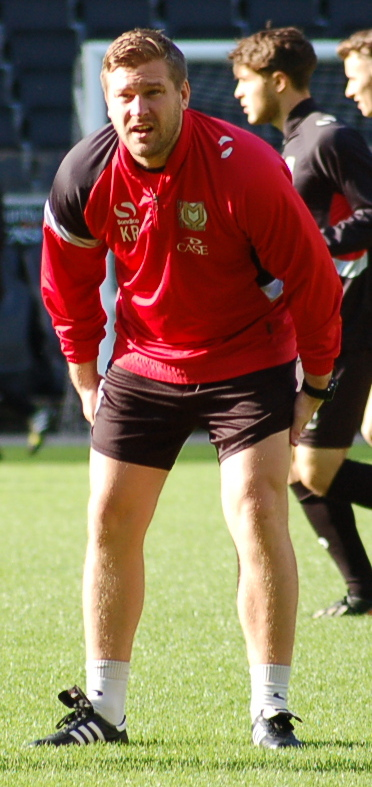
Robinson as manager of Milton Keynes Dons in 2013

He was appointed manager of League One club Milton Keynes Dons on 10 May 2010, having previously been the club's assistant manager under previous boss Paul Ince. At 29 years of age, he was the youngest manager at the time in the Football League and former England coach John Gorman was named his number two.

In the 2010–11 season, his first season in charge, Robinson guided MK Dons to 5th place in League One. This was regarded as a good achievement, improving on the Dons' points total over the previous season. The team lost in the play-offs to Peterborough United over two legs.

In the 2011–12 season, he continued making impressive strides, attracting big-name players and guiding his side to another 5th-place finish and was again in the play-offs. During the season, he signed a three-year contract extension.

In 2014–15, Robinson managed arguably MK Dons' greatest victory, a 4–0 League Cup win over Manchester United, as well as leading the Dons to promotion to the Championship when they finished as runners-up in League One.

On 20 July 2015, Robinson signed a contract extension alongside the club's Head of Coaching, Richie Barker, though MK Dons did not publicise the length of either deal. Robinson's MK Dons suffered relegation from the Championship during the 2015–16 season, finishing in 23rd position.

On 23 May 2016, it was revealed that Robinson had turned down an offer from Massimo Cellino to become Leeds United's Head Coach. In October 2016, he was relieved of his duties following a 3–0 defeat to Southend United the previous day, which took the club's winless run to four games.

=== Charlton Athletic ===
Robinson was named the new Charlton Athletic manager on 24 November 2016 following the sacking of Russell Slade, taking full charge of the club from 28 November. He departed by mutual consent in March 2018.

=== Oxford United ===
On 22 March 2018, Robinson was appointed as the new head coach of League One club Oxford United, joining on the same day as his departure from Charlton Athletic. He signed a two-and-a-half-year contract, extended to 2022 in August 2019. In his first season in charge, Oxford finished in 12th place.

In December 2019, Robinson was charged by the Football Association for using abusive language to a match official. Oxford were adjudged to have finished the COVID-affected 2019–20 season in 4th place in the League on average points per game; they reached the play-off final but lost 2–1 to Wycombe Wanderers. The following season Oxford again reached the play-off places, finishing 6th in League One before losing to Blackpool in the first round of the playoffs 6–3 on aggregate.

On 26 February 2023, Robinson was sacked by the club following a run of eight games without a win, his last match in charge being a 3–0 home defeat to Bristol Rovers the previous day.

=== Leeds United ===
On 3 May 2023, Robinson was appointed as the new assistant manager of Leeds United, under new manager Sam Allardyce, with whom Robinson had worked at Blackburn Rovers.

=== Salford City ===
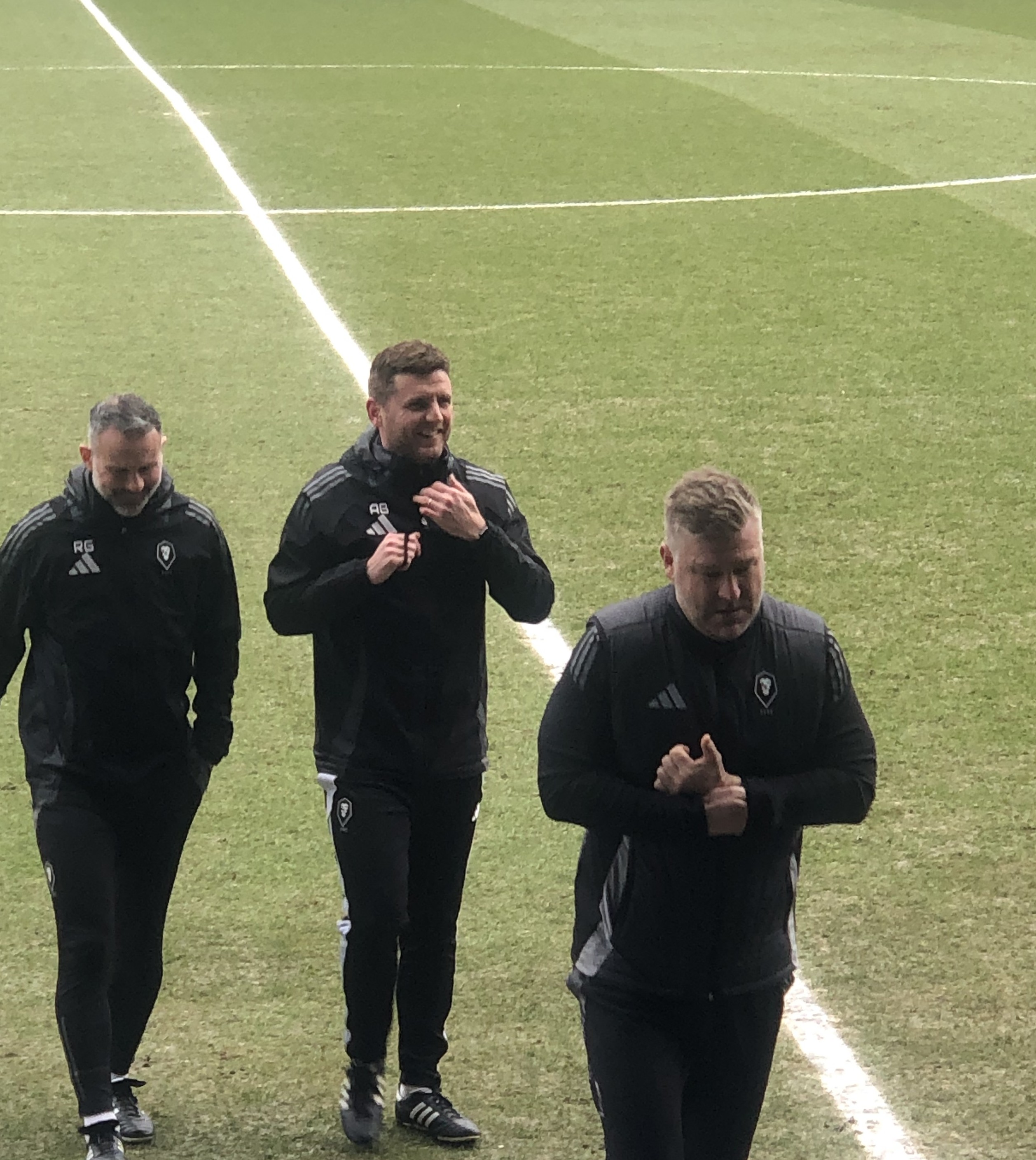
Robinson (right) with Salford City in 2025

On 5 January 2024, Robinson was appointed head coach of League Two club Salford City. Robinson was sent off 14 minutes into his first game in charge for interfering with a throw-in. He oversaw an eight-game unbeaten run at the start of his tenure to haul Salford away from the bottom two, and ensured the club's survival in the Football League by the end of the season.

In February 2024 he brought in former Manchester United and Hull City defender Alex Bruce as assistant. Robinson achieved a number of club records in his first full season in charge of Salford, including the club's longest winning run in the Football League (6 games in December 2024 to January 2025), and he guided the club to the FA Cup third round for the first time ever with wins against League One Shrewsbury Town in the first round, and Cheltenham Town in the second. Salford were rewarded with a trip to Premier League champions Manchester City which they lost 8–0. In the first round game against Shrewsbury, Robinson brought on Marshall Heys towards the end of the game who became the youngest player to play for a professional club in the competition, aged 15 years, 2 months and 6 days. He has now fielded three of the youngest 10 players in FA Cup history. On 2 June 2026, Robinson was dismissed by Salford City after failing to win the play-offs.

=== Bromley ===
On 5 November 2026, Robinson was appointed manager of League One club Bromley on a long-term contract.

== Personal life ==
Robinson was born in Liverpool and grew up with his parents and younger brother and sister. He joined Everton's academy as a 10-year-old before moving to Swindon Town at 16, where he started to suffer from back problems. Whilst playing in non-league at 22, a chance meeting with Steve Highway and Bill Bygroves turned Robinson's career to coaching, and since he has only spent eight months out of the game having worked with multiple age groups from Under-9s to Under-18s, and coached from League Two up to the Premier League.

At 29 years old, Robinson became the youngest person to obtain a UEFA Pro Licence, and at the time became the youngest manager in the Football League when he took over at MK Dons in May 2010.

Robinson has one daughter, who was born in 2006. In 2010, he married actress Ann-Marie Davies who was in Brookside, and the pair divorced in 2024 with Robinson having endured personal challenges while managing at Oxford which contributed to his departure.

Robinson has appeared as a regular pundit on TalkSPORT and Sky Sports.

== Managerial statistics ==
As of match played 21 November 2026

Managerial record by team and tenure
Team	From	To	Record					Ref.
Team	From	To	P	W	D	L	Win %	Ref.
Milton Keynes Dons	10 May 2010	23 October 2016	346	147	81	118	42.5	
Charlton Athletic	28 November 2016 (Note: Robinson's appointment was announced on 24 November 2016 but did not take effect until 28 November. The intervening match against Sheffield United was taken by caretaker manager Kevin Nugent.)	22 March 2018	74	27	21	26	36.5	
Oxford United	22 March 2018	26 February 2023	274	110	70	94	40.1	
Salford City	5 January 2024	2 June 2026	132	59	31	42	44.7	
Bromley	5 November 2026	Present	3	1	0	2	33.3	
Total			829	344	203	282	41.5	

== Honours ==
=== As a manager ===
Milton Keynes Dons

- Football League One runners-up: 2014–15

Individual

- Football League One Manager of the Month: August 2011, January 2015, April 2015
