= 1999–2000 in Belgian football =

Football in Belgium
- Season: 1999–2000

The 1999–2000 season was the 97th competitive season in Belgian football.

== National team ==
Belgium qualified for the Euro 2000 as a host but could not even reach the quarter-finals.

Date	Venue	Opponents	Score*	Comp	Belgium scorers	Match Report
August 18, 1999	Jan Breydel Stadion, Bruges (H)	Finland	3-4	F	Sandy Martens, Marc Wilmots, Emile Mpenza	www.footbel.be
September 4, 1999	Feijenoord Stadion, Rotterdam (A)	Netherlands	5-5	F	Branko Strupar (2), Bart Goor, Marc Wilmots, Emile Mpenza	www.footbel.be
September 7, 1999	Stade Maurice Dufrasne, Liège (H)	Morocco	4–0	F	Lorenzo Staelens, Johan Walem, Emile Mpenza, Branko Strupar	www.footbel.be
November 13, 1999	Stadio Via del Mare, Lecce (A)	Italy	3-1	F	Gilles De Bilde, Marc Wilmots, Bart Goor	www.footbel.be
February 23, 2000	Stade du Pays de Charleroi, Charleroi (H)	Portugal	1-1	F	Branko Strupar	www.footbel.be
March 29, 2000	King Baudouin Stadium, Brussels (H)	Netherlands	2-2	F	Emile Mpenza, Gert Verheyen	www.footbel.be
April 26, 2000	Ullevaal Stadium, Oslo (A)	Norway	2-0	F	Gert Verheyen (2)	www.footbel.be
June 3, 2000	Parken Stadium, Copenhagen (A)	Denmark	2-2	F	Lorenzo Staelens, Marc Wilmots	www.footbel.be
June 10, 2000	King Baudouin Stadium, Brussels (H)	Sweden	2-1	ECFR	Bart Goor, Emile Mpenza	www.footbel.be
June 14, 2000	King Baudouin Stadium, Brussels (H)	Italy	0-2	ECFR		www.footbel.be
June 19, 2000	King Baudouin Stadium, Brussels (H)	Turkey	0-2	ECFR		www.footbel.be

* Belgium score given first

Key

- H = Home match
- A = Away match
- F = Friendly
- ECFR = UEFA European Championship, First Round
- og = own goal

== Honours ==
Competition	Winner
Jupiler League	Anderlecht
Cup	Genk
Supercup	Anderlecht
Second division	Antwerp
Third division A	K.F.C. Strombeek
Third division B	K.S.K. Heusden-Zolder

== See also ==
- Belgian First Division 1999-2000
- 2000 Belgian Super Cup
- Belgian Second Division
- Belgian Third Division: divisions A and B
- Belgian Promotion: divisions A, B, C and D
