= Daniel Powell =

British footballer (born 1991)

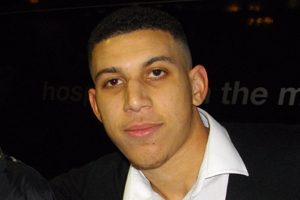
- Powell with Milton Keynes Dons in 2011

Personal information
- Full name: Daniel Vendrys Powell
- Date of birth: 12 March 1991 (age 35)
- Place of birth: Luton, England
- Height: 6 ft 2 in (1.88 m)
- Positions: Winger; striker

Youth career
- –2008: Milton Keynes Dons

Senior career*
Years	Team	Apps	(Gls)
2008–2017	Milton Keynes Dons	231	(37)
2009	→ Crawley Town (loan)	3	(0)
2009–2010	→ Forest Green Rovers (loan)	24	(6)
2010	→ Darlington (loan)	5	(1)
2017–2019	Northampton Town	64	(8)
2019–2021	Crewe Alexandra	54	(10)
2021–2023	Barnet	34	(6)
2023–2024	Hemel Hempstead Town	8	(0)
- * Club domestic league appearances and goals as of 16:08, 6 May 2023 (UTC)

Daniel Vendrys Powell (born 12 March 1991) is an English professional footballer who plays as a winger or a striker.

Powell started his career with Milton Keynes Dons, and made his first-team debut aged 17 in 2008. He had loan spells with Crawley Town, Forest Green Rovers and Darlington. In both 2010–11 (during which he scored 10 goals) and 2011–12 (11 goals), he helped Milton Keynes Dons reach the play-offs. Powell was a member of the Milton Keynes Dons team that won promotion to the Championship in 2015. Released by Milton Keynes Dons in 2017, he joined Northampton Town before moving to Crewe Alexandra two years later.

== Career ==
=== Milton Keynes Dons ===
Born in Luton, Bedfordshire, Powell joined Milton Keynes Dons academy and made his professional debut for the club in a 3–1 victory over Hartlepool United on 15 November 2008, coming on as a substitute in the 84th minute and scoring the team's final goal in the 90th minute.

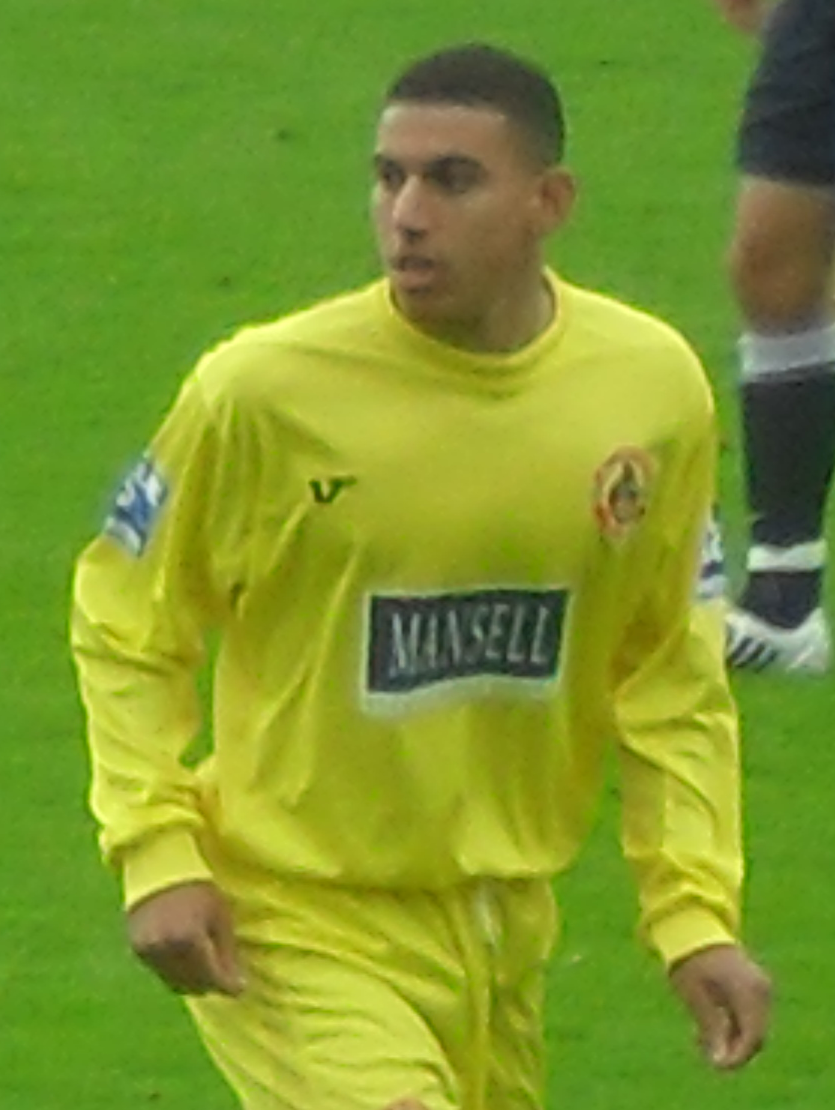
Powell playing for Crawley Town in 2009

==== Crawley Town (loan) ====
Powell joined Conference Premier club Crawley Town on loan on 3 August 2009, making three league appearances before returning to Milton Keynes Dons.

==== Forest Green (loan) ====
Powell was loaned out once more, this time to Conference Premier club Forest Green Rovers. He made his debut for the club on 17 October 2009 in a 5–2 defeat away to Histon. His first goal for the club was the third in a 3–1 win over Salisbury City on Boxing Day 2009. Powell became a regular with Forest Green and the club decided to extend his loan until the end of 2009–10 in January 2010. He completed the loan spell with 29 appearances and six goals.

==== Darlington (loan) ====
Having not made an appearance for Milton Keynes Dons at the beginning of the 2010–11 season, Powell joined Conference Premier club Darlington on a one-month loan on 1 October 2010. He made his debut for the club the next day in a 1–0 defeat at home to Wrexham. Three days later, Powell scored his first goal for the club in a 2–1 defeat away to Rushden & Diamonds. He made a further three league appearances during his loan spell.

=== Return to Milton Keynes Dons ===
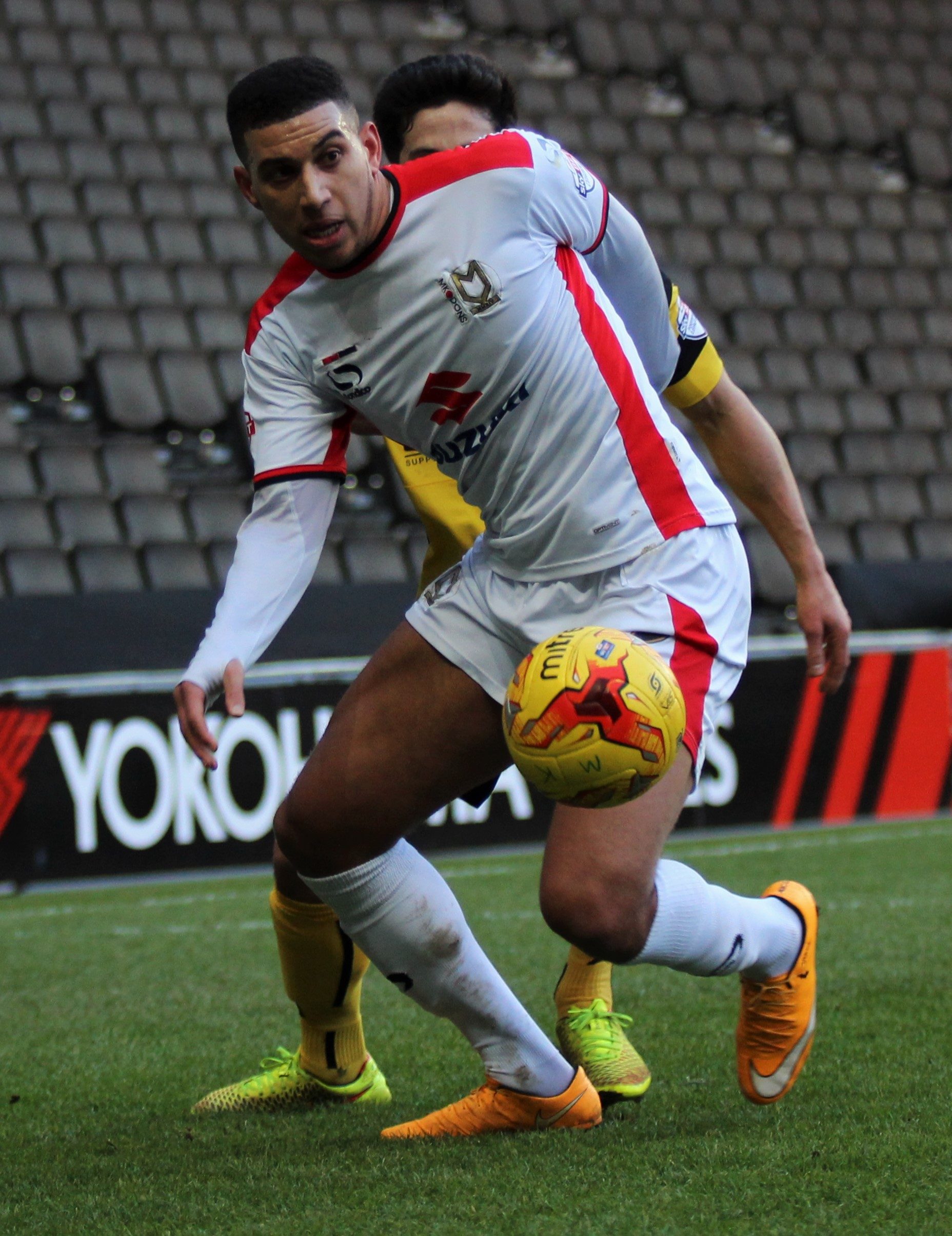
Powell playing for Milton Keynes Dons in 2015

Powell returned to Milton Keynes Dons in November 2010 and began to break into the first team, becoming a regular in the starting lineup after the sales of Aaron Wilbraham to Norwich City and Jermaine Easter to Crystal Palace left the club with just two senior strikers. Powell went on to score nine goals in 29 league appearances for the club in the 2010–11 season. On 5 March 2013, Powell signed a two-year extension to his current Milton Keynes Dons deal, keeping him at the club until June 2015. Powell netted eight times in 42 league appearances in 2014–15, as Milton Keynes Dons were promoted to the Championship as League One runners-up.

On 18 July 2015, Powell signed another two-year extension tying him to the club through June 2017. Milton Keynes Dons were relegated back to League One after only one season, with Powell making 22 league appearances, scoring twice in 2015–16.

On 2 May 2017, Powell was one of three players released by Milton Keynes Dons when his contract expired at the end of 2016–17. Having graduated from the club's academy, Powell made 271 appearances and scored 46 goals for the club across nine seasons.

=== Northampton Town ===
On 5 May 2017, Powell signed a two-year contract with League One rivals Northampton Town, and would join the club on 1 July following the expiration of his Milton Keynes Dons contract.

=== Crewe Alexandra ===
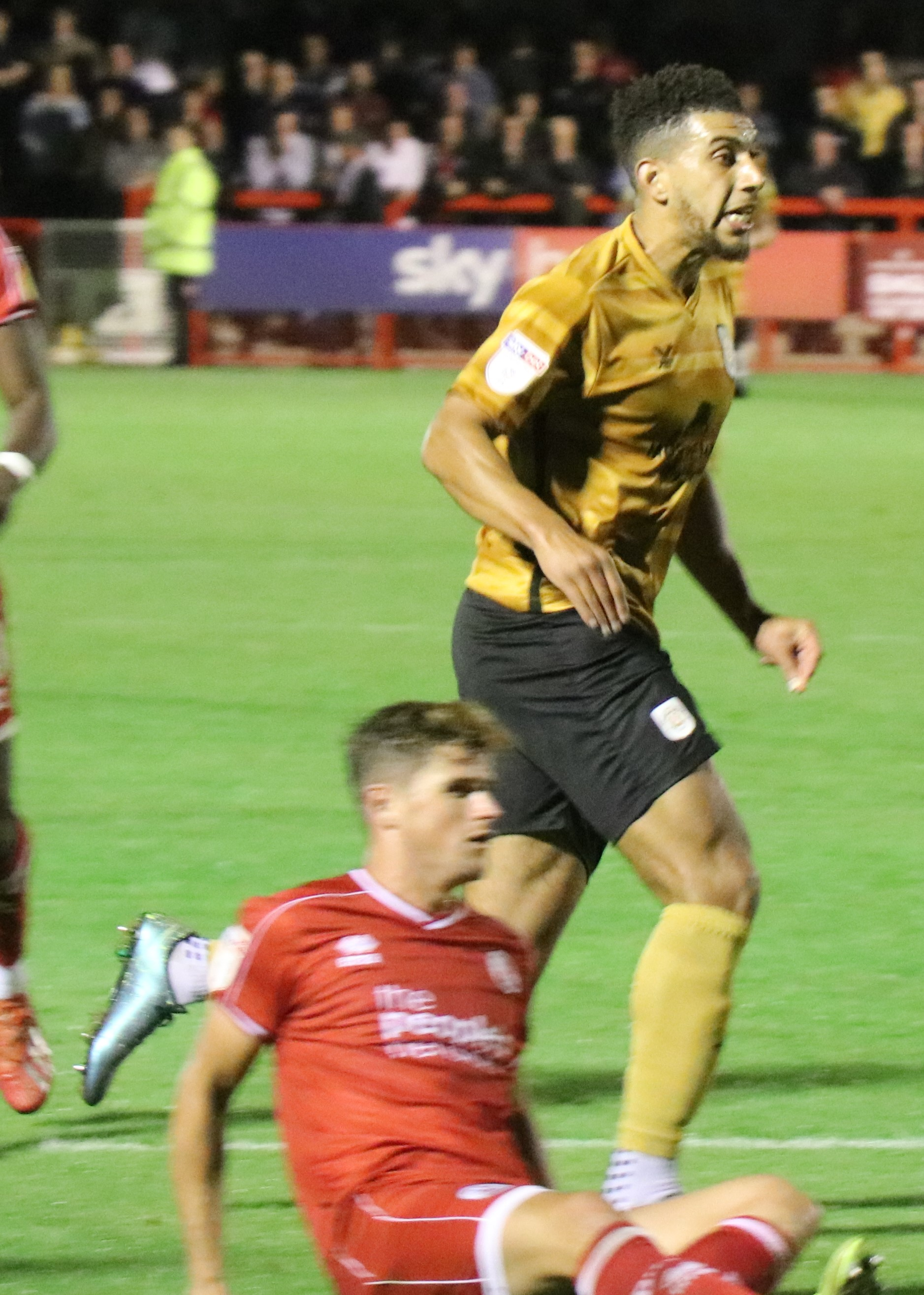
Powell playing for Crewe Alexandra in 2019

Powell signed for League Two club Crewe Alexandra on 7 June 2019 on a two-year contract, with the option of a further year. He scored his first goal for Crewe in a 4–2 away win over Carlisle United on 12 October. He scored nine goals in 33 appearances in his first season at promotion-winning Crewe, but started just 12 League One games the following season. On 13 May 2021, Crewe announced that Powell was being released by the club.

=== Barnet ===
Following his release from Crewe, Powell joined National League side Barnet on a two-year deal. Powell scored the winner against Plymouth Parkway in the third round of the FA Trophy in December 2022.

Having been defeated in the play-offs, Powell was released at the end of the 2022–23 season.

=== Hemel Hempstead Town ===
Powell joined Hemel Hempstead Town in August 2023.

== Style of play ==
Powell has been described as being a forward thinking player who often runs at full-backs and is a strong asset down the flanks. His unpredictable nature is often an asset and at times a flaw in his character but remains an important player when on the field.

== Career statistics ==
As of end of 2022–23 season

Appearances and goals by club, season and competition
Club	Season	League			FA Cup		League Cup		Other		Total	
Club	Season	Division	Apps	Goals	Apps	Goals	Apps	Goals	Apps	Goals	Apps	Goals
Milton Keynes Dons	2008–09	League One	7	1	0	0	0	0	0	0	7	1
Milton Keynes Dons	2009–10	League One	2	1	—		0	0	0	0	2	1
Milton Keynes Dons	2010–11	League One	29	9	1	0	0	0	2 (Note: Appearances in League One play-offs)	1	32	10
Milton Keynes Dons	2011–12	League One	43	6	4	2	3	2	3 (Note: One appearance in Football League Trophy, two appearances and one goal in League One play-offs)	1	53	11
Milton Keynes Dons	2012–13	League One	34	7	2	0	2	0	1 (Note: Appearance in Football League Trophy)	0	39	7
Milton Keynes Dons	2013–14	League One	32	1	3	0	0	0	1	0	36	1
Milton Keynes Dons	2014–15	League One	42	8	2	0	4	1	1	1	49	10
Milton Keynes Dons	2015–16	Championship	22	2	2	0	2	0	—		26	2
Milton Keynes Dons	2016–17	League One	20	2	3	1	1	0	3 (Note: Appearance(s) in EFL Trophy)	0	27	3
Milton Keynes Dons	Total		231	37	17	3	12	3	11	3	271	46
Crawley Town (loan)	2009–10	Conference Premier	3	0	—		—		—		3	0
Forest Green Rovers (loan)	2009–10	Conference Premier	24	6	4	0	—		1 (Note: Appearance in FA Trophy)	0	29	6
Darlington (loan)	2010–11	Conference Premier	5	1	—		—		—		5	1
Northampton Town	2017–18	League One	29	2	1	0	0	0	2	0	32	2
Northampton Town	2018–19	League Two	35	6	1	0	0	0	5	0	41	6
Northampton Town	Total		64	8	2	0	0	0	7	0	73	8
Crewe Alexandra	2019–20	League Two	30	9	3	0	0	0	0	0	33	9
Crewe Alexandra	2020–21	League One	24	1	2	0	0	0	1	2	27	3
Crewe Alexandra	Total		54	10	5	0	0	0	1	2	60	12
Barnet	2021–22	National League	25	6	1	0	0	0	2 (Note: Appearances in Middlesex Senior Cup)	1	28	7
Barnet	2022–23	National League	9	0	0	0	0	0	1	1	10	1
Barnet	Total		34	6	1	0	0	0	3	2	38	8
Career total			415	67	29	3	12	3	23	7	478	81

== Honours ==
Milton Keynes Dons

- Football League One runner-up: 2014–15

Individual

- Milton Keynes Dons Young Player of the Year: 2010–11
