= Lewis Guy =

English footballer (born 1985)

Personal information
- Full name: Lewis Brett Guy
- Date of birth: 22 August 1985 (age 41)
- Place of birth: Penrith, England
- Position: Forward

Youth career
- 2003–2004: Newcastle United

Senior career*
Years	Team	Apps	(Gls)
2004–2005	Newcastle United	0	(0)
2005	→ Doncaster Rovers (loan)	9	(3)
2005–2010	Doncaster Rovers	139	(15)
2009	→ Hartlepool United (loan)	4	(0)
2010	→ Oldham Athletic (loan)	12	(3)
2010–2012	Milton Keynes Dons	35	(2)
2011	→ Oxford United (loan)	6	(1)
2011	→ Oxford United (loan)	2	(0)
2012–2013	St Mirren	29	(5)
2013–2014	Carlisle United	23	(1)
2014–2015	Gateshead	12	(2)
2015	Barrow	11	(1)
2015–2016	Chorley	12	(1)
2016	Annan Athletic	14	(2)
Total		308	(36)
- * Club domestic league appearances and goals

Lewis Brett Guy (born 22 August 1985) is an English former footballer who played as a forward. He last played for Annan Athletic.

== Club career ==
=== Newcastle ===
Guy started his career at Newcastle United and appeared for them once in the UEFA Cup.

=== Doncaster ===
Guy joined Doncaster Rovers on loan during the 2004–05 season. Having impressed during his brief loan spell, scoring three goals in nine appearances, Guy signed a permanent deal with Dave Penney's side prior to the start of the 2005–06 season.

Despite only scoring three goals in 31 league appearances throughout the 2005–06 season, Guy's pace and dribbling ability made him a handful for any defence, which helped him form an effective striking partnership with Paul Heffernan during the first half of the season.

The 2007–08 season seemed to bring a change to Guy's play, as he started to weigh in with vital goals and impressive performances, finishing the season with 8 goals in all competitions, his best in a season to date. Despite scoring the winning goal in the opening game of the 2008–09 season against Derby County and the opening goal in the following match against Cardiff City, he struggled to continue his positive start to the season and failed to score another goal for Doncaster. In early 2009, Guy spent a month's loan spell at Hartlepool United, but he struggled to make an impact at Victoria Park, and was sent back to Doncaster after he picked up an injury.

=== Oldham Athletic ===
In 2010, he joined Oldham Athletic on loan, initially for a month, which was later extended until the end of the season. He made 12 appearances for the club, scoring 3 goals, his first for any team in any competition in over two years.

=== Milton Keynes Dons ===
On 19 May 2010 Guy joined League One outfit Milton Keynes Dons on a free transfer, following his release by Doncaster. He signed a two-year contract.

On 9 August 2011, it was announced that Guy had joined Oxford United on a month-long loan deal. Guy returned to his parent club following Oxford's 2–2 draw with Burton Albion on 10 September 2011, having scored once in six appearances for the U's. He returned to Oxford for a second one-month loan on 24 November.

=== St Mirren ===
On 6 January 2012, Guy was released from his contract with the MK Dons and during January had a trial with Scottish Premier League club St Mirren; on 24 March 2012, he had signed a pre-contract agreement with the club, linking up again with Tommy Craig, who coached Guy at Newcastle United. Guy scored his first goal for St Mirren in a 2–2 draw with Inverness Caley Thistle on 4 August 2012. Guy Scored his second goal for the club in a Scottish league cup match at home against Ayr United which finished 5–1 to St Mirren. Guy was on the score sheet again for the Buddies when Hearts travelled to Paisley. His goal meant that St Mirren were 3rd in the table after the first six matches of the season.

Guy was released from his contract by mutual consent on 5 July 2013.

=== Carlisle United ===
After a long pre-season trial, Carlisle United signed Guy on 25 July on a one-year contract. He scored his first goal in a League Cup victory over Blackburn Rovers on 7 August. He was released at the end of the season.

=== Gateshead ===
On 1 July 2014, Guy signed a one-year deal with Conference Premier outfit Gateshead. He made his debut on 9 August 2014, scoring the opening goal in a 3–1 victory over Torquay United. On 21 January 2015, Guy left the Tynesiders by mutual agreement.

=== Barrow ===
After his release by Gateshead, Guy joined Barrow until the end of the season. He was released at the end of the season.

=== Chorley ===
Guy turned down a move to Workington in favour of Chorley, whom he signed for on 1 August 2015.

=== Annan Athletic ===
On 1 February 2016, Guy signed for Scottish League Two side Annan Athletic. He has retired from professional football.

== Honours ==
Doncaster Rovers

- Football League One play-offs: 2008
- Football League Trophy: 2006–07
