= Ben Reeves =

Footballer (born 1991)

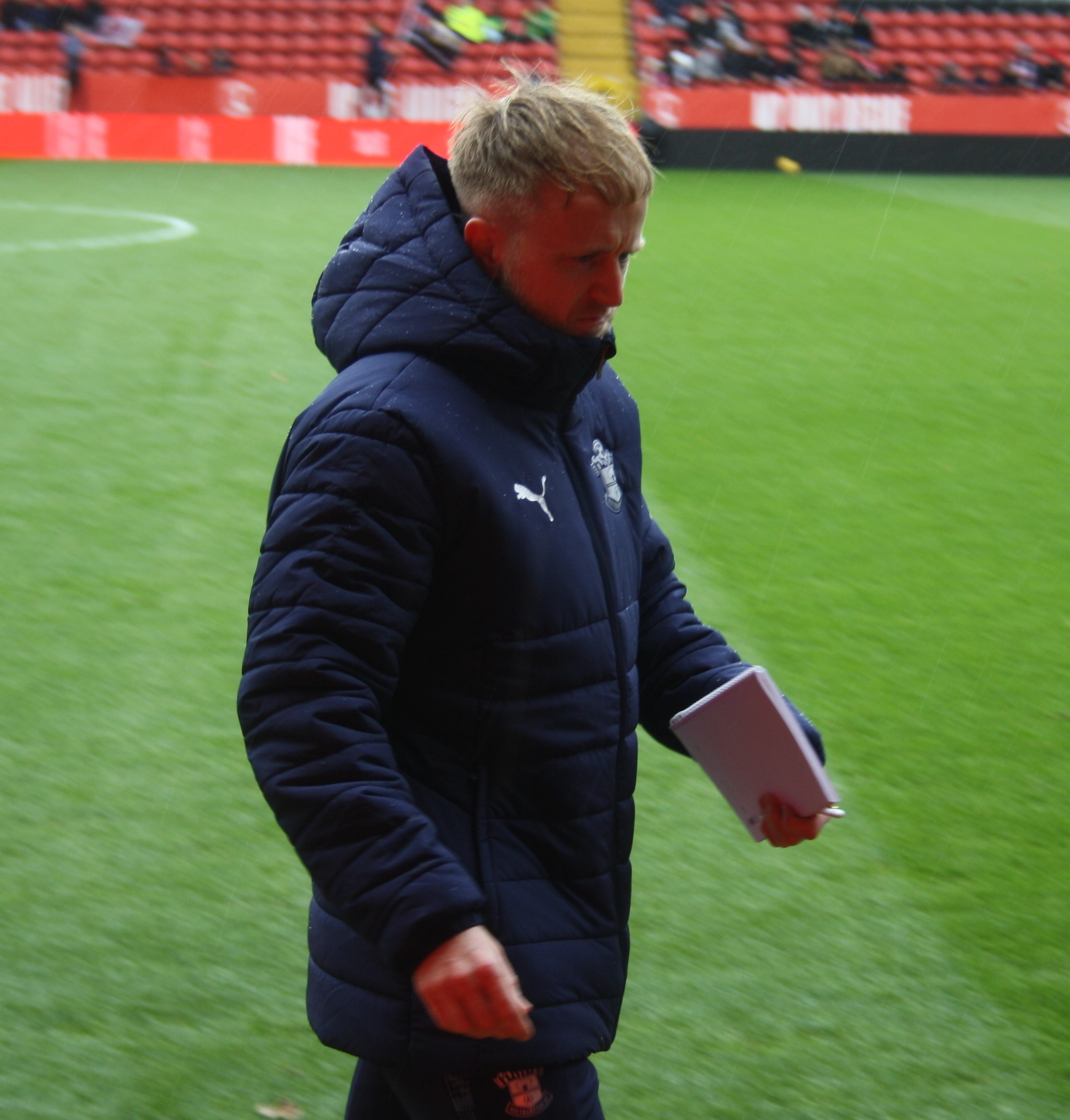
- Reeves in 2025

Personal information
- Full name: Benjamin Neil Reeves
- Date of birth: 19 November 1991 (age 34)
- Place of birth: Verwood, England
- Height: 5 ft 10 in (1.78 m)
- Position: Midfielder

Youth career
- 2001–2011: Southampton

Senior career*
Years	Team	Apps	(Gls)
2011–2013	Southampton	5	(0)
2012	→ Dagenham & Redbridge (loan)	5	(0)
2013	→ Southend United (loan)	6	(1)
2013	→ Southend United (loan)	4	(0)
2013–2017	Milton Keynes Dons	110	(24)
2017–2019	Charlton Athletic	58	(7)
2019–2020	Milton Keynes Dons	17	(1)
2020–2021	Plymouth Argyle	28	(0)
2021–2023	Gillingham	35	(2)
2024	Eastleigh	13	(1)
Total		281	(36)

International career
2014–2015	Northern Ireland	2	(0)
- * Club domestic league appearances and goals

Benjamin Neil Reeves (born 19 November 1991) is a professional football coach and former player who is an Under-21s support player at EFL Championship club Southampton. Born in England, he has been capped twice for the Northern Ireland national team.

== Club career ==
=== Southampton ===
Having started out in the youth team as a left back, he was later converted into an attacking midfielder. On 5 April 2011, Reeves signed his first professional contract on a two-year deal.

On 21 September 2011, he made his debut for Southampton, playing the full 90 minutes in the League Cup third round match against Preston North End. He set up the first goal in a 2–1 win. At the start of the 2012–13 season, Reeves scored his first goal for Southampton against Stevenage in the League Cup on 28 August 2012. He made his Premier League debut as a substitute in a 3–1 defeat against Everton at Goodison Park on 29 September.

On 4 June 2013, at the end of the 2012–13 season, Reeves was released by Southampton.

==== Dagenham & Redbridge (loan) ====
He joined Dagenham & Redbridge on a month's loan on 23 February 2012, making his debut for the club two days later, in a 0–0 draw against Plymouth Argyle. Reeves made five appearances before returning to his parent club.

==== Southend (loan) ====
After six first-team appearances for the Saints in 2012–13, on 31 January 2013 Reeves joined Southend United on loan for a month. He scored his first goal for the club on 12 February, in a 2–1 defeat at home to Cheltenham Town. Eight days later, Reeves scored his second goal for the club, in the last minutes of the Football League Trophy Southern Area Final, as Southend beat Leyton Orient 3–2 on aggregate, to send the club to the final.

On 15 March 2013, it was announced that Reeves had re-joined Southend United on loan, until the end of the season, in his second spell at the club. Reeves played his first match in his second loan spell, providing an assist for Freddy Eastwood, in a 1–1 draw against Torquay United. Reeves played in the final of the Football League Trophy against Crewe, where he came on as a substitute for Bilel Mohsni in the 57th minute, as Southend lost 2–0.

=== Milton Keynes Dons ===
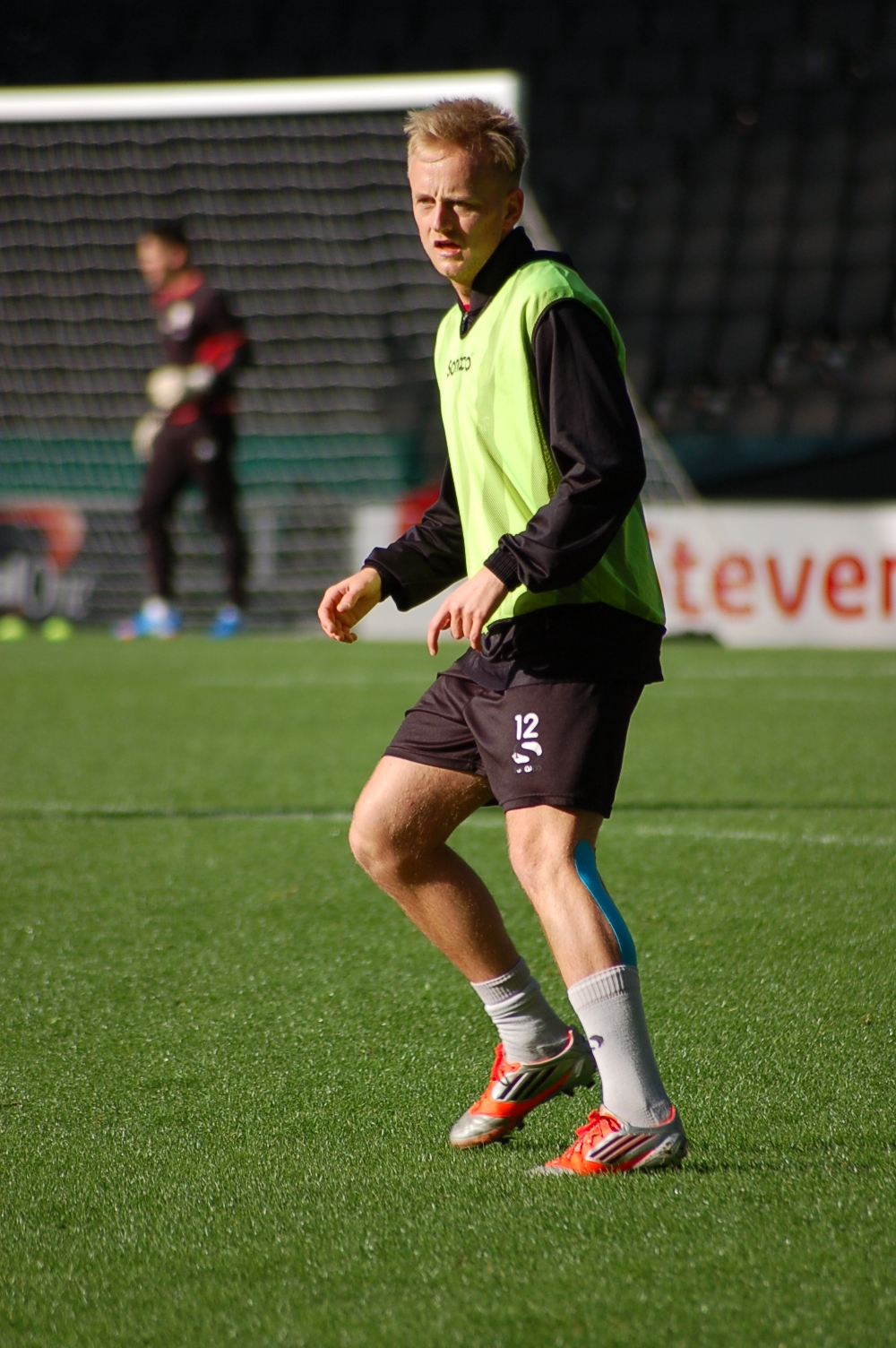
Reeves training with Milton Keynes Dons in 2013

On 13 July 2013, Reeves signed for Milton Keynes Dons on a one-year contract.

==== 2013–14 season ====
After appearing on the bench in the opening game of the season against Shrewsbury Town, Reeves scored on his debut in the first round of the League Cup, with a 2–1 victory over Northampton Town. Three days later, Reeves made his league debut for the club, playing as a left-back, in a 1–0 win over Crewe. After appearing on the bench throughout August and September, Reeves played in an unusual position as a striker when he scored his league goal of the season, in a 3–2 win over Rotherham United on 19 October 2013. December saw Reeves scored three against Dover Athletic in the second league round of FA Cup and then followed up, scoring two league goals against Wolverhampton Wanderers and Port Vale. January then saw Reeves scored three goals, including twice against Wigan Athletic and Bristol City. Reeves later scored two league goals in February against Walsall and Oldham Athletic Unfortunately, Reeves suffered a hamstring injury that kept him out for two games and scored on his return from injury, in a 1–0 win over Stevenage on 22 March 2014 (which later earned him award for March's Goal of the Month). However, his return was short-lived when he suffered ankle ligament damage that saw him out for the remainder of the 2013–14 season.

Despite this, Reeves won four award (includes Player of the Year, Players' Player of the Year, MKDSA Player of the Year and Goal of the Year) at the club's award ceremony, as well as, included for the LKO Team of the Season. Not only that, the club opted to take up their option of a contract extension that would ensure Reeves remained under contract for the 2014–15 season. Reeves finished his first season at Milton Keynes Dons, making thirty-five appearances and scoring eleven times in all competitions.

==== 2014–15 season ====
At the start of the 2014–15 season, Reeves returned from injury and resumed pre-season training. At the beginning of July, Reeves signed a contract extension, keeping him at the Dons until 2016.

It took until 13 September 2014 for Reeves score his first goal of the 2014–15 season, in a 5–3 win over Barnsley, which he followed up by scoring seven days later, in a 6–1 win over Crewe. His third goal later came on 29 November 2014, in a 6–0 win over Colchester United. Reeves was out throughout December when he suffered a hamstring injury.

After appearing two games in mid-January, Reeves was again out injured but returned from the sidelines to score in a 4–2 win over Gillingham on 14 February 2015, followed up scoring twice seven days later, in a 3–0 win over Peterborough United, which earned him Man of the Match award for his good performance. Then on 17 March 2015, Reeves scored his seventh goal of the season, in a 3–1 win over Oldham Athletic.

However, Reeves suffered a calf problem while on international duty, resulting in him initially being ruled out for the remainder of the 2014–15 season. Despite this, Reeves returned to full training in early-May, and made his return to the first team, where he came on as a substitute for Samir Carruthers in the 73rd minute, and set up the fifth goal for Dean Lewington, in a 5–1 win over Yeovil Town on the final day of the season to earn their first promotion to the Championship. His second season saw Reeves make thirty-six appearances and score seven times in all competitions.

==== 2015–16 season ====
Reeves played his first Championship game in the opening match of the 2015–16 season, where he set up a goal for Dean Bowditch, in a 4–1 win over Rotherham United. Three days after that, Reeves signed a contract extension with the club, keeping him at the Dons until 2017. However, on 21 August, Reeves suffered a hamstring injury, which he sustained during a match against Preston North End which ruled him out for a month.

He made his return to the side on 19 September when he came on as a substitute in a 2–1 defeat by Leeds United. Reeves scored twice against Blackburn Rovers on 17 October, helping his team to a 3–0 victory, their first in the league since mid-August.

=== Charlton Athletic ===
On 3 August 2017, Reeves signed for League One side Charlton Athletic on a two-year contract., rejoining his former manager, Karl Robinson. He scored his first goal for Charlton in an EFL Trophy tie against Crawley Town on 29 August 2017. He was released by Charlton at the end of the 2018–19 season.

=== Return to Milton Keynes Dons ===
On 1 August 2019, Reeves returned to Milton Keynes Dons on a free transfer for a second spell having spent much of pre-season training with the club. Despite enjoying a mostly injury-free season, Reeves was one of nine players released from the club at the conclusion of the campaign. In August 2020 he was on trial at Plymouth Argyle.

=== Plymouth Argyle ===
On 3 September 2020, Reeves signed for League One club Plymouth Argyle having spent a week on trial. He scored his first goal for Plymouth on 10 November 2020 in an EFL Trophy group game against Newport County.

=== Gillingham ===
Following his release from Plymouth at the conclusion of the 2020–21 season, Reeves signed for fellow League One side Gillingham.

He was released by the club at the end of the 2022–23 season.

=== Eastleigh ===
On 1 February 2024, Reeves joined National League club Eastleigh. He departed the club at the end of the 2023–24 season.

== Coaching career ==
On 15 August 2024, Reeves re-joined Southampton as part of the Under-21s setup, with his role seeing him support youth players within the academy.

== International career ==
Reeves received his first international call-up for Northern Ireland in February 2014, qualifying as his grandparents hail from Fermanagh. He made his debut on 14 October 2014, when he came on as a substitute in a Euro 2016 qualifier match against Greece, described as "a high-pressure debut".

== Career statistics ==
Appearances and goals by club, season and competition
Club	Season	League			FA Cup		League Cup		Other		Total	
Club	Season	Division	Apps	Goals	Apps	Goals	Apps	Goals	Apps	Goals	Apps	Goals
Southampton	2011–12	Championship	2	0	3	0	2	0	—		7	0
Southampton	2012–13	Premier League	3	0	0	0	3	1	—		6	1
Southampton	Total		5	0	3	0	5	1	—		13	1
Dagenham & Redbridge (loan)	2011–12	League Two	5	0	0	0	0	0	0	0	5	0
Southend United (loan)	2012–13	League Two	10	1	0	0	0	0	3	1	13	2
Milton Keynes Dons	2013–14	League One	28	7	3	3	2	1	2	0	35	11
Milton Keynes Dons	2014–15	League One	30	7	2	0	4	0	0	0	36	7
Milton Keynes Dons	2015–16	Championship	18	3	2	1	2	0	—		22	4
Milton Keynes Dons	2016–17	League One	34	7	4	2	1	0	3	1	41	10
Milton Keynes Dons	Total		110	24	11	6	9	1	4	1	134	32
Charlton Athletic	2017–18	League One	29	3	1	2	1	0	5 (Note: Four appearances in the EFL Trophy and one in the League One play-offs)	2	36	7
Charlton Athletic	2018–19	League One	29	4	1	0	0	0	2 (Note: Appearance(s) in EFL Trophy)	0	32	4
Charlton Athletic	Total		58	7	2	2	1	0	7	2	68	11
Milton Keynes Dons	2019–20	League One	17	1	1	0	0	0	1	0	19	1
Plymouth Argyle	2020–21	League One	28	0	2	1	0	0	2	1	32	2
Gillingham	2021–22	League One	20	2	2	0	1	0	3	0	26	2
Gillingham	2022–23	League Two	15	0	3	0	3	0	1	0	22	0
Gillingham	Total		35	2	5	0	4	0	4	0	48	2
Eastleigh	2023–24	National League	13	1	0	0	0	0	0	0	13	1
Career total			281	36	24	9	19	2	22	5	346	52

== Honours ==
Southend United

- Football League Trophy runner-up: 2012–13

Milton Keynes Dons

- Football League One runner-up: 2014–15

Charlton Athletic

- EFL League One play-offs: 2019

Individual

- Milton Keynes Dons Player of the Year: 2013–14
- Milton Keynes Dons Player's Player of the Year: 2013–14
