= 2013–14 Newport County A.F.C. season =

Welsh association football club season

Newport County
2013–14 season
- Chairman: Les Scadding
- Manager: Justin Edinburgh
- Stadium: Rodney Parade
- League Two: 14th
- FA Cup: Second round
- League Cup: Second round
- League Trophy: Southern Area semi-finals
- Top goalscorer: League: Chris Zebroski (12); All: Chris Zebroski (13)
- Highest home attendance: 5,387 vs Bristol Rovers (17 August 2013)
- Lowest home attendance: 2,160 vs Bury (25 March 2014)
- Average home league attendance: 3,398
Home colours	Away colours	Third colours

The 2013–14 season was Newport County's first season in Football League Two, 61st season in the Football League and 93rd season of league football overall. This season marked County's return to the Football League for the first time since the 1987–88 season. The club finished the season in 14th place.

== Season review ==
=== League ===
==== 2013 ====
The season started with the visit of Accrington Stanley. This game was selected as one of the Football League's "anniversary fixtures" to mark the 125th anniversary of the first Football League season. With Harry Worley scoring the historic first League goal, a brace from Chris Zebroski and a goal from Christian Jolley 10 minutes into the second half, County won 4–1 and were top of the League Two table. In the next game away to Northampton, Conor Washington scored his first League goal but the club suffered a 3–1 loss. The next home game, the Severnside derby with Bristol Rovers saw County's highest gate of the season; Andy Sandell's first-half penalty being enough to take all three points. The next three games were all drawn 1–1 with County slipping out of the play-off places as a result. The next home game, against Morecambe, will forever be remembered as the "Tom Naylor game": Scoring within three minutes, Billy Jones had made the perfect start to his début game before Naylor scored an own goal to level the match. Robbie Willmott restored Newport's lead before Naylor's second own goal again levelled things. With 20 minutes remaining Naylor conceded a penalty which allowed Morecambe to take the lead and eventually win the game. County's first away win of the season in the next game at Exeter, followed by a home win to Torquay United took County back to the brink of the play-off positions, but following the next two games they were back down to 12th. County then embarked on a successful spell, losing only once at Fleetwood until visiting Burton Albion in the last game of 2013. That last game was lost 1–0, but County finished the year in a play-off position.

==== 2014 ====
The new year began in a disastrous fashion: The wettest winter on record in Britain combined with drainage problems with the Rodney Parade pitch caused a rash of game postponements. County failed to beat bottom-of-the-table Northampton and were denied even one point when Andy Sandell's 88th-minute penalty was saved. Previous wins against Accrington, Bristol, Southend and Hartlepool were cancelled out with only two draws to show from the four matches. A solitary home win against Oxford United lifted County back to the brink of the play-offs again, but then another terrible run resulted in only three points from the next eight games. With County now lying in 14th position, any hope of the play-offs was gone. County's first double of the season against Torquay in next game briefly lifted them to 12th, but following the second 0–0 draw with Bury of the season, previous wins against Portsmouth and Chesterfield were cancelled out. Following a home loss against Plymouth Argyle County recorded only their third win of 2014 against relegation-threatened Wycombe Wanderers. In the next two games County squandered leads to draw both games, slipping down to their lowest league position of the season in the process. The penultimate game of the season was the trip to promotion-chasing York. County failed to improve on their recent form as the home side guaranteed themselves a play-off place with a 1–0 win. The final game of the season against Rochdale was an eerie reminder of County's last Football League season in 1987–88. That time the visitors has triumphed 1–0 and they would be hoping for another win to seal the League Two title. Despite taking the lead in the 28th minute, Aaron O'Connor cancelled out the advantage just before half time. Rochdale should have won the game after winning a penalty in the 83rd minute, but Matthew Lund's penalty was saved by Ian McLoughlin. Ten-man County made them pay four minutes later as Robbie Willmott's free kick was headed over Josh Lillis by Kevin Feely to seal a 2–1 victory and a happy end to County's 2013–14 campaign.

=== Results summary ===
Overall								Home						Away					
Pld	W	D	L	GF	GA	GD	Pts	W	D	L	GF	GA	GD	W	D	L	GF	GA	GD
46	14	16	16	56	59	−3	58	10	6	7	37	27	+10	4	10	9	19	32	−13

Last updated: 3 May 2014.

=== Results by round ===
Round	1	2	3	4	5	6	7	8	9	10	11	12	13	14	15	16	17	18	19	20	21	22	23	24	25	26	27	28	29	30	31	32	33	34	35	36	37	38	39	40	41	42	43	44	45	46
Ground	H	A	H	A	A	H	H	A	H	A	A	H	A	H	A	H	A	A	H	A	A	A	H	H	A	A	A	H	H	H	H	H	A	A	H	H	A	H	H	A	H	H	A	H	A	H
Result	W	L	W	D	D	D	L	W	W	D	L	W	D	W	L	W	D	D	W	W	W	L	L	D	L	D	L	W	L	L	D	D	L	L	D	L	W	D	L	D	L	W	D	D	L	W
Position	1	10	7	6	8	9	12	11	8	9	12	10	9	7	10	4	6	8	8	4	5	7	8	8	8	8	10	8	8	9	11	10	11	13	14	14	12	12	15	14	14	13	13	15	15	14

Updated to match(es) played on 3 May 2014. Source: bbc.co.uk
A = Away; H = Home; W = Win; D = Draw; L = Loss

== Squad statistics ==
(Substitute appearances in brackets)

No.	Pos.	Name	League		FA Cup		League Cup		Other		Total	
No.	Pos.	Name	Apps	Goals	Apps	Goals	Apps	Goals	Apps	Goals	Apps	Goals
21	DF	(Wales) Byron Anthony	7 (0)	0	0 (0)	0	1 (0)	0	0 (0)	0	8 (0)	0
24	FW	(England) George Barker	0 (2)	0	0 (0)	0	0 (0)	0	0 (0)	0	0 (2)	0
	GK	(England) James Bittner	0 (0)	0	0 (0)	0	0 (0)	0	0 (0)	0	0 (0)	0
16	DF	(Wales) Darcy Blake	8 (0)	0	0 (0)	0	0 (0)	0	0 (0)	0	8 (0)	0
15	MF	(England) Ryan Burge	12 (5)	2	0 (0)	0	0 (0)	0	0 (0)	0	15 (5)	2
7	DF	(Northern Ireland) Adam Chapman	35 (4)	2	3 (0)	0	2 (0)	0	1 (1)	1	41 (5)	3
9	FW	(England) Danny Crow	13 (14)	3	3 (0)	0	1 (1)	2	2 (1)	0	19 (16)	5
20	DF	(Republic of Ireland) Kevin Feely	10 (0)	1	0 (0)	0	0 (0)	0	0 (0)	0	10 (0)	1
17	MF	(Wales) Michael Flynn	18 (14)	3	1 (2)	0	0 (1)	0	2 (1)	0	21 (18)	3
24	DF	(Wales) Aaron Amadi-Holloway	0 (4)	0	0 (0)	0	0 (0)	0	0 (0)	0	0 (4)	0
45	FW	(England) Rene Howe	12 (3)	3	0 (0)	0	0 (0)	0	0 (0)	0	12 (3)	3
3	DF	(Wales) Andrew Hughes	23 (3)	2	1 (0)	0	1 (1)	0	2 (0)	0	27 (4)	2
18	DF	(England) Ryan Jackson	26 (3)	0	2 (1)	0	2 (0)	0	1 (1)	0	31 (5)	0
5	DF	(Wales) Tony James	5 (1)	0	0 (0)	0	0 (1)	0	1 (0)	0	6 (2)	0
14	FW	(England) Shaun Jeffers	4 (10)	0	0 (0)	0	0 (0)	0	0 (0)	0	4 (10)	0
23	FW	(England) Christian Jolley	20 (12)	2	2 (1)	0	1 (0)	0	2 (0)	0	25 (13)	2
16	DF	(England) Billy Jones	6 (1)	1	1 (0)	0	0 (0)	0	0 (0)	0	7 (1)	1
33	GK	(Republic of Ireland) Ian McLoughlin	12 (0)	0	0 (0)	0	0 (0)	0	0 (0)	0	12 (0)	0
8	MF	(England) Lee Minshull	34 (6)	4	1 (1)	0	2 (0)	0	1 (1)	0	38 (8)	4
19	DF	(England) Tom Naylor	24 (9)	1	3 (0)	1	1 (0)	0	3 (0)	0	31 (9)	2
10	FW	(England) Aaron O'Connor	1 (3)	1	0 (0)	0	0 (0)	0	0 (0)	0	1 (3)	1
20	DF	(England) Adedeji Oshilaja	8 (0)	0	2 (0)	0	0 (0)	0	2 (0)	1	12 (0)	1
29	GK	(England) Elliot Parish	7 (0)	0	0 (0)	0	0 (0)	0	0 (0)	0	7 (0)	0
27	FW	(England) Joe Parker	0 (0)	0	0 (0)	0	0 (0)	0	0 (0)	0	0 (0)	0
1	GK	(England) Lenny Pidgeley	25 (0)	0	3 (0)	0	1 (0)	0	0 (1)	0	29 (1)	0
2	DF	(Wales) David Pipe	22 (3)	0	1 (0)	0	0 (0)	0	2 (1)	0	25 (4)	0
4	MF	(England) Max Porter	15 (7)	1	0 (0)	0	0 (0)	0	0 (0)	0	15 (7)	1
26	DF	(Wales) Ellis Redman	0 (0)	0	0 (0)	0	0 (0)	0	0 (0)	0	0 (0)	0
13	DF	(England) Andy Sandell	21 (2)	3	0 (1)	0	2 (0)	0	1 (0)	0	24 (3)	3
25	GK	(England) Jamie Stephens	2 (0)	0	0 (0)	0	1 (0)	0	3 (0)	0	6 (0)	0
	GK	(England) Conor Thompson	0 (0)	0	0 (0)	0	0 (0)	0	0 (0)	0	0 (0)	0
14	FW	(Northern Ireland) Conor Washington	16 (8)	4	2 (1)	0	1 (1)	1	2 (1)	2	21 (11)	7
12	FW	(England) Robbie Willmott	40 (6)	3	2 (0)	3	2 (0)	0	3 (0)	0	47 (6)	6
22	DF	(England) Harry Worley	26 (0)	4	3 (0)	0	2 (0)	0	2 (0)	0	33 (0)	4
6	DF	(England) Ismail Yakubu	22 (3)	3	2 (0)	0	1 (0)	0	2 (0)	0	27 (3)	3
11	FW	(England) Chris Zebroski	32 (3)	12	1 (0)	0	1 (1)	0	1 (0)	1	35 (4)	13

=== Transfers ===
==== In ====
Date	Pos.	Name	From	Fee
5 June 2013	MF	(Northern Ireland) Adam Chapman	Oxford United	Undisclosed
5 June 2013	FW	(England) Chris Zebroski	Eastleigh	Free
20 June 2013	DF	(England) Harry Worley	Oxford United	Free
9 July 2013	GK	(England) Jamie Stephens	Liverpool	Free
2 August 2013	DF	(England) Ryan Jackson	Macclesfield Town	Compensation
27 July 2013	GK	(England) James Bittner	Unattached	Free
30 August 2013	MF	(England) Ryan Burge	Unattached	Free
12 September 2013	DF	(England) Billy Jones	Unattached	Free
20 November 2013	FW	(England) Joe Parker	Gloucester City	Free
9 January 2014	FW	(England) Rene Howe	Unattached	Free
28 January 2014	FW	(England) Shaun Jeffers	Peterborough United	Undisclosed
6 February 2014	GK	(Northern Ireland) Conor Thompson	Unattached	Free
13 February 2014	FW	(Wales) Aaron Amadi-Holloway	Unattached	Free
21 March 2014	DF	(Wales) Darcy Blake	Unattached	Free

==== Out ====
Date	Pos.	Name	To	Fee
9 July 2013	FW	(Wales) Rhys Griffiths	Released	
30 August 2013	GK	(England) James Bittner	Released	
10 January 2014	DF	(England) Billy Jones	Released	
28 January 2014	FW	(Northern Ireland) Conor Washington	Peterborough United	Undisclosed
6 March 2014	GK	(Northern Ireland) Conor Thompson	Released	
24 April 2014	DF	(Wales) David Pipe	Released	
5 May 2014	DF	(Wales) Tony James	Retired	
5 May 2014	FW	(Wales) Aaron Amadi-Holloway	Released	
5 May 2014	DF	(England) Harry Worley	Released	
5 May 2014	MF	(England) Ryan Burge	Released	
5 May 2014	DF	(Wales) Darcy Blake	Released	

==== Loans in ====
Date	Pos.	Name	From	Expiry
12 August 2013	DF	(England) Tom Naylor	Derby County	End of season
31 October 2013	DF	(England) Deji Oshilaja	Cardiff City	January 2014
22 November 2013	FW	(England) George Barker	Brighton & Hove Albion	January 2014
10 February 2014	GK	(England) Elliot Parish	Bristol City	March 2014
11 March 2014	GK	(Republic of Ireland) Ian McLoughlin	Milton Keynes Dons	End of season
21 March 2014	DF	(Republic of Ireland) Kevin Feely	Charlton Athletic	End of season

==== Loans out ====
Date	Pos.	Name	To	Expiry
20 November 2013	FW	(England) Joe Parker	Gloucester City	June 2014

== Fixtures and results ==
=== Pre-season friendlies ===
Date	Opponents	Venue	Result	Scorers	Attendance	Notes
Wed 10 Jul 2013	Swindon Supermarine	Webb's Wood Stadium	2–1	Washington 33' Jolley 63'	c. 250	
Sat 13 Jul 2013	Carl Zeiss Jena	Wimaria-Stadion, Weimar	2–2	Anthony 31' O'Connor 90'	c. 2,800	110th anniversary match
Tue 16 Jul 2013	Taunton Town	Wordsworth Drive	6–0	O'Connor 1', 17', 39' Jolley 31' Sandell 80' (pen.) Crow 86'	279	
Sat 20 Jul 2013	Havant & Waterlooville	West Leigh Park	3–0	Minshull 34' Sandell 61' Pipe 83'	312	
Tue 23 Jul 2013	Reading XI	Newport Stadium	3–3	Zebroski 7', 26' Minshull 90'	765	Tony Gilbert testimonial
Thu 25 Jul 2013	Pegasus Juniors	Old School Lane	2–0	Washington 46', 70' (pen.)		Newport County XI
Sun 28 Jul 2013	Aston Villa XI	Rodney Parade	5–2	Jolley 30' 68' Hughes 54' Minshull 59' 80'	2,984	

=== League Two ===
3 August 2013 1	Newport County	4–1	Accrington Stanley	Newport
15:00 BST (UTC+1)	Worley 24'; Zebroski 43', 66'; Jolley 55'	Report; Report; Report	Webber 68'	Stadium: Rodney Parade; Attendance: 4,631; Referee: Darren Drysdale

10 August 2013 2	Northampton Town	3–1	Newport County	Northampton
15:00 BST (UTC+1)	Blyth 25'; O'Donovan 27'; Deegan 84'	Report; Report; Report	Washington 89'	Stadium: Sixfields Stadium; Attendance: 4,319; Referee: Mark Heywood

17 August 2013 3	Newport County	1–0	Bristol Rovers	Newport
15:00 BST (UTC+1)	Sandell 42' (pen.)	Report; Report; Report		Stadium: Rodney Parade; Attendance: 5,387; Referee: Lee Collins

24 August 2013 4	Dagenham & Redbridge	1–1	Newport County	Dagenham
15:00 BST (UTC+1)	Ogogo 59'	Report; Report; Report	Zebroski 25'	Stadium: Victoria Road; Attendance: 1,564; Referee: Tim Robinson

31 August 2013 5	Scunthorpe United	1–1	Newport County	Scunthorpe
15:00 BST (UTC+1)	Winnall 2'	Report; Report; Report	Hughes 62'	Stadium: Glanford Park; Attendance: 3,157; Referee: Graham Horwood

7 September 2013 6	Newport County	1–1	Mansfield Town	Newport
15:00 BST (UTC+1)	Zebroski 30'	Report; Report; Report	Clucas 67'	Stadium: Rodney Parade; Attendance: 3,709; Referee: Phillips

14 September 2013 7	Newport County	2–3	Morecambe	Newport
15:00 BST (UTC+1)	Jones 3'; Flynn 24'	Report; Report; Report	Naylor 12', 57' (o.g.); Amond 71' (pen.)	Stadium: Rodney Parade; Attendance: 3,165; Referee: Sarginson

21 September 2013 8	Exeter City	0–2	Newport County	Exeter
15:00 BST (UTC+1)		Report; Report; Report	Washington 23'; Worley 70'	Stadium: St James Park; Attendance: 4,614; Referee: Bond

28 September 2013 9	Newport County	2–1	Torquay United	Newport
15:00 BST (UTC+1)	Yakubu 28'; Crow 36'	Report; Report; Report	Azeez 58'	Stadium: Rodney Parade; Attendance: 3,557; Referee: Iain Williamson

5 October 2013 10	Bury	0–0	Newport County	Bury
15:00 BST (UTC+1)		Report; Report; Report		Stadium: Gigg Lane; Attendance: 3,093; Referee: Richard Clark

12 October 2013 11	Rochdale	3–0	Newport County	Rochdale
15:00 BST (UTC+1)	Vincenti 5'; Cummins 38'; Hery 72'	Report; Report; Report		Stadium: Spotland Stadium; Attendance: 2,530; Referee: Steven Rushton

19 October 2013 12	Newport County	3–0	York City	Newport
15:00 BST (UTC+1)	Zebroski 23'; Minshull 44'; Crow 89'	Report; Report; Report		Stadium: Rodney Parade; Attendance: 3,475; Referee: Graham Salisbury

22 October 2013 13	Plymouth Argyle	0–0	Newport County	Plymouth
19:45 BST (UTC+1)		Report; Report; Report		Stadium: Home Park; Attendance: 5,689; Referee: Oliver Langford

26 October 2013 14	Newport County	3–1	Southend United	Newport
15:00 BST (UTC+1)	Washington 23'; Hughes 45+1'; Yakubu 53'	Report; Report; Report	Coker 41'	Stadium: Rodney Parade; Attendance: 3,652; Referee: Lee Collins

2 November 2013 15	Fleetwood Town	4–1	Newport County	Fleetwood
15:00 GMT	Schumacher 4' (pen.), 48', 59' (pen.); Ball 78'	Report; Report; Report	Zebroski 71' (pen.)	Stadium: Highbury Stadium; Attendance: 2,354; Referee: Andy Haines

15 November 2013 16	Newport County	2–0	Hartlepool United	Newport
19:45 GMT	Worley 7'; Washington 64'	Report; Report; Report		Stadium: Rodney Parade; Attendance: 3,094; Referee: Stephen Martin

23 November 2013 17	Cheltenham Town	0–0	Newport County	Cheltenham
15:00 GMT		Report; Report; Report		Stadium: Whaddon Road; Attendance: 3,501; Referee: Andy Madley

26 November 2013 18	Oxford United	0–0	Newport County	Oxford
19:45 GMT		Report; Report; Report		Stadium: Kassam Stadium; Attendance: 5,042; Referee: Darren Sheldrake

1 December 2013 19	Newport County	3–2	Chesterfield	Newport
13:00 GMT	Crow 6'; Chapman 75' (pen.); Sandell 87'	Report; Report; Report	Ryan 62'; Richards 90+1'	Stadium: Rodney Parade; Attendance: 3,378; Referee: Mark Heywood

14 December 2013 20	Portsmouth	0–2	Newport County	Portsmouth
15:00 GMT		Report; Report; Report	Flynn 65', 68'	Stadium: Fratton Park; Attendance: 15,295; Referee: Darren Deadman

26 December 2013 21	Wycombe Wanderers	0–1	Newport County	High Wycombe
12:30 GMT		Report; Report; Report	Flynn 31'	Stadium: Adams Park; Attendance: 3,513; Referee: Iain Williamson

29 December 2013 22	Burton Albion	1–0	Newport County	Burton upon Trent
15:00 GMT		Report; Report; Report	Kee 79'	Stadium: Pirelli Stadium; Attendance: 2,692; Referee: Geoff Eltringham

4 January 2014 23	Newport County	1–2	Northampton Town	Newport
15:00 GMT	Worley 45'	Report; Report; Report	Hope 29'; Carter 47'	Stadium: Rodney Parade; Attendance: 3,864; Referee: Frederick Graham

11 January 2014 24	Accrington Stanley	3–3	Newport County	Accrington
15:00 GMT	Murphy 23', 88'; Naismith 44'	Report; Report; Report	Willmott 11'; Burge 71'; Minshull 90+2'	Stadium: Crown Ground; Attendance: 1,318; Referee: Dean Whitestone

25 January 2014 25	Bristol Rovers	3–1	Newport County	Bristol
15:00 GMT	Mohamed 45'; Richards 48'; O'Toole 90'	Report; Report; Report	Howe 57'	Stadium: Memorial Stadium; Attendance: 7,288; Referee: Jeremy Simpson

31 January 2014 26	Southend United	0–0	Newport County	Southend-on-Sea
19:45 GMT		Report; Report; Report		Stadium: Roots Hall; Attendance: 5,993; Referee: James Linington

15 February 2014 27	Hartlepool United	3–0	Newport County	Hartlepool
15:00 GMT	James 41'; Sandell (og) 55'; Williams 90'	Report; Report; Report		Stadium: Victoria Park; Attendance: 3,470; Referee: Trevor Kettle

18 February 2014 28	Newport County	3–2	Oxford United	Newport
19:45 GMT	Howe 45'; Burge 71'; Zebroski 83'	Report; Report; Report	Constable 14'; Potter 88'	Stadium: Rodney Parade; Attendance: 3,757; Referee: Oliver Langford

22 February 2014 29	Newport County	0–1	Cheltenham Town	Newport
15:00 GMT		Report; Report; Report	Vincent 23'	Stadium: Rodney Parade; Attendance: 3,130; Referee: Steven Rushton

25 February 2014 30	Newport County	1–2	AFC Wimbledon	Newport
19:45 GMT	Worner (og) 23'	Report; Report; Report	Sheringham 85'; Sainte-Luce 88'	Stadium: Rodney Parade; Attendance: 2,666; Referee: Tim Robinson

1 March 2014 31	Newport County	2–2	Scunthorpe United	Newport
15:00 GMT	Minshull 25'; Zebroski 91'	Report; Report; Report	Madden 61'; Syers 83'	Stadium: Rodney Parade; Attendance: 2,782; Referee: Carl Berry

4 March 2014 32	Newport County	0–0	Fleetwood Town	Newport
19:45 GMT		Report; Report; Report		Stadium: Rodney Parade; Attendance: 3,728; Referee: Geoff Eltringham

8 March 2014 33	Mansfield Town	2–1	Newport County	Mansfield
15:00 GMT	Tafazolli 28'; Howell 90'	Report; Report; Report	Howe 50'	Stadium: One Call Stadium; Attendance: 2,756; Referee: Andy Davies

11 March 2014 34	Morecambe	4–1	Newport County	Morecambe
19:45 GMT	Devitt 57' (pen.); Ellison 61'; Redshaw 72', 83'	Report; Report; Report; Report	Naylor 13'	Stadium: Globe Arena; Attendance: 1,300; Referee: Richard Clark

16 March 2014 35	Newport County	1–1	Exeter City	Newport
15:00 GMT	Minshull 52'	Report; Report; Report	Worley (og) 51'	Stadium: Rodney Parade; Attendance: 3,159; Referee: Carl Boyeson

19 March 2014 36	Newport County	1–2	Dagenham & Redbridge	Newport
19:45 GMT	Wilmott 45'	Report; Report; Report	Elito 10', 33'	Stadium: Rodney Parade; Attendance: 2,360; Referee: Charles Breakspear

22 March 2014 37	Torquay United	0–1	Newport County	Torquay
15:00 GMT		Report; Report; Report	Zebroski 8'	Stadium: Plainmoor; Attendance: 2,874; Referee: Gary Sutton

25 March 2014 38	Newport County	0–0	Bury	Newport
19:45 GMT		Report; Report; Report		Stadium: Rodney Parade; Attendance: 2,160; Referee: Chris Sarginson

29 March 2014 39	Newport County	1–2	Portsmouth	Newport
15:00 GMT	Yakubu 74'	Report; Report; Report; Report	Taylor 22' (pen.); Wallace 40'	Stadium: Rodney Parade; Attendance: 4,261; Referee: Steve Bratt

5 April 2014 40	Chesterfield	1–1	Newport County	Chesterfield
15:00 BST	Ryan 49'	Report; Report; Report	Porter 83'	Stadium: Proact Stadium; Attendance: 5,659; Referee: Simon Hooper

8 April 2014 41	Newport County	1–2	Plymouth Argyle	Newport
19:45 BST	Zebroski 27'	Report; Report; Report	Harvey 21'; Hourihane 30'	Stadium: Rodney Parade; Attendance: Scott Mathieson; Referee: 3,381

12 April 2014 42	Newport County	2–0	Wycombe Wanderers	Newport
15:00 BST	Jolley 68'; Zebroski 73'	Report; Report; Report		Stadium: Rodney Parade; Attendance: 2,838; Referee: Stuart Atwell

18 April 2014 43	AFC Wimbledon	2–2	Newport County	Kingston upon Thames
15:00 BST	Appiah 49'; Francomb 69'	Report; Report; Report report	Zebroski 15'; Flynn 47' (pen.)	Stadium: Kingsmeadow; Attendance: 4,398; Referee: Andy Woolmer

21 April 2014 44	Newport County	1–1	Burton Albion	Newport
15:00 BST	Sandell 5'	Report; Report; Report; Report	Symes 36' (pen.)	Stadium: Rodney Parade; Attendance: 2,630; Referee: Brendan Malone

26 April 2014 45	York City	1–0	Newport County	York
15:00 BST	Coulson 77'	Report; Report; Report		Stadium: Bootham Crescent; Attendance: 4,531; Referee: Jeremy Simpson

3 May 2014 46	Newport County	2–1	Rochdale	Newport
15:00 BST	O'Connor 41'; Feely 88'	Report; Report; Report; Report	Donnelly 28'	Stadium: Rodney Parade; Attendance: 4,662; Referee: James Adcock

=== Football League Cup ===
6 August 2013 Round 1	Brighton & Hove Albion	1–3 (a.e.t.)	Newport County	Brighton
19:45 BST (UTC+1)	Barnes 18'	Report; Report; Report	Crow 81', 94'; Washington 103'	Stadium: Falmer Stadium; Attendance: 8,409; Referee: Malone

27 August 2013 Round 2	West Bromwich Albion	3–0	Newport County	West Bromwich
20:00 BST	Berahino 7', 26', 38' (pen.)	Report; Report; Report		Stadium: The Hawthorns; Attendance: 8,955; Referee: Andy D'Urso

=== Football League Trophy ===
8 October 2013 Round 2	Crawley Town	2–3	Newport County	Crawley
19:00 BST (UTC+1)	Sinclair 13'; Jones 23'	Report; Report; Report	Zebroski 43'; Chapman 48' (pen.); Essam 61' (o.g.)	Stadium: Checkatrade.com Stadium; Attendance: 1,306; Referee: Rob Lewis replaced by Andy Laver 20'

12 November 2013 Southern Area; Quarter-finals	Newport County	3–0	Portsmouth	Newport
19:45 GMT	Washington 5', 83'; Oshilaja 19'	Report; Report; Report		Stadium: Rodney Parade; Attendance: 2,849; Referee: Graham Scott

10 December 2013 Southern Area; Semi-finals	Newport County	0–3	Peterborough United	Newport
19:45 GMT		Report; Report; Report	Ntlhe 13'; McCann 90+1'; Mendez-Laing 90+5'	Stadium: Rodney Parade; Attendance: 1,765; Referee: Trevor Kettle

=== FA Cup ===
9 November 2013 1st Round	Braintree Town	1–1	Newport County	Braintree
15:00 GMT	Isaac 9'	Report; Report; Report	Naylor 50'	Stadium: Cressing Road; Referee: Graham Horwood

19 November 2013 1st Round; Replay	Newport County	1–0	Braintree Town	Newport
19:45 GMT	Willmott 45'	Report; Report; Report		Stadium: Rodney Parade; Attendance: 1,406; Referee: Andy Davies

7 December 2013 2nd Round	Kidderminster Harriers	4–2	Newport County	Kidderminster
15:00 GMT	Gash 19', 63'; Gittings 28', 43'	Report; Report; Report	Willmott 79', 83'	Stadium: Aggborough Stadium; Attendance: 2,636; Referee: Mark Heywood

== League table ==
Pos	Team	Pld	W	D	L	GF	GA	GD	Pts
12	Bury	46	13	20	13	59	51	+8	59
13	Portsmouth	46	14	17	15	56	66	−10	59
14	Newport County	46	14	16	16	56	59	−3	58
15	Accrington Stanley	46	14	15	17	54	56	−2	57
16	Exeter City	46	14	13	19	54	57	−3	55

Updated to match(es) played on 3 May 2014. Source: BBC Sport
Rules for classification: 1) Points; 2) Goal difference; 3) Number of goals scored
