= Maecky Ngombo =

Belgian footballer (born 1995)

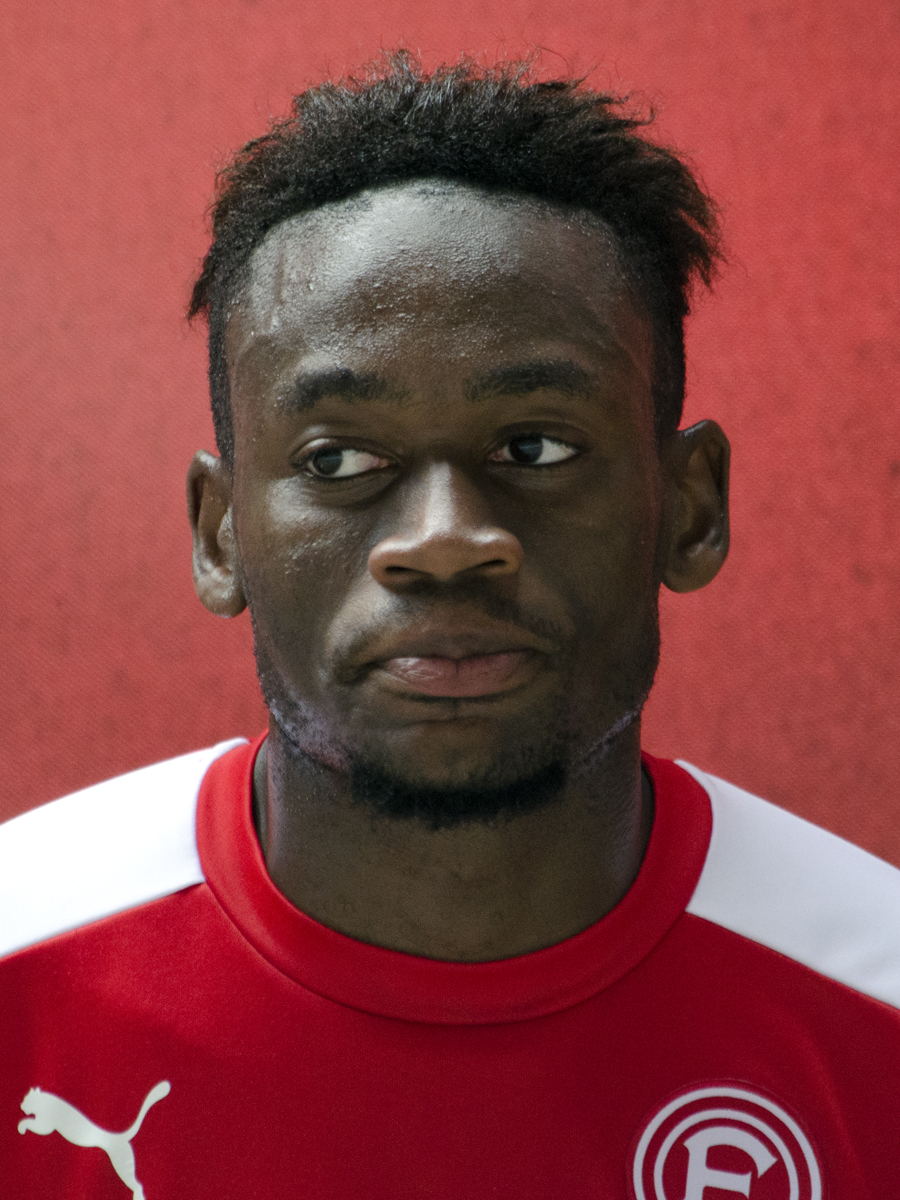
- Ngombo with Fortuna Düsseldorf in 2016

Personal information
- Full name: Maecky Fred Ngombo Sansoni
- Date of birth: 31 March 1995 (age 31)
- Place of birth: Liège, Belgium
- Height: 1.91 m (6 ft 3 in)
- Position: Forward

Team information
- Current team: Stade Verviétois
- Number: 14

Youth career
- 2008–2014: Standard Liège
- 2014–2015: Roda JC

Senior career*
Years	Team	Apps	(Gls)
2015–2016	Roda JC	17	(4)
2016	Fortuna Düsseldorf	6	(0)
2016	→ Fortuna Düsseldorf II	1	(0)
2017	→ Milton Keynes Dons (loan)	9	(0)
2018	Roda JC	12	(1)
2018–2019	Ascoli	13	(2)
2019–2021	Go Ahead Eagles	12	(2)
2020–2021	CR Belouizdad	6	(0)
2021	Botoșani		
2022	Houtvenne	9	(0)
2022–2023	ACR Messina	3	(0)
2024–	Stade Verviétois	6	(2)

International career
2016	Belgium U21	1	(0)
- * Club domestic league appearances and goals as of 21 January 2026

Maecky Fred Ngombo Sansoni, known as Maecky Ngombo (born 31 March 1995) is a Belgian professional footballer who plays as a forward for Stade Verviétois.

== Club career ==
=== Roda JC ===
Ngombo joined Roda JC Kerkrade in 2015. He made his debut for Roda on 20 December 2015 against Willem II Tilburg. Overall, he scored 4 goals in 17 matches for the club.

=== Fortuna Düsseldorf ===
Ngombo moved to Fortuna Düsseldorf in 2016. On 31 August 2017, at the beginning of the 2017–18, season, Düsseldorf agreed to terminate his contract.

==== Loan to MK Dons ====
On 30 January 2017, Ngombo joined English League One side MK Dons on loan until the end of the 2016–17 season.

=== Return to Roda JC ===
In January 2018, Ngombo returned to former club Roda JC Kerkrade on a six-month contract having previously trialled with the club in October 2017.

=== Go Ahead Eagles ===
On 29 August 2019, he signed a contract with Dutch club Go Ahead Eagles for a term of one year with an additional one-year extension option.

=== Messina ===
On 2 December 2022, Ngombo signed with ACR Messina in the Italian third-tier Serie C.

== International career ==
Born in Belgium and of Congolese descent. Ngombo is a Belgian youth international.

== Career statistics ==
As of 30 April 2017

Club	Season	League			Cup (Note: Includes DFB-Pokal and KNVB Cup.)		Other		Total	
Club	Season	Division	Apps	Goals	Apps	Goals	Apps	Goals	Apps	Goals
Roda JC Kerkrade	2015–16	Eredivisie	17	4	1	1	—		18	5
Roda JC Kerkrade	Total		17	4	1	1	—		18	5
Fortuna Düsseldorf	2016–17	2. Bundesliga	6	0	1	0	—		7	0
Fortuna Düsseldorf	Total		6	0	1	0	—		7	0
Milton Keynes Dons (loan)	2016–17	League One	9	0	—		—		9	0
Milton Keynes Dons (loan)	Total		9	0	—		—		9	0
Career total			32	4	2	1	—		34	5

== Honours ==
=== Club ===
CR Belouizdad

Algerian Ligue Professionnelle

- Algerian Super Cup (1): 2020
