= 2013–14 Milton Keynes Dons F.C. season =

Milton Keynes Dons F.C.
2013–14 season
- Chairman: Pete Winkelman
- Manager: Karl Robinson
- Stadium: Stadium mk
- League One: 10th
- FA Cup: Third round
- League Cup: Second round
- League Trophy: Second round
- Top goalscorer: League: Patrick Bamford (14); All: Patrick Bamford (17)
- Highest home attendance: 20,516 (vs Wolverhampton Wanderers); 29 March 2014, League One
- Lowest home attendance: 4,049 (vs FC Halifax Town); 9 November 2013, FA Cup R1
- Average home league attendance: 9,047
- Biggest win: 4–1 (vs Stevenage); 28 September 2013, League One; 4–1 (vs FC Halifax Town); 9 November 2013, FA Cup R1
- Biggest defeat: 4–2 (vs Sunderland); 27 August 2013, League Cup R2
Home colours	Away colours	Third colours

The 2013–14 season was Milton Keynes Dons' tenth season in their existence as a professional association football club, and their sixth consecutive season competing in League One. As well as competing in League One, the club also competed in the FA Cup, League Cup and League Trophy.

The season covers the period from 1 July 2013 to 30 June 2014.

== Competitions ==
=== League One ===
Final table

Pos	Team	Pld	W	D	L	GF	GA	GD	Pts
8	Swindon Town	46	19	9	18	63	59	+4	66
9	Port Vale	46	18	7	21	59	73	–14	61
10	Milton Keynes Dons	46	17	9	20	63	65	–2	60
11	Bradford City	46	14	17	15	57	54	+3	59
12	Bristol City	46	13	19	14	70	67	+3	58

Source: Sky Sports

Matches

Win	Draw	Loss

Date	Opponent	Venue	Result	Scorers	Attendance	Ref
3 August 2013 – 15:00	Shrewsbury Town	Away	0–0		5,144	
10 August 2013 – 15:00	Crewe Alexandra	Home	1–0	Bamford	6,911	
17 August 2013 – 15:00	Preston North End	Away	2–2	Banton, Williams	9,944	
24 August 2013 – 15:00	Bristol City	Home	2–2	Bamford, Carruthers	7,874	
31 August 2013 – 15:00	Sheffield United	Away	1–0	Kay	15,080	
7 September 2013 – 15:00	Swindon Town	Home	1–1	Bamford	7,738	
14 September 2013 – 15:00	Notts County	Home	3–1	Chadwick, Williams, Bamford	7,142	
21 September 2013 – 15:00	Peterborough United	Away	1–2	McLeod	8,149	
28 September 2013 – 15:00	Stevenage	Home	4–1	Bamford (2), Alli, Williams	7,770	
5 October 2013 – 15:00	Gillingham	Away	2–3	Bamford (2)	11,280	
12 October 2013 – 15:00	Leyton Orient	Away	1–2	Bamford	6,359	
19 October 2013 – 15:00	Rotherham United	Home	3–2	Williams, Reeves, Bamford	11,564	
22 October 2013 – 19:45	Carlisle United	Home	0–1		6,675	
26 October 2013 – 15:00	Tranmere Rovers	Away	2–3	Powell, Banton	4,100	
2 November 2013 – 15:00	Walsall	Home	1–0	Williams	7,711	
23 November 2013 – 15:00	Bradford City	Home	2–3	Bamford, Williams	8,970	
26 November 2013 – 19:45	Colchester United	Away	1–3	Spence	2,597	
30 November 2013 – 15:00	Coventry City	Home	1–3	Williams	14,988	
14 December 2013 – 15:00	Wolverhampton Wanderers	Away	2–0	Bamford, Reeves	17,142	
21 December 2013 – 15:00	Port Vale	Home	3–0	Gleeson, Reeves, Bamford	7,882	
26 December 2013 – 15:00	Crawley Town	Away	2–0	Gleeson, Bamford	3,249	
29 December 2013 – 15:00	Brentford	Away	1–3	Hodson	8,010	
1 January 2014 – 15:00	Colchester United	Home	0–0		7,879	
11 January 2014 – 15:00	Shrewsbury Town	Home	3–2	Alli, Long, Bowditch	7,408	
18 January 2014 – 15:00	Bristol City	Away	2–2	Williams, Reeves	11,533	
21 January 2014 – 19:45	Crewe Alexandra	Away	0–2		3,613	
28 January 2014 – 19:45	Carlisle United	Away	0–3		3,007	
1 February 2014 – 15:00	Tranmere Rovers	Home	0–1		7,460	
8 February 2014 – 15:00	Walsall	Away	3–0	McLeod (2), Reeves	4,116	
15 February 2014 – 15:00	Oldham Athletic	Home	2–1	Carruthers, Reeves	7,385	
18 February 2014 – 19:45	Preston North End	Home	0–0		7,279	
22 February 2014 – 15:00	Bradford City	Away	0–1		13,501	
25 February 2014 – 19:45	Oldham Athletic	Away	2–1	G. Baldock, McLeod	2,792	
1 March 2014 – 15:00	Sheffield United	Home	0–1		9,192	
8 March 2014 – 15:00	Swindon Town	Away	2–1	Kay, G. Baldock	7,424	
11 March 2014 – 19:45	Notts County	Away	3–1	Alli (3)	3,331	
15 March 2014 – 15:00	Peterborough United	Home	0–2		9,590	
22 March 2014 – 15:00	Stevenage	Away	3–2	Spence, Reeves, Lewington	3,027	
25 March 2014 – 19:45	Gillingham	Home	0–1		6,760	
29 March 2014 – 15:00	Wolverhampton Wanderers	Home	0–1		20,516	
5 April 2014 – 15:00	Coventry City	Away	2–1	Alli, McLeod	2,781	
12 April 2014 – 15:00	Crawley Town	Home	0–2		8,877	
18 April 2014 – 15:00	Port Vale	Away	0–1		5,074	
21 April 2014 – 15:00	Brentford	Home	2–2	Gleeson, McLeod	10,549	
26 April 2014 – 15:00	Rotherham United	Away	2–2	Kennedy, McLeod	9,405	
3 May 2014 – 15:00	Leyton Orient	Home	1–3	Hall	9,965	

=== FA Cup ===
Matches

Win	Draw	Loss

Date	Round	Opponent	Venue	Result	Scorers	Attendance	Ref
9 November 2013 – 15:00	First round	FC Halifax Town	Home	4–1	McLeod (2), Williams, Galloway	4,126	
7 December 2013 – 15:00	Second round	Dover Athletic	Home	1–0	Reeves	4,060	
4 January 2014 – 15:00	Third round	Wigan Athletic	Away	3–3	Reeves (2), Bamford	6,960	
14 January 2014 – 19:45	Third round (replay)	Wigan Athletic	Home	1–3 (Note: After extra-time. Score 1–1 at the conclusion of 90 minutes.)	Chadwick	8,316	

=== League Cup ===
Matches

Win	Draw	Loss

Date	Round	Opponent	Venue	Result	Scorers	Attendance	Ref
6 August 2013 – 19:45	First round	Northampton Town	Away	2–1	Reeves, Banton	3,486	
27 August 2013 – 19:45	Second round	Sunderland	Away	2–4	Bamford, McLeod	18,992	

=== League Trophy ===
Matches

Win	Draw	Loss

Date	Round	Opponent	Venue	Result	Scorers	Attendance	Ref
3 September 2013 – 19:45	First round	Northampton Town	Away	2–0	Alli, Bamford	4,299	
8 October 2013 – 19:45	Second round	Stevenage	Away	1–2	Williams	1,456	

== Player details ==
Note: Players' ages as of the club's opening fixture of the 2013–14 season.

#	Name	Nationality	Position	Date of birth (age)	Signed from	Signed in	Transfer fee
Goalkeepers
1	David Martin	(England)	GK	22 January 1986 (aged 27)	(England) Liverpool	2010	Free
50	Charlie Burns	(England)	GK	27 May 1995 (aged 18)	Academy	2014	Trainee
Defenders
3	Dean Lewington	(England)	LB	18 May 1984 (aged 29)	(England) Wimbledon	2004	Free
4	Tom Flanagan	(Northern Ireland)	CB	21 October 1991 (aged 21)	Academy	2010	Trainee
5	Lee Hodson	(Northern Ireland)	RB	2 October 1991 (aged 21)	Free agent	2013	Free
18	George Baldock	(Greece)	RB	9 March 1993 (aged 20)	Academy	2009	Trainee
19	Brendan Galloway	(Zimbabwe)	CB	17 March 1996 (aged 17)	Academy	2011	Trainee
23	Jordan Spence	(England)	RB	24 May 1990 (aged 23)	(England) West Ham United	2014	Loan
24	Antony Kay	(England)	CB	21 October 1982 (aged 30)	(England) Huddersfield Town	2012	Free
Midfielders
6	Larnell Cole	(England)	RM	9 March 1993 (aged 20)	(England) Fulham	2014	Loan
7	Stephen Gleeson	(Republic of Ireland)	CM	3 August 1988 (aged 25)	(England) Wolverhampton Wanderers	2009	Undisclosed
8	Darren Potter	(Republic of Ireland)	DM	21 December 1984 (aged 28)	(England) Sheffield Wednesday	2011	Free
11	Alan Smith	(England)	CM	28 October 1980 (aged 32)	Free agent	2012	Free
12	Ben Reeves	(Northern Ireland)	AM	19 November 1991 (aged 21)	Free agent	2013	Free
14	Dele Alli	(England)	CM	11 April 1996 (aged 17)	Academy	2011	Trainee
15	Mark Randall	(England)	CM	28 September 1989 (aged 23)	Free agent	2014	Free
20	Giorgio Rasulo	(England)	CM	23 January 1997 (aged 16)	Academy	2012	Trainee
21	Ryan Hall	(England)	LM	4 January 1988 (aged 25)	Academy	2014	Trainee
49	Will Summerfield	(England)	CM	8 November 1995 (aged 17)	Academy	2014	Trainee
Forwards
9	Dean Bowditch	(England)	LW	15 June 1986 (aged 27)	(England) Yeovil Town	2011	Free
13	Izale McLeod	(England)	CF	15 October 1984 (aged 28)	Free agent	2013	Free
17	Daniel Powell	(England)	LW	12 March 1991 (aged 22)	Academy	2008	Trainee
26	James Loveridge	(Wales)	CF	16 April 1994 (aged 19)	(Wales) Swansea City	2014	Loan
27	Sanmi Odelusi	(England)	LW	11 June 1993 (aged 20)	(England) Bolton Wanderers	2014	Loan
27	Matty Kennedy	(Scotland)	LW	1 November 1994 (aged 18)	(England) Everton	2014	Loan
Out on loan
10	Luke Chadwick	(England)	AM	18 November 1980 (aged 32)	(England) Norwich City	2009	Free
16	Ian McLoughlin	(Republic of Ireland)	GK	9 August 1991 (aged 21)	(England) Ipswich Town	2011	Free
25	Harry Hickford	(England)	CB	23 June 1996 (aged 17)	Academy	2014	Trainee
Left club during season
6	Shaun Williams	(Republic of Ireland)	CB	19 October 1986 (aged 26)	Free agent	2011	Free
15	Patrick Bamford	(England)	CF	5 September 1993 (aged 19)	(England) Chelsea	2013	Loan
21	Jason Banton	(England)	RM	15 December 1993 (aged 19)	(England) Crystal Palace	2013	Loan
21	Chris Long	(England)	CF	25 February 1995 (aged 18)	(England) Everton	2014	Loan
22	Samir Carruthers	(Republic of Ireland)	AM	4 April 1993 (aged 20)	(England) Aston Villa	2013	Loan
23	Danny Green	(England)	RW	9 July 1988 (aged 25)	(England) Charlton Athletic	2013	Loan
21	Dale Jennings	(England)	LW	21 December 1992 (aged 20)	(England) Barnsley	2013	Loan

== Transfers ==
=== Transfers in ===
Date from	Position	Name	From	Fee	Ref.
5 July 2013	DF	(Northern Ireland) Lee Hodson	Watford	Free transfer (Note: Mutual contract termination.)	
14 July 2013	MF	(Northern Ireland) Ben Reeves	Free agent (Note: Previous club: Southampton.)	Free transfer	
4 February 2014	FW	(England) Ryan Hall	Free agent (Note: Previous club: Leeds United.)	Free transfer	
14 March 2014	MF	(England) Mark Randall	Free agent (Note: Previous club: Ascoli.)	Free transfer	

=== Transfers out ===
Date from	Position	Name	To	Fee	Ref.
1 July 2013	MF	(England) Ryan Lowe	Tranmere Rovers	Free transfer	
5 July 2013	DF	(Scotland) Gary MacKenzie	Blackpool	Undisclosed	
15 July 2013	DF	(England) Adam Chicksen	Brighton & Hove Albion	Compensation	
8 January 2014	DF	(England) Jon Otsemobor	Released (Note: Mutual contract termination.)		
27 January 2014	DF	(Republic of Ireland) Shaun Williams	Millwall	Undisclosed	

=== Loans in ===
Start date	Position	Name	From	End date	Ref.
1 July 2013	FW	(England) Patrick Bamford	Chelsea	January 2014	
17 July 2013	FW	(England) Jason Banton	Crystal Palace	5 January 2014	
10 August 2013	MF	(Republic of Ireland) Samir Carruthers	Aston Villa	3 April 2014 (Note: Extended. Originally until January 2014.)	
2 September 2013	MF	(England) Danny Green	Charlton Athletic	6 October 2013	
24 October 2013	DF	(England) Jordan Spence	West Ham United	January 2014 (Note: Extended. Originally until November 2013.)	
28 November 2013	FW	(England) Dale Jennings	Barnsley	5 January 2014	
7 January 2014	FW	(England) Chris Long	Everton	February 2014	
30 January 2014	DF	(England) Jordan Spence	West Ham United	End of season	
21 February 2014	FW	(England) Sanmi Odelusi	Bolton Wanderers	End of season (Note: Extended. Originally until March 2014.)	
25 February 2014	MF	(England) Larnell Cole	Fulham	End of season	
18 March 2014	FW	(Wales) James Loveridge	(Wales) Swansea City	End of season (Note: Extended. Originally until April 2014.)	
26 March 2014	FW	(Scotland) Matty Kennedy	Everton	End of season	

=== Loans out ===
Start date	Position	Name	To	End date	Ref.
28 November 2013	FW	(England) Izale McLeod	Northampton Town	26 December 2013 (Note: Recalled due to injury. Originally until 4 January 2014.)	
28 November 2013	DF	(England) Jon Otsemobor	Tranmere Rovers	14 December 2013 (Note: Recalled due to injury. Originally until 28 December 2013.)	
11 March 2014	GK	(Republic of Ireland) Ian McLoughlin	(Wales) Newport County	End of season (Note: Extended. Originally until 9 April 2014.)	
18 March 2014	MF	(England) Luke Chadwick	Cambridge United	End of season	
26 March 2014	DF	(Northern Ireland) Tom Flanagan	Stevenage	25 April 2014 (Note: Recalled. Originally until end of season.)	
27 March 2014	DF	(England) Harry Hickford	Chelmsford City	End of season	
