= Harry Worley =

English footballer

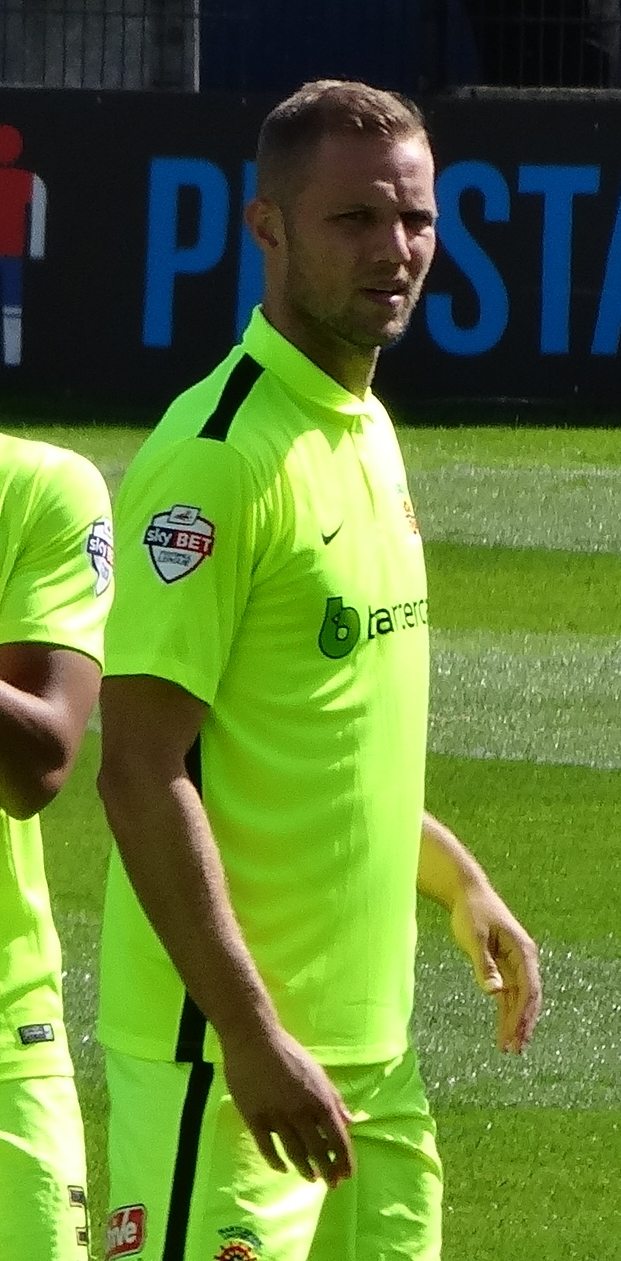
- Worley playing for Hartlepool United in 2015

Personal information
- Full name: Harry Jonathan Worley
- Date of birth: 25 November 1988 (age 37)
- Place of birth: Lymm, England
- Position: Defender

Youth career
- 2000–2005: Stockport County
- 2005–2006: Chelsea

Senior career*
Years	Team	Apps	(Gls)
2006–2008	Chelsea	0	(0)
2007	→ Doncaster Rovers (loan)	10	(0)
2007	→ Carlisle United (loan)	1	(0)
2008	→ Leicester City (loan)	2	(0)
2008–2010	Leicester City	0	(0)
2008	→ Luton Town (loan)	8	(0)
2009–2010	→ Crewe Alexandra (loan)	23	(1)
2010–2013	Oxford United	62	(2)
2013–2014	Newport County	26	(4)
2014–2015	Stevenage	3	(0)
2015–2016	Hartlepool United	3	(0)
2016	Salford City	2	(0)
Total		140	(7)
- * Club domestic league appearances and goals

Harry Jonathan Worley (born 25 November 1988) is an English former professional footballer who played as a defender.

== Career ==
=== Chelsea ===
Born in Lymm, Cheshire, Worley began his football career at Stockport County from age eleven and left the club at age sixteen when he was signed by Chelsea from Stockport County in the summer of 2005, with Chelsea beating many clubs to his signature. A tribunal set an initial transfer fee of £150,000 with further payments depending upon progress. He turned professional in November 2005 and in his first season made the most appearances at youth level.

He joined Doncaster Rovers on a month loan on 6 March 2007, making his debut in a vital 1–0 win at Nottingham Forest. He said at the time "I've come here to gain some experience and be part of a first team set up, I don't know what the future holds, although I still have another year on my contract at Chelsea." After extending his loan spell until the end of the season, Worley went on to make ten appearances for the club.

Worley was included in the squad for the 2007 FA Community Shield against Manchester United on 5 August 2007, at the new Wembley Stadium. He was an unused substitute as United won 3–0 on penalties. He joined Carlisle United on a one-month loan on 31 August 2007. He made his debut for the Cumbrians in a 1–0 victory over Cheltenham Town, the only game he would play for Carlisle.

=== Leicester City ===
Worley was given a trial by Leicester City on 6 February 2008, impressing in a reserve match. He then joined the club on loan until the end of the season, in the expectation of signing a signing a three-year contract the following summer. Worley made his league debut in a 3–0 defeat to Sheffield United on 5 April 2008, playing in the last game of the season in a 0–0 draw against Stoke City on 4 May as Leicester were relegated. His permanent move to Leicester became official on 5 May 2008.

On 18 September 2008, Worley joined Luton Town on loan for a month, making his debut in a 1–0 defeat to Rotherham on 20 September. The club managed to extend his loan for another month in October. He made a total of eight league appearances while Luton remained bottom of League Two before ending his loan spell in late-November.

On 14 August 2009, Worley again moved on loan, this time joining Crewe Alexandra until January 2010; after the signing, Crewe manager Gudjon Thordarson said he had wanted to make it a permanent deal but had to settle for a loan deal. Worley made his Crewe Alexandra debut the following day, where he made his first start and helped the club keep their first clean sheet of the season, in a 4–0 win over Grimsby Town. Then on 29 September 2009, Worley scored his first career league goal against Bury at Gresty Road. Despite the injury that kept him out for six weeks, Worley made his return to the first team on 26 December 2009, in a 4–1 loss against Macclesfield Town. Shortly after, Worley had his loan spell extended until the end of the season. Despite suffering from another injury, Worley went on to make twenty-three appearances for the club.

=== Oxford United ===
On 14 July 2010, Worley parted company with Leicester City by mutual consent, having failed to make more than a handful of first-team appearances during his two-year stint at the East Midlands club. He joined Oxford United on 22 July on a three-year deal after appearing on trial in two pre-season games against Scottish opposition.

Worley made his Oxford United debut, in the opening game of the season, making his first start and playing 90 minutes, as well as, keeping a clean sheet in a 0–0 draw against Burton Albion. Worley then provided assist for Jack Midson, who went on to score a hat-trick, in a 4–3 win over Torquay United on 3 January 2011. His first goal for Oxford United turned out to be the winner in a 2–1 away win against Port Vale at Vale Park on 12 March 2011. Despite missing three matches, due to suspension, Worley went on to make forty-three appearances and scoring once in his first season at Oxford United.

Worley made his first appearance of the 2011–12 season, where he came on as a late substitute for Paul McLaren, in a 1–0 win over Dagenham & Redbridge on 13 September 2011. However, Worley was soon on the sidelines for a month with ankle injury, which he sustained in training. Worley made his return from injury, where he made his first start of the season, in a 2–1 loss against Southend United on 5 November 2011. However, throughout the 2011–12 season, with eleven appearances in all competition, Worley spent most of the season on the substitute bench and lost his first team place by newly signing, Michael Duberry and his own injury concern.

However, in the pre-season friendly, Worley missed the whole pre-season friendly matches, due to recovering from ankle injury, which he sustained in April. On 29 September 2012, Worley Worley made his first team return, making his first start of the season, in a 3–1 loss against Rotherham United. Then on 9 October 2012, he scored his first Oxford United goal of the season, in a 4–2 win over Cheltenham Town in the second round of the Football League Trophy. After being absent for three matches in November, Worley then scored his first Oxford United league goal, in a 1–1 draw against Morecambe on 15 December 2012. Like the 2011–12 season, Worley made eleven appearances and scored two times in all competition, as he spent most of the season on the substitute bench, as well as, his own injury concern.

At the end of the 2012–13 season, Worley was among twelve players to be released by the club.

=== Newport County ===
On 22 June 2013, Worley joined Newport County, where he joined up with his teammates, Adam Chapman and Chris Zebroski. Upon joining the club, Worley stated he was motivated to join Newport County by Manager Justin Edinburgh.

Worley made his debut for Newport County in the opening League Two match of the 2013–14 season on 3 August 2013 versus Accrington Stanley. Worley scored the opening goal after 24 minutes in the 4–1 win, the first goal for Newport County since their return to the Football League after a 25-year absence. Worley then scored his second goal for the club on 21 September 2013, in a 2–0 win over Exeter City. However, Worley soon suffered a groin strain that kept him out throughout October. After making his first team return against Braintree Town on 9 November 2013, Worley scored in the next game on 15 November 2013, in a 2–0 win over Hartlepool United. His fourth goal soon came on 4 January 2014, in a 2–1 loss against Northampton Town. However, towards the end of the season, Worley suffered a setbacks when he suffered injuries and suspension.

After making thirty-three appearances and scoring four times in all competition, Worley was released by Newport County in May 2014 at the end of the 2013–14 season.

=== Stevenage ===
After leaving Newport County, Worley signed for Stevenage for the 2014–15 season.

Worley made his Stevenage debut, in the opening game of the season, where he made his first start and played 90 minutes, in a 1–0 win over Hartlepool United. Worley made two more appearances by August against Watford and Southend United. However, during the match against Southend United, Worley suffered an injury when he ruptured his anterior cruciate ligament that expected him to miss the remainder of the season.

By March, Worley made his return to the first team, but suffered a minor setback when he twisted his knee awkwardly and was set out for another three weeks. After making a recovery, Worley played his first match in eight months in a reserve match against Reading u21. Worley then made his first team return in nine months, as an unused substitute, in a 1–0 win over Portsmouth on 14 April 2015. Worley played his first team match in nine months, where he played 56 minutes, in a 2–0 loss against Luton Town in the last game of the season.

At the end of the 2014–15 season, Worley was among thirteen players to be released by the club.

=== Hartlepool United ===
After being released by Stevenage, Worley signed for Hartlepool United on 8 June 2015, becoming Ronnie Moore's fourth signing of the summer. Upon joining the club, Worley stated that Manager Ronnie Moore convinced him to join the club and that confidence was another factor. Addition to the move to Hartlepool United, Worley was given number four shirt ahead of a new season and reunited with team-mate Carl Magnay and Michael Woods.

After scoring once in eight pre-season friendly matches with Hartlepool United, Worley made his Hartlepool United debut, where he played 90 minutes, in the opening game of the season, in a 2–0 win over Morecambe. However, in a match against York City, Worley soon suffered an injury that saw him substituted in the first ten minutes to the game. After recovering from his injury, Worley made his Hartlepool United return against Sheffield United in the first round of the Football League Trophy, where he was given the captaincy and played 120 minutes, leading to a penalty shootout, but lost 5–4.

However, his return was soon short-lived when he suffered recurring injuries that saw him make five appearances in all competitions. It first started when he suffered a toe injury in early-September. Worley soon suffered ankle injury during a match against Burnley's Reserve at the end of September. At the end of the 2015–16 season, Worley was among six players to be released by Hartlepool United.

=== Salford City ===
On 5 August 2016, Worley joined Salford City after playing in the pre-season matches.

He made his debut for the club, coming on as a late substitute, in a 2–2 draw against FC Halifax Town on 6 September 2016. After making another appearance for Salford United, however, Worley left the club in October and eventually retired from professional football. Following this, he re-joined Chelsea as a scout in the north-west.

== Career statistics ==
Appearances and goals by club, season and competition
Season	Club	League			FA Cup		League Cup		Other		Total	
Season	Club	Division	Apps	Goals	Apps	Goals	Apps	Goals	Apps	Goals	Apps	Goals
Chelsea	2006–07	Premier League	0	0	0	0	0	0	0	0	0	0
Chelsea	2007–08	Premier League	0	0	0	0	0	0	0	0	0	0
Chelsea	Total		0	0	0	0	0	0	0	0	0	0
Doncaster Rovers (loan)	2006–07	League One	10	0	0	0	0	0	0	0	10	0
Carlisle United (loan)	2007–08	League One	1	0	0	0	0	0	0	0	1	0
Leicester City (loan)	2007–08	Championship	2	0	0	0	0	0	0	0	2	0
Leicester City	2008–09	League One	0	0	0	0	0	0	0	0	0	0
Leicester City	2009–10	Championship	0	0	0	0	0	0	0	0	0	0
Leicester City	Total		0	0	0	0	0	0	0	0	0	0
Luton Town (loan)	2008–09	League Two	8	0	0	0	0	0	2 (Note: Appearances in Football League Trophy)	0	10	0
Crewe Alexandra (loan)	2009–10	League Two	23	1	0	0	0	0	1	0	24	1
Oxford United	2010–11	League Two	43	1	1	0	2	0	0	0	46	1
Oxford United	2011–12	League Two	10	0	1	0	0	0	1	0	12	0
Oxford United	2012–13	League Two	9	1	0	0	0	0	2	1	11	2
Oxford United	Total		62	2	2	0	2	0	3	1	69	3
Newport County	2013–14	League Two	26	4	3	0	2	0	2	0	33	4
Stevenage	2014–15	League Two	3	0	0	0	1	0	0	0	4	0
Hartlepool United	2015–16	League Two	3	0	0	0	1	0	1	0	5	0
Career total			138	7	5	0	6	0	9	1	158	8
