= Ryan Hall (footballer) =

English footballer

Personal information
- Full name: Ryan Marcus Leon Hall
- Date of birth: 4 January 1988 (age 38)
- Place of birth: Dulwich, England
- Height: 5 ft 10 in (1.78 m)
- Positions: Winger; striker

Team information
- Current team: AFC Whyteleafe

Youth career
- –2005: Crystal Palace

Senior career*
Years	Team	Apps	(Gls)
2005–2008	Crystal Palace	1	(0)
2006–2007	→ Lewes (loan)	3	(1)
2008	→ Dagenham & Redbridge (loan)	8	(2)
2008	→ Crawley Town (loan)	7	(2)
2008–2010	Bromley	58	(17)
2010–2013	Southend United	86	(19)
2012–2013	→ Leeds United (loan)	5	(0)
2013	Leeds United	3	(0)
2013	→ Sheffield United (loan)	4	(0)
2013–2014	Bromley	6	(0)
2014	Milton Keynes Dons	11	(1)
2014–2015	Rotherham United	3	(1)
2014	→ Notts County (loan)	4	(0)
2015–2016	Luton Town	17	(0)
2017	Bromley	6	(0)
2017–2018	Merstham		
2018	Welling United	13	(0)
2018–2019	Eastbourne Borough	30	(5)
2019–2024	Beckenham Town		
2024	Croydon		
2024–	AFC Whyteleafe		

International career^{‡}
2010	England C	1	(0)
- * Club domestic league appearances and goals as of 15:51, 16 November 2024 (UTC) ‡ National team caps and goals as of 12:00, 29 November 2013 (UTC)

Ryan Marcus Leon Hall (born 4 January 1988) is an English semi-professional footballer who plays as a winger or a striker for Isthmian League Premier Division club AFC Whyteleafe. He earned one cap for the England national C team in 2010.

== Club career ==
=== Crystal Palace ===
Born in Dulwich, Greater London, Hall came through the youth system at Crystal Palace, under then first-team manager Iain Dowie. Hall went out on loan to Conference South club Lewes to gain experience during the 2006–07 season, scoring on his debut.

Hall returned to Crystal Palace, now managed by Peter Taylor, for the 2007–08 season and made his debut for the club as a half-time substitute for Franck Songo'o in a 1–1 draw with Queens Park Rangers on 10 November 2007. He made a further appearance as a 73rd-minute substitute for Clinton Morrison in a 2–0 away defeat to Watford in the FA Cup third round on 5 January 2008.

One week later, Hall was signed by League Two club Dagenham & Redbridge on a one-month loan deal. He made his Dagenham & Redbridge debut on the same day in a 1–0 away defeat to Morecambe, prior to having his loan spell extended for a second month. Hall returned to Crystal Palace having scored twice in eight appearances during his loan.

Hall's first-team opportunities remained limited under new Crystal Palace manager Neil Warnock, prompting him to sign for Conference Premier club Crawley Town on loan until the end of the season. He made his Crawley Town debut two days later in a 2–1 away defeat to Grays Athletic. During his next appearance one week later, Hall scored a free-kick in a 6–1 home win over York City. In his final appearance for the club, he scored a volley to open the scoring in a 2–1 away win over Torquay United on 26 April 2008. Hall made seven appearances, scoring twice during his loan spell.

=== Bromley ===
Hall made a permanent transfer to Conference South club Bromley on 1 August 2008, where he stayed for two years, during which time he scored 16 goals in 58 appearances. During his two-year stay, he went on trial with League Two club Grimsby Town, playing in a reserves match against Hartlepool United on 25 March 2009.

=== Southend United ===
On 17 July 2010, Hall signed a pre-contract agreement with Southend United due to the club being under a transfer embargo. The embargo was lifted on 6 August 2010 and Hall's transfer was registered to the Football Association. Hall missed the opening match of the 2010–11 season against Stockport County due to an outstanding suspension after he picked up a red card playing for Bromley in the last game of the previous season. Subsequently, he made his debut in a 3–2 home win over Bristol City in the League Cup first round on 10 August 2010. Hall scored his first goal for Southend, netting after just 32 seconds in a 2–1 away win over Rotherham United on 15 January 2011. He signed a two-year contract extension with the club on 14 April 2011, prior to being voted as runner-up for the Southend Player of the Year award, behind Chris Barker. Over the course of the season, he achieved more assists than any other player in League Two.

In Hall's second season at Southend, he scored 14 goals and gained 25 assists, his 25 assists being the highest assist ratio in the top four divisions. In August 2012, Hall was subject of a bid from Championship club Peterborough United. After Hall fell out with manager Paul Sturrock during the 2012–13 pre season, Sturrock claimed Hall was not 'mentally attuned' to play at that present time due to the transfer speculation surrounding him. On 13 September 2012, Blackpool manager Ian Holloway announced that Hall had been training with the club and nearly signed during the transfer window. Blackpool approached Southend about a loan deal for Hall, with a view to a permanent deal in January, however they were unable to agree personal terms and the move fell through, thus Hall returned to Southend.

=== Leeds United ===
By October 2012, Hall was interesting Championship club Leeds United who wanted to sign him on loan, with a view to a permanent transfer. Leeds completed the loan signing of Hall on 18 October 2012, reuniting him with his former Crystal Palace manager Neil Warnock. Hall was given the number 30 shirt, and made his debut in a 1–0 home defeat to Birmingham City as a late substitute. To help build up his match fitness, Hall was put into Leeds' development squad where he scored four goals in one match against Derby County reserves. Hall made his first start for Leeds in a 1–0 away defeat to Millwall on 18 November 2012. Following the takeover of Leeds United by GFH Capital in December 2012, the club finalised a deal with Southend United to sign Hall permanently, agreeing a two-and-a-half-year contract with the player.

Hall failed to cement a place in the Leeds first team and agreed a one-month loan deal with League One club Sheffield United on 20 September 2013. Hall made five appearances for Sheffield United during his loan, but on his return to his parent club, Leeds United announced that Hall had been suspended pending an investigation into a breach of discipline. Hall was subsequently released from his contract on 24 November 2013.

=== Return to Bromley ===
On 6 December 2013, Hall rejoined Bromley on a short-term deal and would play for the club for free. He made his return in a 3–0 home win over Farnborough a day after rejoining, coming on as a 65th-minute substitute for Brendan Kiernan. Three days later, he came on as a 90th-minute substitute for Bradley Goldberg in a 2–0 away win over Dover Athletic. Hall's first starting appearance came in a 1–0 away win over Weston-super-Mare on 21 December 2013. Further starting appearances followed in a 0–0 draw with Ebbsfleet United on 26 December 2013, followed by a 2–1 away win over Whitehawk two days later. He was the named in the matchday squad for the final time for a 3–1 away win over Ebbsfleet United, though he remained an unused substitute.

=== Milton Keynes Dons ===
On 4 February 2014, Hall signed for League One club Milton Keynes Dons until the end of the 2013–14 season. He made his debut four days after signing as an 85th-minute substitute for Samir Carruthers in a 3–0 away win over Walsall. Hall scored his only goal on the final day of the season in a 3–1 home defeat to Leyton Orient. He made 11 league appearances for the club, before being released upon the expiry of his contract.

=== Rotherham United ===
Hall joined Championship club Rotherham United on a free transfer during the build-up to the 2014–15 season, making his debut in a 1–0 home win over Fleetwood Town in the League Cup first round on 12 August 2014. Four days later, he scored his first goal for the club in a 1–0 home win over Wolverhampton Wanderers, after coming on as a half-time substitute for John Swift. After struggling to become a regular first-team player, Hall joined Notts County on a one-month loan. He made four league appearances and featured twice in the Football League Trophy during his loan spell.

=== Luton Town ===
On 31 January 2015, Hall joined League Two club Luton Town on a free transfer, signing an 18-month contract, having previously played under manager John Still who previously signed him on loan at Dagenham & Redbridge. He made his Luton debut in a 1–1 draw with Oxford United one week later. Hall retained his place in the starting lineup for the next match, a 2–2 draw with York City three days later. However, he was dropped to the bench and remained an unused substitute during a 1–0 home win over Carlisle United. Hall replaced Matt Robinson has a half-time substitute during a 1–0 away defeat to Mansfield Town on 17 February 2015. Subsequent to the match, Hall picked up an injury which ruled him out for over a month, before later returning to training. To build up his match fitness, Hall twice completed 90 minutes for the development squad, firstly in a 3–1 defeat to Cambridge United on 18 March 2015, followed by a 5–2 win over Portsmouth on 31 March 2015. Hall returned to first-team action on 6 April 2015, playing for 74 minutes in a 1–0 away win over Tranmere Rovers, before being replaced by Alex Lawless. He went on to make a further three appearances to end the 2014–15 season having made seven league appearances for Luton.

Hall began the 2015–16 season by playing the full 90 minutes in a 3–2 away defeat to Yeovil Town on 22 August 2015. Three days later, he came on as a 61st-minute substitute for Pelly Ruddock Mpanzu as Luton took Premier League club Stoke City to a penalty shoot-out in a League Cup second round fixture, only to lose 8–7 on penalties after the match ended 1–1 after extra-time. During a 2–1 home defeat to Plymouth Argyle on 24 October 2015, Hall received two yellow cards within a couple of minutes of each other and was subsequently sent off. However, this caused some confusion because it wasn't made clear in the aftermath of the first incident that Hall had been a shown a yellow card, thus he wasn't expecting a subsequent red card following the second incident. This led to an apology from the Football Association after Luton sought clarification from both them and the referee which determined that the referee did not make it clear who received the yellow card in the first incident, but Hall would still be suspended for the next fixture against Dagenham & Redbridge. Hall's next appearance was during a 4–3 home defeat to Northampton Town, coming on as an 88th-minute substitute for Sean Long, a result which led to the sacking of manager John Still. He featured twice under caretaker manager Andy Awford, in a 0–0 draw with Portsmouth on 28 December 2015, followed by a 2–0 away defeat to Bristol Rovers five days later. Hall also featured in the first match under new Luton manager Nathan Jones, a 0–0 draw with Cambridge United two weeks later, but went off with a foot injury after 65 minutes and was replaced by Paddy McCourt. He returned to the matchday squad for a home fixture against Hartlepool United on 20 February 2016, coming on as a 72nd-minute substitute for Alex Lawless during a 2–1 win. However, a succession of injuries ruled him out for the rest of the season, after which Luton announced he would be released upon the expiry of his contract, a decision manager Nathan Jones described as 'logical' as a result of missing a significant amount of training and a lack of game time.

=== Return to non-League ===
Hall re-signed for National League club Bromley on 4 March 2017. He made his third debut for Bromley later that day as a 67th-minute substitute for Dave Martin in a 0–0 draw away to Boreham Wood.

On 5 August 2017, Hall signed for Isthmian League Premier Division club Merstham.

He signed for National League South club Welling United on 9 February 2018 and made his debut the following day in a 3–2 home defeat to Gloucester City. Hall was not retained by Welling after the end of the season, having failed to score in 13 appearances for the club.

Hall signed for another National League South club, Eastbourne Borough, on 2 August 2018.

In February 2024, Hall joined Southern Counties East Football League First Division club Croydon. He netted direct from the kick-off inside three seconds against Cockfosters in the London Senior Trophy, one of the fastest strikes on record.

In November 2024, Hall joined Combined Counties Premier Division South side AFC Whyteleafe.

== International career ==
On 22 May 2010, Hall was called up to the England national C team by manager Paul Fairclough. Hall made his debut for England C as a substitute, replacing Max Porter against the Republic of Ireland U23 team in the International Challenge Trophy on 26 May 2010.

== Career statistics ==
As of end of 2018–19 season

Appearances and goals by club, season and competition
Club	Season	League			FA Cup		League Cup		Other		Total	
Club	Season	Division	Apps	Goals	Apps	Goals	Apps	Goals	Apps	Goals	Apps	Goals
Crystal Palace	2005–06	Championship	0	0	0	0	0	0	0	0	0	0
Crystal Palace	2006–07	Championship	0	0	0	0	0	0	—		0	0
Crystal Palace	2007–08	Championship	1	0	1	0	0	0	0	0	2	0
Crystal Palace	Total		1	0	1	0	0	0	0	0	2	0
Lewes (loan)	2006–07	Conference South	3	1	—		—		—		3	1
Dagenham & Redbridge (loan)	2007–08	League Two	8	2	—		—		—		8	2
Crawley Town (loan)	2007–08	Conference Premier	7	2	—		—		—		7	2
Bromley	2008–09	Conference South	31	11	1	0	—		2 (Note: One appearance in Conference League Cup, one in FA Trophy)	0	34	11
Bromley	2009–10	Conference South	27	6	3	1	—		0	0	30	7
Bromley	Total		58	17	4	1	—		2	0	64	18
Southend United	2010–11	League Two	41	9	2	0	2	0	3 (Note: Appearance(s) in Football League Trophy)	0	48	9
Southend United	2011–12	League Two	43	10	4	1	1	0	6 (Note: Four appearances and three goals in Football League Trophy, two appearances in League Two play-offs)	3	54	14
Southend United	2012–13	League Two	2	0	—		1	0	0	0	3	0
Southend United	Total		86	19	6	1	4	0	9	3	105	23
Leeds United	2012–13	Championship	8	0	1	0	—		—		9	0
Leeds United	2013–14	Championship	0	0	0	0	0	0	—		0	0
Leeds United	Total		8	0	1	0	0	0	—		9	0
Sheffield United (loan)	2013–14	League One	4	0	—		—		1	0	5	0
Bromley	2013–14	Conference South	6	0	—		—		—		6	0
Milton Keynes Dons	2013–14	League One	11	1	—		—		—		11	1
Rotherham United	2014–15	Championship	3	1	0	0	1	0	—		4	1
Notts County (loan)	2014–15	League One	4	0	—		—		2	0	6	0
Luton Town	2014–15	League Two	7	0	—		—		—		7	0
Luton Town	2015–16	League Two	10	0	0	0	1	0	2	0	13	0
Luton Town	Total		17	0	0	0	1	0	2	0	20	0
Bromley	2016–17	National League	6	0	—		—		—		6	0
Welling United	2017–18	National League South	13	0	—		—		—		13	0
Eastbourne Borough	2018–19	National League South	30	5	3	2	—		6 (Note: Three appearances in Sussex Senior Challenge Cup, three in FA Trophy)	0	39	7
Career total			265	48	15	4	6	0	22	3	308	55
