= 2016–17 Milton Keynes Dons F.C. season =

Milton Keynes Dons
2016–17 season
- Chairman: Pete Winkelman
- Manager: Karl Robinson (until 23 October 2016); Richie Barker (caretaker, from 23 October 2016 until 3 December 2016); Robbie Neilson (from 3 December 2016)
- Stadium: Stadium MK
- League One: 12th
- FA Cup: Third round
- EFL Cup: Second round
- EFL Trophy: Second round
- Top goalscorer: League: Kieran Agard (12); All: Kieran Agard (14)
- Highest home attendance: 21,545 (vs Bolton Wanderers); 4 February 2017, League One
- Lowest home attendance: 2,114 (vs Barnet); 30 August 2016, EFL Trophy Group F
- Average home league attendance: 10,307
- Biggest win: 5–3 (vs Northampton Town); 21 January 2017, League One
- Biggest defeat: 1–4 (vs Yeovil Town); 6 December 2016, EFL Trophy R2; 1–4 (vs Norwich City U23); 8 November 2016, EFL Trophy Group F
Home colours	Away colours	Third colours

The 2016–17 season was Milton Keynes Dons' 13th season in their existence, and was their first season back in League One, the third level of English football, following relegation from the Championship the previous season.

Along with competing in League One, the club also participated in the FA Cup, EFL Cup and EFL Trophy.

The season covered the period from 1 July 2016 to 30 June 2017.

== Competitions ==
=== League One ===
Pos	Team	Pld	W	D	L	GF	GA	GD	Pts
10	Bristol Rovers	46	18	12	16	68	70	−2	66
11	Peterborough United	46	17	11	18	62	62	0	62
12	Milton Keynes Dons	46	16	13	17	60	58	+2	61
13	Charlton Athletic	46	14	18	14	60	53	+7	60
14	Walsall	46	14	16	16	51	58	−7	58

Source: BBC Sport
Rules for classification: 1) Points; 2) Goal difference; 3) Number of goals scored

Matches

Win	Draw	Loss

Date	Opponent	Venue	Result	Scorers	Attendance	Ref
6 August 2016 – 15:00	Shrewsbury Town	Away	1–0	Powell	5,452	
13 August 2016 – 15:00	Millwall	Home	2–2	Agard (2)	10,232	
16 August 2016 – 19:45	Bradford City	Home	1–2	Upson	8,166	
20 August 2016 – 15:00	Rochdale	Away	1–0	Wootton	2,176	
27 August 2016 – 15:00	Peterborough United	Home	0–2		10,621	
4 September 2016 – 12:00	Northampton Town	Away	2–3	Bowditch, Carruthers	6,618	
10 September 2016 – 15:00	Bolton Wanderers	Away	1–1	Colclough	12,727	
17 September 2016 – 15:00	Oxford United	Home	0–0		12,340	
24 September 2016 – 15:00	Fleetwood Town	Away	4–1	Colclough (3), Bowditch	2,518	
27 September 2016 – 19:45	Bury	Home	1–3	Reeves	7,652	
1 October 2016 – 15:00	Oldham Athletic	Away	2–0	Reeves, Agard	3,273	
9 October 2016 – 14:15	Port Vale	Home	0–1		8,259	
15 October 2016 – 15:00	Scunthorpe United	Away	1–2	Agard	4,238	
18 October 2016 – 19:45	Bristol Rovers	Home	3–3	Bowditch, G.B. Williams, Reeves	8,366	
22 October 2016 – 15:00	Southend United	Home	0–3		11,039	
29 October 2016 – 15:00	Sheffield United	Away	1–2	Potter	20,495	
12 November 2016 – 15:00	Walsall	Home	1–1	Bowditch	8,188	
19 November 2016 – 15:00	Bristol Rovers	Away	0–0		9,031	
22 November 2016 – 19:45	Chesterfield	Home	2–3	Powell, Colclough	7,429	
26 November 2016 – 15:00	Coventry City	Away	2–1	Upson (2)	9,640	
10 December 2016 – 13:00	AFC Wimbledon	Home	1–0	Bowditch	11,185	
17 December 2016 – 15:00	Gillingham	Away	0–1		5,682	
26 December 2016 – 15:00	Charlton Athletic	Home	0–1		10,257	
30 December 2016 – 15:00	Swindon Town	Home	3–2	Agard (2), Maynard	9,385	
2 January 2017 – 15:00	Chesterfield	Away	0–0		5,554	
21 January 2017 – 15:00	Northampton Town	Home	5–3	Agard, Aneke (2), Potter, Barnes	12,300	
28 January 2017 – 15:00	Peterborough United	Away	4–0	Barnes, Agard, Aneke (2)	6,617	
4 February 2017 – 15:00	Bolton Wanderers	Home	1–1	Agard	21,545	
7 February 2017 – 19:45	Oldham Athletic	Home	1–0	Maynard	7,598	
11 February 2017 – 15:00	Oxford United	Away	0–1		9,179	
14 February 2017 – 19:45	Bury	Away	0–0		2,005	
18 February 2017 – 15:00	Fleetwood Town	Home	0–1		8,278	
25 February 2017 – 15:00	Shrewsbury Town	Home	2–1	Agard, Downing	8,322	
28 February 2017 – 19:45	Bradford City	Away	2–2	O'Keefe, G.B. Williams	16,725	
4 March 2017 – 15:00	Millwall	Away	1–2	Reeves	9,636	
11 March 2017 – 15:00	Rochdale	Home	2–2	Agard, Reeves	10,569	
14 March 2017 – 19:45	AFC Wimbledon	Away	0–2		4,112	
18 March 2017 – 15:00	Coventry City	Home	1–0	O'Keefe	9,060	
25 March 2017 – 15:00	Port Vale	Away	0–0		3,877	
1 April 2017 – 15:00	Gillingham	Home	3–2	Muirhead, Barnes, Lewington	8,807	
4 April 2017 – 19:45	Charlton Athletic	Away	2–0	O'Keefe, Barnes	10,943	
8 April 2017 – 15:00	Swindon Town	Away	1–1	Agard	7,946	
14 April 2017 – 15:00	Scunthorpe United	Home	0–1		9,274	
17 April 2017 – 15:00	Southend United	Away	2–1	Reeves, Walsh	9,009	
22 April 2017 – 15:00	Sheffield United	Home	0–3		18,180	
30 April 2017 – 12:00	Walsall	Away	4–1	Muirhead, Reeves, O'Keefe, Barnes	5,004	

Source: Sky Sports

=== FA Cup ===
Matches

Win	Draw	Loss

Date	Round	Opponent	Venue	Result	Scorers	Attendance	Ref
5 November 2016 – 15:00	First round	Spennymoor Town	Home	3–2	Reeves, Thomas-Asante, Agard	4,099	
3 December 2016 – 15:00	Second round	Charlton Athletic	Away	0–0		4,982	
13 December 2016 – 19:45	Second round (replay)	Charlton Athletic	Home	3–1 (Note: After extra-time. 1–1 at the conclusion of 90 minutes.)	Powell, Reeves, Bowditch	3,655	
7 January 2017 – 15:00	Third round	Brighton & Hove Albion	Away	0–2		11,091	

=== EFL Cup ===
Matches

Win	Draw	Loss

Date	Round	Opponent	Venue	Result	Scorers	Attendance	Ref
9 August 2016 – 19:45	First round	Newport County	Away	3–2	Bowditch (2), Tilney	1,402	
23 August 2016 – 19:45	Second round	Reading	Away	2–2 (Note: After extra-time. 1–1 after 90 minutes. Reading won 4–2 on penalties.)	Bowditch, Tshimanga	6,848	

=== EFL Trophy ===
Southern Group F Table

Pos	Div	Team	Pld	W	PW	PL	L	GF	GA	GD	Pts	Qualification
1	ACA	Norwich City U21	3	3	0	0	0	15	2	+13	9	Advance to Round 2
2	L1	Milton Keynes Dons	3	1	1	0	1	4	6	−2	5	Advance to Round 2
3	L1	Peterborough United	3	1	0	0	2	3	8	−5	3	
4	L2	Barnet	3	0	0	1	2	3	9	−6	1	

Source: Sky Sports

'Matches

Win	Draw	Loss

Date	Round	Opponent	Venue	Result	Scorers	Attendance	Ref
30 August 2016 – 19:45	Group stage	Barnet	Home	2–2 (Note: After 90 minutes. Milton Keynes Dons gained an extra point with a 5–3 win on penalties)	Reeves, Walsh	2,114	
4 October 2016 – 19:30	Group stage	Peterborough United	Away	1–0	Agard	1,793	
8 November 2016 – 19:00	Group stage	Norwich City Academy	Away	1–4	Tapp	1,042	
6 December 2016 – 19:45	Second round	Yeovil Town	Away	1–4	Lacey (o.g.)	1,308	

== Player details ==
Note: Players' ages as of the club's opening fixture of the 2016–17 season.

#	Name	Nationality	Position	Date of birth (age)	Signed from	Signed in	Transfer fee
Goalkeepers
1	David Martin	(England)	GK	22 January 1986 (aged 30)	(England) Liverpool	2010	Free
19	Lee Nicholls	(England)	GK	5 October 1992 (aged 23)	Free agent	2016	Free
29	Charlie Burns	(England)	GK	27 May 1995 (aged 21)	Academy	2014	Trainee
Defenders
2	George Baldock	(Greece)	RB	9 March 1993 (aged 23)	Academy	2009	Trainee
3	Dean Lewington	(England)	LB	18 May 1984 (aged 32)	(England) Wimbledon	2004	Free
4	Joe Walsh	(Wales)	CB	13 May 1992 (aged 24)	(England) Crawley Town	2015	Undisclosed
5	Scott Wootton	(England)	CB	12 September 1991 (aged 24)	Free agent	2016	Free
12	George Williams	(England)	RB	14 April 1993 (aged 23)	(England) Barnsley	2016	Free
21	Callum Brittain	(England)	RB	12 March 1998 (aged 18)	Academy	2016	Trainee
22	Oran Jackson	(England)	CB	16 October 1998 (aged 17)	Academy	2016	Trainee
23	Paul Downing	(England)	CB	26 October 1991 (aged 24)	(England) Walsall	2016	Free
24	Ben Tilney	(England)	LB	28 February 1997 (aged 19)	Academy	2014	Trainee
34	Finn Tapp	(England)	CB	9 November 1999 (aged 16)	Academy	2016	Trainee
Midfielders
6	Ed Upson	(England)	CM	21 November 1989 (aged 26)	(England) Millwall	2016	Free
8	Darren Potter	(Republic of Ireland)	DM	21 December 1984 (aged 31)	(England) Sheffield Wednesday	2011	Free
10	Ben Reeves	(Northern Ireland)	AM	19 November 1991 (aged 24)	Free agent	2013	Free
11	Stuart O'Keefe	(England)	CM	4 March 1991 (aged 25)	(Wales) Cardiff City	2017	Loan
20	Giorgio Rasulo	(England)	CM	23 January 1997 (aged 19)	Academy	2012	Trainee
26	Connor Furlong	(Scotland)	CM	7 February 1998 (aged 18)	Academy	2016	Trainee
31	David Kasumu	(Nigeria)	CM	5 October 1999 (aged 16)	Academy	2017	Trainee
Forwards
7	Maecky Ngombo	(Belgium)	CF	31 March 1995 (aged 21)	(Germany) Fortuna Düsseldorf	2017	Loan
9	Dean Bowditch	(England)	LW	15 June 1986 (aged 30)	(England) Yeovil Town	2011	Free
14	Kieran Agard	(England)	CF	10 October 1989 (aged 26)	(England) Bristol City	2016	Undisclosed
16	Robbie Muirhead	(Scotland)	CF	8 March 1996 (aged 20)	(Scotland) Hears	2017	Undisclosed
17	Daniel Powell	(England)	LW	12 March 1991 (aged 25)	Academy	2008	Trainee
18	Harvey Barnes	(England)	LW	9 December 1997 (aged 18)	(England) Leicester City	2017	Loan
25	Chuks Aneke	(England)	CF	3 July 1993 (aged 23)	(Belgium) Zulte Waregem	2016	Free
28	Nicky Maynard	(England)	CF	11 December 1986 (aged 29)	Free agent	2015	Free
30	Brandon Thomas-Asante	(Ghana)	LW	29 December 1998 (aged 17)	Academy	2016	Trainee
33	Sam Nombe	(England)	CF	22 October 1998 (aged 17)	Academy	2017	Trainee
Out on loan
27	Kabongo Tshimanga	(England)	CF	22 July 1997 (aged 19)	Academy	2014	Trainee
Left club during season
7	Samir Carruthers	(Republic of Ireland)	AM	4 April 1993 (aged 23)	(England) Aston Villa	2014	Undisclosed
11	George Williams	(Wales)	LW	7 September 1995 (aged 20)	(England) Fulham	2016	Loan
16	Jack Hendry	(Scotland)	CB	7 September 1995 (aged 20)	(England) Wigan Athletic	2016	Loan
49	Ryan Colclough	(England)	LW	27 December 1994 (aged 21)	(England) Wigan Athletic	2016	Loan

== Transfers ==
=== Transfers in ===
Date from	Position	Name	From	Fee	Ref.
1 July 2016	DF	(England) Paul Downing	Walsall	Free transfer	
1 July 2016	MF	(England) Ed Upson	Millwall	Free transfer	
1 July 2016	DF	(England) George B Williams	Barnsley	Free transfer	
2 August 2016	FW	(England) Chuks Aneke	(Belgium) Zulte Waragem	Free transfer (Note: Mutual contract termination.)	
3 August 2016	GK	(England) Lee Nicholls	Wigan Athletic	Undisclosed	
11 August 2016	FW	(England) Kieran Agard	Bristol City	Undisclosed	
19 January 2017	FW	(Scotland) Robbie Muirhead	(Scotland) Heart of Midlothian	Undisclosed	

=== Transfers out ===
Date from	Position	Name	To	Fee	Ref.
1 July 2016	DF	(Northern Ireland) Lee Hodson	(Scotland) Rangers	Undisclosed	
1 July 2016	DF	(England) Antony Kay	Bury	Free transfer	
1 July 2016	FW	(England) Alex Revell	Northampton Town	Free transfer	
12 July 2016	DF	(England) Kyle McFadzean	Burton Albion	Undisclosed	
24 August 2016	FW	(Wales) Simon Church	(Netherlands) Roda JC Kerkrade	Undisclosed	
3 January 2017	MF	(Republic of Ireland) Samir Carruthers	Sheffield United	Undisclosed	

=== Loans in ===
Start date	Position	Name	From	End date	Ref.
29 July 2016	FW	(Wales) George C Williams	Fulham	End of season	
31 August 2016	FW	(England) Ryan Colclough	Wigan Athletic	1 January 2017 (Note: Recalled. Originally until end of season.)	
20 January 2017	MF	(England) Harvey Barnes	Leicester City	End of season	
30 January 2017	FW	(Belgium) Maecky Ngombo	(Germany) Fortuna Düsseldorf	End of season	
31 January 2017	MF	(England) Stuart O'Keefe	(Wales) Cardiff City	End of season	

=== Loans out ===
Start date	Position	Name	To	End date	Ref.
31 January 2017	FW	(Democratic Republic of the Congo) Kabongo Tshimanga	Yeovil Town	End of season	
