= Ben Tilney =

English footballer

Personal information
- Full name: Benjamin Rowland Tilney
- Date of birth: 28 February 1997 (age 29)
- Place of birth: Luton, England
- Height: 1.76 m (5 ft 9 1/2 in)
- Position: Left-back

Team information
- Current team: Carrick Rangers
- Number: 39

Youth career
- 2004–2014: Milton Keynes Dons

Senior career*
Years	Team	Apps	(Gls)
2014–2018	Milton Keynes Dons	6	(0)
2015	→ Histon (loan)		
2016	→ Brackley Town (loan)	5	(0)
2017–2018	→ Brackley Town (loan)	5	(0)
2018–2021	Larne	51	(9)
2021	→ Portadown (loan)	24	(3)
2021–	Carrick Rangers	106	(4)
- * Club domestic league appearances and goals as of 22 February 2026

Benjamin Rowland Tilney (born 28 February 1997) is an English footballer who plays as a left wing-back for NIFL Premiership club Carrick Rangers.

Tilney has had previous spells with Portadown, Larne, Milton Keynes Dons, Brackley Town and Histon.

== Club career ==
=== Milton Keynes Dons ===
Tilney joined Milton Keynes Dons' academy in 2004, progressing through several age groups and featuring several times for the club's development squad. In an April 2013 interview, he revealed that Lionel Messi was his football idol, that La Liga was his favourite league and that his favourite position was in central attacking midfield. In October 2014, he signed professional terms with the club until June 2016. On 11 September 2015, he joined Southern Premier side Histon, initially on a one-month deal which was later extended. On 13 October, he scored his first goal as a professional in a 4–1 win over AFC Rushden & Diamonds. On 26 March 2016, Tilney joined National League North side Brackley Town on a one-month loan, and made three appearances for the club.

He made his first team debut for the Dons on 9 August 2016, and marked his debut with a 25-yard goal in a 3–1 win over Newport County in an EFL Cup match at Rodney Parade. On 14 February 2017, Tilney made his league debut, starting in a 0–0 draw away to Bury. On 14 June 2017, Tilney's contract was extended until summer 2018. On 8 August 2017, Tilney re-joined National League North club Brackley Town on a season-long loan, but was recalled early in January 2018.

=== Larne ===
On 8 June 2018, NIFL Championship club Larne announced that Tilney would be joining the club on 1 July 2018 following the expiration of his contract with Milton Keynes Dons. Tilney scored his first goal for the club on 1 September 2018, the winning goal in a 2–1 away victory over PSNI. On 9 March 2019, Tilney scored in a 3–0 win over Ballinamallard United to clinch promotion for the club to the NIFL Premiership. He finished the season with 37 appearances and 10 goals in all competitions from left-back and was named in the NIFL Championship Team of the Year for the 2018–19 season.

== Career statistics ==
As of 7 March 2020.

Appearances and goals by club, season and competition
Club	Season	League			National Cup		League Cup		Other		Total	
Club	Season	Division	Apps	Goals	Apps	Goals	Apps	Goals	Apps	Goals	Apps	Goals
Milton Keynes Dons	2014–15	League One	0	0	0	0	0	0	0	0	0	0
Milton Keynes Dons	2015–16	Championship	0	0	0	0	0	0	0	0	0	0
Milton Keynes Dons	2016–17	League One	6	0	0	0	2	1	3 (Note: Appearance(s) in EFL Trophy.)	0	11	1
Milton Keynes Dons	2017–18	League One	0	0	0	0	0	0	0	0	0	0
Milton Keynes Dons	Total		6	0	0	0	2	1	3	0	11	1
Brackley Town (loan)	2015–16	National League North	5	0	0	0	—		—		5	0
Brackley Town (loan)	2017–18	National League North	5	0	0	0	—		2 (Note: Appearance(s) in FA Trophy.)	0	7	0
Brackley Town (loan)	Total		10	0	0	0	—		2	0	12	0
Larne	2018–19	NIFL Championship	30	9	3 (Note: Appearance(s) in Irish Cup.)	0	1 (Note: Appearance(s) in NIFL League Cup.)	0	3 (Note: Appearance(s) in County Antrim Shield.)	1	37	10
Larne	2019–20	NIFL Premiership	21	0	1	0	1	0	0	0	23	0
Larne	Total		51	9	4	0	2	0	3	1	60	10
Career total			67	9	4	0	4	1	8	1	83	11

== Honours ==
Larne

- NIFL Championship: 2018–19

Individual

- NIFL Championship Team of the Year: 2018–19
