= 2010–11 Southend United F.C. season =

Southend United F.C.
2010-11 season
- Stadium: Roots Hall
- League Two: 13th
- FA Cup: First Round
- League Cup: Second Round
- FL Trophy: Regional Quarter Final

The English football club Southend United F.C. played in League Two in the 2010–11 season, finishing 13th out of 24 clubs. It played in the first round of the FA Cup and the second round of the Football League Cup, and reached the quarter-final of the Football League Trophy.

== Season summary ==
On 5 July 2010 former Sheffield Wednesday and Plymouth Argyle manager Paul Sturrock was announced as Southend's new manager with Tommy Widdrington as his assistant. Sturrock's first signings for Southend were former Northampton Town left back Peter Gilbert and striker Barry Corr who was released by Exeter City. Both players had played under Sturrock previously. With Southend being under a transfer embargo, both players could only sign pre-contract agreements.

A squad of 17 players were only registered in time to play on the eve of the new season as the club's transfer embargo was lifted. Sturrock led Southend to a respectable 13th-placed finish in his first season.

== League table ==
Pos	Team	Pld	W	D	L	GF	GA	GD	Pts
11	Port Vale	46	17	14	15	54	49	+5	65
12	Oxford United	46	17	12	17	58	60	−2	63
13	Southend United	46	16	13	17	62	56	+6	61
14	Aldershot Town	46	14	19	13	54	54	0	61
15	Macclesfield Town	46	14	13	19	59	73	−14	55

Updated to match(es) played on 28 May 2011. Source: The Football League
Rules for classification: 1) points; 2) goal difference; 3) number of goals scored.

== Results ==
=== League Two ===
7 August 2010 1	Southend United	1–1	Stockport County	Southend-on-Sea
15:00	Sturrock 90'	Report	Donnelly 83'	Stadium: Roots Hall; Attendance: 5,589; Referee: Iain Williamson

14 August 2010 2	Aldershot Town	1–0	Southend United	Aldershot
15:00	M. Morgan 81'	Report		Stadium: Recreation Ground; Attendance: 3,011; Referee: Graham Horwood

21 August 2010 3	Southend United	1–3	Port Vale	Southend-on-Sea
15:00	Owen 88' (o.g.)	Report	J. Richards 5'; Dodds 54'; M. Richards 83'	Stadium: Roots Hall; Attendance: 4,946; Referee: Roger East

27 August 2010 4	Bradford City	0–2	Southend United	Bradford
19:45		Report	Corr 16'; Grant 54'; Clohessy (red card) 77'	Stadium: Valley Parade; Attendance: 10,752; Referee: Paul Tierney

4 September 2010 5	Southend United	2–1	Torquay United	Southend-on-Sea
15:00	Grant 15'; Simpson 43'	Report	Zebroski 78'	Stadium: Roots Hall; Attendance: 5,505; Referee: Dean Whitestone

11 September 2010 6	Northampton Town	2–1	Southend United	Northampton
15:00	Osman 63'; Holt 76'	Report	Grant 57'	Stadium: Sixfields Stadium; Attendance: 5,720; Referee: Mark Haywood

18 September 2010 7	Southend United	2–3	Morecambe	Southend-on-Sea
15:00	Grant 22'; Corr 50'	Report	Drummond 21'; Mullin 26'; Spencer 73'	Stadium: Roots Hall; Attendance: 5,106; Referee: Mike Russell

25 September 2010 8	Hereford United	1–3	Southend United	Hereford
15:00	McQuilkin 4'	Report	Corr 27'; Timlin 52'; Sturrock 67'	Stadium: Edgar Street; Attendance: 2,104; Referee: Karl Evans

28 September 2010 9	Gillingham	0–0	Southend United	Gillingham
19:45		Report		Stadium: Priestfield Stadium; Attendance: 4,925; Referee: Danny McDermid

2 October 2010 10	Southend United	1–0	Lincoln City	Southend-on-Sea
15:00	Corr 3'	Report		Stadium: Roots Hall; Attendance: 5,154; Referee: Darren Sheldrake

9 October 2010 11	Chesterfield	2–1	Southend United	Chesterfield
15:00	Whitaker 27' (pen.); Boden 90'	Report	Grant 36'	Stadium: B2net Stadium; Attendance: 6,557; Referee: David Coote

16 October 2010 12	Southend United	0–2	Crewe Alexandra	Southend-on-Sea
15:00		Report	Donaldson 55'; Miller 77'	Stadium: Roots Hall; Attendance: 5,506; Referee: Andy Woolmer

23 October 2010 13	Bury	1–0	Southend United	Bury
15:00	Skarz 41'	Report		Stadium: Gigg Lane; Attendance: 3,531; Referee: Mark Brown

30 October 2010 14	Southend United	1–0	Rotherham United	Southend-on-Sea
15:00	Sturrock 5'	Report		Stadium: Roots Hall; Attendance: 5,533; Referee: Phil Crossley

13 November 2010 15	Southend United	1–1	Accrington Stanley	Southend-on-Sea
15:00	Bilel 65'	Report	Ryan 26'; Murphy 78'	Stadium: Roots Hall; Attendance: 4,748; Referee: Gary Sutton

20 November 2010 16	Shrewsbury Town	1–1	Southend United	Shrewsbury
15:00	Wright 49'	Report	Grant 87'	Stadium: New Meadow; Attendance: 5,406; Referee: Rob Shoebridge

23 November 2010 17	Stevenage	1–1	Southend United	Stevenage
19:45	Long 26'	Report	Corr 84'; Gilbert (red card) 90'	Stadium: Broadhall Way; Attendance: 2,544; Referee: Simon Hooper

11 December 2010 18	Burton Albion	3–1	Southend United	Burton upon Trent
15:00	Maghoma 37'; Prosser 45' (o.g.); Webster 57'	Report	Sturrock 51'	Stadium: Pirelli Stadium; Attendance: 2,604; Referee: Iain Williamson

14 December 2010 19	Cheltenham Town	0–2	Southend United	Cheltenham
19:45		Report	Midson 8', 14'	Stadium: Whaddon Road; Attendance: 2,229; Referee: Brendan Malone

1 January 2011 20	Oxford United	0–2	Southend United	Oxford
15:00		Report	Corr 18'; Clohessy 44'	Stadium: Kassam Stadium; Attendance: 7,362; Referee: Chris Sarginson

3 January 2011 21	Southend United	1–2	Cheltenham Town	Southend-on-Sea
15:00	Corr 77'	Report	Pack 4'; Thomas 5'	Stadium: Roots Hall; Attendance: 4,942; Referee: Phil Gibbs

8 January 2011 22	Southend United	2–3	Chesterfield	Southend-on-Sea
15:00	Easton 58'; Corr 83' (pen.)	Report	Whitaker 12' (pen.), 62' (pen.); Smalley 19'	Stadium: Roots Hall; Attendance: 5,021; Referee: Roger East

15 January 2011 23	Rotherham United	1–2	Southend United	Sheffield
15:00	Fenton 61'	Report	Hall 1'; Sturrock 13'	Stadium: Don Valley Stadium; Attendance: 4,310; Referee: Scott Mathieson

21 January 2011 24	Southend United	1–1	Bury	Southend-on-Sea
19:45	Bilel 90'	Report	Mozika 65'	Stadium: Roots Hall; Attendance: 5,175; Referee: Pat Miller

25 January 2011 25	Southend United	4–1	Macclesfield Town	Southend-on-Sea
19:45	Bilel 17', 39'; Hall 33'; Easton 43'	Report	Daniel 79'	Stadium: Roots Hall; Attendance: 5,011; Referee: Mike Russell

29 January 2011 26	Barnet	0–2	Southend United	Chipping Barnet, London
15:00		Report	Grant 25'; Corr 67'	Stadium: Underhill Stadium; Attendance: 2,867; Referee: Trevor Kettle

1 February 2011 27	Southend United	2–1	Oxford United	Southend-on-Sea
19:45	Hall 43'; Bilel 45'	Report	Constable 14'; Batt (red card) 67'	Stadium: Roots Hall; Attendance: 4,944; Referee: Keith Hill

5 February 2011 28	Southend United	0–2	Shrewsbury Town	Southend-on-Sea
15:00		Report	J. Taylor 43'; Harrold 60'	Stadium: Roots Hall; Attendance: 5,396; Referee: Graham Salisbury

15 February 2011 29	Southend United	3–2	Wycombe Wanderers	Southend-on-Sea
	Corr 50'; Ferdinand 59'; Easton 90+1'	Report	Pittman 31'; Rendell 89' (pen.)	Stadium: Roots Hall; Attendance: 4,499; Referee: Andy Woolmer

19 February 2011 30	Torquay United	1–1	Southend United	Torquay
15:00 GMT	Oastler (yellow card) 34'; Branston (yellow card) 37'; Kee 73'	Report	Gilbert (yellow card) 12'; Corr 81'	Stadium: Plainmoor; Attendance: 2,880; Referee: David Coote

22 February 2011 31	Southend United	2–1	Barnet	Southend-on-Sea
19:45 GMT	Easton 11'; Hall 16'	Report	Kabba 88'	Stadium: Roots Hall; Attendance: 5,501; Referee: David Phillips

26 February 2011 32	Southend United	1–1	Northampton Town	Southend-on-Sea
15:00 GMT	Corr 34'	Report	Johnson 27'	Stadium: Roots Hall; Attendance: 6,384; Referee: Russell Booth

5 March 2011 33	Morecambe	2–1	Southend United	Morecambe
	McCready 28'; Drummond 63'	Report	Corr 50' (pen.)	Stadium: Globe Arena; Attendance: 1,917; Referee: Chris Sarginson

8 March 2011 34	Southend United	2–2	Gillingham	Southend-on-Sea
19:45 GMT	Hall 15', 52'	Report	McDonald 7'; Akinfenwa 18' (pen.)	Stadium: Roots Hall; Attendance: 5,771; Referee: Brendan Malone

12 March 2011 35	Lincoln City	2–1	Southend United	Lincoln
	Grimes 38', 78'	Report	Sturrock 60'	Stadium: Sincil Bank; Attendance: 3,560; Referee: Peter Quinn

15 March 2011 36	Crewe Alexandra	1–0	Southend United	Crewe
19:45 GMT	Miller 65'	Report		Stadium: Gresty Road; Attendance: 3,319; Referee: Geoff Eltringham

18 March 2011 37	Southend United	4–0	Hereford United	Southend-on-Sea
	Crawford 36', 90+5'; Corr 65', 67'	Report		Stadium: Roots Hall; Attendance: 5,056; Referee: Graham Horwood

26 March 2011 38	Stockport County	2–1	Southend United	Stockport
13:00 GMT	Tansey 28' (pen.); Rowe 90'	Report	Asante 81'	Stadium: Edgeley Park; Attendance: 3,335; Referee: Craig Pawson

2 April 2011 39	Southend United	0–0	Aldershot Town	Southend-on-Sea
15:00 BST	Corr (yellow card) 72'; Grant (yellow card) 90'	Report	(yellow card) 66' Jones	Stadium: Roots Hall; Attendance: 5,557; Referee: Rob Lewis

5 April 2011 40	Accrington Stanley	3–1	Southend United	Accrington
19:45 BST	Craney 10'; Gornell 80'; Edwards 84' (pen.)	Report	Hall 58'	Stadium: Crown Ground; Attendance: 2,222; Referee: David Webb

9 April 2011 41	Port Vale	1–1	Southend United	Burslem, Stoke-on-Trent
15:00 BST	Taylor 25'	Report	Prosser 90'	Stadium: Vale Park; Attendance: 5,108; Referee: Phil Gibbs

15 April 2011 42	Southend United	4–0	Bradford City	Southend-on-Sea
15:00 BST	Corr 13' (pen.); Ferdinand 66'; Hall 43', 70'	Report		Stadium: Roots Hall; Attendance: 5,217; Referee: Mark Brown

22 April 2011 43	Southend United	1–0	Stevenage	Southend-on-Sea
15:00 BST	Corr 81'	Report		Stadium: Roots Hall; Attendance: 6,622; Referee: David Coote

25 April 2011 44	Macclesfield Town	0–0	Southend United	Macclesfield
15:00 BST		Report		Stadium: Moss Rose; Attendance: 1,427; Referee: Brendan Malone

30 April 2011 45	Southend United	1–1	Burton Albion	Southend-on-Sea
15:00 BST	Corr 3'; Sawyer (yellow card) 81' (yellow-red card) 90+3'	Report	Malone 28'; Maghoma (red card) 85'	Stadium: Roots Hall; Attendance: 5,730; Referee: Bobby Madley

7 May 2011 46	Wycombe Wanderers	3–1	Southend United	High Wycombe
15:00 BST	Donnelly 20'; Strevens 26'; Rendell 53'	Report	Grant 15'	Stadium: Adams Park; Attendance: 8,567; Referee: Neil Swarbrick

=== FA Cup ===
6 November 2010 Round 1	Macclesfield Town	2–2	Southend United	Macclesfield
15:00	Daniel 8'; Brown 47'		German 33' (pen.); Corr 76'	Stadium: Moss Rose; Attendance: 1,582

16 November 2010	Southend United	2–2 (3–5 p)	Macclesfield Town	Southend-on-Sea
19:45	Simpson 87'; Corr 105'		Sinclair 61'; Nsiala 99'	Stadium: Roots Hall; Attendance: 2,194
	Penalties
	German (penalty scored); Corr (penalty missed); Clohessy (penalty scored); Hall (penalty scored)		Chalmers (penalty scored); Barnett (penalty scored); Bencherif (penalty scored); Reid (penalty scored); Brown (penalty scored)

=== Football League Cup ===
10 August 2010 First round	Southend United	3–2	Bristol City	Southend-on-Sea
19:45	Paterson 31' (pen.), 104'; Corr 88'		McAllister 2'; Sproule 82'	Stadium: Roots Hall; Attendance: 2,940

24 August 2010 Second round	Wolverhampton Wanderers	2–1	Southend United	Wolverhampton
19:45	Milijaš 27' (pen.); Stearman 120'		Easton 80'	Stadium: Molineux; Attendance: 10,284

=== Football League Trophy ===
31 August 2010 First round	Southend United	0–0 (4–3 p)	Gillingham	Southend-on-Sea
19:45				Stadium: Roots Hall; Attendance: 3,073
	Penalties
	Soares (penalty scored); Easton (penalty missed); Barker (penalty scored); Paterson (penalty scored); Grant (penalty missed); Sturrock (penalty scored)		S. Payne (penalty missed); McCammon (penalty scored); Nutter (penalty scored); Maher (penalty scored); Spiller (penalty missed); J. Payne (penalty missed)

5 October 2010 Second round	Barnet	1–3	Southend United	Chipping Barnet
19:45	Vilhete 79'		Paterson 22', 55'; Soares 85'; Bilel (red card) 51'	Stadium: Underhill Stadium; Attendance: 1,356

9 November 2010 Quarter-Final	Southend United	0–1	Charlton Athletic	Southend-on-Sea
19:45			Racon 28'	Stadium: Roots Hall; Attendance: 4,373
