= Ian McLoughlin =

Irish footballer

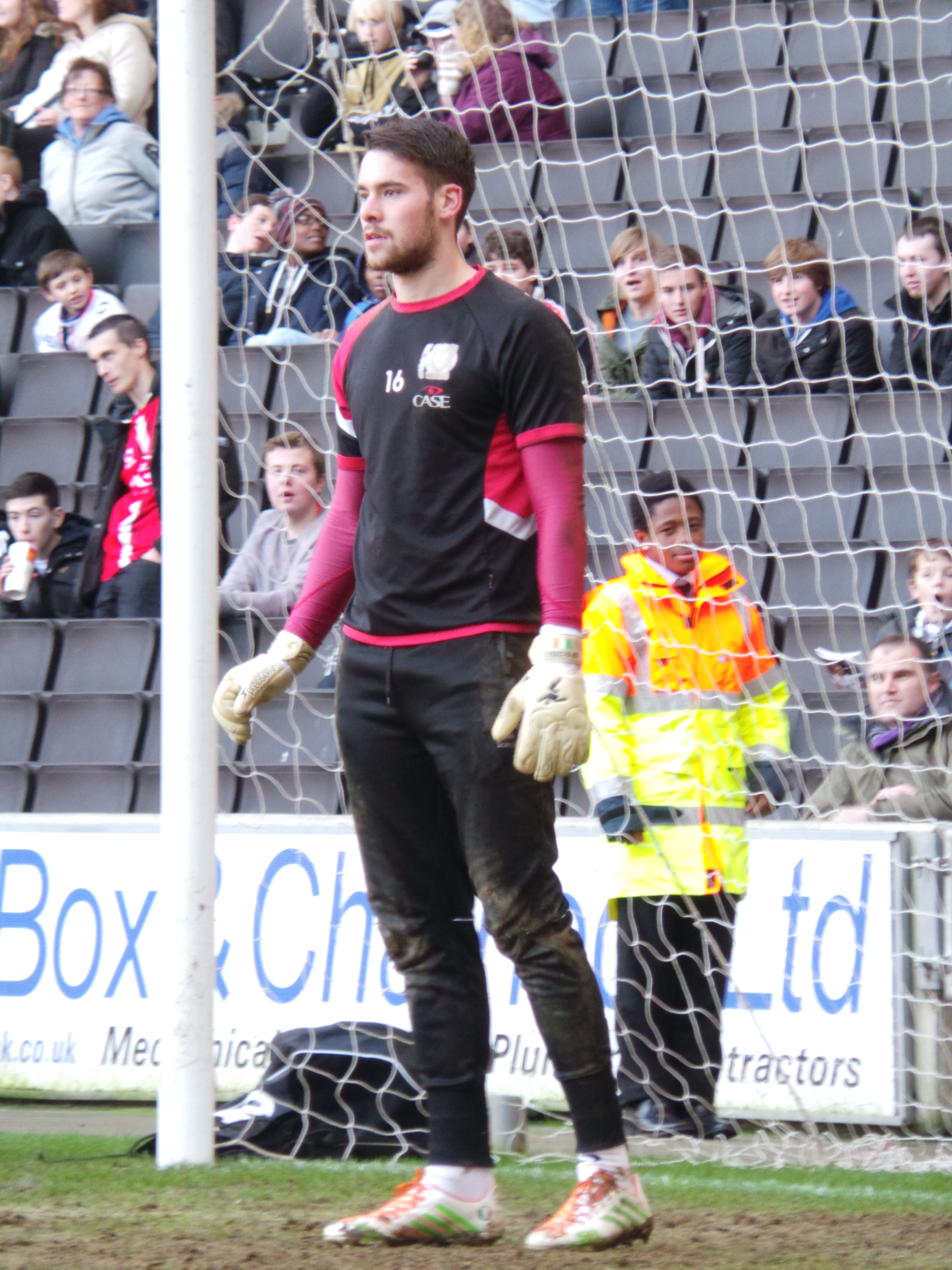
- McLoughlin with Milton Keynes Dons in 2014

Personal information
- Full name: Ian Michael McLoughlin
- Date of birth: 9 August 1991 (age 35)
- Place of birth: Dublin, Ireland
- Height: 6 ft 4 in (1.93 m)
- Position: Goalkeeper

Youth career
- St Francis

Senior career*
Years	Team	Apps	(Gls)
2009–2011	Ipswich Town	0	(0)
2010	→ Lowestoft Town (loan)	2	(0)
2011	→ Stockport County (loan)	5	(0)
2011–2015	Milton Keynes Dons	33	(0)
2013	→ Walsall (loan)	6	(0)
2014	→ Newport County (loan)	12	(0)
2017	Waterford	8	(0)
Total		66	(0)

International career
2009–2010	Republic of Ireland U19		
2011–2012	Republic of Ireland U21	10	(0)
- * Club domestic league appearances and goals

Ian Michael McLoughlin (born 9 August 1991) is an Irish former professional footballer who played as a goalkeeper.

== Club career ==
=== Ipswich Town ===
After impressing coaches on a trial at the start of 2009, McLoughlin signed a one-year contract with Ipswich Town in February. Having been in the reserve team for the year, Mcloughlin signed a one-year extension in the summer of 2010.

==== Lowestoft Town (loan) ====
Mcloughlin signed a 28-day loan deal for Lowestoft Town at the end of October 2010, due to an injury to their first team choice goalkeeper. He made his debut against Chippenham Town in an FA Trophy tie. In that game he failed to keep a clean sheet, the game ending in a 1–1 draw. The replay was on 2 November, and Lowestoft Town won 3–1 to go into the next round.

==== Stockport County (loan) ====
McLoughlin signed for League Two side Stockport County on a month's loan on 25 February 2011, after County's second-choice goalkeeper broke his finger. He made his league debut on 1 March 2011, but was unable to keep a clean sheet as Stockport lost 2–1 to Cheltenham. However, he did enough in that game to be handed his second league appearance the following weekend against Oxford United. He was still unable to prevent the opposition from scoring, but another solid performance helped Stockport to a 2–1 victory – only their second of 2011.

On 12 March 2011, McLoughlin kept the first professional clean sheet of his career, as he helped his bottom-of-the-league side to a creditable 0–0 draw at home to Burton Albion. A second shut-out looked to be on the cards a week later, as the young goalkeeper put in a fine display against Aldershot Town. However, a 94th-minute goal by Damian Spencer sent Stockport to yet another defeat.

County's poor league position was no reflection on the form of McLoughlin, though. He was putting in a consistent run of good performances, and in so doing was keeping the experienced former Hull City and England 'C' keeper, Matt Glennon, out of the side. On 24 March, with McLoughlin's short-term loan deal due to expire, Ipswich manager Paul Jewell allowed him to stay with Stockport until the end of the season, by extending his loan deal.

During McLoughlin's time with Stockport, he discovered that he would be released at the end of the season by his parent club, Ipswich, along with academy scholars Rory McKeown and Josh Meekings. Town manager, Paul Jewell said:

It's the worst part of a manager's job, telling young players that we will not be keeping them on. But the challenge for those boys now is to go on and have a career in the game elsewhere. We will do everything we can to help them achieve that, and wish them all the best for the future.

— Paul Jewell,

=== Milton Keynes Dons ===
In July 2011, McLoughlin and Jay O'Shea signed with League One club Milton Keynes Dons. He made his Dons debut coming off the bench in a second round FA Cup tie against away to Barnet, replacing injured Dons number one David Martin, the Dons won 3–1. His second and final appearance of the season came against Scunthorpe United at Glanford Park in a 3–0 win, coming on as a precautionary substitute again replacing Martin with only seconds left of the match. In the 2012–13 campaign, McLoughlin has played 90 minutes in a 2–0 defeat to Sunderland in the League Cup.

==== Walsall (loan) ====
He signed for Walsall on loan on 13 January 2013, and made his debut the same day in a 3–1 win over Preston North End on the day he signed. He made six appearances during his loan at Walsall.

==== Newport County (loan) ====
On 11 March 2014, McLoughlin joined League Two club Newport County on an emergency loan until 9 April. McLoughlin's loan was then extended until the end of the 2013–14 season.

=== Waterford ===
It was announced on 22 February that McLoughlin would be signing for League of Ireland First Division club Waterford. He made his debut in a 1–0 defeat to Athlone Town on 24 February 2017. McLoughlin suffered a back injury in a 0–0 draw with Longford Town on 1 April which ruled him out until July of the same year. His first involvement back with Waterford was appearing on the bench in the club's 2–1 win against Wexford on 7 July. He made his first start since injury on 11 August in a 3–0 defeat against Shelbourne in the FAI Cup. After Waterford beat Wexford 3-0 and Cobh Ramblers were defeated 3–0 by Cabinteely Waterford were officially crowned league champions and promoted back to the League of Ireland Premier Division. McLoughlin featured in Waterford's last two games of the season, a 1–0 win over Longford Town and the 2–1 defeat to Cobh Ramblers. McLoughlin finished the 2017 season with 9 appearances and 5 clean sheets to his name in an injury hit season.

== International career ==
McLoughlin has been capped by Republic of Ireland under-19s. He made his debut for the national Under-21 team in February 2011, saving a penalty as Ireland drew 0–0 with Cyprus. He followed this up with a second cap in March 2011.

== Career statistics ==
Appearances and goals by club, season and competition
Club	Season	League			FA Cup		League Cup		Other		Total	
Club	Season	Division	Apps	Goals	Apps	Goals	Apps	Goals	Apps	Goals	Apps	Goals
Stockport County (loan)	2010–11	League Two	5	0	0	0	0	0	0	0	5	0
Milton Keynes Dons	2011–12	League One	1	0	1	0	0	0	0	0	2	0
Milton Keynes Dons	2012–13	League One	16	0	0	0	1	0	0	0	17	0
Milton Keynes Dons	2013–14	League One	8	0	2	0	2	0	2 (Note: Appearances in Football League Trophy)	0	14	0
Milton Keynes Dons	2014–15	League One	8	0	0	0	0	0	0	0	8	0
Milton Keynes Dons	Total		33	0	3	0	3	0	2	0	41	0
Walsall (loan)	2012–13	League One	6	0	0	0	0	0	0	0	6	0
Newport County (loan)	2013–14	League Two	12	0	0	0	0	0	0	0	12	0
Waterford	2017	League of Ireland Premier Division	8	0	0	0	0	0	0	0	8	0
Career total			66	0	3	0	3	0	2	0	74	0

== Honours ==
Milton Keynes Dons

- Football League One runner-up: 2014–15

Waterford

- League of Ireland First Division: 2017
