= 2009–10 Southend United F.C. season =

Southend United
2009–2010 season
- Chairman: Ron Martin
- Manager: Steve Tilson
- Stadium: Roots Hall
- League One: 23rd (relegated)
- FA Cup: First round
- League Cup: Second round
- Football League Trophy: Second round
- Average home league attendance: 7,718
Home colours	Away colours

The 2009–10 season was Southend United's 104th season in existence and their third consecutive season in League One. Along with competing in League One, the club also participated in the FA Cup, Football League Cup and Football League Trophy. Southend were relegated from League One, having finished 23rd, whilst they were eliminated from the FA Cup in the first round, and from the League Cup and Football League Trophy in the second. The season covers the period from 1 July 2009 to 30 June 2010.

== First-team squad ==
Players' ages as of 8 May 2010.

No.	Name	Nat	Date of birth (Age)	Place of birth	Signed from	Note
Goalkeepers
1	Steve Mildenhall	(England)	13 May 1978 (aged 31)	Swindon	Yeovil Town	
21	Kelvin Jack	(Trinidad and Tobago)	29 April 1976 (aged 34)	Trincity	Gillingham	
36	Dan Bentley	(England)	13 July 1993 (aged 16)	Basildon	Arsenal	
Defenders
2	Simon Francis	(England)	16 February 1985 (aged 25)	Nottingham	Sheffield United	
3	Scott Malone	(England)	25 March 1991 (aged 19)	Rowley Regis	Wolverhampton Wanderers	On loan from Wolverhampton Wanderers
5	Pat Baldwin	(England)	12 November 1982 (aged 27)	London	Colchester United	On loan from Colchester United
6	Adam Barrett	(England)	29 November 1979 (aged 30)	Dagenham	Bristol Rovers	
15	Osei Sankofa	(England)	19 March 1985 (aged 25)	Streatham	Charlton Athletic	
18	Johnny Herd	(England)	3 October 1989 (aged 20)	Huntingdon	—	
20	Jean-Yves Mvoto	(France)	6 September 1988 (aged 21)	Paris	Sunderland	On loan from Sunderland
Midfielders
4	Jean-François Christophe	(France)	27 June 1987 (aged 22)	Creil	Portsmouth	
7	Anthony Grant	(England)	4 June 1987 (aged 22)	Lambeth	Chelsea	
8	Alan McCormack	(Republic of Ireland)	10 January 1984 (aged 26)	Dublin	Preston North End	
12	Damian Scannell	(England)	28 April 1985 (aged 25)	Croydon	Eastleigh	
14	Franck Moussa	(Belgium)	24 July 1989 (aged 20)	Brussels	West Ham United	
22	Stuart O'Keefe	(England)	4 March 1991 (aged 19)	Eye	—	
26	Francis Laurent	(France)	2 January 1986 (aged 24)	Paris	Mainz 05	
29	Marcus Milner	(Jamaica)	28 November 1991 (aged 18)	Kingston	—	
30	Harry Crawford	(Republic of Ireland)	10 December 1991 (aged 18)	Saffron Walden	—	
32	Alex Woodyard	(England)	3 May 1993 (aged 17)	Gravesend	—	
33	Julian Okai	(England)	26 February 1993 (aged 17)	Southend-on-Sea	—	
34	George Smith	(Republic of Ireland)			—	
Forwards
9	Matt Paterson	(Scotland)	18 October 1989 (aged 20)	Dunfermline	Southampton	
17	Scott Vernon	(England)	13 December 1983 (aged 26)	Manchester	Colchester United	On loan from Colchester United
28	Scott Spencer	(England)	1 January 1989 (aged 21)	Stockport	Rochdale	
31	Kyle Asante	(England)	9 April 1991 (aged 19)	Chelmsford	—	
Players no longer at club
3	John White	(England)	26 July 1986 (aged 23)	Colchester	Colchester United	On loan from Colchester United
5	Matt Heath	(England)	1 November 1981 (aged 28)	Leicester	Colchester United	On loan from Colchester United
17	Roy O'Donovan	(Republic of Ireland)	10 August 1985 (aged 24)	Cork	Sunderland	On loan from Sunderland
23	George Friend	(England)	19 October 1987 (aged 22)	Barnstaple	Wolverhampton Wanderers	On loan from Wolverhampton Wanderers
28	Lee Sawyer	(England)	10 September 1989 (aged 20)	Leytonstone	Chelsea	On loan from Chelsea
17	Jabo Ibehre	(England)	28 January 1983 (aged 27)	Islington	Milton Keynes Dons	On loan from Milton Keynes Dons
11	Alex Revell	(England)	7 July 1983 (aged 26)	Cambridge	Brighton & Hove Albion	On loan at Wycombe Wanderers
5	Sean Morrison	(England)	8 January 1991 (aged 19)	Plymouth	Swindon Town	On loan from Swindon Town
21	Kevin Betsy	(Seychelles)	20 March 1978 (aged 32)	Woking	Bristol City	Betsy joined Wycombe Wanderers in January 2010
9	Lee Barnard	(England)	18 July 1984 (aged 25)	Romford	Tottenham Hotspur	Barnard joined Southampton in January 2010
10	James Walker	(England)	25 November 1987 (aged 22)	Hackney	Charlton Athletic	Walker joined Gillingham in February 2010.
16	Dougie Freedman	(Scotland)	21 January 1974 (aged 36)	Glasgow	Crystal Palace	Freedman retired in March 2010
29	Craig Calver	(England)	20 January 1991 (aged 19)	Cambridge	—	Calver joined A.F.C. Sudbury in March 2010.
24	Ian Joyce	(United States)	12 July 1985 (aged 24)	Kinnelon	Watford	Joyce joined Colorado Rapids in March 2010.
10	Sanchez Watt	(England)	14 February 1991 (aged 19)	Hackney	Arsenal	On loan from Arsenal

== Competitions ==
=== League One ===
==== League table ====
Pos	Team	Pld	W	D	L	GF	GA	GD	Pts	Promotion, qualification or relegation
20	Hartlepool United	46	14	11	21	59	67	−8	50 (Note: Hartlepool deducted 3 points for fielding an ineligible player.)	
21	Gillingham (R)	46	12	14	20	48	64	−16	50	Relegation to Football League Two
22	Wycombe Wanderers (R)	46	10	15	21	56	76	−20	45	Relegation to Football League Two
23	Southend United (R)	46	10	13	23	51	72	−21	43	Relegation to Football League Two
24	Stockport County (R)	46	5	10	31	35	95	−60	25	Relegation to Football League Two

Source: The Football League
Rules for classification: 1) points; 2) goal difference; 3) number of goals scored.
(R) Relegated

==== Matches ====
League One match details
Date	Opponents	Venue	Result	Score F–A	Scorers	Attendance	Ref
8 August 2009	Huddersfield Town	H	D	2–2	Barnard 14' pen., Moussa 56'	8,059	
15 August 2009	Walsall	A	D	2–2	Barnard 66', Freedman 80'	3,658	
18 August 2009	Wycombe Wanderers	A	D	1–1	Christophe 45+3'	4,607	
21 August 2009	Millwall	H	D	0–0		8,435	
29 August 2009	Swindon Town	A	L	1–2	Scannell 80'	6,417	
4 September 2009	Leyton Orient	H	W	3–0	Barnard 59' pen., 78', 90'	8,836	
11 September 2009	Leeds United	H	D	0–0		10,123	
19 September 2009	Brighton & Hove Albion	A	W	3–2	Barnard 8', O'Donovan 27', Laurent 90+1'	6,287	
26 September 2009	Oldham Athletic	H	L	0–1		6,979	
29 September 2009	Brentford	A	L	1–2	Francis 9'	5,578	
3 October 2009	Stockport County	A	W	2–0	Barnard 57' pen., 90+5'	4,102	
9 October 2009	Southampton	H	L	1–3	Friend 27'	8,281	
17 October 2009	Bristol Rovers	H	W	2–1	Barnard 13', 48'	6,853	
24 October 2009	Carlisle United	A	L	1–2	Laurent 42'	4,551	
30 October 2009	Gillingham	H	W	1–0	Barnard 90+3'	7,830	
14 November 2009	Yeovil Town	A	L	0–1		3,906	
20 November 2009	Milton Keynes Dons	H	W	2–1	Wilbraham 24' o.g., Barnard 90+4' pen.	6,957	
24 November 2009	Tranmere Rovers	A	L	0–2		4,317	
1 December 2009	Norwich City	H	L	0–3		8,732	
5 December 2009	Charlton Athletic	A	L	0–1		17,445	
12 December 2009	Hartlepool United	H	W	3–2	Laurent 49', Barnard 56', 74'	7,737	
19 December 2009	Exeter City	A	L	0–1		4,839	
26 December 2009	Colchester United	H	L	1–2	Barnard 76'	10,329	
28 December 2009	Leyton Orient	A	W	2–1	Barrett 59', McCormack 74'	5,680	
16 January 2010	Huddersfield Town	A	L	1–2	Spencer 90'		
23 January 2010	Wycombe Wanderers	H	D	1–1	McCormack 60'	6,675	
26 January 2010	Millwall	A	L	0–2		7,612	
30 January 2010	Swindon Town	H	D	2–2	Spencer 85', Baldwin 89'	6,669	
8 February 2010	Colchester United	A	L	0–2		6,466	
13 February 2010	Tranmere Rovers	H	D	1–1	Vernon 15' pen.	6,382	
20 February 2010	Milton Keynes Dons	A	L	1–3	Paterson 89'	9,801	
23 February 2010	Norwich City	A	L	1–2	Vernon 45+1'	24,824	
26 February 2010	Charlton Athletic	H	L	1–2	Paterson 31'	9,724	
6 March 2010	Hartlepool United	A	L	0–3		3,299	
13 March 2010	Exeter City	H	D	0–0		6,761	
20 March 2010	Carlisle United	H	D	2–2	Moussa 25, Barrett 28'	6,384	
23 March 2010	Walsall	H	W	3–0	Moussa 19', 89', Spencer 51'	6,432	
27 March 2010	Bristol Rovers	A	L	3–4	Vernon 5' pen., 57', Spencer 12'	6,476	
3 April 2010	Yeovil Town	H	D	0–0		6,854	
5 April 2010	Gillingham	A	L	0–3		7,657	
10 April 2010	Leeds United	A	L	0–2		21,650	
13 April 2010	Brentford	H	D	2–2	Laurent 56', 63'	6,838	
17 April 2010	Brighton & Hove Albion	H	L	0–1		8,503	
24 April 2010	Oldham Athletic	A	D	2–2	Laurent 6', Mvoto 75'	4,225	
1 May 2010	Stockport County	H	W	2–1	Crawford 75', McCormack 89'	7,145	
8 May 2010	Southampton	A	L	1–3	Moussa 56'	25,289	

=== FA Cup ===
FA Cup match details
Round	Date	Opponents	Venue	Result	Score F–A	Scorers	Attendance	Ref.
First round	7 November 2009	Gillingham	Away	L	0–3		4,605	

=== Football League Cup ===
League Cup match details
Round	Date	Opponents	Venue	Result	Score F–A	Scorers	Attendance	Ref.
First round	11 August 2009	Cheltenham Town	Away	W	2–1	Barnard 77', 88'	1,918	
Second round	25 August 2009	Hull City	Away	L	1–3	Moussa 45'	7,994	

=== Football League Trophy ===
Football League Trophy match details
Round	Date	Opponents	Venue	Result	Score F–A	Scorers	Attendance	Ref.
Second round	6 October 2009	Milton Keynes Dons	Away	L	0–2		4,792	

== Player statistics ==
=== Appearances and goals ===
No.	Pos	Nat	Player	Total		League One		FA Cup		League Cup		FL Trophy	
No.	Pos	Nat	Player	Apps	Goals	Apps	Goals	Apps	Goals	Apps	Goals	Apps	Goals
1	GK	(England) ENG	Steve Mildenhall	48	0	44	0	1	0	2	0	1	0
2	DF	(England) ENG	Simon Francis	49	1	45	1	1	0	2	0	1	0
3	DF	(England) ENG	John White	6	0	5	0	0	0	1	0	0	0
3	DF	(England) ENG	Scott Malone	17	0	15+2	0	0	0	0	0	0	0
4	MF	(France) FRA	Jean-François Christophe	40	1	31+5	1	1	0	2	0	1	0
5	DF	(England) ENG	Matt Heath	6	0	4	0	0	0	2	0	0	0
5	DF	(England) ENG	Sean Morrison	8	0	8	0	0	0	0	0	0	0
5	DF	(England) ENG	Pat Baldwin	18	1	18	1	0	0	0	0	0	0
6	DF	(England) ENG	Adam Barrett	44	2	41	2	1	0	1	0	1	0
7	MF	(England) ENG	Anthony Grant	41	0	38	0	1	0	2	0	0	0
8	MF	(Republic of Ireland) IRL	Alan McCormack	43	3	40+1	3	0	0	2	0	0	0
9	FW	(England) ENG	Lee Barnard	28	17	25	15	0	0	2	2	1	0
9	FW	(Scotland) SCO	Matt Paterson	16	2	9+7	2	0	0	0	0	0	0
10	FW	(England) ENG	James Walker	16	0	2+11	0	1	0	1+1	0	0	0
10	MF	(England) ENG	Sanchez Watt	4	0	4	0	0	0	0	0	0	0
11	FW	(England) ENG	Alex Revell	5	0	1+2	0	0	0	1+1	0	0	0
12	MF	(England) ENG	Damian Scannell	26	1	15+10	1	0+1	0	0	0	0	0
14	MF	(Belgium) BEL	Franck Moussa	47	6	41+2	5	1	0	2	1	1	0
15	DF	(England) ENG	Osei Sankofa	13	0	10+2	0	0	0	0	0	1	0
16	FW	(Scotland) SCO	Dougie Freedman	23	1	9+11	1	1	0	0+1	0	0+1	0
17	FW	(Republic of Ireland) IRL	Roy O'Donovan	5	1	3+1	1	0	0	0	0	1	0
17	FW	(England) ENG	Jabo Ibehre	4	0	4	0	0	0	0	0	0	0
17	FW	(England) ENG	Scott Vernon	17	4	17	4	0	0	0	0	0	0
18	DF	(England) ENG	Johnny Herd	22	0	17+3	0	1	0	0	0	1	0
20	DF	(France) FRA	Jean-Yves Mvoto	19	1	15+2	1	0	0	2	0	0	0
21	MF	(Seychelles) SEY	Kevin Betsy	3	0	0+2	0	0	0	0+1	0	0	0
21	GK	(Trinidad and Tobago) TRI	Kelvin Jack	0	0	0	0	0	0	0	0	0	0
22	MF	(England) ENG	Stuart O'Keefe	9	0	3+4	0	1	0	0	0	0+1	0
23	DF	(England) ENG	George Friend	6	1	5+1	1	0	0	0	0	0	0
24	GK	(United States) USA	Ian Joyce	2	0	2	0	0	0	0	0	0	0
26	MF	(France) FRA	Francis Laurent	37	6	28+7	6	1	0	0	0	1	0
28	MF	(England) ENG	Lee Sawyer	9	0	0+6	0	0	0	0+2	0	1	0
28	FW	(England) ENG	Scott Spencer	12	0	5+7	0	0	0	0	0	0	0
29	FW	(England) ENG	Craig Calver	0	0	0	0	0	0	0	0	0	0
29	MF	(Jamaica) JAM	Marcus Milner	1	0	0+1	0	0	0	0	0	0	0
30	MF	(Republic of Ireland) IRL	Harry Crawford	7	1	2+5	1	0	0	0	0	0	0
31	FW	(England) ENG	Kyle Asante	1	0	0	0	0+1	0	0	0	0	0
32	MF	(England) ENG	Alex Woodyard	0	0	0	0	0	0	0	0	0	0
33	MF	(England) ENG	Julian Okai	1	0	0	0	0+1	0	0	0	0	0
34	MF	(Republic of Ireland) IRL	George Smith	0	0	0	0	0	0	0	0	0	0
36	GK	(England) ENG	Dan Bentley	0	0	0	0	0	0	0	0	0	0
