= 2008–09 Southend United F.C. season =

Southend United F.C.
2008–09 season
- Manager: Steve Tilson
- Football League One: 8th
- FA Cup: Third round
- League Cup: First round
- Football League Trophy: First round

This article documents the 2008–09 season of Essex football club Southend United F.C.

== League table ==
Pos	Team	Pld	W	D	L	GF	GA	GD	Pts	Promotion or relegation
6	Scunthorpe United (O, P)	46	22	10	14	82	63	+19	76	Qualification for League One play-offs
7	Tranmere Rovers	46	21	11	14	62	49	+13	74	
8	Southend United	46	21	8	17	58	61	−3	71	
9	Huddersfield Town	46	18	14	14	62	65	−3	68	
10	Oldham Athletic	46	16	17	13	66	65	+1	65	

Updated to match(es) played on 2 May 2009. Source: The Football League
Rules for classification: 1) points; 2) goal difference; 3) number of goals scored.
(O) Play-off winners; (P) Promoted

== Results ==
=== League One ===
9 August 2008 1	Southend United	1–0	Peterborough United	Southend
	Clarke 76'			Stadium: Roots Hall; Attendance: 8,665

16 August 2008 2	Millwall	1–1	Southend United	London
	Brkovic 90'		Revell 7'	Stadium: The Den; Attendance: 8,114

22 August 2008 3	Southend United	0–2	Brighton & Hove Albion	Southend
			Murray 74'; Forster 89'	Stadium: Roots Hall; Attendance: 7,976

30 August 2008 4	Walsall	5–2	Southend United	Walsall
	Reich 23'; Grant 48' (o.g.); Demontagnac 50', 69', 84'		Robson-Kanu 33'; Barnard 87'	Stadium: Banks' Stadium; Attendance: 3,843

6 September 2008 5	Carlisle United	2–1	Southend United	Carlisle
	Graham 63' (pen.); Taylor 79'		Freedman 22'	Stadium: Brunton Park; Attendance: 6,561

13 September 2008 6	Southend United	1–0	Hereford United	Southend
	Barnard 29'			Stadium: Roots Hall; Attendance: 6,393

20 September 2008 7	Crewe Alexandra	3–4	Southend United	Crewe
	O'Connor 25'; Pope 42'; Zola 66'		Freedman 4', 69'; Baudet 21' (o.g.); Grant 88'	Stadium: Gresty Road; Attendance: 3,574

26 September 2008 8	Southend United	3–0	Leyton Orient	Southend
	Barnard 1'; Sawyer 12'; Freedman 70'			Stadium: Roots Hall; Attendance: 9,261

4 October 2008 9	Yeovil Town	1–2	Southend United	Yeovil
	Schofield 88'		Barnard 24' (pen.); Robson-Kanu 86'	Stadium: Huish Park; Attendance: 4,008

11 October 2008 10	Southend United	1–1	Stockport County	Southend
	Barnard 19'		McSweeney 64'	Stadium: Roots Hall; Attendance: 7,125

18 October 2008 11	Southend United	2–1	Swindon Town	Southend
	Revell 11'; Laurent 71'		Paynter 60'	Stadium: Roots Hall; Attendance: 7,965

21 October 2008 12	Scunthorpe United	1–1	Southend United	Scunthorpe
	Hayes 79' (pen.)		Barrett 47'	Stadium: Glanford Park; Attendance: 4,324

25 October 2008 13	Bristol Rovers	4–2	Southend United	Bristol
	Lambert 10', 16', 33', 55'		Clarke 70'; Laurent 75'	Stadium: Memorial Stadium; Attendance: 7,055

28 October 2008 14	Southend United	1–0	Leeds United	Southend
	Harding 18'			Stadium: Roots Hall; Attendance: 10,132

1 November 2008 15	Southend United	3–3	Colchester United	Southend
	Clarke 8'; Laurent 13'; Christophe 90'		Jackson 35'; Yeates 71'; Wordsworth 81'	Stadium: Roots Hall; Attendance: 8,920

15 November 2008 16	Tranmere Rovers	2–2	Southend United	Birkenhead
	Thomas-Moore 8'; Savage 14'		Betsy 10'; Revell 35'	Stadium: Prenton Park; Attendance: 5,019

22 November 2008 17	Southend United	1–2	Oldham Athletic	Southend
	Walker 53'		Taylor 67'; Hughes 71'	Stadium: Roots Hall; Attendance: 7,041

25 November 2008 18	Cheltenham Town	0–0	Southend United	Cheltenham
				Stadium: Whaddon Road; Attendance: 2,908

6 December 2008 19	Leicester City	3–0	Southend United	Leicester
	Fryatt 6', 76', 80' (pen.)			Stadium: Walkers Stadium; Attendance: 16,836

13 December 2008 20	Southend United	0–1	Huddersfield Town	Southend
			Craney 48'	Stadium: Roots Hall; Attendance: 8,382

19 December 2008 21	Hartlepool United	3–0	Southend United	Hartlepool
	Kyle 4', 61'; Robson 36'			Stadium: Victoria Park; Attendance: 3,123

26 December 2008 22	Southend United	1–0	Northampton Town	Southend
	Stanislas 90'			Stadium: Roots Hall; Attendance: 7,767

28 December 2008 23	Milton Keynes Dons	2–0	Southend United	Milton Keynes
	O'Hanlon 8'; Baldock 58'			Stadium: Stadium MK; Attendance: 10,432

17 January 2009 24	Stockport County	3–1	Southend United	Stockport
	Pilkington 20', 38'; Rowe 84'		Revell 62'	Stadium: Edgeley Park; Attendance: 5,762

20 January 2009 25	Leyton Orient	1–1	Southend United	London
	Boyd 11'		Walker 90'	Stadium: Matchroom Stadium; Attendance: 3,835

24 January 2009 26	Southend United	0–1	Yeovil Town	Southend
			Brown 6'	Stadium: Roots Hall; Attendance: 6,409

27 January 2009 27	Leeds United	2–0	Southend United	Leeds
	Marques 6'; Naylor 11'			Stadium: Elland Road; Attendance: 20,392

31 January 2009 28	Southend United	1–0	Bristol Rovers	Southend
	Freedman 57'			Stadium: Roots Hall; Attendance: 7,234

14 February 2009 29	Southend United	2–1	Tranmere Rovers	Southend
	Robinson 3'; Betsy 90'		Thomas-Moore 63' (pen.)	Stadium: Roots Hall; Attendance: 6,507

17 February 2009 30	Southend United	0–1	Crewe Alexandra	Southend
			Jones 34'	Stadium: Roots Hall; Attendance: 6,614

21 February 2009 31	Colchester United	0–1	Southend United	Colchester
			Moussa 14'	Stadium: Weston Homes Community Stadium; Attendance: 8,651

24 February 2009 32	Southend United	2–0	Scunthorpe United	Southend
	Robinson 54'; McCormack 87'			Stadium: Roots Hall; Attendance: 6,028

28 February 2009 33	Peterborough United	1–2	Southend United	Peterborough
	Keates 6' (pen.)		Christophe 25'; Blackett 63' (o.g.)	Stadium: London Road; Attendance: 7,341

3 March 2009 34	Southend United	0–1	Millwall	Southend
			Alexander 39'	Stadium: Roots Hall; Attendance: 7,620

7 March 2009 35	Southend United	2–0	Walsall	Southend
	Betsy 50'; Robinson 72'			Stadium: Roots Hall; Attendance: 6,973

10 March 2009 36	Brighton & Hove Albion	1–3	Southend United	Brighton
	Owusu 45'		Barnard 23', 85'; Robinson 89'	Stadium: Withdean Stadium; Attendance: 5,035

14 March 2009 37	Hereford United	0–1	Southend United	Hereford
			Robinson 87' (pen.)	Stadium: Edgar Street; Attendance: 2,663

17 March 2009 38	Swindon Town	3–0	Southend United	Swindon
	Robson-Kanu 13'; Cox 19' (pen.), 90' (pen.)			Stadium: County Ground; Attendance: 6,269

21 March 2009 39	Southend United	3–0	Carlisle United	Southend
	Clarke 14'; Scannell 69'; McCormack 80'			Stadium: Roots Hall; Attendance: 7,789

27 March 2009 40	Southend United	3–2	Hartlepool United	Southend
	Barnard 17' (pen.); Moussa 19'; Robinson 43'		Porter 33' (pen.); Jones 62'	Stadium: Roots Hall; Attendance: 7,227

4 April 2009 41	Huddersfield Town	0–1	Southend United	Huddersfield
			Barnard 63' (pen.)	Stadium: Galpharm Stadium; Attendance: 12,203

10 April 2009 42	Southend United	0–2	Milton Keynes Dons	Southend
			Wright 59', 90'	Stadium: Roots Hall; Attendance: 10,241

13 April 2009 43	Northampton Town	2–3	Southend United	Northampton
	Akinfenwa 50'; Prijović 80'		Christophe 38'; Robinson 56'; Barnard 60'	Stadium: Sixfields; Attendance: 5,190

18 April 2009 44	Southend United	0–2	Leicester City	Southend
			Fryatt 60' (pen.), 70'	Stadium: Roots Hall; Attendance: 10,089

25 April 2009 45	Oldham Athletic	1–1	Southend United	Oldham
	Eardley 51' (pen.)		Barnard 60'	Stadium: Boundary Park; Attendance: 4,830

2 May 2009 46	Southend United	2–0	Cheltenham Town	Southend
	Barrett 54'; Christophe 89'			Stadium: Roots Hall; Attendance: 8,192

=== FA Cup ===
8 November 2008 Round 1	A.F.C. Telford United	2–2	Southend United	Telford
	Adams 70', 83'		Laurent 34'; Christophe 90'	Stadium: New Bucks Head; Attendance: 3,631

18 November 2008 Round 1 Replay	Southend United	2–0	A.F.C. Telford United	Southend
	Francis 74'; Walker 79'			Stadium: Roots Hall; Attendance: 4,415

28 November 2008 Round 2	Southend United	3–1	Luton Town	Southend
	Stanislas 34', 84'; Walker 90'		Spillane 80'	Stadium: Roots Hall; Attendance: 4,111

3 January 2009 Round 3	Chelsea	1–1	Southend United	London
	Kalou 31'		Clarke 90'	Stadium: Stamford Bridge; Attendance: 41,090

14 January 2009 Round 3 Replay	Southend United	1–4	Chelsea	Southend
	Barrett 16'		Ballack 45'; Kalou 60'; Anelka 78'; Lampard 90'	Stadium: Roots Hall; Attendance: 11,314

=== League Cup ===
12 August 2008 Round 1	Southend United	0–1 (a.e.t.)	Cheltenham Town	Southend
			Gill 115'	Stadium: Roots Hall; Attendance: 2,998

=== Football League Trophy ===
12 August 2008 Round 1	Southend United	2–4	Leyton Orient	Southend
	Sawyer 13', 34'		Jarvis 20'; Chambers 25'; Melligan 48'; Boyd 86'	Stadium: Roots Hall; Attendance: 3,499

== Players ==
=== First-team squad ===
Includes all players who were awarded squad numbers during the season.

Note: Flags indicate national team as defined under FIFA eligibility rules; some limited exceptions apply. Players may hold more than one non-FIFA nationality.

No.	Pos.	Nation	Player
1	GK	(England) ENG	Steve Mildenhall
2	DF	(England) ENG	Simon Francis
4	DF	(France) FRA	Dorian Dervite (on loan from Tottenham Hotspur)
5	DF	(England) ENG	Peter Clarke
6	DF	(England) ENG	Adam Barrett
7	MF	(England) ENG	Anthony Grant
8	MF	(Republic of Ireland) IRL	Alan McCormack
9	FW	(England) ENG	Lee Barnard
10	MF	(England) ENG	James Walker
11	FW	(England) ENG	Alex Revell
12	MF	(England) ENG	Damian Scannell
14	MF	(Belgium) BEL	Franck Moussa
15	DF	(England) ENG	Osei Sankofa

No.	Pos.	Nation	Player
16	FW	(England) ENG	Dougie Freedman
17	FW	(England) ENG	Theo Robinson (on loan from Watford)
18	DF	(England) ENG	Johnny Herd
19	FW	(England) ENG	Charles Ademeno
20	MF	(France) FRA	Jean-François Christophe
21	FW	(England) ENG	Kevin Betsy
24	GK	(United States) USA	Ian Joyce
25	GK	(England) ENG	Clark Masters
26	MF	(France) FRA	Francis Laurent
27	MF	(Democratic Republic of the Congo) COD	Peggy Lokando
30	MF	(England) ENG	Stuart O'Keefe
37	MF	(England) ENG	Justin Hazell
41	MF	(England) ENG	Femi Orenuga

=== Left club during season ===
Note: Flags indicate national team as defined under FIFA eligibility rules; some limited exceptions apply. Players may hold more than one non-FIFA nationality.

No.	Pos.	Nation	Player
4	MF	(England) ENG	Nicky Bailey
20	FW	(England) ENG	Matt Harrold
17	MF	(England) ENG	Hal Robson-Kanu
28	MF	(England) ENG	Lee Sawyer (on loan from Chelsea)
32	GK	(Australia) AUS	Adam Federici (on loan from Reading)
34	MF	(England) ENG	Liam Feeney (on loan from Salisbury City)

No.	Pos.	Nation	Player
23	DF	(England) ENG	Dan Harding (on loan from Ipswich Town)
33	DF	(England) ENG	Robert Milsom (on loan from Fulham)
35	MF	(England) ENG	Junior Stanislas (on loan from West Ham United)
22	FW	(Republic of Ireland) IRL	Richie Foran
29	FW	(England) ENG	Paul Furlong
