= Harry Crawford (footballer) =

Irish footballer

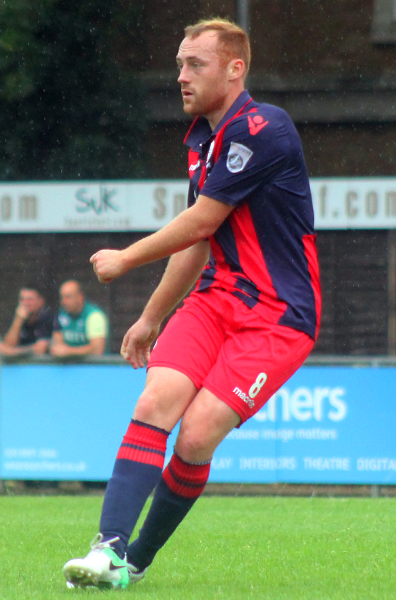
- Crawford playing for Hampton & Richmond Borough in 2017

Personal information
- Full name: Harrison Crawford
- Date of birth: 10 December 1991 (age 34)
- Place of birth: Watford, England
- Position: Forward

Team information
- Current team: Kings Langley

Youth career
- –2010: Southend United

Senior career*
Years	Team	Apps	(Gls)
2010–2012	Southend United	33	(3)
2010	→ Dover Athletic (loan)	2	(1)
2012–2013	Dartford	24	(12)
2013–2014	Barnet	39	(3)
2013	→ Dartford (loan)	2	(1)
2014–2015	Dartford	40	(7)
2015	Boreham Wood	10	(3)
2015–2016	St Albans City	11	(2)
2016	Dover Athletic	6	(0)
2016–2017	Welling United	27	(5)
2017–2019	Hampton & Richmond Borough	32	(1)
2019	→ Bedfont Sports (loan)	3	(2)
2019–	Kings Langley	49	(13)

International career^{‡}
2010	Republic of Ireland U19	2	(0)
- * Club domestic league appearances and goals as of 18:58, 4 September 2021 (UTC) ‡ National team caps and goals as of 23:00, 18 January 2020 (UTC)

Harrison "Harry" Crawford (born 10 December 1991) is an Irish footballer who plays for Spartan South Midlands League Premier Division side Kings Langley, where he plays as a forward.

== Playing career ==
Crawford made his debut on 23 March 2010 for Southend United in their 3–0 home win over Walsall in League One, replacing Scott Spencer in the 82nd minute as a substitute. He got his first assist on 24 April 2010, away to Oldham Athletic when he crossed the ball to Jean-Yves Mvoto who scored with a header. He was given his first start on 1 May against Stockport County where he netted his first goal in professional football, the equaliser in the 75th minute.

Dover Athletic signed Crawford on an initial one-month loan on 26 August. Manager, Martin Hayes said; "Harry has good pedigree. Southend have a good track record of producing good young players and this lad is highly thought of at Roots Hall."

On 18 March 2011, Crawford scored his second and third goals for Southend in a 4–0 victory in a League Two match against Hereford United.

On 18 May 2012, Crawford was one of eleven players to be released at the end of their contract.

On 9 August 2012, Crawford signed for Dartford in the Conference National. He immediately made a good impression on the Darts fans, scoring on his debut against Tamworth. He went on to score 12 goals in his half-season spell at the club, including a hat trick against Alfreton Town and two against local rivals Ebbsfleet United on Boxing Day 2012.

On 24 January 2013, Crawford signed a three-year contract with Barnet. During his second appearance, on 1 February 2013, he scored his first goal for the club, against Bristol Rovers after coming on as a substitute for Ricky Holmes. His goal came on 89 minutes, making the score 1–1, however Barnet went on to lose after conceding in the second minute of added time. Crawford re-joined Dartford on loan on 15 February 2013. Crawford was released by the Bees at the end of the 2013–14 season. He scored three goals in 40 appearances for the Bees.

Crawford re-joined Dartford for a third spell on 29 July 2014. In May 2015, Crawford was released by the club following relegation to the National League South.

In 2015, Crawford played for Boreham Wood and St Albans City before joining Dover Athletic on 27 January 2016.

Crawford joined Welling United for the 2016–17 season. He then joined Hampton & Richmond Borough for 2017–18. Crawford suffered an injury during the season and returned to football in February 2019 when he joined Bedfont Sports, scoring twice on his debut.

He joined Kings Langley for the 2019–20 season.

== International career ==
Despite being born in Watford, he qualifies for the Republic of Ireland through his grandmother who hailed from Dublin, and also through his grandfather. In May 2010, he received his first international call-up to the under-19 squad for the 2010 UEFA European Under-19 Championship elite qualification matches against England, Ukraine and Bosnia and Herzegovina in Kyiv, Ukraine. He made his debut in the 1–0 defeat to England, but was substituted at half-time. He was then an unused substitute for the next match, a 1–0 win over Ukraine. He came on as a substitute for Daniel Kearns in the final group game against Bosnia and Herzegovina, a 1–0 victory as Ireland were eliminated from the competition.

== Career statistics ==
As of match played 4 September 2021

Appearances and goals by club, season and competition
Club	Season	League			FA Cup		League Cup		Other		Total	
Club	Season	Division	Apps	Goals	Apps	Goals	Apps	Goals	Apps	Goals	Apps	Goals
Southend United	2009–10	League One	7	1	0	0	0	0	0	0	7	1
Southend United	2010–11	League Two	23	2	0	0	0	0	1 (Note: Appearance in Football League Trophy)	0	24	2
Southend United	2011–12	League Two	3	0	0	0	0	0	0	0	3	0
Southend United	Total		33	3	0	0	0	0	1	0	34	3
Dover Athletic (loan)	2010–11	Conference South	2	1	0	0	—		0	0	2	1
Dartford	2012–13	Conference Premier	24	12	2	1	—		3 (Note: Two appearances and two goals in FA Trophy, one in Kent Senior Cup)	2	29	15
Barnet	2012–13	League Two	10	1	0	0	0	0	0	0	10	1
Barnet	2013–14	Conference Premier	29	2	1	0	—		0	0	30	2
Barnet	Total		39	3	1	0	0	0	0	0	40	3
Dartford (loan)	2012–13	Conference Premier	2	1	0	0	—		2 (Note: Appearance(s) in FA Trophy)	0	4	1
Dartford	2014–15	Conference Premier	40	7	2	2	—		3	1	45	10
Boreham Wood	2015–16	National League	10	3	0	0	—		0	0	10	3
St Albans City	2015–16	National League South	11	2	2	0	—		0	0	13	2
Dover Athletic	2015–16	National League	6	0	0	0	—		0	0	6	0
Welling United	2016–17	National League South	27	5	3	0	—		0	0	30	5
Hampton & Richmond Borough	2017–18	National League South	24	1	3	0	—		3	0	30	1
Hampton & Richmond Borough	2018–19	National League South	8	0	0	0	—		0	0	8	0
Hampton & Richmond Borough	Total		32	1	3	0	0	0	3	0	38	1
Bedfont Sports (loan)	2018–19	Isthmian League South Central	3	2	0	0	—		0	0	3	2
Kings Langley	2019–20	SFL Premier Division Central	17	6	4	0	—		3 (Note: Two appearances in Southern League Cup, one appearance in Herts Senior Cup)	0	24	6
Kings Langley	2020–21	SFL Premier Division Central	8	2	2	0	—		2	0	12	2
Kings Langley	2021–22	SFL Premier Division Central	0	0	1	2	—		0	0	1	2
Kings Langley	Total		25	8	7	2	0	0	5	0	37	10
Career total			254	48	20	5	0	0	17	3	290	56
