= Okai =

Okai is a surname. Notable people with the surname include:

- Atukwei Okai (1941–2018), Ghanaian poet and academic
- Chisato Okai (岡井 千聖, born 1994), Japanese singer, actress, model and television personality
- Jason M. Okai (born 1970), American attorney, educator, artist
- Julian Okai (born 1993), English footballer
- Lawrence Okai (1934–2017), Ghanaian military officer
- Nii Okai (born 1977), Ghanaian singer
- Samuel Okai (born 1936), Ghanaian footballer
- Sheila Okai (born 1979), Ghanaian women's footballer
- Stephen Okai (born 1989), Ghanaian footballer
- Edmund Okai (Ghanaian Sports Journalist)
