= Franck Moussa =

Belgian footballer (born 1989)

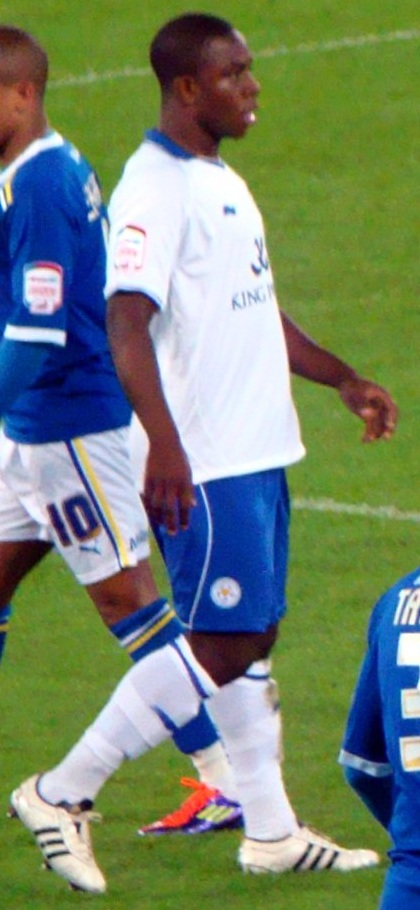
- Moussa playing for Leicester City in 2011

Personal information
- Full name: Franck Moussa
- Date of birth: 24 July 1989 (age 37)
- Place of birth: Brussels, Belgium
- Height: 1.73 m (5 ft 8 in)
- Position: Midfielder

Youth career
- 1999–2004: Anderlecht
- 2004–2006: West Ham United

Senior career*
Years	Team	Apps	(Gls)
2006–2010	Southend United	90	(7)
2008	→ Wycombe Wanderers (loan)	9	(0)
2010–2012	Leicester City	8	(1)
2011	→ Doncaster Rovers (loan)	14	(2)
2012	→ Chesterfield (loan)	10	(4)
2012–2014	Coventry City	77	(18)
2014–2016	Charlton Athletic	20	(1)
2016	Southend United	1	(1)
2016–2017	Walsall	22	(4)
2018	Gillingham	2	(0)
Total		253	(38)

International career
2006–2007	Belgium U18	10	(1)
2007	Belgium U19	4	(1)
- * Club domestic league appearances and goals

Franck Moussa (born 24 July 1989) is a Belgian former professional footballer.

== Career ==
=== Southend United ===
Born in Brussels, Moussa was a Belgian under-18 and under-19 international. He made his Southend United first team debut as a 16-year-old in the final minutes of the 3–0 win over Colchester United on 4 March 2006, coming on for midfielder Luke Guttridge. He was also part of the squad that saw Southend gain promotion to the Championship in the 2–2 draw away at Swansea City.

He joined Wycombe Wanderers on a two-month loan on 16 October 2008 and made nine League Two appearances.

Moussa returned to Southend on 23 December. He was named on the bench for Southend's FA Cup third-round game against Chelsea at Stamford Bridge and replaced Jean-François Christophe in the 74th minute. Southend drew the game 1–1 when Peter Clarke equalised in injury time.

Moussa scored his first professional goal on 21 February 2009 against Colchester after running half the length of the pitch to volley in Theo Robinson's cross. The goal proved to be the match winner of the Essex derby.

=== Leicester City ===
Moussa chose not to remain at Southend after their relegation to League Two, and on 13 August 2010 he signed for Leicester City on a two-year contract. He scored his first goal for Leicester in their 3–1 victory over Scunthorpe United on 2 October 2010.

On 19 February 2011 Moussa joined Doncaster Rovers on a one-month emergency loan deal. He made his debut the same day against Swansea City. Moussa scored his first Doncaster goal against Leeds United on 5 March 2011. The loan deal was extended by a month on 23 March 2011. He joined League One side Chesterfield on loan until the end of the 2011–12 season on 16 March 2012.

On 30 May 2012, Leicester City reached a mutual agreement with Moussa for the cancellation of his contract.

=== Coventry City ===
On 21 September 2012, Moussa signed a short-term contract with Coventry City and made first appearance against Arsenal in the League Cup. He scored his first goal for the Sky Blues on 17 November 2012 against Hartlepool United in a 5–0 win. On 3 January 2013, he signed an 18-month contract after impressing on his short-term deal. His first season with the Sky Blues was capped off by winning the 'Fans Goal of the Season' award for his solo effort against MK Dons. Moussa made his 50th appearance for the Sky Blues during the 4–0 win against Carlisle United where he scored another solo effort. Moussa's contract ran up to 30 June 2014.

His penchant for scoring great goals has continued throughout 2013 with strikes against Port Vale, Leyton Orient and Preston. His goal against Leyton Orient won the Football League's goal of the season.

=== Charlton Athletic ===
Moussa signed for Charlton Athletic on 2 July 2014 on a two-year deal on a free transfer. He scored his first goal for the club when he struck a dramatic late winner against Wigan Athletic on 16 August 2014. On 1 February 2016, his contract was terminated by mutual consent after an injury hit time at the south east London-based club.

=== Return to Southend United ===
Moussa returned to Southend United on 28 March 2016, signing on non-contract terms until the rest of the season.

=== Walsall ===
On 11 July 2016, Moussa signed for Walsall on a one-year contract with an option for a further year. At the end of the 2016–17 season, Moussa was released by Walsall.

=== Gillingham ===
Having been without a club since leaving Walsall in the summer of 2017, on 23 January 2018 Moussa signed for League One side Gillingham on a contract until the end of the season. He made his debut for the club as a 72nd-minute substitute in a 2–0 league loss to Wigan Athletic. Moussa was released at the end of the 2017–18 season having made just two appearances for the Kent side.

== Personal life ==
Born in Belgium, Moussa is of Congolese descent. After retiring due to a knee injury aged just 30, Moussa went on to work for NatWest bank.

== Career statistics ==
As of match played 7 April 2018

Appearances and goals by club, season and competition
Club	Season	League			FA Cup		League Cup		Other		Total	
Club	Season	Division	Apps	Goals	Apps	Goals	Apps	Goals	Apps	Goals	Apps	Goals
Southend United	2005–06	League One	1	0	0	0	0	0	0	0	1	0
Southend United	2006–07	Championship	4	0	0	0	0	0	—		4	0
Southend United	2007–08	League One	16	0	2	0	3	0	1 (Note: Appearance in League One play-offs)	0	22	0
Southend United	2008–09	League One	26	2	2	0	1	0	0	0	29	2
Southend United	2009–10	League One	43	5	1	0	2	1	1 (Note: Appearance(s) in Football League Trophy)	0	47	6
Southend United	Total		90	7	5	0	6	1	2	0	103	8
Wycombe Wanderers (loan)	2008–09	League Two	9	0	—		—		—		9	0
Leicester City	2010–11	Championship	8	1	1	0	3	0	—		12	1
Leicester City	2011–12	Championship	0	0	0	0	3	0	—		3	0
Leicester City	Total		8	1	1	0	6	0	—		15	1
Doncaster Rovers (loan)	2010–11	Championship	14	2	—		—		—		14	2
Chesterfield (loan)	2011–12	League One	10	4	—		—		1	0	11	4
Coventry City	2012–13	League One	38	6	3	0	1	0	4	0	46	6
Coventry City	2013–14	League One	39	12	5	1	1	1	1	0	46	14
Coventry City	Total		77	18	8	1	2	1	5	0	92	20
Charlton Athletic	2014–15	Championship	14	1	0	0	2	0	—		16	1
Charlton Athletic	2015–16	Championship	6	0	1	0	0	0	—		7	0
Charlton Athletic	Total		20	1	1	0	2	0	—		23	1
Southend United	2015–16	League One	1	1	—		—		—		1	1
Walsall	2016–17	League One	22	4	1	0	0	0	3 (Note: Appearances in EFL Trophy)	0	26	4
Gillingham	2017–18	League One	2	0	0	0	0	0	0	0	2	0
Career total			253	38	16	1	16	2	11	0	296	41

== Honours ==
Chesterfield

- Football League Trophy: 2011–12
