= Marcus Milner =

Marcus Milner may refer to:

- Marcus Milner (footballer) (born 1991), Jamaican footballer
- Marcus Milner (cricketer) (1864–1939), English racehorse trainer, soldier and cricketer
