= Anthony Grant (footballer, born 1987) =

English footballer

Personal information
- Full name: Anthony Paul Shaun Andrew Daure Grant
- Date of birth: 4 June 1987 (age 39)
- Place of birth: Lambeth, England
- Height: 5 ft 10 in (1.78 m)
- Position: Midfielder

Team information
- Current team: AFC Whyteleafe

Youth career
- 2000–2004: Chelsea

Senior career*
Years	Team	Apps	(Gls)
2004–2008	Chelsea	1	(0)
2006	→ Oldham Athletic (loan)	2	(0)
2006–2007	→ Wycombe Wanderers (loan)	40	(0)
2007–2008	→ Luton Town (loan)	4	(0)
2008	→ Southend United (loan)	10	(0)
2008–2012	Southend United	149	(10)
2012–2013	Stevenage	41	(0)
2013–2015	Crewe Alexandra	81	(4)
2015–2017	Port Vale	58	(1)
2017–2018	Peterborough United	49	(0)
2018–2020	Shrewsbury Town	42	(0)
2019–2020	→ Swindon Town (loan)	20	(0)
2020–2022	Swindon Town	48	(3)
2022	Scunthorpe United	13	(0)
2023	Crawley Town	11	(0)
2023–2025	Welling United	52	(2)
2025	Ramsgate	5	(0)
2025	→ AFC Whyteleafe (loan)	5	(0)
2025–	AFC Whyteleafe	14	(0)

International career
2002–2003	England U16	1	(0)
2003–2004	England U17	2	(0)
2005–2006	England U19	2	(0)
2021	Jamaica	6	(0)
- * Club domestic league appearances and goals as of 19:36, 26 April 2026 (UTC)

Anthony Paul Shaun Andrew Daure Grant (born 4 June 1987) is a professional footballer who plays as a midfielder for Isthmian League Premier Division club AFC Whyteleafe. Born and raised in England, he represented the Jamaica national team.

Grant began his career at Chelsea, progressing through the youth team ranks before making his first-team debut in 2005. Grant was loaned out four times during his time at Chelsea, briefly playing for Oldham Athletic in 2006, before spending the 2006–07 season at Wycombe Wanderers. He then joined Luton Town on loan in November 2007, spending a month with the club. Grant later joined Southend United in January 2008 on loan until the end of the 2007–08 campaign. He signed for Southend permanently before the 2008–09 season and spent four seasons with the club. In June 2012, Grant signed for Stevenage on a free transfer. After one season at Stevenage, Grant joined Crewe Alexandra. He remained with Crewe for two years and moved on to Port Vale in June 2015. He was voted Port Vale's Player of the Year in 2015–16 before being sold to Peterborough United in January 2017.

He was bought by Shrewsbury Town in August 2018 and signed with Swindon Town in January 2020 following a loan spell. Swindon went on to win the League Two title at the end of the 2019–20 season, and Grant was named the club's Player of the Season, though the club were relegated the following season. He joined Scunthorpe United on a free transfer in January 2022 and then signed with Crawley Town in March 2023. He moved into non-League football with Welling United in November 2023 and then Ramsgate in July 2025. He subsequently joined AFC Whyteleafe.

== Club career ==
=== Chelsea ===
Born in Lambeth, Greater London, Grant began his career at Chelsea as a trainee, progressing through the youth team ranks and later becoming a regular for the reserve side. In May 2005, Grant made his professional debut for the club, coming on as a 90th-minute substitute for Joe Cole in Chelsea's 3–1 win over Manchester United at Old Trafford. Due to Grant's impressive performances for the reserve team, he was named in the first-team squad for the 2005–06 season, for which he had been allocated the squad number 42. However, he made no first-team appearances for Chelsea during the campaign. In January 2006, Grant was loaned to League One club Oldham Athletic, signing for the club on a one-month loan deal. He made his debut for Oldham a day after signing, playing the whole match in a 3–0 away defeat against Nottingham Forest. He went on to make just one further appearance during his brief loan spell, playing the first 67 minutes in a 2–0 victory against Gillingham at Boundary Park. He returned to his parent club in early February 2006 and featured regularly for Chelsea's reserves for the remainder of the season.

Ahead of the 2006–07 season, Grant joined League Two side Wycombe Wanderers on a season-long loan. Wycombe manager Paul Lambert had previously tried to sign Grant during his time at Livingston a year earlier. However, no transfer materialised due to the distance Grant would have to travel to play for the club. He made his Wycombe debut on the first day of the season, playing 69 minutes in a 1–1 home draw with Wrexham. A week later, on 12 August 2006, he was sent off for the first time in his career in a 1–0 defeat to Notts County, receiving the red card for two bookable offences. Grant also helped Wycombe reach the semi-final of the League Cup, playing in all five games up until the semi-final, but was unable to take part in the two-legged semi-final as Wycombe were drawn against Grant's employers, Chelsea. He was almost ever-present during the campaign, making 49 appearances as Wycombe finished the season in 12th place. He was offered a contract extension at Chelsea in March 2007, and signed the deal on returning to the club at the end of the campaign. In November 2007, Grant was loaned out, this time joining Luton Town until January 2008. He made his debut in a 1–0 victory over Southend United, coming on as a second-half substitute. Grant's first four appearances for Luton were as a late substitute. He started his first match for the club in a match against Bristol Rovers on 26 December 2007 but was one of three players to be sent off for Luton in a game that saw them draw 1–1, despite Bristol Rovers' numerical advantage. Grant was given an immediate three-game ban, which put an abrupt end to his loan spell; the club were in administration and under a transfer embargo, so were unable to renew the loan.

=== Southend United ===
In January 2008, Grant went out on loan for a fourth time, joining Southend United of League One on loan for the remainder of the 2007–08 season. He made his debut as a 78th-minute substitute in Southend's 2–1 home win over AFC Bournemouth on 16 February 2008. He made ten appearances for the club during the campaign, all as a substitute. In July 2008, Southend manager Steve Tilson stated he was interested in signing Grant permanently after he was made available for transfer by Chelsea. He subsequently trained with the club during pre-season and played in a number of the club's pre-season friendlies. Two days before the start of the 2008–09 season, on 7 August 2008, Grant signed for Southend on a free transfer. He featured in the club's first game of the new season, coming on as a late substitute as Southend got off to a winning start after beating Peterborough United. Grant started his first game for the club three days later in a 1–0 extra time defeat to Cheltenham Town in the League Cup. He scored his first ever professional goal in September 2008, coming off the bench to score an 88th-minute winner as Southend beat Crewe Alexandra 4–3. Grant made 42 appearances during his first full season with the Essex club, scoring once, as Southend finished five points short of a play-off place in League One.

Grant was offered a new contract by Southend in October 2009, and shortly after signed a 2 1/2-year contract extension, keeping him at the club until 2012. He suffered an ankle injury following Southend's 2–2 draw against Swindon Town in February 2010 and subsequently missed two months of the season. He made 41 appearances during the 2009–10 campaign, in a season that witnessed Southend suffer relegation back to League Two following financial difficulties. Despite the club's relegation, he remained at Southend for the 2010–11 season, with Southend under new management in the form of Paul Sturrock. Grant ended his 79-game goal drought shortly into the new campaign when he scored a 25 yards (23 m) strike in a 2–0 away victory against Bradford City. A week later, he doubled his goal tally for the season when he "stroked home" Ryan Hall's inswinging corner in a 2–1 home victory over Torquay United, thus ending Torquay's winning start to the season. He went on to score in the club's next two matches: a 2–1 defeat to Northampton Town, and a 35 yards (32 m) strike in the club's 3–2 home loss to Morecambe, consequently taking his tally to four goals in as many matches. Grant soon scored his fifth of the campaign, scoring a low-driven effort in an away defeat to Chesterfield on 9 October 2010. He also netted in a 1–1 draw with Shrewsbury Town at the New Meadow a month later, scoring a "stunning volley" late-on to rescue a point for Southend. As a result of Grant's impressive form during the first half of the season, he attracted interest from some Championship clubs, but later issued a statement stating his intention to see out the remainder of his contract at Southend. He scored two further goals during the season, finishing "calmly" from inside the area in a 2–0 win against Barnet in January 2011, and netting against Wycombe Wanderers on the last day of the season. He ended the season having scored eight goals in 51 appearances, with Southend finishing in mid-table.

Ahead of the 2011–12 season, it was again reported that Grant would be leaving Southend in favour of a move to a Championship club, although ultimately no move materialised. He made 41 appearances during the season, scoring once, a long-range volley in a 2–0 home win over AFC Wimbledon in April 2012, as Southend narrowly lost in the League Two play-off semi-final. During his four years at Southend, Grant made 184 appearances and scored ten goals.

=== Stevenage ===
In June 2012, Grant rejected the offer of a contract extension at Southend, and opted to sign for League One side Stevenage on a free transfer. He made his debut for the club in a 3–1 win over AFC Wimbledon in the League Cup on 14 August 2012, in Stevenage's first game of the 2012–13 season. Grant made 45 appearances in all competitions during his first season with Stevenage, as the club finished the season in 18th place in League One. He was placed on the transfer list in May 2013. With Grant entering the final year of his contract at Stevenage, new manager Graham Westley felt he would not play as much as he would have liked, and therefore it was "better for all" that Grant "move on to develop his career".

=== Crewe Alexandra ===
Having not returned to pre-season with Stevenage ahead of the 2013–14 season, Grant signed for divisional rivals Crewe Alexandra in July 2013, joining on a two-year contract. He signed for Crewe on a free transfer, having been released from his contract at Stevenage by mutual consent. In November 2013, Crewe manager Steve Davis made Grant and fellow midfielder Brad Inman available on loan because he was unhappy with their attitude: "Their attitude has got to be better, for the moment, for the benefit of the squad, they're better not around it." He remained at Gresty Road however, and went on to divide opinion with "Railwaymen" supporters, some welcoming his physical approach and ability to break up play whilst others criticised him for slowing down the play of Crewe's otherwise highly technical midfield.

Despite featuring 48 times in the 2014–15 season, he was not offered an extension to his contract as the coaching staff were not convinced he represented "value for money". He was voted second in the club's Player of the Year award behind goalkeeper Ben Garratt.

=== Port Vale ===
Grant remained in League One after leaving Crewe and signed a two-year contract with nearby rivals Port Vale in June 2015. He started the 2015–16 season in good form and was described by local press as the club's outstanding player during Vale's unbeaten run of six games to open the campaign, whilst captain Carl Dickinson said that "I can't see why he isn't playing higher". However, his combative style of play left his with ten yellow cards before the new year, and as a result he was suspended for two games. He went on to collect 15 bookings and so was suspended for the final three matches of the campaign. Despite such disciplinary problems he was voted the club's Player of the season.

He submitted a transfer request in July 2016. After Rob Page switched from manager of Port Vale to Northampton Town he put in a bid for Grant that Vale chairman Norman Smurthwaite dismissed as "pathetic", saying "it wasn't enough to fuel my car for a year". New Vale manager Bruno Ribeiro then appointed Grant as joint-captain, along with Ben Purkiss and Ben Purkiss. His performance on the opening day of the 2016–17 season – a 0–0 draw with Bradford City – saw him named in the Football League Paper's League One Team of the Day. He was again named in the Team of the Day for his performance in a 2–1 win over Gillingham on 17 September. However, he was sent off for two bookable offences in a 2–1 home win over Fleetwood Town on 12 November, and was suspended for a total of six games and fined £2,000 after he returned to the field after the match to argue with the referee on the full-time whistle. Vale won just two league points and one FA Cup game during his suspension. The club reportedly turned down a transfer bid of £50,000 for the player in the January transfer window.

=== Peterborough United ===
Grant joined Port Vale's League One rivals Peterborough United for an undisclosed "six-figure fee" on 31 January 2017 and signed a two-and-a-half-year contract. He said he was attracted to the club by manager Grant McCann's attacking style of football. He made his "Posh" debut in a 3–0 win at former club Port Vale on 4 February, and was described as "excellent" by assistant manager Lee Glover. He played 11 games for the club in the second half of the 2016–17 season, helping United to an 11th-place finish.

He picked up four yellow cards in his first six appearances of the 2017–18 season before he was sent off for deliberate handball in the closing stages of a 3–1 defeat by Bradford City at London Road Stadium on 9 September. Speaking in March 2018, new manager Steve Evans told the press that "I had a long chat with Anthony Grant the other day regarding my need for him to pass the ball on quickly and he will come again". However, he transfer-listed him two months later and said that "I want a two-man midfield [and he] is better suited to being one of three midfielders".

=== Shrewsbury Town ===
On 2 August 2018, Grant signed for League One side Shrewsbury Town for an undisclosed fee on a one-year deal, with the option of a further year. Manager John Askey said that he hoped Grant would become one of the "Shrews" best players, filling the gap left by departed skipper Abu Ogogo. He indeed went on to quickly become a fan's favourite at the New Meadow, though warned that new manager Sam Ricketts and chairman Roland Wycherley should try and sign him to a new deal before his head was turned by another club. However, he featured 48 times during the 2018–19 season and triggered a one-year contract extension. Grant was forced to train with the youth team in July 2019 for what Ricketts said was "due to reasons which will remain in house".

=== Swindon Town ===
On 2 September 2019, he joined League Two side Swindon Town on a four-month loan deal. Grant made his "Robins" debut against Leyton Orient on 7 September, replacing the injured Jordan Lyden in the first half of a 3–1 win. He made his full league debut in a 3–0 win over Macclesfield Town seven days later. On 6 January 2020, Grant made his loan move a permanent deal, signing for the "Robins" until the end of the 2019–20 season. During the mid-season break in play during the COVID-19 pandemic in England, Grant was named in three regional football journalist's "League Two team of the season (so far)". League Two clubs went on to vote to end the campaign early and promote Swindon as champions. Grant was named as the club's Player of the Season after polling 50% of the online vote, though had to receive the award via Zoom due to the pandemic.

Grant was linked with a move to Blackpool in the summer of 2020 but ended up signing a one-year extension with Swindon. However, he struggled for form in the 2020–21 season after playing through a niggling ankle injury. Manager Richie Wellens was replaced by John Sheridan in November and Grant reportedly fell out with the new manager. However, Sheridan denied the rumours in the press. Sheridan asked Grant to play at centre-back in March, much to the midfielder's surprise. Grant ended the season with three goals in 37 games as Swindon were relegated after finishing second-from-bottom in League One. On 14 May 2021, it was announced that he would leave Swindon at the end of the season, following the expiry of his contract. However, he reported back to the club for pre-season training as new head coach Ben Garner weighed up the possibility of offering him a new deal. On 5 August, Grant re-signed for Swindon Town on a one-year contract extension. On 28 January 2022, Grant had his contract terminated by mutual consent, with the club reporting that "it was decided that a fresh start was needed for both parties".

=== Scunthorpe United ===
On 29 January 2022, Grant joined struggling League Two side Scunthorpe United on a free transfer. He was sent off on 15 March for a late challenge on Barrow's Josh Gordon in a damaging 1–0 defeat at Glanford Park. He was released by manager Keith Hill at the end of the 2021–22 season as the "Iron" were relegated to the National League.

=== Crawley Town ===
On 23 March 2023, Grant signed for struggling League Two side Crawley Town on a contract until the end of the 2022–23 season. He made two starts and eight substitute appearances before being released upon the expiry of his contract. On 3 August, Grant re-signed with Crawley Town on a short-term contract. Manager Scott Lindsey said that "Granty was a key player for us at the end of last season, [however] we weren't in a position to offer him a contract at that time, but I wanted to make sure that I invited him back for pre-season".

=== Welling United ===
On 25 November 2023, Grant signed for National League South club Welling United, who named him as captain in their starting line-up in a 4–1 win against league leaders Yeovil Town. He scored two goals in 29 games throughout the 2023–24 campaign. Welling ended the season in 17th place with the most draws in the division. He played 27 matches in the 2024–25 season, which ended in relegation.

=== Ramsgate ===
On 4 July 2025, Grant joined newly promoted Isthmian League Premier Division side Ramsgate.

=== AFC Whyteleafe ===
In order to gain match fitness following his return from a calf injury, Grant joined Isthmian League South East Division club AFC Whyteleafe on loan in September 2025. Having impressed in his first month with the club, he made the move permanent on 13 October.

== International career ==
Grant has represented England at under-16, under-17 and under-19 youth international level. In August 2021, Grant received his first call-up to the Jamaica national team for 2022 FIFA World Cup qualifier for games against Mexico, Panama and Costa Rica. He made his debut in a 2–1 defeat to Mexico at the Estadio Azteca on 2 September.

== Style of play ==
Grant is a central midfielder specialising in breaking up opposition play and is adept at receiving the ball from defenders and supplying the ball to more attack-minded players. He has been described as 'combative', and regularly picks up bookings.

== Career statistics ==
=== Club statistics ===
As of match played 24 January 2026

Appearances and goals by club, season and competition
Club	Season	League			FA Cup		League Cup		Other		Total	
Club	Season	Division	Apps	Goals	Apps	Goals	Apps	Goals	Apps	Goals	Apps	Goals
Chelsea	2004–05	Premier League	1	0	0	0	0	0	0	0	1	0
Oldham Athletic (loan)	2005–06	League One	2	0	—		—		—		2	0
Wycombe Wanderers (loan)	2006–07	League Two	40	0	2	0	5	0	2 (Note: Appearances in Football League Trophy)	0	49	0
Luton Town (loan)	2007–08	League Two	4	0	1	0	—		—		5	0
Southend United (loan)	2007–08	League One	10	0	—		—		0	0	10	0
Southend United	2008–09	League One	35	1	5	0	1	0	1	0	42	1
Southend United	2009–10	League One	38	0	1	0	2	0	0	0	41	0
Southend United	2010–11	League Two	43	8	2	0	2	0	3	0	50	8
Southend United	2011–12	League Two	33	1	1	0	1	0	6 (Note: Four appearances in Football League Trophy; two appearances in League Two play-offs)	0	41	1
Southend United	Total		149	10	9	0	6	0	10	0	174	10
Stevenage	2012–13	League One	41	0	1	0	2	0	1	0	45	0
Crewe Alexandra	2013–14	League One	38	2	2	1	1	0	2	0	43	3
Crewe Alexandra	2014–15	League One	43	2	2	0	2	0	1	0	48	2
Crewe Alexandra	Total		81	4	4	1	3	0	3	0	91	5
Port Vale	2015–16	League One	38	1	3	0	2	0	2	1	45	2
Port Vale	2016–17	League One	20	0	2	0	1	1	1 (Note: Appearances in EFL Trophy)	0	24	1
Port Vale	Total		58	1	5	0	3	1	3	1	69	3
Peterborough United	2016–17	League One	11	0	—		—		—		11	0
Peterborough United	2017–18	League One	38	0	6	0	0	0	4	0	48	0
Peterborough United	Total		49	0	6	0	0	0	4	0	59	0
Shrewsbury Town	2018–19	League One	42	0	6	0	0	0	0	0	48	0
Shrewsbury Town	2019–20	League One	0	0	0	0	0	0	0	0	0	0
Shrewsbury Town	Total		42	0	6	0	0	0	0	0	48	0
Swindon Town (loan)	2019–20	League One	20	0	0	0	—		0	0	20	0
Swindon Town	2019–20	League Two	10	0	0	0	0	0	0	0	10	0
Swindon Town	2020–21	League One	33	3	1	0	1	0	2	0	37	3
Swindon Town	2021–22	League Two	5	0	0	0	1	0	1	0	7	0
Swindon Town	Total		68	3	1	0	2	0	3	0	74	3
Scunthorpe United	2021–22	League Two	13	0	—		—		—		13	0
Crawley Town	2022–23	League Two	10	0	—		—		—		10	0
Crawley Town	2023–24	League Two	1	0	0	0	0	0	0	0	1	0
Crawley Town	Total		11	0	0	0	0	0	0	0	11	0
Welling United	2023–24	National League South	26	2	0	0	—		3 (Note: Appearances in FA Trophy)	0	29	2
Welling United	2024–25	National League South	26	0	0	0	—		1	0	27	0
Welling United	Total		52	2	0	0	0	0	4	0	56	2
Ramsgate	2025–26	Isthmian League; Premier Division	5	0	0	0	—		1 (Note: Appearance(s) in Kent Senior Cup)	0	6	0
AFC Whyteleafe	2025–26	Isthmian League; South East Division	19	0	0	0	—		3 (Note: 2 appearances in the Surrey Senior Cup and 1 appearance in the Velocity Cup)	0	22	0
AFC Whyteleafe	2026–27	Isthmian League; Premier Division	0	0	0	0	—		0	0	0	0
AFC Whyteleafe	Total		19	0	0	0	0	0	3	0	22	0
Career total			651	20	35	1	21	1	34	1	742	23

=== International statistics ===
As of match played on 8 September 2021

Appearances and goals by national team and year
National team	Year	Apps	Goals
Jamaica	2021	6	0
Total		6	0

== Honours ==
Swindon Town

- EFL League Two: 2019–20

Individual

- Port Vale Player of the Year: 2015–16
- Swindon Town Player of the Season: 2019–20
