= Lee Barnard =

English footballer (born 1984)

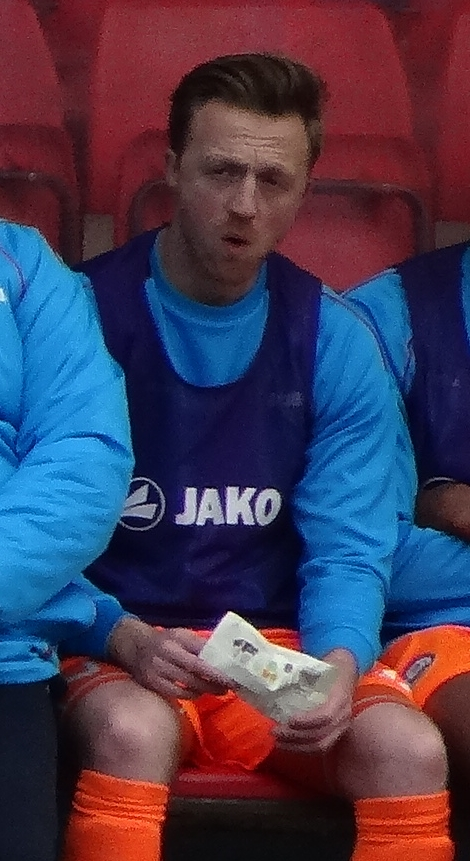
- Barnard with Braintree Town in 2017

Personal information
- Full name: Lee James Barnard
- Date of birth: 18 July 1984 (age 42)
- Place of birth: Romford, England
- Height: 5 ft 10 in (1.78 m)
- Position: Striker

Youth career
- –2002: Tottenham Hotspur

Senior career*
Years	Team	Apps	(Gls)
2002–2008	Tottenham Hotspur	3	(0)
2002	→ Exeter City (loan)	3	(0)
2004	→ Stevenage Borough (loan)	4	(1)
2004–2005	→ Leyton Orient (loan)	8	(0)
2005	→ Northampton Town (loan)	5	(0)
2007–2008	→ Crewe Alexandra (loan)	10	(3)
2008–2010	Southend United	75	(35)
2010–2014	Southampton	62	(23)
2012–2013	→ AFC Bournemouth (loan)	15	(4)
2013	→ Oldham Athletic (loan)	14	(3)
2014	→ Southend United (loan)	13	(1)
2014–2015	Southend United	9	(1)
2014–2015	→ Stevenage (loan)	6	(3)
2015–2016	Crawley Town	28	(1)
2016–2017	Braintree Town	35	(3)
2017–2018	Chelmsford City	18	(5)
2018	→ Maldon & Tiptree (loan)	9	(8)
2018	Maldon & Tiptree	0	(0)
Total		317	(52)
- * Club domestic league appearances and goals

Lee James Barnard (born 18 July 1984) is an English former professional footballer who played as a striker.

== Early life ==
Born in Romford, London Borough of Havering in 1984, he attended Billericay's Mayflower County High School.

== Career ==
Barnard played for Leyton Orient, Northampton Town, Exeter City, and Stevenage Borough (where he scored his first career goal against Shrewsbury Town), all on loan from Tottenham Hotspur.

=== Tottenham Hotspur ===
Thanks to his prodigious goal scoring rate at reserve level, he was expected to make his first team debut in the 2005–06 season. He was due to make his debut in the match against Charlton Athletic on 5 February 2006. Tottenham were leading 3–0 until a Charlton goal in the 69th minute meant Martin Jol did not want to bring on another striker so Barnard had to wait. Following the match he suffered a foot sprain which kept him out of action for five weeks, only returning for the reserve match against Leicester City on 18 March.

On 17 April, he finally got to make his Premier League debut in the 2–1 defeat to Manchester United at White Hart Lane, coming on after 77 minutes as a substitute. He also came on the following week against Bolton Wanderers.

Barnard was one of ten Spurs squad members to be struck down by a virus on the evening of 6 May before their crucial final game of the season against West Ham United. Unable to postpone, they went on to lose and therefore slipped to fifth. This allowed rivals Arsenal to take the fourth Champions League place for that season.

On 30 August 2007, Barnard was loaned out to League One team Crewe Alexandra for five months, after a delay due to an injury in training. Barnard made a scoring début in the Railwaymen's 2–0 home win over Huddersfield Town on 8 September 2007. However, he damaged ankle ligaments in late October and returned to Spurs for two months for treatment.

=== Southend United ===
Southend United announced on 25 January 2008, that Barnard had signed a permanent contract that would have kept him at Roots Hall until 2010. He made his debut for Southend that night against Barnsley, in the FA Cup coming on as a substitute in the 64th minute, replacing Gary Hooper. On 29 January, Barnard made his full league debut against Leeds United and scored the only goal of the game in the 41st minute, pouncing on a loose ball after Steven Hammell's free kick had hit the post. Barnard scored nine goals from January until the end of the season, including an injury time winner at Carlisle United, who had the best home record in the league. Barnard endured a frustrating 2008–09 season due to injuries, despite this he still finished the season as the club's top scorer and the only player in the squad that season to reach double figures, getting his 10th goal of the campaign away at Northampton Town. Southend had only lost once when Barnard has scored. He started the 2009–10 season scoring four goals in his first three matches, and scored his first professional hat-trick in the 3–0, League One victory over Leyton Orient on 4 September. On 30 October, Barnard scored a 93rd-minute winner against Gillingham, he followed that up with another last minute goal, this time from the penalty spot against Milton Keynes Dons in the 2–1 win. On 12 December 2009, Southend came from 2–0 down to beat Hartlepool United 3–2 with Barnard scoring a brace. His last goal for Southend came on 28 December at Leyton Orient, with Southend claiming a 2–1 victory. He made his last appearance for Southend away to Huddersfield Town in the 2–1 defeat. In his two years at the club, Barnard made 85 appearances for Southend and scored 37 times.

=== Southampton ===
Barnard signed for Southampton on 22 January 2010 for an undisclosed fee, with Matt Paterson joining Southend. He had scored 17 goals in all competitions for Southend in the 2009–10 season. He made his debut the following day against Ipswich Town in the FA Cup in a 2–1 win. He made his league debut for the club on 26 January, against Brentford in a 1–1 draw. On 20 February, Barnard scored his debut league goals for Southampton, against title challengers Norwich City, scoring both goals in the 2–0 win which saw the end of Norwich's 11-match winning run. A week later he showed the same form as he netted a brace against Walsall in a 5–1 victory, and then scoring again three days later in the 5–0 win over Huddersfield Town. He was unable to contribute to Southampton winning the 2009–10 Football League Trophy as he was cup-tied.

In the 2010–11 season he scored twice against Yeovil in a 3–0 victory and four days later scored the first goal in a 3–1 away win at AFC Bournemouth. He finished the season with 16 goals, but missed the last few weeks due to injury.

==== AFC Bournemouth (loan) ====
On 18 August 2012, he joined AFC Bournemouth on loan until 1 January 2013. He made his Cherries debut on the same day, scoring the equalising goal in a 1–1 draw at Portsmouth.

==== Oldham Athletic (loan) ====
On 31 January 2013, he joined Oldham Athletic on loan for the rest of the season. Barnard scored on his debut against Walsall, giving Oldham Athletic the lead with a header from a Lee Croft cross.

=== Return to Southend United ===
On 24 January 2014, he rejoined Southend United on loan until the end of the season with a view to a permanent transfer in the summer, when his contract at Southampton expired.

On 17 May 2014, Southampton announced that Barnard would be released. It was subsequently revealed that Barnard had signed a one-year contract with Southend at the same time as signing his loan deal.

On 1 June 2015, he was released by Southend United.

=== Later career ===
On 28 July 2015, Barnard joined Crawley Town on a one-year deal. Barnard only scored once in 28 League Two games for the club, scoring in a 2–1 defeat against Yeovil Town on 23 January 2016.

In June 2016, Barnard dropped down into non-League football, signing for National League club Braintree Town. On 9 August 2016, Barnard scored his first goal for the club in a 1–1 draw against Eastleigh. Four days later, Barnard scored his second goal for Braintree, in his third game for the club, in a 3–1 defeat against Macclesfield Town.

In June 2017, Barnard dropped a division to join rivals Chelmsford City. On 8 August 2017, Barnard scored in his second appearance for the club in a 1–0 win against Welling United. On 22 March 2018, following the arrivals of strikers Scott Fenwick and Philip Roberts, Barnard joined Isthmian Division One North club Maldon & Tiptree on loan until the end of the season. Following his loan, Barnard signed for Maldon & Tiptree on a permanent basis, however Barnard retired shortly after signing following a hamstring tear.

== Personal life ==
On 3 October 2010, Barnard was arrested in connection with a brawl in the White House nightclub in Southampton; he was immediately given police bail to go to Southampton General Hospital to have treatment for an injury to his hand. Amongst the witnesses to the incident was cage fighter, Tom Watson, who was celebrating his recent victory over Celebrity Big Brother winner Alex Reid.

The matter came to trial at Salisbury Crown Court in April 2012 where Lee Barnard was cleared of all charges after the jury took less than an hour to find him not guilty of any crime.

== Career statistics ==
Appearances and goals by club, season and competition
Club	Season	League			FA Cup		League Cup		Other		Total	
Club	Season	Division	Apps	Goals	Apps	Goals	Apps	Goals	Apps	Goals	Apps	Goals
Tottenham Hotspur	2005–06	Premier League	3	0	0	0	0	0	—		3	0
Exeter City (loan)	2002–03	Third Division	3	0	0	0	0	0	1 (Note: Appearances in the Football League Trophy)	0	4	0
Stevenage Borough (loan)	2003–04	Conference National	4	1	0	0	—		0	0	4	1
Leyton Orient (loan)	2004–05	League Two	8	0	1	0	0	0	1	0	10	0
Northampton Town (loan)	2004–05	League Two	5	0	—		0	0	0	0	5	0
Crewe Alexandra (loan)	2007–08	League One	10	3	0	0	0	0	0	0	10	3
Southend United	2007–08	League One	15	9	1	0	0	0	2 (Note: Appearances in the League One play-offs)	0	18	9
Southend United	2008–09	League One	35	11	2	0	1	0	1	0	39	11
Southend United	2009–10	League One	25	15	0	0	2	2	1	0	28	17
Southend United	Total		75	35	3	0	3	2	4	0	85	37
Southampton	2009–10	League One	20	9	2	0	—		0	0	22	9
Southampton	2010–11	League One	36	14	3	1	2	0	1	0	42	15
Southampton	2011–12	Championship	6	0	2	0	1	0	—		9	0
Southampton	Total		62	23	7	1	3	0	1	0	73	24
AFC Bournemouth (loan)	2012–13	League One	15	4	0	0	0	0	1	0	16	4
Oldham Athletic (loan)	2012–13	League One	14	3	2	0	0	0	0	0	16	3
Southend United (loan)	2013–14	League Two	13	1	0	0	0	0	1 (Note: Appearance in the League Two play-offs)	0	14	1
Southend United	2014–15	League Two	9	1	0	0	1	0	1	0	11	1
Stevenage (loan)	2014–15	League Two	6	3	2	0	—		0	0	8	3
Crawley Town	2015–16	League Two	28	1	1	0	1	0	1	0	31	1
Braintree Town	2016–17	National League	35	3	3	2	—		3 (Note: Appearances in the FA Trophy)	1	41	6
Chelmsford City	2017–18	National League South	14	5	3	0	—		0	0	17	5
Career total			304	83	22	3	8	2	14	1	348	89
