= Stuart O'Keefe =

English footballer

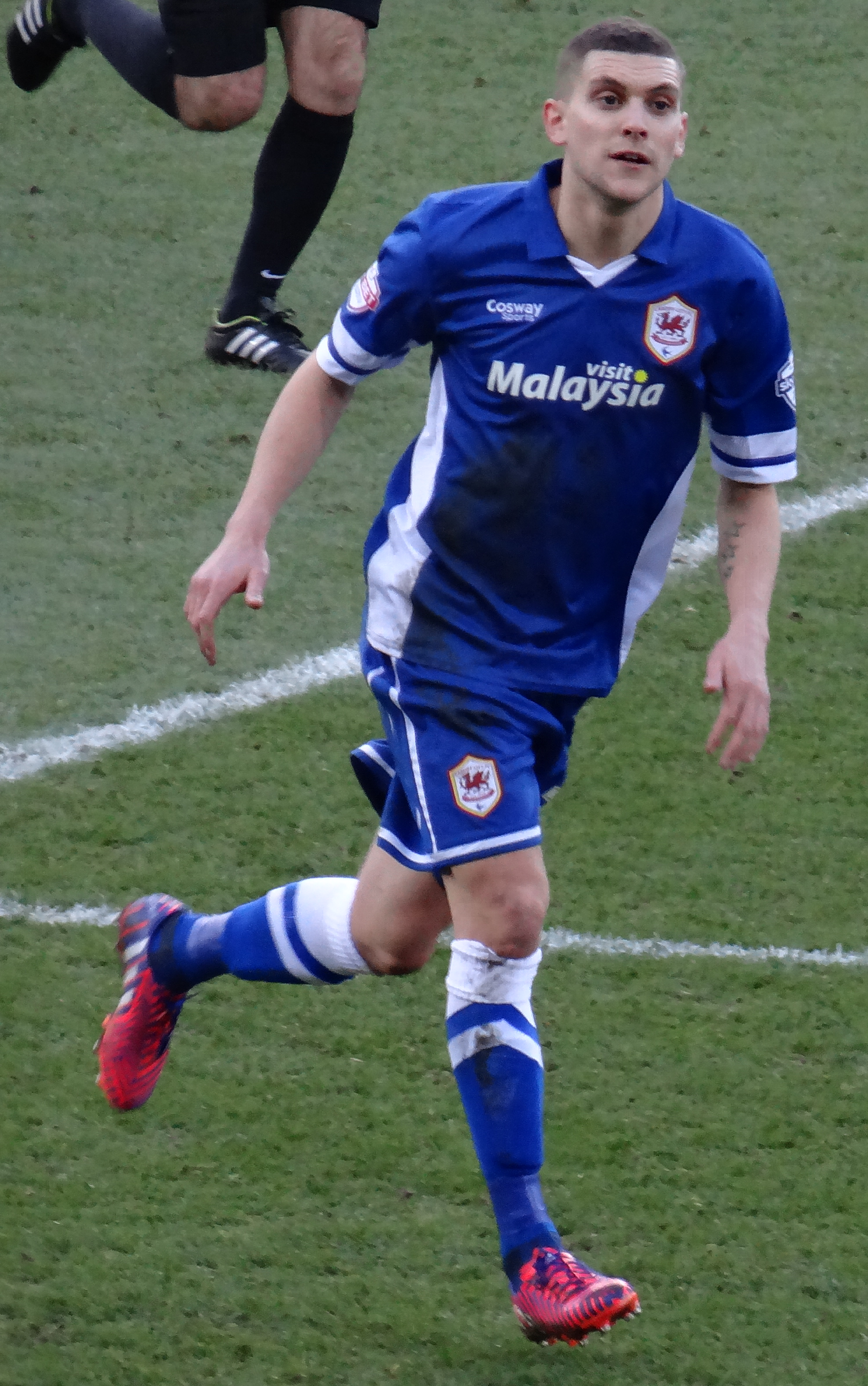
- O'Keefe playing for Cardiff City in 2015

Personal information
- Full name: Stuart Antony Alan O'Keefe
- Date of birth: 4 March 1991 (age 35)
- Place of birth: Eye, England
- Height: 5 ft 8 in (1.73 m)
- Position: Central midfielder

Youth career
- Scole Lads
- 2001–2007: Ipswich Town
- 2007–2008: Southend United

Senior career*
Years	Team	Apps	(Gls)
2008–2010	Southend United	10	(0)
2010–2015	Crystal Palace	36	(1)
2014	→ Blackpool (loan)	4	(0)
2015–2019	Cardiff City	38	(2)
2017	→ Milton Keynes Dons (loan)	18	(4)
2017–2018	→ Portsmouth (loan)	21	(0)
2018–2019	→ Plymouth Argyle (loan)	11	(0)
2019–2023	Gillingham	112	(4)
2023–2024	Aldershot Town	19	(0)
2024–2025	Chatham Town	17	(1)
- * Club domestic league appearances and goals as of 12:12, 15 January 2025 (UTC)

Stuart Antony Alan O'Keefe (born 4 March 1991) is an English professional footballer who last played as a central midfielder for Isthmian League Premier Division club Chatham Town. He is currently a free agent.

He began his career with Ipswich Town, spending six years in the club's youth academy system, but was released as a teenager without making an appearance for the first team. Following his release, O'Keefe joined the academy at Southend United, making his first-team debut for the club in 2008, during a League One match, at the age of 17. In 2010, he completed a move to Championship club Crystal Palace on a free transfer and went on to make over 50 appearances in all competitions for the club during a five-year spell, helping the club gain promotion to the Premier League via the 2013 Championship play-off final, also spending a brief period on loan at Blackpool in late 2014. In January 2015, he moved to Cardiff City for an undisclosed fee.

== Early life ==
O'Keefe was born in Eye, Suffolk. He grew up in the village of Gislingham, Suffolk and attended Gislingham Primary School and later Hartismere School. He is a supporter of Arsenal.

== Career ==
=== Youth ===
Having attracted the attention of scouts from several clubs whilst playing for local youth team Scole Lads, O'Keefe was invited to train with Norwich City's under-nine team. However, he later signed a youth deal with their East Anglian rivals Ipswich Town, joining the club at the age of nine and playing alongside Jordan Rhodes and Ed Upson in the academy during his time at the club. However, he failed to make an appearance for the first team and was released at the end of the 2006–07 season after Ipswich decided against offering him a scholarship, believing that he would be unable to compete physically at under-18 level. O'Keefe later commented on his release "It was disappointing to be released by Ipswich, especially since I had been there from such a young age, but I always kept believing in myself".

Following his release, O'Keefe spent one month on trial at Aston Villa and impressed the club's coaching staff, including youth coach Gordon Cowans, but was forced to leave the club, who were only willing to offer him a one-year youth contract, after struggling to travel to the Midlands-based club on a regular basis as he continued to prepare for his GCSEs. He was also offered a trial with Nottingham Forest, scoring during a friendly match for the club but O'Keefe again moved on after Forest stalled over offering him a contract as they were only willing to offer him a one-year youth deal.

=== Southend United ===
O'Keefe attended a trial with Southend United in November 2007 at the age of 16, having been recommended to the club by a scout working for Manchester United, and was offered a two-year scholarship just days after arriving at the club. In his first season with the academy, O'Keefe was part of the Southend team that reached the quarter-final of the FA Youth Cup and also featured for the reserves on several occasions. O'Keefe made his first-team debut for Southend on 18 November 2008, at home to A.F.C. Telford United in a 2–0 win in the FA Cup first-round replay as a late substitute in place of Alan McCormack, having signed his first professional contract with the club the week before. He made his debut in League One two months later against Leyton Orient on 20 January 2009 in a 1–1 away draw, again coming on as a substitute in the 84th minute for Alex Revell and nearly scoring late in the match with a volley.

The following week, after one further substitute appearance, O'Keefe was handed his first league start for Southend by manager Steve Tilson against Leeds United at Elland Road on 27 January 2009. However, this proved to be his last appearance for the club during the 2008–09 season. Despite this, O'Keefe was nominated for the League One Apprentice of the Year award, eventually losing out to Carlisle United defender Tom Aldred. The following season, O'Keefe featured more regularly for the first team, making nine appearances in total despite missing two months of the season due to a hernia injury sustained in a match against Millwall on 26 January 2010. Following his departure from Roots Hall, the club's head of youth director Ricky Duncan praised O'Keefe's attitude, stating "Stuart was always very driven and single-minded and he was different to a lot of the other lads in that regard."

=== Crystal Palace ===
On 18 August 2010, O'Keefe signed for Crystal Palace on an initial one-year contract after impressing manager George Burley in a trial match against West Ham United reserves, having been recommended to Burley by his assistant manager Dougie Freedman who had played alongside O'Keefe at Southend. On his signing, Burley described O'Keefe as "a young player with big potential". The transfer was free, although Southend would receive a percentage of any transfer fee for O'Keefe in his first 36 months at Selhurst Park. He made his debut for the club on 20 November 2010 as a substitute in place of Paddy McCarthy during a 3–2 defeat to Sheffield United, later being substituted himself in the 89th minute of the match for Pablo Couñago as Palace pushed for an equaliser. In his first season at Selhurst Park, O'Keefe was a backup player in the squad and made just four appearances during the course of the season. In the 2011–12 season, O'Keefe was given a chance to impress early on in the season in the League Cup, playing five times in the competition during the season as the team reached the semi-final, including starting in the team's 2–1 quarter final victory over Manchester United on 30 November 2011 at Old Trafford. Later in the season, O'Keefe was part of the end of season run in due to injuries and finished the season with 19 appearances for the first team, which saw him offered a new three-year contract with Palace that would last until summer 2015.

During the 2012–13 season, Palace achieved promotion to the Premier League via the Championship play-offs after finishing fifth. O'Keefe featured just five times in the league during the season although he did make two appearances during the play-offs, replacing Wilfried Zaha as a late substitute during the second leg of their semi-final victory over Brighton & Hove Albion, and then playing the majority of the 2013 Championship play-off final after replacing Kagisho Dikgacoi due to injury after just 17 minutes as Palace claimed a 1–0 victory in extra-time to earn promotion. At the start of the club's Premier League campaign the following season, on 31 August 2013, O'Keefe sealed a 3–1 victory in Palace's first three points of their Premier League return in the 92nd minute at home to Sunderland with a curling 20-yard shot after coming on as a late substitute, the first senior goal of his career and what later turned out to be his only goal for Palace.

At the start of the 2014–15 season, O'Keefe featured in Palace's opening two matches of the Premier League season, defeats to Arsenal and West Ham United, but suffered an ankle injury in the latter which kept him out of the team for two months that saw him omitted from the club's 25-man squad for the Premier League season by new Palace manager Neil Warnock. Lacking match fitness on his return, Warnock made O'Keefe available for a loan move in order to gain playing time and, following a potential loan move to Championship club Charlton Athletic collapsing after they decided to sign Francis Coquelin on loan from Arsenal instead, Warnock stated that he could not "understand how nobody has come in for him".

On 27 November 2014, O'Keefe eventually secured a loan move away from Palace on the final day of the emergency loan window, joining struggling Championship club Blackpool on loan until 1 January 2015, along with Wolverhampton Wanderers defender Kevin Foley. He made his debut on 29 November 2014, starting in a 1–1 draw with Rotherham United, being replaced by Nathan Delfouneso after 56 minutes, and went on to make four appearances for the team before returning to Palace. On his return to Selhurst Park, O'Keefe found himself under a new manager for the fourth time since August 2014, following the appointment of Alan Pardew. Despite being handed a starting spot in Pardew's first match in charge at the club, a 4–0 win over non-League team Dover Athletic in the third round of the FA Cup on 4 January 2015, he was later informed that he was not part of the manager's new plans at the club.

=== Cardiff City ===
On 28 January 2015, O'Keefe signed for Championship club Cardiff City, who beat off competition from Millwall, for an undisclosed fee on a two-and-a-half-year contract, joining former Palace teammates Danny Gabbidon and Kagisho Dikgacoi at the Cardiff City Stadium. He made his debut against Derby County, having trained with the team for just two days following the completion of his transfer, in a 2–0 loss. He featured in the following two matches but, with heavy competition from Peter Whittingham, Joe Ralls and Aron Gunnarsson, he did not appear for the first team again until 11 April and made a total of just six appearances during the second half of the season for Cardiff.

The start of the following season continued the same trend for O'Keefe as he made just eight appearances during the first five months of the season before returning to the starting line up against Wolverhampton Wanderers on 16 January 2016, in a match that Cardiff went on to win 3–1. O'Keefe's performances saw him establish himself in the first team and his attitude to being left out of the team for long periods drew praise from Cardiff manager Russell Slade who commented "Stuart has got a fantastic attitude, he's a real, real good professional, even when he wasn't in the side he was pushing. [...] some players when they're not in the side get disillusioned and want to move on, but not O'Keefe." He later scored his first goal for the club in a 2–0 victory during a Severnside derby match against Bristol City on 5 March 2016, adding his second one-month later with the winning goal during a 2–1 win over Derby County on 2 April. He finished the season having made 27 appearances for the club in all competitions, the most appearances he has made during a season to date and the first time in his career he made over 20 appearances in a single season.

His impressive form during the second half of the 2015–16 season saw him handed a new contract during the summer, keeping him at Cardiff until summer 2019. After featuring as an unused substitute during the first match of the 2016–17 season, O'Keefe was handed his first appearance of the season in a 1–0 defeat to Bristol Rovers in the first round of the EFL Cup, where he suffered a broken arm in extra-time. He made his return to the team one month later on 25 September, helping Cardiff to their second win of the season during a 2–1 win against Rotherham United. However, with first-team opportunities limited at Cardiff, on 31 January 2017, O'Keefe joined League One club Milton Keynes Dons on loan until 1 May 2017, making his debut for the club as a substitute in place of Chuks Aneke during a 1–1 draw with Bolton Wanderers on 4 February 2017. He made a total of 18 appearances during the loan spell, scoring four times.

On 31 August 2017, O'Keefe joined League One club Portsmouth on loan until the end of the 2017–18 season. At the start of the following season, O'Keefe was sent out on loan for the second successive season, joining Plymouth Argyle. He returned to Cardiff in January 2019, but was released later that year.

=== Gillingham ===
O'Keefe signed for League One club Gillingham on 11 June 2019. He scored his first goal for Gillingham when he scored in an EFL Trophy tie against Colchester United on 3 September 2019. In September 2020 O'Keefe suffered a broken leg and ligament damage in an EFL Cup tie against Coventry City. O'Keefe knocked months off of his return date following his broken leg, and after a few appearances off the bench, made his first start since the injury against Charlton Athletic in February 2021.

On 18 May 2021, he signed a contract extension with the Kent club. He was named as the side's Player of the Season for 2021–22, but could not prevent their relegation to League Two.

On 3 May 2023, manager Neil Harris confirmed that captain O'Keefe had played his last match for the club and would leave upon the expiration of his contract in the summer.

=== Aldershot Town ===
On 20 July 2023, following his departure from Gillingham, O'Keefe agreed to join National League side, Aldershot Town. He was named as the new club captain ahead of the new season. Following the conclusion of the 2023–24 season and upon expiration of his contract, he was released.

=== Chatham Town ===
On 7 June 2024, O'Keefe joined Isthmian League Premier Division side Chatham Town.

== Style of play ==
After originally beginning his career as a winger, O'Keefe switched to central midfield and was described by former Cardiff City manager Russell Slade as a "hard working, energetic, athletic midfield player." Slade also praised O'Keefe for his determination when not playing regularly in the first team, stating " Stuart will roll his sleeves up, work harder, to try and show his manager and the coaching staff that he's capable of playing in the first team."

== Career statistics ==
As of end of 2023–24 season

Appearances and goals by club, season and competition
Club	Season	League			FA Cup		League Cup		Other		Total	
Club	Season	Division	Apps	Goals	Apps	Goals	Apps	Goals	Apps	Goals	Apps	Goals
Southend United	2008–09	League One	3	0	1	0	0	0	0	0	4	0
Southend United	2009–10	League One	7	0	1	0	0	0	1 (Note: Appearance in Football League Trophy)	0	9	0
Southend United	Total		10	0	2	0	0	0	1	0	13	0
Crystal Palace	2010–11	Championship	4	0	0	0	0	0	—		4	0
Crystal Palace	2011–12	Championship	13	0	1	0	5	0	—		19	0
Crystal Palace	2012–13	Championship	5	0	1	0	2	0	2 (Note: Appearances in Championship play-offs)	0	10	0
Crystal Palace	2013–14	Premier League	12	1	2	0	1	0	—		15	1
Crystal Palace	2014–15	Premier League	2	0	1	0	0	0	—		3	0
Crystal Palace	Total		36	1	5	0	8	0	2	0	51	1
Blackpool (loan)	2014–15	Championship	4	0	—		—		—		4	0
Cardiff City	2014–15	Championship	6	0	—		—		—		6	0
Cardiff City	2015–16	Championship	24	2	1	0	2	0	—		27	2
Cardiff City	2016–17	Championship	8	0	1	0	1	0	—		10	0
Cardiff City	2017–18	Championship	0	0	—		2	0	—		2	0
Cardiff City	2018–19	Premier League	0	0	0	0	—		—		0	0
Cardiff City	Total		38	2	2	0	5	0	—		45	2
Milton Keynes Dons (loan)	2016–17	League One	18	4	—		—		—		18	4
Portsmouth (loan)	2017–18	League One	21	0	1	0	—		3 (Note: Appearance(s) in EFL Trophy)	2	25	2
Plymouth Argyle (loan)	2018–19	League One	11	0	0	0	1	0	1	0	13	0
Gillingham	2019–20	League One	30	3	3	0	0	0	2	1	35	4
Gillingham	2020–21	League One	24	0	0	0	2	0	0	0	26	0
Gillingham	2021–22	League One	38	1	1	0	2	0	2	0	43	1
Gillingham	2022–23	League Two	20	0	4	0	3	0	0	0	27	0
Gillingham	Total		112	4	8	0	7	0	4	1	131	5
Aldershot Town	2023–24	National League	19	0	2	0	—		1 (Note: Appearance(s) in FA Trophy)	0	22	0
Career total			269	12	20	0	21	0	12	3	322	14

== Honours ==
Crystal Palace

- Football League Championship play-offs: 2013

Individual

- Gillingham Player of the Season: 2021–22
