= Marcus Milner (footballer) =

Jamaican footballer (born 1991)

Personal information
- Full name: Marcus Raglan Webb Milner
- Date of birth: 28 November 1991 (age 34)
- Place of birth: Kingston, Jamaica
- Height: 5 ft 10 in (1.78 m)
- Position: Midfielder

Team information
- Current team: Hucknall Town

Youth career
- ?–2010: Southend United

Senior career*
Years	Team	Apps	(Gls)
2010–201?	Southend United	1	(0)
201?	Maldon & Tiptree	?	(?)
2012–2014	Wingate & Finchley	?	(?)
2014	Crawley Down Gatwick	?	(?)
2014	Ware	?	(?)
2014–201?	Brentwood Town	?	(?)
201?–	Ware	?	(?)
2024	Hucknall Town	5	(0)
- * Club domestic league appearances and goals as of 15:38, 11 December 2014 (UTC)

Marcus Raglan Webb Milner (born 28 November 1991) is a Jamaican footballer who last played for Hucknall Town as a midfielder.

== Career ==
Born in Kingston, Surrey, Milner made his debut for Southend United on 8 May 2010 in their 3–1 away defeat to Southampton in League One, replacing Stuart O'Keefe in the 87th minute as a substitute.

During the 2012–13 season Milner made 11 appearances for Isthmian League team Wingate & Finchley and re-signed for the club for the 2013–14 season.

Milner played his last game for Wingate & Finchley on 21 September 2013 in a 3–1 defeat against Lewes before signing for Isthmian League Division One South club Crawley Down Gatwick in January 2014.
