= Julian Okai =

English footballer

Personal information
- Date of birth: 26 February 1993 (age 33)
- Place of birth: Southend-on-Sea, England
- Height: 5 ft 7 in (1.70 m)
- Position: Midfielder

Team information
- Current team: Great Wakering Rovers

Youth career
- 2006–2009: Southend United

Senior career*
Years	Team	Apps	(Gls)
2009–2011	Southend United	0	(0)
2011	Concord Rangers		
2011–	Great Wakering Rovers	8	(2)
- * Club domestic league appearances and goals as of 18:58, 2 January 2012 (UTC)

Julian Ebenezer N. A. Okai (born 26 February 1993) is an English footballer who plays as a midfielder for Isthmian League Division One North club Great Wakering Rovers.

== Career ==
He made his debut on 7 November 2009 for Southend United in their 3–0 away defeat to Gillingham in the FA Cup First Round, replacing Francis Laurent in the 89th minute as a substitute. Okai made a total of 49 appearances and scored 10 goals for Southend's youth team, and 16 appearances in the club's reserve team. It was announced in March 2011, that Okai was not to be offered a new contract at Southend and was to be released at the end of the 2010–11 season.

He then went on to sign for Isthmian League Premier Division club Concord Rangers and then Isthmian League Division One North club Great Wakering Rovers in November 2011. In 2012, he accepted a scholarship at California State University to play for the Cal State Fullerton Titans.
