= Alan McCormack =

Irish association football player

Personal information
- Full name: Alan McCormack
- Date of birth: 10 January 1984 (age 42)
- Place of birth: Dublin, Ireland
- Height: 5 ft 8 in (1.73 m)
- Positions: Right-back; midfielder

Youth career
- –2002: Stella Maris
- 2002–2003: Preston North End

Senior career*
Years	Team	Apps	(Gls)
2003–2007	Preston North End	11	(0)
2003	→ Leyton Orient (loan)	10	(0)
2005	→ Southend United (loan)	7	(2)
2005–2006	→ Motherwell (loan)	24	(2)
2006	→ Southend United (loan)	8	(1)
2007–2010	Southend United	131	(15)
2010–2011	Charlton Athletic	24	(1)
2011–2013	Swindon Town	80	(2)
2013–2017	Brentford	99	(2)
2017–2019	Luton Town	35	(1)
2019–2020	Northampton Town	15	(0)
2020–2021	Southend United	20	(0)
2022–2024	Heybridge Swifts	3	(0)
Total		467	(26)

International career
- Republic of Ireland Schoolboys
2003	Republic of Ireland U19	1	(0)
- * Club domestic league appearances and goals

Alan McCormack (born 10 January 1984) is an Irish football coach and former professional player who played as a right-back or midfielder. He was most recently a coach at EFL League One club Leyton Orient.

He began his career at Preston North End and later played for Southend United, Charlton Athletic and Swindon Town before signing for Brentford in 2013. He was capped at schoolboy and U19 level by the Republic of Ireland.

== Club career ==
=== Preston North End and loan spells ===
McCormack was born in Dublin and began his career with Stella Maris. He moved to England to sign for First Division club Preston North End in December 2002 after impressing on trial, and progressed to sign a professional contract in 2003. He joined Leyton Orient of the Third Division on 29 August 2003 on a one-month loan and made the first professional appearance of his career in a 4–1 home defeat to Cheltenham Town the following day, when he replaced Billy Jones at half-time. McCormack received the first red card of his career in a 0–0 draw with Lincoln City on 13 September, after committing two bookable offences. In late September, caretaker manager Martin Ling extended McCormack's loan until 1 November. He was sent off again in a 1–1 draw with Northampton Town on 25 October. He made 11 appearances, accumulating six yellow and two red cards, before his loan expired. McCormack made his Preston debut on 6 March 2004 in a league match against Burnley, when he replaced Dickson Etuhu after 55 minutes. He made four further appearances before the end of the 2003–04 season.

After making four substitute appearances at the beginning of the 2004–05 season, McCormack was made available for transfer in September 2004. He joined League Two club Southend United on loan on 16 March 2005 and made his debut three days later, starting in a 3–0 victory over Cheltenham Town. In April, the loan was extended until the end of the 2004–05 season. He was an 81st-minute substitute for Mark Gower during the 2005 Football League Trophy Final against Wrexham at the Millennium Stadium, but was denied the first silverware of his career when Wrexham won the match 2–0 after extra time. McCormack scored the first senior goals of his career with a brace in a 2–1 away victory over Macclesfield Town on 19 April. He made eight appearances and scored two goals during his loan spell. He spent the entire 2005–06 season on loan at Motherwell of the Scottish Premier League, making 28 appearances in all competitions, scoring two goals, accumulating 12 yellow cards and one red.

McCormack made his first Preston appearance in nearly two years when he replaced Kelvin Wilson after 41 minutes of a 1–1 Championship home draw with Queens Park Rangers on 19 August 2006. He played two further matches in September, with the latter match against Stoke City on 30 September being his final Preston appearance. He made a total of 12 appearances for the club. Looking back in August 2012 on his time with Preston, McCormack said "I had a great few years there and I learnt a hell of a lot – enough to help me go on and continue my career in the professional game in England. I've got a lot of time and a lot of credit for that, I look back and I never have a bad word to say about it. I've got nothing but good things to say about the club, I'll always have fond memories of the place".

=== Return to Southend United on loan and permanent transfer ===
In November 2006 and with his contract set to expire at the end of the 2006–07 season, McCormack handed in a transfer request, before rejoining Championship club Southend United on loan on 18 November 2006, initially until 1 January 2007, with a view to a permanent move. After an impressive first month of his spell, assistant manager Paul Brush confirmed on 11 December that McCormack would transfer to the club permanently and he subsequently signed on a two-and-a-half-year contract. In what remained of the 2006–07 season, McCormack made 26 appearances and scored three goals, but he was unable to prevent Southend's relegation to League One.

McCormack formed a central midfield partnership with Nicky Bailey during the 2007–08 season and the pair scored 20 goals between them, with McCormack scoring nine, which included a run of five goals in seven appearances in September 2007. The season ended with a play-off semi-final defeat to Doncaster Rovers, and in June 2008, he signed a new three-year contract. McCormack suffered a knee injury during the 2008–09 pre-season, which kept him out of action for eight weeks. After returning to fitness, he made 38 appearances during the season, scoring two goals. McCormack played the full 90 minutes in a 1–1 draw with Chelsea at Stamford Bridge in the FA Cup third round on 3 January 2009, but missed the replay, which Southend lost 4–1.

McCormack made 43 appearances and scored three goals during the 2009–10 season, but what would be his final season at Roots Hall culminated in the club's relegation to League Two. His contract was terminated by mutual consent on 24 June 2010. Over the course of his two spells with Southend, McCormack made 166 appearances and scored 19 goals.

=== Charlton Athletic ===
McCormack remained in League One and signed a two-year contract with Charlton Athletic on 6 July 2010. He made 31 appearances and scored one goal during the 2010–11 season as Charlton finished in mid-table. McCormack's contract was terminated by mutual consent in July 2011. Looking back in August 2014 on his time with the Addicks, McCormack said "it wasn't a great year and I didn't play particularly well. It was a bit hostile. There was a lot of stuff on the internet sent to me, so it wasn't a pretty time and I don't look back at it with fond memories".

=== Swindon Town ===
After a spell training with Swindon Town, McCormack signed a two-year contract with the League Two club on 21 July 2011. He was moved from his natural midfield position to the defence and formed a centre-back partnership with Aden Flint. He enjoyed a successful first season with the club, making 51 appearances, scoring two goals, winning the League Two championship and the Swindon Town Player of the Year award. He was a losing finalist in the Football League Trophy for the second time in his career, after Swindon were beaten 2–0 by Chesterfield in the 2012 final.

Under the management of Paolo Di Canio, McCormack had a good 2012–13 season back in League One, being named captain, making 47 appearances and helping Swindon to a sixth-place finish which saw the club qualify for the play-offs, where they were defeated on penalties by Brentford in the semi-finals. He was released by the club after the season, after failing to agree a new contract. McCormack made 98 appearances and scored two goals during his two seasons with the Robins. After leaving the club, he stated his reason for departing as being because "the first offer I got from Swindon disappointed me, I just felt that I was worth more to the club than a one-year offer. When they sent me the offer I was really gutted and disappointed and that really let me know in my head that maybe it was time to move on to another club".

=== Brentford ===
==== 2013–2015 ====
On 24 June 2013, McCormack signed a two-year contract with Brentford, who had remained in League One after suffering defeat in the 2013 League One play-off final. He began the 2013–14 season in his natural midfield position, before being moved to right-back by manager Uwe Rösler in October, to replace out-of-form Shay Logan. McCormack scored his first Brentford goal in an FA Cup first round tie against local neighbours Staines Town on 9 November, opening the scoring with a penalty in a 5–0 victory. A near ever-present under Uwe Rösler and his successor Mark Warburton, McCormack celebrated promotion to the Championship after a 1–0 victory over former club Preston North End on 18 April 2014. He finished the 2013–14 season with 45 appearances and two goals. McCormack won the Brentford Supporters' Player of the Year award and was named as the right-back in the League One Team of the Year.

After starting in each of the Bees' first seven league matches of the 2014–15 season, McCormack signed a new two-year contract, with the option of a third year. His status as an ever-present in league matches came to an end after he suffered an ankle ligament injury during a 3–1 defeat to Bolton Wanderers on 25 October 2014. He returned to light training in January 2015, but had lost the right-back position to Moses Odubajo and made just four further appearances before the end of the 2014–15 season. McCormack made 18 appearances and scored one goal during the season.

==== 2015–2017 ====
The departure of right-back Moses Odubajo on the eve of the 2015–16 season and injuries in midfield saw McCormack reinstated in the team. His ever-present status ended in early December 2015, due to groin and calf injuries. McCormack finally returned to the team for a West London derby versus Queens Park Rangers on 12 March 2016 and he played the full 90 minutes of the 3–0 defeat. After six further starts, the option to extend his contract for a further year was triggered. He finished the 2015–16 season with 29 appearances.

McCormack made his first appearance of the 2016–17 season in a 1–0 defeat to League Two team Exeter City in the EFL Cup first round on 9 August 2016, in which he was substituted in the 12th minute after suffering a foot injury. He returned to the team seven weeks later, but made just three appearances before being handed a five-match suspension and a £6,000 fine on 20 October, for charges relating to the use of "abusive and/or insulting words towards a match official" during a match against Cardiff City on 19 April 2016. After his return from suspension, he made just eight substitute appearances, making his final appearance as a substitute for Konstantin Kerschbaumer in the final match of the season, a 3–1 defeat to Blackburn Rovers. McCormack was released at the end of the season and finished his Brentford career with 104 appearances and three goals.

=== Luton Town ===
McCormack signed for League Two club Luton Town on 1 June 2017 on a contract of undisclosed length, effective from 1 July. He scored with a 25-yard volley on the opening day of the 2017–18 season in an 8–2 win at home to Yeovil Town, which was named the League Two Goal of the Month for August 2017. He was a regular in the team during the first six weeks of the season, starting in every league match until suffering a groin injury in a 2–1 away victory over Wycombe Wanderers. He suffered an injury setback after sustaining a calf injury, having been scheduled to make his return in December. McCormack made his first appearance in six months in a 1–1 draw away to Newport County, coming on as an 88th-minute substitute for Luke Gambin. He made a further seven starting appearances and finished the season with 16 appearances and one goal, at the end of which Luton were promoted to League One as League Two runners-up. McCormack signed a new one-year contract in May 2018.

He started in each of Luton's opening three league matches of the 2018–19 season, before losing his place in the team to Glen Rea. His next starting appearance in the league came over three months later in a 2–2 draw with Walsall after Rea was ruled out for the rest of the season with cruciate ligament damage. McCormack started the following 11 league matches until suffering a hamstring injury in a 1–0 win away to Bradford City. He made his return on the final day of the season, playing 82 minutes to help Luton to a 3–1 home victory over Oxford United and the League One title. McCormack made 23 appearances in all competitions and was released when his contract expired at the end of the season.

=== Northampton Town ===
He signed for League Two club Northampton Town on 5 June 2019 on a one-year contract, effective from 1 July. McCormack started as Northampton beat Exeter City 4–0 at Wembley Stadium in the 2020 League Two play-off final on 29 June 2020 to earn promotion to League One. He was released at the end of the season.

=== Third spell with Southend United ===
McCormack returned to Southend United, who were newly relegated to League Two, on 17 September 2020 on a contract until January 2021. He signed a contract extension until the end of the 2020–21 season on 19 January 2021. After being released by Southend at the end of the 2020–21 season, McCormack retired from professional football.

=== Heybridge Swifts ===
McCormack was appointed assistant to manager Steve Tilson at Isthmian League North Division club Heybridge Swifts on 24 September 2021, reuniting the pair after Tilson signed McCormack as a player at Southend United. As a result of the club undergoing a lack of available players in January 2022, McCormack came out of retirement and was registered as a player, making his debut in a 1–0 home defeat to Aveley.

== International career ==
McCormack's first exposure to international football came at schoolboy level. Injury to Darren Potter saw McCormack called up to the Republic of Ireland under-19 team for three 2003 European U19 Championship second qualifying round matches in May 2003. He failed to make the squad for the first two matches against England and Switzerland, but started the third match against Slovenia, which resulted in a 2–0 win.

== Style of play ==
The Coventry Telegraph described McCormack as "a no-nonsense tough-tackling midfielder who is prepared to put his body in places others wouldn't. He has a similar style of play to fellow countryman Roy Keane and while he has not quite reached the same level as the former Manchester United skipper, he has adopted the same dogged and determined style of football".

== Coaching career ==
McCormack began taking his coaching badges in late September 2014 and hinted that he is interested in entering coaching and management after his playing career is over. Following his retirement from playing, McCormack returned to Luton Town as an academy coach in October 2021.

McCormack became first team coach at Leyton Orient in June, 2024.

== Career statistics ==
As of match played 29 January 2022

Appearances and goals by club, season and competition
Club	Season	League			National Cup		League Cup		Other		Total	
Club	Season	Division	Apps	Goals	Apps	Goals	Apps	Goals	Apps	Goals	Apps	Goals
Preston North End	2003–04	First Division	5	0	0	0	0	0	—		5	0
Preston North End	2004–05	Championship	3	0	0	0	1	0	—		4	0
Preston North End	2006–07	Championship	3	0	—		0	0	—		3	0
Preston North End	Total		11	0	0	0	1	0	—		12	0
Leyton Orient (loan)	2003–04	Third Division	10	0	—		—		1 (Note: Appearance(s) in Football League Trophy)	0	11	0
Southend United (loan)	2004–05	League Two	7	2	—		—		1	0	8	2
Motherwell (loan)	2005–06	Scottish Premier League	24	2	1	0	3	0	—		28	2
Southend United	2006–07	Championship	22	3	3	0	1	0	—		26	3
Southend United	2007–08	League One	42	8	4	0	2	0	3 (Note: One appearance and one goal in Football League Trophy, two appearances in League One play-offs)	1	51	9
Southend United	2008–09	League One	34	2	4	0	0	0	0	0	38	2
Southend United	2009–10	League One	41	3	0	0	2	0	0	0	43	3
Southend United	Total		139	16	11	0	5	0	3	1	158	17
Charlton Athletic	2010–11	League One	24	1	4	0	0	0	3	0	31	1
Swindon Town	2011–12	League Two	40	2	4	0	2	0	5	0	51	2
Swindon Town	2012–13	League One	40	0	0	0	4	0	3 (Note: One appearance in Football League Trophy, two in League One play-offs)	0	47	0
Swindon Town	Total		80	2	4	0	6	0	8	0	98	2
Brentford	2013–14	League One	43	1	2	1	0	0	0	0	45	2
Brentford	2014–15	Championship	18	1	0	0	0	0	0	0	18	1
Brentford	2015–16	Championship	27	0	1	0	1	0	—		29	0
Brentford	2016–17	Championship	11	0	0	0	1	0	—		12	0
Brentford	Total		99	2	3	1	2	0	0	0	104	3
Luton Town	2017–18	League Two	16	1	0	0	0	0	0	0	16	1
Luton Town	2018–19	League One	19	0	1	0	0	0	3 (Note: Appearances in EFL Trophy)	0	23	0
Luton Town	Total		35	1	1	0	0	0	3	0	39	1
Northampton Town	2019–20	League Two	15	0	2	0	0	0	4 (Note: One appearance in EFL Trophy, three in League Two play-offs)	0	21	0
Southend United	2020–21	League Two	20	0	0	0	—		0	0	20	0
Heybridge Swifts	2021–22	Isthmian League North Division	3	0	—		—		—		3	0
Career total			467	26	26	1	17	0	23	1	533	28

== Honours ==
Southend United

- Football League Trophy runner-up: 2004–05

Swindon Town

- Football League Two: 2011–12
- Football League Trophy runner-up: 2011–12

Brentford

- Football League One second-place promotion: 2013–14

Luton Town

- EFL League One: 2018–19
- EFL League Two second-place promotion: 2017–18

Northampton Town

- EFL League Two play-offs: 2020

Individual

- Swindon Town Player of the Year: 2011–12
- Brentford Supporters' Player of the Year: 2013–14
- Football League One Team of the Year: 2013–14
- EFL League Two Goal of the Month: August 2017
