= James Walker (footballer, born 1987) =

Antiguan footballer (1987–2026)

Personal information
- Full name: James Luke Newton Walker
- Date of birth: 25 November 1987
- Place of birth: Hackney, England
- Date of death: 19 September 2026 (aged 38)
- Height: 5 ft 11 in (1.80 m)
- Position: Second striker

Youth career
- ?–2004: Charlton Athletic

Senior career*
| Years | Team | Apps | (Gls) |
| 2004–2008 | Charlton Athletic | 0 | (0) |
| 2006 | → Hartlepool United (loan) | 4 | (0) |
| 2006 | → Bristol Rovers (loan) | 4 | (1) |
| 2006–2007 | → Leyton Orient (loan) | 14 | (2) |
| 2007 | → Notts County (loan) | 8 | (0) |
| 2007–2008 | → Yeovil Town (loan) | 13 | (3) |
| 2008 | → Southend United (loan) | 15 | (4) |
| 2008–2010 | Southend United | 30 | (2) |
| 2009 | → Hereford United (loan) | 6 | (1) |
| 2010 | Gillingham | 5 | (0) |
| 2010–2011 | Leyton Orient | 11 | (0) |
| 2011 | Woking | 5 | (0) |
| 2011–2012 | Dover Athletic | 27 | (6) |
| 2012–2013 | Eastbourne Borough | 15 | (3) |
| 2013 | Albany Creek Exclesior | 7 | (3) |
| 2014 | Eastbourne Borough | 15 | (0) |
| 2014–2015 | Bishop's Stortford | 18 | (1) |
| 2015–2017 | East Thurrock United | 58 | (7) |
| 2017–2018 | Canvey Island | 19 | (3) |
| 2018 | Maldon & Tiptree | 4 | (0) |
| 2018–2019 | Tilbury | 4 | (1) |
| Total | | 282 | (37) |

International career
| 2003–2005 | England U17 | 25 | (3) |
| 2005 | England U18 | 2 | (0) |
| 2012 | Antigua and Barbuda | 1 | (0) |
- * Club domestic league appearances and goals

James Luke Newton Walker (25 November 1987 – 19 September 2026) was a professional footballer who played as a striker.

Walker played in the Football League for Hartlepool United, Bristol Rovers, Leyton Orient, Notts County, Yeovil Town, Southend United, Hereford United and Gillingham. Born in England, he was a youth international for England and played one senior international match for the Antigua and Barbuda national team.

From 2011, Walker played for non-League clubs while working as a PE teacher. In 2019, he suffered a cardiac arrest while teaching, subsequently required 24-hour care before his death in 2026.

== Career ==
=== Charlton Athletic ===
Walker was released by Charlton in 2006, but was invited back on a trial by new manager Iain Dowie during pre-season, and he impressed by scoring against Millwall, Germinal Beerschot and Hibernian, earning a new one-year contract. He had loan spells with Hartlepool United and Bristol Rovers. With the latter, he scored his first career goal, against Boston United.

On 23 November 2006, Walker joined Leyton Orient on a two-month loan deal. He scored with his final touch for the club in a 5–2 away win against Millwall on 20 February 2007. He joined Notts County on loan in March 2007 and later joined Yeovil Town on a three-month loan in October 2007.

=== Southend United ===
After returning in January 2008, he was close to joining another League One side, Southend United, for £200,000. However, the move was cancelled after he was discovered to have an irregular heart rhythm after he failed a medical. The following month he was signed on loan by Southend, and scored on his debut against AFC Bournemouth.

At the start of Southend's 2008–09 season, Walker was used as a winger rather than a striker. On 13 December 2008, in the club's League One game against Huddersfield Town, Walker missed a penalty which would have put Southend on level terms, instead Southend slipped to a 1–0 defeat. On 20 January 2009, Walker came off the bench against Leyton Orient to rescue a point in the sixth minute of injury time with an individual effort after taking on four defenders.

On 22 September 2009, Walker joined Hereford United on a month's loan spell. He made his debut in a 4–1 loss to Rochdale on 26 September 2009. He then scored his first goal against Dagenham & Redbridge on 3 October 2009, and his second goal followed three days later in a Football League Trophy tie against Aldershot Town.

=== Gillingham ===
On 1 February 2010 he agreed to have his Southend contract terminated and joined Gillingham on a free transfer. He made his debut in 4–0 defeat to Brentford. Walker was released at the end of the season.

=== Leyton Orient ===
In September 2010, Walker joined Leyton Orient on a three-month deal, which was later extended by another month. He left the club when this deal expired on 11 January 2011, having made 14 appearances in all competitions without scoring, although he was almost always used as a late substitute.

On 16 February 2011 Walker joined Grimsby Town on trial.

=== Later career ===
On 3 March 2011, Walker signed for Conference South side Woking on a contract until the end of the season. In July 2011, Walker signed for Conference South side Dover Athletic after a successful pre-season trial. He was released at the end of the season.

In August 2012, Walker signed for Conference South side Eastbourne Borough after a successful pre-season trial. Walker left Eastbourne for personal reasons on 26 February 2013.

Walker moved to Australia with former Eastbourne Borough player Marvin Hamilton to play in the Brisbane Premier League for Albany Creek Excelsior. His first game was against UQFC on 29 June. In August 2014, Walker re-signed for Conference South side Eastbourne Borough after a successful pre-season trial. However, with fitness problems and not scoring in his first 15 appearances Walker was told by manager Tommy Widdrington that he could start to look for a new club.

He signed for Bishop's Stortford on 9 December 2014. Walker joined East Thurrock United for the 2015/16 season. He scored his first goal in an FA Cup tie against Carshalton Athletic.

Walker joined Canvey Island for the 2017–18 season, where he made nineteen league appearances, scoring three goals, but moved down a division to join Maldon & Tiptree in the Isthmian League Division One North in March 2018. He played four times for Maldon & Tiptree. Walker signed for Tilbury for the 2018–2019 season. He made four league appearances for the club, scoring in his final game as Tilbury lost 1–2 at home against Basildon United.

== International career ==
Born in England, Walker was of Antiguan descent. He was a former youth international for England. While at Eastbourne, Walker was called up to play for Antigua and Barbuda, coming on as a second-half substitute against Guatemala in a 2014 World Cup qualifier in September 2012.

== Personal life and death ==
After leaving professional football, Walker was a PE teacher at Ramsden Hall Academy, a special needs school in Billericay. In February 2019, he suffered a cardiac arrest while teaching. He subsequently lived in a 24-hour care home in Southend-on-Sea. In May 2023, a charitable match was held by his former teammates for his care, and was attended by his former schoolmate Fabrice Muamba, who survived a cardiac arrest during a match in 2012.

Walker died on 19 September 2026, at the age of 38.
