= Damian Scannell =

English footballer

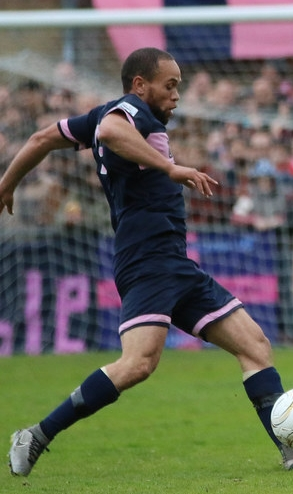
- Scannell playing for Dulwich Hamlet in 2016

Personal information
- Full name: Damian Scannell
- Date of birth: 28 April 1985 (age 41)
- Place of birth: Croydon, England
- Height: 5 ft 10 in (1.78 m)
- Positions: Winger; striker

Senior career*
Years	Team	Apps	(Gls)
2003–2004	Greenwich Borough		
2004–2007	Fisher Athletic	48	(10)
2007	→ Dulwich Hamlet (loan)	8	(2)
2007–2008	Eastleigh	26	(7)
2008–2010	Southend United	53	(2)
2008–2009	→ Brentford (loan)	2	(0)
2010–2011	Dagenham & Redbridge	34	(2)
2011–2013	Eastleigh	76	(12)
2013–2014	Sutton United	36	(4)
2014–2015	Bromley	14	(2)
2015	→ Sutton United (loan)	2	(0)
2015–2016	Dulwich Hamlet	36	(7)
2016–2017	Tonbridge Angels	40	(5)
Total		375	(53)
- * Club domestic league appearances and goals

Damian Scannell (born 28 April 1985) is an English former footballer who last played for Tonbridge Angels. Earlier in his career he played for Fisher Athletic, Eastleigh, Southend United, Sutton United and Dagenham & Redbridge. Scannell was educated at Oasis Academy Shirley Park, Croydon, between 1996 and 2001.

== Club career ==
Scannell made nine appearances from the bench in the 2007–08 season as Southend United made the League One play-offs.

Scannell had a very impressive pre-season and was rewarded with his first league start against Peterborough United on 9 August 2008. Southend won 1–0. Scannell joined League Two side Brentford on a two-month loan on 27 November. He made just one start and one sub appearance before returning to Southend on 8 January 2009.

After impressive substitute appearances Scannell was given only his second league start for Southend against Carlisle United on 21 March and scored his first professional goal in a 3–0 win.

His preparations for the 2009–10 season took a blow when he contracted swine flu in July 2009. On 23 March 2010, Scannell's season was prematurely cut short when he broke his fifth metatarsal in Southend's 3–0 win over Walsall. On 24 June, Scannell rejected a new two-year contract with Southend, he instead signed a two-year contract with Dagenham & Redbridge on 29 June 2010.

On 7 December 2011, after making 34 appearances and scoring two goals for Dagenham, Scannell made a return to Eastleigh. A season at Sutton United followed, before Scannell joined Bromley. On 16 January 2015, Scannell joined Sutton United on loan.

Scannell joined Isthmian League Premier Division club Dulwich Hamlet for the second time in his career ahead of the 2015–16 season, going on to score two goals on his second debut for the club in a 3–0 win over Canvey Island, and another goal in his next game, a 2–0 win over Merstham.

Following one season at Dulwich, in which he made 48 appearances in all competitions whilst scoring 8 goals, he moved to Tonbridge Angels ahead of the 2016–17 season.

Scannell made 40 appearances for Tonbridge during his first season at the club; however, in October 2017, having not played at all during the 2017–2018 season, he was forced to retire through injury.

== Personal life ==
He is the brother of fellow footballer Sean Scannell. Scannell now runs his own gym in Croydon, SimplyFitness UK.

Scannell's father (died 2015) was from County Armagh, and was also of Jamaican heritage.
