= Lee Sawyer =

English footballer (born 1989)

Personal information
- Full name: Lee Thomas Sawyer
- Date of birth: 10 September 1989 (age 37)
- Place of birth: Leyton, London, England
- Height: 5 ft 11 in (1.80 m)
- Position: Midfielder

Youth career
- 2001–2008: Chelsea

Senior career*
Years	Team	Apps	(Gls)
2008–2009	Chelsea	0	(0)
2008	→ Southend United (loan)	12	(1)
2009	→ Coventry City (loan)	2	(0)
2009	→ Wycombe Wanderers (loan)	9	(1)
2009	→ Southend United (loan)	6	(0)
2010	Barnet	7	(1)
2010–2011	Woking	8	(0)
2011–2012	Southend United	27	(0)
2012–2013	Woking	44	(2)
2013	→ Dover Athletic (loan)	1	(0)
2013–2014	Sutton United	26	(0)
2014	→ Chelmsford City (loan)	14	(1)
2014–2016	Chelmsford City	46	(6)
2016	Bishop's Stortford	5	(0)
2018–2019	Saffron Walden Town	13	(4)
Total		220	(16)

International career
2004–2006	England U16	1	(0)
2006–2007	England U18	1	(1)
2007–2008	England U19	2	(1)
- * Club domestic league appearances and goals

Lee Thomas Sawyer (born 10 September 1989) is an English retired professional footballer who played as a midfielder. A graduate of the Chelsea F.C. academy, he never made a first-team appearance for the club, and spent most of his career in non-League football.

== Playing career ==
Sawyer started his career with Chelsea at the age of nine. In July 2007, he signed a professional contract with Chelsea. In his last season as a schoolboy, Sawyer overcame both a stress fracture in his back and cruciate ligament before being promoted to the youth and reserve teams.

In the 2006–07 season, Sawyer sat on the Chelsea bench for the last league game of the season, although he did not play. Sawyer was intended to go on the pre-season tour of the United States, but was ruled out of the tour through injury. He then dislocated his shoulder in December 2007, ruling him out of the start of the club's Youth Cup run. Sawyer played seven games for the reserves in the 2007–08 season, plus 14 appearances in the youth teams. A red card in the semi-final of the Youth Cup ruled him out of both legs of the final.

=== Southend United ===
On 18 August 2008, Sawyer went on loan to Southend United for three months to gain some first team experience. He made his debut as a substitute against Brighton & Hove Albion, on 22 August 2008. He made his first start for Southend United on 30 August 2008 against Walsall. He scored his first two goals against Leyton Orient in the 4–2 loss in the Football League Trophy on 3 September 2008. Ironically his only league goal for the club also came against Leyton Orient, in a 3–0 win on 26 September 2008. Before he returned to Chelsea Sawyer said that he wanted to return to Southend United.

=== Coventry City ===
Sawyer joined Coventry City on loan for a month on 26 January 2009. Sawyer found first team opportunities at Coventry City very limited and only made one start and one sub appearance under Chris Coleman before returning to Chelsea.

=== Wycombe Wanderers ===
Another loan deal soon followed, this time at Wycombe Wanderers, from 19 March 2009 until the end of the 2008–09 season. He scored his first goal for the club on 25 April as part of a 1–1 draw with Port Vale and played a key part in the club's promotion push to League One.

=== Return to Southend United ===
Sawyer returned to Southend United on 14 July 2009 on loan until January 2010.

However, after mutually agreeing with the club the termination of the loan, Sawyer returned to Chelsea on 26 October. Much speculation surrounded Sawyer's departure from the club and although Sawyer decided to stay quiet on the issue, Southend issued a statement claiming the player had breached the club's discipline policy. Due to the upheaval that was exposed to Sawyer at Southend United. On 12 November, it was announced that Sawyer's contract with Chelsea had been terminated by mutual consent. lll

=== Barnet ===
On 14 January 2010, Sawyer signed for Barnet on a short-term contract. He scored his first goal for the club in a 1–1 draw with Torquay United on 26 January 2010. Due to an administrative error by Barnet, Sawyer could not play for any club including Barnet for the remainder of the 2009–10 season.

=== Woking ===
On 12 November 2010, Sawyer signed on non-contract terms for Conference South club Woking. On 17 January 2011, Sawyer had reportedly left the club by mutual consent to return to Southend United. However, on the same day Southend boss Paul Sturrock denied a deal had been completed but talks with Sawyer where ongoing.

=== Southend United (third spell) ===
On 18 January 2011, Sawyer completed his return to Southend United on a deal until the end of the season with the option of a further one-year contract. Sawyer made his third debut for the Blues in a 1–1 draw against Bury on 21 January, coming on as a 69th-minute substitute replacing Kane Ferdinand.

After making sporadic appearances in the first team, Sawyer was released from Southend United at the end of his contract along with eleven other players.

=== Return to Woking ===
On 19 July 2012, Sawyer re-signed for Woking, at this point in the Conference Premier. He joined Dover Athletic on a two-month loan on 8 November 2013.

=== Sutton United ===
Sawyer's contract at Woking was cancelled by mutual consent on 19 December 2013, and he signed for Sutton United two days later.

=== Chelmsford City ===
Sawyer was released by Sutton United, with his three-month loan from Sutton officially expired he was allowed to sign for Chelmsford City. In 19 appearances he went on to score two goals, including the winner against the league leaders Basingstoke. At the end of the season, Mark Hawkes announced he would be signing a new deal for the 2015–16 season where he went on to make 36 appearances and scoring four goals. He signed a new deal under Rod Stringer, but later went on to sign for Bishop's Stortford.

== International career ==
Sawyer made his international debut for the England U-16s against Scotland in the Victory Shield in November 2004. He has played for the England U-18s and the England U-19s, scoring a goal for both teams. On 27 March 2007, he scored a volley in the England U-18 team's 4–1 victory over the Netherlands' U-18 team.
