= Johnny Herd =

English association football player

Personal information
- Full name: Johnathan James Herd
- Date of birth: 3 October 1989 (age 37)
- Place of birth: Huntingdon, England
- Height: 5 ft 9 in (1.75 m)
- Position: Defender

Team information
- Current team: St Ives Town

Youth career
- –2008: Southend United

Senior career*
Years	Team	Apps	(Gls)
2008–2011	Southend United	42	(0)
2011–2012	Ebbsfleet United	22	(1)
2012–2017	Bishop's Stortford	148	(2)
2017–2019	St Neots Town	72	(5)
2019–2022	Peterborough Sports		
2022	→ Mildenhall Town (loan)		
2022–	St Ives Town	0	(0)
- * Club domestic league appearances and goals as of 22:24, 19 July 2022 (UTC)

Johnathan James Herd (born 3 October 1989) is an English footballer who plays as a defender for St Ives Town.

== Playing career ==
Herd made his debut for Southend United away at Telford United, in the 2–2 draw in the FA Cup first round on 8 November 2008 .

He was in the Southend United starting line up for the FA Cup third-round game against Chelsea at Stamford Bridge. Southend's equaliser came from a Herd long throw, which was inadvertently flicked on by Ricardo Carvalho for Peter Clarke to score. In May 2011, he was one of five players told they were to be released by the club.

On 11 August 2011, Herd signed for Ebbsfleet United, and in early September he scored his first career goal in the away tie at Kidderminster Harriers in a 2–2 draw. Herd's appearances were less regular in the second half of the season due to the form of Joe Howe and he was released by Ebbsfleet at the end of the season. Following his release, Herd signed for Bishop's Stortford on a one-year deal.

On 20 January 2017, it was confirmed that Herd had joined St Neots Town. Following financial issues at the club, Herd signed for Southern League Division One Central side Peterborough Sports in February 2019. In March 2022, Herd joined Mildenhall Town on loan. Herd achieved two promotions with Peterborough Sports as they reached the National League North during his final season.

In July 2022, Herd joined St Ives Town.

== Personal life ==
He is the son of Andrew Herd who played as an Ewok and Jawa in the Star Wars trilogy Return of the Jedi, Also as a Gringotts Goblin in the Harry Potter trilogy Philosophers Stone and Deathly Hallows part 2. Johnny is also great-grandson of Fred Herd (Professional Golfer at St Andrews golf club Fyfe Scotland) who won the US Open golf championship in 1898.
