= Scott Spencer (footballer) =

English footballer

- Spencer whilst at Hyde in 2012

Personal information
- Full name: Scott Kernaghan Spencer
- Date of birth: 1 January 1989 (age 37)
- Place of birth: Manchester England
- Height: 5 ft 11 in (1.80 m)
- Position: Striker

Youth career
- 1999–2006: Oldham Athletic

Senior career*
| Years | Team | Apps | (Gls) |
| 2006–2009 | Everton | 0 | (0) |
| 2008 | → Yeovil Town (loan) | 0 | (0) |
| 2008 | → Macclesfield Town (loan) | 3 | (0) |
| 2009 | Rochdale | 4 | (0) |
| 2010–2011 | Southend United | 17 | (4) |
| 2011 | Lincoln City | 9 | (0) |
| 2011–2014 | Hyde | 102 | (50) |
| 2014 | → FC Halifax Town (loan) | 3 | (2) |
| 2014–2015 | Stockport County | 24 | (6) |
| 2015–2016 | Hyde | 6 | (6) |
| 2016 | Stockport County | 5 | (2) |
| 2016–2018 | Stalybridge Celtic | 0 | (0) |
| Total | | 173 | (70) |

International career
| 2008 | England U19 | ? | (?) |
| 2012–2013 | England C | 3 | (1) |
- * Club domestic league appearances and goals

Scott Kernaghan Spencer (born 1 January 1989) is an English footballer. He plays as a striker. He has also represented England U19s and the England C national teams.

Described as a 'wonderkid', he started his career at Oldham Athletic at the age of 10 working his way through the club's centre of excellence. In 2006, he moved to Everton for a fee of £220,000 and had loan spells with Yeovil Town and Macclesfield Town before being released by Everton just three years later in 2009. He then joined Rochdale on non-contract terms, later joining Southend United. He stayed for the remainder of the 2009–10 season and the start of the 2010–11 season, subsequently joining Lincoln City for the rest of the season before being released following the club's relegation from the Football League. After several trials, he eventually signed for Hyde. He received his first call-up to the England C national team in August 2011 whilst at Hyde. Scott’s younger brother Grant has also played professionally for a short period at Bolton before dropping to lower leagues and pub football.

Scott and his brother

== Career ==
=== Early career ===
Born in Oldham, Greater Manchester, Spencer joined Oldham Athletic's Centre of Excellence at the age of 10, signing an extended four-year contract with the club in November 2001. He continued his progress through the set-up at Oldham, rejecting a move to Bolton Wanderers in February 2005, to become a youth trainee with the club ahead of the 2005–06 season. His form for the club's Under-18 team attracted attention and the club agreed transfer terms with Everton for him in April 2006. He finally signed for Everton in May 2006, agreeing to a three-year contract with the club, joining for £220,000. Spencer joined Macclesfield Town on loan in March 2008 and made his debut against Brentford on 8 March. He was released by Everton on 1 July 2009.

=== Rochdale and Southend ===
On 14 August it was announced that Spencer had signed on non-contract terms for Rochdale. Spencer was released from Rochdale and later signed a six-month contract for Southend United in the January transfer window of 2010 after impressing on trial. Spencer made his first appearance as a substitute against Huddersfield Town on 16 January 2010 in a 2–1 defeat, Spencer scored the only Southend goal. He had to wait another two games for another goal, when he scored in a 2–2 draw with Swindon Town. Spencer only scored two more goals in the 2009–10 season, against Walsall and Bristol Rovers. After six appearances and no goals for Spencer at the start of the 2010–11 season, he was released from his contract at the club on 28 January 2011.

=== Lincoln City ===
After his release by Southend he re-united with his former manager from Southend, Steve Tilson, after moving to Lincoln City on 31 January. He made his debut in a 2–1 win over Bradford City on 1 February, but after another eight games with no goals for Spencer, he was released by the club in May after the club's relegation from the Football League. In July he joined up with Barrow on a trial basis, scoring the club's second goal in their 2–0 friendly win over his former club Oldham on 9 July. However he was not offered a contract with the club and underwent further trials with Southport, helping the club secure the Liverpool Senior Cup with a 2–0 win over his former club Everton, and then a final trial with FC Halifax Town.

=== Hyde ===
Spencer whilst at Hyde in 2011

He signed for Hyde on 12 August 2011. He made his debut just a day later in a 2–1 win over Worcester City, winning a penalty and scoring it himself. Spencer scored all four of Hyde's goals in a 4–0 victory away at Corby Town on 20 August. He carried on his good start for Hyde by scoring again when Hyde played Hinckley United in late August 2011. His seven goals in just four games earned him his first call-up to the England C team, which was announced on 23 August.

After going nine games without a goal, he scored on his return from injury in a 4–1 win over Eastwood Town in December 2011. He scored again the following game, in a 2–1 defeat to Boston United, before he scored his second four-goal haul of the season, scoring all four in a 4–2 win over Vauxhall Motors. On 30 December 2011, he signed a contract with the club, before assisting Hyde's first goal, and scoring their second and his 20th of the season as Hyde came out 3–1 winners at Stalybridge on New Year's Day. He finished the 2011–12 season having played 37 games in all competitions scoring 32 goals, helping Hyde to the Conference North league title.

He started the 2012–13 Conference National season with two goals in the opening game, netting twice in a 2–2 draw with Braintree Town. He finished the season with ten goals in 35 games in all competitions. He scored his first brace of the 2013–14 season in October in a 4–3 away defeat to Dartford. After 31 games scoring eight times in the season, he was sent out on loan to league rivals FC Halifax Town on 27 March 2014.

=== Stockport County ===
On 1 July 2014, he joined Stockport County.

=== Hyde United ===
In February 2016, Spencer was handed a three-month suspension by The Football Association, of which two-months where suspended until 1 October 2017, for failing to immediately report an "approach by a third party related to seeking to influence the outcome or conduct of a match or competition". The FA also stated, "the three players were not involved in any attempt to fix matches and did not accept monies or gifts".

=== Stockport County ===
He then rejoined former club Stockport.

=== Stalybridge Celtic ===
In October 2016 he joined Stalybridge Celtic.

== Style of play ==
He plays as a striker and was tipped to reach the top of the game when he left Oldham Athletic for Everton. Spencer was also described as a 'wonderkid'. After scoring all four goals in a 4–0 away win against Corby Town for Hyde, he was described as an "undoubted star".

== Personal life ==
As well as playing football, Spencer works for his parents, helping out in their family cleaning business two days a week.

== Career statistics ==
As of 30 March 2014.

| Club | Season | League | | FA Cup | | League Cup | | Other | | Total | |
| Club | Season | Apps | Goals | Apps | Goals | Apps | Goals | Apps | Goals | Apps | Goals |
|---|---|---|---|---|---|---|---|---|---|---|---|
| Everton | 2006–07 | 0 | 0 | 0 | 0 | 0 | 0 | 0 | 0 | 0 | 0 |
| Everton | 2007–08 | 0 | 0 | 0 | 0 | 0 | 0 | 0 | 0 | 0 | 0 |
| Yeovil Town (loan) | 2007–08 | 0 | 0 | 0 | 0 | 0 | 0 | 0 | 0 | 0 | 0 |
| Macclesfield Town (loan) | 2007–08 | 3 | 0 | 0 | 0 | 0 | 0 | 0 | 0 | 3 | 0 |
| Everton | 2008–09 | 0 | 0 | 0 | 0 | 0 | 0 | 0 | 0 | 0 | 0 |
| Everton | Total | 3 | 0 | 0 | 0 | 0 | 0 | 0 | 0 | 3 | 0 |
| Rochdale | 2009–10 | 4 | 0 | 0 | 0 | 0 | 0 | 1 | 0 | 5 | 0 |
| Southend United | 2009–10 | 12 | 4 | 0 | 0 | 0 | 0 | 0 | 0 | 12 | 4 |
| Southend United | 2010–11 | 5 | 0 | 0 | 0 | 1 | 0 | 0 | 0 | 6 | 0 |
| Southend United | Total | 21 | 4 | 0 | 0 | 1 | 0 | 1 | 0 | 23 | 4 |
| Lincoln City | 2010–11 | 9 | 0 | 0 | 0 | 0 | 0 | 0 | 0 | 9 | 0 |
| Hyde | 2011–12 | 36 | 32 | 2 | 0 | 0 | 0 | 4 | 2 | 42 | 34 |
| Hyde | 2012–13 | 35 | 10 | 0 | 0 | 0 | 0 | 2 | 0 | 37 | 10 |
| Hyde | 2013–14 | 31 | 8 | 0 | 0 | 0 | 0 | 2 | 0 | 33 | 8 |
| Hyde | Total | 102 | 50 | 2 | 0 | 0 | 0 | 6 | 2 | 110 | 52 |
| Career totals | | 135 | 54 | 2 | 0 | 1 | 0 | 7 | 2 | 145 | 56 |
