= Ian Joyce =

American soccer player (born 1985)

Personal information
- Full name: Ian Francis Joyce
- Date of birth: July 12, 1985 (age 41)
- Place of birth: Kinnelon, New Jersey, United States
- Height: 6 ft 3 in (1.91 m)
- Position: Goalkeeper

Youth career
- 2003–2006: Seton Hall Pirates

Senior career*
Years	Team	Apps	(Gls)
2007	Grays Athletic	0	(0)
2007	Harlow Town	?	(?)
2007–2008	Watford	0	(0)
2008–2010	Southend United	5	(0)
2010–2012	Colorado Rapids	1	(0)
Total		6	(0)
- * Club domestic league appearances and goals as of 17:59, 2 July 2016 (UTC)

Ian Francis Joyce (born July 12, 1985) is an American soccer player who most recently played for Major League Soccer club Colorado Rapids.

== Career ==
Born in Kinnelon, New Jersey, Joyce played high school soccer at Don Bosco Preparatory High School in Ramsey, New Jersey.

Joyce made his debut for Southend United away to Crewe Alexandra, in the 4–3 win in League One on September 20, 2008. He stepped in for the injured Steve Mildenhall, who was declared to be out for up to four weeks after damage to his knee in the previous game. He came on as a half-time sub in Southend's 3–1 win over Brighton & Hove Albion on March 10, 2009, after Steve Mildenhall sustained a minor knee injury. Joyce also started Southend's next game, in the 1–0 victory against Hereford United on 14 March.

Southend United and Joyce mutually agreed to terminate his contract at Roots Hall and on March 9, 2010, he signed for Major League Soccer club Colorado Rapids. He played his first MLS match on August 28, 2010, and helped the Rapids to a 3–0 victory over Houston Dynamo.

Joyce was released by Colorado on November 16, 2012. He entered the 2012 MLS Re-Entry Draft in December 2012 and became a free agent after he went undrafted in both rounds of the draft.

== Personal ==
Joyce was eligible to play in countries within the European Union as he holds an Italian passport.
