= Jean-François Christophe =

French association football player (born 1987)

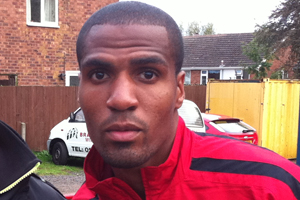
- Christophe in 2011

Personal information
- Date of birth: 27 June 1987 (age 39)
- Place of birth: Creil, France
- Height: 1.86 m (6 ft 1 in)
- Position: Midfielder

Team information
- Current team: Boussu Dour Borinage

Youth career
- –2007: RC Lens

Senior career*
Years	Team	Apps	(Gls)
2007–2008	Portsmouth	0	(0)
2007–2008	→ AFC Bournemouth (loan)	10	(1)
2008	→ Yeovil Town (loan)	5	(0)
2008	→ Southend United (loan)	14	(1)
2008–2010	Southend United	55	(4)
2010	Oldham Athletic	1	(0)
2010–2011	AFC Compiègne	3	(0)
2011–2012	Lincoln City	27	(2)
2012–2013	KVK Tienen	15	(4)
2013	CS Avion	12	(1)
2013–2015	Boussu Dour Borinage	17	(3)
2015–2016	Arras FA	14	(?)
2016–	US Vimy		
- * Club domestic league appearances and goals as of 16:30, 18 October 2013 (UTC)

Jean-François Christophe (born 27 June 1987) is a French footballer who plays for Boussu Dour Borinage in Belgian Second Division.

== Career ==
Christophe began his career at Ligue 1 club RC Lens. In the summer 2007 transfer window he was signed by English club Portsmouth. In 2007, he was sent out on loan to AFC Bournemouth, and then he spent time on loan at League One club Yeovil Town.

On 1 September 2008 he joined League One club Southend United for an initial one-month loan, After an impressive start with the club, the deal with extended firstly for a second month and then a third and final month. A hamstring injury curtailed the third month but he returned to Roots Hall on a permanent basis on 31 December 2008, agreeing a two-and-a-half-year deal with the club. Christophe scored with a bicycle kick in Southend's 2–1 win at Peterborough United on 28 February 2009; the goal was later voted Southend's goal of the season.

On 30 July 2010 Christophe, along with fellow Frenchman Francis Laurent, had their contracts cancelled by mutual consent.

On 6 August 2010, he appeared as a trialist for Conference club Wrexham in their 0–0 friendly draw against Stoke City.

On 24 September 2010 Christophe signed on non-contract forms with League One club Oldham Athletic. He made his only appearance for the club as a substitute on 9 October 2010 in a League One match against Brentford. before leaving the club on 3 November 2010. After discussions with the management, he decided to try and further his career back in France, signing for Compiègne on 5 November 2010 with his clearance reaching the club a week later. On 22 August 2011 he joined Lincoln City.

For the 2012–13 season he joined K.V.K. Tienen linking up with his former teammates Francis Laurent and Jean Arnaud.
