= Francis Laurent =

French footballer (born 1986)

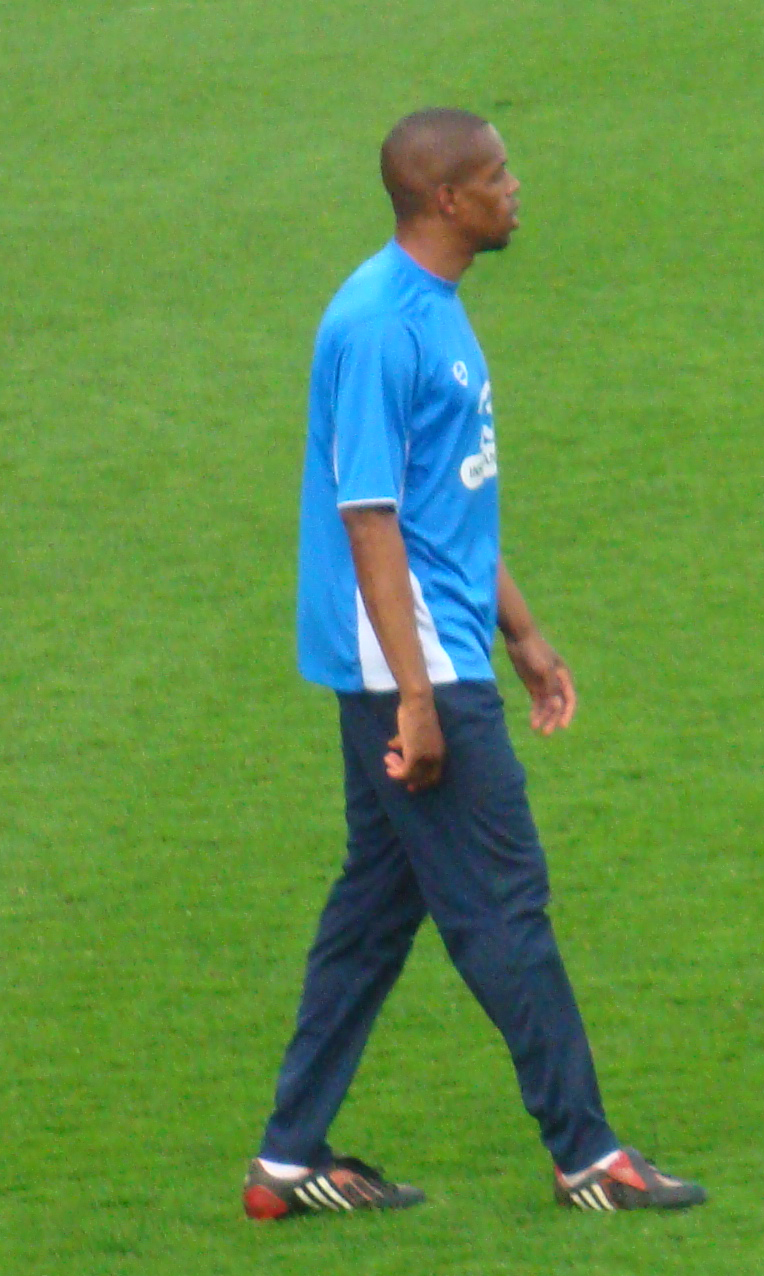
- Laurent in 2009

Personal information
- Date of birth: 6 January 1986 (age 40)
- Place of birth: Paris, France
- Height: 6 ft 3 in (1.91 m)
- Positions: Striker; winger

Senior career*
Years	Team	Apps	(Gls)
2005–2006	FC Sochaux-Montbéliard B	12	(0)
2006–2007	SV Eintracht Trier 05	14	(4)
2007–2008	1. FSV Mainz 05 II	25	(7)
2007–2008	1. FSV Mainz 05	6	(0)
2008–2010	Southend United	56	(9)
2010–2011	AFC Compiègne	3	(0)
2011	Northampton Town	6	(0)
2011–2012	Lincoln City	14	(1)
2012	K.V.K. Tienen	15	(0)
2013–2014	FC Chambly	29	(5)
Total		180	(26)
- * Club domestic league appearances and goals

Francis Laurent (born 6 January 1986) is a French footballer who last played for FC Chambly.

== Career ==
Laurent started his career in his native France signing for FC Sochaux where he made twelve appearances in his first season. He took the decision to pursue his career in Germany, moving to SV Eintracht, scoring four goals in 14 games. He then went on to sign for 1. FSV Mainz 05 where his development as a player continued.

Laurent signed a one-year contract with Southend United on 28 August 2008, following an impressive trial. On 18 October 2008, he came off the bench for his first league appearance and scored the match winner in the 71st minute heading in Peter Clarke's cross. His contract was extended in December to a 2 1/2-year deal. Laurent left Southend at the end of the 2009–10 season.

Laurent appeared as a trialist for Coventry City in a pre-season friendly against West Bromwich Albion on 31 July 2010, making an appearance in the 57th minute. Laurent also had a pre season trials with Sheffield United and Cardiff City, during which he scored a hat-trick in a reserve team fixture against Llanelli.

Laurent returned to France and signed a short-term contract with AFC Compiègne on 1 October 2010. On 14 January 2011, he joined Northampton Town on a free transfer until the end of the season, with an option to increase the deal until the end of next season.

At the start of the 2011–12 season, Laurent joined Conference National club Lincoln City in July 2011. On 8 June 2012, he seemed set for Doxa but instead joined K.V.K. Tienen linking up with his former teammates Jean-Francois Christophe and Jean Arnaud.
