= List of Southend United F.C. players =

This is a list of notable footballers who have played for Southend United. The aim is for this list to include all players that have played 200 or more senior matches for the club. Other players who have played an important role for the club can be included, but the reason why they have been included should be added in the "Notes" column.

For a list of all Southend United players, major or minor, with a Wikipedia article, see Category:Southend United F.C. players, and for the current squad see the main Southend United F.C. article.

Players are listed according to the date of their first team debut. Appearances and goals are for first-team competitive matches only; wartime matches are excluded. Substitute appearances included.

== Table ==
| Name | Nationality | Position | Southend career | Appearances | Goals | Notes |
|---|---|---|---|---|---|---|
| Alan Moody | England | DF | 1972–1984 | 504 | 44 | Only Blues player to reach 500 appearances |
| Sandy Anderson | England | DF | 1950–1963 | 483 | 8 | 1st Blues player to reach 400 appearances |
| Kevin Maher | Republic of Ireland | MF | 1998–2008 | 455 | 24 | |
| Tony Bentley | England | DF | 1961–1971 | 417 | 17 | |
| Ron Pountney | England | MF | 1975–1985 | 378 | 35 | |
| Paul Sansome | England | GK | 1988–1997 | 357 | 0 | |
| Darryl Flahavan | England | GK | 2000–2008 | 348 | 0 | |
| Dave Robinson | England | | 1928–? | 348 | 1 | |
| Harry Threadgold | England | GK | 1953–1963 | 343 | 0 | |
| Paul Clark | England | DF | 1976–1977, 1982–1991 | 342 | 7 | |
| Micky Stead | England | DF | 1978–1985 | 340 | 5 | |
| Dickie Donoven | England | | 1925–1935 | 332 | 58 | 1st Blues player to reach 300 appearances |
| Tony Hadley | England | DF | 1974–1983, 1984–1985 | 313 | 21 | |
| Billy Moore | England | | 1925–1936 | 304 | 0 | |
| John McKinven | Scotland | MF | 1960–1969 | 303 | 66 | |
| Chris Powell | England | DF | 1990–1996 | 288 | 3 | |
| Jimmy Lawler | Republic of Ireland | | 1949–1957 | 288 | 17 | |
| Arthur Williamson | Scotland | DF | 1955–1961 | 287 | 2 | |
| Adam Barrett | England | DF | 2004–2010, 2015– | 286 | 29 | |
| Glenn Pennyfather | England | MF | 1981–1987 | 266 | 43 | |
| Lou Costello | England | MF | 1957–1965 | 265 | 15 | |
| Tommy Dixon | England | | 1927–1934 | 265 | 7 | |
| Peter Watson | England | FW | 1959–1966 | 263 | 3 | |
| Roy Hollis | England | FW | 1954–1960 | 260 | 135 | |
| David Martin | England | DF | 1954–1960 | 260 | 28 | |
| Steve Yates | England | DF | 1977–1983 | 253 | 9 | |
| Billy Best | Scotland | FW | 1968–1973 | 246 | 123 | He holds the record for the quickest five goals scored in succession in the F.A. Cup |
| Harry Lane | England | FW | 1933–1938, 1946–1949 | 245 | 75 | |
| Mervyn Cawston | England | GK | 1974, 1978–1984 | 242 | 0 | |
| Spencer Prior | England | DF | 1987–1993, 2004–2006 | 241 | 7 | |
| Roy McDonough | England | FW | 1983–1984, 1985–1990 | 238 | 44 | |
| Mickey Jones | Wales | | 1929–1936 | 236 | 30 | |
| Jimmy Stirling | Scotland | DF | 1950–196 | 233 | 2 | |
| Jimmy McAlinden | Ireland / Republic of Ireland | DF | 1948–1954 | 231 | 13 | |
| Steve Tilson | England | MF | 1989–1997, 2002–2004 | 228 | 31 | |
| Mark Gower | England | MF | 2003–2008 | 227 | 38 | |
| Joe Sibley | England | | 1937–1947, 1950–1956 | 226 | 44 | |
| Sammy McCrory | Northern Ireland | FW | 1955–1960 | 222 | 99 | Part of the Northern Ireland's 1958 FIFA World Cup squad |
| Dave Cusack | England | DF | 1978–1983 | 212 | 20 | |

As of 25 May 2013.
