= 1996–97 Southend United F.C. season =

Southend United
1996–97 season
- Chairman: Vic Jobson
- Manager: Ronnie Whelan
- Stadium: Roots Hall
- Football League First Division: 24th (relegated)
- FA Cup: Third round
- League Cup: First round
- Top goalscorer: League: Boere/Rammell (9); All: Rammell (10)
- Highest home attendance: 8,707 vs. Manchester City (29 October 1996)
- Lowest home attendance: 3,305 vs. Grimsby Town (16 October 1996)
- Average home league attendance: 5,176

During the 1996–97 English football season, Southend United F.C. competed in the Football League First Division.

== Season summary ==
The 1996–97 season was a big struggle for Southend as they suffered relegation after finishing bottom of Division One. Ronnie Whelan left the club and he openly admitted when he took the job he didn't know the first thing about being a manager.

== Final league table ==
Pos	Team	Pld	W	D	L	GF	GA	GD	Pts	Qualification or relegation
20	Huddersfield Town	46	13	15	18	48	61	−13	54	
21	Bradford City	46	12	12	22	47	72	−25	48	
22	Grimsby Town (R)	46	11	13	22	59	81	−22	46	Relegation to the Second Division
23	Oldham Athletic (R)	46	10	13	23	51	66	−15	43	Relegation to the Second Division
24	Southend United (R)	46	8	15	23	42	85	−43	39	Relegation to the Second Division

Rules for classification: 1) Points; 2) Goals scored; 3) Goal difference
(R) Relegated

== Results ==
Southend United's score comes first

=== Legend ===
Win	Draw	Loss

=== Football League First Division ===
Date	Opponent	Venue	Result	Attendance	Scorers
17 August 1996	Tranmere Rovers	H	1–1	4,264	Rammell
24 August 1996	Oxford United	A	0–5	6,382	
27 August 1996	Portsmouth	A	0–1	5,579	
31 August 1996	Swindon Town	H	1–3	4,011	Byrne
7 September 1996	Bolton Wanderers	H	5–2	4,475	Boere (2), Nielsen, Williams, Marsh
10 September 1996	Charlton Athletic	A	0–2	8,497	
14 September 1996	Norwich City	A	0–0	12,461	
21 September 1996	Port Vale	H	0–0	4,025	
28 September 1996	Crystal Palace	A	1–6	14,858	Williams
1 October 1996	Sheffield United	H	3–2	3,716	Boere (2), Marsh
5 October 1996	Bradford City	A	0–0	10,156	
13 October 1996	Wolverhampton Wanderers	H	1–1	5,550	Marsh
16 October 1996	Grimsby Town	H	1–0	3,305	Tilson
19 October 1996	Huddersfield Town	A	0–0	9,578	
26 October 1996	Oldham Athletic	A	0–0	6,606	
29 October 1996	Manchester City	H	2–3	8,707	Williams, Rammell
2 November 1996	Reading	H	2–1	5,002	Nielsen, Marsh (pen)
9 November 1996	Ipswich Town	A	1–1	10,146	Rammell
16 November 1996	West Bromwich Albion	H	2–3	5,120	Rammell, Williams
23 November 1996	Stoke City	A	2–1	12,821	Williams, Sigurðsson (own goal)
30 November 1996	Oldham Athletic	H	1–1	5,001	Nielsen
7 December 1996	Barnsley	A	0–3	7,483	
14 December 1996	Queens Park Rangers	A	0–4	11,117	
20 December 1996	Birmingham City	H	1–1	5,100	Williams
26 December 1996	Charlton Athletic	H	0–2	7,508	
28 December 1996	Bolton Wanderers	A	1–3	16,357	Rammell
18 January 1997	Sheffield United	A	0–3	15,049	
25 January 1997	Port Vale	A	1–2	5,588	Thomson
28 January 1997	Crystal Palace	H	2–1	5,061	Thomson, Boere
1 February 1997	Ipswich Town	H	0–0	7,232	
8 February 1997	Manchester City	A	0–3	26,261	
15 February 1997	Stoke City	H	2–1	4,625	Thomson, Rammell
22 February 1997	Reading	A	2–3	7,683	Boere (2)
25 February 1997	Norwich City	H	1–1	5,169	Thomson
1 March 1997	Barnsley	H	1–2	4,855	Thomson
5 March 1997	West Bromwich Albion	A	0–2	16,125	
8 March 1997	Birmingham City	A	1–2	13,189	Marsh
15 March 1997	Queens Park Rangers	H	0–1	6,747	
22 March 1997	Oxford United	H	2–2	4,102	Boere, Lapper
28 March 1997	Tranmere Rovers	A	0–3	7,563	
31 March 1997	Portsmouth	H	2–1	6,107	Gridelet, Rammell
5 April 1997	Swindon Town	A	0–0	6,730	
12 April 1997	Bradford City	H	1–1	6,697	Rammell
19 April 1997	Wolverhampton Wanderers	A	1–4	25,095	Rammell
26 April 1997	Huddersfield Town	H	1–2	4,762	Boere
4 May 1997	Grimsby Town	A	0–4	7,367	

=== FA Cup ===
Round	Date	Opponent	Venue	Result	Attendance	Goalscorers
R3	15 January 1997	Leicester City	A	0–2	13,982	

=== League Cup ===
Round	Date	Opponent	Venue	Result	Attendance	Goalscorers
R1 First Leg	20 August 1996	Fulham	H	0–2	3,084	
R1 Second Leg	3 September 1996	Fulham	A	2–1 (lost 2–3 on agg)	4,297	Nielsen, Rammell

== Squad ==
Note: Flags indicate national team as defined under FIFA eligibility rules; some limited exceptions apply. Players may hold more than one non-FIFA nationality.

No.	Pos.	Nation	Player
-	GK	(England) ENG	Simon Royce
-	DF	(England) ENG	Keith Dublin
-	DF	(England) ENG	Mark McNally
-	DF	(England) ENG	Leo Roget
-	DF	(South Africa) RSA	Andy Harris
-	MF	(England) ENG	Mike Marsh
-	FW	(England) ENG	Andy Rammell
-	MF	(England) ENG	Steve Tilson
-	DF	(England) ENG	Mark Stimson
-	FW	(Netherlands) NED	Jeroen Boere
-	MF	(England) ENG	Julian Hails
-	MF	(England) ENG	Adrian Clarke (on loan from Arsenal)
-	MF	(Republic of Ireland) IRL	Paul Byrne
-	GK	(England) ENG	Paul Sansome

No.	Pos.	Nation	Player
-	FW	(Scotland) SCO	Andy Thomson
-	MF	(England) ENG	Phil Gridelet
-	MF	(England) ENG	Ian Selley (on loan from Arsenal)
-	FW	(England) ENG	Paul Williams
-	MF	(England) ENG	Mark Patterson (on loan from Sheffield United)
-	DF	(United States) USA	Mike Lapper
-	MF	(England) ENG	Robert Codner
-	FW	(England) ENG	Ritchie Hanlon
-	GK	(Denmark) DEN	Tony Henriksen
-	MF	(Denmark) DEN	John Nielsen
-	MF	(Australia) AUS	Adem Poric (on loan from Sheffield Wednesday)
-	FW	(Denmark) DEN	Peter Dursun
-	MF	(England) ENG	Mark Jones
-	MF	(England) ENG	Andy Sussex
