= List of Southend United F.C. seasons =

Southend United Football Club, an English association football club based in Southend, Essex, was founded in 1906. The club's first team won the Southern League Second Division championship in their first season. Southend had to apply for election alongside the two bottom First Division teams who were applying for re-election, and were unsuccessful. Southend won the title again the following year, and this time, with more places available after two clubs had joined the Football League, they were elected. By 1910–11, the Southern League had adopted automatic promotion and relegation, and Southend were relegated. They returned to the top tier as runners-up in 1912–13, and remained at that level until 1920, when the Football League added a Third Division made up almost entirely of the Southern League First Division teams. That same season, Southend reached the third round (last 16) of the FA Cup; they have progressed to the last 16 four times since, but have gone no further.

Southend remained in the Third Division for the next 39 seasons. The closest they came to a change were via two successful application for re-election, in 1921–22, their second season as a Football League club, and then in 1934–35, and two third-place finishes, in 1931–32 and 1949–50, at a time when only the divisional champions were promoted. In 1965–66, they were relegated to the Fourth Division, and spent the next 25 years oscillating between the two. Southend's first trophy in the Football League came in 1980–81, courtesy of a strong defence and a particularly strong home record, as they won the Fourth Division title by a two-point margin. Eight years later, they were again promoted from the fourth tier, this time in third place, and the following season, a final-day defeat deprived Southend of the title but they were still sure of the runners-up spot that gained promotion to the second tier for the first time in the club's history. Southend spent six seasons at the higher level, during which time they lost a penalty shoot-out to Notts County in the semi-final of the 1993–94 Anglo-Italian Cup, before two consecutive relegations took them back whence they came.

In 2006–07, again after consecutive promotions, they played one more season in the Championship – the Football League's divisions had been rebranded two years earlier – and produced their best League Cup performance, eliminating Manchester United in the fourth round before losing to Tottenham Hotspur in the quarter-final via an not so arguably offside goal scored five minutes from the end of extra time. Southend reached the final of the Football League Trophy, a cup competition open to teams in the lower divisions of the Football League, in both 2004 and 2005. Both finals were played at the Millennium Stadium while the new Wembley Stadium was under construction, and both ended in defeat by two goals to nil, to Blackpool in 2004 and Wrexham the following year. They repeated the procedure in 2013, albeit this time at the new Wembley, losing 2–0 to Crewe Alexandra and equalling Brentford's record of three final appearances without winning. Financial issues mounted in the 2019–20 season: against a background of non-payment of wages, unpaid taxes, winding-up orders and a transfer embargo meant Southend were unable to avoid relegation to League Two, and even when the tax bill was paid after the sale of the stadium for housing, a 23rd-place finish in 2020–21 meant that Southend United dropped out of the League after 101 years' continuous membership. The financial and ownership issues continued: during the 2023–24 season, the National League imposed a 10-point deduction for the club's failure to clear a tax debt, without which they would have finished in the play-off positions, and the latest winding-up petition was withdrawn in June 2024.

Since their admission to the Football League, and as of the end of the 2023–24 season, the team have spent 7 seasons in the second tier of the English football league system, 61 in the third, 26 in the fourth and 3 in non-league football. The table details the team's achievements and the top goalscorer in senior first-team competitions from their debut season in the Southern League in 1906–07 to the end of the most recently completed season.

== Key ==
Key to league record:

- P – Played
- W – Games won
- D – Games drawn
- L – Games lost
- F – Goals for
- A – Goals against
- Pts – Points
- Pos – Final position

Key to colours and symbols:

| 1st or W | Winners |
| 2nd or F | Runners-up |
| ↑ | Promoted |
| ↓ | Relegated |
| ♦ | Top league scorer in Southend's division |

Key to divisions:

- South 1 – Southern Football League First Division
- South 2 – Southern Football League Second Division
- Div 1 – Football League First Division
- Div 2 – Football League Second Division
- Div 3 – Football League Third Division
- Div 4 – Football League Fourth Division
- Champ – Football League Championship
- League 1 – Football League One, EFL League One
- League 2 – Football League Two, EFL League Two
- National – National League

Key to stages of competitions:

- Group – Group stage
- Prelim – Preliminary round
- QR1 – First qualifying round
- QR2 – Second qualifying round, etc.
- R1 – First round
- R2 – Second round, etc.
- QF – Quarter-final
- SF – Semi-final
- F – Runners-up
- W – Winners
- (S) – Southern section of regionalised stage

Details of the abandoned 1939–40 season are shown in italics and appropriately footnoted.

== Seasons ==
List of seasons, including league division and statistics, cup results, and top scorer(s)
| Season | League | | | | | | | | | FA Cup | League Cup (Note: The League Cup competition started in the 1960–61 season.) | Other | | Top scorer(s) (Note: Includes goals scored in all nationally organised competitions, i.e. the Football League, including play-offs, National League, FA Cup, Football League Cup, Third Division South Cup, Football League Group Cup, Associate Members' Cup / Football League Trophy / EFL Trophy, Full Members' Cup, Anglo-Italian Cup and FA Trophy. For seasons from 1920–21 to 2009–10, sourced to the English National Football Archive; Football League seasons thereafter, to Soccerbase; for National League season, to Soccerway.) | |
| Season | Division (Note: From the 1920–21 Football League season onwards, divisions are sorted according to their level within the English football league system, and separately from the pre-Football League divisions.) | P | W | D | L | F | A | Pts | Pos | FA Cup | League Cup | Competition | Result | Name | Goals |
|---|---|---|---|---|---|---|---|---|---|---|---|---|---|---|---|
| 1906–07 | South 2 | 22 | 14 | 5 | 3 | 58 | 23 | 33 | 1st | — | — | — | — | Not known | — |
| 1907–08 | South 2 ↑ | 18 | 13 | 3 | 2 | 47 | 16 | 29 | 1st | QR4 | — | — | — | Not known | — |
| 1908–09 | South 1 | 40 | 14 | 10 | 16 | 52 | 54 | 38 | 12th | QR5 | — | — | — | Not known | — |
| 1909–10 | South 1 | 42 | 12 | 9 | 21 | 51 | 90 | 33 | 20th | R2 | — | — | — | Not known | — |
| 1910–11 | South 1 ↓ | 38 | 10 | 9 | 19 | 47 | 64 | 29 | 19th | R1 | — | — | — | Not known | — |
| 1911–12 | South 2 | 26 | 16 | 1 | 9 | 73 | 24 | 33 | 4th | QR5 | — | — | — | Not known | — |
| 1912–13 | South 2 ↑ | 24 | 14 | 6 | 4 | 43 | 23 | 34 | 2nd | R1 | — | — | — | Not known | — |
| 1913–14 | South 1 | 38 | 10 | 12 | 16 | 41 | 66 | 32 | 16th | R1 | — | — | — | Not known | — |
| 1914–15 | South 1 | 38 | 10 | 8 | 20 | 44 | 64 | 28 | 18th | R2 | — | — | — | Not known | — |
| 1915–19 | The Southern League and FA Cup were suspended until after the First World War. | | | | | | | | | | | | | | |
| 1919–20 | South 1 | 42 | 13 | 17 | 12 | 46 | 48 | 43 | 11th | R1 | — | — | — | Not known | — |
| 1920–21 | Div 3 | 42 | 14 | 8 | 20 | 44 | 61 | 36 | 17th | R3 | — | — | — | Albert Fairclough | 15 |
| 1921–22 | Div 3S | 42 | 8 | 11 | 23 | 34 | 74 | 27 | 22nd (Note: Successfully applied for re-election to the Football League.) | R2 | — | — | — | Jimmy Evans (Note: All of Evans' goals were penalty kicks.) | 10 |
| 1922–23 | Div 3S | 42 | 12 | 13 | 17 | 49 | 54 | 37 | 15th | QR5 | — | — | — | Billy Goodwin | 22 |
| 1923–24 | Div 3S | 42 | 12 | 10 | 20 | 53 | 84 | 34 | 19th | QR6 | — | — | — | Billy Goodwin | 11 |
| 1924–25 | Div 3S | 42 | 19 | 5 | 18 | 51 | 61 | 43 | 10th | QR5 | — | — | — | Jimmy McClelland | 21 |
| 1925–26 | Div 3S | 42 | 19 | 4 | 19 | 78 | 73 | 42 | 11th | R5 | — | — | — | William Shaw | 21 |
| 1926–27 | Div 3S | 42 | 14 | 6 | 22 | 64 | 77 | 34 | 19th | R2 | — | — | — | Billy Hick | 29 |
| 1927–28 | Div 3S | 42 | 20 | 6 | 16 | 80 | 64 | 46 | 7th | R2 | — | — | — | Billy Hick | 26 |
| 1928–29 | Div 3S | 42 | 15 | 11 | 16 | 80 | 75 | 41 | 12th | R1 | — | — | — | Jimmy Shankly | 35 |
| 1929–30 | Div 3S | 42 | 15 | 13 | 14 | 69 | 59 | 43 | 11th | R2 | — | — | — | Fred Baron | 22 |
| 1930–31 | Div 3S | 42 | 22 | 5 | 15 | 76 | 60 | 49 | 5th | R1 | — | — | — | Jimmy Shankly | 28 |
| 1931–32 | Div 3S | 42 | 21 | 11 | 10 | 77 | 53 | 53 | 3rd | R2 | — | — | — | Jimmy Shankly | 20 |
| 1932–33 | Div 3S | 42 | 15 | 11 | 16 | 65 | 82 | 41 | 13th | R4 | — | — | — | Jack Morfitt | 21 |
| 1933–34 | Div 3S | 42 | 12 | 10 | 20 | 51 | 74 | 34 | 16th | R3 | — | Third Division South Cup | R2 | Leo Stevens | 21 |
| 1934–35 | Div 3S | 42 | 11 | 9 | 22 | 65 | 78 | 31 | 21st | R3 | — | Third Division South Cup | R1 | Harry Johnson | 22 |
| 1935–36 | Div 3S | 42 | 13 | 10 | 19 | 61 | 62 | 36 | 18th | R3 | — | Third Division South Cup | QF | Harry Lane | 17 |
| 1936–37 | Div 3S | 42 | 17 | 11 | 14 | 78 | 67 | 45 | 10th | R2 | — | Third Division South Cup | R2 | Billy Dickinson | 19 |
| 1937–38 | Div 3S | 42 | 15 | 10 | 17 | 70 | 68 | 40 | 12th | R3 | — | Third Division South Cup | R1 | Tudor Martin | 18 |
| 1938–39 | Div 3S | 42 | 16 | 9 | 17 | 61 | 64 | 41 | 12th | R4 | — | Third Division South Cup | R1 | Alf Smirk | 18 |
| 1939–40 | Div 3S | 3 | 1 | 1 | 1 | 3 | 3 | 3 | — (Note: The 1939–40 Football League season was abandoned with three matches played when the Second World War began.) | — | — | — | — | Sam Bell; Jack Ormandy; and one own goal | 1 |
| 1939–45 | The Football League and FA Cup were suspended until after the Second World War. | | | | | | | | | | | | | | |
| 1945–46 | — | — | — | — | — | — | — | — | — | R1 (Note: Although the Football League did not resume until the 1946–47 season, the FA Cup was contested in 1945–46. From the first round proper to the sixth round (quarter-final), results were determined on aggregate score over two legs.) | — | — | — | Alf Smirk | 1 |
| 1946–47 | Div 3S | 42 | 17 | 10 | 15 | 71 | 60 | 44 | 8th | R3 | — | — | — | Cyril Thompson | 27 |
| 1947–48 | Div 3S | 42 | 15 | 13 | 14 | 51 | 58 | 43 | 9th | R1 | — | — | — | Cyril Thompson | 14 |
| 1948–49 | Div 3S | 42 | 9 | 16 | 17 | 41 | 46 | 34 | 18th | R1 | — | — | — | Frank Dudley | 12 |
| 1949–50 | Div 3S | 42 | 19 | 13 | 10 | 66 | 48 | 51 | 3rd | R3 | — | — | — | Albert Wakefield | 28 |
| 1950–51 | Div 3S | 46 | 21 | 10 | 15 | 92 | 69 | 52 | 7th | R1 | — | — | — | Les Stubbs | 19 |
| 1951–52 | Div 3S | 46 | 19 | 10 | 17 | 75 | 66 | 48 | 9th | R5 | — | — | — | Albert Wakefield | 21 |
| 1952–53 | Div 3S | 46 | 18 | 13 | 15 | 69 | 74 | 49 | 8th | R1 | — | — | — | Cyril Grant | 13 |
| 1953–54 | Div 3S | 46 | 18 | 7 | 21 | 69 | 71 | 43 | 16th | R2 | — | — | — | Ken Bainbridge | 12 |
| 1954–55 | Div 3S | 46 | 17 | 12 | 17 | 83 | 80 | 46 | 10th | R3 | — | — | — | Roy Hollis | 32 |
| 1955–56 | Div 3S | 46 | 21 | 11 | 14 | 88 | 80 | 53 | 4th | R4 | — | — | — | Roy Hollis | 26 |
| 1956–57 | Div 3S | 46 | 18 | 12 | 16 | 73 | 65 | 48 | 7th | R4 | — | — | — | Roy Hollis | 20 |
| 1957–58 | Div 3S (Note: Southend's top-half finish meant they were placed in the Football League Third Division when the regional sections were amalgamated into national Third and Fourth Divisions for the 1958–59 season.) | 46 | 21 | 12 | 13 | 90 | 58 | 54 | 7th | R3 | — | — | — | Sammy McCrory (Note: Scored 31 goals in the Third Division South.) | 33 ♦ |
| 1958–59 | Div 3 | 46 | 21 | 8 | 17 | 85 | 80 | 50 | 8th | R1 | — | — | — | Bud Houghton | 20 |
| 1959–60 | Div 3 | 46 | 19 | 8 | 19 | 76 | 74 | 46 | 12th | R2 | — | — | — | Dudley Price | 29 |
| 1960–61 | Div 3 | 46 | 14 | 11 | 21 | 60 | 76 | 39 | 20th | R2 | R2 | — | — | Peter Corthine; Jim Fryatt | 16 |
| 1961–62 | Div 3 | 46 | 13 | 16 | 17 | 57 | 69 | 42 | 16th | R1 | R1 | — | — | Ken Jones | 13 |
| 1962–63 | Div 3 | 46 | 19 | 12 | 15 | 75 | 77 | 50 | 8th | R2 | R2 | — | — | Ken Jones | 19 |
| 1963–64 | Div 3 | 46 | 15 | 15 | 16 | 77 | 78 | 45 | 14th | R1 | R3 | — | — | Mike Beesley | 13 |
| 1964–65 | Div 3 | 46 | 19 | 8 | 19 | 78 | 71 | 46 | 12th | R1 | R3 | — | — | Bobby Gilfillan | 23 |
| 1965–66 | Div 3 ↓ | 46 | 16 | 4 | 26 | 54 | 83 | 36 | 21st | R3 | R2 | — | — | Eddie Firmani | 20 |
| 1966–67 | Div 4 | 46 | 22 | 9 | 15 | 70 | 49 | 53 | 6th | R1 | R1 | — | — | Ray Smith | 19 |
| 1967–68 | Div 4 | 46 | 20 | 14 | 12 | 77 | 58 | 54 | 6th | R1 | R2 | — | — | Phil Chisnall; John McKinven | 17 |
| 1968–69 | Div 4 | 46 | 19 | 13 | 14 | 78 | 61 | 51 | 7th | R4 | R2 | — | — | Billy Best | 31 |
| 1969–70 | Div 4 | 46 | 15 | 10 | 21 | 59 | 85 | 40 | 17th | R1 | R3 | — | — | Billy Best | 24 |
| 1970–71 | Div 4 | 46 | 14 | 15 | 17 | 53 | 66 | 43 | 18th | R3 | R1 | — | — | Billy Best | 22 |
| 1971–72 | Div 4 ↑ | 46 | 24 | 12 | 10 | 81 | 55 | 60 | 2nd | R2 | R1 | — | — | Bill Garner | 26 |
| 1972–73 | Div 3 | 46 | 17 | 10 | 19 | 61 | 54 | 44 | 14th | R1 | R2 | — | — | Chris Guthrie | 15 |
| 1973–74 | Div 3 | 46 | 16 | 14 | 16 | 62 | 62 | 46 | 12th | R3 | R1 | — | — | Stuart Brace | 20 |
| 1974–75 | Div 3 | 46 | 13 | 16 | 17 | 46 | 51 | 42 | 18th | R3 | R2 | — | — | Chris Guthrie | 17 |
| 1975–76 | Div 3 ↓ | 46 | 12 | 13 | 21 | 65 | 75 | 37 | 23rd | R5 | R1 | — | — | Peter Silvester | 23 |
| 1976–77 | Div 4 | 46 | 15 | 19 | 12 | 52 | 45 | 49 | 10th | R3 | R1 | — | — | Stuart Parker | 16 |
| 1977–78 | Div 4 ↑ | 46 | 25 | 10 | 11 | 66 | 39 | 60 | 2nd | R3 | R1 | — | — | Derrick Parker | 23 |
| 1978–79 | Div 3 | 46 | 15 | 15 | 16 | 51 | 49 | 45 | 13th | R3 | R1 | — | — | Derrick Parker | 12 |
| 1979–80 | Div 3 ↓ | 46 | 14 | 10 | 22 | 47 | 58 | 38 | 22nd | R2 | R3 | — | — | Derrick Parker | 10 |
| 1980–81 | Div 4 ↑ | 46 | 30 | 7 | 9 | 79 | 31 | 67 | 1st | R1 | R1 | — | — | Derek Spence | 21 |
| 1981–82 | Div 3 | 46 | 18 | 15 | 13 | 63 | 51 | 69 (Note: The 1981–82 season saw the introduction of three points for a win instead of two.) | 7th | R1 | R1 | Football League Group Cup | Group | Keith Mercer | 13 |
| 1982–83 | Div 3 | 46 | 15 | 14 | 17 | 66 | 65 | 59 | 15th | R3 | R1 | Football League Group Cup | Group | Steve Phillips | 20 |
| 1983–84 | Div 3 ↓ | 46 | 10 | 14 | 22 | 55 | 76 | 44 | 22nd | R1 | R1 | Associate Members' Cup | QF(S) | Steve Phillips | 17 |
| 1984–85 | Div 4 | 46 | 13 | 11 | 22 | 58 | 83 | 50 | 20th | R1 | R1 | Associate Members' Cup | R1(S) | Steve Phillips | 23 |
| 1985–86 | Div 4 | 46 | 18 | 10 | 18 | 69 | 67 | 64 | 9th | R1 | R1 | Associate Members' Cup | Group | Richard Cadette | 25 ♦ |
| 1986–87 | Div 4 ↑ | 46 | 25 | 5 | 16 | 68 | 55 | 80 | 3rd | R2 | R2 | Associate Members' Cup | R1(S) | Richard Cadette | 30 |
| 1987–88 | Div 3 | 46 | 14 | 13 | 19 | 65 | 83 | 55 | 17th | R1 | R3 | Associate Members' Cup | R1(S) | David Crown | 17 |
| 1988–89 | Div 3 ↓ | 46 | 13 | 15 | 18 | 56 | 75 | 54 | 21st | R1 | R2 | Associate Members' Cup | R1(S) | David Crown (Note: Scored 26 goals in the Third Division.) | 29 ♦ |
| 1989–90 | Div 4 ↑ | 46 | 22 | 9 | 15 | 61 | 48 | 75 | 3rd | R1 | R2 | Associate Members' Cup | QF(S) | David Crown | 23 |
| 1990–91 | Div 3 ↑ | 46 | 26 | 7 | 13 | 67 | 51 | 85 | 2nd (Note: Promoted to the second tier for the first time.) | R1 | R2 | Associate Members' Cup | SF(S) | Brett Angell | 26 |
| 1991–92 | Div 2 | 46 | 17 | 11 | 18 | 63 | 63 | 62 | 12th | R3 | R1 | Full Members' Cup | R2(S) | Brett Angell | 23 |
| 1992–93 | Div 1 (Note: The newly formed FA Premier League split from the Football League, and the remaining divisions of the Football League were renumbered upwards.) | 46 | 13 | 13 | 20 | 54 | 64 | 52 | 18th | R5 | R1 | Anglo-Italian Cup | Prelim | Stan Collymore | 18 |
| 1993–94 | Div 1 | 46 | 17 | 8 | 21 | 63 | 67 | 59 | 15th | R3 | R2 | Anglo-Italian Cup | SF | Ricky Otto | 15 |
| 1994–95 | Div 1 | 46 | 18 | 8 | 20 | 54 | 73 | 62 | 13th | R3 | R1 | — | — | Gary Jones; Andy Thomson | 11 |
| 1995–96 | Div 1 | 46 | 15 | 14 | 17 | 52 | 61 | 59 | 14th | R3 | R2 | Anglo-Italian Cup | Group | Dave Regis | 9 |
| 1996–97 | Div 1 ↓ | 46 | 8 | 15 | 23 | 42 | 86 | 39 | 24th | R3 | R1 | — | — | Andy Rammell | 10 |
| 1997–98 | Div 2 ↓ | 46 | 11 | 10 | 25 | 47 | 79 | 43 | 24th | R2 | R2 | Football League Trophy | R1(S) | Jeroen Boere | 14 |
| 1998–99 | Div 3 | 46 | 14 | 12 | 20 | 52 | 58 | 54 | 18th | R1 | R2 | Football League Trophy | R2(S) | Rob Newman | 8 |
| 1999–2000 | Div 3 | 46 | 15 | 11 | 20 | 53 | 61 | 56 | 16th | R1 | R1 | Football League Trophy | R1(S) | Martin Carruthers | 19 |
| 2000–01 | Div 3 | 46 | 15 | 18 | 13 | 55 | 53 | 63 | 11th | R3 | R1 | Football League Trophy | F(S) | Ben Abbey; Martin Carruthers; David Lee | 10 |
| 2001–02 | Div 3 | 46 | 15 | 13 | 18 | 51 | 54 | 58 | 12th | R3 | R1 | Football League Trophy | R2(S) | Tes Bramble | 13 |
| 2002–03 | Div 3 | 46 | 17 | 3 | 26 | 47 | 59 | 54 | 17th | R2 | R1 | Football League Trophy | R1(S) | Mark Rawle | 12 |
| 2003–04 | Div 3 | 46 | 14 | 12 | 20 | 51 | 63 | 54 | 17th | R3 | R1 | Football League Trophy | F | Leon Constantine | 25 |
| 2004–05 | League 2 (Note: From the 2004–05 season, the Football League divisions were rebranded: Division One was renamed the Football League Championship, and Divisions Two and Three became Football League One and Football League Two respectively.) ↑ | 46 | 22 | 12 | 12 | 65 | 46 | 78 | 4th (Note: Promoted to League One via the play-offs, beating Northampton Town 1–0 on aggregate in the semi-final and Lincoln City 2–0 after extra time in the final.) | R1 | R1 | Football League Trophy | F | Freddy Eastwood | 24 |
| 2005–06 | League 1 ↑ | 46 | 23 | 13 | 10 | 72 | 43 | 82 | 1st | R2 | R1 | Football League Trophy | R1(S) | Freddy Eastwood | 25 |
| 2006–07 | Champ ↓ | 46 | 10 | 12 | 24 | 47 | 80 | 42 | 22nd | R4 | QF (Note: Southend's best performance in the League Cup. They eliminated Manchester United in the fourth round before losing narrowly to Tottenham Hotspur in the quarter-final.) | — | — | Freddy Eastwood | 16 |
| 2007–08 | League 1 | 46 | 22 | 10 | 14 | 70 | 55 | 76 | 6th (Note: Lost 5–1 on aggregate to Doncaster Rovers in the play-off semi-final.) | R4 | R3 | Football League Trophy | R1(S) | Nicky Bailey | 12 |
| 2008–09 | League 1 | 46 | 21 | 8 | 17 | 58 | 61 | 71 | 8th | R3 | R1 | Football League Trophy | R1(S) | Lee Barnard | 11 |
| 2009–10 | League 1 ↓ | 46 | 10 | 13 | 23 | 51 | 72 | 43 | 23rd | R1 | R2 | Football League Trophy | R2(S) | Lee Barnard | 17 |
| 2010–11 | League 2 | 46 | 16 | 13 | 17 | 62 | 56 | 61 | 13th | R1 | R2 | Football League Trophy | QF(S) | Barry Corr | 21 |
| 2011–12 | League 2 | 46 | 25 | 8 | 13 | 77 | 48 | 83 | 4th (Note: Lost 3–2 on aggregate to Crewe Alexandra in the play-off semi-final.) | R2 | R1 | Football League Trophy | SF(S) | Ryan Hall | 14 |
| 2012–13 | League 2 | 46 | 16 | 13 | 17 | 61 | 55 | 61 | 11th | R3 | R1 | Football League Trophy | F | Britt Assombalonga; Gavin Tomlin | 16 |
| 2013–14 | League 2 | 46 | 19 | 15 | 12 | 56 | 39 | 72 | 5th (Note: Lost 3–2 on aggregate to Burton Albion in the play-off semi-final.) | R4 | R1 | Football League Trophy | R2(S) | Barry Corr | 13 |
| 2014–15 | League 2 ↑ | 46 | 24 | 12 | 10 | 54 | 38 | 84 | 5th (Note: Promoted to League One via the play-offs, beating Stevenage 4–2 on aggregate in the semi-final and Wycombe Wanderers on penalties in the final.) | R1 | R1 | Football League Trophy | R1(S) | Barry Corr | 16 |
| 2015–16 | League 1 | 46 | 16 | 11 | 19 | 58 | 64 | 59 | 14th | R1 | R1 | Football League Trophy | QF(S) | Jack Payne | 9 |
| 2016–17 | League 1 | 46 | 20 | 12 | 14 | 70 | 53 | 72 | 7th | R1 | R1 | EFL Trophy | R2(S) | Simon Cox | 16 |
| 2017–18 | League 1 | 46 | 17 | 12 | 17 | 58 | 62 | 63 | 10th | R1 | R1 | EFL Trophy | R2(S) | Simon Cox | 10 |
| 2018–19 | League 1 | 46 | 14 | 8 | 24 | 55 | 68 | 50 | 19th | R2 | R1 | EFL Trophy | R3(S) | Simon Cox | 15 |
| 2019–20 | League 1 ↓ | 35 | 4 | 7 | 24 | 39 | 85 | 19 | 22nd (Note: The 2019–20 football season was disrupted by the effects of the COVID-19 pandemic. The EFL was suspended in March 2020 and in June, the League One clubs voted to end the regular season programme early. Teams had not all played the same number of matches, so it was agreed to construct final league tables on a points-per-game basis. Southend United's 23.89 points per game placed them 22nd.) | R1 | R2 | EFL Trophy | Group(S) | Charlie Kelman | 7 |
| 2020–21 | League 2 ↓ | 46 | 10 | 15 | 21 | 29 | 58 | 45 | 23rd (Note: Relegated from the League after 101 years continuous membership.) | R1 | R1 | EFL Trophy | Group(S) | Tom Clifford; Timothée Dieng; James Olayinka | 3 |
| 2021–22 | National | 44 | 16 | 10 | 18 | 45 | 61 | 58 | 13th | R1 | — | FA Trophy | R4 | Sam Dalby | 10 |
| 2022–23 | National | 46 | 20 | 9 | 17 | 57 | 45 | 69 | 8th | QR4 | — | FA Trophy | R5 | Jack Bridge | 13 |
| 2023–24 | National | 46 | 21 | 12 | 13 | 70 | 45 | 65 (Note: Ten points deducted for failure to clear tax debt.) | 9th | QR4 | — | FA Trophy | R3 | Harry Cardwell | 18 |
| 2024–25 | National | 46 | 17 | 17 | 12 | 59 | 48 | 68 | 7th (Note: Lost 3–2 to Oldham Athletic in the play-off final) | R1 | — | FA Trophy | R5 | Gus Scott-Morriss | 17 |
