= 1995–96 Southend United F.C. season =

Southend United
1995–96 season
- Chairman: Vic Jobson
- Manager: Ronnie Whelan (player-manager)
- Stadium: Roots Hall
- First Division: 14th
- FA Cup: Third round
- League Cup: Second round
- Top goalscorer: League: Dave Regis (8); All: Dave Regis (9)
- Average home league attendance: 5,599

During the 1995–96 English football season, Southend United F.C. competed in the Football League First Division.

== Season summary ==
On July 6, 1995, former Liverpool player Ronnie Whelan agreed to become player-manager, and Southend finished 14th in Division One in his first season as a manager.

== Final league table ==
Pos	Team	Pld	W	D	L	GF	GA	GD	Pts
12	Port Vale	46	15	15	16	59	66	−7	60
13	Tranmere Rovers	46	14	17	15	64	60	+4	59
14	Southend United	46	15	14	17	52	61	−9	59
15	Birmingham City	46	15	13	18	61	64	−3	58
16	Norwich City	46	14	15	17	59	55	+4	57

Rules for classification: 1) Points; 2) Goals scored; 3) Goal difference

== Results ==
Southend United's score comes first

=== Legend ===
Win	Draw	Loss

=== Football League First Division ===
Date	Opponent	Venue	Result	Attendance	Scorers
12 August 1995	Portsmouth	A	2–4	10,630	Thomson (2)
19 August 1995	Luton Town	H	0–1	4,630	
26 August 1995	Millwall	A	0–0	10,536	
29 August 1995	West Bromwich Albion	H	2–1	4,621	Thomson, Regis
1 September 1995	Reading	H	0–0	4,692	
9 September 1995	Sunderland	A	0–1	13,805	
13 September 1995	Derby County	A	0–1	9,242	
16 September 1995	Wolverhampton Wanderers	H	2–1	6,322	Gridelet, Jones
23 September 1995	Leicester City	A	3–1	15,276	Hails (3)
30 September 1995	Grimsby Town	H	1–0	4,977	Regis
7 October 1995	Birmingham City	A	0–2	17,341	
14 October 1995	Sheffield United	H	2–1	5,292	Regis, Tilson
21 October 1995	Tranmere Rovers	A	0–3	6,584	
28 October 1995	Huddersfield Town	H	0–0	5,128	
4 November 1995	Watford	A	2–2	7,091	Regis, Read
11 November 1995	Stoke City	H	2–4	5,967	Belsvik, Hails
18 November 1995	Crystal Palace	H	1–1	5,089	Regis
22 November 1995	Ipswich Town	A	1–1	9,757	Regis
25 November 1995	Oldham Athletic	A	1–0	6,474	Snodin (own goal)
2 December 1995	Birmingham City	H	3–1	7,770	Bodley, Regis, Byrne
9 December 1995	Leicester City	H	2–1	5,837	Dublin, Gridelet
16 December 1995	Grimsby Town	A	1–1	5,269	Byrne
20 December 1995	Port Vale	H	2–1	4,506	Marsh (2)
26 December 1995	Norwich City	A	1–0	17,029	Jones
1 January 1996	Barnsley	H	0–0	6,537	
13 January 1996	Luton Town	A	1–3	6,566	Byrne
20 January 1996	Portsmouth	H	2–1	5,560	McNally, Tilson
3 February 1996	Millwall	H	2–0	7,323	McNally, Regis
10 February 1996	West Bromwich Albion	A	1–3	12,096	Marsh
17 February 1996	Derby County	H	1–2	8,331	Thomson
24 February 1996	Wolverhampton Wanderers	A	0–2	24,677	
27 February 1996	Sunderland	H	0–2	5,810	
2 March 1996	Norwich City	H	1–1	6,208	Byrne
5 March 1996	Charlton Athletic	A	3–0	11,927	Dublin, Tilson, Thomson
9 March 1996	Port Vale	A	1–2	6,222	Boere
16 March 1996	Charlton Athletic	H	1–1	7,428	Thomson
19 March 1996	Reading	A	3–3	5,321	Willis (2), Rammell
23 March 1996	Barnsley	A	1–1	6,754	Rammell
30 March 1996	Tranmere Rovers	H	2–0	4,738	Byrne, Boere
2 April 1996	Sheffield United	A	0–3	11,319	
6 April 1996	Huddersfield Town	A	1–3	11,558	Willis
8 April 1996	Watford	H	1–1	5,348	Roget
13 April 1996	Crystal Palace	A	0–2	15,672	
20 April 1996	Ipswich Town	H	2–1	8,363	Dublin, Marsh
27 April 1996	Oldham Athletic	H	1–1	5,389	Marsh
5 May 1996	Stoke City	A	0–1	18,897	

=== FA Cup ===
Round	Date	Opponent	Venue	Result	Attendance	Goalscorers
R3	6 January 1996	West Ham United	A	0–2	23,284	

=== League Cup ===
Round	Date	Opponent	Venue	Result	Attendance	Goalscorers
R2 First Leg	19 September 1995	Crystal Palace	H	2–2	4,031	Byrne, Jones
R2 Second Leg	3 October 1995	Crystal Palace	A	0–2	6,588	

=== Anglo-Italian Cup ===
Round	Date	Opponent	Venue	Result	Attendance	Goalscorers
Group B	5 September 1995	Brescia	H	0–0	2,849	
Group B	11 October 1995	A.C. Reggiana	A	1–1	800	Tilson
Group B	8 November 1995	Salerno	A	1–2	1,200	Regis
Group B	13 December 1995	Foggia	H	1–2	2,570	Marsh

== Squad ==
Note: Flags indicate national team as defined under FIFA eligibility rules; some limited exceptions apply. Players may hold more than one non-FIFA nationality.

No.	Pos.	Nation	Player
—	GK	(England) ENG	Simon Royce
—	GK	(England) ENG	Paul Sansome
—	DF	(England) ENG	Anthony Barness (on loan from Chelsea)
—	DF	(England) ENG	Mick Bodley
—	DF	(England) ENG	Kenny Brown (on loan from West Ham United)
—	DF	(England) ENG	Keith Dublin
—	DF	(England) ENG	Phil Gridelet
—	DF	(England) ENG	Mark Hone
—	DF	(England) ENG	Chris Powell
—	DF	(England) ENG	Leo Roget
—	DF	(England) ENG	Mark Stimson
—	DF	(Scotland) SCO	Mark McNally
—	DF	(United States) USA	Mike Lapper
—	MF	(England) ENG	Andy Ansah
—	MF	(England) ENG	Julian Hails
—	MF	(England) ENG	Mike Marsh

No.	Pos.	Nation	Player
—	MF	(England) ENG	Andy Sussex
—	MF	(England) ENG	Steve Tilson
—	MF	(England) ENG	Roger Willis
—	MF	(Republic of Ireland) IRL	Paul Byrne
—	MF	(Republic of Ireland) IRL	Andy Turner (on loan from Tottenham Hotspur)
—	MF	(Republic of Ireland) IRL	Ronnie Whelan (player-manager)
—	FW	(England) ENG	Ken Charlery (on loan from Birmingham City)
—	FW	(England) ENG	Gary Jones
—	FW	(England) ENG	Andy Rammell
—	FW	(England) ENG	Paul Read (on loan from Arsenal)
—	FW	(England) ENG	Dave Regis
—	FW	(Scotland) SCO	Andy Thomson
—	FW	(Netherlands) NED	Jeroen Boere
—	FW	(Norway) NOR	Petter Belsvik (on loan from IK Start)
—	FW	(Nigeria) NGA	Dominic Iorfa
