= 1985 Luton riot =

1985 football riot in England

Luton riot
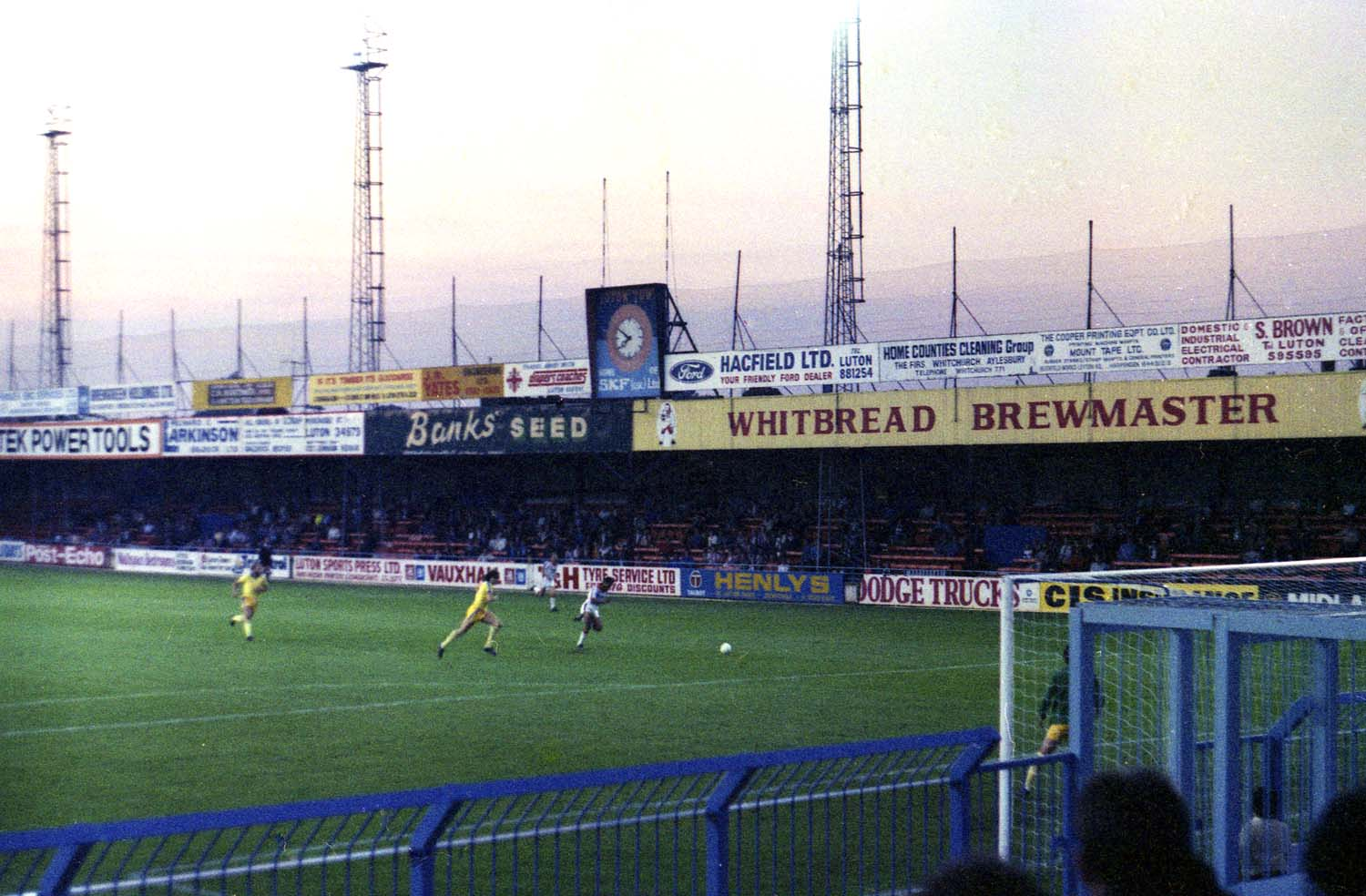
- The Bobbers Stand at Kenilworth Road (1980 photograph)
- Event: 1984–85 FA Cup sixth round
Luton Town	Millwall
1	0
- Date: 13 March 1985
- Venue: Kenilworth Road, Luton, Bedfordshire, England
- Referee: David Hutchinson
- Attendance: 17,470

The 1985 Luton riot occurred before, during and after a 1984–85 FA Cup sixth-round football match between Luton Town and Millwall on 13 March 1985 at Luton Town's Kenilworth Road ground in Luton, Bedfordshire, England. It was one of the worst incidents of football hooliganism during the 1980s, and led to a ban on away supporters by Luton Town which lasted for four seasons. This itself led to Luton's expulsion from the Football League Cup during the 1986–87 season. The club also began to enforce a membership card scheme, which Margaret Thatcher's government attempted to have adopted at grounds across England. Kenilworth Road was damaged, along with the surrounding area, and a year later was converted to an all-seater stadium.

== Background ==
Millwall's association with football hooliganism became strongly apparent with their rise in the English game during the 1980s. Millwall's Bushwackers were already one of the most notorious hooligan firms in the country by 1985, while Luton Town had their own fringe of hooligans in the MIGs. The Den, home of Millwall, had been the scene of a riot seven years earlier, when during another FA Cup sixth-round match against Ipswich Town, Millwall-aligned hooligans had injured dozens of their own club's supporters. Following the incident, the opinion of Ipswich manager Bobby Robson was that "[the police] should have turned the flamethrowers on them".

When George Graham had been appointed manager halfway through the 1982–83 season, Millwall had been bottom of the then third-tier Third Division and battling relegation to the Fourth Division; however, by the time of this FA Cup sixth-round match at First Division Luton Town's Kenilworth Road ground on 13 March 1985, they were challenging for promotion to the second tier. Luton had beaten their arch-rivals Watford in the previous round without incident, while Millwall had upset the odds with a 2–0 home victory over top-flight Leicester City. On the day of the match, Luton were second from bottom of the top division, while Millwall were third in the third tier.

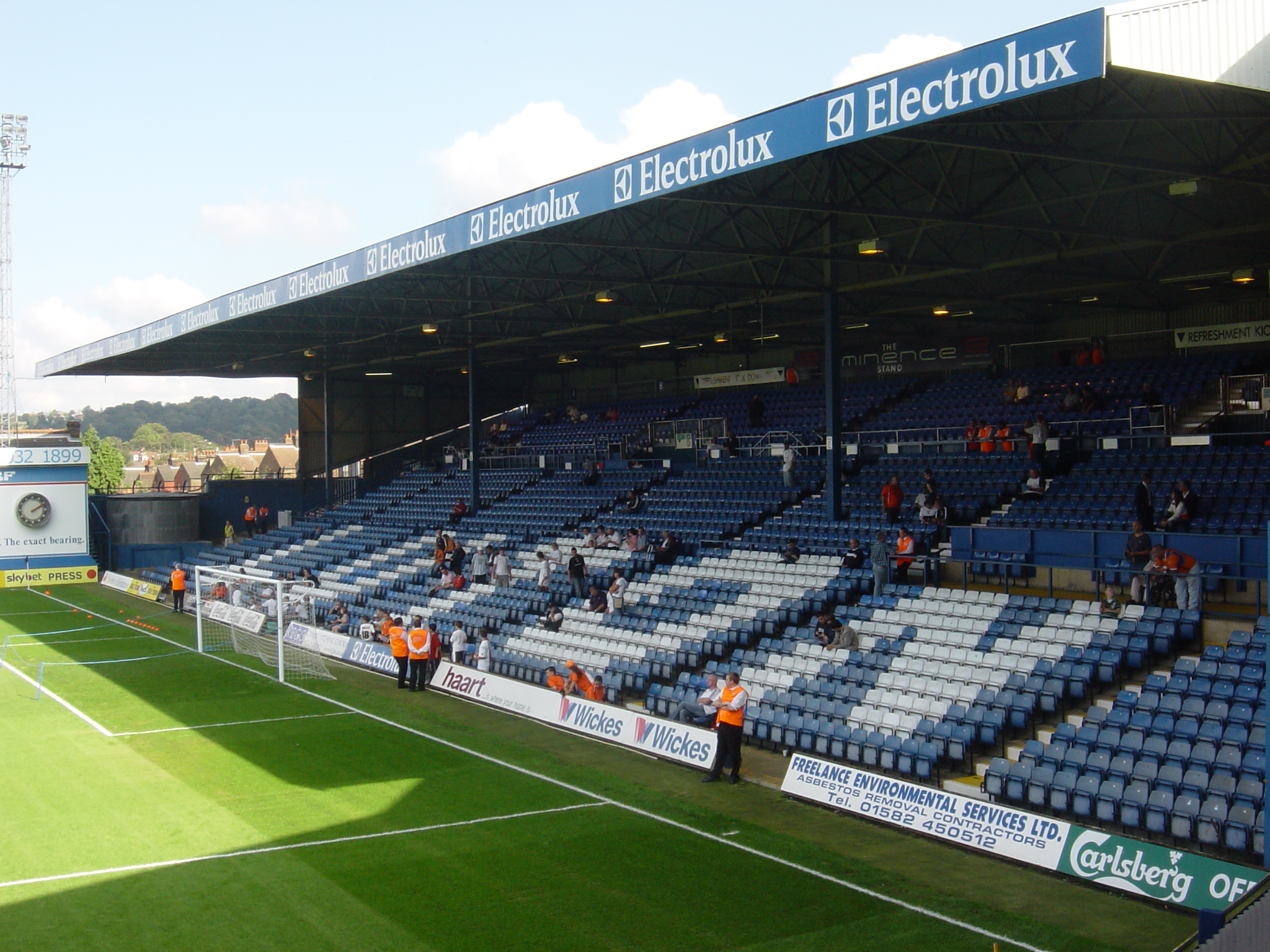
The Kenilworth Stand, pictured in 2006. An open terrace in 1985, it is estimated that 10,000 spectators gained entrance to the stand that night.

Although Luton were asked by Millwall to make the Wednesday night match all-ticket, the warning was not heeded. A disproportionately large away following, twice the size of Millwall's average home gate, arrived on the day of the game, and by 5.00 p.m. pubs and newsagents around the town were having windows smashed as the police struggled to cope. The Kenilworth Stand, at that time still a vast terrace, was reserved for the away supporters that night. It was overflowing by 7.00 p.m. – 45 minutes before kick-off – with spectators even perched on the scoreboard supports after the turnstiles had been broken down. Ten minutes later, officers of the Bedfordshire Police were helpless as hundreds of visitors scaled the fences in front of the stand to rush down the pitch towards Luton's supporters in the packed Oak Road End. A hail of bottles, cans, nails and coins saw the home supporters fleeing up the terraces, but their numbers, still growing as fans entered the stand, meant that there was little they could do to avoid the missiles.

The players came out to warm up, and almost immediately vanished back up the tunnel. The rioters then set upon the Bobbers Stand, ripping out seats and brandishing them as weapons. A message appeared on the stadium's electronic scoreboard, stating that the match would not start until they returned to their allocated area, but this was ignored; an appeal from Graham over the ground's loudspeaker also had no effect. It was only when Graham appeared on the sideline that the spectators finally returned to the Kenilworth Stand. Even after this some managed to find their way into the Main Stand, where isolated fights broke out and more seats were removed. The arrival of police dogs helped to clear the pitch; the match began on time, with many watching from atop the Bobbers Stand after climbing the floodlight pylons.

== Match details ==
13 March 1985
19:45 GMT

Luton Town	1–0	Millwall
B. Stein 31'

Kenilworth Road, Luton, Bedfordshire, England
Attendance: 17,470
Referee: David Hutchinson (Oxfordshire)

Luton Town

LUTON TOWN (4–4–2):
GK	1	(England) Les Sealey
RB	2	(England) Tim Breacker
LB	3	(England) Mitchell Thomas
CM	4	(England) Wayne Turner
CB	5	(England) Steve Foster (c)
CB	6	(Northern Ireland) Mal Donaghy
RM	7	(England) Ricky Hill
CF	8	(England) Brian Stein
CF	9	(England) Mick Harford
LM	10	(Nigeria) Emeka Nwajiobi
CM	11	(England) Garry Parker
Substitutes:
RM	12	(England) David Moss
Manager:
(England) David Pleat
MATCH OFFICIALS: Assistant referees: Unknown; Unknown

Millwall

MILLWALL (4–4–2):
GK	1	(England) Paul Sansome
CB	2	(England) Keith Stevens	Substituted off
LB	3	(England) Lindsay Smith
CB	4	(England) Dave Cusack
RB	5	(England) Paul Hinshelwood
LM	6	(Wales) Steve Lowndes
CM	7	(England) Les Briley (c)
CM	8	(England) Nicky Chatterton
CF	9	(Wales) Steve Lovell
CF	10	(England) John Fashanu
RM	11	(England) Anton Otulakowski
Substitutes:
CB	12	(Scotland) Kevin Bremner	Substituted on
Manager:
(Scotland) George Graham
MATCH RULES: 90 minutes.; Replay if scores still level.; One named substitute.; Maximum of one substitution.

== Match events ==
Luton started the match, kicking towards the Millwall supporters. After only fourteen minutes, the match was halted as the visiting fans began to riot again. The referee took both teams off for twenty-five minutes, before bringing them back on to complete the match. Brian Stein put Luton ahead on thirty-one minutes, and the home side led by this score at half-time; when Luton continued to lead the match as it entered its final stages, the fear became that the pitch might be invaded once more in order to have the match abandoned and therefore prevent a Millwall defeat. Fans attempted to disrupt the match, but extra police managed to keep control. Some seats were removed, and one of these was thrown and hit a match steward in the head. Luton goalkeeper Les Sealey, who had to stand in front of the Millwall fans during the second half, received a missile to the head, and a knife was also found in the goalmouth after the game.

Following the final whistle, and a 1–0 victory for Luton, the visiting fans invaded the pitch. Both Luton and Millwall players sprinted for the dressing room as fast as they could – one hooligan rushed towards Luton coach Trevor Hartley, and tried to grab him, but Hartley managed to wriggle free and race towards the tunnel after the players. The hooligans made for the Bobbers Stand once more, and started to tear seats out as the fences at the front of the stand were forced down. The seats ripped from the stand were hurled onto the pitch towards the police, who started to fall back, before regrouping and charging in waves, batons drawn. Gradually the police started to win the battle, at which point the hooligans started to take seats from the Main Stand and throw them like "makeshift plastic spears". The police were not without casualties – of the 81 people injured, almost half of them were policemen. Sergeant Colin Cook was caught in the centre circle and struck on the head with a concrete block. He stopped breathing, but PC Phil Evans resuscitated him while being punched, kicked and hit himself by the concrete.

As a life-long Millwall supporter I could stand in disbelief as I watched the riots and I felt like crying. Children around me clung to their parents in fear; women and pensioners vowed never to go to a football match again… The scenes before me were ones of open bloody warfare… I was reminded of the Brixton riots. As a true Millwall fan it was impossible not to feel shame, not to feel sorrow for the game of football. And not to despair at how low life had sunk; for these were not fans, they were not people, they were animals.

— Jim Murray reports to his London newspaper

The carnage continued through the town, as a battle between the mob and the police developed, leaving smashed cars, shops and homes in its wake. When the situation was brought back under control, thirty-one men were arrested and taken to Luton Magistrates' Court the following morning. The majority of the thirty-one identified themselves as supporters of teams other than Millwall, most notably Chelsea and West Ham United.

== Aftermath ==
Wreckage in front of the Bobbers Stand, the following morning

Despite having reached an FA Cup semi-final, Luton manager David Pleat was left "feeling empty". Luton were defeated by Everton 2–1 at Villa Park after extra-time following a 1–1 stalemate. However, their league form improved so much that they finished 13th in the First Division. Eventually finishing second in the third tier, Millwall won promotion to the Second Division only six weeks later.

The Football Association (or The FA) commissioned an inquiry, which concluded that it was "not satisfied that Millwall F.C. took all reasonable precautions in accordance with the requirements of FA Rule 31(A)(II)." A £7,500 fine was levied against Millwall, though this was withdrawn on appeal. The penalty that Millwall faced was perhaps that the club's name was now "synonymous with everything that was bad in football and society". Luton Town were ordered to construct fences around their ground, a decision that was also reversed. Chelsea chairman Ken Bates claimed that he intended to erect electric fences at Stamford Bridge to avert such an incident at his club.

Luton Town announced a £1 million overhaul of Kenilworth Road soon after – the club would spend £350,000 on a new artificial pitch that summer, and £650,000 on converting the ground to an all-seater. Work on the stands began during the summer of 1986, but was not finished until 2005.

There have been many incidents of football hooliganism among Millwall fans since this incident. On 9 January 1988, forty-one Millwall fans were arrested at Highbury after a disturbance at an FA Cup third-round game which was quickly labelled by the public and media as "The Battle of Highbury". Millwall relocated to The New Den in 1993, and the end of their first season there was marred by a First Division play-off semi-final defeat and a series of pitch invasions by Millwall fans, as well as alleged racial chanting at opposition Derby County's two black players which led to them both being substituted. In May 2002, fifty police officers were injured when Millwall hooligans clashed with police in a Division One play-off semi-defeat by Birmingham City.

=== Membership scheme and ban on visiting supporters ===
The Luton Town chairman, David Evans, reacted by imposing a ban on all away supporters from Kenilworth Road from the start of the 1986–87 season. A club membership scheme was also introduced: Luton Town supporters' personal details were taken by the club and all fans would be required to carry their membership cards to be admitted to matches. The football hooliganism "War Cabinet", set up following the incident by Margaret Thatcher's Conservative government, attempted to have such schemes adopted by clubs nationwide without success.

The first match of the identity card scheme was the First Division match against Southampton on 26 August 1986. The Football League insisted that Luton relax the ban for League Cup matches, but when Evans refused to allow Cardiff City fans to visit Kenilworth Road for their second-round tie, the club was banned from the competition for that season. The FA announced that Luton would be allowed to maintain their ban on visiting supporters in the FA Cup, but also that they would allow other clubs to ban away support from Luton. In response, Luton eased the ban slightly – 500 tickets would be given to certain clubs, with this number doubling should the match pass without incident. The suspension of away support continued for four seasons, and, from a policing standpoint, was a success – during its enforcement, not one arrest was made either inside or outside the ground. Despite this, and the support of Bedfordshire Police for the scheme, Luton Town repealed the ban before the start of the 1990–91 season.
