= Leo Roget =

English footballer

Personal information
- Full name: Leo Thomas Earl Roget
- Date of birth: 1 August 1977 (age 49)
- Place of birth: Ilford, England
- Height: 6 ft 1 in (1.85 m)
- Position: Defender

Youth career
- 1990–1995: Southend United

Senior career*
| Years | Team | Apps | (Gls) |
| 1995–2001 | Southend United | 122 | (0) |
| 2001 | → Stockport County (loan) | 8 | (0) |
| 2001–2002 | Stockport County | 23 | (1) |
| 2002 | → Reading (loan) | 1 | (0) |
| 2002–2004 | Brentford | 29 | (0) |
| 2004 | Rushden & Diamonds | 17 | (0) |
| 2004–2006 | Oxford United | 68 | (4) |
| 2007 | St Albans City | 3 | (0) |
| 2008 | Harlow Town | 3 | (0) |
| 2008 | Braintree Town | 2 | (0) |
| 2008–2009 | Rushden & Diamonds | 1 | (0) |
| 2010–2011 | Harlow Town | 21 | (0) |
- * Club domestic league appearances and goals

Leo Thomas Earl Roget (born 1 August 1977) is an English retired professional footballer made over 120 appearances as a defender in the Football League for Southend United. He also played league football for Oxford United, Stockport County, Brentford, Rushden & Diamonds, Reading and was noted for his "pace, mobility and strength in the air". A "bad boy" player, Roget received 60 yellow cards and was sent off seven times during his professional career. He fought one professional bout as a boxer in December 2013.

== Career ==
=== Southend United ===
==== 1990–1999 ====
A defender, Roget joined Southend United as a schoolboy in 1990, at the age of 13. He signed his first professional contract on 5 July 1995 and make eight appearances and scored one goal during the 1995–96 First Division season. Roget broke into the team on a regular basis during the 1996–97 season and his form was such that he accepted the invitation of a trial with Dutch club Feyenoord. Despite the Shrimpers' relegation to the Second Division in May 1997, he signed a new three-year contract to remain at Roots Hall.

Early in the 1997–98 season, Roget damaged discs in his spine and did not return to fitness until April 1998, by which time Southend were in the thick of another relegation scrap. After failing to stave off relegation to the Third Division, Roget began the 1998–99 season as a regular, but a hamstring strain suffered one month into the campaign kept him out of action until December 1998. He appeared as a bit-part player through to the end of the season and admitted that "at times my mental attitude towards the game hasn't been right".

==== 1999–2001 ====
Entering the final year of his contract, Roget was a regular during the first half of the 1999–00 season alongside Simon Coleman in central defence. He lost his place in the team in December 1999, when after a 3–1 home defeat to Barnet, he "stormed into the visitors' changing room and broke their stereo with an angry kick", which he later denied. Roget regained his place in the team in January 2000 and finished a mid-table 1999–00 season with 40 appearances and two goals.

Roget rejected the offer of a new one-year contract during the 2000 off-season and as he was too young to be given a free transfer under the Bosman ruling, he would remain at Roots Hall on a week-to-week contract during the 2000–01 season. He was again a regular in central defence alongside Phil Whelan, though new manager David Webb questioned in October 2000 "if he (Roget) is only playing so well because he hasn't got a contract at the moment". Having already accumulated seven yellow cards during the season, Webb was forced into showdown talks with "bad boy" Roget in January 2001. A 3–0 defeat to Halifax Town on 17 February 2001 would be Roget's final Southend United appearance, as he was dropped by David Webb shortly after. He departed the club on loan on 1 March 2001 and on a permanently one month later. Roget made 139 appearances and scored 10 goals during nearly six seasons as a professional at Roots Hall.

=== Stockport County ===
On 1 March 2001, Roget joined First Division club Stockport County on a one-month loan, with a view to a permanent deal. He had been a target for the Hatters prior to the start of the 2000–01 season, but the club baulked at Southend United's valuation. He instantly went into the starting lineup and after the loan expired, the move was made permanent for an initial £50,000 fee. Roget finished the 2000–01 season with eight appearances.

Roget was a regular in defence during the 2001–02 season and scored his first goal for the club with a late penalty in a 2–1 defeat to Sheffield United on 18 September 2001. Roget fell out of favour under manager Carlton Palmer in February 2002 was replaced in the team by new signing Dave Challinor. After turning down a £70,000 move to Chinese club Red Heart K, he joined Second Division club Reading on loan until the end of the 2001–02 season. He made his only appearance for the club with a start in a 0–0 draw with Swindon Town, in which three players were sent off. Roget was an unused substitute during the remainder of the season's matches and was part of the squad which sealed automatic promotion to the First Division on the final day of the season.

At the end of the 2001–02 season, Roget's Stockport County contract was cancelled by mutual consent and he departed the club, having made 32 appearances and scored one goal during just over a year at Edgley Park.

=== Brentford ===
After a trial period with Oxford United, Roget joined Second Division club Brentford on a non-contract basis on 9 August 2002. He was a regular starter alongside Ibrahima Sonko in central defence and on 3 September he signed a new contract to remain at Griffin Park until 30 December 2002. Despite missing five months of the 2002–03 season due to ankle ligament damage and a hamstring problem, Roget was a starter when fit and after signing a contract extension in January 2003, he remained with Brentford until the end of the season.

Roget signed a new one-year contract in May 2003 and began the 2003–04 season as a regular starter. In September 2003, he was transfer-listed for reacting "to abuse from a section of the Griffin Park crowd" with "an obscene gesture to fans" after being sent off during a 3–1 defeat to Plymouth Argyle. In the following match versus Rushden & Diamonds, one week later, Roget gave a performance which reaffirmed his commitment to the club and he was reinstated to the starting lineup by manager Wally Downes. Roget continued to keep his place until his contract was cancelled in late January 2004. During 18 months with Brentford, he made 33 appearances.

=== Rushden & Diamonds ===
On 31 January 2004, Roget joined Second Division strugglers Rushden & Diamonds on a contract running until the end of the 2003–04 season. He started in all but one of his 17 appearances, but could not prevent the Diamonds' relegation to the Third Division at the end of the season. Roget was released in May 2004.

=== Oxford United ===
Roget joined League Two club Oxford United on a two-year contract on 7 July 2004. Roget made 36 appearances and scored two goals during the 2004–05 season, but was given a free transfer by manager Brian Talbot in May 2005 and he trialled with Grimsby Town during the 2005–06 pre-season. Roget remained at the Kassam Stadium for the final year of his contract and made 41 appearances and scored three goals during a dire 2005–06 season, at the end of which the Us were relegated to the Conference Premier. During his two seasons with Oxford United, Roget made 77 appearances and scored five goals. He retired from professional football in 2006 and later stated that he "didn't love the game anymore".

=== Non-League football ===
Between 2007 and 2011, Roget wound down his career in non-League football, with short spells at St Albans City, Braintree Town and a short-lived return to Rushden & Diamonds. A return to the Football League looked a possibility when he joined League Two club Gillingham on trial during the 2008–09 pre-season, but he failed to win a contract. After an initial brief spell with Isthmian League club Harlow Town in February 2008, Roget returned to the club for the duration of the 2010–11 season and 29 appearances and scoring one goal, before departing for personal reasons in July 2011.

== International career ==
In advance of the 2006 World Cup, officials from Trinidad and Tobago travelled to England to watch Roget in early 2006, but he was not named in the provisional squad for the finals.

== Coaching career ==
In June 2025, Roget joined the coaching team of Isthmian League South East Division side Sittingbourne.

== Boxing ==
In 2012, Roget took up boxing and after winning his first three amateur fights, his first professional fight, at cruiserweight, was to have been against Mitch Mitchell at York Hall on 16 November 2013. Due to neck and back injuries suffered by Roget in training, the fight was postponed until 7 December 2013. Roget lost 39–38 on points and announced his retirement in September 2014.

== Personal life ==
Roget is of Trinidad and Tobagonian descent on his father's side. After retiring from football in 2006, he "lived in Spain for a year and got fat and out of condition and was an absolute disgrace. After that I got into personal training". He subsequently set himself up as a personal trainer and as of 2013 and 2014 was working in the Harlow and Braintree branches of Ripped Gym respectively. As of April 2022, he was working as a personal trainer.

== Career statistics ==
Appearances and goals by club, season and competition
| Club | Season | League | | | FA Cup | | League Cup | | Other | | Total | |
| Club | Season | Division | Apps | Goals | Apps | Goals | Apps | Goals | Apps | Goals | Apps | Goals |
|---|---|---|---|---|---|---|---|---|---|---|---|---|
| Southend United | 1995–96 | First Division | 8 | 1 | 0 | 0 | 0 | 0 | — | | 8 | 1 |
| Southend United | 1996–97 | First Division | 26 | 0 | 1 | 0 | 0 | 0 | — | | 27 | 0 |
| Southend United | 1997–98 | Second Division | 11 | 0 | 0 | 0 | 3 | 0 | 0 | 0 | 14 | 0 |
| Southend United | 1998–99 | Third Division | 14 | 0 | 0 | 0 | 1 | 0 | 0 | 0 | 15 | 0 |
| Southend United | 1999–00 | Third Division | 36 | 2 | 1 | 0 | 2 | 0 | 1 (Note: Appearances in Football League Trophy) | 0 | 40 | 2 |
| Southend United | 2000–01 | Third Division | 27 | 5 | 4 | 1 | 2 | 0 | 2 | 1 | 35 | 7 |
| Southend United | Total | | 122 | 8 | 6 | 1 | 8 | 0 | 3 | 1 | 139 | 10 |
| Stockport County (loan) | 2000–01 | First Division | 8 | 0 | — | | — | | — | | 8 | 0 |
| Stockport County | 2001–02 | First Division | 23 | 1 | 0 | 0 | 1 | 0 | — | | 24 | 1 |
| Stockport County | Total | | 31 | 1 | 0 | 0 | 1 | 0 | — | | 32 | 1 |
| Reading (loan) | 2001–02 | Second Division | 1 | 0 | — | | — | | — | | 1 | 0 |
| Brentford | 2002–03 | Second Division | 14 | 0 | 1 | 0 | 1 | 0 | 1 | 0 | 17 | 0 |
| Brentford | 2003–04 | Second Division | 15 | 0 | 0 | 0 | 0 | 0 | 1 | 0 | 16 | 0 |
| Brentford | Total | | 29 | 0 | 1 | 0 | 1 | 0 | 2 | 0 | 33 | 0 |
| Rushden & Diamonds | 2003–04 | Second Division | 17 | 0 | — | | — | | — | | 17 | 0 |
| Oxford United | 2004–05 | League Two | 35 | 2 | 0 | 0 | 1 | 0 | 0 | 0 | 36 | 2 |
| Oxford United | 2005–06 | League Two | 33 | 2 | 4 | 0 | 1 | 0 | 3 | 1 | 41 | 3 |
| Oxford United | Total | | 68 | 4 | 4 | 0 | 2 | 0 | 3 | 1 | 77 | 5 |
| St Albans City | 2007–08 | Conference South | 3 | 0 | — | | — | | — | | 3 | 0 |
| Harlow Town | 2007–08 | Isthmian League Premier Division | 3 | 0 | — | | — | | — | | 3 | 0 |
| Braintree Town | 2008–09 | Conference South | 2 | 0 | — | | — | | 0 | 0 | 2 | 0 |
| Rushden & Diamonds | 2008–09 | Conference Premier | 1 | 0 | — | | — | | 1 (Note: Appearance in Hillier Cup) | 0 | 2 | 0 |
| Rushden & Diamonds | Total | | 18 | 0 | — | | — | | 1 | 0 | 19 | 0 |
| Harlow Town | 2010–11 | Isthmian League First Division North | 21 | 0 | 4 | 0 | — | | 4 (Note: 3 appearances and 1 goal in FA Trophy, 1 appearance in Isthmian League play-offs) | 1 | 29 | 1 |
| Harlow Town | Total | | 24 | 0 | 4 | 0 | — | | 4 | 1 | 32 | 0 |
| Career total | | | 298 | 13 | 15 | 1 | 12 | 0 | 13 | 3 | 338 | 17 |
