= Peter Dursun =

Danish footballer (born 1975)

Personal information
- Full name: Peter Dursun
- Date of birth: 8 January 1975 (age 51)
- Place of birth: Aarhus, Denmark
- Height: 5 ft 11 in (1.80 m)

Senior career*
Years	Team	Apps	(Gls)
1996–1997	Southend United	1	(0)
1997–1998	Aarhus Fremad	9	(1)
1998–????	Hvidovre IF		
- * Club domestic league appearances and goals as of 15:16, 7 April 2009 (UTC)

Peter Dursun (born 8 January 1975) is a Danish former footballer, who played for Southend United in the Football League in 1996.

Dursun made his debut in the Division One for Southend United on 14 December 1996, away to Queens Park Rangers in the 4–0 defeat, replacing Julian Hails in the 53rd minute.

He then played for Aarhus Fremad, and Hvidovre IF.
