= Billy Goodwin =

English footballer

Personal information
- Full name: William Goodwin
- Date of birth: January 1892
- Place of birth: Staveley, England
- Date of death: 9 July 1951 (aged 59)
- Height: 5 ft 9 in (1.75 m)
- Position: Forward

Youth career
- Old Staveley Primitives
- Chesterfield

Senior career*
Years	Team	Apps	(Gls)
1913–1914	Blackburn Rovers	0	(0)
1914–1920	Exeter City		
1920–1922	Manchester United	7	(1)
1922–1927	Southend United	84	(32)
1927–?	Dartford		
- Oldham Athletic
- Congleton Town
- Mossley
- Droylsden
- Mossley
- * Club domestic league appearances and goals

William Goodwin (January 1892 – 9 July 1951) was an English footballer. His regular position was as a forward. He was born in Staveley, Derbyshire. He played in the Football League for Manchester United, and Southend United.

Goodwin played for Exeter City before joining Manchester United for a fee of £640 in June 1920. He played seven games for United's first team. His debut was a defeat at home to Bolton Wanderers in August 1920. He left United in August 1922, joining Southend United, where he was top scorer the following season with 22 goals. He remained with Southend until August 1927 when he joined Dartford.

He later joined Oldham Athletic and Congleton Town from where he joined Mossley. He later rejoined Mossley from Droylsden.
