= Tudor Martin =

Welsh footballer

Personal information
- Full name: Tudor James Martin
- Date of birth: 20 April 1904
- Place of birth: Caerau, Bridgend, Wales
- Date of death: September 6, 1979 (aged 75)
- Place of death: Newport
- Height: 5 ft 10 in (1.78 m)
- Position: Forward

Senior career*
| Years | Team | Apps | (Gls) |
- Caerau
- Bridgend Town
| 1926–1929 | West Bromwich Albion | 0 | (0) |
| 1929–1930 | Newport County | 27 | (34) |
| 1930–1932 | Wolverhampton Wanderers | 15 | (9) |
| 1932–1936 | Swansea Town | 116 | (45) |
| 1936–1937 | West Ham United | 11 | (7) |
| 1937–1939 | Southend United | 59 | (29) |

International career
| 1930 | Wales | 1 | (0) |
- * Club domestic league appearances and goals

Tudor James Martin (20 April 1904 — 6 September 1979) was a Welsh professional footballer. He began his career with local amateur sides before being signed by West Bromwich Albion in 1926. He was released by Albion without making an appearance and joined Newport County where he enjoyed a prolific season before moving to Wolverhampton Wanderers in 1930. He later played for Swansea Town, West Ham United and Southend United.

== Early life ==
Martin was born in Caerau, Bridgend. After leaving school, he initially worked as a coal miner.

== Career ==
Martin began his career with his hometown side Caerau and later played for another local amateur team, Bridgend Town. His performances at non-league level prompted Football League side West Bromwich Albion to offer him a professional contract in October 1926. He remained with West Brom for three years but never made a first team appearance for the club. At the end of the 1928–29 season, Martin was forced to undergo surgery after suffering a cartilage injury and was released by West Brom as the club believed he would never fully recover. In July 1929, Martin was offered a contract by Newport County manager Jimmy Hindmarsh and spent two months playing for the club's reserve side before being handed his professional debut. He embarked on a prolific scoring run, netting a hat-trick against Queens Park Rangers in his third appearance before scoring five in Newport's 10–0 victory over Merthyr Town shortly after. His form, scoring 34 goals in 27 league appearances, quickly attracted attention from other clubs and he signed for Wolverhampton Wanderers in May 1930 in exchange for £1,500 and Cyril Pearce. He also won his only international cap for Wales in 1930 against Northern Ireland.

Martin spent two seasons with Wolverhampton, scoring 9 goals in 15 league games, but struggled to establish himself in the first team and was allowed to join Swansea Town in July 1932. He made over 100 appearances for Swansea before joining West Ham United in July 1936. He was sent off in a match for West Ham for retaliating, becoming the first player to be dismissed for the club in 25 years and was allowed to leave the club without making any further appearances. He finished his career with Southend United.

== See also ==
- List of Wales international footballers (alphabetical)
