= 2013–14 Southend United F.C. season =

Southend United
2013–14 season
- Owner: Ron Martin
- Chairman: Ron Martin
- Manager: Phil Brown
- Stadium: Roots Hall
- League Two: 5th
- Play-offs: Semi-finals
- FA Cup: Fourth round
- League Cup: First round
- FL Trophy: Second round
- Top goalscorer: League: Barry Corr (12); All: Barry Corr; Kevan Hurst (12 each)
- Highest home attendance: 10,250 (vs Hull City, 25 January 2014, FA Cup)
- Lowest home attendance: 2,971 (vs Yeovil Town, 6 August 2013, League Cup)
- Average home league attendance: 5,980
Home colours	Away colours

The 2013–14 season was Southend United Football Club's 107th year in existence and 4th consecutive season in the Football League Two, the fourth tier on English football.

== Review and events ==
On 19 June 2013, their fixture list was released and it was confirmed that they would play Plymouth Argyle F.C. on the opening weekend.

== Competitions ==
=== Overall record ===
Competition	First match	Last match	Starting round	Final position	Record							
Competition	First match	Last match	Starting round	Final position	Pld	W	D	L	GF	GA	GD	Win %
League Two	3 August 2013	3 May 2014	Matchday 1	5th	36	19	5	12	56	39	+17	52.78
Play-offs	11 May 2014	17 May 2014	Semi-finals	Semi-finals	2	0	1	1	2	3	−1	0.00
FA Cup	9 November 2013	25 January 2014	First round	Fourth round	4	3	0	1	10	4	+6	75.00
League Cup	6 August 2013	6 August 2013	First round	First round	1	0	0	1	0	1	−1	0.00
Football League Trophy	8 October 2013	8 October 2013	First round	First round	1	0	0	1	2	5	−3	0.00
Total					44	22	6	16	70	52	+18	50.00

Source: Worldfootball

=== League Two ===
==== League table ====
Pos	Team	Pld	W	D	L	GF	GA	GD	Pts	Promotion, qualification or relegation
3	Rochdale (P)	46	24	9	13	69	48	+21	81	Promotion to Football League One
4	Fleetwood Town (O, P)	46	22	10	14	66	52	+14	76	Qualification for League Two play-offs
5	Southend United	46	19	15	12	56	39	+17	72	Qualification for League Two play-offs
6	Burton Albion	46	19	15	12	47	42	+5	72	Qualification for League Two play-offs
7	York City	46	18	17	11	52	41	+11	71	Qualification for League Two play-offs

Updated to match(es) played on 3 May 2014. Source: BBC Sport
Rules for classification: 1) Points; 2) Goal difference; 3) Number of goals scored
(O) Play-off winners; (P) Promoted

==== Results summary ====
Overall								Home						Away					
Pld	W	D	L	GF	GA	GD	Pts	W	D	L	GF	GA	GD	W	D	L	GF	GA	GD
46	19	15	12	56	39	+17	72	11	7	5	29	16	+13	8	8	7	27	23	+4

Source: Sky Sports

==== Score overview ====
Win Draw Loss

Opposition	Home score	Away score	Aggregate score	Double
Accrington Stanley	1–0	1–1	2–1	No
Bristol Rovers	1–1	0–0	1–1	No
Burton Albion	1–0	1–0	2–0	Yes
Bury	0–0	1–1	1–1	No
Cheltenham Town	1–1	2–1	3–2	No
Chesterfield	3–0	1–2	4–2	No
Dagenham & Redbridge	0–1	1–1	1–2	No
Exeter City	2–3	2–0	4–3	No
Fleetwood Town	2–0	1–1	3–1	No
Hartlepool United	1–1	1–0	2–1	No
Mansfield Town	3–0	1–2	4–2	No
Morecambe	1–3	1–2	2–5	No
Newport County	0–0	1–3	1–3	No
Northampton Town	2–0	1–2	3–2	No
Oxford United	3–0	2–0	5–0	Yes
Plymouth Argyle	1–0	1–1	2–1	No
Portsmouth	2–1	2–1	4–2	Yes
Rochdale	1–1	3–0	4–1	No
Scunthorpe United	0–1	2–2	1–2	No
Torquay United	1–0	1–0	1–1	No
Wycombe Wanderers	1–1	1–2	2–3	No
York City	2–1	0–0	2–1	No

== Competitions ==
=== League Two ===
==== League table ====
Pos	Team	Pld	W	D	L	GF	GA	GD	Pts	Promotion, qualification or relegation
3	Rochdale (P)	46	24	9	13	69	48	+21	81	Promotion to Football League One
4	Fleetwood Town (O, P)	46	22	10	14	66	52	+14	76	Qualification for League Two play-offs
5	Southend United	46	19	15	12	56	39	+17	72	Qualification for League Two play-offs
6	Burton Albion	46	19	15	12	47	42	+5	72	Qualification for League Two play-offs
7	York City	46	18	17	11	52	41	+11	71	Qualification for League Two play-offs

Updated to match(es) played on 3 May 2014. Source: BBC Sport
Rules for classification: 1) Points; 2) Goal difference; 3) Number of goals scored
(O) Play-off winners; (P) Promoted

==== Matches ====
League Two match details
Date	Opponents	Venue	Result	Score F–A	Scorers	Attendance	Ref.
3 August 2013	Plymouth Argyle	H	W	1–0	Corr	7,055	
10 August 2013	Hartlepool United	A	W	1–0	Eastwood	3,479	
17 August 2013	Northampton Town	H	W	2–0	Straker, Eastwood	5,510	
24 August 2013	Chesterfield	A	L	1–2			
31 August 2013	Wycombe Wanderers	A	L	1–2			
7 September 2013	Morecambe	H	L	1–3			
13 September 2013	Scunthorpe United	H	L	0–1			
21 September 2013	Bury	A	D	1–1			
27 September 2013	Bristol Rovers	H	D	1–1			
5 October 2013	Oxford United	A	W	2–0			
12 October 2013	Burton Albion	A	W	1–0			
18 October 2013	Fleetwood Town	H	W	2–0			
22 October 2013	Dagenham & Redbridge	H	L	0–1			
26 October 2013	Newport County	A	L	1–3			
1 November 2013	Mansfield Town	H	W	3–0			
16 November 2013	Exeter City	A	W	2–0			
23 November 2013	York City	H	W	2–1			
26 November 2013	Portsmouth	A	W	2–1			
30 November 2013	Cheltenham Town	H	D	1–1			
14 December 2013	Torquay United	A	L	0–1			
20 December 2013	Rochdale	H	D	1–1			
26 December 2013	AFC Wimbledon	A	W	1–0			
29 December 2013	Accrington Stanley	A	D	1–1			
1 January 2014	Portsmouth	H	W	2–1			
11 January 2014	Plymouth Argyle	A	D	1–1			
18 January 2014	Chesterfield	H	W	3–0			
28 January 2014	Dagenham & Redbridge	A	D	1–1			
31 January 2014	Newport County	H	D	0–0			
8 February 2014	Mansfield Town	A	L	1–2			
15 February 2014	Exeter City	H	L	2–3			
18 February 2014	Hartlepool United	H	D	1–1			
22 February 2014	York City	A	D	0–0			
25 February 2014	Northampton Town	A	L	1–2			
1 March 2014	Wycombe Wanderers	H	D	1–1			
8 March 2014	Morecambe	A	L	1–2			
11 March 2014	Scunthorpe United	A	D	2–2			
15 March 2014	Bury	H	D	0–0			
21 March 2014	Bristol Rovers	A	D	0–0			
24 March 2014	Oxford United	H	W	3–0			
29 March 2014	Torquay United	H	W	1–0			
5 April 2014	Cheltenham Town	A	W	2–1			
12 April 2014	AFC Wimbledon	H	L	0–1			
18 April 2014	Rochdale	A	W	3–0			
21 April 2014	Accrington Stanley	H	W	1–0			
26 April 2014	Fleetwood Town	A	D	1–1			
3 May 2014	Burton Albion	H	W	1–0			

=== FA Cup ===
FA Cup match details
Round	Date	Opponents	Venue	Result	Score F–A	Scorers	Attendance	Ref.
First round	9 November 2013	Morecambe	A	W	3–0	Straker 7', 9', Leonard 90+3'	1,475	
Second round	17 December 2013	Chesterfield	A	W	3–1	Laird 12', Straker 17', Hurst 85'	4,067	
Third round	4 January 2014	Millwall	H	W	4–1	Corr 22', Atkinson 45+6', Timlin 57', Leonard 90+5'	7,923	
Fourth round	25 January 2014	Hull City	H	L	0–2		10,250	

=== Football League Cup ===
6 August 2013 First round	Southend United	0–1	Yeovil Town	Southend-on-Sea
23:45 BST	Prosser (yellow card) 75'	Report	Dawson 36'; Webster (yellow card) 38'; Ayling (yellow card) 43'; Grant (yellow card) 45+5'; Upson (yellow card) 78'	Stadium: Roots Hall; Attendance: 2,971; Referee: Lee Collins

=== Football League Trophy ===
8 October 2013 Second round	Southend United	0–1	Dagenham & Redbridge	Southend-on-Sea
23:45 BST	Clifford (yellow card) 25'; Woodrow 51', 53'; Atkinson (yellow card) 72'	Report	Hines 26', 60'; Saah (yellow card) 12' (goal) 58'; Saunders (yellow card) 45'; Dickson 64'; Obafemi 66'; Hoyte (red card) 87'	Stadium: Roots Hall; Attendance: 3,326; Referee: Gavin Ward
