= Tommy Dixon (footballer, born 1899) =

English footballer

Personal information
- Full name: Thomas Henry Dixon
- Date of birth: 17 September 1899
- Place of birth: Seaham Harbour, England
- Position: Wing half

Senior career*
Years	Team	Apps	(Gls)
1918–1919	Murton Colliery Welfare		
1919–1920	Sunderland	0	(0)
1920–1927	Clapton Orient	234	(15)
1927–1934	Southend United	249	(7)
Total		483	(22)
- * Club domestic league appearances and goals

Thomas Henry Dixon (17 September 1899–unknown) was an English footballer who played in the Football League for Clapton Orient and Southend United.
