= Micky Stead =

English footballer

Personal information
- Full name: Michael John Stead
- Date of birth: 28 February 1957 (age 69)
- Place of birth: West Ham, England
- Height: 5 ft 8 in (1.73 m)
- Position: Fullback

Senior career*
| Years | Team | Apps | (Gls) |
| 1974–1977 | Tottenham Hotspur | 15 | (0) |
| 1977 | → Swansea City (loan) | 5 | (0) |
| 1978–1985 | Southend United | 298 | (4) |
| 1985–1988 | Doncaster Rovers | 85 | (0) |
| 1988–1989 | Fisher Athletic | ? | (?) |
| 1989–1991 | Chelmsford City | | |
| 1991–1993 | Heybridge Swifts | | |
| 1993–1994 | Dagenham & Redbridge | | |
- * Club domestic league appearances and goals

Michael John Stead (born 28 February 1957 in West Ham) is an English former professional footballer who played for Tottenham Hotspur, Swansea City, Southend United, Doncaster Rovers, Fisher Athletic, Dagenham & Redbridge Chelmsford City and Heybridge Swifts.

== Playing career ==
Stead joined Tottenham Hotspur as an apprentice in November 1974. He made his first class debut against Stoke City on 26 February 1976. The full back made 15 senior appearances for the Spurs between 1976–77. In February 1977 Stead had a loan spell at Swansea City where he featured in five matches. Stead transferred to Southend United in September 1978 and went on to score four goals in 298 games between 1978–85. Doncaster Rovers manager Dave Cusack signed Stead in November 1985 and played in a further 85 matches as player/coach. After leaving Belle Vue in 1988, Stead joined non-league club Fisher Athletic. He later played for Chelmsford City, Dagenham & Redbridge and Heybridge Swifts.

== Post-football career ==
After retiring from competitive football, Stead became a taxi driver based in Harlow, Essex.

== Honours ==
Southend United

- Football League Fourth Division: 1980–81
