= Tony Henriksen =

Danish footballer (born 1973)

Personal information
- Full name: Tony Tim Henriksen
- Date of birth: 25 April 1973 (age 53)
- Place of birth: Hammel, Denmark
- Height: 6 ft 3 in (1.91 m)

Senior career*
| Years | Team | Apps | (Gls) |
| 199?–199? | Thorsø Aidt IF | | |
| 199?–199? | Randers Freja | | |
| 199?–199? | AGF | | |
| 199?–199? | AC Horsens | | |
| 199?–1996 | Randers Freja | 0 | (0) |
| 1996–1998 | Southend United | 0 | (0) |
| 1998 | Rushden & Diamonds | 0 | (0) |
| ????–2005 | Holstebro BK | | |

International career
| 19?? | Denmark under-19 | 1 | (0) |
- * Club domestic league appearances and goals as of 09:02, 8 April 2009 (UTC)

Tony Tim Henriksen (born 25 April 1973) is a Danish former footballer who played as a goalkeeper.

Henriksen made his debut for Southend United in the FA Cup on 6 December 1997, away to Fulham in the 1–0 defeat, replacing Adrian Clark in the 56th minute after goalkeeper, Simon Royce was sent-off. In December 1998 he played one game in the Hillier Cup for Rushden & Diamonds.
