= Albert Wakefield =

English footballer

Personal information
- Full name: Albert Joseph Wakefield
- Date of birth: 19 November 1921
- Place of birth: Pudsey, England
- Date of death: November 2006 (aged 84–85)
- Place of death: Southend-on-Sea, England
- Position: Forward

Senior career*
Years	Team	Apps	(Gls)
1942–1949	Leeds United	49	(24)
1949–1953	Southend United	109	(58)
Total		158	(82)
- * Club domestic league appearances and goals

Albert Joseph Wakefield (19 November 1921 – November 2006) was an English professional footballer. He played for Leeds United and Southend United. He joined Leeds in 1942 and scored over 80 goals in a career of just five years. He moved to Southend in 1949 as part of a trade for Frank Dudley and went on to play over 100 times for them.
