= John Nielsen (footballer, born 1972) =

Danish footballer (born 1972)

Personal information
- Full name: John Schmidt Nielsen
- Date of birth: 7 April 1972 (age 54)
- Place of birth: Aarhus, Denmark
- Height: 1.73 m (5 ft 8 in)
- Position: Midfielder

Senior career*
Years	Team	Apps	(Gls)
1994–1996	Ikast	45	(2)
1996–1998	Southend United	43	(4)
1998	→ Leiftur (loan)	26	(3)
1998–1999	Viborg FF	10	(0)
2000–2003	Skive IK	100	(5)
- * Club domestic league appearances and goals

John Schmidt Nielsen (born 7 April 1972) is a Danish former association football player, who played for Ikast and Viborg FF of the Danish Superliga. He moved abroad to play professionally for Southend United and Leiftur.

== Club career ==
In summer 1996 Nielsen was signed for Southend United by player-manager Ronnie Whelan. After being allowed to join Leiftur on loan, Nielsen was handed a free transfer by Southend's subsequent manager Alvin Martin.
