= Ron Pountney =

English footballer

Personal information
- Full name: Ronald Alan Pountney
- Date of birth: 19 March 1955 (age 71)
- Place of birth: Bilston, England
- Height: 5 ft 6 in (1.68 m)
- Position: Midfielder

Senior career*
Years	Team	Apps	(Gls)
1973	Walsall	1	(0)
1973	Port Vale	0	(0)
1973–1975	Bilston		
1975–1985	Southend United	347	(26)
1985–1986	Chelmsford City		
1986–1987	Heybridge Swifts		
1987–1988	Chelmsford City		
1988–1989	Bowers United		
1989–19??	Gravesend & Northfleet		
Total		348+	(26+)
- * Club domestic league appearances and goals

Ronald Alan Pountney (born 19 March 1955) is an English former professional footballer who played as a midfielder. A West Bromwich Albion supporter, he was named after Ronnie Allen. His style of play was based on "hard work, graft and unselfishness". He was named as Southend United's Player of the Year three times. He was given a free transfer by manager Bobby Moore in 1985; however, a testimonial match against West Ham United was cancelled after West Ham had a rearranged fixture clash with the event. He eventually received a testimonial game in 2000. After retiring as a player he worked as a painter and decorator.

== Career statistics ==
Appearances and goals by club, season and competition
Club	Season	League			FA Cup		Other		Total	
Club	Season	Division	Apps	Goals	Apps	Goals	Apps	Goals	Apps	Goals
Walsall	1972–73	Third Division	1	0	0	0	0	0	1	0
Port Vale	1973–74	Third Division	0	0	0	0	0	0	0	0
Southend United	1974–75	Third Division	4	0	0	0	0	0	4	0
Southend United	1975–76	Third Division	21	1	1	0	1	0	23	1
Southend United	1976–77	Fourth Division	23	0	4	2	2	0	29	2
Southend United	1977–78	Fourth Division	24	0	2	0	0	0	26	0
Southend United	1978–79	Third Division	42	5	5	1	2	0	49	6
Southend United	1979–80	Third Division	42	4	3	0	4	1	49	5
Southend United	1980–81	Fourth Division	44	5	1	0	2	1	47	6
Southend United	1981–82	Third Division	34	4	1	0	3	0	38	4
Southend United	1982–83	Third Division	46	5	5	3	5	0	56	8
Southend United	1983–84	Third Division	31	1	2	0	5	0	38	1
Southend United	1984–85	Fourth Division	36	1	2	0	4	1	42	2
Southend United	Total		347	26	26	6	28	3	401	35
Career total			348	26	26	6	28	3	402	35

== Honours ==
Southend United

- Football League Fourth Division: 1980–81

Individual

- Southend United Player of the Year: 1979, 1980, 1983
