= Phil Gridelet =

English footballer

Personal information
- Full name: Philip Gridelet
- Date of birth: 30 April 1967 (age 59)
- Place of birth: Hendon, England
- Position: Defender

Youth career
- 1981: Queen's Park Rangers
- 1982: West Ham United
- 1983-85: Watford

Senior career*
Years	Team	Apps	(Gls)
1986–1989	Hendon		
1989-1990	Barnet		
1990–1993	Barnsley	6	(0)
1993	Rotherham United	9	(0)
1993–1998	Southend United	177	(9)
1998	Stevenage Borough	1	(0)
1999–2000	Woking	13	(0)
200?–2001	Bishop's Stortford		
2001–200?	Harrow Borough		

International career
- England semi-professional team
- * Club domestic league appearances and goals as of 16:18, 7 April 2009 (UTC)

Philip Gridelet (born 30 April 1967) is an English former footballer, who played 192 games in the Football League for Barnsley, Rotherham United and Southend United from 1990 to 1999.

== Career ==
=== Playing career ===
He played for Hendon and Barnet, before moving to Barnsley in 1990 for a fee of £175,000. He made six appearances in the League for Barnsley before moving to Rotherham United in March 1993. Gridelet signed for Southend United in September 1993, where he stayed for six-years making 177 appearances, scoring nine goals in the Football League. He then moved to Woking in December 1998, after a short spell with Stevenage Borough. Gridelet later joined Bishop's Stortford, before moving to Harrow Borough in October 2001.

=== Coaching career ===
Gridelet later moved into coaching with Harrow Borough, before leaving in March 2006. In June 2006, he was appointed as assistant-manager of Conference South club, Hayes.

=== Edge FA ===
Phil Gridelet is the academy director for St Albans-based football academy, Edge FA.

Phil has gained the UEFA A coaches license, which he uses to continuously help young players from all levels progress with their football development and careers, introducing them to local and professional clubs, and ensuring that all children, both boys and girls, enjoy playing football.
