= Alan Moody =

English footballer

Personal information
- Date of birth: 18 January 1951 (age 75)
- Place of birth: Middlesbrough, England
- Height: 6 ft 0 in (1.83 m)
- Position: Defender

Senior career*
Years	Team	Apps	(Gls)
1968–1972	Middlesbrough	46	(0)
1972–1984	Southend United	446	(41)
- Maldon Town
- * Club domestic league appearances and goals

Alan Moody (born 18 January 1951) is an English former footballer who played in the Football League for Middlesbrough and Southend United.

== Honours ==
Southend United

- Football League Fourth Division: 1980–81
