= Paul Byrne (footballer, born 1972) =

Irish former football player

Personal information
- Full name: Paul Peter Byrne
- Date of birth: 30 June 1972 (age 54)
- Place of birth: Dublin, Ireland
- Height: 1.80 m (5 ft 11 in)
- Position: Midfielder

Youth career
- Bluebell United

Senior career*
Years	Team	Apps	(Gls)
1989–1991	Oxford United	6	(0)
1991	Arsenal	0	(0)
1991–1993	Bangor	26	(8)
1993–1995	Celtic	28	(4)
1995	→ Brighton & Hove Albion (loan)	8	(1)
1995–1998	Southend United	71	(13)
1998–1999	Glenavon	15	(6)
1998–1999	Shelbourne	1	(0)
1999–2000	Bohemians	26	(6)
2000	Philadelphia Union	10	(4)
2000–2001	St. Patrick's Athletic	29	(7)
2001–2002	Bohemians	12	(2)
2002–2003	Kilkenny City	14	(2)
2003	Dundalk	9	(2)
Total		255	(55)

International career
1992	Republic of Ireland U21	2	(0)
1988	Republic of Ireland U17	1	(0)
- * Club domestic league appearances and goals

Paul Peter Byrne (born 30 June 1972) is an Irish former football player who played as a midfielder during the 1990s and 2000s.

== Club career ==
=== Early career ===
Byrne grew up in Bluebell, Dublin, and played for Bluebell United as a child before being recruited by Oxford United. He made his league debut as a 16-year-old against Barnsley. Byrne played about 30 games for Oxford and moved to Arsenal, where he spent six months in the reserve team under George Armstrong without making a first-team appearance.

=== Bangor ===
He moved to Northern Ireland and signed for Bangor in the Irish League. He scored the winning goal against Ards in the 1993 Irish Cup Final, his 21st goal of the season.

=== Celtic ===
His form attracted the interest of Liam Brady, who brought him to Celtic and gave him his debut on 6 October 1993 as a substitute against St Johnstone. He made 28 league appearances in two seasons at Celtic and scored four goals, two of them in the Old Firm derby. He went out on loan to Brighton & Hove Albion and scored once in eight appearances before returning to Celtic.

=== Southend United ===
In August 1995 he left Celtic and signed for Ronnie Whelan's Southend United side for a fee of £80,000. He started well at Southend, impressing Birmingham City enough for them to make a £750,000 bid for him. Southend were relegated at the end of his second season at Roots Hall.

=== Glenavon ===
Byrne returned to Northern Ireland and signed for Glenavon, where he won another Irish Cup winners' medal.

=== Bohemians ===
After playing a few reserve games for Shelbourne, Byrne signed for Bohemians in January 1999. Bohemians struggled that season and avoided relegation only by beating Cobh Ramblers in a relegation play-off. The following season they challenged Shelbourne for the title before finishing third. They also reached the FAI Cup Final with Byrne as captain, but lost 1–0 to Shelbourne.

=== Philadelphia ===
When his contract at Dalymount Park expired, Byrne spent the summer months playing in Philadelphia, in the United States.

=== St Patrick's Athletic ===
He returned to Ireland in time for the start of the 2000–01 season and signed for his home-town club, St Patrick's Athletic.

=== Back to Bohemians ===
He spent only a few months at Richmond Park before Roddy Collins arrived, and Byrne returned to Bohemians just before the transfer deadline. He scored with his first touch on his return, a 20-yard free kick, in a 2–2 draw with Galway United in February 2001. Byrne played a minor role as Bohemians won the league title, their first in 23 years. A week later, they completed the Double by winning the FAI Cup, but Byrne did not play, as he was cup-tied after appearing in an earlier round for St Patrick's Athletic.

Collins left after the double-winning season, and Pete Mahon replaced him as manager. After reaching the second qualifying round of the UEFA Champions League, Bohemians had a poor run of league form, and Mahon lost his job. Under his successor, Stephen Kenny, Byrne was not a regular starter. He played in that season's FAI Cup final, which Bohemians lost 2–1 to Dundalk. Kenny released several players after the season, Byrne among them.

=== Later career ===
Byrne went on to play for Kilkenny City, Dundalk, St James' Gate and Houston Hurricanes FC.

== International career ==
Byrne was capped at Under-15, Under-16, Under-17, Under-18, Under-21 level and "B" level for Ireland and was included in numerous full international squad but never made an appearance. Byrne played in two qualifiers in the 1990 UEFA European Under-18 Football Championship qualifying campaign and in the 1990 UEFA European Under-18 Championship.

== Awards ==
Byrne won Northern Ireland PFA Player of the Year and Northern Ireland Football Writers' Association Player of the Year in 1993 while playing for Bangor F.C.

== Personal life ==
In September 2024, Byrne appeared in court, accused of assaulting a woman. As of March 2025, a trial date was reportedly set for June 2026.
