= Julian Hails =

English footballer

Personal information
- Date of birth: 20 November 1967 (age 58)
- Place of birth: Lincoln, England
- Position: Midfielder

Senior career*
| Years | Team | Apps | (Gls) |
| 1989–1990 | Hemel Hempstead Town | ? | (?) |
| 1990–1994 | Fulham | 109 | (12) |
| 1994–2000 | Southend United | 164 | (7) |
- * Club domestic league appearances and goals as of 22:48, 6 April 2009 (UTC)

Julian Hails (born 20 November 1967) is an English former professional footballer who played in the Football League as a midfielder for Fulham and Southend United.

== Biography ==
=== Football career ===
Hails was studying for a maths degree and playing part-time at Hemel Hempstead Town, before being offered a trial at Fulham. Part of the deal that took Hails to Fulham was that he could stay on and finish his degree. He joined Fulham permanently in 1990. He played as a right winger for Fulham, a position his father used to play for Lincoln City, Peterborough United, Luton Town and Northampton Town. Hails made 126 appearances in all competitions scoring 13 goals, being voted as the "Player of the Season" by Fulham fans during his spell with the London club.

Peter Taylor signed Hails for Southend United in early December 1994. He made 182 appearances for Southend in all competitions scoring seven goals. Hails was moved into the right-back position in September 1997, when Alvin Martin took control as the manager. He won the "Player of the Season" award that season after a number of impressive performances. He was forced to retire in 2000, after a two-year struggle with knee injuries.

=== Life after football ===
Hails has a BSc honours in Mathematical Studies. After retiring from football he taught Maths at Sir John Lawes school, STAHS and Haberdashers' Boys' School where he was also Head of Football and Tennis. He now works in the Education team at Tottenham Hotspur FC's Academy.

== Personal life ==
Hails was born in Lincoln and is married. He now lives with his wife and 3 sons in Hertfordshire. His father, William, was also a professional footballer in the 1950s and 1960s, who played for Lincoln City, Peterborough United, Luton Town and Northampton Town.
