= Dave Cusack =

English footballer (born 1956)

Personal information
- Full name: David Stephen Cusack
- Date of birth: 6 June 1956 (age 70)
- Place of birth: Thurcroft, England
- Height: 6 ft 3 in (1.91 m)
- Position: Defender

Senior career*
Years	Team	Apps	(Gls)
1975–1978	Sheffield Wednesday	95	(1)
1978–1983	Southend United	186	(17)
1983–1985	Millwall	98	(9)
1985–1987	Doncaster Rovers	100	(4)
1987–1988	Rotherham United	18	(0)
1988–1990	Boston United	56	(1)
1990	Doncaster Rovers	1	(0)
1990–1991	Boston United	31	(0)

Managerial career
- 1985–1987: Doncaster Rovers
- 1987–1988: Rotherham United
- 1990–1992: Boston United
- 1992: Kettering Town
- 1994–1995: Dagenham & Redbridge
- * Club domestic league appearances and goals

David Stephen Cusack (born 6 June 1956) is an English former footballer and manager whose last position before retirement in 2015 was director of Essex Senior League club Basildon United. A central defender, he made over 500 appearances in a career spanning 16 years.

== Early life ==
Born in Thurcroft, as a child Cusack attended school in Thurcroft and later went to Wales High School.

== Career ==
Cusack began his career with Sheffield Wednesday, making his way through the club's youth system and also captaining the reserve side. After making 95 league appearances for the side, he moved to Southend United in 1978 for a then club record £50,000, where he would win the Fourth Division championship in 1981. A move to Millwall followed the following year for £30,000.

He moved to Doncaster Rovers as player-manager in 1985, replacing Billy Bremner. The 1985–86 season would see Doncaster emerge as promotion contenders before eventually finishing 11th place, which would be one of Doncaster's highest placings in the league since relegation from the Second Division in 1958 and until recent times. Another mid-table finish (following a promising start) came the following season but Doncaster were facing relegation by 1988 and Cusack left the club during the season. Cusack took over at Rotherham United with the Millers in mid-table, but left in April and a slide down the league led to a promotion/relegation play-off with Swansea City which was lost.

He later became player-manager at Boston United. In 1992, he spent a short spell as manager of Kettering Town but, with the club in financial turmoil, Cusack was sacked following the appointment of new owners after taking charge of just seven games.

== Honours ==
Southend United

- Football League Fourth Division: 1980–81
