= Paul Sansome =

English footballer (born 1961)

Personal information
- Full name: Paul Eric Sansome
- Date of birth: 6 October 1961 (age 65)
- Place of birth: New Addington, England
- Height: 6 ft 0 in (1.83 m)
- Position: Goalkeeper

Youth career
- Crystal Palace

Senior career*
Years	Team	Apps	(Gls)
1979–1980	Crystal Palace	0	(0)
1980–1988	Millwall	156	(0)
1988–1997	Southend United	308	(0)
1996	→ Birmingham City (loan)	1	(0)
1996	→ Gravesend & Northfleet (loan)		
2001–2002	Southend United	0	(0)
- * Club domestic league appearances and goals

Paul Eric Sansome (born 6 October 1961) is an English former professional footballer who played as a goalkeeper. He made more than 150 appearances in the Football League for Millwall and more than 300 for Southend United.

== Football career ==
Sansome was born in New Addington, London. His football career began at local club Crystal Palace, from where he moved to Millwall on a free transfer in April 1980 aged 18. He made his first-team debut in March 1982 and went on to make nearly 200 appearances for the club in all competitions. During his time at Millwall he was on the winning side in the Football League Group Cup final in 1982–83, and won the club's Player of the Year award while helping them to promotion from the Third Division in 1984–85.

He joined Southend United for a fee of £40,000 in March 1988 and went on to make more than 350 appearances for the club, including helping them to successive promotions, from the Fourth Division in 1989–90 and from the Third Division as runners-up the following season. He moved to First Division side Birmingham City on loan during the 1995–96 season, when both Ian Bennett and Bart Griemink were unavailable, making one appearance in the League Cup and one in the league. Later that year he was loaned to Gravesend & Northfleet, then playing in the Southern League.

He made a comeback with Southend in the 2001–02 season, joining his former club on a non-contract basis as goalkeeping cover, and was named among the substitutes for the game against Luton Town, for which Darryl Flahavan was suspended.

== Honours ==
Millwall

- Football League Group Cup: 1982–83
