= Southend United F.C. =

Association football club in England

Southend United
- Full name: Southend United Football Club
- Nicknames: The Shrimpers; The Blues; The Seasiders
- Founded: 19 May 1906; 120 years ago
- Ground: Roots Hall
- Capacity: 12,392 (restricted to 10,508)
- Coordinates: 51.5490°N 0.7018°E
- Chairman: Justin Rees
- Head Coach: Kieron Dyer
- League: National League
- 2025–26: National League, 6th of 24
- Website: southendunited.co.uk
Home colours	Away colours	Third colours

Southend United Football Club is a professional association football club based in Southend-on-Sea, Essex, England, which competes in the National League, the fifth level of English football. The team are known as "The Shrimpers", a reference to the area's maritime industry that is included as one of the quarters on the club badge. The club has a long-standing rivalry with Colchester United, with which it contests the Essex derby. Southend United is based at Roots Hall Stadium in Prittlewell, Southend-on-Sea.

Founded on 19 May 1906 in the Blue Boar Hotel, Southend won the Southern League Second Division in both of its two initial seasons and was admitted into the Football League in 1920. It spent the next 44 years in the third tier of English football, before dropping into the Fourth Division in 1966. They spent the next 24 years moving between the third and fourth tiers, winning promotions in 1971–72, 1977–78, 1980–81 (as champions), 1986–87 and 1989–90. They were promoted into the Second Division for the first time at the end of the 1990–91 season. After six seasons in the second tier they suffered a double relegation in 1997 and 1998. Under manager Steve Tilson, Southend again secured a double promotion in 2004–05 and 2005–06 to win a place in the Championship as League One champions. However, they only lasted one season in the second tier and then, after two top half League One finishes, were relegated back to League Two in 2010. They secured promotion as play-off winners in 2015, but suffered another double relegation in 2020 and 2021, amid deep financial problems that several times pushed the club to the brink of liquidation, to drop—after 101 years in the Football League—into the National League, where they remain. In 2026, they won their first FA Trophy title.

== History ==
=== 1906–1920: Foundation and early years ===
Southend United Football Club was founded on 19 May 1906 in the Blue Boar Hotel after landlord Oliver Trigg invited a group of footballers and businessmen to discuss setting up a new professional club. (Note: When the club was incorporated on 1 August 1906, Trigg was among the club's initial five directors, listed as proprietor of the Blue Boar Hotel; others were a licensed victualler (Frederick England, of the Nelson Hotel in Prittlewell), a London stock-broker (Charles Albert Stein), an agent (George Hutton Hogsflesh), and a merchant and cigar importer (Tom Stuart Tidy).) The new Southend United would displace the more prominent Southend Athletic in the town, who later disbanded. A prospectus for shares in the club issued in August 1906 noted the club had been elected to compete in the Second Division of the Southern League and in the South Eastern League, and a seven-year lease had been agreed to play at Roots Hall Field in Prittlewell.

Robert Jack ("late of Plymouth Argyle Football Club") was appointed as manager, secretary and player, and 12 professional players were recruited, including two - outside left Alfred Ernest Watkins (formerly at Millwall) and back George Molyneux (formerly at Portsmouth) - listed as internationals (Watkins had played for Wales, Molyneux for England). (Note: As well as the initial five directors, the prospectus listed three additional shareholders: Andrew Ducat, a builder, Archibald Howard, a canvasser, and John Holton, a chartered accountant.) Other signings included goalkeeper Charles Cotton from West Ham, outside right Arthur Holden from Portsmouth, and centre-forward Harold Halse from Wanstead, plus players from Southend Athletic, Grays United, South Weald and Leigh Ramblers. In the Southern League Second Division, Southend would primarily compete against reserve teams.

In their first season under Jack's management, Southend won the Southern League Second Division title for 1906–07, then repeated the feat the following season, gaining election to the Southern League First Division in 1908. The club first entered the FA Cup in 1907–08, where they met East Ham. When Jack left Southend in 1910, he was succeeded as player-manager by Molyneux. Southend were relegated back to the Second Division after the 1910–11 season, but returned to the First Division two seasons later as runners-up. However, World War I disrupted the club's progress. To aid the country's war effort, parts of the club's ground Roots Hall were dismantled and requisitioned to a nearby timber yard where buildings had been destroyed by bombs. After the war, Roots Hall was unusable so Southend moved to 'The Kursaal'.

=== 1920s–1980s: Establishment in the Football League ===
Chart of table positions of Southend in the English football league system

The club remained in the Southern League until the first post-World War I season of 1919–20. The club then joined the Football League's new Third Division and finished 17th in their first season. In 1921, the Third Division was regionalised with Southend United joining the Third Division South. In their second Football League season, Southend had to apply for re-election. However, from 1922, under new manager Ted Birnie, the club began to stabilise and began to challenge for promotion to the Second Division, finishing third in 1932. After a successful twelve years, Birnie left to be replaced in May 1934 by David Jack, son of the club's first manager, and the Shrimpers moved from the Kursaal to the Southend Stadium. A highlight of Jack's six-year tenure saw Southend draw 4–4 in the FA Cup third round at White Hart Lane against Tottenham Hotspur in January 1936 before losing the replay. Following the start of World War II, the 1939–40 season was abandoned. In the 1948–49 season, the Shrimpers narrowly avoided a re-election vote. Southend came close to promotion when they finished third in 1950 (the club's joint highest league position until 1991). Southend remained in the Third Division South until the re-structuring of the Football League in 1958.

Southend United joined the new national Third Division in 1958, where they remained until 1966 when they suffered their first relegation, into the Fourth Division. The club had to wait six seasons until 1972 to experience the club's first promotion, as runners-up behind Grimsby Town. In 1976 Southend suffered relegation again before taking another runners-up spot behind Watford in 1978. Another relegation in 1980 was directly followed by one of the most successful seasons in the club's history as they won the Fourth Division Championship in 1981, breaking a series of club records in the process. Despite success on the pitch and low admission prices, the club's gates were low and condemned as "a bad reflection on the town".

=== 1984–2000 ===
In 1984, the club was relegated to the Fourth Division with Bobby Moore as manager, and the following season finished 20th, narrowly avoiding having to seek re-election to the Football League. However, Southend gained promotion in 1987. Although relegated again in 1989 (albeit with the highest point total of any relegated team in League history), successive promotions in 1990 and the 1991–92 season saw Southend United reach the second tier of the Football League; in 1992, under manager David Webb, the club finished 12th in the old Second Division, having briefly topped the division on New Year's Day, 1992.

Southend United were then managed by Colin Murphy and Barry Fry. Fry moved to Southend United in 1993 with the club bottom of Division One. Fry kept Southend up, but later in the year moved to Birmingham City. He was succeeded by former Shrimpers player Peter Taylor in his first managerial role in the Football League. He spent two years between 1993 and 1995 as manager, but quit at the end of the 1994–95 season after failing to get them beyond the middle of the Division One table. In 1995, former Liverpool player Ronnie Whelan became player-manager. Southend finished 14th in Division One in his first season as a manager, but were relegated a year later and Whelan left the club, later winning a case for wrongful dismissal. He was replaced by Alvin Martin who was unable to avoid a second consecutive relegation.

Martin Dawn PLC (run by Ron Martin) and Delancey Estates, together forming South Eastern Leisure (SEL), took control of Southend United in November 1998, buying the club and its centrally located Roots Hall ground for £4 million from then chairman Vic Jobson, who at the time owned 55% of the issued share capital of the club. (The transfer of Roots Hall's ownership to Roots Hall Limited - 50% owned by Martin Dawn - was to have ramifications almost 25 years later.) Jobson had previously sold part of the ground's South Bank for housing, and SEL's plan was to continue the redevelopment and move the club to a proposed 16,000-seat ground, Fossetts Farm Stadium, in a leisure redevelopment in the northern part of Southend.

Alvin Martin left in April 1999, with Southend fifth from bottom in the Football League.

=== Early 21st century ===
Alan Little was manager for a brief spell, helping them to avoid the drop into the Football Conference and also helped them survive a serious financial crisis by slashing the wage bill and rebuilding a much cheaper side. The club's first flirtation with the High Court came in July 2000, when a debt to the Inland Revenue was paid off shortly before a scheduled winding-up petition hearing. Little's dismissal in September 2000 came as a surprise as, despite a poor start to the season, it followed a five-game unbeaten run that saw 'the Shrimpers' rise to 10th in the Third Division. He was replaced by David Webb on 2 October 2000, soon after Ron Martin had taken over as chairman. The club then turned to Rob Newman, Steve Wignall and, in late 2003, former Southend United midfielder Steve Tilson.

Under Tilson, Southend reached their first national cup final, meeting Blackpool in the 2004 final of the Football League Trophy at the Millennium Stadium in Cardiff. Over 20,000 Southend fans travelled, but the team did not rise to the occasion and Blackpool won 2–0. Tilson then led Southend to promotion to League One in 2005, while making a second successive appearance in the Football League Trophy final, which the Shrimpers lost 2–0 to Wrexham, but the third appearance at the Millennium Stadium in the League Two play-off final against Lincoln City brought success giving the club its first promotion via the play-off system and their first major silverware since 1981.

In May 2006 Southend became League One champions after beating Bristol City 1–0 at Roots Hall in front of over 11,000 fans - the club's first title in 25 years. Southend started the 2006–07 season well but then did not win a league game for 18 games until December 2006. In the meantime, however, Southend did beat trophy holders and Premier League Champions Manchester United 1–0 in a League Cup fourth round tie, with Freddy Eastwood scoring the winner. Southend briefly escaped the relegation zone in March 2007 but only 10 league wins in the season meant the Shrimpers were relegated back to League One. Southend finished sixth in League One at the end of 2007–08, qualifying for a play-off place. Against Doncaster Rovers, Southend drew the home leg 0–0, but lost the second leg 5–1. The following season, Southend finished 8th, missing out on a play-off place, but the 2009–10 season was tougher: a run of just one win in 2010 left Southend deep in trouble, and relegation to League Two was confirmed on 24 April 2010. On 4 July 2010 manager Steve Tilson was put on gardening leave, ending his seven-year stint as manager.

=== 2010s ===
During the 2009–10 season, Southend faced two winding-up orders from HM Revenue and Customs over unpaid tax bills. In February 2010 Southend players were not paid, the Professional Footballers Association had to pay the players, and the club were placed under a transfer embargo until they paid the money back. In March 2010 Southend were given a 35-day extension to pay the unpaid bill or face administration, and further seven day extension in April 2010. On 20 April 2010 the bill was paid, and in August 2010 all actions against Southend United were dropped and an agreement was reached with HMRC.

On 5 July 2010 former Sheffield Wednesday and Plymouth Argyle manager, Paul Sturrock was announced as the new manager. Sturrock led Southend to a 13th place in his first season, but the club mounted a more serious challenge the following season, spending 11 weeks at the top of League Two before a decline in form meant the team had to enter the play-offs. Southend lost the play off semi-final against Crewe Alexandra 3–2 on aggregate.

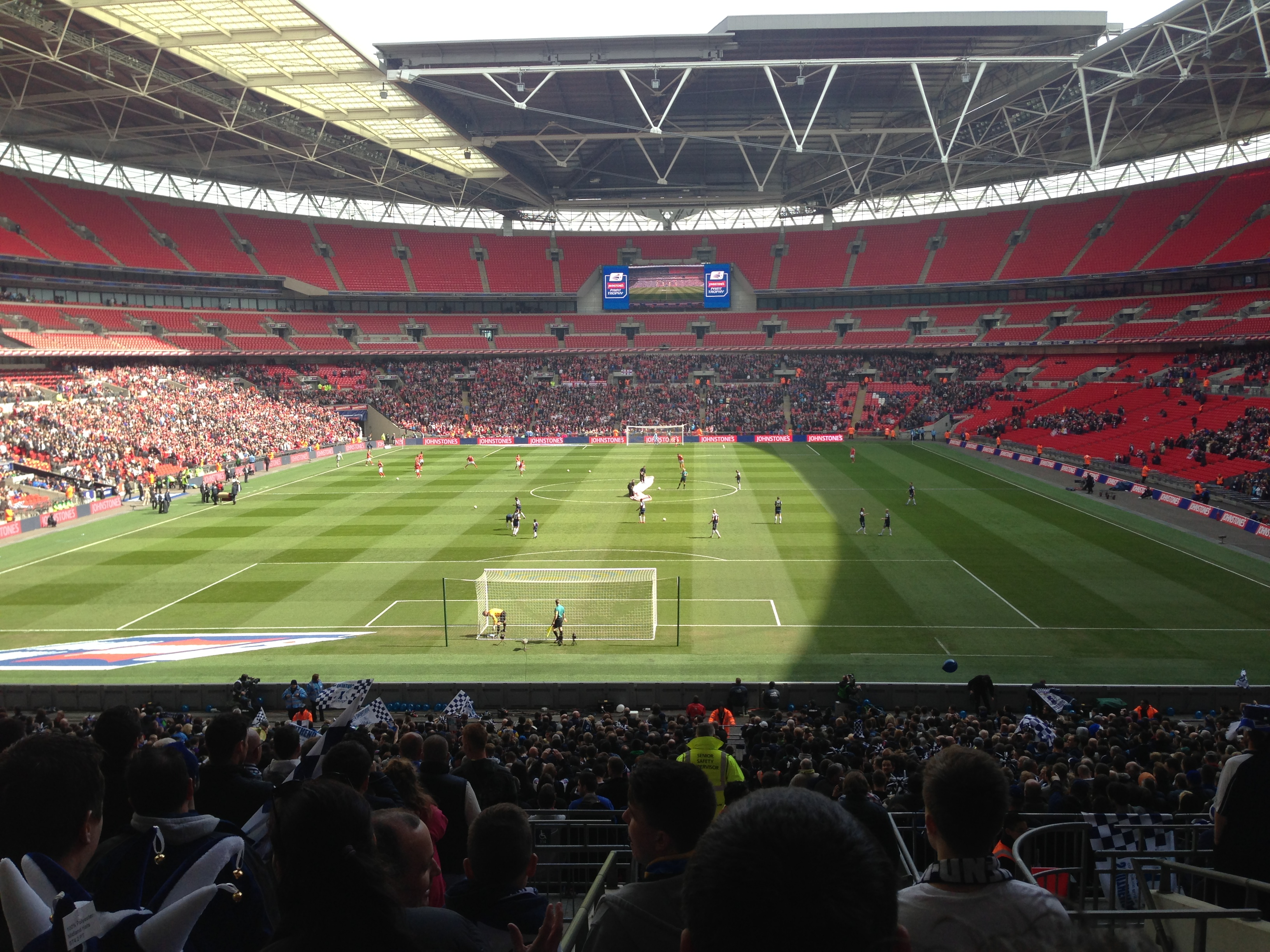
Southend United at Wembley

A transfer embargo at the start of the 2012–13 season saw the club start its campaign with a depleted squad. However, a successful loan signing - Britt Assombalonga from Watford - helped Southend to a run of 14 games unbeaten which saw them reach 4th in the table. League form dipped in early 2013, but the club reached its first Wembley cup final in the Football League Trophy. Paul Sturrock was sacked two weeks before the cup final. Nevertheless, the Blues took 33,000 fans to the match, but lost 2–0 to Crewe Alexandra.

Phil Brown was brought in as Sturrock's successor. In 2015 Brown led the team, via a play-off final against Wycombe Wanderers (decided 7–6 on penalties), into League One. At the end of the 2016–17 season, the club missed the play-offs in League One by one point. The following season, Southend finished 10th, but slipped to 19th at the end of the 2018–19 season, avoiding relegation on goal difference. On 22 October 2019, Sol Campbell was appointed manager of Southend.

=== 2020–2024: Financial difficulties and double relegation ===
Financial difficulties resulted in non-payment of Southend players' and other employees' wages several times during the 2019–20 season. A HMRC winding-up petition was adjourned four times during 2020. In April 2020, during the COVID-19 pandemic, Southend put "several staff and some players" on furlough under the UK Government's emergency job retention scheme - a move criticised by the PFA who said the club had "consistently" let players down over wages. On 9 June, EFL League One and Two clubs agreed to end the 2019–20 season; Southend were relegated to League Two. On 30 June 2020, manager Campbell left the club, to be later succeeded by Mark Molesley and then Phil Brown, but Southend suffered a second successive relegation, dropping out of the Football League after 101 years.

In October 2020, after the club settled tax debts of £493,931 with HMRC, a winding-up petition was dismissed by the High Court. In August 2021, Southend revealed their overall debt in July 2019 was £17.4M. On 5 and 9 October 2021, Southend fans staged protests demanding Martin's departure. Brown was sacked in October, and was replaced by Kevin Maher. Southend finished their first National League season in 13th position.

In September 2022, the club was placed under a transfer embargo after a missed HMRC payment, and in October 2022, HMRC issued a winding-up petition. Wages in late 2022 and early 2023 were paid late. The January 2023 HMRC winding-up hearing was adjourned again, to 1 March 2023. Less than 24 hours before the winding-up hearing, the club said it had paid the £1.4M tax bill, and the winding-up petition was dismissed, but a transfer embargo remained in place. The club finished their second National League season in eighth position; non-playing staff at the club had not been paid for the past two months.

On 17 March 2023, the club was put up for sale as its financial difficulties continued, and on 4 May 2023 the club was served another HMRC winding-up petition—their 18th. The hearing was adjourned twice to give Martin more time to sell the club. In July 2023, after repeated late payment of club staff wages, players refused to resume pre-season training until they were paid. While players were eventually paid, manager Maher and other backroom staff remained unpaid three days before the winding-up hearing, while club sale discussions were reportedly being held up by the stadium side of the transaction; Martin said he would sell his stake in the club for £1, but wanted £4.5M for Roots Hall. The club also needed £1M "in the short term" to settle its latest HMRC winding-up petition and lift a transfer embargo. Football debts were settled in July 2023, allowing the club to remain in the National League. However the HMRC debt was not paid in full leading to a 10 point deduction by the league.

On 23 August 2023, the winding-up hearing was adjourned for a third and final time, to 4 October. In September 2023, the Justin Rees consortium said that two bids to Ron Martin had been rejected, and fans staged further anti-Martin protests. In October 2023, the sale of the club to the Justin Rees consortium was agreed, but formal completion was repeatedly delayed. The deal was announced the day before the High Court hearing of HMRC's winding-up petition, the HMRC debt was paid, and the winding-up petition was duly dismissed. In December 2023, Martin and the Rees consortium exchanged contracts for the sale of the club, and, after 15 months, Southend's transfer embargo was lifted. Southend finished the 2023–24 National League season in 9th place.

Another winding-up petition hearing was held on 15 May, when the consortium and Martin sought a six-week adjournment. The club was given six weeks to settle with creditors or face liquidation.

=== 2024–present: COSU ownership ===
As a consequence of the unresolved winding-up order, Southend were placed under a fresh transfer embargo. Settlements were agreed with creditors, the winding-up petition was dismissed in the High Court, and on 19 July 2024, the COSU consortium headed by Justin Rees completed its takeover of Southend United.

On the pitch, Southend finished the 2024–25 National League season in the play-off places, eventually meeting Oldham Athletic in the final at Wembley Stadium but lost 3–2 after extra time. The following season, 2025–26, Southend reached the FA Trophy final and again finished in the National League play-off places, but lost their qualifying match against Scunthorpe United. On 17 May 2026, Southend returned to Wembley and beat Wealdstone in a penalty shootout to win the FA Trophy. Two days later, head coach Kevin Maher plus coaching staff Darren Currie and Mark Bentley were sacked following a review of the 2025–26 season, with former England midfielder Kieron Dyer appointed as the new head coach on 8 June 2026.

== Club identity ==
Tables of kit suppliers and shirt sponsors appear below:

Years	Kit manufacturer	Shirt sponsor
1975–1978	Admiral	Motor Plan
1978–1981	Bukta	Charterhouse
1983–1984	Bukta	Motor Plan
1985–1986	Bukta	Laing
1986–1988	Bukta	Firholm
1988–1990	Spall	Firholm
1990–1991	Spall	Hi-Tec
1991–1992	Beaver	Hi-Tec
1992–1994	Beaver	Elonex
1994–1995	Beaver	Crevette
1995–1996	Beaver	United Artists
1996–1998	Olympic Sportswear	Telewest Communications
1998–1999	Olympic Sportswear	Progressive Printing
1999–2000	Rossco	Progressive Printing
2000–2001	Pier Sport	Rebus (Home); Wyndham Plastics (Away)
2001–2002	Hi-Tec	Rebus
2002–2003	Sport House	Martin Dawn
2003–2004	Nike	GKC Communications (Home); Wyndham Plastics (Away)
2004–2006	Nike	Betterview Windows and Conservatories
2006–2014	Nike	InsureandGo
2014–2017	Nike	Martin Dawn
2017–2018	Nike	The Amy May Trust
2018–2019	Nike	Prostate Cancer UK
2019–2020	Nike	Paddy Power
2020–2021	Hummel	Watchlotto.com
2021–2022	Macron	Trade Price Cars
2022–2023	Macron	PG Site Services
2023–2024	Macron	Solopress
2024–2026	Macron	c2c
2026-	Erreà	c2c

== Grounds ==
The club has played its home games at five grounds: the original Roots Hall, the Kursaal, the Southend Stadium, the rented New Writtle Street Stadium (home of Chelmsford City) and again at Roots Hall.

Roots Hall was the first stadium that the club owned and was built on the site of their original home, albeit at a lower level. The site previous to Southend purchasing it in 1952 had been used as a sand quarry, by the council as a landfill site and by the local gas board (which was convinced to move to Progress Road). The stadium was built by Sid Broomfield and a small band of individuals at a cost of £73,997, supported by a small grant from the FA and funds raised by the Supporters Club. Following construction, the ground was donated to the club by the fans.

It took 10 years to fully complete the building of Roots Hall. The first game was played on 20 August 1955, a 3–1 Division Three (South) victory over Norwich City (attendance 12,190), but the ground was far from complete. The main East Stand had barely been fitted and ran along only 50 yards of the touchline, and only a few steps of terracing encircled the ground, with the North, West and the huge South Bank still largely unconcreted. The North Stand had a single-barrelled roof which ran only the breadth of the penalty area, and the West Bank was covered at its rear only by a similar structure.

Although the ground was unfinished, during the inaugural season this was the least of the club's worries, for the pitch at Roots Hall showed the consequences of having been laid on top of thousands of tonnes of compacted rubbish. Drainage was a problem, and the wet winter turned the ground into a quagmire. The pitch was completely re-laid in the summer of 1956 and a proper drainage system, which is still in place, was constructed, and the West Bank roof was extended to reach the touchline, creating a unique double-barrelled structure.

The terracing was completed soon after, but the task of completely terracing all 72 steps of the South Bank was not completed until 1964. The North Bank roof was extended in the early 1960s, and the East Stand was extended to run the full length of the pitch in 1966. Floodlights were also installed during this period. Roots Hall was designed to hold 35,000 spectators, with over 15,000 on the South Bank alone, but the highest recorded attendance at the ground is 31,090 for an FA Cup third round tie with Liverpool in January 1979.

Until 1988 Roots Hall was still the newest ground in the Football League, but then the ground saw a significant change. United had hit bad times in the mid-1980s and new chairman Vic Jobson sold virtually all of the South Bank for development, leaving just a tiny block of 15 steps. In 1994, seats were installed onto the original terracing, and a second tier was added. The West Bank had already become seated in 1992 upon United's elevation to Division Two while the East Stand paddock also received a new seating deck, bolted and elevated from the terracing below. In 1995 the Gilbert & Rose West Stand roof was extended to meet up with the North and South Stands, with seating installed in each corner, thus giving the Roots Hall its current form, with a capacity of just under 12,500.

On 24 January 2007, Southend Borough Council unanimously agreed to give planning permission for a new 22,000-seater stadium at the proposed Fossetts Farm site, with Rochford District Council following suit 24 hours later. The application was subsequently submitted to Ruth Kelly, then Secretary of State for Communities and Local Government, for government approval. However, the application was "called in" at the beginning of April 2007. The inquiry began in September 2007, followed in October 2007 by a "final" inquiry, when chairman Ron Martin called for supporters to show in numbers at Southend's local government headquarters. On 6 March 2008, permission to develop Fossetts Farm was given by the government. However, it took a further 12 years before firm plans emerged for the development; in April 2020, a deal was agreed between Southend United, the borough council and social housing provider Citizen Housing. Plans were approved in October 2021, subject to Government approval anticipated in early 2022; the 22,000-capacity stadium would incorporate a 107-bed hotel and high-rise residential blocks of 182 homes on two corners.

In September 2022, after the club had been unable to get a hotel operator on board, plans to build a hotel at the proposed new stadium were dropped in favour of 42 additional homes, taking the total to 224 homes. A revised planning application also outlined plans to lower the stadium capacity to 16,226 seats. In February 2023, applications for the additional homes and smaller stadium were both still to be decided by Southend Council as information had not been provided by the club. Scaled-back plans for the ground were eventually submitted to the council in late March 2023.

In September 2023, the Justin Rees consortium buying the club highlighted "the non-viability of a new stadium at Fossetts Farm" and proposed Martin should develop Fossetts Farm without a new stadium requirement. In October 2023, following agreement on the club's sale to the consortium (the deal was completed in July 2024), the club was set to remain at Roots Hall, with the 500 homes once planned for the site now transferred to Fossetts Farm. In June 2025, the club appointed AFL Architects to work on redeveloping Roots Hall, seeking a 'community-driven transformation' of the ground.

== Rivalries ==
=== Colchester United ===
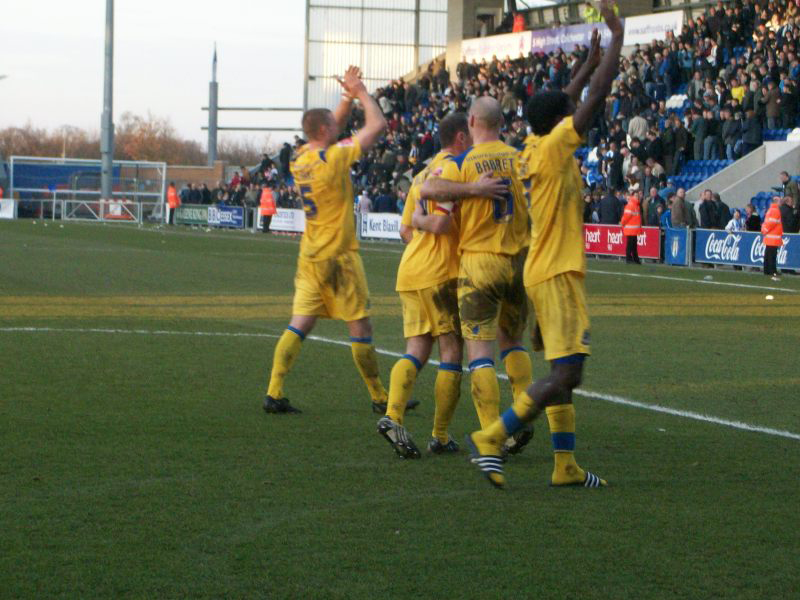
Southend players

The club has an intense local rivalry with fellow Essex side Colchester United, which extends back many years.

However, at the end of the 1989–90 season, Southend's promotion from the Football League Fourth Division coincided with Colchester's fall from the Football League, so the clubs had to wait almost 15 years before meeting again in competition in 2004, when they contested the Southern Final of the Football League Trophy; the Shrimpers won 4–3 on aggregate, securing their first ever appearance in a national cup final. In the following season, the two clubs met again in an Essex derby match in the same competition, with Southend emerging as the victors once again after a penalty shootout.

The two clubs were promoted from League One at the end of the 2005–06 season, after a long battle for top spot was eventually won by Southend. The overall competitive head-to-head record for the rivalry stands at 34 wins for Southend, 30 wins for Colchester, and 17 draws. The most recent match, and the largest Essex derby victory, was on 10 November 2020, when Colchester beat Southend 6–1 at the Community Stadium in an EFL Trophy group stage match.

=== Leyton Orient ===
There is also a fierce rivalry between Southend and Leyton Orient, which arises from the time between 1998 and 2005, when the Essex club were Orient's geographically closest league rivals. Although the games between the two teams are eagerly anticipated, and Southend are considered to be Orient's main rivals, the Shrimpers see the London club as secondary rivals to Colchester United, for geographical and historical reasons.

The Shrimpers beat the O's in the 2012–13 Football League Trophy Southern Area final. Southend won 1–0 at Brisbane Road in the first leg of the area final and drew 2–2 at Roots Hall in the second leg, winning 3–2 on aggregate, despite being in a lower division than Orient at the time, to book a place at Wembley in the final against Crewe Alexandra.

== Players ==
As of 10 October 2026

=== Current squad ===
Note: Flags indicate national team as defined under FIFA eligibility rules; some limited exceptions apply. Players may hold more than one non-FIFA nationality.

No.	Pos.	Nation	Player
1	GK	WAL	Joe Duncan (on loan from Bristol City)
2	DF	ENG	Vontae Daley-Campbell
3	DF	ENG	Kyle McAdam
4	MF	ENG	Anthony Hartigan
5	DF	GRE	Rayan Oyebade (on loan from West Ham United)
6	DF	ENG	Ben Goodliffe
7	FW	NED	Sahid Kamara
8	MF	ENG	Darren Oldaker
9	FW	SCO	Harry Cardwell
10	MF	ENG	Sam Austin
11	MF	WAL	Lewys Twamley
13	GK	ENG	Jack Sims
14	FW	IRL	Promise Omochere (on loan from Bristol Rovers)

No.	Pos.	Nation	Player
16	DF	ENG	Harry Taylor
17	FW	ENG	Zavier Massiah-Edwards (non-contract basis)
18	DF	IRL	Sean Keogh (on loan from Brighton & Hove Albion)
19	MF	ENG	Leon Chambers-Parillon
20	DF	WAL	Dan Cox
21	MF	ENG	Rico Richards
22	MF	ENG	Tommy Backwell
23	FW	ENG	Josh Popoola
27	FW	ENG	Ryan Colclough
28	MF	ENG	Oli Coker (captain)
30	GK	ENG	Joshua Barrett
—	DF	ENG	Ashley Palmer (on loan from York City)

=== Current U23 squad ===
Note: Flags indicate national team as defined under FIFA eligibility rules; some limited exceptions apply. Players may hold more than one non-FIFA nationality.

No.	Pos.	Nation	Player
12	FW	ENG	Jack Stone
30	GK	ENG	Josh Barrett

No.	Pos.	Nation	Player
—	DF	ENG	Mitchell Ward
—	FW	BUL	Nikolay Zlatev

=== Player of the Year ===
- 1965–66 Tony Bentley
- 1966–67 Trevor Roberts
- 1967–68 Billy Best
- 1968–69 John Kurila
- 1969–70 Billy Best
- 1970–71 Alex Smith
- 1971–72 Brian Albeson & Bill Garner
- 1972–73 Terry Johnson
- 1973–74 Chris Guthrie
- 1974–75 Alan Moody
- 1975–76 Alan Little
- 1976–77 Andy Ford
- 1977–78 Colin Morris
- 1978–79 Ron Pountney
- 1979–80 Ron Pountney
- 1980–81 Derek Spence
- 1981–82 Dave Cusack
- 1982–83 Ron Pountney
- 1983–84 Micky Stead
- 1984–85 Steve Phillips
- 1985–86 Richard Cadette
- 1986–87 Jim Stannard
- 1987–88 Dave Martin
- 1988–89 David Crown
- 1989–90 Paul Sansome
- 1990–91 Peter Butler
- 1991–92 Brett Angell
- 1992–93 Stan Collymore
- 1993–94 Chris Powell
- 1994–95 Ronnie Whelan
- 1995–96 Simon Royce
- 1996–97 Keith Dublin
- 1997–98 Julian Hails
- 1998–99 Mark Beard
- 1999–2000 Nathan Jones
- 2000–01 Kevin Maher
- 2001–02 Darryl Flahavan
- 2002–03 Leon Cort
- 2003–04 Mark Gower
- 2004–05 Adam Barrett
- 2005–06 Freddy Eastwood
- 2006–07 Kevin Maher
- 2007–08 Nicky Bailey
- 2008–09 Peter Clarke
- 2009–10 Simon Francis
- 2010–11 Chris Barker
- 2011–12 Mark Phillips
- 2012–13 Sean Clohessy
- 2013–14 Ryan Leonard
- 2014–15 Dan Bentley
- 2015–16 Ryan Leonard
- 2016–17 Ryan Leonard
- 2017–18 Mark Oxley
- 2018–19 Simon Cox
- 2019–20 Elvis Bwomono
- 2020–21 Shaun Hobson
- 2021–22 Steve Arnold
- 2022–23 Cav Miley
- 2023–24 Gus Scott-Morriss
- 2024–25 Gus Scott-Morriss
- 2025-26 Gus Scott-Morriss

== Club officials ==
=== Executive ===
Position	Name
Chairman	(Australia) Justin Rees
Board of Directors	(Australia) Justin Rees
Board of Directors	(England) Jason Brown
Board of Directors	(England) David Kreyling
Board of Directors	(England) John Watson
Board of Directors	(United States) Shivaas Gulati

=== Football department ===
Position	Name
Head coach	(England) Kieron Dyer
Assistant Head Coach	(England) Adem Atay
First Team Coach	vacant
Head of Performance	(England) Elliot Turner
Head Goalkeeper Coach	(Finland) Anssi Jaakkola
Director of Football	(England) Oliver Gage
Head of Medical	vacant
Head of Recruitment	(England) Jonathan Duckett
First Team Analyst	(England) Tom Chilton
Kit Manager	(England) Ian Derrick

=== Managerial history ===
Sources:

- 1906–1910 Bob Jack
- 1910–1911 George Molyneux
- 1911–1912 O.M. Howard
- 1912–1919 Joe Bradshaw
- 1919–1920 Ned Liddle
- 1920–1921 Tom Mather
- 1921–1934 Ted Birnie
- 1934–1940 David Jack
- 1946–1956 Harry Warren
- 1956–1960 Eddie Perry
- 1960 Frank Broome
- 1961–1965 Ted Fenton
- 1965–1967 Alvan Williams
- 1967–1969 Ernie Shepherd
- 1969–1970 Geoff Hudson
- 1970–1976 Arthur Rowley
- 1976–1983 Dave Smith
- 1983–1984 Peter Morris
- 1984–1986 Bobby Moore
- 1986–1987 David Webb
- 1987 Dick Bate
- 1987–1988 Paul Clark
- 1988–1992 David Webb
- 1992–1993 Colin Murphy
- 1993 Barry Fry
- 1993–1995 Peter Taylor
- 1995 Steve Thompson
- 1995–1997 Ronnie Whelan
- 1997–1999 Alvin Martin
- 1999 Mick Gooding
- 1999–2000 Alan Little
- 2000 Mick Gooding
- 2000–2001 David Webb
- 2001–2003 Rob Newman
- 2003 Stewart Robson
- 2003 Steve Wignall
- 2003–2010 Steve Tilson
- 2010–2013 Paul Sturrock
- 2013–2018 Phil Brown
- 2018–2019 Chris Powell
- 2019 Kevin Bond
- 2019 Gary Waddock (interim)
- 2019–2020 Sol Campbell
- 2020–2021 Mark Molesley
- 2021 Phil Brown
- 2021–2026 Kevin Maher
- 2026– Kieron Dyer

== Club records ==
- Best FA Cup performance: Fifth round, 1920–21, 1925–26, 1951–52, 1975–76, 1992–93
- Best League Cup performance: Quarter-finals, 2006–07
- Best League Trophy performance: Final, 2003–04, 2004–05, 2012–13
- Best FA Trophy performance: Winners, 2025–26
- Largest victory: 10–1 vs. Golders Green, FA Cup, 24 November 1934; 10–1 vs. Brentwood, FA Cup, 7 December 1968; 10–1 vs. Aldershot, Football League Trophy, 6 November 1990
- Largest defeat: 9–1 vs. Brighton & Hove Albion, Third Division, 27 November 1965; 8–0 vs. Crystal Palace, League Cup second round, 25 September 1990
- Highest attendance: 31,033 vs. Liverpool, FA Cup, 10 January 1979
- Highest league attendance: 21,020 vs. Leyton Orient, Football League Third Division South, 9 September 1955
- Lowest attendance: 641 vs. Brighton and Hove Albion U23s, EFL Trophy, 1 October 2019
- Most points in a season (two points for a win): 67, 1980–81, Fourth Division
- Most points in a season (three points for a win): 85, 1990–91, Third Division
- Fewest points in a season: 19, 2019–20, EFL League One (season shortened due to COVID-19 pandemic)
- Most appearances in total: Alan Moody (506 – 1972–1984)
- Most league appearances: Sandy Anderson (452 – 1950–1963)
- Most goals in total: Roy Hollis (135 – 1954–1960)
- Consecutive league wins: 8 (29 August 2005 – 9 October 2005)

== Honours ==
League

- Third Division / League One (level 3)
  - Champions: 2005–06
  - Runners-up: 1990–91
- Fourth Division / League Two (level 4)
  - Champions: 1980–81
  - Runners-up: 1971–72, 1977–78
  - Promoted: 1986–87, 1989–90
  - Play-off winners: 2005, 2015
- Southern League Second Division
  - Champions: 1906–07, 1907–08
  - Runners-up: 1912–13

Cup

- Football League Trophy
  - Runners-up: 2003–04, 2004–05, 2012–13
- FA Trophy
  - Winners: 2025–26
- Essex Professional Cup
  - Winners: 1949–50, 1952–53, 1953–54, 1954–55, 1956–57, 1961–62, 1964–65, 1966–67, 1971–72, 1972–73
- Essex Senior Cup
  - Winners: 1982–83, 1990–91, 1996–97, 2007–08
- Essex Thameside Trophy
  - Winners: 1990
