= 2005 Football League Two play-off final =

Association football match

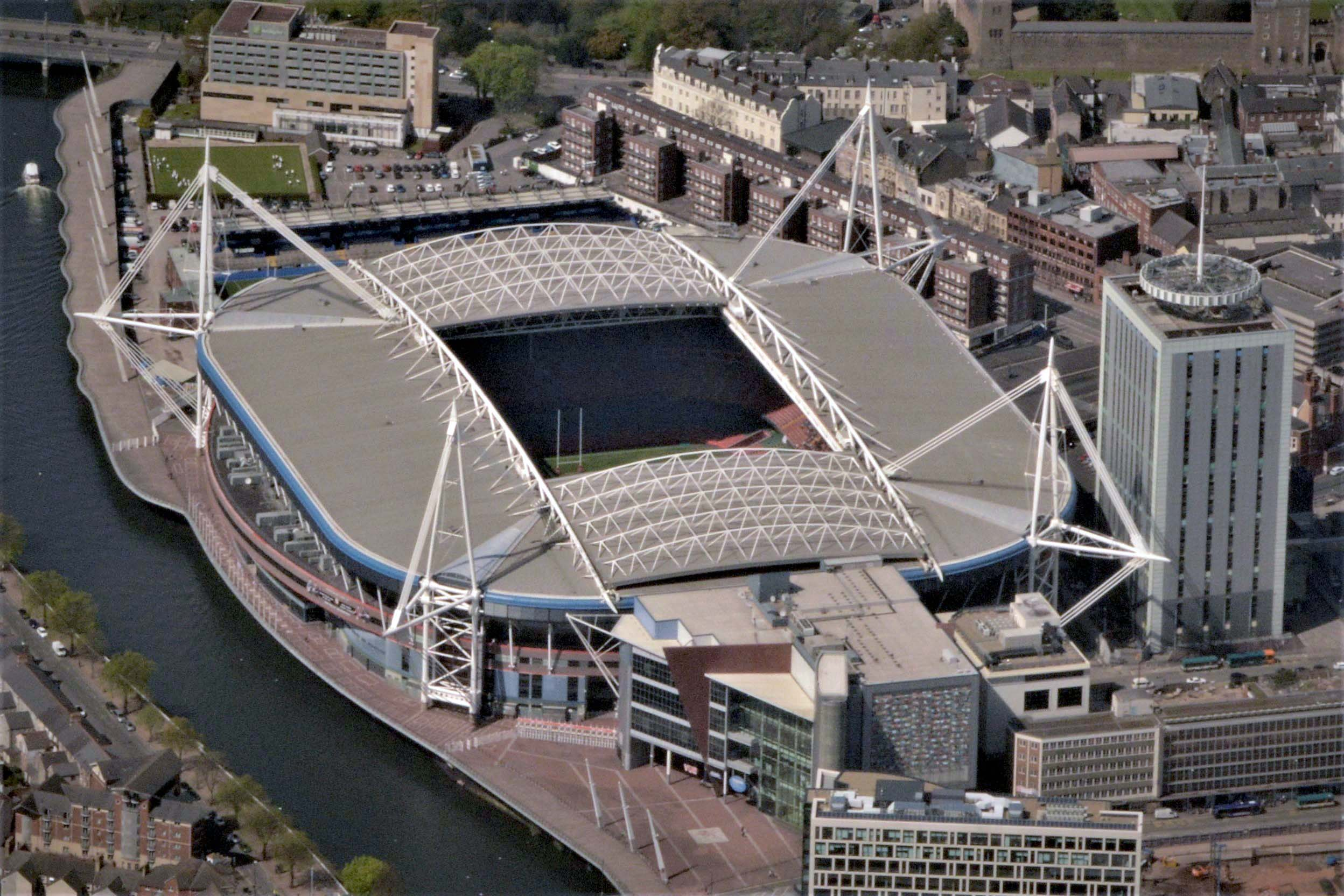
- The Millennium Stadium in Cardiff
Southend United	Lincoln City
2	0
- Date: 28 May 2005
- Venue: Millennium Stadium, Cardiff
- Referee: Martin Atkinson (Yorkshire)
- Attendance: 19,653

The 2005 Football League Two play-off final was an association football match played on 28 May 2005 at the Millennium Stadium, Cardiff, between Southend United and Lincoln City. The match determined the fourth and final team to gain promotion from Football League Two, English football's fourth tier, to Football League One. The top three teams of the 2004–05 Football League Two season gained automatic promotion to League One, while the teams placed from fourth to seventh in the table took part in play-off semi-finals; the winners of these semi-finals competed for the final place for the 2005–06 season in League One. Southend United finished in fourth place while Lincoln City ended the season in sixth position. They defeated Northampton Town and Macclesfield Town, respectively, in the semi-finals.

The match was refereed by Martin Atkinson in front of 19,653 spectators. The first 90 minutes finished goalless, and was described by Jamie Jackson in The Observer as "tepid, uninventive fare", so the game went into extra time. The first goal was scored just before half-time in the first period of extra time, when Spencer Prior flicked on Nicky Nicolau's corner and Freddy Eastwood struck Matt Bloomer's clearance into the Lincoln goal. With ten minutes of extra time remaining, Eastwood ran at the Lincoln defence and passed the ball square to Duncan Jupp who scored his first league goal in a decade to give Southend a 2–0 lead. No further goals were scored, securing Southend a 2–0 win and promotion to League One.

Lincoln City ended their following season in seventh position in League Two and qualified for the play-offs where they lost 3–1 on aggregate to Grimsby Town in the semi-final. Southend United secured back-to-back promotions when they finished the following season as champions of League One.

== Route to the final ==
Football League Two final table, leading positions
Pos	Team	Pld	W	D	L	GF	GA	GD	Pts
1	Yeovil Town	46	25	8	13	90	65	+25	83
2	Scunthorpe United	46	22	14	10	69	42	+27	80
3	Swansea City	46	24	8	14	62	43	+19	80
4	Southend United	46	22	12	12	65	46	+19	78
5	Macclesfield Town	46	22	9	15	60	49	+11	75
6	Lincoln City	46	20	12	14	64	47	+17	72
7	Northampton Town	46	20	12	14	62	51	+11	72

Southend United finished the regular 2004–05 season in fourth place in Football League Two, the fourth tier of the English football league system, two places ahead of Lincoln City. Both therefore missed out on the three automatic places for promotion to Football League One and instead took part in the play-offs to determine the fourth promoted team. Southend United finished two points behind Swansea City and Scunthorpe United (who were promoted in third and second place respectively, the latter having superior goal difference) and five behind league winners Yeovil Town. Lincoln City ended the season six points behind Southend United.

Lincoln City's opposition for their play-off semi-final was Macclesfield Town and the first match of the two-legged tie took place at Sincil Bank in Lincoln on 14 May 2005. Gareth McAuley scored in the 11th minute when he headed a free kick from Kevin Sandwith into the Macclesfield goal. Although Lincoln dominated the second half, they failed to increase their lead and the match ended 1–0. The second leg of the semi-final was held a week later at Moss Rose in Macclesfield. Once again, McAuley gave Lincoln an early lead, scoring with a header in the 15th minute. Paul Harsley equalised for Macclesfield in the 76th minute with a shot on the turn but the match ended 1–1 and Lincoln progressed to the final with a 2–1 aggregate victory.

Southend United faced Northampton Town in the second semi-final with the first leg hosted at Sixfields Stadium in Northampton on 15 May 2005. Both sides had chances to score and although the visitors were more dominant, the match ended 0–0. The second leg took place six days later at Roots Hall in Southend-on-Sea. The first half ended 0–0 but four minutes into the second, Nicky Nicolau was fouled in the Northampton penalty area and Freddy Eastwood converted the resulting penalty. It gave Southend a 1–0 victory both in the match and on aggregate, and they qualified for the final.

== Match ==
=== Background ===
It was Southend United's first appearance in the play-offs. They had played in the third tier of English football since they were relegated at the end of the 1997–98 season. This was their second visit to the Millennium Stadium of the season, having played in the Football League Trophy Final the month before where they lost 2–0 to Wrexham. Lincoln City were making their third consecutive appearance in the play-offs, having lost 5–2 against Bournemouth in the 2003 Football League Third Division play-off final and failing to progress past the semi-final in the 2004 play-offs. They had played in the third tier since being relegated in the 1998–99 season. Both matches between the sides during the regular season ended in 1–1 draws, first at Sincil Bank in August 2004, and again at Roots Hall the following March. Simon Yeo was Lincoln City's top scorer with 23 goals in the regular season (21 in the league, 2 in the League Cup) followed by Gary Taylor-Fletcher with 11 (10 in the league, 1 in the League Cup). Eastwood led the scoring for Southend United with 19 goals (all in the league) while both Adam Barrett and Wayne Gray had 11 (all in the league).

The referee for the match was Martin Atkinson from Yorkshire. Southend adopted a 4–4–2 formation and Lincoln played as a 3–4–3.

=== Summary ===
The match kicked off around 3 p.m. on 28 May 2005 at the Millennium Stadium in Cardiff in front of 19,653 spectators. The match was an even affair during the first half: early on, Francis Green's header for Lincoln was off-target, and the team then saw a goal from Yeo ruled out. Southend had two goal-bound chances cleared as the Lincoln goalkeeper Alan Marriott saved shots from both Carl Pettefer and Mark Bentley. Southend dominated the second half, with Eastwood creating the best chance in the 56th minute but falling over the ball with only Marriott to beat from around 8 yards (7.3 metres). Green then blocked a shot from Southend's Che Wilson before Bentley was denied a penalty after Paul Morgan appeared to foul him. Regular time ended goalless, sending the match into extra time. Jamie Jackson, writing in The Observer, described the first 90 minutes of the match as "tepid, uninventive fare". The first goal was scored just before half-time in the first period of extra time. Spencer Prior flicked on Nicolau's corner and Eastwood struck Matt Bloomer's clearance into the Lincoln goal to make it 1–0. With ten minutes of extra time remaining, Eastwood ran at the Lincoln defence and passed the ball square to Duncan Jupp who scored his first league goal in a decade to give Southend a 2–0 lead. With no further additions to the scoreline, the match ended 2–0 and Southend secured promotion to League One.

=== Details ===
28 May 2005
15:00 BST

Southend United	2–0	Lincoln City
Eastwood 105'; Jupp 110'

Millennium Stadium, Cardiff
Attendance: 19,653
Referee: Martin Atkinson (Yorkshire)

Southend United	Lincoln City

GK	13	Darryl Flahavan
RB	2	Duncan Jupp
CB	15	Spencer Prior
CB	6	Adam Barrett
LB	18	Che Wilson
RM	10	Carl Pettefer
CM	8	Kevin Maher (c)
CM	9	Mark Bentley	(yellow card) 29'
LM	3	Nicky Nicolau		(substituted off) 119'
FW	23	Freddy Eastwood		(substituted off) 118'
FW	14	Wayne Gray		(substituted off) 81'
Substitutes:
GK	1	Bart Griemink
DF	5	Andy Edwards		(substituted on) 118'
MF	7	Mark Gower		(substituted on) 119'
MF	29	Luke Guttridge
FW	11	Lawrie Dudfield		(substituted on) 81'
Manager:
Steve Tilson

GK	1	Alan Marriott
WB	17	Gareth McAuley
CB	23	Jamie McCombe
CB	5	Paul Morgan (c)
CB	4	Ben Futcher	(yellow card) 120'
WB	3	Kevin Sandwith
CM	8	Richard Butcher
CM	11	Peter Gain
FW	27	Gary Taylor-Fletcher		(substituted off) 94'
FW	9	Simon Yeo		(substituted off) 90'
FW	30	Francis Green		(substituted off) 105'
Substitutes:
GK	13	Simon Rayner
DF	2	Lee Beevers		(substituted on) 105'
DF	14	Matt Bloomer		(substituted on) 94'
MF	16	Ritchie Hanlon
FW	7	Derek Asamoah		(substituted on) 90'
Manager:
Keith Alexander

== Post-match ==
Steve Tilson, the winning manager, praised his side's resilience: "After not getting automatic promotion, to bounce back and win today was a great achievement ... I thought we were worthy winners in the end." His counterpart Keith Alexander suggested that his team needed to be improved: "We have to go out and get a better team ... I've got to get better players and we have to go up from the top three."

Lincoln City ended their following season in seventh position in League Two and qualified for the play-offs where they lost 3–1 on aggregate to Grimsby Town in the semi-final. Southend United finished the following season as champions of League One, securing back-to-back promotions, to participate in the Championship for the 2006–07 season.
