= 2007–08 Southend United F.C. season =

Southend United
2007–08 season
- Manager: Steve Tilson
- Stadium: Roots Hall
- League One: 6th Playoffs
- FA Cup: Fourth round
- Football League Cup: Third round
- Johnstones Paint Trophy: Southern first round
- Playoffs: Semi Final

This page shows the progress of Southend United F.C. in the 2007–08 football season. During the season, Southend United competed in League One in the English league system.

== League table ==
Pos	Team	Pld	W	D	L	GF	GA	GD	Pts	Promotion, qualification or relegation
4	Carlisle United	46	23	11	12	64	46	+18	80	Qualification for League One play-offs (Note: Four teams play for one spot and promotion to the Football League Championship.)
5	Leeds United	46	27	10	9	72	38	+34	76 (Note: Leeds deducted 15 points for failure to comply with rules on insolvency.)	Qualification for League One play-offs
6	Southend United	46	22	10	14	70	55	+15	76	Qualification for League One play-offs
7	Brighton & Hove Albion	46	19	12	15	58	50	+8	69	
8	Oldham Athletic	46	18	13	15	58	45	+13	67	

Updated to match(es) played on 3 May 2008. Source: The Football League
Rules for classification: 1) points; 2) goal difference; 3) number of goals scored.

== Results ==
=== Football League One ===
11 August 2007 1	Southend United	1–2	Leyton Orient	Southend-on-sea
	Gower 24'; McCormack (red card) 57'		Thornton 38'; Boyd 86'	Stadium: Roots Hall; Attendance: 9,828

18 August 2007 2	Leeds United	4–1	Southend United	Leeds
	Thompson 3'; Flo 85'; Marques 88'; Beckford 90'		Barrett 69'	Stadium: Elland Road; Attendance: 24,036

25 August 2007 3	Southend United	1–0	Millwall	Southend-on-sea
	Bailey 55'			Stadium: Roots Hall; Attendance: 8,758

1 September 2007 4	Brighton & Hove Albion	3–2	Southend United	Brighton
	Forster 75', 85'; Hammond 90'		McCormack 40'; Bailey 78'	Stadium: Withdean Stadium; Attendance: 5,652

8 September 2007 5	Southend United	3–0	Gillingham	Southend-on-sea
	Bailey 8'; McCormack 44'; L. Clarke 59'			Stadium: Roots Hall; Attendance: 7,348

15 September 2007 6	Oldham Athletic	0–1	Southend United	Oldham
			L. Clarke 28'	Stadium: Boundary Park; Attendance: 5,151

22 September 2007 7	Southend United	3–2	Doncaster Rovers	Southend-on-sea
	Barrett 25'; McCormack 49'; L. Clarke 59' (pen.)		Roberts 28'; Guy 36'	Stadium: Roots Hall; Attendance: 8,117

29 September 2007 8	Port Vale	1–2	Southend United	Stoke on Trent
	Rodgers 59' (pen.)		L. Clarke 32'; McCormack 45'	Stadium: Vale Park; Attendance: 3,969

2 October 2007 9	Bristol Rovers	1–1	Southend United	Bristol
	Walker 11' (pen.)		L. Clarke 90'	Stadium: Memorial Stadium; Attendance: 5,762

6 October 2007 10	Southend United	1–2	Tranmere Rovers	Southend-on-sea
	Barrett 43'		Chorley 30'; Taylor 55'	Stadium: Roots Hall; Attendance: 7,619

13 October 2007 11	Southend United	3–0	Crewe Alexandra	Southend-on-sea
	Bailey 17'; Hooper 63'; L. Clarke 82' (pen.)			Stadium: Roots Hall; Attendance: 6,927

20 October 2007 12	Walsall	0–2	Southend United	Walsall
			P. Clarke 38'; L. Clarke 51'	Stadium: Banks's Stadium; Attendance: 5,661

27 October 2007 13	Southend United	0–1	Carlisle United	Southend-on-sea
			Garner 59'	Stadium: Roots Hall; Attendance: 9,281

3 November 2007 14	Northampton Town	0–1	Southend United	Northampton
			Barrett 65'	Stadium: Sixfields; Attendance: 6,646

6 November 2007 15	Nottingham Forest	4–1	Southend United	Nottingham
	Breckin 41'; Tyson 65'; Agogo 73', 88'		Gower 3'; L. Clarke (red card) 67'	Stadium: City Ground; Attendance: 26,094

17 November 2007 16	Southend United	2–2	Cheltenham Town	Southend-on-sea
	Gower 50'; Hammell 56'		Gillespie 14'; Sinclair 25'	Stadium: Roots Hall; Attendance: 7,158

24 November 2007 17	Luton Town	1–0	Southend United	Luton
	Andrew 74'			Stadium: Kenilworth Road; Attendance: 6,820

5 December 2007 18	Southend United	4–1	Huddersfield Town	Southend-on-sea
	Bailey 3'; McCormack 57', 90'; Gower 84'		Sinclair 67' (red card) 90'; Glennon (red card) 75'	Stadium: Roots Hall; Attendance: 6,844

8 December 2007 19	Southend United	2–1	Swindon Town	Southend-on-sea
	Barrett 32'; Gower 90'		Cox 2'	Stadium: Roots Hall; Attendance: 7,403

15 December 2007 20	Swansea City	3–0	Southend United	Swansea
	Feeney 18'; Rangel 58'; Butler 83'		Bailey (red card) 35'	Stadium: Liberty Stadium; Attendance: 12,629

22 December 2007 21	Southend United	0–1	Oldham Athletic	Southend-on-sea
	McCormack (red card) 73'		Hughes 4'	Stadium: Roots Hall; Attendance: 7,388

26 December 2007 22	Gillingham	1–1	Southend United	Gillingham
	Miller 89'; Thurgood (red card) 90'		P. Clarke 54'	Stadium: Priestfield; Attendance: 8,268

29 December 2007 23	Doncaster Rovers	3–1	Southend United	Doncaster
	Lockwood 8'; Green 30'; Roberts 42'		MacDonald 18'	Stadium: Keepmoat Stadium; Attendance: 7,163

1 January 2008 24	Southend United	0–1	Bristol Rovers	Southend-on-sea
			Williams 57'	Stadium: Roots Hall; Attendance: 7,664

12 January 2008 25	Southend United	1–1	Yeovil Town	Southend-on-sea
	Bailey 20'; Harrold (red card) 86'		Owusu 71'	Stadium: Roots Hall; Attendance: 7,352

19 January 2008 26	Bournemouth	1–4	Southend United	Bournemouth
	Cummings 50'		Gower 18'; Francis 23'; Black 44'; Hooper 65'	Stadium: Fitness First Stadium; Attendance: 5,419

26 January 2008 27	Hartlepool United	4–3	Southend United	Hartlepool
	Barker 17' (pen.); Brown 47', 53'; Sweeney 90'		Hammell 30' (pen.); Gower 83'; Black 90'	Stadium: Victoria Park; Attendance: 3,217

29 January 2008 28	Southend United	1–0	Leeds United	Southend-on-sea
	Barnard 41'			Stadium: Roots Hall; Attendance: 9,819

2 February 2008 29	Leyton Orient	2–2	Southend United	London
	Boyd 51' (pen.); Ibehre 90'		Barnard 27'; P. Clarke 56'	Stadium: Matchroom Stadium; Attendance: 6,886

9 February 2008 30	Southend United	2–1	Hartlepool United	Southend-on-sea
	McCormack 61'; Bailey 66'		Sweeney 9'; Collins (red card) 64'	Stadium: Roots Hall; Attendance: 7,436

12 February 2008 31	Millwall	2–1	Southend United	London
	Alexander 41'; Martin 54'		Bailey 9'; Scannell (red card) 79'	Stadium: The Den; Attendance: 7,425

16 February 2008 32	Southend United	2–1	Bournemouth	Southend-on-sea
	Barnard 10'; Walker 79'		Pearce 40'	Stadium: Roots Hall; Attendance: 7,474

23 February 2008 33	Yeovil Town	0–3	Southend United	Yeovil
			Barnard 20'; P. Clarke 34'; Gower 64'	Stadium: Huish Park; Attendance: 4,820

29 February 2008 34	Cheltenham Town	1–1	Southend United	Cheltenham
	Brooker 25'		Bailey 74'	Stadium: Whaddon Road; Attendance: 3,859

8 March 2008 35	Southend United	2–0	Luton Town	Southend-on-sea
	Bailey 37'; Walker 90'			Stadium: Roots Hall; Attendance: 8,241

11 March 2008 36	Southend United	1–1	Nottingham Forest	Southend-on-sea
	Robson-Kanu 20'		Thornhill 65'	Stadium: Roots Hall; Attendance: 8,376

15 March 2008 37	Huddersfield Town	1–2	Southend United	Huddersfield
	Booth 73'		Robson-Kanu 40'; McCormack 90'	Stadium: Galpharm Stadium; Attendance: 7,823

21 March 2008 38	Southend United	1–1	Swansea City	Southend-on-sea
	Robson-Kanu 45'		Scotland 24' (pen.)	Stadium: Roots Hall; Attendance: 9,797

24 March 2008 39	Swindon Town	0–1	Southend United	Swindon
			Francis 18'	Stadium: County Ground; Attendance: 6,378

29 March 2008 40	Southend United	1–0	Walsall	Southend-on-sea
	Barnard 47'			Stadium: Roots Hall; Attendance: 8,145

5 April 2008 41	Crewe Alexandra	1–3	Southend United	Crewe
	Maynard 74'		Barnard 2', 80'; Walker 19'	Stadium: Gresty Road; Attendance: 4,895

8 April 2008 42	Southend United	2–0	Brighton & Hove Albion	Southend-on-sea
	Gower 24'; Barrett 30'			Stadium: Roots Hall; Attendance: 8,428

12 April 2008 43	Southend United	1–1	Northampton Town	Southend-on-sea
	Barnard 51'		Larkin 24'	Stadium: Roots Hall; Attendance: 9,286

19 April 2008 44	Carlisle United	1–2	Southend United	Carlisle
	Hackney 52'; Raven (red card) 67'		Mulgrew 7'; Barnard 90'	Stadium: Brunton Park; Attendance: 9,122

26 April 2008 45	Tranmere Rovers	1–0	Southend United	Birkenhead
	Kay 53'			Stadium: Prenton Park; Attendance: 5,842

3 May 2008 46	Southend United	1–1	Port Vale	Southend-on-sea
	Walker 84'		Mulligan 23'	Stadium: Roots Hall; Attendance: 9,292

=== FA Cup ===
10 November 2007 Round 1	Southend United	2–1	Rochdale	Southend-on-sea
	Bailey 1'; Harrold 24' (pen.)		Le Fondre 12'	Stadium: Roots Hall; Attendance: 5,180

1 December 2007 Round 2	Oxford United	0–0	Southend United	Oxford
				Stadium: Kassam Stadium; Attendance: 5,162

11 December 2007 Round 2 replay	Southend United	3–0	Oxford United	Southend-on-sea
	MacDonald 5', 90'; Morgan 45' (pen.)			Stadium: Roots Hall; Attendance: 2,740

5 January 2008 Round 3	Southend United	5–2	Dagenham & Redbridge	Southend-on-sea
	MacDonald 11'; Morgan 64', 90'; Francis 77'; Bailey 89'		Nurse 32'; Strevens 58'	Stadium: Roots Hall; Attendance: 6,393

23 January 2008 Round 4	Southend United	0–1	Barnsley	Southend-on-sea
			Campbell-Ryce 22'	Stadium: Roots Hall; Attendance: 7,212

=== League Cup ===
14 August 2007 Round 1	Southend United	4–1 (a.e.t.)	Cheltenham Town	Southend-on-sea
	Bradbury 11', 108' (pen.), 117'; Barrett 104'		Finnigan 70'	Stadium: Roots Hall; Attendance: 3,084

28 August 2007 Round 2	Southend United	2–0	Watford	Southend-on-sea
	MacDonald 20'; Harrold 55'			Stadium: Roots Hall; Attendance: 5,554

25 September 2007 Round 3	Blackpool	2–1 (a.e.t.)	Southend United	Blackpool
	Hoolahan 81'; Jackson 118'		Harrold 7' (pen.)	Stadium: Bloomfield Road; Attendance: 5,022

=== Football League Trophy ===
4 September 2007 Southern Section Round 1	Southend United	2–2 (6–7 p)	Dagenham & Redbridge	Southend-on-sea
	Foran 20'; MacDonald 60'		Saunders 48'; Moore 85'	Stadium: Roots Hall; Attendance: 5,215

=== League One Playoffs ===
9 May 2008 Semi Final Leg 1	Southend United	0–0	Doncaster Rovers	Southend-on-sea
			Heffernan (red card) 87'	Stadium: Roots Hall; Attendance: 9,109

16 May 2008 Semi Final Leg 2	Doncaster Rovers	5–1 (5–1 agg.)	Southend United	Doncaster
	Stock 11' (pen.); Barrett 21' (o.g.); Coppinger 39', 52', 80'		Bailey 88'	Stadium: Keepmoat Stadium; Attendance: 13,081

== Players ==
=== First-team squad ===
Includes all players who were awarded squad numbers during the season.

Note: Flags indicate national team as defined under FIFA eligibility rules; some limited exceptions apply. Players may hold more than one non-FIFA nationality.

No.	Pos.	Nation	Player
1	GK	ENG	Darryl Flahavan
2	DF	ENG	Simon Francis
3	DF	ENG	Che Wilson
4	MF	ENG	Lewis Hunt
5	DF	ENG	Peter Clarke
6	DF	ENG	Adam Barrett
7	MF	ENG	Mark Gower
8	MF	ENG	Kevin Maher
9	FW	IRL	Richie Foran
10	FW	ENG	Charlie MacDonald
11	FW	ENG	Alex Revell
12	MF	ENG	Damian Scannell
13	GK	ENG	Steve Collis
14	FW	WAL	Hal Robson-Kanu (on loan from Reading)
15	DF	HUN	Zoltán Lipták

No.	Pos.	Nation	Player
16	MF	IRL	Alan McCormack
17	MF	ENG	Tommy Black
18	DF	SCO	Charlie Mulgrew (on loan from Wolverhampton Wanderers)
19	FW	ENG	Lee Barnard
20	FW	ENG	Matt Harrold
21	FW	ENG	Gary Hooper
22	MF	BEL	Franck Moussa
23	MF	ENG	Nicky Bailey
24	FW	ENG	Charles Ademeno
25	MF	ENG	Anthony Grant (on loan from Chelsea)
26	DF	ENG	Johnny Herd
28	FW	ENG	James Walker
30	MF	COD	Peggy Lokando

=== Left club during season ===
Note: Flags indicate national team as defined under FIFA eligibility rules; some limited exceptions apply. Players may hold more than one non-FIFA nationality.

No.	Pos.	Nation	Player
12	FW	ENG	Lee Bradbury (joined Bournemouth on 31 August 2007)
11	MF	JAM	Jamal Campbell-Ryce (joined Barnsley on 31 August 2007)
19	FW	ENG	Billy Paynter (joined Swindon Town on 31 August 2007)
28	FW	ENG	Leon Clarke (returned to parent club Sheffield Wednesday following loan spell)
29	FW	ENG	Eric Odhiambo (returned to parent club Leicester City following loan spell)

No.	Pos.	Nation	Player
25	DF	ENG	Kerrea Gilbert (returned to parent club Arsenal following loan spell)
11	FW	ENG	Dean Morgan (returned to parent club Luton Town following loan spell)
14	DF	ENG	Garry Richards (joined Gillingham on 25 January 2008)
18	MF	SCO	Steven Hammell (joined Motherwell in January 2008)

== Transfers ==
=== In ===
Date	Nation	Position	Name	Club From	Transfer Fee
9 June 2007	(England)	FW	Charlie MacDonald	Ebbsfleet United	Free
24 July 2007	(Hungary)	DF	Zoltán Lipták	Lombard-Pápa TFC	£50.000
4 August 2007	(England)	DF	Garry Richards	Colchester United	Undisclosed
1 January 2008	(England)	MF	Damian Scannell	Eastleigh	£5,000
25 January 2008	(England)	FW	Lee Barnard	Tottenham Hotspur	Undisclosed
30 January 2008	(England)	FW	Alex Revell	Brighton & Hove Albion	£150,000

=== Out ===
Date	Nation	Position	Name	Club To	Transfer Fee
6 July 2007	(England)	FW	Freddy Eastwood	Wolverhampton Wanderers	£1,500,000
10 July 2007	(Nigeria)	DF	Efe Sodje	Gillingham	Free
2 August 2007	(England)	FW	James Lawson	Grays Athletic	Free
31 August 2007	(England)	FW	Lee Bradbury	AFC Bournemouth	Undisclosed
31 August 2007	(Jamaica)	MF	Jamal Campbell-Ryce	Barnsley	Undisclosed
31 August 2007	(England)	FW	Billy Paynter	Swindon Town	Undisclosed
31 January 2008	(Scotland)	DF	Steven Hammell	Motherwell	£110,000
31 January 2008	(England)	DF	Garry Richards	Gillingham	Undisclosed

=== Loans in ===
Date	Nation	Position	Name	Club From	Length
31 August 2007	(England)	FW	Leon Clarke	Sheffield Wednesday	Until January
31 August 2007	(England)	FW	Eric Odhiambo	Leicester City	One Month
30 January 2008	(Wales)	FW	Hal Robson-Kanu	Reading	Until end of season
31 January 2008	(England)	MF	Anthony Grant	Chelsea	Until end of season
31 January 2008	(Scotland)	DF	Charlie Mulgrew	Wolverhampton Wanderers	Until end of season

=== Loans out ===
Date	Nation	Position	Name	Club To	Length
25 August 2007	(England)	FW	Lee Bradbury	AFC Bournemouth	Until 31 August
