= 2005–06 Southend United F.C. season =

Southend United
2005–06 season
- Chairman: Ron Martin
- Manager: Steve Tilson
- Stadium: Roots Hall
- League One: 1st (champions)
- FA Cup: Second round
- League Cup: First round
- LDV Vans Trophy: First round
- Top goalscorer: League: Eastwood (23); All: Eastwood (25)
- Average home league attendance: 8,053

During the 2005–06 English football season, Southend United F.C. competed in the Football League One.

== Season summary ==
In the 2005–06 season, Southend had another successful campaign and on 29 April 2006, the Shrimpers were promoted to the Football League Championship after a 2–2 draw with Swansea City at the Welsh club's new Liberty Stadium. Southend was crowned League One champions on 6 May 2006 after beating Bristol City 1–0 at Roots Hall in front of over 11,000 fans. This was the last professional appearance of Shaun Goater; fans from his former club Manchester City came to give him a special send-off at the end of a long and distinguished career. For Southend United, the title was the club's first in 25 years. On 6 May 2006, Tilson was named as the League Manager Association's Manager-of-the-Season for League One.

== Final league table ==
Pos	Team	Pld	W	D	L	GF	GA	GD	Pts	Qualification or relegation
1	Southend United (C, P)	46	23	13	10	72	43	+29	82	Promotion to the Championship
2	Colchester United (P)	46	22	13	11	58	40	+18	79	Promotion to the Championship
3	Brentford	46	20	16	10	72	52	+20	76	Qualification for the League One play-offs
4	Huddersfield Town	46	19	16	11	72	59	+13	73	Qualification for the League One play-offs
5	Barnsley (O, P)	46	18	18	10	62	44	+18	72	Qualification for the League One play-offs

Rules for classification: 1) Points; 2) Goal difference; 3) Goals scored
(C) Champions; (O) Play-off winners; (P) Promoted

== Results ==
Southend United's score comes first

=== Legend ===
Win	Draw	Loss

=== Football League One ===
Date	Opponent	Venue	Result	Attendance	Scorers
6 August 2005	Port Vale	H	1–2	6,543	Gray
9 August 2005	Bradford City	A	2–0	8,250	Wetherall (own goal), Guttridge
13 August 2005	Walsall	A	2–2	5,563	Gray, Goater
20 August 2005	Huddersfield Town	H	1–1	5,567	Eastwood
26 August 2005	Scunthorpe United	A	0–1	5,569	
29 August 2005	Colchester United	H	3–1	7,344	Goater (2), Cole
4 September 2005	Oldham Athletic	H	2–1	5,261	Lawson, Gower
10 September 2005	Swindon Town	A	2–1	4,785	Barrett, Gray
17 September 2005	Tranmere Rovers	H	3–1	6,691	Lawson, Goater (2, 1 pen)
24 September 2005	Rotherham United	A	4–2	4,259	Bentley, Barrett, Gray (2, 1 pen)
27 September 2005	Yeovil Town	H	4–1	6,694	Guttridge, Gray, Eastwood (2)
1 October 2005	Gillingham	A	2–1	8,128	Bentley (2)
9 October 2005	Nottingham Forest	H	1–0	10,104	Eastwood
15 October 2005	Doncaster Rovers	A	0–2	5,899	
22 October 2005	Barnsley	H	1–1	6,986	Goater (pen)
29 October 2005	Bristol City	A	3–0	10,625	Eastwood (3)
12 November 2005	Swansea City	H	1–2	11,049	Eastwood
19 November 2005	Nottingham Forest	A	0–2	19,576	
26 November 2005	Port Vale	A	1–2	3,961	Smith
6 December 2005	Chesterfield	H	0–0	5,767	
10 December 2005	Bradford City	H	1–1	7,307	Gower
17 December 2005	Huddersfield Town	A	0–0	11,223	
26 December 2005	Milton Keynes Dons	H	0–0	7,452	
28 December 2005	Hartlepool United	A	2–1	3,929	Eastwood, Gray (pen)
31 December 2005	Bournemouth	H	2–1	6,357	Gray (pen), Guttridge
2 January 2006	Blackpool	A	2–1	5,271	Bentley, Eastwood
7 January 2006	Oldham Athletic	A	0–0	5,662	
14 January 2006	Brentford	H	4–1	10,046	Sodje, Gower, Barrett, Wilson
21 January 2006	Tranmere Rovers	A	0–0	7,058	
27 January 2006	Swindon Town	H	2–0	7,945	Guttridge, Gower
4 February 2006	Yeovil Town	A	2–0	6,289	Bentley, Goater
10 February 2006	Rotherham United	H	2–0	7,879	Goater, Eastwood
14 February 2006	Brentford	A	0–2	7,022	
18 February 2006	Chesterfield	A	4–3	4,527	Eastwood (3, 1 pen), Goater
25 February 2006	Walsall	H	0–0	7,906	
4 March 2006	Colchester United	A	3–0	7,765	Eastwood, Maher, Wilson
10 March 2006	Scunthorpe United	H	3–0	8,717	Eastwood, Bradbury, Goater
18 March 2006	Milton Keynes Dons	A	1–2	7,071	Goater
25 March 2006	Hartlepool United	H	3–0	8,496	Gower, Eastwood (2)
1 April 2006	Bournemouth	A	1–1	7,638	Eastwood
8 April 2006	Blackpool	H	2–1	8,180	Eastwood, Guttridge
14 April 2006	Gillingham	H	0–1	11,195	
17 April 2006	Barnsley	A	2–2	10,663	Gower, Eastwood
22 April 2006	Doncaster Rovers	H	0–1	10,397	
29 April 2006	Swansea City	A	2–2	19,176	Eastwood (2)
6 May 2006	Bristol City	H	1–0	11,387	Gray

=== FA Cup ===
Round	Date	Opponent	Venue	Result	Attendance	Goalscorers
R1	5 November 2005	Barnet	A	1–0	3,545	Eastwood
R2	3 December 2005	Milton Keynes Dons	H	1–2	5,267	Eastwood

=== League Cup ===
Round	Date	Opponent	Venue	Result	Attendance	Goalscorers
R1	22 August 2005	Southampton	H	0–3	6,358	

=== LDV Vans Trophy ===
Round	Date	Opponent	Venue	Result	Attendance	Goalscorers
R1S	18 October 2005	Rushden & Diamonds	A	0–1	1,300	

== Squad ==
Note: Flags indicate national team as defined under FIFA eligibility rules; some limited exceptions apply. Players may hold more than one non-FIFA nationality.

No.	Pos.	Nation	Player
1	GK	ENG	Darryl Flahavan
2	DF	ENG	Duncan Jupp
3	DF	ENG	Che Wilson
4	MF	ENG	Lewis Hunt
5	DF	ENG	Spencer Prior
6	DF	ENG	Adam Barrett
7	MF	ENG	Mark Gower
8	MF	IRL	Kevin Maher
9	FW	BER	Shaun Goater
10	FW	ENG	Wayne Gray
11	MF	ENG	Carl Pettefer
12	MF	ENG	Mark Bentley
13	GK	NED	Bart Griemink

No.	Pos.	Nation	Player
14	MF	ENG	Mitchell Cole
15	DF	ENG	Andy Edwards
16	MF	ENG	Luke Guttridge
17	MF	ENG	Jay Smith
18	FW	ENG	Charles Ademeno
19	FW	ENG	Lee Bradbury
20	FW	ENG	James Lawson
22	DF	NGA	Efe Sodje
23	FW	WAL	Freddy Eastwood
24	DF	ENG	Mark Wright
25	DF	IRL	Gerard Nash (on loan from Ipswich Town)
26	MF	BEL	Franck Moussa
33	GK	ENG	Matthew Driver

=== Left club during season ===
Note: Flags indicate national team as defined under FIFA eligibility rules; some limited exceptions apply. Players may hold more than one non-FIFA nationality.

No.	Pos.	Nation	Player
21	MF	JAM	Jamal Campbell-Ryce (on loan from Rotherham United)
