= 2006–07 Southend United F.C. season =

Southend United
2006–07 season
- Chairman: Ron Martin
- Manager: Steve Tilson
- Stadium: Roots Hall
- Championship: 22nd (relegated)
- FA Cup: Fourth round
- League Cup: Quarter-finals
- Top goalscorer: League: Eastwood (11); All: Eastwood (16)
- Average home league attendance: 10,024

During the 2006–07 English football season, Southend United F.C. competed in the Football League Championship.

== Season summary ==
Southend United started the season reasonably well, beating Stoke City 1–0 on the opening day and defeating Sunderland 3–1 at Roots Hall several games later. After that, Southend did not win a league game for 18 games until 9 December when they beat Southampton 2–1. Southend followed this with a convincing 3–1 win over promotion-chasing West Bromwich Albion; on New Year's Day, in defeating Cardiff City 1–0 thanks to Lee Bradbury's 30-yard volley, Southend picked up their first away victory of the season and stretched their unbeaten run to five games. A 3–1 victory away to Birmingham City on 31 January saw the Shrimpers lift themselves from the bottom of the Championship, moving above Leeds United on goal difference. Southend finally pulled themselves out of the relegation zone on 13 March when Richie Foran came off the bench to score his first Southend United goal in the sixth minute of injury time, giving the Shrimpers a 1–0 victory over Burnley.

Regrettably, the form did not last and, after a humiliating 3–0 home defeat to local rivals Colchester United, the Shrimpers were relegated back to League One.

Southend pulled one of the shocks of the season when they defeated eventual champions and reigning cup holders Manchester United (whose starting lineup featured the likes of Cristiano Ronaldo and Wayne Rooney) 1–0 at Roots Hall in the League Cup, Freddy Eastwood netting after 27 minutes to send the Shrimpers through to the quarter-finals, against Tottenham Hotspur at White Hart Lane. Southend defended bravely against Spurs, taking the London club to extra time before Jermain Defoe scored the only goal of the game with five minutes of extra time left, although replays later proved he was offside.

Top scorer Freddy Eastwood was to Wolverhampton Wanderers for £1.5 million in the close season, in a move that struck a huge blow to Southend's hopes of an automatic return to the second tier.

== Final league table ==
Pos	Team	Pld	W	D	L	GF	GA	GD	Pts	Promotion, qualification or relegation
20	Barnsley	46	15	5	26	53	85	−32	50	
21	Hull City	46	13	10	23	51	67	−16	49	
22	Southend United (R)	46	10	12	24	47	80	−33	42	Relegation to Football League One
23	Luton Town (R)	46	10	10	26	53	81	−28	40	Relegation to Football League One
24	Leeds United (R)	46	13	7	26	46	72	−26	36 (Note: Leeds United had 10 points deducted for entering financial administration.)	Relegation to Football League One

Source: RSSSF
Rules for classification: In the Football League goals scored (F) takes precedence over goal difference (GD).
(R) Relegated

== Results ==
Southend United's score comes first

=== Legend ===
Win	Draw	Loss

=== Football League Championship ===
Date	Opponent	Venue	Result	Attendance	Scorers
5 August 2006	Stoke City	H	1–0	8,971	Eastwood (pen)
8 August 2006	Crystal Palace	A	1–3	18,072	Eastwood
12 August 2006	Queens Park Rangers	A	0–2	12,368	
19 August 2006	Sunderland	H	3–1	9,848	Barrett (2), Bradbury
26 August 2006	Leicester City	A	0–1	19,427	
9 September 2006	Sheffield Wednesday	H	0–0	9,639	
12 September 2006	Norwich City	H	3–3	11,072	Eastwood, Hammell, Gower
16 September 2006	West Bromwich Albion	A	1–1	19,576	Harrold
24 September 2006	Cardiff City	H	0–3	7,901	
30 September 2006	Derby County	A	0–3	22,395	
13 October 2006	Coventry City	H	2–3	9,821	Eastwood (2, 1 pen)
17 October 2006	Burnley	A	0–0	10,461	
21 October 2006	Ipswich Town	H	1–3	11,415	Francis
28 October 2006	Leeds United	A	0–2	19,528	
31 October 2006	Hull City	H	2–3	10,234	Harrold, Eastwood
4 November 2006	Wolverhampton Wanderers	A	1–3	17,904	Harrold
11 November 2006	Preston North End	H	0–0	9,263	
18 November 2006	Plymouth Argyle	H	1–1	9,469	Gower
25 November 2006	Colchester United	A	0–3	5,954	
28 November 2006	Barnsley	A	0–2	9,588	
2 December 2006	Wolverhampton Wanderers	H	0–1	9,411	
9 December 2006	Southampton	H	2–1	10,867	Eastwood, McCormack
15 December 2006	Luton Town	A	0–0	7,468	
23 December 2006	Birmingham City	H	0–4	9,781	
26 December 2006	Norwich City	A	0–0	25,433	
30 December 2006	Coventry City	A	1–1	16,623	Gower
1 January 2007	West Bromwich Albion	H	3–1	9,907	Campbell-Ryce (2), Hunt
13 January 2007	Cardiff City	A	1–0	13,822	Bradbury
20 January 2007	Derby County	H	0–1	10,745	
30 January 2007	Birmingham City	A	3–1	19,177	Maher, Eastwood, Gower
3 February 2007	Stoke City	A	1–1	23,017	Eastwood
9 February 2007	Queens Park Rangers	H	5–0	10,217	Bradbury, Gower, Sodje, Maher (2)
17 February 2007	Sunderland	A	0–4	33,576	
20 February 2007	Crystal Palace	H	0–1	10,419	
24 February 2007	Sheffield Wednesday	A	2–3	24,116	Hunt, Eastwood
3 March 2007	Leicester City	H	2–2	10,528	Eastwood, McCormack
10 March 2007	Ipswich Town	A	2–0	24,051	Gower, Clarke
13 March 2007	Burnley	H	1–0	8,855	Foran
17 March 2007	Leeds United	H	1–1	11,274	Gower
31 March 2007	Hull City	A	0–4	19,629	
6 April 2007	Colchester United	H	0–3	10,552	
9 April 2007	Preston North End	A	3–2	13,684	Maher (2), McCormack
14 April 2007	Barnsley	H	1–3	10,089	Gower
21 April 2007	Plymouth Argyle	A	1–2	11,097	Clarke
28 April 2007	Luton Town	H	1–3	10,276	Bradbury
6 May 2007	Southampton	A	1–4	32,008	Barrett

=== FA Cup ===
Round	Date	Opponent	Venue	Result	Attendance	Goalscorers
R3	6 January 2007	Barnsley	H	1–1	5,485	Gower
R3R	16 January 2007	Barnsley	A	2–0	4,944	Maher, Bradbury
R4	27 January 2007	Tottenham Hotspur	A	1–3	33,406	Eastwood (pen)

=== League Cup ===
Round	Date	Opponent	Venue	Result	Attendance	Goalscorers
R1	22 August 2006	Bournemouth	A	3–1	3,764	Gower, Eastwood (2, 1 pen)
R2	19 September 2006	Brighton & Hove Albion	H	3–2	4,819	Paynter, Hunt, Eastwood
R3	24 October 2006	Leeds United	A	3–1	10,449	Hammell (pen), Hooper (2)
R4	7 November 2006	Manchester United	H	1–0	11,532	Eastwood
R5	20 December 2006	Tottenham Hotspur	A	0–1(a.e.t.)	35,811	

== Squad ==
Note: Flags indicate national team as defined under FIFA eligibility rules; some limited exceptions apply. Players may hold more than one non-FIFA nationality.

No.	Pos.	Nation	Player
1	GK	ENG	Darryl Flahavan
2	DF	ENG	Simon Francis
3	DF	ENG	Che Wilson
4	MF	ENG	Lewis Hunt
5	DF	ENG	Spencer Prior
6	DF	ENG	Adam Barrett
7	MF	ENG	Mark Gower
8	MF	ENG	Kevin Maher
9	FW	IRL	Richie Foran
10	FW	ENG	Freddie Eastwood
12	FW	ENG	Lee Bradbury
13	GK	ENG	Steve Collis
14	MF	ENG	Lloyd Sam (on loan from Charlton Athletic)

No.	Pos.	Nation	Player
15	DF	ENG	Peter Clarke
16	DF	NGR	Efe Sodje
17	MF	ENG	Jamal Campbell-Ryce
18	MF	SCO	Steven Hammell
19	FW	ENG	Billy Paynter
20	FW	ENG	James Lawson
21	FW	ENG	Gary Hooper
23	FW	ENG	Charles Ademeno
24	FW	ENG	Matt Harrold
25	MF	BEL	Franck Moussa
26	MF	IRL	Alan McCormack
28	MF	ENG	Joel Ledgister
30	GK	ENG	Joe Welch

=== Left club during season ===
Note: Flags indicate national team as defined under FIFA eligibility rules; some limited exceptions apply. Players may hold more than one non-FIFA nationality.

No.	Pos.	Nation	Player
9	FW	ENG	Michael Ricketts (to Preston North End)
11	MF	ENG	Mitchell Cole (to Stevenage Borough)
14	MF	ENG	Luke Guttridge (to Leyton Orient)

No.	Pos.	Nation	Player
22	MF	ENG	Jay Smith (to Notts County)
27	FW	ESP	Arnau Riera (on loan from Sunderland)
