= Adam Barrett =

English footballer (born 1979)

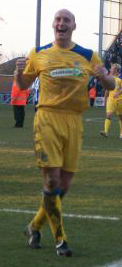
- Barrett playing for Southend United, 2009

Personal information
- Full name: Adam Nicholas Barrett
- Date of birth: 29 November 1979 (age 46)
- Place of birth: Dagenham, England
- Height: 1.78 m (5 ft 10 in)
- Position: Defender

Team information
- Current team: Cambridge United (assistant manager)

Senior career*
Years	Team	Apps	(Gls)
1998–1999	Leyton Orient	0	(0)
1999–2000	Plymouth Argyle	52	(3)
2000–2002	Mansfield Town	37	(1)
2002–2004	Bristol Rovers	90	(5)
2004–2010	Southend United	247	(27)
2010–2011	Crystal Palace	7	(0)
2011	→ Leyton Orient (loan)	14	(0)
2011–2012	AFC Bournemouth	21	(1)
2012–2015	Gillingham	88	(3)
2014–2015	→ AFC Wimbledon (loan)	23	(1)
2015–2017	Southend United	59	(4)
Total		638	(45)

Managerial career
- 2019: Millwall (caretaker)
- 2023: Millwall (caretaker)
- * Club domestic league appearances and goals

Adam Nicholas Barrett (born 29 November 1979) is an English former professional footballer who played as a central defender. During his career, which lasted from 1998 to 2017, he made 647 appearances in the Football League, including 308 for Southend United. He is assistant head coach at Cambridge United.

Born in Dagenham, Barrett began his career with Leyton Orient, but failed to make an appearance for them and moved on to sign for Plymouth Argyle, spending the 1999–2000 season with them. In 2000, he moved to Mansfield Town and then spent two years at Bristol Rovers before joining Southend United in 2004. He helped Southend from League Two to the Championship during a six-year stay at Roots Hall, and played over 250 times for the club before signing for Crystal Palace in 2010. He would go on to play for Leyton Orient (loan), AFC Bournemouth, Gillingham and AFC Wimbledon. In January 2015, he re-joined Southend United.

== Club career ==
=== Southend United ===
Barrett joined Southend United, on a free transfer at the beginning of the 2004–05 season. Successive promotions from League Two and League One in 2004–05 and 2005–06 saw Southend competing in the Championship for the 2006–07 season. Barrett quickly established himself as a fan's favourite. He scored 11 goals in his first season with the Blues, a high figure for a centre-back, and was voted Player of the Year by Southend fans.

Barrett was influential in Southend's sixth-place finish, though their season ended with a playoff semi-final defeat to Doncaster Rovers. He played the full 90 minutes in a memorable 1–1 draw with Chelsea at Stamford Bridge in the FA Cup third round on 3 January 2009. And he scored a goal in the replay, although Southend United would go on to lose the match 4–1.

On 24 June 2010, Barrett had his contract terminated by mutual consent.

=== Crystal Palace ===
Barrett signed a two-year contract for Crystal Palace on 6 July 2010. Barrett made his Palace debut on 10 August 2010, in a 0–1 win against Yeovil Town. He made his league debut in just over a week later against Ipswich Town. He played his last game for the club in a 1–1 draw against Watford in February 2011.

=== Leyton Orient ===
On 11 March 2011, Barrett returned on a month's loan to his first club Leyton Orient.

=== AFC Bournemouth ===
Barrett signed a two-year deal with AFC Bournemouth on 5 July 2011. Barrett scored against his former club Crystal Palace in a pre-season friendly against them on 30 July. The newly appointed captain then netted his first competitive Cherries goal in his first home league match; a 2–0 win over Sheffield Wednesday on 13 August 2011.

=== Gillingham ===
On 16 August 2012, Barrett signed a one-year deal with Gillingham with the option for the contract to be extended to two years. He was quickly made captain at Priestfield and led the Gills to win the League Two championship. His regular combative performances quickly won the fans over and he was awarded the club's Supporters' Player of the year and Away Supporters' Player of the year awards. Barrett was also named in the League Two team of the year.

=== Return to Southend United ===
On 15 January 2015, Barrett re-joined Southend United. An injury delayed Barrett's homecoming but he finally made his second debut for Southend as a second-half substitute against Cheltenham Town on 10 February 2015. At the end of the 2014–15 season he played for Southend in the League Two play-off final against Wycombe Wanderers. Southend won in a penalty shoot-out and were promoted to League One. The following month Barrett signed a new one-year contract at Southend, reversing his decision to retire which he had announced in February 2015. In March 2016, Barrett signed a further one-year deal keeping him at Southend until 2017. Towards the end of the 2015–16 season Barrett replaced John White as the captain, a role Barrett previously held in his first spell at the club before leaving in 2010.

On 24 September 2016, Barrett played his 350th game for Southend in all competitions, over two spells with his boyhood club

On 28 February 2017, Barrett announced his retirement from playing.

== Coaching career ==
On 10 March 2017, Barrett joined Millwall as first team development coach. Following the resignation of Neil Harris on 3 October 2019, Barrett took over as caretaker manager. In his first game in charge he led Millwall to a 2–1 win over Leeds United. He departed the club in December 2024.

On 20 May 2025, Barrett joined Cambridge United as assistant head coach, once again supporting Neil Harris.

== Career statistics ==
Information correct as of 11 May 2022.

Appearances and goals by club, season and competition
Club	Season	League			FA Cup		League Cup		Other		Total	
Club	Season	Division	Apps	Goals	Apps	Goals	Apps	Goals	Apps	Goals	Apps	Goals
Plymouth Argyle	1999–2000	Third Division	43	3	7	0	2	0	0	0	52	3
Plymouth Argyle	2000–01	Third Division	9	0	0	0	2	0	0	0	11	0
Plymouth Argyle	Total		52	3	7	0	4	0	0	0	63	3
Mansfield Town	2000–01	Third Division	8	1	0	0	1	0	0	0	9	1
Mansfield Town	2001–02	Third Division	29	0	3	0	1	0	0	0	33	0
Mansfield Town	Total		37	1	3	0	2	0	0	0	41	1
Bristol Rovers	2002–03	Third Division	45	1	4	1	2	0	0	0	51	2
Bristol Rovers	2003–04	Third Division	45	4	1	0	0	0	1	0	47	4
Bristol Rovers	Total		90	5	5	1	2	0	1	0	98	6
Southend United	2004–05	League Two	43	11	1	0	1	0	10	0	55	11
Southend United	2005–06	League One	45	3	2	0	1	0	1	0	49	3
Southend United	2006–07	Championship	28	3	3	0	3	0	0	0	34	3
Southend United	2007–08	League One	45	6	4	0	3	1	3	0	55	7
Southend United	2008–09	League One	45	2	5	1	1	0	1	0	52	3
Southend United	2009–10	League One	41	2	1	0	1	0	1	0	44	2
Southend United	Total		247	27	16	1	10	1	16	0	289	29
Crystal Palace	2010–11	Championship	7	0	0	0	2	0	0	0	9	0
Leyton Orient (loan)	2010–11	League One	14	0	0	0	0	0	0	0	14	0
AFC Bournemouth	2011–12	League One	21	1	2	0	2	0	3	0	28	1
Gillingham	2012–13	League Two	43	1	2	0	1	0	0	0	46	1
Gillingham	2013–14	League One	45	2	2	0	1	0	1	0	49	2
Gillingham	Total		88	3	4	0	2	0	1	0	95	3
AFC Wimbledon (loan)	2014–15	League Two	23	1	4	0	0	0	3	1	30	2
Southend United	2014–15	League Two	10	0	0	0	0	0	0	0	10	0
Southend United	2015–16	League One	37	4	0	0	0	0	2	0	39	4
Southend United	2016–17	League One	12	0	0	0	0	0	1	0	13	0
Southend United	Total		59	4	0	0	0	0	3	0	62	4
Career total			638	45	41	2	24	1	27	1	730	49

== Managerial statistics ==
As of match played 4 November 2023

Managerial record by team and tenure
Team	Nat	From	To	Record								Ref
Team	Nat	From	To	G	W	D	L	GF	GA	GD	Win %	Ref
Millwall (caretaker)	(England)	3 October 2019	22 October 2019	3	1	1	1	6	6	+0	33.33	
Millwall (caretaker)	(England)	18 October 2023	Present	4	0	2	2	4	6	−2	0.00	
Total				7	1	3	3	10	12	−2	14.29	—

== Honours ==
Southend United

- Football League One: 2005–06
- Football League Two play-offs: 2005, 2015
- Football League Trophy runner-up: 2004–05

Gillingham

- Football League Two: 2012–13

Individual

- PFA Fans' Player of the Year: 2004–05 League Two
- PFA Team of the Year: 2004–05 League Two, 2005–06 League One, 2012–13 League Two
- Gillingham Player of the Season: 2012–13
