= Mitchell Cole =

English footballer (1985-2012)

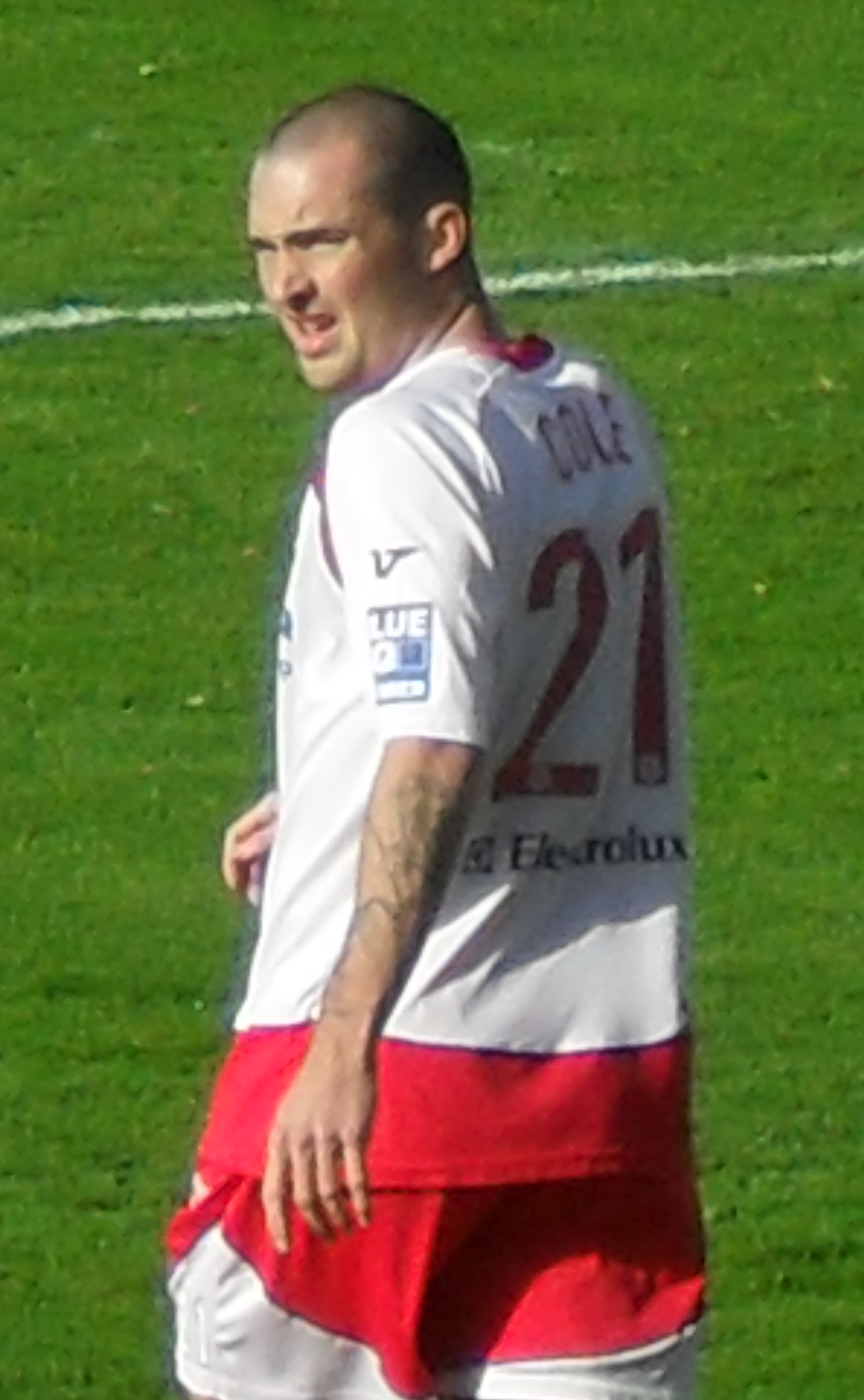
- Cole playing for Stevenage Borough in 2009

Personal information
- Full name: Mitchell James Cole
- Date of birth: 6 October 1985
- Place of birth: London, England
- Date of death: 30 November 2012 (aged 27)
- Place of death: Islington, London, England
- Height: 5 ft 11 in (1.80 m)
- Position: Left winger

Youth career
- 2001–2003: Norwich City
- 2003–2004: West Ham United

Senior career*
Years	Team	Apps	(Gls)
2004–2005	Grays Athletic	35	(5)
2005–2007	Southend United	33	(1)
2006	→ Northampton Town (loan)	8	(1)
2007–2010	Stevenage Borough	119	(20)
2010–2011	Oxford United	4	(0)
2011	Stotfold	2	(0)
2011	Hitchin Town	11	(1)
2011–2012	Biggleswade Town	6	(1)
2012	Arlesey Town	10	(1)
2012	Basildon United	1	(0)
Total		229	(30)

International career
2005–2009	England C	14	(7)
- * Club domestic league appearances and goals

Mitchell James Cole (6 October 1985 – 30 November 2012) was an English footballer who played as a left winger. He retired from professional football in 2011 after being diagnosed with hypertrophic cardiomyopathy, a heart condition that made it unsafe for him to continue playing competitively.

After beginning his career in the West Ham United academy, Cole joined Grays Athletic in 2004 and helped the club win the Conference South title and FA Trophy. He signed for Southend United in July 2005 and contributed to the club's promotion to the Championship as League One champions in his debut season. Cole transferred to Stevenage Borough in January 2007, scoring in the first competitive final at the new Wembley Stadium as the club won the FA Trophy. He won the competition again in 2009 and helped Stevenage secure promotion to the Football League as Conference Premier champions during the 2009–10 season.

Cole signed for Oxford United in June 2010, making six appearances before retiring from professional football in February 2011 due to his heart condition. He subsequently returned to semi-professional football, playing for Stotfold, Hitchin Town, Biggleswade Town, Arlesey Town, and Basildon United, making his final appearance for the club in September 2012. Internationally, he earned 14 caps and scored seven goals for the England C team, making him the second-highest goalscorer in the team's history. Cole died on 30 November 2012 while playing football with family and friends, with his death linked to his pre-existing heart condition.

== Early life ==
Mitchell James Cole was born on 6 October 1985 in London, England, and attended Moorfield Primary School.

== Club career ==
=== Early career ===
Cole began his football career at Norwich City's centre of excellence, based in Potters Bar, Hertfordshire, before joining West Ham United's academy when the centre closed. He signed his first professional contract with West Ham on the pitch at Upton Park. Shortly thereafter, he collapsed three times and was diagnosed with the genetic heart condition hypertrophic cardiomyopathy. West Ham honoured his contract but subsequently released him, citing the risk to his health. Cole did not play for a year, briefly contemplated retiring to become a black cab driver, and put on a stone in weight.

=== Grays Athletic ===
Despite his diagnosis, Cole continued to pursue a career in football, as little was then known about the condition and he felt able to manage it himself. In the summer of 2004, after meeting chairman Mick Woodward on a family holiday, Cole was invited to train with Conference South club Grays Athletic. He was subsequently offered a contract by manager Mark Stimson and played regularly during the 2004–05 season, making 47 appearances and scoring nine goals as Grays won the Conference South title. Cole also started in the 2005 FA Trophy final on 23 May 2005, in which Grays defeated Hucknall Town on penalties after a 1–1 draw; he was observed by scouts from Arsenal during the match.

=== Southend United ===
Cole's performances for Grays earned him a move to League One club Southend United for an undisclosed fee on 13 July 2005. He made his debut in the opening match of the 2005–06 season, starting in a 2–1 defeat against Port Vale at Roots Hall. He noted that the management style of Steve Tilson at Southend was similar to that of former manager Stimson, which helped him settle quickly at the club. Cole scored his only goal for Southend in a 3–1 victory over local rivals Colchester United, and made 31 appearances that season, as the team secured promotion to the Championship as League One champions.

Having made two appearances for Southend in the opening month of the 2006–07 season, Cole sought more regular playing time. Although Tilson was reluctant to let him leave, he allowed Cole to join League One club Northampton Town on a one-month loan. He made his debut in a 3–1 defeat to Tranmere Rovers at Sixfields, and scored his first goal for the club in a 1–0 away victory over Millwall at The Den on 24 September 2006. The loan was extended for a further month on 11 October 2006, with Cole making nine appearances in total before returning to Southend in November 2006. He featured three more times for the club that season before his run in the first team was curtailed.

=== Stevenage Borough ===
Cole joined Conference National club Stevenage Borough for a five-figure fee on 26 January 2007, reuniting with former Grays manager Stimson. He made his debut as a substitute in a 1–1 draw at Gravesend & Northfleet two days later, and went on to make 23 appearances that season, scoring three goals. His first came in a 4–4 away draw against Forest Green Rovers at The New Lawn on 9 April 2007. The following month, Cole scored Stevenage's opening goal in a 3–2 victory over Kidderminster Harriers in the FA Trophy final at Wembley Stadium, as the club came from two goals down to become the first team to win a competitive final at the new stadium in front of 53,262 spectators. At the start of the 2007–08 season, Cole sustained a knee injury in a match against Histon, ruling him out for six weeks. He made 27 appearances that campaign, scoring twice.

Under new manager Graham Westley, Cole scored 14 goals during the 2008–09 season, including his first competitive hat-trick in a 4–2 away win against Salisbury City at the Raymond McEnhill Stadium on 24 January 2009. He made 50 appearances in all competitions as Stevenage won the FA Trophy that season, marking Cole's third success in the competition. He signed a new two-year contract on 22 April 2009. In the 2009–10 season, Cole scored his first goal of the season in a 2–0 victory over Kidderminster Harriers on 5 December 2009. He was briefly deployed at left-back in January 2010, and recorded his second career hat-trick the following month, scoring three goals in seven minutes as a substitute in a 6–0 victory against Eastbourne Borough at Priory Lane on 2 March 2010. He made 41 appearances and scored four goals as Stevenage won the Conference Premier title, earning promotion to the Football League for the first time in the club's history. He left the club in June 2010, having made 144 appearances and scored 23 goals across three and a half seasons.

=== Oxford United ===
Cole joined newly promoted League Two club Oxford United on a two-year contract on 14 June 2010. He made his debut as an 81st-minute substitute in a 2–1 home defeat against Bury on 14 August 2010, and his first start came ten days later in a 1–0 League Cup defeat to former club West Ham United. Cole made six appearances in all competitions, with his last professional appearance coming in a 3–2 defeat to Macclesfield Town at Moss Rose on 16 October 2010.

=== Retirement from professional football ===
In February 2011, Cole was forced to retire from professional football on medical advice after his heart condition had worsened. He had begun experiencing shortness of breath during training and matches in late 2010, and a cardiologist advised that continuing to play competitively carried a serious risk to his health. Reflecting on his retirement, Cole stated: "It's like being hit by a ton of bricks because football is all I've ever known. I've managed to get eight years out of the professional game which I am extremely happy with".

=== Return to semi-professional football ===
Ahead of the 2011–12 season, Cole appeared in a number of pre-season friendlies for semi-professional club Stotfold of the Spartan South Midlands League and played in the opening match of the season, a 2–0 home win over Oxhey Jets at Roker Park on 13 August 2011. Two days later, he joined Southern League Premier Division club Hitchin Town on non-contract terms, making his debut for the club on the same day in a 3–0 home victory against Hemel Hempstead Town. As Cole had signed for Hitchin on a non-contract basis, he was available to play for Stotfold in a 2–1 home win against St Margaretsbury the following day. Cole scored his first goal for Hitchin in a 3–1 away victory over Bedford Town at The New Eyrie on 29 August 2011, and left the club in November 2011 after 15 appearances and one goal.

Cole then signed for Southern League Division One Central club Biggleswade Town, making his debut on 19 November 2011 as a substitute in a 1–1 draw with Slough Town at Langford Road. He scored once in six appearances before joining Arlesey Town on 7 January 2012, where he scored twice in 11 appearances. Cole stopped playing competitively in March 2012 after witnessing Fabrice Muamba's cardiac arrest, informing Arlesey's director of football Gary King that he would not play again. Cole subsequently appeared for Essex Senior League club Basildon United in a 1–0 away victory against Barkingside at Cricklefield Stadium on 22 September 2012.

== International career ==
Cole represented England at schoolboy level. He was called up to the England C team, who represent England at non-League level, in February 2005 for a friendly against the Netherlands. He scored the only goal in a 1–0 victory over Finland C in June 2007, and went on to score the match-winners in games against Wales XI and Gibraltar in 2008. Cole was subsequently selected for the England C tour of the Caribbean in June 2008, playing in both games against Grenada and Barbados. With seven goals in 14 appearances, Cole is the second-highest goalscorer in the history of the non-League national team.

== Style of play ==
Cole was deployed primarily as a left winger and was known for his pace, ability to take on players, and strong left foot. England C manager Paul Fairclough compared his playing style to that of Ryan Giggs, while manager Mark Stimson stated he had the ability to play at the highest level, highlighting his positional sense and capacity to beat opponents. His brother-in-law, Joe Cole, later noted that, although restricted by his heart condition, he remained technically gifted, quick, and highly talented.

== Death ==
Cole died on 30 November 2012, aged 27, at Finsbury Leisure Centre in Islington, London, while playing football with family and friends. His death was linked to his pre-existing heart condition.

=== Tributes ===
Tributes were widely paid to Cole following his death. Clubs and supporters paid tribute with moments of silence, black armbands, and applause in the minute corresponding to his squad number, while former teammates, including Jack Midson and Steve Morison, dedicated goals to him. He was also commemorated during the 2012 BBC Sports Personality of the Year ceremony.

A benefit match, titled 'Match for Mitch', was held on 7 May 2013 at Broadhall Way between a Mitchell Cole XI and a Stevenage XI, with proceeds going to his family and The Cardiomyopathy Association. The match was attended by 2,306 spectators. Participants included his brother-in-law Joe Cole, Andy Carroll, James Collins, Gary Hooper, Matt Jarvis, and Kevin Nolan, alongside numerous former teammates from his previous clubs.

== Personal life ==
Cole had three children with his wife, Charly, who is the sister of fellow professional footballer and England international Joe Cole. Their third child, daughter Leni, was born on 7 December 2012, just a week after Cole's death. Following his retirement from professional football in February 2011, he served as an ambassador for the Cardiomyopathy Association, raising awareness on the condition in the United Kingdom and the United States. His younger brother, Ben, helped establish The Mitchell Cole Memorial Tournament in his honour, raising funds for the charity Cardiomyopathy UK.

== Career statistics ==
Appearances and goals by club, season and competition
Club	Season	League			FA Cup		League Cup		Other		Total	
Club	Season	Division	Apps	Goals	Apps	Goals	Apps	Goals	Apps	Goals	Apps	Goals
Grays Athletic	2004–05	Conference South	35	5	0	0	—		12 (Note: Eight appearances and one goal in FA Trophy, three appearances and two goals in Conference League Cup, one appearance and one goal in Essex Senior Cup)	4	47	9
Southend United	2005–06	League One	29	1	2	0	1	0	0	0	32	1
Southend United	2006–07	Championship	4	0	0	0	1	0	0	0	5	0
Southend United	Total		33	1	2	0	2	0	0	0	37	1
Northampton Town (loan)	2006–07	League One	8	1	0	0	—		1 (Note: Appearance in Football League Trophy)	0	9	1
Stevenage Borough	2006–07	Conference National	19	2	0	0	—		6 (Note: Appearance(s) in FA Trophy)	1	25	3
Stevenage Borough	2007–08	Conference Premier	26	2	1	0	—		0	0	27	2
Stevenage Borough	2008–09	Conference Premier	42	12	3	1	—		6	1	50	14
Stevenage Borough	2009–10	Conference Premier	32	4	3	0	—		6	0	41	4
Stevenage Borough	Total		119	20	7	1	0	0	18	2	144	23
Oxford United	2010–11	League Two	4	0	0	0	1	0	1	0	6	0
Stotfold	2011–12	SSMFL Premier Division	2	0	0	0	—		0	0	2	0
Hitchin Town	2011–12	SFL Premier Division	11	1	1	0	—		3 (Note: Two appearances in FA Trophy; one appearance and one goal in Southern League Cup)	1	15	2
Biggleswade Town	2011–12	SFL Division One Central	6	1	—		—		0	0	6	1
Arlesey Town	2011–12	SFL Premier Division	10	1	—		—		1 (Note: Appearance in Bedfordshire Senior Cup)	1	11	2
Basildon United	2012–13	Essex Senior League	1	0	—		—		—		1	0
Career total			229	30	10	1	3	0	36	8	278	38

== Honours ==
Grays Athletic

- Conference South: 2004–05
- FA Trophy: 2004–05

Southend United

- Football League One: 2005–06

Stevenage Borough

- Conference Premier: 2009–10
- FA Trophy: 2006–07, 2008–09; runner-up: 2009–10
