= Jamal Campbell-Ryce =

Jamaican footballer (born 1983)

Personal information
- Full name: Jamal Julian Campbell-Ryce
- Date of birth: 6 April 1983 (age 43)
- Place of birth: Lambeth, London, England
- Height: 5 ft 6 in (1.68 m)
- Position: Winger

Team information
- Current team: Real Monarchs (Assistant Coach)

Senior career*
Years	Team	Apps	(Gls)
2001–2004	Charlton Athletic	3	(0)
2002	→ Leyton Orient (loan)	17	(2)
2004	→ Wimbledon (loan)	4	(0)
2004	→ Chesterfield (loan)	14	(0)
2004–2006	Rotherham United	31	(0)
2005–2006	→ Southend United (loan)	13	(0)
2006	→ Colchester United (loan)	4	(0)
2006–2007	Southend United	45	(2)
2007–2010	Barnsley	90	(12)
2010–2012	Bristol City	62	(2)
2012	→ Leyton Orient (loan)	8	(1)
2012–2014	Notts County	73	(11)
2014–2016	Sheffield United	37	(4)
2015	→ Notts County (loan)	4	(0)
2016	→ Chesterfield (loan)	9	(2)
2016–2018	Barnet	56	(5)
2018	Carlisle United	9	(0)
2018–2019	Stevenage	12	(0)
2019–2020	Colchester United	0	(0)
Total		491	(41)

International career^{‡}
2003–2009	Jamaica	18	(0)
- * Club domestic league appearances and goals as of 22:00, 5 January 2019 (UTC) ‡ National team caps and goals as of 12:34, 17 July 2015 (UTC)

Jamal Julian Campbell-Ryce (born 6 April 1983) is a former professional footballer who played as a winger. He is currently the Assistant Coach of Real Monarchs, the second team of Major League Soccer club Real Salt Lake.

Born in Lambeth, Greater London he began his career with Charlton Athletic in 2001 from where he has moved to a number of clubs, including Rotherham United, Southend United, Barnsley, Bristol City and Notts County before joining Sheffield United in 2014. He is also a former Jamaican international, qualifying through his parentage.

== Career ==
Campbell-Ryce played a handful of games for Southend United in the 05/06 season during a loan deal from Rotherham United. However, the deal turned sour, and left him in the limbo so Rotherham recalled him and sent him to Colchester United to get some first team football. The tricky winger has also played for Charlton Athletic, Chesterfield (where he scored once in the Football League Trophy against Macclesfield), Wimbledon, Colchester and Leyton Orient.

Campbell-Ryce joined Southend in the summer of 2006 after a deal was agreed between Southend and Rotherham. As both Southend and Colchester were promoted to the Championship at the end of the 2005–06 season, and Campbell-Ryce had played for both clubs during the season, he had the unusual privilege of touring both towns on open-top bus victory parades on successive days.

=== Barnsley ===
In early August in 2007, Southend rejected a £250,000 bid from Barnsley for Campbell-Ryce, though he finally completed his move to Barnsley on the deadline day for an undisclosed fee.

He scored his first Barnsley goal on 29 December 2007 in the 2–2 draw with Southampton, cutting in from the right and unleashing a rising piledriver into the top corner. On 26 January 2008, Campbell-Ryce scored the winner in Barnsley's 1–0 away win against his former club Southend in the fourth round of the FA Cup.

In October, Campbell-Ryce signed a new three-year deal at Oakwell, keeping him with Barnsley until the summer of 2011.

In February 2009, he scored at Hillsborough to sink Sheffield Wednesday and complete the first double over the Owls for 63 years and the Reds' first win there since 1983. On 3 May 2009 he scored the winner in a 2–1 win over Plymouth Argyle, a result which kept the club in the Championship.

=== Bristol City ===
On 19 January 2010, Campbell-Ryce signed a two-and-a-half-year deal with fellow Championship club Bristol City for an undisclosed fee. He made his debut in a 0–6 loss against Cardiff City on 26 January. Manager Keith Millen often used Campbell-Ryce as a wingback in his 3–5–2 formation. He scored his first goal for the club in the 3–0 win over Cardiff City, just under a year after signing. Campbell-Ryce established himself in the first team, playing regularly until Millen was replaced by Derek McInnes. Under McInnes' management, Campbell-Ryce started only two first-team games.

In order to get playing time in the first-team, Campbell-Ryce joined League One club Leyton Orient on loan until the end of the season, his second spell at the club. On 10 March 2012, Campbell-Ryce made his debut in a 2–0 loss against Tranmere Rovers and scored his first goal since his return in a 2–1 loss against Hartlepool United on 28 April 2012. He was released by Bristol City on 1 May 2012.

=== Notts County ===
Campbell-Ryce signed a two-year deal with League One club Notts County in July 2012. In the 2012–13 season Campbell-Ryce played 34 league matches and scored 9 goals.

=== Sheffield United ===
On 19 May 2014, Campbell-Ryce signed a two-year deal with Sheffield United which becomes effective on 1 July 2014 when his contract with Notts County expired; Campbell-Ryce was offered a new contract with the Magpies, as well as a number of other clubs, but turned it down in favour of United. On 26 February 2015, Campbell-Ryce joined former club Notts County on loan for the rest of the season with the option of a recall after 28 days. Campbell-Ryce spent the rest of the 2015–16 season on loan at Chesterfield, before being released by the Blades.

=== Barnet ===
Campbell-Ryce signed for Barnet in August 2016.

=== Carlisle United ===
Campbell-Ryce signed for fellow League Two club Carlisle United on 1 February 2018, joining for an undisclosed fee and on a short-term contract until the end of the 2017–18 season. The move reunited him with Carlisle manager Keith Curle, who he had previously played under at Notts County. He made his Carlisle debut two days after signing, on 3 February 2018, coming on as a second-half substitute in a 4–3 away loss at Wycombe Wanderers. At the end of the season, having made nine appearances during his three months with the club, he was released by Carlisle.

=== Stevenage ===
Campbell-Ryce signed for League Two club Stevenage on a free transfer on 29 May 2018. He was released by Stevenage at the end of the 2018–19 season.

=== Colchester United ===
Campbell-Ryce joined Colchester United on 19 August 2019, joining as coach for the under-23 team where he was also registered to play as an over-age player. He retired from playing at the end of the 2019–20 season.

== Coaching career ==
On 16 August 2022, Campbell-Ryce was appointed as a coach supporting the England youth teams as part of The Football Association and Professional Footballers' Association's joint England Elite Coach Programme (EECP).

== International career ==
Campbell-Ryce represented Jamaica between 2003 and 2009 winning 18 caps.

== Career statistics ==
As of match played 5 January 2019

Appearances and goals by club, season and competition
Club	Season	League			FA Cup		League Cup		Other		Total	
Club	Season	Division	Apps	Goals	Apps	Goals	Apps	Goals	Apps	Goals	Apps	Goals
Charlton Athletic	2002–03	Premier League	1	0	0	0	0	0	---		1	0
Charlton Athletic	2003–04	Premier League	2	0	0	0	2	0	---		4	0
Charlton Athletic	Total		3	0	0	0	2	0	---		5	0
Leyton Orient (loan)	2002–03	Third Division	17	2	0	0	2	1	0	0	19	3
Wimbledon (loan)	2003–04	First Division	4	0	0	0	0	0	0	0	4	0
Chesterfield (loan)	2004–05	League One	14	0	0	0	1	0	1 (Note: Appearance(s) in Football League Trophy)	1	16	1
Rotherham United	2004–05	Championship	24	0	1	0	0	0	---		25	0
Rotherham United	2005–06	League One	7	0	0	0	0	0	0	0	7	0
Rotherham United	Total		31	0	1	0	0	0	0	0	32	0
Southend United (loan)	2005–06	League One	13	0	2	0	0	0	1	0	16	0
Colchester United (loan)	2005–06	League One	4	0	0	0	0	0	0	0	4	0
Southend United	2006–07	Championship	43	2	3	0	4	0	---		50	2
Southend United	2007–08	League One	2	0	0	0	1	0	0	0	3	0
Southend United	Total		45	2	3	0	5	0	0	0	53	2
Barnsley	2007–08	Championship	37	3	5	1	0	0	---		42	4
Barnsley	2008–08	Championship	40	9	1	0	0	0	---		41	9
Barnsley	2009–10	Championship	13	0	1	0	3	0	---		17	0
Barnsley	Total		90	12	7	1	3	0	---		100	13
Bristol City	2009–10	Championship	14	0	0	0	0	0	---		14	0
Bristol City	2010–11	Championship	31	2	1	0	1	0	---		33	2
Bristol City	2011–12	Championship	17	0	0	0	1	0	---		18	0
Bristol City	Total		62	2	1	0	2	0	---		65	2
Leyton Orient (loan)	2011–12	League One	8	1	0	0	0	0	0	0	8	1
Notts County	2012–13	League One	37	8	2	0	0	0	1	0	40	8
Notts County	2013–14	League One	36	3	1	0	1	0	2	0	40	3
Notts County	Total		73	11	3	0	1	0	3	0	80	11
Sheffield United	2014–15	League One	19	4	5	2	6	0	2	1	32	7
Sheffield United	2015–16	League One	18	0	1	0	0	0	2	0	21	0
Sheffield United	Total		37	4	6	2	6	0	4	1	53	7
Notts County (loan)	2014–15	League One	4	0	0	0	0	0	0	0	4	0
Chesterfield (loan)	2015–16	League One	9	2	0	0	0	0	0	0	9	2
Barnet	2016–17	League Two	32	1	0	0	0	0	0	0	32	1
Barnet	2017–18	League Two	24	4	1	0	2	0	0	0	27	4
Barnet	Total		56	5	1	0	2	0	0	0	59	5
Carlisle United	2017–18	League Two	9	0	0	0	0	0	0	0	9	0
Stevenage	2018–19	League Two	12	0	1	0	0	0	1 (Note: Appearance in EFL Trophy)	0	14	0
Colchester United	2019–20	League Two	0	0	0	0	0	0	0	0	0	0
Career total			491	41	25	3	24	1	10	2	550	47
