= Carl Pettefer =

English footballer

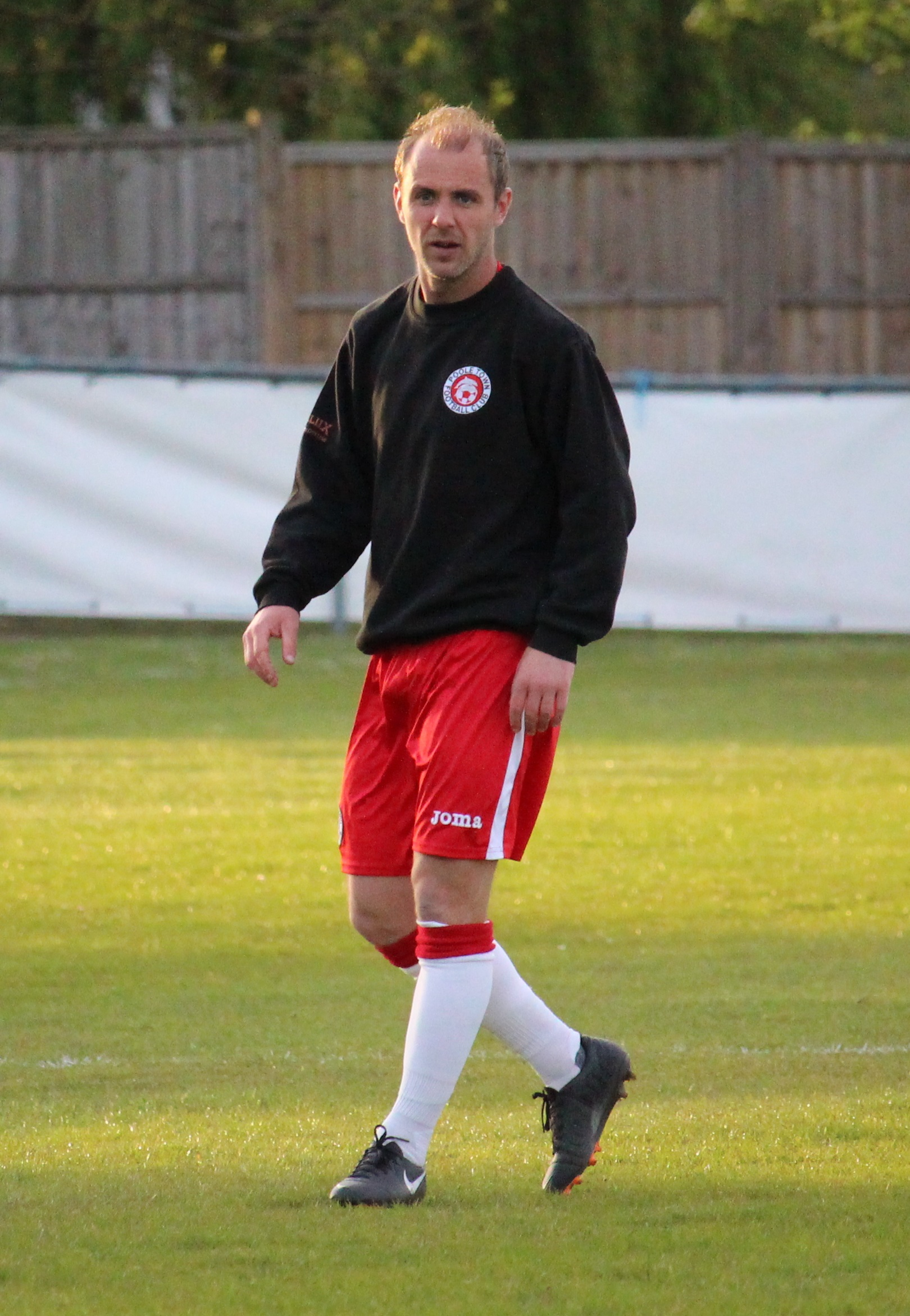

Personal information
- Full name: Carl James Pettefer
- Date of birth: 22 March 1981 (age 45)
- Place of birth: Taplow, England
- Height: 5 ft 7 in (1.70 m)
- Position: Midfielder

Team information
- Current team: Wimborne Town

Senior career*
| Years | Team | Apps | (Gls) |
| 1999–2004 | Portsmouth | 3 | (0) |
| 2002–2003 | → Exeter City (loan) | 37 | (1) |
| 2004–2006 | Southend United | 74 | (0) |
| 2006–2008 | Oxford United | 62 | (1) |
| 2008 | AFC Bournemouth | 1 | (0) |
| 2008 | Bognor Regis Town | | |
| 2008–2013 | AFC Totton | 229 | (2) |
| 2013–2018 | Poole Town | 176 | (1) |
| 2018- | Wimborne Town | 29 | |
- * Club domestic league appearances and goals as of 16:44, 12 June 2020 (UTC)

Carl James Pettefer (born 22 March 1981) is an English footballer, who plays for Wimborne Town.

== Career ==
Pettefer began his career at Portsmouth, signing his professional papers with then manager Alan Ball in August 1999 when aged 17. He made his full debut for Portsmouth against West Bromwich Albion in the Football League Championship when the club was under the management of Graham Rix.

He moved to Exeter City on loan in October 2002, making 37 appearances in total, before taking up a further loan period at Southend United towards the end of the 2003–04 season. He played regularly for the club during this spell, appearing in the side that lost to Blackpool in the Football League Trophy final at the Millennium Stadium, Cardiff. Despite breaking his leg in a fixture against Huddersfield Town, manager Steve Tilson signed him permanently at the end of 2003–04 season. He went on to make 74 appearances for the club as a right midfielder. He returned to the Millennium Stadium on two further occasions with Southend. Firstly, for a second successive Football League Trophy final, which Southend lost 2–0 to Wrexham after extra time and then for the 2004–05 season League Two Promotion Play-off. Southend beat Lincoln City 2-0 (after extra time) and won promotion to League One. He was the only Southend player to start all of the club's league and cup fixtures in that season.

Following an injury affected season in 2005-06 during which Southend gained promotion to the Championship as league winners, he was signed by Oxford United, playing under manager Jim Smith, in the Conference National. However, in January 2008, he was transfer listed by manager Darren Patterson, who had taken over from Smith, subsequently being released on 29 April 2008.

He went on trial at AFC Bournemouth during the summer of 2008 and impressed manager Kevin Bond to earn himself a contract. With opportunities for first team appearances limited, he moved to Bognor Regis Town and subsequently to AFC Totton in 2008, where he eventually became captain.

In 2013 he moved from AFC Totton to Poole Town. He transferred from Poole to Wimborne Town in December 2018.

== Honours ==
Southend United

- Football League Two play-offs: 2005
- Football League Trophy runner-up: 2003–04, 2004–05
