= Luke Guttridge =

English footballer (born 1982)

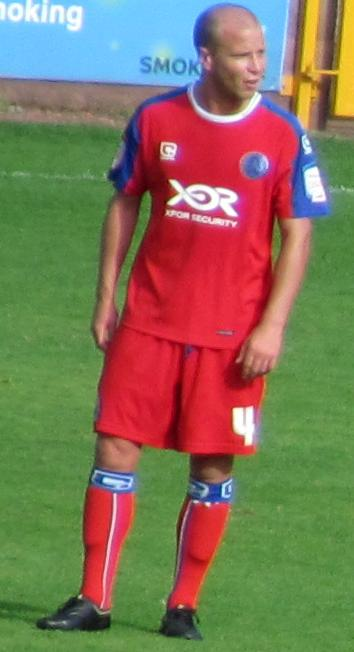
- Guttridge playing for Aldershot Town in 2010

Personal information
- Full name: Luke Horace Guttridge
- Date of birth: 27 March 1982 (age 44)
- Place of birth: Barnstaple, England
- Height: 5 ft 5 in (1.65 m)
- Position: Midfielder

Youth career
- 1998–1999: Torquay United

Senior career*
Years	Team	Apps	(Gls)
1999–2000	Torquay United	1	(0)
2000–2005	Cambridge United	136	(17)
2005–2007	Southend United	63	(5)
2006–2007	→ Leyton Orient (loan)	7	(1)
2007	Leyton Orient	10	(0)
2007–2008	Colchester United	14	(0)
2008–2010	Northampton Town	56	(6)
2010–2012	Aldershot Town	66	(12)
2012–2013	Northampton Town	44	(4)
2013–2016	Luton Town	67	(18)
2016–2017	Dagenham & Redbridge	30	(9)
Total		494	(72)
- * Club domestic league appearances and goals

Luke Horace Guttridge (born 27 March 1982) is an English former professional footballer who played as a midfielder. He previously played for Torquay United, Cambridge United, Southend United, Leyton Orient, Colchester United, Northampton Town, Aldershot Town, Luton Town and Dagenham & Redbridge. He amassed more than 400 appearances in the Football League.

== Career ==
=== Torquay United ===
Born in Barnstaple, Devon, Guttridge began his career as a trainee with Torquay United after playing junior football for Paignton Pilgrims. He made his league debut whilst still a trainee as a late substitute, replacing Alex Watson in the 4–0 win against Mansfield Town on 10 April 2000. In May 2000, against the advice for a longer contract offer given by youth coaches Paul Compton and Richard Hancox, Guttridge was only offered a three-month professional contract by Torquay manager Wes Saunders, even though Cambridge United had offered him a one-year deal and the chance to play Second Division football.

=== Cambridge United ===
Unsurprisingly, Guttridge left for Cambridge, managed by Roy McFarland, on a free transfer. He had to wait until the following spring for his Cambridge league debut, after playing twice in the Football League Trophy, but when it came he scored within two minutes in a vital 2–0 home win against Oldham Athletic. In August 2001, McFarland, by now manager of Torquay, made a bid to bring Guttridge back to Plainmoor, but this was rejected and he remained at the Abbey Stadium. In April 2004, Guttridge went on trial with Premier League club Charlton Athletic and trained with them during this time. However, a move failed to materialise and he returned to Cambridge. Ahead of the 2004–05 season, Guttridge was selected as club captain.

=== Southend United ===
Guttridge signed a three-year contract with Southend United in March 2005 for an undisclosed fee plus add-ons. After a slow start, he firmly established himself in the first-team and was given the opportunity to move into the role of a central midfielder from his usual wide midfielder role following a meeting with manager Steve Tilson. This proved to be a turning point and Guttridge was a major factor in helping Southend secure the 2005–06 League One title after a 1–0 home win over Bristol City on the final day of the season.

=== Leyton Orient ===
Guttridge lost his place in the Southend first-team following their promotion and subsequently joined Leyton Orient on loan until 1 January 2007. He scored his first and what turned out to be only goal for the club in a 3–1 away win over Nottingham Forest on 16 December 2006. On 30 January 2007, Guttridge left Southend to sign a permanent contract at Leyton Orient for an undisclosed fee until the end of the 2006–07 season. After rejecting a new contract offer from Leyton Orient, he left the club in May 2007.

=== Colchester United ===
On 5 July 2007, Guttridge joined Championship club Colchester United on a free transfer. After playing in only 14 league games during the 2007–08 season, Guttridge was released by the club following their relegation to League One.

=== Northampton Town ===
Guttridge impressed during a trial period at Northampton Town, and on 4 August 2008, after two commanding performances in pre-season friendlies, he signed a two-year contract with the club until the summer of 2010. His first goal for the club came during a 4–0 win over Stockport County on 21 March 2009. He was released by the club on 12 May 2010 along with five other players.

=== Aldershot Town ===
In July 2010, Guttridge signed a two-year contract with Aldershot Town. He was voted Supporters Player of the Season after an impressive first year with the Shots. Having made 80 appearances for Aldershot in all competitions, scoring 14 goals, Guttridge was released in January 2012 after his contract was cancelled by mutual consent.

=== Return to Northampton ===
On 27 January 2012, Guttridge rejoined Northampton Town on an 18-month contract until the end of the 2012–13 season. "Luke is a very experienced player and is just the sort of character we need," said Northampton manager Aidy Boothroyd. Guttridge made 44 league appearances, but was not offered a new contract and left the club in June 2013.

=== Luton Town ===
Guttridge signed for Conference Premier club Luton Town on a two-year contract on 5 July 2013. He was played in an advanced creative midfielder role for much of the 2013–14 season, scoring 13 goals and assisting 9 others in 32 league games, making him one of the most effective performers as Luton won the Conference Premier title and with it promotion to League Two. Guttridge's performances led his teammates to name him as the Players' Player of the Year. Guttridge played in 30 games for Luton during the 2014–15 season upon his return to the Football League, scoring four goals, and triggered a contract extension to keep him at the club until the summer of 2016. Guttridge made 11 appearances, scoring two goals in 2015–16, but he was released by new manager Nathan Jones on 19 January 2016 after his contract was cancelled by mutual consent.

=== Dagenham & Redbridge ===
Guttridge signed a one-and-a-half-year contract with League Two club Dagenham & Redbridge two days after his release by Luton. He was restricted to just three appearances, scoring once in 2015–16 due to injury, as the club were relegated to the National League after finishing in 23rd place in League Two. Guttridge scored Dagenham's second goal on the opening day of 2016–17 in a 3–0 win at home to Southport. He was introduced as a half-time substitute in the second leg of the play-off semi-final defeat to Forest Green Rovers, losing 3–1 on aggregate, and finished the season with 30 appearances and eight goals. Guttridge was released by Dagenham & Redbridge when his contract expired at the end of 2016–17.

== Career statistics ==
As of match played 7 May 2017

Appearances and goals by club, season and competition
Club	Season	League			FA Cup		League Cup		Other		Total	
Club	Season	Division	Apps	Goals	Apps	Goals	Apps	Goals	Apps	Goals	Apps	Goals
Torquay United	1999–2000	Third Division	1	0	0	0	0	0	0	0	1	0
Cambridge United	2000–01	Second Division	1	1	0	0	0	0	2 (Note: Appearance(s) in Football League Trophy)	0	3	1
Cambridge United	2001–02	Second Division	29	2	1	0	1	0	4	1	35	3
Cambridge United	2002–03	Third Division	43	3	3	0	1	0	5	1	52	4
Cambridge United	2003–04	Third Division	46	11	3	1	1	0	1	0	51	12
Cambridge United	2004–05	League Two	17	0	0	0	1	0	—		18	0
Cambridge United	Total		136	17	7	1	4	0	12	2	159	20
Southend United	2004–05	League Two	5	0	—		—		3 (Note: Two appearances in League Two play-offs, one in Football League Trophy)	0	8	0
Southend United	2005–06	League One	41	5	1	0	0	0	0	0	42	5
Southend United	2006–07	Championship	17	0	3	0	2	0	—		22	0
Southend United	Total		63	5	4	0	2	0	3	0	72	5
Leyton Orient	2006–07	League One	17	1	—		—		—		17	1
Colchester United	2007–08	Championship	14	0	1	0	1	0	—		16	0
Northampton Town	2008–09	League One	25	2	1	0	2	1	1	0	29	3
Northampton Town	2009–10	League Two	31	4	2	2	0	0	1	0	34	6
Northampton Town	Total		56	6	3	2	2	1	2	0	63	9
Aldershot Town	2010–11	League Two	41	8	3	0	1	0	2	0	47	8
Aldershot Town	2011–12	League Two	25	4	3	1	4	1	1	0	33	6
Aldershot Town	Total		66	12	6	1	5	1	3	0	80	14
Northampton Town	2011–12	League Two	19	3	—		—		—		19	3
Northampton Town	2012–13	League Two	25	1	0	0	2	0	3 (Note: Appearances in League Two play-offs)	1	30	2
Northampton Town	Total		44	4	0	0	2	0	3	1	49	5
Luton Town	2013–14	Conference Premier	32	13	1	0	—		0	0	33	13
Luton Town	2014–15	League Two	27	3	1	1	1	0	1	0	30	4
Luton Town	2015–16	League Two	8	2	1	0	0	0	2	0	11	2
Luton Town	Total		67	18	3	1	1	0	3	0	74	19
Dagenham & Redbridge	2015–16	League Two	3	1	—		—		—		3	1
Dagenham & Redbridge	2016–17	National League	27	8	2	0	—		1 (Note: Appearance in National League play-offs)	0	30	8
Dagenham & Redbridge	Total		30	9	2	0	—		1	0	33	9
Career total			494	72	26	5	17	2	27	3	564	82

== Honours ==
Cambridge United

- Football League Trophy runner-up: 2001–02

Southend United

- Football League One: 2005–06
- Football League Two play-offs: 2004–05
- Football League Trophy runner-up: 2004–05

Luton Town

- Conference Premier: 2013–14

Individual

- Conference Premier Team of the Year: 2013–14
