= Lee Bradbury =

English footballer and manager (born 1975)

- Bradbury in 2022

Personal information
- Full name: Lee Michael Bradbury
- Date of birth: 3 July 1975 (age 51)
- Place of birth: Cowes, Isle of Wight, England
- Height: 1.83 m (6 ft 0 in)
- Positions: Striker; midfielder; right-back

Youth career
- 1989–199?: Plessey Reserves
- 199?–199?: Somerton Middle
- 199?–1991: Cowes High

Senior career*
Years	Team	Apps	(Gls)
1995–1997	Portsmouth	54	(15)
1995	→ Exeter City (loan)	14	(5)
1997–1998	Manchester City	40	(10)
1998–1999	Crystal Palace	32	(6)
1999	→ Birmingham City (loan)	8	(0)
1999–2004	Portsmouth	99	(28)
2002–2003	→ Sheffield Wednesday (loan)	11	(3)
2003–2004	→ Derby County (loan)	7	(0)
2004	Walsall	8	(1)
2004–2006	Oxford United	63	(9)
2006–2007	Southend United	47	(5)
2007	→ AFC Bournemouth (loan)	1	(0)
2007–2011	AFC Bournemouth	126	(10)
Total		510	(92)

International career
	England U21	3	(0)

Managerial career
- 2011–2012: AFC Bournemouth
- 2012–2019: Havant & Waterlooville
- 2019: Eastbourne Borough
- 2022–2023: Eastleigh
- 2025–2026: Dagenham & Redbridge
- * Club domestic league appearances and goals

Lee Michael Bradbury (born 3 July 1975) is an English football manager and former player who was most recently manager of Dagenham & Redbridge. A versatile player, he primarily played as a striker and scored 105 goals in 572 league and cup games in a 16-year professional career. His son, Harvey, also plays professional football.

Bradbury joined the British Army upon leaving school at the age of 16 and served the Princess of Wales's Royal Regiment in Northern Ireland. He was discharged from military service to sign with Portsmouth in 1995. He played on loan at Exeter City before being named Portsmouth's Player of the Season after scoring 17 goals in the 1996–97 campaign. He was purchased by Manchester City for a club record £3 million in July 1997. However, he did not enjoy a successful time at City and was sold to Crystal Palace for £1.5 million in October 1998. He ended the 1998–99 season on loan at Birmingham City and returned to Portsmouth for a £300,000 fee in October 1999. He played 106 games in just over four seasons in his second spell at the club. He also spent time on loan at Sheffield Wednesday and Derby County. He joined Walsall on a free transfer in March 1999 and then moved on to Oxford United three months later. He spent almost two seasons with Oxford and then ended the 2005–06 season helping Southend United to win the League One title. He joined his final club, AFC Bournemouth, in August 2007, where he would be promoted out of League Two in 2009–10.

Bradbury retired as a player after being appointed manager of AFC Bournemouth, where he worked from January 2011 to March 2012. He then spent seven years as manager of Havant & Waterlooville, winning the Isthmian League Premier Division in 2016–17 and the National League South title in 2017–18. He took charge of Eastbourne Borough in May 2019 but left in October 2019 and became assistant head coach at Crawley Town. He returned to management at Eastleigh in February 2022, though he was sacked in August 2023. He worked at Arsenal and Port Vale before he joined Dagenham & Redbridge as first team manager in June 2025. He was sacked by Dagenham in March 2026.

== Early and personal life ==
Lee Michael Bradbury was born in Cowes, on the Isle of Wight on 3 July 1975. At 15, he wrote to all 92 clubs in the English Football League to request a trial. He left Cowes High School two days before his 16th birthday and joined the British Army the day after his birthday. He became a frontline rifleman and toured Northern Ireland for two years. He was a key player for the Princess of Wales's Royal Regiment and Warrant Officier Bob Jeffrey quipped that "his accuracy with a football is better than with a rifle". He played for Cowes Sports whilst on leave. He also played B division football for Ballinamallard United and turned out for Halstead Town and Fivemiletown United. He patrolled Omagh for two years after turning 18, performing searches for terrorist activity. Contrary to reports that he bought himself out of the army, he was in fact given an honourable discharge after four and a half years of service to pursue his professional football career.

He married Hayley, from Newport, Isle of Wight, and had two children: Harvey and Millie. Harvey became a professional footballer with numerous clubs, including Oxford United, leaving them as the first father and son to play for the club. Bradbury stood trial for assault in 2001 following an alleged fracas outside a nightclub. Bradbury began suffering anxiety attacks and was diagnosed with post-traumatic stress disorder (PTSD) after witnessing the death of his friend Ryan McKinlay in a boating accident in June 2015. He launched a clothing brand, Bridge, to raise money for PTSD charities.

== Playing career ==
=== Portsmouth ===
Bradbury started his professional career following a successful trial at Portsmouth after his army coach recommended him to the club. He moved out on loan to Exeter City of the Third Division to play first-team football in December 1995. He scored a brace against Leyton Orient in his home debut at St James Park. He scored five goals in 14 league starts for Exeter. He was recalled to Portsmouth to cover for Paul Walsh, who had picked up an injury. He featured in 12 First Division games for Pompey in the 1995–96 season without scoring a goal.

He scored his first goal for the club on 1 October 1996, in a 2–2 draw with Crystal Palace at Fratton Park. He scored his first career hat-trick in a 4–2 home win over Barnsley on 22 April 1997 and was hailed as the discovery of the season by manager Terry Fenwick. He scored 17 goals in 49 games in the 1996–97 season, winning the club's Player of the Season award. He was also capped by England at under-21 level.

=== Manchester City ===
On 30 July 1997, he was purchased by Manchester City manager Frank Clark for a club record £3 million. Despite being the club's record transfer signing, chairman Francis Lee later claimed to have been on holiday in Portugal at the time and said that "we would definitely not have signed him if I had seen him play". He failed to score in his first six games for the club. He suffered a hairline fracture on his back, which caused him to be out of action from early October until early January. He struggled to make an impact at Maine Road and by the following March he was devoid of confidence after being booed and jeered by City fans. At the end of the 1997–98 season, City were relegated from the First Division, with Bradbury having scored seven goals in 29 games.

He scored on the opening day of the 1998–99 season, though he was warned to improve his performances by manager Joe Royle, who maintained he still had faith in the young striker. He scored four goals from 17 games before being sold early in the season.

=== Crystal Palace ===
On 23 October 1998, Bradbury was signed by Crystal Palace for £1.5 million, who were coached by Terry Venables until he was replaced by Steve Coppell in January. Bradbury struggled for form in the 1998–99 campaign, as did many of his teammates. On 25 March 1999, he joined Trevor Francis's Birmingham City on loan until the end of the 1998–99 season. He played eight First Division games during a short stay at St Andrew's, helping Birmingham to qualify for the play-offs, where they were beaten by Watford on a penalty shoot-out despite Bradbury successfully converting his penalty kick. On 2 October 1999, he played in a 4–0 win over Portsmouth at Selhurst Park, and 12 days later was sold to his former club for a £300,000 fee.

=== Return to Portsmouth ===
Bradbury signed a five-year contract upon rejoining Portsmouth, who were managed by Alan Ball. He scored 10 goals in 36 games – including three goals in two games against former club Manchester City – as Portsmouth ended the 1999–2000 season in 18th-place with new manager Tony Pulis steering the club away from relegation. On 3 February 2001, Bradbury was sent off for stamping on Preston North End defender Colin Murdock in what manager Steve Claridge described as "a stupid thing to do". He ended the 2001–02 season with seven goals in 23 appearances. He was sidelined halfway through the campaign after suffering a cruciate knee ligament injury; the injury would keep him out of action for a year.

On 26 December 2002, Bradbury was loaned out to First Division rivals Sheffield Wednesday for one month after manager Chris Turner needed cover for the injured Lloyd Owusu. He returned to Portsmouth early due to a shoulder injury, but went back to Hillsborough on loan at the end of February. He was recalled to Portsmouth in April by Harry Redknapp after Yakubu Aiyegbeni picked up an injury. His first game back at Pompey was against Sheffield Wednesday, and he was named man of the match as he scored in a 2–1 home defeat.

Portsmouth won promotion to the Premier League at the end of the 2002–03 season, though Bradbury did not feature for the club in the top flight. On 14 August 2003, he joined First Division Derby County on loan. However, he was taken off injured 74 minutes into his debut and manager George Burley requested that the Football League scrub his loan from the club's records. He instead returned to Derby after three months spent recovering at Portsmouth. He played a total of seven games for the club.

=== Walsall ===
On 25 March 2004, Bradbury joined First Division Walsall on a free transfer, with manager Colin Lee seeing him as a target man to play off Jermaine McSporran. He scored one goal, against Derby County at Pride Park, in eight games for the club, which was not enough to prevent relegation into the third tier under the stewardship of Paul Merson.

=== Oxford United ===
In June 2004, he was signed by Oxford United manager Graham Rix, who had previously coached him at Portsmouth. Rix was replaced by Ramón Díaz halfway through the 2004–05 season, though Bradbury remained as club captain he was playing as a midfielder. In the summer, he requested new manager Brian Talbot play him in his familiar striking role. He started the 2005–06 season in a striking partnership with Steve Basham but was soon moved back into midfield by Talbot. He left the club amidst a contractual dispute, having scored nine goals in 63 League Two games.

=== Southend United ===
Bradbury signed a four-month contract with Southend United on 1 February 2006. He scored one goal in 15 appearances at the end of the 2005–06 season as Southend won promotion as champions of League One. He remained a key player in the Championship, scoring five goals from 35 games in the 2006–07 relegation campaign. He left Roots Hall after asking manager Steve Tilson to let him join a club closer to his home on the South Coast.

=== AFC Bournemouth ===
On 24 August 2007, Bradbury signed for AFC Bournemouth on a four-month loan deal. Manager Kevin Bond had first attempted to sign him on loan the previous November. After playing one game for the club the loan was made permanent. Bradbury signed a contract until the end of the season. He was an ever-present until he picked up a three-game suspension after being sent off against Leeds United on 6 November. He went on to feature for the club in midfield and at right-back, as well as in his usual position as a striker. Bournemouth were relegated from League One at the end of the 2007–08 season, with Bradbury contributing five goals from 39 games. He then scored six goals from 41 appearances as the club finished just two places above relegation out of the Football League. A change of fortune followed at Dean Court in the 2009–10 season, as Bournemouth secured promotion from League Two in second-place, with Bradbury making 49 appearances.

== Style of play ==
Bradbury was a hard-working forward with pace and strength.

== Management career ==
=== AFC Bournemouth ===
On 15 January 2011, Bradbury was appointed as caretaker manager at AFC Bournemouth after the departure of Eddie Howe to Burnley. The next day, he announced his retirement from playing, and on 28 January, was given a two-and-a-half-year deal as permanent manager of the club. Bournemouth finished the 2010–11 season in sixth-place, going on to lose to Huddersfield Town in the play-off semi-finals after losing a penalty shoot-out.

In January 2012, Bradbury signed an improved three-and-a-half-year contract to keep him at Bournemouth until the summer of 2015. However, he was given a vote of confidence by chairman Eddie Mitchell two months later after his side lost five successive league games. On 25 March, Bradbury was dismissed from Bournemouth following a run of poor form that left the club 13th in the table. The club won two of their remaining eight games under the stewardship of caretaker manager Paul Groves, who became the club's permanent manager at the end of the 2011–12 season.

=== Havant & Waterlooville ===
Bradbury was appointed manager of Conference South club Havant & Waterlooville on 9 October 2012. He was named as Conference South Manager of the Month for March 2013. Striker Ollie Palmer finished as the division's joint-top scorer as the club posted a tenth-place finish at the end of the 2012–13 season. Bradbury completed his UEFA A License in 2013. The Hawks finished sixth in 2013–14, missing out on a play-off place on goal difference. A fifth-place finish in 2014–15 secured them a play-off place, however, they lost to Boreham Wood at the semi-final stage. On 30 April 2016, Havant & Waterlooville's relegation from the National League South was confirmed after they ended the 2015–16 season inside the relegation zone on goal difference. Bradbury aimed to secure an immediate promotion by signing a squad full of locally based players such as Bradley Tarbuck and Jason Prior.

Havant and Waterlooville won promotion as champions of the Isthmian League Premier Division at the end of the 2016–17 season. Bradbury earned the Manager of the Year award for winning the league and signed a new two-year contract in April 2017. He signed prominent non-League striker Matt Tubbs in May 2017. The Hawks played the 2017–18 season back in the National League South and won it at the first attempt, gaining promotion to the top tier of non-League football. In December 2018, he was made the bookies' favourite to become the new manager of Hartlepool United. He left the club by mutual consent on 22 April 2019 after relegation back to the National League South was confirmed with a 22nd-place finish in 2018–19. He later said that "I think the club were surprised to go up and were not quite ready". Chairman Derek Pope meanwhile stated that "the players let him down" as they were unwilling to train three times a week.

=== Eastbourne Borough ===
On 7 May 2019, Bradbury was appointed as manager of National League South club Eastbourne Borough. He left the club after agreeing to cancel his contract on 22 October 2019 as the club faced an acute financial crisis.

=== Crawley Town (assistant) ===
In December 2019, he was appointed assistant head coach of Crawley Town in League Two, alongside newly appointed head coach John Yems. He remained with Crawley until February 2022, becoming a popular figure at Broadfield Stadium as Crawley underwent a giantkilling run in the FA Cup, which included a win over Premier League Leeds United.

=== Eastleigh ===
On 28 February 2022, Bradbury was appointed manager of National League club Eastleigh. He said he wanted to play "aggressive, attacking football". Eastleigh finished the 2021–22 season in ninth place, four points shy of the play-off places. On 26 August 2023, Bradbury was relieved of his duties as manager of Eastleigh, following a 2–0 defeat to Southend United.

=== Return to coaching ===
After leaving Eastleigh, Bradbury worked as Arsenal's Southern Area Talent ID Scout. He then joined Darren Moore at Port Vale in February 2024.

=== Dagenham & Redbridge ===
On 4 June 2025, Bradbury was appointed manager of National League South side Dagenham & Redbridge. The club signed former England striker Andy Carroll the following month following investment by a consortium from Qatar. On 18 March 2026, Bradbury was sacked as Dagenham manager. This came shortly after influencer KSI bought a minority amount of stock, with former England intnernational striker Andy Carroll installed as Bradbury's successor.

== Career statistics ==
=== Playing ===
Appearances and goals by club, season and competition
Club	Season	League			FA Cup		League Cup		Other		Total	
Club	Season	Division	Apps	Goals	Apps	Goals	Apps	Goals	Apps	Goals	Apps	Goals
Portsmouth	1995–96	First Division	12	0	0	0	0	0	—		12	0
Portsmouth	1996–97	First Division	42	15	4	2	3	0	—		49	17
Portsmouth	Total		54	15	4	2	3	0	0	0	61	17
Exeter City (loan)	1995–96	Third Division	14	5	0	0	0	0	—		14	5
Manchester City	1997–98	First Division	27	7	0	0	2	0	—		29	7
Manchester City	1998–99	Second Division	13	3	0	0	4	1	—		17	4
Manchester City	Total		40	10	0	0	6	1	0	0	46	11
Crystal Palace	1998–99	First Division	22	4	1	1	0	0	—		23	5
Crystal Palace	1999–2000	First Division	10	2	0	0	4	1	—		14	3
Crystal Palace	Total		32	6	1	1	4	1	0	0	37	8
Birmingham City (loan)	1998–99	First Division	8	0	0	0	0	0	2 (Note: Appearance(s) in play-offs)	0	10	0
Portsmouth	1999–2000	First Division	35	10	1	0	0	0	—		36	10
Portsmouth	2000–01	First Division	39	10	1	1	4	0	—		44	11
Portsmouth	2001–02	First Division	22	7	0	0	1	0	—		23	7
Portsmouth	2002–03	First Division	3	1	0	0	0	0	—		3	1
Portsmouth	2003–04	Premier League	0	0	0	0	0	0	—		0	0
Portsmouth	Total		99	28	2	1	5	0	0	0	106	29
Sheffield Wednesday (loan)	2002–03	First Division	11	3	0	0	0	0	—		11	3
Derby County (loan)	2003–04	First Division	7	0	0	0	0	0	—		7	0
Walsall	2003–04	First Division	8	1	0	0	0	0	—		8	1
Oxford United	2004–05	League Two	41	4	1	1	1	0	1 (Note: Appearance(s) in the Football League Trophy)	0	44	5
Oxford United	2005–06	League Two	22	5	4	0	1	0	2	0	29	5
Oxford United	Total		63	9	5	1	2	0	3	0	73	10
Southend United	2005–06	League One	15	1	0	0	0	0	—		15	1
Southend United	2006–07	Championship	31	4	3	1	1	0	—		35	5
Southend United	2007–08	League One	1	0	0	0	1	3	—		2	3
Southend United	Total		47	5	3	1	2	3	0	0	52	9
AFC Bournemouth	2007–08	League One	35	3	2	0	0	0	2	2	39	5
AFC Bournemouth	2008–09	League Two	34	6	3	0	1	0	3	0	41	6
AFC Bournemouth	2009–10	League Two	44	1	2	0	1	0	2	0	49	1
AFC Bournemouth	2010–11	League One	14	0	1	0	1	0	1	0	17	0
AFC Bournemouth	Total		127	10	8	0	3	0	8	2	146	12
Career total			510	92	23	6	25	5	15	2	573	105

=== Managerial ===
As of match played 17 March 2026

Managerial record by team and tenure
Team	From	To	Record					Ref.
Team	From	To	P	W	D	L	Win %	Ref.
AFC Bournemouth	16 January 2011	25 March 2012	69	24	20	25	34.78	
Havant & Waterlooville	11 October 2012	22 April 2019	336	151	83	102	44.94	
Eastbourne Borough	7 May 2019	22 October 2019	15	4	5	6	26.67	
Eastleigh	28 February 2022	26 August 2023	70	25	16	29	35.71	
Dagenham & Redbridge	4 June 2025	18 March 2026	41	16	11	14	39.02	
Total			531	220	135	176	41.43	—

== Honours ==
=== As a player ===
Southend United

- Football League One: 2005–06

AFC Bournemouth

- Football League Two second-place promotion: 2009–10

Individual

- Portsmouth Player of the Season: 1996–97

=== As a manager ===
Havant & Waterlooville

- National League South: 2017–18
- Isthmian League Premier Division: 2016–17
- Portsmouth Senior Cup: 2015, 2017, 2018
- Hampshire Senior Cup: 2016, 2018, 2019

Individual

- Conference South Manager of the Month: March 2013
- Isthmian League Manager of the Year: 2016–17
