= James Lawson (footballer) =

English footballer (born 1987)

Personal information
- Full name: James Peter Lawson
- Date of birth: 21 January 1987 (age 39)
- Place of birth: Basildon, England
- Positions: Winger; striker

Youth career
- Southend United

Senior career*
Years	Team	Apps	(Gls)
2004–2007	Southend United	26	(2)
2006	→ Grimsby Town (loan)	1	(0)
2007	→ AFC Bournemouth (loan)	4	(0)
2007	→ Dagenham & Redbridge (loan)	3	(0)
2007	Grays Athletic	9	(0)
2007	→ Chelmsford City (loan)	?	(?)
2008–2009	Chelmsford City	?	(?)
2009–2010	Welling United	?	(?)
2010–2011	Concord Rangers	0	(0)
2010–2011	Billericay Town		
2011–2012	Maldon & Tiptree		
2012–2013	East Thurrock United		
- * Club domestic league appearances and goals as of 16:42, 8 August 2010 (UTC)

James Peter Lawson (born 21 January 1987) is an English former professional footballer who played as a forward.

Lawson made 26 first team appearances in the Football League for Southend United as well as spending time on loan at Grimsby Town and AFC Bournemouth.

== Club career ==
Lawson began his career with Southend United, scoring within 10 minutes on his debut against Oldham Athletic in September 2005. He scored two goals in four starts before suffering a slight injury, and was given his first professional contract until the end of the 2006–07 season. He made 26 league and cup appearances for Southend in the 2005–06 season.

He was unable to establish himself in the first team at the beginning of the 2006–07 season and joined League Two side Grimsby Town in September 2006 on a one-month loan. He made only one appearance as a substitute and was recalled by Southend with manager Steve Tilson explaining, "James was there for two matches and only played about 20 minutes We wanted him to get games and that wasn't happening, so he has come back to us now." Lawson was still unable to break into the first team, being behind Freddy Eastwood, Matt Harrold, Lee Bradbury and Gary Hooper for a place in the team, and joined AFC Bournemouth in January 2007 on a month's loan, where he started two games and came on as substitute in two games. He was then loaned to Dagenham & Redbridge in February 2007 for one-month, where he made three substitute appearances.

Lawson was released by Southend and joined Grays Athletic on a one-year contract in August 2007. He made nine league appearances without scoring for Grays and was transfer listed before joining Isthmian Premier club Chelmsford City on loan in October 2007. The move was made permanent in January 2008. He joined Welling United in June 2009.

At the start of the 2010–11 season, Lawson signed for Isthmian League Premier Division club Concord Rangers.

== Personal life ==
Lawson retired through injury in 2013, he later became a fully qualified electrician- Lawsons Group LTD. He lives in Basildon with his family.

== Honours ==
Southend United

- Football League One: 2005–06
