= 2004–05 Football League Two =

Football League Two
- Season: 2004–05
- Champions: Yeovil Town (1st fourth tier title)
- Direct promotion: Yeovil Town, Scunthorpe United, Swansea City
- Promoted through play-offs: Southend United
- Relegated to Conference: Cambridge United, Kidderminster Harriers
- New club in the league: Chester, Shrewsbury Town
- Matches: 552
- Goals: 1,347 (2.44 per match)
- Top goalscorer: Phil Jevons (Yeovil Town), 27

The 2004–05 Football League Two season was the first season since the Football League Third Division was renamed League Two, following a sponsorship deal with Coca-Cola. The league, consisting of 24 teams and being the 4th tier of English football, was made up of eighteen teams from the Third Division who were neither promoted nor relegated, the four relegated teams from the Second Division, and the two promoted from the Football Conference (all from the 2003–04 season).

== Promotion and relegation ==
=== Relegated from Second Division ===
- Grimsby Town
- Rushden & Diamonds
- Notts County
- Wycombe Wanderers

=== Promoted from Football Conference ===
- Chester City
- Shrewsbury Town

== League table ==
Pos	Team	Pld	W	D	L	GF	GA	GD	Pts	Promotion or relegation
1	Yeovil Town (C, P)	46	25	8	13	90	65	+25	83	Promotion to League One
2	Scunthorpe United (P)	46	22	14	10	69	42	+27	80	Promotion to League One
3	Swansea City (P)	46	24	8	14	62	43	+19	80	Promotion to League One
4	Southend United (O, P)	46	22	12	12	65	46	+19	78	Qualification for League Two play-offs
5	Macclesfield Town	46	22	9	15	60	49	+11	75	Qualification for League Two play-offs
6	Lincoln City	46	20	12	14	64	47	+17	72	Qualification for League Two play-offs
7	Northampton Town	46	20	12	14	62	51	+11	72	Qualification for League Two play-offs
8	Darlington	46	20	12	14	57	49	+8	72	
9	Rochdale	46	16	18	12	54	48	+6	66	
10	Wycombe Wanderers	46	17	14	15	58	52	+6	65	
11	Leyton Orient	46	16	15	15	65	67	−2	63	
12	Bristol Rovers	46	13	21	12	60	57	+3	60	
13	Mansfield Town	46	15	15	16	56	56	0	60	
14	Cheltenham Town	46	16	12	18	51	54	−3	60	
15	Oxford United	46	16	11	19	50	63	−13	59	
16	Boston United	46	14	16	16	62	58	+4	58	
17	Bury	46	14	16	16	54	54	0	58	
18	Grimsby Town	46	14	16	16	51	52	−1	58	
19	Notts County	46	13	13	20	46	62	−16	52	
20	Chester City	46	12	16	18	43	69	−26	52	
21	Shrewsbury Town	46	11	16	19	48	53	−5	49	
22	Rushden & Diamonds	46	10	14	22	42	63	−21	44	
23	Kidderminster Harriers (R)	46	10	8	28	39	85	−46	38	Relegation to Conference National
24	Cambridge United (R)	46	8	16	22	39	62	−23	30 (Note: Cambridge United deducted 10 points for entering administration)	Relegation to Conference National

Updated to match(es) played on 15 September 2009. Source: 2004–05 League Two
Rules for classification: 1) points; 2) goal difference; 3) number of goals scored.
(C) Champions; (O) Play-off winners; (P) Promoted; (R) Relegated

== Play-offs ==
Semi-finals
7	Northampton Town	0	0	0
4	Southend United	0	1	1
6	Lincoln City	1	1	2
5	Macclesfield Town	0	1	1

Final at Millennium Stadium
4	Southend United	2
6	Lincoln City	0

== Top scorers ==
Pos	Player	Team(s)	Goals
1	(England) Phil Jevons	Yeovil	27
2	(Northern Ireland) Andy Kirk	Northampton	26
3	(England) Jon Parkin	Macclesfield	22
3	(England) Lee Trundle	Swansea	22
3	(England) Nathan Tyson	Wycombe	22
6	(Wales) Freddy Eastwood	Southend	21
6	(England) Simon Yeo	Lincoln City	21
8	(Ghana) Junior Agogo	Bristol Rovers	19
9	(England) Paul Hayes	Scunthorpe	17
9	(England) Grant Holt	Rochdale	17
