= Che Wilson =

English footballer (born 1979)

Personal information
- Full name: Che Christian Aaron Clay Wilson
- Date of birth: 17 January 1979 (age 47)
- Place of birth: Ely, England
- Height: 5 ft 11 in (1.80 m)
- Position: Defender

Senior career*
Years	Team	Apps	(Gls)
1996–2000	Norwich City	25	(0)
2000–2002	Bristol Rovers	92	(0)
2003	Cambridge City		
2003–2008	Southend United	137	(8)
2007	→ Brentford (loan)	3	(0)
2007	→ Rotherham United (loan)	6	(0)
2011	Richmond Athletic	6	(3)
Total		269	(11)

Managerial career
- 2009–2013: Cambridge University
- 2013–: University of Bath
- * Club domestic league appearances and goals

Che Christian Aaron Clay Wilson (born 17 January 1979, in Ely) is an English retired professional footballer having played for Norwich City, Bristol Rovers and Southend United.

== Career ==
Wilson, a right footed left back, started his career with Norwich City for whom he made 25 appearances. He joined Bristol Rovers in 2000, where he remained two seasons. In 2002, he joined Cambridge City, where he remained for less than a month before joining Southend United.

After a slow start getting into the squad, Wilson was a permanent place on the Southend team sheet, with some solid displays. He is not well known for his goal scoring, but during the 2005–06 season he put a goal past promotion rivals Brentford in a 4–1 win, and also netted in the 3–0 win against Colchester United at Layer Road. Wilson was at the club since the 2003–04 season, and played in both Football League Trophy finals and the play-off final, making over 100 appearances for the club.

He signed for Brentford in a one-month loan deal on 16 January 2007. He played four games for Brentford before returning to Southend at the end of his one-month loan period. He joined Rotherham United on loan in March 2008.

Wilson was released by Southend United at the end of the 2007–08 season.

== Honours ==
Southend United

- Football League One: 2005–06
- Football League Two play-offs: 2005
- Football League Trophy runner-up: 2003–04, 2004–05
