= 2005 Football League play-offs =

Football League play-offs
- Season: 2004–05
- Champions: West Ham United (Championship); Sheffield Wednesday (League One); Southend United (League Two)
- Matches played: 15
- Goals scored: 29 (1.93 per match)
- Biggest home win: Preston 2–0 Derby (Championship); Hartlepool 2–0 Tranmere (League One); Tranmere 2–0 Hartlepool (League One)
- Biggest away win: Ipswich 0–2 West Ham (Championship)
- Highest scoring: Hartlepool 2–4 Sheffield Wednesday (6 goals)
- Highest attendance: 70,275 – Preston v West Ham (Championship final)
- Lowest attendance: 5,223 – Macclesfield v Lincoln (League Two semi-final)
- Average attendance: 23,500

The Football League play-offs for the 2004–05 season were held in May 2005, with the finals taking place at Millennium Stadium in Cardiff. The play-off semi-finals were played over two legs and were contested by the teams who finished in 3rd, 4th, 5th and 6th place in the Football League Championship and League One and the 4th, 5th, 6th and 7th placed teams in the League Two table. The winners of the semi-finals progressed to the finals, with the winner of the matches gaining promotion for the following season.

== Background ==
The Football League play-offs have been held every year since 1987. They take place for each division following the conclusion of the regular season and are contested by the four clubs finishing below the automatic promotion places.

In the Championship, Ipswich Town, who were aiming to return to the top flight for the first time since 2002, finished 2 points behind second placed Wigan Athletic, who in turn finished 7 points behind champions Sunderland, who returned to the top flight at the second attempt after relegation from the Premier League in 2003. Derby County who were also relegated along with Ipswich from the top flight in 2002, finished in fourth place in the table. Preston North End who have not been in the top flight since 1961, finished in fifth place. West Ham United finished 2 points behind Preston North End and were looking for a place back in the Premiership after 2 seasons outside the top division.

== Championship ==
Pos	Team	Pld	W	D	L	GF	GA	GD	Pts
3	Ipswich Town	46	24	13	9	85	56	+29	85
4	Derby County	46	22	10	14	71	60	+11	76
5	Preston North End	46	21	12	13	67	58	+9	75
6	West Ham United	46	21	10	15	66	56	+10	73

=== Semi-finals ===
First leg

14 May 2005
12:15

West Ham United	2–2	Ipswich Town
Harewood 7'; Zamora 13'	Report	Walker 45' (o.g.); Kuqi 74'

Upton Park, London
Attendance: 33,723
Referee: Uriah Rennie

15 May 2005
12:00

Preston North End	2–0	Derby County
Nugent 38'; Cresswell 90'	Report

Deepdale, Preston
Attendance: 20,315
Referee: Andre Marriner

Second leg

18 May 2005
19:45

Ipswich Town	0–2	West Ham United
	Report	Zamora 61', 72'

Portman Road, Ipswich
Attendance: 30,010
Referee: Steve Dunn

West Ham United won 4–2 on aggregate.

19 May 2005
19:45

Derby County	0–0	Preston North End
	Report

Pride Park, Derby
Attendance: 31,310
Referee: Richard Beeby

Preston North End won 2–0 on aggregate.

=== Final ===
30 May 2005
15:00

Preston North End	0–1	West Ham United
	Report	Zamora 57'

Millennium Stadium, Cardiff
Attendance: 70,275
Referee: Mike Riley

== League One ==
Pos	Team	Pld	W	D	L	GF	GA	GD	Pts
3	Tranmere Rovers	46	22	13	11	73	55	+18	79
4	Brentford	46	22	9	15	57	60	-3	75
5	Sheffield Wednesday	46	19	15	12	77	59	+18	72
6	Hartlepool United	46	21	8	17	76	66	+10	71

=== Semi-finals ===
First leg

12 May 2005
19:45

Sheffield Wednesday	1–0	Brentford
McGovern 12'	Report

Hillsborough, Sheffield
Attendance: 28,625
Referee: Mike Jones

13 May 2005
19:45

Hartlepool United	2–0	Tranmere Rovers
Boyd 32', 68'	Report

Victoria Park, Hartlepool
Attendance: 6,604
Referee: Brian Curson

Second leg

16 May 2005
19:45

Brentford	1–2	Sheffield Wednesday
Frampton 87'	Report	Peacock 27'; Brunt 53'

Griffin Park, Brentford
Attendance: 10,823
Referee: Tony Leake

Sheffield Wednesday won 3–1 on aggregate.

17 May 2005
19:45

Tranmere Rovers	2–0 (a.e.t.)	Hartlepool United
Taylor 70'; Beresford 87'	Report
Penalties
Taylor (penalty missed); Hall (penalty scored); Roberts (penalty scored); Hume (penalty scored); Dagnall (penalty scored); Beresford (penalty scored); Sharps (penalty missed)	5–6	(penalty scored) Strachan; (penalty missed) Tinkler; (penalty scored) Porter; (penalty scored) Robson; (penalty scored) Westwood; (penalty scored) Sweeney; (penalty scored) Humphreys

Prenton Park, Birkenhead
Attendance: 13,356
Referee: Martin Atkinson

Tranmere Rovers 2–2 Hartlepool United on aggregate. Hartlepool United won 6–5 on penalties.

=== Final ===
29 May 2005
15:00

Hartlepool United	2–4 (a.e.t.)	Sheffield Wednesday
Williams 47'; Daly 71'	Report	McGovern 45'; MacLean 82' (pen.); Whelan 94'; Talbot 120'

Millennium Stadium, Cardiff
Attendance: 59,808
Referee: Phil Crossley

== League Two ==
Pos	Team	Pld	W	D	L	GF	GA	GD	Pts
4	Southend United	46	22	12	12	65	46	+19	78
5	Macclesfield Town	46	22	9	15	60	49	+11	75
6	Lincoln City	46	20	12	14	64	47	+17	72
7	Northampton Town	46	20	12	14	62	51	+11	72

=== Semi-finals ===
First leg

14 May 2005
17:15

Lincoln City	1–0	Macclesfield Town
McAuley 11'	Report

Sincil Bank, Lincoln
Attendance: 7,032
Referee: Graham Laws

15 May 2005
17:15

Northampton Town	0–0	Southend United
	Report

Sixfields Stadium, Northampton
Attendance: 6,601
Referee: Lee Mason

Second leg

21 May 2005
12:05

Macclesfield Town	1–1	Lincoln City
Harsley 76'	Report	McAuley 15'

Moss Rose, Macclesfield
Attendance: 5,223
Referee: Phil Crossley

Lincoln City won 2–1 on aggregate.

21 May 2005
18:15

Southend United	1–0	Northampton Town
Eastwood 49' (pen.)	Report

Roots Hall, Southend
Attendance: 9,152
Referee: Barry Knight

Southend United won 1–0 on aggregate.

=== Final ===
28 May 2005
15:00

Lincoln City	0–2 (a.e.t.)	Southend United
	Report	Eastwood 105'; Jupp 110'

Millennium Stadium, Cardiff
Attendance: 19,653
Referee: Martin Atkinson
