= Freddy Eastwood =

English footballer (born 1983)

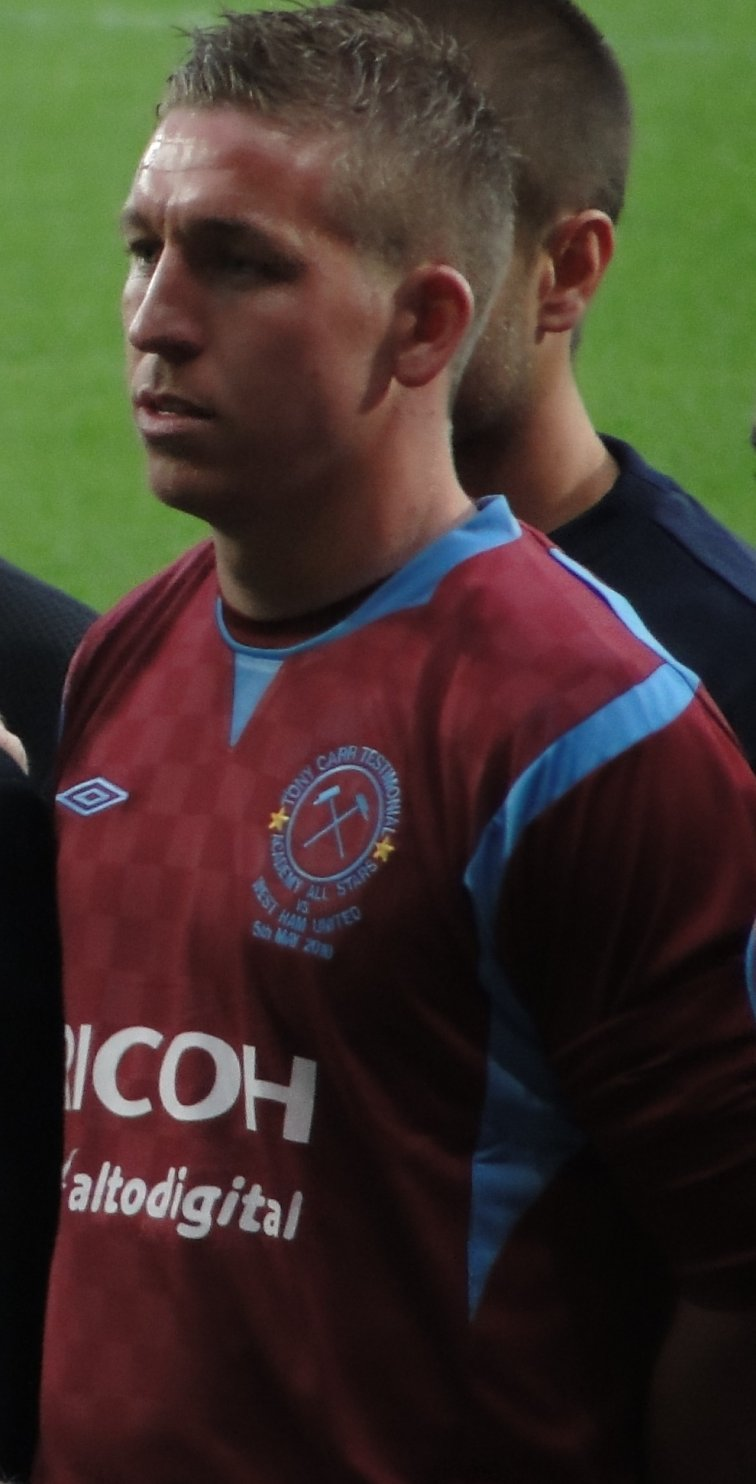
- Eastwood at the Boleyn Ground, 2010

Personal information
- Full name: Freddy Eastwood
- Date of birth: 29 October 1983 (age 42)
- Place of birth: Epsom, England
- Height: 5 ft 11 in (1.80 m)
- Position: Forward

Youth career
- 1997–1999: Southend United
- 1999–2002: West Ham United

Senior career*
Years	Team	Apps	(Gls)
2002–2003	West Ham United	0	(0)
2003–2004	Grays Athletic	55	(34)
2004	→ Southend United (loan)	4	(4)
2004–2007	Southend United	111	(49)
2007–2008	Wolverhampton Wanderers	31	(3)
2008–2012	Coventry City	113	(17)
2012	→ Southend United (loan)	7	(2)
2012–2014	Southend United	57	(9)
Total		378	(118)

International career
2007–2011	Wales	11	(4)
- * Club domestic league appearances and goals

Freddy Eastwood (born 29 October 1983) is a former professional footballer. He started his career with West Ham United and also played for Southend United, Grays Athletic, Wolverhampton Wanderers and Coventry City. He played eleven times in his international career for Wales.

== Club career ==
=== West Ham United ===
Eastwood began his career as a West Ham United Academy player after turning down a scholarship offer at Southend where he had been a promising youth player. At West Ham, Eastwood played in the same youth team as Jermain Defoe, Anton Ferdinand, and Glen Johnson but was not considered good enough by manager Glenn Roeder and was released by the Hammers in May 2003. After being released, he considered quitting football altogether and worked briefly as a car salesman.

=== Grays Athletic ===
Eastwood joined Conference South side Grays Athletic in August 2003. He scored 37 league and cup goals in his first season, winning the Grays' Golden Boot and prompting attention from a number of professional clubs including Northampton Town, Swindon Town and Charlton Athletic as well as Southend United.

=== Southend United ===
Eastwood joined Southend United in October 2004, initially on loan. On his debut, he scored the opener after 7.7 seconds, an English league record for a debut, and went on to score two more to record his first of three hat-tricks for the club as Southend beat top-of-the-table Swansea City 4–2. Eastwood joined Southend on a permanent basis in November 2004 for an undisclosed fee in a three-year deal from Grays. He finished the 2004–05 season with 24 goals from 42 appearances in all competitions and scored the opening goal in his club's 2–0 win over Lincoln City in the League Two Play-off Final at the Millennium Stadium in Cardiff in May 2005 that resulted in promotion for Southend United.

Eastwood scored Southend United's 5,000th League goal on 2 January 2006 when he smashed home the late winner against Blackpool at Bloomfield Road as the Shrimpers went to the top of League One. He scored twice at Swansea City on 29 April 2006 to earn Southend United a 2–2 draw, a result which sealed promotion to the Football League Championship. By the end of the 2005–06 season, Eastwood was joint 18th in Southend's all-time leading goalscorers list with 49 goals, 45 of which were in the league, two in the FA Cup and two in the Football League Trophy. He was also joint top scorer with Billy Sharp in League One in 2005–06 with 23 goals.

The following season, Eastwood scored his 50th goal for the club in the Championship opener game against Stoke City. It would prove to be a difficult season for the striker and despite scoring 11 goal in the Championship, Eastwood was unable to prevent relegation back to League One, however the highlight of the Shrimpers season came when Eastwood scored the only goal, a spectacular 30-yard free kick in front of the away fans in the North Stand, during the Football League Cup fourth round win against Manchester United on 7 November 2006 to put the holders out of the competition.

=== Wolverhampton Wanderers ===
Eastwood signed a four-year deal with Wolverhampton Wanderers in July 2007 after completing a £1.5m move from Southend. The striker started the 2007–08 season impressively, scoring his first goal for Wolves on his full debut in the League Cup first round win over Bradford City, and finishing the month with 4 goals to his name, earning him the Championship Player of the Month Award for August. However, his goals dried up in the following months and he was often on the substitutes' bench or left out of the squad completely, with Andy Keogh, Jay Bothroyd, Kevin Kyle and Sylvan Ebanks-Blake now ahead of him in the pecking order.

He was close to a move away from Molineux to Coventry City in March 2008, but this collapsed at the last minute. He remained popular with many Wolves fans, who believed he had not been given a fair run of games, which caused a split between the fans towards the end of the season. He finished the campaign with just 3 goals in 10 league starts (35 appearances in total), prompting him to leave the club, with manager Mick McCarthy explaining, "It's nothing personal, but it hasn't worked out how either of us would have liked. He hasn't fitted into my team but he wants to play and will do well elsewhere. We wish him luck."

=== Coventry City ===
In July 2008, he joined fellow Championship club Coventry City in a four-year deal for a reported £1.2 million fee.

Eastwood made his Coventry City debut against Norwich City on 9 August 2008, Coventry won the game 2–0. Eastwood scored his first goal for the Sky Blues a week later against Barnsley in a 2–1 win for Coventry. Goals against Blackpool, Ipswich Town and Watford followed but it was to be another frustrating season in front of goal for the striker who towards the latter stage of the campaign was used in a left midfield role.

On 31 October 2009 he scored a hat-trick against Peterborough where the game finished 3–2. He was the first player to score a hat-trick at the Ricoh Arena. Eastwood was released by Coventry City when his contract ran out at the end of the 2011/2012 season.

=== Return to Southend ===
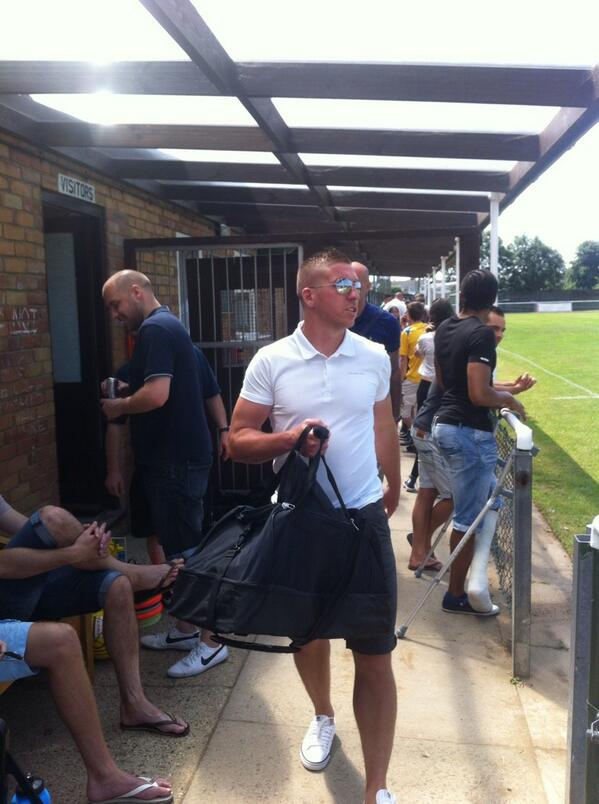
Freddy Eastwood arriving at Burroughs Park ahead of Southend United's pre-season friendly against Great Wakering Rovers in 2013.

On 22 March 2012, Eastwood returned on loan to his former club Southend United until the end of the 2011–12 season. He made his second Southend debut on 24 March 2012 in a 1–0 defeat against Bristol Rovers at the Memorial Ground. He scored his first Southend United goal since his return in his second appearance in Southend 4–0 win against Cheltenham Town on 30 March 2012. At the end of the 2011–12 season Eastwood underwent surgery on a troublesome knee problem.

On 12 July 2012, Eastwood signed a two-year contract to stay at Southend, following his release from relegated Coventry City. On 22 September 2012, Eastwood scored his first goal since his permanent return to Southend when he headed in from close range to score the winner in a 2–1 triumph over Exeter City.

Eastwood returned for the start of pre-season training ahead of the 2013–14 season, looking thinner and sharper and started the season in his best form since 2005 after scoring 4 goals in consecutive games and claimed he was feeling as confident now as he was in his first spell with the club. Manager Phil Brown, claimed Eastwood was in the form of his career.

Eastwood spent much of the 2013-2014 season as a squad player, playing in 30 League games, 19 as substitute. On 23 May 2014, Southend announced that Eastwood's contract was not to be renewed bringing an end to an association with Southend that brought 77 goals over two spells. The club in a statement said that Eastwood was a 'Southend legend'.

== International career ==
His paternal grandmother was born in Wales, so Eastwood was eligible to play in the Welsh national team. He was selected for the squad for the international friendly against New Zealand in May 2007 and the crucial Euro 2008 qualifier against Czech Republic in June, however an existing back injury did not heal as quickly as hoped and Eastwood was forced to withdraw from the squad.

He was selected for the squad to play Bulgaria and went on to score his debut international goal in the first half of their 1–0 victory on 22 August 2007. John Toshack, the Wales manager, said, "It was a really special goal [...] Now we have got a player up front who knows his business. We have been aware of his goalscoring exploits and have worked hard to make sure he became a Wales international."

Despite being out of favour at Wolves during the 2007–08 season, Eastwood was selected for Wales and scored both goals in a 2–0 win over Luxembourg in March 2008. He has scored four goals in ten international appearances. His final appearance for Wales came in February 2011 in Wales' Nations Cup match with Republic of Ireland at the Aviva Stadium in Dublin.

== Personal life ==
Eastwood was born to a Romanichal family in Epsom, Surrey and was often seen exercising his horse on the A127 road in Essex on the morning of a match day when playing for Southend United.

He appealed to the British Government in August 2006 to keep his home on a travellers' site in Basildon after Basildon Council refused planning permission. Eastwood and his family were told in November 2006 that the decision of Basildon Council would not be upheld by the Government and he was free to stay there for at least the next five years.

Eastwood was fined by magistrates in July 2009, after he had been caught fly-tipping rubbish which included an electricity bill and bank statements containing his name.

Eastwood's son, also named Freddy, formerly played in Southend United's youth academy.

== Career statistics ==
=== International ===
Appearances and goals by national team and year
National team	Year	Apps	Goals
Wales	2007	5	2
Wales	2008	5	2
Wales	2011	1	0
Total		11	4

Wales' score listed first, score column indicates score after each Eastwood goal.

List of international goals scored by Freddy Eastwood
No.	Date	Venue	Cap	Opponent	Score	Result	Competition
1	22 August 2007	Lazur Stadium, Burgas, Bulgaria	1	Bulgaria	1–0	1–0	Friendly
2	12 September 2007	Štadión Antona Malatinského, Trnava, Slovakia	3	Slovakia	1–1	5–2	UEFA Euro 2008 qualification
3	26 March 2008	Stade Josy Barthel, Luxembourg City, Luxembourg	7	Luxembourg	1–0	2–0	Friendly
4	26 March 2008	Stade Josy Barthel, Luxembourg City, Luxembourg	7	Luxembourg	2–0	2–0	Friendly

== Honours ==
Southend United

- Football League One: 2005–06
- Football League Two play-offs: 2005
- Football League Trophy runner-up: 2004–05, 2012–13
