= 2002–03 Southend United F.C. season =

Southend United
2002–03 season
- Manager: Rob Newman, Stewart Robson, Steve Wignall
- Football League Third Division: 17th
- FA Cup: Second round
- League Cup: First round
- League Trophy: First round
- Top goalscorer: Tesfaye Bramble & Mark Rawle (9)

The 2002–03 season saw Southend United's compete in the Football League Third Division.

== Final league table ==
Pos	Team	Pld	W	D	L	GF	GA	GD	Pts
15	Boston United	46	15	13	18	55	56	−1	54 (Note: Boston United had 4 points deducted for financial irregularities.)
16	Macclesfield Town	46	14	12	20	57	63	−6	54
17	Southend United	46	17	3	26	47	59	−12	54
18	Leyton Orient	46	14	11	21	51	61	−10	53
19	Rochdale	46	12	16	18	63	70	−7	52

Rules for classification: In the Football League goals scored (GF) takes precedence over goal difference (GD).

== Results ==
=== Legend ===
Win	Draw	Loss

=== Football League Third Division ===
Match	Date	Opponent	Venue	Result	Attendance	Scorers
1	10 August 2002	Hull City	A	2–2	10,449	Jenkins 62', Bramble 90'
2	13 August 2002	Carlisle United	H	0–1	3,881	
3	17 August 2002	Shrewsbury Town	H	2–3	3,150	Jenkins 9', Bramble 81' (pen)
4	24 August 2002	Oxford United	A	1–0	5,162	Rawle 20'
5	26 August 2002	Cambridge United	H	2–1	4,462	Broad 7', Smith 30'
6	31 August 2002	Rochdale	A	2–1	2,852	Rawle 36', Bramble 83'
7	7 September 2002	Rushden & Diamonds	A	0–3	4,176	
8	14 September 2002	Macclesfield Town	H	1–0	3,249	Cort 26'
9	17 September 2002	Kidderminster Harriers	H	0–2	2,959	
10	21 September 2002	Lincoln City	A	1–2	3,151	Jenkins 76'
11	28 September 2002	Exeter City	H	1–0	3,364	Jones 43'
12	28 September 2002	Bury	A	3–1	3,301	Jones 67', Jenkins 79', Bramble 84'
13	12 October 2002	York City	H	1–0	4,411	Belgrave 90'
14	19 October 2002	Swansea City	A	0–1	3,623	
15	25 October 2002	Hartlepool United	A	0–1	5,168	
16	29 October 2002	Leyton Orient	A	1–2	5,343	Belgrave 73'
17	2 November 2002	Wrexham	H	0–1	3,727	
18	9 November 2002	Bristol Rovers	A	1–0	5,691	Bramble 78'
19	23 November 2002	Bournemouth	H	0–1	4,221	
20	30 November 2002	Darlington	A	1–2	2,820	Bramble 90'
21	14 December 2002	Boston United	H	4–2	3,245	Cort (3) 7' 23', 88', Rawle 39'
22	21 December 2002	Torquay United	A	1–3	2,244	Bramble 60'
23	26 December 2002	Cambridge United	A	1–1	6,237	Rawle 10'
24	29 December 2002	Scunthorpe United	H	1–2	4,248	Cort 39'
25	4 January 2003	Carlisle United	A	0–1	4,016	
26	14 January 2003	Shrewsbury Town	A	1–0	2,699	Smith 20'
27	18 January 2003	Rochdale	H	1–0	3,645	Bramble 89'
28	21 January 2003	Oxford United	H	2–1	3,203	Rawle 45', Bramble 70'
29	25 January 2003	Scunthorpe United	A	1–4	3,096	Smith 17'
30	1 February 2003	Hull City	H	3–0	4,534	Smith (2) 22', 45', Rawle 41'
31	8 February 2003	Bristol Rovers	H	2–2	4,708	Belgrave 36', Maher 76'
32	15 February 2003	Wrexham	A	0–3	3,109	
33	22 February 2003	Rushden & Diamonds	A	2–1	6,453	Rawle 4', Searle 6'
34	1 March 2003	Macclesfield Town	A	1–2	1,917	Rawle 4', Searle 6'
35	4 March 2003	Kidderminster Harriers	A	0–1	2,006	
36	8 March 2003	Lincoln City	H	0–1	3,912	
37	15 March 2003	Hartlepool United	A	1–2	4,868	Sutch 74'
38	18 March 2003	Swansea City	H	0–2	2,832	
39	22 March 2003	Leyton Orient	H	1–0	4,148	Salter 5'
40	29 March 2003	York City	A	0–2	4,312	
41	5 April 2003	Darlington	H	2–0	3,053	Maher 40', Jenkins 42'
42	12 April 2003	Bournemouth	A	0–1	6,767	
43	19 April 2003	Torquay United	H	3–0	3,594	Rawle (2) 2', 40', Jenkins 88'
44	21 April 2003	Boston United	A	0–1	3,247	
45	26 April 2003	Bury	A	1–2	4,707	Cort 13'
46	3 May 2003	Exeter City	A	0–1	9,036	

=== FA Cup ===
Round	Date	Opponent	Venue	Result	Attendance	Scorers
R1	16 November 2002	Hartlepool United	H	1–1	4,984	Lee (o.g.) 3'
R1 Replay	26 November 2002	Hartlepool United	A	2–1	4,080	Bramble 88', Cort 89'
R2	7 December 2002	Bournemouth	H	1–1	5,721	Rawle 53'
R2 Replay	17 December 2002	Bournemouth	A	2–3	5,456	Bramble 42', Rawle 45'

=== League Cup ===
Round	Date	Opponent	Venue	Result	Attendance	Scorers
R1	10 September 2002	Wimbledon	H	1–4	2,634	Rawle 82'

=== League Trophy ===
Round	Date	Opponent	Venue	Result	Attendance	Scorers
R1	22 October 2002	Swindon Town	A	1–6	1,747	Jones 23'

== Squad statistics ==
No.	Pos.	Name	League		FA Cup		League Cup		League Trophy		Total	
No.	Pos.	Name	Apps	Goals	Apps	Goals	Apps	Goals	Apps	Goals	Apps	Goals
1	GK	(England) Darryl Flahavan	41	0	4	0	1	0	1	0	47	0
2	DF	(England) Stephen Broad	17	1	0	0	1	0	0	0	18	0
3	DF	(Wales) Damon Searle	39(5)	1	4	0	1	0	1	0	45(5)	1
4	DF	(England) Leon Cort	46	6	4	1	1	0	1	0	52	7
5	DF	(England) Phil Whelan	13(1)	0	0	0	0(1)	0	1	0	14(2)	0
6	DF	(England) Dave McSweeney	15(2)	0	4	0	0	0	0(1)	0	19(3)	0
7	MF	(England) Stuart Thurgood	7(20)	0	1(1)	0	0	0	1	0	9(22)	0
8	MF	(England) Kevin Maher	42	2	4	0	1	0	0	0	46	2
9	FW	(Montserrat) Tesfaye Bramble	31(3)	9	4	2	1	0	0	0	36(3)	10
10	FW	(England) Barrington Belgrave	6(15)	3	1	0	0	0	1	0	8(15)	3
11	MF	(England) Mark Rawle	33(1)	9	3	2	1	1	0	0	37(1)	12
12	MF	(England) Steven Clark	20(13)	0	1(3)	0	0(1)	0	1	0	22(17)	0
13	GK	(England) Danny Gay	5	0	0	0	0	0	0	0	5	0
14	MF	(England) Danny Maye	0(2)	0	0	0	0	0	0	0	0(2)	0
15	DF	(England) Mark Beard	29(7)	0	4	0	1	0	0(1)	0	34(8)	0
16	MF	(England) Steve Tilson	2(1)	0	0(2)	0	0	0	1	0	3(3)	0
17	MF	(Scotland) Gavin Strachan	6(1)	0	0	0	0	0	0	0	6(1)	0
17	FW	(England) Dan Marney	13(4)	0	0	0	0	0	0	0	13(4)	0
18	DF	(England) Daryl Sutch	16	1	0	0	0	0	0	0	16	1
18	MF	(England) Ian Selley	11	0	0	0	0	0	0	0	11	0
19	DF	(England) Neil Jenkins	29(5)	7	1(1)	0	1	0	0	0	31(6)	7
20	DF	(England) Ronnie Henry	3	0	0	0	0	0	0	0	3	0
20	FW	(England) Graeme Jones	18(3)	2	2(1)	0	1	0	1	1	22(4)	3
21	DF	(England) Rob Newman	0	0	0	0	0	0	0	0	0	0
22	MF	(England) Jay Smith	30(1)	5	3(1)	0	1	0	1	0	35(2)	5
23	DF	(England) Tom Jordan	0(1)	0	0	0	0	0	1	0	1(1)	0
24	FW	(England) Mark Salter	5(8)	1	0	0	0	0	0(1)	0	5(9)	1
25	MF	(Republic of Ireland) Tony Scully	8	0	4	0	0	0	0	0	12	0
25	DF	(Republic of Ireland) Stephen Kelly	10	0	0	0	0	0	0	0	10	0
26	MF	(England) Brett Darby	6(4)	0	0	0	0	0	0	0	6(4)	0
26	FW	(Republic of Ireland) Dominic Foley	5	0	0	0	0	0	0	0	5	0
27	MF	(England) Michael Kightly	0(1)	0	0	0	0	0	0	0	0(1)	0
