= 2004 Football League Trophy final =

2004 Football League Trophy Final
- Event: 2003–04 Football League Trophy
Blackpool	Southend United
2	0
- Date: 21 March 2004
- Venue: Millennium Stadium, Cardiff
- Referee: Roy Pearson (Peterlee)
- Attendance: 34,031

The 2004 Football League Trophy Final was the 21st final of the domestic football cup competition for teams from Football Leagues One, Two and The Conference, the Football League Trophy. The final was played at Millennium Stadium in Cardiff on 21 March 2004. The match was contested between Blackpool and Southend United. Blackpool won the match 2–0 with goals from John Murphy and Danny Coid.

== Match details ==
21 March 2004
13:00 BST

Blackpool	2–0	Southend United
Murphy 2'; Coid 55'	Report

Millennium Stadium, Cardiff
Attendance: 34,031
Referee: Roy Pearson (Peterlee)

Blackpool	Southend United

GK	13	Lee Jones
RB	12	Danny Coid
CB	23	Steve Elliott
CB	6	Mike Flynn
LB	3	Tommy Jaszczun (yellow card)
DM	11	Martin Bullock	(substituted off) 90'
CM	2	Simon Grayson
CM	22	Tony Dinning
AM	7	Richie Wellens	(substituted off) 90'
FW	8	Mike Sheron	(substituted off) 73'
FW	9	John Murphy
Substitutes:
GK	1	Phil Barnes
DF	14	Leam Richardson	(substituted on) 90'
DF	21	Steve Davis
MF	18	Steve McMahon, Jr.	(substituted on) 90'
FW	17	Matthew Blinkhorn	(substituted on) 73'
Manager:
Steve McMahon

GK	30	Darryl Flahavan
RB	2	Duncan Jupp
CB	23	Lewis Hunt
CB	4	Leon Cort
CB	5	Mark Warren
LB	14	Che Wilson	(substituted off) 63'
CM	28	Carl Pettefer
CM	7	Mark Gower	(substituted off) 85'
CM	8	Kevin Maher (yellow card)
CF	10	Drewe Broughton
CF	24	Leon Constantine
Substitutes:
GK	1	Carl Emberson
DF	3	Jamie Stuart
DF	6	Dave McSweeney
MF	19	Neil Jenkins	(substituted on) 85'
FW	9	Tesfaye Bramble	(substituted on) 63'
Manager:
Steve Tilson

MATCH RULES

- 90 minutes.
- Penalty shoot-out if scores still level.
- Five named substitutes
- Maximum of 3 substitutions.
