= History of Southend United F.C. =

History of an English football club

Southend United F.C. is a professional football club formed in 1906 and based in Southend-on-Sea. Initially playing in the Southern League, the club joined the Football League in 1920 and then competed in the third tier of English football for most subsequent seasons. The side reached the second tier Championship level in the 1990s and again in the early 2000s, but by 2009 the club had major financial difficulties and narrowly avoided administration on several occasions. The financial problems continued through to the early 2020s, during which it was relegated from the Football League to the fifth tier National League, with the club subject to numerous winding-up petitions before it was sold to its current owners in 2024.

== 1906–1958 ==
Prior to the formation of United, football in the town had been played by amateur teams, with the strongest being Southend Athletic. There was a strong clamour for the town to have a professional club, and at Athletic's AGM on the 16 May 1906, club president Robert Jones put forward the idea of going semi-professional which was rejected.

Chart of table positions of Southend in the League.

Southend United F.C. was founded on 19 May 1906 in the Blue Boar Hotel after landlord Oliver Trigg invited a group of footballers and businessmen to discuss setting up a new professional club. (Note: When the club was incorporated on 1 August 1906, Trigg was among the club's initial five directors, listed as proprietor of the Blue Boar Hotel; others were a licensed victualler (Frederick England, of the Nelson Hotel in Prittlewell), a London stock-broker (Charles Albert Stein), an agent (George Hutton Hogsflesh), and a merchant and cigar importer (Tom Stuart Tidy).) A prospectus for shares in the club issued in August 1906 noted the club had been elected to complete in the Second Division of the Southern League and in the South Eastern League, and a seven-year lease had been agreed to play at Roots Hall Field in Prittlewell. Robert Jack ("late of Plymouth Argyle Football Club") was appointed as manager, secretary and player, and 12 professional players were recruited, including two - outside left Alfred Ernest Watkins (formerly at Millwall) and back George Molyneux (formerly at Portsmouth) - listed as internationals (Watkins had played for Wales, Molyneux for England). (Note: As well as the initial five directors, the prospectus listed three additional shareholders: Andrew Ducat, a builder, Archibald Howard, a canvasser, and John Holton, a chartered accountant.) Other signings included goalkeeper Charles Cotton from West Ham, outside right Arthur Holden from Portsmouth, and centre-forward Harold Halse from Wanstead, plus players from Southend Athletic, Grays United, South Weald and Leigh Ramblers.

In their first season under Jack's management, Southend won the Southern League Second Division title for 1906–07, then repeated the feat the following season, gaining election to the Southern League First Division in 1908. When Jack left Southend in 1910, he was succeeded as player-manager by Molyneux. Southend were relegated back to the Second Division after the 1910–11 season, but returned to the First Division two seasons later.

The club remained in the Southern League until the first post-World War I season of 1919–20. The club then joined the Football League's new Third Division and finished 17th in their first season. In 1921, the Third Division was regionalised with Southend United joining the southern section and here they remained until the league re-structured in 1958. Southend came close to promotion twice when they finished 3rd in 1932 and 1950, the club's highest league positions until 1991.

=== 1958–1981 ===
Southend United joined the new national Third Division in 1958, where they remained until 1966 when they suffered their first relegation, into the Fourth Division. The club had to wait six seasons until 1972 to experience the club's first Football League promotion, as runners-up behind Grimsby Town. In 1976 Southend suffered relegation again before taking another runners-up spot behind Watford in 1978. Another relegation in 1980 was directly followed by one of the most successful seasons in the club's history as they won the Fourth Division Championship in 1981, breaking a series of club records in the process. Despite success on the pitch and low admission prices, the club's gates were low and condemned as "a bad reflection on the town".

== 1981–1987 ==
Many of Southend United's most gifted players were sold due to a financial strain. In June 1983 Anton Johnson, a local butcher who was also chairman of Rotherham United, bought 44.9% of the club from the Rubin brothers. The club was already £250,000 in debt. By August 1983 Dave Smith had been replaced as manager by Peter Morris who lasted until February 1984. On his arrival, Morris discovered that he had a squad of only ten players. Bobby Moore was installed as chief executive with Andrew MacHutcheon as chairman. The club were relegated into the Fourth Division in 1984 with Bobby Moore as manager. One of the club's darkest hours saw a season average attendance of barely above 2,000. Vic Jobson was elected as a director in the 1984 close-season, only to be forced out, along with MacHutcheon, months later. On the pitch, the team finished in 20th place, narrowly avoiding the need to seek re-election to the Football League.

Johnson was arrested on 23 October 1984. Two weeks before Christmas, fans discovered that £70,000 of the club's Christmas savings scheme had gone missing. While the fraud squad investigated, Robert Maxwell and Ken Bates stepped in, at Jobson's request, to lend the necessary money to the club to repay its Christmas savers. The club was now over £800,000 in debt. Johnson was banned by the FA from any future involvement in football, having simultaneously been in control of Southend, Rotherham and Bournemouth. Johnson was cleared of all charges at Chelmsford Crown Court and has never received the monies he personally invested in the misplaced Christmas fund and lost his shares in a further court case to the SUFC board. Over a decade later, Ceefax reported that Johnson was seeking to take over Doncaster Rovers.

== 1987–1992 ==
Promotion in 1987 was the beginning of a golden era for Southend United. Relegation in 1989 was a mere blip as two successive promotions in 1990 and 1991 saw Southend United become "full members" of the Football League for the first time in the club's history, and in 1992 Southend United finished 12th in the old Second Division, their highest ever position in the Football League to date. On New Year's Day, 1992, the club briefly topped the Second Division but their dreary late season form stopped any hopes of a unique third successive promotion that would have given them a place as a Premier League founder member. Manager David Webb then stepped down.

== 1992–2003 ==
Southend United were managed by Colin Murphy, Barry Fry and then Peter Taylor over the next three seasons. In 1995, former Liverpool player Ronnie Whelan agreed to become player-manager, and Southend finished 14th in Division One in his first season as a manager, a year later the club suffered relegation after finishing bottom of Division One. Ronnie Whelan left the club, claiming a lack of support from the fans and a lack of money from the chairman. Subsequently, Whelan won a case for wrongful dismissal.

Alvin Martin was named Whelan's replacement. Martin was unable to avoid a second consecutive relegation which Southend once again finishing bottom of the table and were duly relegated to Division Three. First team regulars Simon Royce, Jeroen Boere, Andy Thomson and Andy Rammell all left the club and were replaced by Martyn Margetson, Mark Beard, Mark Stimson and Rob Newman. Alvin Martin left in April 1999, with Southend fifth from bottom in the Football League.

Alan Little took charge of his first game away to Leyton Orient, a game Southend lost 3–0. Alan Little, who had previously managed York City, signed former York City players Mark Tinkler and Martin Curruthers. With limited success gates were barely getting above the 3,000 mark and a crowd of only 2,403 showed up to watch the game against Kidderminster and Alan Little's reign had come to an end.

David Webb left Yeovil Town and was appointed the new manager, signing players Darryl Flahavan, Leon Cort, Tes Bramble and Mark Rawle. During the season David Webb became ill and Rob Newman took temporary charge, being appointed permanently when Webb quit the club. Southend suffered straight defeats to Lincoln, Swansea, Kidderminster and Hartlepool, and Newman was dismissed shortly after. Steve Wignall took over as manager and signed Drewe Broughton, Mark Gower, Mark Warren and Che Wilson. He released goalkeeper Darryl Flahavan after he deemed him too small to play in the League, but re-signed him after a poor run of results. Two more defeats followed and Wignall was sacked. In late 2003 former Southend United midfielder Steve Tilson was appointed manager and named former Leyton Orient boss Paul Brush as his assistant.

During this period, Martin Dawn PLC and Delancey Estates, together forming South Eastern Leisure (SEL), had taken control of Southend United in November 1998, buying the club and its centrally located Roots Hall ground for £4m from then chairman Vic Jobson, who at the time owned 55% of the issued share capital of the club. Jobson had previously sold part of the ground's South Bank for housing, and SEL's plan was to continue the redevelopment and move the club to a proposed 16,000-seat stadium in a leisure redevelopment in the northern part of Southend.

== 2003–2005 ==
Southend reached their first ever national cup final in 2004 when they met Blackpool in the final of the LDV Vans Trophy at the Millennium Stadium in Cardiff. Over 20,000 Southend fans travelled, but the team did not rise to the occasion and Blackpool won 2–0.

In 2004 Tilson and Brush were installed as a permanent management / coaching duo and led Southend to promotion to League One in 2005, while making a second successive appearance in the Football League Trophy final, which the Shrimpers lost 2–0 to Wrexham, but the third appearance at the Millennium Stadium in the League Two play-off final against Lincoln City brought success as Freddy Eastwood and Duncan Jupp scored the goals that gave the club their first ever taste of promotion via the play-off system and their first major piece of silverware since 1981.

== 2006–2010 ==
On 29 April 2006, the Shrimpers were promoted to the Football League Championship after a 2–2 draw with Swansea City at the Welsh club's new Liberty Stadium. Southend were crowned League One champions on 6 May 2006 after beating Bristol City 1–0 at Roots Hall in front of over 11,000 fans. This was the last professional appearance of Shaun Goater; fans from his former club Manchester City came to give him a special send-off at the end of a long and distinguished career. For Southend United, the title was the club's first in 25 years. On 6 May 2006, Tilson was named as the League Manager Association's Manager-of-the-Season for League One.

=== 2006 League Cup win over Manchester United ===
Southend beat Leeds United in the third round of the League Cup and the draw for the fourth round set up a home tie against trophy holders and Premier League Champions Manchester United on 7 November 2006. The away side fielded a strong team, which included 10 players capped at international level. Cristiano Ronaldo and Wayne Rooney were amongst the starting line up, along with Gabriel Heinze, Darren Fletcher, Wes Brown and Alan Smith. Southend had injuries to strikers Billy Paynter and Lee Bradbury while Matt Harrold was cup tied so boss Steve Tilson partnered Gary Hooper up front with Freddy Eastwood. After 25 minutes Jamal Campbell-Ryce was fouled by David Jones 30 yards from goal; Kevin Maher, Steven Hammell and Freddy Eastwood stood over the free kick, then Eastwood curled "a wonderful free-kick around the wall and into the top corner past Tomasz Kuszczak" as the BBC reported. Southend held on for one of the most famous victories in the club's history. As this is the only meeting between the two sides to date, Southend are one of four sides with a 100% record against the Red Devils (along with Zenit St Petersburg, Vasco de Gama and Bootle Reserves - who defeated Newton Heath, the original name of Manchester United, in the 1890/91 FA Cup 2nd qualifying round).

=== Relegation to League One ===
Southend started the 2006–07 season reasonably well, beating Stoke City 1–0 on the opening day and a few games later Sunderland 3–1. Southend then did not win a league game for 18 games until 9 December 2006 when they beat Southampton 2–1 and West Bromwich Albion 3–1. On New Year's Day 2007, Southend picked up their first away victory of the season over Cardiff City, followed by a 3–1 victory away to Birmingham City on 31 January 2007 which lifted the Shrimpers from the bottom of the division on goal difference. On 9 February 2007, the Shrimpers defeated Queens Park Rangers 5–0 – a disastrous return for Southend's former goalkeeper Simon Royce. Southend escaped the relegation zone on 13 March 2007 when the Blues gained a 1–0 victory over Burnley. But after a 3–0 home defeat to rivals Colchester and only 10 league wins in the season, the Shrimpers were relegated back to League One.

On their return to League One Southend had bolstered their squad, adding Striker Charlie MacDonald, Winger Tommy Black and centre midfielder Nicky Bailey to their ranks. Despite the sale of Freddy Eastwood, Southend finished sixth in League One at the end of 2007–08 much to the thanks Lee Barnard, a January signing from Tottenham Hotspur, scoring 9 goals in 13 games, thus qualifying for a play-off place against Doncaster Rovers. Southend drew the home leg 0–0, but lost the second leg 5–1.

Following the play off defeat to Doncaster Rovers manager Steve Tilson began a mass summer clear out when Goalkeeper Steve Collis, Defender Lewis Hunt, Winger Tommy Black and club captain and loyal servant for over 10 years Kevin Maher were all released. Forwards Matt Harrold, Charlie MacDonald, Gary Hooper and Richie Foran were transfer listed. Darryl Flahavan and Mark Gower both turned down new contracts to sign for Championship sides Crystal Palace and Swansea City respectively. Simon Francis, Peter Clarke and Nicky Bailey were also later placed on the transfer list after failing to agree new contracts at the club. Francis later agreed and signed a new two-year deal. Bailey was being chased by Championship side Charlton Athletic, Bailey put in a man of the match display on Southend's opening game of the season against Peterborough United which was being watched by the London club, the game proved to be Bailey's last for Southend and he signed for Charlton three days later for £500,000 which could rise to £750,000. Peter Clarke remained on the transfer list for the entire season stating that he "never wanted to leave and never asked to be transfer listed" but wanted to concentrate on his football and discuss his future at the end of the season.

Southend pulled off the shock of the summer transfer market with the deadline day signing of Crystal Palace legend Dougie Freedman, the Scotsman signed a two-year contract at Roots Hall just minutes before the window shut. Manager Steve Tilson was delighted to bring Freedman to Roots Hall adding some much needed experience to Southend's forward line, something The Blues had been without since the retirement of Shaun Goater. Tilson also signed goalkeeper Steve Mildenhall from Yeovil Town as his new number one following the departure of Darryl Flahavan and the shot stopper became a firm favourite with the Southend fans. With Kevin Maher's departure Adam Barrett was officially named new club captain. Southend ended the season well with a run of just one defeat in nine games in February and March, that form was much down to two loan signings: Theo Robinson, a striker who signed until the end of the season from Championship side Watford, and France U21 centre back Dorian Dervite signed from Tottenham Hotspur also until the end of the season. Both were influential in Southend's late surge up the League One table. Despite this good form, Southend missed out on a play-off place with an eighth-place finish. Peter Clarke, who had remained on the transfer list for the entire season won the club's player of the season award before leaving the club and signed a three-year deal with League One rivals Huddersfield Town. Clarke admitted that he was leaving with a heavy heart, thanking the fans and management for their support.

The following day former manager David Webb was installed as Steve Tilson's new assistant. Webb stated that his role was only until the end of the 2009/10 season.

=== Relegation to League Two ===
A dismal run of just one win in 2010 left Southend deep in trouble at the wrong end of the table, relegation was confirmed on 24 April 2010 away to Oldham despite twice coming from behind to earn a 2–2 draw. With League Two having a salary cap, high earners at the club left. Player of the season Simon Francis and goalkeeper Steve Mildenhall were placed on the transfer list, Francis was given permission to speak to League One side Brentford but he failed to agree terms. Winger Damian Scannell turned down a new deal to sign a two-year deal with Dagenham & Redbridge. Club captain Adam Barrett and vice captain Alan McCormack both had their contracts terminated by mutual consent. McCormack made a short switch to London signing a two-year contract with Charlton Athletic. Barrett later joined Championship side Crystal Palace where he linked up with former Southend coach Dean Austin and former Southend striker Dougie Freedman, assistant manager at Selhurst Park.

On 4 July 2010 manager Steve Tilson was put on gardening leave, ending his seven-year stint as manager. Chairman Ron Martin stated that he didn't see the fight from the players or the manager.

=== 2009–2010: HMRC and administration fears ===
In October 2009 Southend faced a winding up order from HM Revenue & Customs over an unpaid tax bill of £690,000. The club were also hit with a transfer embargo, this left Steve Tilson with just 12 fit professionals due to injuries and suspensions to his already threadbare squad. George Friend, who was on loan with Southend from Wolves before the embargo was in place, was unable to have his loan extended, despite an agreement between the two clubs for the left back to stay at Roots Hall.

On 27 October 2009, Southend avoided the prospect of a winding up order but the club could still have fallen into administration, acquiring an automatic 10 point deduction so every point on the field was vital. Southend beat Gillingham 1–0 on 30 October with Lee Barnard scoring the winning goal in the 3rd minute of injury time. Southend avoided going into administration on 9 November having paid the outstanding tax bill of £2.135 million on 6 November. The Guardian reported "A previous high court hearing was told that HMRC originally presented a winding-up petition for a tax bill of £690,000, but applied to have the club put into administration when the debt became larger." On 12 December 2009 the transfer embargo was lifted.

On 10 February 2010, Southend were back in court for another unpaid tax bill, this time £205,000. Southend chairman Ron Martin claimed that he was refusing to pay because the initial tax bill of £2.1 million was overpaid, the winding up petition was adjourned for 28 days. On 9 March 2010, Southend confirmed that the players had not yet been paid for and February and the PFA had to pay the players for January, the club were placed under another transfer embargo until they paid the money back. On 10 March 2010 Southend were given a 35-day extension to pay the unpaid bill or face administration.

On 14 April 2010, Southend were granted a final seven days to pay the outstanding bill. On 20 April 2010 the fee of £378,500 was paid.

On 2 August 2010, all cases against Southend United were dropped and an agreement was reached with HMRC. Southend's transfer embargo was lifted later that week.

== 2010–2019 ==
On 5 July 2010 former Sheffield Wednesday and Plymouth Argyle manager, Paul Sturrock was announced as the new manager with Tommy Widdrington as his assistant. Sturrock's first signings for Southend were former Northampton Town left back Peter Gilbert and striker Barry Corr who was released by Exeter City. Both players had played under Sturrock previously. Southend being under a transfer embargo both players could only sign pre contract agreements.

A squad of 17 players were only registered in time to play on the eve of the new season as the club's transfer embargo was lifted. Sturrock led Southend to a respectable 13th-placed finish in his first season. The club mounted a more serious challenge the following season, spending 11 weeks at the top of League 2, owing to the goals and form of Ryan Hall, Kane Ferdinand and Liam Dickinson. A subsequent decline in form meant the team had to enter the play-offs after finishing the season in 4th place with 83 points, a total that in any other year in League 2, would have won the league. Southend lost the play off semi-final against Crewe Alexandra 3–2 on aggregate.

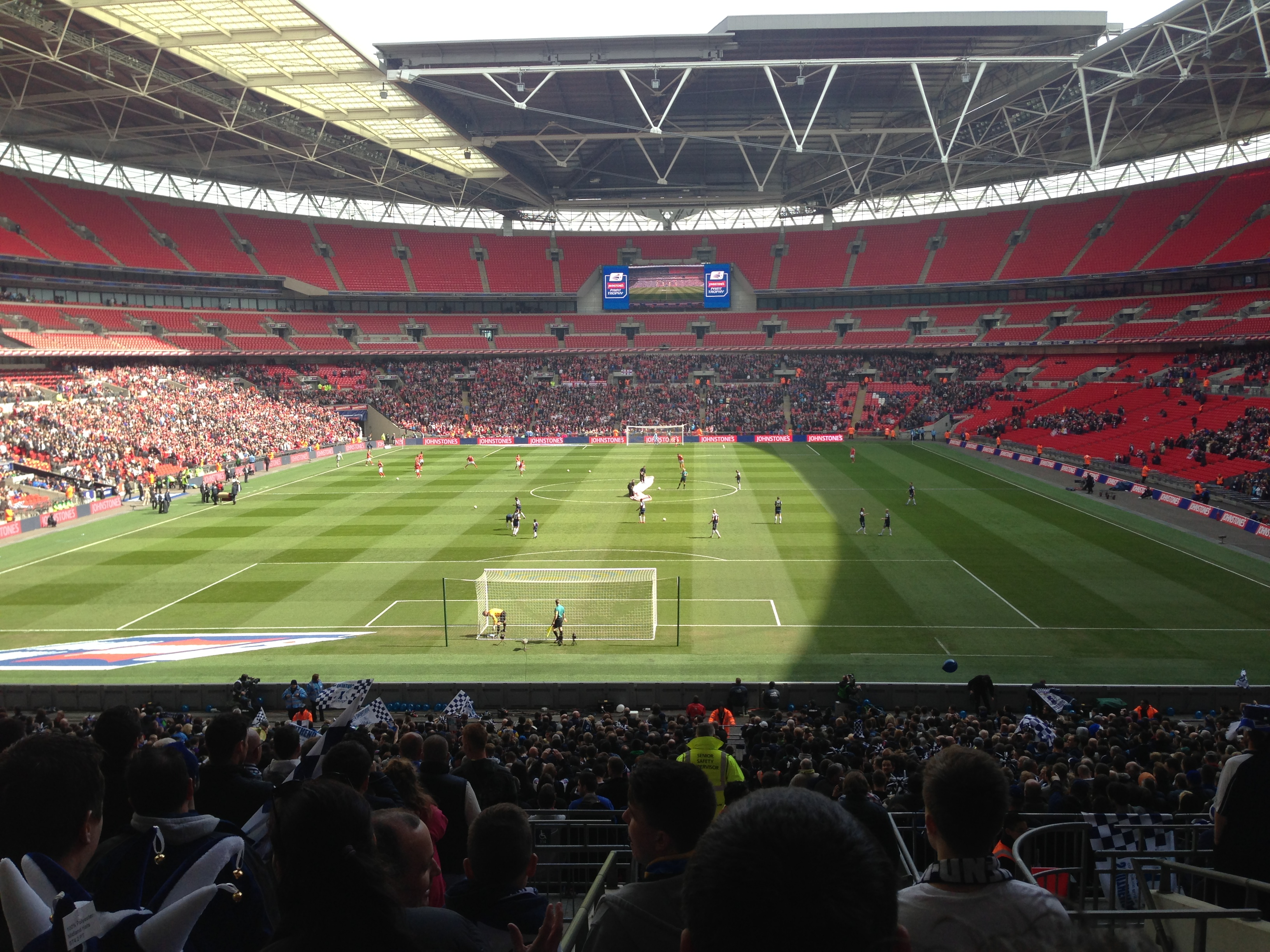
Southend United at Wembley

A transfer embargo at the start of the 2012–13 season meant that the club started its campaign with a depleted squad. The loan signing of Britt Assombalonga from Watford proved a success as the youngster scored 12 goals in 18 appearances. Blues went on a run of 14 games unbeaten which saw them reach 4th in the table. At the turn of the year Southend's form dramatically dropped, although the club reached its first ever Wembley cup final in the Football League Trophy. Paul Sturrock was sacked 2 weeks before the cup final but was controversially asked to manage the team for the final. Sturrock refused and watched the game from the stand. The Blues took a record 33,000 fans to the match, but lost 2–0 to Crewe Alexandra.

Phil Brown was brought in as Sturrock's successor but picked up just one win in his eight games in charge as Southend finished the season in 11th position, with only six league wins at Roots Hall all season, a worse home record than Barnet and Aldershot who were relegated.

Brown brought in former Darlington Manager Dave Penney as his assistant, whilst retaining Graham Coughlan as first team coach. Bob Shaw was also brought in as Head of Scouting and Recruitment. Brown's first summer signing was full back John White who had been released from neighbours Colchester United. He also signed former Hull City winger Will Atkinson who had left Bradford City. In 2015 Phil Brown led the team, after a thrilling play-off final against Wycombe Wanderers (7–6 on penalties), into League One. At the end of the 2016/2017 season the club missed the play-offs for the Championship by only one point.

On 22 October 2019, Sol Campbell was appointed manager of Southend. Campbell took charge for his first game — a 3–1 home defeat to Ipswich Town — on 25 October.

== 2020–2024: financial difficulties ==
Financial difficulties resulted in non-payment of Southend players' and other employees' wages several times during the 2019–20 season. A HMRC winding-up petition was adjourned four times during 2020. In April 2020, during the COVID-19 pandemic, Southend put "several staff and some players" on furlough under the UK Government's emergency job retention scheme - a move criticised by the PFA who said the club had "consistently" let players down over wages. On 9 June, EFL League One and Two clubs agreed to end the 2019–20 season; Southend were relegated to League Two. On 30 June 2020, manager Campbell left the club, to be later succeeded by Mark Molesley and then Phil Brown, but Southend suffered a second successive relegation, dropping out of the Football League after 101 years.

In October 2020, after the club settled tax debts of £493,931 with HMRC, a winding-up petition was dismissed by the High Court. In August 2021, Southend revealed their overall debt in July 2019 was £17.4M. On 5 and 9 October 2021, Southend fans staged protests demanding Martin's departure. Brown was sacked in October, and was replaced by Kevin Maher. Southend finished their first National League season in 13th position.

In September 2022, the club was placed under a transfer embargo after a missed HMRC payment, and in October 2022, HMRC issued a winding-up petition. Wages in late 2022 and early 2023 were paid late. The January 2023 HMRC winding-up hearing was adjourned again, to 1 March 2023. Less than 24 hours before the winding-up hearing, the club said it had paid the £1.4M tax bill, and the winding-up petition was dismissed, but a transfer embargo remained in place. The club finished their second National League season in 8th position; non-playing staff at the club had not been paid for the past two months.

On 17 March 2023, the club was put up for sale as its financial difficulties continued, and on 4 May 2023 the club was served another HMRC winding-up petition—their 18th. The hearing was adjourned twice to give Martin more time to sell the club. In July 2023, after repeated late payment of club staff wages, players refused to resume pre-season training until they were paid. While players were eventually paid, manager Maher and other backroom staff remained unpaid three days before the winding-up hearing, while club sale discussions were reportedly being held up by the stadium side of the transaction; Martin said he would sell his stake in the club for £1, but wanted £4.5M for Roots Hall. The club also needed £1M "in the short term" to settle its latest HMRC winding-up petition and lift a transfer embargo. Football debts were settled in July 2023, allowing the club to remain in the National League. However the HMRC debt was not paid in full leading to a 10 point deduction by the league.

On 23 August 2023, the winding-up hearing was adjourned for a third and final time, to 4 October. In September 2023, the Justin Rees consortium said that two bids to Ron Martin had been rejected, and fans staged further anti-Martin protests. In October 2023, the sale of the club to the Justin Rees consortium was agreed, but formal completion was repeatedly delayed. The deal was announced the day before the High Court hearing of HMRC's winding-up petition, the HMRC debt was paid, and the winding-up petition was duly dismissed. In December 2023, Martin and the Rees consortium exchanged contracts for the sale of the club, and, after 15 months, Southend's transfer embargo was lifted. Southend finished the 2023–24 National League season in 9th place.

Another winding-up petition hearing was held on 15 May, when the consortium and Martin sought a six-week adjournment. The club was given six weeks to settle with creditors or face liquidation.

As a consequence of the unresolved winding-up order, Southend were placed under a fresh transfer embargo. Settlements were agreed with creditors, the winding-up petition was dismissed in the High Court, and on 19 July 2024, the COSU consortium headed by Justin Rees completed its takeover of Southend United.

== 2025–present ==
Southend finished the 2024–25 National League season in the play-off places, eventually meeting Oldham Athletic in the final at Wembley Stadium but lost 3–2 after extra time. The following season, 2025–26, Southend reached the FA Trophy final and again finished in the National League play-off places, but lost their qualifying match against Scunthorpe United. On 17 May 2026, Southend returned to Wembley and beat Wealdstone in a penalty shootout to win the FA Trophy. Two days later, head coach Kevin Maher plus coaching staff Darren Currie and Mark Bentley were sacked following a review of the 2025–26 season.
