= 2008–09 Notts County F.C. season =

Notts County
2008–09 season
- Manager: Ian McParland
- Football League Two: 19th
- FA Cup: 2nd Round
- League Cup: 2nd Round
- Football League Trophy: 1st Round
- Top goalscorer: League: Delroy Facey (9); All: Richard Butcher (10)
- Highest home attendance: 6,033 vs Aldershot Town, 27 September 2008
- Lowest home attendance: 2,886 vs Luton Town, 10 March 2009
- Average home league attendance: 3,928

Notts County are the oldest club in the Football League. The 2008–09 season was its 12th year in The Football League.

== Season review ==
=== League Two ===
Pos	Team	Pld	W	D	L	GF	GA	GD	Pts
17	Barnet	46	11	15	20	56	74	−18	48
18	Port Vale	46	13	9	24	44	66	−22	48
19	Notts County	46	11	14	21	49	69	−20	47
20	Macclesfield Town	46	13	8	25	45	77	−32	47
21	Bournemouth	46	17	12	17	59	51	+8	46 (Note: Bournemouth deducted 17 points for leaving administration without a Company Voluntary Agreement.)

Source: The Football League
Rules for classification: 1) points; 2) goal difference; 3) number of goals scored.

==== Results summary ====
Overall								Home						Away					
Pld	W	D	L	GF	GA	GD	Pts	W	D	L	GF	GA	GD	W	D	L	GF	GA	GD
46	11	14	21	49	69	−20	47	6	6	11	22	31	−9	5	8	10	27	38	−11

Last updated: 2 May 2009.

=== Cups ===
==== FA Cup ====
Notts County took on non-League side Sutton Town where they won. After that they took on another non-league side, Kettering Town where they drew resulting in a replay where they lost 2–1.

==== League Cup ====
Notts County started their League Cup campaign against newly promoted Championship side, Doncaster Rovers. Myles Weston scored the only goal to put them through to the second round, where they took on Premier League side Wigan Athletic. There they lost 4–0.

==== Football League Trophy ====
Notts County's Football League Trophy campaign only lasted one match. League One outfit Scunthorpe United beat the County 2–1 at Glanford Park.

== Squad ==
Note: Flags indicate national team as defined under FIFA eligibility rules; some limited exceptions apply. Players may hold more than one non-FIFA nationality.

No.	Pos.	Nation	Player
1	GK	ENG	Russell Hoult
2	DF	ENG	Phil Picken
4	DF	ENG	Mike Edwards
5	DF	ENG	Adam Tann
6	DF	JAM	Michael Johnson
7	MF	ENG	Matthew Hamshaw
9	FW	ENG	Jamie Forrester
11	MF	ENG	Myles Weston
12	GK	ENG	Kevin Pilkington
14	FW	ENG	Sean Canham

No.	Pos.	Nation	Player
15	MF	SCO	Gavin Strachan
16	FW	ENG	Ben Fairclough
17	DF	ENG	Jamie Clapham
18	DF	ENG	Stephen Hunt
20	DF	IRL	John Thompson (captain)
22	FW	GRN	Delroy Facey
23	MF	ENG	Richard Butcher
24		ENG	Matt Richards
25	MF	ENG	Adam Nowland

=== Statistics ===
As of end of season

No.	Pos	Nat	Player	Total		League Two		FA Cup		League Cup		Football League Trophy	
No.	Pos	Nat	Player	Apps	Goals	Apps	Goals	Apps	Goals	Apps	Goals	Apps	Goals
1	GK	(England) ENG	Russell Hoult	21	0	16	0	3	0	1	0	1	0
2	DF	(England) ENG	Jason Beardsley*	14	0	11	0	0	0	2	0	1	0
2	DF	(England) ENG	Phil Picken	22	0	22	0	0	0	0	0	0	0
3	DF	(England) ENG	Paul Mayo*	16	2	10+2	2	1	0	2	0	1	0
4	DF	(England) ENG	Mike Edwards	49	2	42+1	2	3	0	2	0	1	0
5	DF	(England) ENG	Adam Tann	17	0	9+5	0	0	0	2	0	1	0
6	DF	(Jamaica) JAM	Michael Johnson	30	2	29	2	0	0	0	0	1	0
7	MF	(England) ENG	Matthew Hamshaw	46	3	39+2	3	2	0	2	0	1	0
8	MF	(England) ENG	Neil MacKenzie*	4	0	0+1	0	0	0	2	0	1	0
9	FW	(England) ENG	Jamie Forrester	32	8	27+3	8	2	0	0	0	0	0
10	FW	(England) ENG	Jay Smith*	18	1	6+7	0	2	1	2	0	1	0
11	MF	(England) ENG	Myles Weston	50	4	44	3	3	0	2	1	1	0
12	GK	(England) ENG	Kevin Pilkington	26	0	25	0	0	0	1	0	0	0
14	FW	(England) ENG	Sean Canham	29	4	7+16	3	3	1	2	0	1	0
15	MF	(Scotland) SCO	Gavin Strachan	19	1	13+5	1	1	0	0	0	0	0
16	FW	(England) ENG	Ben Fairclough	11	0	2+6	0	0	0	2	0	1	0
17	DF	(England) ENG	Jamie Clapham	43	2	40	2	3	0	0	0	0	0
18	DF	(England) ENG	Stephen Hunt	13	0	8+3	0	2	0	0	0	0	0
19	MF	(England) ENG	Nathaniel Wedderburn*	11	0	3+6	0	2	0	0	0	0	0
20	DF	(Republic of Ireland) IRL	John Thompson	38	2	35	2	3	0	0	0	0	0
21	FW	(England) ENG	Spencer Weir-Daley*	14	0	0+10	0	2	0	2	0	0	0
22	FW	(Grenada) GRN	Delroy Facey	51	9	44+1	9	3	0	2	0	1	0
23	MF	(England) ENG	Richard Butcher	39	10	29+5	8	2	1	2	0	1	1
24	DF	(England) ENG	Mitchell Hanson*	5	0	5	0	0	0	0	0	0	0
24		(England) ENG	Matt Richards	1	0	0+1	0	0	0	0	0	0	0
25	MF	(England) ENG	Adam Nowland	21	0	16+4	0	1	0	0	0	0	0
26	MF	(England) ENG	Lewis Neal*	6	0	4	0	2	0	0	0	0	0
26	GK	(England) ENG	Josh Lillis*	5	0	5	0	0	0	0	0	0	0
27	FW	(England) ENG	Jonathan Forte*	18	8	15+3	8	0	0	0	0	0	0

- *Indicates player left during the season

==== Disciplinary record ====
Number	Pos	Player	Booked	Sent off (straight red)
20	DF	John Thompson	11	0
06	DF	Michael Johnson	9	0
09	FW	Jamie Forrester	0	1
07	MF	Matthew Hamshaw	4	0
10	FW	Jay Smith	4	0
02	DF	Phil Picken	4	0
04	DF	Mike Edwards	3	0
11	MF	Myles Weston	3	0
14	FW	Sean Canham	2	0
17	DF	Jamie Clapham	2	0
24	DF	Mitchell Hanson	2	0
03	DF	Paul Mayo	2	0
25	MF	Adam Nowland	2	0
02	DF	Jason Beardsley	1	0
23	MF	Richard Butcher	1	0
22	FW	Delroy Facey	1	0
10	FW	Jonathan Forte	1	0
18	DF	Stephen Hunt	1	0
26	MF	Lewis Neal	1	0
12	GK	Kevin Pilkington	1	0
05	DF	Adam Tann	1	0
19	MF	Nathaniel Wedderburn	1	0

== Transfers ==
=== Summer transfers in ===
Player	Club	Fee
Sean Canham	Team Bath	Undisclosed
Delroy Facey	Gillingham	Free
Jamie Forrester	Lincoln City	Free
Matt Hamshaw	Unattached	Free
Michael Johnson	Derby County	Free

=== Loans in ===
Player	Club	Arrival Date	Date Return
Jason Beardsley	Derby County	5 June 2008	31 December 2008
Jonathan Forte	Scunthorpe United	13 November 2008	13 December 2008
Jonathan Forte	Scunthorpe United	February 2009	18 April 2009
Phil Picken	Chesterfield		End of Season

=== January transfers out ===
Player	Club	Fee
Paul Mayo	Released	–
Jay Smith	Released	–

== Fixtures and results ==
=== League ===
Date	Opponent	Venue	Result	Attendance	Scorers
9 August 2008	Bradford City	A	1–2	14,038	Butcher
16 August 2008	Darlington	H	0–0	4,352	
23 August 2008	Luton Town	A	1–1	6,058	Forrester
30 August 2008	Shrewsbury Town	H	2–2	4,697	Edwards, Butcher
6 September 2008	A.F.C. Bournemouth	H	1–1	4,362	Forrester
13 September 2008	Accrington Stanley	A	1–1	1,404	Canham
20 September 2008	Exeter City	A	2–2	4,341	Johnson, Canham
27 September 2008	Aldershot Town	H	2–1	6,033	Johnson, Butcher
4 October 2008	Port Vale	A	2–1	6,247	Forrester, Weston
13 October 2008	Brentford	H	1–1	6,012	Forrester
18 October 2008	Macclesfield Town	H	1–1	4,600	Facey
21 October 2008	Gillingham	A	2–2	4,396	Butcher, Facey
25 October 2008	Chesterfield	A	1–3	4,134	Facey
28 October 2008	Rochdale	H	1–2	3,610	Forrester
1 November 2008	Bury	H	0–1	4,391	
15 November 2008	Barnet	A	4–0	1,934	Butcher, Forte (3)
22 November 2008	Dagenham & Redbridge	A	1–6	1,743	Forte
25 November 2008	Wycombe Wanderers	H	0–2	2,964	
6 December 2008	Morecambe	H	1–0	3,671	Canham
13 December 2008	Chester City	A	0–2	1,767	
20 December 2008	Lincoln City	H	0–1	4,568	
26 December 2008	Grimsby Town	A	1–0	5,432	Facey
28 December 2008	Rotherham United	H	0–3	6,686	
10 January 2009	Exeter City	H	2–1	3,832	Facey, Strachan
17 January 2009	Brentford	A	1–1	5,465	Facey
20 January 2009	Aldershot Town	A	2–2	2,491	Clapham, Hamshaw
24 January 2009	Port Vale	H	4–2	4,447	Weston, Forrester (3)
27 January 2009	Rochdale	A	0–3	2,289	
31 January 2009	Chesterfield	H	0–1	4,953	
14 February 2009	Barnet	H	2–0	3,830	Hamshaw, Clapham
17 February 2009	Macclesfield Town	A	1–1	1,370	Hamshaw
21 February 2009	Bury	A	0–2	2,810	
28 February 2009	Bradford City	H	3–1	5,138	Forte (2), Facey
3 March 2009	Darlington	A	0–1	2,450	
7 March 2009	Shrewsbury Town	A	2–3	5,192	Butcher, Forte
10 March 2009	Luton Town	H	0–2	2,886	
14 March 2009	Accrington Stanley	H	1–1	3,701	Facey
17 March 2009	Gillingham	H	0–1	3,189	
21 March 2009	A.F.C. Bournemouth	A	1–0	5,510	Weston
28 March 2009	Lincoln City	A	1–1	4,027	Facey
4 April 2009	Chester City	H	1–2	4,025	Edwards
11 April 2009	Rotherham United	A	1–2	2,945	Forte
13 April 2009	Grimsby Town	H	0–2	5,890	
18 April 2009	Morecambe	A	0–1	2,161	
25 April 2009	Dagenham & Redbridge	H	0–3	4,419	
2 May 2009	Wycombe Wanderers	A	2–1	9,625	Thompson

=== FA Cup ===
Date	Round	Opponent	Venue	Result	Attendance	Scorers
6 November 2008	One	Sutton United	A	1–0	4,391	Butcher
30 November 2008	Two	Kettering Town	H	1–1	4,451	Canham
10 December 2008	Two (replay)	Kettering Town	A	1–2	3,019	Smith

=== League Cup ===
Date	Round	Opponent	Venue	Result	Attendance	Scorers
12 August 2008	One	Doncaster Rovers	H	1–0	3,272	Weston
26 August 2008	Two	Wigan Athletic	A	0–4	4,100	

=== Football League Trophy ===
Date	Round	Opponent	Venue	Result	Attendance	Scorers
2 September 2008	One	Scunthorpe United	A	1–2	1,755	Butcher

== Backroom staff ==
Position	Name
First-Team Manager	Ian McParland
Assistant Manager	Dave Kevan
Coach	Tommy Johnson
Youth Team Manager	
Goalkeeping Coach	Carl Muggleton
Physio	Paul Godfrey
Fitness Coach	Marcus Svensson
Head of Youth	Mick Leonard

== See also ==
- Notts County F.C. seasons
