= Daniel Greaves =

Daniel Greaves may refer to:

- Daniel Greaves (musician) (born 1970), Canadian rock vocalist and songwriter
- Dan Greaves (discus thrower) (born 1982), British athlete
- Danny Greaves (footballer) (born 1963), English former professional footballer
- Daniel Greaves, Best Animated Short Film winner in 64th Academy Awards
