= Mark Salter (footballer) =

English footballer

Personal information
- Full name: Mark Charles Salter
- Date of birth: 16 March 1980 (age 46)
- Place of birth: Oxford, England
- Position: Forward

Team information
- Current team: Bridport

Senior career*
Years	Team	Apps	(Gls)
1999–2002	Frome Town	139	(86)
2002–2003	Southend United	13	(1)
2003	Bath City	13	(1)
2003–2010	Frome Town	311	(206)
2010–2013	Bitton	124	(91)
2013–????	Street	26	(18)
2015–	Bridport		
- * Club domestic league appearances and goals as of 23:27, 5 June 2011 (UTC)

Mark Salter (born 16 March 1980) is an English footballer, who played as a forward. He played in the Football League for Southend United, when he signed from Frome Town in 2002. He was released by Southend at the end of the 2002–03 season and joined Bath City for the following season. Salter left Bath three-months later when he rejoined former club Frome Town. In October 2007, he became Frome's all-time top goalscorer with 213 goals. He left Frome in July 2010, having scored a total of 292 goals.

== Career ==
Southend United manager Rob Newman signed Salter in October 2002 from Frome Town, having previously trialled at the Essex club during pre-season. He scored 86 goals in 139 appearances, over three seasons whilst playing with Western Football League club, Frome Town.

He made his debut for Southend United in the Football League Trophy, in the 6–1 away defeat against Swindon Town on 22 October 2002, coming on as a substitute in the 55th minute for Barrington Belgrave. He made his Football League debut against Wrexham in the 1–0 away defeat, on 2 November 2002, coming on as a substitute for Neil Jenkins in the 74th minute. Salter was released by Southend at the end of the 2002–03 season.

Salter joined Bath City in July 2003 after his release from Southend, he scored one goal in 13 appearances in the Southern Football League Premier Division. He rejoined former club, Frome Town in October for an undisclosed four-figure fee, which was a club record. He became the club's all-time leading goalscorer on 13 October 2007, when he scored his 213th goal over Street in their 5–0 win in the Western Football League Premier Division.

In July 2010, Salter left Frome Town to join Western Football League Premier Division club Bitton. He left having scored a total of 292 goals in 450 appearances for the club. In his first season for Bitton, Salter scored 32 goals in 25 appearances in all competitions.

In October 2015 he signed for Bridport.
