= List of people with narcolepsy =

This is a list of notable people who have narcolepsy.

== List ==
- Jinkx Monsoon, American drag performer. Known for competing on RuPaul's Drag Race.
- Gabe Barham, drummer for American post-hardcore band Sleeping With Sirens
- Franck Bouyer, French road racing cyclist
- Lenny Bruce, American stand-up comedian, social critic, and satirist
- Molly Burhans, Environmentalist and cartographer
- Kevin Cadogan, musician (Third Eye Blind)
- George M. Church, molecular geneticist
- Sir Winston Churchill, British statesman, army officer, writer and Prime Minister of United Kingdom(speculated)
- Graeme Dott, Scottish snooker player, 2006 World Champion
- Aaron Flahavan, Portsmouth F.C Goalkeeper who died in 2001
- G.O, K-pop idol (member of K-pop boygroup MBLAQ)
- Paul Gonsalves, jazz musician
- Teresa Nielsen Hayden, science fiction editor and essayist
- Harold M. Ickes, deputy White House chief of staff to Bill Clinton
- Jimmy Kimmel, late night talk show host
- Nastassja Kinski, actress
- Arthur Lowe, actor
- Harriet Tubman, American abolitionist and political activist (speculated)
- Kang Daniel, K-pop idol (member of K-pop boygroup Wanna One)
- Dawn (rapper), South-Korean rapper and former K-pop idol
- Demi Adejuyigbe, British and American writer and comedian
