= Myles Weston =

Antigua and Barbuda footballer (born 1988)

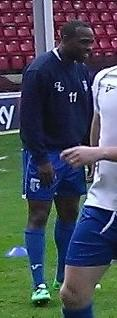
- Weston with Gillingham in 2014

Personal information
- Full name: Myles Arthur Eugene Wesley Weston
- Date of birth: 12 March 1988 (age 38)
- Place of birth: Lewisham, England
- Height: 1.80 m (5 ft 11 in)
- Positions: Winger; striker

Team information
- Current team: Hornchurch
- Number: 18

Youth career
- 1999–2000: Arsenal
- 2000–2006: Charlton Athletic

Senior career*
Years	Team	Apps	(Gls)
2006–2007	Charlton Athletic	0	(0)
2007	→ Notts County (loan)	4	(0)
2007–2009	Notts County	69	(3)
2009–2012	Brentford	108	(12)
2012–2014	Gillingham	76	(10)
2014–2016	Southend United	51	(2)
2016–2017	Wycombe Wanderers	19	(3)
2017–2020	Ebbsfleet United	107	(11)
2020–2023	Dagenham & Redbridge	127	(7)
2023–2025	Bromley	10	(0)
2024–2025	→ Hornchurch (loan)	16	(0)
2025–	Hornchurch	69	(1)

International career^{‡}
2003–2004	England U16	10	(4)
2003–2005	England U17	16	(4)
2005–2006	England U18	2	(0)
2005	England U19	3	(0)
2014–	Antigua and Barbuda	16	(9)
- * Club domestic league appearances and goals as of 21:24, 8 November 2026 (UTC) ‡ National team caps and goals as of 17:10, 19 May 2025 (UTC)

Myles Arthur Eugene Wesley Weston (born 12 March 1988) is a professional footballer who plays as a left winger for National League club Hornchurch. Born in England, he represents Antigua and Barbuda at international level.

== Club career ==
=== Charlton Athletic ===
Weston was born in Lewisham, London. He joined the academy at Premier League side Arsenal at age 11, before moving to the academy at fellow Premier League side Charlton Athletic at age 12. Weston signed his first professional contract in the summer of 2006.

With his first team opportunities limited at Charlton Athletic, Weston was loaned out to Notts County on a one–initial month loan in March 2007. After appearing twice as an unused substitute, Weston made his Notts County debut on 7 April 2007, in a 2–0 win over Boston United. Following this, Weston had his loan spell at Notts County extended until 5 May 2007.

After playing four games on loan for in April 2007, he was released by Charlton Athletic at the end of the 2006–07 season without ever playing for the Addicks' senior team.

=== Notts County ===
Following his release from Charlton Athletic, Weston re–joined Notts County on 4 July 2007 on a two-year contract. He was a prominent member of the Notts County team that season, with his electric pace and skill winning over the fans.

After missing out one match in the opening game of the season, Weston made his Notts County, where he came on as a second-half substitute, in a 1–1 draw against Brentford. But the match against Brentford resulted him injuring his hamstring and sidelined for four weeks. It was not until 13 October 2007 when he made his first team return, coming on as a second-half substitute, in a 3–1 win over Bury. After being sidelined later in the season on three occasions, including a groin injury, he made his return from injury later on and soon set up one of the two goals despite losing 4–2 against Rochdale on 8 April 2008. In his first season at Notts County, he was able to make twenty–six appearances in all competitions.

The 2008–09 season proved to be an improvement season for Weston, as his first team opportunities began to increase and became a first team regular. Weston scored his first goal for Notts County in a League Cup match against Doncaster Rovers. After the match, his performance was praised by Manager Ian McParland, as well as, his work rate. Weston then scored his first league goal for the club on 4 October 2008, in a 2–1 win over Port Vale. Although sidelined in November, Weston continued to regain his first team place for the rest of the season. He went on two more goals later in the 2008–09 season against Port Vale and Bournemouth. He also known for setting up goals, including setting up a brace, in a 3–1 win over Bradford City on 28 February 2009. At the end of the 2008–09 season, having made forty–eight appearances and scoring four times in all competitions, Weston was awarded Player of the Year at the club's award ceremony.

After an impressive 2008–09 season, the club were keen on keeping Weston over a new contract and was offered a new contract as a result. As of January 2009, Weston had not signed a new contract with Notts County, leading to concerns over his departure in January, but it did not happen. But, in March 2009, it was revealed that he had not signed a contract and Weston, himself, said he would wait over a new contract until the end of the season. Despite claims regarding to a new contract, Manager McParland, however, stated Weston had yet to sign a new contract by May.

=== Brentford ===
Brentford then signed Weston after he turned down a new three-year deal at Notts County. "I think he's a foolish boy. That's his choice, but he's made a mistake," Magpies chairman John Armstrong-Holmes told BBC Radio Nottingham. The transfer was completed on 2 July 2009. The tribunal resulted in favour of Notts County, who was awarded £25,000 and increase further every appearance. Weston later reflected on his departure from Notts County to Brentford, quoting: "I don't think they liked it when I left but the main reason was because Brentford were in League 1 and I felt like I wanted to step up to the challenge of playing there. It wasn't about the money or even that it was in London. The reason was because Brentford were in League 1 and Notts County were in League 2."

Weston scored two goals on his Brentford debut against Carlisle United in the opening game of the season, which saw Brentford win 3–1. Since then, Weston established himself in the first team at Brentford and even put as a forward position around October. It was not until 24 October 2009 when he scored again, in a 2–0 win over Stockport County and scored a brace in a FA Cup replay against Gateshead on 17 November 2009 with a 5–2 win. But during a 1–1 draw against Walsall on 21 November 2009, he suffered a hamstring injury, resulted him substituted and sidelined for weeks. After returning to the first team from injury in mid–December, Weston scored two more braces, which were against Carlisle United and Gillingham. He scored the follow-up, in a 1–1 draw against Wycombe Wanderers on 13 February 2010. His performance resulted him in signing a contract extension, keeping him until 2012 and finishing his first season, scoring ten goals in forty–four appearances in all competitions.

However, at the start of the 2010–11 season, Weston suffered a groin injury in 2–0 loss against Carlisle United in the opening game of the season despite playing 90 minutes. After missing out one game, he returned to the first team on 14 August 2010, in a 2–1 loss against Walsall. Following this, Weston became a first team regular for the side and played in the left–wing position for most of the season. Weston scored his first goal of the season on 9 October 2010, in a 3–1 loss against Oldham Athletic. However, in a 4–2 win over Exeter City on 30 October 2010, Weston was in a row with Robbie Simpson over a penalty kick and took a penalty spot, which resulted he missed the spot kick. This caused Manager Andy Scott to inform that Weston should not take penalties again. He then signed a contract extension on 26 November 2010, keeping him until 2013. Although he was absent from the first team on two occasions by the end of 2011, Weston continued to regain his first team for the rest of the season despite being a move away from the club in January. It was not until 5 February 2011 when Weston later scored a brace, in a 2–0 win over Plymouth Argyle. Weston finished the 2010–11 season, making fifty–one appearances and scoring three times in all competitions.

In the 2011–12 season, Weston continued to be in the first team regular at Brentford from the start of the season, started out on the substitute bench. Despite this, he went on to assists three times in four league matches against Walsall, Colchester United and Preston North End. He scored his first goal of the season on 24 September 2011, in a 2–0 win over Oldham Athletic. However, his 2011–12 season was plagued by injuries and only made thirty–one appearances and scored once in all competitions.

Ahead of the 2012–13 season, Weston expected to remain in the first team despite facing competitions from new signings. He made one appearance for the side in the 2012–13 season, which came against Walsall in the first round of League Cup. He later reflected on his departure from Brentford, stating that he would less likely to get first team football should he stayed.

=== Gillingham ===
On 17 August 2012 Weston signed for Gillingham on a two-year contract.

Weston scored on his debut two days later against Bradford City. After the match, Weston said there's more to come of scoring goals later in the season. He scored again a week after scoring on his debut, in a 1–1 draw against Dagenham & Redbridge. For his performance, Weston was nominated for the npower Player of the Month Awards for August, but lost out to Jake Wright. Since making his debut, Weston quickly established himself in the first team in the attacking position until he suffered a back injury that kept him out for two matches. After returning to the first team, he then scored two goals in two matches between 13 October 2012 and 20 October 2012 against Aldershot Town and Burton Albion. He also scored two more goals by the end of 2012 against Accrington Staney and Fleetwood Town. Despite being sidelined once more, due to injury, later in the season, Weston went on to two more goals later in the season against Northampton Town and Burton Albion. In his first season at Gillingham, Weston helped the club gain promotion to League One and went on to score eight times in forty appearances in all competitions.

In the 2013–14 season, Weston missed out the start of the season, due to suffering an injury in the club's pre–season tour. But he managed to recover from the injury and made it in time, featuring in the opening game of the season against Colchester United. He continued to be in a first team regular with good form despite struggling score goals since the start of the 2013–14 season. This lasted until he suffered injuries in late December After returning to the first team soon after, Weston scored his first goal for the club on 11 March 2014, in a 4–2 win over Coventry City. He later scored his second goal on 5 April 2014, in a 4–2 loss against Rotherham United. Although he helped the club stay in League One for another season, Weston went on to make forty–three appearances and scoring two times in all competitions.

He was released by the club at the end of the 2013–14 season,

=== Southend United ===
After being released by Gillingham, Weston subsequently joined Southend United, signing a two–year contract on 14 June 2014. Upon joining Southend United, Weston said he could not turn down a move to the club, saying he want to play under Manager Phil Brown. He was given a number eleven shirt ahead of a new season.

After making his debut for Southend United against Accrington Stanley in the opening game of the season, Weston scored his first goal for the club in the followed up, with a 2–0 win over Stevenage. It was not until 20 September 2014 when he scored again, in a 3–2 win over York City. Since making his debut, Weston became a first team regular for Southend United; however, Weston's goal scoring form since September have slumped throughout the season, although he faced no pressure about it. Despite being out of the first team on three occasions, his form continued to suffer for the rest of the season. Nevertheless, Weston helped Southend United gain promotion to League Two after beating Wycombe Wanderers in the penalty–shootout, in which he successfully converted. He went on to make forty appearances and scoring two times in all competitions in his first season at Southend United.

In the 2015–16 season, Weston started off away from the club after being called up by the national team squad in September. After this, it was not until 6 October 2015 when he scored his first goal of the season, in a 3–0 win over Crawley Town in the first round of League Cup. After the match, Manager Brown revealed that he's keen on using him in the first team, having rejected his pleas to be loaned out this season. A week later, on 17 October 2015, he set up two goals, in a 2–1 win over Barnsley. However, Weston suffered a setback when he was injured on two occasions; both with Achilles injury. It was not until March 2016 when he returned to the first team after four months on the sidelines. Although he returned to the first team soon after, his return was short–lived, however, when he suffered a calf problems and never played again after this. Weston went on finish the 2015–16 season, making twenty appearances and scoring once in all competitions.

After two seasons with the Shrimpers, Weston was released following his contract to an end at the end of the 2015–16 season.

=== Wycombe Wanderers ===
After being released by Southend United, Weston signed for Wycombe Wanderers on 30 June 2016, signing a two–year contract. Upon joining the club, he was given a nineteen shirt.

Weston made his Wycombe Wanderers debut, starting the game before being substituted in the 13th minute with an injury, in a 1–0 loss against Crawley Town. As a result, Weston was sidelined for two months. After returning to training, Weston returned to the first team against Barnet on 22 October 2016 but was sent–off for a second bookable offence, in a 2–0 loss. After being absent from a first team for a month, Weston scored his first Wycombe Wanderers goal on 26 December 2016, just coming on as second-half substitute, in a 3–3 draw against Plymouth Argyle. He scored two more goals for the side against Plymouth Argyle and Leyton Orient. Despite being sidelined on three occasions later in the 2016–17 season, Weston finished his first season for Wycombe Wanderers, making twenty–six appearances and scoring three times in all competitions.

=== Ebbsfleet United ===
On 28 June 2017, Weston joined Ebbsfleet United on a free transfer, having expressed a need to be closer to his home and his family.

=== Dagenham & Redbridge ===
On 7 February 2020, he joined fellow National League relegation rivals Dagenham & Redbridge on a deal until June 2021, where he rejoined up with former Ebbsfleet manager Daryl McMahon.

=== Bromley ===
On 14 December 2023, Weston joined National League rivals Bromley. Weston scored two goals in the National League play-off semi-final against Altrincham, securing Bromley's place in the final at Wembley.

=== Hornchurch ===
On 12 November 2024, Weston joined National League South side Hornchurch on loan until January 2024.

On 1 August 2025, Weston returned to Hornchurch on a permanent basis.

== International career ==
Weston is a former England under-16 and under-17 international where he was a teammate of Theo Walcott.

In August 2011, Weston was called up to the Antigua national team for World Cup 2014 qualifiers, but declined the invitation to concentrate on his club (then Brentford) career. Weston was called up a second time in 2012, but again declined due to having just signed for Gillingham.

In November 2014 he was again called up for the team for the 2014 Caribbean Cup. He made his debut on 12 November in the opening group match against Haiti scoring the team's first goal in a 2–2 draw, and provided the assist for the team's equalising goal.

== Career statistics ==
=== Club ===
As of match played 4 March 2025

Appearances and goals by club, season and competition
Club	Season	League			FA Cup		League Cup		Other		Total	
Club	Season	Division	Apps	Goals	Apps	Goals	Apps	Goals	Apps	Goals	Apps	Goals
Charlton Athletic	2006–07	Premier League	0	0	0	0	0	0	—		0	0
Notts County (loan)	2006–07	League Two	4	0	—		—		—		4	0
Notts County	2007–08	League Two	25	0	1	0	1	0	0	0	27	0
Notts County	2008–09	League Two	44	3	3	0	2	1	1 (Note: Appearances in the EFL Trophy)	0	50	4
Notts County	Total		73	3	4	0	3	1	1	0	81	4
Brentford	2009–10	League One	40	8	3	2	1	0	1	0	45	10
Brentford	2010–11	League One	42	3	2	0	3	0	5	0	52	3
Brentford	2011–12	League One	26	1	1	0	1	0	3	0	31	1
Brentford	2012–13	League One	0	0	—		1	0	—		1	0
Brentford	Total		108	12	6	2	6	0	9	0	129	14
Gillingham	2012–13	League Two	37	8	2	0	—		0	0	39	8
Gillingham	2013–14	League One	39	2	2	0	1	0	1	0	43	2
Gillingham	Total		76	10	4	0	1	0	1	0	82	10
Southend United	2014–15	League Two	34	2	1	0	1	0	4 (Note: One appearance in the EFL Trophy, three in League Two play-offs)	0	40	2
Southend United	2015–16	League One	17	0	1	0	1	0	1	1	20	1
Southend United	Total		51	2	2	0	2	0	5	1	60	3
Wycombe Wanderers	2016–17	League Two	19	3	3	0	0	0	4	0	26	3
Ebbsfleet United	2017–18	National League	41	4	3	1	—		5 (Note: Three appearances and one goal in the FA Trophy, two appearances and one goal in National League play-offs)	2	49	7
Ebbsfleet United	2018–19	National League	39	0	2	0	—		0	0	41	0
Ebbsfleet United	2019–20	National League	27	7	3	0	—		0	0	30	7
Ebbsfleet United	Total		107	11	8	1	—		5	2	120	14
Dagenham & Redbridge	2019–20	National League	4	0	—		—		—		4	0
Dagenham & Redbridge	2020–21	National League	27	1	2	0	—		0	0	29	1
Dagenham & Redbridge	2021–22	National League	41	4	2	0	—		3 (Note: Appearances in the FA Trophy)	0	46	4
Dagenham & Redbridge	2022–23	National League	42	2	4	1	—		2	0	48	3
Dagenham & Redbridge	2023–24	National League	13	0	0	0	—		0	0	13	0
Dagenham & Redbridge	Total		127	7	8	1	—		5	0	140	8
Bromley	2023–24	National League	10	0	—		—		3 (Note: One appearance in the FA Trophy, two appearances and two goals in National League play-offs)	2	13	2
Bromley	2024–25	League Two	0	0	0	0	0	0	0	0	0	0
Bromley	Total		10	0	0	0	0	0	3	2	13	2
Hornchurch (loan)	2024–25	National League South	16	0	0	0	—		2 (Note: One appearance in the FA Trophy, one appearance in the Essex Senior Cup)	0	18	0
Career total			587	48	35	4	12	1	35	5	669	58

=== International ===
As of match played 12 September 2023

Appearances and goals by national team and year
National team	Year	Apps	Goals
Antigua and Barbuda	2014	2	1
Antigua and Barbuda	2015	2	1
Antigua and Barbuda	2018	5	5
Antigua and Barbuda	2022	3	1
Antigua and Barbuda	2023	4	1
Total		16	9

==== International goals ====
Scores and results list Antigua and Barbuda's goal tally first.

International goals by date, venue, cap, opponent, score, result and competition
No.	Date	Venue	Cap	Opponent	Score	Result	Competition
1	12 November 2014	Montego Bay Sports Complex, Montego Bay, Jamaica	1	Haiti	1–2	2–2	2014 Caribbean Cup
2	4 September 2015	Sir Vivian Richards Stadium, North Sound, Antigua and Barbuda	3	Guatemala	1–0	1–0	2018 FIFA World Cup qualification
3	21 March 2018	Sir Vivian Richards Stadium, North Sound, Antigua and Barbuda	5	Bermuda	3–1	3–2	Friendly
4	12 October 2018	Thomas Robinson Stadium, Nassau, Bahamas	8	Bahamas	1–0	6–0	2019–20 CONCACAF Nations League qualification
5	12 October 2018	Thomas Robinson Stadium, Nassau, Bahamas	8	Bahamas	4–0	6–0	2019–20 CONCACAF Nations League qualification
6	12 October 2018	Thomas Robinson Stadium, Nassau, Bahamas	8	Bahamas	6–0	6–0	2019–20 CONCACAF Nations League qualification
7	19 November 2018	Stade Pierre-Aliker, Fort-de-France, Martinique	9	Martinique	1–1	4–2	2019–20 CONCACAF Nations League qualification
8	5 June 2022	Warner Park, Basseterre, Antigua and Barbuda	11	Guadeloupe	1–0	1–0	2022–23 CONCACAF Nations League B
9	26 March 2023	Sir Vivian Richards Stadium, North Sound, Antigua and Barbuda	14	Barbados	1–0	1–2	2022–23 CONCACAF Nations League B

== Honours ==
Brentford

- Football League Trophy runner-up: 2010–11

Gillingham

- Football League Two: 2012–13

Southend United

- Football League Two play-offs: 2015

Bromley

- National League play-offs: 2024
