= Matt Richards (footballer, born 1989) =

English footballer

Personal information
- Full name: Matthew Washington Richards
- Date of birth: 1 December 1989 (age 36)
- Place of birth: Derby, England
- Height: 1.76 m (5 ft 9 1/2 in)
- Position: Midfielder

Team information
- Current team: Belper Town

Youth career
- 2007–2008: Derby County

Senior career*
Years	Team	Apps	(Gls)
2008–2009	Wycombe Wanderers	0	(0)
2009	→ Notts County (loan)	1	(0)
2011–2014	Ilkeston	85	(12)
2014	Heanor Town		
2016–	Belper Town		

International career
- England Under 17
- * Club domestic league appearances and goals as of 20:04, 20 August 2017 (UTC)

Matthew Washington Richards (born 1 December 1989) is an English footballer who played as a midfielder in the Football League.

== Career ==
Richards came through the youth team of Derby County but failed to make a first team appearance for the club. He officially signed for Football League Two side Wycombe Wanderers in December 2008 after featuring in reserve games for the club following his release from Derby. on 27 March 2009, he signed for fellow League Two side Notts County on loan until the end of the season. Richards made his professional debut on 2 May 2009, in the Football League Two 2–1 win over his parent club Wycombe Wanderers at Adams Park, coming on as a substitute for Gavin Strachan. He was released from Wycombe in the summer of 2009. He subsequently joined the Glenn Hoddle Academy.

Richards signed for Ilkeston in November 2011 and spent 3 years with them. He briefly joined Heanor Town before taking a year out of the game. Richards returned to action in 2016 when he signed for Belper Town.

== Career statistics ==
Appearances and goals by club, season and competition
Club	Season	League			FA Cup		Other		Total	
Club	Season	Division	Apps	Goals	Apps	Goals	Apps	Goals	Apps	Goals
Wycombe Wanderers	2008–09	League Two	0	0	0	0	0	0	0	0
Notts County (loan)	2008–09	League Two	1	0	0	0	0	0	1	0
Ilkeston	2011–12	Northern Premier League Division One South	25	1	—		5 (Note: Two appearances in FA Trophy; one appearance in Derbyshire Senior Cup; two appearances two goals in Northern Premier League Division One South play-offs)	2	30	3
Ilkeston	2012–13	Northern Premier League Premier Division	31	8	6	2	5 (Note: Two appearances one goal in FA Trophy; three appearances in Derbyshire Senior Cup)	1	42	11
Ilkeston	2013–14	Northern Premier League Premier Division	29	3	1	0	2 (Note: Appearance(s) in Derbyshire Senior Cup)	0	32	3
Ilkeston	Total		85	12	7	2	12	3	104	17
Career total			86	12	7	2	12	3	105	17
