= Dave McSweeney =

English footballer

Personal information
- Full name: David McSweeney
- Date of birth: 28 December 1981 (age 44)
- Place of birth: Basildon, England
- Height: 5 ft 9 in (1.75 m)
- Position: Defender

Youth career
- 199?–2000: Southend United

Senior career*
Years	Team	Apps	(Gls)
2000–2004	Southend United	70	(1)
2004	→ Welling United (loan)	?	(?)
2004–2009	Billericay Town	?	(?)
2009–201?	Billericay Town	?	(?)
201?–201?	AFC Hornchurch	?	(?)
- * Club domestic league appearances and goals as of 19:45, 12 November 2013 (UTC)

David McSweeney (born 28 December 1981) is an English former professional footballer, who played as a defender.

He has also played for Southend United in the Football League from 2000 to 2004. He then dropped into non-League football and had a brief loan spell with Welling United in 2004, before joining Billericay Town on a permanent basis. He is also a builder whilst playing semi-professional football.

== Football career ==
McSweeney joined Southend United as a youth, aged 15. He made his debut in the Second Division for Southend United on 14 October 2000, at home to York City in the 1–0 victory, replacing Garry Cross in the 73rd minute. He went on to make 70 appearances in The Football League for Southend, scoring one goal, which came against Carlisle United on 20 September 2004. He was loaned out to Welling United towards the end of his Southend career.

McSweeney then dropped into non-League football joining Essex outfit Billericay Town in the summer of 2004, after training with Crawley Town and Dagenham & Redbridge. He made over 200 appearances for the club. After five years with Billericay, McSweeney left the club stating he signed for Grays Athletic in the Conference National in June 2009. He rejoined Billericay making his second debut on 26 September in the 4–2 away loss against Chesham United.

== Personal life ==
McSweeney was born in Basildon, Essex. He is also a builder whilst playing as a semi-professional footballer.

== Honours ==
Southend United

- Football League Trophy runner-up: 2003–04
