= Arthur Holden (footballer) =

English footballer

Personal information
- Place of birth: England
- Position: Midfielder

Senior career*
Years	Team	Apps	(Gls)
1903-1906	Portsmouth	17	(2)
1906–1907	Southend United	?	(?)
1907–1909	Plymouth Argyle	83	(10)
1909–1910	Chelsea	20	(1)
1910–1911	Plymouth Argyle	44	(3)
1911–xxxx	Southend United	?	(?)
- * Club domestic league appearances and goals

Arthur Holden was an English footballer who played as a midfielder.

Holden was signed from Portsmouth in August 1906 for Southend United's first season in the Southern League, before joining Plymouth Argyle in 1907. After changing teams, two productive years followed. Holden scored ten goals in 83 Southern League and Western League matches. He joined Chelsea in the summer of 1909, but only stayed there for one season. He scored one goal in 20 league appearances before returning to Plymouth Argyle, who were then managed by Bob Jack. Holden appeared another 44 times in league football for the club and scored four goals before returning to Southend United during the 1911–12 season.
