= Danny Greaves (footballer) =

English footballer and manager

Personal information
- Full name: Daniel Thomas Greaves
- Date of birth: 31 January 1963 (age 63)
- Place of birth: Upminster, England
- Position: Striker

Youth career
- –1981: Tottenham Hotspur

Senior career*
Years	Team	Apps	(Gls)
1981–1984	Southend United	49	(14)
1983–1984	→ Dagenham (loan)		
1984	Cambridge United	4	(1)
1984	Maldon Town		
1984–1985	Chelmsford City	11	(5)
- Witham Town
Total		64+	(20+)

Managerial career
- 2008–2011: Witham Town
- 2011: Great Wakering Rovers
- * Club domestic league appearances and goals

Daniel Thomas Greaves (born 31 January 1963) is an English former professional football player and coach who played as a striker.

== Playing career ==
After graduating from Tottenham Hotspur's youth team, Greaves began his senior career with Southend United, making 49 appearances in the Football League between 1981 and 1984. After playing for Dagenham, he spent a brief period at Cambridge United, making four further appearances in the league, scoring once, before playing non-League football with Maldon Town, and Chelmsford City, where he made 15 appearances, scoring eight goals, in all competitions. Greaves later played for Witham Town in the late 1980s.

== Coaching career ==
After retiring as a player, Greaves became a football manager, and managed Witham Town between 2008 and 2011. During the 2011–12 season, Greaves was manager of Great Wakering Rovers for a six game stint, before resigning.

In 2012, Greaves set up a football academy with Steve Tilson.

In 2015, he became assistant manager to Tilson at C&K Basildon Ladies.

== Personal life ==
His father Jimmy was also a professional footballer. He is of Irish descent through his father.
