= Jay Smith (footballer, born September 1981) =

English footballer (born 1981)

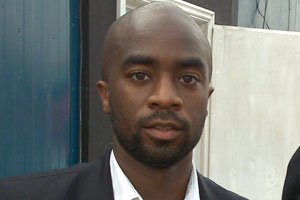

Personal information
- Full name: Jay Alexander Smith
- Date of birth: 24 September 1981 (age 45)
- Place of birth: London, England
- Position: Midfielder

Youth career
- 1998–2003: Aston Villa

Senior career*
Years	Team	Apps	(Gls)
2003–2007	Southend United	62	(7)
2006	→ Oxford United (loan)	6	(0)
2006	→ Notts County (loan)	11	(1)
2007–2009	Notts County	49	(3)
2009–2010	Eastwood Town	4	(0)
2010–2012	Tamworth	62	(2)
2011–2012	→ AFC Telford United (loan)	6	(1)
2012–2013	AFC Telford United	15	(0)
Total		215	(14)
- * Club domestic league appearances and goals

Jay Alexander Smith (born 24 September 1981) is an English former professional footballer who played as a midfielder.

== Playing career ==
Smith started his professional football career with Aston Villa. After a season, he was transferred to Southend United.

Signed in 2002 after a successful loan spell and turning down the advances of Hull City, Smith made his debut in August the same year and quickly became a regular in the Blues side.

A horrendous spell of injuries, including a broken ankle, interrupted his career. Towards the end of the 2005–06 season, Smith was loaned out to Oxford United – and despite impressing manager Jim Smith during the run-in, it was not enough to save Oxford from dropping out of the football league.

Steve Tilson has always maintained that there was a place for a fit Jay Smith in the Southend squad and even after speaking to Oxford about a permanent deal for 2006–07, Smith and Southend committed to each other again and he signed on for another year at Roots Hall.

Smith once again found himself on loan, this time with League Two side Notts County.

On 26 January 2007, Smith was released from Southend and made a permanent switch to Notts County after a successful two-month loan spell.

He was released from his contract in January 2009 five months early along with striker Spencer Weir-Daley.

In December 2009, Smith joined Conference North side Eastwood Town on a one-month deal. The following month the deal was extended for another month, but at the end of January, Smith signed for Conference National side Tamworth. It was announced that Smith would be taking over as club captain for the 2010–11 season from former player Chris Smith. On 18 November 2011, Smith was loaned to AFC Telford United until 5 January 2012. Smith said of the move: "In my eyes I've moved to a bigger club. I'm not going back to Tamworth. My time there has finished now."

In January 2012 his contract was cancelled by Tamworth and he joined Telford on a permanent basis. On 2 May 2013 he was let go by the club.

== Career statistics ==
Appearances and goals by club, season and competition
Club	Season	League			FA Cup		League Cup		Other		Total	
Club	Season	Division	Apps	Goals	Apps	Goals	Apps	Goals	Apps	Goals	Apps	Goals
Southend United	2002–03	Third Division	30	5	4	0	1	0	0	0	35	5
Southend United	2003–04	Third Division	18	1	5	3	0	0	0	0	23	4
Southend United	2004–05	League Two	0	0	0	0	0	0	0	0	0	0
Southend United	2005–06	League One	14	1	1	0	0	0	0	0	15	1
Southend United	Total		62	7	10	3	1	0	0	0	73	10
Oxford United (loan)	2005–06	League Two	6	0	0	0	0	0	0	0	6	0
Notts County (loan)	2006–07	League Two	11	1	0	0	0	0	0	0	11	1
Notts County	2006–07	League Two	14	3	0	0	0	0	0	0	14	3
Notts County	2007–08	League Two	16	0	0	0	1	0	0	0	17	0
Notts County	2008–09	League Two	13	2	1	1	0	0	0	0	14	3
Notts County	Total		43	5	1	1	1	0	0	0	45	6
Eastwood Town	2009–10	Conference North	4	0	0	0	0	0	0	0	4	0
Tamworth	2009–10	Conference National	16	0	0	0	0	0	0	0	16	0
Tamworth	2010–11	Conference National	29	2	3	0	0	0	0	0	32	2
Tamworth	Total		45	2	3	0	0	0	0	0	48	2
AFC Telford (loan)	2011–12	Conference National	6	1	0	0	0	0	0	0	6	1
AFC Telford	2011–12	Conference National	11	0	0	0	0	0	0	0	11	0
AFC Telford	2012–13	Conference National	4	0	0	0	0	0	0	0	4	0
AFC Telford	Total		15	0	0	0	0	0	0	0	15	0
Career total			210	16	14	4	2	0	0	0	228	20

== Honours ==
Southend United

- Football League One: 2005–06
