= Ben Fairclough =

English footballer

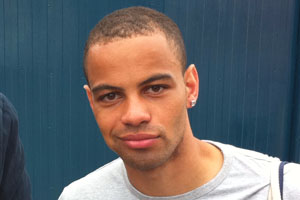

Personal information
- Date of birth: 18 April 1989 (age 37)
- Place of birth: Nottingham, England
- Position: Striker

Youth career
- 2005–2007: Nottingham Forest

Senior career*
Years	Team	Apps	(Gls)
2007–2008	Nottingham Forest	0	(0)
2008–2010	Notts County	8	(0)
2009	→ Ilkeston Town (loan)	4	(0)
2010	Hinckley United	25	(3)
2010–2011	Rocester	74	(8)
2011	Eastwood Town	3	(0)
2011–2014	Boston United	86	(9)
2015	Belper Town		
2015	Lincoln United		
- * Club domestic league appearances and goals as of 06:26, 7 February 2017 (UTC)

Benjamin Michael Stanley Fairclough (born 18 April 1989) is an English footballer, who plays as a striker for Northern Premier League club Lincoln United.

== Playing career ==
=== Notts County ===
Fairclough signed for Notts County after impressing during a pre-season trial, having previously been at local rivals Nottingham Forest. He made his debut for County at home to Doncaster Rovers, in the 1–0 win in the League Cup on 12 August 2008. In 2009, Fairclough went on a short-term loan to Ilkeston Town. On 10 May 2010, he was released by Notts County along with seven other players.

=== Hinckley United ===
He then signed for Hinckley United on 7 August 2010.

=== Rocester ===
On 5 March 2010, he joined Rocester in the Midland Football Alliance on loan from Hinckley United. He became a favourite with the Roman fans playing on the right wing and finished the season of by scoring 7 goals in 17 games.

=== Eastwood Town ===
Ahead of the 2011–12 season, he linked up with Eastwood Town, but he was out of favour and football was hard to come by.

=== Boston United ===
In September 2011 the pacy forward joined Boston United rather than a reported move back to Rocester.

=== Belper Town ===
In August 2015 Fairclough joined Belper Town and he made his debut against Carlton Town on 20 August.

=== Lincoln United ===
During October 2015 Fairclough joined Lincoln United.

== Personal life ==
He is the nephew of former Nottingham Forest and Leeds United defender Chris Fairclough and cousin of former Nottingham Forest youth player Jordan Fairclough.
