= Duncan Jupp =

English footballer (born 1975)

Personal information
- Full name: Duncan Alan Jupp
- Date of birth: 25 January 1975 (age 51)
- Place of birth: Haslemere, England
- Height: 6 ft 0 in (1.83 m)
- Position: Defender

Senior career*
Years	Team	Apps	(Gls)
1993–1996	Fulham	105	(2)
1996–2002	Wimbledon	30	(3)
2002–2003	Notts County	8	(0)
2003	Luton Town	5	(0)
2003–2006	Southend United	100	(1)
2006–2007	Gillingham	29	(0)
2008–2010	Bognor Regis Town	56	(2)
Total		333	(8)

International career
1994–1996	Scotland U21	9	(0)
- * Club domestic league appearances and goals

Duncan Alan Jupp (born 25 January 1975) is a former professional footballer who played as a defender. Born in England, he earned nine caps with the Scotland U21 national team.

== Career ==
Jupp began his career as a trainee with Fulham where he made more than 100 appearances before he moved to Wimbledon for £200,000. He later had spells with Notts County and Luton Town before joining Southend United, where he helped the club to two consecutive promotions - including scoring the decisive goal in the Football League Two Playoff final in 2005 against Lincoln City; his only goal for the club.

He signed for Gillingham on 22 May 2006 and made his debut in the 2–1 home win over Huddersfield Town on 5 August. He left the club by mutual consent on 17 December 2007. He joined Bognor Regis Town in January 2008.

Jupp, who also worked as a football coach at Dorset House School in nearby Pulborough, announced his retirement from football in July 2009. However, in September 2010, he made a comeback and returned to Bognor.

== Honours ==
Southend United

- Football League One: 2005–06
- Football League Two play-offs: 2005
- Football League Trophy runner-up: 2003–04, 2004–05

Individual

- PFA Team of the Year: 1994–95 Third Division, 1995–96 Third Division
