= Aaron Flahavan =

English footballer (1975–2001)

Personal information
- Full name: Aaron Adam Flahavan
- Date of birth: 15 December 1975
- Place of birth: Southampton, England
- Date of death: 5 August 2001 (aged 25)
- Place of death: Bournemouth, England
- Height: 6 ft 1 in (1.85 m)
- Position: Goalkeeper

Youth career
- 1992–1994: Southampton

Senior career*
Years	Team	Apps	(Gls)
1994–2001	Portsmouth	93	(0)
- * Club domestic league appearances and goals

Aaron Adam Flahavan (15 December 1975 – 5 August 2001) was an English footballer who played as a goalkeeper for Portsmouth.

== Career ==
Flahavan played for the Southampton youth team, before turning professional with Portsmouth at age 18 in 1994. He had to wait until 1996 before making his first-team debut as he was understudy to long-serving Alan Knight. Towards the end of the 1990s, Flahavan gradually began receiving increased playing time, and became the team's first-choice goalkeeper by the time Knight retired in 2000. Overall, he played 105 first-team matches for Portsmouth, 93 of them in Division One, and was part of the team which reached the quarter-finals of the FA Cup in the 1996-97 season and just missed out on the Division One playoffs.

Flahavan twice had blackouts during matches; the first was attributed to a virus, and the second to a drop in his blood pressure.

== Personal life and death ==
Flahavan's younger brother, Darryl, also played as a goalkeeper, and had a spell at Aaron's former club Portsmouth between 2010 and 2011. Darryl has a son named Aaron in memory of his brother, who is also a goalkeeper, playing for Bedford Town.

Flahavan died in a car accident near Bournemouth in August 2001. An inquest heard that Flahavan died as a result of a fractured skull, and his blood alcohol level was nearly three times over the legal limit when he lost control of his BMW sports car.

Following his death, Portsmouth and Southampton retired his number 1 jersey for the 2001–02 season as a mark of respect.
