= Garry Cross =

English footballer

Personal information
- Full name: Garry Robert Cross
- Date of birth: 7 October 1980 (age 46)
- Place of birth: Chelmsford, England
- Positions: Right-back; midfielder

Youth career
- Southend United

Senior career*
Years	Team	Apps	(Gls)
1999–2001	Southend United	16	(0)
2001	Slough Town	12	(1)
2001–2005	Chelmsford City		
2005–2006	Thurrock		
2006–2007	AFC Hornchurch		
- * Club domestic league appearances and goals

Garry Robert Cross (born 7 October 1980) is an English former footballer who played as a right-back and a midfielder.

== Career ==
Cross began his career at Southend United, where he came through the club's youth academy. Cross made 16 Football League appearances during his time at the club, before leaving to join Slough Town in January 2001. Cross' time at Slough only lasted for three months, during which he made 13 appearances in all competitions, scoring once. Following his spell at Slough, Cross signed for hometown club Chelmsford City. During his time at Chelmsford, Cross became a fan favourite. On 24 March 2003, Cross scored the third goal in a 5–0 Essex Senior Cup final win against Aveley. Following four years at Chelmsford, Cross had spells with Thurrock and AFC Hornchurch.
