= Barrington Belgrave =

English footballer

Personal information
- Full name: Barrington Belgrave
- Date of birth: 16 September 1980 (age 46)
- Place of birth: Bedford, England
- Height: 5 ft 9 in (1.75 m)
- Position: Striker

Youth career
- 1998–1999: Norwich City

Senior career*
Years	Team	Apps	(Gls)
1999–2000	Plymouth Argyle	15	(0)
2000	→ Yeovil Town (loan)	7	(1)
2000–2001	Yeovil Town	54	(12)
2001–2003	Southend United	55	(8)
2003–2004	Farnborough Town	33	(1)
2004–2005	Lewes	?	(?)
2005–2006	Arlesey Town	?	(?)
2006–2007	Bedford Town	10	(1)
2007	St Neots Town	?	(?)
- * Club domestic league appearances and goals as of 28 November 2007 (UTC)

Barrington Belgrave (born 16 September 1980) is an English footballer, who plays for St Neots Town.

Belgrave made his debut for Southend United in a 0–0 draw with Hartlepool United on 15 September 2001.
