= Tesfaye Bramble =

Footballer (born 1980)

Personal information
- Full name: Tesfaye Walda Simeon Bramble
- Date of birth: 20 July 1980 (age 46)
- Place of birth: Ipswich, England
- Height: 6 ft 2 in (1.88 m)
- Position: Striker

Youth career
- Ipswich Town
- Chelmsford City

Senior career*
Years	Team	Apps	(Gls)
1997–1999	Chelmsford City	30	(3)
2000–2001	Cambridge City	18	(3)
2001	→ Southend United (loan)	0	(0)
2001–2005	Southend United	139	(29)
2005	→ Cambridge United (loan)	9	(3)
2005–2007	Stockport County	68	(11)
2007–2008	Stevenage Borough	11	(1)
2008–2009	Leiston	7	(5)
2009–2010	Felixstowe & Walton United	6	(0)
2013–2014	Hadleigh United	21	(4)
2014	Ipswich Wanderers	1	(0)
Total		310	(59)

International career
2004	Montserrat	1	(1)
- * Club domestic league appearances and goals

Tesfaye Walda Simeon "Tes" Bramble (born 20 July 1980) is a former professional footballer and convicted rapist. He made over 200 appearances in the Football League, scoring 43 goals, between 2001 and 2007. Born in England, he made one international appearance for the Montserrat national team.

== Career ==
Born in Ipswich, England, Bramble is the brother of footballer Titus Bramble. He started his career at Chelmsford City and went to Southern League club Cambridge City before signing for Southend United in January 2001. Manager Dave Webb initially signed Bramble on loan before the deal was made permanent for a fee of £7,000. Bramble made over 150 league and cup appearances, scoring 40 goals, in four-and-a-half seasons at Southend United, and played for Southend in the Football League Trophy final at the Millennium Stadium in March 2004.

During his time at Southend United, Bramble was forced to play in goal against Boston United when goalkeeper Darryl Flahavan was sent off for handball outside the area. He kept a clean sheet for the period he was in goal, making a couple of inspired saves.

Bramble qualifies to play for Montserrat through his maternal grandfather and was called up in November 2004. He made his international debut in a Caribbean Cup qualifier against Antigua and Barbuda in which he scored but was unable to prevent Montserrat losing 5–4.

Bramble spent two months on loan at Cambridge United, where he scored three times in nine games, before being released by Southend United at the end of the 2004–05 season, and joining Stockport County on a two-year contract in June 2005. He made over 70 appearances for Stockport, scoring 12 goals. Bramble was out of contract in the summer of 2007 and signed for Stevenage Borough in July 2007, but was sidelined for two-months following knee surgery in November 2007. He was released at the end of the 2007–08 season, having made 11 Conference National appearances and scoring a one goal. He joined Eastern Counties League Premier Division club Leiston in August 2008. After his release from prison in November 2013 he joined Hadleigh United and made more than 20 appearances for the club as they won the Thurlow Nunn League title. In June 2014, Bramble announced his retirement from football, but he subsequently retained his playing registration with Hadleigh and came on as a second-half substitute in a match on 27 September 2014.

In December 2014, Bramble signed terms with Ipswich Wanderers.

== Personal life ==
In June 2011, Bramble was convicted of rape and sentenced to four and a half years in prison, after a four-day trial at Leeds Crown Court

On 4 November 2013, Bramble was released after serving a two-and-a-half-year sentence.

== Honours ==
Southend United

- Football League Trophy runner-up: 2003–04
