= Neil Jenkins (footballer) =

English footballer

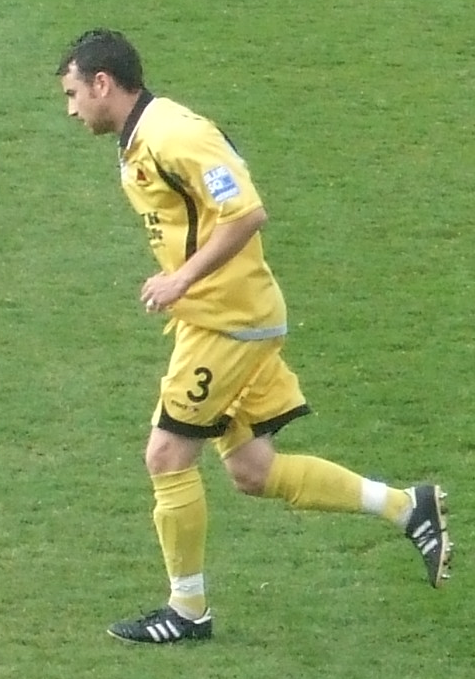
- Jenkins playing for Eastbourne Borough in 2009

Personal information
- Full name: Neil Jenkins
- Date of birth: 6 January 1982 (age 44)
- Place of birth: Carshalton, London, England
- Height: 5 ft 8 in (1.73 m)
- Positions: Defender; midfielder

Senior career*
Years	Team	Apps	(Gls)
2001–2002	Wimbledon	0	(0)
2002–2004	Southend United	61	(8)
2004–2006	Crawley Town	74	(5)
2006–2011	Eastbourne Borough	177	(1)
2011–2012	Sutton United	12	(1)
2012–2013	Hampton and Richmond Borough	14	(0)
2013	Leatherhead		

International career^{‡}
	England U16	7	(0)
	England U18	10	(0)
	England U19	3	(0)
	England U20	4	(0)
- * Club domestic league appearances and goals as of 12:10, 17 June 2015 (UTC) ‡ National team caps and goals as of 00:45, 28 November 2008 (UTC)

Neil Jenkins (born 6 January 1982) is an English former footballer who played as a left footed defender and midfielder. He started his career as a trainee at Wimbledon before transferring to the then Division Three side Southend United for two seasons, then joining the non league team of Crawley Town and later Eastbourne Borough. During his career, Jenkins was capped 24 times for the England national team at U16, U18, U19 and U20 age groups.

== Career ==
=== Southend United ===
Born in Carshalton, London, Jenkins joined the Essex based team Southend United in July 2002, on a one-year contract. He scored in his debut game against Hull City and by the 2002–03 season was one of the top scoring midfielders with seven goals. One of his best goals was against Lincoln City when he took a 25-yard free kick, although the game was lost 2–1. After renewing his contract, he continued to play throughout the 2003–04 season and was released in May 2004 after scoring 8 goals in 61 appearances.

=== Crawley Town ===
In June 2004, Crawley Town manager, Francis Vines, signed Jenkins to boost his squad. In two seasons made 74 appearances and scored five goals and left the club in the summer of 2006.

=== Eastbourne Borough ===
July 2006 saw Garry Wilson signing Jenkins to Eastbourne Borough who was in the Conference South and helped the team win promotion at the end of the 2007–08 season via the play-offs into the Conference National. Jenkins played over 100 games for Eastbourne Borough.

=== Sutton United ===
On 12 May 2011, it was announced that Jenkins would join Sutton United for the 2011–12 season, the club's first season back in the Conference South, after winning promotion in 2010–11.

=== Hampton & Richmond Borough F.C. ===
In February 2012, Jenkins joined Hampton & Richmond Borough F.C. after being released by Sutton United.

=== Leatherhead F.C. ===
In January 2013 Jenkins joined Leatherhead.

== Honours ==
Southend United

- Football League Trophy runner-up: 2003–04
