= Mark Rawle =

English footballer

Personal information
- Full name: Mark Rawle
- Date of birth: 27 April 1979 (age 47)
- Place of birth: Leicester, England
- Height: 5 ft 11 in (1.80 m)
- Position: Striker

Senior career*
Years	Team	Apps	(Gls)
1997–1999	Rushden & Diamonds	15	(1)
1999–2001	Boston United	53	(32)
2001–2003	Southend United	78	(15)
2003–2005	Oxford United	37	(8)
2005	→ Tamworth (loan)	3	(1)
2005	Kidderminster Harriers	11	(3)
2005–2006	Woking	16	(1)
2006	→ Gravesend & Northfleet (loan)	11	(1)
2006–2007	Alfreton Town	29	(13)
2007–2008	Kettering Town	1	(0)
2008	→ Reddich United		(8)
2009	Tamworth	1	(0)
2009–	Brackley Town		
- * Club domestic league appearances and goals

Mark Rawle (born 27 April 1979) is a former professional footballer. His last club was Southern League Premier Division side Brackley Town after being released from Conference North side Tamworth. He played in the Football League for Southend United, Oxford United and Kidderminster Harriers.
