= Kevin Maher =

Footballer (born 1976)

- Maher in 2026

Personal information
- Full name: Kevin Andrew Maher
- Date of birth: 17 October 1976 (age 50)
- Place of birth: Ilford, England
- Height: 6 ft 0 in (1.83 m)
- Position: Midfielder

Youth career
- ?–1995: Tottenham Hotspur

Senior career*
Years	Team	Apps	(Gls)
1995–1998	Tottenham Hotspur	0	(0)
1998–2008	Southend United	383	(22)
2008	→ Gillingham (loan)	7	(0)
2008–2009	Oldham Athletic	31	(1)
2009–2011	Gillingham	62	(0)
2011–2013	Dagenham & Redbridge	16	(0)
2013	Bray Wanderers	6	(0)
2013–2014	Whitehawk	11	(0)
2015	Chelmsford City	0	(0)
Total		517	(23)

International career
1993	Republic of Ireland U17	1	(0)
1997	Republic of Ireland U21	4	(0)

Managerial career
- 2016: Chelmsford City (interim)
- 2019: Bristol Rovers (caretaker)
- 2021–2026: Southend United
- * Club domestic league appearances and goals

Kevin Andrew Maher (born 17 October 1976) is a former professional footballer and coach who played as a midfielder. He was most recently head coach of National League club Southend United. Born in England, he represented the Republic of Ireland internationally at youth levels U17 and U21.

== Club career ==
=== Southend United ===
After beginning his career with Tottenham Hotspur, Maher moved to Southend United on a free transfer on 23 January 1998. He quickly broke into the first team, making 18 appearances for the first-team that season. During the 1998–99 season, Maher scored his first career goal in a 1–1 draw with Rochdale.

Over the next ten years Maher was a virtual ever-present for Southend, rising to be team captain and subsequently club captain. During this time he made more than 400 appearances for the club, and captained Southend to promotion twice, from League Two to the Championship, in successive seasons.

When, during the 2007–08 season it became clear that Maher was no longer an automatic first choice he chose to look for opportunities elsewhere. He left Southend just before he would have become entitled to a testimonial, to join fellow League One side, Gillingham, on loan for the remainder of the season. In his two months with the Kent club, he made seven total appearances but did not score a goal.

=== Oldham Athletic ===
In the summer of 2008, Maher joined Oldham Athletic after he was released by Southend, despite the confidence from Gillingham that he would sign with their club. He immediately signed a one-year contract with the club. On 9 August, he made his debut for Oldham in a 4–3 comeback victory versus Millwall. He later scored his first goal for Oldham on 14 March 2009 versus Milton Keynes Dons. In the 4th minute, he scored from a free kick to give Oldham a 1–0 lead, though the team lost the game 6–2. On 13 May, under new manager Dave Penney, Maher's contract was not renewed, resulting in his release from the club.

=== Gillingham ===
In June 2009, he joined Gillingham on a two-year deal.

=== Dagenham & Redbridge ===
In August 2011 Maher signed for Dagenham & Redbridge. On 7 May 2013, he was released by the Daggers due to the expiry of his contract.

== International career ==
Born in England, Maher was eligible to play for the Republic of Ireland national team, and made four appearances for the Republic of Ireland U21 national team.

== Coaching career ==
In June 2014 Maher was appointed head coach of Chelmsford City. On 14 February 2015, Maher was an unused substitute in the Clarets' 2–0 defeat to Maidenhead United.

In October 2015 Maher returned to Southend in a coaching capacity, assisting the under 21 and youth teams at the club and at the end of November 2015, he was appointed U21 manager of the club. On 20 January 2016, Maher was named as Chelmsford City's caretaker manager after previous manager Mark Hawkes left the club, On 26 February 2016, Maher was appointed Chelmsford City manager until the end of the season, before being replaced by Rod Stringer during the summer break.

=== Bristol Rovers ===
In July 2019, Maher left his position at Southend and joined Bristol Rovers as a first team coach. Following the departure of manager Graham Coughlan, followed by caretaker manager Joe Dunne, Maher was placed in temporary charge of Bristol Rovers, overseeing a 0–0 draw with Peterborough United before Ben Garner was appointed as permanent manager. In January 2020, Maher was again placed in charge of the first-team after manager Garner was granted a period of extended leave for personal reasons.

=== Southend United ===
On 20 October 2021, Maher returned to Southend United, now in the National League, in the role of head coach, replacing Phil Brown. Darren Currie joined him as his assistant and former Southend teammate Mark Bentley joined as first team coach. His opening match as manager ended in disappointment as he saw his side fall to a 3–0 defeat at fifth-placed Dagenham & Redbridge as the hosts scored three goals in six minutes. Maher got a first win in his third game for the club when his side beat bottom side Dover Athletic 4–1 to move out of the relegation zone.

Despite ongoing difficulties off the field, Maher ensured that his side maintained their impressive form. Following five wins from six matches, he was awarded the National League Manager of the Month award for February 2023 with Southend sitting in the play-off positions.

In late October 2023, Maher was linked with the vacant managerial position at Gillingham, but Southend denied the League Two club permission to approach him. Also in October 2023, Maher won a second Manager of the Month award, having accrued 13 points from five matches, conceding just one goal. In December 2023, Maher signed a new "long-term" contract at Southend.

On 17 May 2026, Southend United defeated Wealdstone on penalties to win the 2026 FA Trophy final. Despite their FA Trophy success just two days previously, Southend United parted company with Maher and his coaching staff on 19 May 2026.

== Career statistics ==
Appearances and goals by club, season and competition
Club	Season	League			National cup		League cup		Other		Total	
Club	Season	Division	Apps	Goals	Apps	Goals	Apps	Goals	Apps	Goals	Apps	Goals
Southend United	1997–98	Second Division	18	1	0	0	0	0	0	0	18	1
Southend United	1998–99	Third Division	34	4	1	0	4	0	1 (Note: Appearance(s) in Football League Trophy)	1	40	5
Southend United	1999–2000	Third Division	24	0	0	0	1	0	0	0	25	0
Southend United	2000–01	Third Division	41	2	4	0	2	0	6	0	53	2
Southend United	2001–02	Third Division	36	5	4	0	1	0	1	0	42	5
Southend United	2002–03	Third Division	42	2	4	0	1	0	0	0	47	2
Southend United	2003–04	Third Division	42	1	5	0	1	1	7	0	55	2
Southend United	2004–05	League Two	42	1	1	0	1	0	10 (Note: Seven appearances in Football League Trophy, three appearances in Football League Two play-offs)	0	54	1
Southend United	2005–06	League One	44	1	2	0	1	0	1	0	48	1
Southend United	2006–07	Championship	41	5	3	1	5	0	—		49	6
Southend United	2007–08	League One	19	0	3	0	1	0	0	0	23	0
Southend United	Total		383	22	27	1	18	1	26	1	454	25
Gillingham (loan)	2007–08	League One	7	0	0	0	0	0	0	0	7	0
Oldham Athletic	2008–09	League One	28	1	2	0	1	0	1	0	32	1
Gillingham	2009–10	League One	26	0	2	0	2	0	1	0	31	0
Gillingham	2010–11	League Two	36	0	0	0	1	0	1	0	38	0
Gillingham	Total		62	0	2	0	3	0	2	1	69	0
Dagenham & Redbridge	2011–12	League Two	8	0	1	0	0	0	1	0	10	0
Dagenham & Redbridge	2012–13	League Two	8	0	0	0	0	0	0	0	8	0
Dagenham & Redbridge	Total		16	0	1	0	0	0	1	0	18	0
Bray Wanderers	2013	LOI Premier Division	6	0	0	0	—		2 (Note: Appearances in League of Ireland Premier Division play-offs)	0	8	0
Whitehawk	2013–14	Conference South	11	0	0	0	—		0	0	11	0
Career totals			513	23	32	1	22	1	32	1	599	26

== Managerial statistics ==
As of match played 17 May 2026

Managerial record by team and tenure
Team	From	To	Record				
Team	From	To	P	W	D	L	Win %
Bristol Rovers (caretaker)	21 December 2019	23 December 2019	1	0	1	0	0.0
Southend United	20 October 2021	19 May 2026	243	108	60	75	44.4
Total			244	108	61	75	44.3

== Honours ==
=== As a player ===
Southend United

- Football League One: 2005–06
- Football League Two play-offs: 2005
- Football League Trophy runner-up: 2003–04, 2004–05

Individual

- Southend United Player of the Season: 2000–01, 2006–07
- PFA Team of the Year: 2004–05 League Two, 2005–06 League One

=== As a manager ===
Southend United

- FA Trophy: 2025–26

Individual

- National League Manager of the Month: February 2023, October 2023
