= Steve Tilson =

British footballer (born 1966)

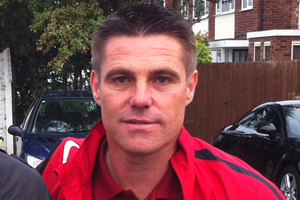
- Tilson in 2011

Personal information
- Full name: Stephen Brian Tilson
- Date of birth: 27 July 1966 (age 60)
- Place of birth: Wickford, England
- Height: 5 ft 11 in (1.80 m)
- Position: Midfielder

Senior career*
Years	Team	Apps	(Gls)
1986–1988	Witham Town		
1988–1998	Southend United	239	(26)
1994	→ Brentford (loan)	2	(0)
1998–2002	Canvey Island	143	(58)
2002–2004	Southend United	4	(0)
Total		388	(84)

Managerial career
- 2003–2010: Southend United
- 2010–2011: Lincoln City
- 2012–2013: Canvey Island
- 2015–2018: C & K Basildon Ladies
- 2021–2024: Heybridge Swifts
- * Club domestic league appearances and goals

Stephen Brian Tilson (born 27 July 1966) is an English football manager and former player.

Tilson is best known for his time in charge of Southend United, where he was in charge for seven years, overseeing two promotions and later two relegations. In 2014, he was voted Southend United's greatest ever player by fans.

== Playing career ==
Born in Wickford, Tilson began his footballing career with non-league sides Basildon United, Bowers United and Witham Town before being signed by then Southend manager David Webb. During the 1990s, Tilson appeared in just under 250 matches and played in the side that won two consecutive promotions in the early part of the decade. Tilson played continually for Southend, except for a loan spell at Brentford, until 1998, when he signed for Canvey Island, serving as club captain during his 4-year spell with the team.

== Coaching and management career ==
=== Southend United ===
In 1999, Tilson returned to Southend United as Director of the club's new centre of excellence, the establishment of which was made possible by a grant of £276,000 from the English Sports Council. The post, which enabled him to continue his playing career with Canvey Island, saw him responsible for overseeing and developing all of the centre's teams, raging from the under-9 to 16. Following the departure of David Webb as Southend United's manager in October 2001 and the promotion of Rob Newman from reserve team manager to first team manager, Tilson's role widened to take on Newman's previous duties with the reserve team. In May 2002, he drew time on his five-year career with Canvey Island to join Newman's backroom team on a full-time basis becoming joint assistant manager with Blues' former striker David Crown.

Tilson worked to develop Southend's youth until the sacking of Steve Wignall in November 2003. With the club in danger of relegation to the Football Conference, Tilson was named caretaker-manager by chairman Ron Martin and proceeded to take Southend clear of danger. Also in the same season, Tilson led Southend to the first ever national cup final in the club's history, losing to Blackpool 2–0 in the Football League Trophy Final. In March 2004 Tilson was offered the job of manager on a full-time basis, and accepted the offer.

In the following two seasons, Tilson took Southend to two consecutive promotions from League Two to the Championship. Southend also reached another Football League Trophy Final in 2005, but lost to Wrexham. Tilson's success saw him linked with jobs at West Bromwich Albion and Norwich City, but he remained with Southend. In November 2006, Southend achieved a notable victory over eventual Premier League champions Manchester United in the League Cup, but were relegated from the Championship at the end of the 2006–07 season.

On 3 January 2009, Tilson led Southend to a 1–1 FA Cup third round draw away at Chelsea, with Peter Clarke scoring a very late birthday equaliser. On 28 October 2009, following the club being threatened with administration and on-loan midfielder Lee Sawyer returning to Chelsea, Tilson came out of retirement to play for Southend in the Essex Senior Cup.

On 4 July 2010, Tilson was placed on gardening leave by Southend United, bringing an end to his seven-year reign as manager.

=== Lincoln City ===
In October 2010, Tilson was appointed the new manager of Lincoln City, replacing Chris Sutton. In his first game Lincoln drew 0–0 but Tilson brought in four promising loan signings, and went on to get a good away result against Wycombe, with many signs of improvement. However, on 7 May 2011, Lincoln were defeated 0–3 by Aldershot, and relegated from the Football League. Following this, he released and transfer listed nearly the whole squad, leaving just 3 players.

Tilson was sacked as manager of Lincoln City on 10 October 2011 following a heavy defeat away at Tamworth.

Tilson now runs a football academy along with former Southend United player Danny Greaves.

=== Canvey Island ===
On 12 July 2012 Tilson was appointed manager of Canvey Island. However, after a season in charge Tilson was sacked along with assistant manager Craig Davidson.

=== Later career ===
Tilson was promoted to the position of manager of women's side C & K Basildon in July 2015, having previously been head coach there. At the time of his appointment the club were in the Southern Division of the FA Women's Premier League.

In 2020, Tilson was in the running to return as Southend United manager but ended up not chosen for the role.

On 3 July 2021, Tilson was named as assistant manager to Julian Dicks at Heybridge Swifts, following Karl Duguid leaving the club. On 24 September 2021, Tilson was appointed the manager of Heybridge Swifts on a permanent basis after the departure of Julian Dicks. In May 2024, Tilson left the club, being replaced by Dicks a week later.

== Managerial statistics ==
As of 10 October 2011

Managerial record by team and tenure
Team	From	To	Record					Ref
Team	From	To	G	W	D	L	Win %	Ref
Southend United	20 November 2003	4 July 2010	358	142	88	128	39.7	
Lincoln City	18 October 2010	10 October 2011	51	14	10	27	27.5	
Total			409	156	98	155	38.1	

== Honours ==
=== Player ===
Canvey Island

- FA Trophy: 2000–01

=== Manager ===
Southend United

- Football League One: 2005–06
- Football League Two play-offs: 2005
- Football League Trophy runner-up: 2003–04, 2004–05

Individual

- Football League One Manager of the Month: September 2005
- Football League Two Manager of the Month: March 2005
