= Darryl Flahavan =

English footballer (born 1978)

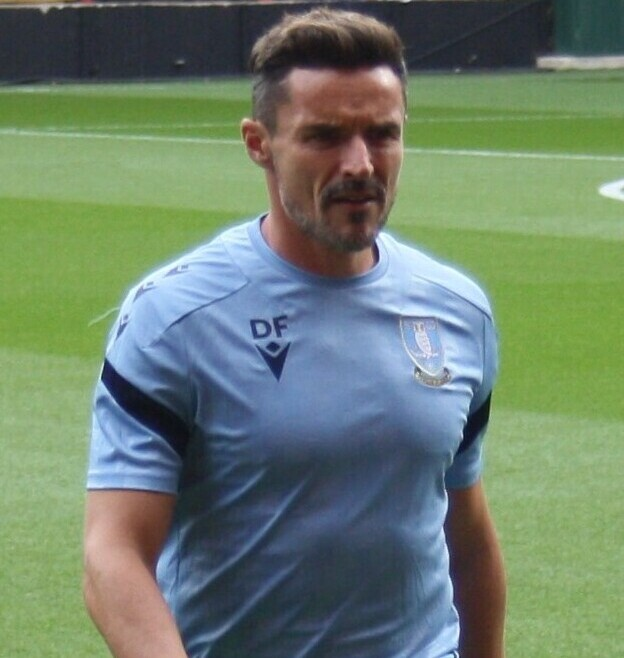
- Flahavan in 2025

Personal information
- Full name: Darryl James Flahavan
- Date of birth: 28 November 1978 (age 47)
- Place of birth: Southampton, England
- Height: 5 ft 11 in (1.80 m)
- Position: Goalkeeper

Team information
- Current team: Sheffield Wednesday (goalkeeping coach)

Youth career
- Southampton

Senior career*
Years	Team	Apps	(Gls)
1996–1998	Southampton	0	(0)
1998–2000	Woking	43	(0)
2000–2008	Southend United	294	(0)
2008–2010	Crystal Palace	2	(0)
2009	→ Leeds United (loan)	0	(0)
2009	→ Oldham Athletic (loan)	7	(0)
2010	→ Oldham Athletic (loan)	11	(0)
2010–2011	Portsmouth	0	(0)
2011–2015	AFC Bournemouth	46	(0)
2015–2016	Crawley Town	13	(0)
Total		417	(0)
- * Club domestic league appearances and goals

Darryl James Flahavan [fla-hay-van] (born 28 November 1978) is an English association football coach and former player who played as a goalkeeper. He is the goalkeeper coach at EFL League One club Sheffield Wednesday.

He has spent most of his career in the Football League, winning the PFA League One player of the year and was named in the League One Team of the Year in 2005–06; he was also named Southend United supporters' player of the year in 2002–03 and Players' Player of the year in 2003–04 and again in 2005–06.

== Club career ==
=== Southampton ===
Flahavan began his career at Southampton. He was named as an unused substitute several times in the Premier League, but did not make a first team appearance, being behind Paul Jones, Dave Beasant and Maik Taylor in the pecking order. He left Saints on a free transfer in 1998, and went on to make his name with Conference side Woking.

=== Southend United ===
He was signed by Southend in October 2000. Flahavan played for Southend during two spells and in total made 356 appearances for the club helping them from League Two into the Championship in back-to-back seasons. Flahavan was seen as one of the main reasons behind the club's rise through the divisions. Flahavan put in a man of the match display against Manchester United in the League Cup on 7 November 2006, making a string of saves from Cristiano Ronaldo and Wayne Rooney. Southend won the game 1–0 with a Freddy Eastwood free kick. Southend were eventually knocked out the competition in the quarter-finals to Tottenham Hotspur at White Hart Lane 1–0 where again Flahavan produced another man of the match display.

=== Crystal Palace ===
Flahavan signed for Championship side Crystal Palace in early July 2008 on a Bosman ruling free transfer, signing a three-year contract to compete for the first team shirt with Julián Speroni. He rejected Southend's offer of a one-year deal. Flahavan made his debut in Palace's 2–1 League Cup win over Hereford United in August 2008. Flahavan also played in the next round against Leeds United, but Palace lost the game 4–0. Flahavan's only league appearance of that season came against Cardiff City and despite saving a penalty, Palace lost the game 2–1. The following season saw Flahavan remain at the club despite speculation linking him with a move away, and he made a first home league appearance for the Eagles in the 0–2 home defeat to Newcastle United, with Speroni ruled out through injury. This proved to be his last appearance for the Eagles.

=== Loan to Leeds United ===
On 26 March 2009, he joined Leeds United on loan until the end of the 2008–09 season, although due to an early injury he did not feature for Leeds United, who also had goalkeepers Casper Ankergren, David Lucas and Alan Martin already at the club.

=== Loan to Oldham Athletic ===
Oldham Athletic signed Flahavan on a month emergency loan in November 2009. Flahavan made his Oldham debut in the FA Cup loss against his former club Leeds United. His loan was later extended until the end of the season, he picked up the Latics' player of the month in April 2010 and went on to play 20 games for the club.

=== Portsmouth ===
On 8 August 2010, Flahavan started training with Portsmouth ahead of a possible move to the club his older brother Aaron played for. On 27 August, Portsmouth signed Flahavan on a one-month deal. He was given the number 37 jersey. Flahavan signed a new one-month deal at Fratton Park on 23 September and then did so again on 26 October. He later extended his contract until the end of the season. Flahavan did not play a single match in the 2010–11 season, as Jamie Ashdown played the full 90 minutes in all 50 of Portsmouth's matches. He left upon the expiration of his contract in June.

=== AFC Bournemouth ===
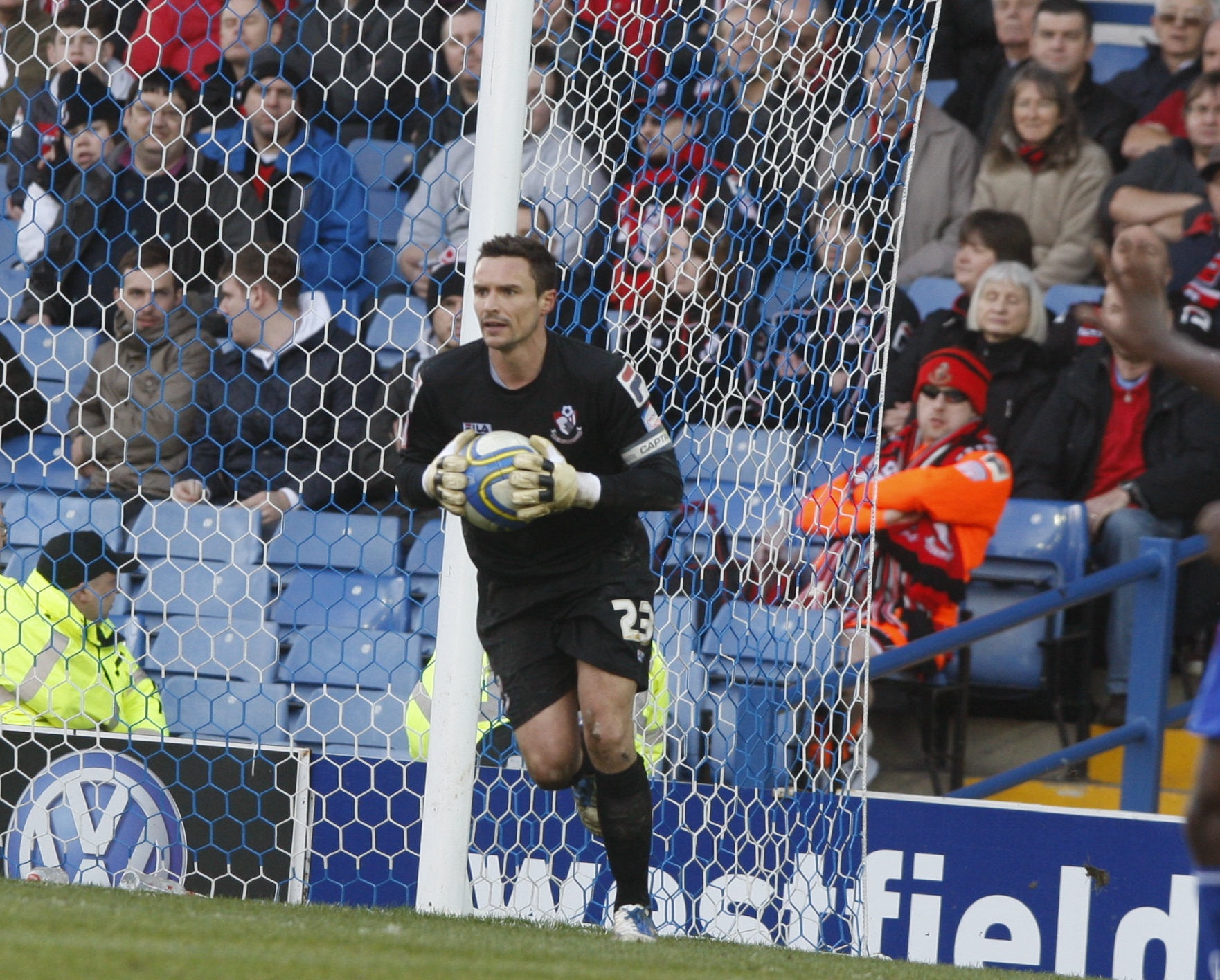
Flahavan playing for AFC Bournemouth in 2013.

On 28 June 2011, Flahavan signed a one-year deal with AFC Bournemouth with a further one-year extension in the club's favour. Flahavan looked forward to working with Lee Bradbury and goalkeeping coach Neil Moss, and was expected to provide competition for Shwan Jalal. He signed a new one-year contract in January 2012. Flahavan played in all but two of Bournemouth's 46 league games in the 2011–12 season. The following season Flahavan picked up a shoulder injury in pre-season which ruled him out of the 2012–13 season.

In May 2013, Flahavan signed a new one-year deal under manager Eddie Howe.

In May 2015, Flahavan left Bournemouth in order to pursue regular first-team football.

=== Crawley Town ===
After his release, Flahavan signed for Crawley Town on a short-term deal. He kept a clean sheet in a 1–0 victory over York City on Halloween. He left Crawley in January 2016.

== Coaching career ==
On 13 June 2016, Flahavan retired from playing when he was appointed the goalkeeper coach of Leeds United as part of the backroom staff to new head coach Garry Monk. Flahavan had a loan spell at Leeds during his playing days and was a former teammate of Monk during his Southampton days.

On 21 June 2017, Flahavan followed Monk to Middlesbrough after Monk resigned as Leeds manager Flahavan was appointed goalkeeping coach of EFL Championship club Birmingham City when Monk took over as manager on 4 March 2018.

On 12 August 2020, he joined Sheffield Wednesday as their goalkeeper coach. He left the club on 9 November 2020, when Garry Monk left the club.

On 25 June 2021, he joined Wigan Athletic as the goalkeeping coach.

On 9 October 2023, Gary White, head coach of Chinese Taipei, mentioned in an interview that Flahavan has been appointed as the new goalkeeper coach of the national team. In his first game, Chinese Taipei took a brilliant 4-0 win against Timor Leste.

On 18 January 2024, he joined Plymouth Argyle as first team goalkeeping coach.

On 3 October 2025, Flahavan rejoined Sheffield Wednesday as their goalkeeper coach for a second time.

== Personal life ==
Flahavan was born in Southampton. Flahavan's older brother Aaron was also a professional football goalkeeper. He played for Portsmouth before dying in a car crash in 2001. Darryl has a son, named Aaron in memory of his brother, who is also a goalkeeper who plays for Bedford Town FC.

== Honours ==
Southend United

- Football League One: 2005–06
- Football League Two play-offs: 2005
- Football League Trophy runner-up: 2003–04, 2004–05

Individual

- PFA Fans' Player of the Year: 2005–06 League One
- PFA Team of the Year: 2005–06 Football League One
