= 2003–04 Football League Trophy =

LDV Vans Trophy

Tournament details
- Country: England; Wales
- Teams: 60

Final positions
- Champions: Blackpool
- Runners-up: Southend United

Tournament statistics
- Matches played: 61

The 2003–04 Football League Trophy, known as the LDV Vans Trophy for sponsorship reasons, was the 23rd season in the history of the competition. A straight knockout competition for English football clubs in the third and fourth tiers of the English football league system.

In all, 60 clubs entered the competition, including twelve from the Conference National. It was split into two sections, Northern and Southern, with the winners of each section contesting the final at the Millennium Stadium, Cardiff. The competition began on 13 October 2003 and concluded on 21 March 2004.

The winners were Blackpool, who defeated Southend United 2–0 to win the title for a second time.

== First round ==
Four clubs received a bye into the Second Round. Bury and Huddersfield Town in the Northern section, and Northampton Town and Swansea City in the Southern section.

=== Northern section ===
Tie no.	Home team	Score	Away team	Attendance
1	Blackpool	3–2 Archived 2004-12-21 at the Wayback Machine	Tranmere Rovers	2,838
2	Carlisle United	2–0 Archived 2004-12-21 at the Wayback Machine	Rochdale	1,828
3	Chester City	0–1 Archived 2004-12-21 at the Wayback Machine	Doncaster Rovers	1,141
4	Chesterfield	2–1 Archived 2004-12-21 at the Wayback Machine	Macclesfield Town	1,631
5	Darlington	1–3 Archived 2004-12-21 at the Wayback Machine	Hull City	1,578
6	Halifax Town	2–1 Archived 2004-12-21 at the Wayback Machine	York City	1,148
7	Lincoln City	3–1 Archived 2004-12-21 at the Wayback Machine	Telford United	1,503
8	Mansfield Town	1–2 Archived 2004-12-21 at the Wayback Machine	Stockport County	3,718
9	Oldham Athletic	3–3 Archived 2004-12-21 at the Wayback Machine	Hartlepool United	3,575
Oldham Athletic won 5–3 on penalties
10	Scarborough	2–1 Archived 2004-12-21 at the Wayback Machine	Port Vale	1,003
11	Scunthorpe United	2–1 Archived 2004-12-21 at the Wayback Machine	Shrewsbury Town	1,265
12	Wrexham	4–1 Archived 2004-12-21 at the Wayback Machine	Morecambe	1,078
13	Notts County	0–0 Archived 2004-12-21 at the Wayback Machine	Barnsley	1,220
Barnsley won 4–2 on penalties
14	Sheffield Wednesday	1–1 Archived 2004-12-21 at the Wayback Machine	Grimsby Town	7,323
Sheffield Wednesday won 5–4 on penalties

=== Southern section ===
Tie no.	Home team	Score	Away team	Attendance
1	Brighton & Hove Albion	2–0 Archived 2004-12-21 at the Wayback Machine	Forest Green Rovers	3,969
2	Barnet	3–3 Archived 2004-12-20 at the Wayback Machine	Brentford	1,248
Brentford won 3–1 on penalties
3	Cheltenham Town	1–3 Archived 2004-12-21 at the Wayback Machine	Colchester United	1,324
4	Peterborough United	3–2 Archived 2004-12-21 at the Wayback Machine	Torquay United	1,980
5	Plymouth Argyle	4–0 Archived 2004-12-21 at the Wayback Machine	Bristol City	4,927
6	Queens Park Rangers	2–0 Archived 2004-12-21 at the Wayback Machine	Kidderminster Harriers	3,671
7	Southend United	2–1 Archived 2004-12-21 at the Wayback Machine	Bristol Rovers	1,714
8	Stevenage Borough	0–1 Archived 2004-12-21 at the Wayback Machine	Luton Town	1,754
9	Wycombe Wanderers	1–0 Archived 2004-12-21 at the Wayback Machine	Cambridge United	977
10	Yeovil Town	2–0 Archived 2004-12-21 at the Wayback Machine	Bournemouth	5,035
11	Boston United	2–1 Archived 2004-12-20 at the Wayback Machine	Swindon Town	1,514
12	Dagenham & Redbridge	4–1 Archived 2004-12-20 at the Wayback Machine	Leyton Orient	1,857
13	Oxford United	0–1 Archived 2004-12-20 at the Wayback Machine	Rushden & Diamonds	2,510
14	Hereford United	2–0 Archived 2004-12-20 at the Wayback Machine	Exeter City	1,513

== Second round ==
=== Northern section ===
Tie no.	Home team	Score	Away team	Attendance
1	Bury	2–1 Archived 2004-12-21 at the Wayback Machine	Oldham Athletic	3,102
2	Blackpool	1–0 Archived 2004-12-21 at the Wayback Machine	Doncaster Rovers	2,954
3	Carlisle United	2–0 Archived 2004-12-21 at the Wayback Machine	Huddersfield Town	1,346
4	Hull City	1–3 Archived 2004-12-21 at the Wayback Machine	Scunthorpe United	6,656
5	Lincoln City	4–3 Archived 2004-12-21 at the Wayback Machine	Chesterfield	2,395
6	Scarborough	0–1 Archived 2004-12-21 at the Wayback Machine	Halifax Town	899
7	Stockport County	5–4	Wrexham	1,469
8	Sheffield Wednesday	1–0 Archived 2004-12-21 at the Wayback Machine	Barnsley	13,575

=== Southern section ===
Tie no.	Home team	Score	Away team	Attendance
1	Brighton & Hove Albion	3–1 Archived 2004-12-21 at the Wayback Machine	Boston United	4,026
2	Hereford United	1–1 Archived 2004-12-21 at the Wayback Machine	Northampton Town	1,517
Northampton Town won 4–3 on penalties
3	Peterborough United	3–2	Brentford	1,821
4	Plymouth Argyle	2–2 Archived 2004-12-21 at the Wayback Machine	Wycombe Wanderers	4,298
Wycombe Wanderers won 4–2 on penalties
5	Queens Park Rangers	2–1 Archived 2004-12-21 at the Wayback Machine	Dagenham & Redbridge	3,036
6	Rushden & Diamonds	1–2 Archived 2004-12-21 at the Wayback Machine	Luton Town	2,746
7	Swansea City	1–2 Archived 2004-12-21 at the Wayback Machine	Southend United	2,055
8	Yeovil Town	2–2 Archived 2004-12-21 at the Wayback Machine	Colchester United	3,052
Colchester United won 4–2 on penalties

== Quarter finals ==
=== Northern section ===
Tie no.	Home team	Score	Away team	Attendance
1	Bury	0–1 Archived 2004-10-20 at the Wayback Machine	Scunthorpe United	1,246
2	Carlisle United	0–3 Archived 2004-10-20 at the Wayback Machine	Sheffield Wednesday	2,869
3	Stockport County	0–1 Archived 2004-12-21 at the Wayback Machine	Blackpool	2,337
4	Halifax Town	1–0 Archived 2004-12-21 at the Wayback Machine	Lincoln City	1,162

=== Southern section ===
Tie no.	Home team	Score	Away team	Attendance
1	Queens Park Rangers	2–1 Archived 2004-12-21 at the Wayback Machine	Brighton & Hove Albion	7,536
2	Northampton Town	2–1 Archived 2004-10-20 at the Wayback Machine	Peterborough United	4,290
3	Southend United	3–0 Archived 2004-10-20 at the Wayback Machine	Luton Town	2,027
4	Wycombe Wanderers	2–3 Archived 2004-10-20 at the Wayback Machine	Colchester United	1,873

== Semi finals ==
=== Northern section ===
Tie no.	Home team	Score	Away team	Attendance
1	Blackpool	3–2 Archived 2004-12-21 at the Wayback Machine	Halifax Town	4,764
2	Sheffield Wednesday	4–0 Archived 2004-12-21 at the Wayback Machine	Scunthorpe United	10,236

=== Southern section ===
Tie no.	Home team	Score	Away team	Attendance
1	Northampton Town	2–3 Archived 2004-12-21 at the Wayback Machine	Colchester United	4,034
2	Southend United	4–0 Archived 2004-12-21 at the Wayback Machine	Queens Park Rangers	5,824

== Area Finals ==
=== Northern section ===
10 February 2004 First Leg	Blackpool	1 – 0	Sheffield Wednesday	Bloomfield Road, Blackpool
19:45 GMT	Taylor 82'	Report		Attendance: 7,482; Referee: Mike Jones (Cheshire)

25 February 2004 Second Leg	Sheffield Wednesday	0 – 2	Blackpool	Hillsborough, Sheffield
19:45 GMT		Report	Sheron 20'; Southern 31'	Attendance: 21,390; Referee: Mike Pike (Lancashire)

=== Southern Section ===
10 February 2004 First Leg	Colchester United	2 – 3	Southend United	Layer Road, Colchester
19:45 GMT	Pinault 7'; Andrews 75'	Report	Constantine 17'; Broughton 42'; Bramble 68'	Attendance: 5,401; Referee: Graham Laws (Tyne & Wear)

17 February 2004 Second Leg	Southend United	1 – 1	Colchester United	Roots Hall, Southend
19:45 GMT	Broughton 45'	Report	Izzet 3'	Attendance: 9,603; Referee: Michael Ryan (Lancashire)

== Final ==
21 March 2004
13:00 GMT

Blackpool	2 – 0	Southend United
Murphy 2'; Coid 55'	Report

Millennium Stadium, Cardiff
Attendance: 34,031
Referee: Roy Pearson (County Durham)
