= 2010–11 Crawley Town F.C. season =

Crawley Town
2010–11 season
- Chairman: Victor Marley
- Manager: Steve Evans
- Conference National: 1st (promoted)
- FA Cup: Fifth round
- FA Trophy: First round
- Sussex Senior Cup: Second round
- Top goalscorer: League: Matt Tubbs (37); All: Matt Tubbs (40)
- Highest home attendance: 4,108 vs Derby County, FA Cup, 10 January 2011
- Lowest home attendance: 1,300

The 2010–11 season was the 61st season in which Crawley Town played senior football, and their seventh in the Football Conference. On 1 July 2010, following a number of signings, the club held a press conference to declare their intentions for the coming season. They confirmed that the club had cleared £1,000,000 of debt and was now debt-free, and that Bruce Winfield has bought the shareholding formerly held by the Prospect Estates group. On 9 April, Crawley won the Conference National, beating Tamworth 3–0, and by doing this they will be a Football League club for the first time in their history.

== Season summary ==
Prior to the beginning of the season, the club spent around £600,000 on players, signing the likes of Matt Tubbs from Salisbury City, Sergio Torres from Peterborough United and Richard Brodie from York City for a non-league record fee, financed in part by anonymous Far Eastern investors. The club saw success in the league losing just thrice all season before being promoted to the Football League for the first time in their history on 9 April 2011 following a 3–0 victory away to Tamworth. They finished top of the league on 105 points, a division record. The club also saw success in the FA Cup, reaching the fifth round of the competition before being eliminated by eventual Premier League champions and FA Cup semi-finalists Manchester United.

In 2017, football magazine FourFourTwo rated the Crawley Town team of the 2010–11 season the 21st most hated team of all time in British football, as a result of the club's significant financial backing and their unpopular manager Steve Evans, who was found guilty of tax evasion at his previous club Boston United. Due to the club's significant financial backing from anonymous foreign investors, they were referred to as the 'Manchester City' of non-league football. The anonymous owner was later revealed to be Hong-Kong-based Paul Hayward.

== Match results ==
Crawley Town results given first

=== Legend ===
| Win | Draw | Loss |

=== Friendlies ===
| Date | Opponent | Venue | Result | Attendance | Scorers | Notes |
|---|---|---|---|---|---|---|
| 10 July 2010 | Millwall | Home | 1–1 | 1030 | Quinn | |
| 13 July 2010 | Crystal Palace | Home | 1–0 | 1447 | Tubbs | |
| 16 July 2010 | Dorchester Town | Away | 6–0 | | Quinn, Enver-Marum (3), Coward (own goal), Napper | |
| 17 July 2010 | Weymouth | Away | 2–0 | 455 | McAllister (2 (1 penalty)) | |
| 20 July 2010 | Arsenal XI | Home | 2–2 | 1150 | Wilson, Tubbs | |
| 24 July 2010 | Chelsea XI | Home | 3–0 | 813 | Hall, Tubbs, Malcolm | |
| 28 July 2010 | Queens Park Rangers | Home | 2–0 | 1110 | Tubbs (2) | |
| 31 July 2010 | St. Albans City | Away | 0–0 | 122 | — | |
| 7 August 2010 | Bromley | Away | 0–1 | | — | |
| 7 September 2010 | Three Bridges | Away | 7–0 | | | |

=== Conference National ===
| Date | Opponent | Venue | Result | Attendance | Scorers | Notes |
|---|---|---|---|---|---|---|
| 14 August 2010 | Grimsby Town | Home | 0–1 | 2428 | | |
| 17 August 2010 | Cambridge United | Away | 2–2 | 2558 | Tubbs (2) | |
| 21 August 2010 | Altrincham | Away | 1–0 | 776 | Masterton | |
| 24 August 2010 | Bath City | Home | 2–1 | 1,252 | Tubbs, McAllister(pen) | |
| 28 August 2010 | Hayes & Yeading United | Away | 3–0 | 320 | McAllister (2) Torres | |
| 30 August 2010 | Forest Green Rovers | Home | 1–0 | 1,458 | Tubbs | |
| 4 September 2010 | Fleetwood Town | Home | 1–1 | 1,637 | McAllister | |
| 11 September 2010 | Histon | Away | 2–0 | 497 | McFadzean, Brodie | |
| 18 September 2010 | Gateshead | Home | 2–1 | 1,412 | Tubbs (2) | |
| 21 September 2010 | AFC Wimbledon | Away | 1–2 | 4,018 | Tubbs | |
| 25 September 2010 | Rushden & Diamonds | Away | 1–0 | 1,162 | Tubbs | |
| 28 September 2010 | Tamworth | Home | 3–1 | 1,355 | Tubbs (2) Smith | |
| 2 October 2010 | Kidderminster Harriers | Home | 2–0 | 1,483 | McAllister, Neilson | |
| 5 October 2010 | Luton Town | Away | 2–1 | 6,895 | Brodie, McAllister | |
| 9 October 2010 | Barrow | Away | 1–1 | 1,155 | Tubbs | |
| 16 October 2010 | Newport County | Home | 2–3 | 2,566 | Brodie, Neilson | |
| 30 October 2010 | Mansfield Town | Away | 4–1 | 2,615 | Bulman McAllister (2) Tubbs | |
| 13 November 2010 | Darlington | Away | 1–1 | 2,012 | Neilson | |
| 20 November 2010 | Altrincham | Home | 7–0 | 1,331 | Tubbs (3) Brodie (2) Torres, Neilson | |
| 1 January 2011 | Eastbourne Borough | Home | 3–1 | 1,894 | Smith, Tubbs (2) | |
| 3 January 2011 | Forest Green Rovers | Away | 3–0 | 1,027 | McAllister Tubbs (2) | |
| 15 January 2011 | Kettering Town | Home | 2–1 | 1,812 | Tubbs, Brodie | |
| 18 January 2011 | Bath City | Away | 2–0 | 836 | Tubbs (2) | |
| 22 January 2011 | Grimsby Town | Away | 0–0 | 3,382 | | |
| 25 January 2011 | Cambridge United | Home | 3–0 | 3,241 | McAllister (2) Cook | |
| 3 February 2011 | Kettering Town | Away | 0–0 | 1,216 | | |
| 12 February 2011 | Wrexham | Home | 3–2 | 3,331 | Tubbs (3) | |
| 15 February 2011 | Wrexham | Away | 0–0 | 4,630 | | |
| 22 February 2011 | Southport | Home | 1–0 | 3,721 | Mills | |
| 26 February 2011 | Barrow | Home | 3–2 | 3,941 | Brodie, McAllister, Mills | |
| 5 March 2011 | Histon | Home | 5–0 | 3,031 | Tubbs, Smith, Simpson, Hunt, Gibson | |
| 8 March 2011 | Kidderminster Harriers | Away | 0–0 | 1,816 | | |
| 12 March 2011 | Fleetwood Town | Away | 2–1 | 2,027 | Brodie, Tubbs | |
| 15 March 2011 | Hayes & Yeading United | Home | 5–2 | 2,236 | Dempster, Simpson, Tubbs (2), Mills | |
| 18 March 2011 | AFC Wimbledon | Home | 3–1 | 4,054 | Tubbs, McFadzean, Dance | |
| 22 March 2011 | Eastbourne Borough | Away | 2–1 | 2,054 | Wassmer, Torres | |
| 26 March 2011 | Gateshead | Away | 0–0 | 751 | | |
| 29 March 2011 | Mansfield Town | Home | 2–0 | 3,162 | McFadzean, Tubbs | |
| 2 April 2011 | Darlington | Home | 1–0 | 3,554 | Smith | |
| 5 April 2011 | York City | Away | 1–1 | 3,060 | Torres | |
| 9 April 2011 | Tamworth | Away | 3–0 | 1,569 | Tubbs (2) Wassmer | C |
| 12 April 2011 | Luton Town | Home | 1–1 | 3,326 | Brodie | |
| 16 April 2011 | Southport | Away | 4–0 | 1,011 | Brodie (2), Neilson, Simpson | |
| 22 April 2011 | Rushden & Diamonds | Home | 4–0 | 3,083 | Cook, Tubbs (3) | |
| 25 April 2011 | Newport County | Away | 1–0 | 2,026 | Howell | |
| 30 April 2011 | York City | Home | 1–1 | 2,945 | Tubbs | |

=== FA Cup ===
| Round | Date | Opponent | Venue | Result | Attendance | Scorers | Notes |
|---|---|---|---|---|---|---|---|
| 4Q | 23 October 2010 | Newport County | Away | 1–0 | 2,274 | Craig McAllister | |
| 1R | 6 November 2010 | Guiseley AFC | Away | 5–0 | | Matt Tubbs, Scott Neilson, Danny Hall, Richard Brodie, Sergio Torres | |
| 2R | 26 November 2010 | Swindon Town | Home | 1–1 | 3,895 | Matt Tubbs | |
| 2RR | 7 December 2010 | Swindon Town | Away | 3–2 AET | 2,995 | Ben Smith, Michael Rose (OG), Ben Smith | |
| 3R | 10 January 2011 | Derby County | Home | 2–1 | 4,145 | Craig McAllister, Sergio Torres | |
| 4R | 29 January 2011 | Torquay United | Away | 1–0 | 5,065 | Matt Tubbs | |
| 5R | 19 February 2011 | Manchester United | Away | 0–1 | 74,778 | | |

=== FA Trophy ===
| Round | Date | Opponent | Venue | Result | Attendance | Scorers | Notes |
|---|---|---|---|---|---|---|---|
| 1 | 11 December 2010 | Dartford | Home | 3–3 | 1,031 | Brodie, Mcallister, Howell | |
| 1R | 14 December 2010 | Dartford | Away | 0–1 | 605 | | |

=== Sussex Senior Cup ===
| Round | Date | Opponent | Venue | Result | Attendance | Scorers | Notes |
|---|---|---|---|---|---|---|---|
| 2 | 16 November 2010 | Horsham | Away | 0–2 | 180 | – | |

== Player statistics ==
Correct as of 23 April 2011. Players with a zero in every column only appeared as unused substitutes.

| No. | Pos. | Name | League | | FA Cup | | FA Trophy | | Total | | Discipline | |
| No. | Pos. | Name | Apps | Goals | Apps | Goals | Apps | Goals | Apps | Goals | Yellow card | Red card |
|---|---|---|---|---|---|---|---|---|---|---|---|---|
| 1 | GK | Michel Kuipers | 26 | 0 | 6 | 0 | 1 | 0 | 33 | 0 | 1 | 2 |
| 2 | MF | Simon Rusk | 9 (7) | 0 | 0 (1) | 0 | 0 | 0 | 9 (8) | 0 | 2 | 0 |
| 3 | DF | Sam Rents | 4 (1) | 0 | 2 (1) | 0 | 2 | 0 | 8 (2) | 0 | 0 | 0 |
| 4 | MF | Eddie Hutchinson | 1 (1) | 0 | 0 | 0 | 0 | 0 | 1 (1) | 0 | 0 | 0 |
| 4 | MF | David Hunt | 22 (3) | 1 | 1 (2) | 0 | 0 | 0 | 23 (5) | 1 | 5 | 0 |
| 5 | DF | Adam Quinn | 11 (1) | 0 | 0 | 0 | 0 | 0 | 11 (1) | 0 | 1 | 0 |
| 5 | DF | John Dempster | 8 (2) | 1 | 0 | 0 | 0 | 0 | 8 (2) | 1 | 3 | 0 |
| 6 | DF | Danny Hall | 9 (5) | 0 | 1 (1) | 1 | 2 | 0 | 12 (5) | 1 | 3 | 0 |
| 7 | MF | Ben Smith | 22 (7) | 4 | 6 (1) | 2 | 0 | 0 | 28 (8) | 6 | 2 | 0 |
| 8 | MF | Sergio Torres | 34 (5) | 4 | 6 (1) | 2 | 1 (1) | 0 | 40 (7) | 6 | 7 | 0 |
| 9 | FW | Matt Tubbs | 38 (3) | 37 | 6 | 3 | 1 | 0 | 45 (3) | 40 | 5 | 0 |
| 10 | FW | Liam Enver-Marum | 1 (2) | 0 | 0 | 0 | 0 | 0 | 1 (2) | 0 | 0 | 0 |
| 10 | MF | Josh Simpson | 21 (6) | 3 | 0 | 0 | 0 | 0 | 21 (6) | 3 | 1 | 0 |
| 11 | MF | Steve Masterton | 12 (1) | 1 | 2 | 0 | 2 | 0 | 16 (1) | 1 | 3 | 0 |
| 12 | GK | Nick Jordan | 5 (2) | 0 | 0 | 0 | 1 | 0 | 6 (2) | 0 | 0 | 0 |
| 14 | FW | Craig McAllister | 28 (13) | 12 | 6 (1) | 2 | 1 (1) | 1 | 35 (15) | 15 | 0 | 0 |
| 15 | DF | Darragh Ryan | 0 | 0 | 0 | 0 | 0 | 0 | 0 | 0 | 0 | 0 |
| 15 | MF | Dannie Bulman | 31 | 1 | 7 | 0 | 1 | 0 | 39 | 1 | 1 | 1 |
| 16 | DF | Glenn Wilson | 32 (7) | 0 | 6 | 0 | 2 | 0 | 40 (7) | 0 | 4 | 0 |
| 17 | MF | Barry Cogan | 2 (1) | 0 | 0 | 0 | 0 | 0 | 2 (1) | 0 | 0 | 0 |
| 17 | MF | Willie Gibson | 11 (3) | 1 | 1 | 0 | 0 | 0 | 12 (3) | 1 | 3 | 0 |
| 18 | FW | Jamie Cook | 6 (15) | 2 | 1 (5) | 0 | 1 | 0 | 8 (20) | 2 | 0 | 0 |
| 19 | MF | Michael Malcolm | 0 (3) | 0 | 0 | 0 | 0 | 0 | 0 (3) | 0 | 0 | 0 |
| 19 | MF | James Dance | 2 (5) | 1 | 0 | 0 | 0 | 0 | 2 (5) | 1 | 1 | 0 |
| 20 | MF | Chris Flood | 0 (3) | 0 | 0 | 0 | 1 | 0 | 1 (3) | 0 | 0 | 0 |
| 20 | DF | Charlie Wassmer | 10 (2) | 2 | 0 | 0 | 0 | 0 | 10 (2) | 2 | 5 | 1 |
| 21 | MF | Byron Napper | 0 | 0 | 0 | 0 | 0 | 0 | 0 | 0 | 0 | 0 |
| 22 | MF | Pablo Mills | 32 | 3 | 7 | 0 | 1 | 0 | 40 | 3 | 8 | 0 |
| 23 | DF | Dean Howell | 35 | 1 | 7 | 0 | 1 (1) | 1 | 42 (2) | 1 | 3 | 1 |
| 24 | MF | Jai Reason | 0 (4) | 0 | 0 | 0 | 0 | 0 | 0 (4) | 0 | 1 | 0 |
| 26 | MF | Scott Neilson | 24 (3) | 5 | 5 | 1 | 0 (1) | 0 | 29 (4) | 6 | 6 | 0 |
| 27 | DF | Kyle McFadzean | 34 (3) | 3 | 7 | 0 | 1 | 0 | 42 | 3 | 9 | 1 |
| 29 | FW | Richard Brodie | 25 (13) | 11 | 1 (5) | 1 | 1 | 1 | 27 (18) | 13 | 9 | 0 |
| 30 | GK | Scott Shearer | 15 (1) | 0 | 0 | 0 | 0 | 0 | 15 (1) | 0 | 0 | 0 |

== Annual awards ==
=== Crawley News Player of the Year ===
Matt Tubbs

=== Crawley Observer Player of the Year ===
Pablo Mills

=== Crawley Observer Young Player of the Year ===
Kyle McFadzean

=== CTFC.net Player of the Year ===
Kyle McFadzean

== Transfers ==
=== In ===
| Date | Position | Name | Previous club (Note: Brackets around club names denote the player's contract with that club had expired before he joined Crawley) | Fee | Ref. |
|---|---|---|---|---|---|
| 19 May 2010 | GK | Michel Kuipers | (Brighton & Hove Albion) | Free | |
| 26 May 2010 | DF | Danny Hall | (Chesterfield) | Free | |
| 3 June 2010 | MF | Steven Masterton | (Greenock Morton) | Free | |
| 23 June 2010 | FW | Liam Enver Marum | (Eastbourne Borough) | Free | |
| 23 June 2010 | MF | Darragh Ryan | (Stevenage Borough) | Free | |
| 28 June 2010 | FW | Craig McAllister | (Exeter City) | Free | |
| 29 June 2010 | FW | Jamie Cook | (Oxford United) | Free | |
| 1 July 2010 | FW | Matt Tubbs | Salisbury City | £70,000 | |
| 2 July 2010 | FW | Michael Malcolm | (Weymouth) | Free | |
| 6 July 2010 | DF | Pablo Mills | (Rotherham United) | Free | |
| 8 July 2010 | MF | Sergio Torres | Peterborough United | £100,000+ | |
| 22 July 2010 | MF | Chris Flood | Salisbury City | £10,000 | |
| 22 July 2010 | DF | Dean Howell | (Aldershot Town) | Free | |
| 16 August 2010 | MF | Scott Neilson | Bradford City | Undisclosed | |
| 17 July 2010 | MF | Jai Reason | (Cambridge United) | Free | |
| 14 August 2010 | DF | Kyle McFadzean | Alfreton Town | Undisclosed | |
| 30 August 2010 | FW | Richard Brodie | York City | £150,000 | |
| 30 December 2010 | MF | Dannie Bulman | Oxford United | Free | |
| 31 December 2010 | MF | Josh Simpson | Peterborough United | Undisclosed | |
| 1 January 2011 | GK | Scott Shearer | Wrexham | Free | |
| 5 January 2011 | DF | John Dempster | Kettering Town | Undisclosed | |
| 14 January 2011 | MF | James Dance | Kettering Town | Undisclosed | |
| 31 January 2011 | DF | Willie Gibson | Dunfermline Athletic | Undisclosed | |

=== Out ===
| Date | Position | Name | Subsequent club (Note: Brackets around club names denote the player joined that club after his contract with Crawley expired) | Fee | Ref. |
|---|---|---|---|---|---|
| 10 May 2010 | FW | Jefferson Louis | (Gainsborough Trinity) | Mutual consent | |
| 14 May 2010 | FW | Danny Forrest | (Barrow) | Declined terms | |
| 14 May 2010 | FW | Lewis Killeen | (Droylsden) | Declined terms | |
| 14 May 2010 | FW | Michael Malcolm | (Farnborough) | Declined terms | |
| 2 July 2010 | FW | Charles Ademeno | Grimsby Town | £10,000 | |
| 6 September 2010 | MF | Darragh Ryan | (Southern Stars) | Mutual consent | |
| 22 September 2010 | MF | Jai Reason | (Braintree Town) | Mutual consent | |
| 8 November 2010 | MF | Eddie Hutchinson | (Eastbourne Borough) | Mutual consent | |
| 16 November 2010 | FW | Liam Enver-Marum | (Ebbsfleet United) | Mutual consent | |
| 16 November 2010 | FW | Barry Cogan | (Dover Athletic) | Mutual consent | |
| 7 January 2011 | DF | Adam Quinn | Darlington | Undisclosed | |
| 11 February 2011 | MF | Chris Flood | Dorchester Town | Undisclosed | |

== See also ==
- 2010–11 Football Conference
- 2010–11 in English football
