= Sergio Torres (footballer, born 1981) =

Argentine footballer (born 1981)

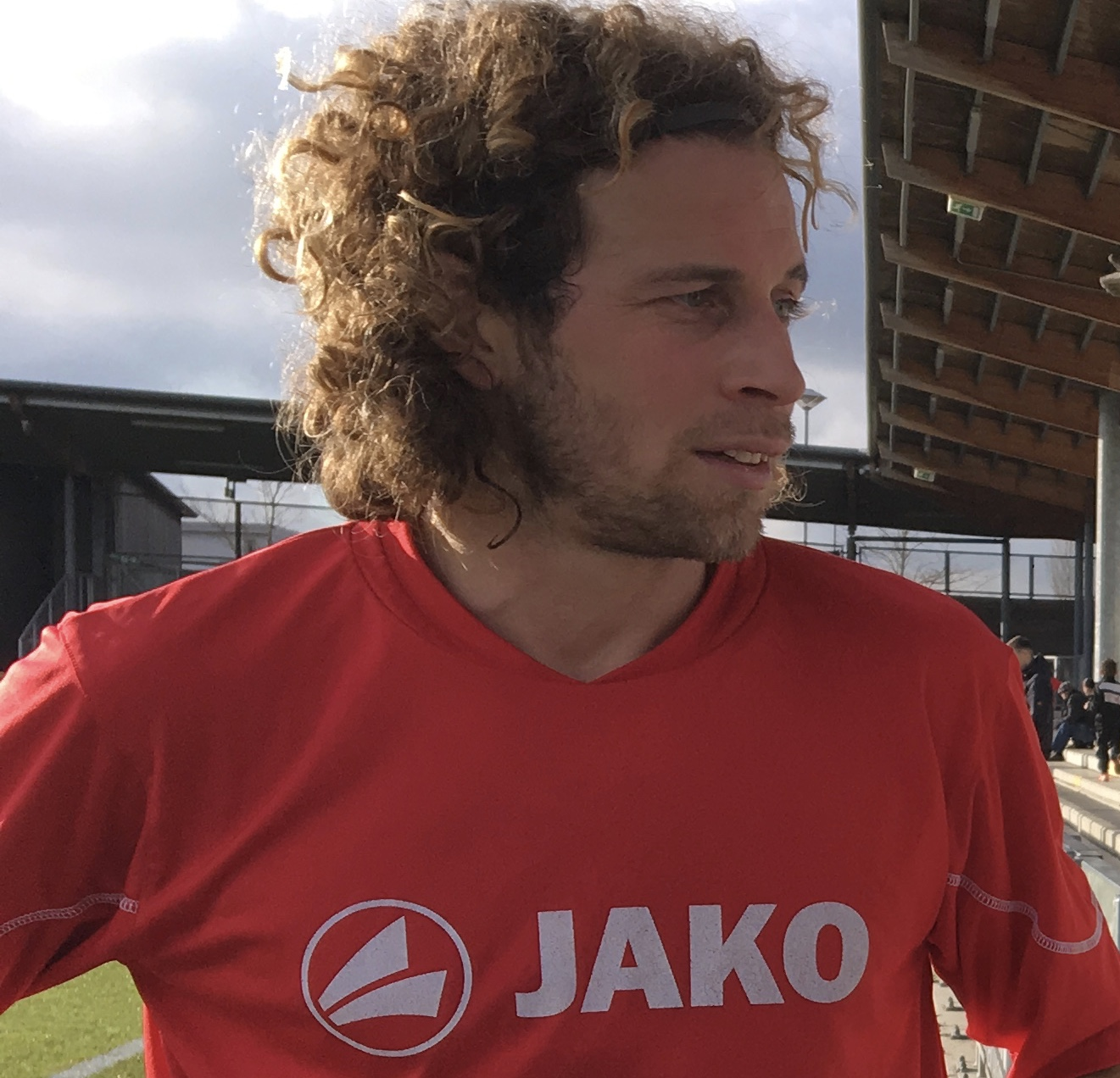
- Torres at Dartford in February 2017.

Personal information
- Full name: Sergio Raul Torres
- Date of birth: 11 July 1981 (age 45)
- Place of birth: Mar del Plata, Argentina
- Height: 1.80 m (5 ft 11 in)
- Position: Midfielder

Youth career
- Quilmes de Mar del Plata

Senior career*
Years	Team	Apps	(Gls)
2001–2002	Quilmes de Mar del Plata	6	(0)
2002–2004	Banfield de Mar del Plata	8	(1)
2004	Molesey		
2004–2005	Basingstoke Town	61	(8)
2005–2008	Wycombe Wanderers	88	(6)
2008–2010	Peterborough United	24	(1)
2009–2010	→ Lincoln City (loan)	8	(1)
2010–2014	Crawley Town	122	(7)
2014–2017	Whitehawk	101	(4)
2017–2020	Eastbourne Borough	86	(5)

Managerial career
- 2019: Eastbourne Borough (caretaker)
- 2019–2021: Eastbourne Borough (assistant)
- * Club domestic league appearances and goals as of 16:30, 5 November 2019 (UTC)

Sergio Raul Torres (born 11 July 1981) is an Argentine football coach and former player. During his playing career he played in his native Argentina as well as in the English Football League for Wycombe Wanderers, Peterborough United and Crawley Town.

== Club career ==
=== Early career ===
Torres was born in Mar del Plata. After a two-month trial with Boca Juniors aged 15, Torres began his career in Argentina at Quilmes de Mar del Plata and later Club Atlético Banfield in his native city of Mar del Plata playing part-time while working in the family brick factory and training to become a PE teacher. In November 2003, he decided to leave the club and fund his own trip to England in the hope of playing professionally; Torres arrived in England with just £180 and stayed in a shared a house in Norbury, London owned by his agent. Then Brighton & Hove Albion manager Mark McGhee offered him a two-week trial after seeing a highlights video, though he was rejected with McGhee telling Torres that he "would never make it in England".

He subsequently signed for Isthmian League side Molesey in late 2003 alongside fellow Argentinian Cristian Levis after a friend put them into contact with the Molesey owner. With Molesey unable to pay Torres any wages, manager Steve Beeks arranged a trial for Torres and Levis at Basingstoke Town, who they signed for in February 2004 after two months at Molesey. While at Basingstoke, Torres worked at Boots, stacking shelves to earn a living and cycled to work. He and Levis lived with a supporter of the club for four months, shortly after he was married. He scored 4 goals in 20 league appearances for Basingstoke in the 2003–04 season, while he scored twice in 38 games across the 2004–05 season.

=== Wycombe Wanderers ===
In July 2005, Basingstoke Town played in a 7–2 pre-season friendly defeat against Wycombe Wanderers, during which Torres impressed then Wycombe manager John Gorman, who stated that he thought that he could be "worth a look in training". He was offered a two-year professional contract the following month. He made his debut for Wycombe as a 58th-minute substitute in a 0–0 League Two draw with Cheltenham Town on 29 August 2005. He received the man-of-the-match award on his first start for the club in a 1–0 home victory over Barnet on 17 September 2005, before scoring his first goal for the club on 14 January 2006 with the second of a 2–0 home victory over Notts County. He suffered an ankle injury in February 2006 that ruled him out for the rest of the season, despite the initial belief that he would be ruled out for just two weeks. He scored once in 29 appearances for Wycombe across the 2005–06 season. Without Torres in the side, Wycombe qualified for the League Two play-offs but were eliminated in the semi-finals to Cheltenham Town following a 2–1 aggregate defeat.

In September 2006, Torres signed a one-year extension to his contract at Wycombe, keeping him at the club until summer 2008. He suffered a knee injury in September 2006, which limited his involvement in the first team that season. He returned to first-team action on 6 January 2007 as a substitute in a 1–1 league draw at home to Rochdale. He made 23 appearances across the 2006–07 season.

Torres scored 5 goals in 46 appearances across the 2007–08 season as the club finished second in League Two and qualified for the League Two play-offs, though the club were eliminated in the play-off semi-final after a 2–1 aggregate defeat to Stockport County.

=== Peterborough United ===
In July 2008, Torres and Wycombe team-mate Russell Martin joined League One side Peterborough United for a joint fee of £200,000, with Torres valued at £150,000. He made his debut for the club on 9 August 2008 as a substitute in a 1–0 League One defeat away to Southend United. He scored his first goal for the club on 3 March 2009 with the second Peterborough goal of a 3–2 away win at Leyton Orient. The club were promoted to the Championship at the end of the season following a second-placed finish in League One, with Torres having scored once in 18 appearances.

On 17 September 2009, he joined Lincoln City on a one-month loan. He scored his first goal for Lincoln on 3 October 2009 with the only goal of a 1–0 home win over Aldershot. He returned to Peterborough the following month after the expiry of his loan deal. He returned to Lincoln on 28 October 2009 on a loan until the end of the season. He suffered an ankle injury in November 2009 which ruled him out for 6 weeks. He returned to Peterborough prior to the end of the season and made 9 appearances without scoring, while he scored twice in 9 matches across his two spells on loan at Lincoln. He was transfer listed again by Peterborough at the end of the 2009–10 season.

Torres stated that his time at Peterborough "did not work out the way I wanted", and that he considered returning to Argentina and consulted a sports psychologist after not being selected or being played out of position. He was transfer listed by the club at the end of the season following their promotion.

=== Crawley Town ===
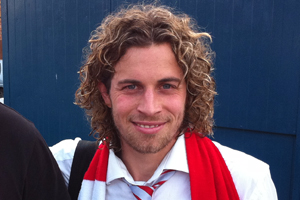
Torres in April 2011

In July 2010, Torres joined Crawley Town on a two-year contract for an undisclosed fee reported to be around £100,000 by BBC Sport, a then record fee for the club. In the 2010–11 season, Crawley were promoted to League Two, the fourth tier of English football, for the first time in their history after winning the Conference Premier with a record 105 points. The club also reached the fifth round of the FA Cup where they lost 1–0 to Premier League club Manchester United, though Torres did score the winning goal in their 2–1 third round victory over Championship side Derby County. Torres made 45 appearances for Crawley across the 2010–11 season and scored 6 goals.

Crawley achieved their second consecutive promotion to League One at the end of the 2011–12 season after finishing third in League Two. He scored 4 goals in 46 appearances for the club across the 2011–12 season. At the end of the season, Crawley took up an option to extend Torres' contract.

Torres made 28 appearances for Crawley across the 2012–13 without scoring.

At the end of the 2013–14, Torres was released by the club following a season in which he made 24 appearances without scoring.

=== Whitehawk ===
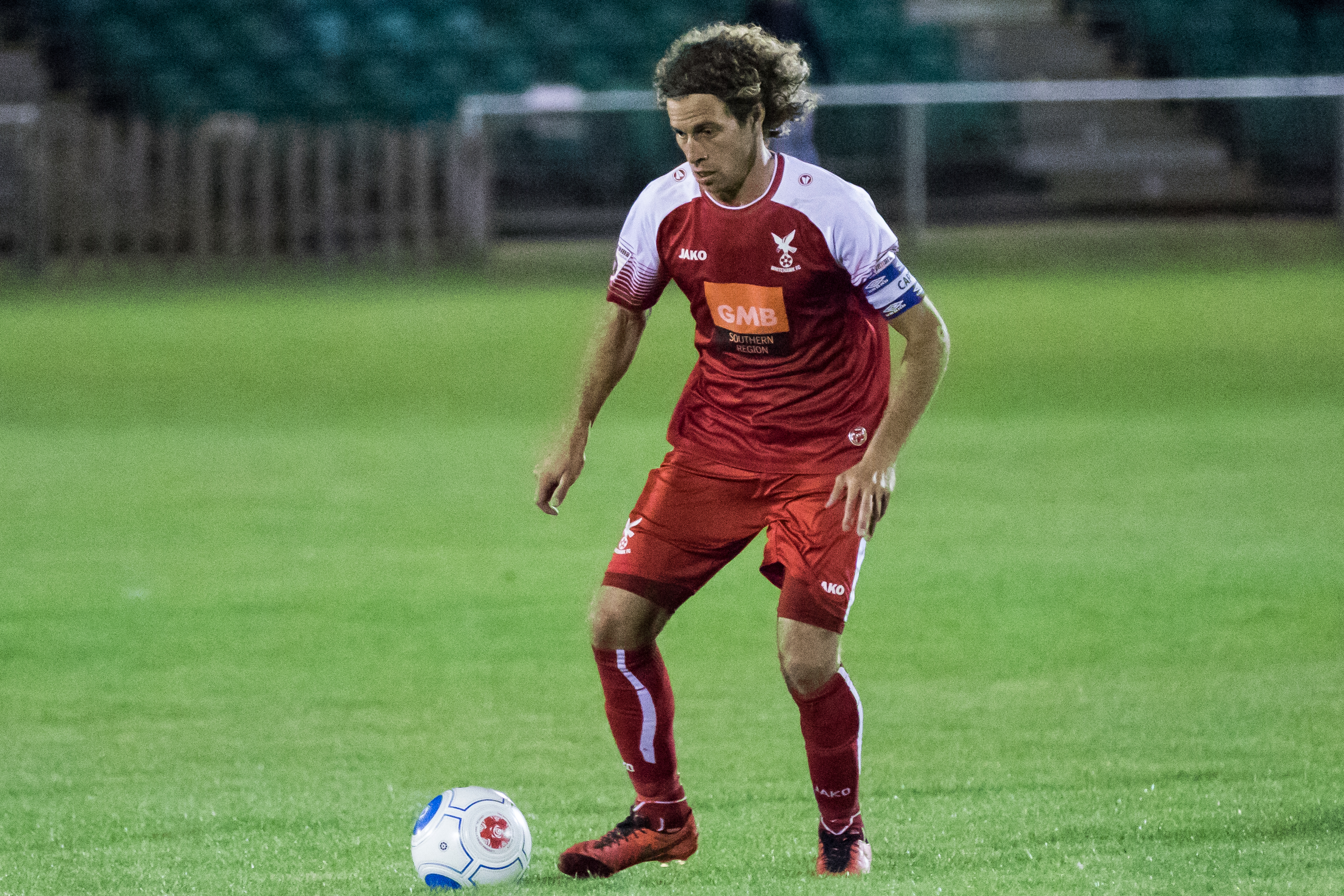
Torres playing for Whitehawk against Dartford in 2016

In June 2014 Torres signed for Conference South side Whitehawk, citing his desire to remain living in Brighton and the lack of offers from Football League teams as the reasons for dropping down three divisions. The club's owners also offered him an office job with KSD Group. While at Whitehawk, the club reached the second round of the FA Cup for the first time in their history in 2015.

Torres was appointed club captain at Whitehawk for the 2015–2016 season. After helping the club reach the league play-offs for two consecutive seasons, Torres was named in the National League South team of the season in 2016, alongside teammates Danny Mills and Nick Arnold.

=== Eastbourne Borough ===
On 7 June 2017, Torres joined fellow National League South side Eastbourne Borough. Torres left Eastbourne on 14 August 2021, after he decided to relocated to Spain with his family.

== Personal life ==
Torres lives in Brighton with his wife Lena and his two daughters, Luna and Nala. His wife is Russian, though he first met her while she was working in a hotel in Germany where Wycombe Wanderers were playing on a pre-season tour, before she moved to England to study for a master's degree. He is of Italian descent through his grandmother, and holds an Italian passport.

Torres is a supporter of Boca Juniors, having trialled with the club aged 15. In 2013, he published his autobiography with co-author Juan Manuel Lopez, titled: The Sergio Torres Story: From The Brick Factory to Old Trafford. A biographical film of his career titled The Unknown Torres was subsequently produced by filmmaker Jasper Spanjaart.

Torres is a close friend of former Southampton manager and former Scotland international defender Russell Martin, whom he played alongside at Wycombe Wanderers and Peterborough United. Torres coaches at the Russell Martin Academy in Brighton, run by Martin.

== Career statistics ==
As of match played 6 August 2019

Appearances and goals by club, season and competition
Club	Season	League			FA Cup		League Cup		Other		Total	
Club	Season	Division	Apps	Goals	Apps	Goals	Apps	Goals	Apps	Goals	Apps	Goals
Basingstoke Town	2003–04	Isthmian League; Premier Division	20	4			—				20	4
Basingstoke Town	2004–05	Conference South	38	2			—				38	2
Basingstoke Town	2004–05	Conference South	3	2	0	0	—		0	0	3	2
Basingstoke Town	Total 61!!8!!!!!!0!!0!!!!!!61!!8											
Wycombe Wanderers	2005–06	League Two	24	1	1	0	1	0	3 (Note: Appearances in Football League Trophy)	0	29	1
Wycombe Wanderers	2006–07	League Two	20	0	0	0	3	0	0	0	23	0
Wycombe Wanderers	2007–08	League Two	44	5	1	0	1	0	0	0	46	5
Wycombe Wanderers	Total		88	6	2	0	5	0	3	0	98	6
Peterborough United	2008–09	League One	15	1	2	0	1	0	0	0	18	1
Peterborough United	2009–10	Championship	9	0	0	0	0	0	—		9	0
Peterborough United	Total		24	1	2	0	1	0	0	0	27	1
Lincoln City (loan)	2009–10	League Two	8	1	1	1	0	0	0	0	9	2
Crawley Town	2010–11	Conference Premier	39	4	7	2	—		2 (Note: Appearance(s) in FA Trophy)	0	48	6
Crawley Town	2011–12	League Two	38	3	5	0	2	1	1	0	46	4
Crawley Town	2012–13	League One	23	0	2	0	2	0	1	0	28	0
Crawley Town	2013–14	League One	22	0	1	0	0	0	1	0	24	0
Crawley Town	Total		122	7	15	2	4	1	5	0	146	10
Whitehawk	2014–15	Conference South	34	1	0	0	—		3 (Note: Appearance(s) in Conference South play-offs)	0	37	1
Whitehawk	2015–16	National League South	35	2	4	0	—		2 (Note: Appearance(s) in National League South play-offs)	0	41	2
Whitehawk	2016–17	National League South	32	1	2	0	—		2	0	36	1
Whitehawk	Total		101	4	6	0	0	0	7	0	114	4
Eastbourne Borough	2017–18	National League South	42	4	2	1	—		4 (Note: Two appearances in FA Trophy, two in Sussex Senior Cup)	0	48	5
Eastbourne Borough	2018–19	National League South	31	1	3	0	—		5 (Note: Three appearances in FA Trophy, two in Sussex Senior Cup)	0	39	1
Eastbourne Borough	2019–20	National League South	13	0	2	0	—		0	0	13	0
Eastbourne Borough	Total		86	5	7	1	0	0	9	0	100	6
Career total			490	32	33	4	10	1	24	0	557	37

== Honours ==
Peterborough United

- Football League One runners-up: 2008–09

Crawley Town

- Conference National: 2010–11
- Football League Two third-place promotion: 2011–12
