= Josh Simpson (English footballer) =

English footballer (born 1987)

Personal information
- Full name: Joshua Richard Simpson
- Date of birth: 6 March 1987 (age 39)
- Place of birth: Harlow, England
- Height: 5 ft 10 in (1.78 m)
- Position: Midfielder

Senior career*
Years	Team	Apps	(Gls)
2004–2006	Cambridge City	50	(4)
2006–2007	Cambridge United	19	(0)
2007–2008	Cambridge City	46	(6)
2008–2010	Histon	49	(12)
2009–2010	→ Peterborough United (loan)	3	(2)
2010–2011	Peterborough United	18	(0)
2010	→ Southend United (loan)	17	(1)
2011–2015	Crawley Town	148	(12)
2015–2016	Plymouth Argyle	24	(1)
2017–2018	Bishop's Stortford	11	(0)
2018–2019	Cambridge City		

International career
2008–2011	England C	4	(1)
- * Club domestic league appearances and goals

Joshua Richard Simpson (born 6 March 1987) is an English former professional footballer who played as a midfielder. He has previously played for Crawley Town, Cambridge City, Plymouth Argyle, Cambridge United, Histon, Peterborough United and Southend United.

== Club career ==
Born in Harlow, Essex, Simpson started his career at Cambridge City in 2004. In 2006, he transferred to Cambridge United on a one-year contract, although Simpson ended-up back at "City" after just one season at The Abbey. He left Cambridge City in 2008, for the second time, and signed for neighbouring Histon.

He joined Championship team Peterborough United on loan until 31 December 2009, with a view to a permanent move, on 5 November 2009. He made his debut on 21 November as an 87th minute substitute in a 1–0 defeat against Sheffield United at Bramall Lane. He scored two goals for Peterborough in a 4–4 draw with Cardiff City, including the equalising goal on 90 minutes, after the team had been 4–0 down at half time. He signed for Peterborough permanently on a three-and-a-half-year contract for an undisclosed fee on 5 January 2010.

He revealed in May that he was under new management, Gary Johnson's plans for the forthcoming 2010–11 season, although Johnson stated in July that Simpson was not part of his plans. Following a successful pre season trial Simpson joined League Two team Southend United on an initial six-month loan on 5 August 2010.

He was recalled from his loan in late December and on 31 December joined Crawley Town for an undisclosed fee on a two-and-a-half-year contract. He made his debut for the club the next day as an 83rd-minute substitute against Eastbourne Borough.

On 6 July 2015, Josh signed for Football League Two club Plymouth Argyle on a one-year contract. Simpson was released by Argyle at the end of the season.

In November 2017, Simpson signed for Southern League club Bishop's Stortford.

In November 2019, Simpson returned to his former club Cambridge City, debuting against Kempston Rovers.

== International career ==
Simpson was capped four times by England C, scoring one goal, from 2008 to 2011.

== Career statistics ==
As of match played 30 May 2016

Appearances and goals by club, season and competition
Club	Season	League			FA Cup		League Cup		Other		Total	
Club	Season	Division	Apps	Goals	Apps	Goals	Apps	Goals	Apps	Goals	Apps	Goals
Cambridge City	2004–05	Conference South	18	1	1	0	—		8 (Note: One appearance in Conference Cup, two appearances in Cambridgeshire Invitation Cup, four appearances and two goals in FA Trophy, one appearance in Conference South play-offs)	2	27	3
Cambridge City	2005–06	Conference South	32	3	5	2	—		4 (Note: Appearances in FA Trophy)	1	41	6
Cambridge City	Total		50	4	6	2	—		12	3	68	9
Cambridge United	2006–07	Conference National	19	0	1	0	—		0	0	20	0
Cambridge City	2007–08	Conference South	41	6	2	1	—		6 (Note: One appearance in Conference League Cup, three appearances in FA Trophy, two appearances and one goal in Cambridgeshire Invitation Cup)	1	49	8
Cambridge City	2008–09	Southern League Premier Division	5	0	0	0	—		0	0	5	0
Cambridge City	Total		46	6	2	1	—		6	1	54	8
Histon	2008–09	Conference Premier	32	5	5	4	—		2 (Note: One appearance in FA Trophy, one in Conference Premier play-offs)	0	39	9
Histon	2009–10	Conference Premier	17	7	1	0	—		0	0	18	7
Histon	Total		49	12	6	4	—		2	0	57	16
Peterborough United (loan)	2009–10	Championship	3	2	0	0	0	0	—		3	2
Peterborough United	2009–10	Championship	18	0	0	0	0	0	—		18	0
Peterborough United	Total		21	2	0	0	0	0	—		21	2
Southend United (loan)	2010–11	League Two	17	1	2	1	2	0	3 (Note: Appearance(s) in Football League Trophy)	0	24	2
Crawley Town	2010–11	Conference Premier	26	3	0	0	—		0	0	26	3
Crawley Town	2011–12	League Two	40	2	5	0	2	0	0	0	47	2
Crawley Town	2012–13	League One	36	4	3	1	2	1	1	0	42	6
Crawley Town	2013–14	League One	38	2	1	0	1	0	1	0	41	2
Crawley Town	2014–15	League One	8	1	1	0	0	0	0	0	9	1
Crawley Town	Total		148	12	10	1	5	1	2	0	165	14
Plymouth Argyle	2015–16	League Two	24	1	1	0	1	0	2	0	28	1
Career total			374	38	28	9	8	1	27	4	437	52
