= Dannie Bulman =

English footballer (born 1979)

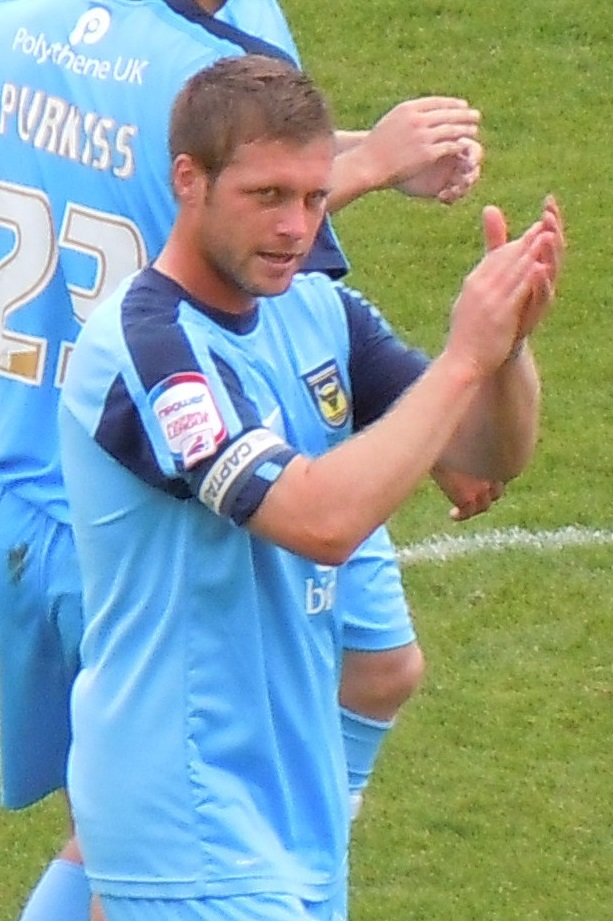
- Bulman playing for Oxford United in 2010

Personal information
- Full name: Dannie Mark Bulman
- Date of birth: 24 January 1979 (age 47)
- Place of birth: Ashford, England
- Height: 5 ft 10 in (1.78 m)
- Position: Midfielder

Youth career
- –1997: Ashford Town

Senior career*
Years	Team	Apps	(Gls)
1994–1998	Ashford Town		
1998–2004	Wycombe Wanderers	202	(14)
2004–2006	Stevenage Borough	80	(3)
2006	→ Crawley Town (loan)	37	(4)
2007–2009	Crawley Town	89	(5)
2009–2011	Oxford United	47	(0)
2010–2011	→ Crawley Town (loan)	9	(1)
2011–2014	Crawley Town	138	(4)
2014–2017	AFC Wimbledon	121	(4)
2017–2022	Crawley Town	108	(3)
Total		831	(38)
- * Club domestic league appearances and goals

Dannie Mark Bulman (born 24 January 1979) is an English former professional footballer who played as a midfielder. He played in the English Football League with Wycombe Wanderers, Oxford United, Crawley Town and AFC Wimbledon. Prior to retiring, Bulman was the oldest active player in the English Football League; he is the current host of a daytime show entitled Talk Of The Town, filmed and produced by Charlie Palethorpe. He is also one of the few footballers to have made over 1,000 competitive appearances.

Bulman started his senior career at Ashford Town, before joining Second Division side Wycombe Wanderers in 1998, where he would remain for six years before being released in 2004. Following his release by Wycombe Wanderers, Bulman joined Stevenage Borough, where he would remain for two full seasons before joining Crawley Town on loan in September 2006 and later on a permanent deal in January 2007.

After two-and-a-half seasons at Crawley, he joined Oxford United in the summer of 2009, and was promoted to League Two in his first season at the club following victory in the Conference Premier play-off final against York City. Bulman returned to Crawley on loan in September 2010, before signing on a permanent basis in January 2011, as Crawley would get promoted to the Football League for the first time in their history that season. He joined AFC Wimbledon in 2014, helping the club win promotion to League One via the play-offs in 2016, before returning to Crawley Town in 2017.

== Career ==
=== Early career ===
Bulman was born in Ashford in Surrey. He made his senior debut for Ashford Town in the 1994–95 season, at the age of 15, before spending a further four years at the club. He then made another appearance in the 1995–96 season, scored 7 goals in at least 6 matches for the 1996–97 season, and then 9 goals in at least 8 matches for the 1997–98 season. In total, he played at least 16 official matches for Ashford Town, scoring 16 goals.

=== Wycombe Wanderers ===
Having had a trial period with the club in February 1998, Bulman joined Wycombe Wanderers in the summer of 1998 for a fee of £10,000. Bulman made his debut as a late substitute in a 1–1 draw at home to Bristol Rovers on 31 August 1998, and within 15 seconds of coming on the pitch, he scored as Lee Jones' clearance had deflected off his buttocks and into the net. Bulman went on to make a further 10 appearances for the club across the 1998–99 season. Bulman spent six years at the club and played in an FA Cup semi-final against Liverpool in 2001.

=== Stevenage Borough and Crawley Town ===
He transferred to non-league Stevenage Borough in 2004 after his contract at Wycombe Wanderers expired. Bulman's competitive debut for Stevenage came on 14 August 2004, playing the entirety of a 3–1 defeat away to Dagenham & Redbridge on 14 August 2004.

He joined Crawley on a three-month loan in September 2006, with a recall clause after 30 days. His debut for the club came as a substitute on 2 September 2006 in a 2–0 defeat at home to Northwich Victoria. After making 15 league appearances on loan at Crawley, scoring thrice, he left Stevenage after his contract was cancelled by mutual consent in early December 2007. Bulman joined Crawley Town on a permanent basis in January 2007.

=== Oxford United and return to Crawley Town ===
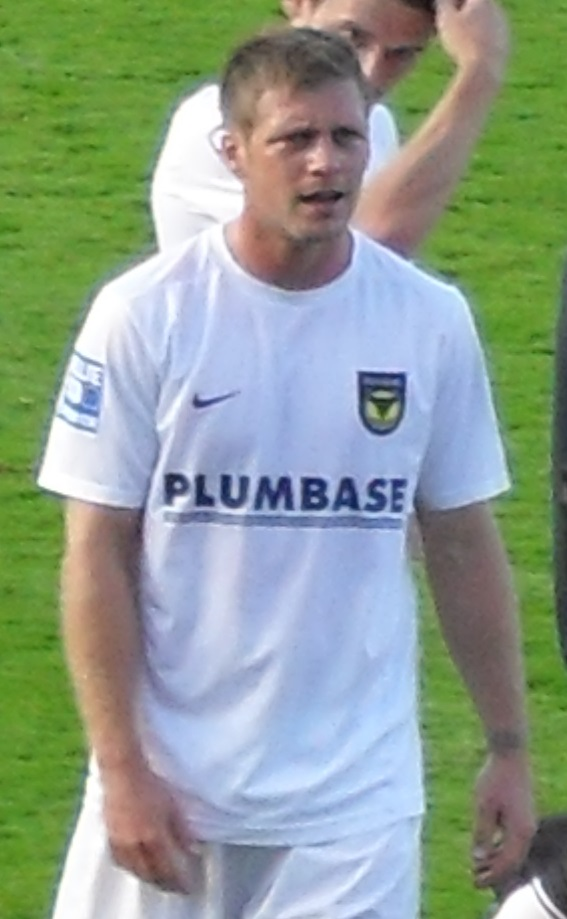
Bulman with Oxford United in October 2009

He signed for Oxford United in May 2009 on a two-year contract. He made his competitive debut for the club on 8 August 2009 in a 2–1 home victory against York City on 8 August 2009. Bulman made 42 appearances across the regular season with Oxford United, winning the Players' Player of the Year award, as they finished third and qualified for the Conference play-offs. Bulman appeared in both legs of the play-off semi-final as they defeated Rushden & Diamonds 3–1 on aggregate, prior to Bulman starting in Oxford's 3–1 victory over York City in the final, resulting in promotion to League Two.

After eight appearances for Oxford in all competitions during the 2010–11 season, he returned to Crawley Town on a three-month-long loan in September 2010. In response to his return to the club, manager Steve Evans said that he was 'delighted he wanted to come back here'. In January 2011, he agreed to sign permanently for Crawley on a free transfer, with the contract lasting until summer 2012. Bulman's first appearance of this spell with Crawley came on 1 January 2011 in a 3–1 victory at home to Eastbourne Borough. He won promotion to the Football League with Crawley after they won the Conference in the 2010–11 season, whilst they also reached the fifth round of the FA Cup, before being knocked out by Manchester United. He made 37 appearances in all competitions for Crawlry across both spells at the club during the 2010–11 season.

The 2011–12 season saw Crawley promoted again, this time to League One as they finished 3rd in League Two. Bulman appeared in 48 matches across all competitions and scored three goals.

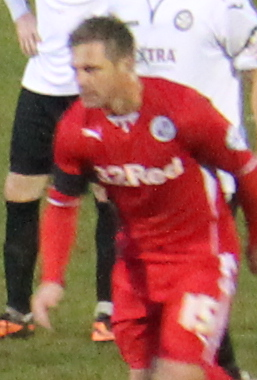
Bulman with Crawley Town in November 2013

=== AFC Wimbledon ===
In June 2014, Bulman signed for AFC Wimbledon on a free transfer. He made his debut for the club in their first match of the season, starting in a 2–2 draw at home to Shrewsbury Town on 9 August 2014.

He played for Wimbledon in the 2016 Football League Two play-off final as they won 2–0 and were promoted to League One for the first time in their history. He agreed a new deal with the club in May 2016.

Despite winning the club's Players' Player of the Year award, he was released by Wimbledon at the end of the 2016–17 season.

Bulman was selected as part of AFC Wimbledon's team of the decade for the 2010s.

=== Second return to Crawley Town ===
He returned to Crawley in 2017, and was offered a new contract at the end of the 2017–18 season. In June 2019, at the age of 40, Bulman was offered another one-year contract by Crawley; at that point he was the oldest active player in the English Football League, ahead of Kevin Ellison, Aaron Wilbraham and James Coppinger. At the end of the 2019–20 season, he was offered a new contract by the club, which he agreed to, signing a one-year contract extension as part of a player-coach arrangement. On 2 April 2022, Bulman announced his retirement from professional football at the age of 43.

== Style of play ==
Bulman generally plays as a central midfielder, but can also play as a defensive midfielder. Bulman was also known for his determination as a player. In January 2019, then manager of Crawley Town Gabriele Cioffi praised Bulman's fitness despite his age, stating that 'his performances are always competitive' and that 'he's an all-in player'.

== Career statistics ==
As of match played 2 January 2021

Appearances and goals by club, season and competition
Club	Season	League			FA Cup		League Cup		Other		Total	
Club	Season	Division	Apps	Goals	Apps	Goals	Apps	Goals	Apps	Goals	Apps	Goals
Wycombe Wanderers	1998–99	Second Division	11	1	2	0	2	0	0	0	15	1
Wycombe Wanderers	1999–2000	Second Division	29	1	2	0	0	0	1 (Note: Appearances in the Football League Trophy)	0	32	1
Wycombe Wanderers	2000–01	Second Division	36	4	9	0	4	0	3	0	52	4
Wycombe Wanderers	2001–02	Second Division	46	5	4	1	1	0	2	0	53	6
Wycombe Wanderers	2002–03	Second Division	42	3	1	0	2	0	3	1	48	4
Wycombe Wanderers	2003–04	Second Division	38	0	2	0	1	0	2	0	43	0
Wycombe Wanderers	Total		202	14	20	1	10	0	11	1	243	16
Stevenage Borough	2004–05	Conference National	40	2	2	0	—		3 (Note: Appearance(s) in the Conference Premier play-offs)	0	45	2
Stevenage Borough	2005–06	Conference National	39	1	4	0	—		1	0	44	1
Stevenage Borough	2006–07	Conference National	1	0	0	0	—		0	0	1	0
Stevenage Borough	Total		80	3	6	0	—		4	0	90	3
Crawley Town (loan)	2006–07	Conference National	15	3	0	0	—		0	0	15	3
Crawley Town	2006–07	Conference National	22	1	0	0	—		0	0	22	1
Crawley Town	2007–08	Conference Premier	44	2	0	0	—		3 (Note: 1 appearance in the Conference League Cup, 2 appearances and 2 goals in the FA Trophy)	2	47	4
Crawley Town	2008–09	Conference Premier	45	3	0	0	—		0	0	45	3
Crawley Town	Total		111	6	0	0	—		3	2	114	8
Oxford United	2009–10	Conference Premier	42	0	3	0	—		4 (Note: 3 appearances in the Conference Premier play-offs and 1 appearance in the FA Trophy)	0	49	0
Oxford United	2010–11	League Two	5	0	0	0	2	0	1	0	8	0
Oxford United	Total		47	0	3	0	2	0	5	0	57	0
Crawley Town (loan)	2010–11	Conference Premier	9	1	3	0	—		0	0	12	1
Crawley Town	2010–11	Conference Premier	22	0	3	0	—		0	0	25	0
Crawley Town	2011–12	League Two	41	3	5	0	1	0	1	0	48	3
Crawley Town	2012–13	League One	36	1	2	0	3	0	2	0	43	1
Crawley Town	2013–14	League One	39	0	2	0	1	0	1	0	43	0
Crawley Town	Total		138	4	12	0	5	0	4	0	159	4
AFC Wimbledon	2014–15	League Two	41	1	4	0	1	0	3	0	49	1
AFC Wimbledon	2015–16	League Two	42	3	1	0	1	0	3 (Note: Appearances in the League Two play-offs)	0	47	3
AFC Wimbledon	2016–17	League One	38	0	4	0	0	0	2 (Note: Appearances in the EFL Trophy)	0	44	0
AFC Wimbledon	Total		121	4	9	0	2	0	8	0	140	4
Crawley Town	2017–18	League Two	37	0	1	0	0	0	2	0	40	0
Crawley Town	2018–19	League Two	36	3	0	0	1	0	3	0	40	3
Crawley Town	2019–20	League Two	29	0	2	0	3	1	3	0	37	1
Crawley Town	2020–21	League Two	6	0	2	0	1	0	0	0	9	0
Crawley Town	2021–22	League Two	—		—		—		—		0	0
Crawley Town	Total		108	3	5	0	5	1	8	0	126	4
Career total			831	38	58	1	24	1	43	3	956	43

== Honours ==
Oxford United

- Conference Premier play-offs: 2010

Crawley Town

- Conference Premier: 2010–11

AFC Wimbledon

- Football League Two play-offs: 2016

== See also ==
- List of men's footballers with 1,000 or more official appearances
