= Kyle McFadzean =

English footballer (born 1987)

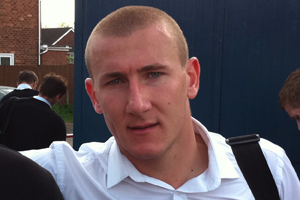
- McFadzean in 2011

Personal information
- Full name: Kyle John McFadzean
- Date of birth: 20 February 1987 (age 39)
- Place of birth: Sheffield, England
- Height: 6 ft 1 in (1.85 m)
- Position: Centre back

Team information
- Current team: Chesterfield
- Number: 5

Youth career
- –2005: Sheffield United

Senior career*
Years	Team	Apps	(Gls)
2005–2007	Sheffield United	0	(0)
2007–2010	Alfreton Town	85	(3)
2010–2014	Crawley Town	133	(9)
2014–2016	Milton Keynes Dons	80	(3)
2016–2019	Burton Albion	108	(5)
2019–2024	Coventry City	155	(8)
2024–2025	Blackburn Rovers	13	(0)
2025–	Chesterfield	33	(2)

International career^{‡}
2009–2010	England C	4	(1)
- * Club domestic league appearances and goals as of 07:26, 15 February 2026 (UTC) ‡ National team caps and goals as of 20:21, 21 December 2020 (UTC)

Kyle John McFadzean (born 20 February 1987) is an English professional footballer who plays as a centre back for EFL League Two club Chesterfield.

== Club career ==
=== Sheffield United ===
Born in Sheffield, South Yorkshire, McFadzean was a member of Sheffield United's academy before being given a squad number for the 2005–06 season despite playing the majority of the campaign in the reserves. He made his first-team debut as a substitute in place of Keith Gillespie in a League Cup tie against Shrewsbury Town on 20 September 2005.

=== Alfreton Town ===
He signed for Conference North club Alfreton Town on a free transfer in July 2007.

=== Crawley Town ===
On 20 August 2010, McFadzean signed for Conference Premier club Crawley Town for an undisclosed fee, making his debut as a substitute in Crawley's 1–0 away win at Altrincham. He was named in the Conference Premier Team of the Year for the 2010–11 season after Crawley won the title and so promotion to League Two.

=== Milton Keynes Dons ===
On 20 June 2014, McFadzean signed for Milton Keynes Dons from Crawley Town for an undisclosed fee, on a two-year deal with an option of a third year. He scored in his league debut against Gillingham capitalising off fellow new signing Danny Green's cross. The match ended a 4–2 victory to the Dons. On top of that, in his cup debut he scored with a back-heel in what ended up being a 3–1 win over fierce rivals AFC Wimbledon he was awarded the man-of-the-match award.

Although he had signed a two-year contract extension seven months earlier to keep him at the club until June 2018, McFadzean made a transfer request at the end of the 2015–16 season following the club's relegation back to League One and failed to attend pre-season training with MK Dons.

=== Burton Albion ===
On 12 July 2016, McFadzean signed a three-year contract for newly promoted Championship club Burton Albion for a club record undisclosed fee. He scored his first goal for Burton in a 3–1 win over Sheffield Wednesday on 16 August 2016.

=== Coventry City ===
McFadzean signed for then League One club Coventry City on 9 May 2019 on a two-year contract. He scored his first goal for Coventry in a 3–2 win against Queens Park Rangers on 18 September 2020.

On 13 February 2023, McFadzean signed a new contract keeping him at the club until 2024.

=== Blackburn Rovers ===
On 31 January 2024, McFadzean joined Championship club Blackburn Rovers on a short-term contract until the end of the season having had his Coventry contract terminated by mutual consent.

=== Chesterfield ===
On 22 January 2025, McFadzean joined League Two side Chesterfield on a short-term contract until the end of the season. In just his third appearance for the club, he suffered a serious knee injury that would rule him out for a "significant period of time". After originally joining on a short-term contract in January, McFadzean signed a contract extension ahead of the 2025–26 season. On 16 August 2025, McFazdean scored his first goal for Chesterfield, in a 3-1 League Two home victory against Bristol Rovers. He extended his contract a further year in July 2026.

== International career ==
McFadzean gained England C recognition in September 2009, as he was called into the team that played against Hungary U23s, and then retained his place in the squad for a 2–1 victory in November over Poland U23s.

== Personal life ==
Born in England, McFadzean is of Scottish descent. His younger brother Callum McFadzean is also a footballer.

== Career statistics ==
As of match played on 13 February 2024

Appearances and goals by club, season and competition
Club	Season	League			FA Cup		League Cup		Other		Total	
Club	Season	Division	Apps	Goals	Apps	Goals	Apps	Goals	Apps	Goals	Apps	Goals
Sheffield United	2005–06	Championship	0	0	0	0	1	0	—		1	0
Sheffield United	2006–07	Premier League	0	0	0	0	0	0	—		0	0
Sheffield United	Total		0	0	0	0	1	0	—		1	0
Alfreton Town	2007–08	Conference North	22	1	0	0	—		4 (Note: One appearance in Conference League Cup, three in FA Trophy)	0	26	1
Alfreton Town	2008–09	Conference North	29	2	1	0	—		4 (Note: Two appearances FA Trophy, two in Conference North play-offs)	0	34	2
Alfreton Town	2009–10	Conference North	32	0	3	0	—		3 (Note: Appearances in Conference North play-offs)	0	38	0
Alfreton Town	2010–11	Conference North	2	0	—		—		—		2	0
Alfreton Town	Total		85	3	4	0	—		11	0	100	3
Crawley Town	2010–11	Conference Premier	37	3	6	0	—		1 (Note: Appearance in FA Trophy)	0	44	3
Crawley Town	2011–12	League Two	37	2	5	1	2	0	1 (Note: Appearance in Football League Trophy)	0	45	3
Crawley Town	2012–13	League One	17	3	1	0	2	0	1	0	21	3
Crawley Town	2013–14	League One	42	1	3	0	1	0	0	0	46	1
Crawley Town	Total		133	9	15	1	5	0	3	0	156	10
Milton Keynes Dons	2014–15	League One	41	3	3	0	4	1	1	0	49	4
Milton Keynes Dons	2015–16	Championship	39	0	2	0	3	0	—		44	0
Milton Keynes Dons	Total		80	3	5	0	7	1	1	0	93	4
Burton Albion	2016–17	Championship	31	1	1	0	2	0	—		34	1
Burton Albion	2017–18	Championship	42	0	1	0	2	0	—		45	0
Burton Albion	2018–19	League One	35	4	1	0	4	0	2 (Note: Appearances in EFL Trophy)	0	42	4
Burton Albion	Total		108	5	3	0	8	0	2	0	121	5
Coventry City	2019–20	League One	30	0	7	0	0	0	3	0	40	0
Coventry City	2020–21	Championship	38	2	1	0	1	0	—		40	2
Coventry City	2021–22	Championship	37	3	0	0	0	0	—		37	3
Coventry City	2022–23	Championship	35	2	0	0	1	0	3 (Note: Appearances in 2023 English Football League play-offs)	0	38	2
Coventry City	2023–24	Championship	15	1	0	0	0	0	0	0	15	1
Coventry City	Total		155	8	8	0	2	0	6	0	171	8
Blackburn Rovers	2023–24	Championship	2	0	0	0	0	0	0	0	2	0
Career total			563	28	35	1	23	1	23	0	644	30

== Honours ==
Crawley Town

- Football League Two third-place promotion: 2011–12
- Conference Premier: 2010–11

Milton Keynes Dons

- Football League One second-place promotion: 2014–15

Coventry City

- EFL League One: 2019–20

Individual

- Conference Premier Team of the Year: 2010–11
- PFA Team of the Year: 2011–12 League Two
