= 2014–15 Football League Two =

Football League Two
- Season: 2014–15
- Champions: Burton Albion (1st divisional title)
- Promoted: Burton Albion; Shrewsbury Town; Bury; Southend United
- Relegated: Cheltenham Town; Tranmere Rovers
- Matches: 552
- Goals: 1,317 (2.39 per match)
- Top goalscorer: Matt Tubbs (21 goals)
- Biggest home win: Cambridge United 5–0 Carlisle United (30 August 2014); Shrewsbury Town 5–0 Bury (21 October 2014)
- Biggest away win: Accrington Stanley 1–5 Northampton Town (31 January 2015); Cambridge United 2–6 Portsmouth (21 February 2015)
- Highest scoring: Northampton Town 4–5 Accrington Stanley (20 September 2014)
- Longest winning run: 7 games Luton Town; Southend United
- Longest unbeaten run: 13 games Burton Albion
- Longest winless run: 13 games Tranmere Rovers
- Longest losing run: 7 games Luton Town
- Highest attendance: 17,558; Portsmouth 0–2 AFC Wimbledon (26 December 2014)
- Lowest attendance: 919; Accrington Stanley 1–0 Burton Albion (24 February 2015)
- Total attendance: 2,576,942
- Average attendance: 4,676
- All statistics correct as of 2 May 2015.

The 2014–15 Football League Two (referred to as the Sky Bet League Two for sponsorship reasons) was the 11th season of the Football League Two under its current title and the 23rd season under its current league division format. The season began on 9 August 2014.

Twenty four clubs participated, eighteen of which remained in League Two having been neither promoted nor relegated at the end of the 2013–14 season. These clubs were joined by Tranmere Rovers, Carlisle United, Shrewsbury Town and Stevenage who were relegated from 2013–14 Football League One, and by Luton Town and Cambridge United who were both promoted from the 2013–14 Football Conference.

Burton Albion won the League Two title after a 3–2 away to Cambridge United on 2 May.

== Changes from last season ==
=== Team changes ===
The following teams changed division at the end of the 2013–14 season.

==== To League Two ====
Promoted from Conference Premier

- Luton Town
- Cambridge United

Relegated from Football League One

- Tranmere Rovers
- Carlisle United
- Shrewsbury Town
- Stevenage

==== From League Two ====
Relegated to Conference Premier

- Bristol Rovers
- Torquay United

Promoted to Football League One

- Chesterfield
- Scunthorpe United
- Rochdale
- Fleetwood Town

== Team overview ==
=== Stadia and locations ===
Locations of teams in the 2014–2015 Football League Two

Team	Location	Stadium	Capacity
Accrington Stanley	Accrington	Crown Ground	5,057
AFC Wimbledon	London (Norbiton)	Kingsmeadow	4,850
Burton Albion	Burton	Pirelli Stadium	6,912
Bury	Bury	Gigg Lane	11,840
Cambridge United	Cambridge	Abbey Stadium	8,127
Carlisle United	Carlisle	Brunton Park	16,981
Cheltenham Town	Cheltenham	Whaddon Road	7,066
Dagenham & Redbridge	London (Dagenham)	Victoria Road	6,078
Exeter City	Exeter	St James Park	8,830
Hartlepool United	Hartlepool	Victoria Park	8,240
Luton Town	Luton	Kenilworth Road	10,356
Mansfield Town	Mansfield	Field Mill	10,000
Morecambe	Morecambe	Globe Arena	6,476
Newport County	Newport	Rodney Parade	7,850 (Note: Newport County's safety certificate at the time allowed a maximum attendance of 7,850 for football matches)
Northampton Town	Northampton	Sixfields Stadium	7,653
Oxford United	Oxford	Kassam Stadium	12,500
Plymouth Argyle	Plymouth	Home Park	16,388
Portsmouth	Portsmouth	Fratton Park	20,224
Shrewsbury Town	Shrewsbury	New Meadow	9,875
Southend United	Southend-on-Sea	Roots Hall	11,840
Stevenage	Stevenage	Broadhall Way	6,722
Tranmere Rovers	Birkenhead	Prenton Park	16,789
Wycombe Wanderers	High Wycombe	Adams Park	10,284
York City	York	Bootham Crescent	7,872

=== Managerial changes ===
Team	Outgoing manager	Manner of departure	Date of vacancy	Position in table	Incoming manager	Date of appointment
Shrewsbury Town	Michael Jackson	Appointed as Assistant Manager	12 May 2014	Pre-season	Micky Mellon	12 May 2014
Oxford United	Gary Waddock	Sacked	4 July 2014	Pre-season	Michael Appleton	4 July 2014
Carlisle United	Graham Kavanagh	Sacked	1 September 2014	22nd	Keith Curle	19 September 2014
Accrington Stanley	James Beattie	Mutual consent	12 September 2014	21st	John Coleman	18 September 2014
Hartlepool United	Colin Cooper	Resigned	4 October 2014	24th	Paul Murray	23 October 2014
Tranmere Rovers	Robert Edwards	Sacked	13 October 2014	24th	Micky Adams	16 October 2014
York City	Nigel Worthington	Resigned	13 October 2014	22nd	Russ Wilcox	15 October 2014
Burton Albion	Gary Rowett	Signed by Birmingham City	27 October 2014	3rd	Jimmy Floyd Hasselbaink	13 November 2014
Mansfield Town	Paul Cox	Mutual consent	21 November 2014	19th	Adam Murray	5 December 2014
Cheltenham Town	Mark Yates	Sacked	25 November 2014	18th	Paul Buckle	26 November 2014
Hartlepool United	Paul Murray	Sacked	6 December 2014	24th	Ronnie Moore	16 December 2014
Newport County	Justin Edinburgh	Signed by Gillingham	7 February 2015	6th	Terry Butcher	30 April 2015
Cheltenham Town	Paul Buckle	Mutual consent	13 February 2015	22nd	Gary Johnson	30 March 2015
Portsmouth	Andy Awford	Mutual consent	13 April 2015	14th	Paul Cook	12 May 2015
Tranmere Rovers	Micky Adams	Mutual consent	19 April 2015	24th	Gary Brabin	5 May 2015

== League table ==
Pos	Team	Pld	W	D	L	GF	GA	GD	Pts	Promotion, qualification or relegation
1	Burton Albion (C, P)	46	28	10	8	69	39	+30	94	Promotion to Football League One
2	Shrewsbury Town (P)	46	27	8	11	67	31	+36	89	Promotion to Football League One
3	Bury (P)	46	26	7	13	60	40	+20	85	Promotion to Football League One
4	Wycombe Wanderers	46	23	15	8	67	45	+22	84	Qualification for League Two play-offs (Note: Four teams play for one spot and promotion to Football League One.)
5	Southend United (O, P)	46	24	12	10	54	38	+16	84	Qualification for League Two play-offs
6	Stevenage	46	20	12	14	62	54	+8	72	Qualification for League Two play-offs
7	Plymouth Argyle	46	20	11	15	55	37	+18	71	Qualification for League Two play-offs
8	Luton Town	46	19	11	16	54	44	+10	68	
9	Newport County	46	18	11	17	51	54	−3	65	
10	Exeter City	46	17	13	16	61	65	−4	64	
11	Morecambe	46	17	12	17	53	52	+1	63	
12	Northampton Town	46	18	7	21	67	62	+5	61	
13	Oxford United	46	15	16	15	50	49	+1	61	
14	Dagenham & Redbridge	46	17	8	21	58	59	−1	59	
15	AFC Wimbledon	46	14	16	16	54	60	−6	58	
16	Portsmouth	46	14	15	17	52	54	−2	57	
17	Accrington Stanley	46	15	11	20	58	77	−19	56	
18	York City	46	11	19	16	46	51	−5	52	
19	Cambridge United	46	13	12	21	61	66	−5	51	
20	Carlisle United	46	14	8	24	56	74	−18	50	
21	Mansfield Town	46	13	9	24	38	62	−24	48	
22	Hartlepool United	46	12	9	25	39	70	−31	45	
23	Cheltenham Town (R)	46	9	14	23	40	67	−27	41	Relegation to the National League
24	Tranmere Rovers (R)	46	9	12	25	45	67	−22	39	Relegation to the National League

Updated to match(es) played on 23 May 2015. Source: BBC Sport
Rules for classification: 1) Points; 2) Goal difference; 3) Number of goals scored
(C) Champions; (O) Play-off winners; (P) Promoted; (R) Relegated

== Play-offs ==
Semifinals
4	Wycombe Wanderers	3	2	5
7	Plymouth Argyle	2	1	3
5	Southend United	1	3	4
6	Stevenage	1	1	2

Final
4	Wycombe Wanderers	1 (6)
5	Southend United	1 (7)

== Results ==
Home \ Away	ACC	WIM	BRT	BRY	CAM	CRL	CHL	D&R	EXE	HAR	LUT	MAN	MOR	NPC	NOR	OXF	PLY	POR	SHR	STD	STE	TRA	WYC	YOR
Accrington Stanley		1–0	1–0	0–1	2–1	3–1	1–1	1–2	2–3	3–1	2–2	2–1	2–1	0–2	1–5	1–0	1–0	1–1	1–2	0–1	2–2	3–2	1–1	2–2
AFC Wimbledon	2–1		3–0	3–2	1–2	1–3	1–1	1–0	4–1	1–2	3–2	0–1	1–0	2–0	2–2	0–0	0–0	1–0	2–2	0–0	2–3	2–2	0–0	2–1
Burton Albion	3–0	0–0		1–0	1–3	1–1	1–0	2–1	1–0	4–0	1–0	2–1	0–2	0–1	3–1	2–0	1–1	2–0	1–0	2–1	1–1	2–0	1–0	2–0
Bury	2–1	2–0	3–1		2–0	2–1	0–1	0–2	1–1	1–0	1–0	2–0	1–2	1–3	2–1	0–1	2–1	3–0	1–0	0–1	2–1	2–0	1–1	2–2
Cambridge United	2–2	0–0	2–3	0–2		5–0	1–2	1–1	1–2	2–1	0–1	3–1	1–2	4–0	2–1	5–1	1–0	2–6	0–0	0–1	1–1	1–2	0–1	0–3
Carlisle United	1–0	4–4	3–4	0–3	0–1		1–0	1–0	1–3	3–3	0–1	2–1	1–1	2–3	2–1	2–1	2–0	2–2	1–2	1–1	3–0	1–0	2–3	0–3
Cheltenham Town	2–1	1–1	1–3	1–2	3–1	0–0		1–1	1–2	1–0	1–1	1–1	1–1	0–1	3–2	1–1	0–3	1–1	0–1	0–1	0–1	2–0	1–4	0–1
Dagenham & Redbridge	4–0	4–0	1–3	1–0	2–3	4–2	3–1		1–2	2–0	0–0	2–0	0–3	0–1	0–2	0–0	2–0	0–0	1–2	1–3	0–2	0–1	0–1	2–0
Exeter City	1–2	3–2	1–1	2–1	2–2	2–0	1–0	2–1		1–2	1–1	1–2	1–1	2–0	0–2	1–1	1–3	1–1	3–2	0–1	0–0	1–2	2–1	1–1
Hartlepool United	1–1	1–0	0–1	0–2	2–1	0–3	2–0	0–2	2–1		1–2	1–0	0–2	2–2	1–0	1–1	3–2	0–0	2–0	0–1	1–3	0–0	1–3	1–3
Luton Town	2–0	0–1	0–1	1–1	3–2	1–0	1–0	3–1	2–3	3–0		3–0	2–3	3–0	1–0	2–0	0–1	1–1	0–0	2–0	2–0	1–0	2–3	2–2
Mansfield Town	0–1	2–1	1–2	0–1	0–0	3–2	1–1	2–1	2–3	1–1	1–0		1–0	1–0	1–1	2–1	1–0	1–2	0–1	1–2	1–0	1–0	0–0	1–4
Morecambe	1–1	1–1	1–2	1–0	0–2	0–1	0–0	2–3	0–2	0–1	3–0	2–1		3–2	0–1	1–0	2–1	3–1	1–4	3–1	0–0	0–0	1–3	1–1
Newport County	1–1	4–1	1–1	0–2	1–1	2–1	1–1	2–3	2–2	2–2	1–0	0–1	0–1		3–2	0–1	2–0	1–0	0–1	1–0	2–0	1–1	0–2	3–1
Northampton Town	4–5	2–0	1–2	2–3	0–1	0–2	2–0	1–0	1–0	5–1	2–1	1–0	2–1	3–0		1–3	2–3	1–0	1–1	1–1	1–0	1–0	2–3	3–0
Oxford United	3–1	0–0	0–1	2–1	2–0	2–1	1–2	3–3	2–2	0–2	1–1	3–0	1–1	1–0	1–1		0–0	0–1	0–2	2–3	0–0	2–0	1–2	0–0
Plymouth Argyle	1–0	1–1	1–1	0–2	2–0	1–0	3–0	3–0	3–0	2–0	0–1	2–1	1–1	0–0	2–0	1–2		3–0	1–0	2–0	1–1	3–2	0–1	1–1
Portsmouth	2–3	0–2	1–1	0–1	2–1	3–0	2–2	3–0	1–0	1–0	2–0	1–1	3–0	0–1	2–0	0–0	2–1		0–2	1–2	3–2	3–2	1–1	1–1
Shrewsbury Town	4–0	2–0	1–0	5–0	1–1	1–0	3–1	2–0	4–0	3–0	2–0	2–0	1–0	0–0	1–2	2–0	0–2	2–1		1–1	3–2	2–1	0–0	1–0
Southend United	1–2	0–1	0–0	1–1	0–0	2–0	2–0	0–0	1–1	1–0	1–0	2–0	0–1	2–0	2–0	1–1	0–0	2–0	1–0		2–0	1–0	2–2	1–0
Stevenage	2–1	2–1	1–0	0–0	3–2	1–0	5–1	0–1	1–0	1–0	1–2	3–0	1–1	2–1	2–1	0–2	1–0	1–0	1–0	4–2		2–2	1–3	2–3
Tranmere Rovers	3–0	1–1	1–4	0–1	1–1	0–2	2–3	2–3	1–2	1–1	0–1	0–0	2–1	0–0	2–1	0–3	0–1	3–1	2–1	1–2	2–2		1–2	1–1
Wycombe Wanderers	2–2	2–0	1–3	0–0	1–0	3–1	2–1	1–1	2–1	1–0	1–1	2–1	0–1	1–2	1–1	2–3	0–2	0–0	1–0	4–1	2–2	0–2		1–0
York City	1–0	2–3	1–1	0–1	2–2	0–0	1–0	0–2	0–0	1–0	0–0	1–1	2–1	0–2	1–1	0–1	0–0	0–0	0–1	2–3	0–2	2–0	0–0	

Updated to match(es) played on 25 April 2015. Source: BBC Sport
Legend: Blue = home team win; Yellow = draw; Red = away team win.

== Top scorers ==
Rank	Player	Club	Goals
1	(England) Matt Tubbs	AFC Wimbledon/Portsmouth	21
2	(England) Jamie Cureton	Dagenham and Redbridge	19
3	(England) Reuben Reid	Plymouth Argyle	18
3	(England) Marc Richards	Northampton Town	18
5	(Republic of Ireland) James Collins	Shrewsbury Town	15
5	(England) Tom Nichols	Exeter City	15
7	(Republic of Ireland) Barry Corr	Southend United	14
7	(England) Danny Hylton	Oxford United	14
7	(England) Jed Wallace	Portsmouth	14
10	(England) Adebayo Akinfenwa	AFC Wimbledon	13
10	(England) Mark Cullen	Luton Town	13
