= 2012–13 Crawley Town F.C. season =

Crawley Town F.C.
2012–13 season
- Chairman: Victor Marley
- Manager: Sean O'Driscoll (until 19 July); Richie Barker
- League One: 10th
- FA Cup: Third round
- League Cup: Third round
- Football League Trophy: Second round (southern)
- Top goalscorer: League: Billy Clarke (8); Nicky Adams (8); All: Billy Clarke (12)
- Highest home attendance: League: 5,058 (vs. Portsmouth, 9 September); All: 5,880 (vs. Reading, 5 January)
- Lowest home attendance: League: 2,544 (vs. Crewe Alexandra, 26 March); All: 1,249 (vs. Gillingham, 4 September)
- Average home league attendance: 3,351
| Home colours | Away colours | Third colours |

The 2012–13 season was the 63rd season in which Crawley Town played senior football, and the eighth as a fully professional team. Crawley Town competed in Football League One, the third tier of English football, following consecutive automatic promotions from the 2010–11 Football Conference and the 2011–12 Football League Two during the past two seasons.

Sean O'Driscoll, who was appointed Crawley manager in May 2012, left the club just two months later to manage Nottingham Forest, despite not having taken charge of a competitive game. Richie Barker succeeded as manager on 7 August 2012, after agreeing compensation with Bury.

On 5 January 2013, in their third round FA Cup tie with Premier League side Reading, Crawley had a record attendance of 5,880 at Broadfield Stadium.

Crawley finished the season in 10th place.

== Table ==
| Pos | Team | Pld | W | D | L | GF | GA | GD | Pts |
|---|---|---|---|---|---|---|---|---|---|
| 8 | Milton Keynes Dons | 46 | 19 | 13 | 14 | 62 | 45 | +17 | 70 |
| 9 | Walsall | 46 | 17 | 17 | 12 | 65 | 58 | +7 | 68 |
| 10 | Crawley Town | 46 | 18 | 14 | 14 | 59 | 58 | +1 | 68 |
| 11 | Tranmere Rovers | 46 | 19 | 10 | 17 | 58 | 48 | +10 | 67 |
| 12 | Notts County | 46 | 16 | 17 | 13 | 61 | 49 | +12 | 65 |

Updated to match(es) played on 27 April 2013. Source: BBC Sport
Rules for classification: 1) Points; 2) Goal difference; 3) Number of goals scored

== Results ==
=== Pre-season ===
| 11 July 2012 | Tonbridge Angels | 0–4 | Crawley Town | Tonbridge |
| 19:45 BST | | Report | | Stadium: Longmead Stadium; Attendance: 323 |

| 14 July 2012 | Bromley | 2–3 | Crawley Town | Bromley |
| 15:00 BST | | Report | | Stadium: Hayes Lane |

| 17 July 2012 | Woking | 1–0 | Crawley Town | Woking |
| 19:45 BST | St Aimie 18' | Report | | Stadium: Kingfield Stadium; Attendance: 639 |

| 21 July 2012 | Crawley Town | 1–0 | Peterborough United | Crawley |
| | Alexander 14' | Report | | Stadium: Broadfield Stadium; Attendance: 1,032 |

| 25 July 2012 | Three Bridges | 1–2 | Crawley Town | Three Bridges |
| 19:45 BST | | Report | | Stadium: Jubilee Field |

| 28 July 2012 | Crawley Town | 2–0 | Millwall | Crawley |
| | Clarke 30'; Alexander 49' (pen.) | Report | | Stadium: Broadfield Stadium; Attendance: 1,679 |

| 1 August 2012 | Crawley Town | 0–1 | Charlton Athletic | Crawley |
| | | Report | | Stadium: Broadfield Stadium; Attendance: 1,411 |

| 10 August 2012 | Crawley Town | 2–2 | Brighton & Hove Albion | Crawley |
| | | Report | | Stadium: Broadfield Stadium; Attendance: 2,167 |

=== League One ===
| Round | 1 | 2 | 3 | 4 | 5 | 6 | 7 | 8 | 9 | 10 | 11 | 12 | 13 | 14 | 15 | 16 | 17 | 18 | 19 | 20 | 21 | 22 | 23 | 24 | 25 | 26 | 27 | 28 | 29 | 30 | 31 | 32 | 33 | 34 | 35 | 36 | 37 | 38 | 39 | 40 | 41 | 42 | 43 | 44 | 45 | 46 |
|---|---|---|---|---|---|---|---|---|---|---|---|---|---|---|---|---|---|---|---|---|---|---|---|---|---|---|---|---|---|---|---|---|---|---|---|---|---|---|---|---|---|---|---|---|---|---|
| Ground | H | A | A | H | H | A | A | H | A | H | A | H | A | H | H | A | A | H | H | A | H | A | H | A | A | H | A | H | A | H | A | H | A | H | H | A | A | H | H | A | A | A | H | A | H | H |
| Result | W | L | W | W | L | W | D | L | W | W | L | W | W | W | D | L | D | D | L | L | D | W | L | W | L | W | L | D | L | D | W | L | W | D | D | D | D | W | D | L | D | W | W | L | W | D |
| Position | 1 | 9 | 7 | 4 | 6 | 4 | 4 | 8 | 7 | 3 | 6 | 4 | 4 | 4 | 2 | 4 | 4 | 6 | 9 | 9 | 10 | 10 | 10 | 8 | 8 | 8 | 9 | 14 | 15 | 14 | 12 | 14 | 12 | 12 | 13 | 12 | 13 | 12 | 12 | 13 | 12 | 11 | 11 | 12 | 10 | 10 |

Updated to match(es) played on 13 June 2013. Source: Statto
A = Away; H = Home; W = Win; D = Draw; L = Loss

==== Results ====
| 18 August 2012 1 | Crawley Town | 3–0 | Scunthorpe United | Crawley |
| 15:00 | Alexander 33', 64' (pen.); Forte 80' | Report | | Stadium: Broadfield Stadium; Attendance: 3,172; Referee: Malone |

| 21 August 2012 2 | Swindon Town | 3–0 | Crawley Town | Swindon |
| 19:45 | Ritchie 25'; Miller 44'; De Vita 63' | | | Stadium: County Ground; Attendance: 7,658; Referee: Stroud |

| 25 August 2012 3 | Doncaster Rovers | 0–1 | Crawley Town | Doncaster |
| 15:00 | | Report | 87' Ajose | Stadium: Keepmoat Stadium; Attendance: 6,403; Referee: Kettle |

| 1 September 2012 4 | Crawley Town | 1–0 | Leyton Orient | Crawley |
| 15:00 BST | Ajose 72' | Report | | Stadium: Broadfield Stadium; Attendance: 4,287; Referee: Gibbs |

| 9 September 2012 5 | Crawley Town | 0–3 | Portsmouth | Crawley |
| 15:30 BST | | Report | 74' Harris; 83' Rodgers; 85' McLeod | Stadium: Broadfield Stadium; Attendance: 5,058; Referee: Deadman |

| 15 September 2012 6 | Preston North End | 1–2 | Crawley Town | Preston |
| 15:00 BST | Huntington 90+1' | Report | 54', 68' Alexander | Stadium: Deepdale; Attendance: 9,812; Referee: Webb |

| 18 September 2012 7 | Colchester United | 1–1 | Crawley Town | Colchester |
| 19:45 BST | Wordsworth 87' (pen.) | Report | McFadzean 71' | Stadium: Colchester Community Stadium; Attendance: 2,484; Referee: Woolmer |

| 22 September 2012 8 | Crawley Town | 2–5 | Tranmere Rovers | Crawley |
| 15:00 BST | Simpson 12'; McFadzean 16' | Report | Holmes 2'; Cassidy 39', 53'; Akpa Akpro 46'; Robinson 90' | Stadium: Broadfield Stadium; Attendance: 3,099; Referee: Russell |

| 29 September 2012 9 | Carlisle United | 0–2 | Crawley Town | Carlisle |
| 15:00 BST | | Report | Byrne 64'; Adams 73' | Stadium: Brunton Park; Attendance: 4,221; Referee: Heywood |

| 2 October 2012 10 | Crawley Town | 3–1 | Bournemouth | Crawley |
| 19:45 BST | Akpan 31'; Walsh 45'; Adams 62' | Report | Barnard 52' | Stadium: Broadfield Stadium; Attendance: 2,928; Referee: Davies |

| 6 October 2012 11 | Brentford | 2–1 | Crawley Town | Brentford |
| 15:00 BST | Donaldson 23', 76' | Report | Adams 59' | Stadium: Griffin Park; Attendance: 5,607; Referee: Naylor |

| 13 October 2012 12 | Crawley Town | 3–2 | Bury | Crawley |
| 15:00 BST | Adams 43', 90'; Akpan 53' | Report | Hopper 66'; Bishop 69' | Stadium: Broadfield Stadium; Attendance: 3,300; Referee: Langford |

| 20 October 2012 13 | Hartlepool United | 0–1 | Crawley Town | Hartlepool |
| 15:00 BST | | Report | Akpan 15' | Stadium: Victoria Park (Hartlepool); Attendance: 3,852; Referee: Wright |

| 23 October 2012 14 | Crawley Town | 2–0 | Milton Keynes Dons | Crawley |
| 19:45 BST | Clarke 21', 90' | Report | | Stadium: Broadfield Stadium; Attendance: 2,853; Referee: Hooper |

| 27 October 2012 15 | Crawley Town | 1–1 | Oldham Athletic | Crawley |
| 15:00 BST | McFadzean 79' | Report | Baxter 67' | Stadium: Broadfield Stadium; Attendance: 3,375; Referee: Ward |

| 6 November 2012 16 | Coventry City | 3–1 | Crawley Town | Coventry |
| 19:45 | Fleck 56'; McGoldrick 45', 65' | Report | Clarke 56' | Stadium: Ricoh Arena; Attendance: 8,862; Referee: Rushton |

| 10 November 2012 17 | Notts County | 1–1 | Crawley Town | Nottingham |
| 15:00 | Bishop 12' | Report | Forte 45' | Stadium: Meadow Lane; Attendance: 5,685; Referee: Haines |

| 17 November 2012 18 | Crawley Town | 2–2 | Walsall | Crawley |
| 15:00 | Clarke 22'; Forte 81' | Report | Brandy 14'; Hemmings 74' | Stadium: Broadfield Stadium; Attendance: 3,039; Referee: Phillips |

| 20 November 2012 19 | Crawley Town | 0–1 | Yeovil Town | Crawley |
| 19:45 | | Report | Hunt 90' (o.g.) | Stadium: Broadfield Stadium; Attendance: 2,912; Referee: D'Urso |

| 24 November 2012 20 | Crewe Alexandra | 2–0 | Crawley Town | Crewe |
| 15:00 | Dalla Valle 62', 65' | Report | | Stadium: Gresty Road; Attendance: 5,236; Referee: Bond |

| 8 December 2012 21 | Crawley Town | 2–2 | Shrewsbury Town | Crawley |
| 15:00 | Simpson 1', 81' | Report | Richards 14'; Taylor 34' | Stadium: Broadfield Stadium; Attendance: 2,770; Referee: Woolmer |

| 15 December 2012 22 | Stevenage | 1–2 | Crawley Town | Stevenage |
| 15:00 | Shroot 55' | Report | Akpan 65'; Bulman 69' | Stadium: Broadhall Way; Attendance: 3,066; Referee: Oliver |

| 22 December 2012 23 | Crawley Town | 0–2 | Sheffield United | Crawley |
| 15:00 | | Report | McMahon 29', 72' | Stadium: Broadfield Stadium; Attendance: 4,604; Referee: Ward |

| 26 December 2012 24 | Portsmouth | 1–2 | Crawley Town | Portsmouth |
| 15:00 | Benson 11' | Report | Adams 28'; Clarke 73' | Stadium: Fratton Park; Attendance: 13,169; Referee: East |

| 29 December 2012 25 | Bournemouth | 3–0 | Crawley Town | Bournemouth |
| 15:00 | Alexander 16' (o.g.); Pitman 40'; O'Kane 84' | Report | | Stadium: Dean Court; Attendance: 7,855; Referee: Probert |

| 1 January 2013 26 | Crawley Town | 3–0 | Colchester United | Crawley |
| 15:00 | Connolly 5'; Clarke 71'; Adams 87' | Report | | Stadium: Broadfield Stadium; Attendance: 3,160; Referee: Scott |

| 12 January 2013 27 | Tranmere Rovers | 2–0 | Crawley Town | Birkenhead |
| 15:00 | Amoo 30'; Bakayogo 39' | Report | | Stadium: Prenton Park; Attendance: 5,011; Referee: Mason |

| 2 February 2013 28 | Crawley Town | 1–1 | Swindon Town | Crawley |
| 17:20 | Clarke 23' (pen.) | Report | Rooney 59' (pen.) | Stadium: Broadfield Stadium; Attendance: 3,558; Referee: Madley |

| 9 February 2013 29 | Scunthorpe United | 2–1 | Crawley Town | Scunthorpe |
| 15:00 | Ryan 67'; Canavan 79' | Report | Sparrow 48' | Stadium: Glanford Park; Attendance: 3,124; Referee: Sarginson |

| 18 February 2013 30 | Crawley Town | 1–1 | Doncaster Rovers | Crawley |
| 19:45 | Simpson 25' | Report | Husband 43' | Stadium: Broadfield Stadium; Attendance: 3,267; Referee: D'Urso |

| 23 February 2013 31 | Leyton Orient | 0–1 | Crawley Town | Leyton |
| 15:00 | | Report | Clarke 11' | Stadium: Matchroom Stadium; Attendance: 3,463; Referee: Rushton |

| 26 February 2013 32 | Crawley Town | 1–2 | Brentford | Crawley |
| 19:45 | Adams 65' | Report | Saunders 16'; Donaldson 32' | Stadium: Broadfield Stadium; Referee: Collins |

| 2 March 2013 33 | Bury | 0–2 | Crawley Town | Bury |
| 15:00 | | Report | Proctor 17', 48' | Stadium: Gigg Lane; Attendance: 2,491; Referee: Clark |

| 5 March 2013 34 | Crawley Town | 1–1 | Carlisle United | Crawley |
| 19:45 | Sadler 56' | Report | McGovern 23' | Stadium: Broadfield Stadium; Attendance: 2,654; Referee: Sutton |

| 9 March 2013 35 | Crawley Town | 0–0 | Notts County | Crawley |
| 15:00 | | Report | | Stadium: Broadfield Stadium; Attendance: 3,689; Referee: Salisbury |

| 12 March 2013 36 | Yeovil Town | 2–2 | Crawley Town | Yeovil |
| 19:45 | Webster 5'; Madden 18' | Report | Walsh 46'; Sparrow 62' | Stadium: Huish Park; Attendance: 3,338; Referee: Adcock |

| 16 March 2013 37 | Walsall | 2–2 | Crawley Town | Walsall |
| 15:00 | Paterson 90'; Grigg 90' | Report | Proctor 52'; Hayes 71' | Stadium: Bescot Stadium; Attendance: 5,003; Referee: Simpson |

| 26 March 2013 38 | Crawley Town | 2–0 | Crewe Alexandra | Crawley |
| 19:45 | Proctor 77', 78' | Report | | Stadium: Broadfield Stadium; Attendance: 2,544; Referee: Graham |

| 29 March 2013 39 | Crawley Town | 1–1 | Stevenage | Crawley |
| 15:00 | Sparrow 55' | Report | Roberts 40' | Stadium: Broadfield Stadium; Attendance: 3,395; Referee: Malone |

| 1 April 2013 40 | Shrewsbury Town | 3–0 | Crawley Town | Shrewsbury |
| 15:00 | Eaves 48', 67', 85' | Report | | Stadium: New Meadow; Attendance: 5,196; Referee: Linington |

| 6 April 2013 41 | Milton Keynes Dons | 0–0 | Crawley Town | Milton Keynes |
| 15:00 | | Report | | Stadium: Stadium MK; Attendance: 7,746; Referee: Bond |

| 9 April 2013 42 | Sheffield United | 0–2 | Crawley Town | Sheffield |
| 19:45 | | Report | | Stadium: Bramall Lane; Attendance: 18,680; Referee: Miller |

| 13 April 2013 43 | Crawley Town | 2–0 | Coventry City | Crawley |
| 15:00 | | Report | | Stadium: Broadfield Stadium; Attendance: 3,900; Referee: Lewis |

| 20 April 2013 44 | Oldham Athletic | 1–2 | Crawley Town | Oldham |
| 15:00 | | Report | | Stadium: Boundary Park; Attendance: 4,794; Referee: Madley |

| 23 April 2013 45 | Crawley Town | 1–0 | Preston North End | Crawley |
| 19:45 | | Report | | Stadium: Broadfield Stadium; Attendance: 3,026; Referee: Hooper |

| 27 April 2013 46 | Crawley Town | 2–2 | Hartlepool United | Crawley |
| 15:00 | | Report | | Stadium: Broadfield Stadium; Attendance: 4,100; Referee: Stroud |

=== FA Cup ===
| 3 November 2012 First round | Metropolitan Police | 1–2 | Crawley Town | East Molesey |
| 15:00 | Tait 83' | Report | Simpson 36'; Clarke 69' | Stadium: Imber Court; Attendance: 1,485; Referee: Trevor Kettle |

| 1 December 2012 Second round | Crawley Town | 3–0 | Chelmsford City | Crawley |
| 15:00 | Adams 23'; Clarke 41'; Alexander 89' (pen.) | Report | | Stadium: Broadfield Stadium; Attendance: 3,012; Referee: Sarginson |

| 5 January 2013 Third round | Crawley Town | 1–3 | Reading | Crawley |
| 15:00 | Adams 1' | Report | Le Fondre 13'; Hunt 44', 49' (pen.) | Stadium: Broadfield Stadium; Attendance: 5,880; Referee: Taylor |

=== Football League Cup ===
| 14 August 2012 First round | Millwall | 2–2 (a.e.t.) (1–4 p) | Crawley Town | The Den, London |
| 19:45 BST | Ward 23'; Batt 85' | Report | Akpan 16'; Adams 56' | Attendance: 4,050; Referee: Whitestone |
| | Penalties |
| | Henderson (penalty missed); Smith (penalty missed); Trotter (penalty scored) | | (penalty scored) Alexander; (penalty scored) Bulman; (penalty scored) McFadzean; (penalty scored) Hunt |

| 28 August 2012 Second round | Crawley Town | 2–1 | Bolton Wanderers | Crawley |
| 19:45 BST | Clarke 81'; Ajose 90+2' | Report | Afobe 21' | Stadium: Broadfield Stadium; Attendance: 2,678; Referee: Scott |

| 25 September 2012 Third round | Crawley Town | 2–3 | Swansea City | Crawley |
| 19:45 BST | Simpson 45+1'; Akpan 62' | Report | Michu 27'; Graham 74'; Monk 90+2' | Stadium: Broadfield Stadium; Attendance: 3,963; Referee: Madley |

=== Football League Trophy ===
| 4 September 2012 First round | Crawley Town | 3–2 | Gillingham | Crawley |
| 19:45 | Walsh 40'; Clarke 47'; Neilson 86' | Report | Dack 22'; Montrose 49' | Stadium: Broadfield Stadium; Attendance: 1,249; Referee: Bratt |

| 9 October 2012 Second round | Brentford | 1–0 | Crawley Town | Brentford |
| 19:45 | Saunders 73' | Report | | Stadium: Griffin Park; Attendance: 2,739; Referee: Williamson |

== Transfers ==
=== Transfers in ===
Although the list below displays a previous club column, many of the players were free agents at the time of signing. The column also refers to the clubs the players were most recently contracted to, although many of them were on loan before joining Crawley.

| Date | Position | Player | Previous club | Fee | Ref. |
|---|---|---|---|---|---|
| 28 May 2012 | GK | Paul Jones | Peterborough United | Free | |
| 8 June 2012 | DF | Mat Sadler | Walsall | Free | |
| 8 June 2012 | MF | Nicky Adams | Rochdale | Free | |
| 9 July 2012 | DF | Mark Connolly | Bolton Wanderers | Free | |
| 25 July 2012 | DF | Shaun Cooper | Bournemouth | Free | |
| 24 August 2012 | DF | Joe Walsh | Swansea City | Free | |
| 31 August 2012 | MF | Mike Jones | Sheffield Wednesday | Undisclosed | |
| 1 January 2013 | FW | Lateef Elford-Alliyu | Bury | Free | |
| 10 January 2013 | MF | Matt Sparrow | Brighton & Hove Albion | Free | |
| 16 January 2013 | FW | Jamie Proctor | Swansea City | Undisclosed | |
| 23 January 2013 | DF | Mustapha Dumbuya | Portsmouth | Free | |
| 23 January 2013 | DF | Connor Essam | Gillingham | Free | |

=== Loans in ===
| Date | Position | Player | Loaned From | Duration | Ref. |
|---|---|---|---|---|---|
| 17 August 2012 | FW | Jonathan Forte | Southampton | 3 months | |
| 17 August 2012 | FW | Nicky Ajose | Peterborough United | Until January 2013 | |
| 24 September 2012 | DF | Nathan Byrne | Tottenham Hotspur | Until January 2013 | |
| 10 January 2013 | FW | Jimmy Spencer | Huddersfield Town | 4 months | |
| 29 January 2013 | GK | Jonny Maddison | Sunderland | 4 months | |
| 13 February 2013 | FW | Aiden O'Brien | Millwall | 3 months | |
| 28 February 2013 | MF | Jake Taylor | Reading | 1 month | |
| 11 March 2013 | FW | Paul Hayes | Brentford | 1 month | |

=== Transfers out ===
| Date | Position | Player | New Club | Fee | Ref. |
|---|---|---|---|---|---|
| 24 December 2012 | MF | Scott Neilson | Luton Town | Undisclosed | |
| 21 December 2012 | DF | Charlie Wassmer | Free agent | Free (released) | |
| 31 December 2012 | MF | Scott Davies | Free agent | Free (released) | |
| 8 January 2013 | MF | Hope Akpan | Reading | Undisclosed | |
| 21 January 2013 | DF | Claude Davis | Rotherham United | Free (released) | |
| 25 January 2013 | GK | Michel Kuipers | Free agent | Free (released) | |
| 31 January 2013 | FW | John Akinde | Free agent | Free (released) | |

=== Loaned out ===
| Date | Position | Player | Loaned To | Duration | Ref. |
|---|---|---|---|---|---|
| 19 July 2012 | FW | Richard Brodie | Morecambe | 6 months | |
| 19 September 2012 | MF | Scott Neilson | Grimsby Town | 3 months | |
| 4 January 2013 | MF | Richard Brodie | Grimsby Town | 4 months | |
| 24 January 2013 | DF | Shaun Cooper | Portsmouth | 1 month | |
| 31 January 2013 | FW | Gary Alexander | AFC Wimbledon | 4 months | |

== Statistics ==
All statistics accurate as of 7 June 2013.

=== Quick Stats/Facts ===
| League goals scored | 59 (1.28 goals per game) |
| All goals scored | 74 (1.37 goals per game) |
| League goals conceded | 58 (1.26 goals per game) |
| All goals conceded | 71 (1.31 goals per game) |
| Fastest goal | Nicky Adams (14 seconds) vs Reading (5 January 2013) |
| Biggest wins | 3 – 0 vs Scunthorpe United (18 August 2012); 3 – 0 vs Colchester United (1 January 2013) |
| Highest scoring game | 2 – 5 vs Tranmere Rovers (22 September 2012) |
| Longest unbeaten run (league) | 7 games |
| Longest winless run (league) | 7 games |
| Longest losing run (league) | 2 games |
| Televised games | 0 – 3 vs Portsmouth (9 September 2012 – Sky Sports 1); 1 – 1 vs Swindon Town (2 February 2013 – Sky Sports 2); 1 – 1 vs Doncaster Rovers (18 February 2013 – Sky Sports 1) |

=== Top scorers ===
| Player | Position | Nation | League One | FA Cup | League Cup | League Trophy | Total |
|---|---|---|---|---|---|---|---|
| Billy Clarke | FW | (Republic of Ireland) | 8 | 2 | 1 | 1 | 12 |
| Nicky Adams | MF | (Wales) | 8 | 2 | 1 | 0 | 11 |
| Hope Akpan | MF | (England) | 4 | 0 | 2 | 0 | 6 |
| Josh Simpson | MF | (England) | 4 | 1 | 1 | 0 | 6 |
| Jamie Proctor | FW | (England) | 5 | 0 | 0 | 0 | 5 |
| Gary Alexander | FW | (England) | 4 | 1 | 0 | 0 | 5 |
| Kyle McFadzean | DF | (England) | 3 | 0 | 0 | 0 | 3 |
| Jonathan Forte | FW | (Barbados) | 3 | 0 | 0 | 0 | 3 |
| Matt Sparrow | MF | (England) | 3 | 0 | 0 | 0 | 3 |
| Nicky Ajose | FW | (England) | 2 | 0 | 1 | 0 | 3 |
| Joe Walsh | DF | (Wales) | 2 | 0 | 0 | 1 | 3 |
| Nathan Byrne | DF | (England) | 1 | 0 | 0 | 0 | 1 |
| Dannie Bulman | MF | (England) | 1 | 0 | 0 | 0 | 1 |
| Mark Connolly | DF | (Republic of Ireland) | 1 | 0 | 0 | 0 | 1 |
| Paul Hayes | FW | (England) | 1 | 0 | 0 | 0 | 1 |
| Mat Sadler | DF | (England) | 1 | 0 | 0 | 0 | 1 |
| Scott Neilson | MF | (Wales) | 0 | 0 | 0 | 1 | 1 |
| Total | | | 51 | 6 | 6 | 3 | 66 |

=== Win Percentage ===
Competition
| Competition | G | W | D | L | Win % |
|---|---|---|---|---|---|
| League One | 46 | 18 | 14 | 14 | 39.13 |
| FA Cup | 3 | 2 | 0 | 1 | 66.67 |
| League Cup | 3 | 2 | 0 | 1 | 66.67 |
| League Trophy | 2 | 1 | 0 | 1 | 50.00 |
| Total | 54 | 23 | 14 | 17 | 42.59 |
