= Matt Tubbs =

English association football player

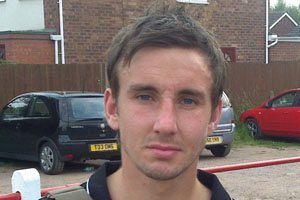
- Tubbs in 2011

Personal information
- Full name: Matthew Stephen Tubbs
- Date of birth: 15 July 1984 (age 42)
- Place of birth: Salisbury, England
- Height: 5 ft 9 in (1.75 m)
- Position: Striker

Youth career
- –2001: AFC Bournemouth
- 2001–2003: Bolton Wanderers
- 2003: AFC Bournemouth

Senior career*
Years	Team	Apps	(Gls)
2003	Dorchester Town		
2003–2010	Salisbury City	248	(108)
2008	→ AFC Bournemouth (loan)	8	(1)
2010–2012	Crawley Town	65	(49)
2012–2015	AFC Bournemouth	38	(7)
2013–2014	→ Rotherham United (loan)	17	(1)
2014	→ Crawley Town (loan)	18	(8)
2014–2015	→ AFC Wimbledon (loan)	22	(12)
2015–2016	Portsmouth	39	(14)
2016	→ Eastleigh (loan)	16	(2)
2016	Forest Green Rovers	12	(2)
2016	→ Woking (loan)	6	(3)
2016–2017	Sutton United	5	(2)
2017	Eastleigh	9	(2)
2017–2018	Havant & Waterlooville	25	(7)
2017	→ Weymouth (loan)	6	(1)
2018–2019	Gosport Borough		
2022–2023	Bashley		

International career
2007	England C	2	(2)

Managerial career
- 2022–2023: Bashley
- 2023–2024: Poole Town
- * Club domestic league appearances and goals as of 4 February 2022 (UTC)

Matthew Stephen Tubbs (born 15 July 1984) is an English professional footballer who was most recently manager of Poole Town.

Having started his football career, Tubbs joined Salisbury City and quickly made an impact throughout his time at the club, having "played a key role in Salisbury City's rise up the non-league pyramid in recent seasons". This is due to his "great pace and being an effective striker." After joining Crawley Town, he continued his success by helping the club get promoted to League Two in the 2010–11 season. However, after leaving Crawley Town, The False Nine website mentioned about his career decline despite being the League Two's top scorer in the 2014–15 season while playing for AFC Wimbledon and Portsmouth.

== Club career ==
=== Early career ===
Born in Salisbury, Wiltshire, Tubbs played for AFC Bournemouth as a schoolboy and his performance earned him a contract until the end of the 2000–01 season, having progressed through the club's youth system. However, Tubbs was told by Bournemouth that he would not be offered a new contract when the 2000–01 season ends. As a result, he went on a trial with different clubs before winning a two-year scholarship with Bolton Wanderers. Tubbs regularly played in the reserve team.

Two years later, Tubbs rejoined Bournemouth on non-contract terms in 2003, before dropping into non-League football with Dorchester Town. His time at Dorchester Town lasted two months after they let him go. By the time he departed from the club, Tubbs made eleven appearances and scoring two times for Dorchester Town.

=== Salisbury City ===
Tubbs signed for Salisbury City in October 2003, making his debut against Fleet Town. He previously went on a trial with the club two months prior before joining them. After adding three more goals, including a brace in a 2–0 win against Corby Town on 15 November 2003, Tubbs signed a two–year contract with Salisbury City. He went on to score four more braces on four separate occasions later in the 2003–04 season. At the end of the 2003–04 season, Tubbs made forty–two appearances and scoring twenty–one times in all competitions.

At the start of the 2004–05 season, Tubbs continued to be in the first team regular for Salisbury City despite his goal scoring form dropped, only scoring three goals in the first half of the season. He found himself plagued with injuries along the way. Despite this, Tubbs went on to score five more goals in the second half of the season. At the end of the 2004–05 season, he made thirty–three appearances and scoring times in all competitions.

At the start of the 2005–06 season, Tubbs continued to regain his first team place and coming a regular goal scorer within the side. Despite suffering injuries throughout the season, it didn't affect his goal scoring form, as he scored a total of eighteen goals, including two braces against Chesham United on 10 December 2005 and Northwood on 31 December 2005. Tubbs helped Salisbury City rise through the leagues, helping the club's promotion to the Conference South. As for the reward, he was picked out in the Southern Premier League's Team of the Year. At the end of the 2005–06 season, he made thirty–one appearances and scoring eighteen times in all competitions.

In the 2006–07 season, Tubbs continued to his regain his place in the first team, forming a partnership with Paul Sales once more. He was again a major part of City's success in the Conference South, scoring many important goals for the side. Tubbs scored an equaliser against Nottingham Forest in the second round of the FA Cup to take the tie to a replay, in front of the BBC cameras. After the match, Mark Lawrenson said about his performance, saying: "This fella (Tubbs), on that evidence, can play at a higher level, which is the best compliment you can give him." However, in the replay match, the club lost 2–0, eliminating them from the tournament. He got sent off for the fourth time of the season against his former club, Dorchester Town. This resulted in a six-game ban for the striker. Tubbs previously got sent–off three times earlier in the 2006–07 season. In the 2007 Conference South play-off Final, he scored the winner in the 81st minute to send his side to the Conference Premier. This was the 30th goal of the season for the striker, and he was rewarded with an England National Game XI call up that summer. Despite being sidelined on several occasions throughout the 2006–07 season, Tubbs made forty–two appearances and scoring thirty times in all competitions. During the same summer, he was linked with a £100,000 move to Leicester City. However, Tubbs committed his long-term future to Salisbury by signing a full-time contract with the club. As a result, he quit his job as leisure attendant to play football full-time.

Ahead of the 2007–08 season, Tubbs suffered a knee injury during Salisbury City's pre–season tour, but managed to recover quickly weeks later. He started the season well by scoring three goals in the first five league matches of the season. His performance earned him a nomination for the Blue Square Premier player of the month award but lost out to Leo Fortune-West. Since the start of the 2007–08 season, Tubbs continued to regain his first team place, as he continued to score regular for the club. This includes scoring three braces on three separate occasions throughout the season. He then scored his 100th goal for Salisbury City in a 3–3 draw against Histon, with a last minute equaliser on 21 March 2008. Despite being sidelined on several occasions throughout the 2007–08 season, Tubbs finished as the club's leading goal scorer with sixteen goals in forty–two appearances in all competitions.

However, in the 2008–09 season, Tubbs continued to regain his first team place, but struggled to score as he did in the previous season. Tubbs only scored once on 23 August 2008, in a 1–0 win against Grays Athletic. After his return from loan at Bournemouth, he returned to the first team, coming on as a 48th-minute substitute, in a 2–0 loss against Oxford United on 2 January 2009. However, Tubbs struggled for form, scoring only three goals in the 2008–09 season. At the end of the season, he made thirty–four appearances and scoring three times in all competitions.

At the start of the 2009–10 season, Tubbs continued to regain his first team place, as he began to regain his goal scoring form for Salisbury City. It wasn't until on 3 September 2009 when Tubbs scored a hat–trick, in a 4–3 win against Hayes & Yeading United. His goal scoring form continued, as he eventually scored eleven in the first fifteen matches of the season. Tubbs remained with the club, despite much speculation surrounding his future. Having scored four more goals, including a brace against Histon on 23 January 2010, it was announced on 10 February 2010 that he committed to a further two years to the Whites. Shortly after, Tubbs, once again, scored four more goals in the next three matches, including a brace against Crawley Town on 2 March 2010. Later in the 2009–10 season, he scored many goals to help the club climb out of the relegation zone after a points deduction for going into administration that saw the club demoted two leagues for 'breaking rules'. At the end of the 2009–10 season, Tubbs went on to make fifty–two appearances and scoring thirty–two appearances in all competitions, making the league's top–scorer alongside Richard Brodie.

==== AFC Bournemouth (loan) ====
On 20 November 2008, Tubbs returned to former side Bournemouth on loan until the new year, in a move to reduce playing costs at Salisbury.

He made his Bournemouth debut, coming on as a 73rd-minute substitute, in a 3–3 draw against Grimsby Town on 21 November 2008. During his time back at Dean Court, Tubbs made just eight league appearances and scored on one occasion. He was expected to sign for Bournemouth when the transfer window opened on 1 January 2009 but the move never materialised.

=== Crawley Town ===
On 1 July 2010, Tubbs signed a two-year deal with Conference Premier club Crawley Town for a club record fee, officially undisclosed but later confirmed to be £55,000. Upon joining Crawley Town, Manager Steve Evans said: "Two weeks ago it was never in my wildest dreams that Matt Tubbs would have been signing for us but he is here and he will prove to be a very valuable player for us in the season ahead. As everyone knows his main attribute is that he is a top class goalscorer but as importantly he is also a team player and that was also a key decision of mine when I decided to sign him."

Tubbs made his Crawley Town debut, starting the whole game, in a 1–0 loss against Grimsby Town in the opening game of the season. In a follow–up match against Cheltenham Town, he scored his first goals for the club, in a 2–2 draw. His impact at Crawley Town resulted in a transfer bid from an unnamed League One club, which the club rejected despite his being there for only a month. Tubbs quickly established himself in the starting eleven, as the club's key striker. He scored six goals in four matches between 18 September 2010 and 29 September 2010, including braces against Gateshead and Tamworth. Tubbs' goal scoring form continued when he again scored six goals in five matches between 30 October 2010 and 26 November 2010, including a hat–trick against Altrincham and a FA Cup tie against Swindon Town. At the start of the second half of the season, Tubbs scored important goals for Crawley Town, including two braces against Eastbourne Borough, Forest Green Rovers and Bath City; the only goal in Crawley's 1–0 win over Torquay United in the fourth round of the FA Cup, enabling the club to face Manchester United in the fifth round; and a hat–trick against Wrexham. Tubbs' goal scoring form continued to play a role, including a brace in a 3–0 win against Tamworth on 9 April 2011 that saw the club clinch the title, resulting in their promotion to League Two; and another hat–trick against Rushden & Diamonds. He was named to the Conference Team of the Year for the 2010–11 season. His first season at the club saw him score 37 goals in Conference Premier ties, and 40 goals in 48 appearances across all competitions, making him the league's top–scorer. This remained the league record until 2016.

At the start of the second season with Crawley Town in League Two, Tubbs started the season well for the club when he scored the winning goal in a 3–2 win against AFC Wimbledon in the preliminary round of the League Cup. Tubbs continued to be Crawley Town's main striker, scoring four goals in the club's first six league matches of the season, including a brace against Southend United on 16 August 2011. Tubbs went on a goal scoring spree when he scored six goals in four matches between 3 December 2011 and 26 December 2011, including a hat–trick against Redbridge in the second round of the FA Cup. His goal scoring led to other clubs becoming interest in signing him. Amid transfer speculation, he scored two goals in the FA Cup, winning both matches against Bristol City and Hull City. By the time Tubbs departed from the club at the end of January, he was the top scorer in League Two, scoring twelve times in thirty–one season appearances and eighteen times across all competitions. Despite his departure, his contributions helped Crawley Town gain promotion to League One that season.

=== AFC Bournemouth (permanent basis) ===
On 30 January 2012, Tubbs signed for League One club AFC Bournemouth for a fee believed to be in the region of £800,000 on a 3 1/2-year contract. Upon leaving Crawley Town, the club's manager Evans admitted to "shedding a tear" when he tried right up until the final minutes to persuade the player to stay. Tubbs even admitted it was a tough decision to leave Crawley Town.

He scored on his debut for his new club against Exeter City in a 2–0 win and set-up Scott Malone for a second goal in the match. After scoring his first goal on his debut, Tubbs expressed his relief and delight on scoring on his debut and told BBC Radio Solent "On your debut you want to try and get your first goal as quickly as you can and I was lucky enough to get mine tonight, it was great to be back. This is my home-town club and the one I supported as a kid. The standing ovation at the end was nice." Tubbs, however, struggled for form at Bournemouth during his first half-season before undergoing a groin operation in April 2012 which led to him missing the rest of the season. At the end of the 2011–12 season, he made seven appearances and scoring once in all competitions.

However at the start of the 2012–13 season, Tubbs found his playing time, mostly coming from the substitute bench and was behind the pecking order of the likes of striker, such as, Josh McQuoid, Lewis Grabban and Brett Pitman. Over the summer, he was linked a move to Rotherham United on loan, a chance that would see him reunited with Manager Evans. However, the move never happened after Bournemouth rejected a bid from Rotherham United for Tubbs. Following this, he did contribute for Bournemouth, scoring two goals in two matches between 15 September 2012 and 18 September 2012 against Hartlepool United and Brentford. A month later on 23 October 2012, Tubbs scored the club's third goal of the game, to equalise, in a 3–3 draw against Notts County. Manager Eddie Howe acknowledged his lack of first team football but wanted to keep him to help Bournemouth's target. This proved to be paid-off, as he scored three more goals later in the 2012–13 season and helped the club reach promotion to the Championship. At the end of the season, Tubbs went on to make thirty–five appearances and scoring six times in all competitions.

==== Rotherham United (loan) ====
Ahead of the 2013–14 season, Tubbs was not included in Bournemouth's pre–season tour, due to suffering from an injury. Amid to the situation, he was linked a move away from the club. On 27 July 2013, Rotherham United signed Tubbs on loan from Bournemouth until the end of January.

Tubbs made his debut for Rotherham United, coming on as a 50th-minute substitute, in a 3–3 draw against Crewe Alexandra in the opening game of the season. He then scored his first goal, in a 2–2 draw against Colchester United on 2 November 2013. However, Tubbs was unable to reproduce his goal scoring form, only scoring once and had his playing time coming from the sub. On 6 January 2014, Rotherham United announced that Tubbs had returned to his parent club.

==== Return to Crawley Town (loan) ====
On 6 January 2014, Matt Tubbs made a one-month loan return to Crawley Town. Upon joining the club, he credited the supporters for playing a 'massive part' in his return.

Tubbs made his Crawley Town debut, starting the whole game, in a 2–2 draw against Coventry City on 12 January 2014. Four days later on 16 January 2014, the club announced that the loan had been extended until the end of the 2013–14 season. On 25 January 2014, he scored in a 2–2 draw against his former loan-club Rotherham United and then netted in the next four fixtures, as the club extended their unbeaten run to six matches. Since making his debut for Crawley Town, Tubbs became a first team regular for the side, forming a striking partnership with Billy Clarke. Despite suffering from a hamstring injury later in the 2013–14 season, he went on to make eighteen appearances and scored eight times in all competitions.

Following this, Crawley Town tried to sign Tubbs on a permanent basis. However, he turned down a move to re–join the club in favour of AFC Wimbledon.

==== AFC Wimbledon (loan) ====
On 16 June 2014, Tubbs joined AFC Wimbledon on a season-long loan. Upon joining the club, he was given the number nine shirt ahead of the new season.

On 9 August 2014, Tubbs scored on his competitive debut for AFC Wimbledon against Shrewsbury Town in a 2–2 draw. This was followed up by scoring his second goal for the club, in a 3–1 loss against rivals, Milton Keynes Dons. His goal scoring form continued in the next seven matches, including scoring a brace against Carlisle United on 6 September 2014. However, during a match against Burton Albion on 16 September 2014, in which he scored, Tubbs was sent–off for a second bookable offence, in a 3–0 win, and served a one match suspension. Nevertheless, he was named the League Two player of the month for August. Despite the suspension, Tubbs became a first-team regular for the club, establishing himself as a key striker. He later scored five more goals for Wimbledon, including a brace against York City in the first-round replay of the FA Cup. On 6 January 2015, Tubbs was recalled early from his loan ahead of a permanent transfer to another club. By the time he left the club, Tubbs had made 30 appearances and scored 15 times in all competitions.

=== Portsmouth ===
Tubbs terminated his contract with Bournemouth, and shortly after, on 8 January, he signed a 2 1/2-year deal for League Two club Portsmouth.

Tubbs made his debut for the club, starting the whole game on 10 January 2015, as they lost 1–0 against Newport County. Since making his debut for Portsmouth, he quickly established himself in the starting eleven, playing as the key striker. Tubbs scored his first goal for the club on 7 February of the same year at home against Hartlepool United in a 1–0 win. On 21 February 2015, he scored his first Pompey hat-trick in a 6–2 away victory against Cambridge United. Tubbs later scored five more goals for the club in the 2014–15 season. At the end of the 2014–15 season, Tubbs had made twenty–three appearances and scored nine times for Portsmouth. Combining his time at both Portsmouth and AFC Wimbledon, he was the top scorer in League Two, with twenty–one goals. Tubbs was included in League Two's PFA Team of the Year.

At the start of the 2015–16 season, Tubbs continued to play on the first team, alternating between the starting line–up and substitute role. On 15 August 2015 he scored his first goal of the season, in a 2–1 win against Plymouth Argyle. Two weeks later on 29 August 2015, Tubbs scored his second goal of the season, in a 2–1 win against Luton Town. Two months later on 10 October 2015, he scored his second Pompey hat-trick in a 3–1 win against Cambridge United. This was followed up by scoring the only goal of the game, in a 1–0 win against Newport County. By November, however, Tubbs found himself out of favour in the first team and never played for the club again. By the time he was loaned out, Tubbs had made seventeen appearances and scored five times.

==== Eastleigh (loan) ====
On 9 February 2016, Tubbs joined National League club Eastleigh on loan until the end of the season.

On the same day, he made his Eastleigh debut, starting the whole game, in a 3–2 loss against Kidderminster Harriers. It wasn't until on 12 March 2016 when Tubbs scored his first goal for the club, in a 1–0 win against Chester. He then set up two goals in two matches between 12 April 2016 and 16 April 2016 against Barrow and Altrincham. In the last game of the season against Woking, Tubbs scored his second goal for Eastleigh, in a 2–1 loss. Despite missing one match, he continued to be in the first team regular for the side, playing in the striker position. At the end of the 2015–16 season, Tubbs had made seventeen appearances and scored twice, across all competitions.

=== Forest Green Rovers ===
Following his loan spell at Eastleigh came to an end, Tubbs was placed on the transfer list. On 13 July 2016, he joined Forest Green Rovers on a one-year contract after terminating his contract with Portsmouth. Tubbs made his debut on the opening day of the 2016–17 season as a substitute in a 1–0 away loss at Boreham Wood. His first goal for the club came in his next appearance on 9 August 2016 in a 1–1 home draw with Sutton United. A week later on 20 August 2016, he scored his second goal for Forest Green Rovers, in a 2–1 win against York City. By the time Tubbs departed from the club on two occasions, he made twelve appearances and scoring two times in all competitions.

On 28 September 2016, Tubbs joined Woking on loan for one month. Three days later on 1 October 2016, he scored his first Woking goal on his debut in a 3–3 draw against Eastleigh. Tubbs later scored two more goals, coming against Sutton United and Barrow. He made six appearances for returning to his parent club.

=== Sutton United ===
On 1 December 2016, Tubbs signed for Sutton United on a permanent contract.

Two days later, he made his club debut and scored the first goal in a 2–1 victory over League Two side Cheltenham Town in the second round of the FA Cup at Gander Green Lane, helping to send Sutton through to the third round for the first time in 22 years. On 21 January 2017, Tubbs scored his first league goal for Sutton in a 1–1 home draw against Eastleigh. His second league goal for the club came on 14 February 2017, in a 2–1 loss against Guiseley He appeared five times for Sutton United before leaving them in March 2017.

=== Eastleigh ===
On 10 March 2017, Tubbs re-signed for Eastleigh on a contract until the end of 2016–17 season.

The day after he signed for the club, Tubbs made his second Eastleigh debut and scored the first goal in a 2–0 victory over Barrow. He became a first team regular for the club for the rest of the 2016–17 season and rotated between the starting eleven and substitute bench. In the last game of the season against Wrexham, Tubbs scored his second goal for Eastleigh, in a 1–1 draw. At the end of the 2016–17 season, he made nine appearances and scored twice. Following this, Tubbs was released by the club.

=== Havant & Waterlooville ===
On 15 May 2017, Tubbs signed a two-year contract with newly promoted National League South club Havant & Waterlooville. By that time, he started acquiring his UEFA B coaching licence and planned to study for the UEFA A qualification.

Tubbs made his Havant & Waterlooville debut on 8 August 2017, coming on as a 60th-minute substitute in a 3–2 win against Eastbourne Borough. He appeared four more times before being loaned out to Weymouth. After he returned to the side, it wasn't until on 16 December 2017 when Tubbs scored his first goal for Havant & Waterlooville, in a 3–1 loss against Billericay Town. This was followed up by scoring his second goal for the club, in a 4–1 win against Eastbourne Borough. Since returning to the first team, he regained his first team and began scoring goals, including two consecutive braces against Bognor Regis Town and Oxford City. Tubbs later scored two more goals for Havant & Waterlooville, as the club won the 2017–18 National League South after beating Concord Rangers in the last game of the season. At the end of the season, he went on to make twenty–five appearances and scoring seven times in all competitions. Following this, Tubbs left Havant & Waterlooville.

==== Weymouth (loan) ====
On 3 October 2017, Tubbs joined Weymouth on a one-month loan deal. He made six appearances and scored once before returning to his parent club.

=== Gosport Borough ===
In June 2018, Tubbs was appointed as player-coach at Gosport Borough under Craig McAllister, the club's newly appointed manager.

However, his time at Gosport Borough was disastrous as they were eliminated in all cup competitions quickly and struggled in the league. It again came down to the last game of the season, with Gosport's draw at Met Police enough to survive thanks to a loss by relegation rivals Basingstoke Town.

On 1 May 2019, both Tubbs and manager Craig McAllister parted ways with the club after a disappointing season.

=== Bashley ===
On 2 February 2022, Tubbs joined Wessex League Premier Division side Bashley as player-coach. He was appointed manager in December 2022.

== International career ==
In May 2007, Tubbs was called up to the England C squad for the first time. He scored on his international debut, before picking up an injury which left him out of the remainder of the Four Nations Tournament. Tubbs earned two caps for England C in which he scored one goal in each game.

== Managerial career ==
On 4 September 2023, Tubbs was appointed manager of Southern Premier Division South club Poole Town. After just six months in charge, he resigned in March 2024 with the club sitting in mid-table.

== Career statistics ==
As of match played 28 April 2018

Appearances and goals by club, season and competition
Club	Season	League			FA Cup		League Cup		Other		Total	
Club	Season	Division	Apps	Goals	Apps	Goals	Apps	Goals	Apps	Goals	Apps	Goals
Salisbury City	2003–04	Southern League Eastern Division	42	21	0	0	—		0	0	42	21
Salisbury City	2004–05	Isthmian League Premier Division	32	8	1	0	—		0	0	33	8
Salisbury City	2005–06	Southern League Premier Division	27	16	0	0	—		4 (Note: Appearance(s) in FA Trophy)	2	31	18
Salisbury City	2006–07	Conference South	31	18	4	2	—		7 (Note: Four appearances and four goals in FA Trophy, three appearances and two goals in Conference South play-offs)	6	42	26
Salisbury City	2007–08	Conference Premier	42	16	2	0	—		0	0	44	16
Salisbury City	2008–09	Conference Premier	32	3	1	0	—		1	0	34	3
Salisbury City	2009–10	Conference Premier	42	26	3	4	—		7	2	52	32
Salisbury City	Total		248	108	11	6	—		19	10	278	124
AFC Bournemouth (loan)	2008–09	League Two	8	1	—		—		—		8	1
Crawley Town	2010–11	Conference Premier	41	37	6	3	—		1	0	48	40
Crawley Town	2011–12	League Two	24	12	4	5	2	1	1 (Note: Appearance(s) in Football League Trophy)	0	31	18
Crawley Town	Total		65	49	10	8	2	1	2	0	79	58
AFC Bournemouth	2011–12	League One	7	1	—		—		—		7	1
AFC Bournemouth	2012–13	League One	31	6	3	0	1	0	0	0	35	6
AFC Bournemouth	Total		38	7	3	0	1	0	0	0	42	7
Rotherham United (loan)	2013–14	League One	17	1	1	0	2	0	1	0	21	1
Crawley Town (loan)	2013–14	League One	18	8	—		—		—		18	8
AFC Wimbledon (loan)	2014–15	League Two	22	12	4	2	1	1	3	0	30	15
Portsmouth	2014–15	League Two	23	9	—		—		—		23	9
Portsmouth	2015–16	League Two	16	5	0	0	1	0	0	0	17	5
Portsmouth	Total		39	14	0	0	1	0	0	0	40	14
Eastleigh (loan)	2015–16	National League	16	2	—		—		—		16	2
Forest Green Rovers	2016–17	National League	12	2	—		—		—		12	2
Woking (loan)	2016–17	National League	6	3	—		—		—		6	3
Sutton United	2016–17	National League	5	2	3	1	—		4	0	12	3
Eastleigh	2016–17	National League	9	2	—		—		—		9	2
Havant & Waterlooville	2017–18	National League South	25	7	1	0	—		2	1	28	8
Weymouth (loan)	2017–18	Southern League Premier Division	6	1	—		—		1 (Note: Appearance in Southern League Cup)	2	7	3
Career total			534	219	33	17	7	2	32	13	576	251

== Honours ==
Salisbury City

- Southern Football League Premier Division: 2005–06
- Conference South play-offs: 2007

Crawley Town

- Conference Premier: 2010–11

AFC Bournemouth

- Football League One runner-up: 2012–13

Individual

- PFA Fans' Player of the Year: 2014–15 League Two
- Southern Football League Premier Division Team of the Year: 2005–06
- Conference Premier Team of the Year: 2010–11
- PFA Team of the Year: 2014–15 League Two
