= Scott Neilson =

Welsh footballer

Personal information
- Full name: Scott Steven Neilson
- Date of birth: 15 May 1987 (age 39)
- Place of birth: Enfield, England
- Height: 5 ft 8 in (1.73 m)
- Position: Midfielder

Youth career
- Norwich City
- Charlton Athletic

Senior career*
Years	Team	Apps	(Gls)
2005–2006	Hertford Town	26	(4)
2006–2008	Ware	62	(34)
2008–2009	Cambridge City	48	(13)
2009–2010	Bradford City	24	(1)
2010	→ Cambridge United (loan)	14	(3)
2010–2013	Crawley Town	57	(8)
2012	→ Grimsby Town (loan)	10	(1)
2013	Luton Town	8	(1)
2013–2015	Grimsby Town	56	(11)
2015–2016	Whitehawk	30	(10)
2016–2017	Hemel Hempstead Town	12	(1)
2017	Royston Town	2	(0)
Total		349	(87)

International career
- Wales schoolboy
- * Club domestic league appearances and goals

Scott Steven Neilson (born 15 May 1987) is an English-born Welsh former professional footballer who played as a midfielder.

Neilson started his career alongside his brother, at first Hertford Town and then Ware, before he earned a move to Cambridge City. He made his name in non-league as a goal-scoring winger and he came to the attention of a number of league clubs. He had trials with three of them and eventually won a move to League Two side Bradford City. He scored a goal on his full debut but Bradford soon changed manager and Neilson dropped back into non-league, first out on loan to Cambridge United and then signed by Crawley Town, having spent less than 12 months with Bradford. Neilson spent a short but successful loan spell with Grimsby Town in 2012, and then joined Luton on a short-term contract in January 2013 before his release a few months later. He returned to Grimsby permanently before joining Whitehawk.

== Early life ==
Neilson was born on 15 May 1987 in Enfield, London, to David and Amanda Neilson, the latter who was born in Swansea. He has an older brother, Tony. His maternal grandfather is Cliff Jones, the former Tottenham Hotspur and Welsh international footballer, whose father Ivor and brother Bryn were also professional footballers and Welsh internationals. Neilson has also worked as a plumber.

== Career ==
=== Non-league ===
Neilson was a member of Norwich City's youth teams at the age of 11, went on to Charlton Athletic and also won schoolboy honours for Wales. His senior career started at his brother Tony's club Hertford Town of the Isthmian League in 2005. He was top goalscorer for the reserves when he made his debut on 25 October in an Isthmian League Associate Members Trophy game against Clapton, before going on to play 15 games in his first season and scoring one goal. In his second season, he played 24 games upping his goal tally by another nine, before he earned a move in December 2006 to Ware – a second club where his brother also played. In one game in January 2008, Neilson came off the bench to score four goals for Ware against Tilbury in a 5–2 victory. The goals went towards Neilson's total of 23 from 40 games for Ware in the Isthmian League First Division North, helping Ware towards the end-of-season play-offs. However, he left Ware before the end of the season to join Cambridge City in March 2008 for the rest of the club's Conference South campaign.

Neilson's debut at Cambridge City came three days later in a 3–1 defeat to Lewes, when he came off the bench in the second half. He played seven games, starting all but his debut performance, with six games coming in the league. He scored three goals in his seven matches. He also scored in the Cambridge Invitational Cup final as Cambridge recorded a 3–0 victory against Histon reserves to lift the cup for a record 12th time. Despite an enforced relegation, Neilson stayed at Cambridge for the following season and signed a new contract in first April and then October 2008. He played a total of 49 games in his first full season with the Lilywhites, 40 of which were in the league, scoring a total of 11 league goals and two cup goals. He also helped Cambridge defend their Cambridge Invitational Cup crown with a 1–0 defeat of CRC.

Neilson signed a new one-year contract with Cambridge City in July 2009. However, his form also attracted a number of league clubs and, at the start of the 2009–10 season he had trials with sides Norwich City, Derby County and Bradford City and was offered a trial with Hartlepool United. Neilson scored twice in a reserve game for Bradford as part of his trial, prompting a bid to buy the winger. Bradford's first bid was turned down but they had an improved bid accepted later the same week. The fee remained undisclosed but included a 25 per cent sell-on fee entitling Cambridge City to a share of any fee Bradford received for selling Neilson on to another club – a year later, another manager Martin Ling revealed the initial fee that Cambridge received to be £20,000. Neilson had played a further two league games for Cambridge before his departure.

=== Bradford City ===
Neilson signed a three-year deal with League Two side Bradford City in August 2009, and was given a place on the substitutes' bench for the club's next game with Torquay United, which Bradford won 2–0 with Neilson coming on for Joe Colbeck. Colbeck was sold three days later and so Neilson made his full debut in a Football League Trophy game with Rochdale. Neilson capped his debut with the winning goal in a 2–1 victory to send City through to the second round for the first time in four years. At the end of his full first full month with the club, Neilson scored his first league goal in professional football during a 3–0 win against Chesterfield, which helped to extend Bradford's unbeaten run to seven games. The club's form did not last and following a run of poor results, manager Stuart McCall left in February 2010 to be replaced by Peter Taylor. Neilson played in Taylor's first game in charge as City lost 2–0 to Accrington Stanley.

However, Taylor criticised Neilson for his lack of fitness, and as a result the winger did not feature in any of the following three games and was instead loaned out to Cambridge United initially on a month-long loan to act as cover for Antonio Murray and Robbie Willmott, who were suspended and injured respectively. He capped his debut for Cambridge United on 6 March 2010 against Barrow by scoring the only goal of the game to give his new side a 1–0 victory. After scoring another two goals, Cambridge extended Neilson's loan with manager Martin Ling saying he would "assess the situation in the summer". He played in all 14 of Cambridge's games during his loan spell and scored three goals helping them finish in the top-half of the table before he returned to Bradford at the end of the Conference Premier season.

Neilson returned to the first-team squad at City ahead of their 2010–11 season and received praise from his manager, who said: "He's obviously got very good talent, he can get goals and I think he'll do well. It's down to him really." Neilson played in City's first game of the League Two campaign – only his second under Taylor – but City lost 3–1 to Shrewsbury Town with Neilson replaced by debutant Louis Moult in the second-half. Neilson was substituted at half-time in the club's next game and then dropped for the next league match, before he was sold to Conference side Crawley Town for officially an undisclosed five-figure sum, although it was reported to be anywhere from £15,000 to £50,000. Neilson had played 30 games for Bradford in all competitions.

=== Crawley Town ===
Neilson said he was "delighted to have joined such an ambitious club" and his new manager Steve Evans revealed the club had been interested in him for some time and Crawley had made several previous bids for the winger, which were all rejected. Neilson made his debut the following day against Cambridge United, the club where he had spent the latter part of the previous season on loan. The game finished 2–2, but Neilson's mistake allowed Cambridge to begin their fightback from an early two-goal deficit. Crawley soon went on a good run of form to go top of the table – Neilson's first goal for the club came in a 2–0 win at home to Kidderminster Harriers at the start of October to extend that lead over AFC Wimbledon to three points. He followed it up by scoring four goals in the next seven games, including one in the FA Cup on his return to West Yorkshire in a 5–0 win against Guiseley. In February, Neilson broke a toe in his left foot. Neilson missed three months of the season, including an FA Cup game against Manchester United at Old Trafford, but returned for the final five games of Crawley's promotion campaign. He finished with 27 league appearances and scored five goals.

On 19 September 2012 he joined Grimsby Town on a three-month loan deal. Towards the end of his stay at Blundell Park, Grimsby manager Paul Hurst admitted his desire to sign Neilson on a permanent deal following an impressive loan spell. Following his final game for the club, a 1–0 victory over promotion rivals Wrexham which put Grimsby on top of the table, Hurst admitted that it was unlikely that Neilson would be returning to Grimsby despite making him a good offer. Neilson departed Grimsby on 21 December 2012 having played ten league games, scoring a single goal.

=== Luton Town ===
Neilson signed for Luton Town on a contract until the end of the season following the end of his loan at Grimsby on 24 December 2012, though he officially joined the club on 1 January 2013 when the transfer window opened. The move also confirmed that Neilson would transfer to a more local side after rejecting a move to Grimsby having not desired relocating himself to the north of England. Neilson's contract was not extended and he was released by Luton at the end of the 2012–13 season after playing in 8 games and scoring once.

=== Grimsby Town ===
Following his release from Luton, Neilson spoke about his desire to return to Grimsby Town. On 13 May 2013, Neilson signed a one-year deal with The Mariners.

On 9 February 2015, Neilson had his contract terminated with Grimsby Town by mutual consent.

=== Non League ===
On 14 February 2015, Neilson signed for Conference South side Whitehawk on a free transfer. Neilson went on to play for Hemel Hempstead Town and Royston Town during the 2016–17 season.

== Playing style ==
Neilson is a midfielder, who likes to play on the right wing, but has also been used in a more central role. Despite playing in midfield, Neilson has been known for scoring goals. One of his former teammates Lee Bullock said he was "a winger who looks like he's got some decent skills" while Paul Carden, his assistant manager at Cambridge United, said: "You can see he's an intelligent player and very quick ... he catches the eye because he can go past people and is good with the ball at his feet." Neilson, however, was also told to improve his crossing ability and criticised for his lack of fitness by former manager Peter Taylor.

== Personal life ==
He comes from a footballing family being the grandson of Cliff Jones and great-grandson of Ivor Jones, both former Welsh internationals.

In October 2021, Neilson was arrested in the United Kingdom for fraud and money-laundering offences. It is alleged that Neilson defrauded investors out of $6million. Neilson is currently awaiting extradition to the United States where he is to face prosecution.

== Career statistics ==
As of 10 February 2015

Appearances and goals by club, season and competition
Club	Season	League			FA Cup		League Cup		Other		Total	
Club	Season	Division	Apps	Goals	Apps	Goals	Apps	Goals	Apps	Goals	Apps	Goals
Hertford Town	2005–06	Isthmian Second Division	11	0	0	0	–	–	4^{[A]}	1	15	1
Hertford Town	2006–07	Spartan South Midlands Premier Division	15	4	1	0	–	–	8^{[B]}	5	24	9
Hertford Town	Total		26	4	1	0	–	–	12	6	39	10
Ware	2006–07	Isthmian First Division North	20	9	–	–	–	–	2	2	22	11
Ware	2007–08	Isthmian First Division North	31	18	4	2	–	–	5	3	40	23
Ware	Total		51	27	4	2	–	–	7	5	62	34
Cambridge City	2007–08	Conference South	6	2	0	0	–	–	1^{[C]}	1	7	3
Cambridge City	2008–09	Southern Premier Division	40	11	3	1	–	–	6^{[D]}	1	49	13
Cambridge City	2009–10	Southern Premier Division	2	0	0	0	–	–	0	0	2	0
Cambridge City	Total		48	13	3	1	–	–	7	2	58	16
Bradford City	2009–10	League Two	23	1	1	0	0	0	4^{[E]}	1	28	2
Bradford City	2010–11	League Two	1	0	0	0	1	0	0	0	2	0
Bradford City	Total		24	1	1	0	1	0	4	1	30	2
Cambridge United (loan)	2009–10	Conference Premier	14	3	0	0	–	–	0	0	14	3
Crawley Town	2010–11	Conference Premier	27	5	4	1	–	–	0	0	31	6
Crawley Town	2011–12	League Two	30	3	3	0	1	0	1	0	35	3
Crawley Town	2012–13	League Two	0	0	0	0	0	0	1	1	1	1
Crawley Town	Total		57	8	7	1	1	0	2	1	67	10
Grimsby Town (loan)	2012–13	Conference Premier	10	1	0	0	–	–	0	0	10	1
Luton Town	2012–13	Conference Premier	8	1	0	0	–	–	0	0	8	1
Grimsby Town	2013–14	Conference Premier	34	6	4	0	–	–	2 (Note: Appearances in Conference play-offs)	0	40	6
Grimsby Town	2014–15	Conference Premier	20	5	1	0	–	–	0	0	21	5
Grimsby Town	Total		54	11	5	0	0	0	2	0	61	11
Career total			292	69	21	4	2	0	34	15	349	88

A. In the 2005–06 season, Neilson played four games and scored one goal in the Isthmian League Associate Members Cup for Hertford Town.
B. In the 2006–07 season, Neilson played one game in each of Spartans South Midland Challenge Trophy, Spartans South Midland Premier Division Cup, FA Vase and Hertfordshire Charity Cup, played two games and scored one goal in the Hertfordshire Senior Cup, played one game and scored one goal in the South Midland League Cup and played one game and scored three goals in the East Anglian Cup all for Hertford Town.
C. In the 2007–08 season, Neilson played one game and scored one goal in the Cambridge Invitational Cup for Cambridge City.
D. In the 2008–09 season, Neilson played four games in the FA Trophy and played two games and scored one goal in the Cambridge Invitational Cup for Cambridge City.
E. In the 2009–10 season, Neilson played four games and scored one goal in the Football League Trophy for Bradford City.

== Honours ==
Cambridge City

- Cambridge Invitational Cup: 2008, 2009
