= Michael Malcolm =

English footballer (born 1985)

Personal information
- Date of birth: 13 October 1985 (age 41)
- Place of birth: Harrow, London, England
- Positions: Striker; winger

Youth career
- 199?–1999: Wycombe Wanderers
- 1999–2005: Tottenham Hotspur

Senior career*
Years	Team	Apps	(Gls)
2005–2007	Stockport County	41	(5)
2007	Kettering Town	6	(1)
2007–2008	Rushden & Diamonds	9	(2)
2008–2009	Weymouth	37	(9)
2008–2009	→ Crawley Town (loan)	25	(4)
2009–2010	Crawley Town	21	(3)
2010	→ Hayes & Yeading (loan)	15	(1)
2010–2011	Farnborough	28	(6)
2011–2012	Lewes	28	(11)
2012–2013	Bromley	28	(4)
2013	Whitehawk	20	(9)
2013–2014	Maidenhead United	7	(1)
2014	Wealdstone	26	(9)
2014	Whitehawk	1	(0)
2015	St Albans City	3	(3)
2015	Hayes & Yeading		
2016	Cray Wanderers	1	(0)
- * Club domestic league appearances and goals as of 12:25, 27 February 2016 (UTC)

Michael Duhaney Malcolm (born 13 October 1985) is an English footballer who played in the Football League for Stockport County.

== Youth career ==
Malcolm joined Wycombe Wanderers as a schoolboy, but in March 2000, aged 14, was signed by Tottenham Hotspur for an initial fee of £10,000, progressing to be a trainee at Tottenham.

== Senior career ==
=== Stockport County ===
On failing to make the grade joined Stockport County in July 2005. His league debut came on 6 August 2005 when he came on as a late substitute for Keith Briggs in a 2–2 draw at home to Mansfield Town. Malcolm was due to have a trial with Werder Bremen with a view to a permanent move, but Bremen decided to pull the plug. He was released by Stockport in May 2007 after making 41 league appearances.

=== Kettering ===
Malcolm signed for Conference North side Kettering Town in August 2007. He made his debut in the 2007–08 season opener at Stalybridge Celtic.

=== Rushden and Diamonds ===
In September 2007 he moved to Conference National side Rushden & Diamonds. After a promising home debut, Malcolm opened his account at Rushden by scoring what would prove to be the winner away at Weymouth after coming on as a second-half substitute. He joined Weymouth on non-contract terms on 4 January 2008.

=== Crawley Town ===
He re-signed for Crawley Town on 1 July 2010 after he was earlier unable to agree a new contract. He went out on loan to Hayes & Yeading in August 2010.

=== Farnborough ===
On 14 December 2010 Crawley Town announced that his contract had been cancelled. Later that month he signed for Farnborough.

=== Lewes ===
In July 2011 Malcolm signed for Lewes in the Isthmian League Premier Division.

=== Bromley ===
On 3 February, he signed for Conference South side Bromley. He scored Bromley's equaliser in their 1–1 away draw with Thurrock on his debut on 14 February 2012. Bromley announced on 4 January 2013 that Malcolm was leaving the club with immediate effect, by mutual agreement.

=== Whitehawk ===
In July 2013, Malcolm signed for Ryman Premier side Whitehawk.

=== Maidenhead United ===
Malcolm signed for Conference South side Maidenhead United in July 2013 on a free transfer.

=== Wealdstone ===
On 25 January, Malcolm scored a deft header to score his first goal for Wealdstone after joining.

=== Second spell at Whitehawk ===
For the 2014/15 season, Malcolm rejoined Whitehawk, but only made one appearance for the team.

=== St Alban's City ===
In 2015, Malcolm joined National League South side St Alban's City, going on to make 16 appearances, scoring 4 goals.

=== Cambridge City ===
In September 2015, Malcolm signed for Southern League side Cambridge City. He went on to make 19 appearances for the side, scoring 9 goals in total.

=== Staines Town ===
In December 2015, Malcolm left Cambridge after finding it hard to travel to the games and subsequently joined Southern League Premier Division side Staines Town.

=== Cray Wanderers ===
Later in the same season, Malcolm moved to Northamptonshire club Cray Wanderers for a short period, making one appearance.

=== Hayes and Yeading ===
Malcolm saw off the rest of the 2015/16 season at Southern League side Hayes and Yeading United, making one appearance.

=== Chalfont St Peter ===
Malcolm joined fellow Southern League side Chalfont St Peter, making three cup appearances for the Buckinghamshire side.

=== Barton Rovers ===
In November 2016, Malcolm signed for Barton Rovers. He made 24 appearances in all competitions, scoring 4 goals in the process.

=== Hanwell Town ===
For the 2017/18 season, Malcolm signed for Hanwell Town.
