= Michel Kuipers =

Dutch retired footballer (born 1974)

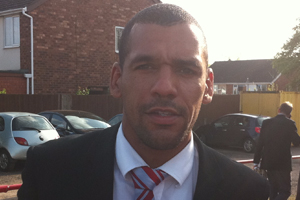

Personal information
- Full name: Michel Kuipers
- Date of birth: 26 June 1974 (age 52)
- Place of birth: Amsterdam, Netherlands
- Height: 6 ft 2 in (1.88 m)
- Position: Goalkeeper

Youth career
- Blauw-Wit Amsterdam

Senior career*
| Years | Team | Apps | (Gls) |
| ?–1999 | SDW | ? | (?) |
| 1999–2000 | Bristol Rovers | 1 | (0) |
| 2000 | → Chester City (loan) | 0 | (0) |
| 2000–2010 | Brighton & Hove Albion | 247 | (0) |
| 2003 | → Hull City (loan) | 3 | (0) |
| 2005 | → Boston United (loan) | 4 | (0) |
| 2006 | → Boston United (loan) | 11 | (0) |
| 2010–2013 | Crawley Town | 41 | (0) |
| 2013 | Barnet | 0 | (0) |
| Total | | 307 | (0) |
- * Club domestic league appearances and goals

Michel Kuipers (born 26 June 1974) is a Dutch retired footballer who played as a goalkeeper. Prior to football he served with the Dutch Marine Corps. He became a football agent after finishing his playing career.

== Life and career ==
Born in Amsterdam, Kuipers started his footballing career with Sterk Door Wilskracht (SDW), before moving to England in 1999 to join Bristol Rovers, where he spent 16 months.

In June 2000 he joined Brighton & Hove Albion on a free transfer, and quickly established himself as number one and became a firm fans' favourite because of his quick reactions, shot-stopping abilities and outgoing style. Kuipers suffered several career-threatening injuries during his time at Withdean, being injured in a car crash in 2003, and a severe shoulder injury in 2005.

Kuipers twice left the club on loan during his time at Brighton. He joined Hull City on loan during the 2003–04 season (before his return to Albion and subsequent car crash) and joined Boston United on loan during the 2005–06 season, to regain match fitness after recovering from his shoulder injury. In 2008, he played a big part in Brighton's upset victory against Manchester City in the League Cup, saving Michael Ball's effort in the penalty shoot-out. The following month he saved another decisive penalty in a shoot-out; this time from Leyton Orient's Luke Ashworth in the Football League Trophy.

In the 2007/08 season he was ever present in the goal playing all 46 league matches. This good form led to a new two-year contract that expired in June 2010. On 19 May 2010, he signed for fellow Sussex club Crawley Town. Kuipers' career with Crawley did not start well, being sent off twice during the first month of the season against Grimsby Town and Forest Green Rovers. He started in Crawley's match against Manchester United F.C. On 25 January 2013, his contract at Crawley was terminated by mutual consent.

On 28 March 2013, Kuipers signed a short-term deal with Barnet until the end of the season. He featured on the bench for all the remaining games that season as cover for first choice keeper Graham Stack. He was released at the end of the season.

== Honours ==
Brighton & Hove Albion

- Football League Second Division: 2001–02; play-offs: 2004
- Football League Third Division: 2000–01
