= 2010–11 Aldershot Town F.C. season =

Aldershot Town F.C.
2010–11 season
- Chairman: Kris Machala
- Manager: Kevin Dillon (until 10 January); Dean Holdsworth (from 11 January)
- Stadium: Recreation Ground
- Football League Two: 14th
- FA Cup: Second Round (eliminated by Dover Athletic)
- Football League Cup: First Round (eliminated by Watford)
- Football League Trophy: Second Round (eliminated by Bristol Rovers)
- Top goalscorer: League: Luke Guttridge - 8 All: Luke Guttridge - 8
- Highest home attendance: 3722 (vs. Wycombe Wanderers 18 September 2010)
- Lowest home attendance: 1847 (vs. Lincoln City 15 February 2011)
- Average home league attendance: 2488
Home colours	Away colours

The 2010–11 season is the 19th year of football played by Aldershot Town F.C. and their 3rd season back in the Football League.

== Season summary ==
Pre-season: The squad underwent a considerable reshuffle during the summer, with several key players from Aldershot's successful 2009–10 season leaving to join more prestigious clubs. These included Scott Donnelly to Swansea City and winger Kirk Hudson to League One side Brentford. Manager Kevin Dillon brought in a total of 11 new signings to the club, most notably experienced midfielder Glen Little from Sheffield United and Northampton Town's Luke Guttridge. On the pitch, Aldershot had several promising results in pre-season friendlies, including wins over Championship side Bristol City and League One Colchester. Confidence was high that the club could at least match the previous season's 6th-placed finish, Dillon believing that the new squad could be more competitive in the division.

August: The season started brightly as the Shots went unbeaten in the league throughout August. A goalless draw away at Accrington was followed a week later by a 1–0 home victory over Southend, Marvin Morgan grabbing the winner with 9 minutes remaining. Consecutive 1–1 draws followed away to Shrewsbury and at home to Stevenage, Morgan missing a late penalty in the latter game to deny the Shots all three points. The team also progressed to the second round of the League Trophy, winning 2–0 at home to Oxford United with goals from Danny Hylton and Damian Spencer. The Shots had a less impressive League Cup run, as despite what Dillon saw as a good performance, the team were easily beaten by Watford three goals to nil in the first round.

September: Aldershot continued their early unbeaten run with a third consecutive 1–1 draw at home to Northampton, though the Shots needed a Ben Harding volley in the 5th minute of injury time to salvage a point. The next game - away to promotion-chasing Port Vale - promised to be a tough test, and this was proved right as the club suffered its first loss of the season, Gary Roberts scoring the only goal of the game. On 16 September the management brought in winger Marlon Jackson on loan from Bristol City, a player who assistant manager Gary Owers believed would help the team in the attacking third. Wycombe were the next visitors to the Recreation Ground, which meant a return for former Shots' boss Gary Waddock, who led the club to the Football Conference championship in the 2007–08 season. The match failed to live up to expectations, ending in a dull goalless draw. This fifth low-scoring draw of the season encouraged fears that the side were not good enough up front, and were not converting the few chances being presented to them. The squad responded by taking a 2–0 lead away to Stockport in their next game, only to throw it away in the final minutes to draw yet again. A win did come before the end of the month, however, Morgan again netting in the final ten minutes to snatch all three points away to Torquay.

October: The month started poorly as a 2–0 home reverse against Cheltenham Town was followed days later by the team's elimination from another cup competition, this time losing 1–0 away to Bristol Rovers in the League Trophy. The Shots picked up in form mid-October and recorded their first back-to-back wins of the season against Oxford and Morecambe, with Morgan again on the scoresheet in both fixtures. The results lifted Aldershot into the League Two playoff places for the first and only time in the season. The next game - away to Crewe - would be a landmark for Aldershot Town captain Anthony Charles, the defender picking up his 200th appearance for the club. The match went poorly for Charles as the team lost 3–1, a result which was followed a week later by another defeat by the same scoreline at home to Bury. Both striker Morgan and manager Dillon were sent off, the latter for complaining about the performance of the match officials.

November: Despite manager Dillon believing his side deserved all three points, the Shots were again held to a 2–2 draw away to Hereford in their first game of the month, Jermaine McGlashan picking up his first goal for the club. The FA Cup first round had drawn Aldershot away to League One side Brentford, and the side performed admirably against higher league opposition to earn a replay. The 11 November marked Dillon's first full year in charge of the club, and in an interview he told the media he was pleased with the progression made during his tenure. The side suffered a 2–0 defeat away to Macclesfield before Brentford travelled to Aldershot for the FA Cup replay. In front of an above-average crowd of 3627, Wade Small got the only goal of the game to send the Shots into a second round tie away to Conference South side Dover Athletic. The club continued to struggle in the league, a 2–0 home defeat against table-topping Chesterfield prompted Dillon to bemoan the team's shooting as "terrible" and was quickly followed by the signing of free agent Wesley Ngo Baheng on a short-term contract. The Shots' striking improved in the midweek away game at Burton, Small continuing his good run of form with two more goals. Baheng made his debut for Aldershot in the FA Cup game against Dover, but failed to make an impact as the Shots went down to a disappointing 2–0 defeat against opposition two levels below them on the league pyramid, leaving manager Dillon perplexed.

December: Aldershot only completed one competitive game throughout the month, as heavy snow affected many league fixtures. A missed penalty by Wade Small meant the Shots left Rotherham empty-handed, a single goal from Adam Le Fondre enough to secure all three points for the Millers.

January: The Shots continued their above-average away form with a 2–1 win away at Barnet, but a further home defeat, this time 2–1 at home to relegation-threatened Hereford, caused supporters to voice their displeasure by booing the players off the pitch. Dillon responded by urging fans to be "realistic", while goalkeeper Jamie Young called for fans to get behind the team. The club's woes were compounded by striker Marvin Morgan sparking controversy over his comments on social networking site Twitter, resulting in the player being transfer-listed and quickly moved out on loan to Dagenham & Redbridge. A fourth straight home reverse to Oxford followed, and proved to be Dillon's last game as manager, as he and assistant Gary Owers left by mutual consent on 10 January, the club citing the team's poor league performance as a major contributing factor in the decision. A successor was not long in arriving, as the club officially named Newport County's Dean Holdsworth as new Aldershot manager just two days later. Holdsworth wasted no time making his mark on the team, bringing in forwards Peter Vincenti, Tim Sills, and Alex Rodman - as well as defender Simon Grand on loan from Fleetwood - before the end of the month. There were also players leaving the club during this period of transition, with both Glen Little and Wesley Ngo Baheng being released, whilst Anthony Straker and Damian Spencer were sent out on loan. Holdsworth's first game in charge resulted in a creditable 1–1 draw away to high-flying Bury, and he also improved on Aldershot's poor home form; Winning his first game at The Rec 1–0 against Bradford City, whilst a last-minute Luke Guttridge free-kick gave the Shots a second consecutive home win 3–2 against Crewe. The final game of the month saw Holdsworth's first defeat as Aldershot manager, 2–1 at Gillingham, though positives were taken from Alex Rodman's debut goal for the club.

February: The new manager continued attempting to strengthen the squad throughout February, with loan signings Albert Jarrett and Luke Medley from Lincoln and Mansfield respectively, though neither had a large impact on the team with only a handful of appearances between them. Holdsworth also signed former Shots goalkeeper Mikhael Jaimez-Ruiz, who made 62 appearances in a previous spell at the club. On the pitch, Aldershot went on a run of five consecutive draws, the first away to league leaders Chesterfield who required a later equaliser to rescue a point. An away stalemate at Morecambe was followed by consecutive home draws against Macclesfield and Lincoln. After a further draw against Northampton the Shots were finally beaten by a strong Port Vale side pushing for promotion, though the result could have been different if Anthony Charles hadn't missed a penalty. Aldershot ended the month in 18th position in the league, 8 points clear of the relegation zone.

March: Dean Holdsworth's men went unbeaten throughout March to virtually ensure the club's survival in League Two. Draws at home to Gillingham and away to Wycombe were followed by Aldershot's first win for nine games, a 1–0 home victory over Torquay, Luke Guttridge with the winner. The Shots pushed on from this positive result, recording three straight wins against teams in poor form, away to Cheltenham and at home to Barnet and Stockport. This run lifted the club to 14th in the table and a comfortable 17 points off the relegation zone. The upturn in form prompted speculation that the team could mount a charge for the playoffs, and though the club could only draw in their final game of the month at home to Accrington, Aldershot were left only 7 points behind 7th placed Rotherham. March also saw defender Jamie Vincent released from the club after not featuring in Holdsworth's first team plans, as well as a first team opportunity for youth team winger Adam Mekki.

April: The shots continued their unbeaten run into the first half of April, with a goalless away draw at Southend being followed by a convincing 3–0 home success over Shrewsbury, a team in good form chasing an automatic promotion place. A similarly impressive result followed as the Shots got a creditable draw away to Stevenage, Alex Rodman with two well-taken goals. The team's unbeaten run finally came to an end at home to Burton - the Shots going down 2–1 to suffer their first defeat in ten league games - and it seemed that the teams' minds were already on their holiday plans as they suffered a consecutive 2–1 defeat away to Bradford. The players stopped the rot in the penultimate game of the season, but still threw away a two-goal lead to draw with Rotherham. In the final league game of the season, Aldershot won 3–0 in Lincoln, relegated Lincoln. Luke Guttridge scored 2 goals and ended as the club's top scorer. The club followed up the previous month's signing of Adam Mekki by handing professional contracts to youth players Doug Bergqvist and Henrik Breimyr.

== Squad ==
Note: Flags indicate national team as defined under FIFA eligibility rules; some limited exceptions apply. Players may hold more than one non-FIFA nationality.

No.	Pos.	Nation	Player
1	GK	ENG	Jamie Young
2	DF	ENG	Ben Herd
3	DF	ENG	Jamie Vincent
4	MF	ENG	Luke Guttridge
5	DF	WAL	Darren Jones
6	DF	ENG	Anthony Charles
7	MF	ENG	Glen Little
8	MF	ENG	Ben Harding
9	FW	ENG	Damian Spencer
10	FW	ENG	Marvin Morgan
11	DF	GRN	Anthony Straker
12	FW	ENG	Danny Hylton
14	MF	SCO	Manny Panther
15	DF	WAL	Aaron Morris
16	DF	ENG	Clayton Fortune
17	MF	ENG	Jermaine McGlashan

No.	Pos.	Nation	Player
18	MF	ENG	Jack Randall
19	FW	ENG	Reece Connolly
20	FW	ENG	Wade Small
21	MF	ENG	John Halls
23	FW	ENG	Peter Vincenti
24	MF	ENG	Marlon Jackson (on loan from Bristol City)
24	DF	SWE	Doug Bergqvist
25	FW	ENG	Tim Sills
26	GK	VEN	Mikhael Jaimez-Ruiz
27	FW	FRA	Wesley Ngo Baheng
33	FW	ENG	Alex Rodman
35	MF	ENG	Adam Mekki
37	DF	ENG	Simon Grand (on loan from Fleetwood Town)
?	MF	SLE	Albert Jarrett (on loan from Lincoln City)
?	FW	ENG	Luke Medley (on loan from Mansfield Town)
?	FW	ENG	Liam Henderson (on loan from Watford)

- Note: Players listed in italics left the club before the end of the season.
- Note: Unused youth team substitutes not listed

== Transfers ==
=== In ===
Pos	Player	From	Fee	Date
DF	(Wales) Darren Jones	(England) Hereford United	Signed	21 Jun 2010
MF	(England) Glen Little	(England) Sheffield United	Free	1 Jul 2010
MF	(England) Luke Guttridge	(England) Northampton Town	Free	2 Jul 2010
DF	(England) Jamie Vincent	(England) Walsall	Free	2 Jul 2010
MF	(Scotland) Manny Panther	(England) Exeter City	Free	9 Jul 2010
FW	(England) Damian Spencer	(England) Kettering Town	Free	15 Jul 2010
DF	(Wales) Aaron Morris	(Wales) Cardiff City	Free	15 Jul 2010
MF	(England) Jack Randall	(England) Crystal Palace	Signed	15 Jul 2010
FW	(England) Wade Small	(England) Chesterfield	Free	30 Jul 2010
MF	(England) Jermaine McGlashan	(England) Ashford Town	Free	22 Jul 2010
DF	(England) Clayton Fortune	Unattached	Free	30 Jul 2010
FW	(England) Wesley Ngo Baheng	Unattached	Free	26 Nov 2010
FW	(England) Peter Vincenti	(England) Stevenage	Free	14 Jan 2011
FW	(England) Tim Sills	(England) Stevenage	Free	17 Jan 2011
GK	(Venezuela) Mikhael Jaimez-Ruiz	(Venezuela) Yaracuyanos	Free	14 Feb 2011

=== Out ===
Pos	Player	To	Fee	Date
DF	(England) Aaron Brown	(England) Leyton Orient	Signed	26 May 2010
MF	(England) Scott Donnelly	(Wales) Swansea City	Signed	23 Jun 2010
MF	(England) Kirk Hudson	(England) Brentford	Free	28 Jun 2010
DF	(England) Andy Sandell	(England) Wycombe Wanderers	Free	30 Jun 2010
MF	(England) Lewis Chalmers	(England) Macclesfield Town	Free	30 Jun 2010
DF	(England) Dave Winfield	(England) Wycombe Wanderers	Free	15 Jul 2010
MF	(England) Louie Soares	(England) Southend United	Signed	23 Jul 2010
DF	(England) Chris Blackburn	(Wales) Wrexham	Free	1 Aug 2010
FW	(Turkey) Omer Riza	(England) Histon	Signed	1 Aug 2010
MF	(England) Glen Little	(Wales) Wrexham	Jan 2011	
FW	(France) Wesley Ngo Baheng	(England) Hereford United	Signed	28 Jan 2011
DF	(England) Jamie Vincent	(England) Didcot Town	20 Mar 2011	

=== Loans ===
Loans in
Pos	Player	From	Start date	End date
MF	(England) Marlon Jackson	(England) Bristol City	16 Sep 2010	21 Nov 2010
FW	(England) Liam Henderson	(England) Watford	6 Jan 2011	14 Feb 2011
DF	(England) Simon Grand	(England) Fleetwood Town	20 Jan 2011	End of season
MF	(Sierra Leone) Albert Jarrett	(England) Lincoln City	18 Feb 2011	18 Mar 2011
FW	(England) Luke Medley	(England) Mansfield Town	28 Feb 2011	28 Mar 2011

Loans out
Pos	Player	To	Start date	End date
FW	(England) Reece Connolly	(England) Didcot Town	24 Oct 2010	Nov 2010
GK	(England) Jordan Clement	(England) Blackfield & Langley	24 Oct 2010	Nov 2010
MF	(England) Adam Mekki	(England) Oxford City	2 Jan 2011	Feb 2011
DF	(Sweden) Doug Bergqvist	(England) Thatcham Town	2 Jan 2011	Feb 2011
FW	(England) Marvin Morgan	(England) Dagenham & Redbridge	7 Jan 2011	End of season
FW	(England) Damian Spencer	(England) Eastbourne Borough	28 Jan 2011	Feb 2011
DF	(Grenada) Anthony Straker	(England) Wycombe Wanderers	31 Jan 2011	Mar 2011
FW	(England) Reece Connolly	(England) Dorchester Town	21 Feb 2011	End of season

== Results ==
=== League Two ===
==== Results summary ====
Overall								Home						Away					
Pld	W	D	L	GF	GA	GD	Pts	W	D	L	GF	GA	GD	W	D	L	GF	GA	GD
46	14	19	13	54	54	0	61	8	8	7	26	26	0	6	11	6	28	28	0

Last updated: 25 April 2011.
Source: BBC Sport

==== Results by round ====
Round	1	2	3	4	5	6	7	8	9	10	11	12	13	14	15	16	17	18	19	20	21	22	23	24	25	26	27	28	29	30	31	32	33	34	35	36	37	38	39	40	41	42	43	44	45	46
Ground	A	H	A	H	H	A	H	A	A	H	A	H	A	H	A	A	H	A	A	A	H	H	A	H	H	A	A	A	H	H	A	A	H	A	H	A	H	H	H	A	H	A	H	A	H	A
Result	D	W	D	D	D	L	D	D	W	L	W	W	L	L	D	L	L	W	L	W	L	L	D	W	W	L	D	D	D	D	D	L	D	D	W	W	W	W	D	D	W	D	L	L	D	W
Position	16	9	8	9	10	13	14	18	10	15	10	7	9	11	12	14	16	12	18	16	20	20	18	16	12	14	18	16	16	16	16	19	18	18	15	14	14	14	13	13	12	12	14	14	14	14

Updated to match(es) played on 30 April 2011. Source: BBC Sport
A = Away; H = Home; W = Win; D = Draw; L = Loss

==== Matches ====
7 August 2010 1	Accrington Stanley	0–0	Aldershot Town	Accrington
15:00 BST	Boulding (yellow card) 45'; Bennett (yellow card) 87'	(Report)	(yellow card) 44' Straker; (yellow card) 67' Jones	Stadium: Crown Ground; Attendance: 1624; Referee: Waugh

14 August 2010 2	Aldershot Town	1–0	Southend United	Aldershot
15:00 BST	Morgan 81'; Charles (yellow card) 63'; Herd (yellow card) 90'	(Report)	(yellow card) 50' Prosser; (yellow card) 77' Grant; (yellow card) 88' Easton	Stadium: Recreation Ground; Attendance: 3011; Referee: Horwood

21 August 2010 3	Shrewsbury Town	1–1	Aldershot Town	Shrewsbury
15:00 BST	Sharps 29'; Harrold (yellow card) 76', 90' (yellow-red card)	(Report)	31' Charles	Stadium: Greenhous Meadow; Attendance: 5353; Referee: Miller

28 August 2010 4	Aldershot Town	1–1	Stevenage	Aldershot
15:00 BST	Spencer 63'; Morgan (yellow card) 45'	(Report)	50' Beardsley; (yellow card) 78' Ashton	Stadium: Recreation Ground; Attendance: 2525; Referee: Halsey

4 September 2010 5	Aldershot Town	1–1	Northampton Town	Aldershot
15:00 BST	Harding 90'; Panther (yellow card) 14'	(Report)	34' McKay; (yellow card) 10' Johnson; (yellow card) 45' Beckwith	Stadium: Recreation Ground; Attendance: 2739; Referee: Scott

11 September 2010 6	Port Vale	1–0	Aldershot Town	Stoke-on-Trent
15:00 BST	Roberts 10'; Roberts (yellow card) 61'; Collins (yellow card) 72'	(Report)	(yellow card) 49' Straker; (yellow card) 89' Vincent	Stadium: Vale Park; Attendance: 5360; Referee: Mark Brown

18 September 2010 7	Aldershot Town	0–0	Wycombe Wanderers	Aldershot
15:00 BST	Halls (yellow card) 59'	(Report)	(yellow card) 56' Foster; (yellow card) 65' Davies; (yellow card) 76' Betsy	Stadium: Recreation Ground; Attendance: 3722; Referee: Sheldrake

25 September 2010 8	Stockport County	2–2	Aldershot Town	Stockport
15:00 BST	Turnbull 73', 82'; Griffin (yellow card) 28'; Assoumani (yellow card) 90'	(Report)	27' Straker; 38' Morgan; (yellow card) 70' Hylton; (yellow card) 88' Charles	Stadium: Edgeley Park; Attendance: 4231; Referee: Ilderton

28 September 2010 9	Torquay United	0–1	Aldershot Town	Torquay
19:45 BST	Robertson (yellow card) 35'	(Report)	86' Morgan	Stadium: Plainmoor; Attendance: 2167; Referee: East

2 October 2010 10	Aldershot Town	0–2	Cheltenham Town	Aldershot
15:00 BST	Charles (yellow card) 75'	(Report)	13' Andrew; 62' Goulding; (yellow card) 35' Pook; (yellow card) 60' Brown	Stadium: Recreation Ground; Attendance: 2509; Referee: Langford

9 October 2010 11	Oxford United	0–1	Aldershot Town	Oxford
15:00 BST	Constable (yellow card) 76'; Midson (yellow card) 90'	(Report)	58' Morgan; (yellow card) 45' Morgan; (yellow card) 49' Jackson; (yellow card) 7', 43' (yellow-red card) Vincent	Stadium: Kassam Stadium; Attendance: 7808; Referee: Bates

16 October 2010 12	Aldershot Town	2–1	Morecambe	Aldershot
15:00 BST	Spencer 27'; Morgan 36'	(Report)	66' Brown; (yellow card) 70' Brown	Stadium: Recreation Ground; Attendance: 2308; Referee: Wright

23 October 2010 13	Crewe Alexandra	3–1	Aldershot Town	Crewe
15:00 BST	Moore 43'; Grant 44'; Westwood 58'; Taylor (yellow card) 90'	(Report)	52' Straker; (yellow card) 83' McGlashan	Stadium: Alexandra Stadium; Attendance: 4164; Referee: Haines

30 October 2010 14	Aldershot Town	1–3	Bury	Aldershot
15:00 BST	Little 11'; Charles (yellow card) 23'; Guttridge (yellow card) 64'; Hylton (yellow card) 90'; Jones (red card) 22'; Morgan (yellow card) 24', 68' (yellow-red card)	(Report)	44', 66' Jones; 77' Ajose; (yellow card) 16' Skarz; (yellow card) 64' Picken; (yellow card) 73' Mozika; (yellow card) 78' Haworth	Stadium: Recreation Ground; Attendance: 2526; Referee: Whitestone

2 November 2010 15	Hereford United	2–2	Aldershot Town	Hereford
15:00 GMT	Rose 25'; Colbeck 45'	(Report)	20' McGlashan; 87' Small	Stadium: Edgar Street; Attendance: 2126; Referee: Tierney

13 November 2010 16	Macclesfield Town	2–0	Aldershot Town	Macclesfield
15:00 GMT	Daniel 17'; Barnett 77'; Tremarco (yellow card) 33'; Barnett (yellow card) 50'	(Report)	(yellow card) 22' Morris	Stadium: Moss Rose; Attendance: 1519; Referee: Coote

20 November 2010 17	Aldershot Town	0–2	Chesterfield	Aldershot
15:00 GMT		(Report)	61' Davies; 63' Whitaker	Stadium: Recreation Ground; Attendance: 2479; Referee: Hegley

23 November 2010 18	Burton Albion	1–2	Aldershot Town	Burton upon Trent
19:45 GMT	Harrad 45'	(Report)	16', 26' Small; (yellow card) 47' Morgan; (yellow card) 66' Vincent; (yellow card) 67' Fortune; (yellow card) 90' McGlashan	Stadium: Pirelli Stadium; Attendance: 1904; Referee: Mathieson

11 December 2010 19	Rotherham United	1–0	Aldershot Town	Sheffield
15:00 GMT	Le Fondre 40'	(Report)	(yellow card) 45' Straker; (yellow card) 64', 88' (yellow-red card) Vincent	Stadium: Don Valley Stadium; Attendance: 2754; Referee: Sutton

1 January 2011 20	Barnet	1–2	Aldershot Town	London
15:00 GMT	McLeod 54'; Holmes (yellow card) 51'	(Report)	35' Harding; 41' Small; (yellow card) 75' Charles	Stadium: Underhill Stadium; Attendance: 1902; Referee: Graham

3 January 2011 21	Aldershot Town	1–2	Hereford United	Aldershot
15:00 GMT	Guttridge 90'; Small (yellow card) 43'; Morris (yellow card) 69'	(Report)	3' Fleetwood; 82' Colbeck; (yellow card) 37' McQuilkin; (yellow card) 39' Lunt	Stadium: Recreation Ground; Attendance: 2767; Referee: Ward

8 January 2011 22	Aldershot Town	1–2	Oxford United	Aldershot
15:00 GMT	Guttridge 76'; Guttridge (yellow card) 56'	(Report)	8' (o.g.) Charles; 85' Craddock; (yellow card) 49' Clist; (yellow card) 58' Worley	Stadium: Recreation Ground; Attendance: 3129; Referee: Langford

15 January 2011 23	Bury	1–1	Aldershot Town	Bury
15:00 GMT	Schumacher 71'; Picken (yellow card) 15'; Skarz (yellow card) 30'; Bennett (yellow card) 45'	(Report)	9' Guttridge; (yellow card) 41' Herd	Stadium: Gigg Lane; Attendance: 2537; Referee: D'Urso

18 January 2011 24	Aldershot Town	1–0	Bradford City	Aldershot
19:45 GMT	Charles 23'; Vincent (yellow card) 68'; Guttridge (yellow card) 83'	(Report)	(yellow card) 29' Threlfall	Stadium: Recreation Ground; Attendance: 2160; Referee: Woolmer

22 January 2011 25	Aldershot Town	3–2	Crewe Alexandra	Aldershot
15:00 GMT	Small 24'; Vincenti 63'; Guttridge 90'; Harding (yellow card) 57'; Herd (yellow card) 86'	(Report)	19' Shelley; 43' Donaldson; (yellow card) 73' Dugdale; (red card) 90' Taylor	Stadium: Recreation Ground; Attendance: 2613; Referee: Stroud

29 January 2011 26	Gillingham	2–1	Aldershot Town	Gillingham
15:00 GMT	McDonald 53', 90'; Nutter (yellow card) 55'	(Report)	90' Rodman; (yellow card) 41' Hylton; (yellow card) 44' Charles	Stadium: Priestfield Stadium; Attendance: 4810; Referee: Phil Gibbs

5 February 2011 27	Chesterfield	2–2	Aldershot Town	Chesterfield
15:00 GMT	Smalley 7', 84'; Allott (yellow card) 48'; Vidal (yellow card) 72'	(Report)	61', 79' Sills; (yellow card) 13' Herd; (yellow card) 29' Grand; (yellow card) 32' McGlashan	Stadium: B2net Stadium; Attendance: 5669; Referee: Taylor

8 February 2011 28	Morecambe	1–1	Aldershot Town	Morecambe
19:45 GMT	Holdsworth 51'; Holdsworth (yellow card) 64'	(Report)	74' Rodman	Stadium: Globe Arena; Attendance: 1703; Referee: Quinn

12 February 2011 29	Aldershot Town	0–0	Macclesfield Town	Aldershot
15:00 GMT	Panther (yellow card) 16'	(Report)	(yellow card) 24' Sinclair; (yellow card) 28' Draper	Stadium: Recreation Ground; Attendance: 2373; Referee: East

15 February 2011 30	Aldershot Town	2–2	Lincoln City	Aldershot
19:45 GMT	Charles 18' (pen.); Rodman 48'; Vincenti (yellow card) 20'; Jones (yellow card) 25'	(Report)	65' O'Keefe; 86' Grimes; (yellow card) 58' Fuseini	Stadium: Recreation Ground; Attendance: 1847; Referee: Phillips

19 February 2011 31	Northampton Town	1–1	Aldershot Town	Northampton
15:00 GMT	Tozer 18'; Johnson (yellow card) 85'; Harrad (red card) 82'	(Report)	78' Vincenti	Stadium: Sixfields Stadium; Attendance: 5011; Referee: Evans

26 February 2011 32	Aldershot Town	1–2	Port Vale	Aldershot
15:00 GMT	Vincenti 68'; Grand (yellow card) 24'; Hylton (yellow card) 90'	(Report)	26' McCombe; 51' M. Richards; (yellow card) 42' McCombe; (yellow card) 65' Tomlinson; (yellow card) 74' Geohaghon; (yellow card) 90' Collins	Stadium: Recreation Ground; Attendance: 2506; Referee: Williamson

1 March 2011 33	Aldershot Town	1–1	Gillingham	Aldershot
19:45 GMT	Hylton 77'	(Report)	82' Nutter	Stadium: Recreation Ground; Attendance: 2038; Referee: Russell

5 March 2011 34	Wycombe Wanderers	2–2	Aldershot Town	High Wycombe
15:00 GMT	Foster 44'; Betsy 48'; Johnson (yellow card) 29'; Westwood (yellow card) 47'	(Report)	26' Guttridge; 76' Halls; (yellow card) 37' Hylton; (yellow card) 56' Jones	Stadium: Adams Park; Attendance: 4421; Referee: Scott

8 March 2011 35	Aldershot Town	1–0	Torquay United	Aldershot
19:45 GMT	Guttridge 53'; Mekki (yellow card) 85'	(Report)	(yellow card) 26' Zebroski; (yellow card) 77' Halpin	Stadium: Recreation Ground; Attendance: 1939; Referee: Carl Berry

12 March 2011 36	Cheltenham Town	1–2	Aldershot Town	Cheltenham
15:00 GMT	Pook 83'; Pook (yellow card) 88'	(Report)	10' Charles; 55' Vincenti; (yellow card) 32' Halls; (yellow card) 78' Straker	Stadium: Abbey Business Stadium; Attendance: 2697; Referee: Wright

19 March 2011 37	Aldershot Town	1–0	Stockport County	Aldershot
15:00 GMT	Spencer 90'	(Report)	(yellow card) 60' Rose; (yellow card) 63', 67' (yellow-red card) Goodall	Stadium: Recreation Ground; Attendance: 2263; Referee: Rushton

22 March 2011 38	Aldershot Town	1–0	Barnet	Aldershot
19:45 GMT	Hylton 60'; McGlashan (yellow card) 72'; Herd (yellow card) 83'	(Report)	(yellow card) 90' Byrne; (yellow card) 52', 78' (yellow-red card) Parsons	Stadium: Recreation Ground; Attendance: 2420; Referee: Sarginson

26 March 2011 39	Aldershot Town	1–1	Accrington Stanley	Aldershot
15:00 GMT	Jones 52'; Vincenti (yellow card) 76'	(Report)	17' Boulding; (yellow card) 53' Hessey; (yellow card) 73' Jacobson; (yellow card) 80' Procter	Stadium: Recreation Ground; Attendance: 2555; Referee: Crossley

2 April 2011 40	Southend United	0–0	Aldershot Town	Southend-on-Sea
15:00 BST	Corr (yellow card) 72'; Grant (yellow card) 90'	(Report)	(yellow card) 66' Jones	Stadium: Roots Hall; Attendance: 5557; Referee: Lewis

9 April 2011 41	Aldershot Town	3–0	Shrewsbury Town	Aldershot
15:00 BST	Hylton; Herd 29'	(Report)	(yellow card) 67' Harrold; (yellow card) 75' Canavan	Stadium: Recreation Ground; Attendance: 2371; Referee: Naylor

16 April 2011 42	Stevenage	2–2	Aldershot Town	Stevenage
15:00 BST	Charles 9'; Foster 72'; Charles (yellow card) 7'; Roberts (yellow card) 78'	(Report)	43', 48' Rodman; (yellow card) 13' Hylton; (yellow card) 38' Halls; (yellow card) 76' Charles; (yellow card) 78' Spencer	Stadium: Broadhall Way; Attendance: 3031; Referee: Atkinson

23 April 2011 43	Aldershot Town	1–2	Burton Albion	Aldershot
15:00 BST	Spencer 26'; Guttridge (yellow card) 28'; Rodman (yellow card) 66'; Straker (yellow card) 82'; Jones (yellow card) 89'; Hylton (yellow card) 90'	(Report)	12' Webster; 74' Zola; (yellow card) 52' Penn	Stadium: Recreation Ground; Attendance: 2308; Referee: Ward

25 April 2011 44	Bradford City	2–1	Aldershot Town	Bradford
15:00 BST	Daley 4'; Syers 90'; Hunt (yellow card) 61'; Syers (yellow card) 85'	(Report)	43' Vincenti; (yellow card) 74' Charles; (yellow card) 76' Young; (yellow card) 88' Halls	Stadium: Valley Parade; Attendance: 10965; Referee: Mathieson

30 April 2011 45	Aldershot Town	2–2	Rotherham United	Aldershot
15:00 BST	Charles 5'; Vincenti 11'; Hylton (yellow card) 26'; Herd (yellow card) 37'; Charles (yellow card) 80'	(Report)	32', 55' Le Fondre; (yellow card) 86' Bradley	Stadium: Recreation Ground; Attendance: 2107; Referee: Evans

7 April 2011 46	Lincoln City	0-3	Aldershot Town	Lincoln
15:00 BST	Keltie (yellow card) 11'	(Report)	57' (pen.) Hylton; 69', 86' Guttridge; (yellow card) 40' McGlashan	Stadium: Sincil Bank; Attendance: 7932; Referee: Moss

=== FA Cup ===
6 November 2010 1	Brentford	1–1	Aldershot Town	London
15:00 GMT	MacDonald 20'; Weston (yellow card) 62'; Diagouraga (yellow card) 76'	(Report)	13' Small	Stadium: Griffin Park; Attendance: 4090; Referee: Booth

16 November 2010 1RR	Aldershot Town	1–0	Brentford	Aldershot
19:45 GMT	Small 8'; Harding (yellow card) 74'	(Report)	(yellow card) 59' Legge	Stadium: Recreation Ground; Attendance: 3627; Referee: Tanner

27 November 2010 2	Dover Athletic	2–0	Aldershot Town	River
15:00 GMT	Birchall	(Report)	(yellow card) 50' Straker; (yellow card) 88' Herd; (yellow card) 89' Hylton	Stadium: Crabble Athletic Ground; Attendance: 4123; Referee: Malone

=== League Cup ===
10 August 2010 1	Aldershot Town	0–3	Watford	Aldershot
19:45 BST		(Report)	14', 48' Graham; 45' Sordell	Stadium: Recreation Ground; Attendance: 3292; Referee: Woolmer

=== Football League Trophy ===
31 August 2010 1	Aldershot Town	2–0	Oxford United	Aldershot
19:45 BST	Hylton 17'; Spencer 58'; Fortune (yellow card) 80'	(Report)		Stadium: Recreation Ground; Attendance: 1607; Referee: Hooper

5 October 2010 2	Bristol Rovers	1–0	Aldershot Town	Bristol
19:45 BST	Hoskins 90'; Hoskins (yellow card) 90'	(Report)	(yellow card) 30' Morris; (yellow card) 80' Hylton	Stadium: Memorial Stadium; Attendance: 4050; Referee: Phil Gibbs

== Season statistics ==
=== Squad stats ===
No.	Pos	Nat	Player	Total		League Two		FA Cup		League Cup		FL Trophy	
No.	Pos	Nat	Player	Apps	Goals	Apps	Goals	Apps	Goals	Apps	Goals	Apps	Goals
1	GK	(England) ENG	Jamie Young	52	0	46	0	3	0	1	0	2	0
26	GK	(Venezuela) VEN	Mikhael Jaimez-Ruiz	0	0	0	0	0	0	0	0	0	0
2	DF	(England) ENG	Ben Herd	48	1	43	0	3	1	1	0	1	0
5	DF	(Wales) WAL	Darren Jones	47	1	43	1	3	0	0	0	1	0
6	DF	(England) ENG	Anthony Charles	44	5	41	5	1	0	1	0	1	0
11	DF	(Grenada) GRN	Anthony Straker	41	2	38	2	0	0	1	0	2	0
15	DF	(Wales) WAL	Aaron Morris	25	0	22	0	2	0	0	0	1	0
16	DF	(England) ENG	Clayton Fortune	11	0	7	0	1	0	1	0	2	0
24	DF	(Sweden) SWE	Doug Bergqvist	1	0	1	0	0	0	0	0	0	0
37	DF	(England) ENG	Simon Grand	6	0	6	0	0	0	0	0	0	0
4	MF	(England) ENG	Luke Guttridge	47	8	41	8	3	0	1	0	2	0
8	MF	(England) ENG	Ben Harding	40	2	35	2	2	0	1	0	2	0
14	MF	(Scotland) SCO	Manny Panther	26	0	23	0	1	0	1	0	1	0
17	MF	(England) ENG	Jermaine McGlashan	44	1	38	1	3	0	1	0	2	0
18	MF	(England) ENG	Jack Randall	1	0	1	0	0	0	0	0	0	0
21	MF	(England) ENG	John Halls	25	1	23	1	0	0	0	0	2	0
35	MF	(England) ENG	Adam Mekki	8	0	8	0	0	0	0	0	0	0
9	FW	(England) ENG	Damian Spencer	21	5	18	4	0	0	1	0	2	1
10	FW	(England) ENG	Marvin Morgan	22	5	19	5	2	0	1	0	0	0
12	FW	(England) ENG	Danny Hylton	39	6	33	5	3	0	1	0	2	1
19	FW	(England) ENG	Reece Connolly	5	0	5	0	0	0	0	0	0	0
20	FW	(England) ENG	Wade Small	35	7	29	5	3	2	1	0	2	0
23	FW	(England) ENG	Peter Vincenti	23	6	23	6	0	0	0	0	0	0
25	FW	(England) ENG	Tim Sills	19	1	19	1	0	0	0	0	0	0
33	FW	(England) ENG	Alex Rodman	14	5	14	5	0	0	0	0	0	0
Players who left the club before the end of the season
3	FW	(England) ENG	Jamie Vincent	28	1	24	1	3	0	1	0	0	0
24	MF	(England) ENG	Marlon Jackson	9	0	9	0	0	0	0	0	0	0
?	MF	(Sierra Leone) SLE	Albert Jarrett	2	0	2	0	0	0	0	0	0	0
7	FW	(England) ENG	Glen Little	21	1	19	1	2	0	0	0	0	0
27	FW	(France) FRA	Wesley Ngo Baheng	3	0	2	0	1	0	0	0	0	0
?	FW	(England) ENG	Luke Medley	4	0	4	0	0	0	0	0	0	0
?	FW	(England) ENG	Liam Henderson	1	0	1	0	0	0	0	0	0	0

- Note: Hampshire Senior Cup games and statistics not included.

=== Discipline ===
No.	Pos.	Name	Discipline	
No.	Pos.	Name	Yellow card	Red card
3	DF	(England) Jamie Vincent	5	2
5	DF	(Wales) Darren Jones	5	1
10	FW	(England) Marvin Morgan	4	1
6	DF	(England) Anthony Charles	10	0
12	FW	(England) Danny Hylton	9	0
2	DF	(England) Ben Herd	7	0
11	DF	(Grenada) Anthony Straker	6	0
17	MF	(England) Jermaine McGlashan	5	0
4	MF	(England) Luke Guttridge	4	0
21	MF	(England) John Halls	4	0
15	DF	(Wales) Aaron Morris	2	0
37	DF	(England) Simon Grand	2	0
8	MF	(England) Ben Harding	2	0
14	MF	(Scotland) Manny Panther	2	0
23	FW	(England) Peter Vincenti	2	0
16	DF	(England) Clayton Fortune	1	0
24	MF	(England) Marlon Jackson	1	0
35	MF	(England) Adam Mekki	1	0
20	FW	(England) Alex Rodman	1	0
20	FW	(England) Wade Small	1	0
9	FW	(England) Damian Spencer	1	0
1	GK	(England) Jamie Young	1	0

Statistics accurate as of match played 25 April 2011

== Awards ==
End of Season Awards	Winner
Supporters Player of the Season	Luke Guttridge
Shots Player Share Player of the Season	Darren Jones
Players' Player of the Season	Ben Herd
