= Anthony Straker =

English-Grenadian footballer (born 1988)

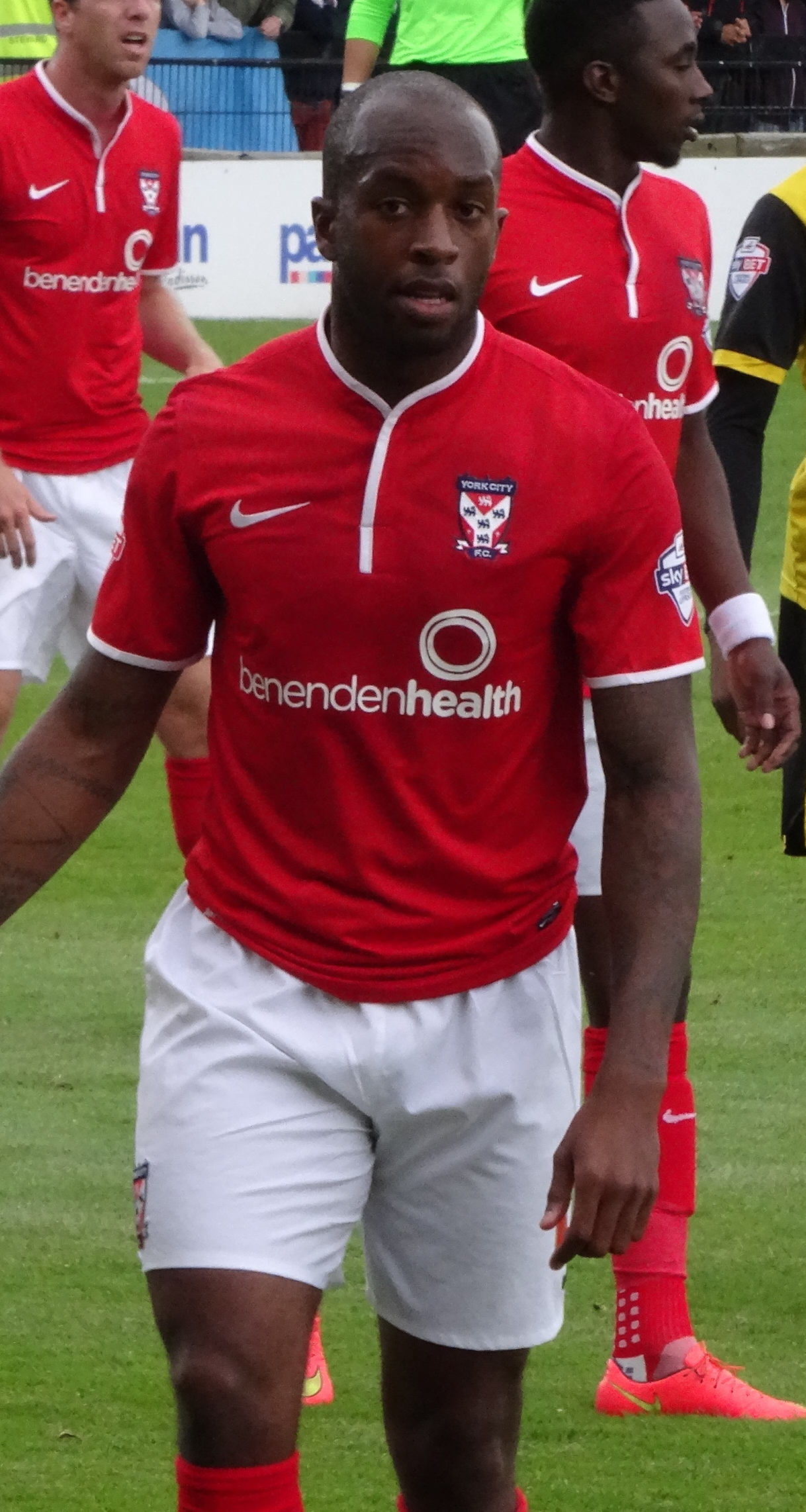
- Straker with York City in 2014

Personal information
- Full name: Anthony Othneal Straker
- Date of birth: 23 September 1988 (age 38)
- Place of birth: Ealing, England
- Height: 5 ft 9 in (1.75 m)
- Positions: Defender; midfielder

Youth career
- –2007: Crystal Palace

Senior career*
Years	Team	Apps	(Gls)
2007–2012	Aldershot Town	194	(6)
2011	→ Wycombe Wanderers (loan)	4	(0)
2012–2014	Southend United	67	(2)
2014–2016	York City	23	(0)
2015	→ Motherwell (loan)	12	(0)
2016	Grimsby Town	2	(0)
2016–2017	Aldershot Town	33	(0)
2017–2019	Bath City	77	(8)
2019–2021	Havant & Waterlooville	41	(1)
Total		453	(17)

International career^{‡}
2005–2006	England U18	2	(0)
2011–2015	Grenada	10	(1)
- * Club domestic league appearances and goals as of 12:01, 16 March 2022 (UTC) ‡ National team caps and goals as of 10:17, 22 September 2024 (UTC)

Anthony Othneal Straker (born 23 September 1988) is a former semi-professional footballer who played as a defender or midfielder. He has also been capped on ten occasions by the Grenada national football team.

== Club career ==
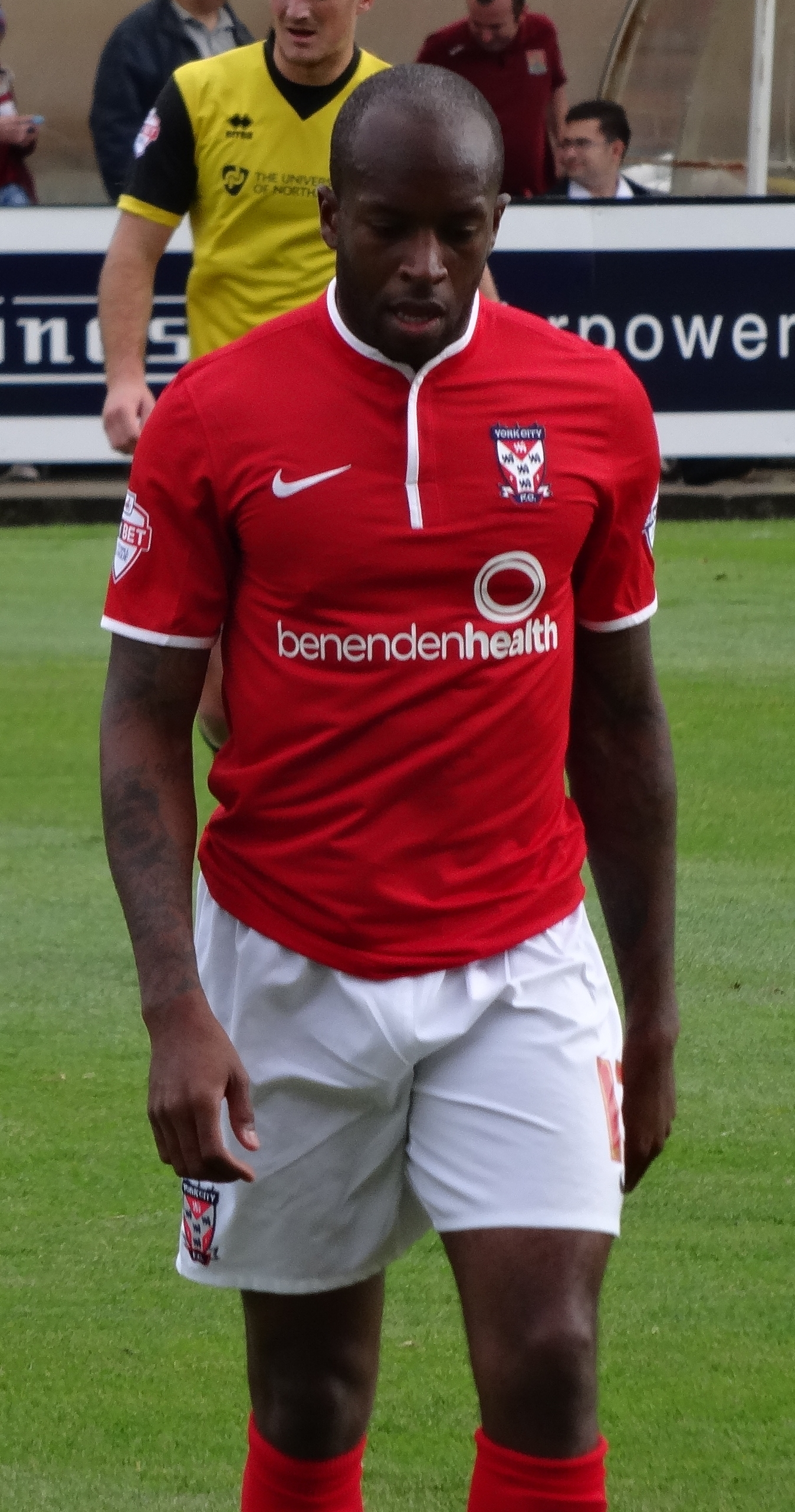
Straker playing for York City in 2014

Born in Ealing, London, Straker started his career in the youth system at Crystal Palace, and was a trainee with the club. He went on trial with League One club Yeovil Town in March 2007 before being released by Palace.

Straker signed a one-year contract with Conference Premier club Aldershot Town on 6 August 2007, after a successful pre-season trial. After impressing in the first half of the season, Straker signed a contract extension in February 2008, keeping him at Aldershot Town until June 2010. That season, he was a member of the team that won the Conference League Cup and the Conference Premier title. During the January transfer window of 2011, Straker completed a one-month loan deal with Wycombe Wanderers.

On 2 July 2012 Straker moved to Southend United, signing a two-year contract. Aldershot were entitled to a fee for his transfer as he was under the age of 23. This was agreed to be £17,500 plus add ons.

Straker signed for League Two club York City on 12 June 2014 on a two-year contract after rejecting a new deal with Southend. He made his debut in York's 1–1 away draw with Tranmere Rovers in the opening match of the 2014–15 season on 9 August 2014.

Having played infrequently for York under Russ Wilcox, Straker moved on loan to Scottish Premiership club Motherwell until the end of 2014–15 on 29 January 2015. He made his debut in a 1–1 draw at home to St Johnstone two days later. He made 13 appearances before returning to York. Straker left the club by mutual consent on 22 January 2016.

On 12 February 2016, Straker signed for National League club Grimsby Town on a contract until the end of 2015–16, after a successful trial. Straker was released when his contract expired at the end of the season.

On 21 June 2016, Straker returned to Aldershot Town after a four-year absence on a one-year contract.

On 20 May 2017, Straker dropped down a division by signing for National League South club Bath City, despite being offered a new contract by Aldershot.

On 14 May 2019, it was announced that Straker's contract had been mutually terminated, with the defender agreeing terms with newly relegated, Havant & Waterlooville.

== International career ==
Straker made his debut for the England national under-18 team in a 1–0 away defeat to Turkey in a friendly on 17 November 2005, and he was substituted for Chris Riley in the 77th minute. He gained one more cap, playing in a 2–1 home win over Slovenia in another friendly on 17 April 2006, being substituted for Adam Watts at half-time. In January 2008, Straker was called up to the Barbados national team for the upcoming CONCACAF first round qualifier for the 2010 FIFA World Cup against Dominica, though he did not play.

In May 2011, he was called up for the Grenadian national team for the upcoming CONCACAF Gold Cup. Straker played in two pre-tournament friendlies, including his debut in a 2–2 home draw with Antigua and Barbuda on 27 May 2011. He made his competitive debut for Grenada in their first match in the Gold Cup, a 4–0 loss to Jamaica at the Home Depot Center on 6 June 2011. Straker played in their two remaining group stage fixtures, a 7–1 defeat to Honduras at the FIU Stadium on 10 June 2011 and a 4–0 defeat to Guatemala at the Red Bull Arena on 13 June. He played in Grenada's three 2012 Caribbean Cup qualification second round matches, although they missed out on qualifying for the tournament after finishing in third place in their group on goal difference. He scored his first international goal with a 33rd-minute penalty kick in Grenada's 3–1 home defeat to Haiti in a 2018 FIFA World Cup qualifier on 4 September 2015.

== Style of play ==
Straker primarily plays as a left winger, having been converted from playing at left back during 2009–10.

== Career statistics ==
=== Club ===
As of match played 1 May 2019

Appearances and goals by club, season and competition
Club	Season	League			FA Cup		League Cup		Other		Total	
Club	Season	Division	Apps	Goals	Apps	Goals	Apps	Goals	Apps	Goals	Apps	Goals
Aldershot Town	2007–08	Conference Premier	43	0	3	0	—		10 (Note: Six appearances in FA Trophy, four appearances and one goal in Conference League Cup)	1	56	1
Aldershot Town	2008–09	League Two	32	0	3	0	0	0	0	0	35	0
Aldershot Town	2009–10	League Two	37	2	3	0	0	0	3 (Note: One appearance in Football League Trophy, two in League Two play-offs)	0	43	2
Aldershot Town	2010–11	League Two	38	2	3	0	1	0	2 (Note: Appearance(s) in Football League Trophy)	0	44	2
Aldershot Town	2011–12	League Two	44	2	3	0	3	0	1	0	51	2
Aldershot Town	Total		194	6	15	0	4	0	16	1	229	7
Wycombe Wanderers (loan)	2010–11	League Two	4	0	—		—		—		4	0
Southend United	2012–13	League Two	28	0	1	0	1	0	4	0	34	0
Southend United	2013–14	League Two	39	2	4	3	1	0	3 (Note: One appearance in Football League Trophy, two appearances and one goal in League Two play-offs)	1	47	6
Southend United	Total		67	2	5	3	2	0	7	1	81	6
York City	2014–15	League Two	12	0	0	0	1	0	1	0	14	0
York City	2015–16	League Two	11	0	0	0	0	0	2	0	13	0
York City	Total		23	0	0	0	1	0	3	0	27	0
Motherwell (loan)	2014–15	Scottish Premiership	12	0	—		—		1 (Note: Appearance in Scottish Premiership play-offs)	0	13	0
Grimsby Town	2015–16	National League	2	0	—		—		1 (Note: Appearance in FA Trophy)	0	3	0
Aldershot Town	2016–17	National League	33	0	1	0	—		3 (Note: Two appearances in FA Trophy, one in National League play-offs)	0	37	0
Bath City	2017–18	National League South	36	1	4	0	—		0	0	40	1
Bath City	2018–19	National League South	41	7	3	0	—		3 (Note: Two appearances in FA Trophy, one in National League South play-offs)	0	47	7
Bath City	Total		77	8	7	0	—		3	0	87	8
Havant & Waterloovile	2019–20	National League South	0	0	0	0	—		0	0	0	0
Career total			412	16	28	3	7	0	34	2	481	21

=== International ===
As of match played 8 September 2015

Appearances and goals by national team and year
National team	Year	Apps	Goals
Grenada	2011	5	0
Grenada	2012	3	0
Grenada	2015	2	1
Total		10	1

=== International goals ===
As of match played 8 September 2015. Grenada score listed first, score column indicates score after each Straker goal.

International goals by date, venue, cap, opponent, score, result and competition
No.	Date	Venue	Cap	Opponent	Score	Result	Competition	Ref
1	4 September 2015	Grenada National Stadium, St. George's, Grenada	9	Haiti	1–1	1–3	2018 FIFA World Cup qualification	

== Honours ==
Aldershot Town

- Conference Premier: 2007–08
- Conference League Cup: 2007–08

Southend United

- Football League Trophy runner-up: 2012–13

Individual

- National League South Team of the Year: 2018–19
