= Damian Spencer =

English footballer

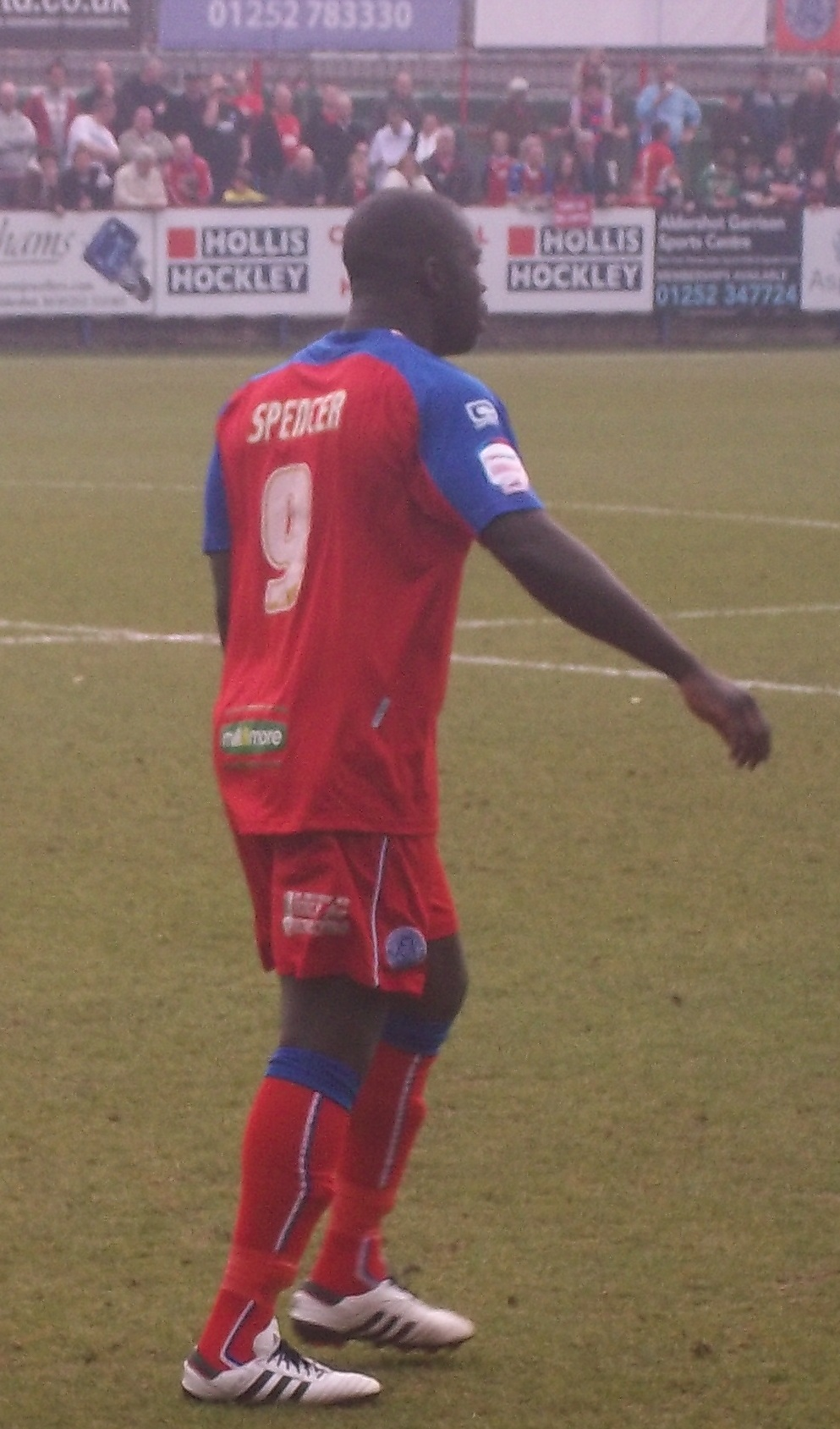

Personal information
- Full name: Damian Michael Spencer
- Date of birth: 19 September 1981 (age 45)
- Place of birth: Ascot, England
- Height: 6 ft 1 in (1.85 m)
- Position: Striker

Senior career*
Years	Team	Apps	(Gls)
1998	Windsor & Eton	9	(3)
1998–2001	Bristol City	13	(2)
2001	→ Exeter City (loan)	6	(0)
2002–2009	Cheltenham Town	227	(40)
2009	→ Brentford (loan)	5	(1)
2009–2010	Kettering Town	18	(2)
2009–2010	→ Kidderminster Harriers (loan)	8	(2)
2010	→ Aldershot Town (loan)	14	(0)
2010–2011	Aldershot Town	12	(3)
2011	→ Eastbourne Borough (loan)	1	(0)
2011–2012	Grimsby Town	7	(0)
2012	Windsor		
Total		320	(60)
- * Club domestic league appearances and goals

Damian Michael Spencer (born 19 September 1981) is an English former professional footballer who played as a forward from 1998 to 2012.

He played for Windsor & Eton, Bristol City, Exeter City, Cheltenham Town, Brentford, Kidderminster Harriers, Aldershot Town, Eastbourne Borough, Grimsby Town and Windsor.

== Career ==
He started his career with Windsor & Eton, before moving into the football league with Bristol City. He was released by Bristol City in April 2001, and had a spell with non-League club Atherstone United, before joining Cheltenham Town in 2002. Whilst at Bristol City he also had a loan spell with Exeter City.

In January 2008, he was set to join fellow League One side Crewe Alexandra for £150,000. However, a long-standing knee injury meant that he failed his medical examination, which meant that the potential transfer collapsed.

He joined Brentford on loan on 20 March 2009, after financial constraints forced his parent club Cheltenham to reduce their wage bill. In July 2009, Spencer left Cheltenham Town, and signed for Kettering Town.

He was signed on loan in November 2009 to Conference National side Kidderminster Harriers. In February 2010, he joined League Two outfit Aldershot Town on loan until the end of the season. He subsequently joined Aldershot on a one-year contract in July 2010.

On 24 June 2011 Damian signed a one-year contract with Grimsby Town. After struggling to break into the first team setup at Grimsby, his contract was cancelled by mutual consent on Thursday 5 January 2012.

On 31 March 2012 Spencer joined Windsor until the end of the season.

In February 2013 he was playing in the Cheltenham League Division Three for Village Real.

== Career statistics ==
As of 23 March 2011

Appearances and goals by club, season and competition
Club	Season	League			FA Cup		League Cup		Total	
Club	Season	Division	Apps	Goals	Apps	Goals	Apps	Goals	Apps	Goals
Windsor & Eton	1998–99	Isthmian League Second Division	9	3	0	0	0	0	9	3
Bristol City	1998–99	First Division	0	0	0	0	0	0	0	0
Bristol City	1999–2000	Second Division	9	1	0	0	0	0	9	1
Bristol City	2000–01	Second Division	4	0	0	0	1	0	5	0
Bristol City	2001–02	Second Division	0	0	0	0	0	0	0	0
Bristol City	Total		13	1	0	0	1	0	14	1
Exeter City (loan)	2000–01	Third Division	6	0	0	0	0	0	6	0
Cheltenham Town	2002–03	Second Division	30	6	2	0	0	0	32	6
Cheltenham Town	2003–04	Third Division	36	9	3	1	1	0	40	10
Cheltenham Town	2004–05	League Two	41	8	1	1	1	0	43	9
Cheltenham Town	2005–06	League Two	46	3	6	0	2	0	54	3
Cheltenham Town	2006–07	League One	27	4	2	0	1	0	30	4
Cheltenham Town	2007–08	League One	30	3	2	0	0	0	32	3
Cheltenham Town	2008–09	League One	14	3	3	0	0	0	17	3
Cheltenham Town	Total		224	36	19	2	5	0	248	38
Brentford (loan)	2008–09	League Two	5	1	0	0	0	0	5	1
Kettering Town	2009–10	Conference Premier	18	2	1	0	0	0	19	2
Kidderminster Harriers (loan)	2009–10	Conference Premier	8	2	0	0	0	0	8	2
Aldershot Town (loan)	2009–10	League Two	14	0	0	0	0	0	14	0
Aldershot Town	2010–11	League Two	12	3	0	0	1	0	13	3
Eastbourne Borough (loan)	2010–11	Conference Premier	1	0	0	0	0	0	1	0
Career total			310	48	20	2	7	0	335	49

== Honours ==
Bristol City

- Football League Trophy runner-up: 1999–2000

Cheltenham Town

- Football League Two play-offs: 2006

Grimsby Town

- Lincolnshire Senior Cup: 2011–12
