= 2009–10 Aldershot Town F.C. season =

Aldershot Town
2009–10 season
- Manager: Gary Waddock until October 2009; Kevin Dillon from November 2009
- Stadium: Recreation Ground
- Football League Two: 6th (lost in play-off semifinal)
- FA Cup: Second round
- Football League Cup: First round
- Football League Trophy: Second round
- Top goalscorer: Marvin Morgan 15
- Highest home attendance: 4,506
- Lowest home attendance: 2,053
- Average home league attendance: 3,085

The 2009–10 season is the 18th year of football played by Aldershot Town and covers the period from 8th of August 2009 to 8th of May 2010.

== Match results ==
=== Friendlies ===
Friendly match details
Date	Opponents	Venue	Result	Score F–A	Scorers	Attendance	Ref.
4 July 2009	Alton Town	Away	W	2–1	Hinds 42', Fennell 44'	569	
7 July 2009	Camberley Town	Away	D	3–3	Bolle 15', Wasiu 25' (pen), Hopkinson 35'	233	
11 July 2009	QPR	Home	L	0–4		2,214	

=== Football League Two ===
League Two match details
Date	Opponents	Venue	Result	Score F–A	Scorers	Attendance	Ref.
8 August 2009	Darlington	Home	W	3–1	M. Morgan 3', Sandell 30', Soares 47'	2,866	
15 August 2009	Rochdale	Away	L	0–1		2,465	
18 August 2009	AFC Bournemouth	Away	L	0–1		5,556	
22 August 2009	Accrington Stanley	Home	W	3–1	Donnelly 8', 90', M. Morgan 22'	2,276	
29 August 2009	Grimsby Town	Away	W	2–1	Donnelly 27', 49'	3,757	
5 September 2009	Hereford United	Home	D	2–2	Hylton 86', M. Morgan 87'	3,094	
12 September 2009	Port Vale	Home	D	1–1	Soares 38'	3,406	
19 September 2009	Crewe Alexandra	Away	W	2–1	Donnelly 33', Hudson 66'	3,661	
26 September 2009	Cheltenham Town	Home	W	4–1	Winfield 34', Charles 69', M. Morgan 73', Donnelly 90+2	2,964	
29 September 2009	Torquay United	Away	D	1–1	M. Morgan 48' pen.	2,271	
3 October 2009	Lincoln City	Away	L	0–1		4,131	
10 October 2009	Morecambe	Home	W	4–1	M. Morgan 14', Stanley 47' o.g., Hudson 67', Soares 80'	2,974	
17 October 2009	Bury	Home	L	2–3	Winfield 9', Soares 71'	3,196	
24 October 2009	Shrewsbury Town	Away	L	1–3	Soares 4'	5,417	
31 October 2009	Rotherham United	Away	D	0–0		3,002	
14 November 2009	Macclesfield Town	Home	D	0–0		2,646	
21 November 2009	Notts County	Away	D	0–0		6,500	
24 November 2009	Northampton Town	Home	W	2–1	Donnelly 80' pen., M. Morgan 89'	2,761	
1 December 2009	Dagenham & Redbridge	Away	W	5–2	Charles 30', Sandell 52', M. Morgan 59', Jackson 77', Soares 90+1'	1,876	
5 December 2009	Chesterfield	Home	W	1–0	Charles 68'	2,977	
12 December 2009	Burton Albion	Away	L	1–6	Grant 67'	2,547	
26 December 2009	Barnet	Home	W	4–0	Grant 36', 59', Sandell 65', Donnelly 77' pen.	3,231	
19 January 2010	Rochdale	Home	D	1–1	Soares 87'	2,453	
23 January 2010	AFC Bournemouth	Home	W	2–1	Sandell 21', Straker 87'	4,387	
26 January 2010	Accrington Stanley	Away	L	1–2	Sandell 59' pen.	1,279	
30 January 2010	Grimsby Town	Home	D	1–1	Hylton 68'	3,195	
6 February 2010	Barnet	Away	L	0–3		2,145	
12 February 2010	Northampton Town	Away	W	3–0	M. Morgan 12', 75' Hudson 68'	4,718	
16 February 2010	Hereford United	Away	L	0–2		1,576	
20 February 2010	Notts County	Home	D	1–1	Bozanic 45'	4,016	
23 February 2010	Dagenham & Redbridge	Home	L	2–3	Hudson 22', Donnelly 51'	2,053	
27 February 2010	Chesterfield	Away	W	1–0	Hylton 64'	3,827	
2 March 2010	Bradford City	Home	W	1–0	Charles 54'	2,311	
6 March 2010	Burton Albion	Home	L	0–2		2,784	
13 March 2010	Bradford City	Away	L	1–2	Straker 8'	11,272	
20 March 2010	Shrewsbury Town	Home	W	2–0	Bozanic 29', M. Morgan 74'	2,681	
23 March 2010	Darlington	Away	W	2–1	Brown 25', M. Morgan 41'	1,296	
27 March 2010	Bury	Away	W	2–1	Donnelly 30' pen., 56'	2,795	
3 April 2010	Macclesfield Town	Away	D	1–1	Donnelly 76' pen.	1,428	
5 April 2010	Rotherham United	Home	W	3–0	D. Morgan 16', M. Morgan 82', Howell 87'	3,573	
10 April 2010	Port Vale	Away	D	1–1	D. Morgan 63'	5,399	
13 April 2010	Torquay United	Home	L	0–2		3,652	
17 April 2010	Crewe Alexandra	Home	D	1–1	Harding 41'	2,966	
24 April 2010	Cheltenham Town	Away	W	2–1	Donnelly 48' pen., D. Morgan 90'	3,386	
1 May 2010	Lincoln City	Home	W	3–1	M. Morgan 69', 75', D. Morgan 73'	4,506	
8 May 2010	Morecambe	Away	L	0–1		5,268	

==== Play-offs ====
League Two play-offs match details
Round	Date	Opponents	Venue	Result	Score F–A	Scorers	Attendance	Ref.
Semi-final first leg	15 May 2010	Rotherham United	Home	L	0–1		5,470	
Semi-final second leg	19 May 2010	Rotherham United	Away	L	0–2		7,082	

=== FA Cup ===
FA Cup match details
Round	Date	Opponents	Venue	Result	Score F–A	Scorers	Attendance	Ref.
First round	7 November 2009	Bury	Home	W	2–0	Soares 13', Donnelly 33'	2,519	
Second round	28 November 2009	Tranmere Rovers	Away	D	0–0		3,742	
Second round replay	8 December 2009	Tranmere Rovers	Home	L	1–2	Bozanic 90+4'	4,060	

=== League Cup ===
League Cup match details
Round	Date	Opponents	Venue	Result	Score F–A	Scorers	Attendance	Ref.
First round	11 August 2009	Bristol Rovers	Away	L	1–2	Morgan 60' (pen.)	3,644	

=== Football League Trophy ===
Football League Trophy match details
Round	Date	Opponents	Venue	Result	Score F–A	Scorers	Attendance	Ref.
First round	6 October 2009	Hereford United	Away	D	2–2; 3–4 pens.	Hudson 15', Soares 90+4'	897	

== Statistics ==
=== Appearances ===
Name	League	League Cup	Johnstone's Paint Trophy	FA Cup	Total
Chris Blackburn	7	1	0	0	8
Lewis Chalmers	1+2	1	0	0	2+2
Reece Connolly	0+2	0	0	0	0+1
Scott Donnelly	7	1	0	0	8
John Grant	0+4	0+1	0	0	0+5
John Halls	7	1	0	0	8
Ben Harding	6	1	0	0	7
Ben Herd	1	0	0	0	1
Adam Hinshelwood	6	1	0	0	7
Kirk Hudson	7	1	0	0	8
Danny Hylton	1+4	0+1	0	0	1+5
Mikhael Jaimez-Ruiz	7	0	0	0	7
Clark Masters	0	1	0	0	1
Marvin Morgan	7	1	0	0	8
Louie Soares	7	1	0	0	8
Dave Winfield	5	0	0	0	5

=== Goalscorers ===
Name	League	League Cup	Total
Scott Donnelly	5	0	5
Marvin Morgan	3	1	4
Louis Soares	2	0	2
Andy Sandell	1	0	1
Danny Hylton	1	0	1
Kirk Hudson	1	0	1

== Transfers ==
=== Transfers in ===
Date	Position	Name	From	Fee	Ref.
28 July 2009	MF	John Halls	Brentford	Free	
24 July 2009	DF	Ben Herd	Shrewsbury Town	Free	
28 July 2009	DF	Adam Hinshelwood	Brighton & Hove Albion	Free	
23 July 2009	GK	Clark Masters	Southend United	Free	

=== Transfers out ===
Date	Position	Name	To	Fee	Ref.
30 June 2009	MF	Ricky Newman	Unattached	Free	
30 June 2009	FW	Junior Mendes	Ilkeston Town (Note: Day joined Ilkeston Town following his release)	Free	
30 June 2009	DF	Rhys Day	Oxford United (Note: Day joined Oxford United following his release)	Free	
30 June 2009	FW	Rob Elvins	Worcester City (Note: Elvins joined Worcester City following his release)	Free	
3 August 2009	GK	Nikki Bull	Brentford	Free	
1 January 2010	DF	Adam Hinshelwood	Wycombe Wanderers	Undisclosed	

=== Loans in ===
Date from	Position	Name	From	Date until	Ref.
17 September 2009	MF	Dean Parrett	Tottenham Hotspur	17 October 2009	
10 April 2010	DF	Piotr Piotrowicz	ŁKS Łódź		
