= John Halls =

English footballer (born 1982)

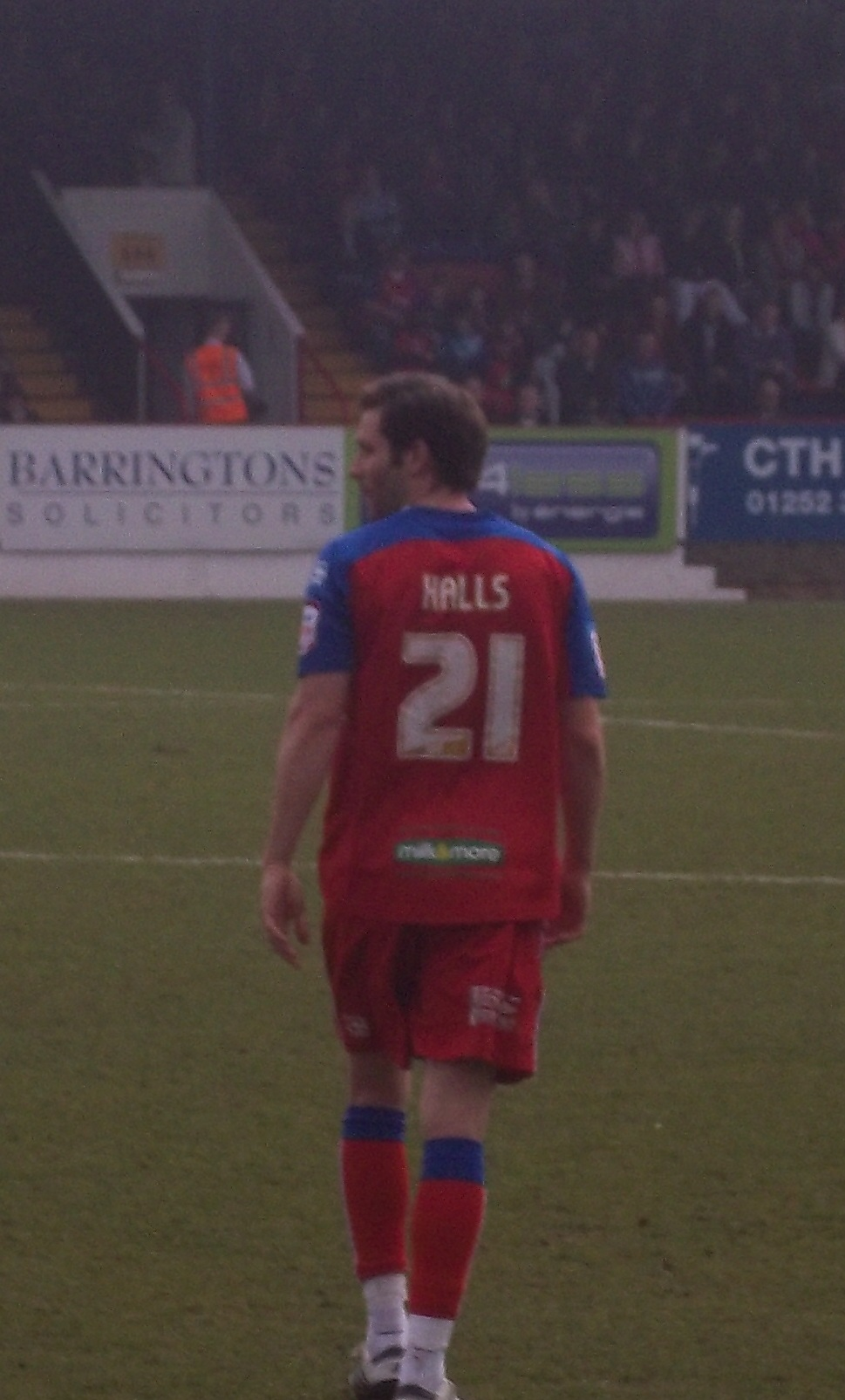
- Halls playing for Aldershot Town

Personal information
- Date of birth: 14 February 1982 (age 44)
- Place of birth: Islington, England
- Height: 6 ft 0 in (1.83 m)
- Position: Defender

Youth career
- 1998–2000: Arsenal

Senior career*
Years	Team	Apps	(Gls)
2000–2003	Arsenal	1	(0)
2002	→ Colchester United (loan)	6	(0)
2002–2003	→ Beveren (loan)	12	(0)
2003	→ Stoke City (loan)	8	(0)
2003–2006	Stoke City	61	(2)
2006–2008	Reading	2	(1)
2007	→ Preston North End (loan)	4	(0)
2008	→ Crystal Palace (loan)	5	(0)
2008	→ Sheffield United (loan)	6	(0)
2008–2009	Brentford	23	(0)
2009–2011	Aldershot Town	39	(1)
2011–2012	Wycombe Wanderers	7	(0)
Total		173	(4)

International career
2001–2002	England U20	6	(0)
- * Club domestic league appearances and goals

John Halls (born 14 February 1982) is a model and former English footballer.

Halls began his career with Arsenal making three appearances in the League Cup for the "Gunners" before spending time out on loan at Colchester United, Belgian club Beveren and Stoke City. He joined Stoke on a permanent basis in December 2003 and became a regular in the side. He left for Reading in January after rejecting a new contract with Stoke but he struggled to force his way into a Reading side who were well on their way to gaining promotion to the Premier League and despite spending three season at the Madjeski Stadium Halls managed just eight appearances and spent time on loan at Preston North End, Crystal Palace and Sheffield United. He then played for lower league sides Brentford, Aldershot Town and Wycombe Wanderers. After leaving Wycombe in May 2012 Halls decided to retire and set up his own male fashion business. Halls currently models for Next Models.

== Club career ==
=== Arsenal ===
His career began in Arsenal's youth set-up, where he featured in the FA Youth Cup-winning team of 2000. However, the young defender found first-team football at Highbury hard to come by, making only a few League Cup appearances for the club. The first of these League Cup appearances was as a substitute against Manchester United in November 2001, a game in which Halls was dismissed for two bookable offences. Like many Arsenal juniors, he was frequently loaned out; firstly to Colchester United in January 2002 where he made six first-team appearances.

The player spent the entire 2002–03 season playing for KSK Beveren in Belgian First Division along with fellow Arsenal youngsters Graham Stack, Steve Sidwell and Liam Chilvers. These loans came about as part of an agreement between the two clubs which existed between 2001 and 2006. In October 2003, Halls was loaned out again, this time to Stoke City, making his debut in the home match versus Nottingham Forest on 4 October.

=== Stoke City ===
After impressing manager Tony Pulis during his loan spell Halls joined Stoke City on a permanent basis in December 2003 and spent a little over two years at the Britannia Stadium before his departure in January 2006. During this period he featured in a total of 66 games (plus eight whilst on loan) and scored two goals. Both of these goals were scored in consecutive matches during August 2005. The first came in a 4–2 defeat at Leicester City, whilst the second was notched in a 1–0 defeat of Millwall. Halls also accumulated a total of three red cards during his time at Stoke.

His last appearance in a Stoke shirt was on 28 December 2005 at home to Leeds United. Halls' contract was due to expire in the summer of 2006 but the player had expressed a desire to seek pastures new, provoking a number of clubs to show an interest in capturing his signature.

=== Reading ===
High-flying Reading paid an initial fee of £250,000 for Halls' services on 19 January 2006. Fellow Championship sides Crystal Palace and Southampton had both shown interest in signing Halls at the time.

Halls made his Reading debut in the fourth round FA Cup tie versus Birmingham City on 28 January 2006. The match finished 1–1, with Birmingham proceeding to the next round after a replay. He had to bide his time until making his league bow in April 2006, against his former club, Stoke, he also scored in this game, helping Reading to a 3–1 victory. The player found his first team chances limited after Reading's promotion in 2006. In the 2006–07 season he did not make a single Premier League appearance, having to settle for two League Cup appearances. His chances of breaking into the first team were hampered by an achilles injury which plagued him throughout the season.

Halls' one and only Premier League appearance to date was away at Bolton Wanderers in August 2007. This was followed by two more League Cup run-outs, one of which was a game at home to Liverpool in which Halls scored. As first team opportunities again proved scarce at the Madejski Stadium he was loaned out on three separate occasions in the 2007–08 season. Halls was loaned out to Championship sides Preston North End, Crystal Palace, and Sheffield United making a handful of appearances for each. Despite Reading's relegation into the Championship, Halls was released by the club on 16 May 2008. During his two-and-a-half-year stay at Reading he made eight first-team appearances, the majority of which came in cup competitions. He also scored two goals, one each in the Championship and the League Cup.

On 19 July, Halls featured in a pre-season match for Blackpool, with whom he was on trial. The match was played at Wrexham's Racecourse Ground and finished goalless.

On 26 August, it was announced on the official Sheffield Wednesday website that Halls had joined the club on trial. Halls would play in a friendly against Shrewsbury Town on 27 August. Halls was rejected by Sheffield Wednesday after failing to impress in that game against Shrewsbury Town.

=== Brentford ===
Halls joined Brentford on a one-year deal on 25 September 2008. He featured 23 times for the club before being released at the end of the season.

=== Aldershot Town ===
The summer of 2009 saw Halls leave Griffin Park and he joined Aldershot Town as a trialist. The club confirmed on 28 July 2009 that Halls had signed a two-year contract. Halls was allocated the number 11 shirt for the 2009–10 season and on 6 August, Gary Waddock announced that Halls would be the vice-captain for the season. Whilst playing in a reserve game for Aldershot, Halls was sent off for punching an opposition player. He moved on a free transfer to Wycombe Wanderers at the end of the 2010–2011 season.

=== Wycombe Wanderers ===
Halls joined up again with Gary Waddock at Wycombe signing a one-year contract in June 2011 on a free transfer from Aldershot. Halls struggled in his first few performances for the club with the player and management blaming it on a hidden injury. Halls has rarely appeared since then due to further injuries and poor performances, leaving him outcast. He was released by the club in May 2012 and retired from football.

== International career ==
Halls was capped by England at U20 level.

== After football ==
After leaving Wycombe Wanderers in May 2012, Halls decided to set up his own male fashion business.

== Career statistics ==
Appearances and goals by club, season and competition
Club	Season	League			FA Cup		League Cup		Europe		Other		Total	
Club	Season	Division	Apps	Goals	Apps	Goals	Apps	Goals	Apps	Goals	Apps	Goals	Apps	Goals
Arsenal	2000–01	Premier League	0	0	0	0	0	0	0	0	―		0	0
Arsenal	2001–02	Premier League	0	0	0	0	3	0	0	0	―		3	0
Arsenal	Total		0	0	0	0	3	0	0	0	―		3	0
Colchester United (loan)	2001–02	Second Division	6	0	―		―		―		0	0	6	0
Beveren (loan)	2002–03	Belgian First Division	12	0	0	0	―		―		―		12	0
Stoke City	2003–04	First Division	34	0	2	0	0	0	―		―		36	0
Stoke City	2004–05	Championship	22	0	1	0	1	0	―		―		24	0
Stoke City	2005–06	Championship	13	2	―		1	0	―		―		14	2
Stoke City	Total		69	2	3	0	2	0	―		―		74	2
Reading	2005–06	Championship	1	1	2	0	―		―		―		3	1
Reading	2006–07	Premier League	0	0	0	0	2	0	―		―		2	0
Reading	2007–08	Premier League	1	0	0	0	2	1	―		―		3	1
Reading	Total		2	1	2	0	4	1	―		―		8	2
Preston North End (loan)	2007–08	Championship	4	0	0	0	―		―		―		4	0
Crystal Palace (loan)	2007–08	Championship	5	0	―		―		―		―		5	0
Sheffield United (loan)	2007–08	Championship	6	0	―		―		―		―		6	0
Brentford	2008–09	League Two	23	0	1	0	―		―		0	0	24	0
Aldershot Town	2009–10	League Two	16	0	2	0	1	0	―		2 (Note: Appearances in League Two play-offs)	0	21	0
Aldershot Town	2010–11	League Two	23	1	0	0	0	0	―		2 (Note: Appearances in Football League Trophy)	0	25	1
Aldershot Town	Total		39	1	2	0	1	0	―		4	0	46	1
Wycombe Wanderers	2011–12	League Two	7	0	0	0	1	0	―		0	0	9	0
Career total			173	4	8	0	11	1	0	0	2	0	195	5

== Honours ==
Arsenal

- FA Youth Cup: 1999–2000

Brentford

- Football League Two: 2008–09
