= Kirk Hudson =

English footballer (born 1986)

Personal information
- Full name: Kirk Hudson
- Date of birth: 12 December 1986 (age 39)
- Place of birth: Southend-on-Sea, England
- Height: 6 ft 0 in (1.83 m)
- Positions: Right winger; forward

Youth career
- –2004: Ipswich Town
- 2004–2005: Celtic

Senior career*
Years	Team	Apps	(Gls)
2005	AFC Bournemouth	1	(0)
2005	Thurrock	0	(0)
2006–2010	Aldershot Town	148	(28)
2006	→ Ashford Town (loan)	4	(0)
2010–2012	Brentford	2	(0)
2010–2011	→ AFC Wimbledon (loan)	14	(1)
2012	Canvey Island	2	(0)
2012–2014	White Ensign	7	(2)
2016–2022	Shoebury Town	64	(22)
Total		242	(52)
- * Club domestic league appearances and goals

Kirk Hudson (born 12 December 1986) is an English former professional footballer who played as a right winger in the Football League, most notably for Aldershot Town. He also briefly played League football for Brentford and AFC Bournemouth.

== Career ==
=== Youth years ===
A right winger, Hudson began his career as a schoolboy with Ipswich Town. He entered the academy at Celtic in 2004 and was a part of the team which finished as runners-up in the 2004 Jersey International Tournament. Hudson won the 2004–05 SPL U19 League and Scottish Youth Cup double with the U19 team, but was released in May 2005.

=== AFC Bournemouth ===
During the 2005–06 pre-season, Hudson joined League One club AFC Bournemouth on trial and impressed enough to sign a three-month contract on 5 August 2005. He was a regular inclusion on the substitutes' bench early in the regular season and made his professional debut as a late substitute for James Keene in a 2–1 win over Swindon Town on 17 September. Hudson again appeared as a late substitute in the following League Cup match, but was not called into the squad again and was released at the end of his contract.

=== Aldershot Town ===
==== Football Conference (2006–2008) ====
After a non-playing spell with Conference South club Thurrock and failing a trial with League One high-flyers Southend United, Hudson joined Conference Premier club Aldershot Town on trial in January 2006. He made his debut with a start in a Hampshire Senior Cup quarter-final match versus Basingstoke Town on 14 January and scored both the Shots' goals in the 3–2 defeat. After the match, he joined the club on non-contract terms and made his league debut with a late substitute cameo in a 3–1 victory over Halifax Town on 21 January. After recovering from a bout of mumps, Hudson was a regular in the team through to the end of the season and finished 2005–06 with 13 appearances and four goals. He signed a permanent contract in July 2006.

After three substitute appearances early in the 2006–07 season, Hudson joined Southern League Western Division club Ashford Town (Middlesex) on a one-month loan, which was later extended for a second month. He made four league appearances. Upon his return to Aldershot Town in November 2006, he was utilised as an impact substitute and scored four goals in six appearances during the club's Hampshire Senior Cup-winning campaign. Hudson signed a new one-year contract in April 2007 and had an excellent 2007–08 season, making 48 appearances and scoring 12 goals to help the Shots to the Conference Premier title and promotion to the Football League. He also contributed to Aldershot's Conference League Cup Final victory over Rushden & Diamonds (scoring a goal in the 3–3 draw and then converting a penalty in the deciding shootout), in addition to winning the February 2008 Conference Premier Player of the Month award and being voted the Conference Young Player of the Year. Hudson signed a new two-year contract in March 2008.

==== Football League (2008–2010) ====
Now playing League Two football, Hudson began the 2008–09 season as a regular starter, but despite scoring five goals by mid-November 2008, manager Garry Waddock felt the need to challenge him to play with more consistency. Hudson responded by scoring three goals in four matches in December, which earned him a nomination for the League Two Player of the Month award. A season of consolidation in the Football League ended with Hudson having made 48 appearances and scored 13 goals, an improvement on his figures of the previous season in the Conference Premier.

Despite again beginning the season as a starter, Hudson found the going harder in 2009–10, in a Shots team pushing for a playoff place. He lost his starting place in January 2010 and only regained it for four matches in March. Just two defeats from the final 11 matches of the season saw Aldershot finish sixth, which qualified the club for a playoff place. The Shots were defeated 3–0 on aggregate to Rotherham United in the semi-finals and Hudson made what would be his final appearance for the club as a second-half substitute in the second leg on 19 May. Hudson was released by manager Kevin Dillon after the defeat and he finished his career at the Recreation Ground with 172 appearances and 42 goals.

=== Brentford ===
On 28 June 2010, Hudson joined League One club Brentford on a two-year contract for a fee that was later decided by an "amicable agreement". Manager Andy Scott stated in early July that he hoped to convert Hudson into a centre forward. Hudson picked up a groin injury a week before the beginning of the 2010–11 season, but returned to fitness in September and made his debut as a substitute for Nicky Adams after 66 minutes of a 1–0 defeat to Leyton Orient late in the month. Hudson made just three further substitute appearances over the following six weeks and requested a loan move in November 2010. On 31 December 2010, Hudson reunited with his former Aldershot Town manager Terry Brown on loan at Conference Premier club AFC Wimbledon. Despite missing three weeks with a recurrence of the groin injury suffered in July 2010, Hudson made 14 appearances and scored one goal during the remainder of the 2010–11 season.

Hudson was ruled out of the early months of the 2011–12 season with a hip injury suffered in July 2011. After returning to fitness in October, potential loan moves to Southend United and Hayes & Yeading United fell through and he departed Griffin Park by mutual consent on 12 March 2012, having failed to win a call into the first team squad since November 2010.

=== Return to non-League football ===
On 21 August 2012, Hudson joined Isthmian League Premier Division club Canvey Island. He made just three substitute appearances before departing the club on 20 September. Hudson later played for Essex Olympian League clubs White Ensign and Shoebury Town between 2012 and 2022. He then transitioned into veterans' football, with Wakering Sports, Corinthians and Leigh United.

== Personal life ==
Hudson is an Arsenal supporter. As of November 2005, he was living in Shoeburyness.

== Career statistics ==
As of match played 9 April 2022

Appearances and goals by club, season and competition
Club	Season	League			FA Cup		League Cup		Other		Total	
Club	Season	Division	Apps	Goals	Apps	Goals	Apps	Goals	Apps	Goals	Apps	Goals
AFC Bournemouth	2005–06	League One	1	0	0	0	1	0	0	0	2	0
Thurrock (loan)	2005–06	Conference South	0	0	—		—		—		0	0
Aldershot Town	2005–06	Conference Premier	12	2	—		—		1 (Note: Appearance in Hampshire Senior Cup)	2	13	4
Aldershot Town	2006–07	Conference Premier	25	4	—		—		7 (Note: 6 appearances and 4 goals in Hampshire Senior Cup, 1 appearance in FA Trophy)	4	32	8
Aldershot Town	2007–08	Conference Premier	34	7	0	0	—		7 (Note: 3 appearances and 1 goal in FA Trophy, 3 appearances and 2 goals in Conference League Cup, 1 appearance and 2 goals in Hampshire Senior Cup)	5	41	12
Aldershot Town	2008–09	League Two	43	11	3	2	1	0	1 (Note: Appearance in Football League Trophy)	0	48	13
Aldershot Town	2009–10	League Two	34	4	1	0	1	0	2 (Note: 1 appearance in Football League playoffs, 1 appearance and 1 goal in Football League Trophy)	1	38	5
Aldershot Town	Total		148	28	4	2	2	0	18	12	172	42
Ashford Town (Middlesex) (loan)	2006–07	Southern League Western Division	4	0	1	1	—		0	0	5	1
Brentford	2010–11	League One	2	0	1	0	0	0	1	0	4	0
AFC Wimbledon (loan)	2010–11	Conference Premier	14	1	—		—		2 (Note: 1 appearance in FA Trophy, 1 appearance in London Senior Cup)	0	16	1
Canvey Island	2012–13	Isthmian League Premier Division	2	0	1	0	—		—		3	0
White Ensign	2012–13	Essex Olympian League Premier Division	5	2	—		—		0	0	5	2
White Ensign	2013–14	Essex Olympian League Premier Division	2	0	—		—		0	0	2	0
White Ensign	Total		7	2	—		—		0	0	7	2
Shoebury Town	2016–17	Essex Olympian League Third Division	16	9	—		—		2 (Note: Appearance(s) in Essex Olympian League Senior League Cup)	2	18	11
Shoebury Town	2017–18	Essex Olympian League Third Division	17	7	—		—		1	0	18	7
Shoebury Town	2018–19	Essex Olympian League Second Division	9	3	—		—		1	0	10	3
Shoebury Town	2019–20	Essex Olympian League First Division	4	0	—		—		0	0	4	0
Shoebury Town	2020–21	Essex Olympian League First Division	5	1	—		—		0	0	5	1
Shoebury Town	2021–22	Essex Olympian League Second Division	13	2	—		—		1 (Note: Appearance in Essex Saturday Premier Cup)	0	14	2
Shoebury Town	Total		64	22	—		—		5	2	69	24
Career total			242	52	7	3	3	0	26	14	278	58

== Honours ==
Aldershot Town

- Conference Premier: 2007–08
- Conference League Cup: 2007–08
- Hampshire Senior Cup: 2006–07

Individual

- Football Conference Young Player of the Year: 2007–08
- Football Conference Premier Player of the Month: February 2008
