= 2007–08 Conference League Cup =

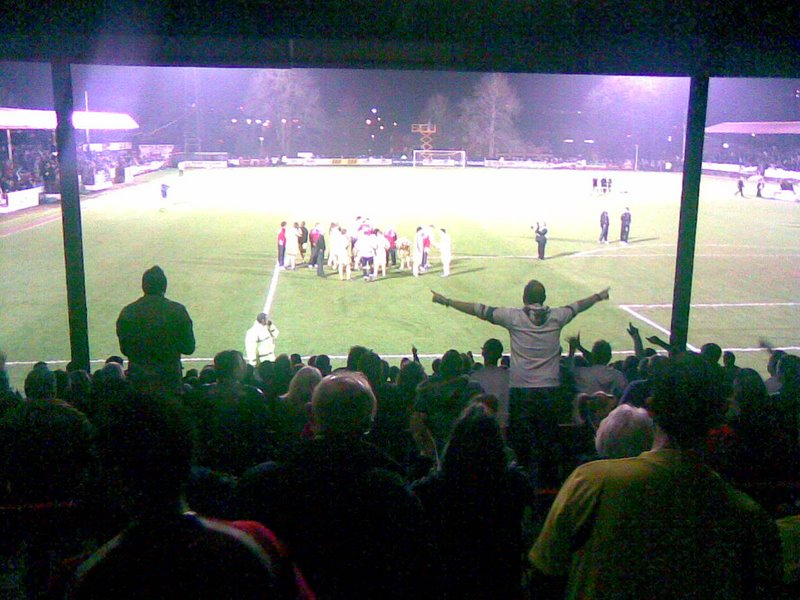
- Rushden & Diamonds fans after the full-time whistle of the final

Tournament details
- Country: England; Wales
- Teams: 68

Final positions
- Champions: Aldershot Town (1st title)
- Runners-up: Rushden & Diamonds

The 2007–08 Conference League Cup, known as the Setanta Shield for sponsorship reasons, was the inaugural season of the Conference League Cup competition after its resurrection by Conference sponsors Blue Square and competition sponsors Setanta. With the entrance of all Conference teams from every division, there were 68 entries into the tournament. The competition was won by Aldershot Town, who beat Rushden & Diamonds on penalties in the final.

== Calendar ==
Round	Date	Matches	Clubs	New entries this round	Prize money
First Round	1 October 2007	12	68 → 56	24	£1,500
Second Round	12 November 2007	16	56 → 40	20	£2,000
Third Round	3 December 2007	8	40 → 32	none	£2,500
Fourth Round	22 December 2007	16	32 → 16	24	£2,500
Fifth Round	4 February 2008	8	16 → 8	none	£3,500
Quarter-finals	26 February 2008	4	8 → 4	none	£5,000
Semi-finals	11 March 2008	2	4 → 2	none	£5,500
Final	3 April 2008	1	2 → 1	none	£12,000

== First round ==
The first round was contested by 24 teams from the Northern and Southern Divisions, and divided into a Northern and Southern section. Matches were played in the week commencing 1 October 2007.

=== Northern Section ===
Tie no	Home team	Score	Away team
1	A.F.C. Telford United	3–2 (aet)	Solihull Moors
2	Alfreton Town	3–0	Hucknall Town
3	Barrow	4–0	Leigh RMI
4	Burscough	2–0	Vauxhall Motors
5	Gainsborough Trinity	1–2	Boston United
6	Stalybridge Celtic	0–0	Blyth Spartans
Blyth Spartans won 4–3 on penalties

=== Southern Section ===
Tie no	Home team	Score	Away team
7	Basingstoke Town	1–3	Hampton & Richmond Borough
8	Bath City	3–2 (aet)	Weston-super-Mare
9	Bromley	2–1	Sutton United
10	Cambridge City	1–3	Thurrock
11	Dorchester Town	3–2	Eastleigh
12	Maidenhead United	3–0	Hayes & Yeading United

== Second round ==
The second round was contested by the 12 winners of the previous round, plus the remaining 20 members of the lower Conference Divisions. Matches were played in the week commencing 12 November 2007.

=== Northern Section ===
Tie no	Home team	Score	Away team
1	A.F.C. Telford United	2–0	Redditch United
2	Alfreton Town	1–2	Hinckley United
3	Harrogate Town	3–2 (aet)	Blyth Spartans
4	Kettering Town	2–0	Boston United
5	Southport	3–2	Burscough
6	Tamworth	3–2 (aet)	Hyde United
7	Workington	2–2	Barrow
Barrow won 7–6 on penalties
8	Worcester City	1–2	Nuneaton Borough

=== Southern Section ===
Tie no	Home team	Score	Away team
9	Hampton & Richmond Borough	5–2	Dorchester Town
10	Bishop's Stortford	0–1	Thurrock
11	Eastbourne Borough	3–0	Bognor Regis Town
12	Havant & Waterlooville	2–3	Lewes
13	Maidenhead United	1–2	Bromley
14	Newport County	3–2	Bath City
15	St Albans City	1–1	Braintree Town
St Albans won 5–4 on penalties
16	Welling United	2–1	Fisher Athletic

== Third round ==
The third round was contested by the 16 winners of the previous round. Matches were played in the week commencing 3 December 2007.

=== Northern Section ===
Tie no	Home team	Score	Away team
1	Kettering Town	2–4 (aet)	Hinckley United
2	Nuneaton Borough	4–2 (aet)	A.F.C. Telford United
3	Southport	2–3 (aet)	Barrow
4	Tamworth	3–1 (aet)	Harrogate Town

=== Southern Section ===
Tie no	Home team	Score	Away team
1	St Albans City	2–1	Thurrock
2	Eastbourne Borough	7–2	Lewes
3	Bromley	1–2 (aet)	Welling United
4	Hampton & Richmond Borough	2–1	Newport County

== Fourth round ==
The 24 Conference Premier teams joined the eight winners from the previous round. Matches were played in the week commencing 22 December 2007.

=== Northern Section ===
Tie no	Home team	Score	Away team	Attendance
1	Stafford Rangers	0–2 (aet)	York City	515
2	Histon	1–2	Halifax Town	231
3	Cambridge United	0–1	Rushden & Diamonds	1,309
4	Nuneaton Borough	2–1	Altrincham	533
5	Hinckley United	1–2	Kidderminster Harriers	474
6	Droylsden	2–1 (aet)	Farsley Celtic	224
7	Barrow	0–2	Northwich Victoria	708
8	Burton Albion	2–1	Tamworth	1,152

=== Southern Section ===
Tie no	Home team	Score	Away team	Attendance
1	Welling United	1–3	Grays Athletic	261
2	Woking	2–1	Stevenage Borough	830
3	Aldershot Town	1–0	Oxford United	1,573
4	Salisbury City	1–2	Weymouth	667
5	Hampton & Richmond Borough	0–1	Forest Green Rovers	344
6	Eastbourne Borough	1–2	Crawley Town	552
7	St Albans City	2–0	Torquay United	454
8	Exeter City	2–3 (aet)	Ebbsfleet United	1,009

== Fifth round ==
Matches were played in the week commencing 4 February 2008.

=== Northern Section ===
Tie no	Home team	Score	Away team	Attendance
1	Droylsden	0–2	Burton Albion	172
2	Nuneaton Borough	0–1	Halifax Town	469
3	York City	3–3 (aet)	Northwich Victoria	763
Northwich Victoria won 3–2 on penalties
4	Kidderminster Harriers	1–3	Rushden & Diamonds	739

=== Southern Section ===
Tie no	Home team	Score	Away team	Attendance
1	Weymouth	4–0	Ebbsfleet United	508
2	Woking	1–0	Forest Green Rovers	725
3	Crawley Town	4–0	Grays Athletic	564
4	St Albans City	0–4	Aldershot Town	375

== Quarter-finals ==
Matches were played in the week commencing 26 February 2008.

=== Northern Section ===
Tie no	Home team	Score	Away team	Attendance
1	Northwich Victoria	0–4	Rushden & Diamonds	495
2	Halifax Town	3–1	Burton Albion	632

=== Southern Section ===
Tie no	Home team	Score	Away team	Attendance
1	Woking	3–0	Weymouth	690
2	Crawley Town	2–6 (aet)	Aldershot Town	827

== Semi-finals ==
Matches were played in the week commencing 18 March 2008.

=== Northern Section ===
Tie no	Home team	Score	Away team	Attendance
1	Rushden & Diamonds	1–0	Halifax Town	880

=== Southern Section ===
Tie no	Home team	Score	Away team	Attendance
1	Aldershot Town	2–2 (aet)	Woking	1629
Aldershot Town won 4–3 on penalties

== Final ==
Tie no	Home team	Score	Away team	Attendance
1	Aldershot Town	3–3 (aet)	Rushden & Diamonds	3,718
Aldershot Town won 4–3 on penalties

3 April 2008
19:45 BST

Aldershot Town	3–3 (a.e.t.)	Rushden & Diamonds
Mendes 71'; Hudson 94'; Donnelly 107'		Burgess 73'; Burgess 109'; Rankine 120+1'
Penalties
	4–3

Recreation Ground, Aldershot
Attendance: 3,718
