= Wesley Ngo Baheng =

French footballer (born 1989)

Personal information
- Date of birth: 23 September 1989 (age 37)
- Place of birth: Le Blanc-Mesnil, Seine-Saint-Denis, France
- Height: 6 ft 1 in (1.85 m)
- Position: Forward

Youth career
- 1997–2000: Le Blanc-Mesnil
- 2000–2007: Le Havre

Senior career*
Years	Team	Apps	(Gls)
2007–2010	Newcastle United	0	(0)
2010–2011	Aldershot Town	3	(0)
2011	Hereford United	2	(0)
2011–2012	Le Blanc-Mesnil	18	(7)
2012–2014	FC Dieppe	25	(9)
2014–2015	UJA Alfortville	15	(6)
2015–2016	Le Blanc-Mesnil		
- * Club domestic league appearances and goals

Wesley Ngo Baheng (born 23 September 1989) is a French footballer who plays for UJA Alfortville.

== Biography ==
Ngo Baheng began playing at the youth system of Le Havre, and was offered a contract with Newcastle United in January 2008. He accepted but spent 18 months out of football due to a cruciate ligament injury. After a deal with 1. FC Nürnberg fell through, in the early weeks of the 2010–11 season, Ngo Baheng had trials at Amiens, Faro, Mechelen and Gateshead, but eventually signed for Aldershot Town on a short-term deal. He made his professional debut as a substitute in the 2–0 defeat in the FA Cup match against Dover Athletic on 27 November 2010. Ngo Baheng was released by new Aldershot manager, Dean Holdsworth at the end of his short-term contract on 19 January 2011. On 28 January 2011, he signed a week-to-week contract with Hereford United, he left the club in March 2011. After a difficult season in Blanc-Mesnil, and coming back from injury, in June 2012, Ngo Baheng signed a contract federal to FC Dieppe.

== Music ==
Ngo Baheng has also experimented with rap, recording several tracks under the alias F-ikass which is a diminutive of the French word efficace which directly translates to effective in English. In 2010, he produced a music video with local Newcastle R&B singer Kallum Campbell – titled "Tiddies on a Sunday". He has a publishing company and events company with his manager Sasha Huet Baranov.

He also featured on Kallum Campbells debut album 'Burberry Slippers', appearing on the track 'packet dropper'.

== Club stats ==
As of 15 April 2011.

Club Performance
Club	Season	League		FA Cup		League Cup		Other		Total
Club	Season	App	Goals	App	Goals	App	Goals	App	Goals	App	Goals
Newcastle United	2008–09	0	0	0	0	0	0	0	0	0	0
Newcastle United	2009–10	0	0	0	0	0	0	0	0	0	0
Aldershot Town	2010–11	3	0	1	0	0	0	0	0	4	0
Hereford United	2010–11	2	0	0	0	0	0	0	0	2	0
Total		5	0	1	0	0	0	0	0	6	0
