= Andy Sandell =

English footballer (born 1983)

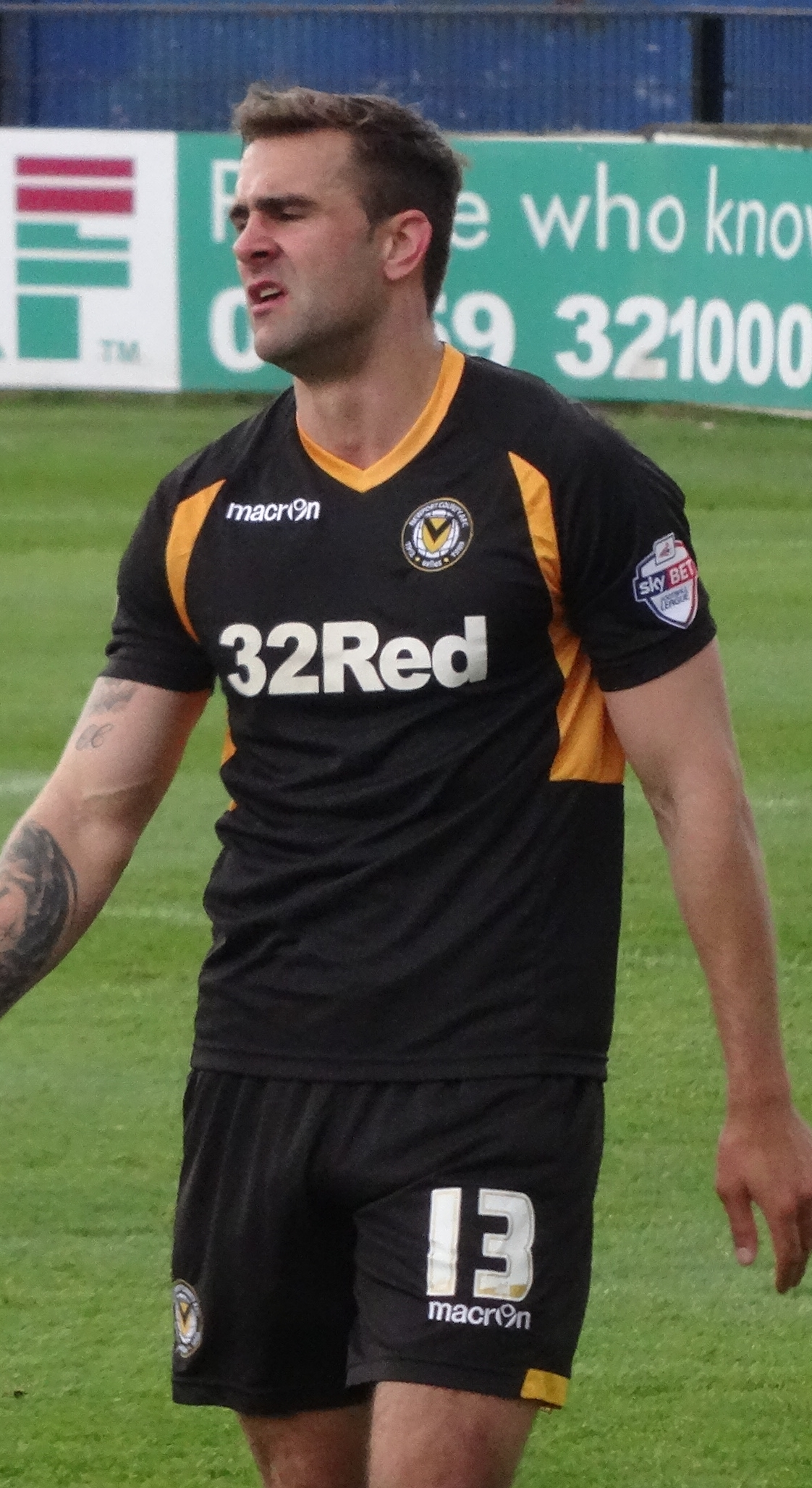
- Sandell playing for Newport County in 2014

Personal information
- Full name: Andrew Charles Sandell
- Date of birth: 8 September 1983 (age 43)
- Place of birth: Calne, England
- Height: 1.80 m (5 ft 11 in)
- Positions: Striker; left back; left winger

Youth career
- 1999–2000: Forest Green Rovers
- 2000–2002: Bristol City

Senior career*
| Years | Team | Apps | (Gls) |
- Malmesbury Victoria
- Melksham Town
| 2004–2005 | Paulton Rovers | | |
| 2005–2007 | Bath City | 46 | (8) |
| 2006–2007 | Bristol Rovers | 36 | (3) |
| 2007–2009 | Salisbury City | 49 | (8) |
| 2008–2009 | → Aldershot Town (loan) | 7 | (1) |
| 2009–2010 | Aldershot Town | 52 | (6) |
| 2010–2011 | Wycombe Wanderers | 43 | (7) |
| 2011 | → Forest Green Rovers (loan) | 3 | (0) |
| 2011–2012 | Chippenham Town | 5 | (0) |
| 2012–2015 | Newport County | 113 | (14) |
| 2015–2018 | Chippenham Town | 106 | (61) |
| 2018–2020 | Melksham Town | 2 | (1) |
| 2020– | Paulton Rovers | 5 | (0) |
- * Club domestic league appearances and goals as of 13:13, 20 August 2021 (UTC)

Andrew Charles Sandell (born 8 September 1983) is an English professional footballer who plays as a striker after a professional career as a left sided defender or midfielder.

== Career ==
=== Trainee and non-League football ===
Sandell began his career as a trainee at Bristol City after coming through the youth system at Forest Green Rovers. Spells at Malmesbury Victoria and Melksham Town followed before he moved to Western League Premier Division side Paulton Rovers. He then joined Bath City for £1,500 and he was then offered a trial at Swansea City at the end of 2005. In the 2005–06 season he scored eight goals for Bath City, as they finished as runners-up, in the Southern Football League Premier Division. They went on to lose the subsequent play-off semi-final to Bedford Town.

=== Bristol Rovers ===
In the summer of 2006, Sandell joined Bristol Rovers and made his Football League debut at Peterborough United on the opening day of the season. That season Bristol Rovers reached the League Two Play-off Final, where they beat Shrewsbury Town 3–1. Bristol Rovers also reached the Football League Trophy final, which they lost 3–2 to Doncaster Rovers.

=== Salisbury City ===
In August 2007, Sandell joined Salisbury City on a month's loan from Bristol Rovers, with the move eventually made permanent. He scored three goals throughout the season. In the 2008–09 season Sandell played 16 games for Salisbury City and scored five times.

=== Aldershot Town ===
In November 2008, Sandell joined Aldershot Town on loan until January. The move was made permanent when the transfer window opened and Sandell signed a contract until the end of the 2009–10 season.

=== Wycombe Wanderers ===
Sandell joined Wycombe Wanderers upon expiry of his contract in June 2010, penning a two-year deal. In his first season for the club he gained the reputation of a free kick specialist, scoring 5 times from set pieces in the 2010–11 season.

On 10 October 2011, Sandell signed for Forest Green Rovers in a three-month loan deal, returning to the club where he was a member of the under 18's squad over a decade before. Sandell made his Forest Green debut the next day in an away loss against Hayes & Yeading United. Sandell went on to make further appearances against AFC Telford United and Kettering Town for Forest Green until his loan contract was terminated early following an incident at the club. Sandell subsequently returned to Wycombe but was however released on 7 November 2011.

=== Chippenham Town ===
On 10 November 2011, Sandell joined Chippenham Town so that he could get back to match fitness to look for a new Football League club in the January transfer window.

In December 2011, Sandell reached the final stages of an open try out at Major League Soccer outfit Chicago Fire.

=== Newport County ===
On 6 January 2012 Sandell joined Conference National club Newport County. Sandell made his Newport debut the following day in a 2–0 loss against Luton Town. He then agreed a new contract with the club to remain at Newport for the 2012–13 season in June 2012. In the 2012–13 season he was part of the Newport team that finished 3rd in the league, reaching the Conference National playoffs. Newport County won the playoff final versus Wrexham at Wembley stadium 2–0 to return to the Football League after a 25-year absence with promotion to League Two.

He was released by Newport in May 2015 at the end of his contract.

=== Chippenham Town ===
In July 2015, Sandell signed for Chippenham Town as a forward. In August it was also announced that Andy would take the vacant Commercial Manager role at the club.

At the end of the 2015/16 season, Sandell was awarded the Southern League Premier Division Golden Boot after scoring the most goals in the league, 22 in total.

In the 2016/17 season, Sandell helped Chippenham to win the Southern League Premier Division. He was once again awarded the Southern League Premier Division Golden Boot after scoring 27 goals in the league.

Sandell left Chippenham Town in December 2018 to recover from an ACL Injury.

=== Later career ===
Sandell had spells at both Melksham Town and Paulton Rovers, taking up a player-coach role at the latter.

== Career statistics ==
As of match played 2 December 2017

Appearances and goals by club, season and competition
| Club | Season | League | | | FA Cup | | League Cup | | Other | | Total | |
| Club | Season | Division | Apps | Goals | Apps | Goals | Apps | Goals | Apps | Goals | Apps | Goals |
|---|---|---|---|---|---|---|---|---|---|---|---|---|
| Bath City | 2005–06 | SFL - Premier Division | 46 | 8 | 0 | 0 | — | | 0 | 0 | 46 | 8 |
| Bristol Rovers | 2006–07 | League Two | 36 | 3 | 4 | 0 | 1 | 0 | 7 (Note: Appearance(s) in Football League Trophy) | 0 | 48 | 3 |
| Salisbury City | 2007–08 | Conference Premier | 33 | 3 | 0 | 0 | — | | 1 (Note: Appearances in the FA Trophy) | 0 | 34 | 3 |
| Salisbury City | 2008–09 | Conference Premier | 16 | 5 | 0 | 0 | — | | 0 | 0 | 16 | 5 |
| Salisbury City | Total | | 49 | 8 | 0 | 0 | 0 | 0 | 1 | 0 | 50 | 8 |
| Aldershot Town (loan) | 2008–09 | League Two | 7 | 1 | 0 | 0 | 0 | 0 | 0 | 0 | 7 | 1 |
| Aldershot Town | 2008–09 | League Two | 22 | 1 | 0 | 0 | 0 | 0 | 0 | 0 | 22 | 1 |
| Aldershot Town | 2009–10 | League Two | 30 | 5 | 3 | 0 | 1 | 0 | 0 | 0 | 34 | 5 |
| Aldershot Town | Total | | 52 | 6 | 3 | 0 | 1 | 0 | 0 | 0 | 56 | 6 |
| Wycombe Wanderers | 2010–11 | League Two | 32 | 7 | 3 | 0 | 1 | 0 | 1 | 0 | 37 | 7 |
| Wycombe Wanderers | 2011–12 | League One | 11 | 0 | 0 | 0 | 1 | 0 | 1 | 0 | 13 | 0 |
| Wycombe Wanderers | Total | | 43 | 7 | 3 | 0 | 2 | 0 | 2 | 0 | 50 | 7 |
| Forest Green Rovers (loan) | 2011–12 | Conference Premier | 3 | 0 | 0 | 0 | — | | 0 | 0 | 3 | 0 |
| Chippenham Town | 2011–12 | SFL - Premier Division | 5 | 0 | 0 | 0 | — | | 3 | 0 | 8 | 0 |
| Newport County | 2011–12 | Conference Premier | 10 | 2 | 0 | 0 | — | | 0 | 0 | 10 | 2 |
| Newport County | 2012–13 | Conference Premier | 42 | 8 | 0 | 0 | — | | 3 (Note: Appearances in the Conference Premier play-offs) | 0 | 45 | 8 |
| Newport County | 2013–14 | League Two | 23 | 3 | 1 | 0 | 2 | 0 | 1 | 0 | 27 | 3 |
| Newport County | 2014–15 | League Two | 38 | 1 | 0 | 0 | 0 | 0 | 1 | 0 | 39 | 1 |
| Newport County | Total | | 113 | 14 | 1 | 0 | 2 | 0 | 5 | 0 | 121 | 14 |
| Chippenham Town | 2015–16 | SFL - Premier Division | 33 | 22 | 3 | 1 | — | | 2 (Note: One appearance in the FA Trophy; one appearance and a goal in the Southern League Cup) | 1 | 38 | 24 |
| Chippenham Town | 2016–17 | SFL - Premier Division | 40 | 27 | 3 | 5 | — | | 3 (Note: One appearance and a goal in the Wiltshire Premier Shield; one appearance in the FA Trophy; one appearance in the Wiltshire Senior Cup) | 1 | 46 | 33 |
| Chippenham Town | 2017–18 | National League South | 14 | 4 | 0 | 0 | — | | 0 | 0 | 14 | 4 |
| Chippenham Town | Total | | 87 | 53 | 6 | 6 | 0 | 0 | 5 | 2 | 98 | 61 |
| Career total | | | 441 | 100 | 17 | 6 | 6 | 0 | 23 | 2 | 487 | 108 |

== Honours ==
Bristol Rovers

- Football League Two play-offs: 2007
- Football League Trophy runner-up: 2006–07
