= Darren Jones (footballer) =

Welsh footballer

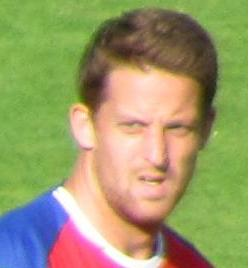
- Jones playing for Aldershot Town in 2010

Personal information
- Full name: Darren Lee Jones
- Date of birth: 26 August 1983 (age 43)
- Place of birth: Newport, Wales
- Height: 6 ft 1 in (1.85 m)
- Position: Defender

Team information
- Current team: Chepstow Town

Youth career
- –2000: Bristol City

Senior career*
Years	Team	Apps	(Gls)
2000–2004	Bristol City	2	(0)
2002–2003	→ Forest Green Rovers (loan)	15	(0)
2003	→ Cheltenham Town (loan)	14	(1)
2004–2005	Newport County	?	(?)
2006–2009	Forest Green Rovers	118	(7)
2009–2010	Hereford United	40	(3)
2010–2012	Aldershot Town	85	(1)
2012–2014	Shrewsbury Town	53	(1)
2014	AFC Wimbledon	18	(1)
2014–2015	Newport County	43	(4)
2015–2016	Forest Green Rovers	10	(0)
2016–2017	Newport County	48	(1)
2017	Bath City	9	(0)

Managerial career
- 2017: Chepstow Town
- * Club domestic league appearances and goals as of 21:53, 6 March 2018 (UTC)

Darren Lee Jones (born 26 August 1983) is a Welsh footballer who plays as a defender.

== Club career ==
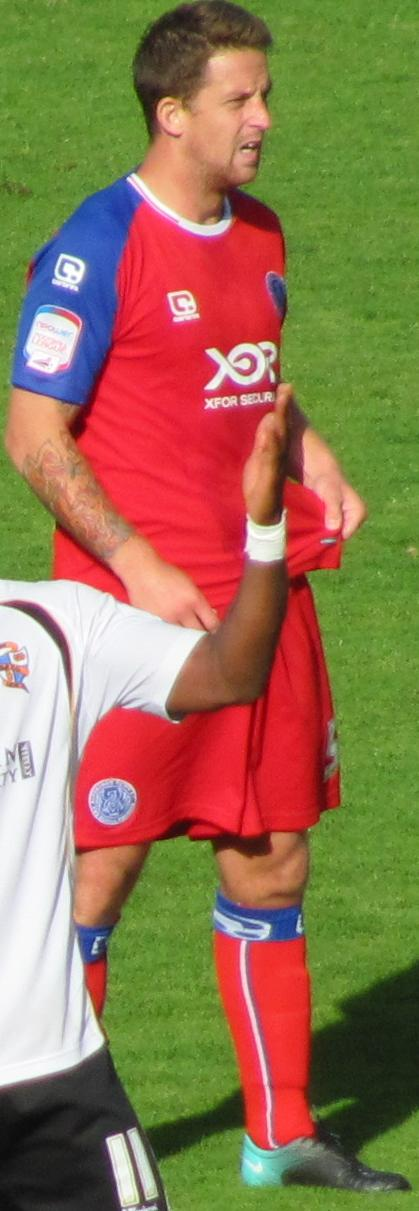
Jones in Aldershot colours.

Born in Newport, Wales, Jones began his career as a professional trainee for Bristol City, making one Football League appearance before joining Forest Green Rovers on loan in September 2002. He was then loaned to League Two side Cheltenham Town in 2003, where he made 14 league appearances.

He dropped down in to non-league football and signed for Newport County on a free transfer in early 2004. Jones and fellow Newport County footballer Andrew Thomas were jailed for two months for an assault outside a Newport nightclub in November 2005.

On his release from prison, Jones returned to Forest Green Rovers for a second spell in March 2006. Jones was a pivotal part in keeping Rovers in the Conference on his return to Forest Green and was a central part in the defence when Rovers recorded their highest ever finish in the 2007–08 season.

On 9 June 2009, it was confirmed that Darren had signed for recently relegated League Two side Hereford United for the 2009–10 season. In June 2010 Jones moved on again, joining fellow League Two side Aldershot Town.

In early June 2012, Aldershot confirmed that Jones had rejected their offer of a new contract, instead choosing to sign for a "recently promoted League One side."

On 8 June 2012, Jones signed for Shrewsbury Town, having worked with manager Graham Turner before at Hereford. Despite two seasons captaining the Shots, he claimed the move to Shrewsbury was a "No Brainer". Jones made his debut for Shrewsbury as the League One newcomers lost 1–0 at Sheffield United.

Jones made 38 appearances for Shrewsbury in the 2012–13 season, scoring once against Coventry City, however his season ended prematurely after suffering a dislocated shoulder in an away match at Carlisle United in March 2013.

Jones was released by Shrewsbury in January 2014 and joined AFC Wimbledon.

On 20 May 2014 Jones re-signed for Newport County. He made his debut for Newport versus Wycombe Wanderers on 9 August 2014. He scored his first competitive goal for Newport in the 3–2 win versus Northampton Town on 13 September 2014. Jones was selected as Newport County's Player of the Year for the 2014–15 season. He was offered a new contract by Newport County in May 2015 but chose to move on.

On 15 May 2015, it was announced that he would be leaving Newport County, making a return to the Conference National with Forest Green Rovers on a one-year deal. He made his third debut for Forest Green in a 2–1 win over Bromley on 31 August 2015. Having made only 10 league appearances, it was revealed that he had left the club on 24 January 2016.

On 25 January 2016, he rejoined Newport County on a deal until the end of the 2015–16 season and in June 2016 he agreed a new contract until the end of 2016–17 season.

On 9 May 2017 Jones announced his retirement from full-time professional football at the end of the 2016–17 season. He subsequently joined Bath City and left Bath in October 2017.

== Managerial career ==
Darren joined Chepstow Town as manager in November 2017.

== International career ==
Jones played for Wales at youth level.
