= Mikhael Jaimez-Ruiz =

Venezuelan footballer (born 1984)

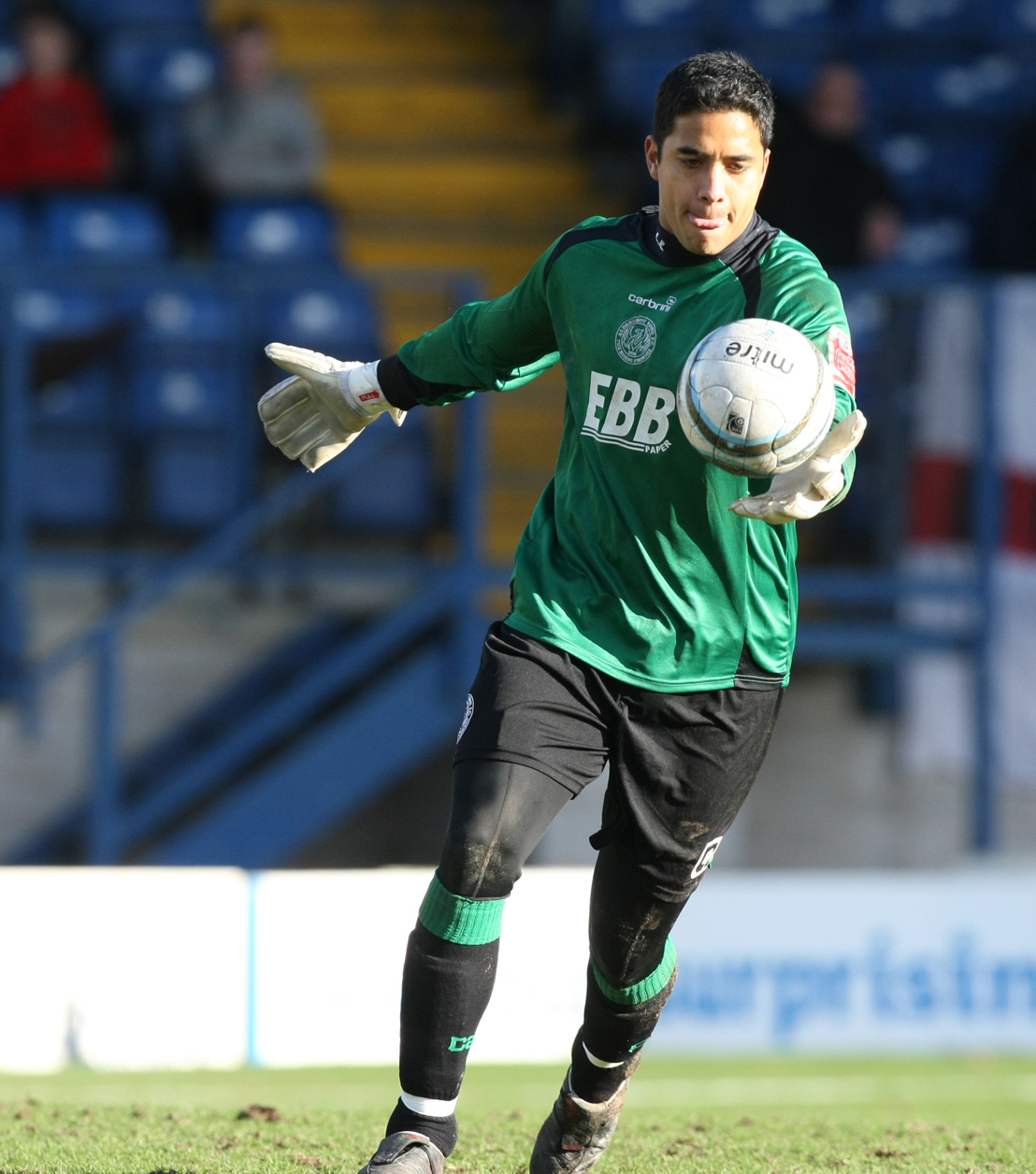
- Jaimez-Ruiz playing for Aldershot Town

Personal information
- Full name: Mikhael Aimar Jaimez-Ruiz
- Date of birth: 12 July 1984 (age 42)
- Place of birth: Mérida, Venezuela
- Height: 6 ft 1 in (1.85 m)
- Position: Goalkeeper

College career
Years	Team	Apps	(Gls)
- Graceland Yellowjackets
?–2003	St. Gregory's Cavaliers		

Senior career*
Years	Team	Apps	(Gls)
2003–2004	Olimpia Gherla	0	(0)
2004–2005	CFR Cluj	0	(0)
2005	→ FC Arieşul Turda (loan)	0	(0)
2006–2007	Barnet	0	(0)
2007	Northwood	11	(0)
2007–2010	Aldershot Town	49	(0)
2010–2011	Yaracuyanos	9	(0)
2011	Aldershot Town	0	(0)
2011	Hemel Hempstead Town	1	(0)
2011–2012	Dover Athletic	38	(0)
2012–2013	AFC Wimbledon	1	(0)
2013–2014	Hayes & Yeading United	28	(0)
2014	Wealdstone	1	(0)
2015	Royston Town	1	(0)
Total		139	(0)
- * Club domestic league appearances and goals

Mikhael Aimar Jaimez-Ruiz (born 12 July 1984) is a Venezuelan former professional footballer who played as a goalkeeper.

He started his senior career at Olimpia Gherla in 2003, and had spells at CFR Cluj, FC Arieşul Turda and Barnet before joining Northwood in 2007. He made eleven appearances at Northwood, but soon moved to Aldershot Town in 2007. During his three-year spell at Aldershot, he made 49 league appearances, before returning to his native Venezuela, when he joined Yaracuyanos FC in 2010, where he made 9 league appearances. He rejoined Aldershot Town in February 2011, but did not make a single appearance, and, after a one-off game for Hemel Hempstead Town, he joined Conference South side Dover Athletic on a free transfer in August 2011. He made 38 league appearances for the club, before switching to AFC Wimbledon in August 2012. However, he made just two appearances for AFC Wimbledon, and left the club in June 2013.

== Career ==
Jaimez-Ruiz finished his education in Venezuela and moved to the United States. He played university soccer for Graceland University and St. Gregory's University. In 2004, Jamiez-Ruiz moved to Romania and played for Olimpia Gherla, CFR Cluj and Arieşul Turda.

Jamiez-Ruiz moved to England and signed for Barnet on non-contract terms in 2006. He never played for Barnet and joined Northwood in early 2007.

He then joined Aldershot Town on non-contract terms in April 2007 and was an unused substitute goalkeeper in the last two Conference National league games of that season. In July 2007, Jaimez-Ruiz signed a full contract at Aldershot. He made three league appearances near the end of a season. He also played in the Conference League Cup Final, when Aldershot beat Rushden & Diamonds. He saved a penalty in extra time and again in the penalty shootout. He signed a new contract with Aldershot Town in the summer of 2008 and he made his Football League debut in October 2008 at home against Bury. Jamiez-Ruiz signed another one-year contract with Aldershot in May 2009 and following the departure of Nikki Bull in the summer of 2009 he became the first choice goalkeeper. In November 2009, he was awarded the Aldershot Player of the Month award for October.

He was released at the end of the 2009–10 season and joined Venezuelan club Yaracuyanos FC. In February 2011, Jaimez-Ruiz returned to Aldershot Town, but was released at the end of the season without making an appearance. He made a one-off appearance for Hemel Hempstead Town in a 1–1 draw against Leamington.

=== Dover Athletic ===
Jaimez-Ruiz signed for Conference South side Dover Athletic in August 2011. He was released at the end of the season.

=== AFC Wimbledon ===
Jaimez-Ruiz signed for AFC Wimbledon in League Two on 8 August 2012. He made his first appearance for the Dons in the First Round of the Football League Trophy on 4 September 2012, in a 2–1 loss to Southend United. Jaimez-Ruiz made his league début for AFC Wimbledon on 8 September 2012 against Northampton Town. On 21 June 2013, it was confirmed that Jaimez-Ruiz had been released by AFC Wimbledon due to the club's new goalkeeping structure for next season.

=== Hayes & Yeading United ===
On 17 August 2013, Jaimez-Ruiz signed for Conference South side Hayes & Yeading United, having played in a pre-season friendly for Phil Babb's side.
