= Reece Connolly =

English footballer

Personal information
- Full name: Reece William Connolly
- Date of birth: 22 January 1992 (age 34)
- Place of birth: Frimley, England
- Position: Striker

Team information
- Current team: Crowborough Athletic

Youth career
- 2008–2009: Aldershot Town

Senior career*
Years	Team	Apps	(Gls)
2009–2012	Aldershot Town	13	(0)
2010	→ Salisbury City (loan)	11	(2)
2011	→ Didcot Town (loan)	10	(1)
2011	→ Dorchester Town (loan)	13	(4)
2011–2012	→ Farnborough (loan)	27	(12)
2012	→ Farnborough (loan)	31	(14)
2012–2013	Farnborough	9	(2)
2013	→ Forest Green Rovers (loan)	7	(1)
2014	Eastleigh	13	(3)
2016	Basingstoke Town	10	(1)
2016–2017	Whitehawk	11	(2)
2017	Margate	3	(0)
2017–2017	Eastbourne Borough	8	(0)
2017–	Crowborough Athletic	3	(1)
- * Club domestic league appearances and goals as of 15:40, 29 August 2017 (UTC)

Reece William Connolly (born 22 January 1992) is an English footballer who plays as a striker for Crowborough Athletic in the Southern Counties East Premier Division.

== Playing career ==
=== Early career ===
Connolly started as a schoolboy at Crystal Palace before joining Aldershot Town. He was a first year scholar with Aldershot Town during the 2008–09 season and he made 14 reserve team appearances and was joint reserve team top scorer with four goals.

=== Aldershot Town ===
Connolly was an unused substitute for Aldershot's first team on three occasions near the end of 2008–09 season. On 18 August 2009, Connolly made his Football League and first team debut for Aldershot Town, when he came on as a substitute against Bournemouth at the Dean Court. His home debut was made a month later, when he came on as a substitute against Port Vale, at the Recreation Ground on 12 September 2009. On 28 January 2010, it was announced that Connolly was joining Conference National side Salisbury City on a month's loan deal. Connolly spent further time on loan with non-league club such as Didcot Town, Dorchester Town and Farnborough where he had two loan spells.

On 9 February 2012, Connolly signed a new one-year contract with Aldershot which included the possibility of a second year.

=== Farnborough ===
In December 2012, Farnborough made Connolly's loan a permanent move as they secured the striker for a club record fee of £12,000, as well as making him the highest paid player at the club. In an effort to reduce their wage bill Farnborough allowed Connolly to join Conference National side Forest Green Rovers on loan in March 2013 until the end of the season. Despite scoring on his debut on in a 2–0 away win against Ebbsfleet United, Connolly was not offered a full-time contract and returned to his parent club at the end of the season. It was reported that Connolly was struggling to come to terms with part-time football and in November 2013 he was suspended by Farnborough after failing a drugs test. His contract with the club was subsequently cancelled.

=== Eastleigh ===
Connolly signed non-contract terms with Eastleigh in January 2014 while waiting for an FA hearing into the issues at Farnborough. He scored three times in Eastleigh's run-in to the Conference South title, including the winner in the 1–0 home win over Chelmsford on 11 March. On 2 April 2014 Connolly was found guilty of drug use and banned from all football by the FA for six months.

=== Basingstoke Town ===
Connolly signed for National League South side Basingstoke Town in January 2016. He was released from his contract by mutual consent at the end of the season.

=== Whitehawk ===
Without a club at the start of the 2016–2017 season, Connolly became his former manager Richard Hill's first signing for Brighton-based National League South side Whitehawk. Connolly also played for Hill while on loan at Didcot Town from Aldershot. Connolly left The Hawks in January 2017, despite nine league and cup goals in 21 games, including a hat-trick at Lewes in a Sussex Senior Cup tie.

=== Eastbourne Borough ===
In March 2017, Connolly agreed to play for Eastbourne until the end of the season.

=== Crowborough Athletic ===
In August 2017, Connolly signed for Southern Counties East Premier Division club Crowborough Athletic. He made his debut in a FA Cup extra preliminary round against Lingfield, where he scored the opening goal in a 2–0 win at Maidstone United's Gallagher Stadium.

== Personal life ==
Connolly was educated at Frogmore Community College in Yateley, Hampshire.
