= Scott Donnelly (footballer) =

English footballer

Personal information
- Full name: Scott Paul Donnelly
- Date of birth: 25 December 1987 (age 38)
- Place of birth: Hammersmith, England
- Height: 1.73 m (5 ft 8 in)
- Position: Midfielder

Youth career
- –2014: Queens Park Rangers

Senior career*
Years	Team	Apps	(Gls)
2004–2007	Queens Park Rangers	13	(0)
2007	Wealdstone	14	(1)
2007–2010	Aldershot Town	71	(15)
2010–2012	Swansea City	1	(0)
2010–2011	→ Wycombe Wanderers (loan)	18	(3)
2011–2012	→ Wycombe Wanderers (loan)	18	(4)
2012	Aldershot Town	4	(0)
2012	→ Southend United (loan)	2	(0)
2013	Farnborough	3	(2)
2013	Newport County	18	(1)
2013–2014	Farnborough	20	(10)
2014–2016	Havant & Waterlooville	103	(31)
2016–2017	Margate	14	(0)
2017	→ Farnborough (loan)	10	(2)
2017	Farnborough	0	(0)
2017	Chippenham Town	8	(0)
2017–2019	Hayes & Yeading United	60	(26)
2019	Moneyfields		
2019–2021	Hayes & Yeading United	24	(5)
2021	Beaconsfield Town	19	(4)
2021–2022	Hayes & Yeading United	1	(0)

International career
2003	England U17	4	(1)

Managerial career
- 2024: Northwood
- * Club domestic league appearances and goals as of 23:54, 23 January 2020 (UTC)

Scott Paul Donnelly (born 25 December 1987) is an English former footballer who last managed Northwood. Donnelly previously coached at Rayners Lane.

== Career ==
Born in Hammersmith, Greater London, Donnelly had a promising start to his career, making his first league appearance for Queens Park Rangers at the age of 16 in October 2004 during a 2–1 defeat to Preston North End. A series of injuries set him back though and, despite signing a professional contract in 2006, he was released in January 2007.

Donnelly then played for non-League side Wealdstone and scored on his debut. In July 2007, had a successful trial and joined Aldershot Town. He was later handed a contract to keep him at the club until the end of the 2008–09 season, and scored the equaliser in a 1–1 draw with Exeter City that handed them promotion to the Football League. Donnelly also scored the Aldershot winner with a free kick in the team's first league game this season against Accrington Stanley, making him the first player to score for Aldershot in their second spell as a Football League club.

On 1 February 2010, it was reported that Donnelly was set to join Wycombe Wanderers on loan with a view to a permanent move.

On 23 June 2010, Donnelly agreed a move to Swansea City, penning a three-year deal with the EFL Championship outfit.

He made one appearance as an 81st-minute substitute during a 3–0 victory over Crystal Palace.

On 30 December 2010, Donnelly agreed a loan move to Wycombe Wanderers, the club he was linked with during the summer. His loan spell lasts until the end of the 2010–11 season. On 13 June 2011, it was announced that Donnelly would return on loan to Wycombe until the end of the 2011–12 season. He went on trial with Bradford City, featuring in their tour of Ireland 4–0 win against Wexford Youths. In September 2012, Donnelly joined Aldershot on a short-term contract. He made his debut on 29 September against York City. This was quickly followed by a short time on loan at Southend United in order to try an earn a permanent transfer. However this was unsuccessful and he then joined Farnborough of the Conference South in order to benefit from first team football and improve his fitness.

In January 2013 Donnelly signed for Newport County until the end of the 2012–13 season. Donnelly scored on his Newport debut after 30 seconds versus Tamworth on 9 February 2013. County eventually finished 3rd in the league, reaching the Conference National playoffs. Newport County won the playoff final versus Wrexham at Wembley Stadium 2–0 to return to the Football League after a 25-year absence with promotion to Football League Two. He was released by Newport County 10 May 2013.

In August 2013 Donnelly rejoined Farnborough on a non-contract basis.

In October 2017 he joined his current club Hayes & Yeading United, scoring 2 goals on his debut against Cambridge City. He left the club in the summer 2019 to join Moneyfields. However, he returned to Hayes & Yeading United again on 20 August 2019. In December 2021, he re-signed for Southern Football League Premier Division South side Hayes & Yeading United for a third time, having left divisional rivals Beaconsfield Town, for whom he had only signed for in the summer.

== Coaching career ==
After a spell coaching at Rayners Lane, in June 2024 Donnelly was named the new manager of Southern Football League Division One Central side Northwood. On 25 September 2024, Donnelly was sacked by the club following a 5-1 defeat to Berkhamsted that left the club sitting at the bottom of the division without a point from seven league matches.

== Career statistics ==
As of 24 November 2013.

Club	Season	League			FA Cup		League Cup		Other^{[A]}		Total	
Club	Season	Division	Apps	Goals	Apps	Goals	Apps	Goals	Apps	Goals	Apps	Goals
Queens Park Rangers	2004–05	Championship	2	0	0	0	0	0	0	0	2	0
Queens Park Rangers	2005–06	Championship	8	0	1	0	0	0	0	0	9	0
Queens Park Rangers	2006–07	Championship	3	0	0	0	0	0	0	0	3	0
Queens Park Rangers	Total		13	0	1	0	0	0	0	0	14	0
Aldershot Town	2007–08	Conference Premier	8	1	0	0	—		3	2	11	3
Aldershot Town	2008–09	League Two	20	1	0	0	1	0	1	0	22	1
Aldershot Town	2009–10	League Two	45	13	3	1	1	0	1	0	50	14
Aldershot Town	Total		73	15	3	1	2	0	5	2	83	18
Swansea City	2010–11	Championship	1	0	0	0	1	0	0	0	2	0
Swansea City	2011–12	Premier League	0	0	0	0	0	0	0	0	0	0
Swansea City	Total		1	0	0	0	1	0	0	0	2	0
Wycombe Wanderers (loan)	2010–11	League Two	18	3	1	0	0	0	0	0	19	3
Wycombe Wanderers (loan)	2011–12	League One	18	4	1	0	1	1	1	0	21	5
Aldershot Town	2012–13	League Two	4	0	1	0	0	0	1	0	6	0
Southend United (loan)	2012–13	League Two	2	0	0	0	0	0	0	0	2	0
Farnborough	2012–13	Conference South	3	2	0	0	—		0	0	3	2
Newport County	2012–13	Conference Premier	18	1	0	0	—		0	0	18	1
Farnborough	2013–14	Conference South	15	9	2	0	—		2	0	19	9
Career total			165	34	9	1	4	1	9	2	187	38

A. The "Other" column constitutes appearances and goals (including substitutes) in the EFL Trophy and Conference League Cup.

== Family ==
His sister Stacey Tracey Donnelly plays for the U17 Republic of Ireland women's national football team that reached the 2010 UEFA U-17 Women's Championship Final .

== Honours ==
Aldershot Town

- Conference League Cup: 2008

Newport County

- Conference National play-off winner: 2013
