= 2011–12 Aldershot Town F.C. season =

Aldershot Town F.C.
2011–12 season
- Chairman: Kris Machala
- Manager: Dean Holdsworth
- Stadium: Recreation Ground
- Football League Two: 11th
- FA Cup: 2nd Round (Eliminated by Sheffield Wednesday)
- Football League Cup: 4th Round (Eliminated by Manchester United)
- Football League Trophy: 2nd Round (Eliminated by Oxford United)
- Top goalscorer: League: Danny Hylton – 13; All: Danny Hylton – 16
- Highest home attendance: 7,044 (vs. Manchester United 25 October 2011)
- Lowest home attendance: 1,429 (vs. Oxford United 4 October 2011)
- Average home league attendance: 2,953

During the 2011–12 season, the English football club Aldershot Town F.C. was placed 11th in the Football League Two. The team reached the 4th round of the Football League Cup.

== League table ==
Pos	Team	Pld	W	D	L	GF	GA	GD	Pts
9	Oxford United	46	17	17	12	59	48	+11	68
10	Rotherham United	46	18	13	15	67	63	+4	67
11	Aldershot Town	46	19	9	18	54	52	+2	66
12	Port Vale	46	20	9	17	68	60	+8	59 (Note: On 9 March Port Vale were deducted ten points for entering administration.)
13	Bristol Rovers	46	15	12	19	60	70	−10	57

Updated to match(es) played on 5 May 2012. Source: BBC Sport
Rules for classification: 1) Points; 2) Goal difference; 3) Number of goals scored

== Squad ==
Note: Flags indicate national team as defined under FIFA eligibility rules; some limited exceptions apply. Players may hold more than one non-FIFA nationality.

No.	Pos.	Nation	Player
1	GK	ENG	Jamie Young
2	DF	ENG	Ben Herd
3	MF	GRN	Anthony Straker
4	MF	ENG	Luke Guttridge
5	DF	WAL	Darren Jones
6	DF	ENG	Aaron Brown
7	MF	ENG	Jermaine McGlashan
8	MF	ENG	Jamie Collins
9	FW	ENG	Michael Rankine
10	FW	ENG	Danny Hylton
11	MF	ENG	Alex Rodman
12	FW	GRN	Bradley Bubb
14	MF	WAL	Anthony Pulis
15	DF	WAL	Aaron Morris
16	MF	ENG	Graeme Montgomery
16	MF	IRL	Darren Murphy (on loan from Stevenage)
17	MF	ENG	Adam Mekki
18	DF	SWE	Doug Bergqvist
19	DF	ENG	Reece Connolly
20	MF	WAL	Jake Taylor (on loan from Reading)
21	GK	ENG	Ross Worner
22	DF	NOR	Henrik Breimyr
23	MF	ENG	Peter Vincenti

No.	Pos.	Nation	Player
24	DF	ENG	Jordan Brown (on loan from West Ham United)
24	FW	ENG	Stefan Payne
25	MF	POR	Bruno Andrade (on loan from Queens Park Rangers)
25	MF	ENG	Ben Smith (on loan from Crawley Town)
26	MF	ENG	Adam Smith (on loan from Mansfield Town)
26	MF	ENG	Mark Molesley (on loan from Bournemouth)
27	FW	CMR	Guy Madjo
28	DF	WAL	Troy Brown (on loan from Rotherham United)
29	MF	ENG	Max Worsfold
30	MF	SCO	Manny Panther
31	GK	ENG	Jordan Clement
32	MF	WAL	Michael Doughty (on loan from Queens Park Rangers)
33	MF	IRL	Scott Davies (on loan from Crawley Town)
34	DF	ENG	Jamie Day (on loan from Crawley Town)
35	MF	ENG	Jordan Roberts
36	DF	ENG	Sonny Bradley (on loan from Hull City)
37	MF	ENG	Charlie Henry (on loan from Luton Town)
38	FW	ENG	Greg Pearson (on loan from Burton Albion)
38	FW	NAM	Wilko Risser
39	DF	SCO	Chris Doig
40	MF	ENG	Josh Payne
41	FW	IRL	Charlie Collins (on loan from Milton Keynes Dons)
42	MF	ENG	Rob Sinclair (on loan from Stevenage)
67	DF	ENG	Liam Shaw

- Note: Players listed in italics left the club before the end of the season.

== Transfers ==
Players transferred in
Date	Pos.	Name	Previous club	Fee	Ref.
12 May 2011	FW	(England) Michael Rankine	(England) York City	Free (Bosman)	
17 May 2011	DF	(England) Aaron Brown	(England) Leyton Orient	Free	
2 June 2011	DF	(England) Jamie Collins	(Wales) Newport County	Free	
2 June 2011	GK	(England) Ross Worner	(England) Charlton Athletic	Free	
1 July 2011	FW	(Grenada) Bradley Bubb	(England) Farnborough	Undisclosed	
1 August 2011	MF	(England) Graeme Montgomery	(England) Dagenham & Redbridge	Free	
1 August 2011	MF	(Wales) Anthony Pulis	(England) Southampton	Free	
8 December 2011	DF	(Scotland) Chris Doig	(Indonesia) Pelita Jaya	Free	
20 January 2012	FW	(Cameroon) Guy Madjo	(England) Stevenage	Undisclosed	
27 January 2012	FW	(England) Stefan Payne	(England) Gillingham	Free	
13 February 2012	FW	(Namibia) Wilko Risser	(Malta) Floriana	Free	
5 March 2012	MF	(England) Josh Payne	(England) Oxford United	Free	
25 May 2012	DF	(England) Anthony Tonkin	(England) Oxford United	Free	
Players loaned in
Date from	Pos.	Name	From	Date to	Ref.
29 July 2011	MF	(Wales) Jake Taylor	(England) Reading	August 2011	
31 August 2011	DF	(England) Jordan Brown	(England) West Ham United	31 September 2011	
29 September 2011	MF	(Portugal) Bruno Andrade	(England) Queens Park Rangers	29 October 2011	
7 October 2011	MF	(England) Adam Smith	(England) Mansfield Town	7 November 2011	
27 October 2011	MF	(Republic of Ireland) Scott Davies	(England) Crawley Town	7 January 2012	
16 November 2011	DF	(England) Jamie Day	(England) Crawley Town	7 January 2012	
23 November 2011	MF	(England) Adam Smith	(England) Mansfield Town	7 January 2012	
24 November 2011	FW	(England) Greg Pearson	(England) Burton Albion	7 January 2012	
24 November 2011	MF	(England) Charlie Henry	(England) Luton Town	22 January 2012	
6 January 2012	DF	(Wales) Troy Brown	(England) Rotherham United	End of Season	
6 January 2012	DF	(England) Sonny Bradley	(England) Hull City	7 April 2012	
12 January 2012	MF	(England) Josh Payne	(England) Oxford United	End of Season	
13 January 2012	FW	(Republic of Ireland) Charlie Collins	(England) Milton Keynes Dons	13 February 2012	
31 January 2012	MF	(England) Ben Smith	(England) Crawley Town	1 May 2012	
10 February 2012	MF	(Republic of Ireland) Darren Murphy	(England) Stevenage	10 March 2012	
5 March 2012	MF	(Wales) Michael Doughty	(England) Queens Park Rangers	5 April 2012	
13 March 2012	MF	(England) Rob Sinclair	(England) Stevenage	13 April 2012	
22 March 2012	MF	(England) Mark Molesley	(England) Bournemouth	End of season	
Players loaned out
18 July 2011	GK	(England) Jordan Clement	(England) Maidenhead United	End of season	
18 July 2011	MF	(England) Max Worsfold	(England) Maidenhead United	End of season	
28 July 2011	DF	(Sweden) Doug Bergqvist	(England) Farnborough	January 2012	
28 July 2011	FW	(England) Reece Connolly	(England) Farnborough	January 2012	
23 August 2011	DF	(Norway) Henrik Breimyr	(England) Eastleigh	23 October 2011	
September 2011	MF	(England) Graeme Montgomery	(England) Eastleigh	October 2011	
Players transferred out
Date	Pos.	Name	Subsequent club	Fee	Ref
20 January 2012	MF	(England) Jermaine McGlashan	(England) Cheltenham Town	Undisclosed	
31 January 2012	MF	(England) Jamie Collins	(England) Forest Green Rovers	Undisclosed	
Players released
Date	Pos.	Name	Subsequent club	Join date	Ref.
23 May 2011	MF	(England) Ben Harding	(England) Wycombe Wanderers	1 July 2011	
13 June 2011	MF	(England) John Halls	(England) Wycombe Wanderers	13 June 2011	
23 June 2011	FW	(England) Marvin Morgan	(England) Shrewsbury Town	1 July 2011	
24 June 2011	FW	(England) Damian Spencer	(England) Grimsby Town	24 June 2011	
1 July 2011	FW	(England) Tim Sills	(England) Basingstoke Town	1 July 2011	
1 July 2011	GK	(Venezuela) Mikhael Jaimez-Ruiz	(England) Hemel Hempstead Town	August 2011	
1 July 2011	FW	(England) Wade Small	(England) Lewes	August 2011	
1 July 2011	DF	(England) Clayton Fortune	Unattached		
1 July 2011	MF	(England) Jack Randall	Unattached		
22 December 2011	MF	(England) Graeme Montgomery	(England) Eastleigh	December 2011	
6 January 2012	MF	(Wales) Anthony Pulis	(United States) Orlando City	January 2012	
26 January 2012	MF	(England) Luke Guttridge	(England) Northampton Town	January 2012	
26 January 2012	MF	(Scotland) Chris Doig	(England) York City	2 February 2012	
30 January 2012	DF	(England) Aaron Brown	(England) Preston North End	4 February 2012	
22 February 2012	FW	(England) Stefan Payne	(England) Sutton United	22 February 2012	
29 March 2012	MF	(Scotland) Manny Panther	Unattached		

== Squad statistics ==
=== Appearances and goals ===
As of 5 May 2012

No.	Pos	Nat	Player	Total		League Two		FA Cup		League Cup		JP Trophy	
No.	Pos	Nat	Player	Apps	Goals	Apps	Goals	Apps	Goals	Apps	Goals	Apps	Goals
1	GK	(England) ENG	Jamie Young	30	0	24+1	0	3+0	0	1+0	0	1+0	0
2	DF	(England) ENG	Ben Herd	53	0	45+0	0	3+0	0	4+0	0	1+0	0
3	MF	(Grenada) GRN	Anthony Straker	51	2	44+0	2	3+0	0	3+0	0	1+0	0
4	MF	(England) ENG	Luke Guttridge	33	6	24+1	4	3+0	1	4+0	1	0+1	0
5	DF	(Wales) WAL	Darren Jones	50	0	42+0	0	3+0	0	4+0	0	1+0	0
6	DF	(England) ENG	Aaron Brown	12	0	6+4	0	1+0	0	0+0	0	1+0	0
7	MF	(England) ENG	Jermaine McGlashan	31	4	18+5	4	2+1	0	2+2	0	0+1	0
8	MF	(England) ENG	Jamie Collins	33	0	21+4	0	3+0	0	3+1	0	1+0	0
9	FW	(England) ENG	Michael Rankine	30	5	21+1	2	2+1	1	3+1	2	0+1	0
10	FW	(England) ENG	Danny Hylton	52	16	43+1	13	2+1	0	4+0	2	1+0	1
11	MF	(England) ENG	Alex Rodman	26	2	15+3	1	2+1	1	4+0	0	1+0	0
12	FW	(Grenada) GRN	Bradley Bubb	11	0	1+8	0	0+1	0	0+1	0	0+0	0
14	MF	(Wales) WAL	Anthony Pulis	8	0	1+4	0	0+0	0	0+2	0	1+0	0
15	DF	(Wales) WAL	Aaron Morris	45	2	36+3	2	2+0	0	4+0	0	0+0	0
16	MF	(England) ENG	Graeme Montgomery	0	0	0+0	0	0+0	0	0+0	0	0+0	0
16	MF	(Republic of Ireland) IRL	Darren Murphy	3	0	2+1	0	0+0	0	0+0	0	0+0	0
17	MF	(England) ENG	Adam Mekki	27	1	16+9	1	0+1	0	0+1	0	0+0	0
18	DF	(Sweden) SWE	Doug Bergqvist	2	0	0+2	0	0+0	0	0+0	0	0+0	0
19	FW	(England) ENG	Reece Connolly	7	0	1+6	0	0+0	0	0+0	0	0+0	0
20	MF	(Wales) WAL	Jake Taylor	4	0	0+3	0	0+0	0	1+0	0	0+0	0
21	GK	(England) ENG	Ross Worner	25	0	22+0	0	0+0	0	3+0	0	0+0	0
23	MF	(England) ENG	Peter Vincenti	49	6	33+9	6	1+1	0	3+1	0	1+0	0
24	DF	(England) ENG	Jordan Brown	5	0	2+2	0	0+0	0	1+0	0	0+0	0
24	FW	(England) ENG	Stefan Payne	1	0	0+1	0	0+0	0	0+0	0	0+0	0
25	MF	(Portugal) POR	Bruno Andrade	2	0	0+1	0	0+0	0	0+0	0	1+0	0
25	MF	(England) ENG	Ben Smith	8	0	3+5	0	0+0	0	0+0	0	0+0	0
26	MF	(England) ENG	Adam Smith	14	0	7+5	0	1+0	0	0+1	0	0+0	0
26	MF	(England) ENG	Mark Molesley	8	1	2+6	1	0+0	0	0+0	0	0+0	0
27	FW	(Cameroon) CMR	Guy Madjo	20	8	15+5	8	0+0	0	0+0	0	0+0	0
28	DF	(Wales) WAL	Troy Brown	17	2	14+3	2	0+0	0	0+0	0	0+0	0
30	MF	(Scotland) SCO	Manny Panther	1	0	0+1	0	0+0	0	0+0	0	0+0	0
32	MF	(Wales) WAL	Michael Doughty	5	0	2+3	0	0+0	0	0+0	0	0+0	0
33	MF	(Republic of Ireland) IRL	Scott Davies	11	1	3+5	1	2+1	0	0+0	0	0+0	0
34	DF	(England) ENG	Jamie Day	0	0	0+0	0	0+0	0	0+0	0	0+0	0
35	MF	(England) ENG	Jordan Roberts	4	0	1+3	0	0+0	0	0+0	0	0+0	0
36	DF	(England) ENG	Sonny Bradley	14	0	13+1	0	0+0	0	0+0	0	0+0	0
37	MF	(England) ENG	Charlie Henry	6	0	3+3	0	0+0	0	0+0	0	0+0	0
38	FW	(England) ENG	Greg Pearson	6	0	1+4	0	0+1	0	0+0	0	0+0	0
38	FW	(Namibia) NAM	Wilko Risser	16	3	8+8	3	0+0	0	0+0	0	0+0	0
39	DF	(Scotland) SCO	Chris Doig	2	0	2+0	0	0+0	0	0+0	0	0+0	0
40	MF	(England) ENG	Josh Payne	17	2	14+3	2	0+0	0	0+0	0	0+0	0
41	FW	(Republic of Ireland) IRL	Charlie Collins	1	0	0+1	0	0+0	0	0+0	0	0+0	0
42	MF	(England) ENG	Rob Sinclair	4	0	1+3	0	0+0	0	0+0	0	0+0	0

- Note: Does not include appearances and goals for the Aldershot Town vs Southend United match on 26 December 2011 which was abandoned at half-time due to floodlight failure.

=== Top scorers ===
Place	Position	Nation	Number	Name	League Two	FA Cup	League Cup	JP Trophy	Total
1	FW	(England)	10	Danny Hylton	13	0	2	1	16
2	FW	(Cameroon)	27	Guy Madjo	8	0	0	0	8
3	MF	(England)	23	Peter Vincenti	6	0	0	0	6
=	MF	(England)	4	Luke Guttridge	4	1	1	0	6
5	FW	(England)	9	Michael Rankine	2	1	2	0	5
6	MF	(England)	7	Jermaine McGlashan	4	0	0	0	4
7	FW	(Namibia)	38	Wilko Risser	3	0	0	0	3
8	MF	(Grenada)	3	Anthony Straker	2	0	0	0	2
=	MF	(England)	11	Alex Rodman	1	1	0	0	2
=	DF	(Wales)	15	Aaron Morris	2	0	0	0	2
=	MF	(England)	40	Josh Payne	2	0	0	0	2
=	DF	(Wales)	28	Troy Brown	2	0	0	0	2
13	MF	(Republic of Ireland)	33	Scott Davies	1	0	0	0	1
=	MF	(England)	17	Adam Mekki	1	0	0	0	1
=	MF	(England)	26	Mark Molesley	1	0	0	0	1
				TOTALS	52	3	5	1	61

=== Disciplinary record ===
Number	Nation	Position	Name	League Two		FA Cup		League Cup		JP Trophy		Total	
Number	Nation	Position	Name	Yellow card	Red card	Yellow card	Red card	Yellow card	Red card	Yellow card	Red card	Yellow card	Red card
3	(Grenada)	DF	Anthony Straker	3	1	0	0	0	0	0	0	3	1
28	(Wales)	DF	Troy Brown	1	1	0	0	0	0	0	0	1	1
35	(England)	MF	Jordan Roberts	1	1	0	0	0	0	0	0	2	1
21	(England)	GK	Ross Worner	0	1	0	0	0	0	0	0	0	1
10	(England)	FW	Danny Hylton	9	0	0	0	0	0	0	0	9	0
2	(England)	DF	Ben Herd	7	0	0	0	1	0	0	0	8	0
5	(Wales)	DF	Darren Jones	6	0	0	0	0	0	0	0	6	0
23	(England)	MF	Peter Vincenti	6	0	0	0	0	0	0	0	6	0
8	(England)	MF	Jamie Collins	4	0	1	0	0	0	0	0	5	0
40	(England)	MF	Josh Payne	5	0	0	0	0	0	0	0	5	0
9	(England)	FW	Michael Rankine	3	0	1	0	0	0	0	0	4	0
7	(England)	MF	Jermaine McGlashan	3	0	0	0	0	0	0	0	3	0
36	(England)	DF	Sonny Bradley	3	0	0	0	0	0	0	0	3	0
17	(England)	MF	Adam Mekki	2	0	0	0	0	0	0	0	2	0
15	(Wales)	DF	Aaron Morris	2	0	0	0	0	0	0	0	2	0
4	(England)	MF	Luke Guttridge	0	0	0	0	1	0	0	0	1	0
38	(England)	FW	Greg Pearson	1	0	0	0	0	0	0	0	1	0
26	(England)	MF	Adam Smith	1	0	0	0	0	0	0	0	1	0
32	(Wales)	MF	Michael Doughty	1	0	0	0	0	0	0	0	1	0
1	(England)	GK	Jamie Young	1	0	0	0	0	0	0	0	1	0
33	(Republic of Ireland)	MF	Scott Davies	0	0	0	0	1	0	0	0	1	0
26	(England)	MF	Mark Molesley	1	0	0	0	0	0	0	0	1	0
19	(England)	FW	Reece Connolly	1	0	0	0	0	0	0	0	1	0
			TOTALS	61	4	2	0	3	0	0	0	66	4

== Results ==
=== Pre-season friendlies ===
10 July 2011	Farnborough	0–4	Aldershot Town	Rushmoor Stadium
15:00			Brown 13'; Trialist 51'; Connolly 80'; Mekki 85'	Attendance: 1,017

12 July 2011	Tamworth	1–3	Aldershot Town	The Lamb Ground
19:45	Smith 21'		Trialist 48', 55'; Vincenti 90'	Attendance: 558

16 July 2011	Aldershot Town	1–1	Inverness Caledonian Thistle	Recreation Ground
15:00	Rodman 18'		Ross 65'	Attendance: 877

20 July 2011	Aldershot Town	1–1	Charlton Athletic	Recreation Ground
19:45	Guttridge 66'		Benson 46'	Attendance: 846

23 July 2011	Aldershot Town	1–0	Stoke City	Recreation Ground
15:00	Mekki 81'			Attendance: 1684

30 July 2011	Aldershot Town	1–2	Brentford	Recreation Ground
15:00	Rankine 32' (pen.)		Alexander 38' (pen.); MacDonald 76'	Attendance: 1,147

=== League Two ===
==== Results summary ====
Overall								Home						Away					
Pld	W	D	L	GF	GA	GD	Pts	W	D	L	GF	GA	GD	W	D	L	GF	GA	GD
46	19	9	18	54	52	+2	66	11	5	7	26	19	+7	8	4	11	28	33	−5

Source: https://www.bbc.co.uk/sport/football/tables

==== Results by round ====
Round	1	2	3	4	5	6	7	8	9	10	11	12	13	14	15	16	17	18	19	20	21	22	23	24	25	26	27	28	29	30	31	32	33	34	35	36	37	38	39	40	41	42	43	44	45	46
Ground	A	H	H	A	A	H	H	A	A	H	A	H	A	A	H	H	A	H	A	H	A	H	H	A	H	A	H	A	H	A	H	A	H	H	A	A	H	A	H	A	H	A	H	A	H	A
Result	W	L	L	L	D	W	D	W	W	L	L	L	L	W	W	W	L	L	L	W	L	D	L	L	L	D	W	W	W	W	W	W	L	L	D	W	W	W	D	L	L	D	W	W	D	D
Position	3	12	18	20	20	19	18	14	11	15	17	18	19	15	16	13	15	15	16	14	16	16	16	16	17	19	18	17	15	15	13	12	13	13	12	12	11	10	10	11	11	11	11	11	11	11

Source: BBC Sport
A = Away; H = Home; W = Win; D = Draw; L = Loss

==== Results ====
6 August 2011	Bradford City	1–2	Aldershot Town	Bradford
15:00	Hanson 90+3'; Flynn (yellow card) 53'		18' Hylton; 38' (o.g.) Threlfall; (yellow card) 42' McGlashan; (yellow card) 60' Jones	Stadium: Valley Parade; Attendance: 10,205; Referee: Mark Heywood

13 August 2011	Aldershot Town	0–1	Northampton Town	Aldershot
15:00	Herd (yellow card) 75'		2' Westwood; (yellow card) 54' Corker; (yellow card) 74' Young	Stadium: Recreation Ground; Attendance: 2,790

16 August 2011	Aldershot Town	0–1	Torquay United	Aldershot
19:45			36' Mansell; (yellow card) 73' Morris	Stadium: Recreation Ground; Attendance: 2,236

20 August 2011	Morecambe	2–0	Aldershot Town	Morecambe
15:00	Ellison 8'; Alessandra 79'		(yellow card) 49' Vincenti; (yellow card) 90' Herd	Stadium: Globe Arena; Attendance: 1,833

27 August 2011	Oxford United	1–1	Aldershot Town	Oxford
15:00	Constable 21'; Potter (yellow card) 64'; Batt (yellow card) 71'		66' Guttridge; (red card) 12' Straker; (yellow card) 62' Vincenti	Stadium: Kassam Stadium; Attendance: 6,673

3 September 2011	Aldershot Town	1–0	Cheltenham Town	Aldershot
15:00	Hylton 72'			Stadium: Recreation Ground; Attendance: 2,755

10 September 2011	Aldershot Town	1–1	AFC Wimbledon	Aldershot
15:00	Hylton 90+4'		Porter 17'	Stadium: Recreation Ground; Attendance: 4,110

13 September 2011	Hereford United	0–2	Aldershot Town	Hereford
19:45			Rankine 19'; Vincenti 82'	Stadium: Edgar Street; Attendance: 1,599

17 September 2011	Bristol Rovers	0–1	Aldershot Town	Horfield, Bristol
15:00	Carayol (yellow card) 79'		36' Rodman; (yellow card) 64' Hylton; (yellow card) 90' Herd	Stadium: Memorial Stadium; Attendance: 5,640

24 September 2011	Aldershot Town	0–1	Crawley Town	Aldershot
15:00	Jones (yellow card) 77'; McGlashan (yellow card) 90'		64' Doughty; (yellow card) 19' Hunt; (yellow card) 45' Torres; (yellow card) 67' Davies	Stadium: Recreation Ground; Attendance: 3,276

1 October 2011	Accrington Stanley	3–2	Aldershot Town	Accrington
15:00	Hessey 11'; Coid 56'; Barnett 88'; Long (yellow card) 45'; Procter (yellow card) 81'		7', 24' Hylton; (yellow card) 32' Rankine; (yellow card) 34' McGlashan; (yellow card) 82' Hylton	Stadium: Crown Ground; Attendance: 1,438

8 October 2011	Aldershot Town	1–2	Macclesfield Town	Aldershot
15:00	Hylton 41'; Collins (yellow card) 85'		53' Donnelly; 73' Draper	Stadium: Recreation Ground; Attendance: 2,341

15 October 2011	Barnet	2–1	Aldershot Town	Barnet, Greater London
15:00	Kabba 63' (pen.); Holmes 79'; Marshall (yellow card) 32'; Borrowdale (yellow card) 90'		27' Hylton; (yellow card) 56' Jones	Stadium: Underhill Stadium; Attendance: 2,015

22 October 2011	Dagenham & Redbridge	2–5	Aldershot Town	Dagenham, Greater London
15:00	Nurse 43'; McCrory 80'; Arber (yellow card) 37'		3', 90' McGlashan; 6' Vincenti; 38' (pen.) Rankine; 45' Guttridge	Stadium: Victoria Road; Attendance: 1,796

29 October 2011	Aldershot Town	3–1	Crewe Alexandra	Aldershot
15:00	Hylton 23', 62'; McGlashan 48'; Vincenti (yellow card) 83'		30' Leitch-Smith; (yellow card) 90' Westwood	Stadium: Recreation Ground; Attendance: 2,552

1 November 2011	Aldershot Town	2–0	Burton Albion	Aldershot
19:45	McGlashan 38'; Guttridge 43'; Hylton (yellow card) 65'		(yellow card) 5' Webster; (yellow card) 33' James; (yellow card) 63' Moore; (yellow card) 90' McGrath	Stadium: Recreation Ground; Attendance: 3,713

5 November 2011	Rotherham United	2–0	Aldershot Town	Sheffield
15:00	Grabban 14'; Holroyd 41'; Foster (yellow card) 73'		(yellow card) 45' Rankine; (red card) 55' Worner; (yellow card) 89' Davies	Stadium: Don Valley Stadium; Attendance: 3,284

19 November 2011	Aldershot Town	1–2	Gillingham	Aldershot
15:00	Davies 81'; Straker (yellow card) 58'		7' Nouble; 36' Whelpdale; (yellow card) 35' Whelpdale	Stadium: Recreation Ground; Attendance: 3,449

26 November 2011	Swindon Town	2–0	Aldershot Town	Swindon
15:00	Jervis 52'; Jones 71' (o.g.)		(yellow card) 27' Collins; (yellow card) 80' Straker	Stadium: The County Ground; Attendance: 7,526

10 December 2011	Aldershot Town	1–0	Shrewsbury Town	Aldershot
15:00	Guttridge 67'; Hylton (yellow card) 57'; Rankine (yellow card) 90'		(yellow card) 54' Sharps; (yellow card) 58' Wroe; (yellow card) 76' Collins; (yellow card) 88' Jacobson; (yellow card) 90' Hurst	Stadium: Recreation Ground; Attendance: 2,384

17 December 2011	Port Vale	4–0	Aldershot Town	Burslem, Stoke-on-Trent
15:00	Madjo 8', 48', 60'; Rigg 83'; McDonald (yellow card) 74'; Collins (yellow card) 90'			Stadium: Vale Park; Attendance: 3,714

31 December 2011	Aldershot Town	0–0	Plymouth Argyle	Aldershot
15:00	Collins (yellow card) 84'; Pearson (yellow card) 90'		(yellow card) 18' Bhasera; (yellow card) 30' Hemmings; (yellow card) 67' Berry; (yellow card) 90' Chadwick	Stadium: Recreation Ground; Attendance: 3,886

2 January 2012	Gillingham	1–0	Aldershot Town	Gillingham
15:00	Jackman 46'; Martin (yellow card) 61' (yellow-red card)		(yellow card) 74' Smith	Stadium: Priestfield Stadium; Attendance: 5,432

7 January 2012	Aldershot Town	0–3	Oxford United	Aldershot
15:00			8' Pittman; 38' Duberry; 45' Leven; (yellow card) 24' Wright	Stadium: Recreation Ground; Attendance: 3,194

14 January 2012	Cheltenham Town	2–0	Aldershot Town	Cheltenham
15:00	Summerfield 10'; Mohamed 90'		(yellow card) 77' Vincenti	Stadium: Abbey Business Stadium; Attendance: 3,147

21 January 2012	Aldershot Town	0–0	Accrington Stanley	Aldershot
15:00			(yellow card) 90' Murphy	Stadium: Recreation Ground; Attendance: 2,581

28 January 2012	AFC Wimbledon	1–2	Aldershot Town	Kingston upon Thames, Greater London
15:00	S. Moore 28'		13', 70' Straker; (yellow card) 87' Herd	Stadium: Kingsmeadow; Attendance: 4,634

14 February 2012	Aldershot Town	1–0	Hereford United	Aldershot
19:45	Madjo 53'; Payne (yellow card) 90'		(red card) 66' Townsend; (yellow card) 68' Colbeck	Stadium: Recreation Ground; Attendance: 1,871

18 February 2012	Macclesfield Town	0–1	Aldershot Town	Macclesfield
15:00	Mills (yellow card) 13'; Diagne (yellow card) 53'; Tremarco (red card) 58'		65' Morris; (yellow card) 45' Bradley; (yellow card) 64' Jones; (yellow card) 75' Mekki	Stadium: Moss Rose; Attendance: 1,715

21 February 2012	Aldershot Town	2–0	Southend United	Aldershot
19:45	Mekki 26'; Payne 64' (pen.)			Stadium: Recreation Ground; Attendance: 2,949

25 February 2012	Aldershot Town	4–1	Barnet	Aldershot
15:00	Madjo 6', 51'; Hylton 17'; Brown 30'		58' Taylor; (yellow card) 77' Taylor	Stadium: Recreation Ground; Attendance: 2,511

3 March 2012	Aldershot Town	1–0	Morecambe	Aldershot
15:00	Madjo 26'; Payne (yellow card) 17'; Herd (yellow card) 75'; Mekki (yellow card) 79'; Brown (red card) 90+3'		(yellow card) 87' Haining; (yellow card) 89' McDonald	Stadium: Recreation Ground; Attendance: 2,381

6 March 2012	Torquay United	1–0	Aldershot Town	Torquay
19:45	Howe 7'			Stadium: Plainmoor; Attendance: 2,277

10 March 2012	Northampton Town	3–1	Aldershot Town	Northampton
15:00	Langmead 19'; Akinfenwa 40', 57'; Robinson (yellow card) 90'		90' Hylton; (yellow card) 45' Bradley; (yellow card) 45' Hylton	Stadium: Sixfields Stadium; Attendance: 5,071

13 March 2012	Crawley Town	2–2	Aldershot Town	Crawley
19:45	Alexander 33' (pen.); Clarke 88'; Davies (yellow card) 11'; Davis (yellow card) 17'; Cummings (yellow card) 21'		4' Morris; 63' Vincenti; (yellow card) 35' Morris; (yellow card) 40' Hylton; (yellow card) 69' Doughty; (yellow card) 83' Vincenti; (yellow card) 90' Young; (yellow card) 90' Straker	Stadium: Broadfield Stadium; Attendance: 3,017

17 March 2012	Aldershot Town	1–0	Bradford City	Aldershot
15:00	Risser 70'		(yellow card) 23' Hanson; (yellow card) 37' Seip	Stadium: Recreation Ground; Attendance: 2,763

20 March 2012	Southend United	0–1	Aldershot Town	Southend-on-Sea
19:45	Timlin (yellow card) 48'; Harris (yellow card) 63'		59' Hylton; (yellow card) 29' Brown; (yellow card) 61' Hylton; (yellow card) 64' Herd	Stadium: Roots Hall; Attendance: 4,580

27 March 2012	Aldershot Town	1–0	Bristol Rovers	Aldershot
19:45	Vincenti 43'; Bradley (yellow card) 57'		(yellow card) 86' Zebroski; (yellow card) 87' Dorman; (yellow card) 90' Paterson	Stadium: Recreation Ground; Attendance: 2,870

31 March 2012	Shrewsbury Town	1–1	Aldershot Town	Shrewsbury
15:00	Morgan 78'; Grandison (yellow card) 50'; D. McAllister (red card) 55'		51' (pen.) Payne; (yellow card) 81' Molesley; (yellow card) 90' Payne	Stadium: New Meadow; Attendance: 5,588

7 April 2012	Aldershot Town	1–2	Port Vale	Aldershot
15:00	Risser 86'		12', 74' Dodds	Stadium: Recreation Ground; Attendance: 2,747

9 April 2012	Plymouth Argyle	1–0	Aldershot Town	Plymouth
15:00	MacDonald 14'; Williams (yellow card) 45'; Feeney (yellow card) 54'; Wotton (yellow card) 72'; Bhasera (yellow card) 77'		(yellow card) 42' Jones; (yellow card) 90' Herd	Stadium: Home Park; Attendance: 8,677

14 April 2012	Aldershot Town	1–1	Dagenham & Redbridge	Aldershot
15:00	Brown 86'		60' Doe	Stadium: Recreation Ground; Attendance: 2,393

17 April 2012	Aldershot Town	2–1	Swindon Town	Aldershot
19:45	Madjo 12'; Hylton 58'; Hylton (yellow card) 16'; Morris (yellow card) 90'; Connolly (yellow card) 90'		53' Caddis	Stadium: Recreation Ground; Attendance: 3,562

21 April 2012	Burton Albion	0–4	Aldershot Town	Burton-on-Trent
15:00			16' Vincenti; 61' Risser; 76', 82' Madjo	Stadium: Pirelli Stadium; Attendance: 2,255

28 April 2012	Aldershot Town	2–2	Rotherham United	Aldershot
15:00	Vincenti 20'; Madjo 56'; Payne (yellow card) 48'; Vincenti (yellow card) 76'; Roberts (yellow card) 85' (red card)		11' Evans; 30' Hoskins; (yellow card) 78' Schofield; (yellow card) 82' (red card) Newey	Stadium: Recreation Ground; Attendance: 2,578

5 May 2012	Crewe Alexandra	2–2	Aldershot Town	Crewe
15:00	Leitch-Smith 4'; Murphy 76'		31' (o.g.) Davis; 45' Molesley; (yellow card) 51' Payne	Stadium: Alexandra Stadium; Attendance: 6,919

- Note: The Aldershot Town vs Southend United League 2 match was originally held on 26 December 2011, but was abandoned at half-time due to floodlight failure with the score at 0–1. Statistics from the abandoned match not recorded.

=== FA Cup ===
12 November 2011 R1	Maidenhead United	1–1	Aldershot Town	York Road
15:00	Thomas 7'; Hendry (yellow card) 28'; Behzadi (yellow card) 72'; Thomas (yellow card) 80'		78' Rankine; (yellow card) 90' Rankine	Attendance: 2,283; Referee: Woolmer

22 November 2011 R1R	Aldershot Town	2–0	Maidenhead United	Recreation Ground
19:45	Rodman 15'; Guttridge 34'; Collins (yellow card) 30'		(yellow card) 30' Saroya; (yellow card) 42' Solomon	Attendance: 2,181; Referee: Whitestone

3 December 2011 R2	Sheffield Wednesday	1–0	Aldershot Town	Hillsborough Stadium
15:00	Lowe 49'; Bennett (yellow card) 83'			Attendance: 10,162; Referee: Salisbury

=== Football League Cup ===
24 August 2011 Round 1	West Ham United	1–2	Aldershot Town	Upton Park
19:45	Stanislas 16'; McNaughton (red card) 47'		78' Guttridge; 89' Hylton; (yellow card) 67' Herd	Attendance: 19,879; Referee: Scott

30 August 2011 Round 2	Aldershot Town	2–0	Carlisle United	Recreation Ground
19:45	Rankine 45'; Livesey 75' (o.g.); Guttridge (yellow card) 70'		(yellow card) 54' Robson; (yellow card) 79' Berrett; (yellow card) 80' Curran	Attendance: 2,809; Referee: Linington

20 September 2011 Round 3	Aldershot Town	2–1	Rochdale	Recreation Ground
19:45	Rankine 47'; Hylton 78'		45' Grimes; (yellow card) 43' Kennedy; (yellow card) 68' Balkestein; (yellow card) 87' Jones; (yellow card) 90' Grimes	Attendance: 3,334; Referee: D'Urso

25 October 2011 Round 4	Aldershot Town	0–3	Manchester United	Recreation Ground
19:45			(yellow card) 9' Vidić; 15' Berbatov; 41' Owen; 48' Valencia	Attendance: 7,044; Referee: Lee Probert

- Note: Aldershot's Carling Cup first round away trip to West Ham was drawn to be played on 9 August 2011, but police considered it to be postponed due to the continuing riots happening in London at the time.

=== Football League Trophy ===
4 October 2011 Round 2	Aldershot Town	1–2	Oxford United	Recreation Ground
19:45	Hylton 76'		49' Hall; 52' Smalley; (yellow card) 76' Batt	Attendance: 1,429; Referee: Linnington
