= Adam Mekki =

English footballer

Personal information
- Full name: Adam Rhys Mekki
- Date of birth: 24 December 1991 (age 34)
- Place of birth: Chester, England
- Height: 5 ft 9 in (1.75 m)
- Position: Midfielder

Youth career
- –2006: Reading
- 2006–2009: Aldershot Town

Senior career*
Years	Team	Apps	(Gls)
2009–2014	Aldershot Town	88	(6)
2011	→ Oxford City (loan)	6	(2)
2011	→ Carshalton Athletic (loan)	1	(0)
2011	→ Dorchester Town (loan)	5	(0)
2011	→ Basingstoke Town (loan)	2	(0)
2014	Barnet	9	(0)
2015	Dover Athletic	1	(0)
2015–2017	Tranmere Rovers	59	(4)
2017–2020	Bromley	73	(5)
2020	→ Ebbsfleet United (loan)	8	(0)
2020–2022	Ebbsfleet United	32	(6)
2022–2023	Dorking Wanderers	7	(1)
2023	Dorking Wanderers B	1	(0)
2023	→ Bath City (loan)	2	(0)
2023–2024	Farnborough	8	(0)
2023–2024	→ Bracknell Town (loan)	15	(1)
2024–2025	Walton & Hersham	6	(1)
Total		323	(26)
- * Club domestic league appearances and goals as of 11:29, 26 January 2025 (UTC)

Adam Rhys Mekki (born 24 December 1991) is an English former footballer who played as a midfielder. He is of Welsh and Tunisian descent.

== Playing career ==
=== Club ===
Mekki spent his youth at the Reading academy, before switching to Aldershot Town in 2006. He signed a professional contract with the club in the summer of 2009. In January 2011 he was loaned out to Southern Football League Premier Division side Oxford City, scoring two goals in six appearances. He made his Aldershot debut on 12 February 2011, replacing Jermaine McGlashan 81 minutes into a goalless draw at the Recreation Ground. He made his second appearance on 8 March, playing 45 minutes of a 1–0 win over Torquay United after replacing Albert Jarrett at half-time. On 26 April, it was announced that he had signed a two-year contract extension with the club. Mekki left Aldershot on 17 June 2014 after failing to agree terms on a new deal.

Mekki joined Barnet on a short-term deal on 12 August 2014. He made his debut when he started a home game against Dartford on 25 August. After eleven appearances in all competitions, without scoring, Mekki was released by Barnet to find first-team football elsewhere. He was not paid a wage during his time at the club.

Mekki signed for Dover Athletic on 15 January 2015 until the end of the season.

After leaving Dover, Mekki had a trial with Tranmere Rovers, in which he scored in a pre-season friendly against Shrewsbury Town. The trial was successful, and Mekki signed a six-month contract with the club. Following a successful season, Mekki signed a new one-year deal with Tranmere, with the option for a further 12 months.

At the end of the 2016–2017 season, Mekki was released by Tranmere and signed for National League rivals Bromley.

On 7 June 2017, Mekki signed for Bromley.

Having been defeated in the National League South play-off final for Ebbsfleet United, Mekki joined winning finalists Dorking Wanderers in June 2022. In February 2023, he joined Bath City on a one-month loan deal.

On 29 May 2023, Mekki returned to the National League South to join Farnborough following his release from Dorking. In December 2023, he joined Bracknell Town on loan.

In July 2024, Mekki joined Southern League Premier Division South club Walton & Hersham.

On 25 January 2025, Mekki announced his retirement as a player.

== International career ==
In August 2012 Mekki was named as a standby player for the Wales under-21 squad.

== Career statistics ==
As of 15 May 2020

Appearances and goals by club, season and competition
Club	Season	League			FA Cup		League Cup		Other		Total	
Club	Season	Division	Apps	Goals	Apps	Goals	Apps	Goals	Apps	Goals	Apps	Goals
Aldershot Town	2010–11	League Two	8	0	0	0	0	0	0	0	8	0
Aldershot Town	2011–12	League Two	25	1	1	0	1	0	0	0	27	1
Aldershot Town	2012–13	League Two	29	2	2	0	1	0	2 (Note: Appearances in Football League Trophy)	0	34	2
Aldershot Town	2013–14	Conference Premier	26	3	0	0	—		0	0	26	3
Aldershot Town	Total		88	6	3	0	2	0	2	0	95	6
Barnet	2014–15	Conference Premier	9	0	1	0	—		1	0	11	0
Dover Athletic	2014–15	Conference Premier	1	0	0	0	—		1	0	1	0
Tranmere Rovers	2015–16	National League	39	4	0	0	—		0	0	39	4
Tranmere Rovers	2016–17	National League	20	0	0	0	—		0	0	20	0
Tranmere Rovers	Total		59	4	0	0	—		0	0	59	4
Bromley	2017–18	National League	37	3	3	1	—		5	0	45	4
Bromley	2018–19	National League	18	1	2	0	—		1	0	21	1
Bromley	2019–20	National League	18	1	3	0	—		0	0	21	1
Bromley	Total		73	5	8	1	—		6	0	87	6
Ebbsfleet United (loan)	2019–20	National League	8	0	0	0	—		0	0	8	0
Career total			238	20	12	1	2	0	9	0	261	21

== Honours ==
Bromley

- FA Trophy runner-up: 2017–18

== Personal life ==
He graduated in 2022 from Staffordshire University with a First class degree in Professional Sports Writing and Broadcasting.
