= Ross Worner =

English footballer (born 1989)

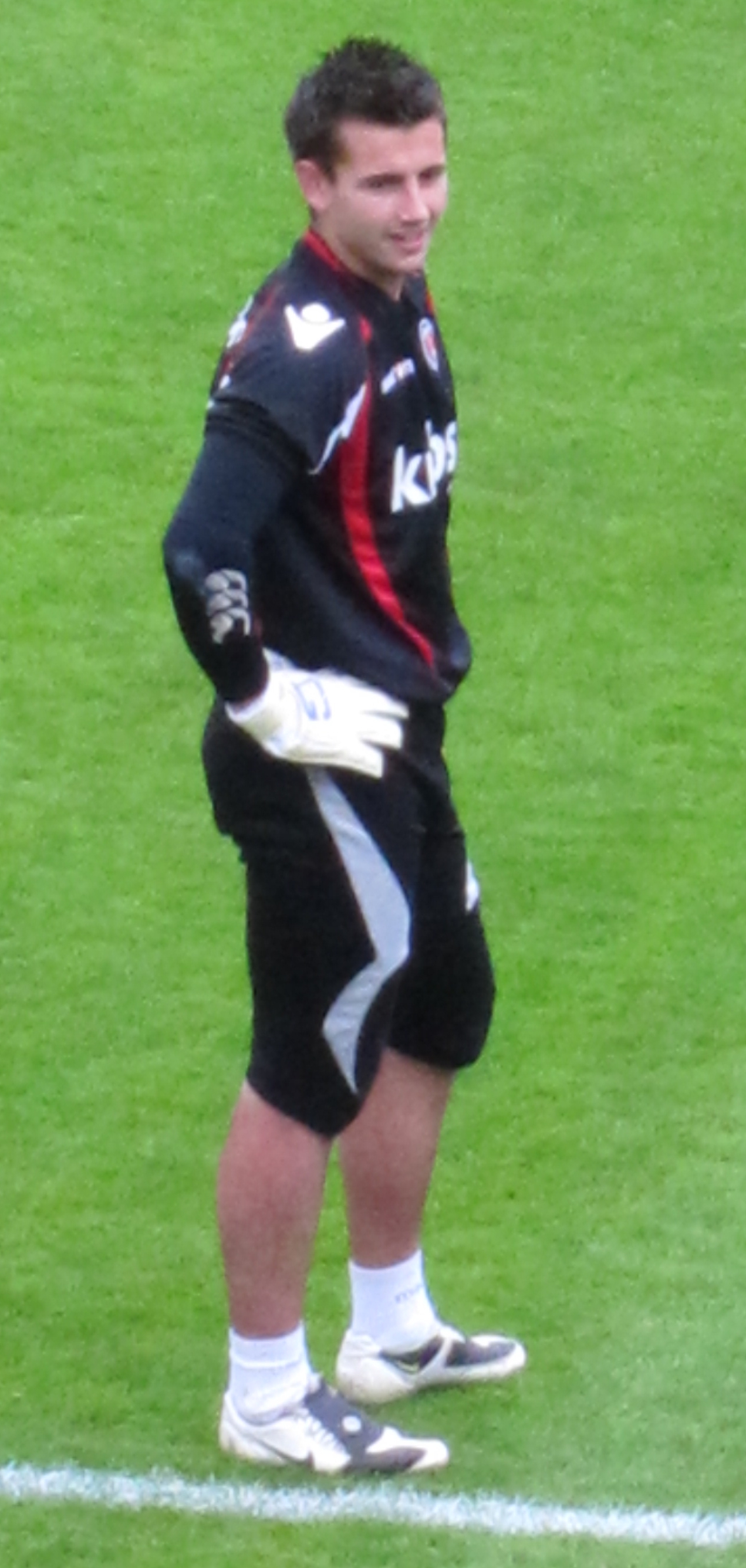
- Worner playing for Charlton Athletic in 2010

Personal information
- Full name: Ross Nicholas Worner
- Date of birth: 3 October 1989 (age 37)
- Place of birth: Hindhead, England
- Height: 6 ft 1 in (1.85 m)
- Position: Goalkeeper

Youth career
- –2007: Woking

Senior career*
| Years | Team | Apps | (Gls) |
| 2007–2010 | Woking | 61 | (0) |
| 2007 | → Westfield (loan) | 3 | (0) |
| 2010–2011 | Charlton Athletic | 8 | (0) |
| 2011–2013 | Aldershot Town | 23 | (0) |
| 2012–2013 | → Eastbourne Borough (loan) | 7 | (0) |
| 2013 | → Farnborough (loan) | 7 | (0) |
| 2013–2015 | AFC Wimbledon | 50 | (0) |
| 2014 | → Woking (loan) | 9 | (0) |
| 2014 | → Woking (loan) | 7 | (0) |
| 2015–2019 | Sutton United | 91 | (0) |
| 2018 | → Chelmsford City (loan) | 4 | (0) |
| 2018–2019 | → Maidstone United (loan) | 5 | (0) |
| 2019–2024 | Havant & Waterlooville | 132 | (0) |
| 2024–2025 | Sholing | 12 | (0) |
- * Club domestic league appearances and goals as of 17:10, 4 June 2025 (UTC)

Ross Nicholas Worner (born 3 October 1989) is an English semi-professional footballer who plays as a goalkeeper.

== Career ==
=== Early years ===
Worner was born in Hindhead, Surrey. He came through the youth academy of Football Conference club Woking, having joined the club at the age of 14. The goalkeeper made his first-team debut aged 17 as a 25th-minute substitute for the injured Nick Gindre against Cambridge United on 25 August 2007, keeping a clean sheet as the match finished a 0–0 draw. Worner went on to make a further 15 league appearances for the Cards in the 2007–08 season. As a result, Worner earned himself a full-time contract with the club, keeping him until 2008–09 season. During the 2007–08 season, Worner had a three-game loan spell at Woking-based club Westfield.

After an injury struck season in 2008–09, he came back and was made first team goalkeeper by Graham Baker. He made 52 appearances during the season. He was awarded Manager's Player of the Year and Supporters' Club Player at the end of season awards.

=== Charlton Athletic ===
On 5 August 2010, Worner signed for Charlton Athletic for an undisclosed fee. On 10 August, Worner made his first team debut in the League Cup against Shrewsbury Town and let in four goals as the Addicks gave away a 3–0 lead to lose 4–3. He made his first league appearance in a 3–1 defeat away to Huddersfield Town on 28 August 2010. His first Charlton win was against Dagenham & Redbridge in the 1–0 victory in the Football League Trophy on 31 August 2010.

On 10 May 2011, Worner was released from Charlton Athletic having not being offered a new contract.

=== Aldershot Town ===
He signed a two-year deal with Aldershot Town on 2 June 2011. Worner made his debut in a 2–0 win over Carlisle United in a League Cup on 30 August 2011 where Worner kept a clean sheet. Worner made his league debut for Aldershot in a win over Cheltenham Town 1–0 which also kept a clean sheet. On 5 November 2011, Worner received a straight red card in a 2–0 defeat to Rotherham United after a challenge on Alex Revell in the 55th minute. He was replaced by Jamie Collins who is not a goalkeeper. Worner served a 4 match ban and Jamie Young took his place in goal. Worner made his return in goal for Aldershot in a 0–0 draw against Plymouth Argyle on 31 December 2011. Since then, Worner established himself as a first choice goalkeeper the club. Due to his good performance for the club, Worner signed a new deal with the club that will keep him at the club until the end of the 2013–14 season. However, his first season was cut short after 22 appearances as he suffered a back injury that ruled him out of the rest of the season.

At the new season, the club would find themselves in the bottom of the league. In November after 10 months out, Worner recovered from the injury, which delighted manager Holdsworth, to welcome him back to the squad and played his first match in a youth match of Aldershot in a 4–1 win over Alresford Town. However, manager Holdsworth expected him to leave the club on loan to get first team experience. On 14 December 2012, Worner joined Conference South club Eastbourne Borough. On 1 April, Worner was recalled by the club, which his return as in goal for Aldershot's match in a 3–2 win over Oxford. Though making one appearance for the club, Worner was released by the club in the wake of the club's administration.

=== AFC Wimbledon ===
On 21 June 2013, Worner signed for League Two club AFC Wimbledon. He made his debut for "The Dons" on the opening day of the 2013–14 season, a 1–1 draw against Torquay United at Plainmoor on 3 August 2013. Worner soon established himself as a first choice goalkeeper that saw him received praise from the club's management. His performance even saw him earned a nomination for the League Two Player of the Month award. In his first season, resulting him awarded Junior Dons Player of the Year along with Barry Fuller, Worner made forty-five league appearances for the club and missed one match in what turned out to be Seb Brown's farewell season against Morecambe on 26 April 2014.

However, in his second season saw Worner lose his first choice goalkeeper place to James Shea and as a result on 10 September 2014, Worner returned to Woking on a one-month emergency loan with the club's contracted goalkeepers Jake Cole and Aaron Howe out injured. Two days after signing for the club, Worner made his Woking return in a 1–0 win over Chester. The loan was extended by a further month once this had expired, as Aaron Howe had not recovered from his injury caused playing against Aldershot Town. Shortly after his loan period ended, he was recalled by the club again in November for a month to help cover because of goalkeeper injuries. On 28 November 2014, Worner re-signed for Woking on loan for the second time this season. Worner went on to make seven more appearances for the club before returning to his parent.

Upon returning to his parent club, Worner continued to be out of the first team and played in the reserve until he made his first appearance of the season, in a 2–1 loss against Mansfield Town on 17 March 2015. It came after the club's first choice goalkeeper, Shea, was injured. Worner made first five appearance for the club for the rest of the season. At the end of the 2014–15 season, Worner was released by the club after two season.

=== Sutton United ===
After being released by AFC Wimbledon, Worner joined Sutton United after they lost their first choice keeper, Jason Brown, who took a coaching position with Gillingham. Worner picked up the Reusch Goalkeeper of the Year 2015–16 award on 23 May 2016 at The Non-League Paper's National Game Awards in association with The NLFA for keeping 26 clean sheets himself. He was also voted Player of the Year by Sutton supporters.

On 24 January 2017, Worner made his 100th career appearance for Sutton in a 3–2 (a.e.t) victory over Worthing in an FA Trophy second round replay.

Worner appeared in every round of Sutton's historic run to the 5th round of the FA Cup for the first time ever, including appearances in a 3–1 victory over his former team AFC Wimbledon of League One on 17 January 2017, a 1–0 victory over Championship team Leeds United on 29 January and a 0–2 defeat to Premier League club Arsenal on 20 February.

Worner joined National League South club Chelmsford City on 8 June 2018 on a season-long loan. In August 2018, Worner's loan at Chelmsford was cut short due to being "unable to commit to the distances that he was being required to travel" according to Chelmsford manager Rod Stringer. On 5 December 2018, Worner was loaned out to Maidstone United until the end of the season. He was recalled on 4 January 2019 by Sutton.

== Career statistics ==
As of match played 9 November 2024

Appearances and goals by club, season and competition
| Club | Season | League | | | FA Cup | | League Cup | | Other | | Total | |
| Club | Season | Division | Apps | Goals | Apps | Goals | Apps | Goals | Apps | Goals | Apps | Goals |
|---|---|---|---|---|---|---|---|---|---|---|---|---|
| Woking | 2007–08 | Conference Premier | 16 | 0 | 0 | 0 | — | | 4 (Note: Appearances in Conference League Cup) | 0 | 20 | 0 |
| Woking | 2008–09 | Conference Premier | 4 | 0 | 0 | 0 | — | | 0 | 0 | 4 | 0 |
| Woking | 2009–10 | Conference South | 41 | 0 | 4 | 0 | — | | 6 (Note: Three appearances in FA Trophy, three in Conference South play-offs) | 0 | 51 | 0 |
| Woking | Total | | 61 | 0 | 4 | 0 | — | | 10 | 0 | 75 | 0 |
| Westfield (loan) | 2007–08 | Combined Counties Division One | 3 | 0 | 0 | 0 | — | | 0 | 0 | 3 | 0 |
| Charlton Athletic | 2010–11 | League One | 8 | 0 | 0 | 0 | 1 | 0 | 1 (Note: Appearance in Football League Trophy) | 0 | 10 | 0 |
| Aldershot Town | 2011–12 | League Two | 22 | 0 | 0 | 0 | 3 | 0 | 0 | 0 | 25 | 0 |
| Aldershot Town | 2012–13 | League Two | 1 | 0 | 0 | 0 | 0 | 0 | 0 | 0 | 1 | 0 |
| Aldershot Town | Total | | 23 | 0 | 0 | 0 | 3 | 0 | 0 | 0 | 26 | 0 |
| Eastbourne Borough (loan) | 2012–13 | Conference South | 7 | 0 | — | | — | | — | | 7 | 0 |
| Farnborough (loan) | 2012–13 | Conference South | 7 | 0 | — | | — | | — | | 7 | 0 |
| AFC Wimbledon | 2013–14 | League Two | 45 | 0 | 0 | 0 | 1 | 0 | 1 | 0 | 47 | 0 |
| AFC Wimbledon | 2014–15 | League Two | 5 | 0 | 0 | 0 | 0 | 0 | 0 | 0 | 5 | 0 |
| AFC Wimbledon | Total | | 50 | 0 | 0 | 0 | 1 | 0 | 1 | 0 | 52 | 0 |
| Woking (loan) | 2014–15 | Conference Premier | 16 | 0 | — | | — | | 1 (Note: Appearance(s) in FA Trophy) | 0 | 17 | 0 |
| Sutton United | 2015–16 | National League South | 41 | 0 | 4 | 0 | — | | 5 | 0 | 50 | 0 |
| Sutton United | 2016–17 | National League | 31 | 0 | 7 | 0 | — | | 5 | 0 | 43 | 0 |
| Sutton United | 2017–18 | National League | 1 | 0 | 0 | 0 | — | | 0 | 0 | 1 | 0 |
| Sutton United | 2018–19 | National League | 18 | 0 | 1 | 0 | — | | 2 (Note: Appearance in the Scottish Challenge Cup) | 0 | 21 | 0 |
| Sutton United | Total | | 91 | 0 | 12 | 0 | — | | 12 | 0 | 115 | 0 |
| Chelmsford City (loan) | 2018–19 | National League South | 4 | 0 | 0 | 0 | — | | 0 | 0 | 4 | 0 |
| Maidstone United (loan) | 2018–19 | National League | 5 | 0 | 0 | 0 | — | | 2 | 0 | 7 | 0 |
| Havant & Waterlooville | 2019–20 | National League South | 35 | 0 | 1 | 0 | — | | 1 | 0 | 37 | 0 |
| Havant & Waterlooville | 2020–21 | National League South | 12 | 0 | 3 | 0 | — | | 1 | 0 | 16 | 0 |
| Havant & Waterlooville | 2021–22 | National League South | 28 | 0 | 3 | 0 | — | | 0 | 0 | 31 | 0 |
| Havant & Waterlooville | 2022–23 | National League South | 15 | 0 | 1 | 0 | — | | 0 | 0 | 16 | 0 |
| Havant & Waterlooville | 2023–24 | National League South | 42 | 0 | 0 | 0 | — | | 1 | 0 | 43 | 0 |
| Havant & Waterlooville | Total | | 132 | 0 | 8 | 0 | — | | 3 | 0 | 143 | 0 |
| Sholing | 2024–25 | Southern League Premier Division South | 12 | 0 | 1 | 0 | — | | 1 | 0 | 14 | 0 |
| Career total | | | 419 | 0 | 25 | 0 | 5 | 0 | 31 | 0 | 480 | 0 |

== Honours ==
Sutton United

- National League South: 2015–16
