= Alex Rodman =

English footballer (born 1987)

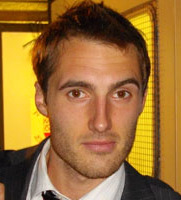
- Rodman in 2010

Personal information
- Full name: Alexander James Rodman
- Date of birth: 15 February 1987 (age 39)
- Place of birth: Sutton Coldfield, England
- Height: 6 ft 2 in (1.88 m)
- Position: Winger

Youth career
- Aston Villa
- Wolverhampton Wanderers
- Arden Forest
- –2005: Coleshill Town

Senior career*
Years	Team	Apps	(Gls)
2005–2006	Leamington	25	(3)
2006–2007	Grantham Town	29	(2)
2007	Lincoln United	13	(5)
2007–2008	Gainsborough Trinity	12	(2)
2008	Nuneaton Borough	16	(2)
2008–2011	Tamworth	83	(21)
2011–2013	Aldershot Town	43	(7)
2012–2013	→ York City (loan)	18	(1)
2013–2014	Grimsby Town	35	(7)
2014–2015	Gateshead	39	(9)
2015–2016	Newport County	29	(4)
2016–2017	Notts County	16	(1)
2017–2018	Shrewsbury Town	61	(11)
2018–2023	Bristol Rovers	76	(8)
Total		482	(73)

International career
2006–2007	England Futsal	5	
2010	England C	2	(1)
- * Club domestic league appearances and goals as of 13:59, 17 May 2022 (UTC)

Alexander James Rodman (born 15 February 1987) is an English former professional footballer who played as a winger.

Rodman was a schoolboy with Aston Villa and Wolverhampton Wanderers before playing in the youth teams of Arden Forest and Coleshill Town. He started his senior career after signing for Leamington in 2005. After one season he signed with Grantham Town, leaving them in 2007 before having spells with Lincoln United, Gainsborough Trinity and Nuneaton Borough. He signed for Tamworth in 2008, winning the Conference North title in his first season with the club. After a season-and-a-half of playing for them in the Conference Premier, Rodman signed for League Two club Aldershot Town in 2011. He had a loan spell with York City from 2012 to 2013 before joining Grimsby Town. He helped them to the Conference Premier play-offs before moving to Gateshead in 2014. After one season with them he joined Newport County of League Two in 2015.

== Club career ==
=== Early career ===
Born in Sutton Coldfield, West Midlands, Rodman played schoolboy football with Aston Villa and Wolverhampton Wanderers and in the youth teams of Arden Forest and Coleshill Town. He began his senior career after signing for Midland Football Alliance club Leamington in 2005, with whom was named the 2005–06 FA Cup's "Player of the Round" for the third qualifying round following a 2–0 win over Woodford United. This helped Leamington to a first round tie against League One team Colchester United, which Rodman played in as the team were beaten 9–1. He made 41 appearances and scored five goals for Leamington in the 2005–06 season, playing mostly as a right wing-back and a midfielder.

Rodman signed for Northern Premier League Premier Division club Grantham Town at the start of the 2006–07 season, after an unsuccessful trial with Alfreton Town. Having finished the season with 33 appearances and two goals for Grantham, he signed for Lincoln United of the Northern Premier League Premier Division in July 2007 after Grantham's relegation to the Northern Premier League Division One South. He scored five goals in 20 appearances for United before signing for Conference North club Gainsborough Trinity in November 2007, making his debut as a substitute in a 1–0 defeat away to Burscough on 3 November. Having scored two goals in 12 appearances, he departed Gainsborough for league rivals Nuneaton Borough in January 2008. He made his debut on 26 January as a substitute in a 3–0 home win over Workington, before scoring his first goal on 22 March in a 3–2 defeat away to Kettering Town. He scored two goals in 17 appearances for Nuneaton.

=== Tamworth ===
Rodman signed for Tamworth on 30 May 2008 on a one-year contract with Nuneaton experiencing financial difficulties. He finished the 2008–09 season with 10 goals in 40 appearances as Tamworth won the Conference North title. In June 2009, he signed a new one-year contract ahead, of their return to the Conference Premier. Following his first season with Tamworth back in the Conference Premier, in which he scored two goals in 24 appearances, Rodman went on trial with League One club Notts County. After the trial came to an end Rodman signed a new one-year contract with Tamworth in July 2010. One of Rodman's last matches for Tamworth was against Newport County on 11 January 2011, in which he scored a hat-trick, impressing County's Aldershot Town-bound manager Dean Holdsworth.

=== Aldershot Town ===
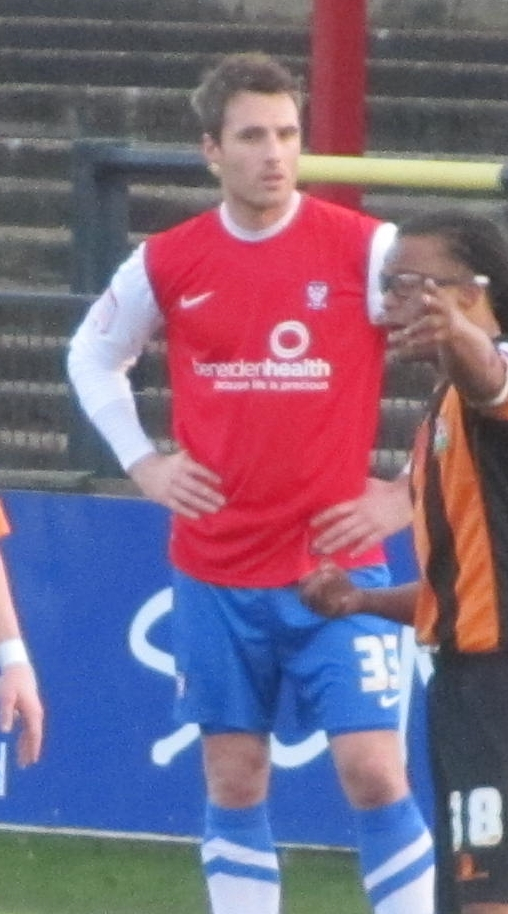
Rodman playing for York City in 2013

Rodman left Tamworth to join League Two club Aldershot Town on 26 January 2011 on a two-and-a-half-year contract for an undisclosed fee. He made his first appearance for Aldershot on 29 January 2011 after coming off the bench at Gillingham to replace Wade Small in the 49th minute. Rodman scored a late consolation goal in a 2–1 defeat with a 25-yard shot during stoppage time. He finished the season with five goals in 14 appearances for Aldershot. Rodman missed the rest of the 2011–12 season after being diagnosed with a pulmonary embolism in January 2012, after tests showed he had three blood clots in his lungs. He had made 26 appearances and scored two goals for Aldershot up to that point in the 2011–12 season. He resumed training during the pre-season of 2012.

Rodman signed for Aldershot's League Two rivals York City on 7 November 2012 on a two-month loan. He made his debut after starting York's 3–0 defeat at home to AFC Wimbledon on 10 November 2012, but was substituted in the 58th minute. He scored his first goal in his next appearance, in a 2–2 draw away to Port Vale on 17 November 2012. After making eight appearances and scoring one goal for York, the loan was extended until the end of the 2012–13 season in January 2013. Rodman was sent back to Aldershot on 4 April 2013 having been deemed surplus to requirements by new manager Nigel Worthington. He had scored one goal in 18 appearances for York.

=== Grimsby Town ===
Rodman along with the entire Aldershot squad were released following the club's relegation to the Conference Premier and subsequent entry into financial administration that followed. He signed a one-year contract with Grimsby Town of the Conference Premier on 8 July 2013. Rodman left the club on 12 May 2014 after deciding not to activate the clause for a further year in his contract.

=== Gateshead ===
After a move to Scottish Championship club Hibernian broke down, Rodman signed for Gateshead of the Conference Premier on a one-year contract on 14 July 2014. He made his debut on 9 August 2014 in a 3–1 home win against Torquay United. Rodman scored his first goal for Gateshead on 16 August 2014 in a 2–2 draw away to Eastleigh. He made 44 appearances and scored 11 goals in the 2014–15 season as Gateshead finished 10th in the Conference Premier table.

=== Newport County ===
Rodman signed for League Two club Newport County on a one-year contract on 9 June 2015. He made his debut for Newport on 8 August 2015 in the League Two match against Cambridge United. Rodman was offered a new contract by Newport at the end of the 2015–16 season but chose to move on.

=== Notts County ===
Rodman signed for Notts County on 24 June 2016.

=== Shrewsbury Town ===
After half a season at Notts County, Rodman was allowed to leave on a free transfer, joining League One club Shrewsbury Town on 5 January 2017 on an 18-month contract. He made his debut two days later in a 1–1 draw away to Swindon Town, and scored his first goal for the club, a 63rd-minute equaliser against Gillingham, on 28 January. Rodman made 20 appearances, scoring once, to help Shrewsbury avoid relegation at the end of his first half season at the club.

=== Bristol Rovers ===
After turning down a new contract with Shrewsbury, Rodman signed for their League One rivals Bristol Rovers on 2 July 2018 on a contract of undisclosed length. He scored his first goal when he opened the scoring in a 2–1 defeat away to Sunderland on 15 December 2018. Rodman concluded the 2018–19 season with two goals in a 2–1 comeback victory over Barnsley.

Rodman missed the start of the 2020–21 season after an illness that saw him suffering from bouts of vertigo. He made his return to first-team action on 26 December 2020, in a 2–0 defeat at Milton Keynes Dons. Rodman had a run in the team under Rovers' third manager of the season Joey Barton, a run in which Rodman scored an impressive second goal as they won 4–1 against Accrington Stanley to help in their battle against relegation. On 14 April 2021, Rodman was awarded the PFA Players in the Community award for League One for his work in education through the club.

In September 2021, Rodman suffered a broken foot in training that manager Joey Barton estimated would keep him out for around three months. In January 2022 he made his return to the matchday squad as an unused substitute in a 1–0 win over Walsall. In March however, Barton revealed that Rodman had suffered another injury setback and was likely to miss the rest of the season. Rodman made only four appearances across the season, all of which came in August, as Rovers were promoted on the final day of the season, a 7–0 victory seeing the club move into the final automatic promotion place on goals scored.

In July 2022, Barton revealed that with Rodman having been unable to take part in Rovers' summer training programme, he was not in Barton's plans to feature at all for the upcoming 2022–23 season. Rodman's contract situation was revealed also with him entering the new season on heavily reduced terms as a result of his contract negotiation with previous CEO Martyn Starnes. In August 2022, it was revealed that Rodman was training away from the first-team having been told that his future lay away from the club. Having failed to make a matchday squad across the 2022–23 season, Rodman announced his retirement.

== International career ==
=== Futsal ===
Rodman has represented England in futsal, making five appearances between 2006 and 2007, and had also been a member of the English and British Universities squad whilst studying Business at Nottingham Trent University.

=== England C ===
Rodman made his England C debut on 26 May 2010 against the Republic of Ireland, coming on as an 89th-minute substitute. He made his second appearance on 15 September 2010 against Wales semi-pro, scoring the second goal in a 2–2 draw. Rodman was then picked for the squad that would play Belgium on 9 February 2011 but withdrew due to becoming a Football League player.

== Personal life ==
Rodman holds degrees in Business Studies from Nottingham Trent University and Sports Directorship from Manchester Metropolitan University. He is a founding partner at Sterling James Wealth Management, intending to offer greater financial help to former professional sportsmen.

Following his retirement from football, Rodman signed up for the Clutch Pro Tour, a UK golf development tour feeding into the Challenge Tour.

== Career statistics ==
As of end of 2021–22 season

Appearances and goals by club, season and competition
Club	Season	League			FA Cup		League Cup		Other		Total	
Club	Season	Division	Apps	Goals	Apps	Goals	Apps	Goals	Apps	Goals	Apps	Goals
Leamington	2005–06	Midland Football Alliance	25	3	7	2	—		9 (Note: Two appearances in FA Vase, two in Birmingham Senior Cup, five in Midland Football Alliance League Cup)	0	41	5
Grantham Town	2006–07	Northern Premier League; Premier Division	29	2	1	0	—		3 (Note: One appearance in FA Trophy, two in Northern Premier League Challenge Cup)	0	33	2
Gainsborough Trinity	2007–08	Conference North	12	2	—		—		—		12	2
Nuneaton Borough	2007–08	Conference North	16	2	—		—		1 (Note: Appearance in Conference League Cup)	0	17	2
Tamworth	2008–09	Conference North	35	10	3	0	—		2 (Note: One appearance in Conference League Cup, one in FA Trophy)	0	40	10
Tamworth	2009–10	Conference Premier	23	2	0	0	—		1 (Note: Appearance FA Trophy)	0	24	2
Tamworth	2010–11	Conference Premier	25	9	4	1	—		1	1	30	11
Tamworth	Total		83	21	7	1	—		4	1	94	23
Aldershot Town	2010–11	League Two	14	5	—		—		—		14	5
Aldershot Town	2011–12	League Two	18	1	3	1	4	0	1 (Note: Appearance in Football League Trophy)	0	26	2
Aldershot Town	2012–13	League Two	11	1	0	0	1	0	1	0	13	1
Aldershot Town	Total		43	7	3	1	5	0	2	0	53	8
York City (loan)	2012–13	League Two	18	1	—		—		—		18	1
Grimsby Town	2013–14	Conference Premier	35	7	5	0	—		8 (Note: Six appearances and one goal in FA Trophy, two appearances in Conference Premier play-offs)	1	48	8
Gateshead	2014–15	Conference Premier	39	9	4	2	—		1	0	44	11
Newport County	2015–16	League Two	29	4	3	1	1	0	1	0	34	5
Notts County	2016–17	League Two	16	1	1	0	1	0	1 (Note: Appearance(s) in EFL Trophy)	0	19	1
Shrewsbury Town	2016–17	League One	20	1	—		—		—		20	1
Shrewsbury Town	2017–18	League One	41	5	4	2	1	0	9 (Note: Six appearances and one goal in EFL Trophy, three appearances and one goal in League One play-offs)	2	55	9
Shrewsbury Town	Total		61	6	4	2	1	0	9	2	75	10
Bristol Rovers	2018–19	League One	27	5	1	0	2	0	4	2	34	7
Bristol Rovers	2019–20	League One	29	2	5	1	2	0	4	0	40	3
Bristol Rovers	2020–21	League One	16	1	1	0	0	0	1	0	18	1
Bristol Rovers	2021–22	League Two	4	0	0	0	0	0	0	0	4	0
Bristol Rovers	Total		76	8	7	1	4	0	9	2	96	11
Career total			482	73	42	10	12	0	48	6	584	89

== Honours ==
Tamworth

- Conference North: 2008–09

Shrewsbury Town

- EFL Trophy runner-up: 2017–18
