= Jordan Roberts (footballer, born 1994) =

English footballer (born 1994)

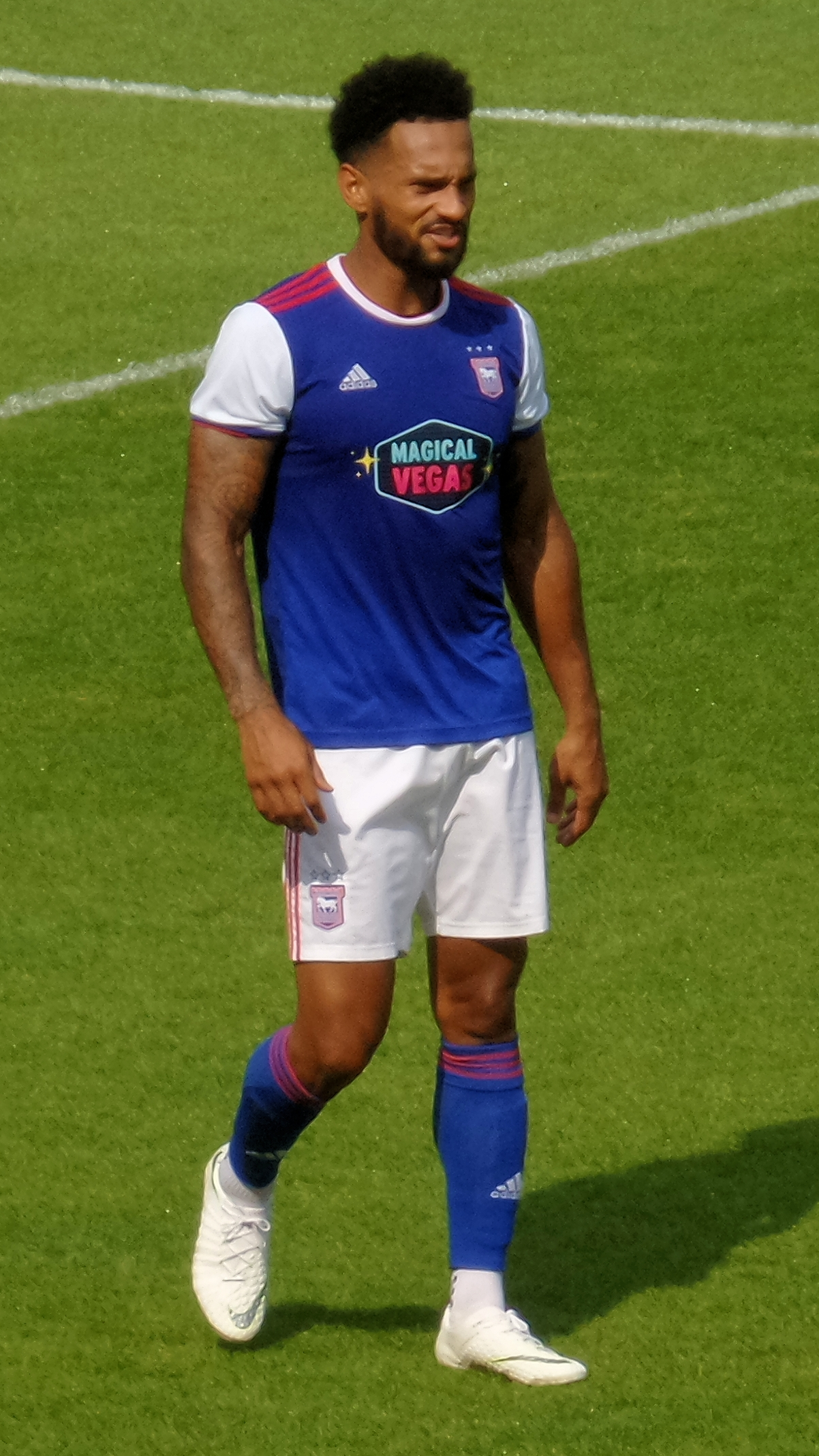
- Roberts playing for Ipswich Town in 2018

Personal information
- Full name: Jordan Stephen Roberts
- Date of birth: 5 January 1994 (age 32)
- Place of birth: Watford, England
- Height: 6 ft 1 in (1.85 m)
- Positions: Winger; striker

Team information
- Current team: Stevenage
- Number: 11

Youth career
- 2010–2011: Peterborough United
- 2011–2012: Aldershot Town

Senior career*
| Years | Team | Apps | (Gls) |
| 2012–2015 | Aldershot Town | 86 | (11) |
| 2012 | → Havant & Waterlooville (loan) | 3 | (0) |
| 2013 | → Tamworth (loan) | 0 | (0) |
| 2013 | → Bishop's Stortford (loan) | 5 | (1) |
| 2015–2016 | Inverness Caledonian Thistle | 9 | (2) |
| 2016–2018 | Crawley Town | 58 | (9) |
| 2018–2020 | Ipswich Town | 13 | (0) |
| 2019 | → Lincoln City (loan) | 5 | (0) |
| 2020 | → Gillingham (loan) | 10 | (2) |
| 2020–2022 | Heart of Midlothian | 6 | (0) |
| 2021–2022 | → Motherwell (loan) | 18 | (1) |
| 2022 | Motherwell | 7 | (2) |
| 2022– | Stevenage | 169 | (21) |

International career^{‡}
| 2014–2015 | England C | 2 | (1) |
- * Club domestic league appearances and goals as of 15:48, 18 May 2026 (UTC) ‡ National team caps and goals as of 14:56, 16 December 2017 (UTC)

Jordan Stephen Roberts (born 5 January 1994) is an English professional footballer who plays as a winger or striker for EFL League One club Stevenage.

After spending one year on an academy scholarship at Peterborough United, Roberts joined Aldershot Town's youth system in the summer of 2011. He signed his first professional contract and made his first-team debut for Aldershot in League Two in February 2012. Roberts was loaned out three times during the 2012–13 season in order to gain first-team experience, at non-League clubs Havant & Waterlooville, Tamworth and Bishop's Stortford respectively. Roberts returned to Aldershot and played regularly for two seasons in the Conference Premier, scoring 13 times in 100 appearances during his time at the club. Roberts trialled with Scottish Premiership club Inverness Caledonian Thistle in July 2015, ultimately spending the 2015–16 season there. He moved back to England when he signed for League Two club Crawley Town in June 2016.

Roberts spent two seasons at Crawley, playing 62 times and scoring 11 goals, before moving up two divisions to sign for Championship club Ipswich Town in June 2018. He found first-team opportunities limited during his two years at Ipswich, during which he also spent time on loan at Lincoln City and Gillingham. Following his release from Ipswich, Roberts signed for Heart of Midlothian of the Scottish Championship in August 2020. Having spent two spells on loan at Scottish Premiership club Motherwell, Roberts joined the club on a permanent basis in January 2022. He signed for League Two club Stevenage in June 2022 and helped the club earn promotion into League One during the 2022–23 season.

== Club career ==
=== Aldershot Town ===
Roberts started his career in the youth team of Peterborough United as a first-year scholar. He was released by Peterborough in the summer of 2011 and joined League Two club Aldershot Town to complete the second year of his academy scholarship. Roberts signed his first professional contract with Aldershot on 21 February 2012, a two-and-a-half-year agreement. He made his Football League debut on 25 February 2012, coming on as an 87th-minute substitute for Guy Madjo in a 4–1 victory against Barnet. Roberts made four appearances during the end of the 2011–12 season, receiving the first red card of his career for two bookable offences in a 2–2 draw with Rotherham United on 28 April 2012.

==== Loan spells ====
Having made four further appearances for Aldershot at the start of the 2012–13 season, Roberts joined Conference South club Havant & Waterlooville on a one-month loan on 1 October 2012. He debuted for Havant & Waterlooville in a 2–2 draw with AFC Hornchurch on 6 October 2012, replacing Steve Ramsey in the 70th-minute of the match. Roberts made three appearances during the loan spell before returning to Aldershot upon the conclusion of the one-month agreement. He was loaned out for a second time on 10 January 2013, joining Tamworth of the Conference Premier until 9 February 2013. He made one appearance during his time there, playing the first 73 minutes in a 2–1 defeat against Gainsborough Trinity in the FA Trophy.

A third loan deal of the 2012–13 season followed when Roberts joined Conference South club Bishop's Stortford for the remainder of the season. Roberts made his Bishop's Stortford debut in a 1–1 draw against Hinckley United on 16 February 2013, replacing Alli Abdullahi with 30 minutes remaining. He scored his first goal in senior football in a 2–2 draw against Corby Town on 27 February 2013. Roberts made five appearances during his time at Bishop's Stortford, scoring once, before being recalled by Aldershot in March 2013. Roberts made two late substitute appearances at the end of a season in which Aldershot were relegated back to the Conference Premier.

==== Return to Aldershot ====
The 2013–14 season served as Roberts' breakthrough season in terms of regular first-team football. He scored his first goal for Aldershot in a 2–0 victory against Wrexham on 21 September 2013 and ended the season having scored seven times in 45 appearances. Roberts remained at Aldershot for the 2014–15 season, scoring six goals in 44 appearances as Aldershot finished in 18th position in the Conference Premier standings. He scored on his 100th appearance for Aldershot, his final game for the club, in a 3–1 away defeat to Grimsby Town on 25 April 2015.

=== Inverness Caledonian Thistle ===
Roberts went on trial with Scottish Premiership club Inverness Caledonian Thistle ahead of the 2015–16 season and scored in three successive pre-season friendlies, signing a contract with the club on 7 July 2015. He made his Inverness Caledonian Thistle debut in a UEFA Europa League qualifying match against Astra Giurgiu on 16 July 2015, in which he played the last nine minutes in a 1–0 defeat. Roberts suffered a groin injury before the start of the domestic season, ultimately ruling him out until January 2016. He scored his first goal for Inverness in a 2–1 away victory against Motherwell on 6 February 2016; his "magnificent long-range strike" in the 90th-minute of the match meant that Inverness progressed to the quarter final stage of the Scottish Cup. Roberts made 13 appearances during the season, scoring three goals. He left Inverness upon the expiry of his contract at the end of the season.

=== Crawley Town ===
Roberts joined League Two club Crawley Town on a free transfer on 28 June 2016, signing a one-year contract with the option of a further year. He made his debut for Crawley in their first match of the 2016–17 season, a 1–0 victory against Wycombe Wanderers. Roberts scored his first goal for Crawley in an FA Cup tie against Bristol Rovers on 15 November 2016, scoring the equalising goal in an eventual 4–2 extra-time defeat. He scored four goals in 26 appearances during his first year at Crawley, with the club taking up the option to extend his contract for a further 12 months. After scoring seven times in 36 appearances during the 2017–18 season, Crawley announced that Roberts would leave the club upon the conclusion of his contract in June 2018. He made 62 appearances during his two seasons at the club, scoring 11 goals.

=== Ipswich Town ===
Following his release from Crawley, Roberts moved up two divisions and signed for Championship club Ipswich Town on a two-year contract on 28 June 2018. He debuted for Ipswich in the club's first match of the 2018–19 season, coming on as an 82nd-minute substitute in a 1–0 away defeat to Rotherham United. Roberts found first-team opportunities limited under manager Paul Hurst, playing just 23 minutes in his two appearances before Hurst left the club in October 2018. He played a further 10 times during the first half of that season under new manager Paul Lambert, who played Roberts as a striker. Having not played for Ipswich in nearly a month, he joined League Two club Lincoln City on 23 January 2019, on loan until the end of the 2018–19 season. Roberts played a peripheral role during his time at Lincoln, making five substitute appearances as they earned promotion to League One after winning the League Two title.

Roberts returned to Ipswich upon the expiry of his loan deal at Lincoln and opened the 2019–20 season in the first-team squad at Ipswich. He scored twice in a 2–1 EFL Trophy victory against Tottenham Hotspur under-21s on 3 September 2019; the goals were his first for the club. Roberts scored three goals in the five matches he played for Ipswich during the first half of the 2019–20 season. Although his involvement was limited to three EFL Trophy appearances within the space of four months, Lambert stated that Roberts remained in his plans and praised his worth ethic in training.

==== Loan to Gillingham ====
Roberts joined League One club Gillingham on 9 January 2020, on a loan agreement for the remainder of the 2019–20 season. He debuted for Gillingham in a 0–0 draw with Peterborough United on 11 January 2020 and scored his first goals for the club as he scored both goals in a 2–2 away league draw at Rochdale on 25 January 2020. He scored twice during 10 appearances before returning from his loan on 6 May 2020. Ipswich decided against taking up the 12-month extension option on Roberts' contract, although stated a future deal may be possible once football resumed following its suspension due to the COVID-19 pandemic.

=== Heart of Midlothian ===
Having attracted transfer interest from several Football League clubs, Roberts signed a two-year contract with Scottish Championship club Heart of Midlothian on 10 August 2020. He made his Hearts debut against his former employers, Inverness, coming on a 63rd-minute substitute in a 1–0 victory at Tynecastle Park on 6 October 2020. Roberts made 11 appearances for Hearts during the first half of the 2020–21 season.

==== Loans to Motherwell ====
Roberts joined Scottish Premiership club Motherwell on a loan deal until the end of the season on 1 February 2021. He made his Motherwell debut as a 68th-minute substitute in a 2–1 defeat to Celtic on 6 February 2021. Roberts scored his first goal for the club on 27 February 2021, scoring the first goal of the match in a 2–0 away victory at Hibernian. A knee injury sustained in a 1–0 victory against St Mirren ruled him out for the remainder of the season. He scored three goals in eight appearances during his first loan spell at Motherwell; manager Graham Alexander described Roberts as "a brilliant man who did an exceptional job" during his four months there.

Ahead of the 2021–22 season, Roberts briefly returned to Hearts and made one substitute appearance in a Scottish League Cup match against Peterhead. It proved to be his only appearance for Hearts in the opening two months of the season and he returned to Motherwell on loan on 31 August 2021, on an agreement until January 2022.

=== Motherwell ===
Having made 11 appearances during his second loan spell at Motherwell, Roberts signed for the club on a permanent basis on 14 January 2022, on a deal until 2021–22 season. He played nine further times during the second half of that season, scoring twice, before Motherwell announced that Roberts would leave the club upon the expiry of his contract on 31 May 2022.

=== Stevenage ===
Roberts joined League Two club Stevenage on 17 June 2022. He had previously played under Stevenage manager Steve Evans during his time on loan at Gillingham and stated he felt Evans "gets the best out of him". He made his Stevenage debut in the club's first match of the 2022–23 season, when he came on as a 39th-minute substitute and scored the winning goal in a 2–1 away victory at Tranmere Rovers on 30 July 2022. After scoring five goals and providing one assist during October 2022, Roberts was nominated for the League Two Player of the Month. He made 53 appearances and scored 12 times as Stevenage earned promotion into League One after finishing the season in second place in League Two. Roberts signed an "improved and extended" contract on 20 July 2023.

== International career ==
Roberts received his first call up to the England C squad, who represent England at non-League level, in September 2014. He made his international debut on 14 October 2014 in a 2–0 defeat to Tunisia under-23s and scored his first international goal in a 2–1 victory against Republic of Ireland under-21s on 1 June 2015.

== Style of play ==
Predominantly deployed as a left-sided winger, Roberts has also been used centrally; either behind two front players or as a central striker. Left wing has been described as his strongest position, although he has also played as inverted right winger, allowing him to provide a different crossing angle. His directness of play has been highlighted as a strength due to his pace, as well as being described as "carrying a physical presence". Hearts manager Robbie Neilson stated Roberts possesses "real pace and power in the wide areas".

== Career statistics ==
As of end of 2025–26 season

Appearances and goals by club, season and competition
| Club | Season | League | | | National Cup | | League Cup | | Europe | | Other | | Total | |
| Club | Season | Division | Apps | Goals | Apps | Goals | Apps | Goals | Apps | Goals | Apps | Goals | Apps | Goals |
|---|---|---|---|---|---|---|---|---|---|---|---|---|---|---|
| Aldershot Town | 2011–12 | League Two | 4 | 0 | 0 | 0 | 0 | 0 | — | | 0 | 0 | 4 | 0 |
| Aldershot Town | 2012–13 | League Two | 5 | 0 | 0 | 0 | 1 | 0 | — | | 1 (Note: Appearance in Football League Trophy) | 0 | 7 | 0 |
| Aldershot Town | 2013–14 | Conference Premier | 39 | 6 | 2 | 0 | — | | — | | 4 (Note: Appearance(s) in FA Trophy) | 1 | 45 | 7 |
| Aldershot Town | 2014–15 | Conference Premier | 38 | 5 | 5 | 1 | — | | — | | 1 | 0 | 44 | 6 |
| Aldershot Town | Total | | 86 | 11 | 7 | 1 | 1 | 0 | 0 | 0 | 6 | 1 | 100 | 13 |
| Havant & Waterlooville (loan) | 2012–13 | Conference South | 3 | 0 | 0 | 0 | — | | — | | 0 | 0 | 3 | 0 |
| Tamworth (loan) | 2012–13 | Conference Premier | 0 | 0 | 0 | 0 | — | | — | | 1 | 0 | 1 | 0 |
| Bishop's Stortford (loan) | 2012–13 | Conference South | 5 | 1 | 0 | 0 | — | | — | | 0 | 0 | 5 | 1 |
| Inverness Caledonian Thistle | 2015–16 | Scottish Premiership | 9 | 2 | 3 | 1 | 0 | 0 | 1 (Note: Appearance in UEFA Europa League) | 0 | — | | 13 | 3 |
| Crawley Town | 2016–17 | League Two | 23 | 3 | 1 | 1 | 1 | 0 | — | | 1 (Note: Appearance(s) in EFL Trophy) | 0 | 26 | 4 |
| Crawley Town | 2017–18 | League Two | 35 | 6 | 1 | 1 | 0 | 0 | — | | 0 | 0 | 36 | 7 |
| Crawley Town | Total | | 58 | 9 | 2 | 2 | 1 | 0 | 0 | 0 | 1 | 0 | 62 | 11 |
| Ipswich Town | 2018–19 | Championship | 12 | 0 | 0 | 0 | 0 | 0 | — | | — | | 12 | 0 |
| Ipswich Town | 2019–20 | League One | 1 | 0 | 0 | 0 | 1 | 0 | — | | 3 | 3 | 5 | 3 |
| Ipswich Town | Total | | 13 | 0 | 0 | 0 | 1 | 0 | 0 | 0 | 3 | 3 | 17 | 3 |
| Lincoln City (loan) | 2018–19 | League Two | 5 | 0 | 0 | 0 | 0 | 0 | — | | 0 | 0 | 5 | 0 |
| Gillingham (loan) | 2019–20 | League One | 10 | 2 | 0 | 0 | 0 | 0 | — | | 0 | 0 | 10 | 2 |
| Heart of Midlothian | 2020–21 | Scottish Championship | 6 | 0 | 1 (Note: One appearance in the previous season's Scottish Cup which was rescheduled to October due to COVID-19) | 0 | 4 | 0 | — | | 0 | 0 | 11 | 0 |
| Heart of Midlothian | 2021–22 | Scottish Premiership | 0 | 0 | 0 | 0 | 1 | 0 | — | | 0 | 0 | 1 | 0 |
| Heart of Midlothian | Total | | 6 | 0 | 1 | 0 | 5 | 0 | 0 | 0 | 0 | 0 | 12 | 0 |
| Motherwell (loan) | 2020–21 | Scottish Premiership | 7 | 1 | 1 | 2 | 0 | 0 | 0 | 0 | — | | 8 | 3 |
| Motherwell (loan) | 2021–22 | Scottish Premiership | 11 | 0 | 0 | 0 | 0 | 0 | 0 | 0 | — | | 11 | 0 |
| Motherwell | 2021–22 | Scottish Premiership | 7 | 2 | 2 | 0 | 0 | 0 | 0 | 0 | — | | 9 | 2 |
| Motherwell | Total | | 25 | 3 | 3 | 3 | 0 | 0 | 0 | 0 | 0 | 0 | 28 | 5 |
| Stevenage | 2022–23 | League Two | 42 | 10 | 4 | 1 | 2 | 0 | — | | 5 | 1 | 53 | 12 |
| Stevenage | 2023–24 | League One | 46 | 5 | 4 | 1 | 2 | 1 | — | | 1 | 0 | 53 | 7 |
| Stevenage | 2024–25 | League One | 42 | 4 | 2 | 0 | 1 | 0 | — | | 3 | 0 | 48 | 4 |
| Stevenage | 2025–26 | League One | 39 | 2 | 1 | 0 | 0 | 0 | — | | 5 (Note: Three appearances in EFL Trophy, two appearances in EFL League Two play-offs) | 0 | 45 | 2 |
| Stevenage | Total | | 169 | 21 | 11 | 1 | 5 | 1 | 0 | 0 | 14 | 1 | 199 | 24 |
| Career total | | | 388 | 49 | 27 | 7 | 13 | 1 | 1 | 0 | 25 | 5 | 454 | 62 |

== Honours ==
Lincoln City

- EFL League Two: 2018–19

Stevenage

- EFL League Two runner-up: 2022–23
