= Jamie Young =

Australian footballer (born 1985)

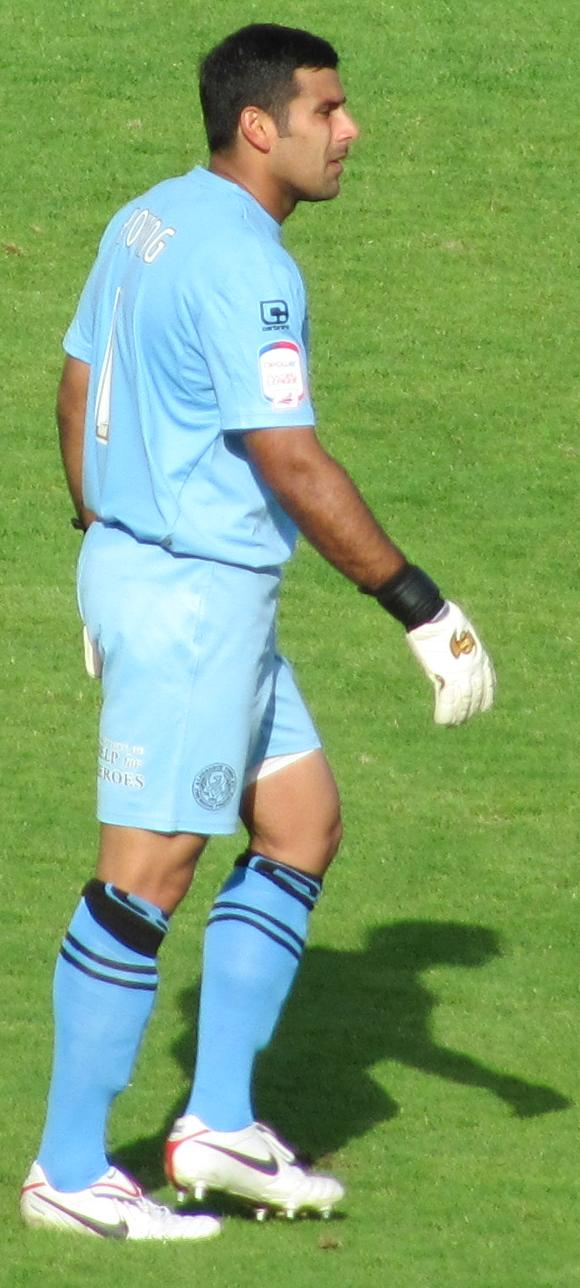
- Young playing for Aldershot Town in 2010

Personal information
- Full name: Jamie Iain Young
- Date of birth: 25 August 1985 (age 41)
- Place of birth: Brisbane, Australia
- Height: 5 ft 11 in (1.80 m)
- Position: Goalkeeper

Team information
- Current team: Dandenong Thunder

Youth career
- 2002–2003: Reading

Senior career*
Years	Team	Apps	(Gls)
2003–2006	Reading	1	(0)
2005–2006	→ Rushden & Diamonds (loan)	20	(0)
2006–2010	Wycombe Wanderers	39	(0)
2010–2013	Aldershot Town	124	(0)
2013	Basingstoke Town	1	(0)
2013	Whitehawk	1	(0)
2013–2014	Hayes & Yeading United	10	(0)
2014–2021	Brisbane Roar	144	(0)
2021–2023	Western United	56	(0)
2023–2025	Melbourne City	28	(0)
2025–	Dandenong Thunder	1	(0)

International career
2002–2003	England U18	3	(0)
2003	England U19	1	(0)
2005	England U20	4	(0)
- * Club domestic league appearances and goals as of 6 February 2025

Jamie Iain Young (born 25 August 1985) is a retired professional footballer who played as a goalkeeper. Born in Australia, he was a youth international for England.

== Early life and education ==
Young was born in Brisbane, Australia, and is of Sri Lankan and Scottish descent.

Young possesses a Bachelor in Exercise and Sport Science, with Young writing his dissertation on human genomic research in professional football. He had previously spent a number of years combining university studies with football commitments, and had temporarily placed his university studies on hold in July 2016 in order to focus on his football. Young is currently studying a PhD at the University of Queensland on the psychology of sports coaching, with a specific focus on the coach-athlete relationship in Australian football.

Young is an ambassador for the Multicultural Development Association, which helps refugees and migrants settle in Queensland.

== Career ==
=== Club career ===
Having grown up in Australia, he attended Padua College, where he played in the First 11 as Goalkeeper and also played at Pine Hills, Albany Creek, Easts and QAS at club level. Young moved to England in 2002 to play professional football for Reading. After failing to break into the first team, he was released by Reading on 8 May 2006, and subsequently signed a one-year deal with Wycombe Wanderers on 2 August 2006.

He missed much of the 2007–08 season with a knee injury, but regained fitness by the end of the season. His contract was cancelled by mutual consent in January 2010 after he was informed that he would not be offered a new contract in the summer. He was signed on a non-contract basis by Aldershot Town of League Two on 11 March 2010 as cover for goalkeeper Mikhael Jaimez-Ruiz.

After impressing and establishing himself as the first choice goalkeeper, in the last quarter of the 2009–10 season, where Aldershot Town qualified for the League Two play-offs, Young signed a one-year contract with the club in June 2010. With the arrival of new goalkeeper Ross Worner in the 2011–12 season, Young was demoted to second choice goalkeeper but still managed to make a number of appearances in the later stage of the season when Worner was ruled out with a back injury. On 24 June 2012, Young signed a one-year contract to keep him with Aldershot until 2013.

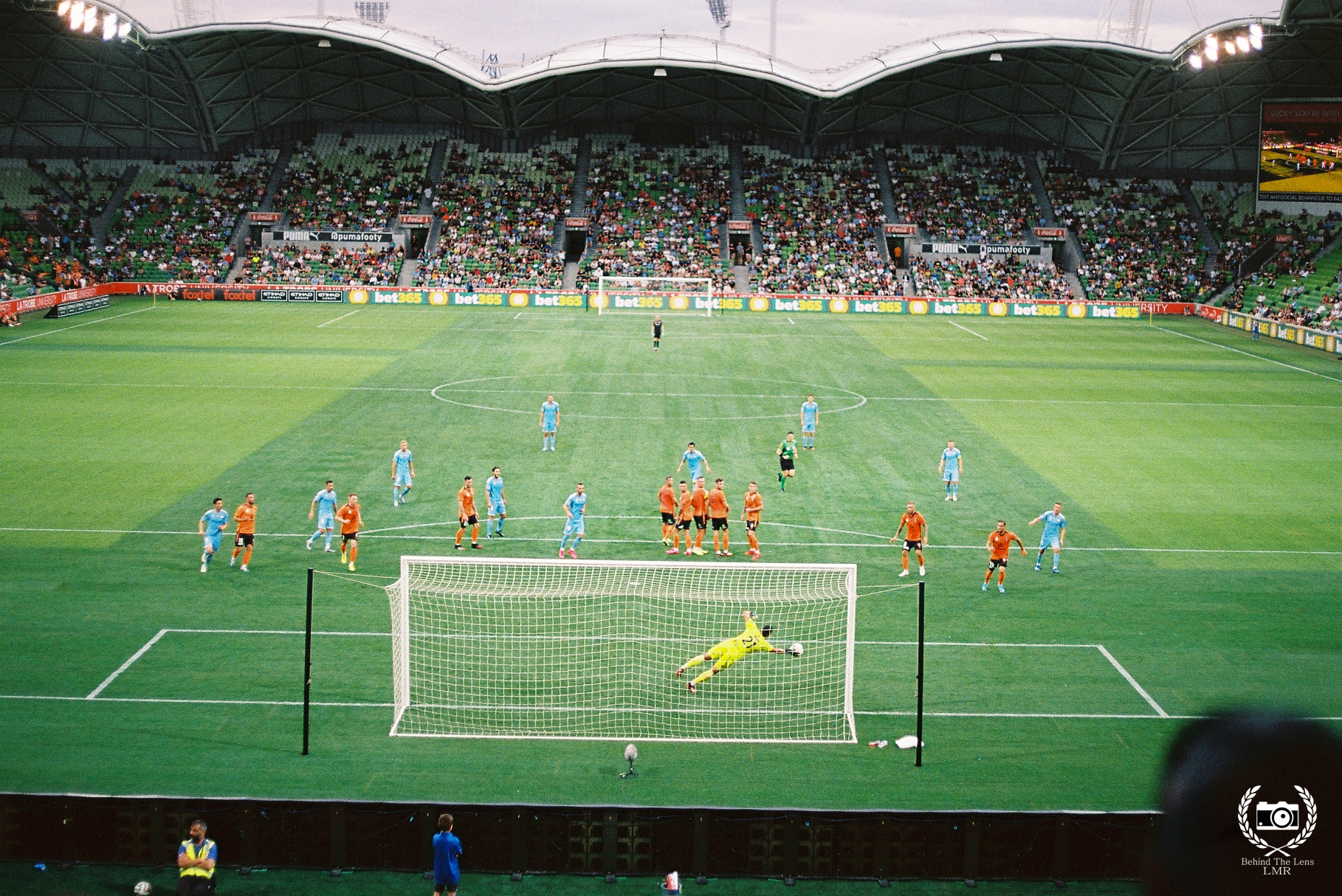
Jamie Young makes a save from a Melbourne City Free Kick 01.03.20

Young left Aldershot in June 2013 after the club were relegated from the Football League and placed in administration. He played one game for Basingstoke Town in September as cover for their regular goalkeeper before joining fellow Conference South side Whitehawk the following month. After making only one appearance he moved, this time joining Hayes & Yeading United. After making 10 appearances for Hayes & Yeading during its 2013–14 Conference South campaign, Young was released by manager Phil Babb following an on-field altercation with a teammate in a 2–0 defeat to Bath City.

On 10 May 2014, it was reported that Young would return to his hometown to join A-League defending champion Brisbane Roar for the 2014–15 season. Young struggled to adjust to the A-League with fans and even teammate Shane Stefanutto laying the blame on Young for the Roar's less than impressive start to the season. Young kept his first clean sheet in a 4–0 thrashing of the Newcastle Jets, courtesy of an Henrique hat-trick. Due to Michael Theo's wrist injury, sustained in pre-season training, Young played as the first choice goalkeeper for the majority of the season, even in the Elimination Final clash against Adelaide United in which Brisbane lost 2–1. Young played 24 matches for the Roar in the 2014–15 season, keeping five clean-sheets, as well as one clean-sheet in the ACL in Roar's 1–0 win against Urawa Reds.

After 7 seasons at Brisbane Roar, Young moved to Western United ahead of the 2021–22 season. Young spent two seasons at Western United, before departing at the conclusion of his initial two year contract at the conclusion of the 2022–23 season.

Young joined cross-town rivals Melbourne City after leaving Western United.

=== International career ===
Although born in Australia, Young played for the England national under-20 football team internationally.

=== Career statistics ===
As of match played 20 December 2020.

Club	Season	League			National Cup		League Cup		Continental		Total	
Club	Season	Division	Apps	CS	Apps	CS	Apps	CS	Apps	CS	Apps	CS
Reading	2003–04	First Division	1	0	0	0	0	0	—		1	0
Reading	2004–05	Championship	0	0	0	0	0	0	—		0	0
Reading	2005–06	Championship	0	0	0	0	0	0	—		0	0
Reading	Total		1	0	0	0	0	0	—		1	0
Rushden & Diamonds (loan)	2005–06	League Two	20	0	3	0	1	0	0	0	24	0
Wycombe Wanderers	2006–07	League Two	19	0	2	0	3	0	0	0	24	0
Wycombe Wanderers	2007–08	League Two	4	0	0	0	0	0	0	0	4	0
Wycombe Wanderers	2008–09	League Two	15	0	0	0	1	0	1 (Note: Appearance(s) in the Football League Trophy)	0	17	0
Wycombe Wanderers	2009–10	League One	1	0	0	0	1	0	1	0	3	0
Wycombe Wanderers	Total		59	0	5	0	6	0	2	0	72	0
Aldershot Town	2009–10	League Two	9	0	0	0	0	0	1 (Note: Appearance in the League Two play-offs)	0	10	0
Aldershot Town	2010–11	League Two	46	0	3	0	1	0	2	0	52	0
Aldershot Town	2011–12	League Two	25	0	3	0	1	0	1	0	30	0
Aldershot Town	2012–13	League Two	44	0	3	0	1	0	0	0	48	0
Aldershot Town	Total		124	0	9	0	3	0	4	0	140	0
Basingstoke Town	2013–14	Conference South	1	0	0	0	—		0	0	1	0
Whitehawk	2013–14	Conference South	1	0	0	0	—		0	0	1	0
Hayes & Yeading United	2013–14	Conference South	10	0	0	0	—		0	0	10	0
Brisbane Roar	2014–15	A-League	24	5	—		—		4	1	28	6
Brisbane Roar	2015–16	A-League	20	7	—		—		—	—	20	7
Brisbane Roar	2016–17	A-League	6	3	—		—		7	3	13	6
Brisbane Roar	2017–18	A-League	24	5	—		—		1	0	25	5
Brisbane Roar	2018–19	A-League	24	2	1	0	—		—	—	25	5
Brisbane Roar	2019–20	A-League	21	6	1	1	—		—	—	22	7
Career total			315	—	16	—	9	—	18	—	358	—

== Honours ==
Individual

- A-League Goalkeeper of the Year: 2017–18
- Brisbane Roar Gary Wilkins Medal: 2017–18, 2018–19
- A-Leagues All Star: 2022
- PFA A-League Men Team of the Season: 2017–18, 2019–20, 2021–22
