= Ben Herd =

English footballer (born 1985)

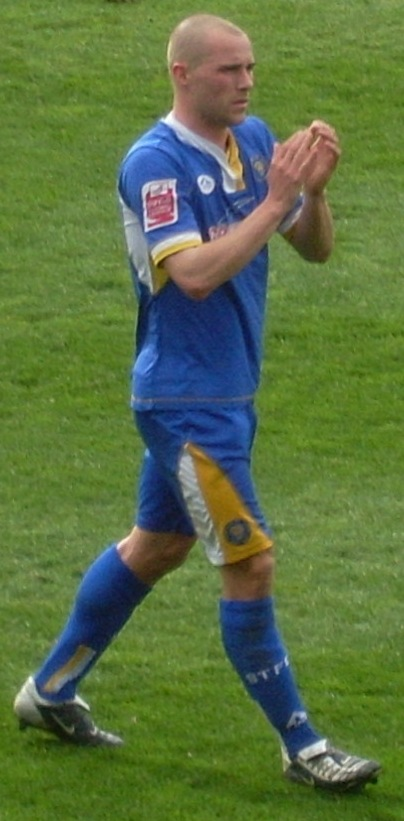
- Herd playing for Shrewsbury Town in 2008

Personal information
- Full name: Benjamin Alexander Herd
- Date of birth: 21 June 1985 (age 41)
- Place of birth: Welwyn Garden City, England
- Height: 5 ft 9 in (1.75 m)
- Position: Defender

Team information
- Current team: Hertford Town (player/manager)

Youth career
- –2003: Watford

Senior career*
Years	Team	Apps	(Gls)
2003–2005	Watford	0	(0)
2005–2009	Shrewsbury Town	143	(3)
2009–2013	Aldershot Town	151	(1)
2014–2015	Dunstable Town	27	(8)
2015	Boreham Wood	14	(0)
2015–2016	Hemel Hempstead Town	39	(5)
2016–2019	St Albans City	97	(1)
2019–	Hertford Town	206	(29)
Total		580	(46)

Managerial career
- 2019–: Hertford Town
- * Club domestic league appearances and goals

Benjamin Alexander Herd (born 21 June 1985) is an English former professional footballer who played as a defender, but could also play in midfield. He is player/manager of Hertford Town.

Starting his Football League career with Watford in 2003, he made his name at Shrewsbury Town between 2005 and 2009. In July 2009 he signed for Aldershot Town before dropping into non-league football.

== Playing career ==
=== Watford ===
Born in Welwyn Garden City, Hertfordshire, Herd began his career as a trainee at Watford. He signed his first professional contract with the Championship club in March 2003, but was released two years later, having never played a game for the club.

=== Shrewsbury Town ===
In June 2005, Herd signed for League Two club Shrewsbury Town, following a recommendation from Herd's former Watford manager Ray Lewington. He made his Shrewsbury début on 6 August in a 1–0 defeat at home to Rochdale. He was almost ever-present for Shrewsbury in his first season with the club.

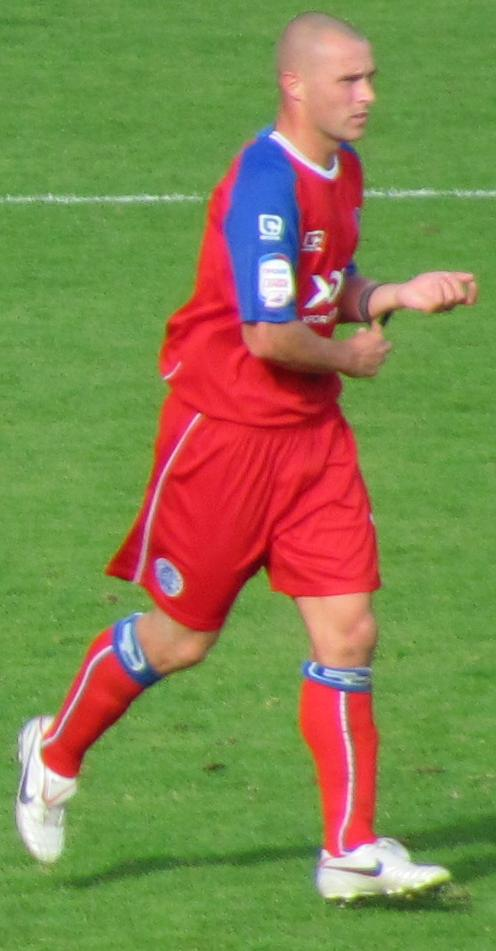
Herd playing in Aldershot Town's 1–0 defeat to Port Vale at Vale Park in 2010.

In the 2006–07 season injuries restricted Herd to 31 league appearances. However, he was a late inclusion in the Shrewsbury side for the League Two play-off final at Wembley, after Luke Jones picked up an injury in the warm-up; Shrewsbury lost the game 3–1. He signed a fresh two-year contract at the end of the season.

In the 2007–08 season, Herd was again almost ever-present, missing only one league match through suspension.

The 2008–09 season started well for Herd, but a suspension meant that he was replaced by Darren Moss. Moss maintained a rich vein of form, resulting in Herd making only five further appearances after mid-November; he was released at the season's end.

=== Aldershot Town ===
After receiving interest from numerous clubs, Herd signed a two-year contract with League Two side Aldershot Town in July 2009, to his great relief. He was voted Aldershot Town's player of the season in 2010, and players' player of the season the following year. At the end of the 2012–13 season, as a consequence of the club entering administration, Herd was released.

=== Dunstable Town ===
Herd signed for Southern League Premier Division side Dunstable Town in the summer of 2014, following the club's second promotion in a row from the Southern League Division One Central, immediately being handed the captaincy by manager Darren Croft. He made 27 league appearances during the 2014–2015 season, scoring eight goals.

=== Boreham Wood ===
Herd joined Boreham Wood in February 2015 and played a part in their promotion via the play-offs to the Conference Premier for the very first time. However, following the conclusion of the season, Herd left the club.

=== Hemel Hempstead Town ===
After leaving Boreham Wood, Herd signed for Conference South side Hemel Hempstead Town in June 2015.

=== St Albans City ===
After one season with Hemel Hempstead, Herd joined league counterparts St Albans City in May 2016 reuniting with his former Boreham Wood manager Ian Allinson. He remained at the club until the end of the 2018–19 season.

== Managerial career ==
In May 2019 Herd was named as the new manager of Hertford Town. Herd also regularly plays for Hertford - making over 200 appearances for the club.

== Personal life ==
In the summer of 2009, Herd helped to coach Shropshire youngsters, along with teammates David Edwards, Gavin Cowan, Stuart Whitehead and Ben Davies.
