= Jamie Collins (footballer, born 1984) =

English footballer (born 1984)

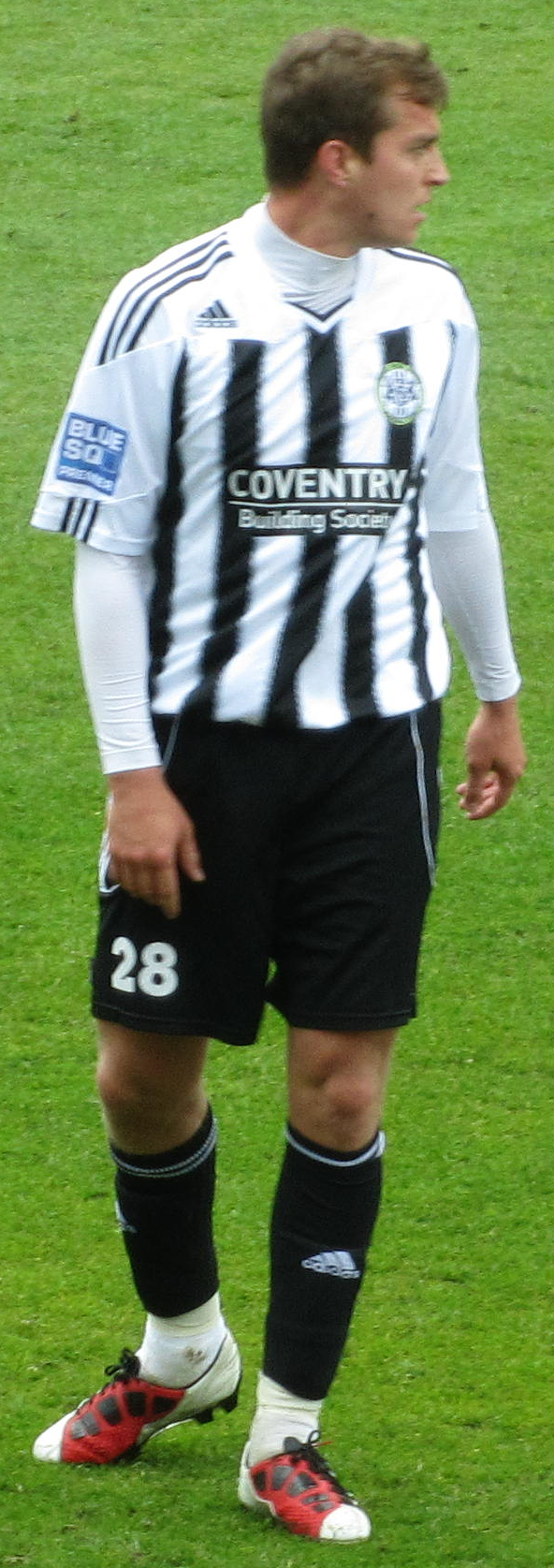
- Collins playing for Forest Green Rovers in 2012

Personal information
- Full name: James Edward Collins
- Date of birth: 28 September 1984 (age 42)
- Place of birth: Barking, England
- Height: 1.87 m (6 ft 1 1/2 in)
- Positions: Midfielder; defender

Youth career
- 2001–2003: Watford

Senior career*
Years	Team	Apps	(Gls)
2003–2005	Watford	0	(0)
2005–2009	Havant & Waterlooville	146	(12)
2009	Hampton & Richmond Borough	9	(0)
2009–2011	Newport County	69	(14)
2011–2012	Aldershot Town	25	(0)
2012–2013	Forest Green Rovers	33	(3)
2013–2015	Eastleigh	52	(5)
2015–2020	Sutton United	185	(25)
2021–2023	Havant & Waterlooville	23	(3)

Managerial career
- 2023: Havant & Waterlooville
- * Club domestic league appearances and goals as of 14:57, 10 March 2023 (UTC)

James Edward Collins (born 28 September 1984) is an English former semi-professional footballer who played as a defender. He was most recently manager of Havant & Waterlooville. Collins captained Sutton United in 2016-17 when they reached the 5th round of the FA Cup for the first time ever.

== Career ==
Collins began his youth career as a scholar at Watford, signing a professional contract with the club in June 2004. However, he failed to impress and was released the following February. Collins joined Havant & Waterlooville for the rest of the season, quickly impressing the fans and signing a full contract with the club in May 2005. Collins went on to play four seasons with The Hawks, becoming a first team regular and being rewarded with the captaincy for the 2007–08 season. In his first season as captain, Havant made a memorable run in the FA Cup, knocking out Football League sides Notts County and Swansea City to earn a fourth round tie away at Liverpool, in which they twice took the lead before losing 5–2.

After a disappointing 2008–09 campaign, Collins joined division rivals Hampton & Richmond Borough for an undisclosed fee. He spent just three months at the club before being signed by Newport County manager Dean Holdsworth, where he went on to be a key player in the 2009–10 season, as Newport won the Conference South title with a record 103 points.

In January 2011 Holdsworth became manager of League Two side Aldershot Town, and Collins followed his former boss five months later, signing on a free transfer at the end of the 2010–11 season.

On January transfer window deadline day on 31 January 2012, Collins signed for Forest Green Rovers on an 18-month contract for an undisclosed fee. Collins made his Forest Green debut on 18 February 2012 in a home win against Gateshead. In July 2012, Collins signed an extension to his contract at Forest Green which would see him stay at The New Lawn until the end of the 2013–14 season.

In May 2013, Collins and Forest Green agreed to the mutual termination of his contract and he moved to Eastleigh.

After being released by Eastleigh, Collins signed for Sutton United at the start of 2015, making 19 league appearances in the second half of the 2014–15 season and scoring his first goal for the club in a 2–1 victory against Basingstoke Town on 11 April 2015. Collins was appointed captain for the 2015–16 season, making 29 full and two substitute league appearances for the U's and scoring a further five goals, leading them to winning the National League South title. He was named in the National League South team of the season.

Remaining as Sutton captain for the 2016–17 season, Collins scored his first goal in the National League when he headed in a corner in a 3–1 victory against Lincoln City at Sincil Bank on 13 August 2016, helping Sutton to earn their first win in English football's fifth tier in 16 years. Sutton supporters unofficially voted Collins player of the month for September 2016 and again (now officially as a re-instituted award) for October 2016.

Collins made his 100th career appearance for Sutton on 3 December 2016 in a 2–1 win against League Two club Cheltenham Town in the 2nd round of the FA Cup. In the 4th round on 29 January 2017, Collins scored a calmly taken penalty to knock out Championship side Leeds United 1–0 and send Sutton through to the 5th round for the first time in the club's 118-year history. On 20 February, Collins captained Sutton when they were defeated 0–2 by Premier League team Arsenal. He finished the season with a tally of eight goals in the league and was named Club Player of the Year.

Collins scored his first goal in Sutton's 2017–18 campaign in their opening match, a 2–0 win against Leyton Orient, going on to lead Sutton to a best ever league finish of third in England's fifth tier and a playoff semi-final. The following season, Collins was captain as Sutton became the first English team to win a match in the Scottish Challenge Cup. He retired from professional football in early 2020 to serve as a coach/assistant manager under Matt Gray. In 2020–21, Collins was part of Gray's managerial team as Sutton won the National League and promotion to the Football League for the first time in the club's 123-year history. In June 2021 however, Collins stepped down from his coaching role.

== Coaching career ==
In June 2021, Collins came out of retirement to return to former club Havant & Waterlooville in a player-coach role, teaming up with his former Sutton manager Paul Doswell.

Following Paul Doswell's move to Director of Football, Collins was appointed manager on 10 March 2023. He was sacked by the club on 8 September 2023 following a poor start to the season that saw his side sitting bottom of the league with just four points from eight matches.

== Personal life ==
Before signing a professional contract with Aldershot, Collins worked as a primary school teacher. He has also worked as a football coach, and received an FA level 3 coaching badge during his time at Watford.

== Career statistics ==
As of match played 26 November 2019

Appearances and goals by club, season and competition
Club	Season	League			FA Cup		League Cup		Other		Total	
Club	Season	Division	Apps	Goals	Apps	Goals	Apps	Goals	Apps	Goals	Apps	Goals
Watford	2003–04	First Division	0	0	0	0	0	0	—		0	0
Watford	2004–05	Championship	0	0	0	0	0	0	—		0	0
Watford	Total		0	0	0	0	0	0	—		0	0
Havant & Waterlooville	2004–05	Conference South	11	0	—		—		1 (Note: Appearance in Conference League Cup)	0	12	0
Havant & Waterlooville	2005–06	Conference South	29	1	2	0	—		1 (Note: Appearances in FA Trophy)	0	32	1
Havant & Waterlooville	2006–07	Conference South	34	4	2	0	—		1	1	37	5
Havant & Waterlooville	2007–08	Conference South	37	2	6	1	—		1	0	44	3
Havant & Waterlooville	2008–09	Conference South	35	5	3	0	—		6 (Note: Three appearances and one goal in FA Trophy, two appearances and one goal in Conference League Cup, one in Hampshire Senior Cup)	2	44	7
Havant & Waterlooville	Total		146	12	13	1	—		10	3	169	16
Hampton & Richmond Borough	2009–10	Conference South	9	0	4	0	—		—		13	0
Newport County	2009–10	Conference South	24	4	—		—		4	0	28	4
Newport County	2010–11	Conference Premier	45	10	1	0	—		2	0	48	10
Newport County	Total		69	14	1	0	—		6	0	76	14
Aldershot Town	2011–12	League Two	25	0	3	0	4	0	1 (Note: Appearance in Football League Trophy)	0	33	0
Forest Green Rovers	2011–12	Conference Premier	12	2	—		—		—		12	2
Forest Green Rovers	2012–13	Conference Premier	21	1	0	0	—		1	0	22	1
Forest Green Rovers	Total		33	3	0	0	—		1	0	34	3
Eastleigh	2013–14	Conference South	30	2	2	1	—		5	2	37	5
Eastleigh	2014–15	Conference Premier	22	3	2	0	—		1	0	25	3
Eastleigh	Total		52	5	4	1	—		6	2	62	8
Sutton United	2014–15	Conference South	19	1	—		—		—		19	1
Sutton United	2015–16	National League South	31	5	4	0	—		5	1	40	6
Sutton United	2016–17	National League	43	8	7	1	—		4	0	54	9
Sutton United	2017–18	National League	42	2	2	0	—		3	0	47	2
Sutton United	2018–19	National League	33	6	2	1	—		1	0	36	7
Sutton United	2019–20	National League	17	3	0	0	—		1	0	18	3
Total			185	25	15	2	—		14	1	214	28
Career total			485	59	33	4	4	0	37	6	559	69

== Honours ==
Sutton United

- National League South: 2015–16
