= Jermaine McGlashan =

English footballer (born 1988)

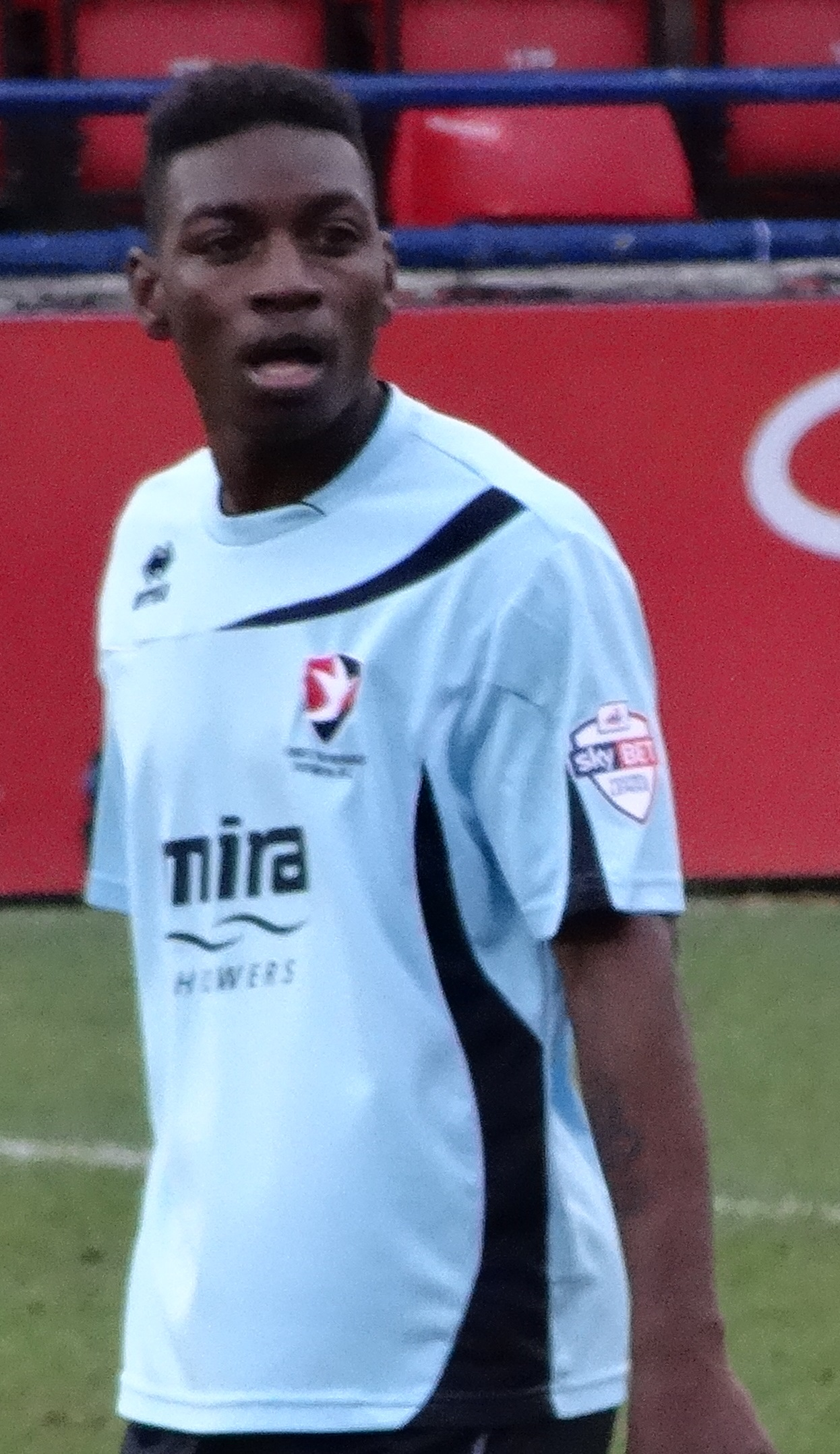
- McGlashan playing for Cheltenham Town in 2014

Personal information
- Full name: Jermaine Dave McGlashan
- Date of birth: 14 April 1988 (age 38)
- Place of birth: Croydon, England
- Height: 1.70 m (5 ft 7 in)
- Position: Midfielder

Youth career
- Tooting & Mitcham United
- –2006: Staines Town

Senior career*
| Years | Team | Apps | (Gls) |
| 2006–2008 | Staines Town | 2 | (0) |
| 2007–2008 | → Bracknell Town (dual registration) | | |
| 2008–2009 | Kingstonian | 0 | (0) |
| 2008–2009 | → Raynes Park Vale (loan) | | |
| 2009 | Merstham | 24 | (3) |
| 2009–2010 | Ashford Town (Middlesex) | 20 | (0) |
| 2010–2012 | Aldershot Town | 61 | (5) |
| 2012–2014 | Cheltenham Town | 104 | (12) |
| 2014–2016 | Gillingham | 57 | (5) |
| 2016–2018 | Southend United | 45 | (4) |
| 2018–2020 | Swindon Town | 24 | (0) |
| 2019 | → Wrexham (loan) | 7 | (1) |
| 2019–2020 | → Chesterfield (loan) | 14 | (0) |
| 2020 | Ebbsfleet United | 10 | (0) |
| 2020–2021 | Akritas Chlorakas | 12 | (0) |
| 2021–2022 | Maidstone United | 13 | (0) |
| 2022 | Leatherhead | 6 | (1) |
| Total | | 415 | (31) |

Managerial career
- 2022–2023: Fleet Town
- 2023–2024: AFC Croydon Athletic
- 2026: Gosport Borough
- * Club domestic league appearances and goals as of 20:35, 18 February 2022 (UTC)

Jermaine Dave McGlashan (born 14 April 1988) is an English former professional footballer who played as a midfielder and can play on either wing or behind the striker in an attacking midfield role. He also played up front on numerous occasions.

== Playing career ==
Born in Croydon, London, McGlashan started out in the youth team at Tooting & Mitcham United before moving to Staines Town's youth team.

In October 2006, McGlashan signed for the Staines Town first team, before being loaned out to Bracknell Town on dual registration terms. In the summer of 2008, he joined Kingstonian before being loaned out to Raynes Park Vale for the 2008–09 season. In July 2009, McGlashan moved on to Merstham before moving on again, this time joining Ashford Town (Middlesex) in December 2009.

In the summer of 2010, McGlashan had trials for Bristol Rovers, Hayes & Yeading United and Southampton before signing for Aldershot Town on a one-year deal. On 10 August, he made his professional debut, when he came on as a second half substitute against Watford in the League Cup.

On 20 January 2012, Cheltenham Town signed Jermaine McGlashan on a 2 1/2-year contract, fighting off competition from League Two rivals Gillingham, for a reported £50–60,000. He was the first Cheltenham player to be signed in a January transfer window requiring a fee. On 25 February 2012, McGlashan got his first Cheltenham Town goal in a 2–0 win over Burton Albion at home. McGlashan also won the club's Man of the Match award that day. McGlashan left the club at the end of the 2013–14 season after rejecting a new contract with the "Robins" and considered offers from numerous League One, Two and Scottish League sides. He then joined League One side Gillingham on a two-year contract. After his two-year spell at the club, he was released.

On 23 June 2016 McGlashan signed for League One side Southend United on a two-year contract, with the option of a third year. At the end of the 2017–18 season he was released by the club, following which he joined Swindon Town.

On 7 March 2019, McGlashan signed for Wrexham on loan from Swindon until the end of the 2018–19 season after manager Richie Wellens revealed he had no plans to include McGlashan in his squad for the following season and he was sent out on loan again to National League side Chesterfield until January 2020. McGlashan was released by Swindon in January 2020.

Following his release from Swindon, McGlashan joined Ebbsfleet United until the end of the 2019–20 season.

In September 2020, McGlashan announced that he had joined Cypriot Second Division side Akritas Chlorakas.

== Coaching career ==
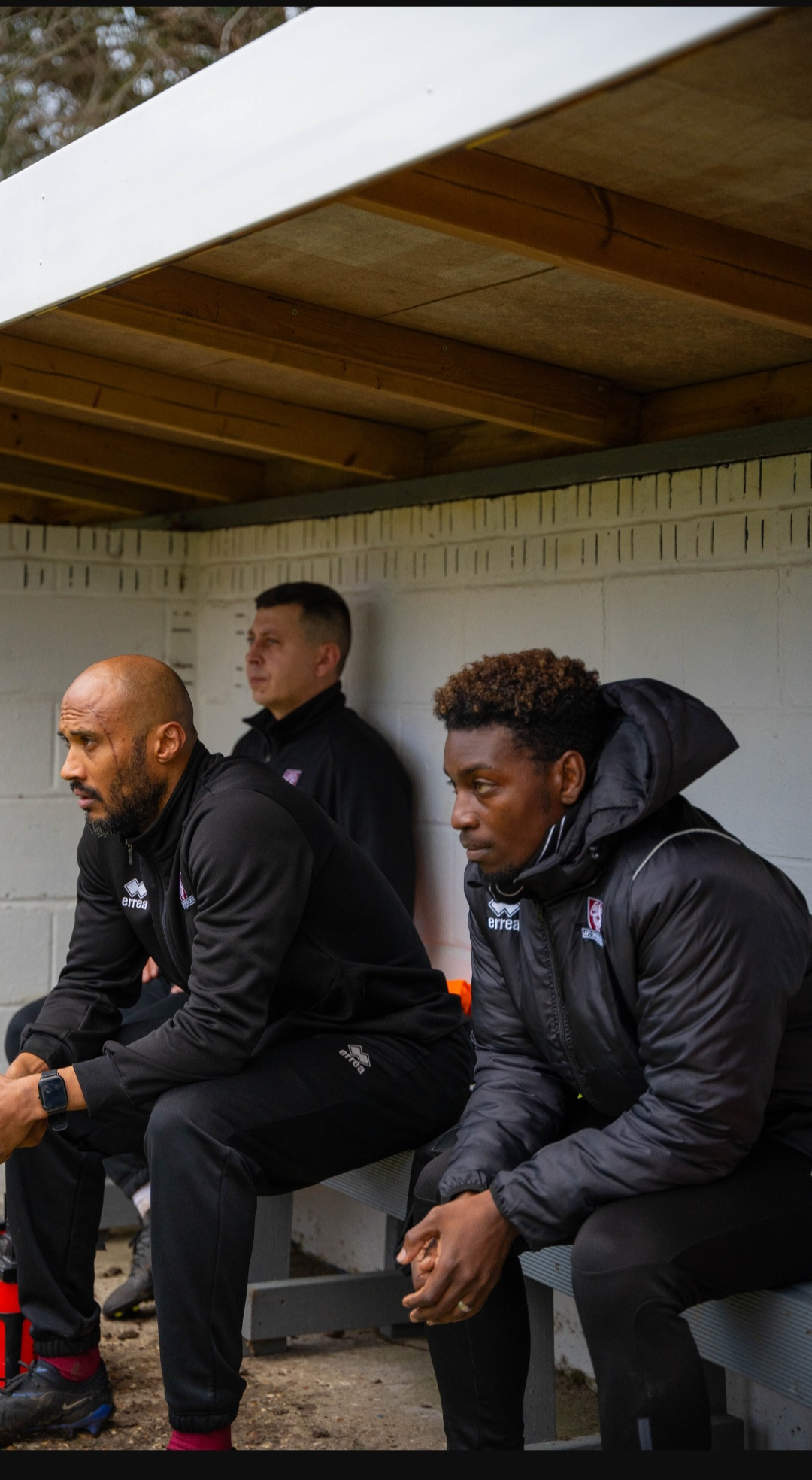
McGlashan (right) and Chris Zebroski (left) watching a match from the dugout

McGlashan was appointed joint manager of the under-18 team at Ashford Town (Middlesex) in June 2021. In the summer of 2021, he signed for National League South side Maidstone United following his return from Cyprus. Having been restricted to appearances mainly from the bench, he left for Isthmian League Premier Division side Leatherhead as player/assistant manager on 8 January 2022. In November 2022 he was appointed manager of Fleet Town.

In August 2023, he joined former club Gillingham with a coaching role in the academy as a part of the Premier League's and PFA's Player to Coach scheme. Alongside his academy work, McGlashan has also served as an elite development coach with AF Global in London, working with players in school-based programmes.

On 11 October 2023, McGlashan was appointed manager of Combined Counties League Premier Division South club AFC Croydon Athletic.

On 15 September 2024, McGlashan departed the club via mutual consent.

On 17 September 2026, McGlashan was appointed permanent manager of Southern League Premier Division South club Gosport Borough after a spell as caretaker manager.

On 7 October, McGlashan departed due to personal reasons.

== Career statistics ==
As of match played 13 February 2021.

| Club | Season | League | | | FA Cup | | League Cup | | Other | | Total | |
| Club | Season | Division | Apps | Goals | Apps | Goals | Apps | Goals | Apps | Goals | Apps | Goals |
|---|---|---|---|---|---|---|---|---|---|---|---|---|
| Aldershot Town | 2010–11 | League Two | 38 | 1 | 3 | 0 | 1 | 0 | 2 (Note: Appearance(s) in Football League Trophy) | 0 | 44 | 1 |
| Aldershot Town | 2011–12 | League Two | 23 | 4 | 3 | 0 | 4 | 0 | 1 | 0 | 31 | 4 |
| Aldershot Town | Total | | 61 | 5 | 6 | 0 | 5 | 0 | 3 | 0 | 75 | 5 |
| Cheltenham Town | 2011–12 | League Two | 16 | 2 | — | | — | | 3 (Note: Appearance(s) in League Two play-offs) | 2 | 19 | 4 |
| Cheltenham Town | 2012–13 | League Two | 45 | 4 | 3 | 0 | 1 | 0 | 2 | 0 | 51 | 4 |
| Cheltenham Town | 2013–14 | League Two | 43 | 6 | 0 | 0 | 2 | 0 | 1 | 0 | 46 | 6 |
| Cheltenham Town | Total | | 104 | 12 | 3 | 0 | 3 | 0 | 6 | 2 | 116 | 14 |
| Gillingham | 2014–15 | League One | 40 | 5 | 1 | 0 | 0 | 0 | 5 | 2 | 46 | 7 |
| Gillingham | 2015–16 | League One | 17 | 0 | 0 | 0 | 2 | 0 | 2 | 0 | 21 | 0 |
| Gillingham | Total | | 57 | 5 | 1 | 0 | 2 | 0 | 7 | 2 | 67 | 7 |
| Southend United | 2016–17 | League One | 35 | 3 | 1 | 0 | 1 | 0 | 1 (Note: Appearance(s) in EFL Trophy) | 0 | 38 | 3 |
| Southend United | 2017–18 | League One | 26 | 1 | 1 | 0 | 1 | 0 | 4 | 0 | 32 | 1 |
| Southend United | Total | | 61 | 4 | 2 | 0 | 2 | 0 | 5 | 0 | 70 | 4 |
| Swindon Town | 2018–19 | League Two | 24 | 0 | 1 | 0 | 1 | 0 | 2 | 0 | 28 | 0 |
| Swindon Town | 2019–20 | League Two | 0 | 0 | 0 | 0 | 1 | 0 | 1 | 0 | 2 | 0 |
| Swindon Town | Total | | 24 | 0 | 1 | 0 | 2 | 0 | 3 | 0 | 30 | 0 |
| Wrexham (loan) | 2018–19 | National League | 7 | 1 | 0 | 0 | — | | 1 | 0 | 8 | 1 |
| Chesterfield (loan) | 2019–20 | National League | 14 | 0 | 1 | 0 | — | | 0 | 0 | 15 | 0 |
| Ebbsfleet United | 2019–20 | National League | 10 | 0 | 0 | 0 | — | | 2 | 0 | 12 | 0 |
| Akritas Chlorakas | 2020–21 | Cypriot Second Division | 12 | 0 | 1 | 0 | — | | 0 | 0 | 13 | 0 |
| Maidstone United | 2021–22 | National League South | 13 | 0 | 2 | 0 | — | | 0 | 0 | 15 | 0 |
| Career total | | | 363 | 27 | 17 | 0 | 14 | 0 | 27 | 4 | 420 | 31 |

== Personal life ==
McGlashan was born in England and is of Grenadian descent.

He graduated in 2022 from Staffordshire University with a degree in Professional Sports Writing and Broadcasting.
