= Graeme Montgomery =

English footballer (born 1988)

Personal information
- Full name: Graeme Montgomery
- Date of birth: 3 March 1988 (age 38)
- Place of birth: Enfield, England
- Height: 1.85 m (6 ft 1 in)
- Position: Midfielder

Team information
- Current team: St Albans

Senior career*
Years	Team	Apps	(Gls)
2005–2009	Wealdstone		
2009–2011	Dagenham & Redbridge	22	(2)
2010	→ Hayes & Yeading United (loan)	3	(0)
2011	→ Newport County (loan)	8	(0)
2011	Aldershot Town	0	(0)
2011	→ Eastleigh (loan)	7	(1)
2011–2012	Eastleigh	14	(3)
2012–2015	Boreham Wood	147	(34)
2015	→ St Albans (loan)	4	(0)
2015–2016	Hemel Hempstead Town	36	(11)
2016–2017	St Albans	0	(0)
2017	→ Hayes & Yeading United (loan)		
2017	Biggleswade Town		
- * Club domestic league appearances and goals as of 4 June 2024 (UTC)

Graeme Montgomery (born 3 March 1988) is an English retired footballer who played as a midfielder.

He played for National League South side St Albans City on loan from Boreham Wood, following his release from Eastleigh on 24 February 2012. He then joined the Saints rivals, Hemel Hempstead Town FC, after being transferred from Boreham Wood. Graeme then signed the Saints for an undisclosed fee at the beginning of December 2016.

== Career ==
He made his debut for Dagenham & Redbridge in a League Two match, in the 1–1 draw away at Barnet on 17 January 2009, coming on as a substitute in the 89th minute for Jon Nurse.

In the 2009–10 season, Montgomery broke into the Daggers team. He started a league game for them and on 17 April 2010, he scored his first ever Football League goal. This came in the 95th minute, after he came on as a substitute for Josh Scott in the 2–1 home victory against Burton Albion.

On 18 November 2010, he was loaned out to Hayes & Yeading United for one month. After the deal ran out, on 30 December, Montgomery was signed by Newport County on another loan until the end of the season. In May 2011, Dagenham announced the release of Montgomery at the end of his contract.

Montgomery initially joined Conference South side Eastleigh from Aldershot Town on loan on 16 September 2011. The loan was initially for 1 month, but following impressive performances, the loan was extended by an extra month twice, until Montgomery was released by Aldershot and joined Eastleigh on a contract until the end of the 2011/12 season on 16 December 2011. This was short-lived, as due to new arrivals at the club, he lost his place in the starting line up, and was eventually released from Eastleigh on 24 February 2012.

Montgomery signed for Boreham Wood on 5 March 2012.

== Honours ==
Dagenham & Redbridge

- Football League Two play-offs: 2010
