= Wilko Risser =

Namibian footballer (born 1982)

Personal information
- Full name: Wilko Rudi Risser
- Date of birth: 11 August 1982 (age 44)
- Place of birth: Windhoek, South West Africa, South Africa
- Height: 1.92 m (6 ft 4 in)
- Position: Forward

Youth career
- –2003: Ramblers Windhoek

Senior career*
Years	Team	Apps	(Gls)
2002–2003	Ramblers Windhoek		
2003–2004	SpVgg EGC Wirges		
2004–2006	FV Engers	34	(5)
2006–2007	SG Eintracht Lahnstein	31	(20)
2007–2008	FC Schalke 04 II	30	(4)
2008–2010	SV Eintracht Trier 05	62	(19)
2010–2011	SV Elversberg 07	25	(0)
2011–2012	Floriana	1	(0)
2012	Aldershot Town	16	(3)
2012–2013	Chippa United	2	(0)

International career^{‡}
2007–2011	Namibia	14	(5)
- * Club domestic league appearances and goals as of 16:45, 5 May 2012 (UTC) ‡ National team caps and goals as of 22:41, 27 March 2012 (UTC)

Wilko Rudi Risser (born 11 August 1982) is a Namibian footballer former professional footballer who played as a forward. He represented Namibia internationally and played in Germany, Malta, England, and South Africa.

== Club career ==
Wilko Risser began his career with Ramblers Windhoek to kick-start his football career and played for until 2003. For 2003/04 season he moved to Germany to SpVgg EGC Wirges. Since he could not prevail there, he moved to another German FV Engers in the 2004/05 season. Once there, but he was not a regular player, he left FV Engers in 2006 and moved to SG Eintracht Lahnstein, where in the 2006/07 season, he scored 20 goals before switching to FC Schalke 04 II. That he left after the 2007/08 season again. On 5 August 2008 he signed with the regional division club SV Eintracht Trier 05 a new contract. For 2010/11 season he was awarded a new contract in Trier and moved to SV Elversberg 07, when his contract was not extended.

After several months without a club he signed in early December 2011 a contract with the Floriana in Malta but left the club after making one appearance on his debut for Floriana after coming on as a substitute for Ryan Darmanin in a 0–0 draw on 3 December 2011.

=== Aldershot Town ===
Risser signed for Aldershot Town on a short-term deal until the end of the season in February 2012 after a following successful trials. Manager Dean Holdsworth believed Risser would give his side great impetus going forward and Holdsworth also spoke of Risser's experience. "Wilko gives us something different for our strikers to play-off. When I made a phone call to his agent within 20 minutes Wilko was on a plane and made himself available. Currently he is on a short-term contract but he could become a good asset for us. He is well travelled and he wants to prove a few things to people and we can take advantage of that."

The day after signing for the club, he made his debut on 14 February 2012 in a 1–0 home win against Hereford United. 4 Days later on 18 February 2012, Risser provided an assist for Aaron Morris to score a 65th-minute goal which was a winner against Macclesfield Town. On 17 March 2012, Risser scored his first goal for Aldershot which was a winning goal against Bradford City which the match ended 1–0. His second goal came when Risser scored the only goal for Aldershot in a match against League Two struggler Port Vale which Aldershot lose 2–1. His third goal came when Risser scored his third goal and second in the match against Burton Albion in a 4–0 win on 21 April 2012.

Having established a starting berth in Holdsworth side for each of the last four matches – his longest sequence since joining the Shots, Risser is keen to stay at Aldershot at the club – for the next season. Eventually, manager Dean Holdsworth agreed with Risser by offering him a new contract. Despite the ongoing negotiations, Risser left the club.

=== Chippa United ===
After leaving Aldershot Town, Risser went on trial with South African Premier Soccer League side Bloemfontein Celtic. Instead, he move to South African Premier Soccer League side Chippa United, until the end of the season. After making one appearance, which turns out to be his last appearance, Risser then left the club

== International career ==
Born in South West Africa (now Namibia), Risser is of German descent on his family side and has dual German citizenship. Risser has been a member of the Namibia national football team since June 2007. On May 31, 2008, Risser scored his first goal for Namibia in the 14th minute against Kenya, in a 2–1 victory in the qualification matches for the 2010 FIFA World Cup.

== Personal life ==
Wilko is the brother of fellow Brave Warrior Oliver Risser. He carries a German passport.

== Honours ==
SV Eintracht Trier 05

- Rhineland Cup: 2009, 2010
