= 2012–13 Aldershot Town F.C. season =

Aldershot Town F.C.
2012–13 season
- Chairman: Kris Machala
- Manager: Dean Holdsworth
- Stadium: Recreation Ground
- Football League Two: 24th (Relegated to Conference National)
- FA Cup: Fourth round (eliminated by Middlesbrough)
- Football League Cup: First round (eliminated by Wolves)
- Football League Trophy: Second round (eliminated by Plymouth Argyle)
Home colours	Away colours

The 2012–13 season is the 21st year of football played by Aldershot Town F.C. and their 5th in The Football League.

== Match results ==
=== Football League Two ===
==== League table ====
Pos	Team	Pld	W	D	L	GF	GA	GD	Pts	Promotion, qualification or relegation
20	AFC Wimbledon	46	14	11	21	54	76	−22	53	
21	Plymouth Argyle	46	13	13	20	46	55	−9	52	
22	Dagenham & Redbridge	46	13	12	21	55	62	−7	51	
23	Barnet (R)	46	13	12	21	47	59	−12	51	Relegation to the Conference Premier
24	Aldershot Town (R)	46	11	15	20	42	60	−18	48	Relegation to the Conference Premier

Updated to match(es) played on 27 April 2013. Source: BBC Sport
Rules for classification: 1) Points; 2) Goal difference; 3) Number of goals scored
(R) Relegated

=== FA Cup ===
Competition	Date	Opponent	Venue	Result	Attendance	Scorers
First round	3 November 2012	Hendon	Home	2–1	1,822	Danny Hylton (x2)
Second round	1 December 2012	Fleetwood Town	Away	3–2	1,757	Danny Hylton (x2), Peter Vincenti
Third round	5 January 2013	Rotherham United	Home	3–1	2,992	Danny Hylton (x3)
Fourth round	26 January 2013	Middlesbrough	Away	1–2	12,684	Danny Hylton

=== Football League Cup ===
Competition	Date	Opponent	Venue	Result	Attendance
First round	11 August 2012	Wolverhampton Wanderers	Away	1–1 (6–7 p)	11,555

=== Football League Trophy ===
Competition	Date	Opponent	Venue	Result	Attendance
First round	4 September 2012	Exeter City	Away	0–0 (4–3 p)	1,944 (71 away fans)
Second round	9 October 2012	Plymouth Argyle	Away	1–2	2,590 (78 away fans)
