= List of Aldershot Town F.C. seasons =

Aldershot Town Football Club, is a professional association football club based in Aldershot, Hampshire, England, was founded in 1992 after the closure of debt-ridden Aldershot Football Club.

== Key ==
Key to positions and symbols

- 1st = Champions
- 2nd = Runners-up
- ↑ = Promoted
- ↓ = Relegated
- * = Qualified for the play-offs

Key to rounds

- QR = Qualifying round
- QR1 = First qualifying round, etc.
- R1 = First round, etc.
- QF = Quarter-finals
- SF = Semi-finals
- RU = Runners-up
- W = Winners

== Seasons ==
Season	League record									FA Cup	EFL Cup	EFL Trophy	FA Trophy	Other		Top goalscorer	
Season	Division (Note: Divisions are sorted according to their level within the English football league system at the time which are shown in parentheses.)	P	W	D	L	F	A	Pts	Pos	FA Cup	EFL Cup	EFL Trophy	FA Trophy	Competition	Result	Name	Goals
1992–93	Isthmian League Third Division (9) ↑	38	28	8	2	90	35	92	1st	—	—	—	—	Hampshire Senior Cup	SF	Steve Stairs	32
1993–94	Isthmian League Second Division (8) ↑	42	30	7	5	78	27	97	3rd	—	—	—	—	FA Vase	QF	Mark Butler	35
1994–95	Isthmian League First Division (7)	42	23	5	14	80	53	74	4th	QR1	—	—	QR3	Hampshire Senior Cup	SF	Mark Butler	33
1995–96	Isthmian League First Division (7)	42	21	9	12	81	46	72	5th	QR4	—	—	QR3	Hampshire Senior Cup	QF	Mark Butler	33
1996–97	Isthmian League First Division (7)	42	19	14	9	65	45	71	7th	QR2	—	—	QR3	—	—	Roy Young	15
1997–98	Isthmian League First Division (7) ↑	42	28	8	6	89	36	92	1st	QR1	—	—	QR3	Hampshire Senior Cup	SF	Roy Young	27
1998–99	Isthmian League Premier Division (6)	42	16	14	12	83	48	62	7th	QR4	—	—	R4	Hampshire Senior Cup	W	Gary Abbot	48
1999–2000	Isthmian League Premier Division (6)	42	24	5	13	71	51	77	2nd	R2	—	—	R4	Hampshire Senior Cup	W	Gary Abbot	45
2000–01	Isthmian League Premier Division (6)	41 (Note: On 9 April the Isthmian League EGM decided that, despite continual bad weather, the season would finish on 5 May as planned. Aldershot Town tried to arrange for the unplayed match to be played on the evening of 5 May, but Billericay Town refused to accommodate this arrangement. The Isthmian League Management Committee subsequently convened and ruled that no points would be allocated to either team.)	21	11	9	73	39	74	4th	R1	—	—	R3	—	—	Gary Abbot	27
2001–02	Isthmian League Premier Division (6)	42	22	7	13	76	51	73	3rd	R1	—	—	R3	Hampshire Senior Cup	W	Stafford Browne	30
2002–03	Isthmian League Premier Division (6) ↑	46	33	6	7	81	36	105	1st	QR4	—	—	R1	Hampshire Senior Cup	W	Roscoe Dsane	18
2003–04	Conference (5)	42	20	10	12	80	67	70	5th*	R2	—	—	SF	Conference National play-offs	RU	Roscoe Dsane	27
2004–05	Conference National (5)	42	21	10	11	68	52	73	4th*	R2	—	R1	R3	Conference National Play-offs	SF (Note: Lost in the play-off semi-final to Carlisle United 5–4 in a penalty shoot-out after the aggregate score remained at 2–2 after extra time in the second leg.)	Tim Sills	18
2005–06	Conference National (5)	42	16	6	20	61	74	54	13th	R2	—	R1	R3	Hampshire Senior Cup	QF	Tim Sills	11
2006–07	Conference National (5)	46	18	11	17	64	62	65	9th	R3	—	—	R3	Hampshire Senior Cup	W	John Grant	23
2007–08	Conference National (5) ↑	46	31	8	7	82	48	101	1st	R1	—	—	SF	Conference League Cup	W	John Grant	25
2008–09	League Two (4)	46	14	12	20	59	80	54	15th	R2	R1	R2	—	—	—	Scott Davies	14
2009–10	League Two (4)	46	20	12	14	69	56	72	6th*	R2	R1	R1	—	League Two play-offs	SF (Note: Lost in the play-off semi-final to Rotherham United 3–0 on aggregate.)	Marvin Morgan	16
2010–11	League Two (4)	46	14	19	13	54	54	61	14th	R2	R1	R2	—	—	—	Luke Guttridge	8
2011–12	League Two (4)	46	19	9	18	54	52	66	11th	R2	R4	R2	—	—	—	Danny Hylton	16
2012–13	League Two (4) ↓	46	11	15	20	42	60	48	24th	R4	R1	R2	—	—	—	Craig Reid	12
2013–14	Conference National (5)	46	16	13	17	69	62	51 (Note: Aldershot Town deducted ten points for entering administration)	19th	QR4	—	—	R4	—	—	—	—
2014–15	Conference National (5)	46	14	11	21	51	61	53	18th	R2	—	—	R1	—	—	Brett Williams	15
2015–16	National League (5)	46	16	8	22	54	72	56	15th	R1	—	—	R1	—	—	Charlie Walker	14
2016–17	National League (5)	46	23	13	10	66	37	82	5th	QR4	—	—	R1	National League play-offs	SF (Note: Lost in the play-off semi-final to Tranmere Rovers 5–2 on aggregate.)	Scott Rendell	13
2017–18	National League (5)	46	20	15	11	64	52	75	5th*	R1	—	—	R1	National League play-offs	QR (Note: Lost in the play-off qualifying round to Ebbsfleet United 5–4 in a penalty shoot-out after the match had finished 1–1 after extra time.)	Scott Rendell	12
2018–19	National League (5)	46	11	11	24	38	67	44	21st (Note: Gateshead were demoted to the National League North on 8 June 2019 because of financial irregularities. As a result Aldershot Town were given a reprieve from relegation.)	R1	—	—	R1	—	—	Scott Rendell	7
2019–20	National League (5)	39	12	10	17	43	55	46	18th (Note: Season was curtailed in April 2020 on account of the COVID-19 pandemic with league positions being determined on a points-per-game basis.)	QR4	—	—	R1	—	—	Ethan Chislett	9
2020–21	National League (5)	42	15	7	20	59	66	52	15th	QR4	—	—	QF	—	—	Harry Panayiotou	12
2021–22	National League (5)	44	11	10	23	46	73	43	20th	QR4	—	—	R4	—	—	Corie Andrews	9
2022–23	National League (5)	46	14	11	21	64	76	53	18th	QR4	—	—	QF	—	—	Inih Effiong	17
2023–24	National League (5)	46	20	9	17	74	83	69	8th	R3	—	—	R4	—	—	Lorent Tolaj	19
2024–25	National League (5)	46	14	15	17	69	83	57	16th	R1	—	—	W	—	—	Josh Barrett	16
