= Louie Soares =

Barbadian footballer (born 1985)

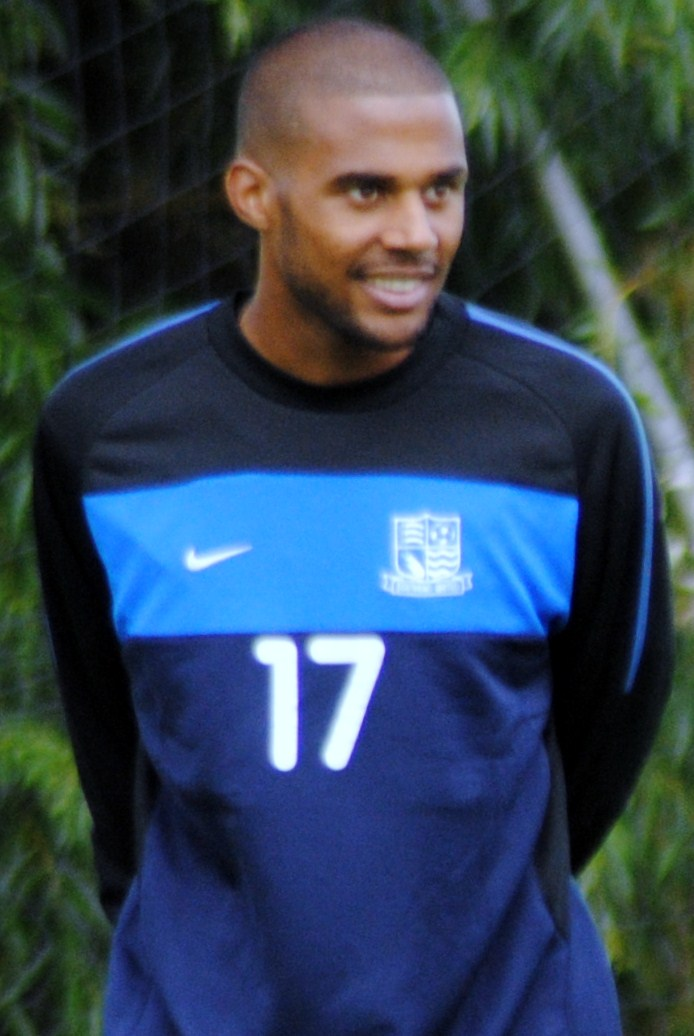

Personal information
- Date of birth: 8 January 1985 (age 41)
- Place of birth: Reading, England
- Position: Midfielder

Youth career
- Reading

Senior career*
Years	Team	Apps	(Gls)
2004–2005	Reading	0	(0)
2005	→ Tamworth (loan)	6	(0)
2005	Bristol Rovers	1	(0)
2005–2006	Barnet	20	(1)
2006–2010	Aldershot Town	147	(17)
2010–2011	Southend United	31	(0)
2011–2012	Hayes & Yeading United	31	(15)
2012–2013	Grimsby Town	15	(0)
2012	→ Ebbsfleet United (loan)	8	(0)
2013	→ Alfreton Town (loan)	18	(2)
2013	Hayes & Yeading United	9	(3)
2013–2016	Basingstoke Town	101	(12)
2016	Oxford City	8	(1)
2016–2018	Hungerford Town	68	(20)
2018–2019	Slough Town	25	(1)
2019–2020	Hampton & Richmond Borough	18	(2)
2020	Slough Town	1	(0)
2020	→ Biggleswade Town (loan)	1	(0)
2020	→ Staines Town (loan)	1	(0)
2020–2021	Bracknell Town	0	(0)
Total		509	(74)

International career^{‡}
2007	Barbados	2	(1)
- * Club domestic league appearances and goals as of 21:13, 12 February 2020 (UTC) ‡ National team caps and goals as of 11:00, 4 June 2007 (UTC)

Louie Soares (born 8 January 1985) is a former professional footballer who played as a midfielder.

He notably played as a professional for Reading, Bristol Rovers, Barnet, Aldershot Town, Southend United and Grimsby Town, as well as in Non-league football for Tamworth, Hayes & Yeading United, Ebbsfleet United, Alfreton Town, Basingstoke Town, Oxford City, Hungerford Town, Slough Town, Hampton & Richmond Borough, Biggleswade Town, Staines Town and Bracknell Town. He was capped twice by Barbados and scored one goal.

== Club career ==
=== Early career ===
Soares' career began as a trainee right-back at his home town club, Reading, who also allowed him to make a loan spell to Tamworth, where he made six appearances (including five starts). At Reading, Soares was tutored by his club captain, Graeme Murty, as he was the senior right back at the club.

=== Barnet ===
At the end of the 2004–05 season, Soares was released by Reading, he signed for Bristol Rovers however this move didn't work out and he eventually signed for Barnet. He was granted a contract extension in January 2006 where he made 25 appearances, scoring once in the whole of the 2005–06 season. Despite this, Barnet allowed him to leave at the end of that season, whereupon he joined Aldershot.

=== Aldershot ===
He signed for the Shots in May 2006 having worked with previously with Martin Kuhl at Reading. While at Aldershot, he made his first International appearance, made over 148 appearances and scored 17 goals.

=== Southend United ===
On 21 July 2010 Soares signed a pre contract agreement with Southend United and his registration was completed when the club's transfer embargo was lifted on 6 August 2010. Soares scored his first goal for the club on 5 October 2010 in a 3–1 win over Barnet in the Football League Trophy. In May 2011 he was one of five players told they were to be released by the club. going on to make 32 appearances before being released in the summer.

=== Hayes & Yeading United ===
He subsequently joined Conference National side Hayes & Yeading United on a free transfer. He made 31 appearances and scored 15 goals.

=== Grimsby Town ===
On 31 January 2012, transfer deadline day, Soares signed for Grimsby Town on an 18-month permanent contract, being unveiled by the club at midday. In September 2012 after failing to hold down a regular place in the Grimsby midfield for the remainder of the 2011–12 and beginning of the 2012–13 season Soares was made available for loan. Soares joined Ebbsfleet United on a month's loan on 28 September 2012. On 26 October Soares extended his loan period by a further month. On 17 January 2013 Soares joined Alfreton Town on loan for the remainder of the 2012–13 season.

Soares played 18 times for Alfreton, scoring twice, he returned to Grimsby at the end of the season and was released on 2 May 2013.

=== Non-League ===
In July 2013 he joined Woking on trial. In August 2013 he joined former club Hayes & Yeading United on trial and scored the winner in the club's final pre-season match, a 2–1 win away at Arlesey Town, eventually signing with the club on a permanent deal.

In December 2013 Soares signed for Basingstoke Town on a non-contract basis. He scored on his debut in a win against Farnborough. He later had spells with Oxford City and Hungerford Town before signing with Slough Town in June 2018. Soares joined Hampton & Richmond Borough for the 2019–20 season. After 21 appearances and two goals, he left the club in January and re-joined Slough. On 4 February 2020, Soares along with his teammate Scott Davies joined Southern League Premier Division Central side Biggleswade Town on loan. The following week, he joined Staines Town on dual registration.

Soares joined Bracknell Town on 26 February 2020.

== International career ==
Soares was called up by Barbados for the 2007 Caribbean Nations Cup tournament, and became the first Aldershot player, whilst playing for the club, to be capped when he played against Trinidad and Tobago on 12 January 2007.

== Career statistics ==
As of match played 26 December 2013.

Club	Season	League			FA Cup		League Cup		Other		Total	
Club	Season	Division	Apps	Goals	Apps	Goals	Apps	Goals	Apps	Goals	Apps	Goals
Reading	2004–05	Championship	0	0	0	0	0	0	—		0	0
Tamworth (loan)	2004–05	Conference National	6	0	0	0	—		0	0	6	0
Bristol Rovers	2004–05	League Two	1	0	0	0	0	0	0	0	1	0
Barnet	2005–06	League Two	20	1	1	0	2	0	2 (Note: Appearance(s) in the Football League Trophy)	0	25	1
Aldershot Town	2006–07	Conference National	39	3	5	2	—		0	0	44	5
Aldershot Town	2007–08	Conference Premier	37	4	1	0	—		5 (Note: Three appearances in the FA Trophy, two appearances in the Conference League Cup)	0	43	4
Aldershot Town	2008–09	League Two	35	3	3	0	1	0	1	0	40	3
Aldershot Town	2009–10	League Two	36	7	3	1	1	0	1	1	41	9
Aldershot Town	Total		147	17	12	3	2	0	7	1	168	21
Southend United	2010–11	League Two	31	0	0	0	2	0	3	1	36	1
Hayes & Yeading United	2011–12	Conference Premier	31	15	1	1	—		1 (Note: Appearance in the FA Trophy)	0	33	16
Grimsby Town	2011–12	Conference Premier	11	0	0	0	—		0	0	11	0
Grimsby Town	2012–13	Conference Premier	4	0	0	0	—		1	0	5	0
Grimsby Town	Total		15	0	0	0	—		1	0	16	0
Ebbsfleet United (loan)	2012–13	Conference Premier	8	0	1	0	—		0	0	9	0
Alfreton Town (loan)	2012–13	Conference Premier	18	2	0	0	—		0	0	18	2
Hayes & Yeading United	2013–14	Conference South	9	3	0	0	—		0	0	9	3
Basingstoke Town	2013–14	Conference South	1	1	0	0	—		0	0	1	1
Career total			287	39	15	4	6	0	14	2	322	45

== Personal life ==
His brother, Tom is also a footballer with League One side AFC Wimbledon.

== Honours ==
Aldershot

- Conference National: 2008
- Conference League Cup: 2008

Grimsby Town

- Lincolnshire Senior Cup: 2012–13
