= 2011–12 Crawley Town F.C. season =

Crawley Town F.C.
2011–12 season
- Chairman: Victor Marley
- Manager: Steve Evans (until 9 April 2012); Craig Brewster (caretaker)
- League 2: 3rd (promoted)
- FA Cup: 5th round
- League Cup: 1st round
- Football League Trophy: 1st Round (South)
- Top goalscorer: League: Tyrone Barnett (13); All: Matt Tubbs (18)
- Highest home attendance: League: 4,723 vs Crewe Alexandra (6 April 2012); All: 4,723 vs Crewe Alexandra (6 April 2012)
- Lowest home attendance: League: 2,184 vs Morecambe (22 February 2012); All: 2,184 vs Morecambe (22 February 2012)
- Average home league attendance: 3,257
Home colours	Away colours	Third colours

The 2011–12 season was the 62nd season in which Crawley Town have played senior football, and the seventh as a fully professional team. It was the first time in the club's history that they competed in The Football League. Crawley Town competed in the Football League Two, the fourth tier of English football, where they finished 3rd, gaining promotion to League One, the third tier of English football. The club also competed in the FA Cup, where they reached the fifth round, prior to being knocked out by then Premier League club Stoke City. They also competed in the League Cup and the Football League Trophy, where they were knocked out in the first round.

== League table ==
Pos	Team	Pld	W	D	L	GF	GA	GD	Pts	Promotion, qualification or relegation
1	Swindon Town (C, P)	46	29	6	11	75	32	+43	93	Promotion to Football League One
2	Shrewsbury Town (P)	46	26	10	10	66	41	+25	88	Promotion to Football League One
3	Crawley Town (P)	46	23	15	8	76	54	+22	84	Promotion to Football League One
4	Southend United	46	25	8	13	77	48	+29	83	Qualification for League Two play-offs (Note: Four teams play for one spot and promotion to Football League One.)
5	Torquay United	46	23	12	11	63	50	+13	81	Qualification for League Two play-offs

Updated to match(es) played on 5 May 2012. Source: BBC Sport
Rules for classification: 1) Points; 2) Goal difference; 3) Number of goals scored
(C) Champions; (P) Promoted

== Results ==
=== Friendly matches ===
11 July 2011	S.C. Olhanense	2–1	Crawley Town	Tavira
17:00 WEST	Wilson Eduardo 51'; Nuno Piloto 63'	Report	Mexer 34' (o.g.)	Stadium: José Arcanjo

16 July 2011	Crawley Town	6–1	Chelsea XI	Crawley
15:00 BST	Tubbs 8', 12'; Akinde 29'; Thomas 56', 85'; Barnett 78'	Report	Phillip 60'	Stadium: Broadfield Stadium

19 July 2011	Bognor Regis	1–3	Crawley Town	Bognor Regis
19:45 BST	Dodds	Report	Akinde; Thomas; Akpan	Stadium: Nyewood Lane

19 July 2011	East Grinstead Town	1–8	Crawley Town	East Grinstead
19:30 BST	JP Collier 65'	Report	Tubbs 6', 49', 55'; Barnett 40', 56', 76'; Neilson 75'	Stadium: The GAC Stadium

22 July 2011	Crawley Town	0–0	Crystal Palace	Crawley
19:45 BST		Report		Stadium: Broadfield Stadium

23 July 2011	Dartford	1–1	Crawley Town	Dartford
15:00 BST	Burns	Report	Gibson	Stadium: Princes Park

26 July 2011	Crawley Town	2–4	Peterborough United	Crawley
19:45 BST	Barnett 27'; Howell 28'	Report	Rowe 43'; Ajose 54'; Ball 70'; Taylor 75'	Stadium: Broadfield Stadium

2 August 2011	Crawley Town	2–4	Queens Park Rangers	Crawley
19:45 BST	Wassmer 58', 88'	Report	Gorkšs 11'; Helguson 48', 67'; Cook 80'	Stadium: Broadfield Stadium

=== League Two ===
6 August 2011 1	Port Vale	2–2	Crawley Town	Stoke-on-Trent
15:00 BST	Richards 42'; Dodds 90+1'	Report	Barnett 39'; McFadzean 51'; Dempster (yellow card) 74' (yellow-red card) 77'	Stadium: Vale Park; Attendance: 5,889; Referee: David Webb

13 August 2011 2	Crawley Town	2–0	Macclesfield Town	Crawley
15:00 BST	Barnett 57'; Thomas 75'	Report		Stadium: Broadfield Stadium; Attendance: 2,389; Referee: Andy D'Urso

16 August 2011 3	Crawley Town	3–0	Southend United	Crawley
19:45 BST	Howell 56'; Tubbs 68' (pen.), 70'	Report		Stadium: Broadfield Stadium; Attendance: 3,220; Referee: Peter Walton

20 August 2011 4	Torquay United	1–3	Crawley Town	Torquay
15:00 BST	Mansell 50'	Report	Davies 4'; Wassmer 44'; Simpson 46'	Stadium: Plainmoor; Attendance: 2,658

27 August 2011 5	Cheltenham Town	3–1	Crawley Town	Cheltenham
15:00 BST	Mohamed 22'; Pack 31'; Goulding 39'	Report	Tubbs 51' (pen.)	Stadium: Abbey Business Stadium; Attendance: 2,609; Referee: Roger East

3 September 2011 6	Crawley Town	4–1	Bristol Rovers	Crawley
15:00 BST	Barnett 14', 84'; Smith 28'; Tubbs 74'	Report	L. Brown 80'	Stadium: Broadfield Stadium; Attendance: 3,693; Referee: Mark Haywood

10 September 2011 7	Morecambe	6–0	Crawley Town	Morecambe
15:00 BST	Carlton 9', 62', 72'; Fenton 22'; Ellison 69'; Wilson 84' (pen.)	Report		Stadium: Globe Arena; Attendance: 2,054; Referee: Robert Lewis

13 September 2011 8	Crawley Town	0–3	Swindon Town	Crawley
19:45 BST		Report	Connell 28'; Kerrouche 82', 85'	Stadium: Broadfield Stadium; Attendance: 2,790; Referee: James Linington

17 September 2011 9	Crawley Town	3–1	Bradford City	Crawley
15:00 BST	Barnett 54', 88'; Drury 62'	Report	Reid 12'	Stadium: Broadfield Stadium; Attendance: 2,479; Referee: Keith Stroud

24 September 2011 10	Aldershot Town	0–1	Crawley Town	Aldershot
15:00 BST		Report	Barnett 64'	Stadium: The EBB Stadium; Attendance: 3,276; Referee: Dean Mohareb

1 October 2011 11	Crawley Town	2–0	Plymouth Argyle	Crawley
15:00 BST	Tubbs 5', 61'	Report		Stadium: Broadfield Stadium; Attendance: 3,175; Referee: Gary Sutton

8 October 2011 12	Northampton Town	0–1	Crawley Town	Northampton
12:45 BST		Report	Tubbs 23'	Stadium: Sixfields Stadium; Attendance: 4,803; Referee: Graham Scott

16 October 2011 13	Crawley Town	2–1	Shrewsbury Town	Crawley
15:00 BST	Torres 14'; Howell 43'	Report	Wright 72'	Stadium: Broadfield Stadium; Attendance: 3,453; Referee: Carl Boyeson

22 October 2011 14	AFC Wimbledon	2–5	Crawley Town	Kingston upon Thames
15:00 BST	Davis 11' (o.g.); Midson 44'	Report	Bush 3' (o.g.); Davis 9'; Tubbs 54' (pen.); Bulman 59', 84'	Stadium: Kingsmeadow; Attendance: 4,549; Referee: Andrew Madley

25 October 2011 15	Crawley Town	3–1	Dagenham & Redbridge	Crawley
19:45 BST	Tubbs 18' (pen.); Torres 45+4'; Pittman 85'	Report	Lee 9'; Doe (red card) 17'	Stadium: Broadfield Stadium; Attendance: 2,862; Referee: Steve Rushton

29 October 2011 16	Crawley Town	1–1	Accrington Stanley	Crawley
15:00 BST	Akpan 78'	Report	Murphy 41'	Stadium: Broadfield Stadium; Attendance: 2,987; Referee: Phil Gibbs

5 November 2011 17	Hereford United	1–1	Crawley Town	Hereford
15:00 GMT	Barkhuizen 9'	Report	Drury 41'	Stadium: Edgar Street; Attendance: 2,227; Referee: Darren Drysdale

19 November 2011 18	Crawley Town	4–1	Oxford United	Crawley
15:00 GMT	Barnett 4', 14'; Drury 45'; Howell 52'	Report	Constable 30'	Stadium: Broadfield Stadium; Attendance: 4,042; Referee: Dean Whitestone

26 November 2011 19	Rotherham United	1–2	Crawley Town	Sheffield
15:00 GMT	Williams 20'	Report	Barnett 48'; Simpson 68'	Stadium: Don Valley Stadium; Attendance: 3,962; Referee: Andy Haines

10 December 2011 20	Crawley Town	3–0	Burton Albion	Crawley
15:00 GMT	Davis 22'; Webster 56' (o.g.); Tubbs 83'	Report		Stadium: Broadfield Stadium; Attendance: 3,001; Referee: Craig Pawson

17 December 2011 21	Crewe Alexandra	1–1	Crawley Town	Crewe
15:00 GMT	Fletcher 9'; Miller (red card) 15'	Report	Tubbs 31'	Stadium: Alexandra Stadium; Attendance: 3,635; Referee: Stuart Attwell

26 December 2011 22	Crawley Town	1–2	Gillingham	Crawley
15:00 GMT	Davis (red card) 19'; Tubbs 34' (pen.)	Report	Kuffour 50', 52'; Rooney (yellow card) 80' (yellow-red card) 90+2'	Stadium: Broadfield Stadium; Attendance: 4,255; Referee: Darren Sheldrake

30 December 2011 23	Crawley Town	1–0	Barnet	Crawley
19:45 GMT	Barnett 3'	Report		Stadium: Broadfield Stadium; Attendance: 3,008; Referee: Carl Berry

2 January 2012 24	Oxford United	1–1	Crawley Town	Oxford
15:00 GMT	Pittman 55'	Report	Barnett 90'	Stadium: The Kassam Stadium; Attendance: 9,004; Referee: Brendan Malone

14 January 2012 25	Bristol Rovers	0–0	Crawley Town	Bristol
15:00 GMT		Report		Stadium: Memorial Stadium; Attendance: 5,082; Referee: James Linington

21 January 2012 26	Plymouth Argyle	1–1	Crawley Town	Plymouth
15:00 GMT	Blanchard 90'	Report	Mills 45+1'	Stadium: Home Park; Attendance: 6,417; Referee: Phil Gibbs

7 February 2012 27	Crawley Town	4–2	Cheltenham Town	Crawley
19:45 GMT	Watt 12', 64'; Barnett 14', 39'	Report	Garbutt 5'; Duffy 75'	Stadium: Broadfield Stadium; Attendance: 3,871; Referee: Graham Scott

14 February 2012 28	Swindon Town	3–0	Crawley Town	Swindon
19:45 GMT	Rooney 39'; Bodin 53'; Benson 68'	Report		Stadium: County Ground; Attendance: 8,311; Referee: Mark Haywood

22 February 2012 29	Crawley Town	1–1	Morecambe	Crawley
19:45 GMT	Neilson 49'	Report	Fleming 21'	Stadium: Broadfield Stadium; Attendance: 2,184; Referee: James Adcock

27 February 2012 30	Shrewsbury Town	2–1	Crawley Town	Shrewsbury
19:45 GMT	Wright 44'; Morgan 74'	Report	Akinde 33'	Stadium: New Meadow; Attendance: 5,229; Referee: Jonathan Moss

3 March 2012 31	Crawley Town	0–1	Torquay United	Crawley
15:00 GMT		Report	O'Kane 79'	Stadium: Broadfield Stadium; Attendance: 3,361; Referee: Simon Hooper

5 March 2012 32	Southend United	0–0	Crawley Town	Southend-on-Sea
19:45 GMT	Barker (yellow card) 12' (yellow-red card) 60'	Report		Stadium: Roots Hall Stadium; Attendance: 5,439; Referee: Neil Swarbrick

10 March 2012 33	Macclesfield Town	2–2	Crawley Town	Macclesfield
15:00 GMT	Mukendi 85'; Donnelly 90+2'	Report	Davis 37'; McFadzean 47'	Stadium: Moss Rose; Attendance: 1,802; Referee: Eddie Ilderton

13 March 2012 34	Crawley Town	2–2	Aldershot Town	Crawley
19:45 GMT	Alexander 33' (pen.); Clarke 88'	Report	Morris 4'; Vincenti 63'	Stadium: Broadfield Stadium; Attendance: 3,017; Referee: David Phillips

17 March 2012 35	Crawley Town	3–2	Port Vale	Crawley
15:00 GMT	Torres 42'; Alexander 70', 83'	Report	Richards 32'; McDonald (yellow card) 46' (yellow-red card) 47'; Dodds 58'	Stadium: Broadfield Stadium; Attendance: 2,375; Referee: Mark Brown

20 March 2012 36	Gillingham	0–1	Crawley Town	Gillingham
19:45 GMT		Report	Bulman 50'	Stadium: Priestfield Stadium; Attendance: 5,204; Referee: Mark Heywood

24 March 2012 37	Crawley Town	3–0	Rotherham United	Crawley
15:00 GMT	Clarke 43'; Alexander 53' (pen.); Mills 67'	Report		Stadium: Broadfield Stadium; Attendance: 2,766; Referee: Gavin Ward

27 March 2012 38	Bradford City	1–2	Crawley Town	Bradford
19:45 BST	Dagnall 72'	Report	Clarke 54'; Alexander 76'	Stadium: Valley Parade; Attendance: 9,773; Referee: Iain Williamson

31 March 2012 39	Burton Albion	0–0	Crawley Town	Burton upon Trent
15:00 BST		Report		Stadium: Pirelli Stadium; Attendance: 2,572; Referee: Roger East

6 April 2012 40	Crawley Town	1–1	Crewe Alexandra	Crawley
15:00 BST	Alexander 88' (pen.)	Report	Moore 29'	Stadium: Broadfield Stadium; Attendance: 4,723; Referee: Brendan Malone

9 April 2012 41	Barnet	1–2	Crawley Town	London
15:00 BST	Holmes 15'	Report	Dempster 52'; Davies 61'; Torres (red card) 90+2'	Stadium: Underhill Stadium; Attendance: 2,099; Referee: Andy Haines

14 April 2012 42	Crawley Town	1–1	AFC Wimbledon	Crawley
15:00 BST	Akpan (red card) 6'; Alexander 81'	Report	Moore 77'	Stadium: Broadfield Stadium; Attendance: 3,768; Referee: Darren Drysdale

17 April 2012 43	Crawley Town	3–1	Northampton Town	Crawley
19:45 BST	Neilson 14'; Clarke 22'; Kitson 39' (o.g.)	Report	Williams 65'	Stadium: Broadfield Stadium; Attendance: 2,861; Referee: Christopher Sarginson

21 April 2012 44	Dagenham & Redbridge	1–1	Crawley Town	Dagenham
15:00 BST	Bingham 45+1'	Report	Wassmer 18'	Stadium: Victoria Road; Attendance: 2,456; Referee: Danny McDermid

28 April 2012 45	Crawley Town	0–3	Hereford United	Crawley
15:00 BST		Report	Colbeck 55'; Arquin 77', 83'	Stadium: Broadfield Stadium; Attendance: 4,615; Referee: Mick Russell

5 May 2012 46	Accrington Stanley	0–1	Crawley Town	Accrington
15:00 BST		Report	Neilson 67'	Stadium: Crown Ground; Attendance: 2,299; Referee: Darren Deadman

=== FA Cup ===
12 November 2011 R1	Bury	0–2	Crawley Town	Bury
15:00	Hughes (red card) 83'	Report	Barnett 49'; Doughty 82'	Stadium: Gigg Lane; Attendance: 2,436; Referee: Mark Brown

3 December 2011 R2	Crawley Town	5–0	Redbridge F.C.	Crawley
15:00	Tubbs 31' (pen.), 36', 79' (pen.); Drury 83'; McFadzean 90+5'	Report	Durrant (red card) 78'	Stadium: Broadfield Stadium; Attendance: 2,494; Referee: Steve Rushton

7 January 2012 R3	Crawley Town	1–0	Bristol City	Crawley
15:00	Tubbs 73'	Report	Pearson (yellow card) 23' (yellow-red card) 82'	Stadium: Broadfield Stadium; Attendance: 3,779; Referee: Andy D'Urso

28 January 2012 R4	Hull City	0–1	Crawley Town	Kingston upon Hull
15:00		Report	Tubbs 56'	Stadium: KC Stadium; Attendance: 14,473; Referee: Stuart Attwell

19 February 2012 R5	Crawley Town	0–2	Stoke City	Crawley
12:00		Report	Delap (red card) 17'; Walters 43' (pen.); Crouch 53'	Stadium: Broadfield Stadium; Attendance: 4,214; Referee: Michael Jones

=== Football League Cup ===
29 July 2011 PR1	Crawley Town	3–2	AFC Wimbledon	Crawley
19:45	Akpan 38' (yellow card) 82' (yellow-red card) 90+5'; Torres 53'; Tubbs 64'	Report	Moore 26'; Midson 46'	Stadium: Broadfield Stadium; Attendance: 3,204; Referee: Darren Deadman

23 August 2011 R1	Crystal Palace	2–0	Crawley Town	London
19:30	Zaha 54', 58'	Report		Stadium: Selhurst Park; Attendance: 8,901; Referee: Michael Naylor

=== Football League Trophy ===
30 August 2011 R1	Southend United	1–0	Crawley Town	Southend-on-Sea
19:45	Dickinson 25' (pen.) (red card) 66'	Report		Stadium: Roots Hall; Attendance: 2,053; Referee: Pat Miller

== Squad statistics ==
=== Appearances and goals ===
No.	Pos	Nat	Player	Total		League Two		FA Cup		League Cup		FL Trophy	
No.	Pos	Nat	Player	Apps	Goals	Apps	Goals	Apps	Goals	Apps	Goals	Apps	Goals
1	GK	(Netherlands) NED	Michel Kuipers	17	0	15+0	0	0+0	0	1+0	0	1+0	0
2	MF	(Ireland) EIR	Scott Davies	21	2	17+3	2	0+0	0	1+0	0	0+0	0
3	DF	(England) ENG	Dean Howell	44	3	36+1	3	5+0	0	2+0	0	0+0	0
4	DF	(England) ENG	Pablo Mills	25	2	19+2	2	4+0	0	0+0	0	0+0	0
5	DF	(England) ENG	Kyle McFadzean	45	3	36+1	2	5+0	1	2+0	0	1+0	0
6	MF	(Nigeria) NGR	Hope Akpan	33	2	17+9	1	0+4	0	2+0	1	1+0	0
7	FW	(Ireland) EIR	Billy Clarke	21	3	16+1	3	0+4	0	0+0	0	0+0	0
8	MF	(Argentina) ARG	Sergio Torres	46	4	37+1	3	5+0	0	2+0	1	1+0	0
9	FW	(England) ENG	Gary Alexander	14	7	14+0	7	0+0	0	0+0	0	0+0	0
11	MF	(England) ENG	Josh Simpson	47	2	31+9	2	4+1	0	2+0	0	0+0	0
12	MF	(England) ENG	Ben Smith	7	1	3+2	1	0+0	0	0+1	0	1+0	0
13	MF	(England) ENG	David Hunt	35	0	26+1	0	5+0	0	2+0	0	0+1	0
15	MF	(England) ENG	Dannie Bulman	48	3	41+0	3	5+0	0	1+0	0	1+0	0
16	DF	(Wales) WAL	Glenn Wilson	7	0	2+2	0	0+0	0	0+2	0	1+0	0
17	FW	(England) ENG	John Akinde	29	1	7+18	1	0+2	0	0+1	0	1+0	0
18	DF	(Scotland) SCO	John Dempster	10	1	6+1	1	0+1	0	1+0	0	1+0	0
20	DF	(England) ENG	Charlie Wassmer	15	2	12+1	2	0+0	0	1+0	0	1+0	0
22	MF	(Wales) WAL	Scott Neilson	35	3	11+19	3	0+3	0	0+1	0	0+1	0
23	FW	(England) ENG	Tyrone Barnett	33	14	25+1	13	5+0	1	2+0	0	0+0	0
25	GK	(Scotland) SCO	Scott Shearer	30	0	25+0	0	4+0	0	1+0	0	0+0	0
28	DF	(Jamaica) JAM	Claude Davis	33	3	27+2	3	4+0	0	0+0	0	0+0	0
Players featured for Crawley but left before the end of the season:
10	FW	(England) ENG	Wesley Thomas	7	1	2+3	1	0+0	0	0+1	0	0+1	0
9	FW	(England) ENG	Matt Tubbs	31	18	23+1	12	4+0	5	2+0	1	1+0	0
Players on loan for Crawley Town who returned to their parent club:
26	DF	(England) ENG	Tom Eastman	6	0	6+0	0	0+0	0	0+0	0	0+0	0
19	DF	(England) ENG	Scott Griffiths	6	0	6+0	0	0+0	0	0+0	0	0+0	0
21	MF	(Wales) WAL	Michael Doughty	18	2	2+14	1	0+2	1	0+0	0	0+0	0
29	FW	(England) ENG	Jon-Paul Pittman	4	1	0+4	1	0+0	0	0+0	0	0+0	0
10	MF	(England) ENG	Sanchez Watt	16	2	6+8	2	2+0	0	0+0	0	0+0	0
30	DF	(Scotland) SCO	Warren Cummings	9	0	6+3	0	0+0	0	0+0	0	0+0	0
31	MF	(Wales) WAL	Lloyd James	6	0	6+0	0	0+0	0	0+0	0	0+0	0
39	FW	(England) ENG	Leon Clarke	4	1	4+0	1	0+0	0	0+0	0	0+0	0
26	GK	(Ireland) EIR	Rene Gilmartin	7	0	6+0	0	1+0	0	0+0	0	0+0	0
27	MF	(England) ENG	Andy Drury	15	4	13+0	3	2+0	1	0+0	0	0+0	0
19	FW	(England) ENG	Karl Hawley	4	0	1+3	0	0+0	0	0+0	0	0+0	0
21	MF	(England) ENG	Shaun Batt	5	0	2+3	0	0+0	0	0+0	0	0+0	0

=== Top scorers ===
Place	Position	Nation	Number	Name	League Two	FA Cup	League Cup	FL Trophy	Total
1	FW	(England)	9	Matt Tubbs	12	5	1	0	18
2	FW	(England)	23	Tyrone Barnett	13	1	0	0	14
3	FW	(England)	9	Gary Alexander	7	0	0	0	7
4	MF	(Argentina)	8	Sergio Torres	3	0	1	0	4
=	MF	(England)	27	Andy Drury	3	1	0	0	4
6	DF	(England)	3	Dean Howell	3	0	0	0	3
=	MF	(England)	15	Dannie Bulman	3	0	0	0	3
=	DF	(Jamaica)	28	Claude Davis	3	0	0	0	3
=	FW	(Republic of Ireland)	7	Billy Clarke	3	0	0	0	3
=	MF	(Wales)	22	Scott Neilson	3	0	0	0	3
=	DF	(England)	5	Kyle McFadzean	2	1	0	0	3
12	MF	(England)	11	Josh Simpson	2	0	0	0	2
=	MF	(Republic of Ireland)	2	Scott Davies	2	0	0	0	2
=	MF	(England)	10	Sanchez Watt	2	0	0	0	2
=	DF	(England)	4	Pablo Mills	2	0	0	0	2
=	DF	(England)	20	Charlie Wassmer	2	0	0	0	2
=	MF	(Nigeria)	6	Hope Akpan	1	0	1	0	2
=	MF	(Wales)	21	Michael Doughty	1	1	0	0	2
19	MF	(England)	12	Ben Smith	1	0	0	0	1
=	FW	(England)	10	Wesley Thomas	1	0	0	0	1
=	FW	(England)	17	John Akinde	1	0	0	0	1
=	FW	(England)	29	Jon-Paul Pittman	1	0	0	0	1
=	FW	(England)	39	Leon Clarke	1	0	0	0	1
=	DF	(Scotland)	18	John Dempster	1	0	0	0	1
				TOTALS	73	9	3	0	85

=== Disciplinary record ===
Number	Nation	Position	Name	League Two		FA Cup		League Cup		FL Trophy		Total	
Number	Nation	Position	Name	Yellow card	Red card	Yellow card	Red card	Yellow card	Red card	Yellow card	Red card	Yellow card	Red card
1	(Netherlands)	GK	Michel Kuipers	3	0	0	0	0	0	0	0	3	0
2	(Republic of Ireland)	MF	Scott Davies	6	0	0	0	0	0	0	0	6	0
3	(England)	DF	Dean Howell	0	0	0	0	1	0	0	0	1	0
4	(England)	DF	Pablo Mills	1	1	0	0	0	0	0	0	1	1
5	(England)	DF	Kyle McFadzean	7	0	1	0	0	0	0	0	8	0
6	(Nigeria)	MF	Hope Akpan	4	1	0	0	2	1	0	0	6	2
8	(Argentina)	MF	Sergio Torres	4	1	1	0	1	0	0	0	6	1
9	(England)	FW	Gary Alexander	3	0	0	0	0	0	0	0	3	0
9	(England)	FW	Matt Tubbs	1	0	1	0	0	0	0	0	2	0
10	(England)	FW	Wesley Thomas	2	0	0	0	0	0	0	0	2	0
10	(England)	MF	Sanchez Watt	1	0	0	0	0	0	0	0	1	0
12	(England)	MF	Ben Smith	1	0	0	0	0	0	1	0	2	0
13	(England)	MF	David Hunt	4	0	0	0	0	0	0	0	4	0
15	(England)	MF	Dannie Bulman	1	0	0	0	0	0	0	0	1	0
16	(Wales)	MF	Glenn Wilson	1	0	0	0	0	0	0	0	1	0
17	(England)	FW	John Akinde	1	0	0	0	0	0	1	0	2	0
18	(Scotland)	DF	John Dempster	4	1	0	0	1	0	0	0	5	1
19	(England)	DF	Scott Griffiths	1	0	0	0	0	0	0	0	1	0
20	(England)	DF	Charlie Wassmer	1	0	0	0	0	0	0	0	1	0
21	(Wales)	MF	Michael Doughty	2	0	0	0	0	0	0	0	2	0
21	(England)	MF	Shaun Batt	1	0	0	0	0	0	0	0	1	0
22	(Wales)	MF	Scott Neilson	1	0	0	0	1	0	0	0	2	0
23	(England)	FW	Tyrone Barnett	1	0	0	0	0	0	0	0	1	0
26	(England)	DF	Tom Eastman	1	0	0	0	0	0	0	0	1	0
27	(England)	DF	Andy Drury	1	0	0	0	0	0	0	0	1	0
28	(Jamaica)	DF	Claude Davis	7	2	1	0	0	0	0	0	8	2
29	(England)	FW	Jon-Paul Pittman	1	0	0	0	0	0	0	0	1	0
30	(Scotland)	DF	Warren Cummings	1	0	0	0	0	0	0	0	1	0
39	(England)	FW	Leon Clarke	1	0	0	0	0	0	0	0	1	0
			TOTALS	63	6	4	0	6	1	2	0	75	7

== Transfers ==
=== Transfers in ===
Date	Position	Name	From	Fee	Ref.
27 May 2011	DF	Jamie Day	Rushden & Diamonds	Free	
27 May 2011	FW	John Akinde	Bristol City	Free	
31 May 2011	MF	Scott Davies	Reading	Free	
31 May 2011	FW	Wesley Thomas	Cheltenham Town	Free	
14 June 2011	MF	Hope Akpan	Everton	Free	
29 June 2011	FW	Tyrone Barnett	Macclesfield Town	Undisclosed	
16 September 2011	DF	Claude Davis	Free agent	Free	
31 January 2012	FW	Billy Clarke	Blackpool	Undisclosed	

=== Loans in ===
Date from	Position	Name	From	Date until	Ref.
19 August 2011	MF	Michael Doughty	Queens Park Rangers	19 February 2011	
8 September 2011	DF	Scott Griffiths	Peterborough United	8 October 2011	
12 September 2011	FW	Jon-Paul Pittman	Oxford United	12 December 2011	
13 September 2011	DF	Tom Eastman	Colchester United	13 October 2011	
15 September 2011	MF	Andy Drury	Ipswich Town	17 December 2011	
26 January 2012	MF	Sanchez Watt	Arsenal	30 June 2012	
31 January 2012	FW	Karl Hawley	Notts County	30 June 2012	
17 February 2012	GK	Rene Gilmartin	Watford	17 March 2012	
21 February 2012	MF	Shaun Batt	Millwall	21 March 2012	
2 March 2012	DF	Warren Cummings	Bournemouth	2 April 2012	
2 March 2012	DF	Lloyd James	Colchester United	2 April 2012	
8 March 2012	FW	Gary Alexander	Brentford	30 June 2012	
17 March 2012	FW	Leon Clarke	Charlton Athletic	30 June 2012	

=== Transfers out ===
Date	Position	Name	To	Fee	Ref.
13 May 2011	MF	Simon Rusk	Retired		
13 May 2011	GK	Nick Jordan		Free	
13 May 2011	DF	Danny Hall	Stockport County	Free	
13 May 2011	DF	Sam Rents	Gateshead	Free	
13 May 2011	FW	Jamie Cook	Bath City	Free	
13 May 2011	FW	Craig McAllister	Newport County	Free	
13 May 2011	MF	Steven Masterton	(Scotland) Montrose	Free	
13 May 2011	FW	Tommy Brewer		Free	
13 June 2011	FW	Ben Wright	Braintree Town	Free	
18 July 2011	MF	James Dance	Luton Town	Undisclosed	
1 January 2012	FW	Wesley Thomas	Bournemouth	£200,000	
31 January 2012	FW	Matt Tubbs	Bournemouth	£800,000	
31 January 2012	MF	Willie Gibson	(Scotland) Falkirk	Free	

=== Loans out ===
Date from	Position	Name	To	Date until	Ref.
24 August 2011	MF	Willie Gibson	(Scotland) St Johnstone	24 January 2011	
9 September 2011	FW	Wesley Thomas	Bournemouth	11 December 2011	
23 September 2011	DF	John Dempster	Kettering Town	23 October 2011	
23 September 2011	MF	Ben Smith	Kettering Town	23 October 2011	
12 October 2011	DF	Charlie Wassmer	Fleetwood Town	14 January 2012	
12 October 2011	DF	Glenn Wilson	Fleetwood Town	14 January 2012	
27 October 2011	MF	Scott Davies	Aldershot Town	1 January 2012	
27 October 2011	DF	Jamie Day	Aldershot Town	1 January 2012	
22 November 2011	DF	John Dempster	Mansfield Town	23 February 2012	
25 November 2011	MF	Ben Smith	Woking	25 December 2011	
31 January 2012	MF	Ben Smith	Aldershot Town	3 May 2012	
21 February 2012	FW	Tyrone Barnett	Peterborough United	30 June 2012	
17 March 2012	DF	Charlie Wassmer	Dagenham & Redbridge	30 June 2012	
17 March 2012	FW	John Akinde	Dagenham & Redbridge	30 June 2012	

== Awards ==
End of Season Awards	Winner
Player of the Year	Dannie Bulman
Young Player of the Year	Hope Akpan
Goal of the Season	Scott Davies vs Torquay United
Best Individual Performance	Michel Kuipers vs Crewe Alexandra
