= Glenn Wilson (footballer) =

English footballer

Personal information
- Full name: Glenn Michael Wilson
- Date of birth: 16 March 1986 (age 40)
- Place of birth: Lewisham, England
- Position: Centre-back

Team information
- Current team: East Grinstead Town

Youth career
- 1995–2004: Crystal Palace

Senior career*
Years	Team	Apps	(Gls)
2004–2006	Crystal Palace	0	(0)
2004	→ AFC Wimbledon (loan)	3	(0)
2006–2007	Rushden & Diamonds	31	(0)
2007	→ Kidderminster Harriers (loan)	6	(0)
2007–2012	Crawley Town	150	(8)
2011	→ Fleetwood Town (loan)	5	(0)
2012	→ Woking (loan)	3	(0)
2012–2013	Gateshead	8	(0)
2013	→ Salisbury City (loan)	17	(0)
2013–2014	Salisbury City	46	(0)
2014–2015	Aldershot Town	42	(2)
2015–2016	Margate	41	(1)
2016–2017	Greenwich Borough	50	(3)
2017	Grays Athletic	4	(1)
2017–2019	Wealdstone	21	(1)
2019	Hornchurch	17	(0)
2019–2020	Enfield Town	18	(0)
2020–	East Grinstead Town	78	(4)
- * Club domestic league appearances and goals as of 10:42, 15 October 2023 (UTC)

Glenn Michael Wilson (born 16 March 1986) is an English professional footballer who plays as a defender for East Grinstead Town.

== Career ==
Born in Lewisham, Greater London, Wilson came through the youth setup of Crystal Palace where he had been since the age of nine. However, despite being reserve team captain he found first team opportunities limited at Selhurst Park and was sent on a month-long loan to Isthmian League First Division side AFC Wimbledon. Wilson signed for Conference National club Rushden & Diamonds in July 2006, where he found himself a first team regular under manager Paul Hart. However, Hart was sacked later on in the season, and Wilson fell out of favour at the club when Graham Westley was appointed. In March 2007, he was sent out on loan to fellow Conference side Kidderminster Harriers for the rest of the season. In the summer of 2007 Wilson joined Crawley Town on a free transfer. In May 2012, Wilson was released by the club after being deemed surplus to requirements.

On 28 June 2012, Wilson signed for Gateshead on a one-year deal. He made his debut as a substitute on 14 August 2012 in a 4–1 win over Mansfield Town. He made his first start for Gateshead on 22 September 2012 in a 2–1 defeat at Woking.

On 30 January 2013, Wilson joined Salisbury City on loan for the rest of the season. He made his debut for Salisbury on 9 February in a 2–1 defeat against Dorchester Town.

On 25 April 2013, Wilson was one of seven players released by Gateshead.

He returned to Salisbury City in the pre-season period, and made an appearance for them against Bournemouth. Two days later, he signed for Salisbury ahead of the upcoming season. As a result of Salisbury captain Brian Dutton developing injury problems, Wilson took on the role of captain and started the season well, playing as a central defender instead of his usual full-back position.

Wilson signed for Conference Premier side Aldershot Town on 26 June 2014.

In January 2019, Wilson signed with Hornchurch on dual registration.

== Career statistics ==
As of match played 9 December 2017

Appearances and goals by club, season and competition
Club	Season	League			FA Cup		League Cup		Other		Total	
Club	Season	Division	Apps	Goals	Apps	Goals	Apps	Goals	Apps	Goals	Apps	Goals
AFC Wimbledon (loan)	2004–05	IL – Division One	4	0	0	0	—		0	0	4	0
Rushden & Diamonds	2006–07	Conference National	31	0	2	0	—		1 (Note: Appearances in the FA Trophy)	0	34	0
Kidderminster Harriers (loan)	2006–07	Conference National	6	0	—		—		0	0	6	0
Crawley Town	2007–08	Conference Premier	35	0	0	0	—		1 (Note: Appearance in the Conference League Cup)	0	36	0
Crawley Town	2008–09	Conference Premier	40	4	0	0	—		0	0	40	4
Crawley Town	2009–10	Conference Premier	32	3	0	0	—		0	0	32	3
Crawley Town	2010–11	Conference Premier	39	0	5	0	—		2	0	46	0
Crawley Town	2011–12	League Two	4	0	0	0	2	0	1 (Note: Appearance in the Football League Trophy)	0	7	0
Crawley Town	Total		150	7	5	0	2	0	4	0	161	7
Fleetwood Town (loan)	2011–12	Conference Premier	5	0	0	0	—		1	0	6	0
Woking (loan)	2011–12	Conference South	3	0	0	0	—		0	0	3	0
Gateshead	2012–13	Conference Premier	9	0	0	0	—		2	0	11	0
Salisbury City (loan)	2012–13	Conference South	17	0	0	0	—		0	0	17	0
Salisbury City	2013–14	Conference Premier	46	0	3	0	—		1	0	50	0
Aldershot Town	2014–15	Conference Premier	42	2	5	0	—		1	0	48	2
Margate	2015–16	National League South	41	1	3	0	—		1	0	45	1
Greenwich Borough	2016–17	IL – Div 1 South	50	3	?	?	—		?	?	50	3
Grays Athletic	2017–18	IL – Div 1 North	4	1	?	?	—		?	?	4	1
Wealdstone	2017–18	National League South	4	0	0	0	—		0	0	4	0
Career total			412	14	18	0	2	0	11	0	443	14
