= Dean Howell =

English footballer (born 1980)

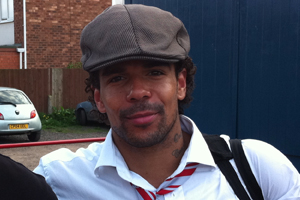

Personal information
- Full name: Dean George Howell
- Date of birth: 29 November 1980 (age 45)
- Place of birth: Burton upon Trent, England
- Height: 6 ft 1 in (1.85 m)
- Positions: Defender; midfielder

Youth career
- –1999: Notts County

Senior career*
Years	Team	Apps	(Gls)
1999–2000	Notts County	1	(0)
1999–2000	→ Spalding United (loan)	0	(0)
2000–2001	Crewe Alexandra	1	(0)
2001	→ Rochdale (loan)	3	(0)
2001–2003	Southport	61	(4)
2003–2004	Morecambe	30	(3)
2004–2005	Halifax Town	33	(6)
2005–2006	Colchester United	4	(0)
2006	Halifax Town	1	(0)
2006–2007	Weymouth	17	(0)
2007	Grays Athletic	8	(0)
2007–2008	Rushden & Diamonds	43	(1)
2008–2010	Aldershot Town	17	(1)
2008	→ Bury (loan)	3	(0)
2010–2012	Crawley Town	72	(4)
2012–2014	Fleetwood Town	38	(1)
2013–2014	→ Bury (loan)	8	(0)
Total		340	(20)
- * Club domestic league appearances and goals

Dean George Howell (born 29 November 1980) is an English former professional footballer, who played at left-back or left-midfield.

== Schoolboy and trainee ==
Howell started as a schoolboy at Stoke City before moving to Notts County as a trainee. He then signed a professional contract in July 1999. Howell was then loaned out to Spalding United for the 1999–2000 season.

== Career ==
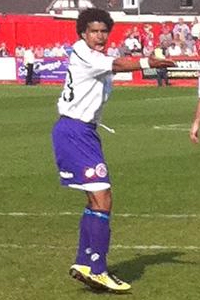
Howell playing for Crawley Town.

In July 2000, Howell then joined Crewe Alexandra, after impressed manager Dario Gradi during his two-week trial. Crewe Alexandra then loaned out Howell, first of all, for two months to Rochdale and then to Southport for a month. His move to Southport was made permanent with a two-year contract, after making an impressive start at Haig Avenue.

Howell then moved up the Lancashire coast to Christie Park, when he signed for Morecambe after Southport were relegated. Howell was then released at the end of the season and signed for Halifax Town.

In August 2005, Howell joined Colchester United on a six-month contract. Unfortunately, a double hernia restricted his appearances before he returned to Halifax Town, where injury again restricted him to just one appearance in four months. Howell's next move was in June 2006, when Howell joined Weymouth following his release by Halifax Town. He made just 17 appearances before joining Grays Athletic.

In the summer of 2007, Howell joined up with his former manager Garry Hill at Rushden & Diamonds. During the 2007–08 season, he made 49 appearances in all competitions, including the Conference League Cup final defeat by Aldershot Town. In May 2008, Howell left Nene Park and became Aldershot Town's first signing of the summer. In November 2008, after limited appearances for Aldershot Town, Howell was loaned out to Bury on a one-month loan.

He joined Crawley Town in July 2010 after he was released by Aldershot. He was named in the Conference Team of the Year for the 2010–11 season after Crawley won the title and so promotion to League Two. In May 2012, Howell was released by the club after being deemed surplus to requirements. He then joined newly promoted Football League Two side Fleetwood Town on a two-year deal.

On 5 November 2013, Dean re-joined League Two side Bury. He signed a loan move to keep him at the club until 5 January 2014.

== Personal life ==
Howell is vegan and has launched his own vegan organic food company.

== Career statistics ==
Appearances and goals by club, season and competition
Club	Season	League			FA Cup		League Cup		Other		Total	
Club	Season	Division	Apps	Goals	Apps	Goals	Apps	Goals	Apps	Goals	Apps	Goals
Notts County	1999–2000	Second Division	1	0	0	0	0	0	0	0	1	0
Crewe Alexandra	2000–01	First Division	1	0	0	0	0	0	0	0	1	0
Rochdale (loan)	2000–01	First Division	3	0	0	0	0	0	0	0	3	0
Southport	2001–02	Conference Premier	21	1	0	0	—		0	0	21	1
Southport	2002–03	Conference Premier	41	3	2	0	—		0	0	43	3
Southport	Total		62	4	2	0	0	0	0	0	64	4
Morecambe	2003–04	Conference Premier	31	3	1	0	—		0	0	32	3
Halifax Town	2004–05	Conference Premier	33	6	2	0	—		1 (Note: Appearance(s) in FA Trophy)	0	36	6
Colchester United	2005–06	League One	4	0	0	0	1	0	0	0	5	0
Halifax Town	2005–06	Conference Premier	1	0	0	0	—		0	0	1	0
Weymouth	2006–07	Conference Premier	17	0	1	0	—		0	0	18	0
Grays Athletic	2006–07	Conference Premier	8	0	0	0	—		0	0	8	0
Rushden & Diamonds	2007–08	Conference Premier	43	1	2	0	—		8 (Note: 3 appearances in FA Trophy and 5 appearances in Conference League Cup)	0	53	1
Aldershot Town	2008–09	League Two	14	0	0	0	1	0	0	0	15	0
Aldershot Town	2009–10	League Two	3	1	0	0	0	0	0	0	3	1
Aldershot Town	Total		17	1	0	0	1	0	0	0	18	1
Bury (loan)	2008–09	League Two	3	0	0	0	0	0	0	0	3	0
Crawley Town	2010–11	Conference Premier	35	1	7	0	—		2	1	44	2
Crawley Town	2011–12	League Two	37	3	5	0	2	0	0	0	44	3
Crawley Town	Total		72	4	12	0	2	0	2	1	88	5
Fleetwood Town	2012–13	League Two	30	1	2	0	1	0	0	0	33	1
Fleetwood Town	2013–14	League Two	8	0	0	0	0	0	1 (Note: Appearance(s) in Football League Trophy)	0	9	0
Fleetwood Town	Total		38	1	2	0	1	0	1	0	42	1
Bury (loan)	2013–14	League Two	8	0	2	0	0	0	0	0	10	0
Career total			342	20	24	0	5	0	12	1	383	21

== Honours ==
Crawley Town

- Conference National: 2010–11
