= Charlie Wassmer =

English footballer (born 1991)

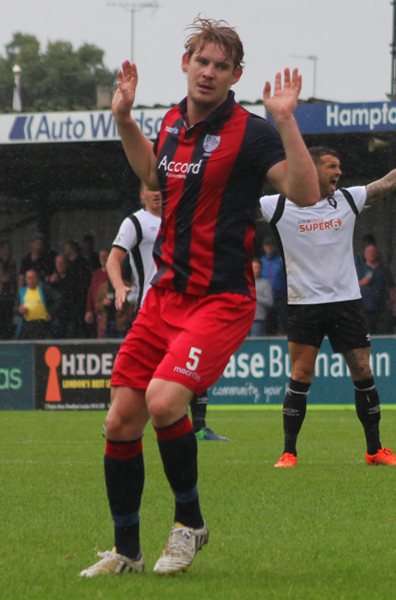
- Wassmer

Personal information
- Full name: Charlie Wassmer
- Date of birth: 21 March 1991 (age 35)
- Place of birth: Hammersmith, England
- Position: Defender

Team information
- Current team: Gosport Borough

Youth career
- –2009: Hayes & Yeading United

Senior career*
Years	Team	Apps	(Gls)
2009–2011	Hayes & Yeading United	21	(0)
2009	→ Harrow Borough (loan)	0	(0)
2011	→ Crawley Town (loan)	12	(2)
2011–2012	Crawley Town	13	(2)
2011	→ Fleetwood Town (loan)	3	(0)
2012	→ Dagenham & Redbridge (loan)	1	(0)
2013	Cambridge United	17	(0)
2013–2014	Hayes & Yeading United	23	(0)
2014–2016	Margate	70	(2)
2016–2017	Maidenhead United	6	(0)
2017	→ Gosport Borough (loan)	4	(0)
2017	→ Kingstonian (loan)	4	(0)
2017–2018	Hampton & Richmond Borough	33	(8)
2018–2019	Woking	1	(0)
2018	→ Metropolitan Police (loan)	2	(0)
2018	→ Leatherhead (loan)	8	(1)
2018–2019	→ Maidstone United (loan)	6	(0)
2019	Billericay Town	17	(2)
2019	→ Hampton & Richmond Borough (loan)	6	(1)
2019–2022	Hampton & Richmond Borough	28	(4)
2022–2023	Hayes & Yeading United	44	(5)
2023	→ Gosport Borough (loan)	3	(0)
2023–	Gosport Borough	24	(3)
- * Club domestic league appearances and goals as of 20:28, 10 November 2024 (UTC)

Charlie Wassmer (born 21 March 1991) is an English semi-professional footballer who plays as a defender for Gosport Borough. Wassmer started his career at Hayes & Yeading United FC before catching the eye of Crawley Town – where he won promotion into EFL League One. In 2017–18, at Hampton & Richmond Borough, Wassmer was named in the National League South team of the year after netting 8 goals from centre back. Wassmer has also spent loan spells at Harrow Borough and Fleetwood Town.

== Career ==
Wassmer progressed through the youth teams at Hayes & Yeading United, making his debut on 13 April 2010 in a Conference National match at Salisbury City. Although just 19 years of age, Wassmer was a regular fixture in the Hayes & Yeading United defence throughout the following campaign. Wassmer's impressive performances caught the eye of Crawley Town, who at the time held first place in the Conference.

On 21 December 2012, Wassmer left the club, and on 16 January 2013 he joined Cambridge United until the end of the season.

On 27 July 2013, Wassmer played in a friendly for former club Hayes & Yeading United and the match ended as a 3–1 victory over Wealdstone. In August, he was officially announced to have made his permanent return to the club and joined up with the first team straight away.

On 6 February 2014, Wassmer left Hayes & Yeading United and joined Margate of the Isthmian League Premier Division.

On 8 June 2018, Wassmer went on to sign for National League South side Woking, after having spells at Maidenhead United and Hampton & Richmond Borough After a prolonged injury problem, Wassmer made his Woking debut in early September, coming off the bench during a 1–1 draw with Concord Rangers. Following this, Wassmer went onto enjoy loan spells at both Metropolitan Police and Leatherhead to gain match fitness.

Shortly after his loan spell at Leatherhead came to an end, Wassmer went on to join National League side Maidstone on loan for 2 months.

On 25 January 2019 it was confirmed that Billericay had signed Wassmer.

On 22 November 2019, after enjoying a loan spell with the club, Wassmer joined National League South side Hampton & Richmond Borough for the third time. On 9 January 2022, the club released a statement saying that Wassmer's contract had been terminated due to an incident which took place during their fixture with Slough Town on 28 December 2021.

On 14 January 2022, following his release from Hampton, Wassmer returned to Hayes & Yeading United.

On 25 March 2023, Wassmer joined Gosport Borough on loan for remainder of the season.

== Career statistics ==
As of match played 22 April 2023

Appearances and goals by club, season and competition
Club	Season	League			FA Cup		League Cup		Other		Total	
Club	Season	Division	Apps	Goals	Apps	Goals	Apps	Goals	Apps	Goals	Apps	Goals
Hayes & Yeading United	2009–10	Conference Premier	2	0	0	0	—		0	0	2	0
Hayes & Yeading United	2010–11	Conference Premier	19	0	0	0	—		0	0	19	0
Hayes & Yeading United	Total		21	0	0	0	—		0	0	21	0
Crawley Town (loan)	2010–11	Conference Premier	12	2	—		—		—		12	2
Crawley Town	2011–12	League Two	13	2	0	0	1	0	1 (Note: Appearance(s) in Football League Trophy)	0	15	2
Crawley Town	2012–13	League One	0	0	0	0	0	0	0	0	0	0
Crawley Town	Total		13	2	0	0	1	0	1	0	15	2
Fleetwood Town (loan)	2011–12	Conference Premier	3	0	1	0	—		0	0	4	0
Dagenham & Redbridge (loan)	2011–12	League Two	1	0	—		—		—		1	0
Cambridge United	2012–13	Conference Premier	17	0	—		—		—		17	0
Hayes & Yeading United	2013–14	Conference South	23	0	2	0	—		2 (Note: Appearance(s) in FA Trophy)	0	27	0
Margate	2014–15	Isthmian League Premier Division	36	1	2	0	—		4 (Note: Two appearances in Alan Turvey Trophy, two appearances in Isthmian League play-offs)	0	42	1
Margate	2015–16	National League South	34	1	3	1	—		1	0	38	2
Margate	Total		70	2	5	1	0	0	5	0	80	2
Maidenhead United	2016–17	National League South	6	0	0	0	—		1	0	7	0
Gosport Borough (loan)	2016–17	National League South	4	0	—		—		—		4	0
Kingstonian (loan)	2016–17	Isthmian League Premier Division	4	0	—		—		—		4	0
Hampton & Richmond Borough	2017–18	National League South	33	8	1	0	—		6 (Note: Three appearances in FA Trophy, three in National League South play-offs)	0	40	8
Woking	2018–19	National League South	1	0	—		—		0	0	1	0
Metropolitan Police (loan)	2018–19	Southern League Premier Division South	2	0	2	0	—		0	0	4	0
Leatherhead (loan)	2018–19	Isthmian League Premier Division	8	1	—		—		0	0	8	1
Maidstone United (loan)	2018–19	National League	6	0	—		—		0	0	6	0
Billericay Town	2018–19	National League South	12	1	—		—		—		12	1
Billericay Town	2019–20	National League South	5	1	—		—		0	0	5	1
Billericay Town	Total		17	2	—		—		0	0	17	2
Hampton & Richmond Borough (loan)	2019–20	National League South	6	1	2	0	—		0	0	8	1
Hampton & Richmond Borough	2019–20	National League South	8	1	—		—		2	0	10	1
Hampton & Richmond Borough	2020–21	National League South	4	1	3	0	—		0	0	7	1
Hampton & Richmond Borough	2021–22	National League South	16	2	3	0	—		1	0	20	2
Hampton & Richmond Borough	Total		28	4	6	0	—		3	0	37	4
Hayes & Yeading United	2021–22	Southern League Premier Division South	13	1	—		—		—		13	1
Hayes & Yeading United	2022–23	Southern League Premier Division South	31	4	3	0	—		1	0	35	4
Hayes & Yeading United	Total		44	5	3	0	—		1	0	48	5
Gosport Borough (loan)	2022–23	Southern League Premier Division South	3	0	—		—		—		3	0
Career total			320	27	22	1	1	0	19	0	362	28
