= 2022–23 Aldershot Town F.C. season =

2022-23 Aldershot Town season

Aldershot Town F.C.
2022-23 season
- Owner: Shahid Azeem
- Chairman: Shahid Azeem
- Manager: Mark Molesley (until 15 October); Ross McNeilly (from 17 October to 2 April); Tommy Widdrington (from 2 April 2023)
- Stadium: The EBB Stadium
- Vanarama National League: 18th
- FA Cup: Fourth qualifying round
- FA Trophy: Quarter-finals
- Top goalscorer: League: Inih Effiong (14); All: Inih Effiong (17)
- Highest home attendance: 10,071 v Wrexham (19 November 2022)
- Lowest home attendance: 996 v Gateshead (3 December 2022)
- Average home league attendance: 2583
- Biggest win: 5-1 v FC Halifax Town (17 September 2022)
- Biggest defeat: 6-1 v Torquay United (1 November 2022)
Home colours	Away colours

Aldershot Town Football Club played their 31st season in 2022–23; this was the club's ninth consecutive season in the Vanarama National League. In addition to the league, they also competed in the FA Cup and the FA Trophy.

== Season summary ==
=== Pre-season ===
On 2 July 2022, Aldershot Town played Isthmian South Central Division side Badshot Lea in Aldershot's first pre-season friendly of the season. 2 weeks later, on 16 July, the Shots then defeated Slough Town of the National League South 3–0. They then managed to beat Crawley Town 3–2 on 23 July in their third club friendly of the summer and their only friendly at home. This was followed up with a 2–2 away draw to Southern League Division One side A.F.C. Totton The Shots then ended their pre-season campaign with a 0–0 tie against Havant and Waterlooville
