= John Dempster (footballer) =

Football player and manager (born 1983)

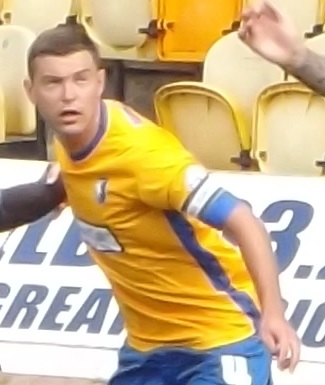
- Dempster playing for Mansfield Town in 2013

Personal information
- Full name: John Dempster
- Date of birth: 1 April 1983 (age 43)
- Place of birth: Kettering, England
- Position: Centre back

Senior career*
Years	Team	Apps	(Gls)
2001–2006	Rushden & Diamonds	66	(4)
2006–2007	Oxford United	23	(0)
2007–2011	Kettering Town	183	(21)
2011–2012	Crawley Town	17	(2)
2011	→ Kettering Town (loan)	3	(0)
2011–2012	→ Mansfield Town (loan)	12	(3)
2012–2015	Mansfield Town	69	(2)
2012	→ Tamworth (loan)	6	(1)
Total		379	(33)

International career
2004	Scotland U21	1	(0)

Managerial career
- 2015–2019: Mansfield Town (academy manager)
- 2018: Mansfield Town (caretaker)
- 2019: Mansfield Town
- 2020–2022: Coventry City U18s
- 2022–2024: Coventry City U21s
- 2024–: Coventry City (first team coach)
- * Club domestic league appearances and goals

John Dempster (born 1 April 1983) is an English football coach and former player who is a first-team coach at Coventry City. Born in England, he made one appearance for the Scotland U21 national team.

== Club career ==
=== Rushden & Diamonds ===
Born in Kettering, Northamptonshire, Dempster began his career playing in the Football League for Rushden & Diamonds.

=== Oxford United ===
In 2006 Dempster signed for Oxford United during the January transfer window.

=== Kettering Town ===
From 2007 he has been playing for Kettering Town, where he captained the side to promotion to the Conference Premier, and was awarded Players' Player and Supporters' player.

=== Crawley Town ===
Following a string of impressive performances for Kettering Town, Dempster was signed by Crawley Town for an undisclosed fee in the 2011 transfer window, in the middle of their promotion-winning season that saw Crawley elevated to the Football League.

=== Mansfield Town ===
In May 2012, Dempster was released by Crawley after being deemed surplus to requirements following a handful of League 2 appearances that year and a loan spell at Conference Premier club Mansfield Town. He signed for Mansfield permanently for the 2012/13 season. After an injury and a spell on loan at Tamworth, Dempster established himself as a regular in the side that went on to win the Conference Premier on the last day of the season. Dempster signed a new contract at The Stags for 2013/14, making a return to the Football League. He captained the team in the absence of Adam Murray.

== International career ==
Dempster is a former Scotland under-21 international, and has also represented Scotland at under-20 level. He is eligible to play for Scotland because his father is from Ayrshire.

He was also selected for Paul Fairclough's England National XI side back in 2006.

== Coaching and managerial career ==
Dempster accepted the position of academy manager at Mansfield at the end of the 2014–15 season. On the resignation of club manager Steve Evans in February 2018, Dempster assumed the role of caretaker manager, until new manager David Flitcroft was confirmed 1 March 2018.

Dempster was promoted to the position of Mansfield Town manager when Flitcroft's contract was terminated 14 May 2019. He was sacked on 14 December 2019 following a poor run of form.

On 7 February 2020, Dempster was appointed as Coventry City's Lead Professional Development Phase Coach, which saw him take charge of the club's under-18 team.

On 2 August 2022, Dempster was appointed as Coventry City's Senior Professional Development Phase Coach, which saw him take charge of the club's under-21 team.

On 9 August 2024, Dempster was appointed as a first-team coach at Coventry City.

== Managerial statistics ==
As of match played 14 December 2019

Managerial record by team and tenure
Team	From	To	Record				
Team	From	To	P	W	D	L	Win %
Mansfield Town	14 May 2019	14 December 2019	28	7	11	10	25.0
Total			28	7	11	10	25.0

== Honours ==
Rushden & Diamonds

- Football League Third Division: 2002–03

Kettering Town

- Conference North: 2007–08

Crawley Town

- Football League Two third-place promotion: 2011–12
- Conference Premier: 2010–11

Mansfield Town

- Conference Premier: 2012–13
