= Stafford Browne =

English footballer

Personal information
- Date of birth: 4 January 1972 (age 54)
- Place of birth: Hastings, England
- Position: Striker

Senior career*
Years	Team	Apps	(Gls)
1997–1998	Hastings Town	?	(29)
1998	Brighton & Hove Albion	3	(0)
1998–1999	Welling United	?	(?)
1999–2000	Yeovil Town	3	(0)
2000	Dagenham & Redbridge	3	(1)
2000–2002	Aldershot Town	63	(34)
2002	Grays Athletic	?	(?)
2002	St Albans City	9	(3)
2002–2003	Aldershot Town	23	(6)
2003–2004	Kingstonian	?	(?)
2004–2005	Wivenhoe Town	42	(23)
2005–2007	Worthing	38	(17)
2007–2008	Heybridge Swifts	?	(?)
2009–?	AFC Uckfield	?	(?)
- * Club domestic league appearances and goals

Stafford Browne (born 4 January 1972) is a former footballer who played as a striker. He made three Football League appearances for Brighton & Hove Albion.

Browne was born in Hastings and played football for various Sussex teams including Ringmer, Lewes, Horsham and Hastings Town. It was at Hastings where he ended the season top scorer and joining Brighton for the 1998–99 season and making three appearances.

After his spell at Brighton, Browne played for various Conference and Isthmian League sides, before dropping down to the Sussex County League to play for AFC Uckfield where the played as a center back.
