= Scott Davies (footballer, born 1988) =

Irish footballer (born 1988)

Personal information
- Full name: Scott Myles Edward Davies
- Date of birth: 10 March 1988 (age 38)
- Place of birth: Aylesbury, England
- Height: 1.80 m (5 ft 11 in)
- Positions: Defender; midfielder

Team information
- Current team: Aldershot Town (player-manager)
- Number: 14

Youth career
- ?–2001: Watford
- 2001–2002: Wycombe Wanderers
- 2002–2006: Reading

Senior career*
Years	Team	Apps	(Gls)
2006–2011	Reading	4	(0)
2006	→ Yeading (loan)	1	(0)
2007–2008	→ Aldershot Town (loan)	28	(9)
2008–2009	→ Aldershot Town (loan)	41	(13)
2009–2010	→ Wycombe Wanderers (loan)	15	(3)
2010	→ Yeovil Town (loan)	4	(0)
2010	→ Wycombe Wanderers (loan)	8	(1)
2011	→ Bristol Rovers (loan)	7	(0)
2011–2012	Crawley Town	20	(2)
2011–2012	→ Aldershot Town (loan)	8	(1)
2013–2014	Oxford United	34	(1)
2014–2015	Dunstable Town	30	(3)
2015–2016	Wealdstone	53	(4)
2016–2017	Oxford City	42	(3)
2017–2018	Chelmsford City	30	(3)
2018–2019	Slough Town	38	(0)
2019	Kingstonian	5	(1)
2019	Harlow Town	9	(1)
2019–2026	Slough Town	207	(15)
2020	→ Biggleswade Town (loan)	1	(0)
2020	→ Staines Town (loan)	1	(0)
2020	→ Biggleswade Town (loan)	8	(0)
2021	→ Beaconsfield Town (loan)	1	(0)
2022	→ Risborough Rangers (loan)	1	(0)
2026–	Aldershot Town	0	(0)

International career
- Republic of Ireland U19
2009–2010	Republic of Ireland U21	3	(0)

Managerial career
- 2022–2026: Slough Town
- 2026–: Aldershot Town
- * Club domestic league appearances and goals as of 21:19, 23 April 2026 (UTC)

Scott Myles Edward Davies (born 10 March 1988) is an Irish professional football manager and former player who played as a midfielder. He is currently a player-manager for National League club Aldershot Town.

== Career ==
=== Early career ===
Born in Aylesbury, Buckinghamshire, and attending Aylesbury Grammar School, Davies started his career with Watford's youth system after being spotted whilst playing for the Aylesbury senior team.

In 2001, he moved to Wycombe Wanderers before moving to Reading in 2002. In September 2006, Davies joined Conference South side Yeading on loan, scoring the winning goal away at Ramsgate which saw Yeading go on to face Nottingham Forest.

=== Aldershot Town (loan) ===
Davies joined Aldershot Town on loan in summer 2007. He was given the number 16 shirt. He made his professional debut in the 2–1 win over Kidderminster Harriers on 11 August 2007, he also scored his first goal in the game. He then scored both goals in a 2–1 win over Histon.

At the end of 2007–08 season, Aldershot were promoted. He also won the Conference National goal of the season, with his injury time goal against Torquay United. Davies joined Aldershot for the second time on 23 July 2009.

He made his first Football League appearance in a 3–2 win over Bradford City on 30 August 2009, he also scored his first goal of the season.

=== Reading ===
He made his debut for Reading against Nottingham Forest on 8 August 2009. He made four more appearances before leaving on loan.

=== Wycombe Wanderers (loan) ===
On 16 October 2009, Davies signed a one-month loan deal with Wycombe Wanderers, making his debut in the 1–1 home draw with Colchester United on 17 October. In his third appearance, he scored two goals in their 3–2 home defeat against Walsall. On 5 November 2009, Davies' loan was extended until the New Year. On 4 January 2010 his loan was extended until 16 January. On 16 March he joined Yeovil Town on a one-month loan deal, playing four games for the club before returning to Reading.

On 9 September 2010 Davies returned to Wycombe on a three-month loan deal.

=== Crawley Town ===
Davies was released by Reading at the end of the 2010–11 season and on 31 May 2011, he signed for League Two side Crawley Town on a free transfer. He made his debut against Macclesfield Town in a 2–0 win but after failing to get regular first team football he joined Aldershot Town on loan on 27 October 2011. He scored his first and only goal for Aldershot in a 2–1 loss to Gillingham on 19 November 2011. After playing just one game during the 2012–13 season Davies had his contract at Crawley terminated by mutual consent on 31 December 2012.

=== Oxford United ===
Davies was signed on non-contract terms by Oxford United on 1 March 2013. Manager Chris Wilder said of him "He's a player we think is definitely worth a look at. He has a very good pedigree and is someone we have kept an eye on for a while now so we are delighted that he has signed for us." He scored his first goal for the club in a 3–2 defeat at former club Aldershot Town on 1 April 2013. On 17 May 2013, Davies confirmed via his Twitter account that he had agreed a new one-year deal with the club, keeping him at Oxford until the end of the 2013–14 season. Davies was later released at the end of the contract and signed for Dunstable Town.

=== Non-League ===
During the summer of 2016, Davies joined Oxford City where he was named as captain.

On 30 May 2017, Davies signed for fellow National League South club Chelmsford City. On 19 March 2018, Davies left the club.

In the same month, Davies joined Slough Town. During his time at Slough, Davies helped the club to win promotion to the National League South via the Southern League play-off's. In February 2019, Davies left the club to sign for Kingstonian. In March 2019, after five games with Kingstonian, Davies joined Harlow Town owing to a managerial change at Kingstonian. On 9 March 2019, Davies made his debut for Harlow in a 3–1 home win against Kingstonian. Davies re-joined Slough in July 2019.

On 4 February 2020, Davies along with his teammate Louis Soares joined Southern League Premier Division Central side Biggleswade Town on loan.

The following week he joined Staines Town on dual registration.

Davies also joined Bracknell Town on dual registration in March 2023 but did not make any appearances.

== Coaching and management career ==
On 23 November 2022, Davies was appointed manager of Slough Town, also serving as a player for the team, having taken on the role of caretaker manager the previous week. Having lost only once in the first month of the 2024–25 season, he was named Manager of the Month for August 2024.

On 27 April 2026, Davies returned to National League club Aldershot Town as first-team manager.

== International career ==
Davies was called up to the Republic of Ireland under-21 squad to face Germany on 10 February 2009. However, he was an unused substitute in the 1–1 draw.

== Personal life ==
Davies has studied for a degree in Professional Sports Writing and Broadcasting, and has written for The Non-League Paper. He has written about his long term gambling addiction from early in his career to 2015 where he estimates he lost over £200,000 whilst gambling, and his subsequent work educating other footballers around this subject.

== Career statistics ==
As of end of 2025-26 season

Appearances and goals by club, season and competition
Club	Season	League			FA Cup		League Cup		Other		Total	
Club	Season	Division	Apps	Goals	Apps	Goals	Apps	Goals	Apps	Goals	Apps	Goals
Reading	2006–07	Premier League	0	0	0	0	0	0	—		0	0
Reading	2007–08	Premier League	0	0	0	0	0	0	—		0	0
Reading	2008–09	Championship	0	0	0	0	0	0	0	0	0	0
Reading	2009–10	Championship	4	0	0	0	1	0	—		5	0
Reading	2010–11	Championship	0	0	0	0	0	0	0	0	0	0
Reading	Total		4	0	0	0	1	0	0	0	5	0
Yeading (loan)	2006–07	Conference South	1	0	1	1	—		0	0	2	1
Aldershot Town (loan)	2007–08	Conference Premier	28	9	1	0	—		3 (Note: One appearance in FA Trophy, two appearances in Conference League Cup)	0	32	9
Aldershot Town (loan)	2008–09	League Two	41	13	3	0	0	0	1 (Note: Appearance(s) in Football League Trophy)	1	45	14
Aldershot Town (loan)	Total		69	22	4	0	0	0	4	1	77	23
Wycombe Wanderers (loan)	2009–10	League One	15	3	2	1	—		0	0	17	4
Yeovil Town (loan)	2009–10	League One	4	0	—		—		0	0	4	0
Wycombe Wanderers (loan)	2010–11	League Two	8	1	1	0	—		1	1	10	2
Bristol Rovers (loan)	2010–11	League One	7	0	—		—		—		7	0
Crawley Town	2011–12	League Two	20	2	0	0	1	0	0	0	21	2
Crawley Town	2012–13	League One	0	0	0	0	0	0	1	0	1	0
Crawley Town	Total		20	2	0	0	1	0	1	0	22	2
Aldershot Town (loan)	2011–12	League Two	8	1	3	0	—		0	0	11	1
Oxford United	2012–13	League Two	12	1	0	0	0	0	—		13	1
Oxford United	2013–14	League Two	22	0	5	1	0	0	1	0	28	1
Oxford United	Total		34	1	5	1	0	0	1	0	40	2
Dunstable Town	2014–15	Southern League; Premier Division	30	3	3	1	—		4 (Note: One appearance and a goal in the FA Trophy, two appearances in the Southern League Cup, one appearance and a goal in the Bedfordshire Senior Cup)	2	37	6
Wealdstone	2014–15	Conference South	11	1	—		—		—		11	1
Wealdstone	2015–16	National League South	42	3	4	1	—		4 (Note: Two appearances in FA Trophy, one appearance in Middlesex Senior Cup, one appearance in Middlesex Senior Charity Cup)	0	50	4
Wealdstone	Total		53	4	4	1	—		4	0	61	5
Oxford City	2016–17	National League South	42	3	2	0	—		3 (Note: One appearance in FA Trophy, two appearances in Oxfordshire Senior Cup)	0	47	3
Chelmsford City	2017–18	National League South	30	3	4	0	—		5 (Note: Two appearances in FA Trophy, three appearances in Essex Senior Cup)	0	39	3
Slough Town	2017–18	Southern League; Premier Division	13	0	0	0	—		2 (Note: Appearances in Southern League Premier Division play-offs)	0	15	0
Slough Town	2018–19	National League South	25	0	7	0	—		3 (Note: Appearances in Berks & Bucks Senior Cup)	0	35	0
Slough Town	Total		38	0	7	0	—		5	0	50	0
Kingstonian	2018–19	Isthmian League; Premier Division	5	1	—		—		—		5	1
Harlow Town	2018–19	Isthmian League; Premier Division	9	1	—		—		—		9	1
Slough Town	2019–20	National League South	26	1	2	0	—		3 (Note: One appearance in FA Trophy, one appearance and one goal in Berks & Bucks Senior Cup, one appearance in National League South play-offs)	1	31	2
Slough Town	2020–21	National League South	0	0	0	0	—		0	0	0	0
Slough Town	2021–22	National League South	34	1	0	0	—		3 (Note: Appearance(s) in FA Trophy)	0	37	1
Slough Town	2022–23	National League South	41	3	0	0	—		2 (Note: One appearance in FA Trophy, one appearance and one goal in Berks & Bucks Senior Cup)	0	43	3
Slough Town	2023–24	National League South	38	3	7	1	—		1 (Note: Appearance in Berks & Bucks Senior Cup)	0	46	4
Slough Town	2024–25	National League South	42	5	4	0	—		3	0	49	5
Slough Town	2025–26	National League South	26	2	6	0	—		4 (Note: One appearance in FA Trophy, three appearances in Berks & Bucks Senior Cup)	0	36	2
Slough Town	Total		207	15	19	1	—		16	1	242	17
Biggleswade Town (loan)	2019–20	Southern League; Premier Division Central	1	0	—		—		—		1	0
Staines Town (loan)	2019–20	Isthmian League; South Central Division	1	0	—		—		—		1	0
Biggleswade Town (loan)	2020–21	Southern League; Premier Division Central	8	0	2	0	—		1	0	11	0
Beaconsfield Town (loan)	2021–22	Southern League; Premier Division South	1	0	0	0	—		1 (Note: Appearance in Southern League Cup)	0	2	0
Risborough Rangers (loan)	2022–23	Spartan South Midlands FL; Premier Division	1	0	0	0	—		0	0	1	0
Bracknell Town (loan)	2022–23	Southern League; Premier Division South	0	0	0	0	—		0	0	0	0
Career total			596	60	55	6	2	0	46	5	699	71

== Managerial statistics ==
As of match played 21 November 2026

Managerial record by team and tenure
Team	From	To	Record					Ref.
Team	From	To	P	W	D	L	Win %	Ref.
Slough Town	15 November 2022	27 April 2026	197	71	51	75	36.0	
Aldershot Town	27 April 2026	Present	25	9	5	11	36.0	
Total			222	80	56	86	36.0	—

== Honours ==
=== As a player ===
Aldershot Town

- Conference National: 2008

=== As a manager ===
Individual

- National League South Manager of the Month: August 2024
