= John Grant (footballer, born 1981) =

English footballer (born 1981)

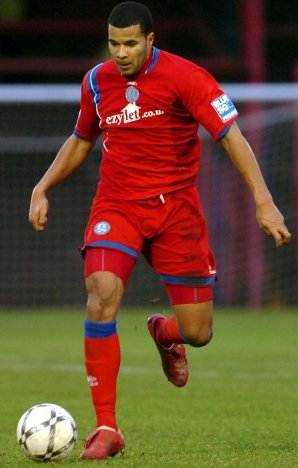
- Grant playing for Aldershot Town in 2008

Personal information
- Full name: John Anthony Carlton Grant
- Date of birth: 9 August 1981 (age 45)
- Place of birth: Manchester, England
- Height: 5 ft 11 in (1.80 m)
- Position: Striker

Senior career*
Years	Team	Apps	(Gls)
1998–2002	Crewe Alexandra	7	(0)
2001–2002	Northwich Victoria	11	(4)
2002–2003	Hereford United	26	(4)
2003–2004	Telford United	33	(6)
2004–2005	Shrewsbury Town	19	(2)
2005–2006	Halifax Town	49	(13)
2006–2010	Aldershot Town	127	(47)
2010	→ Oxford United (loan)	8	(0)
2010–2011	Barrow	5	(0)
2011	Macclesfield Town	4	(0)
2013	Droylsden	9	(0)
Total		298	(76)

International career
2007	England C	4	(1)
- * Club domestic league appearances and goals

John Anthony Carlton Grant (born 9 August 1981) is an English former footballer who last played for Droylsden as a striker and previously played for a variety of other English football clubs.

== Club career ==
=== Crewe Alexandra ===
Born in Manchester, Greater Manchester, Grant started his career at Crewe Alexandra who were at the time playing in the Division One. He said his brother Daniel Grant, a former schoolboy player at Manchester United, inspired him to play football so he signed in July 1999 and made his debut against Crystal Palace on the opening day of the 1999–2000 season. He was also a promising basketball player and trialed with Manchester Giants

He was later loaned to Hyde United, and Northwich Victoria.

=== 2002 to 2005 ===
In the 2002 close season, Grant signed for Hereford United, before going on to join the now defunct Telford United in July 2003. In the summer of 2004, Grant then signed for Shrewsbury Town, who had just beaten Aldershot Town in the Conference play-off final.

=== Halifax Town ===
Grant was on the move again in March 2005, when he joined Halifax Town. Grant played and scored for Halifax Town in the 2006 Conference play-off final, at Leicester City's Walkers Stadium, against his former club Hereford United. Halifax Town lost the final. That season Grant finished as Halifax Town's top scorer with 14 goals. Despite being offered a new contract by Halifax Town, he decided to join Aldershot Town in the summer of 2006.

=== Aldershot Town ===
In July 2006, Grant signed for Aldershot Town. He scored twice on his debut against Gravesend & Northfleet, on the opening day of the 2006–07 season. At the end of the season, Grant was Aldershot Town's top scorer with 23 goals and he was voted the fans 'Player of the Year'.

In December 2007, Grant scored his first and only senior hat-trick against Salisbury City. In February 2008, he committed himself to the club until the end of the 2009–10 season. Grant ended the 2007–08 season as top-scorer with 25 goals, as Aldershot Town won the Conference National title and the Conference League Cup. He was also one of five Aldershot Town players that were named in the Conference Team of the Year.

Grant made his 100th appearance for Aldershot Town against Notts County in September 2008 and he scored his 50th goal for Aldershot Town against Rotherham United in November 2008. In February 2010, he joined Oxford United on loan until the end of the 2009–10 season.

=== Barrow ===
Grant was released by Aldershot at the end of the 2009–10 season. Subsequently, he joined Conference National club Barrow on 19 November 2010. He made his debut the following day as a substitute in a 1–1 draw with Grimsby Town. Grant left Barrow by mutual consent on 31 January 2011.

=== Macclesfield ===
On 5 August 2011 Grant signed for Macclesfield Town on a non-contract basis after training with the team during the pre-season. He made four appearances during the 2011–12 season, the last in a 0–2 home defeat to Southend United on 29 October 2011.

=== Droylsden ===
Having been without a club since his release from Macclesfield halfway through the 2011–12 season, Grant signed for struggling Conference North club Droylsden in March 2013, making his debut in a 4–0 defeat at Gloucester City on 12 March 2013. He made a further eight appearances during the 2012–13 season, failing to score.

== Career statistics ==
Appearances and goals by club, season and competition
Club	Season	League			FA Cup		League Cup		Other		Total	
Club	Season	Division	Apps	Goals	Apps	Goals	Apps	Goals	Apps	Goals	Apps	Goals
Crewe Alexandra	1999–2000	Division One	4	0	0	0	2	0	0	0	6	0
Crewe Alexandra	2000–01	Division One	2	0	0	0	2	0	0	0	4	0
Crewe Alexandra	2001–02	Division One	1	0	0	0	0	0	0	0	1	0
Total			7	0	0	0	4	0	0	0	11	0
Northwich Victoria	2001–02	Conference	11	4	0	0	0	0	1 (Note: Appearance(s) in FA Trophy)	0	12	4
Total			11	4	0	0	0	0	1	0	12	4
Hereford United	2002–03	Conference	26	4	0	0	0	0	0	0	26	4
Total			26	4	0	0	0	0	0	0	26	4
Telford United	2003–04	Conference	33	6	4	0	0	0	3	2	40	8
Total			33	6	4	0	0	0	3	2	40	8
Shrewsbury Town	2004–05	League Two	19	2	0	0	1	0	1 (Note: Appearance(s) in Football League Trophy)	0	21	2
Total			19	2	0	0	1	0	1	0	21	2
Halifax Town	2004–05	Conference Premier	8	1	0	0	0	0	0	0	8	0
Halifax Town	2005–06	Conference Premier	41	12	2	0	0	0	3 (Note: 1 appearance(s) in FA Trophy) (Note: 2 appearance(s) and one goal in Conference play-offs)	1	46	13
Total			49	13	2	0	0	0	3	1	54	14
Aldershot Town	2006–07	Conference Premier	41	17	5	3	0	0	0	0	46	20
Aldershot Town	2007–08	Conference Premier	34	21	1	0	0	0	2 (Note: 1 appearance(s) in Conference Shield)	0	37	21
Aldershot Town	2008–09	League Two	35	6	3	1	1	0	1	0	40	7
Aldershot Town	2009–10	League Two	17	3	2	0	1	0	0	0	20	3
Total			127	47	11	4	2	0	3	0	145	51
→ Oxford United (loan)	2009–10	Conference Premier	8	0	0	0	0	0	0	0	8	0
Barrow	2010–11	Conference Premier	5	0	0	0	0	0	1	0	6	0
Macclesfield Town	2011–12	League Two	4	0	0	0	0	0	1	0	5	0
Droylsden	2012–13	Conference North	9	0	0	0	0	0	0	0	9	0
Career total			298	76	17	4	7	0	13	3	335	83

== England National Game XI ==
He also made his England National Game XI debut in May 2007 against the Republic of Ireland. Grant was in the squad that won that year's Four Nations Tournament and scored against Scotland on his full debut in the 3–0 victory on 25 May 2007.

== Honours ==
Aldershot Town

- Conference Premier: 2008
- Conference League Cup: 2008
