= 2008–09 Aldershot Town F.C. season =

Aldershot Town
2008–09 season
- Manager: Gary Waddock
- Stadium: Recreation Ground
- Football League Two: 15th
- FA Cup: Second round
- League Cup: First round
- League Trophy: First round
- Hampshire Senior Cup: Third round
- Top goalscorer: League: Scott Davies (8); All: Scott Davies and Kirk Hudson (9)
- Highest home attendance: 5,023 (18 October vs Brentford)
- Lowest home attendance: 2,090 (10 March vs Shrewsbury Town)
- Average home league attendance: 3,232 (26 senior squad league and cup matches)
Home colours	Away colours	Third colours

The 2008–09 season of Aldershot Town Football Club was the 17th year of football played by the club and the first season in Football League Two, the highest level achieved by the club up to that time.

== Team kit ==
The team kit for the 2008–09 season is produced by Carbrini Sportswear. The home shirt will be primarily Red with blue panels with the away shirt being yellow. On 6 December 2008 the blue third kit was launched.

== Match results ==
=== Friendlies ===
Date	Opponent	Venue	Result	Attendance	Scorers
5 July 2008	Alton Town	Away	Won 1–0	809	Pasquale Abiuso
12 July 2008	Chelsea XI	Home	Drew 2–2	1,954	Kirk Hudson, Marvin Morgan
17 July 2008	Crystal Palace	Home	Lost 3–4	1,436	John Grant (2), Marvin Morgan
19 July 2008	Staines Town	Away	Won 2–0	N/A	Marvin Morgan, Danny Hylton
22 July 2008	Maidenhead United	Away	Won 5–1	N/A	Marvin Morgan, Kirk Hudson(2), Junior Mendes, Scott Donnelly
26 July 2008	Leyton Orient	Home	Lost 0–1	950	-
29 July 2008	Tottenham Hotspur	Home	Lost 1–3	1,830	Danny Hylton
2 August 2008	Charlton Athletic	Home	Won 2–0	875	Anthony Charles, John Grant

=== Football League Two ===
Date	Opponent	Venue	Result	Attendance	Scorers
9 August 2008	Accrington Stanley	Away	Won 1–0	1,805	Scott Donnelly
16 August 2008	Bournemouth	Home	Draw 1–1	4,564	Louis Soares
23 August 2008	Shrewsbury Town	Away	Lost 0–1	5,422	-
30 August 2008	Bradford City	Home	Won 3–2	3,805	Ben Harding, Marvin Morgan, Scott Davies
6 September 2008	Darlington	Home	Won 2–1	3,460	Marvin Morgan, Louie Soares
13 September 2008	Luton Town	Away	Lost 1–3	6,462	John Grant
20 September 2008	Gillingham	Home	Won 2–1	4,198	Kirk Hudson, Scott Davies
27 September 2008	Notts County	Away	Lost 1–2	6,033	Anthony Charles
4 October 2008	Bury	Home	Draw 3–3	3,621	Rob Elvins, Scott Davies, Danny Hylton
11 October 2008	Macclesfield Town	Away	Lost 2–4	1,857	Kirk Hudson, Danny Hylton
18 October 2008	Brentford	Home	Draw 1–1	5,023	Scott Davies (pen)
22 October 2008	Chesterfield	Away	Lost 1–5	3,079	Kirk Hudson
25 October 2008	Rochdale	Away	Lost 1–3	2,750	Marvin Morgan
28 October 2008	Port Vale	Home	Won 1–0	3,049	Louis Soares
1 November 2008	Morecambe	Away	Lost 0–2	1,897	-
15 November 2008	Exeter City	Home	Won 1–0	3,784	John Grant
22 November 2008	Chester City	Away	Won 1–0	1,693	Marvin Morgan
26 November 2008	Lincoln City	Home	Won 2–0	2,625	Andy Sandell, Scott Davies
6 December 2008	Wycombe Wanderers	Home	Won 3–2	3,915	Kirk Hudson (2), Danny Hylton
20 December 2008	Grimsby Town	Home	Draw 2–2	3,605	Scott Davies (2) (2 pens)
26 December 2008	Barnet	Away	Won 3–0	2,729	Danny Hylton, Anthony Charles, Scott Davies
28 December 2008	Dagenham & Redbridge	Home	Lost 1–2	3,697	Kirk Hudson
17 January 2009	Macclesfield Town	Home	Draw 1–1	3,108	Kirk Hudson
20 January 2009	Notts County	Home	Draw 2–2	2,491	Ben Harding, Scott Davies
24 January 2009	Bury	Away	Lost 1–2	2,558	Scott Davies
27 January 2009	Brentford	Away	Lost 0–3	5,111	
31 January 2009	Rochdale	Home	Lost 2–4	3,018	Marvin Morgan, Scott Davies
14 February 2009	Exeter City	Away	Lost 2–3	4,840	Jake Robinson, Ben Harding
17 February 2009	Gillingham	Away	Draw 4–4	5,974	Andy Lindegaard, Dave Winfield, OG, Andy Sandell
21 February 2009	Morecambe	Home	Lost 0–2	2,872	
28 February 2009	Accrington Stanley	Home	Won 3–1	2,604	Kirk Hudson, Jake Robinson (2)
3 March 2009	Bournemouth	Away	Lost 0–2	4,556	
7 March 2009	Bradford City	Away	Lost 0–5	12,465	
10 March 2009	Shrewsbury Town	Home	Draw 0–0	2,090	
14 March 2009	Luton Town	Home	Won 2–1	3,098	Scott Davies, Kirk Hudson
17 March 2009	Rotherham United	Away	Won 2–1	2,769	John Grant (2)
21 March 2009	Darlington	Away	Lost 0–2	2,532	
28 March 2009	Grimsby Town	Away	Lost 0–1	7,095	
31 March 2009	Chesterfield	Home	Draw 1–1	2,482	Jake Robinson
4 April 2009	Rotherham United	Home	Lost 0–1	2,643	
7 April 2009	Port Vale	Home	Draw 0–0	4,140	
11 April 2009	Dagenham & Redbridge	Away	Lost 1–3	1,586	Danny Hylton
13 April 2009	Barnet	Home	Draw 1–1	2,597	Lewis Chalmers
18 April 2009	Wycombe Wanderers	Away	Lost 0–3	5,440	
25 April 2009	Chester City	Home	Draw 2–2	3,100	Kirk Hudson (2)
2 May 2009	Lincoln City	Away	Won 2–0	3,910	John Grant, Scott Davies

=== League Two Table ===
Pos	Team	Pld	W	D	L	GF	GA	GD	Pts
13	Lincoln City	46	14	17	15	53	52	+1	59
14	Rotherham United	46	21	12	13	60	46	+14	58 (Note: Rotherham United deducted 17 points for leaving administration without a Company Voluntary Agreement.)
15	Aldershot Town	46	14	12	20	59	80	−21	54
16	Accrington Stanley	46	13	11	22	42	59	−17	50
17	Barnet	46	11	15	20	56	74	−18	48

Source: The Football League
Rules for classification: 1) points; 2) goal difference; 3) number of goals scored.

=== FA Cup ===
Round	Date	Opponent	Venue	Result	Attendance	Goalscorers
1st round	8 November 2008	Rotherham United	Home	1–1	2,632	John Grant
1st round replay	18 November 2008	Rotherham United	Away	Won 3–0	2,431 (174 away fans)	Kirk Hudson (2), Marvin Morgan
2nd round	29 November 2008	Millwall	Away	Lost 0–3	6,159 (1,590 away fans)	

=== Football League Cup ===
This was Aldershot Town's first ever season playing in the Football League Cup.

Round	Date	Opponent	Venue	Result	Attendance	Goalscorers
1st round	13 August 2008	Coventry City	Away	Lost 1–3	9,392 (869 away fans)	Marvin Morgan

=== Football League Trophy ===
Round	Date	Opponent	Venue	Result	Attendance	Goalscorers
1st round	2 September 2008	Swindon Town	Home	2–2*	1,814	Rob Elvins, Scott Davies(pen)

- *Swindon Town won 7–6 on penalties.

=== Hampshire Senior Cup ===
The Hampshire Senior Cup squad from Aldershot Town was composed of reserve team players.

Round	Date	Opponent	Result	Attendance	Scorers
2nd round	7 October 2008	Alresford Town	Won 3–2	N/A	John Grant, Marvin Morgan (2)
3rd round	9 December 2008	Basingstoke Town	Lost 1–2	285	Adam Mekki

== Events ==
This is a list of the significant events to occur at the club during the 2008–09 season, presented in chronological order. This list does not include match results, which are in the results section.

=== May 2008 ===
- 13 May: Aldershot Town's first signing since winning promotion to the Football League is Dean Howell from Conference National side Rushden & Diamonds.
- 15 May: Gary Waddock signs 25-year-old defender Chris Blackburn from Football League One side Swindon Town.
- 19 May: Aldershot Town's third signing since promotion is Woking F.C. striker Marvin Morgan.
- 27 May: Goalkeeper Nikki Bull signed a new two-year deal to stay with the club. However this was a surprise to many as it came just four days after the Chairman John McGinty released an official statement informing supporters of his departure after six years with the club. The Shots also confirmed on the official website that Captain Rhys Day had signed a one-year contract with the club and that Junior Mendes was committing until the end of the year (2008).

=== June 2008 ===
- 13 June: Aldershot Town are drawn against Coventry City in the Carling Cup first round draw.
- 16 June: The fixtures for the Football League Two season are released. The Shots will travel to Accrington Stanley on the opening day of the season. It will be exactly five years to the weekend when the two sides were paired together in the opening Conference season of 2003/2004.
- 24 June: Manager Gary Waddock and Coach Martin Kuhl both sign new three-year deals with the club.
- 25 June: Joel Grant joins Crewe Alexandra for a fee of £130,000, a club record sale.

=== July 2008 ===
- 15 July: It is announced that Jim Joyce has left Yeovil Town Football Club to join the Shots to take over from Sue Bowen as Club Physio.
- 23 July: The Shots sign 21-year-old Sheffield United Academy product Ben Starosta on a one-month loan deal, with a view to securing a permanent deal. They also boosted their squad by securing the services of Scott Davies on a second season-long loan from Reading FC.

=== November 2008 ===
- 18 November: Godalming Town defeated Aldershot Town XI 3–0 in a testimonial held for Paul 'Paddy' Hampshire who is battling against the incurable motor neuron disease and proceeds from the game were shared out between the Hampshire family's chosen charities; Woking Hospice and the M.N.D. charity.
- 29 November: Nikki Bull makes his 300th appearance for the Shots in the FA Cup defeat at Millwall Football Club.

=== December 2008 ===
- 6 December: New third kit launched.
- 13 December: Following an 11.30am pitch inspection Aldershot's League Two fixture against Rotherham United at the Don Valley Stadium was called off because of a waterlogged pitch.
- 18 December: The 9th Annual ATFC Christmas Carol Service was conducted by Chaplain, Rev Mike Pusey at Holy Trinity Church, Aldershot with players in attendance.
- 22 December: Football League clubs voted to introduce a 'Home Grown Players' rule, as proposed by The Football League Board, at a specially arranged EGM of clubs at Derby County. The new rule will come into effect from the beginning of next season. The 'Home Grown Players' rule will require at least four players from clubs' sixteen man matchday squads to be registered domestically, for a minimum of three seasons, prior to their 21st birthday.
- 28 December: Dagenham & Redbridge become the first side to beat Aldershot at the Recreation Ground in the Football League and snap an eleven-month unbeaten streak that lasted 20 league games. The previous home league defeat came back in January 2008 when Forest Green Rovers won 1–0.

=== January 2009 ===
- 2 January: Andy Sandell joins in a permanent move following a successful loan spell from Salisbury City while Shots defender Dave Winfield moves in the opposite direction on a month-long loan deal.
- 3 January: Aldershot's home league game against Notts County was postponed at 1.20pm when referee Chris Sarginson deemed the pitch unplayable.

=== February 2009 ===
- 2 February: Dave Winfield returns to Aldershot after a loan spell with Salisbury City. The club also sign goalkeeper Alex McCarthy and defender Andy Lindegaard on one-month loan deals.

=== March 2009 ===
- 27 March: Stevenage Borough sign Aldershot striker Junior Mendes on loan until the end of the season.

=== April 2009 ===
- 21 April: Aldershot Town announce they will release Rhys Day, Rob Elvins and Junior Mendes at the end of the season.

== Head To Head ==
Team	Miles [One Way]	Home Result	Fans Brought	Away Result	Fans Took	Points Gained
Accrington Stanley	250	3–1	81	1–0	606	6
Barnet	56	1–1	327	3–0	728	4
Bournemouth	77	1–1	1047	0–2	611	1
Bradford City	229	3–2	647	0–5	294	3
Brentford	36	1–1	1066	0–3	894	1
Bury	232	3–3	354	1–2	225	1
Chester City	231	2–2	226	1–0	286	4
Chesterfield	173	1–1	225	1–5	222	1
Dagenham & Redbridge	70	1–2	173	1–3	291	0
Darlington	272	2–1	296	0–2	250*	3
Exeter City	145	1–0	785	2–3	332	3
Gillingham	75	2–1	960	4–4	399	4
Grimsby Town	244	2–2	343	0–1	340	1
Lincoln City	177	2–0	209	2–0	359	6
Luton Town	58	2–1	783	1–3	810	3
Macclesfield Town	204	1–1	131	2–4	353	1
Morecambe	266	0–2	80	0–2	204	0
Notts County	150	2–2	171	1–2	511	1
Port Vale	181	1–0	242	0–0	128	4
Rochdale	237	2–4	292	1–3	256	0
Rotherham United	187	0–1	250	2–1	81	3
Shrewsbury Town	178	0–0	218	0–1	381	1
Wycombe Wanderers	45	3–2	842	0–3	600*	3

- *Approximate figure, exact attendances are not known.

== Goalscorers ==
- All Competitions

Name	League	FA Cup	League Cup	Football League Trophy	Hampshire Senior Cup	Total
Scott Davies	8	-	-	1	-	9
Kirk Hudson	7	2	-	-	-	9
Marvin Morgan	3	1	1	-	2	7
Danny Hylton	4	-	-	-	-	4
John Grant	2	1	-	-	1	4
Louis Soares	3	-	-	-	-	3
Anthony Charles	2	-	-	-	-	2
Rob Elvins	1	-	-	1	-	2
Scott Donnelly	1	-	-	-	-	1
Ben Harding	1	-	-	-	-	1
