= Aldershot Town F.C. =

Association football club in Aldershot, England

Aldershot Town
- Full name: Aldershot Town Football Club
- Nickname: The Shots
- Founded: 1992; 34 years ago
- Ground: Recreation Ground
- Capacity: 7,100 (2,000 seated)
- Chairman: Deane Wood
- Manager: Scott Davies
- League: National League
- 2025–26: National League, 20th of 24
- Website: theshots.co.uk
Home colours	Away colours	Third colours

Aldershot Town Football Club is a professional association football club based in Aldershot, Hampshire, England. The team competes in the National League, the fifth level of the English football league system.

The club was founded in the spring of 1992 after the closure of debt-ridden Fourth Division club Aldershot. Aldershot Town play at the Recreation Ground, which had also been the home ground of the previous club. Initially placed in the Isthmian League Third Division, Aldershot Town won the league in their debut 1992–93 season and won promotion out of the Second Division the following season. They won the First Division title in 1997–98 and the Premier Division in 2002–03 to gain a place in the Conference. They spent five seasons in the Conference, losing twice in the play-offs, before winning promotion into the Football League as Conference National and Conference League Cup champions under Gary Waddock's stewardship in 2007–08. They spent five seasons in League Two, reaching the play-offs in 2010, though were relegated back into non-League football and entered administration in May 2013. They reached the National League play-offs in 2017 and 2018 and have also won the FA Trophy in 2025.

== History ==
=== Formation and the Isthmian years ===
In March 1992, the town of Aldershot was without a football club after Aldershot F.C. became the first Football League team to fold during the football season since Accrington Stanley in 1962. The original Aldershot club had been in the Football League since 1932 and competed in the Third and Fourth Divisions. Promotion had been achieved as recently as 1987, but relegation followed two years later and debts well into six figures had almost brought about the club's demise in the summer of 1990. Despite a rescue package allowing the original winding-up order to be rescinded, the club's debts remained high and the club became insolvent just over 18 months later.

Aldershot Town was born later the same year, and began life competing in the Isthmian League Division Three. Despite Aldershot Town playing five divisions lower than the Football League, the attendance for their first competitive fixture was higher than the old team's last home tie, with attendances that season averaging around 2,000 at a level where attendances normally averaged around 100.

Ten successive victories were recorded under the guidance of former player Steve Wignall and Aldershot won the championship by an 18-point margin.

A further promotion and an FA Vase quarter-final placing was achieved in the 1993–94 season. When Steve Wignall departed to take charge of Colchester United midway through the 1994–95 season, former Nottingham Forest winger Steve Wigley took over. The club finished the 1994–95 season with a run of six successive victories, but missed out on promotion by goal difference. After narrowly missing out during the next two seasons Wigley left in July 1997 to become Youth Development Officer at Nottingham Forest. He was replaced by George Borg, another former Aldershot FC player.

Attendances continued to rise during this period and the final fixture of the 1997–98 Isthmian League First Division championship-winning season, at home to Berkhamsted Town, attracted 4,289 fans to the Recreation Ground – a league record.

The success under Borg continued with an Isthmian League Cup, two Hampshire Senior Cups and a runners-up spot in the Isthmian League Premier Division.

The club's reserves were reinstated in 2000–01 and entered the Suburban League. The FA Cup in 2000–01 saw Aldershot take on league opposition at The Recreation Ground for the first time since reforming, when Brighton & Hove Albion visited for a 1st Round tie in November and a record attendance of 7,500 saw the league team win. In the following season's FA Cup Aldershot held Bristol Rovers to a home draw in the First Round, but again missed out on the Second Round after losing the replay in Bristol.

George Borg resigned as manager in November 2001 after pressure from supporters and was replaced by Terry Brown. He won his first game in charge beating Newport IOW 1–0 in the Hampshire Senior Cup Semi-final Second Leg, taking The Shots on to win the final against Havant & Waterlooville. In Brown's first full season in charge he overhauled the squad, and by mid-November the Shots were top of the table, a position they did not relinquish for the remainder of the season, winning promotion to the Football Conference. After just 11 years, four promotions had now been achieved and just one more promotion was required for league football to return to Aldershot.

The club also retained the Hampshire Senior Cup with a 2–1 win over Bashley.

=== Conference years ===
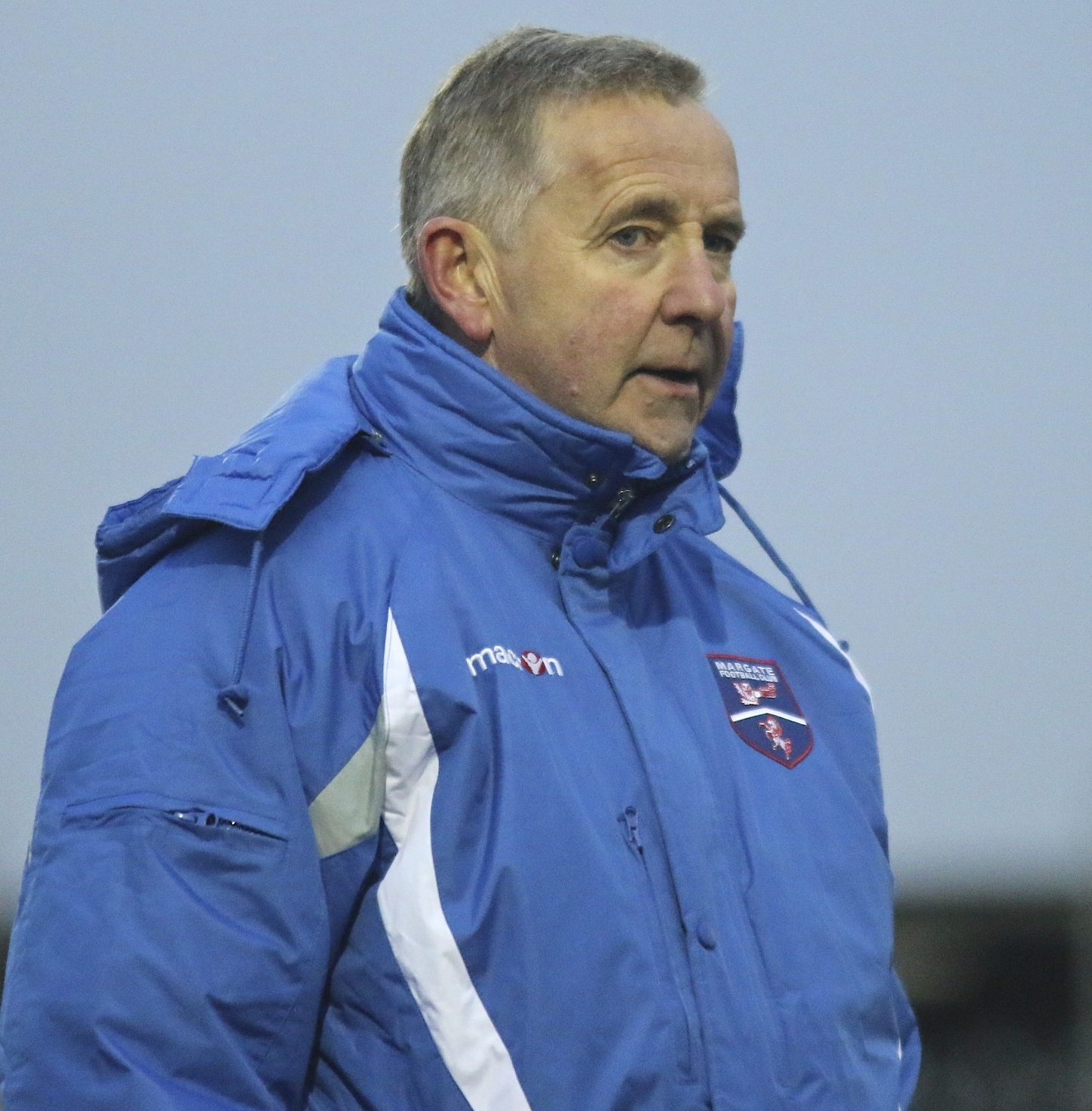
Terry Brown took over as manager in March 2002.

A crowd of 3,680 saw Aldershot's first game in the Conference, a 2–1 win over Accrington Stanley. The club went on to stay in the play-off positions in the league table for all but 3 days of the season. The Shots equalled their best ever run in the FA Cup, reaching the 2nd Round and losing 1–0 to Colchester United at Layer Road. The club reached their first FA Trophy semi-final, losing to eventual winners Hednesford Town and the average attendance for league matches at The Rec ended on a record high of 3,303.

A 1–1 draw against Tamworth on the last day of the season carried the Shots into the play-offs for a place in the Football League. Over two legs the Shots held their own against favourites Hereford United, drawing 1–1 at The Rec and 0–0 at Edgar Street. Extra time finished without any further score and the tie was concluded on penalties with the Shots winning 4–2. The 2004 Conference play-off Final against Shrewsbury Town finished 1–1 after extra time. Shrewsbury returned to the league with a 3–0 win in the penalty shoot-out.

In May 2004 the club officers made the decision to convert Aldershot Town to full-time professional status from the following July. In 2004–05 the Shots once again equalled their best ever run in the FA Cup as they reached the 2nd Round proper, where they lost 5–1 to Hartlepool United. After a slow start in the league, Aldershot improved their form and reached the play-offs after beating Scarborough in the last game of the season. The Shots won the first leg against Carlisle United 1–0 at home, but lost the away leg 2–1, giving a 2–2 aggregate score. Extra time could not separate the sides and the tie went to penalties, with Carlisle winning the shootout.

The next two seasons were less successful for Aldershot. 2005–06 saw the team suffer numerous injuries, and they struggled to 13th in the table. The team made it to the 2nd round of the FA Cup, losing 1–0 at home to Scunthorpe United. In the 2006–07 season the club finished 9th in the reformed 24 club Conference Premier. Terry Brown resigned, citing the poor health of his wife as the primary reason. Martin Kuhl took over as caretaker manager. They reached the 3rd round of the FA Cup for the first time, losing 4–2 at Bloomfield Road to Blackpool

==== Promotion to the Football League ====
Chart of yearly table positions since promotion to the Football Conference.

In May 2007 Gary Waddock was appointed the new manager, with Martin Kuhl reverting to his coaching position. The Shots started the season strongly, losing few games before the turn of the year. Jonny Dixon was sold to Brighton and Hove Albion in the January Transfer window for a then club record of £56,000. The Shots finished top of the Conference Premier with a record 101 points, and were promoted to the Football League, for the first time since the club was reformed ending the season on an 18-match undefeated run.

Aldershot also made it to the Conference League Cup Final after a 4–3 penalty shoot out victory over near neighbours Woking in the semi-final. The final, played at the Recreation Ground on 3 April, was against Rushden & Diamonds. With the scores 1–1 at full-time, then 3–3 after extra time, Aldershot won 4–3 on penalties.

=== Football League ===
Sixteen years after the demise of Aldershot F.C., the town of Aldershot had a Football League team again. The club retained much of the 2007–08 promotion winning team, and added several signings, both permanent and on loan. Gary Waddock and Martin Kuhl also committed their futures to the club by signing new three-year contracts. Joel Grant was sold to Crewe Alexandra for £130,000, a club record. On the opening day of the 2008–09 season, Aldershot Town won their first league game on their return to the Football League at Accrington Stanley 1–0. This was followed four days later by the club's first ever EFL Cup game, against Coventry City at the Ricoh Arena, which the Shots lost 3–1. The Shots finished fifteenth in League Two in their first season in the Football League.

Two months into the 2009–10 season, manager Gary Waddock and assistant Martin Kuhl accepted offers to join Wycombe Wanderers. Kevin Dillon, the former first-team coach of Reading, was appointed as Waddock's permanent successor in November 2009. Under the new management team Aldershot finished the season in sixth place, qualifying them for the play-offs, where they lost 3–0 on aggregate to Rotherham United.

In January 2011 Kevin Dillon left the club by mutual agreement, with the club lying 20th in League Two, after winning just 6 out of 22 league games. Dillon was replaced by Newport County manager Dean Holdsworth. Holdsworth succeeded in removing the threat of relegation, eventually guiding the club to 14th position in a run which included only 4 defeats in the second half of the season. Aldershot finished 11th in the 2011–12. A good run in the League Cup saw Aldershot take on Manchester United at home, which ended in a 3–0 victory for the Red Devils. Holdsworth was sacked by Aldershot on 20 February 2013 with the team in 20th place in League Two.

=== Administration and return to Conference ===
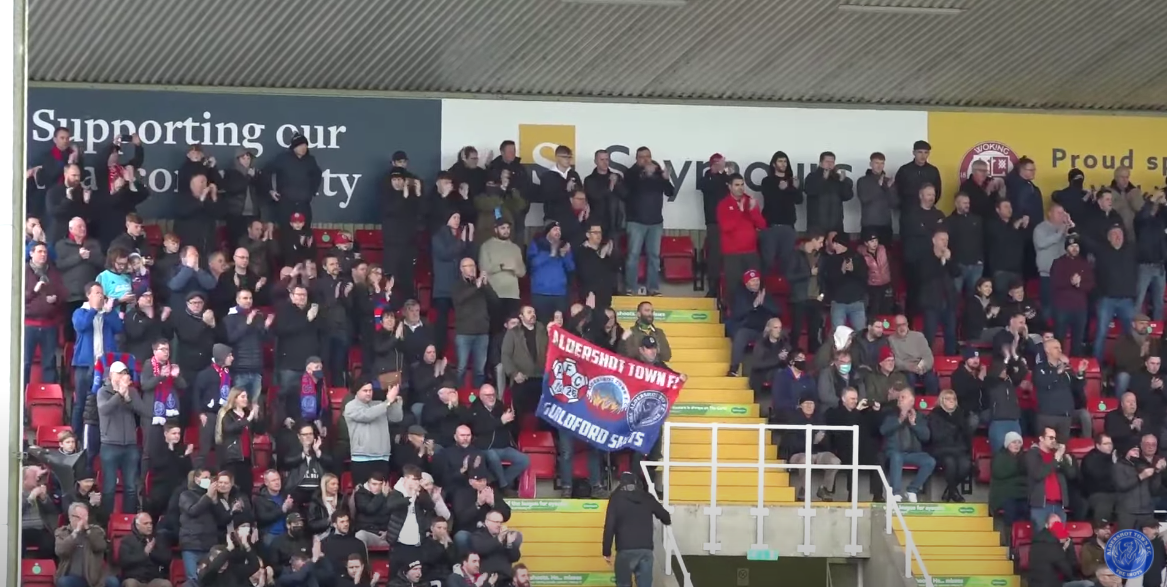
Aldershot Town fans in 2022, in an away match against Woking.

In the summer 2012, a major shareholder suffered a major stroke, debilitating him and creating a financial insecurity that would prove dangerous come the following year. In May 2013, Aldershot Town announced that they were in financial difficulties, with players' wages going unpaid. The Chief Executive, Andrew Mills, announced his resignation saying that there was no evidence that the major shareholder Kris Machala had the ability to fund the club. Director Tony Knights admitted that the club has been "haemorrhaging money". On 2 May 2013, just five days after their relegation from the Football League, Aldershot Town officially entered administration. The club fell with debts of over £1 million.

On 1 August 2013, Aldershot Town confirmed the takeover of the club by a consortium led by former chairman Shahid Azeem. In conjunction, the club announced the agreement of a lucrative deal with Chelsea to host a significant number of matches played by the Chelsea Academy and Reserves over the next two years.

Aldershot Town were relegated from the National League in 2019 after finishing 21st. However, they were reprieved from relegation after Gateshead were administratively relegated. The 2019–20 National League was suspended in March 2020 due to the COVID-19 pandemic with the Shots finishing in 18th place based on points per game. Aldershot Town finished 15th in the 2020–21 season finishing with 52 points. In the 2021–22 season they finished 20th and in the 2022–23 season they finished 18th.

On 4 November 2023, Aldershot became the first non-league side to score 7 goals against an EFL opponent in an FA Cup match, beating League Two outfit Swindon Town 4-7 in the FA Cup first round, having held a 0-7 lead after just 58 minutes. This had happened before on 18 November 1905 when Crystal Palace beat Chelsea 7-1 due to Chelsea fielding their main XI against Burnley on the same day and being forced into playing a reserve side consisting of mostly amateurs, however this took place in the third qualifying round and therefore is not considered for this record.

In 2024–25, Aldershot reached the final of the FA Trophy for the first time in their history, after defeating local rivals Woking 2–1 in the semi-finals. En route to the final, Aldershot also beat Sittingbourne, Boreham Wood, Wealdstone, as well as an 8–0 away win at Chertsey Town. In the final, Aldershot defeated Spennymoor Town 3–0 in their first visit to Wembley Stadium.

On 5 January 2026, a club statement announced that director Deane Wood had taken over the role of chairman and owner, after outgoing chairman Shahid Azeem and another director John Leppard had written off their entire loans to the club and transferred all of their shares to Wood at no cost.

== Recent seasons ==
Statistics for the previous decade. For a full history see; List of Aldershot Town F.C. seasons

Year	League	Level	Pld	W	D	L	GF	GA	GD	Pts	Position	FA Cup	League Cup	FA Trophy	Average attendance
2012–13	League Two	4	46	11	15	20	42	60	−18	48	24th of 24; Relegated	R4	R1	-	2,272
2013–14	Football Conference	5	46	16	13	17	69	62	+7	51	19th of 24 (Note: Aldershot were deducted ten points for entering administration)	QR4	-	R4	1,946
2014–15	Football Conference	5	46	14	11	21	51	61	−10	53	18th of 24	R2	-	R1	1,758
2015–16	National League	5	46	16	8	22	54	72	−18	56	15th of 24	R1	-	R1	1,509
2016–17	National League	5	46	23	13	10	66	37	+29	82	5th of 24; Lost in play-off semi-finals	QR4	-	R1	2,338
2017–18	National League	5	46	20	15	11	64	52	+12	75	5th of 24; Lost in play-off quarter-finals	R1	-	R1	2,429
2018–19	National League	5	46	11	11	24	38	67	−29	44	21st of 24	R1	-	R1	1,744
2019–20	National League	5	39	12	10	17	43	55	−12	46	18th of 24 (Note: The 2019–20 football season was disrupted by the effects of the COVID-19 pandemic. The National League was suspended in mid-March 2020 and the clubs voted six weeks later to end the regular season programme. Teams had not all played the same number of matches, so it was agreed to construct final league tables on an unweighted points per game basis. Aldershot Town were placed eighteenth.)	QR4	-	R1	1,786
2020–21	National League	5	42	15	7	20	59	66	−7	52	15th of 22 (Note: In October 2020 due to ongoing financial issues, Macclesfield Town were expelled from the National League. Furthermore, also due to financial issues inflicted by COVID-19, Dover Athletic were unable to complete their fixtures. Therefore, only 42 fixtures were played instead of the intended 46.)	QR4	-	QF	N/A (Note: Due to the ongoing disruption caused by the COVID-19 pandemic, the vast majority of fixtures were played behind closed doors.)
2021–22	National League	5	44	11	10	23	46	73	−27	43	20th of 23	QR4	-	R4	1,824
2022–23	National League	5	46	14	11	21	64	76	−12	53	18th of 24	QR4	-	QF	2,052
2023–24	National League	5	46	20	9	15	74	83	-9	69	8th of 24	R3	-	R4	2,684
2024–25	National League	5	46	14	15	17	69	83	-14	57	16th of 24	R1	-	Winners	2,413
2025–26	National League	5	46	13	7	26	69	87	-18	46	20th of 24	R1	-	R3	2,313

== Stadium ==
Aldershot Town play their home games at The Recreation Ground, which has a capacity of 7,100. The stadium was previously the home of Aldershot F.C. The stadium's current sponsor is EBB Paper, therefore the ground is advertly known as The EBB Stadium at The Recreation Ground, however is affectionately known as 'The Rec'.

In March 2018, Aldershot Town presented proposals for the redevelopment of the EBB Stadium to Rushmoor Borough Council which would see the potential development of a new stadium, containing both seating and standing areas, that will give the club a 'long-term home from which to build our ambitions on the pitch'.

== Players ==
=== Current squad ===
As of 21 November 2026

Note: Flags indicate national team as defined under FIFA eligibility rules; some limited exceptions apply. Players may hold more than one non-FIFA nationality.

No.	Pos.	Nation	Player
1	GK	ENG	Nick Hayes
2	DF	COD	Michee Efete
3	DF	ENG	Ollie Harfield
4	MF	NZL	Jacob Borgnis
5	DF	ENG	Kiki Oshilaja (captain)
6	MF	ENG	Dominic Odusanya
7	FW	ENG	Tristan Abrahams
8	MF	ENG	John Gilbert
9	FW	ENG	Marcus Dinanga
10	FW	MLT	Basil Tuma
11	FW	ENG	Hakeem Sandah
12	DF	ENG	Michael Stickland (captain)
13	GK	ENG	Charlie Patmore
14	MF	IRL	Scott Davies (player-manager)

No.	Pos.	Nation	Player
15	MF	WAL	Kwaku Frimpong
16	DF	ENG	Jack Matton (on loan from Wycombe Wanderers)
17	DF	JAM	Tyrese Dyce
18	DF	ENG	Nino Adom-Malaki
19	FW	ENG	Alfonso Tenconi
21	FW	ENG	Brody Peart
23	MF	ENG	Conor Lawless
25	MF	ENG	Jacob Chrismas (dual-registered with Kingstonian)
26	MF	WAL	Joe Lewis-Evans (dual-registered with Hartley Wintney)
27	FW	SCO	Daniel Cummings (on loan from West Ham United)
28	MF	ENG	Tyler Sackey (on loan from Reading)
29	FW	ENG	Anisius Lewis
30	DF	ENG	Josh Robinson

=== Out on loan ===
Note: Flags indicate national team as defined under FIFA eligibility rules; some limited exceptions apply. Players may hold more than one non-FIFA nationality.

No. / Pos. / Nation / Player; 20 / FW / CYP / Marcus Wyllie (at Bedford Town until 2 January 2027)	No. / Pos. / Nation / Player; 24 / DF / ENG / Elijah Oladunjoye (at Slough Town until 6 January 2027)

=== Notable players ===
For all Aldershot Town F.C. players with a Wikipedia article see Category:Aldershot Town F.C. players.

=== Players of the Season ===
Season	Player
1992–93	Mark Butler
1993–94	Keith Baker and Steve Harris
1994–95	Stuart Udal
1995–96	Danny Holmes
1996–97	Jimmy Sugrue
1997–98	Otis Hutchings
1998–99	Jason Chewins
1999–2000	Ollie Adedeji
2000–01	Mark Bentley
2001–02	Jason Chewins
2002–03	Nikki Bull
2003–04	Ray Warburton
2004–05	Steve Watson
2005–06	Nikki Bull
2006–07	John Grant
2007–08	Nikki Bull
2008–09	Anthony Charles
2009–10	Ben Herd
2010–11	Luke Guttridge
2011–12	Darren Jones
2012–13	Jamie Young
2013–14	Chris Barker
2014–15	Chris Barker
2015–16	Omar Beckles
2016–17	Jake Cole
2017–18	Emmanuel Oyeleke
2018–19	Adam McDonnell
2020–21	Josh Rees
2021–22	Mohamed Sylla
2022–23	Tyler Cordner
2023–24	Ollie Harfield
2024–25	Josh Barrett
2025–26	Ryan Hill

== Managers ==
Name	Nat	From	To	Games Managed	Games won	Games Drawn	Games lost	Win percentage	Points average
Steve Wignall	(England)	23 May 1992	12 Jan 1995	146	97	24	25	66.43%	2.16
Paul Shrubb^{(c)}	(England)	13 Jan 1995	25 Jan 1995	1	1	0	0	100.00%	3.00
Steve Wigley	(England)	26 Jan 1995	30 Jul 1997	135	72	25	38	53.33%	1.79
Andy Meyer^{(c)}, Mark Butler^{(c)} & Joe Roach^{(c)}	(England)	1 Aug 1997	17 Sep 1997	8	3	2	3	37.50%	1.38
George Borg	(England)	18 Sep 1997	31 Jan 2002	261	147	50	64	56.32%	1.88
Stuart Cash^{(c)}	(England)	1 Feb 2002	19 Mar 2002	12	7	2	3	58.33%	1.92
Terry Brown	(England)	20 Mar 2002	27 Mar 2007	284	145	52	87	51.05%	1.71
Martin Kuhl^{(c)}	(England)	28 Mar 2007	16 May 2007	11	5	3	3	45.45%	1.64
Gary Waddock	(Republic of Ireland)	17 May 2007	13 Oct 2009	128	64	27	37	50.00%	1.71
Jason Dodd^{(c)}	(England)	14 Oct 2009	8 Nov 2009	4	1	1	2	25.00%	1.00
Kevin Dillon	(England)	9 Nov 2009	10 Jan 2011	63	22	17	24	34.92%	1.32
Dean Holdsworth	(England)	11 Jan 2011	20 Feb 2013	118	42	35	42	35.59%	1.36
Andy Scott	(England)	22 Feb 2013	21 Jan 2015	103	33	28	42	32.04%	1.23
Chris Barker^{(c)}	(England)	22 Jan 2015	26 Apr 2015	15	5	5	5	33.33%	1.33
Barry Smith	(Scotland)	27 Apr 2015	30 Apr 2016	50	17	9	24	34.00%	1.20
Gary Waddock	(Republic of Ireland)	5 May 2016	2 May 2019	121	52	33	36	42.98%	1.56
Danny Searle	(England)	20 May 2019	20 Sep 2021	88	28	18	42	31.8%	1.16
Mark Molesley	(England)	20 Sep 2021	15 Oct 2022	55	14	11	30	25.5%	0.963
Ross McNeilly	(England)	17 Oct 2022	2 Apr 2023	26	9	5	13	34.61%	1.20
Tommy Widdrington	(England)	2 Apr 2023	14 Oct 2025	133	53	33	47	39.85%	1.20
Alan Dowson^{(c)}	(England)	14 Oct 2025	24 Oct 2025	2	0	0	2	0.00%	0.00
John Coleman	(England)	24 Oct 2025	25 Apr 2026	35	11	3	21	31.4%	1.03
Scott Davies	(Republic of Ireland)	27 Apr 2026	Present	0	0	0	0	0.00%	0.00

- ^{(c)} = Caretaker managers
- Updated 5 May 2026

== Records and statistics ==
=== Appearances and goals ===
Jason Chewins holds the record for the most number of appearances for the club, playing 489 times between August 1994 and May 2004. This led to the left-back being the first and, to date, only player to receive a testimonial match, which was played against Portsmouth in July 2004.

Before Chewins, the record was held by Mark Butler, who joined the club at its inception in 1992. Butler played 303 times between August 1992 and May 1998, also holding the all-time goal scoring record by netting 155 times, a record he still currently holds. Former goalkeeper Nikki Bull made his 300th appearance for the Shots in November 2008 and eventually made 313 appearances before moving to Brentford in July 2009. Five others have played more than 200 times for the club, including Stuart Udal, whose cousin Shaun was an England international cricketer. Winger Jimmy Sugrue has also reached the landmark. More recently, three members of the 2007–08 title winning squad, namely Anthony Charles, Anthony Straker and Danny Hylton reached the landmark.

Gary Abbott is, apart from Butler, the only Shots player to have ever scored over 100 goals for the club. Over the course of three seasons, between August 1998 and May 2001, he scored 120 goals.

=== Most appearances ===
As of 6 May 2017

#	Player	Career	Appearances
1	(England) Jason Chewins	1994–2004	489
2	(England) Nikki Bull	2002–2009	313
3	(England) Mark Butler	1992–1998	303
4	(Grenada) Anthony Straker	2007–2012 & 2016–2017	266
5	(England) Stuart Udal	1992–1997	236
6	(England) Anthony Charles	2002–2003 & 2006–2011	229
7	(England) Danny Hylton	2005–2013	226
8	(England) Jimmy Sugrue	1994–1996, 1996–2000 & 2001–2002	200
9	(England) Danny Holmes	1993–1998	194
10	(England) Ben Herd	2009–2013	191

=== Most goals ===
#	Player	Career	Goals
1	(England) Mark Butler	1992–1998	155
2	(England) Gary Abbott	1998–2001	120
3	(England) Steve Stairs	1992–1995	75
3	(England) Roy Young	1994–1999	75
5	(England) John Grant	2006–2010	57
6	(England) Stafford Browne	2000–2002 & 2002–2003	53
6	(England) Danny Hylton	2005–2013	53
8	(England) Tim Sills	2003–2006 & 2010–2011	52
9	(England) Roscoe D'Sane	2002–2005	48
10	(England) Kirk Hudson	2005–2010	45

- Up to and including, Hereford United (h), 26 April 2014.

=== Transfers ===
Record Purchase

- Marvin Morgan from Woking for an undisclosed fee (but a club record) in May 2008. The previous highest fee paid for a player was the £20,000 paid to Woking for Grant Payne in November 1999.

Record Sale

- Josh Stokes to Bristol City for an undisclosed club record fee in January 2024, thought to be in the region of £250,000 excluding add-ons.

==== Best performances ====
- FA Cup
  - Fourth round, 2012–13
- EFL Cup
  - Fourth round, 2011–12
- EFL Trophy
  - Second round, 2009–10, 2010–11
- FA Trophy
  - Winners, 2024–25
- Conference League Cup
  - Winners, 2007–08
- FA Vase
  - Quarter-finalists, 1993–94
- Isthmian League Cup
  - Winners, 1998–99
- Hampshire Senior Cup
  - Winners, 1998–99, 1999–2000, 2001–02, 2002–03, 2006–07

== Kits ==
Aldershot Town's home kit is red with blue and white trim. The club have always played in a predominantly red kit with blue features, including stripes and quarters. The club's chosen colours of red and blue reflect the garrison town's association with the British Army.

=== Kit supplier ===
Errea were the kit supplier for the 2011–12 season. Adidas was the kit supplier from the 2013–14 season to the 2019–20 season. Errea has been the kit supplier from the 2020–21 season.

=== Kit manufacturers and sponsors ===
Period	Kit manufacturer	Shirt sponsor
1992–1993	Ribero	Pam's Florist
1993–1997	Fiva	Datrontech
1997–1998	ICIS	Datrontech
1998–2002	ICIS	Charters Peugeot
2002–2004	ICIS	Hi-Speed
2004–2006	Errea	Charters Peugeot
2006–2007	Errea	EBB Paper
2007–2008	Errea	ezylet.co.uk
2008–2010	Carbrini Sportswear	EBB Paper
2010–2011	Carbrini Sportswear	Xfor Security
2011–2013	Errea	EBB Paper
2013–2020	Adidas	Bridges Estate Agents
2020–	Errea	Bridges Estate Agents

=== Previous kits ===
Further details and images of previous kits can be found at the Historical Football Kit website.

== Rivalries ==
Aldershot Town's local rivals are Rushmoor neighbours Farnborough and Surrey side Woking. Fixtures against these sides attract larger than average crowds, including 5,961 for a Hampshire Senior Cup semi-final, a league record 5,518 in an Isthmian League Premier Division match against Farnborough and 6,870 for an FA Cup first round match against Woking. The Hampshire Chronicle has reported on Aldershot Town's rivalry with Woking as the "feistiest derby in English football".

Aldershot’s main rivals considered by supporters are Reading which is a rivalry carried on from the previous club. Games are rare between the two because of the difference in league status. The last meeting was a friendly in 2001 that resulted in multiple arrests.

Aldershot also has a friendly relationship and close ties with "sister club" Badshot Lea. The two annually hold pre-season fixtures against each other.

== Honours ==
League

- Conference (level 5)
  - Champions: 2007–08
- Isthmian League (level 6)
  - Champions: 2002–03
- Isthmian League Division One (level 7)
  - Champions: 1997–98
- Isthmian League Division Three (level 9)
  - Champions: 1992–93

Cup

- FA Trophy
  - Winners: 2024–25
- Conference League Cup
  - Winners: 2007–08
- Hampshire Senior Cup
  - Winners: 1998–99, 1999–2000, 2001–02, 2002–03, 2006–07
