= 2012–13 Barnet F.C. season =

Barnet F.C.
2012–13 season
- Chairman: Anthony Kleanthous
- Manager: Edgar Davids
- League Two: 23rd (relegated)
- FA Cup: 1st round
- League Cup: 1st round
- Football League Trophy: 2nd round
- Top goalscorer: League: Jake Hyde (14); All: Jake Hyde (14)
- Highest home attendance: League: 6,001 vs Wycombe Wanderers (20 Apr 2013); All: 6,001 vs Wycombe Wanderers (20 Apr 2013)
- Lowest home attendance: League: 1,483 vs Exeter City (2 Oct 2012); All: 1,483 vs Exeter City (2 Oct 2012)
| Home colours | Away colours |

Barnet began the season with a new manager after Lawrie Sanchez was sacked towards the end of the 2011/12 season and subsequent caretaker manager Martin Allen was not asked to continue. The new manager was Mark Robson, who was appointed on 10 June 2012. However, after failing to win any of his first 13 games, Edgar Davids was brought in to partner Robson as well as taking up playing duties. Robson departed the club on 28 December 2012, leaving Davids in sole charge. Barnet were relegated on the last day of the season, finishing 23rd with 51 points.

== League table ==
| Pos | Team | Pld | W | D | L | GF | GA | GD | Pts | Promotion, qualification or relegation |
|---|---|---|---|---|---|---|---|---|---|---|
| 20 | AFC Wimbledon | 46 | 14 | 11 | 21 | 54 | 76 | −22 | 53 | |
| 21 | Plymouth Argyle | 46 | 13 | 13 | 20 | 46 | 55 | −9 | 52 | |
| 22 | Dagenham & Redbridge | 46 | 13 | 12 | 21 | 55 | 62 | −7 | 51 | |
| 23 | Barnet (R) | 46 | 13 | 12 | 21 | 47 | 59 | −12 | 51 | Relegation to the Conference Premier |
| 24 | Aldershot Town (R) | 46 | 11 | 15 | 20 | 42 | 60 | −18 | 48 | Relegation to the Conference Premier |

Updated to match(es) played on 27 April 2013. Source: BBC Sport
Rules for classification: 1) Points; 2) Goal difference; 3) Number of goals scored
(R) Relegated

== Results ==
=== Pre-season friendlies ===
| 14 July 2012 | Burnham Ramblers | 0–6 | Barnet | Leslie Fields, Burnham-on-Crouch |
| 15:00 | | | Hyde (2); Lee (2); Ademeno; Vilhete |

| 21 July 2012 | St Albans City | 2–10 | Barnet | Clarence Park, St Albans |
| 15:00 | Fagan; Spendlove | | Byrne; Vilhete; Holmes; Nurse (2); Lee; Yiadom; Edgar (2); Bakare | Attendance: 404 |

| 26 July 2012 | Barnet | 1–4 | Charlton Athletic | Underhill Stadium, Barnet |
| 19:45 | Nurse 41' | | Wright-Phillips 4'; Kermorgant 28', 62'; Jackson 36' | Attendance: 856; Referee: M. Russell |

| 4 August 2012 | Boreham Wood | 2–3 | Barnet | Meadow Park, Borehamwood |
| 15:00 | O'Loughlin; Effiong | | Kamdjo; Yiadom (2) |

=== League Two ===
| 18 August 2012 | Port Vale | 3–0 | Barnet | Vale Park, Stoke-on-Trent |
| 15:00 | Dodds 8'; Myrie-Williams 20' (pen.); Pope 75' | Report | | Attendance: 4,608; Referee: Scott Duncan |

| 21 August 2012 | Barnet | 1–1 | Bristol Rovers | Underhill Stadium, Barnet |
| 20:00 | Holmes 9' | Report | Harrold 55' | Attendance: 1,794; Referee: Steve Bratt |

| 25 August 2012 | Barnet | 1–3 | York City | Underhill Stadium, Barnet |
| 15:00 | Nurse 30' | Report | Parslow 55'; Chambers 16'; Coulson 45' | Attendance: 1,889; Referee: Andy D'Urso |

| 1 September 2012 | Rochdale | 2–0 | Barnet | Spotland Stadium, Rochdale |
| 15:00 | Grimes 17'; Adebola 34' | Report | | Attendance: 2,021; Referee: David Webb |

| 8 September 2012 | Barnet | 1–3 | Gillingham | Underhill Stadium, London |
| 15:00 | Saville 23' | Report | Payne 10'; Kedwell 11'; Burton 39' | Attendance: 2,835; Referee: Graham Scott |

| 15 September 2012 | Bradford City | 3–0 | Barnet | Valley Parade, Bradford |
| 15:00 | Hanson 27'; Connell 55'; Davies 57' | Report | | Attendance: 9,566; Referee: Rob Lewis |

| 15 September 2012 | Aldershot Town | 1–0 | Barnet | The Recreation Ground, Aldershot |
| 15:00 | Reid 68' | Report | | Attendance: 1,760; Referee: Gavin Ward |

| 22 September 2012 | Barnet | 0–0 | Rotherham United | Underhill Stadium, Barnet |
| 15:00 | | Report | Revell (red card) | Attendance: 1,821; Referee: Dean Whitestone |

| 29 September 2012 | Fleetwood Town | 2–1 | Barnet | Highbury Stadium, Fleetwood |
| 15:00 | Ball 26' (pen.); Barkhuizen 78' | Report | 5' Hyde; (red card) 23' Stack | Attendance: 3,615; Referee: Richard Clark |

| 2 October 2012 | Barnet | 1–2 | Exeter City | Underhill Stadium, Barnet |
| 20:00 | Hyde 81' | Report | Cureton 35' 67' | Attendance: 1,483; Referee: David Phillips |

| 6 October 2012 | Southend United | 2–2 | Barnet | Roots Hall, Southend-on-Sea |
| 15:00 | Eastwood 67' (pen.); Hurst 84' | Report | Holmes 54'; Hyde 65' | Attendance: 5,025; Referee: Brendan Malone |

| 13 October 2012 | Barnet | 1–4 | Plymouth Argyle | Underhill Stadium, Barnet |
| 15:00 | Stephens 16' | Report | R. Griffiths 2' (pen.); Blanchard 11'; Cowan-Hall 62'; Young 90' | Attendance: 3,229; Referee: Fred Graham |

| 19 October 2012 | Barnet | 4–0 | Northampton Town | Underhill Stadium, Barnet |
| 20:00 | Pearce 56'; Yiadom 65'; Oster 90'; Edgar 90' | Report | | Attendance: 2,721; Referee: Darren Sheldrake |

| 23 October 2012 | Wycombe Wanderers | 0–0 | Barnet | Adams Park, High Wycombe |
| 20:00 | | Report | | Attendance: 3,244; Referee: Iain Williamson |

| 27 October 2012 | Chesterfield | 0–1 | Barnet | Proact Stadium, Chesterfield |
| 15:00 | | Report | Byrne 90' (pen.) | Attendance: 5,611; Referee: Andy Davies |

| 6 November 2012 | Barnet | 1–0 | Torquay United | Underhill Stadium, Barnet |
| 20:00 | Kamdjo 79' | Report | | Attendance: 1,544; Referee: Darren Deadman |

| 10 November 2012 | Morecambe | 4–1 | Barnet | Globe Arena, Morecambe |
| 15:00 | Ellison 6'; Fleming 10'; Brodie 81' (pen.) 86' (pen.) | Report | Nurse 90' | Attendance: 1,653; Referee: Steve Rushton |

| 16 November 2012 | Barnet | 1–1 | Accrington Stanley | Underhill Stadium, Barnet |
| 20:00 | Byrne 71' (pen.); (red card) 85' Davids | Report | Boco 53' | Attendance: 2,238; Referee: Lee Collins |

| 20 November 2012 | Barnet | 2–2 | Oxford United | Underhill Stadium, Barnet |
| 20:00 | Hyde 5' 70' | Report | Rigg 6'; Whing 46' | Attendance: 1,626; Referee: Mark Haywood |

| 24 November 2012 | Cheltenham Town | 1–0 | Barnet | Whaddon Road, Cheltenham |
| 15:00 | Goulding 80' | Report | | Attendance: 2,591; Referee: Bobby Madley |

| 8 December 2012 | Barnet | 1–1 | AFC Wimbledon | Underhill Stadium, Barnet |
| 15:00 | Hyde 64' | Report | Long 84' | Attendance: 3,217; Referee: Stuart Attwell |

| 15 December 2012 | Dagenham & Redbridge | 1–0 | Barnet | Victoria Road, Dagenham |
| 15:00 | Saunders 17' | Report | | Attendance: 2,020; Referee: Mark Brown |

| 21 December 2012 | Barnet | 3–2 | Burton Albion | Underhill Stadium, Barnet |
| 20:00 | Holmes 42' 53' (pen.) 66' | Report | Kee 16' (pen.); Maghoma 90' (pen.) | Attendance: 1,751; Referee: Andy Davies |

| 26 December 2012 | Gillingham | 0–1 | Barnet | Priestfield Stadium, Gillingham |
| 13:00 | | Report | Hyde 19' | Attendance: 7,448; Referee: Tim Robinson |

| 29 December 2012 | Exeter City | 2–2 | Barnet | St James Park, Exeter |
| 15:00 | Coles 34'; Bennett 45' | Report | Nurse 76'; Iro 90' | Attendance: 4,085; Referee: Chris Sarginson |

| 1 January 2013 | Barnet | 0–1 | Aldershot Town | Underhill Stadium, Barnet |
| 15:00 | (red card) 50' Nurse | Report | Reid 48' (pen.) | Attendance: 2,772; Referee: Carl Berry |

| 5 January 2013 | Barnet | 2–0 | Bradford City | Underhill Stadium, Barnet |
| 15:00 | Atieno 41'; Oster 48' | Report | | Attendance: 2,317; Referee: Mark Heywood |

| 12 January 2013 | Rotherham United | 0–2 | Barnet | New York Stadium, Rotherham |
| 15:00 | | Report | Hyde 21'; Yiadom 82' | Attendance: 7,434; Referee: Andy D'Urso |

| 26 January 2013 | Burton Albion | 1–0 | Barnet | Pirelli Stadium, Burton upon Trent |
| 15:00 | Maghoma 4' (pen.) | Report | | Attendance: 2,050; Referee: Oliver Langford |

| 1 February 2013 | Bristol Rovers | 2–1 | Barnet | Memorial Stadium, Bristol |
| 19:45 | Broghammer 78'; Brunt 90' | Report | Crawford 90' | Attendance: 8,527; Referee: Trevor Kettle |

| 9 February 2013 | Barnet | 0–0 | Port Vale | Underhill Stadium, Barnet |
| 15:00 | | Report | | Attendance: 2,398; Referee: Graham Salisbury |

| 16 February 2013 | York City | 1–2 | Barnet | Bootham Crescent, York |
| 15:00 | Rankine 7' | Report | Yiadom 25'; Hyde 73' | Attendance: 3,594; Referee: David Coote |

| 23 February 2013 | Barnet | 0–0 | Rochdale | Underhill Stadium, Barnet |
| 15:00 | | Report | | Attendance: 1,870; Referee: Brendan Malone |

| 26 February 2013 | Barnet | 2–0 | Southend United | Underhill Stadium, Barnet |
| 20:00 | Hyde 33'; Davids 84' | Report | | Attendance: 2,211; Referee: Carl Berry |

| 2 March 2013 | Plymouth Argyle | 2–1 | Barnet | Home Park, Plymouth |
| 15:00 | Hourihane 36'; Murray 49' | Report | Hyde 21' | Attendance: 8,210; Referee: Dean Whitestone |

| 9 March 2013 | Barnet | 4–1 | Morecambe | Underhill Stadium, Barnet |
| 15:00 | Gambin 52'; López 65' 70' (pen.) 87' | Report | Redshaw 33'; Roche (red card) 69' | Attendance: 2,012; Referee: James Adcock |

| 12 March 2013 | Oxford United | 1–0 | Barnet | Kassam Stadium, Oxford |
| 19:45 | Raynes 90' | Report | | Attendance: 5,027; Referee: Phil Gibbs |

| 16 March 2013 | Accrington Stanley | 3–2 | Barnet | Crown Ground, Accrington |
| 15:00 | Molyneux 8' 25' 34' (pen.) | Report | Johnson 45'; Jenkins 63'; Davids (red card) 86' | Attendance: 1,559; Referee: Mark Heywood |

| 19 March 2013 | Barnet | 2–0 | Fleetwood Town | Underhill Stadium, Barnet |
| 20:00 | Byrne 23'; Gambin 60' | Report | | Attendance: 1,731; Referee: Simon Hooper |

| 23 March 2013 | Barnet | 0–0 | Cheltenham Town | Underhill Stadium, Barnet |
| 15:00 | | Report | | Attendance: 2,400; Referee: Darren Drysdale |

| 29 March 2013 | Barnet | 0–0 | Dagenham & Redbridge | Underhill Stadium, Barnet |
| 15:00 | De Silva (red card) 88'; Fuller (red card) after match' | Report | | Attendance: 3,680; Referee: Keith Hill |

| 1 April 2013 | AFC Wimbledon | 0–1 | Barnet | Kingsmeadow, Norbiton |
| 15:00 | | Report | Marsh-Brown 85' | Attendance: 4,696; Referee: Anthony Bates |

| 6 April 2013 | Barnet | 0–2 | Chesterfield | Underhill Stadium, Barnet |
| 15:00 | | Report | O'Shea 57'; Togwell 78' | Attendance: 2,574; Referee: Stephen Martin |

| 16 April 2013 | Torquay United | 3–2 | Barnet | Plainmoor, Torquay |
| 19:45 | Benyon 25'; Bodin 60'; Saah 71' | Report | Hyde 58' 77' | Attendance: 2,722; Referee: Andy Woolmer |

| 20 April 2013 | Barnet | 1–0 | Wycombe Wanderers | Underhill Stadium, Barnet |
| 15:15 | Hyde 81' | Report | | Attendance: 6,001; Referee: Chris Sarginson |

| 27 April 2013 | Northampton Town | 2–0 | Barnet | Sixfields Stadium, Northampton |
| 15:00 | O'Donovan 67'; Guttridge 73' | Report | | Attendance: 7,471; Referee: Andy Haines |

=== FA Cup ===
| 3 November 2012 1st Round | Barnet | 0–2 | Oxford United | Underhill Stadium, Barnet |
| 15:00 | | Report | Constable 56'; Rigg 80' | Attendance: 2,346; Referee: Tim Robinson |

=== League Cup ===
| 14 August 2012 1st Round | Birmingham City | 5–1 | Barnet | St Andrew's, Birmingham |
| 19:45 BST | King 38' (pen.); Caldwell 49'; Ambrose 54'; Løvenkrands 90+1'; Elliott 90+4' | Report | Nurse 31' | Attendance: 9,905; Referee: Lee Collins |

=== Football League Trophy ===
| 9 October 2012 2nd Round | Leyton Orient | 1–0 | Barnet | Brisbane Road, Leyton |
| 19:00 | Odubajo 25' | Report | | Attendance: 1,404; Referee: Roger East |

=== Herts Senior Cup ===
| 7 November 2012 1st Round | Tring Athletic | 1–6 | Barnet | The Grass Roots Stadium, Tring |
| 19:45 | Thomas 73' | Report | Lowe 21' 85'; Allen 24' 32'; Nurse 36'; Abdulla 59' | Attendance: 143 |

| 19 December 2012 2nd Round | Ware | 2–1 | Barnet | Wodson Park, Ware |
| 19:45 | Knight 4'; Stevenson 47' | Report | Allen 46' |

== Squad statistics ==
=== Appearances and goals ===
As of 27 April 2013

| Number | Position | Nationality | Name | League | | FA Cup | | League Cup | | JP Trophy | | Total | |
| Number | Position | Nationality | Name | Apps. | Goals | Apps. | Goals | Apps. | Goals | Apps. | Goals | Apps. | Goals |
|---|---|---|---|---|---|---|---|---|---|---|---|---|---|
| 1 | GK | ENG | Liam O'Brien | 3 | 0 | 0 | 0 | 1 | 0 | 0 | 0 | 4 | 0 |
| 2 | DF | ENG | Barry Fuller | 39 | 0 | 1 | 0 | 0 | 0 | 1 | 0 | 41 | 0 |
| 3 | DF | ENG | Jordan Brown | 21 | 0 | 1 | 0 | 1 | 0 | 1 | 0 | 24 | 0 |
| 4 | MF | CMR | Clovis Kamdjo | 21 (5) | 1 | 1 | 0 | 1 | 0 | 1 | 0 | 24 (5) | 1 |
| 6 | DF | ENG | Jack Saville | 4 (2) | 1 | 0 | 0 | 0 (1) | 0 | 0 (1) | 0 | 4 (4) | 1 |
| 7 | MF | ENG | Olly Lee (on loan at Birmingham City) | 6 (5) | 0 | 1 | 0 | 1 | 0 | 0 | 0 | 8 (5) | 0 |
| 8 | MF | IRE | Mark Byrne | 36 (4) | 3 | 1 | 0 | 0 | 0 | 1 | 0 | 38 (4) | 3 |
| 10 | FW | BAR | Jon Nurse | 18 (8) | 3 | 0 | 0 | 1 | 1 | 0 (1) | 0 | 19 (9) | 4 |
| 11 | FW | ENG | Ricky Holmes | 25 | 5 | 0 | 0 | 1 | 0 | 1 | 0 | 27 | 5 |
| 12 | MF | ENG | Luke Gambin | 5 (5) | 2 | 0 | 0 | 0 | 0 | 0 | 0 | 5 (5) | 2 |
| 14 | MF | KSA | Ahmed Abdulla | 4 (2) | 0 | 0 | 0 | 1 | 0 | 0 | 0 | 5 (2) | 0 |
| 15 | MF | ENG | Andy Yiadom | 31 (8) | 3 | 1 | 0 | 1 | 0 | 1 | 0 | 34 (8) | 3 |
| 16 | MF | ENG | Freddie Warren (on loan at Hastings United) | 1 (1) | 0 | 0 | 0 | 1 | 0 | 0 | 0 | 2 (1) | 0 |
| 18 | GK | ENG | Sam Cowler | 1 (1) | 0 | 1 | 0 | 0 | 0 | 0 | 0 | 2 (1) | 0 |
| 19 | FW | ENG | Jake Hyde | 31 (9) | 14 | 0 | 0 | 0 (1) | 0 | 1 | 0 | 32 (10) | 14 |
| 20 | MF | ENG | Curtis Weston | 19 (10) | 0 | 1 | 0 | 0 (1) | 0 | 0 | 0 | 20 (11) | 0 |
| 21 | FW | SCO | George Sykes | 0 (3) | 0 | 0 | 0 | 0 | 0 | 0 | 0 | 0 (3) | 0 |
| 22 | MF | ENG | Iffy Allen | 0 (2) | 0 | 0 (1) | 0 | 0 | 0 | 0 | 0 | 0 (3) | 0 |
| 23 | DF | KEN | Kamal Guthmy | 0 | 0 | 0 | 0 | 0 | 0 | 0 | 0 | 0 | 0 |
| 24 | DF | ENG | Jamal Hackett | 0 | 0 | 0 | 0 | 0 | 0 | 0 | 0 | 0 | 0 |
| 25 | FW | ENG | Jamal Lowe | 3 (5) | 0 | 0 (1) | 0 | 0 | 0 | 1 | 0 | 4 (6) | 0 |
| 26 | DF | ENG | Elliot Johnson | 25 (1) | 1 | 0 | 0 | 0 | 0 | 0 | 0 | 25 (1) | 1 |
| 27 | MF | POR | Mauro Vilhete | 4 (1) | 0 | 0 | 0 | 0 | 0 | 0 | 0 | 4 (1) | 0 |
| 29 | GK | IRE | Graham Stack | 42 | 0 | 0 | 0 | 0 | 0 | 1 | 0 | 43 | 0 |
| 30 | DF | WAL | David Stephens | 42 | 1 | 1 | 0 | 0 | 0 | 1 | 0 | 44 | 1 |
| 31 | MF | WAL | John Oster | 23 (5) | 2 | 0 | 0 | 0 | 0 | 0 | 0 | 23 (5) | 2 |
| 33 | FW | SLE | Ishmail Kamara | 0 (1) | 0 | 0 | 0 | 0 | 0 | 0 | 0 | 0 (1) | 0 |
| 34 | DF | COD | Chiró N'Toko | 2 | 0 | 0 | 0 | 0 | 0 | 0 | 0 | 2 | 0 |
| 35 | GK | ENG | Dillon Barnes | 0 | 0 | 0 | 0 | 0 | 0 | 0 | 0 | 0 | 0 |
| 38 | MF | NED | Edgar Davids | 28 | 1 | 0 (1) | 0 | 0 | 0 | 0 | 0 | 28 (1) | 1 |
| 40 | DF | NIR | Tom Flanagan (on loan from Milton Keynes Dons) | 8 (1) | 0 | 0 | 0 | 0 | 0 | 0 | 0 | 8 (1) | 0 |
| 42 | FW | IRE | Harry Crawford | 3 (7) | 1 | 0 | 0 | 0 | 0 | 0 | 0 | 3 (7) | 1 |
| 43 | MF | ENG | Dominic Vose | 0 (2) | 0 | 0 | 0 | 0 | 0 | 0 | 0 | 0 (2) | 0 |
| 44 | FW | SCO | Craig Beattie | 1 (4) | 0 | 0 | 0 | 0 | 0 | 0 | 0 | 1 (4) | 0 |
| 47 | MF | ENG | Kyle De Silva (on loan from Crystal Palace) | 1 (2) | 0 | 0 | 0 | 0 | 0 | 0 | 0 | 1 (2) | 0 |
| 48 | GK | NED | Michel Kuipers | 0 | 0 | 0 | 0 | 0 | 0 | 0 | 0 | 0 | 0 |
| 49 | MF | ENG | Keanu Marsh-Brown | 3 (2) | 1 | 0 | 0 | 0 | 0 | 0 | 0 | 3 (2) | 1 |
Players who have left the club:
| 5 | DF | ENG | Jonathan Fortune | 4 (2) | 0 | 1 | 0 | 1 | 0 | 0 | 0 | 6 (2) | 0 |
| 9 | FW | ENG | Steve Kabba | 0 | 0 | 0 | 0 | 0 | 0 | 0 | 0 | 0 | 0 |
| 17 | MF | ENG | Anthony Edgar | 7 (4) | 1 | 0 | 0 | 1 | 0 | 0 (1) | 0 | 8 (5) | 1 |
| 32 | DF | ENG | Krystian Pearce (on loan from Notts County) | 17 | 1 | 0 | 0 | 0 | 0 | 1 | 0 | 18 | 1 |
| 34 | FW | ENG | George Barker (on loan from Brighton & Hove Albion) | 1 | 0 | 0 | 0 | 0 | 0 | 0 | 0 | 1 | 0 |
| 35 | DF | ENG | Andy Iro (on loan from Stevenage) | 9 | 1 | 0 | 0 | 0 | 0 | 0 | 0 | 9 | 1 |
| 36 | FW | NED | Collins John | 1 | 0 | 1 | 0 | 0 | 0 | 0 | 0 | 2 | 0 |
| 37 | FW | NED | Melvin Holwijn | 0 (1) | 0 | 0 | 0 | 0 | 0 | 0 | 0 | 0 (1) | 0 |
| 39 | FW | KEN | Taiwo Atieno | 1 (3) | 1 | 0 | 0 | 0 | 0 | 0 | 0 | 1 (3) | 1 |
| 40 | DF | NIR | Adam Thompson (on loan from Watford) | 0 (1) | 0 | 0 | 0 | 0 | 0 | 0 | 0 | 0 (1) | 0 |
| 40 | FW | ESP | Dani López (on loan from Stevenage) | 5 | 3 | 0 | 0 | 0 | 0 | 0 | 0 | 5 | 3 |
| 41 | FW | ENG | Ibra Sekajja (on loan from Crystal Palace) | 3 (1) | 0 | 0 | 0 | 0 | 0 | 0 | 0 | 3 (1) | 0 |
| 45 | DF | ENG | Bondz N'Gala (on loan from Stevenage) | 5 (1) | 0 | 0 | 0 | 0 | 0 | 0 | 0 | 5 (1) | 0 |
| 46 | MF | ENG | Ross Jenkins (on loan from Watford) | 3 (2) | 1 | 0 | 0 | 0 | 0 | 0 | 0 | 3 (2) | 1 |

=== Top scorers ===
| Place | Position | Nation | Number | Name | League Two | FA Cup | League Cup | JP Trophy | Total |
|---|---|---|---|---|---|---|---|---|---|
| 1 | FW | (England) | 19 | Jake Hyde | 14 | 0 | 0 | 0 | 14 |
| 2 | FW | (England) | 11 | Ricky Holmes | 5 | 0 | 0 | 0 | 5 |
| 3 | FW | (Barbados) | 10 | Jon Nurse | 3 | 0 | 1 | 0 | 4 |
| 4= | MF | (England) | 15 | Andy Yiadom | 3 | 0 | 0 | 0 | 3 |
| 4= | FW | (Spain) | 40 | Dani López | 3 | 0 | 0 | 0 | 3 |
| 4= | MF | (Republic of Ireland) | 8 | Mark Byrne | 3 | 0 | 0 | 0 | 3 |
| 7= | MF | (Wales) | 31 | John Oster | 2 | 0 | 0 | 0 | 2 |
| 7= | MF | (England) | 12 | Luke Gambin | 2 | 0 | 0 | 0 | 2 |
| 9= | DF | (England) | 6 | Jack Saville | 1 | 0 | 0 | 0 | 1 |
| 9= | DF | (Wales) | 30 | David Stephens | 1 | 0 | 0 | 0 | 1 |
| 9= | DF | (England) | 32 | Krystian Pearce | 1 | 0 | 0 | 0 | 1 |
| 9= | MF | (England) | 17 | Anthony Edgar | 1 | 0 | 0 | 0 | 1 |
| 9= | MF | (Cameroon) | 4 | Clovis Kamdjo | 1 | 0 | 0 | 0 | 1 |
| 9= | DF | (England) | 35 | Andy Iro | 1 | 0 | 0 | 0 | 1 |
| 9= | FW | (Kenya) | 39 | Taiwo Atieno | 1 | 0 | 0 | 0 | 1 |
| 9= | FW | (Republic of Ireland) | 42 | Harry Crawford | 1 | 0 | 0 | 0 | 1 |
| 9= | MF | (Netherlands) | 38 | Edgar Davids | 1 | 0 | 0 | 0 | 1 |
| 9= | DF | (England) | 26 | Elliot Johnson | 1 | 0 | 0 | 0 | 1 |
| 9= | MF | (England) | 46 | Ross Jenkins | 1 | 0 | 0 | 0 | 1 |
| 9= | MF | (England) | 49 | Keanu Marsh-Brown | 1 | 0 | 0 | 0 | 1 |
| | | | | Totals | 47 | 0 | 1 | 0 | 48 |

== Transfers ==
=== Players Transferred In ===
| Date | Pos. | Name | From | Fee | Ref. |
|---|---|---|---|---|---|
| 3 July 2012 | MF | (England) Olly Lee | (England) West Ham United | Free | |
| 4 July 2012 | GK | (England) Sam Cowler | (England) West Ham United | Free | |
| 5 July 2012 | DF | (England) Jordan Brown | (England) Crewe Alexandra | Free | |
| 9 July 2012 | MF | (England) Freddie Warren | (England) Charlton Athletic | Free | |
| 9 July 2012 | MF | (Saudi Arabia) Ahmed Abdulla | (England) Dagenham & Redbridge | Free | |
| 19 July 2012 | FW | (Barbados) Jon Nurse | (England) Dagenham & Redbridge | Free | |
| 25 July 2012 | MF | (England) Anthony Edgar | (England) Yeovil Town | Free | |
| 26 July 2012 | DF | (England) Jonathan Fortune | (England) Exeter City | Free | |
| 27 July 2012 | FW | (England) Jake Hyde | (Scotland) Dundee | Free | |
| 13 August 2012 | DF | (England) Barry Fuller | (England) Gillingham | Free | |
| 13 August 2012 | MF | (England) Curtis Weston | (England) Gillingham | Free | |
| 23 August 2012 | GK | (Republic of Ireland) Graham Stack | (Scotland) Hibernian | Free | |
| 31 August 2012 | DF | (Wales) David Stephens | (Scotland) Hibernian | Free | |
| 7 September 2012 | MF | (Wales) John Oster | (England) Doncaster Rovers | Free | |
| 22 September 2012 | FW | (Netherlands) Collins John | (Iran) Mes Sarcheshmeh | Free | |
| 28 September 2012 | FW | (Sierra Leone) Ishmail Kamara | (England) Dulwich Hamlet | Free | |
| 11 October 2012 | MF | (Netherlands) Edgar Davids | Unattached | Free | |
| 22 November 2012 | FW | (Netherlands) Melvin Holwijn | (Netherlands) Blauw-Wit Amsterdam | Free | |
| 26 December 2012 | FW | (Kenya) Taiwo Atieno | (England) Torquay United | Free | |
| 24 January 2013 | FW | (Republic of Ireland) Harry Crawford | (England) Dartford | Free | |
| 1 February 2013 | MF | (England) Dominic Vose | (England) Tooting & Mitcham United | Free | |
| 10 February 2013 | FW | (Scotland) Craig Beattie | (Scotland) St Johnstone | Free | |
| 15 February 2013 | DF | (Democratic Republic of the Congo) Chiró N'Toko | (Netherlands) ADO Den Haag | Free | |
| 28 March 2013 | MF | (England) Keanu Marsh-Brown | (England) Yeovil Town | Free | |
| 28 March 2013 | GK | (Netherlands) Michel Kuipers | (England) Crawley Town | Free | |

=== Players Transferred Out ===
| Date | Pos. | Name | To | Fee | Ref. |
|---|---|---|---|---|---|
| 21 May 2012 | GK | (England) Dean Brill | Free agent (Later signed for (England) Luton Town) | End of Contract | |
| 21 May 2012 | DF | (Republic of Ireland) Darren Dennehy | Free Agent (Later signed for (Republic of Ireland) Cork City) | End of Contract | |
| 21 May 2012 | DF | (England) Jordan Parkes | Free Agent (Later signed for (England) Chelmsford City) | End of Contract | |
| 21 May 2012 | DF | (England) Danny Senda | Free Agent (Later retired) | End of Contract | |
| 21 May 2012 | MF | (England) Sam Cox | Free Agent (Later signed for (England) Hayes & Yeading United) | End of Contract | |
| 21 May 2012 | MF | (Jamaica) Mark Marshall | Free Agent | End of Contract | |
| 21 May 2012 | MF | (France) Alassane N'Diaye | Free Agent (Later signed for (England) Hayes & Yeading United) | End of Contract | |
| 21 May 2012 | FW | (England) Izale McLeod | Free Agent (Later signed for (England) Portsmouth) | End of Contract | |
| 18 June 2012 | MF | (England) Sam Deering | Free agent (Later signed for (England) Cheltenham Town) | End of Contract | |
| 18 June 2012 | MF | (Northern Ireland) Mark Hughes | Free Agent (Later signed for (England) Eastleigh) | End of Contract | |
| 7 January 2013 | DF | (England) Jonathan Fortune | Free Agent (Later signed for (England) Chatham Town) | Mutual Consent | |
| 28 January 2013 | FW | (Netherlands) Melvin Holwijn | Free Agent (Later signed for (Netherlands) Blauw-Wit Amsterdam) | End of Contract | |
| 29 January 2013 | FW | (Netherlands) Collins John | Free Agent (Later signed for (Poland) Piast Gliwice) | Mutual Consent | |
| 1 February 2013 | FW | (Kenya) Taiwo Atieno | Free Agent | Mutual Consent | |
| 12 April 2013 | MF | (England) Anthony Edgar | Free Agent (Later signed for (England) Dagenham & Redbridge) | Mutual Consent | |
| 24 April 2013 | FW | (England) Steve Kabba | Free Agent (Later retired) | Mutual Consent | |

=== Players Loaned In ===
| Date | Pos. | Name | From | Until | Ref. |
|---|---|---|---|---|---|
| 13 September 2012 | DF | (England) Krystian Pearce | (England) Notts County | 15 December 2012 | |
| 22 November 2012 | FW | (England) George Barker | (England) Brighton & Hove Albion | 5 January 2013 | |
| 22 November 2012 | DF | (England) Andy Iro | (England) Stevenage | 9 February 2013 | |
| 4 January 2013 | DF | (Northern Ireland) Adam Thompson | (England) Watford | 14 January 2013 | |
| 10 January 2013 | FW | (England) Ibra Sekajja | (England) Crystal Palace | 7 February 2013 | |
| 15 February 2013 | FW | (Spain) Dani López | (England) Stevenage | 15 March 2013 | |
| 15 February 2013 | DF | (England) Bondz N'Gala | (England) Stevenage | 15 March 2013 | |
| 7 March 2013 | MF | (England) Ross Jenkins | (England) Watford | 4 April 2013 | |
| 14 March 2013 | DF | (Northern Ireland) Tom Flanagan | (England) Milton Keynes Dons | End of season | |
| 22 March 2013 | MF | (England) Kyle De Silva | (England) Crystal Palace | End of season | |

=== Players Loaned Out ===
| Date | Pos. | Name | To | Until | Ref. |
|---|---|---|---|---|---|
| 31 August 2012 | MF | (Portugal) Mauro Vilhete | (England) Boreham Wood | January 2013 | |
| 2 November 2012 | MF | (England) Luke Gambin | (England) Hendon | 30 November 2012 | |
| 16 December 2012 | FW | (England) Jamal Lowe | (England) Hayes & Yeading United | 13 February 2013 | |
| 4 January 2013 | GK | (England) Liam O'Brien | (England) Hastings United | 1 February 2013 | |
| 11 January 2013 | DF | (England) Jack Saville | (England) Ebbsfleet United | May 2013 | |
| 15 February 2013 | FW | (Republic of Ireland) Harry Crawford | (England) Dartford | 15 March 2013 | |
| 15 February 2013 | FW | (England) Jamal Lowe | (England) Boreham Wood | 15 March 2013 | |
| 21 March 2013 | MF | (England) Olly Lee | (England) Birmingham City | End of season | |
| 28 March 2013 | MF | (England) Freddie Warren | (England) Hastings United | End of season | |
