= 2010 HKFC International Soccer Sevens =

Soccer sevens tournament

2010 HKFC International Soccer Sevens, officially known as IP Global HKFC International Soccer 7s due to sponsorship reason, is the 11th staging of this competition. It was held on 14–16 May 2010.

== Notable players ==
=== Masters Tournament ===
- Andy Cole Jura All Stars: Andy Cole, David May, Lee Martin, Clayton Blackmore, Andy Ritchie, Michael Thomas, Ugo Ehiogu, Ian Walker, Frank Sinclair
- Southampton Lloyds TSB All Stars: Ian Baird

=== Main Tournament ===
- Ajax: Nathaniël Will, Vlatko Lazić
- Aston Villa: Benjamin Siegrist, Ciaran Clark, James Collins, Harry Forrester, Marc Albrighton, Andreas Weimann, Nathan Delfouneso, Durrell Berry
- Birmingham City: Jack Butland, Fraser Kerr, Dan Preston, Luke Rowe, Luke Hubbins, Ashley Sammons, Jake Jervis, Jordon Mutch, Brice Ntambwe
- Eastleigh FC: Brett Williams
- Celtic F.C.: Danielle Giordano, Richie Towell, Matty Hughes, Declan Gallagher, Jason Lowdon, James Keatings, Sean Fitzharris, Paul Slane, Callum McGregor
- Rangers F.C.: Andrew Shinnie (Tournament Top Scorer), Scott Gallacher, Andrew Mitchell, Ross Perry, Rhys McCabe, Stephen Stirling, Rory Loy, Dylan McGeouch, Max Wright, Kal Naismith
- West Ham United: Sam Cowler, Cristian Montano, Olly Lee, Anthony Edgar, Luca Maoni, Jordan Spence, Eoin Wearen, Nicky Barrett, Jordan Brown, Callum McNaughton, Ahmed Abdulla

== Masters Tournament – Group Stage ==
Key to colours in group tables
Teams that progressed to the Cup Quarter-finals
Teams that progressed to the Plate Quarter-finals

=== Group A ===
Team	Pld	W	D	L	GF	GA	GD	Pts
Gallic All Stars	3	3	0	0	7	1	+6	9
HKFC Veterans	3	1	1	1	2	2	0	4
Southampton Lloyds TSB All Stars	3	1	0	2	1	4	−3	3
Kowloon Cricket Club	3	0	1	2	2	5	−3	1

14 May 2010
18:00

Southampton Lloyds TSB All Stars	0–1	HKFC Veterans

Hong Kong Football Club Stadium

14 May 2010
18:18

Gallic All Stars	3–1	Kowloon Cricket Club

Hong Kong Football Club Stadium

15 May 2010
08:00

Southampton Lloyds TSB All Stars	1–0	Kowloon Cricket Club

Hong Kong Football Club Stadium

15 May 2010
08:17

Gallic All Stars	1–0	HKFC Veterans

Hong Kong Football Club Stadium

15 May 2010
10:16

HKFC Veterans	1–1	Kowloon Cricket Club

Hong Kong Football Club Stadium

15 May 2010
10:33

Gallic All Stars	3–0	Southampton Lloyds TSB All Stars

Hong Kong Football Club Stadium

=== Group B ===
Team	Pld	W	D	L	GF	GA	GD	Pts
Art Gallery	3	3	0	0	5	0	+5	9
HKFC Chairman's Select	3	1	1	1	2	2	0	4
Bangkok Airways All Stars	3	1	1	1	3	5	−2	4
Nottingham Forest Mobsters	3	0	0	3	1	4	−3	0

14 May 2010
18:36

Art Gallery	1–0	HKFC Chairman's Select

Hong Kong Football Club Stadium

14 May 2010
20:06

Nottingham Forest Mobsters	1–2	Bangkok Airways All Stars

Hong Kong Football Club Stadium

15 May 2010
08:34

Nottingham Forest Mobsters	0–1	HKFC Chairman's Select

Hong Kong Football Club Stadium

15 May 2010
08:51

Art Gallery	3–0	Bangkok Airways All Stars

Hong Kong Football Club Stadium

15 May 2010
10:50

Bangkok Airways All Stars	1–1	HKFC Chairman's Select

Hong Kong Football Club Stadium

15 May 2010
11:07

Art Gallery	1–0	Nottingham Forest Mobsters

Hong Kong Football Club Stadium

=== Group C ===
Team	Pld	W	D	L	GF	GA	GD	Pts
IP Global All Stars	3	2	1	0	2	0	+2	7
Kokusai FC Tokyo	3	1	2	0	2	1	+1	5
Team Bondi	3	1	1	1	2	2	0	4
Yau Yee Select Veterans	3	0	0	3	0	3	−3	0

14 May 2010
18:54

Team Bondi	1–1	Kokusai FC Tokyo

Hong Kong Football Club Stadium

14 May 2010
19:12

IP Global All Stars	1–0	Yau Yee Select Veterans

Hong Kong Football Club Stadium

15 May 2010
12:32

Team Bondi	1–0	Yau Yee Select Veterans

Hong Kong Football Club Stadium

15 May 2010
12:49

IP Global All Stars	0–0	Kokusai FC Tokyo

Hong Kong Football Club Stadium

15 May 2010
14:14

Kokusai FC Tokyo	1–0	Yau Yee Select Veterans

Hong Kong Football Club Stadium

15 May 2010
14:31

IP Global All Stars	1–0	Team Bondi

Hong Kong Football Club Stadium

=== Group D ===
Team	Pld	W	D	L	GF	GA	GD	Pts
SCC Tigers	3	3	0	0	4	0	+4	9
Andy Cole Jura All Stars	3	2	0	1	6	2	+4	6
Tai Po Veterans	3	1	0	2	2	5	−3	3
Bexton FC	3	0	0	3	0	5	−5	0

14 May 2010
19:30

Bexton FC	0–1	Tai Po Veterans

Hong Kong Football Club Stadium

14 May 2010
19:48

Andy Cole Jura All Stars	0–1	SCC Tigers

Hong Kong Football Club Stadium

15 May 2010
16:39

Bexton FC	0–1	SCC Tigers

Hong Kong Football Club Stadium

15 May 2010
16:56

Andy Cole Jura All Stars	3–1	Tai Po Veterans

Hong Kong Football Club Stadium

15 May 2010
18:21

Andy Cole Jura All Stars	3–0	Bexton FC

Hong Kong Football Club Stadium

15 May 2010
18:38

Tai Po Veterans	0–2	SCC Tigers

Hong Kong Football Club Stadium

== Masters Tournament – Knockout Stage ==
Except the quarter-final between IP Global All Stars and Andy Cole Jura All Stars which was held on 15 May, all other matches of the Knockout stage were held on 16 May 2010.

=== Plate ===
- Bottom two teams of each group entered the quarter-finals of Plate.

Quarterfinals
A3	Southampton Lloyds TSB All Stars	0
B4	Nottingham Forest Mobsters	1
C3	Team Bondi	6
D4	Bexton FC	0
B3	Bangkok Airways All Stars	0
A4	Kowloon Cricket Club	1
D3	Tai Po Veterans	0
C4	Yau Yee League Veterans	1

Semifinals
B4	Nottingham Forest Mobsters	0
C3	Team Bondi	1
A4	Kowloon Cricket Club	1 (0)
C4	Yau Yee League Veterans	1 (1)

Finals
C3	Team Bondi	3
C4	Yau Yee League Veterans	0

=== Cup ===
- Top two teams of each group entered the quarter-finals of Cup.

Quarterfinals
A1	Gallic All Stars	0
B2	HKFC Chairman's Select	1
C1	IP Global All Stars	1 (7)
D2	Andy Cole Jura All Stars	1 (8)
B1	Art Gallery	2
A2	Hong Kong Football Club Vets	1
D1	SCC Tigers	0
C2	Kokusai FC Tokyo	1

Semifinals
B2	HKFC Chairman's Select	1
D2	Andy Cole Jura All Stars	2
B1	Art Gallery	0
C2	Kokusai FC Tokyo	1

Finals
D2	Andy Cole Jura All Stars	1
C2	Kokusai FC Tokyo	2

== Main Tournament – Group Stage ==
Key to colours in group tables
Teams that progressed to the Cup Quarter-finals
Teams that progressed to the Plate Quarter-finals

=== Group A ===
Team	Pld	W	D	L	GF	GA	GD	Pts
Tai Po	3	2	1	0	3	2	+1	7
Ajax	3	2	0	1	7	3	+4	6
Singapore Cricket Club	3	1	1	1	5	6	−1	4
Advance Double Flower	3	0	0	3	2	7	−5	0

15 May 2010
09:08

Tai Po	1–0	Advance Double Flower

Hong Kong Football Club Stadium

15 May 2010
09:25

Ajax	4–1	Singapore Cricket Club

Hong Kong Football Club Stadium

15 May 2010
11:24

Tai Po	1–1	Singapore Cricket Club

Hong Kong Football Club Stadium

15 May 2010
11:41

Ajax	3–1	Advance Double Flower

Hong Kong Football Club Stadium

15 May 2010
13:06

Advance Double Flower	1–3	Singapore Cricket Club

Hong Kong Football Club Stadium

15 May 2010
13:23

Ajax	0–1	Tai Po

Hong Kong Football Club Stadium

=== Group B ===
Team	Pld	W	D	L	GF	GA	GD	Pts
Aston Villa	3	2	1	0	6	0	+6	7
Sunderland	3	1	1	1	2	1	+1	4
Eastleigh FC	3	1	0	2	2	5	−3	3
Yau Yee League Select	3	1	0	2	2	6	−4	3

15 May 2010
09:42

Sunderland	2–0	Eastleigh FC

Hong Kong Football Club Stadium

15 May 2010
09:59

Aston Villa	4–0	Yau Yee League Select

Hong Kong Football Club Stadium

15 May 2010
11:58

Sunderland	0–1	Yau Yee League Select

Hong Kong Football Club Stadium

15 May 2010
12:15

Aston Villa	2–0	Eastleigh FC

Hong Kong Football Club Stadium

15 May 2010
13:40

Eastleigh FC	2–1	Yau Yee League Select

Hong Kong Football Club Stadium

15 May 2010
13:57

Aston Villa	0–0	Sunderland

Hong Kong Football Club Stadium

=== Group C ===
Team	Pld	W	D	L	GF	GA	GD	Pts
Rangers	3	3	0	0	5	0	+5	9
West Ham United	3	2	0	1	7	2	+5	6
Tuen Mun	3	1	0	2	2	6	−4	3
HKFC Captain's Select	3	0	0	3	1	7	−6	0

15 May 2010
15:31

West Ham United	4–0	Tuen Mun

Hong Kong Football Club Stadium

15 May 2010
15:48

Rangers	2–0	HKFC Captain's Select

Hong Kong Football Club Stadium

15 May 2010
17:13

West Ham United	3–0	HKFC Captain's Select

Hong Kong Football Club Stadium

15 May 2010
17:30

Rangers	1–0	Tuen Mun

Hong Kong Football Club Stadium

15 May 2010
18:55

Tuen Mun	2–1	HKFC Captain's Select

Hong Kong Football Club Stadium

15 May 2010
19:12

Rangers	2–0	West Ham United

Hong Kong Football Club Stadium

=== Group D ===
Team	Pld	W	D	L	GF	GA	GD	Pts
Birmingham City	3	2	1	0	6	1	+5	7
Glasgow Celtic	3	1	2	0	3	1	+2	5
Happy Valley	3	0	2	1	0	3	−3	2
Hong Kong Football Club	3	0	1	2	0	4	−4	1

15 May 2010
14:05

Birmingham City	3–0	Happy Valley

Hong Kong Football Club Stadium

15 May 2010
16:22

Glasgow Celtic	2–0	Hong Kong Football Club

Hong Kong Football Club Stadium

15 May 2010
17:47

Birmingham City	2–0	Hong Kong Football Club

Hong Kong Football Club Stadium

15 May 2010
18:04

Glasgow Celtic	0–0	Happy Valley

Hong Kong Football Club Stadium

15 May 2010
19:29

Happy Valley	0–0	Hong Kong Football Club

Hong Kong Football Club Stadium

15 May 2010
19:46

Glasgow Celtic	1–1	Birmingham City

Hong Kong Football Club Stadium

== Main Tournament – Knockout Stage ==
Knockout stage was held on 16 May 2010.

=== Plate ===
- Bottom two teams of each group entered the quarter-finals of Plate.

Quarterfinals
A3	Singapore Cricket Club	0 (3)
B4	Yau Yee League Select	0 (4)
C3	Tuen Mun	0 (2)
D4	Hong Kong Football Club	0 (1)
B3	Eastleigh FC	1
A4	Advance Double Flower	0
D3	Happy Valley	0 (2)
C4	HKFC Captain's Select	0 (3)

Semifinals
B4	Yau Yee League Select	1
C3	Tuen Mun	0
B3	Eastleigh FC	1
C4	HKFC Captain's Select	0

Finals
B4	Yau Yee League Select	1
B3	Eastleigh FC	2

=== Shield ===
- Losing teams of Cup quarter-finals entered the semi-finals of Shield.

Quarterfinals
A1	Tai Po	0
B2	Sunderland	3
C1	Rangers	2
D2	Glasgow Celtic	0
B1	Aston Villa	3
A2	Ajax	1
D1	Birmingham City	2
C2	West Ham United	3

Semifinals
A1	Tai Po	0
D2	Glasgow Celtic	4
A2	Ajax	1
D1	Birmingham City	0

Finals
D2	Glasgow Celtic	0
A2	Ajax	2

=== Cup ===
- Top two teams of each group entered the quarter-finals of Cup.

Quarterfinals
A1	Tai Po	0
B2	Sunderland	3
C1	Rangers	2
D2	Glasgow Celtic	0
B1	Aston Villa	3
A2	Ajax	1
D1	Birmingham City	2
C2	West Ham United	3

Semifinals
B2	Sunderland	0
C1	Rangers	3
B1	Aston Villa	3
C2	West Ham United	0

Finals
C1	Rangers	2
B1	Aston Villa	3

== Prize Winners ==
- Masters Tournament – Plate: Team Bondi
- Masters Tournament – Cup: Kokusai FC Tokyo
- Main Tournament – Plate: Eastleigh FC
- Main Tournament – Shield: Ajax
- Main Tournament – Cup: Aston Villa
- Player of the Tournament: Andrew Shinnie (Rangers)
