= Liam O'Brien (footballer, born 1991) =

English footballer

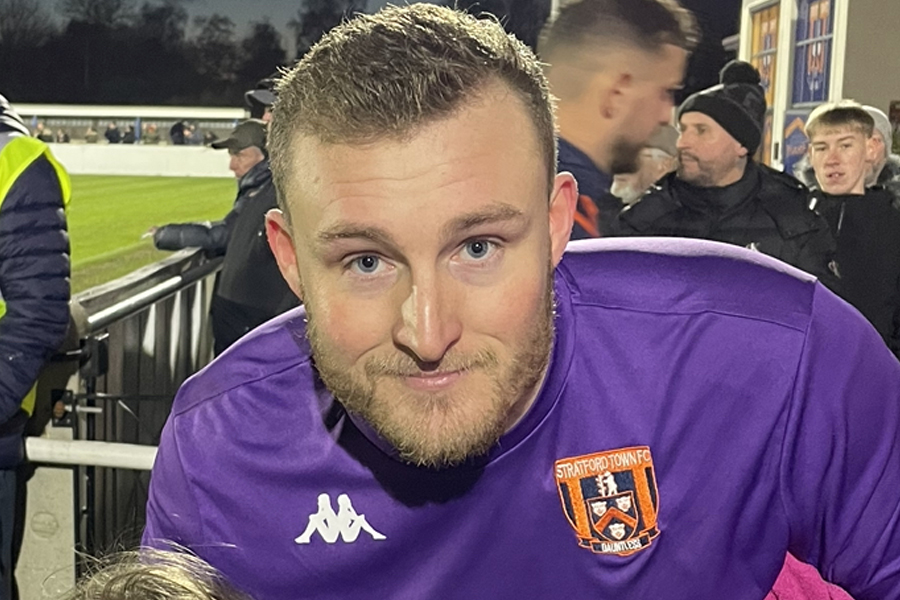
- O'Brien with Stratford Town in December 2022

Personal information
- Full name: Liam Daniel O'Brien
- Date of birth: 30 November 1991 (age 34)
- Place of birth: Ruislip, England
- Height: 6 ft 2 in (1.88 m)
- Position: Goalkeeper

Youth career
- –2008: Queens Park Rangers
- 2008–2010: Portsmouth

Senior career*
| Years | Team | Apps | (Gls) |
| 2009–2010 | Portsmouth | 0 | (0) |
| 2010 | → Eastbourne Borough (loan) | 1 | (0) |
| 2011–2013 | Barnet | 21 | (0) |
| 2013 | → Hastings United (loan) | 4 | (0) |
| 2013–2014 | Brentford | 0 | (0) |
| 2014–2016 | Dagenham & Redbridge | 34 | (0) |
| 2016–2017 | Portsmouth | 0 | (0) |
| 2017–2019 | Coventry City | 11 | (0) |
| 2019–2020 | Yeovil Town | 6 | (0) |
| 2020–2024 | Stratford Town | 90 | (0) |
| 2024–2025 | Bedworth United | 50 | (1) |

International career
| 2010 | England U19 | 1 | (0) |
- * Club domestic league appearances and goals

Liam Daniel O'Brien (born 30 November 1991) is an English retired footballer who played as a goalkeeper. He began his professional career at Portsmouth and received one England U19 cap while at the club.

== Career ==
=== Youth career ===
O'Brien attended Sacred Heart Catholic Primary School in Ruislip and St Joan of Arc Catholic School in Rickmansworth and started his football career as a striker with Ruislip Rangers, one of the longest established youth football clubs in Middlesex. He admitted he became a goalkeeper by accident and commented that he "started off as a pretty average striker and then I wasn't getting into the team. The team were playing a tournament and didn't have a goalkeeper so I had a try. Once I went in I liked it and did quite well". He later signed schoolboy terms at Championship side Queens Park Rangers, the club he supports.

=== Portsmouth ===
In February 2008, after failing to sign scholarship terms at Queens Park Rangers, O'Brien signed a three-year contract with Premier League side Portsmouth after having trialled for Manchester United, Aston Villa, Newcastle United, Sunderland and Arsenal. He was enticed by the prospect of training with then-England international goalkeeper David James. Portsmouth Director of Youth operations Paul Hart commented that "in the present climate there are few decent young English goalkeepers, but for a young boy Liam is mature and confident". He began his two-year scholarship at the beginning of the 2008/09 season. Allotted the number 31 shirt, O'Brien received his maiden call into the first team when he was an unused substitute for a 4-1 league defeat to Liverpool on 15 March 2010. He was named on the bench for two more Premier League games during the 2009/10 season and made eight Premier Reserve League South appearances. Following Portsmouth's relegation, O'Brien was promoted to first team for the 2010/11 season in the Championship. He was an unused substitute for five Championship and League Cup games in August, but his contract was terminated by manager Steve Cotterill in October 2010 and he left the club having failed to make a senior appearance.

==== Eastbourne Borough (loan) ====
On 9 September 2010, O'Brien joined Conference Premier side Eastbourne Borough on loan, after seeking a move away from Portsmouth when the ailing club scrapped its reserve team. O'Brien made his debut in a 4–0 heavy defeat against Barrow two days later. O'Brien returned to Portsmouth in October, having made just one appearance.

=== Barnet ===
O'Brien signed a contract with League Two side Barnet in January 2011 after training with the club for a month. Awarded the number 18 shirt, he made his Barnet debut and the first Football League appearance of his career on 8 January 2011 in a 3–1 win over Bradford City. O'Brien battled it out with Jake Cole and loanee Sam Walker for the number 1 jersey and made eight appearances during the remainder of the 2010/11 season. Under new manager Lawrie Sanchez, O'Brien served mainly as backup to new first-choice keeper Dean Brill and made only 11 appearances during the 2011/12 season. After starting in Barnet's first four games of the 2012/13 season, O'Brien found himself appearing sporadically as an unused substitute and he was last called into the squad for a 2-0 FA Cup first round defeat to Oxford United on 3 November 2012. The arrival of Graham Stack and Sam Cowler further pushed O'Brien down the pecking order. Following Barnet's relegation to the Conference Premier in May 2013, O'Brien was released by the club. He made 23 appearances during his two and a half years at Barnet.

==== Hastings United (loan) ====
Isthmian League Premier Division side Hastings United signed O'Brien on a one-month loan in January 2013, after first choice keeper Matt Armstrong-Ford picked up a knee injury just before the club's FA Cup third round tie against Championship side Middlesbrough. O'Brien saved a penalty from Ishmael Miller but Hastings eventually fell to a 4–1 defeat. After five appearances, O'Brien's loan at Hastings was cut short due to a groin injury.

=== Brentford ===
On 15 August 2013, O'Brien signed a three-month deal with League One side Brentford, as backup for keepers Richard Lee, David Button and Jack Bonham. Awarded the number 21 shirt, his first involvement with the first team came on 14 September, when he was an unused substitute for a 4-2 league victory over Tranmere Rovers. O'Brien made his debut for the Brentford Development Squad the following Tuesday in a 1-1 Professional U21 Development League 2 South draw with Brighton & Hove Albion. On 15 November 2013, O'Brien signed a two-month contract extension. On 14 January 2014, it was announced that O'Brien had been awarded a contract extension until the end of the 2013/14 season. It was revealed on 29 April that O'Brien would be released from his contract at the end of the season. He failed to make a first team appearance during his time with the Bees and only made a single outing for the Development Squad. O'Brien's departure was confirmed with an announcement on 14 May.

=== Dagenham & Redbridge ===
On 29 May 2014, O'Brien signed a two-year contract with League Two Dagenham & Redbridge. On 12 August, he faced his former side Brentford in the League Cup First Round where his team lost 4–2 on penalties after a 6-6 thriller. In May 2016 as his contract expired, he was released along with eleven players as Dagenham were relegated to the National League.

=== Return to Portsmouth ===
On 8 August 2016, O'Brien signed a short-term deal with his first professional club Portsmouth. He finally made his debut for the club on 30 August, starting in a 4–3 EFL Trophy away loss against Yeovil Town.

=== Yeovil Town ===
On 2 September 2019, O'Brien signed for National League side Yeovil Town on an undisclosed length short-term deal. In January 2020, O'Brien's contract was extended until the end of the 2019–20 season.

== International career ==
O'Brien was called into the England U19 squad for a friendly versus the Netherlands in February 2010 and won his first cap. He was an unused substitute for a 4-0 2010 European U19 Championship elite qualification victory over Bosnia and Herzegovina on 28 May 2010. O'Brien was called into the squad for the finals, but was removed at the request of Steve Cotterill, due to injuries suffered by the Portsmouth's first team goalkeepers.

== Personal life ==
O'Brien said that "losing a friend and a truly great player", Kiyan Prince, while at Queens Park Rangers, was the worst moment of his career.

== Career statistics ==
As of match played on 29 February 2020

Appearances and goals by club, season and competition
| Club | Season | League | | | FA Cup | | League Cup | | Other | | Total | |
| Club | Season | Division | Apps | Goals | Apps | Goals | Apps | Goals | Apps | Goals | Apps | Goals |
|---|---|---|---|---|---|---|---|---|---|---|---|---|
| Portsmouth | 2009–10 | Premier League | 0 | 0 | 0 | 0 | 0 | 0 | — | | 0 | 0 |
| Portsmouth | 2010–11 | Championship | 0 | 0 | — | | 0 | 0 | — | | 0 | 0 |
| Portsmouth | Total | | 0 | 0 | 0 | 0 | 0 | 0 | — | | 0 | 0 |
| Eastbourne Borough (loan) | 2010–11 | Conference Premier | 1 | 0 | — | | — | | — | | 1 | 0 |
| Barnet | 2010–11 | League Two | 8 | 0 | — | | — | | — | | 8 | 0 |
| Barnet | 2011–12 | League Two | 10 | 0 | 0 | 0 | 0 | 0 | 1 (Note: Appearance(s) in EFL Trophy) | 0 | 11 | 0 |
| Barnet | 2012–13 | League Two | 3 | 0 | — | | 1 | 0 | 0 | 0 | 4 | 0 |
| Barnet | Total | | 21 | 0 | 0 | 0 | 1 | 0 | 1 | 0 | 23 | 0 |
| Hastings United (loan) | 2012–13 | IL Premier Division | 4 | 0 | 1 | 0 | — | | — | | 5 | 0 |
| Brentford | 2013–14 | League One | 0 | 0 | 0 | 0 | 0 | 0 | 0 | 0 | 0 | 0 |
| Dagenham & Redbridge | 2014–15 | League Two | 10 | 0 | 0 | 0 | 1 | 0 | 1 | 0 | 12 | 0 |
| Dagenham & Redbridge | 2015–16 | League Two | 24 | 0 | 1 | 0 | 0 | 0 | 2 | 0 | 27 | 0 |
| Dagenham & Redbridge | Total | | 34 | 0 | 1 | 0 | 1 | 0 | 3 | 0 | 39 | 0 |
| Portsmouth | 2016–17 | League Two | 0 | 0 | 0 | 0 | 0 | 0 | 3 | 0 | 3 | 0 |
| Coventry City | 2017–18 | League Two | 7 | 0 | 1 | 0 | 1 | 0 | 2 | 0 | 11 | 0 |
| Coventry City | 2018–19 | League One | 4 | 0 | 0 | 0 | 1 | 0 | 3 | 0 | 8 | 0 |
| Coventry City | Total | | 11 | 0 | 1 | 0 | 2 | 0 | 5 | 0 | 19 | 0 |
| Yeovil Town | 2019–20 | National League | 6 | 0 | 0 | 0 | — | | 2 (Note: One appearance in FA Trophy, one appearance in Somerset Premier Cup) | 0 | 8 | 0 |
| Stratford Town | 2020–21 | SL Premier Division Central | 0 | 0 | 0 | 0 | — | | 0 | 0 | 0 | 0 |
| Stratford Town | 2021–22 | SL Premier Division Central | 33 | 0 | 6 | 0 | — | | 2 (Note: One appearance in FA Trophy, one appearance in Southern League Cup) | 0 | 41 | 0 |
| Stratford Town | 2022–23 | SL Premier Division Central | 35 | 0 | 1 | 0 | — | | 0 | 0 | 36 | 0 |
| Stratford Town | 2023–24 | SL Premier Division Central | 22 | 0 | 1 | 0 | — | | 1 (Note: Appearance in FA Trophy) | 0 | 24 | 0 |
| Stratford Town | Total | | 90 | 0 | 8 | 0 | — | | 3 | 0 | 101 | 0 |
| Bedworth United | 2023–24 | NPL Midlands Division | 13 | 0 | — | | — | | — | | 13 | 0 |
| Bedworth United | 2024–25 | NPL Midlands Division | 21 | 0 | 0 | 0 | — | | 1 | 0 | 22 | 0 |
| Bedworth United | Total | | 34 | 0 | 0 | 0 | — | | 1 | 0 | 35 | 0 |
| Career total | | | 201 | 0 | 11 | 0 | 4 | 0 | 18 | 0 | 234 | 0 |

== Honours ==
Coventry City

- EFL League Two play-offs: 2018
