= St Joan of Arc Catholic School, Rickmansworth =

St. Joan of Arc Catholic School
- JOA

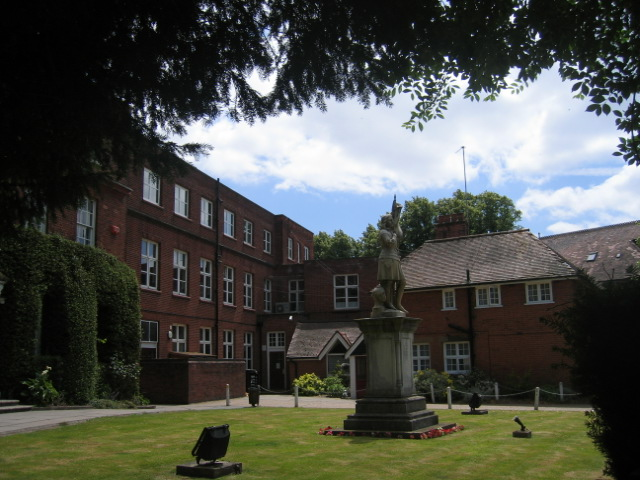
- St Joan of Arc School (The Elms), Rickmansworth, Hertfordshire

Location
- High Street; Rickmansworth, Hertfordshire, WD3 1HG; England

Information
- Type: Academy
- Motto: Follow Jesus on the road of human life / Fidelis ad mortem
- Religious affiliation: Roman Catholic
- Established: 1904
- Department for Education URN: 137914 Tables
- Ofsted: Reports
- Headteacher: Bernadette O'Hanlon
- Chaplain: Deacon Liam
- Years offered: 7-13
- Gender: Co-educational
- Enrollment: 1229 (2023)
- Houses: Bakhita, Kolbe, Romero, Jerome(This is repeated again on the second half of the year)
- Colours: Maroon Rifle Green , McDuff Tartan
- Nickname: JOA's
- Rival: Rickmansworth School
- Affiliation: Catholicism
- Website: joa.herts.sch.uk

Saint Joan of Arc Roman Catholic School is a Roman Catholic secondary school and sixth form with academy status, located in Rickmansworth, Hertfordshire, England. The catchment area for the school spreads over South West Hertfordshire, parts of Buckinghamshire and parts of North West London.

== History ==
=== 20th Century ===
St Joan of Arc School for Girls was instigated by an order of French nuns, the Filles de Jesus, in 1904 with just five pupils.

The school continued to grow in size and reputation through the early years of the 20th Century until 1951 when it was granted grammar school status. In 1975, as with the majority of grammar schools across the country, St Joan of Arc moved to become a comprehensive school and switched to a co-educational facility. During 1978, the school also set the Guinness World Record for balloon bursting; the school managed to burst 2,000 balloons in 14 minutes 14.5 seconds.

=== 21st Century ===
In 2002, pupils at the school worked together to relaunch the school website, becoming the first pupil-run website in the area and having been considered for the 2002 BECTA (British Educational Community and Technology Agency) awards. The school was awarded Specialist Status for Mathematics & Computing in 2003 and in 2012, St Joan of Arc converted to become an academy as the founding school of the 'All Saints Catholic Academy Trust' (ASCAT). Since changing to Academy status, the schools OFSTED rating was lowered from 'Outstanding' to 'Good'; headteacher Mr Sweeney cited changes in the methods used by OFSTED as one of the reasons for the difference.

During the 2019 Coronavirus outbreak, as per national guidelines, St Joan of Arc closed completely and with other schools in the district donated vital protective equipment to local hospitals to help the fight against the virus.

== School site ==
The school is about 0.6 kilometres (0.4 mi) from Rickmansworth station in Rickmansworth Town Centre.

The Parish priest at St Mary's in Rickmansworth, Fr Julien, bought the initial property, 11 High Street, known as 'Englefield, and this was the original site of St Joan of Arc School. Englefield was the large Edwardian house that currently houses the St Joan of Arc sixth form. This was to be the site for St Joan of Arc School until 1922. A need for greater space lead to the Mother Superior (Mother Septima) and Fr Julien acquiring 'The Elms'.

The Elms was a grand Georgian estate built in 1728 consisting of the house and eleven and a half acres with a stream running through the grounds. The house was the residence of George Eliot at the time that she was writing her novel Daniel Deronda.

The school grounds back on to the River Chess and Chess Valley, and a 17th-century barn that once belonged to the Abbot of St Albans Cathedral is at the boundary of the grounds.

== Controversies ==
In 2014, Head of Music at St Joan of Arc, Derek Berditch was arrested with over 50,000 images of both child sexual abuse material and bestiality on hard drives. The arrest came after a police investigation into a paedophile ring identified by an Internet service provider as distributing child sexual abuse material involving children as young as 6 years old. Derek Berditch pleaded guilty to the charges and was jailed at Southwark Crown Court on 5 August 2014 for 18 months and ordered to register on the sexual offenders register for 10 years.

== Notable former pupils ==
- Mary Portas (b. 1960) - television presenter and retail consultant
- David Connolly (b. 1977) - professional footballer Feyenoord and SBV Excelsior
- Kate Nash (b. 1987) - singer, songwriter, musician and actress
- Alex Campana (b. 1988) - non-professional footballer
- Danny May (b. 1988) - non-professional footballer
- Liam O'Brien (b. 1991) - footballer
- Mikee Goodman, heavy metal vocalist
