= Ishmail Kamara =

Sierra Leonean footballer

Personal information
- Full name: Ishmail Foday Kamara
- Date of birth: 29 October 1987 (age 39)
- Place of birth: Sierra Leone
- Height: 6 ft 1 in (1.85 m)
- Position: Forward

Team information
- Current team: Haringey Borough

Senior career*
Years	Team	Apps	(Gls)
2004–2005	Issia Wazi	16	(7)
2006	Virginia Beach Mariners	14	(0)
2007	Northern Virginia Royals	2	(0)
2007	Thai Honda	23	(13)
2008	Real Maryland	7	(0)
2009–2010	Motala AIF	7	(2)
2010–2011	Margate	8	(0)
2011	Maidenhead United	2	(0)
2011–2012	Dulwich Hamlet	25	(14)
2012–2013	Barnet	1	(0)
2013–2014	Dartford	5	(0)
2014	→ VCD Athletic (loan)	?	(?)
2014–2015	Bishop's Stortford	2	(1)
2014	→ Canvey Island (loan)	12	(0)
2015–	Haringey Borough	21	(2)

International career^{‡}
2007–2008	Sierra Leone	5	(0)
- * Club domestic league appearances and goals as of 22:05, 17 March 2016 (UTC) ‡ National team caps and goals as of 11:54, 22 December 2013 (UTC)

Ishmail Foday Kamara (born 29 October 1987) is an association football player from Sierra Leone. He has gained five international caps for national football team.

== Career ==
Kamara's career has taken him all over the world, playing for sides in countries such as Sweden, Thailand, USA and Ivory Coast. In August 2010, he joined Isthmian League Premier Division club Margate from Motala AIF, at Margate he joined up with Sierra Leone teammate John Keister.

In September 2010 Kamara had a short trial at Leeds United Kamara signed for Isthmian League South Division side Dulwich Hamlet making his debut on 16 November 2011 against Walton and Hersham. He finished the season with 15 goals in 23 league games.

In October 2012, Kamara signed for Barnet, after trials with other Football League clubs including Portsmouth and Watford. He made his debut as an 80th-minute substitute for Oliver Lee against Fleetwood Town, but suffered a dislocated shoulder just minutes after coming on which kept him out until towards the end of the season. This was the only game he played for the senior team in the 2012/13 season, as well as playing a handful of games for the under-21 side. He was then released at the end of the season. Kamara joined Conference Premier side Dartford in December 2013. After the end of the 2013–14 season, he left Dartford, and subsequently joined Bishop's Stortford at the start of the 2014–15 season.

== International career ==
Kamara has five caps for the Sierra Leone national side.

== Career statistics ==
=== Club ===
As of match played 21 January 2014.

Club statistics
Club	Season	League			FA Cup		League Cup		Other		Total	
Club	Season	Division	Apps	Goals	Apps	Goals	Apps	Goals	Apps	Goals	Apps	Goals
Margate	2010–11	Isthmian Premier Division	8	0	2	1	—		0	0	10	1
Maidenhead United	2011–12	Conference South	2	0	0	0	—		0	0	2	0
Dulwich Hamlet	2011–12	Isthmian Division One South	25	14	0	0	—		4 (Note: Two appearances in Isthmian League Cup, two in London Senior Cup)	1	29	15
Barnet	2012–13	League Two	1	0	0	0	0	0	0	0	1	0
Dartford	2013–14	Conference Premier	5	0	0	0	—		1 (Note: Appearance in Kent Senior Cup)	0	6	0
Career total			41	14	2	1	0	0	5	1	48	16

=== International ===
As of match played 14 June 2008

International statistics
National team	Year	Apps	Goals
Sierra Leone	2007	2	0
Sierra Leone	2008	3	0
Total		5	0
