= Jake Hyde =

English footballer

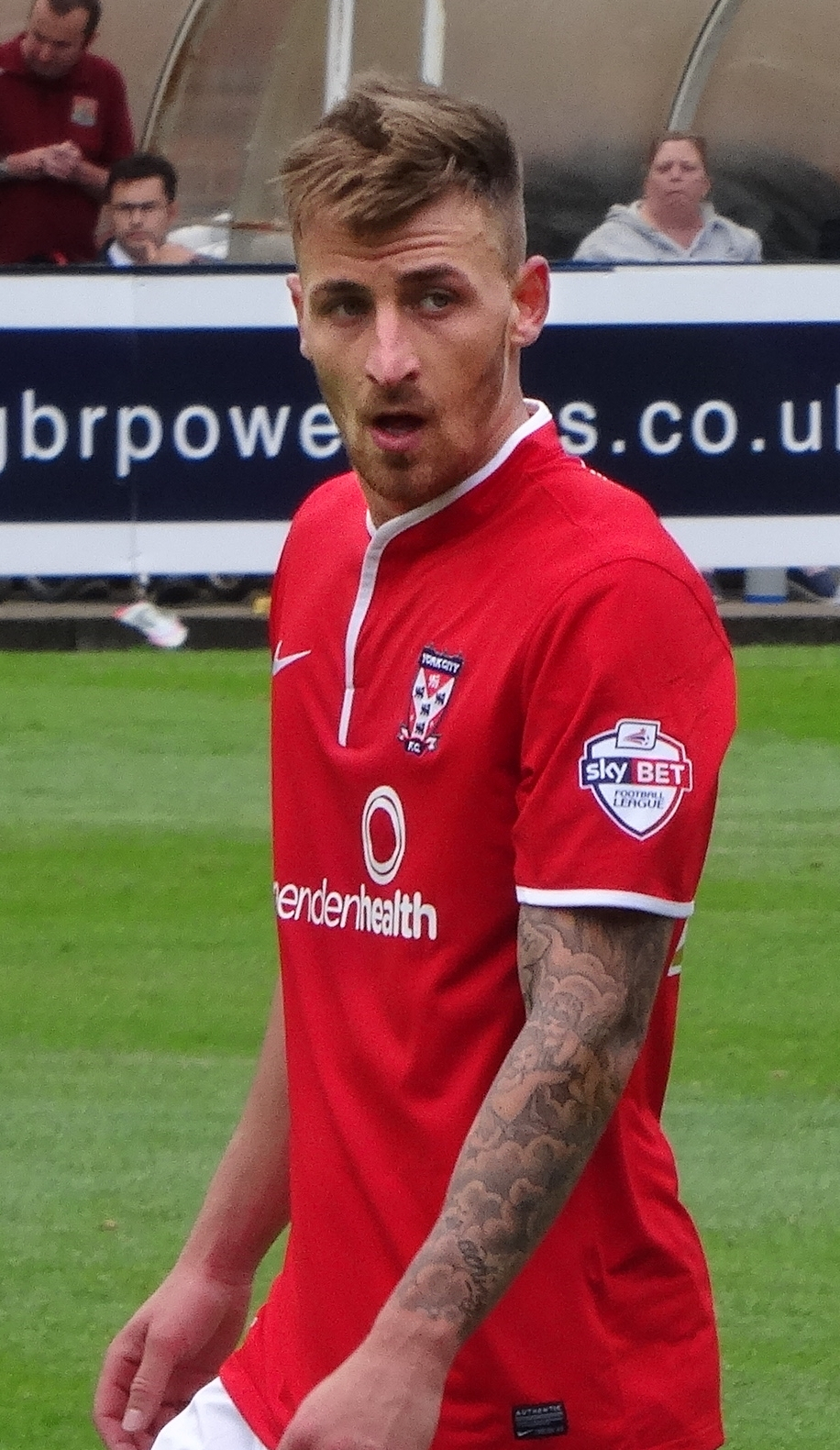
- Hyde playing for York City in 2014

Personal information
- Full name: Jake Matthew Hyde
- Date of birth: 1 July 1990 (age 36)
- Place of birth: Maidenhead, England
- Height: 6 ft 1 in (1.85 m)
- Position: Striker

Youth career
- –2008: Swindon Town

Senior career*
Years	Team	Apps	(Gls)
2008–2009	Swindon Town	0	(0)
2008	→ Weymouth (loan)	5	(1)
2009	→ Weymouth (loan)	6	(0)
2009–2010	Barnet	34	(6)
2010–2011	Hayes & Yeading United	9	(2)
2011	Lochee United	0	(0)
2011	Dunfermline Athletic	2	(0)
2011–2012	Dundee	26	(6)
2012–2014	Barnet	67	(26)
2014–2016	York City	50	(9)
2016–2017	Stevenage	6	(0)
2017	→ Maidenhead United (loan)	0	(0)
2017–2018	Maidenhead United	32	(5)
2018–2020	Woking	60	(27)
2020–2021	FC Halifax Town	26	(13)
2021–2023	Wrexham	14	(3)
2022–2023	→ Southend United (loan)	18	(4)
2023–2024	Yeovil Town	19	(5)
2024–2025	Chelmsford City	31	(5)
2025–2026	Woking	2	(0)
Total		409	(114)

International career
2013	England C	1	(0)

Managerial career
- 2026: Woking (joint-interim)
- 2026: Woking (joint-interim)
- * Club domestic league appearances and goals as of 15:40, 25 April 2025 (UTC)

Jake Matthew Hyde (born 1 July 1990) is an English professional football coach and former player who played as a striker.

Hyde started his career with Swindon Town, signing a professional contract in 2008 and spending time on loan with Weymouth in the Conference Premier. After leaving Swindon, he joined Barnet in 2009, before spells with Hayes & Yeading United, Dundee and Dunfermline Athletic. He returned to Barnet in 2012, where he finished as the club's top scorer during the 2012–13 season, before joining York City in 2014 and Stevenage in 2016.

Following his release from Stevenage, Hyde continued his career in the National League with Maidenhead United, Woking, FC Halifax Town and Wrexham, with a loan spell at Southend United. He later played for Yeovil Town and Chelmsford City before returning to Woking in 2025 as a strength and conditioning coach while remaining registered as a player. He announced his retirement from playing in 2026.

== Club career ==
Hyde was born in Maidenhead, Berkshire. He began his career at Swindon Town in their youth system, and when still a second-year scholar he signed a one-and-a-half-year professional contract with the club on 19 February 2008. During the length of his contract he had two loan spells with Weymouth in the Conference Premier. Hyde was released by Swindon in May 2009 and signed for League Two club Barnet on 2 July. He made his debut in a 1–0 away defeat to Lincoln City on 8 August 2009 and scored two goals, with a header and a penalty kick, against Shrewsbury Town a week later. Hyde's most notable contribution of the 2009–10 season came with the stoppage time winner over Notts County on 29 August 2009, having entered the match as a 90th minute substitute. Having scored a number of goals for Barnet early in the season, he was mostly used as a substitute in the second half of the season before being released in May 2010. He was named Barnet's Young Player of the Year, having scored 7 goals in 39 appearances for the club.

Hyde signed for Conference Premier club Hayes & Yeading United in October 2010 and made his debut in a 3–1 away victory over Poole Town in the FA Cup fourth qualifying round on 23 October. His first goal came in a 3–2 away defeat against Mansfield Town on 20 November 2010. Hyde was released by Hayes & Yeading in January 2011 having scored two goals in 12 appearances.

In March 2011, he signed for Scottish junior club Lochee United, enabling him to play for Dundee of the Scottish First Division as a trialist, with Dundee unable to sign anyone via permanent transfer or loan due to their transfer embargo. Having scored on his debut in a 1–1 home draw with Dunfermline Athletic on 22 March 2011, he scored twice four days later in a 2–2 home draw, this time against Cowdenbeath. Hyde's goal against Dunfermline Athletic brought him to the attention of their manager Jim McIntyre, and he signed for them as an amateur in late March 2011 for the rest of 2010–11. After making two appearances he was released by Dunfermline in May 2011 and subsequently rejoined Dundee on 20 June on a one-year contract. He scored 6 goals in 30 appearances in 2011–12.

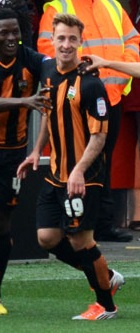
Hyde playing for Barnet in 2012

After a successful trial with Barnet, Hyde rejoined the League Two club on 26 July 2012. He scored the last ever goal at Underhill Stadium with an 81st-minute winner against Wycombe Wanderers in a 1–0 win on 20 April 2013. He was Barnet's top scorer with 14 goals from 42 appearances in 2012–13, which ended with the club's relegation into the Conference Premier. Hyde was named on Barnet's retained list in May 2013 with the club exercising a clause to extend his contract for another year. However, he was transfer listed at his own request the following month, with the club willing to listen to offers for him. League Two club York City expressed an interest in signing Hyde during the summer, but they were unable to meet Barnet's valuation of him after he scored four goals in the first five matches of 2013–14. He remained at the club after the transfer deadline, and despite missing much of the season through injury was Barnet's second highest scorer with 12 goals in 28 appearances, one behind Keanu Marsh-Brown with 13. He was offered a new one-year contract by Barnet, but was transfer listed again in April 2014 to attract interest in him, after expressing his desire to play in the Football League.

Hyde joined League Two club York City on 2 June 2014 on a three-year contract, with Barnet due a compensation fee. He made his debut in a 1–1 home draw with Northampton Town on 16 August 2014, and scored York's goal at the near post from an Anthony Straker corner. On 4 December 2014, Barnet were awarded £25,000 at the transfer tribunal, possibly rising to £40,000 based on appearances.

On 6 July 2016, Hyde joined League Two club Stevenage on undisclosed terms, after being released from his contract with York. On 16 February 2017, he joined National League South club Maidenhead United on a one-month loan. He was released by Stevenage at the end of 2016–17. On 26 June 2017, Hyde signed for Maidenhead permanently, following their promotion to the National League.

Hyde signed for newly relegated National League South club Woking on 16 July 2018. He made his debut on 4 August 2018 in a 1–0 win away to East Thurrock United, playing the whole match. He scored his first goal three days later, scoring an 81st-minute equalising goal in a 2–1 home victory against St Albans City.

On 14 August 2020, Hyde made the switch to fellow National League side, FC Halifax Town on a two-year deal. He scored 12 goals in 28 games for the Shaymen in the 2020-21 season.

In July 2021, Hyde joined Wrexham on a two-year deal for an undisclosed fee. On 1 August 2022, Hyde signed for fellow National League side Southend United on a season-long loan deal.

Hyde joined Yeovil Town for the 2023–24 season. At the end of the 2023–24 season, Hyde was released by Yeovil following the club's promotion from the National League South.

On 15 June 2024, Hyde signed for Chelmsford City. Following the conclusion of the 2024–25 season, Hyde was released by Chelmsford City.

Hyde re-joined Woking for the 2025–26 season as strength and conditioning coach, while also being registered as a player.

On 25 April 2026, Hyde announced his retirement from football upon the conclusion of the 2025–26 season.

== International career ==
Hyde was called up to the England C squad for a friendly against a Latvia under-23 team on 10 September 2013. He played the first 45 minutes of the match, which England lost 1–0.

== Coaching career ==
On 1 March 2026, after the exit of first-team manager Neal Ardley, Hyde was appointed to take interim charge of Woking alongside Dale Gorman and Craig Ross. During his interim spell in charge, Hyde, alongside Gorman and Ross, guided the team to four wins from eight matches before Jermain Defoe was appointed first-team manager at the end of March.

On 24 July 2026, Hyde and Ross were reinstated as interim first-team managers following Defoe's abrupt departure just two weeks before the start of the 2026–27 campaign. On 1 November 2026, Woking announced Hyde had left the club in order to focus on his business commitments.

== Career statistics ==
As of match played 25 April 2026

Appearances and goals by club, season and competition
Club	Season	League			National Cup (Note: Includes FA Cup, Scottish Cup)		League Cup (Note: Includes League Cup, Scottish League Cup)		Other		Total	
Club	Season	Division	Apps	Goals	Apps	Goals	Apps	Goals	Apps	Goals	Apps	Goals
Swindon Town	2007–08	League One	0	0	0	0	0	0	0	0	0	0
Swindon Town	2008–09	League One	0	0	0	0	0	0	0	0	0	0
Swindon Town	Total		0	0	0	0	0	0	0	0	0	0
Weymouth (loan)	2007–08	Conference Premier	5	1	—		—		1 (Note: Appearance in Conference League Cup)	0	6	1
Weymouth (loan)	2008–09	Conference Premier	6	0	—		—		—		6	0
Weymouth (loan)	Total		11	1	—		—		1	0	12	1
Barnet	2009–10	League Two	34	6	2	0	1	0	2 (Note: Appearance(s) in Football League Trophy)	1	39	7
Hayes & Yeading United	2010–11	Conference Premier	9	2	2	0	—		1 (Note: Appearance(s) in FA Trophy)	0	12	2
Dundee (trial)	2010–11	Scottish First Division	2	3	—		—		—		2	3
Dunfermline Athletic	2010–11	Scottish First Division	2	0	—		—		—		2	0
Dundee	2011–12	Scottish First Division	26	6	1	0	2	0	1 (Note: Appearance in Scottish Challenge Cup)	0	30	6
Barnet	2012–13	League Two	40	14	0	0	1	0	1	0	42	14
Barnet	2013–14	Conference Premier	27	12	0	0	—		1	0	28	12
Barnet	Total		67	26	0	0	1	0	2	0	70	26
York City	2014–15	League Two	39	9	2	1	0	0	1	0	42	10
York City	2015–16	League Two	11	0	1	0	1	0	1	0	14	0
York City	Total		50	9	3	1	1	0	2	0	56	10
Stevenage	2016–17	League Two	6	0	0	0	1	0	2 (Note: Appearances in EFL Trophy)	0	9	0
Maidenhead United (loan)	2016–17	National League South	0	0	—		—		—		0	0
Maidenhead United	2017–18	National League	32	5	2	0	—		3	2	37	7
Maidenhead United	Total		32	5	2	0	—		3	2	37	7
Woking	2018–19	National League South	28	11	6	3	—		4 (Note: Two appearances in FA Trophy, two appearances and one goal in National League South play-offs)	1	38	15
Woking	2019–20	National League	32	16	2	0	—		1	0	35	16
Woking	Total		60	27	8	3	—		5	1	73	31
FC Halifax Town	2020–21	National League	26	13	1	0	—		0	0	27	13
Wrexham	2021–22	National League	14	3	1	0	—		1 (Note: One appearance in the National League play-offs)	0	16	3
Wrexham	2022–23	National League	0	0	0	0	—		0	0	0	0
Wrexham	Total		14	3	1	0	—		1	0	16	3
Southend United (loan)	2022–23	National League	18	4	1	0	—		0	0	19	4
Yeovil Town	2023–24	National League South	19	5	3	0	—		1	0	23	5
Chelmsford City	2024–25	National League South	31	5	2	0	—		1	0	34	5
Woking	2025–26	National League	2	0	0	0	—		1 (Note: Appearance in National League Cup)	0	3	0
Career total			409	114	26	4	6	0	23	4	464	122

== Managerial statistics ==
As of match played 31 November 2026

Managerial record by team and tenure
Team	From	To	Record					Ref.
Team	From	To	P	W	D	L	Win %	Ref.
Woking (interim)	1 March 2026	29 March 2026	8	4	3	1	50.0	
Woking (interim)	24 July 2026	1 November 2026	20	8	3	9	40.0	
Total			18	7	6	5	38.9	

== Honours ==
Woking

- National League South play-offs: 2019

Wrexham

- FA Trophy runner-up: 2021–22

Yeovil Town

- National League South: 2023–24
