= 2011–12 Dundee F.C. season =

Dundee
2011–12 season
- Chairman: Stuart Murphy (Until 17 November 2011)
- Manager: Barry Smith
- Stadium: Dens Park
- Scottish First Division: 2nd
- Challenge Cup: Second round, lost to Falkirk
- League Cup: Second round, lost to Aberdeen
- Scottish Cup: Fourth round, lost to Kilmarnock
- Top goalscorer: League: Steven Milne (11); Ryan Conroy (11); All: Steven Milne (16)
- Highest home attendance: 5,862 vs. Greenock Morton, 26 December 2011
- Lowest home attendance: 3,136 vs. Ayr United, 27 March 2012
- Average home league attendance: 4,224
Home colours	Away colours

The 2011–12 season was Dundee's seventh consecutive season in the Scottish First Division, having been relegated from the Scottish Premier League at the end of the 2004–05 season. Dundee also competed in the Challenge Cup, League Cup and the Scottish Cup. Dundee was promoted to the Scottish Premier League at the end of the campaign after Rangers' liquidation meant a 2nd-place finish was enough to be promoted.

== Summary ==
Dundee finished second in the First Division. They reached the second round of the Challenge Cup, the second round of the League Cup and the fourth round of the Scottish Cup.

== Results and fixtures ==
=== Preseason ===
Win Draw Loss Postponed

7 July 2011 Friendly	Turriff United	0–3	Dundee	The Haughs, Turriff
		Dundee Report	Lockwood 54' (pen.); Milne 65'; McIntosh 83'	Referee: Kerrigan

9 July 2011 Friendly	Formartine United	1–5	Dundee	North Lodge Park, Pitmedden
	R. Campbell 35'	Dundee Report	Milne 9', 40'; Hyde 22'; Chisholm 33'; McIntosh 92'

13 July 2011 Friendly	Dundee	0–2	St Johnstone	Dens Park, Dundee
		Dundee Report	May 19'; Mackay 50'	Attendance: 2,172; Referee: Finnie

16 July 2011 East Fife Tournament Semi-Final	Dundee	2–0	Southend United	Bayview Stadium, Methil
	Webster 20'; Bayne 91'	Dundee Report		Referee: Dallas

17 July 2011 East Fife Tournament	East Fife	1–0	Dundee	Bayview Stadium, Methil
	McKinlay 18'	Dundee Report		Referee: Colvin

=== Scottish First Division ===
6 August 2011 First Division	Partick Thistle	0–1	Dundee	Firhill Stadium, Glasgow
		BBC Sport	Lockwood 90' (pen.)	Attendance: 3,065; Referee: Conroy

13 August 2011 First Division	Dundee	1–1	Ayr United	Dens Park, Dundee
	Hyde 30'	Dundee Report	Moffat 14'	Attendance: 4,686; Referee: O'Reilly

20 August 2011 First Division	Livingston	4–2	Dundee	Braidwood Motor Company Stadium, Livingston
	Russell 4'; Deuchar 13', 59'; Keaghan Jacobs 90'	BBC Sport	Irvine 61'; McNeil 65' (o.g.)	Attendance: 1,996; Referee: Hilland

27 August 2011 First Division	Dundee	0–1	Greenock Morton	Dens Park, Dundee
		BBC Sport	MacDonald 7'	Attendance: 4,096; Referee: McDermott

10 September 2011 First Division	Raith Rovers	0–1	Dundee	Stark's Park, Kirkcaldy
		BBC Sport	O'Donnell (yellow card) 28' (red card); Riley 86'	Attendance: 2,459; Referee: Allan

17 September 2011 First Division	Falkirk	2–1	Dundee	Falkirk Stadium, Falkirk
	Weatherston 79'; El Alagui 86'	BBC Sport	Milne 45'	Attendance: 3,576; Referee: McLean

24 September 2011 First Division	Dundee	0–1	Hamilton Academical	Dens Park, Dundee
		BBC Sport	McLaughlin 66'	Attendance: 4,186; Referee: Madden

1 October 2011 First Division	Queen of the South	0–0	Dundee	Palmerston Park, Dumfries
		BBC Sport		Attendance: 1,649; Referee: Tumilty

15 October 2011 First Division	Dundee	1–2	Ross County	Dens Park, Dundee
	Lockwood 25' (pen.)	BBC Sport	McMenamin 39'; Quinn 63'	Attendance: 4,030; Referee: Finnie

22 October 2011 First Division	Ayr United	1–3	Dundee	Somerset Park, Ayr
	Roberts 83' (pen.)	BBC Sport	Weston 16'; McIntosh 71'; Milne 87'	Attendance: 1,390; Referee: McKendrick

29 October 2011 First Division	Dundee	0–1	Partick Thistle	Dens Park, Dundee
	Douglas (red card) 25'	Dundee Report	Cairney 26' (pen.)	Attendance: 4,263; Referee: McLean

5 November 2011 First Division	Dundee	1–0	Raith Rovers	Dens Park, Dundee
	Conroy 83'	BBC Sport		Attendance: 4,258; Referee: Murray

12 November 2011 First Division	Greenock Morton	1–2	Dundee	Cappielow Park, Greenock
	Jackson 5'	SFL Report	Rae 42'; Conroy 56'	Attendance: 2,201; Referee: O'Reilly

26 November 2011 First Division	Dundee	4–2	Falkirk	Dens Park, Dundee
	Rae 8'; Hyde 11', 67'; Milne 85'	SFL Report	Weston 35' (o.g.); Fulton 74'	Attendance: 4,507; Referee: Conroy

3 December 2011 First Division	Hamilton Academical	1–6	Dundee	New Douglas Park, Hamilton
	Imrie 86'	SFL Report	Milne 21', 37', 49'; O'Donnell 39'; Riley 71'; Rae 83'	Attendance: 1,964; Referee: Tumilty

10 December 2011 First Division	Dundee	2–1	Queen of the South	Dens Park, Dundee
	Hyde 8'; Riley 25'; Riley (yellow card) 56' (red card)	BBC Sport	Holt (yellow card) 27' (red card); Higgins 55'	Attendance: 5,019; Referee: Richmond

17 December 2011 First Division	Ross County	1–1	Dundee	Victoria Park, Dingwall
	McMenamin 82'	SFL Report	Milne 35'; O'Donnell (red card) 36'	Attendance: 3,046; Referee: Salmond

26 December 2011 First Division	Dundee	0–1	Greenock Morton	Dens Park, Dundee
		SFL Report	Jackson 22'	Attendance: 5,862; Referee: Beaton

2 January 2012 First Division	Raith Rovers	0–1	Dundee	Stark's Park, Kirkcaldy
		BBC Sport	Hyde 37'	Attendance: 3,629; Referee: Somers

14 January 2012 First Division	Dundee	3–0	Livingston	Dens Park, Dundee
	Conroy 19'; McGregor 74'; Riley 82'	BBC Sport	Fotheringham (yellow card) 76' (yellow-red card)	Attendance: 4,176; Referee: Charleston

21 January 2012 First Division	Partick Thistle	0–0	Dundee	Firhill Stadium, Glasgow
		BBC Sport		Attendance: 2,425; Referee: McKendrick

28 January 2012 First Division	Falkirk	P–P	Dundee	Falkirk Stadium, Falkirk

11 February 2012 First Division	Dundee	2–2	Hamilton Academical	Dens Park, Dundee
	Conroy 53'; Milne 79' (pen.)	SFL Report	McShane 12'; Routledge 85'	Attendance: 4,065; Referee: Salmond

18 February 2012 First Division	Queen of the South	1–1	Dundee	Palmerston Park, Dundee
	Parkin 44'	SFL Report	Lockwood 89'	Attendance: 1,682; Referee: Conroy

21 February 2012 First Division	Falkirk	1–1	Dundee	Falkirk Stadium, Falkirk
	El Alagui 27'	SFL Report	Finnigan 87'	Attendance: 3,089; Referee: Richmond

25 February 2012 First Division	Dundee	1–1	Ross County	Dens Park, Dundee
	Conroy 33' (pen.)	SFL Report	Kettlewell 11'	Attendance: 5,003; Referee: Tumilty

3 March 2012 First Division	Livingston	2–3	Dundee	Braidwood Motor Company Stadium, Livingston
	McNulty 39'; McGregor 46' (o.g.)	SFL Report	McCluskey 26', 88'; Finnigan 56'	Attendance: 2,052; Referee: Madden

13 March 2012 First Division	Dundee	P–P	Ayr United	Dens Park, Dundee
		Dundee Report

17 March 2012 First Division	Greenock Morton	0–2	Dundee	Cappielow Park, Greenock
	Weatherson (red card) 64'	SFL Report	Conroy 15' (pen.), 55'	Attendance: 1,610; Referee: Finnie

20 March 2012 First Division	Hamilton Academical	3–1	Dundee	New Douglas Park, Hamilton
	McLaughlin 35'; McShane 50'; Stewart 56'	SFL Report	Conroy 30' (pen.)	Attendance: 1,366; Referee: Muir

24 March 2012 First Division	Dundee	1–1	Raith Rovers	Dens Park, Dundee
	Finnigan 6'	BBC Sport	Casalinuovo 45'	Attendance: 4,118; Referee: Collum

27 March 2012 First Division	Dundee	4–1	Ayr United	Dens Park, Dundee
	McCluskey 20'; Milne 62'; Conroy 90'; Hyde 90+2'	BBC Sport	Roberts 77'	Attendance: 3,136; Referee: Brines

7 April 2012 First Division	Dundee	3–1	Falkirk	Dens Park, Dundee
	O'Donnell 11'; Conroy 36' (pen.); Milne 57'	SFL Report	Millar 24'	Attendance: 3,896; Referee: Thomson

10 April 2012 First Division	Dundee	1–1	Queen of the South	Dens Park, Dundee
	O'Donnell 53'	Dundee Report	Higgins 82'	Attendance: 3,371; Referee: Beaton

14 April 2012 First Division	Ross County	3–0	Dundee	Victoria Park, Dingwall
	Gardyne 9', 64'; McMenamin 61'; Quinn (yellow card) 80' (red card)	BBC Sport	McBride (red card) 80'	Attendance: 4,350; Referee: McKendrick

21 April 2012 First Division	Dundee	0–3	Partick Thistle	Dens Park, Dundee
	McGregor (red card) 90'	BBC Sport	Cairney 35', 81', 90' (pen.)	Attendance: 3,682; Referee: Clancy

28 April 2012 First Division	Ayr United	3–2	Dundee	Somerset Park, Ayr
	Parker 61', 84'; Robertson 89'	SFL Report	Conroy 14'; Milne 70'	Attendance: 1,656; Referee: Muir

5 May 2012 First Division	Dundee	1–0	Livingston	Dens Park, Dundee
	Reid 48'	BBC Sport		Attendance: 3,675; Referee: Finnie

=== Scottish Cup ===
19 November 2011 Scottish Cup round 3	Stirling Albion	1–2	Dundee	Doubletree Dunblane Stadium, Stirling
	Smith 26'	BBC Sport	Conroy 31'; Milne 61'	Attendance: 1,473; Referee: Salmond

7 January 2012 Scottish Cup round 4	Dundee	1–1	Kilmarnock	Dens Park, Dundee
	Milne 46'	BBC Sport	Pascali 32'	Attendance: 3,446; Referee: O'Reilly

17 January 2012 Scottish Cup round 4 replay	Kilmarnock	2–1	Dundee	Rugby Park, Kilmarnock
	Heffernan 34'; Shiels 43'	BBC Sport	Rae 63'	Attendance: 4,618; Referee: O'Reilly

=== Scottish League Cup ===
30 July 2011 Scottish League Cup round 1	Dumbarton	0–4	Dundee	Strathclyde Homes Stadium, Dumbarton
		BBC Sport	Milne 48', 73'; McCluskey 67'; Lockwood 84' (pen.)	Attendance: 870; Referee: Beaton

23 August 2011 Scottish League Cup round 2	Aberdeen	1–0	Dundee	Pittodrie Stadium, Aberdeen
	Mackie 16'	BBC Sport		Attendance: 5,722; Referee: McKendrick

=== Scottish Challenge Cup ===
23 July 2011 Scottish Challenge Cup round 1	Arbroath	1–2 (a.e.t.)	Dundee	Gayfield Park, Arbroath
	Elfverson 77'	BBC Sport	Milne 79'; O'Donnell 92'	Attendance: 1,761; Referee: Charleston

9 August 2011 Scottish Challenge Cup round 2	Falkirk	1–0	Dundee	Falkirk Stadium, Falkirk
	El Alagui 43'	BBC Sport		Attendance: 1,791; Referee: Winter

== Player statistics ==
=== Captains ===
No.	P	Name	Country	No. games	Notes
	DF	Rhys Weston	(Wales)	30	Club captain

Last updated: 5 May 2012
Source: Competitive match reports.
Competitive matches only
Matches started as captain only
Country: FIFA nationality; No.: Squad number; P: Position; Name: Player name; No. Games: Number of games started as captain.

=== Squad ===
Last updated 5 May 2012

No.	Pos	Nat	Player	Total		Scottish First Division		Scottish Cup		League Cup		Challenge Cup	
No.	Pos	Nat	Player	Apps	Goals	Apps	Goals	Apps	Goals	Apps	Goals	Apps	Goals
	GK	(Scotland) SCO	Rab Douglas	43	0	36+0	0	3+0	0	2+0	0	2+0	0
	GK	(Scotland) SCO	John Gibson	1	0	0+1	0	0+0	0	0+0	0	0+0	0
	DF	(Scotland) SCO	Neil McGregor	31	1	26+1	1	3+0	0	0+0	0	1+0	0
	DF	(Scotland) SCO	Kyle Benedictus	15	0	11+3	0	0+0	0	0+0	0	1+0	0
	DF	(Scotland) SCO	Gary Irvine	43	1	36+0	1	3+0	0	2+0	0	2+0	0
	DF	(England) ENG	Matt Lockwood	41	4	34+0	3	3+0	0	2+0	1	2+0	0
	DF	(Scotland) SCO	Craig McKeown	33	0	23+4	0	2+0	0	2+0	0	1+1	0
	DF	(Scotland) SCO	Connor Rennie	1	0	0+0	0	0+0	0	0+0	0	0+1	0
	DF	(Wales) WAL	Rhys Weston	30	1	20+5	1	1+0	0	2+0	0	2+0	0
	DF	(Scotland) SCO	Ryan Conroy	42	12	32+3	11	3+0	1	2+0	0	2+0	0
	MF	(Scotland) SCO	Steven Masterton	1	0	0+1	0	0+0	0	0+0	0	0+0	0
	MF	(Scotland) SCO	Stephen O'Donnell	40	4	33+0	3	3+0	0	2+0	0	2+0	1
	MF	(Scotland) SCO	Nicky Riley	30	4	20+6	4	1+0	0	1+1	0	1+0	0
	MF	(Scotland) SCO	Graham Webster	1	0	0+0	0	0+0	0	0+0	0	0+1	0
	MF	(Scotland) SCO	Ross Chisholm	24	0	13+5	0	2+1	0	2+0	0	1+0	0
	MF	(Scotland) SCO	Jamie McCluskey	34	4	20+8	3	2+1	0	1+0	1	2+0	0
	MF	(Scotland) SCO	Gavin Rae	16	4	12+1	3	3+0	1	0+0	0	0+0	0
	MF	(Scotland) SCO	Kevin McBride	11	0	11+0	0	0+0	0	0+0	0	0+0	0
	MF	(Scotland) SCO	Mark Fotheringham	8	0	2+6	0	0+0	0	0+0	0	0+0	0
	MF	(Scotland) SCO	Jamie Reid	1	1	1+0	1	0+0	0	0+0	0	0+0	0
	FW	(Scotland) SCO	Leighton Mcintosh	21	1	11+7	1	1+0	0	1+0	0	0+1	0
	FW	(Scotland) SCO	Graham Bayne	20	0	7+11	0	0+1	0	1+0	0	0+0	0
	FW	(Scotland) SCO	Steven Milne	37	16	30+1	11	3+0	2	2+0	2	1+0	1
	FW	(England) ENG	Jake Hyde	31	6	14+12	6	0+1	0	0+2	0	2+0	0
	FW	(Scotland) SCO	Calum Elliot	7	0	1+5	0	0+1	0	0+0	0	0+0	0
	FW	(Scotland) SCO	Carl Finnigan	5	3	4+1	3	0+0	0	0+0	0	0+0	0

=== Disciplinary record ===
Includes all competitive matches.

Last updated 5 May 2012

Nation	Position	Name	Scottish First Division		Scottish Cup		League Cup		Challenge Cup		Total	
Nation	Position	Name	Booked	Sent off (straight red)	Booked	Sent off (straight red)	Booked	Sent off (straight red)	Booked	Sent off (straight red)	Booked	Sent off (straight red)
(Scotland)	GK	Rab Douglas	1	1	0	0	0	0	0	0	1	1
(Scotland)	GK	John Gibson	0	0	0	0	0	0	0	0	0	0
(Scotland)	DF	Neil McGregor	3	1	0	0	0	0	0	0	3	1
(Scotland)	DF	Kyle Benedictus	1	0	0	0	0	0	0	0	1	0
(Scotland)	DF	Gary Irvine	5	0	0	0	0	0	1	0	6	0
(England)	DF	Matt Lockwood	7	0	0	0	0	0	0	0	7	0
(Scotland)	DF	Craig McKeown	7	0	1	0	1	0	0	0	9	0
(Scotland)	DF	Connor Rennie	0	0	0	0	0	0	0	0	0	0
(Wales)	DF	Rhys Weston	6	0	0	0	0	0	0	0	6	0
(Scotland)	DF	Ryan Conroy	0	0	0	0	0	0	1	0	1	0
(Scotland)	MF	Steven Masterton	0	0	0	0	0	0	0	0	0	0
(Scotland)	MF	Stephen O'Donnell	8	2	1	0	1	0	1	0	11	2
(Scotland)	MF	Nicky Riley	4	1	0	0	0	0	0	0	4	1
(Scotland)	MF	Graham Webster	0	0	0	0	0	0	0	0	0	0
(Scotland)	MF	Ross Chisholm	2	0	0	0	0	0	1	0	3	0
(Scotland)	MF	Jamie McCluskey	0	0	0	0	0	0	0	0	0	0
(Scotland)	MF	Gavin Rae	0	0	0	0	0	0	0	0	0	0
(Scotland)	MF	Kevin McBride	3	1	0	0	0	0	0	0	3	1
(Scotland)	MF	Mark Fotheringham	0	0	0	0	0	0	0	0	0	0
(Scotland)	MF	Jamie Reid	0	0	0	0	0	0	0	0	0	0
(Scotland)	FW	Leighton Mcintosh	0	0	0	0	0	0	0	0	0	0
(Scotland)	FW	Graham Bayne	4	0	0	0	0	0	0	0	4	0
(Scotland)	FW	Steven Milne	1	0	0	0	1	0	0	0	2	0
(England)	FW	Jake Hyde	0	0	0	0	0	0	0	0	0	0
(Scotland)	FW	Calum Elliot	1	0	1	0	0	0	0	0	2	0
(Scotland)	FW	Carl Finnigan	0	0	0	0	0	0	0	0	0	0

=== Awards ===
Last updated 5 May 2012

Nation	Name	Award	Month
(Scotland)	Barry Smith	First Division Manager of the Month	November
(Scotland)	Nicky Riley	Player of the Month	November

== League table ==
Pos	Team	Pld	W	D	L	GF	GA	GD	Pts	Promotion, qualification or relegation
1	Ross County (C, P)	36	22	13	1	72	32	+40	79	Promotion to the Premier League
2	Dundee (P)	36	15	10	11	53	43	+10	55 (Note: Dundee were chosen to take the place of Rangers.)	Promotion to the Premier League
3	Falkirk	36	13	13	10	53	48	+5	52	
4	Hamilton Academical	36	14	7	15	55	56	−1	49	
5	Livingston	36	13	9	14	56	54	+2	48	

Source: SPFL Archive
Rules for classification: 1) points; 2) goal difference; 3) number of goals scored.
(C) Champions; (P) Promoted

== Transfers ==
=== Players in ===
Player	From	Fee
(Scotland) Graham Bayne	(Scotland) Dunfermline Athletic	Free
(Scotland) Ryan Conroy	(Scotland) Celtic	Free
(Scotland) Steven Milne	(Scotland) Ross County	Free
(England) Jake Hyde	(Scotland) Dunfermline Athletic	Free
(Scotland) Ross Chisholm	(Scotland) Arbroath	Free
(Scotland) Neil McGregor	(Scotland) Dunfermline Athletic	Free
(Scotland) Jamie McCluskey	(Scotland) St Mirren	Free
(Scotland) Gavin Rae	(Wales) Cardiff City	Free
(Scotland) Calum Elliot	(Scotland) Heart of Midlothian	Loan
(Scotland) Carl Finnigan	(Scotland) St Johnstone	Loan
(Scotland) Mark Fotheringham	(Scotland) Livingston	Free
(Scotland) Kevin McBride	(Scotland) Hamilton Academical	Free

=== Players out ===
Player	To	Fee
(Scotland) Sean Higgins	(Scotland) St Johnstone	Free
(Scotland) Craig Forsyth	(England) Watford	Free
(Scotland) Gary Harkins	(Scotland) Kilmarnock	Undisclosed
(Scotland) Ross Carnegie	(Scotland) Broughty Athletic	Free
(Scotland) Gary Bartlett	Free Agent	Free
(Scotland) Alan Tulleth	(Scotland) St Andrews United	Free
(Scotland) Gary Irons	(Scotland) Lochee United	Free
(Scotland) Michael Hutcheon	Free Agent	Free
(Scotland) Graham Webster	(Scotland) Peterhead	Loan
(Scotland) Gavin Rae	(Scotland) Aberdeen	Free
(Scotland) Connor Rennie	(Scotland) Deveronvale	Undisclosed
(Wales) Rhys Weston	(Iceland) KR Reykjavik	Free

== See also ==
- List of Dundee F.C. seasons
