= Kyle De Silva =

English footballer

Personal information
- Full name: Kyle Matthew De Silva
- Date of birth: 29 November 1993 (age 32)
- Place of birth: Croydon, England
- Height: 1.70 m (5 ft 7 in)
- Position: Attacking midfielder

Team information
- Current team: Sevenoaks Town

Youth career
- 2005–2010: Crystal Palace

Senior career*
Years	Team	Apps	(Gls)
2010–2015	Crystal Palace	7	(0)
2013	→ Barnet (loan)	3	(0)
2015–2016	Notts County	4	(0)
2016–2018	FC Eindhoven	49	(4)
2018–2019	Bromley	4	(0)
2019	→ Canvey Island (loan)	2	(0)
2019	→ Sevenoaks Town (loan)	3	(0)
2019–	Sevenoaks Town	50	(9)
- * Club domestic league appearances and goals as of 20:04, 16 May 2024 (UTC)

Kyle Matthew De Silva (born 29 November 1993) is an English footballer who plays as an attacking midfielder for Sevenoaks Town.

== Career ==
=== Crystal Palace ===
De Silva is a product of the Crystal Palace academy and possesses pace and quick feet. In April 2010, De Silva signed his first professional contract. He made his début in the FA Cup against Derby County on 7 January 2012 and made his league début away to Blackpool on 21 January 2012. In May 2012, he signed a three-year contract with Palace.

During the 2012–13 season, de Silva suffered a series of injuries which kept him out of action for half a year. On 22 March 2013 he signed for Barnet on loan until the end of the season. He made his debut as a 66th-minute substitute for Luke Gambin in a 0–0 home draw with Cheltenham Town.

On 8 May 2015, it was announced that de Silva would not be offered a new contract by Crystal Palace and would be leaving the club. It was believed that injuries and a loss of form were the main factors in de Silva's release by the club.

=== Notts County ===
After being released by Crystal Palace, de Silva joined League Two side Notts County on a two-year contract. He made 6 appearances for the Magpies before having his contract terminated by mutual consent.

=== FC Eindhoven ===
De Silva joined Eerste Divisie side FC Eindhoven for the 2016–17 season. He scored 4 goals in 49 appearances for the Dutch team.

=== Bromley ===
In June 2018, de Silva signed for National League side Bromley. He made his first appearance as an 87th minute substitute for Omar Bugiel in a 2–0 away loss to Salford. After only four appearances for the club, de Silva was loaned to Canvey Island and Sevenoaks Town. De Silva left Bromley at the end of the 2018–19 season.

=== Later career ===
De Silva joined Sevenoaks Town permanently for the 2019–20 season.
