= Melvin Holwijn =

Dutch footballer (born 1980)

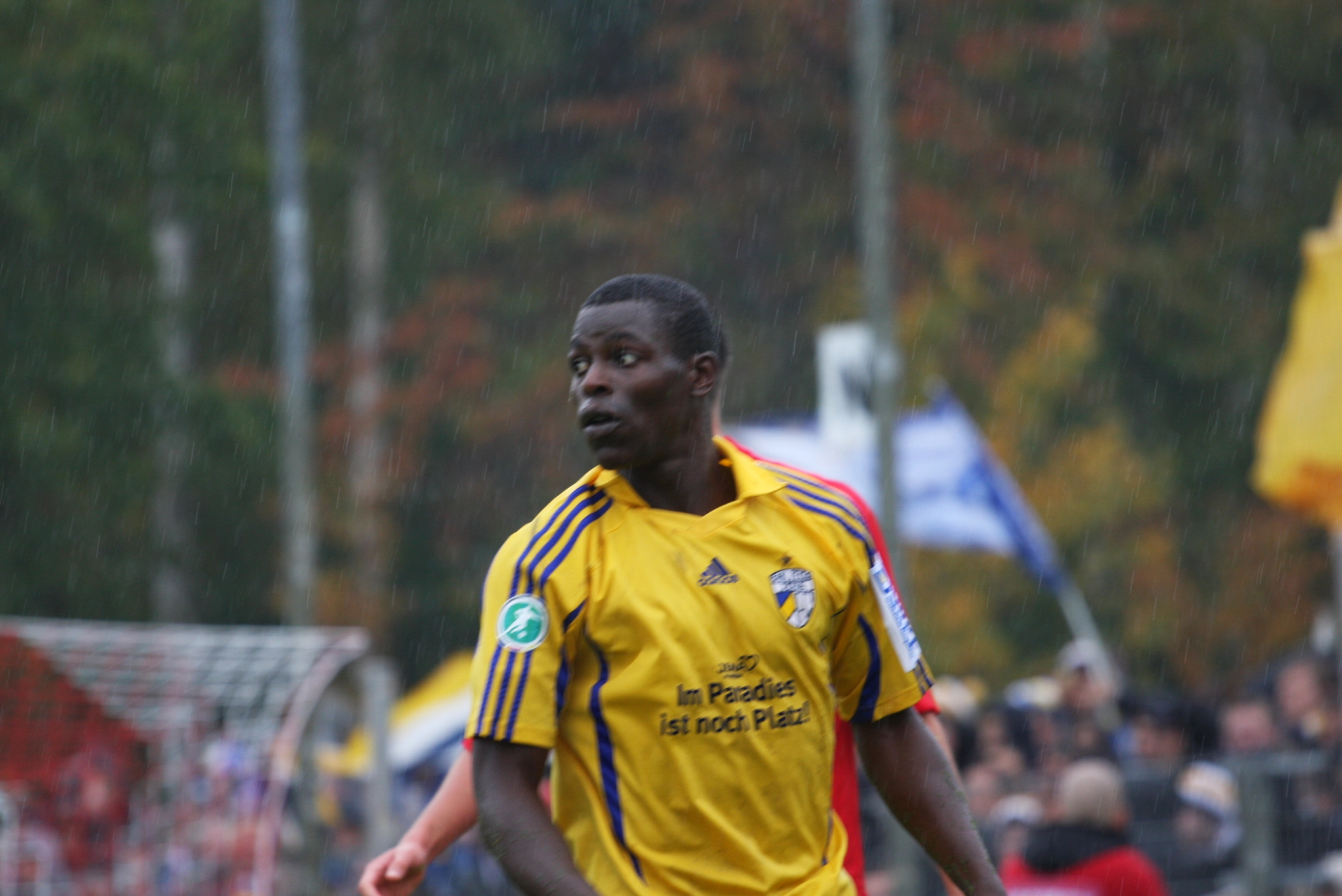
- Melvin Holwijn, Dutch football player, 2009

Personal information
- Full name: Melvin Holwijn
- Date of birth: 2 January 1980 (age 46)
- Place of birth: Amsterdam, Netherlands
- Height: 1.76 m (5 ft 9 1/2 in)
- Positions: Winger; forward

Youth career
- DCG
- Abcoude
- Ajax
- Zeeburgia
- Telstar

Senior career*
Years	Team	Apps	(Gls)
1998–2001	Telstar	71	(13)
2001–2003	Stormvogels Telstar	57	(24)
2003–2004	Iraklis	17	(0)
2005–2006	Cambuur	39	(4)
2006–2009	Stormvogels Telstar	83	(21)
2009–2010	Carl Zeiss Jena	18	(3)
2010–2012	Telstar	36	(2)
2012	Lisse	0	(0)
2012	Blauw-Wit		
2012–2013	Barnet	1	(0)
2013	Blauw-Wit		
2014	SV Hoofddorp		
2014–2024	ASV Arsenal		
Total		322	(67)
- * Club domestic league appearances and goals as of 22:58, 9 July 2015 (UTC)

Melvin Holwijn (born 2 January 1980) is a Dutch retired football player who played as a winger.

== Career ==
Holwijn was born in Amsterdam, and played in his youth for DCG, FC Abcoude, and Jong Ajax. He joined than from A.V.V. Zeeburgia to Telstar, who were promoted in July 1998. After five years with Telstar, Holwijn left the Netherlands and signed for the Greek club Iraklis. He played in Greece for 18 months and, in January 2005, returned to the Netherlands signed to SC Cambuur. After another one and a half years, he left Cambuur and returned to his former club Telstar, becoming their second highest goalscorer of all time with 60 goals. He had a trial at Scottish Football League club Inverness Caledonian Thistle in summer 2009, but was not offered a contract. On 21 August 2009, he left Telstar and signed a one-year contract with FC Carl Zeiss Jena.

After a very brief spell with FC Lisse, he joined amateur club Blauw-Wit Amsterdam in the summer of 2012. In November 2012, he signed for Barnet on a one-month contract, where Holwijn's former manager at Blauw-Wit, Ulrich Landvreugd, was assistant manager to Edgar Davids, and made his début on 8 December against AFC Wimbledon as an 83rd-minute substitute for George Barker. This was the only appearance he made for the club, and he was released in January 2013. Afterwards, he re-joined Blauw-Wit. He finished his career at fellow amateurs ASV Arsenal, where he later became head of the academy.
