= Jordan Brown (footballer, born 1991) =

English footballer

Personal information
- Date of birth: 11 October 1991 (age 35)
- Place of birth: Benfleet, England
- Position: Left-back

Youth career
- 1998–2010: West Ham United

Senior career*
Years	Team	Apps	(Gls)
2010–2012	West Ham United	0	(0)
2011	→ Aldershot Town (loan)	3	(0)
2012	Crewe Alexandra	7	(0)
2012–2014	Barnet	24	(0)
2014	Bishop's Stortford	7	(0)
2014–2015	Boreham Wood	18	(0)
2015	Hemel Hempstead Town	3	(0)
2015	Whitehawk	1	(0)
2015–2016	Dulwich Hamlet	27	(1)
2016–2017	Welling United	34	(0)
2016	→ Concord Rangers (loan)	6	(0)
2017–2018	Concord Rangers	41	(0)
2018–2019	Canvey Island	28	(0)
2019–2020	East Thurrock United	25	(0)
2020	Bishop's Stortford	2	(0)
2022	Great Wakering Rovers	7	(1)
- * Club domestic league appearances and goals as of 21:00, 11 October 2020 (UTC)

Jordan Brown (born 11 October 1991) is an English footballer who plays as a left-back. A former West Ham United youth player, Brown has played on loan with Aldershot and completed a short-term contract with Crewe Alexandra, as well as playing for Barnet for over two seasons, Boreham Wood, Whitehawk, Dulwich Hamlet, Welling United, Concord Rangers, Canvey Island and East Thurrock United.

== Early life ==
He played football as a schoolboy for Kingdown Rangers in his hometown of Benfleet and was spotted playing in an under-8 team.

== Career ==
Brown joined West Ham as a youth team player for the 2007–08 season. He signed his first professional contract, with West Ham, in the summer of 2010. In August 2011 he signed a one-month loan deal with Aldershot Town. Brown made his debut on 3 September 2011 in a 1–0 home win against Cheltenham Town. Brown was released by West Ham in January 2012.

On 27 February 2012 Brown signed for Crewe Alexandra on a one-month contract.

On 27 June 2012 Brown signed for League Two side Barnet. He started the 2012–13 season as first choice, but lost his place to Elliot Johnson, making 25 appearances in all competitions that season. In 2013–14, following Barnet's relegation to the Conference Premier, Brown had dropped to third choice behind Johnson and Mauro Vilhete, making only three further appearances, before being released on 24 February 2014. Upon leaving the club, he said "Even though I've not played as much football as I would have liked I've enjoyed my time at Barnet Football Club... I'm at a stage in my career where I need to be playing regularly and because of the club's excellent strength in depth it's not been possible at The Hive." Brown joined Bishop's Stortford four days later. In September 2014, Brown had trials with Luton Town. Although the Hatters decided not to sign Brown, they helped facilitate a move to Boreham Wood for him, signing on 3 October 2014.

Brown made one appearance for Whitehawk against Bath City on 15 August 2015, before moving to Dulwich Hamlet towards the end of September 2015, making his debut in a 3–1 Isthmian League Premier away win over Metropolitan Police on 29 September 2015.

After finishing the 2015–16 season with Dulwich, making 36 appearances in all competitions for the club, Brown joined Welling United ahead of the 2016–17 season. He joined Concord Rangers on loan in October 2016, where he made six appearances. Brown joined the Beachboys permanently for the 2017–18 season. He then joined Canvey Island for 2018–19. The following season he joined East Thurrock United. He then joined Bishop's Stortford.

== Personal life ==
Brown is a cousin of Fulham footballer Kieran Richardson.

== Career statistics ==
As of end of 2021–22 season

Appearances and goals by club, season and competition
Club	Season	League			FA Cup		League Cup		Other		Total	
Club	Season	Division	Apps	Goals	Apps	Goals	Apps	Goals	Apps	Goals	Apps	Goals
Aldershot Town (loan)	2011–12	League Two	3	0	0	0	1	0	0	0	4	0
Crewe Alexandra	2011–12	League Two	7	0	0	0	—		0	0	7	0
Barnet	2012–13	League Two	21	0	1	0	1	0	1 (Note: Appearance in the Football League Trophy)	0	24	0
Barnet	2013–14	Conference Premier	3	0	0	0	—		0	0	3	0
Barnet	Barnet total		24	0	1	0	1	0	1	0	27	0
Bishops Stortford	2013–14	Conference South	7	0	0	0	—		2 (Note: One appearance in the Hertfordshire Charity Cup and one in the Herts Senior Cup)	0	9	0
Boreham Wood	2014–15	Conference South	18	0	3	0	—		3 (Note: One appearance in the FA Trophy and two in the Herts Senior Cup)	0	24	0
Hemel Hempstead Town	2014–15	Conference South	3	0	0	0	—		0	0	3	0
Whitehawk	2015–16	National League South	1	0	0	0	—		0	0	1	0
Dulwich Hamlet	2015–16	Isthmian League Premier Division	27	1			—		9	0	36	1
Welling United	2016–17	National League South	34	0	2	0	—		8 (Note: One appearance in the London Senior Cup, three in the Kent Senior Cup and four in the FA Trophy)	0	44	0
Concord Rangers (loan)	2016–17	National League South	6	0	—		—		0	0	6	0
Concord Rangers	2017–18	National League South	41	0	2	0	—		0	0	43	0
Canvey Island	2018–19	Isthmian League North Division	28	0	1	0	—		3 (Note: One appearance in the Alan Turvey Trophy, two in the FA Trophy)	0	32	0
East Thurrock United	2019–20	Isthmian League Premier Division	25	0	2	0	—		5	0	32	0
Bishop's Stortford	2020–21	Isthmian League Premier Division	2	0	0	0	—		0	0	1	0
Great Wakering Rovers	2021–22	Isthmian League North Division	7	1	0	0	—		0	0	7	1
Career total			234	2	11	0	2	0	31	0	277	2
