= Anthony Edgar =

English footballer (born 1990)

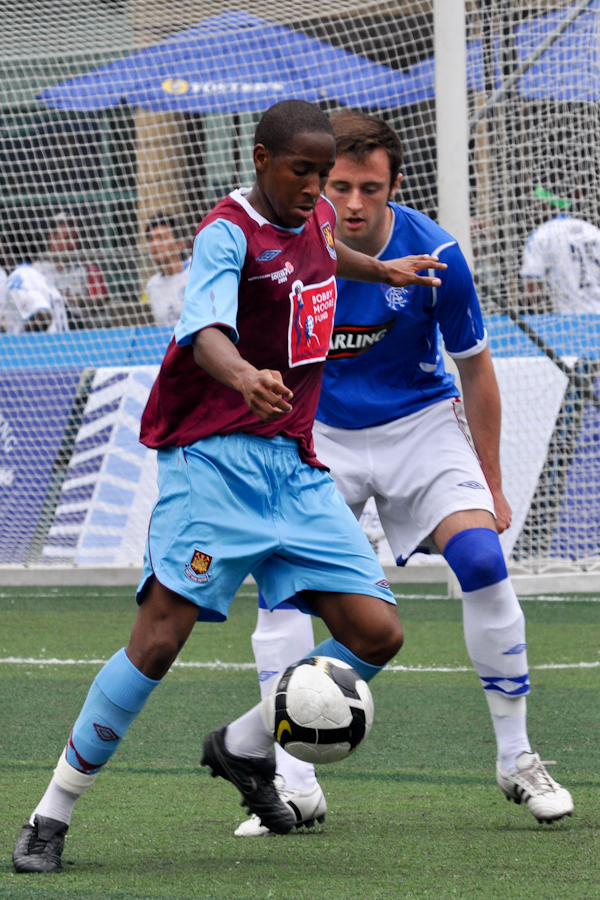
- Edgar playing for West Ham United in 2009

Personal information
- Date of birth: 30 September 1990 (age 36)
- Place of birth: Newham, England
- Height: 1.78 m (5 ft 10 in)
- Position: Winger

Team information
- Current team: Ashford United

Youth career
- 2006–2009: West Ham United

Senior career*
Years	Team	Apps	(Gls)
2009–2011	West Ham United	0	(0)
2009	→ Bournemouth (loan)	3	(0)
2011–2012	Yeovil Town	10	(1)
2012–2013	Barnet	11	(1)
2013–2014	Dagenham & Redbridge	7	(0)
2014–2015	Triestina	0	(0)
2015	Bishop's Stortford	7	(3)
2015–2016	Braintree Town	21	(2)
2016–2017	Woking	17	(1)
2017	Hayes & Yeading United	16	(1)
2018–2020	Cray Valley Paper Mills	55	(24)
2020–2021	Herne Bay	11	(1)
2021–2022	FC Romania	21	(3)
2022–2023	Cray Valley Paper Mills	13	(2)
2023–	Ashford United	0	(0)
- * Club domestic league appearances and goals as of 18:26, 11 September 2023 (UTC)

Anthony James Edgar (born 30 September 1990) is an English footballer who plays as a winger for Ashford United.

== Career ==
Edgar is a product of West Ham's youth team and scored his first career goal for West Ham United on 14 July 2010 in a pre-season friendly against Peterborough United. Replacing Junior Stanislas as an 88th-minute substitute, Edgar made his first-team debut for West Ham on 3 January 2010 in their 2–1 home defeat to Arsenal in the FA Cup third round.

Edgar signed for Bournemouth on 1 October 2009 on a one-month loan from West Ham. He made his professional, Bournemouth and Football League debut on 3 October 2009 in a 0–0 away draw against Port Vale. Although Bournemouth wanted to extend his loan for a second month the Football League blocked their request and Edgar returned to West Ham at the end of October after only four appearances.

Edgar was released by West Ham in June 2011. In July 2011 he signed for Yeovil Town on a two-year contract. Edgar made his debut against Exeter City in the 2–0 loss, and scored his first goal against Preston North End in the 4–3 loss. He was released at the end of the 2011–12 season.

After a successful trial, Edgar signed for Barnet in July 2012. He made his debut against Birmingham City on 14 August in the Football League Cup, playing the full 90 minutes. His first goal for the Bees came in a 4–0 win over Northampton Town on 19 October. His contract at Barnet was terminated by mutual consent on 12 April 2013, having not played for the club since November.

On 14 November 2013, Edgar signed for Dagenham & Redbridge on non-contract terms. After making seven appearances for Dagenham, all as a substitute, Edgar was released in January 2014.

Edgar signed for Italian Serie D side Triestina on 17 July 2014, but did not make any appearances during his time in Italy due to complications with his contract.

Edgar joined Braintree Town on a contract until the end of the season, in August 2015.

On 5 August 2016, Anthony went on to sign for Woking, agreeing a one-year contract just in time for the start of the season. On 13 August 2016, Edgar made his Woking debut in a 2–1 away defeat against Southport, replacing Zak Ansah with eight minutes remaining. A week later, Edgar scored his first Woking goal in a 3–1 home defeat against Dagenham & Redbridge, netting in the 48th minute.

On 7 January 2017, in a post-match interview, manager Garry Hill confirmed Edgar had been released.

Preceding his release from Woking, Edgar joined Southern League Premier Division side Hayes & Yeading United. On 29 January 2017, Edgar made his Hayes & Yeading United debut in a 2–1 home defeat against Kettering Town. A month later, Edgar scored his first goal for Hayes & Yeading in their Southern League Cup semi-final tie against Salisbury, featuring for 88 minutes before being replaced by Matt Sinclair in the 4–0 victory. On 7 March 2017, Edgar scored the equaliser in Hayes & Yeading's 2–1 defeat against Dorchester Town, however, he was later sent off in the 56th minute.

For the 2018–19 season, Edgar signed for Cray Valley Paper Mills. On 22 January 2020, the club announced Edgar's departure. Edgar joined Herne Bay later that month, scoring on his debut.

Edgar joined FC Romania for the 2021–22 season and scored on his debut. Later in the season he re-joined Cray Valley PM.

In September 2023, Edgar joined Ashford United.

== Personal life ==
He is a cousin of Jermain Defoe, and his brother, Ryan is a Dominica international who plays non-League football.

== Career statistics ==
As of match played 14 August 2021.

Appearances and goals by club, season and competition
Club	Season	League			FA Cup		League Cup		Other		Total	
Club	Season	Division	Apps	Goals	Apps	Goals	Apps	Goals	Apps	Goals	Apps	Goals
West Ham United	2009–10	Premier League	0	0	1	0	0	0	—		1	0
West Ham United	2010–11	Premier League	0	0	1	0	0	0	—		1	0
West Ham United	Total		0	0	2	0	0	0	—		2	0
Bournemouth (loan)	2009–10	League Two	3	0	—		—		1 (Note: Appearance(s) in Football League Trophy)	0	4	0
Yeovil Town	2011–12	League One	10	1	0	0	1	0	1	0	12	1
Barnet	2012–13	League Two	11	1	0	0	1	0	1	0	13	1
Dagenham & Redbridge	2013–14	League Two	7	0	—		—		—		7	0
Bishop's Stortford	2014–15	Conference South	7	3	—		—		—		7	3
Braintree Town	2015–16	National League	21	2	0	0	—		1 (Note: Appearance(s) in FA Trophy)	0	22	2
Woking	2016–17	National League	17	1	3	1	—		1	0	21	2
Hayes & Yeading United	2016–17	SFL Premier Division	16	1	—		—		3 (Note: Appearance(s) in Southern League Cup)	2	19	3
Cray Valley Paper Mills	2018–19	SCEL Premier Division	37	23	4	2	—		10 (Note: Appearance(s) in FA Vase)	2	51	27
Cray Valley Paper Mills	2019–20	Isthmian League South East Division	18	1	2	1	—		4	1	24	3
Cray Valley Paper Mills	Total		55	24	6	3	—		14	3	75	30
Herne Bay	2019–20	Isthmian League South East Division	7	1	—		—		—		7	1
Herne Bay	2020–21	Isthmian League South East Division	4	0	1	0	—		1	1	6	1
Herne Bay	Total		11	1	1	0	—		1	1	13	2
FC Romania	2021–22	SFL Division One Central	21	3	2	0	—		3	0	26	3
Cray Valley Paper Mills	2021–22	Isthmian League South East Division	5	2	0	0	—		0	0	5	2
Career total			184	39	14	4	2	0	26	6	226	49
