= Luke Gambin =

Maltese footballer

Personal information
- Full name: Luke David Gambin
- Date of birth: 16 March 1993 (age 33)
- Place of birth: Sutton, London, England
- Height: 5 ft 6 in (1.68 m)
- Position: Winger

Team information
- Current team: Cobham

Youth career
- AFC Wimbledon
- 2009–2011: Barnet

Senior career*
Years	Team	Apps	(Gls)
2011–2017	Barnet	124	(15)
2011–2012	→ Hemel Hempstead Town (loan)	4	(0)
2012	→ Hendon (loan)	2	(0)
2017–2019	Luton Town	29	(2)
2018–2019	→ Crawley Town (loan)	26	(3)
2019–2021	Colchester United	39	(1)
2021	→ Newport County (loan)	11	(1)
2021–2022	Ħamrun Spartans	25	(2)
2022–2023	Sutton United	5	(0)
2023–2024	Hayes & Yeading United	22	(1)
2025–2026	Burgess Hill Town	13	(0)
2026–	Cobham	2	(0)

International career^{‡}
2016–2022	Malta	36	(1)
- * Club domestic league appearances and goals as of 20:16, 19 September 2026 (UTC) ‡ National team caps and goals as of 21:24, 12 August 2024 (UTC)

Luke David Gambin (born 16 March 1993) is a professional footballer who plays as a winger for Cobham. Born in England, he represents the Malta national team.

In 2025, Gambin became a player in the 1st season of the Baller League UK, a six-a-side indoor football competition. He was chosen to play for Wembley Rangers AFC, a team which is run by Ian Wright and Chloe Kelly.

== Club career ==
=== Barnet ===
Born in Sutton, London, Gambin began his career in the youth system at AFC Wimbledon before moving to Barnet as an apprentice in 2009. He made his first-team debut in a 4–0 win at home to former club AFC Wimbledon on 28 April 2012, coming on as a late substitute for Scott McGleish, before signing his first professional contract in the summer of 2012. Gambin made his first appearance of 2012–13 after being introduced as a 66th-minute substitute in a 3–0 defeat away to Bradford City on 15 September 2012. He found first-team opportunities limited, joining Isthmian League Premier Division club Hendon on loan in November 2012, and debuted as a substitute in a 2–1 defeat away to Aldershot Town in the FA Cup first round. He completed the loan spell with three appearances. Gambin broke into the Barnet first-team towards the end of the season and scored his first goal for the club in a 4–1 win at home to Morecambe on 9 March 2013. He finished the season with two goals from 10 appearances, but was unable to help Barnet prevent relegation to the Conference Premier.

Gambin signed a new long-term contract with Barnet a little more than a week before the start of 2013–14. He scored Barnet's first goal in a 3–0 win at home to Chester on the opening day of the season and finished 2013–14 with one goal from 25 appearances. Gambin scored four goals in 26 league appearances for Barnet in 2014–15 as the club won the Conference Premier title and therefore promotion to League Two. After the end of the season, Barnet took up the option to extend Gambin's contract. In Barnet's first season back in the Football League, Gambin scored four goals in 49 appearances, as they finished 15th in League Two.

He made his first appearance of 2016–17 in the starting lineup away to Cambridge United on the opening day of the season, which finished as a 1–1 draw. Barnet accepted a bid in excess of £100,000 from Leyton Orient for Gambin in August 2016, but he rejected the opportunity and instead stayed with the club. His first goal of the season came on 8 October 2016 against Doncaster Rovers, when he scored a late equaliser in the 86th minute to make the score 2–2, although Barnet went on to lose 3–2. After four goals from 21 appearances, Gambin was transfer listed after he rejected an offer of a new contract for the fourth time.

=== Luton Town ===
Gambin signed for League Two club Luton Town on 16 January 2017 on a two-and-a-half-year contract for an undisclosed fee, with the option of a further year. He made his debut five days later, starting in Luton's 1–1 draw away to Wycombe Wanderers. Gambin scored his first goal for Luton with the second goal in a 3–0 victory at home to Hartlepool United on 14 February. He was an unused substitute in both legs of their 6–5 aggregate play-off semi-final defeat to Blackpool, and finished 2016–17 with 17 appearances and one goal.

He joined League Two club Crawley Town on 31 August 2018 on loan until the end of 2018–19. Gambin was released by Luton when his contract expired at the end of the 2018–19 season.

=== Colchester United ===
Gambin signed for League Two club Colchester United on 26 June 2019 on a two-year contract, effective from 1 July. He made his club debut as a substitute for Jevani Brown in Colchester's 1–1 home draw with Port Vale on 3 August. He scored his first goal for the club on 29 October 2019 in Colchester's 3–1 EFL Cup victory against his former club Crawley Town.

He joined Colchester's divisional rivals Newport County on 20 January 2021 on loan until the end of the season. His debut came three days later in a 3–2 away defeat to Oldham Athletic, in which he scored Newport's second goal.

=== Ħamrun Spartans ===
Gambin signed for Ħamrun Spartans in July 2021.

=== Sutton United ===
On 16 July 2022, Gambin returned to England to join League Two club Sutton United having already featured in friendlies across pre-season. He was released at the end of the 2022–23 season.

=== Hayes & Yeading ===
On 25 November 2023, Gambin signed for Southern League South Premier club Hayes & Yeading United. He made his debut the against Swindon Supermarine in which he scored.

=== Burgess Hill Town ===
In October 2025, Gambin joined Isthmian League Premier Division club Burgess Hill Town.

== International career ==
Gambin is of Maltese descent and joined the Malta squad for training in June 2015. His application for Maltese citizenship was successful and he was called up to the national team in May 2016. He debuted later that week, starting in a 6–0 friendly defeat to the Czech Republic. Gambin scored his first international goal in a 2–2 draw with Slovakia in a 2022 FIFA World Cup qualification match on 27 March 2021.

== Career statistics ==
=== Club ===
As of match played end of 2023–24 season

Appearances and goals by club, season and competition
Club	Season	League			FA Cup		League Cup		Other		Total	
Club	Season	Division	Apps	Goals	Apps	Goals	Apps	Goals	Apps	Goals	Apps	Goals
Barnet	2011–12	League Two	1	0	0	0	0	0	0	0	1	0
Barnet	2012–13	League Two	10	2	—		0	0	0	0	10	2
Barnet	2013–14	Conference Premier	24	1	0	0	—		1 (Note: Appearance(s) in FA Trophy)	0	25	1
Barnet	2014–15	Conference Premier	26	4	2	0	—		2	0	30	4
Barnet	2015–16	League Two	44	4	2	0	2	0	1 (Note: Appearance in Football League Trophy)	0	49	4
Barnet	2016–17	League Two	19	4	1	0	1	0	0	0	21	4
Barnet	Total		124	15	5	0	3	0	4	0	136	15
Hemel Hempstead Town (loan)	2011–12	Southern League Premier Division	4	0	—		—		1 (Note: Appearance in Southern League Cup)	1	5	1
Hendon (loan)	2012–13	Isthmian League Premier Division	2	0	1	0	—		—		3	0
Luton Town	2016–17	League Two	16	1	—		—		1 (Note: Appearance(s) in EFL Trophy)	0	17	1
Luton Town	2017–18	League Two	13	1	2	0	1	0	4	1	20	2
Luton Town	2018–19	League One	0	0	—		1	0	0	0	1	0
Luton Town	Total		29	2	2	0	2	0	5	1	38	3
Crawley Town (loan)	2018–19	League Two	26	3	2	0	—		0	0	28	3
Colchester United	2019–20	League Two	28	1	1	0	5	1	3 (Note: One appearance in EFL Trophy, two in League Two play-offs)	0	37	2
Colchester United	2020–21	League Two	11	0	0	0	0	0	2	0	13	0
Colchester United	Total		39	1	1	0	5	1	5	0	50	2
Newport County (loan)	2020–21	League Two	11	1	—		—		—		11	1
Ħamrun Spartans	2021–22	Maltese Premier League	25	2	3	0	—		—		28	2
Sutton United	2022–23	League Two	5	0	1	0	1	0	3	0	10	0
Hayes & Yeading United	2023–24	Southern League Premier Division South	22	1	0	0	—		3 (Note: Appearance(s) in Middlesex Senior Cup)	0	25	1
Career total			287	25	15	0	11	1	21	2	334	27

=== International ===
As of match played 20 November 2022

Appearances and goals by national team and year
National team	Year	Apps	Goals
Malta
Malta	2016	6	0
Malta	2017	7	0
Malta	2018	4	0
Malta	2019	5	0
Malta	2020	6	0
Malta	2021	4	1
Malta	2022	4	0
Total		36	1

As of match played 30 March 2021. Malta score listed first, score column indicates score after each Gambin goal.

List of international goals scored by Luke Gambin
No.	Date	Venue	Cap	Opponent	Score	Result	Competition	Ref.
1	27 March 2021	Anton Malatinský Stadium, Trnava, Slovakia	27	Slovakia	1–0	2–2	2022 FIFA World Cup qualification	

== Honours ==
Barnet

- Conference Premier: 2014–15

Luton Town

- EFL League Two runner-up: 2017–18
