= Freddie Warren (footballer, born 1992) =

English footballer

Personal information
- Full name: Freddie Robert Warren
- Date of birth: 2 November 1992 (age 34)
- Place of birth: Barking, England
- Position: Midfielder

Youth career
- 2009–2011: Charlton Athletic

Senior career*
Years	Team	Apps	(Gls)
2011–2012	Charlton Athletic	0	(0)
2011	→ Staines Town (loan)	2	(0)
2011	→ Concord Rangers (loan)		
2011	→ Kettering Town (loan)	1	(0)
2011–2012	→ Bromley (loan)	8	(0)
2012	→ Hayes & Yeading United (loan)	7	(0)
2012–2014	Barnet	4	(0)
2013	→ Hastings United (loan)	8	(0)
2013	→ Canvey Island (loan)	6	(0)
2014–2015	Canvey Island	2	(0)
2015	East Thurrock United	0	(0)
- * Club domestic league appearances and goals as of 19:33, 1 January 2016 (UTC)

Freddie Robert Warren (born 2 November 1992) is an English footballer who plays as a midfielder.

== Career ==
Warren began his career at Charlton Athletic, and was given a professional contract in March 2011. After several loan spells away from the club, he was released at the end of the 2011–12 season and joined Barnet, where he made his debut against Birmingham City in the Football League Cup on 14 August 2012. He joined Hastings United on loan on 28 March 2013, making eight appearances, but was unable to save them from relegation from the Isthmian Premier Division. On 21 September 2013, he joined Canvey Island on loan for a month. Warren was released by the Bees at the end of the 2013–14 season, playing only five times in his two seasons at the club. Manager Martin Allen said: "I am currently undecided on Freddie. He has done well in both games he has played but at 21 he needs to be playing regular football which I cannot guarantee him. He has a terrific attitude but is at a crossroads because of his age in terms of what direction he should go in".

Warren signed for Canvey Island permanently on 6 June 2014. He joined East Thurrock United in November 2015.
