= Sam Cowler =

English footballer

Personal information
- Full name: Samuel Paul Cowler
- Date of birth: 26 October 1992 (age 34)
- Place of birth: Colchester, England
- Position: Goalkeeper

Youth career
- –2009: Frinton & Walton YFC
- 2009–2012: West Ham United
- 2009: → Wycombe Wanderers (loan)
- 2011: → Queens Park Rangers (loan)
- 2011: → Yeovil Town (loan)
- 2012: → Barnet (loan)

Senior career*
Years	Team	Apps	(Gls)
2012–2013	Barnet	2	(0)
2013–2014	Bishop's Stortford	6	(0)
2013	→ Needham Market (loan)	1	(0)
2014–2015	Barnet	0	(0)
2015	Heybridge Swifts	15	(0)
2016	Brightlingsea Regent	18	(0)
2016	Braintree Town	0	(0)
2016–2017	Brightlingsea Regent	38	(0)
2018–2019	Aveley	1	(0)
2022	Brightlingsea Town	2	(0)
- * Club domestic league appearances and goals as of 20:45, 31 January 2022 (UTC)

Samuel Paul Cowler (born 26 October 1992) is a retired English footballer who played as a goalkeeper.

== Career ==
Cowler played for Frinton & Walton YFC before signing a youth scholarship with West Ham United in 2009. He then spent time on loan with the youth teams of Wycombe Wanderers, Queens Park Rangers, Yeovil Town and Barnet before being released in May 2012, his only appearance in a first team squad coming when he was on the bench for a Football League Cup game against Aldershot Town on 24 August 2011. Having previously spent time on loan in their youth team, in June 2012 he signed for Barnet. Cowler made his debut for Barnet on 29 September 2012 in a 2–1 away defeat to Fleetwood Town, coming on as a 24th minute replacement for Ahmed Abdulla as a result of first choice goalkeeper Graham Stack being sent off.

In July 2013, Cowler announced his departure from Barnet on Twitter, as he wanted first-team football and was unable to displace the reliable Graham Stack as first choice. The following month, he signed for Bishop's Stortford on a one-year deal.

Cowler re-joined Barnet on a one-year deal on 4 August 2014, once again as backup to Stack. Cowler's only appearances in the 2014–15 season came in an FA Trophy tie against Concord Rangers and the subsequent replay defeat, but he was still awarded a league winner's medal following a successful season for the Bees. At the end of the season he left the Bees, again to seek first-team football.

Cowler then signed for Isthmian League side Heybridge Swifts in August 2015, before joining Brightlingsea Regent in January 2016.

Cowler joined Braintree Town for the 2016–17 season but left shortly afterwards to coach in China. He then re-joined Brightlingsea Regent. Cowler joined Aveley in August 2018.

On 31 January 2022, Essex and Suffolk Border League club Brightlingsea Town announced the signing of Cowler.

== Honours ==
Barnet

- Conference Premier
  - Champions: 2014–15
