= Ahmed Abdulla =

Saudi Arabian footballer

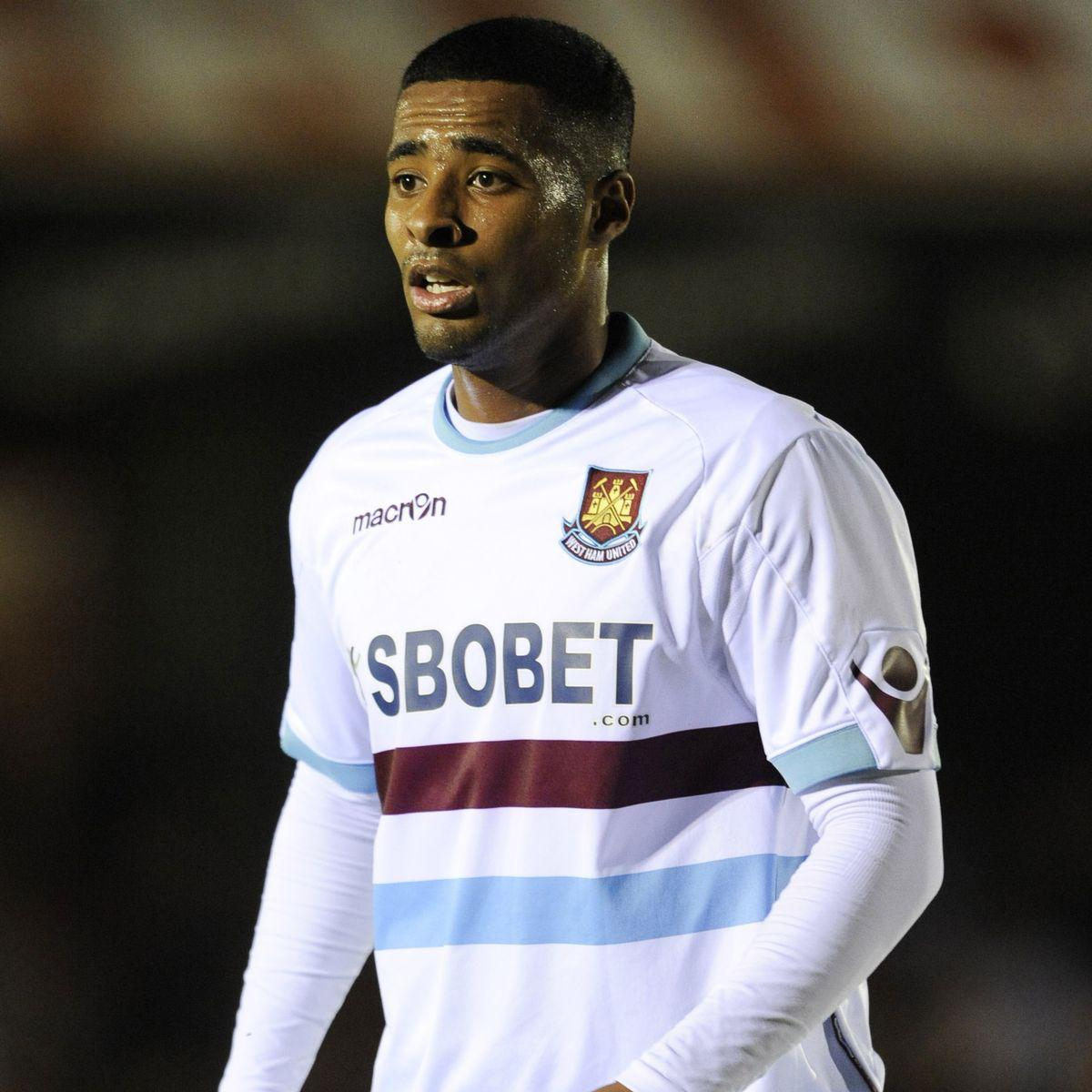
- Abdulla playing for West Ham

Personal information
- Full name: Ahmed Mohamed Abdulla
- Date of birth: 12 November 1991 (age 35)
- Place of birth: Jeddah, Saudi Arabia
- Height: 5 ft 8 in (1.73 m)
- Position: Midfielder

Team information
- Current team: NEC (assistant manager)

Youth career
- 2001–2008: Arsenal
- 2008–2011: West Ham United

Senior career*
Years	Team	Apps	(Gls)
2011–2012	West Ham United	0	(0)
2011	→ Swindon Town (loan)	6	(0)
2012	→ Dagenham & Redbridge (loan)	4	(0)
2012	Dagenham & Redbridge	1	(0)
2012–2014	Barnet	29	(3)
2014–2015	Whitehawk	25	(1)
2015–2016	Staines Town	38	(2)
2016–2017	Whitehawk	24	(4)
2017	→ Metropolitan Police (loan)	1	(0)
2017–2018	Ware	21	(1)
2018	Heybridge Swifts	23	(0)
2018–2019	Concord Rangers	22	(1)
2019	Hayes & Yeading United	3	(0)
2019	Bishop's Stortford	1	(0)
2019	Ware	6	(0)
2019–2021	Whitehawk	21	(12)
2021–2022	Sittingbourne	21	(8)
2022	Bedford	10	(1)
2022	Haywards Heath Town	4	(0)
2022–2023	Barking	28	(11)
2024–2025	FC Baresi	24	(2)

Managerial career
- 2022: Bedford (caretaker)
- 2023–2024: Castellón (assistant)
- 2025–: NEC (assistant)
- * Club domestic league appearances and goals as of 22:28, 19 May 2025 (UTC)

Ahmed Mohamed Abdulla (Arabic: أحمد عبدالله; born 12 November 1991) is a Saudi Arabian football coach and former professional footballer who is currently assistant manager at NEC.

== Early life ==
Of Somali and Yemeni descent Abdulla moved to Enfield, London aged eight. He was available for the selection of Saudi Arabia, Yemen and Somalia, but has pledged any future international career to Saudi Arabia.

== Playing career ==
Having previously played for Arsenal's youth team Abdulla joined West Ham as a sixteen-year-old in 2008. He signed his first professional contract, with West Ham, in the summer of 2011. In August 2011, he signed a loan deal with Swindon Town until January 2012. Abdulla made his debut on 3 September 2011 in a 3–2 home win against Rotherham United. In January 2012, Abdulla joined Dagenham & Redbridge on-loan. On his return to West Ham he was released by the club but signed a permanent short-term deal, until the end of the 2011–12 season, with Dagenham in March 2012. In May 2012, Abdulla was released by Dagenham due to the expiry of his contract.

On 4 July 2012, Abdulla signed for Barnet. He scored his first goal for Barnet against Salisbury City on 28 September 2013. His second goal was the winner in a 1–0 win at Hereford United on 19 October. Abdulla was released at the end of the 2013–14 season, though he was invited back for 2014–15 pre-season training. Abdulla played in pre-season friendlies for Barnet in 2014–15 but instead joined Whitehawk, followed by a year at Staines Town. Abdullah re-signed for Whitehawk for the start of the 2016–17 season. In March 2017 he was signed on loan by Metropolitan Police manager Jim Cooper. Ware secured his signature on 11 July 2017. He signed for Heybridge Swifts in February 2018. He left the club in October 2018 in the wake of manager Jody Brown's resignation. Abdulla joined Concord Rangers on 23 October 2018. He joined Hayes & Yeading United for the 2019–20 season. After only three appearances, Abdulla joined Bishop's Stortford. This spell was also short-lived, as he re-joined Ware after only two appearances. Abdulla re-joined Whitehawk in December 2019, but left the club after the end of the curtailed 2020–2021 season. Abdulla joined Sittingbourne for the 2021–22 season and scored a hat-trick on the first day of the new campaign. In January 2022 he joined Bedford, scoring once in ten games and also taking over as caretaker manager for the final three games of the season. He joined Haywards Heath Town for the 2022–23 season, before joining Barking. In 2024, he joined Eastern Counties Football League team FC Baresi.

== Coaching career ==
In July 2023, Abdulla was appointed by Castellón as assistant to new head coach Dick Schreuder, who was his manager at Barnet.

In September 2024, Abdulla was appointed as technical advisor at Zimbabwe Division One club Scottland. They won each of their last ten games to win promotion to the Premier Division.

He again linked up with Schreuder as assistant at NEC in May 2025.

== Career statistics ==
Appearances and goals by club, season and competition
Club	Season	League		Cup		Europe		Other*		Total	
Club	Season	Apps	Goals	Apps	Goals	Apps	Goals	Apps	Goals	Apps	Goals
West Ham United	2011–12	0	0	0	0	–	–	–	–	0	0
West Ham United	Total	0	0	0	0	–	–	–	–	0	0
Swindon Town (loan)	2011–12	6	0	0	0	–	–	1	0	7	0
Swindon Town (loan)	Total	6	0	0	0	–	–	1	0	7	0
Dagenham & Redbridge	2011–12	5	0	2	0	–	–	–	–	7	0
Dagenham & Redbridge	Total	5	0	2	0	–	–	–	–	7	0
Barnet	2012–13	6	0	1	0	–	–	–	–	7	0
Barnet	2013–14	23	3	2	0	–	–	1	0	26	3
Barnet	Total	29	3	1	0	–	–	–	–	33	3
Career Total		40	3	3	0	–	–	1	0	47	3

- Other = Football League Trophy, FA Trophy
