= 2008–09 Barnet F.C. season =

Barnet
2008–2009 season
- Chairman: Anthony Kleanthous
- Manager: Paul Fairclough; Ian Hendon
- Stadium: Underhill Stadium
- League Two: 17th
- FA Cup: First round
- League Cup: First round
- Football League Trophy: First round
- Top goalscorer: League: John O'Flynn (17); All: John O'Flynn (18)
- Biggest win: 4–1 (one match)
- Biggest defeat: 0–4 (two matches); 1–5 (one match)
Home colours	Away colours	Third colours

The 2008–09 season saw Barnet competed in Football League Two, alongside the FA Cup, Football League Cup and Football League Trophy.

== Season summary ==
The 2008–09 season started poorly, and by late September only the three teams that had been docked points prior to the start of the season had lower league positions. After a run of thirteen games without a win in any competition Paul Fairclough announced his resignation to take up a role as director and leaving the first team duties to his assistant Ian Hendon. Fairclough would take over one last game which resulted in a 2–0 win against another relegation threatened side AFC Bournemouth. Results improved, and before the end of the season Hendon was made permanent boss on a 2-year contract.

== Competitions ==
=== Football League Two ===
Pos	Team	Pld	W	D	L	GF	GA	GD	Pts
15	Aldershot Town	46	14	12	20	59	80	−21	54
16	Accrington Stanley	46	13	11	22	42	59	−17	50
17	Barnet	46	11	15	20	56	74	−18	48
18	Port Vale	46	13	9	24	44	66	−22	48
19	Notts County	46	11	14	21	49	69	−20	47

Source: The Football League
Rules for classification: 1) points; 2) goal difference; 3) number of goals scored.

==== Results ====
9 August 2008 1	Barnet	1–3	Chesterfield	High Barnet, London
				Stadium: Underhill Stadium; Attendance: 2,237; Referee: Graham Scott

16 August 2008 2	Rochdale	3–1	Barnet	Rochdale, Greater Manchester
				Stadium: Spotland Stadium; Attendance: 2,442; Referee: Oliver Langford

23 August 2008 3	Barnet	0–1	Brentford	High Barnet, London
				Stadium: Underhill Stadium; Attendance: 2,815; Referee: Darren Drysdale

30 August 2008 4	Chester	5–1	Barnet	Chester
				Stadium: Deva Stadium; Attendance: 1,295; Referee: Phil Gibbs

6 September 2008 5	Lincoln City	2–0	Barnet	Lincoln
				Stadium: Sincil Bank; Attendance: 3,417; Referee: Craig Pawson

13 September 2008 6	Barnet	1–1	Morecambe	High Barnet, London
				Stadium: Underhill Stadium; Attendance: 1,776; Referee: Fred Graham

20 September 2008 7	Barnet	1–2	Bury	High Barnet, London
				Stadium: Underhill Stadium; Attendance: 1,995; Referee: Simon Hooper

27 September 2008 8	Grimsby Town	0–1	Barnet	Cleethorpes, North East Lincolnshire
				Stadium: Blundell Park; Attendance: 3,717; Referee: Karl Evans

4 October 2008 9	Barnet	2–1	Accrington Stanley	High Barnet, London
				Stadium: Underhill Stadium; Attendance: 1,899; Referee: James Linington

10 October 2008 10	Dagenham & Redbridge	2–0	Barnet	Dagenham
				Stadium: Victoria; Attendance: 2,629; Referee: Gavin Ward

=== FA Cup ===
8 November 2008 First Round	Barnet	1–1	Rochdale	High Barnet, London
15:00 GMT	Yakubu 67'; Gillet (yellow card) 68'	Report	Dagnall 49'; Jones (yellow card) 63'; Holness (yellow card) 70'	Stadium: Underhill Stadium; Attendance: 1,782; Referee: J. Linnington

18 November 2008 First Round Replay	Rochdale	3–2 (a.e.t.)	Barnet	Rochdale
19:45 GMT	Le Fondre 56', 73', 105'; McArdle (yellow card) 87'	Report	O'Flynn 10'; Adomah 19'; Deverdics (yellow card) 61'; Bishop (yellow card) 75'; Townsend (yellow card) 117'	Stadium: Spotland Stadium; Attendance: 2,339; Referee: C Webster

=== Football League Cup ===
12 August 2008 First Round	Brighton & Hove Albion	4–0	Barnet	Brighton
19:45	Virgo 2', 35'; Forster 28'; Richards 43'; Murray (red card) 85'	Report	Gillet (red card) 70'	Stadium: Withdean Stadium; Attendance: 2,571; Referee: Roger East

=== Football League Trophy ===
2 September 2008 First Round	Dagenham & Redbridge	4–2	Barnet	Dagenham, London
	Benson 4', 34'; Nwokeji 28'; Southam 75' (pen.)	Report	Birchall 6', 18'	Stadium: Victoria Road; Attendance: 1,412; Referee: Graham Horwood

== Statistics ==
=== Appearances and goals ===
No.	Pos	Nat	Player	Total		League Two		FA Cup		League Cup		FL Trophy	
No.	Pos	Nat	Player	Apps	Goals	Apps	Goals	Apps	Goals	Apps	Goals	Apps	Goals
1	GK	(England) ENG	Rob Beckwith	6	0	5	0	0	0	1	0	0	0
1	GK	(England) ENG	Jake Cole	10	0	10	0	0	0	0	0	0	0
2	DF	(England) ENG	Joe Devera	36	1	34	1	1	0	1	0	0	0
3	DF	(France) FRA	Kenny Gillet	36	0	32	0	2	0	1	0	1	0
4	MF	(England) ENG	Neal Bishop	48	1	44	1	2	0	1	0	1	0
5	DF	(England) ENG	Ismail Yakubu	41	4	38	3	2	1	1	0	0	0
6	MF	(England) ENG	Michael Leary	32	2	28	2	2	0	1	0	1	0
7	FW	(Ghana) GHA	Albert Adomah	49	10	45	9	2	1	1	0	1	0
8	MF	(England) ENG	Max Porter	30	0	26	0	2	0	1	0	1	0
9	FW	(England) ENG	Cliff Akurang	25	3	24	3	0	0	0	0	1	0
10	FW	(Wales) WAL	Adam Birchall	43	4	39	2	2	0	1	0	1	2
11	MF	(England) ENG	Nicky Deverdics	31	1	29	1	2	0	0	0	0	0
12	FW	(England) ENG	Luke Medley	21	1	18	1	1	0	1	0	1	0
14	MF	(England) ENG	Kieron St Aimie	5	0	3	0	1	0	1	0	0	0
15	MF	(England) ENG	Joe Tabiri	8	0	7	0	0	0	1	0	0	0
16	MF	(Barbados) BRB	Ashley Carew	13	1	10	1	1	0	1	0	1	0
17	MF	(England) ENG	Danny Hart	4	1	3	1	0	0	1	0	0	0
18	GK	(England) ENG	Lee Harrison	23	0	21	0	2	0	0	0	0	0
19	FW	(England) ENG	Elliott Charles	6	0	5	0	0	0	0	0	1	0
21	DF	(England) ENG	Aswad Thomas	3	0	2	0	0	0	0	0	1	0
21	DF	(England) ENG	Michael Townsend	15	0	13	0	2	0	0	0	0	0
21	DF	(England) ENG	Matt Lockwood	12	0	12	0	0	0	0	0	0	0
22	DF	(France) FRA	Jérémy De Magalhaes	4	0	4	0	0	0	0	0	0	0
23	MF	(England) ENG	Paul Mitchell	4	0	3	0	0	0	0	0	1	0
23	MF	(England) ENG	Ryan Burge	1	0	1	0	0	0	0	0	0	0
23	MF	(England) ENG	Tommy Black	5	0	5	0	0	0	0	0	0	0
23	MF	(Northern Ireland) NIR	Mark Hughes	9	0	9	0	0	0	0	0	0	0
24	DF	(Cyprus) CYP	Nicky Nicolau	23	1	21	1	2	0	0	0	0	0
25/55	GK	(Israel) ISR	Ran Kadoch	13	0	12	0	0	0	0	0	1	0
26	DF	(England) ENG	Abu Ogogo	9	1	9	1	0	0	0	0	0	0
28	FW	(England) ENG	Paul Furlong	21	9	21	9	0	0	0	0	0	0
29	FW	(Republic of Ireland) IRL	John O'Flynn	36	18	34	17	2	1	0	0	0	0
30	MF	(Democratic Republic of the Congo) COD	Yannick Bolasie	20	3	20	3	0	0	0	0	0	0
