= 2009–10 Barnet F.C. season =

Barnet
- Chairman: Anthony Kleanthous
- Manager: Ian Hendon (sacked 28 April 2010); Paul Fairclough (hired as caretaker 28 April 2010)
- League Two: 21st
- FA Cup: Second round
- League Cup: First round
- Top goalscorer: League: John O'Flynn (12); All: John O'Flynn (16)
- Highest home attendance: 4,638 vs. Rochdale (League Two)
- Lowest home attendance: 1,288 vs. Accrington Stanley (FA Cup second round replay)
Home colours	Away colours

This article documents the 2009–10 season for North London football club Barnet.

== Appearances and goals ==
No.	Pos	Nat	Player	Total		League Two		League Cup		Football League Trophy		FA Cup	
No.	Pos	Nat	Player	Apps	Goals	Apps	Goals	Apps	Goals	Apps	Goals	Apps	Goals
1	GK	(England) ENG	Jake Cole	52	0	46	0	1	0	2	0	3	0
2	DF	(England) ENG	Joe Devera	36	0	31+2	0	0+1	0	2	0	0	0
3	DF	(France) FRA	Kenny Gillet	42	0	31+6	0	1	0	1	0	3	0
4	MF	(Northern Ireland) NIR	Mark Hughes	46	2	40+1	2	1	0	2	0	2	0
5	DF	(England) ENG	Ismail Yakubu	31	4	25	2	1	0	2	1	3	1
6	DF	(Republic of Ireland) IRL	Gary Breen	26	0	25	0	0	0	0	0	1	0
7	MF	(England) ENG	Albert Adomah	49	5	37+8	5	1	0	1	0	1+1	0
8	MF	(England) ENG	Nicky Deverdics	20	1	4+12	1	0	0	1	0	1+2	0
9	FW	(Republic of Ireland) IRL	John O'Flynn	41	16	31+5	12	0	0	2	1	3	3
10	MF	(Jamaica) JAM	Micah Hyde	46	2	41	1	1	0	1	0	3	1
11	MF	(Democratic Republic of the Congo) COD	Yannick Bolasie (on loan from Plymouth Argyle)	28	2	14+8	2	1	0	2	0	3	0
11	MF	(New Zealand) NZL	Chris James	2	0	0+2	0	0	0	0	0	0	0
12	DF	(Northern Ireland) NIR	Ryan O'Neill	16	0	11+4	0	1	0	0	0	0	0
14	MF	(Sierra Leone) SLE	Albert Jarrett	51	2	33+12	2	1	0	1+1	0	2+1	0
15	MF	(England) ENG	Joe Tabiri	6	0	2+3	0	0	0	0+1	0	0	0
16	FW	(England) ENG	Jake Hyde	39	7	17+17	6	0+1	0	2	1	0+2	0
17	MF	(England) ENG	Danny Hart	1	3	0+1	1	0	0	0	0+2	0	0
18	GK	(England) ENG	Lee Harrison	0	0	0	0	0	0	0	0	0	0
19	FW	(England) ENG	Elliott Charles	6	0	0+3	0	0+1	0	0+2	0	0	0
19	FW	(England) ENG	Ben Wright (on loan from Peterborough United)	3	0	0+3	0	0	0	0	0	0	0
19	FW	(England) ENG	Luke Medley	1	0	0+1	0	0	0	0	0	0	0
20	DF	(Australia) AUS	Daniel Leach	16	0	12+1	0	1	0	1	0	1	0
21	DF	(Cameroon) CMR	Clovis Kamdjo	17	0	14+1	0	0	0	1	0	0+1	0
22	DF	(Sierra Leone) SLE	Ahmed Deen	20	1	12+4	1	0	0	1	0	3	0
23	GK	(England) ENG	Phil Carpenter	0	0	0	0	0	0	0	0	0	0
24	GK	(England) ENG	Will Viner	0	0	0	0	0	0	0	0	0	0
25	FW	(England) ENG	Kofi Lockhart-Adams	1	0	0+1	0	0	0	0	0	0	0
26	MF	(Portugal) POR	Mauro Vilhete	2	0	1+1	0	0	0	0	0	0	0
27	DF	(England) ENG	Ryan Scott	0	0	0	0	0	0	0	0	0	0
28	FW	(England) ENG	Paul Furlong	42	5	31+7	5	1	0	0	0	3	0
29	DF	(England) ENG	Calum Butcher (on loan from Tottenham Hotspur)	4	0	3	0	0	0	0	0	1	0
29	MF	(England) ENG	Ed Upson (on loan from Ipswich Town)	9	1	5+4	1	0	0	0	0	0	0
30	FW	(Scotland) SCO	Craig McAllister (on loan from Exeter City)	5	0	4+1	0	0	0	0	0	0	0
31	MF	(England) ENG	Dean Sinclair (on loan from Charlton Athletic)	4	1	2+1	1	0	0	0	0	0+1	0
32	MF	(England) ENG	Lee Sawyer	7	1	4+3	1	0	0	0	0	0	0
33	DF	(England) ENG	Matthew Lockwood (on loan from Colchester United)	19	2	19	2	0	0	0	0	0	0
34	MF	(England) ENG	David Livermore	14	1	11+3	1	0	0	0	0	0	0

== Transfers ==
=== Out ===
Date from	Position	Nationality	Name	To	Fee	Ref.
6 May 2009	ST	(Wales)	Adam Birchall	Dover Athletic	Released	
6 May 2009	GK	(Israel)	Ran Kadoch	Bnei Yehuda	Released	
6 May 2009	MF	(England)	Michael Leary	Grimsby Town	Released	
6 May 2009	MF	(Cyprus)	Nicky Nicolau	Woking	Released	
6 May 2009	MF	(England)	Max Porter	Rushden & Diamonds	Released	
20 May 2009	MF	(England)	Neal Bishop	Notts County	Free transfer	
15 July 2009	RB	(England)	Ian Hendon	Barnet (Manager) (Note: Player-Manager Ian Hendon retired as a player to concentrate on management.)	Retired	
21 January 2010	CF	(Grenada)	Elliott Charles	Kettering Town	Released	
End of season	MF	(England)	Lee Sawyer	Woking	Released	

=== In ===
Date from	Position	Nationality	Name	From	Fee	Ref.
6 July 2009	GK	(England)	Jake Cole	Queens Park Rangers	Free	
24 August 2009	GK	(England)	Will Viner	Hendon	Free	
2 September 2009	LB/LM	(Sierra Leone)	Ahmed Deen	Macclesfield Town	Free	
9 August 2009	DF	(Northern Ireland)	Ryan O'Neill	West Ham United	Free	
July 2009	CB	(Australia)	Daniel Leach	Portland Timbers U23	Free	
9 August 2009	CM	(Cameroon)	Clovis Kamdjo	Reading	Free	
31 July 2009	LM	(Sierra Leone)	Albert Jarrett	Gillingham	Free	
2009	CF	(England)	Paul Furlong	Southend United	Free	
3 July 2009	CF	(England)	Jake Hyde	Swindon Town	Free	
July 2009	CM	(Jamaica)	Micah Hyde	Woking	Free	
14 January 2010	MF	(England)	Lee Sawyer	Chelsea	Free	
4 February 2010	CM	(England)	David Livermore	Brighton & Hove Albion	Free	
26 March 2010	DM	(New Zealand)	Chris James	Tampere United	Free	

=== Loans out ===
Date from	Position	Nationality	Name	To	Date until	Ref.
Summer 2009	ST	(England)	Cliff Akurang	Rushden & Diamonds	End of season	
21 July 2009	CF	(England)	Luke Medley	Woking	21 January 2010	
16 October 2009	CF	(Grenada)	Elliott Charles	Ebbsfleet United		
November 2009	MF	(England)	Joe Tabiri	Havant & Waterlooville	December 2009	
December 2009	CF	(Grenada)	Elliott Charles	Havant & Waterlooville	January 2010	
29 January 2010	MF	(England)	Danny Hart	Hemel Hempstead Town	29 February 2010	
February 2010	CB	(Australia)	Daniel Leach	Dover Athletic	March 2010	
5 February 2010	CF	(England)	Luke Medley	Havant & Waterlooville	April 2010	
5 February 2010	MF	(England)	Joe Tabiri	Havant & Waterlooville	March 2010	
March 2010	MF	(England)	Joe Tabiri	Dover Athletic		
2009–10	GK	(England)	Will Viner	Hemel Hempstead Town		

=== Loans in ===
Date from	Position	Nationality	Name	From	Date until	Ref.
1 August 2009	LW	(Democratic Republic of the Congo)	Yannick Bolasie	Plymouth Argyle	25 January 2010	
26 November 2009	DM	(England)	Calum Butcher	Tottenham Hotspur	26 December 2009	
26 November 2009	CF	(Scotland)	Craig McAllister	Exeter City		
26 November 2009	RW	(England)	Dean Sinclair	Charlton Athletic	26 December 2009	
January 2010	LB	(England)	Matthew Lockwood	Colchester United	February 2010 (Note: Lockwood's loan was extended to the end of the season.)	
11 March 2010	CF	(England)	Ben Wright	Peterborough United	20 April 2010	
12 March 2010	CM	(England)	Ed Upson	Ipswich Town	12 April 2010	

== Fixtures and results ==
=== League Two ===
8 August 2009	Lincoln City	1–0	Barnet	Sincil Bank, Lincoln
15:00	Oakes (yellow card) 24'; Swaibu (yellow card) 41'; Kovács 59' (yellow card) 77'; Butcher (yellow card) 90+4'	(Report)	Hughes (yellow card) 62'	Attendance: 3,753; Referee: Trevor Kettle

15 August 2009	Barnet	2–2	Shrewsbury Town	Underhill Stadium, Barnet
15:00	Leach (yellow card) 26'; J. Hyde 30' 44' (pen.); Furlong (yellow card) 81'	(Report)	Elder 2'; Murray (yellow card) 39'; Holden (yellow card) 44'; Hibbert 57'	Attendance: 1,835; Referee: Simon Hooper

18 August 2009	Barnet	2–0	Morecambe	Underhill Stadium, Barnet
19:45	Furlong 3' (yellow card) 52'; J. Hyde (yellow card) 63'; Tabiri (yellow card) 64'; Jarrett 83' (pen.)	(Report)	Wilson (yellow card) 66'; Moss (yellow card) 82'	Attendance: 1,298; Referee: Danny McDermid

22 August 2009	Torquay United	0–1	Barnet	Plainmoor, Torquay
15:00	Todd (yellow card) 26'; Carayol (yellow card) 86'	(Report)	Adomah 26'; O'Neill (yellow card) 64'; Furlong (yellow card) 88'	Attendance: 2,856; Referee: Gavin Ward

29 August 2009	Barnet	1–0	Notts County	Underhill Stadium, Barnet
15:00	M. Hughes (yellow card) 11'; M. Hyde (yellow card) 61'; J. Hyde 90+4'	(Report)	L. Hughes (yellow card) 28'; Moloney (yellow card) 90'	Attendance: 2,898; Referee: Darren Deadman

4 September 2009	Northampton Town	1–3	Barnet	Sixfields Stadium, Northampton
19:45	Marshall 30'; Gilligan (yellow card) 65'	(Report)	Deen 51'; Furlong 68'; O'Flynn 71'; O'Neill (yellow card) 87'	Attendance: 4,206; Referee: Paul Tierney

12 September 2009	Macclesfield Town	1–1	Barnet	Moss Rose, Macclesfield
15:00	Sappleton 12' (yellow card) 61'; Tremarco (yellow card) 44'	(Report)	O'Neill (yellow card) 9'; Hughes (yellow card) 35'; Morgan 41' (o.g.); Furlong (yellow card) 45'	Attendance: 1,125; Referee: Gary Sutton

19 September 2009	Barnet	2–2	Bradford City	Underhill Stadium, Barnet
15:00	Kamdjo (yellow card) 30'; O'Flynn 56'; Hughes 81'	(Report)	Hanson 14'; O'Brien (yellow card) 24'; Rehman 70'	Attendance: 2,282; Referee: Graham Scott

26 September 2009	Rotherham United	3–0	Barnet	Don Valley Stadium, Sheffield
15:00	Ellison 5'; Law 25'; Le Fondre 60'	(Report)	Leach (yellow card) 67'; Jarrett (yellow card) 84'	Attendance: 3,823; Referee: Peter Quinn

29 September 2009	Barnet	2–0	Dagenham & Redbridge	Underhill Stadium, Barnet
19:45	Furlong 21'; Hughes (yellow card) 43'; O'Flynn 45+3' (pen.); M.Hyde (yellow card) 59'; Yakubu (yellow card) 68'	(Report)	Doe (yellow card) 74'	Attendance: 2,093; Referee: Phil Crossley

3 October 2009	Barnet	3–0	Grimsby Town	Underhill Stadium, Barnet
15:00	O'Flynn 11' (pen.); Adomah 16'; Bolasie 67'	(Report)	Widdowson (yellow card) 35'; Bennett (yellow card) 44'; Conlon (red card) 87'; North (yellow card) 87'	Attendance: 2,497; Referee: Darren Sheldrake

10 October 2009	Rochdale	2–1	Barnet	Spotland Stadium, Rochdale
15:00	Dagnall 11'; Kennedy 45+1' (pen.); Jones (yellow card) 75'	(Report)	J.Hyde 84'; Cole (yellow card) 87'; Yakubu (yellow card) 90+4'	Attendance: 2,648; Referee: Colin Webster

17 October 2009	Burton Albion	2–0	Barnet	Pirelli Stadium, Burton upon Trent
15:00	Maghoma 8'; Austin 78'	(Report)	Jarrett (yellow card) 69'	Attendance: 2,935; Referee: Eddie Ilderton

24 October 2009	Barnet	3–0	Darlington	Underhill Stadium, Barnet
15:00	Furlong (yellow card) 15'; M. Hyde (yellow card) 55'; Yakubu 62'; Deverdics 80'; Bolasie 82'	(Report)	Collins (yellow card) 31'; Davis (yellow card) 75'	Attendance: 2,313; Referee: Steve Bratt

31 October 2009	Chesterfield	1–0	Barnet	Saltergate, Chesterfield
15:00	Robertson (yellow card) 31'; Boden 64'	(Report)	Hughes (yellow card) 40'	Attendance: 3,585; Referee: Neil Swarbrick

14 November 2009	Barnet	0–0	Hereford United	Underhill Stadium, Barnet
15:00		(Report)		Attendance: 1,965; Referee: Oliver Langford

21 November 2009	Barnet	0–0	Port Vale	Underhill Stadium, Barnet
15:00	Bolasie (yellow card) 23'	(Report)	J. Jarrett (yellow card) 87'; Fraser (red card) 90+5'	Attendance: 1,939; Referee: Fred Graham

24 November 2009	Cheltenham Town	5–1	Barnet	Whaddon Road, Cheltenham
19:45	Gallinagh 21'; Marshall 37' 86'; Richards 55'; Hayles (yellow card) 68'; Yakubu 88' (o.g.)	(Report)	O'Flynn 13'; Leach (yellow card) 20'; Gillet (yellow card) 37'; Hughes (yellow card) 45+2'	Attendance: 2,331; Referee: Roger East

1 December 2009	Barnet	1–1	A.F.C. Bournemouth	Underhill Stadium, Barnet
19:45	O'Flynn 15'; Cole (yellow card) 75'	(Report)	Robinson (yellow card) 39'; Pitman 44'; Bradbury (yellow card) 49'	Attendance: 2,030; Referee: Kevin Wright

5 December 2009	Bury	2–0	Barnet	Gigg Lane, Bury
15:00	Nardiello 45+2' (pen.); Baker (yellow card) 75'; Worrall 82'	(Report)	Hughes (yellow card) 20' (red card) 90+2'	Attendance: 2,511; Referee: Michael Oliver

12 December 2009	Barnet	1–2	Crewe Alexandra	Underhill Stadium, Barnet
15:00	Sinclair 40'; Butcher (yellow card) 90+3'	(Report)	Tootle (yellow card) 14'; Grant 25'; Westwood (yellow card) 58'; Donaldson 67'	Attendance: 1,841; Referee: Keith Hill

26 December 2009	Aldershot Town	4–0	Barnet	Recreation Ground, Aldershot
15:00	Grant 36' 59'; Sandell 65'; Donnelly 77'	(Report)	Hughes (yellow card) 15'; Yakubu (yellow card) 56'; Devera (yellow card) 58'	Attendance: 3,231; Referee: Darren Sheldrake

28 December 2009	Barnet	0–0	Northampton Town	Underhill Stadium, Barnet
15:00	Sinclair (yellow card) 45+2' (red card) 59'	(Report)	Benjamin (yellow card) 45+2'; Rodgers (yellow card) 90+3'	Attendance: 2,237; Referee: Chris Sarginson

16 January 2010	Barnet	1–2	Lincoln City	Underhill Stadium, Barnet
15:00	Deen (yellow card) 58'; Yakubu 75'; Sawyer (yellow card) 77'; M. Hyde (yellow card) 88'	(Report)	Hughton 30'; Herd (yellow card) 60'; John-Lewis 90+3'	Attendance: 1,810; Referee: Jock Waugh

23 January 2010	Morecambe	2–1	Barnet	Christie Park, Morecambe
15:00	Drummond 4'; Duffy (yellow card) 66' (goal) 78'	(Report)	Lockwood 34' (pen.)	Attendance: 1,558; Referee: Peter Quinn

26 January 2010	Barnet	1–1	Torquay United	Underhill Stadium, Barnet
19:45	Sawyer 15'; Breen (yellow card) 87'; Jarrett (yellow card) 88'	(Report)	Furlong 85' (o.g.)	Attendance: 1,331; Referee: Trevor Kettle

30 January 2010	Notts County	2–0	Barnet	Meadow Lane, Nottingham
15:00	Hawley 5'; Davies 25'; Bishop (yellow card) 33'; Hunt (yellow card) 45+1'	(Report)	Sawyer (yellow card) 33'; Hughes (yellow card) 43'	Attendance: 6,444; Referee: David Foster

6 February 2010	Barnet	3–0	Aldershot Town	Underhill Stadium, Barnet
15:00	M. Hyde 55'; O'Flynn 63' 85'	(Report)	Morgan (yellow card) 83'	Attendance: 2,145; Referee: Andy D'Urso

9 February 2010	Shrewsbury Town	2–0	Barnet	New Meadow, Shrewsbury
15:00	Disley 12'; Coughlan (yellow card) 18'; Leslie 28'	(Report)	Hughes (yellow card) 31'	Attendance: 4,328; Referee: Graham Salisbury

13 February 2010	Barnet	1–1	Cheltenham Town	Underhill Stadium, Barnet
15:00	Devera (yellow card) 23'; Adomah 35'	(Report)	Thornhill 20' (yellow card) 22'; Lewis (yellow card) 68'; Townsend (yellow card) 73'; Haynes (yellow card) 89'	Attendance: 1,667; Referee: Fred Graham

20 February 2010	Port Vale	0–2	Barnet	Vale Park, Stoke-on-Trent
15:00	Rigg (yellow card) 10'; Richards (yellow card) 21'; Fraser (yellow card) 74'; Owen (yellow card) 76'	(Report)	O'Flynn 8' 84'; Adomah (yellow card) 24'; Livermore (yellow card) 31'	Attendance: 4,571; Referee: Carl Dunn

23 February 2010	A.F.C. Bournemouth	3–0	Barnet	Dean Court, Bournemouth
19:45	Fletcher 59'; Pitman 61' 76'; Pearce (yellow card) 90'	(Report)	Devera (yellow card) 16'; Jarrett (yellow card) 73'	Attendance: 4,019; Referee: Danny McDermid

27 February 2010	Barnet	0–0	Bury	Underhill Stadium, Barnet
15:00	Lockwood (yellow card) 24'	(Report)		Attendance: 1,949; Referee: Pat Miller

6 March 2010	Crewe Alexandra	2–2	Barnet	Alexandra Stadium, Crewe
15:00	Donaldson 13' 82'	(Report)	O'Flynn 23'; Lockwood 29'; Breen (yellow card) 90+1'	Attendance: 3,551; Referee: Garry Sutton

13 March 2010	Barnet	1–2	Accrington Stanley	Underhill Stadium, Barnet
15:00	O'Flynn 32' (pen.); Hughes (yellow card) 54'; Kamdjo (red card) 80'	(Report)	Joyce (yellow card) 25'; Dunbavin (red card) 29'; Winnard (yellow card) 45+2'; Procter (yellow card) 56'; Edwards 59'; Kee 84'	Attendance: 1,559; Referee: Steve Cook

20 March 2010	Darlington	1–2	Barnet	The Darlington Arena, Darlington
15:00	Breen 57' (o.g.); Miller (yellow card) 79'	(Report)	Livermore 23'; Adomah 32'; J. Hyde (yellow card) 90+4'	Attendance: 1,463; Referee: Chris Sarginson

27 March 2010	Barnet	1–1	Burton Albion	Underhill Stadium, Barnet
15:00	Hughes 45+1'; Gillet (yellow card) 79'; Upson (yellow card) 87'	(Report)	Pearson 18'; Parkes (yellow card) 90+2'	Attendance: 1,842; Referee: Phil Gibbs

3 April 2010	Hereford United	2–1	Barnet	Edgar Street, Hereford
15:00	McQuilkin 29'; Breen 69' (o.g.)	(Report)	Rose 43' (o.g.)	Attendance: 2,146; Referee: Karl Evans

5 April 2010	Barnet	3–1	Chesterfield	Underhill Stadium, Barnet
15:00	Furlong 34' 45+3'; J. Hyde 42'; Hughes (yellow card) 56'; M. Hyde (yellow card) 68'	(Report)	Small 14'; Demontagnac (yellow card) 24'; Breckin (yellow card) 34'; Picken (yellow card) 53'	Attendance: 1,916; Referee: Jarnail Singh

10 April 2010	Barnet	1–2	Macclesfield Town	Underhill Stadium, Barnet
15:00	Livermore (yellow card) 47'; Upson (yellow card) 81' (goal) 90'	(Report)	Sinclair 54' (yellow card) 81'; Bell 89'	Attendance: 1,433; Referee: Steve Tanner

13 April 2010	Dagenham & Redbridge	4–1	Barnet	Victoria Road, Dagenham
19:45	Green 5' (pen.) (yellow card) 61' (goal) 67' (pen.); Nurse (yellow card) 56'; Gain (yellow card) 63'; Benson 80' (yellow card) 80'; Scott 82'	(Report)	J. Hyde 45+3'; Gillet (yellow card) 61'; Leach (red card) 66'	Attendance: 2,004; Referee: Andy Woolmer

17 April 2010	Bradford City	2–1	Barnet	Valley Parade, Bradford
15:00	O'Brien 79'; Flynn 90+3'	(Report)	Adomah 28'; Livermore (yellow card) 81'	Attendance: 11,138; Referee: Eddie Ilderton

24 April 2010	Barnet	0–1	Rotherham United	Underhill Stadium, Barnet
15:00	M. Hyde (yellow card) 84'; Lockwood (yellow card) 90+5'	(Report)	Ellison 34'; Gunning (yellow card) 66'; Fenton (yellow card) 82'	Attendance: 1,884; Referee: Steven Rushton

27 April 2010	Accrington Stanley	1–0	Barnet	Crown Ground, Accrington
19:45	Murphy (yellow card) 34'; Winnard (yellow card) 66'; Kee 70'; Grant (yellow card) 82'; Procter (yellow card) 90+1'	(Report)	Livermore (yellow card) 37'; Furlong (yellow card) 48'	Attendance: 1,268; Referee: Geoff Eltringham

1 May 2010	Grimsby Town	2–0	Barnet	Blundell Park, Cleethorpes
15:00	Atkinson 59'; Peacock (yellow card) 63'; Leary (yellow card) 66'; Devitt (yellow card) 80'; Hudson (yellow card) 90+3'	(Report)	M. Hyde (yellow card) 47'; Adomah (yellow card) 54'	Attendance: 7,033; Referee: Nigel Miller

8 May 2010	Barnet	1–0	Rochdale	Underhill Stadium, Barnet
15:00	Jarrett 90' (yellow card) 90'	(Report)	Holness (yellow card) 22'	Attendance: 4,638; Referee: Jon Moss

Pos	Team	Pld	W	D	L	GF	GA	GD	Pts	Promotion, qualification or relegation
19	Macclesfield Town	46	12	18	16	49	58	−9	54	
20	Lincoln City	46	13	11	22	42	65	−23	50	
21	Barnet	46	12	12	22	47	63	−16	48	
22	Cheltenham Town	46	10	18	18	54	71	−17	48	
23	Grimsby Town (R)	46	9	17	20	45	71	−26	44	Relegation to Conference National

Updated to match(es) played on unknown. Source: football-league.co.uk
(R) Relegated

=== League Cup ===
==== First round ====
11 August 2009	Barnet	0 – 2 (a.e.t.)	Watford	Underhill Stadium, Barnet
19:45	Furlong (yellow card) 40'; O'Neill (yellow card) 43'	(Report)	Hodson (yellow card) 60'; Williamson 105'; Severin 120+3'	Attendance: 3,139; Referee: Steve Cook

=== Football League Trophy ===
==== Southern Section first round ====
1 September 2009	Barnet	2–0	Millwall	Underhill Stadium, Barnet
19:45	J.Hyde 2'; Devera (yellow card) 43'; Yakubu 65'; Kamdjo (yellow card) 67'	(Report)	Dunne (yellow card) 33'	Attendance: 1,623; Referee: James Linington

==== Southern Section second round ====
6 October 2009	Charlton Athletic	4–1	Barnet	The Valley, Charlton
19:45	McLeod 15'; Tuna 40'; Bailey 75'; Wagstaff 87'	(Report)	O'Flynn 11'	Attendance: 4,522; Referee: David Phillips

=== FA Cup ===
==== First round ====
7 November 2009	Barnet	3–1	Darlington	Underhill Stadium, Barnet
15:00	Yakubu (yellow card) 4'; O'Flynn 18' 66'; M. Hyde 47'	(Report)	Smith (yellow card) 11'; Diop 73'	Attendance: 1,654; Referee: Darren Deadman

==== Second round ====
28 November 2009	Accrington Stanley	2–2	Barnet	Crown Ground, Accrington
15:00	Grant 29' (yellow card) 54'; Miles (red card) 37'; Symes 50' (yellow card) 76'; Kempson (yellow card) 90+6'	(Report)	Yakubu 47'; M. Hyde (yellow card) 51'; O'Flynn (yellow card) 62' (goal) 90+5' (pen.)	Attendance: 1,501; Referee: Craig Pawson

==== Second round replay ====
8 December 2009	Barnet	0–1	Accrington Stanley	Underhill Stadium, Barnet
19:45		(Report)	Grant 16'; Bouzanis (yellow card) 50'; Procter (yellow card) 52'; Murphy (yellow card) 62'	Attendance: 1,288; Referee: Danny McDermid
