= Ahmed Deen =

Sierra Leonean footballer

Personal information
- Full name: Ahmed Nuru Deen
- Date of birth: 30 June 1985 (age 41)
- Place of birth: Freetown, Sierra Leone
- Height: 5 ft 9 in (1.75 m)
- Position: Left back

Team information
- Current team: F.C. Elmstead

Youth career
- 2002–2004: Leicester City

Senior career*
Years	Team	Apps	(Gls)
2004–2005	Peterborough United	5	(0)
2004–2005	→ Hornchurch (loan)		
2005–2006	Aldershot Town	11	(0)
2006–2007	St Albans City	15	(0)
2007–2008	Bishop's Stortford	24	(4)
2008–2009	Macclesfield Town	28	(0)
2009–2010	Barnet	16	(1)
2010–2011	Hayes & Yeading United	14	(1)
2011	Dulwich Hamlet	10	(0)
2011	Cambridge City		
2011–2012	Thurrock	19	(2)
2012–2014	Dulwich Hamlet	63	(1)
2014	VCD Athletic		
2014–2015	Aveley		
2016–2019	Kent Football United		
2019–	FC Elmstead		

International career^{‡}
2007–2008	Sierra Leone	4	(0)
- * Club domestic league appearances and goals as of 18:29, 1 April 2019 (UTC) ‡ National team caps and goals as of 16:52, 28 December 2012 (UTC)

Ahmed Nuru Deen (born 30 June 1985) is a Sierra Leonean footballer who plays as a left back for FC Elmstead. He has played for the Sierra Leone national team.

Deen made his senior debut for Sierra Leone on 24 March 2007 against Togo in a 2008 African Nations Cup qualifier played in Freetown.

== Family background ==
Deen was born to Oku parents and grew up in Freetown, and later moved to England where he started his football career.

== Club career ==
Ahmed Deen arrived at the Moss Rose in the summer of 2008 from fellow League one club Peterborough United. He was once on the books as a trainee at Leicester City. He enjoyed spells with a variety of non-League teams, including Bishop's Stortford in the Conference South. He was released by Macclesfield Town at the end of the 2008–09 season, and signed with Barnet in August on a short-term deal. After some impressive performances he signed a two-year deal in September, linking up with his cousin Albert Jarrett. He scored his first goal, a free kick, for Barnet in a 3–1 away win against Northampton Town on 4 September 2009. Deen was due to sign for Dover Athletic on loan in March 2010 but this deal was called off as the Bees already had Daniel Leach and Joe Tabiri on loan at Dover, and a third would have breached league rules. Deen was released by Barnet at the end of the 2009–10 season.

Deen joined Hayes & Yeading United in August 2010, teaming up once again with former Barnet goalkeeper Lee Harrison, making his Conference debut in the home win over Bath City. He was released by Hayes & Yeading United in February 2011. In the same month, he joined Dulwich Hamlet.

In October 2011, Deen signed for Southern League club Cambridge City.

In December 2011, Deen signed for Conference South club Thurrock. He re-joined Dulwich Hamlet in August 2012, and was a regular choice at left-back as the Hamlet won the Isthmian League Division One South. Continued solid performances in the Hamlet's return season to the Premier Division earned him a place in the Non-League Paper Team of the Season for 2013–14. During the 2014–15 pre-season, it was announced that Deen would be leaving the Dulwich Hamlet playing staff, although he would be retaining links to the club through his work with the Dulwich Hamlet Football in the Community Programme.

After a spell with VCD Athletic, he transferred to Aveley in December 2014. In 2016, he joined Kent Football United as a player-coach.

== International career ==
Deen made his senior debut for Sierra Leone against Togo in a 2008 African Nations Cup qualifier played in Freetown on 24 March 2007. He was a starter for the Leone Stars during the 2010 FIFA World Cup and 2010 African Nations Cup matches against Equatorial Guinea, Nigeria, and the back to back games against South Africa. As of 2010, he has been capped 10 times by Sierra Leone.
