= Nicky Deverdics =

English footballer (born 1987)

Personal information
- Full name: Nicholas Ferenc Deverdics
- Date of birth: 24 November 1987 (age 38)
- Place of birth: Newcastle upon Tyne, England
- Height: 5 ft 11 in (1.80 m)
- Position: Midfielder

Team information
- Current team: Heaton Stannington F.C.

Youth career
- 2004–2006: Newcastle United

Senior career*
Years	Team	Apps	(Gls)
2006	Gateshead	15	(1)
2006–2007	Bedlington Terriers	12	(0)
2007–2008	Gretna	31	(3)
2008–2010	Barnet	51	(2)
2010–2011	Blyth Spartans	46	(2)
2011	BÍ/Bolungarvík	24	(4)
2012	Team Northumbria	4	(5)
2012	Alfreton Town	6	(0)
2013	Tvøroyrar Bóltfelag	26	(1)
2014	Tadcaster Albion	4	(0)
2014–2016	Dover Athletic	74	(18)
2016–2018	Hartlepool United	57	(3)
2017	→ Dover Athletic (loan)	5	(0)
2018–2019	Wrexham	24	(2)
2019–2021	Gateshead	39	(3)
2021–2025	Blyth Spartans	157	(22)
2025	Newton Aycliffe	14	(2)
2026	Heaton Stannington	11	(0)
- * Club domestic league appearances and goals as of 17:53, 24 May 2026 (UTC)

Nicholas Ferenc Deverdics (born 24 November 1987) is an English footballer who plays for Heaton Stannington as a midfielder.

== Career ==
=== Early career ===
Deverdics began his career as a trainee with Newcastle United, but was released at the end of the 2005–06 season.

Upon his release he joined Gateshead, leaving to join Bedlington Terriers in December 2006.

=== Promotion with Gretna to the Scottish Premier League ===
In March 2007 Deverdics moved to Gretna. Deverdics made an immediate impact and played a key role in helping them to clinch promotion – playing six times and scoring once. Deverdics went on to make 26 appearances for Gretna in the Scottish Premier League. On 19 May 2008 Deverdics was one of 40 members of staff who were released by Gretna, after financial problems forced the club to disband.

=== Life in the Football League with Barnet ===
Deverdics joined Barnet in July 2008 and went on to make 51 appearances for the Bees – winning the 'Most Improved Player' award in his first season. Upon signing Deverdics, the then manager Paul Fairclough told BBC London 94.9: "He has played in the Scottish Premier. He's only 20 and has got a great left foot and has a big future." Deverdics played in a midfield alongside the likes of Yannick Bolasie, Albert Adomah and Micah Hyde.

=== Becoming a Spartan ===
On the eve of the 2010–2011 season it was announced that Deverdics had signed for Conference North side Blyth Spartans. He made his debut as a second-half substitute in the 2–0 defeat to Solihull Moors on 14 August 2010.

He scored his first goal for the Spartans on 11 September 2010 in their 3–0 home win over Worcester City.

=== Breaking The Ice: BÍ/Bolungarvík ===
Deverdics joined Icelandic team BÍ/Bolungarvík on 11 May 2011. In a 3–2 win over Þróttur Reykjavík, he scored two direct free kicks; manager Guðjón Þórðarson said: "Clearly he tied his laces right because they were fine goals."

=== Alfreton Town ===
Deverdics signed for Alfreton Town in February 2012. He left the club in May 2012 after his non-contract terms expired.

=== TB Tvøroyri ===
Deverdics signed for Faroese top-flight club TB Tvøroyri in March 2013. He left the club at the end of the 2013 season as TB were relegated.

=== Tadcaster Albion ===
Deverdics signed for Northern Counties East League club Tadcaster Albion in February 2014. He made his debut on 26 February in the NCEL League Cup at Eccleshill United.

=== Dover Athletic ===
Deverdics signed for Conference Premier club Dover Athletic in July 2014.

=== Hartlepool United ===
On 6 June 2016 it was announced that Deverdics had signed for Hartlepool United on a free transfer. Deverdics scored his first goal for Hartlepool in an FA Cup tie against Stamford on 6 November 2016.

=== Wrexham ===
On 31 January 2018, Deverdics signed an 18-month contract with National League side Wrexham. Deverdics scored his first goal for Wrexham in the Cross-border derby against Chester on 11 March 2018, the 2nd goal in a 2–0 win. He was released by the club on 8 May 2019.

=== Gateshead ===
On 5 August 2019, Deverdics re-joined Gateshead.

=== Blyth Spartans ===
On 9 July 2021, Deverdics re-signed for National League North side Blyth Spartans. On 25 May 2024, Deverdics renewed his contract with Spartans ahead of the 2024-25 Northern Premier League season, having captained the team the season prior, which ended with relegation from the National League North.

He signed for Newton Aycliffe in July 2025, then for Heaton Stannington in January 2026.

== Career statistics ==
As of end of the 2025-26 season

Appearances and goals by club, season and competition
Club	Season	League			National Cup		League Cup		Other		Total	
Club	Season	Division	Apps	Goals	Apps	Goals	Apps	Goals	Apps	Goals	Apps	Goals
Gateshead	2006–07	Northern Premier League Premier Division	15	1	1	0	–		6	0	22	1
Bedlington Terriers	2006–07	Northern Football League Division One	12	0	0	0	–		0	0	12	0
Gretna	2006–07	Scottish First Division	6	1	0	0	0	0	0	0	6	1
Gretna	2007–08	Scottish Premier League	25	2	2	0	1	0	0	0	28	2
Gretna	Total		31	3	2	0	1	0	0	0	34	3
Barnet	2008–09	League Two	29	1	2	0	0	0	0	0	31	1
Barnet	2009–10	League Two	16	1	3	0	0	0	0	0	19	1
Barnet	Total		45	2	5	0	0	0	0	0	50	2
Blyth Spartans	2010–11	Conference North	36	3	0	0	–		5	0	41	3
BÍ/Bolungarvík	2011	1. deild karla	20	2	4	2	0	0	0	0	24	4
Team Northumbria	2011–12	Northern Football League Division Two	4	5	0	0	–		0	0	4	5
Alfreton Town	2011–12	Football Conference	6	0	0	0	–		0	0	6	0
Tvøroyrar Bóltfelag	2013	Effodeildin	26	1	1	0	0	0	0	0	27	1
Tadcaster Albion	2013–14	Northern Counties East Football League	4	0	0	0	–		0	0	4	0
Dover Athletic	2014–15	Football Conference	43	7	5	1	–		6	2	54	10
Dover Athletic	2015–16	National League	47	14	2	0	–		5	2	54	16
Dover Athletic	Total		90	21	7	1	–		11	4	108	26
Hartlepool United	2016–17	League Two	28	1	2	1	1	0	2	0	33	2
Hartlepool United	2017–18	National League	29	2	2	1	–		1	0	32	3
Hartlepool United	Total		57	3	4	2	1	0	3	0	65	5
Dover Athletic (loan)	2016–17	National League	5	0	0	0	–		0	0	5	0
Wrexham	2017–18	National League	12	1	0	0	–		0	0	12	1
Wrexham	2018–19	National League	12	1	2	0	–		1	0	15	1
Wrexham	Total		24	2	2	0	0	0	1	0	27	2
Gateshead	2019–20	National League North	28	3	4	0	–		0	0	32	3
Gateshead	2020–21	National League North	11	0	1	0	–		1	0	13	0
Gateshead	Total		39	3	5	0	0	0	1	0	45	3
Blyth Spartans	2021–22	National League North	40	0	3	0	–		2	0	45	0
Blyth Spartans	2022–23	National League North	42	7	4	0	–		2	0	48	7
Blyth Spartans	2023–24	National League North	44	11	2	0	–		2	1	48	11
Blyth Spartans	2024–25	Northern Premier League Premier Division	31	4	3	0	–		1	0	35	4
Blyth Spartans	Total		157	22	12	0	0	0	7	1	176	23
Newton Aycliffe	2025–26	Northern Premier League East Division	14	2	0	0	—		0	0	14	2
Heaton Stannington	2025–26	Northern Premier League East Division	11	0	0	0	—		0	0	11	0
Total			586	70	43	5	2	0	34	5	675	80
