= 2008–09 Football League Two =

Football League Two
- Season: 2008–09
- Champions: Brentford
- Promoted: Brentford; Exeter City; Wycombe Wanderers; Gillingham
- Relegated: Chester City; Luton Town
- Matches: 557
- Top goalscorer: Grant Holt; Simeon Jackson (20)
- Longest winning run: 7 games

The Football League 2008–09, known as the Coca-Cola Football League for sponsorship reasons, was the 17th season under its current league division format. It began in August 2008 and concluded in May 2009, with the promotion play-off finals.

The Football League is contested through three Divisions. The third division of these is League Two. The winner, runner up and third-placed team of League Two will be automatically promoted to Football League One and they will be joined by the winner of the League Two playoff. The bottom two teams in the league will be relegated from the Football League to the Conference National for the 2009–10 season.

Before the season started, Luton Town, Rotherham United and AFC Bournemouth were all docked points for the League Two season for, in all cases, financial problems and additionally, in the case of Luton, for criminal matters regarding transfers of players. Bournemouth and Rotherham both started on −17 points while Luton had to begin on −30 points. On 25 January, Darlington were docked ten points after going into administration.

== Changes from last season ==
=== From League Two ===
Promoted to League One

- Milton Keynes Dons
- Peterborough United
- Hereford United
- Stockport County

Relegated to Conference National

- Wrexham
- Mansfield Town

=== To League Two ===
Relegated from League One

- Bournemouth
- Gillingham
- Port Vale
- Luton Town

Promoted from Conference National

- Aldershot Town
- Exeter City

== League table ==
Pos	Team	Pld	W	D	L	GF	GA	GD	Pts	Promotion, qualification or relegation
1	Brentford (C, P)	46	23	16	7	65	36	+29	85	Promotion to Football League One
2	Exeter City (P)	46	22	13	11	65	50	+15	79	Promotion to Football League One
3	Wycombe Wanderers (P)	46	20	18	8	54	33	+21	78	Promotion to Football League One
4	Bury	46	21	15	10	63	43	+20	78	Qualification for League Two play-offs
5	Gillingham (O, P)	46	21	12	13	58	55	+3	75	Qualification for League Two play-offs
6	Rochdale	46	19	13	14	70	59	+11	70	Qualification for League Two play-offs
7	Shrewsbury Town	46	17	18	11	61	44	+17	69	Qualification for League Two play-offs
8	Dagenham & Redbridge	46	19	11	16	77	53	+24	68	
9	Bradford City	46	18	13	15	66	55	+11	67	
10	Chesterfield	46	16	15	15	62	57	+5	63	
11	Morecambe	46	15	18	13	53	56	−3	63	
12	Darlington	46	20	12	14	61	44	+17	62 (Note: Darlington deducted 10 points for entering administration.)	
13	Lincoln City	46	14	17	15	53	52	+1	59	
14	Rotherham United	46	21	12	13	60	46	+14	58 (Note: Rotherham United deducted 17 points for leaving administration without a Company Voluntary Agreement.)	
15	Aldershot Town	46	14	12	20	59	80	−21	54	
16	Accrington Stanley	46	13	11	22	42	59	−17	50	
17	Barnet	46	11	15	20	56	74	−18	48	
18	Port Vale	46	13	9	24	44	66	−22	48	
19	Notts County	46	11	14	21	49	69	−20	47	
20	Macclesfield Town	46	13	8	25	45	77	−32	47	
21	Bournemouth	46	17	12	17	59	51	+8	46 (Note: Bournemouth deducted 17 points for leaving administration without a Company Voluntary Agreement.)	
22	Grimsby Town	46	9	14	23	51	69	−18	41	
23	Chester City (R)	46	8	13	25	43	81	−38	37	Relegated to Conference National
24	Luton Town (R)	46	13	17	16	58	65	−7	26 (Note: Luton Town deducted 30 points; 20 points for leaving administration without a Company Voluntary Agreement, and 10 points for making illegal payments to agents.)	Relegated to Conference National

Source: The Football League
Rules for classification: 1) points; 2) goal difference; 3) number of goals scored.
(C) Champions; (O) Play-off winners; (P) Promoted; (R) Relegated

=== Play-offs ===
Semifinals
7	Shrewsbury Town	0	1 (4)	1
4	Bury	1	0 (3)	1
6	Rochdale	0	1	1
5	Gillingham	0	2	2

Final at Wembley
Shrewsbury Town	0
Gillingham	1

== Stadia and locations ==
Locations of the League Two 2008–09 teams

Team	Stadium	Capacity
Darlington	The Darlington Arena	25,294*
Bradford City	Valley Parade	25,136
Rotherham United	Don Valley Stadium	25,000
Port Vale	Vale Park	22,356
Notts County	Meadow Lane	19,588
Brentford	Griffin Park	12,763
Bury	Gigg Lane	11,840
Gillingham	Priestfield Stadium	11,582
Bournemouth	Dean Court	10,700
Luton Town	Kenilworth Road	10,260
Rochdale	Spotland Stadium	10,249
Lincoln City	Sincil Bank	10,127
Wycombe Wanderers	Adams Park	10,000
Shrewsbury Town	New Meadow	9,875
Grimsby Town	Blundell Park	9,106
Exeter City	St James Park	9,036
Chesterfield	Saltergate	8,504
Aldershot Town	Recreation Ground	7,100
Morecambe	Christie Park	6,400
Macclesfield Town	Moss Rose	6,335
Dagenham & Redbridge	Victoria Road	6,000
Barnet	Underhill Stadium	5,568
Chester City	Deva Stadium	5,376
Accrington Stanley	Crown Ground	5,057

*Capacity limited to 6,000 because of planning regulations

== Results ==
Home \ Away	ACC	ALD	BAR	BOU	BRA	BRE	BRY	CHE	CHF	D&R	DAR	EXE	GIL	GRI	LIN	LUT	MAC	MOR	NTC	PTV	ROC	ROT	SHR	WYC
Accrington Stanley		0–1	1–1	3–0	2–3	1–1	1–2	0–1	1–0	0–0	1–0	2–1	0–2	3–1	0–2	0–0	2–0	1–0	1–1	2–0	1–3	1–3	2–1	0–1
Aldershot Town	3–1		1–1	1–1	3–2	1–1	3–3	2–2	1–1	1–2	2–1	1–0	2–1	2–2	2–0	2–1	1–1	0–2	2–2	1–0	2–4	0–1	0–0	3–2
Barnet	2–1	0–3		1–0	4–1	0–1	1–2	3–1	1–3	1–1	0–1	0–1	2–2	3–3	3–2	1–1	1–3	1–1	0–4	1–2	2–1	2–0	0–0	1–1
Bournemouth	1–0	2–0	0–2		4–1	0–1	2–0	1–0	1–1	2–1	3–1	0–1	1–1	2–1	0–1	1–1	0–1	0–0	0–1	0–0	4–0	0–0	1–0	3–1
Bradford City	1–1	5–0	3–3	1–3		1–1	1–0	0–0	3–2	1–1	0–0	4–1	2–2	2–0	1–1	1–1	1–0	4–0	2–1	0–1	2–0	3–0	0–0	1–0
Brentford	3–0	3–0	1–0	2–0	2–1		1–0	3–0	0–1	2–1	1–1	1–1	1–1	4–0	1–1	2–0	1–0	3–1	1–1	2–0	1–2	0–0	1–1	3–3
Bury	1–0	2–1	1–0	1–0	1–0	1–0		1–1	1–2	2–2	2–2	0–1	4–0	0–2	3–1	1–2	3–0	2–1	2–0	3–0	2–1	1–2	2–1	0–0
Chester City	2–0	0–1	5–1	0–2	0–0	3–0	1–1		1–3	2–2	1–2	0–0	0–1	1–1	0–2	2–2	0–2	1–2	2–0	1–2	0–2	1–5	1–1	0–2
Chesterfield	1–1	5–1	1–1	1–0	0–2	0–1	1–3	1–1		1–1	0–0	2–1	0–1	2–1	1–1	2–2	2–4	1–2	3–1	2–1	3–0	1–0	2–2	0–1
Dagenham & Redbridge	0–0	3–1	2–0	0–1	3–0	3–1	1–3	6–0	3–0		0–1	1–2	2–0	4–0	0–3	2–1	2–1	0–2	6–1	1–1	3–2	1–1	1–2	0–1
Darlington	3–0	2–0	2–2	2–1	2–1	1–3	2–2	1–2	0–0	3–0		1–1	1–2	1–0	2–0	5–1	1–2	0–0	1–0	2–1	1–2	1–0	1–1	1–2
Exeter City	2–1	3–2	2–1	1–3	1–0	0–2	0–0	2–0	1–6	2–1	2–0		3–0	0–0	2–1	0–1	4–0	2–2	2–2	1–0	4–1	1–1	0–1	1–0
Gillingham	1–0	4–4	0–2	1–0	0–2	1–1	0–0	2–0	2–1	2–1	1–0	1–0		3–0	1–2	0–1	3–1	5–0	2–2	1–0	1–1	4–0	2–2	1–1
Grimsby Town	0–1	1–0	0–1	3–3	1–3	0–1	1–2	1–3	0–1	1–1	1–2	2–2	3–0		5–1	2–2	0–0	2–3	0–1	3–0	0–0	3–0	1–0	1–1
Lincoln City	5–1	0–2	2–0	3–3	0–0	2–2	1–1	1–1	3–1	1–3	0–1	0–1	2–0	1–1		0–0	1–0	1–1	1–1	0–1	1–1	0–1	0–0	1–0
Luton Town	1–2	3–1	3–1	3–3	3–3	0–1	1–2	1–1	0–0	2–1	1–2	1–2	0–0	2–1	3–2		1–0	1–1	1–1	1–3	1–1	2–4	3–1	0–1
Macclesfield Town	0–2	4–2	2–1	0–2	0–2	2–0	1–1	3–1	1–1	0–4	0–6	1–4	0–1	1–0	1–2	2–1		0–1	1–1	0–2	0–1	1–2	3–0	0–0
Morecambe	1–1	2–0	2–1	0–4	2–1	2–0	0–0	3–1	2–2	1–2	1–0	1–1	0–1	1–1	1–1	1–2	4–1		1–0	1–1	1–1	1–3	1–0	0–0
Notts County	1–1	2–1	2–0	1–1	3–1	1–1	0–1	1–2	0–1	0–3	0–0	2–1	0–1	0–2	0–1	0–2	1–1	1–0		4–2	1–2	0–3	2–2	0–2
Port Vale	0–2	0–0	0–0	3–1	0–2	0–3	1–1	3–0	0–1	0–1	3–1	1–3	1–3	2–1	0–1	1–3	1–4	2–1	1–2		2–1	0–0	1–1	1–1
Rochdale	3–1	3–1	3–1	1–1	3–0	1–2	1–1	6–1	2–1	0–2	0–2	2–2	0–1	2–0	2–2	2–0	1–1	1–1	3–0	1–0		1–2	2–1	0–1
Rotherham United	0–0	1–2	3–4	1–0	0–2	0–0	1–1	3–1	3–0	1–1	0–1	0–1	2–0	4–1	1–0	1–0	2–0	3–2	2–1	1–0	2–2		1–2	0–0
Shrewsbury Town	2–0	1–0	2–2	4–1	2–0	1–3	1–0	1–0	2–1	2–1	1–0	1–1	7–0	1–1	0–0	3–0	4–0	0–0	3–2	1–2	1–1	1–0		0–1
Wycombe Wanderers	2–1	3–0	1–1	3–1	1–0	0–0	2–1	2–0	1–1	2–1	1–1	1–1	1–0	0–1	1–0	0–0	4–0	1–1	1–2	4–2	0–1	0–0	1–1	

Source: The Football League
Legend: Blue = home team win; Yellow = draw; Red = away team win.

== Top scorers ==
Pos	Player	Team	Goals
1	(Canada) Simeon Jackson	Gillingham	20
1	(England) Grant Holt	Shrewsbury Town	20
1	(England) Jack Lester	Chesterfield	20
4	(England) Adam Le Fondre	Rochdale	17
4	(Republic of Ireland) John O'Flynn	Barnet	17
4	(England) Reuben Reid	Rotherham United	17
7	(England) Charlie MacDonald	Brentford	16
8	(England) Andy Bishop	Bury	15
8	(England) Peter Thorne	Bradford City	15
10	(England) Paul Benson	Dagenham & Redbridge	14
10	(England) Ryan Lowe	Chester City	14
10	(Jersey) Brett Pitman	Bournemouth	14
10	(Northern Ireland) Jamie Ward	Chesterfield	14

== Monthly awards ==
Month	Manager of the Month		Player of the Month		Notes
Month	Manager	Club	Player	Club	Notes
August	(England) Mark Robins	Rotherham United	(Nigeria) Solomon Taiwo	Dagenham & Redbridge	
September	(Wales) Alan Knill	Bury	(England) Matthew Gill	Exeter City	
October	(England) Peter Jackson	Lincoln City	(Northern Ireland) Jamie Ward	Chesterfield	
November	(England) Peter Taylor	Wycombe Wanderers	(England) Grant Holt	Shrewsbury Town	
December	(England) John Still	Dagenham & Redbridge	(Jamaica) Marcus Bean	Brentford	
January	(Wales) Alan Knill	Bury	(France) Dany N'Guessan	Lincoln City	
February	(Northern Ireland) Sammy McIlroy	Morecambe	(England) Charlie MacDonald	Brentford	
March	(England) Lee Richardson	Chesterfield	(England) Reuben Reid	Rotherham United	
April	(England) Andy Scott	Brentford	(England) Sam Saunders	Dagenham & Redbridge	

== Key events ==
25 February 2009 – Darlington are docked 10 points by the FA for entering administration

2 May 2009 – Brentford crowned Champions of League 2 after 3–1 win at Darlington.

== Managerial changes ==
Team	Outgoing manager	Manner of departure	Date of vacancy	Replaced by	Date of appointment	Position in table
Bournemouth	Kevin Bond	Contract terminated	1 September 2008	Jimmy Quinn	2 September 2008	23rd
Grimsby Town	Alan Buckley	Contract terminated	15 September 2008	Mike Newell	6 October 2008	20th
Port Vale	Lee Sinnott	Mutual consent	22 September 2008	Dean Glover	6 October 2008	16th
Chester City	Simon Davies	Contract terminated	11 November 2008	Mark Wright	14 November 2008	19th
Barnet	Paul Fairclough	Resigned	28 December 2008	Ian Hendon	21 April 2009	16th
Bournemouth	Jimmy Quinn	Contract terminated	31 December 2008	Eddie Howe	31 December 2008	23rd

== See also ==
- 2008–09 Football League
- 2008–09 in English football
- 2008–09 Aldershot Town F.C. season
- 2008–09 Bradford City A.F.C. season
- 2008–09 Grimsby Town F.C. season
- 2008–09 Luton Town F.C. season
