= Albert Jarrett =

Sierra Leonean footballer (born 1984)

Personal information
- Full name: Albert Ojumiri Jarrett
- Date of birth: 23 October 1984 (age 42)
- Place of birth: Freetown, Sierra Leone
- Height: 5 ft 11 in (1.80 m)
- Position: Winger

Youth career
- Arsenal
- 2002–2003: Dulwich Hamlet

Senior career*
Years	Team	Apps	(Gls)
2003–2004	Wimbledon	9	(0)
2004–2006	Brighton & Hove Albion	23	(1)
2005	→ Stevenage Borough (loan)	4	(0)
2006	→ Swindon Town (loan)	6	(0)
2006–2007	Watford	1	(0)
2007	→ Boston United (loan)	5	(2)
2007	→ Milton Keynes Dons (loan)	5	(0)
2008–2009	Gillingham	16	(0)
2009–2010	Barnet	45	(2)
2010–2011	Lincoln City	22	(1)
2011	→ Aldershot Town (loan)	2	(0)
2011–2012	Lewes	14	(0)
2012–2014	Bromley	30	(0)
2014	Sutton United	1	(0)
2014–2016	Dulwich Hamlet	31	(1)
Total		214	(7)

International career
2007–2010	Sierra Leone	6	(0)
- * Club domestic league appearances and goals

Albert Ojumiri Jarrett (born 23 October 1984) is a Sierra Leonean footballer who last played for Dulwich Hamlet and has represented the Sierra Leone national football team.

== Club career ==
Jarrett was born in Freetown to Creole parents, but was raised in South London, England. He started his career as a schoolboy at Arsenal, before joining the youth academy at Dulwich Hamlet.

During the 2002–03 season, he was spotted by Wimbledon whilst playing for Dulwich Hamlet in the FA Youth Cup, and was offered a place in the Dons academy set-up. He played ten games for the Dons in 2003–04, but was released at the end of the season.

In August 2004 he signed a three-year deal with Championship team Brighton & Hove Albion, having impressed on a trial basis. He scored one goal against Crewe Alexandra, but soon fell out of the first team picture. In March 2005 he was loaned out to Conference National team Stevenage Borough, where he made four appearances.

He missed the start of the 2005–06 campaign with a foot injury. Upon his recovery he joined Swindon Town on a one-month loan deal on 19 January 2006, making his debut for the club two days later in a 4–2 victory over AFC Bournemouth. Having made one start and three substitute appearances in his initial month at the club, his loan was extended for a second month, before he returned to Brighton.

On being made available for a free transfer by Brighton at the end of the 2005–06 season, Jarrett went on trial at Watford. After impressing in several pre-season friendlies, he was signed on a one-year deal in August 2006. Jarrett made one Premier League appearance for Watford, coming on as a substitute for Tommy Smith 71 minutes into a 1–0 defeat to Bolton Wanderers at the Reebok Stadium on 9 September 2006. In February 2007, he was loaned to League Two relegation candidates Boston United for a monthlong spell. In his last game for the Pilgrims he scored both goals in a 2–1 win over Bristol Rovers. Having returned from Boston, he was immediately loaned to Milton Keynes Dons for the remainder of the season, where he played five games. He was released by Watford at the end of the season.

He joined Southend United on trial in August 2007, however a knee injury caused him to miss the duration of the 2007–08 season.

He spent August 2008 on trial at Yeovil Town. He then joined Gillingham, initially on trial, before signing a one-month contract with the club on 18 September 2008, and making his debut as a substitute in a home win over Port Vale on 27 September. He claimed to be attracted to manager Mark Stimson's attacking style. After making four league and cup appearances during his initial month, Jarrett agreed a further month's contract with the club on 21 October 2008, and the contract was extended until the end of the 2008–09 season on 20 November 2008. The season concluded with the Gills winning promotion into League One with a 1–0 victory over Shrewsbury Town in the League Two play-off final at Wembley Stadium on 23 May 2009. Jarrett was an unused substitute for the match, and three days later he was told that his contract would not be extended, though he would be invited back to the club in pre-season to compete for a contract.

He signed a three-month contract with Barnet in July 2009. Following the expiry of this deal he signed a new two-year contract with the club. He scored the only goal for the Bees in a final day encounter with Rochdale at Underhill, this goal guaranteed the club their Football League survival, though Grimsby Town's defeat in another match did make the result irrelevant by the full-time whistle. Despite this, and despite him making a total of 51 appearances in 2009–10, his contract was not renewed, and he was released in June 2010.

On 29 June 2010, Jarrett agreed to join Lincoln City on a one-year deal. He made 26 appearances for the club in 2010–11, and his goal against Crewe at Sincil Bank earned the club their first home point of the season, whilst he also scored the only goal of the club's FA Cup First Round clash with Nuneaton Town. In February 2011, he joined on loan at Aldershot Town, after wishing to play the first team football he was denied at Lincoln. He played four games for the Shots in his month long spell. He departed Sincil Bank on 28 March after his contract with the Imps was terminated by mutual consent, after the club wished to cut costs.

In September 2011, he joined League Two Port Vale on a trial basis, but was not offered a deal. In November 2011, he linked up with Lewes, debuting in their 1–0 defeat at East Thurrock United on 22 November. On 27 January 2012, he joined Bromley after impressing in a friendly for them against a Queens Park Rangers development side. He set up Bromley's first goal after just two minutes on his league debut against Weston-Super-Mare, helping Bromley to a 3–0 win – their first victory for over 3 months. On 27 April 2012, he signed a new contract with the club, keeping him there until the end of the 2012–13 season. He has impressed in his first season at Bromley, picking up Man of the Match awards on several occasions, including some from The Non-League Paper. He provided many assists during the course of the 2011/12 season.

After two years at Bromley, Jarrett signed for Sutton United ahead of the 2014/15 season. After making just one appearance in the Sutton United first team, he made a return to Dulwich Hamlet of the Isthmian League Premier Division, making his debut as a substitute on 12 November 2014 against Maidstone United, some 12 years after originally signing first team forms at the club. He scored his first goal for the club on 31 January 2015, firing home the opening goal in a 2–0 victory over Grays Athletic.

Jarrett was released from Dulwich Hamlet towards the end of March 2016, with Hamlet manager Gavin Rose citing a lack of end product being behind the decision to release him.

== International career ==
Jarrett was invited to make his international debut for Sierra Leone national team in October 2006 in a 2008 Africa Cup of Nations qualifier. However, he turned down this invitation along with a further one in March 2007.

On 7 May 2007, he played for Sierra Leone in a friendly against English side Leyton Orient.

He played a further four games for his country, and despite wishing to put his club career ahead of his international career, he earned another cap on 5 September 2010, when he appeared for Sierra Leone in a 1–1 draw with Egypt in a 2012 Africa Cup of Nations qualification match in Cairo.

== Style of play ==
"When he came here for the first couple of weeks on trial he looked as if he had something really different. He's got that explosive pace, he can cross a ball with his left foot. They've taken him up there and seen the same thing but we've never seen it since really from Albert. That's why we're not going to wait any longer."

— Brighton & Hove Albion manager Mark McGhee gave his 'warning' to Watford in September 2011.

In an interview in September 2011, Jarrett said that "I like getting at full-backs, getting to the by-line and getting crosses in to provide the service."

"He had an opportunity, we gave him plenty of games. Albert's got a great left foot and he crosses the ball well but with the position we're in we need people who are going to work hard and graft and maybe Albert's not that type of player."

— Having praised him earlier in the season, Lincoln City manager Steve Tilson explained his decision to release Jarrett early from his contract in 2011.

== Personal life ==
On 31 January 2006, he was involved in a car crash whilst on his way to Swindon Town's game with Walsall. He was later fined £1,200, had six points put on his licence, and received a six-month driving ban for the incident.

He is a cousin of Ahmed Deen, the pair played alongside each other for Barnet.

== Statistics ==
=== Club level ===
As of 4 September 2011.

Club performance			League		Cup		League Cup		Total	
Season	Club	League	Apps	Goals	Apps	Goals	Apps	Goals	Apps	Goals
England			League		FA Cup		League Cup		Total	
2003–04	Wimbledon	First Division	9	0	0	0	1	0	10	0
2004–05	Brighton & Hove Albion	Championship	12	1	0	0	1	0	13	1
2004–05	Stevenage Borough	Conference	4	0	0	0	0	0	4	0
2005–06	Brighton & Hove Albion	Championship	11	0	0	0	1	0	12	0
2005–06	Swindon Town	League One	6	0	0	0	0	0	6	0
2006–07	Watford	Premier League	1	0	0	0	1	0	2	0
2006–07	Boston United	League Two	5	2	0	0	0	0	5	2
2006–07	Milton Keynes Dons	League Two	5	0	0	0	0	0	5	0
2008–09	Gillingham	League Two	17	0	3	0	0	0	21	0
2009–10	Barnet	League Two	45	2	3	0	1	0	51	2
2010–11	Lincoln City	League Two	22	1	3	1	1	0	26	2
2010–11	Aldershot Town	League Two	4	0	0	0	0	0	4	0
2012–	Bromley	Conference South	27	0	1	0	0	0	28	0
Total	England		167	6	10	1	6	0	187	7
Career total			167	6	10	1	6	0	187	7

Notes

- Football League Trophy results included in totals.

== Honours ==
Gillingham

- Football League Two play-offs: 2009
