= Ryan O'Neill (Northern Irish footballer) =

Northern Irish footballer (born 1990)

Personal information
- Full name: Ryan O'Neill
- Date of birth: 19 January 1990 (age 36)
- Place of birth: Dungannon, Northern Ireland
- Position: Defender

Youth career
- 2006–2008: West Ham United

Senior career*
Years	Team	Apps	(Gls)
2008–2009	West Ham United	0	(0)
2009–2010	Barnet	15	(0)
2010–2013	Dungannon Swifts	89	(6)
2013–2014	Glentoran	17	(0)
Total		121	(6)

International career
2006–2009	Northern Ireland U21	9	(2)
- * Club domestic league appearances and goals

Ryan O'Neill (born 19 January 1990) is a retired footballer from Northern Ireland.

He began his career in the youth team at West Ham United and has represented Northern Ireland at under-21 level, and is a cousin of former Barnet teammate Mark Hughes. He signed for Barnet in August 2009 and made his debut in a 1–0 away defeat to Lincoln City on 8 August 2009. O'Neill was released at the end of the season.

Ryan signed for Northern Irish Premiership and home town side Dungannon Swifts in September 2010, making his debut against Donegal Celtic.

In July 2013, O'Neill signed a 2-year contract with Irish Cup winners Glentoran. He left the club at the end of the season to move to the United States.

== Career statistics ==
Club	Season	Division	League		National Cup		League Cup		Other		Total	
Club	Season	Division	Apps	Goals	Apps	Goals	Apps	Goals	Apps	Goals	Apps	Goals
West Ham United	2008–09	Premier League	0	0	0	0	0	0	0	0	0	0
Barnet	2009–10	League Two	15	0	0	0	1	0	0	0	16	0
Total			15	0	0	0	1	0	0		16	0
Dungannon Swifts	2010–11	Premiership	25	2	0	0	0	0	0	0	25	2
Dungannon Swifts	2011–12	Premiership	32	2	4	1	0	0	0	0	36	3
Dungannon Swifts	2012–13	Premiership	32	2	0	0	0	0	0	0	32	2
Total			89	6	4	1	0	0	0		93	7
Glentoran	2013–14	Premiership	17	0	0	0	1	0	0	0	18	0
Career total			121	6	4	1	2	0	0	0	127	7
