= Elliott Charles =

English-born Grenadian footballer

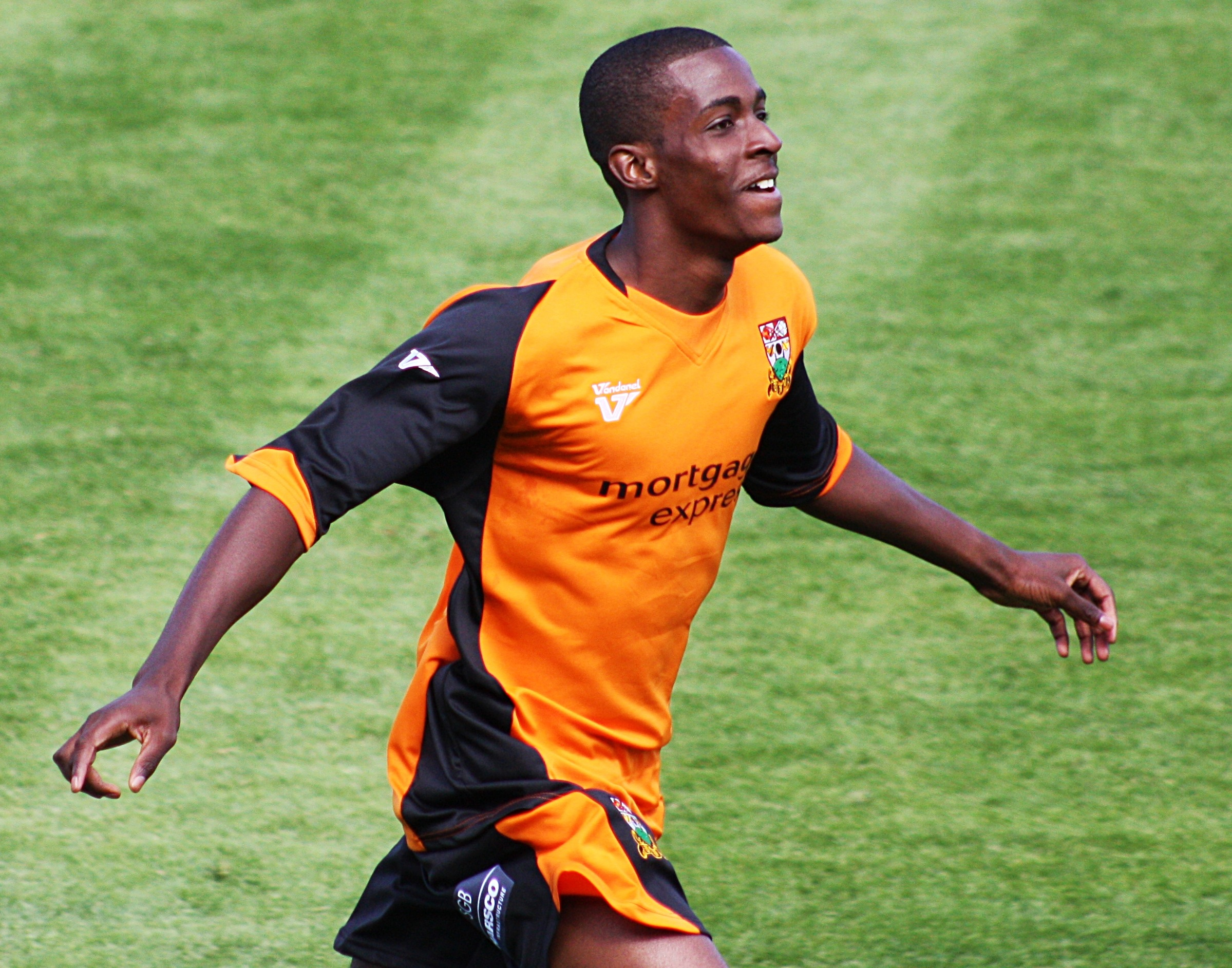
- Charles celebrating a goal against Arsenal in a pre-season friendly in 2009

Personal information
- Full name: Elliott Grant Charles
- Date of birth: 1 April 1990 (age 36)
- Place of birth: Enfield, England
- Height: 6 ft 2 in (1.88 m)
- Position: Striker

Youth career
- Welwyn Garden City
- Barnet

Senior career*
Years	Team	Apps	(Gls)
2008–2010	Barnet	8	(0)
2008	→ Farnborough (loan)	3	(0)
2009	→ Lewes (loan)	5	(0)
2009	→ Hemel Hempstead Town (loan)	6	(0)
2009	→ Ebbsfleet United (loan)	2	(0)
2009–2010	→ Havant & Waterlooville (loan)	1	(0)
2010	Kettering Town	7	(0)
2010–2011	Dover Athletic	26	(4)
2011	Concord Rangers	2	(1)
2011–2012	Hendon	24	(11)
2012–2013	Eastbourne Borough	24	(11)
2013–2014	Dover Athletic	25	(1)
2014	Eastbourne Borough	11	(1)
2014–2015	Staines Town	8	(2)
2016–2017	Metropolitan Police	7	(1)
2017	Hendon	10	(1)
2017	Ware	5	(2)
2017–2018	Hampton & Richmond Borough	10	(4)
2018	Braintree Town	2	(0)
2018	Wealdstone	5	(3)
2019	Hendon	2	(1)
Total		193	(43)

International career
2011	Grenada	2	(0)
- * Club domestic league appearances and goals as of 11:03, 20 July 2023 (UTC)

Elliott Grant Charles (born 1 April 1990) is an English-born Grenadian footballer who plays as a striker for the Grenada national football team.

== Early life ==
As a youngster Elliot attended St. Gildas Junior School. Aged 10 while playing an inter-borough tournament against St.Mary's he attracted the attention of a scout for Arsenal. He was later scrapped from their youth system. He later attended Bishop Douglass, Finchley.

== Career ==
Charles signed a three-year professional contract with Barnet in May 2008 after scoring 20 goals for the Protec U18 side. He made his debut against Brentford on 23 August 2008. In October 2008 he joined Farnborough on an initial one-month loan period. He then joined Lewes on loan in January 2009 along with Kieron St Aimie, scoring on his debut in the FA Trophy against Havant & Waterlooville. He went out on loan for the third time that season in March, joining Hemel Hempstead Town. A fourth loan spell followed in October 2009 when he joined Ebbsfleet United, before another loan spell at Havant & Waterlooville in December. On 21 January 2010, he was released by Barnet and signed for Kettering, who also released him at the end of the season.

In August 2010, Charles signed for Conference South club Dover Athletic alongside Harry Baker, Luke I'Anson and Jackson Ohakam. He was released at the end of the 2010–11 season. In September 2011, he joined Isthmian League Premier Division side Hendon after a spell with Concord Rangers.

In November 2012, Charles joined Conference South club Eastbourne Borough. He ended the season as the club's top scorer scoring 14 goals in all competitions (11 league) in 26 appearances (24 league).

Before the start of the 2013/14 season, Elliott moved along the south coast to join Eastbourne's league rivals Dover Athletic. After a season at Dover, Elliott re-signed for Eastbourne on 21 August 2014.

Charles had stints at Staines Town and Metropolitan Police, before rejoining Hendon in January 2017. After leaving at the end of the season, he joined Hampton & Richmond Borough in December 2017. Although he signed in early December, Charles had to be patient for his first action for The Beavers. He finally made his debut away to Wealdstone on New Year's Day 2018. His first start for Hampton could not have gone any better for Charles with a Hat-Trick in the first 30 minutes.

On 7 September 2018, Charles joined National League side, Braintree Town. After two appearances, he joined Wealdstone the following month. Charles joined Hendon for a third time in January 2019.

== International ==
Charles was called to play for Grenada the 2014 FIFA World Cup qualification – CONCACAF second round. He made two appearances, the first on 2 September 2011 against Belize in the 3–0 home defeat and in the 2–1 away defeat to Saint Vincent and the Grenadines on 18 September.

== Career statistics ==
=== Club ===
As of match played 5 January 2019

Appearances and goals by club, season and competition
Club	Season	League			FA Cup		League Cup		Other		Total	
Club	Season	Division	Apps	Goals	Apps	Goals	Apps	Goals	Apps	Goals	Apps	Goals
Barnet	2008–09	League Two	5	0	0	0	0	0	1 (Note: Appearance(s) in the Football League Trophy)	0	6	0
Barnet	2009–10	League Two	3	0	0	0	1	0	2	0	6	0
Barnet	Barnet total		8	0	0	0	1	0	3	0	12	0
Farnborough (loan)	2008–09	Southern League Premier Division	3	0	0	0	—		0	0	3	0
Lewes (loan)	2008–09	Conference Premier	5	0	0	0	—		0	0	5	0
Hemel Hempstead Town (loan)	2008–09	Southern League Premier Division	6	0	0	0	—		0	0	6	0
Ebbsfleet United (loan)	2009–10	Conference Premier	2	0	0	0	—		0	0	2	0
Havant & Waterlooville (loan)	2009–10	Conference South	1	0	0	0	—		1 (Note: Appearance in the FA Trophy)	0	2	0
Kettering Town	2009–10	Conference Premier	7	0	0	0	—		0	0	7	0
Dover Athletic	2010–11	Conference South	26	4	5	3	—		0	0	31	7
Concord Rangers	2011–12	Isthmian Premier Division	2	1	0	0	—		0	0	2	1
Hendon	2011–12	Isthmian Premier Division	21	11			—		5	1	26	12
Hendon	2012–13	Isthmian Premier Division	3	0			—		5	2	8	2
Hendon	Hendon total		24	11			0	0	10	3	34	14
Eastbourne Borough	2012–13	Conference South	24	11	0	0	—		2 (Note: Appearance(s) in the Sussex Senior Challenge Cup)	3	26	14
Dover Athletic	2013–14	Conference South	25	1	3	0	—		7 (Note: Five appearances and three goals in the Kent Senior Cup; two appearances in the FA Trophy)	3	35	4
Eastbourne Borough	2014–15	Conference South	11	1	3	0	—		1	0	15	1
Staines Town	2014–15	Conference South	8	2	—		—		0	0	8	2
Metropolitan Police	2016–17	Isthmian Premier Division	7	1	?	?	—		?	?	7	1
Hendon	2016–17	Isthmian Premier Division	10	1			—		2	0	12	1
Ware	2017–18	Isthmian Division One North	5	2	1	1	—		2 (Note: One appearance and one goal in the Herts Senior Cup; one appearance in the FA Trophy)	1	8	4
Hampton & Richmond Borough	2017–18	National League South	10	4	0	0	—		6 (Note: One appearance in the Middlesex Senior Cup; two appearances and three goals in the Middlesex Senior Charity Cup; three appearances in National League South play-offs)	3	16	7
Braintree Town	2018–19	National League	2	0	0	0	—		0	0	2	0
Wealdstone	2018–19	National League South	5	3	1	0	—		0	0	6	3
Wealdstone	2018–19	Southern Premier Division South	1	1	0	0	—		0	0	1	1
Career total			192	43	13	4	1	0	34	13	240	60

=== International ===
As of match played 18 September 2011

National team	Year	Apps	Goals
Grenada	2011	2	0
Total		2	0
