= Jake Cole =

English footballer (born 1985)

Personal information
- Full name: Jake Stanley Cole
- Date of birth: 11 September 1985 (age 41)
- Place of birth: Hammersmith, England
- Height: 6 ft 2 in (1.88 m)
- Position: Goalkeeper

Youth career
- –2003: Queens Park Rangers

Senior career*
Years	Team	Apps	(Gls)
2003–2009	Queens Park Rangers	6	(0)
2003–2004	→ Hayes (loan)	17	(0)
2005	→ AFC Wimbledon (loan)	6	(0)
2005	→ Farnborough Town (loan)	1	(0)
2008	→ Oxford United (loan)	5	(0)
2009	→ Barnet (loan)	10	(0)
2009–2011	Barnet	77	(0)
2011–2014	Plymouth Argyle	91	(0)
2014–2016	Woking	63	(0)
2016–2019	Aldershot Town	80	(0)
2019–2020	Maidstone United	20	(0)
2020–2022	Gloucester City	24	(0)
Total		400	(0)
- * Club domestic league appearances and goals

Jake Stanley Cole (born 11 September 1985) is an English former professional footballer who played as a goalkeeper. He previously played for Queens Park Rangers, Hayes, AFC Wimbledon, Farnborough Town, Oxford United, Barnet, Plymouth Argyle, Woking, Aldershot Town and Gloucester City.

== Career ==
Cole was born in Hammersmith, London. He was the second choice goalkeeper at Queens Park Rangers for a number of years, being understudy to Nick Culkin, Chris Day, Paul Jones, Simon Royce and Lee Camp, but was praised by John Gregory as being a model professional. He played for Hayes, AFC Wimbledon, Farnborough Town, Oxford United and Barnet on loan during his six years there. Towards the end of the 2006–07 season he became first choice goalkeeper after Lee Camp was recalled from his loan spell to Derby County.

Cole had been given the number 12 jersey for the 2007–08 season, indicating that John Gregory would be signing a number one keeper before the start of the season, with rumours focusing on the permanent signing of Lee Camp. Camp was then signed therefore limiting Cole's first team opportunities; however Cole continued to impress for Rangers' second string with manager John Gregory saying in 2007, "I have been impressed by Jake's overall attitude and ability. He is a fantastic understudy to Lee Camp."

Cole slipped further down the pecking order at QPR following the signing of Radek Černý in the summer of 2008. He was loaned to the Conference National club Oxford United for three months on 11 July 2008. In March 2009 he joined Barnet on a month-long loan.

He was released by QPR on 19 May 2009. However, he was re-signed by Barnet on a permanent basis on 6 July 2009. He won the club's Player of the Year award for the 2009–10 season after playing 52 matches and keeping 14 clean sheets. His contract was extended for the 2010–11 season in May 2010. He left Barnet at the end of the 2010–11 season. He spent time on trial with Gillingham and Plymouth Argyle in July 2011. Cole agreed a two-year contract with Argyle later that month.

At Argyle, Cole emerged as the first-choice goalkeeper ahead of club stalwart Romain Larrieu in the 2011–12 season, playing in 39 of the Pilgrims' 50 games that season, as the club scraped EFL League Two survival. Ahead of the 2012–13 season, Larrieu retired and Rene Gilmartin came in as new competition for Cole, but again he came out as first-choice, with the club nearly mirroring their performance from the previous season. The 2013–14 season was a more successful one on the pitch for Argyle, and during it Argyle re-signed Luke McCormick and so Cole found himself as the club's back-up goalkeeper, only for injuries to McCormick to see him play exactly the same number of times as McCormick that year. Cole played his last game for Argyle in a 3–3 draw with Portsmouth.

After leaving Plymouth Argyle, Cole went on to sign for Conference Premier club Woking for the 2014–15 season. In Cole's two seasons at Woking they finished 7th and then 12th in the National League before he left the Cardinals.

On 8 June 2016, Cole joined local rivals Aldershot Town, initially on a one-year contract. In Cole's first two seasons at the Shots, the club finished 5th in the National League both times, qualifying for the play-offs. In 16-17, Aldershot lost in the semi-finals 5–2 on aggregate to Tranmere Rovers, with Cole making a costly error to gift James Norwood a goal in the first-leg. In 17-18, Aldershot lost in a play-off qualifying game to Ebbsfleet United on penalties, with Cole an unused sub in that game. Cole left the Shots at the end of the 2018-19 campaign and then joined Maidstone United.

In June 2020, Cole joined Gloucester City as a player-coach.

== Career statistics ==
As of 27 March 2019

Appearances and goals by club, season and competition
Club	Season	League			FA Cup		League Cup		Other		Total	
Club	Season	Division	Apps	Goals	Apps	Goals	Apps	Goals	Apps	Goals	Apps	Goals
Queens Park Rangers	2003–04	Second Division	0	0	0	0	0	0	0	0	0	0
Queens Park Rangers	2004–05	Championship	0	0	0	0	0	0	—		0	0
Queens Park Rangers	2005–06	Championship	3	0	0	0	0	0	—		3	0
Queens Park Rangers	2006–07	Championship	3	0	0	0	2	0	—		5	0
Queens Park Rangers	2007–08	Championship	0	0	0	0	0	0	—		0	0
Queens Park Rangers	2008–09	Championship	0	0	0	0	0	0	—		0	0
Queens Park Rangers	Total		6	0	0	0	2	0	0	0	8	0
Hayes (loan)	2003–04	Isthmian League Premier Division	17	0			—				17	0
AFC Wimbledon (loan)	2004–05	Isthmian League Division One	6	0	—		—		1 (Note: Appearance in Isthmian League Cup)	0	7	0
Farnborough Town (loan)	2004–05	Conference National	1	0	—		—		—		1	0
Oxford United (loan)	2008–09	Conference Premier	5	0	—		—		—		5	0
Barnet (loan)	2008–09	League Two	10	0	—		—		—		10	0
Barnet	2009–10	League Two	46	0	3	0	1	0	2 (Note: Appearance(s) in Football League Trophy)	0	52	0
Barnet	2010–11	League Two	31	0	2	0	1	0	1	0	35	0
Barnet	Total		87	0	5	0	2	0	3	0	97	0
Plymouth Argyle	2011–12	League Two	37	0	1	0	1	0	0	0	39	0
Plymouth Argyle	2012–13	League Two	34	0	0	0	2	0	0	0	36	0
Plymouth Argyle	2013–14	League Two	20	0	5	0	1	0	2	0	28	0
Plymouth Argyle	Total		91	0	6	0	4	0	2	0	103	0
Woking	2014–15	Conference Premier	19	0	2	0	—		4 (Note: Appearances in FA Trophy)	0	25	0
Woking	2015–16	National League	44	0	1	0	—		4	0	49	0
Woking	Total		63	0	3	0	—		8	0	74	0
Aldershot Town	2016–17	National League	37	0	0	0	—		2 (Note: Appearances in National League play-offs)	0	39	0
Aldershot Town	2017–18	National League	21	0	1	0	—		1	0	23	0
Aldershot Town	2018–19	National League	22	0	0	0	—		0	0	22	0
Aldershot Town	Total		80	0	1	0	—		3	0	84	0
Maidstone United	2018–19	National League South	20	0	5	0	—		3	0	28	0
Career total			376	0	20	0	8	0	20	0	424	0

== Honours ==
Individual

- Barnet Player of the Year: 2009–10
- Aldershot Town Player of the Year: 2016–17
