= Albert Adomah =

English-Ghanaian footballer (born 1987)

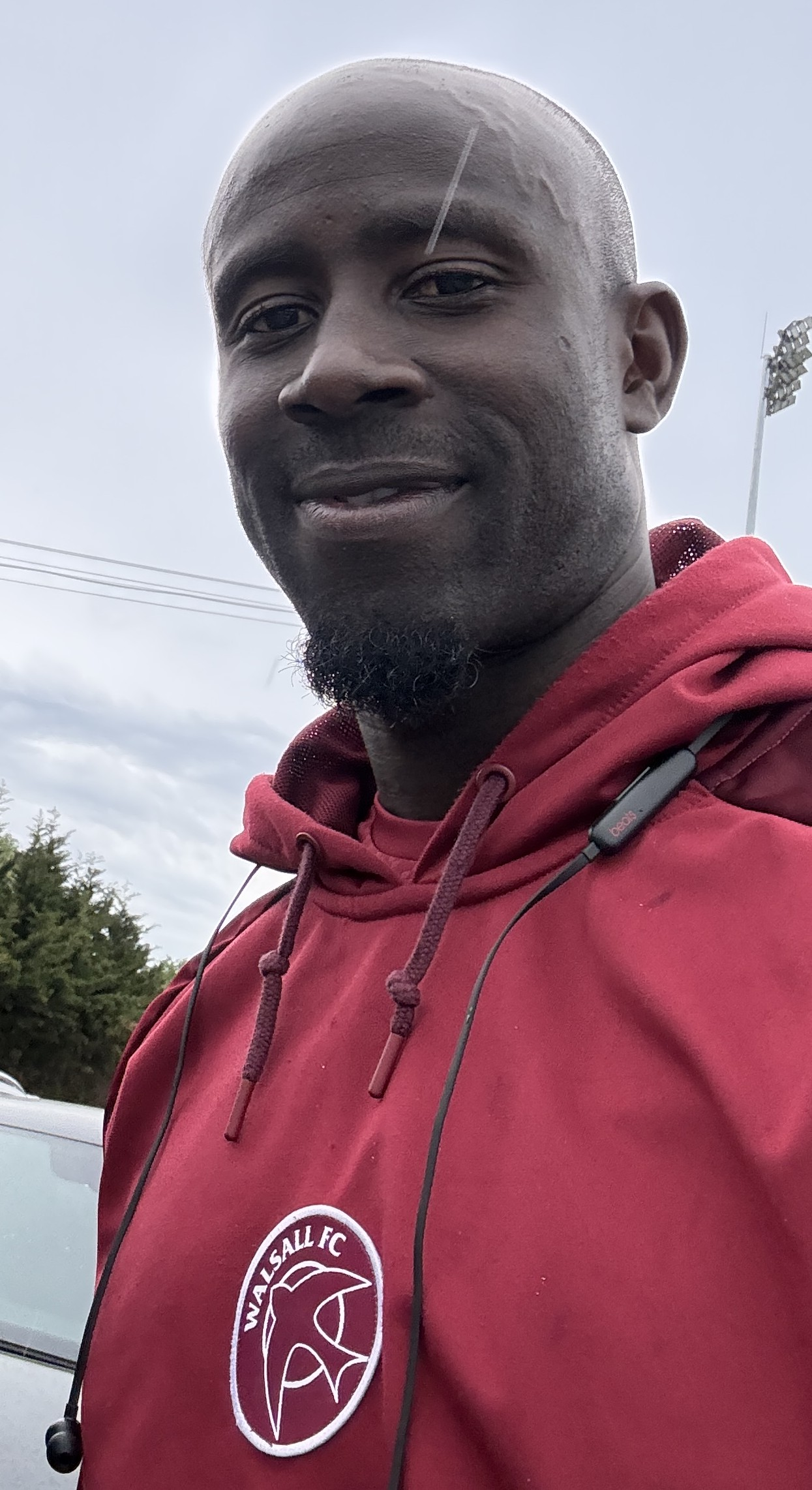
- Adomah in 2026

Personal information
- Full name: Albert Danquah Adomah
- Date of birth: 13 December 1987 (age 38)
- Place of birth: Lambeth, England
- Height: 6 ft 1 in (1.85 m)
- Position: Winger

Team information
- Current team: Walsall
- Number: 37

Youth career
- 2004–2005: Old Meadonians

Senior career*
Years	Team	Apps	(Gls)
2006–2008	Harrow Borough	69	(14)
2008–2010	Barnet	112	(19)
2010–2013	Bristol City	131	(17)
2013–2016	Middlesbrough	130	(23)
2016–2019	Aston Villa	113	(21)
2019–2020	Nottingham Forest	24	(2)
2020	→ Cardiff City (loan)	9	(0)
2020–2024	Queens Park Rangers	121	(6)
2024–	Walsall	92	(11)

International career^{‡}
2011–2018	Ghana	19	(2)
- * Club domestic league appearances and goals as of 10:21, 27 September 2026 (UTC) ‡ National team caps and goals as of 14:01, 15 July 2019 (UTC)

Albert Danquah Adomah (born 13 December 1987) is a professional footballer who plays as a right winger for EFL League Two club Walsall. Born in England, he represented the Ghana national team. Noted for his longevity and consistency, he has made more appearances in the second-tier than any other player, and is the only player to have played over 100 matches for 6 different football league clubs.

He is both a Ghanaian and a British national. His previous clubs are Harrow Borough, Barnet, Bristol City, Middlesbrough, Aston Villa, Nottingham Forest and Queens Park Rangers.

== Club career ==
=== Harrow Borough ===
After a spell at Chiswick-based amateur side Old Meadonians as a teenager, Adomah began his career playing semi-professional football with Isthmian League Premier Division club Harrow Borough, while studying Level 2 Decorative Finishing and Industrial Painting at the College of North West London.

=== Barnet ===
In January 2008, Adomah joined League Two side Barnet. Barnet agreed to play Harrow in a pre-season friendly.

He scored on his Football League debut for Barnet in a 2–1 win over Hereford United at Edgar Street on 30 January 2008. In March, he scored two first half goals in a 4–1 win over Shrewsbury Town and scored in two successive games, against Chester City and Lincoln City. He made a total of 22 league appearances in the 2007–08 season, scoring five goals and helping Barnet to a 12th-place finish in League Two. Adomah was voted as Barnet's Young Player of the Year for the 2008–09 season by the Barnet Supporters' association.

In July 2009, Adomah was linked with a transfer to Championship side Blackpool. On the final day of the transfer window, Barnet chairman Tony Kleanthous revealed that talks with Blackpool broke down two hours before the deadline and that he had also turned down offers from Norwich City and Watford. It was later reported that Adomah could still move to Blackpool on loan, with a view to a permanent move in January 2010.

On 6 October 2009, it was announced that football commentator John Motson had sponsored Adomah at Barnet.

On 12 November 2009, Adomah turned down Barnet's offer of a new contract. His agent, Tony Finnigan, confirmed that Adomah wanted to leave, saying, "Barnet made an excellent offer...but he deserves a run at a higher level." Tony Kleanthous said that he would not stand in Adomah's way if they received an acceptable offer. On 13 May 2010, Barnet made a bid to keep Adomah at the club by offering a twenty-percent increase on their original contract offer, which would have made him the highest paid player in the club's history, but on 28 May it was confirmed that Adomah would not be signing a new contract. He had played 120 games for Barnet scoring 20 times.

=== Bristol City ===
On 1 July 2010, he agreed to join Bristol City on a three-year deal, with an initial fee of £150,000 being set later by a tribunal. After impressing during pre-season, Steve Coppell named Adomah in the starting line-up for City's first game of the season at home to Millwall, a game which they lost 3–0. He continued to put in good performances in the league, and instantly became a fans' favourite through his exciting style of play and his humorous interviews on the club website. He scored his first goal for City during a 3–3 draw with Barnsley at Ashton Gate. After a few below-par performances, Adomah was taken off at half time during City's 4–0 win away at Preston North End, and reaped the rewards as his side then went on a winning run with Adomah being instrumental on his return to the side. He scored his fourth goal of the season in a 2–1 win against in form Portsmouth, and ended the season top of the club's assists chart with 12 to his name in all competitions.

Adomah was given the Player of the Season award for Bristol City for the 2010–11 campaign, days after agreeing a new three-year contract which would keep him at the club until 2014.

The 25-year-old Ghana international had made it clear to City that he did not wish to play in League One following their relegation from the Championship, following this, Wigan Athletic made two bids for the winger, both of which were rejected; Adomah submitted a transfer request which was refused.

The start of the 2013 season saw Adomah rested for Bristol City's campaign opener.

=== Middlesbrough ===
On 6 August 2013, Adomah was announced to be having a medical at Middlesbrough's Rockliffe Park training ground. On 8 August 2013 Adomah completed his move to Middlesbrough for an undisclosed fee believed to be in the region of £1,000,000.

He was issued the number twenty-seven squad number. Adomah made his debut for Boro in their 1–0 victory over Charlton Athletic on 10 August 2013.

Adomah scored his first goal for the club on 14 September 2013 in a 3–1 loss to Ipswich Town. He scored again on 5 October 2013 in a 4–1 home win over Yeovil Town and twice more on 19 October 2013 in a 3–2 defeat at Barnsley. A week after grabbing a brace against Barnsley, Adomah once again scored twice in a 4–0 victory over Doncaster Rovers. Adomah was nominated for the Championship's Player of the Month for October after several impressive performances and scoring 5 goals in 4 games.

Adomah reached the play-off final after a 5–1 aggregate win over Brentford, including Adomah scoring in the semi-final but they lost the decisive match 2–0 to Norwich City at Wembley Stadium in the final. The following season, Adomah earned promotion as Middlesbrough finished runners-up in the EFL Championship. He played 2 games for Middlesbrough in the Premier League during the beginning of August 2016 prior to his move to Villa.

=== Aston Villa ===
On 31 August 2016, Adomah signed for Aston Villa on transfer deadline day for an undisclosed fee, swapping directions with Adama Traoré who went the other way. He scored his first goal for Aston Villa in a 3–1 win against Cardiff City on 26 November 2016. He scored two goals in a 2–2 draw at home against Preston North End. He enjoyed a good run of form as he was among the second best in terms of assists within the championship assisting 11 goals compared to Conor Hourihane's 14 assists in the 2016–17 EFL Championship season.

During the 2017–18 Aston Villa F.C. season Adomah scored 15 goals, finishing the club's top scorer, to help Villa secure a play-off place and defeat his old side Middlesbrough in the two semi-finals to reach the final, playing in the final, as Villa lost 1–0 to Fulham in the final and thus missed out on promotion to the Premier League.

On 28 April 2019, after coming on as a substitute against Leeds United, Adomah was allowed to equalise unchallenged by the Leeds coach Marcelo Bielsa. This occurred following a large confrontation between the opposing sides, following Leeds continuing to play and score with Villa players wanting the ball out of play because of an injury.

He was released by Aston Villa at the end of the 2018–19 season.

=== Nottingham Forest ===
On 10 July 2019, Adomah signed a two-year deal with Nottingham Forest. He scored his first goal for Forest in a 1–1 draw with Charlton Athletic on 21 August 2019.

On 2 October 2020, Adomah and Forest mutually agreed to terminate his contract with the club.

==== Cardiff City (loan) ====
Adomah joined Cardiff City on a six-month loan deal on 31 January 2020.

=== Queens Park Rangers ===
On 5 October 2020, following his departure from Nottingham Forest, Adomah signed for boyhood club Queens Park Rangers on a two-year deal. He scored his first goal for QPR, a late winner, in a 2–1 win over Watford on 1 February 2021.

On 15 January 2022, Adomah played the duration of his QPR's 1–0 top-of-the-table victory against West Bromwich Albion, his 456th appearance in the second tier, making him the record outfield appearance holder in Championship history. He became the record holder with his 525th appearance on 26 April 2024, over-taking Lee Camp.

On 2 May 2024, the club announced the player would leave the club in the summer when his contract expired.

=== Walsall ===
On 23 July 2024, Adomah signed a one-year contract with League Two club Walsall, following a successful trial. He scored his first goal in a 4–0 away win against Swindon Town.

On 24 June 2025, the club announced he had signed a new one-year contract. On 2 September 2025 Adomah scored his 100th career goal in a 3–1 win against Shrewsbury Town.

== International career ==
Adomah made his international debut when coming on as a substitute for Ghana in their 1–0 defeat against Brazil on 5 September 2011 at Craven Cottage.

He broke through the national team to book his place in Ghana's provisional 26-man squad for the 2013 African Cup of Nations. On 9 January, Adomah made the starting team, was given the number 10 shirt and was told he would play a big role for the national team. He was selected and went to 2014 FIFA World Cup in Brazil where he played in one game for Ghana.

== Career statistics ==
=== Club ===
As of match played 13 October 2026

Appearances and goals by club, season and competition
Club	Season	League			FA Cup		League Cup		Other		Total	
Club	Season	Division	Apps	Goals	Apps	Goals	Apps	Goals	Apps	Goals	Apps	Goals
Harrow Borough	2005–06	Isthmian Premier Division	2	0	0	0	—		1 (Note: Appearance in Middlesex Senior Cup)	0	3	0
Harrow Borough	2006–07	Isthmian Premier Division	42	8	2	2	—		8 (Note: One appearance in FA Trophy, one appearance in Isthmian League Cup, two appearances and one goal in Middlesex Senior Cup, four appearances in Middlesex Charity Cup)	1	52	11
Harrow Borough	2007–08	Isthmian Premier Division	25	6	1	0	—		4 (Note: One appearance and one goal in FA Trophy, one appearance in Isthmian League Cup, two appearances and one goal in Middlesex Senior Cup)	2	30	8
Harrow Borough	Total		69	14	3	2	—		13	3	85	19
Barnet	2007–08	League Two	22	5	0	0	0	0	0	0	22	5
Barnet	2008–09	League Two	45	9	2	1	1	0	1 (Note: Appearance in Football League Trophy)	0	49	10
Barnet	2009–10	League Two	45	5	2	0	1	0	1	0	49	5
Barnet	Total		112	19	4	1	2	0	2	0	120	20
Bristol City	2010–11	Championship	46	5	1	0	1	0	—		48	5
Bristol City	2011–12	Championship	45	5	1	0	1	0	—		47	5
Bristol City	2012–13	Championship	40	7	0	0	1	0	—		41	7
Bristol City	Total		131	17	2	0	3	0	—		136	17
Middlesbrough	2013–14	Championship	42	12	1	0	0	0	—		43	12
Middlesbrough	2014–15	Championship	43	5	2	0	3	0	3 (Note: Appearances in Championship play-offs)	1	51	6
Middlesbrough	2015–16	Championship	43	6	1	0	3	2	0	0	47	8
Middlesbrough	2016–17	Premier League	2	0	0	0	0	0	0	0	2	0
Middlesbrough	Total		130	23	4	0	6	2	3	1	143	26
Aston Villa	2016–17	Championship	38	3	1	0	0	0	0	0	39	3
Aston Villa	2017–18	Championship	39	14	0	0	2	1	3	0	44	15
Aston Villa	2018–19	Championship	36	4	1	0	2	0	3	0	42	4
Aston Villa	Total		113	21	2	0	4	1	6	0	125	22
Nottingham Forest	2019–20	Championship	24	2	1	0	2	1	0	0	27	3
Cardiff City (loan)	2019–20	Championship	9	0	0	0	0	0	0	0	9	0
Queens Park Rangers	2020–21	Championship	34	2	0	0	0	0	–		34	2
Queens Park Rangers	2021–22	Championship	33	2	2	0	3	0	–		38	2
Queens Park Rangers	2022–23	Championship	38	2	1	0	1	0	–		40	2
Queens Park Rangers	2023–24	Championship	16	0	1	0	1	0	–		18	0
Queens Park Rangers	Total		121	6	4	0	5	0	0	0	130	6
Walsall	2024–25	League Two	45	5	2	0	3	0	7 (Note: Four appearances in EFL Trophy, three appearances in League Two play-offs)	0	54	5
Walsall	2025–26	League Two	42	6	3	0	1	0	5 (Note: Appearances in EFL Trophy)	2	51	8
Walsall	2026–27	League Two	5	0	0	0	1	0	2 (Note: Appearance in EFL Trophy)	0	8	0
Walsall	Total		89	11	5	0	5	0	14	2	113	13
Career total			798	113	25	3	27	4	38	6	888	126

=== International ===
As of 15 July 2019

Ghana
Year	Apps	Goals
2011	2	0
2012	1	0
2013	9	1
2014	4	0
2015	2	1
2016	0	0
2017	0	0
2018	1	0
Total	19	2

List of international goals scored by Albert Adomah
No.	Date	Venue	Opponent	Score	Result	Competition	Ref.
1	13 January 2013	Zayed Sports City Stadium, Abu Dhabi, UAE	Tunisia	4–2	4–2	Friendly	
2	14 October 2015	Robert F. Kennedy Memorial Stadium, Washington, D.C., United States	Canada	1–1	1–1	Friendly	

== Honours ==
Middlesbrough

- Football League Championship second-place promotion: 2015–16

Aston Villa

- EFL Championship play-offs: 2019

Individual

- Barnet Young Player of the Year: 2008–09
- Bristol City Player of the Year: 2010–11
- PFA Community Champion Award: 2022–23
