= Nicky Nicolau =

British footballer

Personal information
- Full name: Nicky George Nicolau
- Date of birth: 12 October 1983 (age 43)
- Place of birth: St Pancras, England
- Height: 5 ft 8 in (1.73 m)
- Position: Midfielder

Youth career
- ?–2002: Arsenal

Senior career*
Years	Team	Apps	(Gls)
2002–2004	Arsenal	0	(0)
2004	→ Southend United (loan)	9	(1)
2004–2005	Southend United	22	(1)
2005–2006	Swindon Town	5	(0)
2006	→ Hereford United (loan)	10	(1)
2006–2009	Barnet	81	(4)
2009–2010	Woking	21	(1)
2010	Dover Athletic	11	(1)
2010–2011	Boreham Wood	15	(3)
2011–2013	Lincoln City	45	(4)
2013–2014	Chelmsford City	29	(0)
2014	Welling United	0	(0)
2014–2015	Chelmsford City	14	(2)
2015	Bishop's Stortford	0	(0)

International career
- Cyprus U17
- Cyprus U19
	Cyprus U21	3	(0)
- * Club domestic league appearances and goals

Nicky George Nicolau (born 12 October 1983) is a former footballer who played as a midfielder. Born in England, he was a Cyprus youth international.

== Early career ==
Born in St Pancras, London, Nicolau started his career with Arsenal, winning the FA Youth Cup in 2001, but never broke into the first team after spending 10 years at the club. He has been capped by Cyprus at U-17, U-19 and U-21 level, with 3 caps for the U-21s.

== Career ==
On 25 March 2004 he joined Southend United on loan, making his Football League debut two days later in the club's 2–1 victory at Carlisle United. Having impressed in his loan spell, in May 2004 he agreed a one-year contract to join the club on a permanent basis. In the 2004–05 season, Nicolau helped Southend reach a second consecutive Football League Trophy final, and win promotion from League Two via the playoffs he was offered a new one-year contract with the club. However, he turned the offer down hoping to improve the terms of the offer which were at the same rate of pay as his previous contract. After five weeks of impasse, Southend United withdrew the offer and Nicolau signed for Swindon Town the following day. He had a loan spell at Hereford United where he made 11 appearances, scoring 1 goal and was released by Swindon at the end of the 2005–06 season.

Nicolau spent the following season at Barnet, and was released by the club after one season, before manager Paul Fairclough changed his mind and decided to offer Nicolau a new contract. He left the club at the end of the 2007–08 season after turning down a new contract. After a trial at Brighton & Hove Albion, he moved on trial with Grimsby Town in August 2008 and played in a behind closed doors friendly against Winterton Rangers but despite impressing in the game, manager Alan Buckley decided to let Nicolau leave the club the following day. Nicolau re-signed for the Bees in September 2008, turning down an offer from Omonia Nicosia in Cyprus as he would have to complete national service, before leaving the club for a third time at the end of the season.

In September 2009 he joined Woking on a non-contract basis, before signing a contract until the end of the season shortly after. In August 2010, he signed for Dover Athletic of the Conference South, before joining Boreham Wood in November.

On 12 July 2011, he signed a one-year contract with Lincoln City. He was released at the end of the 2012–13 season.

On 29 May 2013, he signed for Conference South club Chelmsford City.

== Honours ==
Arsenal

- FA Youth Cup: 2001

Southend United

- Football League Two play-offs: 2005
