= Jérémy De Magalhaes =

French footballer (born 1983)

Personal information
- Full name: Jérémy De Magalhaes
- Date of birth: 21 November 1983 (age 42)
- Place of birth: Ivry-sur-Seine, France
- Height: 1.84 m (6 ft 1/2 in)
- Position: Defender

Senior career*
Years	Team	Apps	(Gls)
2001–2007	Laval B	71	(4)
2002–2007	Laval	76	(1)
2007–2008	Cannes	22	(0)
2008–2009	Barnet	4	(0)
2009	L'Entente SSG		
2010–2011	Cannes	17	(0)
2011–2012	Martigues	23	(1)
2012–2014	Hyères	54	(1)
- * Club domestic league appearances and goals as of 22:19, 11 February 2017 (UTC)

Jérémy De Magalhaes (born 21 November 1983 in Ivry-sur-Seine, Val-de-Marne) is a French footballer. He has played football in the second and third divisions in France for Stade Lavallois and AS Cannes. He went on trial at Barnet in July 2008 and initially rejected an offer of a contract but returned to the Bees in August to sign with the club. However, he had problems of injury, only making four appearances, and his persistent injury led him to be released before the end of the season in April. In July 2010, he returned to AS Cannes. After a one-year stint at Cannes, he signed with FC Martigues in the Championnat National in July 2011. In July 2012, he joined amateur club Hyères FC.
