= Daniel Leach =

Australian soccer player

Personal information
- Full name: Daniel James Leach
- Date of birth: 5 January 1986 (age 40)
- Place of birth: Redcliffe, Australia
- Height: 6 ft 2 in (1.88 m)
- Position: Defender

Youth career
- 2002-2003: Queensland Academy of Sport
- Brisbane Toro
- Brisbane Strikers
- 2005–2008: Oregon State Beavers

Senior career*
Years	Team	Apps	(Gls)
2004	North Star		
2004	Brisbane Strikers		
2009	Portland Timbers U23s	10	(2)
2009–2012	Barnet	37	(2)
2010	→ Dover Athletic (loan)	12	(0)
Total		59	(4)

International career
- Australia U17 Pool
- * Club domestic league appearances and goals

Daniel Leach (born 5 January 1986) is an Australian former footballer who last played for Football League Two club Barnet as a defender.

== Career ==
He attended St. Joseph's Nudgee College in Virginia, Queensland, and played state football for Queensland. He moved on to the Queensland Academy of Sport Football Program, and also played for Brisbane Strikers. During this time he was also called up to the Australia under-17 pool after winning the u16 national championships with Queensland. He then took an extended break from football, moving to London, England, and later to the United States, where he joined Oregon State University. He also played amateur football for Portland Timbers U23.

In July 2009, he played in Barnet's friendly against Arsenal, and signed for the Bees on a one-year deal a few days later. In February 2010, he joined Conference South side Dover Athletic on a one-month loan deal. Leach was released by Barnet at the end of the 2009–10 season, but remained on trial at the club under new manager Mark Stimson and signed a new contract in July 2010. He scored his first goal for Barnet against Crewe Alexandra in a 2–1 victory. In January 2012, he was forced to retire from playing due to a knee injury.

== After football ==
After his retirement from football, Leach studied at the University of the Arts in London, where he earned a Masters degree in documentary film.

== Career statistics ==
Appearances and goals by club, season and competition
Club	Season	League			FA Cup		League Cup		Other		Total	
Club	Season	Division	Apps	Goals	Apps	Goals	Apps	Goals	Apps	Goals	Apps	Goals
Barnet	2009–10	League Two	13	0	1	0	1	0	1 (Note: Appearance(s) in Football League Trophy)	0	16	0
Barnet	2010–11	League Two	14	1	0	0	1	0	0	0	15	1
Barnet	2011–12	League Two	10	1	0	0	0	0	1	0	11	1
Barnet	Total		37	2	1	0	2	0	2	0	42	2
Dover Athletic (loan)	2009–10	Conference South	12	0	0	0	0	0	0	0	12	0
Career total			49	2	1	0	2	0	2	0	54	2
