= Ian Hendon =

English footballer (born 1971)

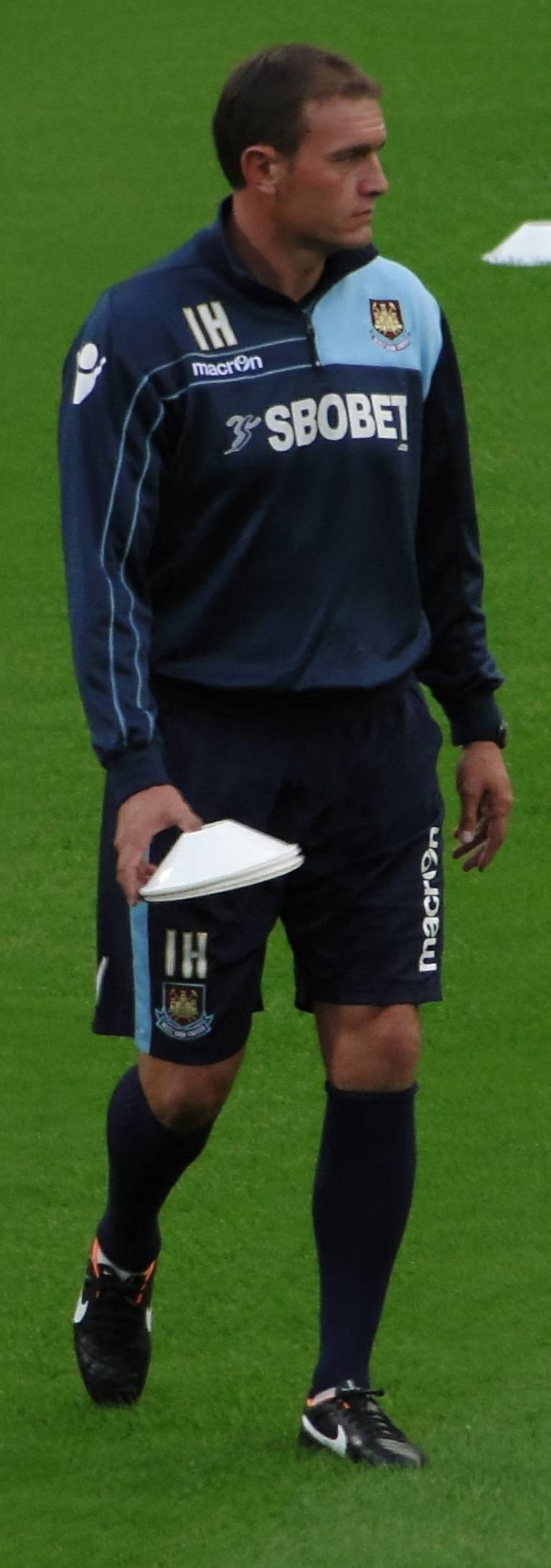
- Hendon with West Ham United

Personal information
- Full name: Ian Michael Hendon
- Date of birth: 5 December 1971 (age 54)
- Place of birth: Ilford, England
- Height: 6 ft 0 in (1.83 m)
- Position: Defender

Youth career
- 1981–1989: Tottenham Hotspur

Senior career*
Years	Team	Apps	(Gls)
1989–1993	Tottenham Hotspur	4	(0)
1992	→ Portsmouth (loan)	4	(0)
1992	→ Leyton Orient (loan)	6	(0)
1993	→ Barnsley (loan)	6	(0)
1993–1997	Leyton Orient	131	(5)
1995	→ Birmingham City (loan)	4	(0)
1997–1999	Notts County	82	(6)
1999–2000	Northampton Town	60	(3)
2000–2003	Sheffield Wednesday	49	(2)
2002–2003	→ Barnet (loan)	4	(1)
2003	Peterborough United	7	(1)
2003–2009	Barnet	142	(20)
Total		499	(38)

International career
1992–1993	England U21	7	(0)

Managerial career
- 2004: Barnet (caretaker)
- 2008–2010: Barnet
- 2010: Dover Athletic
- 2011–2012: West Ham United Under-23
- 2015–2016: Leyton Orient
- 2019–2020: Europa Point
- 2021: Waterford
- * Club domestic league appearances and goals

Ian Michael Hendon (born 5 December 1971) is an English football manager and former player who played as a defender.

As a player, Hendon began his career at Tottenham Hotspur, winning the FA Youth Cup in 1990 and representing England Under-21 seven times. He went on to play for clubs including Leyton Orient, Notts County, Northampton Town, Sheffield Wednesday, and Barnet, being named in the PFA Third Division Team of the Year on three occasions.

In management, Hendon served as manager of Barnet, Leyton Orient, Dover Athletic, Europa Point and Waterford, among other roles.

== Playing career ==
Hendon was born in Ilford, Greater London. Primarily a right-back but sometimes deployed in the centre or in midfield, he began his career with Tottenham Hotspur, winning the FA Youth Cup in 1990. He made his first-team debut in 1989, and made seven appearances for the club over the next four years, also representing England Under-21 seven times. He was an unused substitute in the 1991 FA Charity Shield.

While with Spurs Hendon had loan spells with Portsmouth, Leyton Orient and Barnsley before joining Orient on a permanent basis in August 1993. He spent three and a half years at Brisbane Road, with a brief loan spell at Birmingham City in 1995.

He later played for Notts County, Northampton Town, Sheffield Wednesday and Peterborough United before joining then Football Conference side Barnet in 2003, having been on loan there six months previously. He was briefly joint caretaker manager at Barnet with Danny Maddix between the departure of Martin Allen and the arrival of Paul Fairclough.

Reuniting with his mentor Peter Shreeves, who had coached him at Tottenham and Sheffield Wednesday, he captained the club in their return to the Football League in his second season, and remained a key player for four years. At the end of the 2006–07 season, Hendon was initially not offered a new playing contract by Barnet, but was given the chance to join Paul Fairclough's coaching staff. Nevertheless, he featured in the early fixtures of 2007–08, before dropping back as new players arrived. He remained registered as a player until the end of the 2008–09 season when he retired as a player to concentrate solely on management.

As a player Hendon featured in the PFA Third Division Team of the Year three times, once each with Leyton Orient (1996–97), Notts County (1997–98) and Northampton Town (1999–00).

== Managerial career ==
Following Paul Fairclough's step-down after the 3–0 Boxing Day defeat to Aldershot Town, Hendon was asked to take over as caretaker manager of Barnet. Fairclough's last game was a 2–0 win at A.F.C. Bournemouth, leaving the side with 19 points from their 23 league games. Performances improved under Hendon, and some adept loan signings including Paul Furlong, Matt Lockwood, Jake Cole and Yannick Bolasie helped to drag The Bees away from the relegation battle and achieve safety with four games to spare.

He declared his desire to take the job permanently and was given the job on a two-year deal in April 2009. The Bees started the 2009–10 season in superb form and were top of the league at one point, but Hendon was sacked on 28 April 2010 after a disastrous run of form left the Bees in serious relegation trouble. The last game of Hendon's reign was a 1–0 defeat to Accrington Stanley. On 28 May 2010, he was appointed the manager of Conference South side Dover Athletic, but just 18 days later resigned from the club to become assistant manager to his former Bees teammate Andy Hessenthaler at Gillingham. Hessenthaler had been his predecessor as Dover manager. In July 2011 he was appointed, by new manager Sam Allardyce, as development coach at West Ham United. In December 2012, he was promoted to the role of first-team coach following the departure of Wally Downes.

On 28 May 2015, it was announced Hendon would be returning to Brisbane Road as Leyton Orient's new manager, replacing Fabio Liverani following the club's relegation to League Two. Following a poor run of results, Hendon was sacked in January 2016.

After a spell as assistant manager at Ebbsfleet United, he took over as manager of Europa Point in Gibraltar, on 26 November 2019, following the departure of Allen Bula. Hendon's appointment saw a significant upturn in results, with 7 wins in 12 games, only for the season to be voided in May 2020 by the onset of the COVID-19 pandemic.

In June 2021 Hendon was reportedly offered a role as first team coach at Southend United, but on 24 November 2021, it was announced that Hendon had been appointed manager of League of Ireland Premier Division club Waterford. His appointment came just days after they had sacked their manager Marc Bircham, leaving Hendon with just 48 hours and two training sessions to prepare for their final game of the season, a crucial Promotion/relegation playoff Final vs League of Ireland First Division side UCD.

== Managerial statistics ==
For Barnet (permanent spell) and Leyton Orient:

As of 29 November 2021

Managerial record by team and tenure
Team	From	To	Record				
Team	From	To	P	W	D	L	Win %
Barnet (joint caretaker)	23 March 2004	30 March 2004	1	0	1	0	0.0
Barnet	28 December 2008	28 April 2010	74	21	21	32	28.4
Dover Athletic	28 May 2010	15 June 2010	0	0	0	0	—
Leyton Orient	28 May 2015	18 January 2016	31	10	11	10	32.3
Europa Point	26 November 2019	3 May 2020	12	7	3	2	58.3
Waterford	24 November 2021	27 November 2021	1	0	0	1	0.0
Total			119	38	36	45	31.9

== Honours ==
=== Player ===
Tottenham Hotspur

- FA Charity Shield: 1991
- FA Youth Cup: 1989–90

Notts County

- Football League Third Division: 1997–98

Barnet

- Conference National: 2004–05

Individual

- PFA Team of the Year: 1996–97 Third Division, 1997–98 Third Division, 1999–2000 Third Division

=== Manager ===
Individual

- Football League Two Manager of the Month: August 2015
