= John O'Flynn =

Irish association footballer

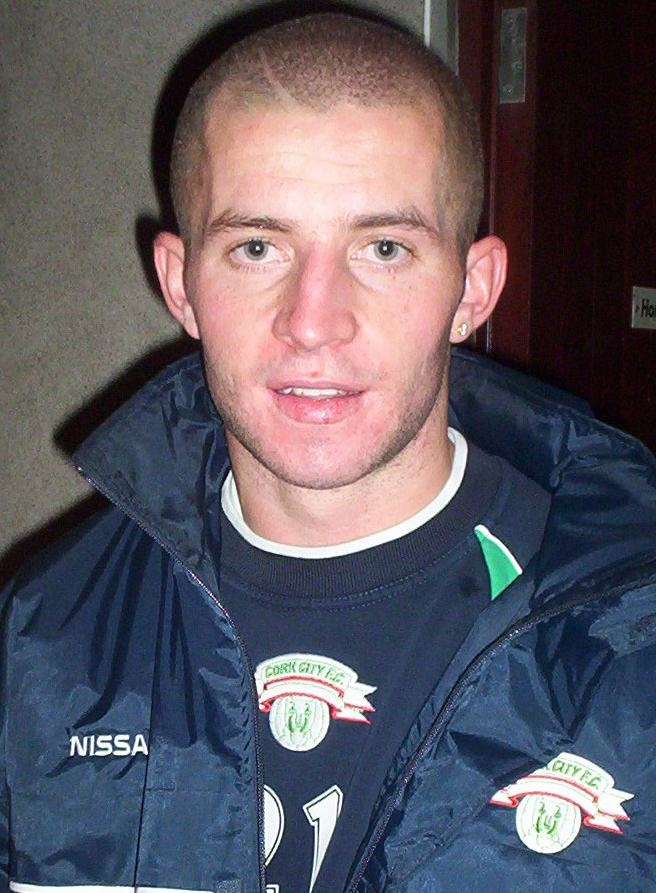

Personal information
- Full name: John O'Flynn
- Date of birth: 11 July 1982 (age 44)
- Place of birth: Cobh, Ireland
- Position: Forward

Youth career
- 2000–2002: Peterborough United

Senior career*
Years	Team	Apps	(Gls)
2001–2002	Peterborough United	0	(0)
2001	→ Cambridge City (loan)	9	(1)
2001–2002	→ Bedford Town (loan)	13	(2)
2002–2008	Cork City	136	(62)
2008–2010	Barnet	70	(34)
2010–2014	Exeter City	123	(22)
2014–2015	Cork City	28	(3)
2016–2017	Limerick	30	(13)
2018	Finn Harps	22	(2)
Total		431	(139)

International career
2002–2003	Republic of Ireland U21	7	(3)
- * Club domestic league appearances and goals

John O'Flynn (born 11 July 1982) is a retired Irish professional footballer who played as a striker. He previously played with Barnet, Exeter City, Cork City, Limerick and Finn Harps.

== Playing career ==
=== Club ===
==== Peterborough United ====
O'Flynn began his career as a trainee with Peterborough United, where he has loan spells with Cambridge City and Bedford Town

==== Cork City ====
O'Flynn spent six years with Cork City, winning the League of Ireland and FAI Cup.

==== Barnet ====
In 2008, O'Flynn returned to England to play for Barnet. O'Flynn endeared himself to Barnet fans and was likened to club legend Giuliano Grazioli by former manager Paul Fairclough for his goalscoring ability. He was voted Barnet FC Player of the Season in 2008–9 by the clubs' supporters.

On 1 February 2010, transfer deadline day, he rejected a £100,000 move to Shrewsbury Town.

On 1 July 2010, he joined Bristol City on trial, after turning down a new contract offer from Barnet. On 20 July 2010, O'Flynn left Ashton Gate after not being offered a permanent contract.

==== Exeter City ====
On 23 July 2010, O'Flynn signed a two-year contract with Exeter City. After two seasons in League One, he signed his second contract with Exeter in July 2012.

O'Flynn was released by the club on 8 May 2014 after scoring 25 goals in 133 appearances over four seasons at St James Park.

==== Return to Cork City ====
On 1 July 2014 O'Flynn signed back for his former club until the end of the season.

==== Limerick ====
At the end of the 2015 season, O'Flynn joined Cork City's Munster rivals Limerick in the SSE Airtricity First Division, and scored some key goals in their promotion-winning campaign. After two seasons at the club, O'Flynn left Limerick at the end of the 2017 season.

==== Finn Harps ====
O'Flynn was announced as signed for recently relegated League of Ireland First Division club Finn Harps F.C. on 26 January 2018 on a one-year deal. He left the club again at the end of 2018.

== Honours ==
Cork City

- League of Ireland
  - Champions: 2005
- FAI Cup
  - Winners: 2007

Limerick

- League of Ireland First Division
  - Champions: 2016
