= Kenny Gillet =

French footballer (born 1986)

Personal information
- Full name: Kenny Lego Gillet
- Date of birth: 3 January 1986 (age 40)
- Place of birth: Bordeaux, France
- Position: Left back

Youth career
- 2000–2002: Cannes
- 2002–2004: Caen

Senior career*
Years	Team	Apps	(Gls)
2004–2007	Caen B	70	(0)
2007–2010	Barnet	100	(0)
2010–2012	Inverness Caledonian Thistle	36	(0)
2012–2014	AEK Larnaca	16	(0)
2014	Nea Salamis	12	(0)
2016	Oissel	5	(0)
2017–2019	Cannes	21	(0)
Total		260	(0)
- * Club domestic league appearances and goals

Kenny Lego Gillet (born 3 January 1986) is a French former professional footballer who played as a left-back. He previously played for SM Caen, Barnet, Inverness Caledonian Thistle, AEK Larnaca, Nea Salamis Famagusta and Oissel.

== Career ==
He was released in the summer of 2007 and after a successful trial with Barnet he signed for the club on 24 August. On 2 June 2010, it was announced on the club website that Gillet had been released by Barnet. Later in the month he rejected a contract offer from new manager Mark Stimson.

In July 2010, Gillet went on trial with Leyton Orient, and later in the month joined Inverness Caledonian Thistle. Kenny was part of the Inverness team that beat Celtic 3-2 on 4 May 2011. Gillet signed for Cypriot club AEK Larnaca in July 2012.

== Career statistics ==
Club	Season	Division	League		National Cup		League Cup		Other		Total	
Club	Season	Division	Apps	Goals	Apps	Goals	Apps	Goals	Apps	Goals	Apps	Goals
Caen B	2005–06	CFA 2	35	0	0	0	0	0	0	0	35	0
Caen B	2006–07	CFA 2	35	0	0	0	0	0	0	0	35	0
Total			70	0	0	0	0	0	0		70	0
Barnet	2007–08	League Two	31	0	6	0	0	0	0	0	37	0
Barnet	2008–09	League Two	32	0	2	0	1	0	1 (Note: Appearance(s) in Football League Trophy)	0	36	0
Barnet	2009–10	League Two	37	0	3	0	1	0	1	0	42	0
Total			100	0	11	0	2	0	2		115	0
Inverness Caledonian Thistle	2010–11	SPL	13	0	0	0	1	0	0	0	14	0
Inverness Caledonian Thistle	2011–12	SPL	25	0	2	0	0	0	0	0	27	0
Total			36	0	2	0	1	0	0		39	0
AEK Larnaca	2012–13	Cypriot First Division	16	0	2	0	0	0	0	0	18	0
AEK Larnaca	2013–14	Cypriot First Division	0	0	0	0	0	0	0	0	0	0
Nea Salamis	2013–14	Cypriot First Division	12	0	1	0	0	0	0	0	13	0
Oissel	2015–16	CFA 2	5	0	0	0	0	0	0	0	5	0
Cannes	2017–18	CFA 2	8	0	0	0	0	0	0	0	8	0
Cannes	2018–19	CFA 2	13	0	0	0	0	0	0	0	13	0
Career total			260	0	16	0	3	0	2	0	281	0
