= Mark Hughes (footballer, born 1983) =

Northern Irish footballer (born 1983)

Personal information
- Full name: Mark Anthony Hughes
- Date of birth: 16 September 1983 (age 43)
- Place of birth: Dungannon, Northern Ireland
- Height: 5 ft 10 in (1.78 m)
- Position: Midfielder

Youth career
- –2001: Tottenham Hotspur

Senior career*
Years	Team	Apps	(Gls)
2001–2005	Tottenham Hotspur	0	(0)
2004	→ Northampton Town (loan)	3	(0)
2004–2005	→ Oldham Athletic (loan)	27	(0)
2005–2006	Oldham Athletic	33	(1)
2006–2007	Thurrock	10	(0)
2006–2007	→ Chesterfield (loan)	2	(1)
2007	Stevenage Borough	10	(2)
2007–2009	Chester City	69	(4)
2009–2012	Barnet	129	(7)
2012–2013	Eastleigh	31	(3)
2013–2016	Chelmsford City	98	(9)
2016–2017	Eastbourne Borough	38	(11)
2017–2018	Bishop's Stortford		
2018–2020	Cheshunt	55	(13)

International career
2002–2005	Northern Ireland U21	12	(0)
2006	Northern Ireland	2	(0)

Managerial career
- 2020: Cheshunt (assistant)
- 2021: Billericay Town (assistant)
- 2022–2023: King's Lynn Town (assistant)
- 2023: King's Lynn Town
- * Club domestic league appearances and goals

Mark Anthony Hughes (born 16 September 1983) is a former professional footballer who played as a midfielder. He was most recently manager of King's Lynn Town.

== Club career ==
Hughes was born in Dungannon, Northern Ireland. He started his career at Tottenham Hotspur, coming through their youth system and breaking into the reserve side. Midway through the 2003–04 season he was loaned out to Oldham Athletic where he impressed sufficiently to be signed permanently for a nominal fee. He played a little over one season at Oldham before new boss John Sheridan decided he was surplus to requirements and terminated his contract. At Oldham he scored his first career goal in a 4–3 win over Bristol City.

From Oldham Athletic he moved into non-League with Thurrock, but was back in the league a few months later, joining League One side Chesterfield agreed to take him on loan. At Chesterfield he scored on his debut against Gillingham. Three months later, he was on the move again, joining Conference National club Stevenage Borough. Hughes struggled to establish himself in a disappointing league campaign for Stevenage and was once again released, with another former Spurs youngster, Stuart Lewis signing for the club.

Hughes joined Chester City after impressing on trial in July and August 2007. He made his debut for the club on the opening day of 2007–08 against his former club Chesterfield and was a regular starter for City for the next 18 months before moving to Barnet in February 2009.

Hughes scored the goal that kept Barnet in the Football League on the last day of the 2011–12 League Two season, in the 2–1 win at Burton Albion. As a result, Hereford United were relegated to the Football Conference instead.

In August 2012, Hughes signed for Conference South side Eastleigh, making his debut on 29 September 2012.

In July 2013, Hughes signed for Conference South club Chelmsford City and was immediately made club captain. Hughes made his 100th appearance in all competitions for Chelmsford City on 7 November 2015 in a loss to Truro City, after which he expressed his desire to see out his career at the club. However, on 29 June 2016, new manager Rod Stringer confirmed Hughes' departure.

In July 2016, Hughes joined Eastbourne Borough.

== Coaching career ==
On 23 May 2017, Hughes signed for Bishop's Stortford in a player-assistant manager role. He joined Cheshunt for the 2018–19 season, where he continued playing alongside roles as first team coach and later assistant manager.

Hughes joined Billericay Town as assistant to new manager Kevin Watson in January 2021.

He joined King's Lynn Town as first team coach in January 2022 following the appointment of Tommy Widdrington as manager. After his resignation in April 2023, Hughes was appointed interim manager. On 12 May 2023, he was given the job on a permanent basis, signing a two-year deal. A poor start to the 2023–24 season where his side picked up just eight points from ten matches spelled the end of his managerial tenure, departing the club on 25 September 2023.

== International career ==
Hughes was picked for the Northern Ireland squad, which toured America in 2006, making two full caps against Romania and Uruguay.
