= Lee Harrison =

English footballer (born 1971)

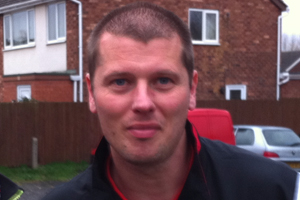
- Harrison in 2011

Personal information
- Full name: Lee David Harrison
- Date of birth: 12 September 1971 (age 55)
- Place of birth: Billericay, England
- Height: 1.88 m (6 ft 2 in)
- Position: Goalkeeper

Youth career
- Charlton Athletic

Senior career*
Years	Team	Apps	(Gls)
1990–1992	Charlton Athletic	0	(0)
1991–1992	→ Fulham (loan)	12	(0)
1992	→ Gillingham (loan)	2	(0)
1992–1996	Fulham	12	(0)
1996–2003	Barnet	234	(0)
2002–2003	→ Peterborough United (loan)	12	(0)
2003–2005	Leyton Orient	61	(0)
2005–2006	Peterborough United	6	(0)
2006–2010	Barnet	87	(0)
2010–2011	Hayes & Yeading United	26	(0)
2011	Newport County	0	(0)
2012–2014	Wycombe Wanderers	0	(0)
Total		452	(0)

Managerial career
- 2011: Newport County (caretaker)
- * Club domestic league appearances and goals

Lee David Harrison (born 12 September 1971) is an English goalkeeping coach, currently working as a First Team Coach at Luton Town F.C Harrison spent most of his career with Barnet, but he has played in over 400 League and Cup games in the course of his career with Gillingham, Fulham, Leyton Orient and Peterborough United.

== Playing career ==
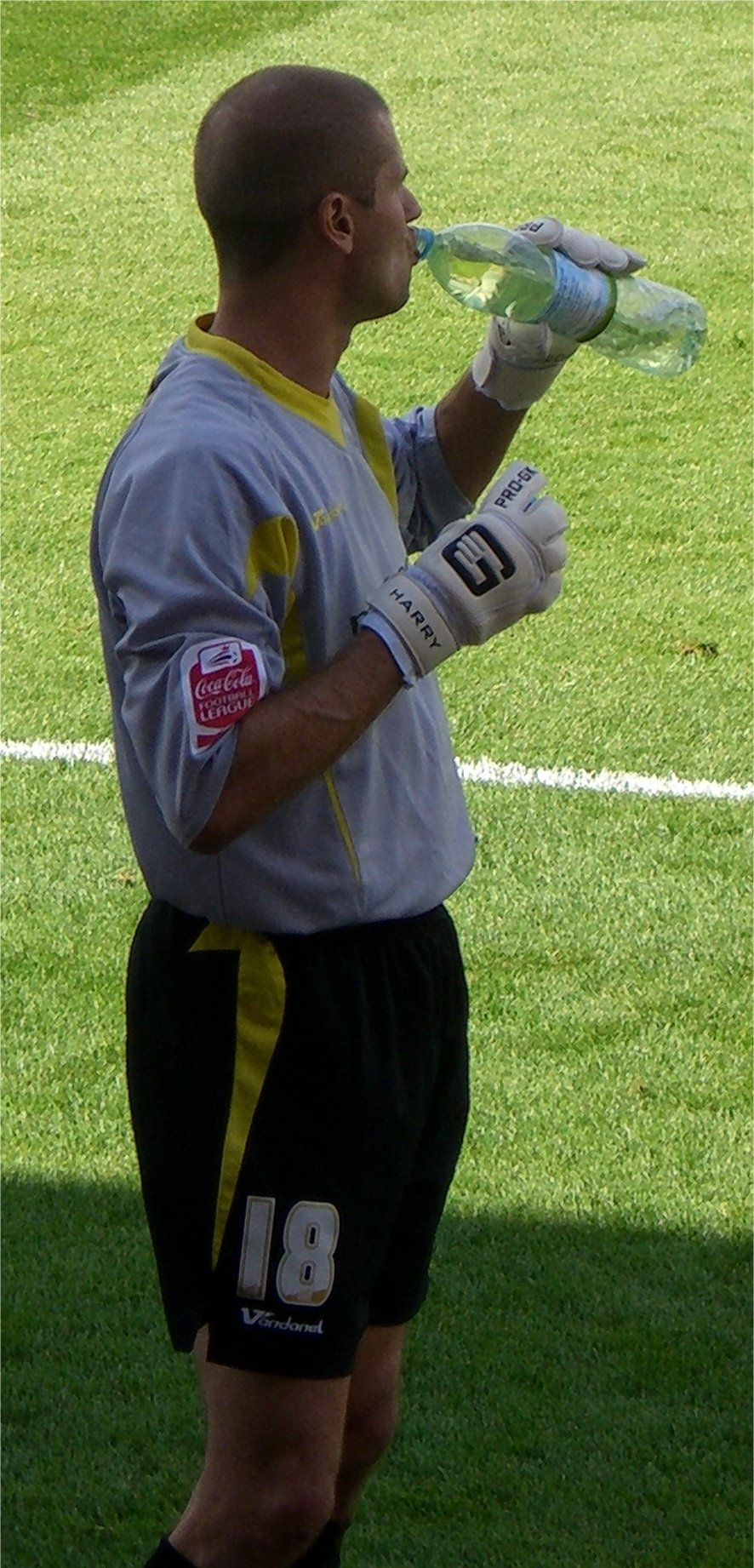
Harrison with Barnet in 2008

Born in Billericay, Essex, Harrison, a goalkeeper, started his career at Charlton Athletic without making any first team appearances. From 1996 until 2003 he played 233 Football League games for Barnet and was Player of the Year for three consecutive seasons. After a £10,000 transfer to Leyton Orient where he played 65 League and Cup games – he moved to Peterborough United for the 2005–06 season, but in July 2006 returned to Barnet as player-coach. He was appointed club captain in July 2007.

In his second spell at the club, he attained the feat of making 300 league appearances for the club, honoured with a banner adorned on the North Terrace fence for the match against Rochdale in which he kept a clean sheet in a 0–0 draw. He was only the fifth player in the last 30 years to achieve this feat for Barnet.

Harrison was released at the end of the 2009–10 season and briefly joined Dagenham & Redbridge as a coach for their successful play-off campaign. Harrison signed a playing contract with Hayes & Yeading on 2 August 2010.

== Coaching career ==
In May 2011, Harrison joined Newport County as assistant manager to Anthony Hudson and backup goalkeeper. Following the sacking of Hudson in September 2011 Harrison was appointed caretaker manager for one match, a 2–0 defeat at Darlington. Justin Edinburgh was appointed team manager on 4 October 2011 and Jimmy Dack appointed assistant manager, therefore Harrison was released from his contract.

On 2 August 2012, it was announced that Harrison had been appointed permanent goalkeeping coach at Wycombe Wanderers, after a period working at the club on a temporary basis. Harrison was also listed as a player at Wycombe, taking shirt number 21. Harrison left Wycombe in January 2014 to take up a coaching role at Premier League West Ham United as academy goalkeeper coach. He was replaced at Wycombe by Barry Richardson.

On 3 July 2015, Harrison returned to Leyton Orient as first team goalkeeper coach under the management of Ian Hendon. In January 2021, he returned to Wycombe Wanderers as their goalkeeping coach.

On 7 October 2022, it was announced that Lee Harrison would join Colchester United as First Team Goalkeeping coach, becoming new head coach Matt Bloomfield's first addition to his backroom staff.

On 22 February 2023 Lee Harrison returned to Wycombe Wanderers for the third time as goalkeeping coach following Matt Bloomfield from Colchester United.
