= Joe Tabiri =

Ghanaian-born English footballer

Joseph Owusu Tabiri
Personal information
- Full name: Joseph Owusu Tabiri
- Date of birth: 16 October 1988 (age 38)
- Place of birth: Ghana
- Height: 5 ft 11 in (1.80 m)
- Position: Midfielder

Team information
- Current team: Linero IF

Youth career
- 2003–2006: Protec Football Development School
- 2006–2007: Barnet

Senior career*
Years	Team	Apps	(Gls)
2007–2010	Barnet	12	(0)
2007	→ Welwyn Garden City (loan)		
2008	→ Staines Town (loan)	2	(0)
2008	→ Farnborough (loan)	3	(0)
2008	→ Wingate & Finchley (loan)	5	(0)
2008–2009	→ Lewes (loan)	9	(1)
2009	→ Grays Athletic (loan)	3	(0)
2009	→ Havant & Waterlooville (loan)	1	(0)
2010	→ Havant & Waterlooville (loan)	8	(0)
2010	→ Dover Athletic (loan)	11	(1)
2010–2011	Dover Athletic	18	(1)
2011	→ Lewes (loan)	7	(1)
2012	AFC Hornchurch	1	(0)
2012–2013	Maidenhead United	17	(0)
2013–2014	Cheshunt	5	(0)
2014	Aveley	4	(0)
2014–2015	Bishop's Storford	37	(1)
2015	Cambridge City	0	(0)
2016	Torn	16	(0)
2017–2018	Veberöds	39	(16)
2019	Lunds SK	11	(6)
2020–	Linero IF	50	(11)
- * Club domestic league appearances and goals as of 07:28, 18 October 2023 (UTC)

Joseph Owusu Tabiri (born 16 October 1988) is a Ghana-born English footballer who plays as a midfielder for Linero IF.

== Career ==
Tabiri joined Farnborough on dual registration in January 2008, having previously played for Staines Town and Wingate & Finchley.

He made his Barnet debut in the League Cup against Brighton & Hove Albion on 13 August 2008. In October 2008 he joined Lewes on loan, and was sent off on his debut.

Tabiri signed for Grays Athletic on a one-month loan deal in January 2009, before joining Havant & Waterlooville in November for a month, and again for a month in February. He joined Dover Athletic on loan in March. Tabiri was released by Barnet at the end of the 2009/10 season, before joining Dover Athletic on a one-year deal.

In November 2012, he joined Conference South side AFC Hornchurch on a free transfer. During the 2013-14 season, he played for Cheshunt, making five league appearances.
