= Paul Fairclough =

English footballer (born 1950)

Personal information
- Date of birth: 31 January 1950 (age 76)
- Place of birth: Litherland, Lancashire, England
- Position: Midfielder

Team information
- Current team: England C (manager)

Youth career
- Liverpool

Senior career*
Years	Team	Apps	(Gls)
- Liverpool
- Wigan Athletic
- Witton Albion
1975–77 & 1981–84	Wealdstone	104	(9)
- St Albans City
1981–82	Cheshunt	5	(0)

Managerial career
- 1988–1990: Hertford Town
- 1990–1998: Stevenage Borough
- 2000–2002: Stevenage Borough
- 2003–: England C
- 2004–2008: Barnet
- 2010: Barnet (caretaker)
- 2011: Barnet (caretaker)
- 2014: Barnet (caretaker)
- 2021: Barnet (caretaker)
- * Club domestic league appearances and goals

Paul Fairclough (born 31 January 1950) is an English football manager and former player who is the manager of the England C team.

As a player, he made five appearances for Cheshunt in the 1981–82 season.

== Managerial career ==
=== Stevenage ===
In 1990 Stevenage Borough employed Paul Fairclough as manager, who had previously managed Hertfordshire neighbours Hertford Town.

After two fourth-placed finishes, under the management of Fairclough, Stevenage won The Isthmian League Division Two North in 1990–91, winning 34 of their 42 games, including every match played at home, scoring 122 goals and amassing 107 points.

The following season Fairclough led the club to the Division One championship, remaining unbeaten at home again, and were promoted to the Premier Division. The club's long unbeaten home record was finally ended by Dulwich Hamlet, with the streak lasting 44 matches, of which 42 were won.

In 1993–94, still under Paul Fairclough's reins, the club won the Premier Division, and were promoted to the Football Conference. Two seasons later Fairclough led Stevenage to win the Conference, but they were denied promotion to the Football League due to insufficient ground facilities.

In 1998 Fairclough guided Stevenage into the FA Cup fourth round. They were awarded a home tie against Newcastle United, which they drew 1–1 against all odds, and subsequently were awarded a replay at St James' Park. Stevenage lost 2–1 in a controversial game, as Alan Shearer's header, awarded a goal by the referee, may or may not have crossed the line.

=== Barnet ===
Fairclough was appointed caretaker manager of Barnet for the final few months of the 2003–04 Conference National season, replacing Martin Allen who had controversially left the North Londoners for Brentford in March 2004. Initially there was some scepticism surrounding Fairclough's appointment due to his history with rivals Stevenage Borough.

Fairclough guided Barnet to 4th place in the campaign to set up a play-off semi-final with Shrewsbury Town. Barnet won the first leg at Underhill 2–1 following a dramatic injury-time header from Bees defender Simon Clist. The second leg was a cagey affair and the tie was eventually settled on penalties – Barnet losing 5–3 in the shootout. Although the team had failed to reach the play-off final, Fairclough was handed the job on a permanent basis shortly after by Barnet chairman Tony Kleanthous.

In his first full season as Barnet manager Fairclough was determined to make up for the previous season's disappointment. Following an excellent start to the campaign, the Bees propelled themselves to the top of the division, a position they occupied for the majority of the season. Fairclough's side produced some excellent performances both at Underhill and on the road, including the 3–1 victory over promotion rivals Carlisle United in mid-October, watched by a then-record Conference crowd of 9,215. With a solid defence marshalled by captain Ian Hendon, and 29 goals from striker Giuliano Grazioli, Barnet won the Conference title, securing automatic promotion to the Football League and finishing 12 points clear of their closest challengers with a vastly superior goal difference.

In his maiden venture into League management Fairclough successfully fought off relegation back to the Conference, ensuring Barnet's Football League status with victory over Rushden & Diamonds on the final day of the season. The highlight of the campaign undoubtedly came in late October when Fairclough's men travelled north to take on Manchester United in the third round of the League Cup.

During the 2006–07 campaign, Fairclough led Barnet to the Fourth Round of the FA Cup – the first time in the club's history. Indeed, the team's league position improved significantly on the previous season, finishing well clear of the relegation zone in 14th place. Despite this, Fairclough expressed his disappointment with the season overall, bemoaning his side's failure to draw a "big fish" in the FA Cup which could have seen a sizeable cash injection into the club. Fairclough was also critical of his team's performances on the pitch, in particular some of his side's defensive displays. As a result, he signalled his intentions for a squad shake-up in the close season, releasing a number of first team players just days after their final league match.

By the time Christmas arrived in the 2008–09 season, Barnet had only won three league matches, and would have been in dire relegation trouble had it not been for the deduction of points at the beginning of the season from Luton Town, Rotherham United and AFC Bournemouth. After losing at home to Aldershot Town on Boxing Day, Fairclough decided it was time to step down after the game at Bournemouth on 28 December. The players gained an important 2–0 win to finish Fairclough's reign on a high.

In April 2010 Fairclough was made caretaker manager at Barnet after the sacking of Ian Hendon, guiding the Bees to safety with a 1–0 win over Rochdale on the last day of the season. He was made Temporary Manager till the end of the season in early 2011 following the sacking of Mark Stimson however stepped down with 8 games to go and was replaced by Martin Allen. He began his fourth managerial spell at Barnet in January 2014 following the departure of Edgar Davids. After a 1–3 loss at home to Aldershot Town he resigned and was replaced by Ulrich Landvreugd and Dick Schreuder.

Fairclough became caretaker manager once more on 11 March 2021, leading the team following the departure of Tim Flowers. He left this role eleven days later after taking charge for three games.

== Honours ==
Hertford Town

- Herts Senior Cup: 1989–90

Stevenage Borough

- Conference National: 1995–96
- Isthmian Premier Division: 1993–94
- Isthmian Division One: 1991–92
- Isthmian Division Two North: 1990–91

Barnet

- Conference National: 2004–05
- Herts Senior Cup: 2006–07
- Hertfordshire Senior Cup: 2006–07

England C

- European Challenge Trophy: 2005–06
- Four Nations Tournament: 2003, 2005, 2007, 2008

Individual

- League Two Manager of the Month: September 2007
