= List of Dagenham & Redbridge F.C. players =

This is a list of notable footballers who have played for Dagenham & Redbridge F.C. Generally, this means players that have played a significant number of first-class matches for the club. Other players who have played an important role for the club can be included, but the reason why they have been included should be added in the 'Notes' column.

For a list of all Dag & Red players, major or minor, with a Wikipedia article, see Category:Dagenham & Redbridge players, and for the current squad see the main Dag & Red article.

Players are listed according to the date of their first team debut. Appearances and goals are for first-team competitive matches only; wartime matches are excluded. Substitute appearances included.

== Key ==
- The following list contains only players who played in the Football League whilst a registered player of Dagenham & Redbridge. Appearances gained prior to joining and subsequent to leaving the club and non-league games are not included.
- Table headings: Apps = Total number of league appearances for Dagenham & Redbridge; Goals = Total number of league goals for Dagenham & Redbridge; Years = Dates spent registered as a Dagenham & Redbridge player whilst in the Football League; Ref = source of information
- Playing positions: GK = Goalkeeper; DF = Defender; MF = Midfielder; FW = Forward
- * Players with this colour and symbol in the "Name" column are currently signed to Dagenham & Redbridge.
- ‡ Players with this colour and symbol in the "Nation" column are capped at full international level.
- † Players with name in italics and marked † were on loan were on loan from another club for the duration of their Dagenham & Redrbidge career.
- ‡ Players marked in **bold** with the ‡ symbol have won the Dagenham & Redbridge Player of the Year award.

== List of players ==
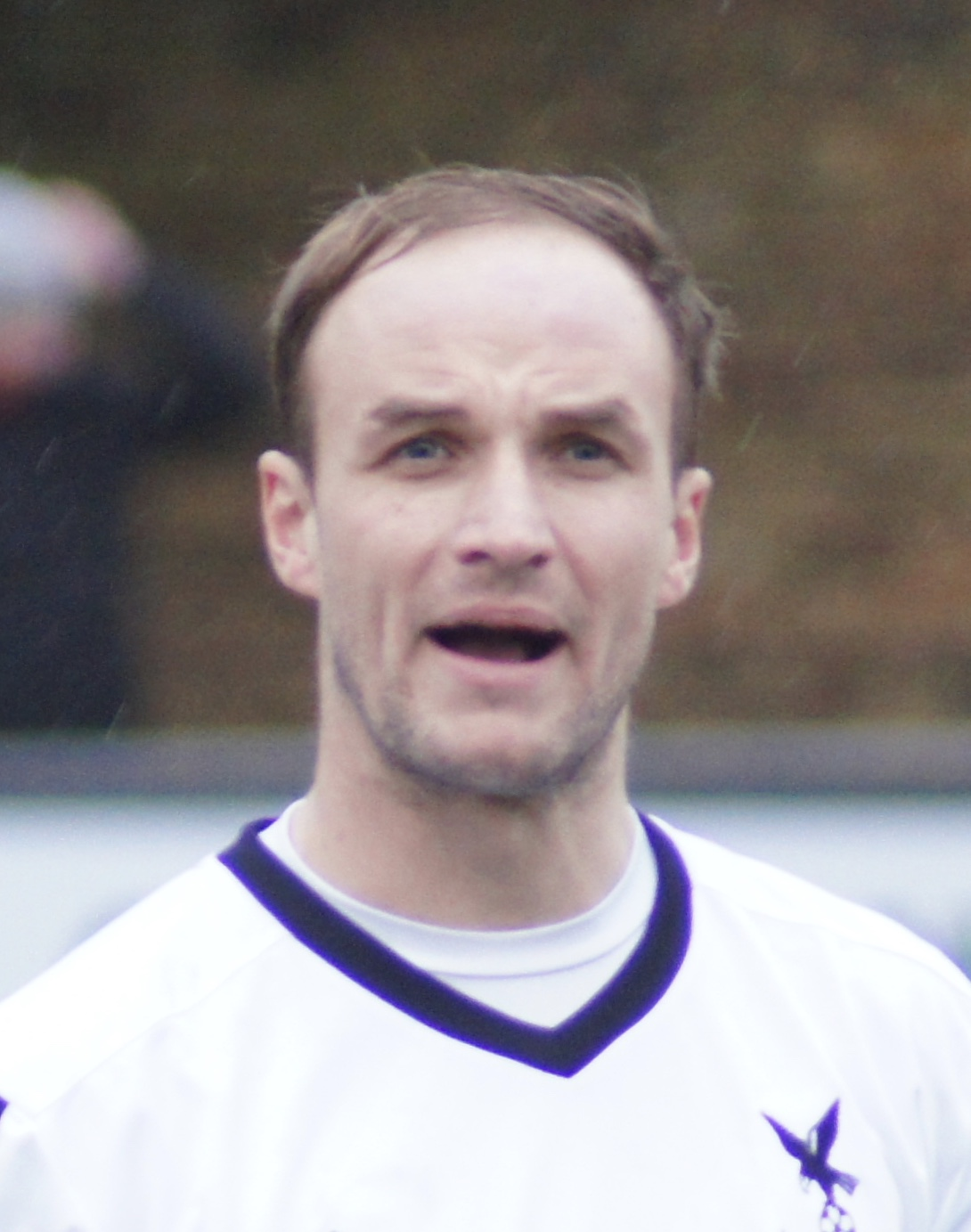
Scott Doe holds the record for the most Football League appearances for the club with 243.

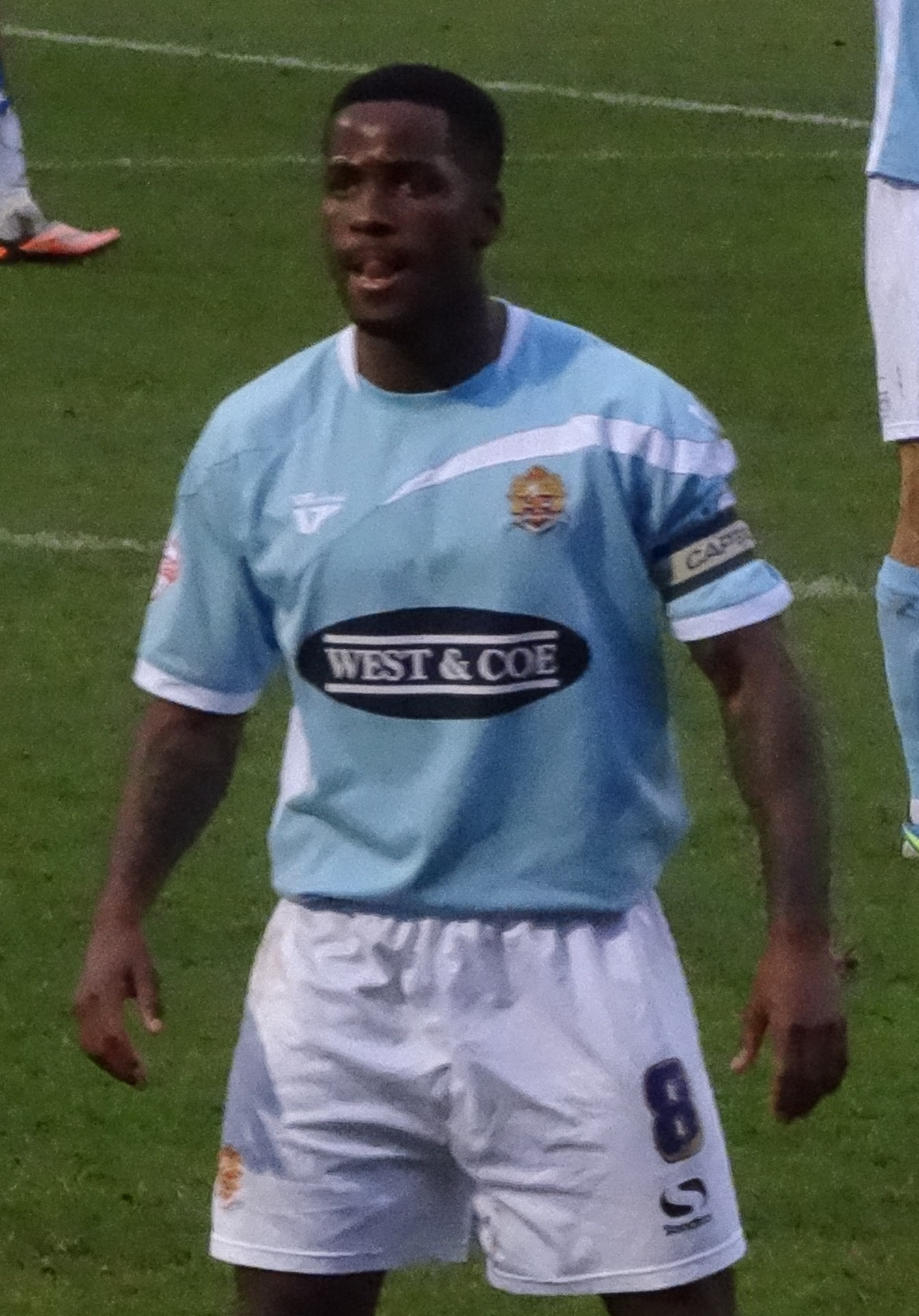
Abu Ogogo spent six seasons with the club and made 225 appearances.

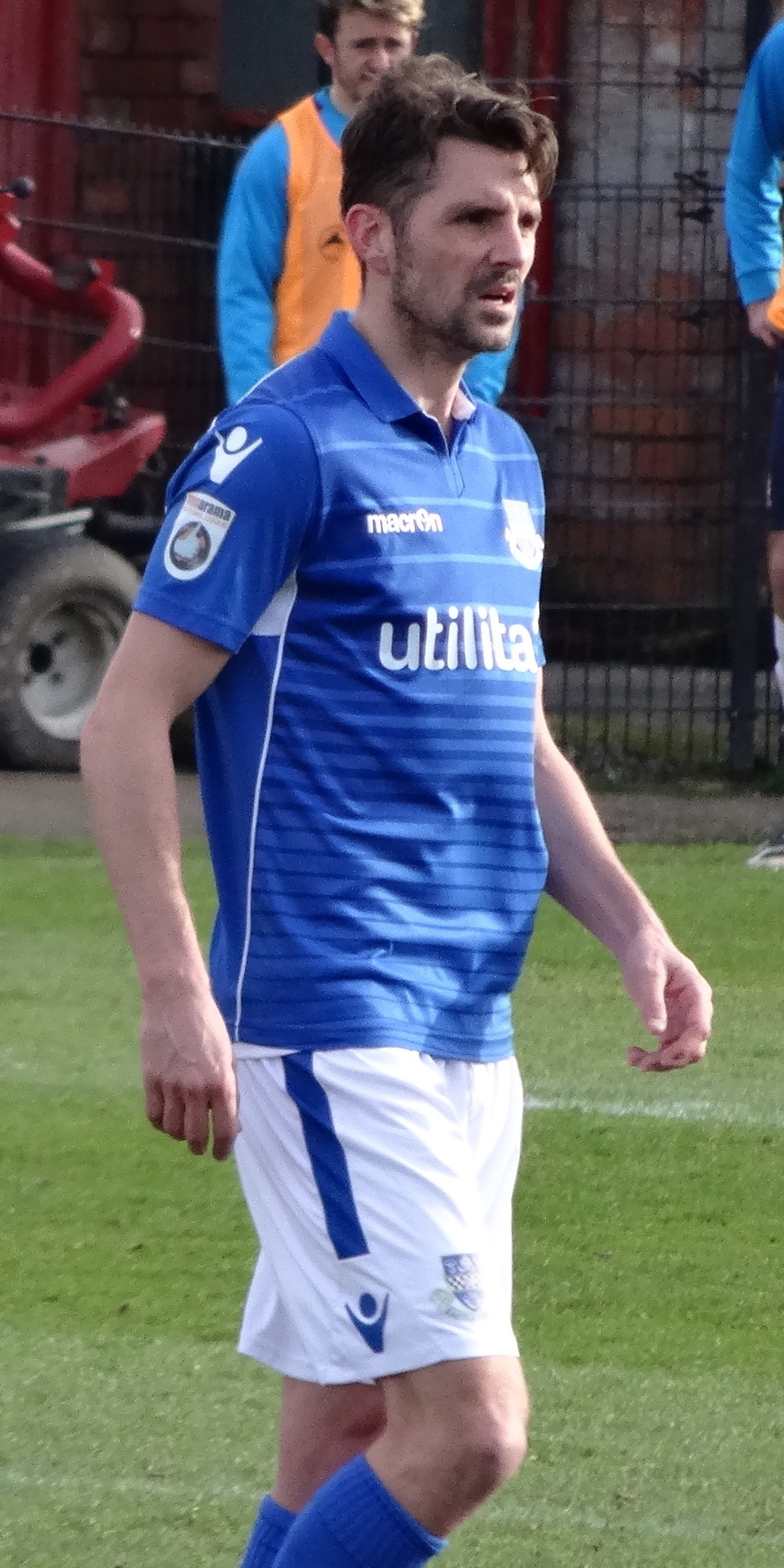
Ben Strevens is the second highest goalscorer for the club in the Football League with 30 goals across two spells.

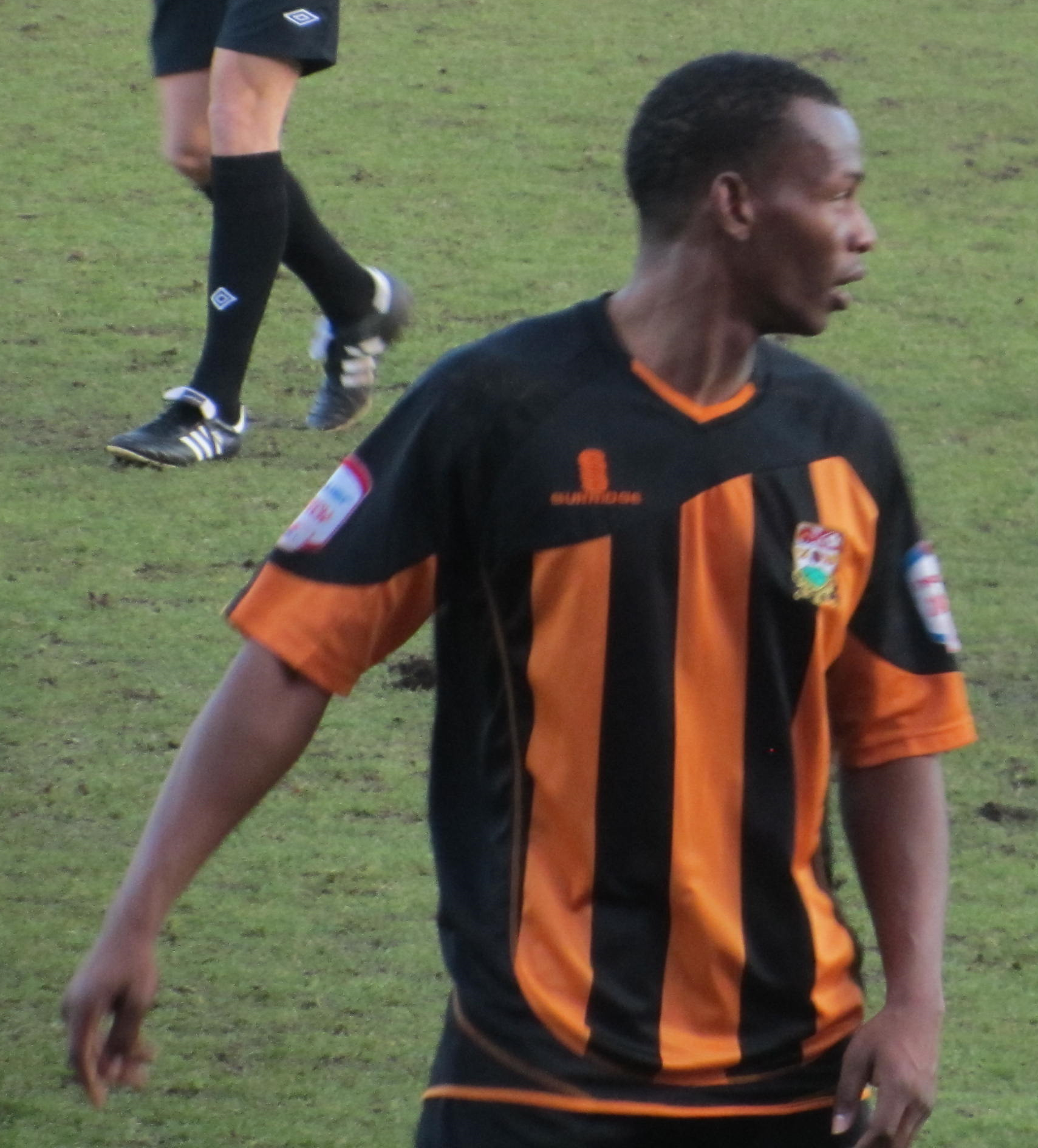
Jon Nurse was the club's first fully capped international when he played for Barbados in 2008

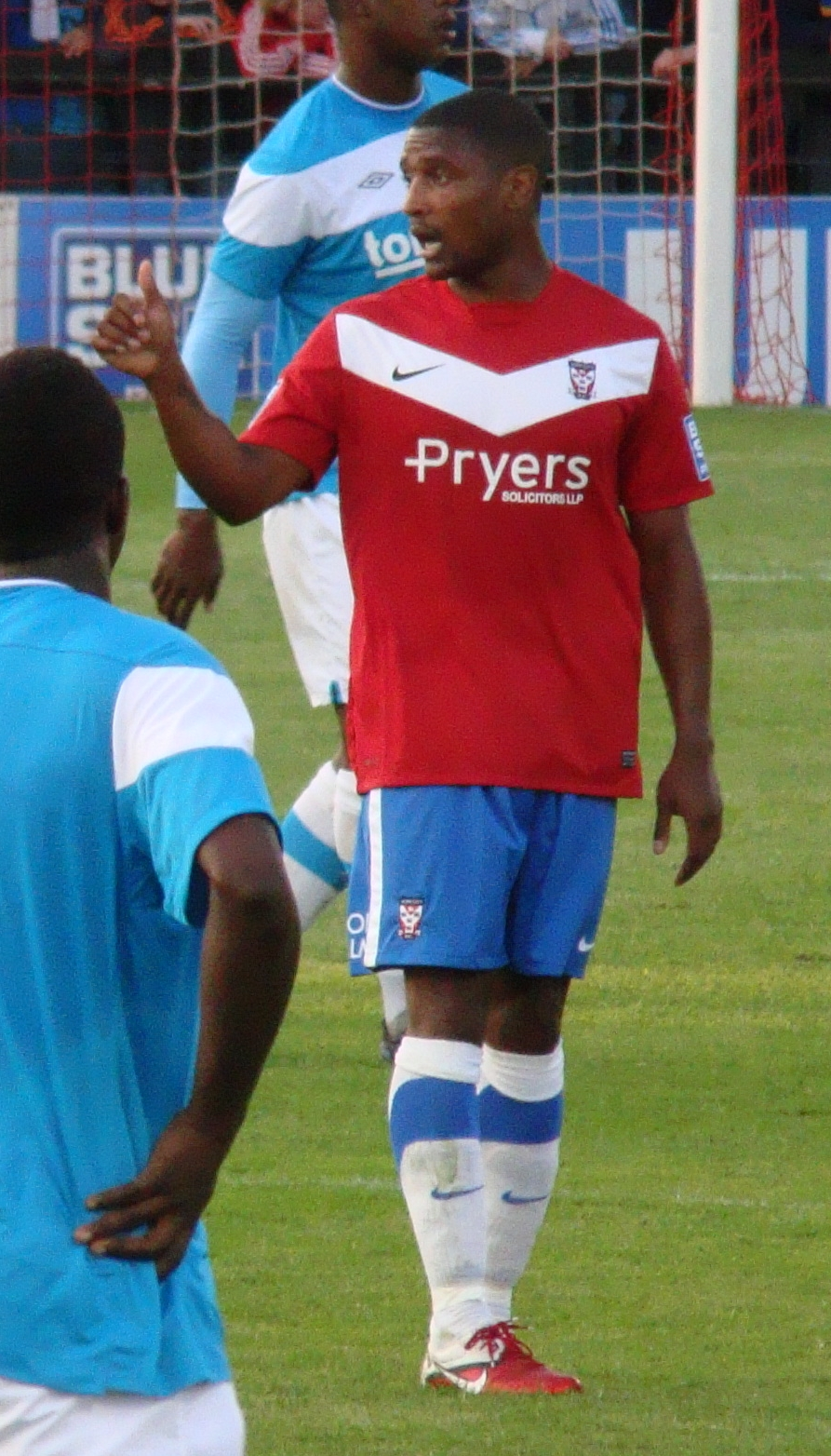
Andre Boucaud is one of only two players who remain at the club since they were relegated from the Football League.

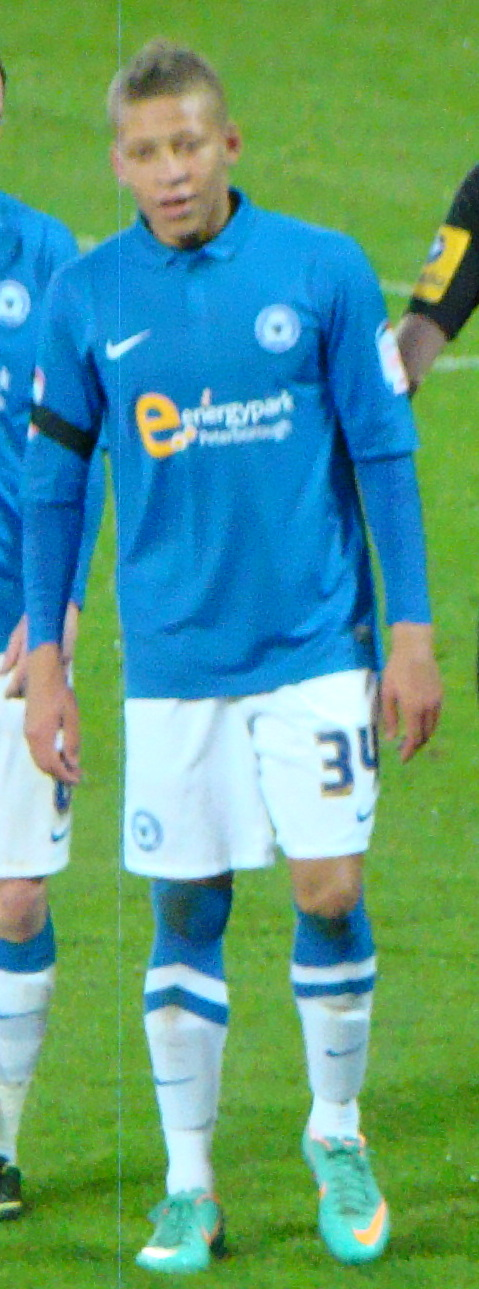
Dwight Gayle became the club's record sale when he transferred to Peterborough United in 2013.

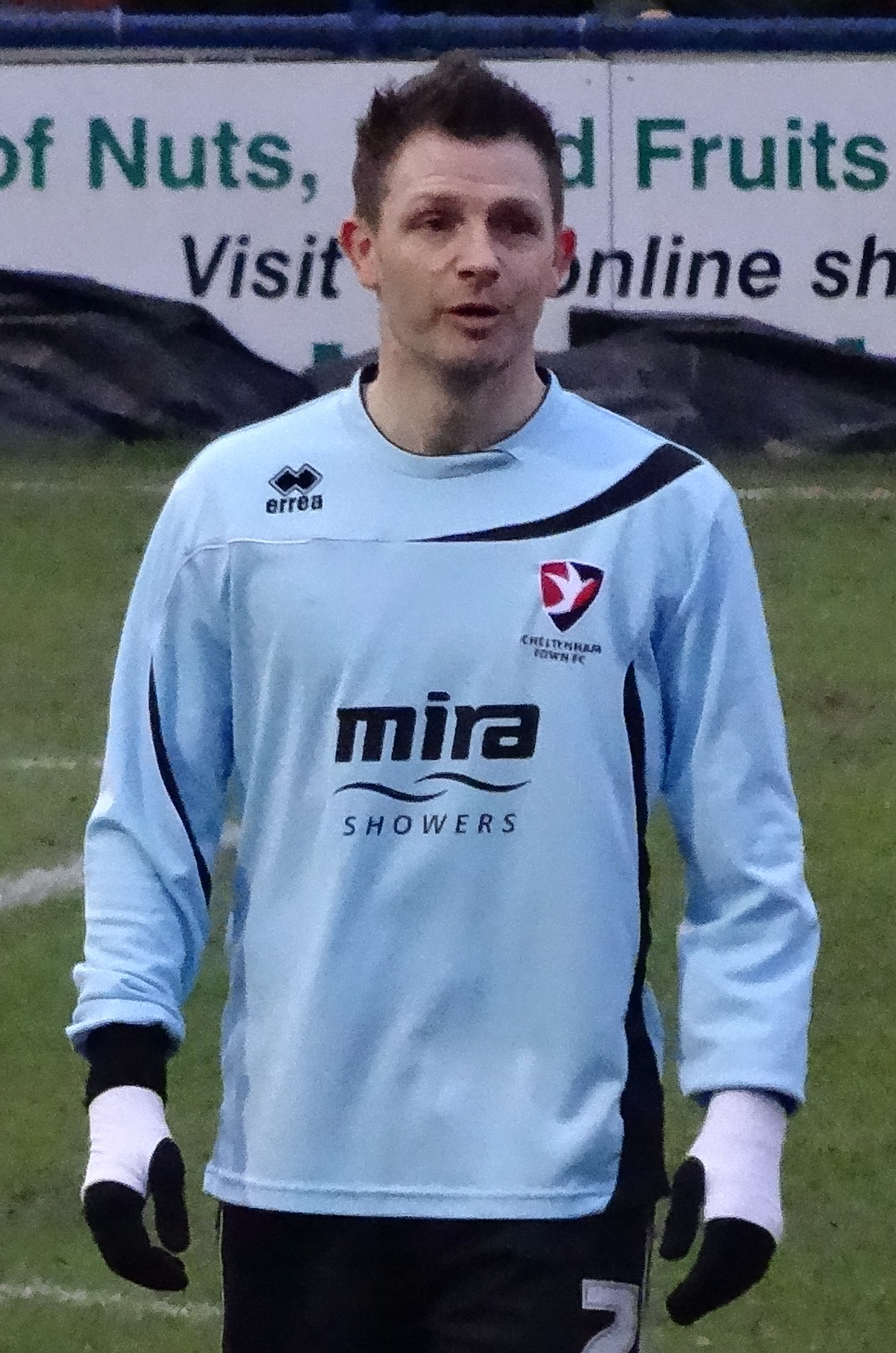
Jamie Cureton won the Player of the Year award in the 2014–15 season.

As of 6 June 2018

List of Dagenham & Redbridge F.C. players making appearances in the Football League
Name	Nation	Position	Years	Apps	Goals	Refs
Ahmed Abdulla	Saudi Arabia	MF	2012	5	0	
Patrick Agyemang †	Ghana ‡	FW	2014–2015	4	0	
John Akinde †	England	FW	2011; 2012	14	2	
Will Antwi	Ghana ‡	DF	2009–2011	30	2	
Mark Arber ‡	England	DF	2008–2012	176	12	
Ade Azeez †	England	FW	2014	15	3	
Shabazz Baidoo	England	MF	2008	3	0	
Damian Batt	England	DF	2014–2015	28	0	
Mathieu Baudry †	France	DF	2012	11	0	
Paul Benson	England	FW	2007–2010	103	40	
Billy Bingham	England	MF	2009–2015	117	8	
Mason Bloomfield	England	FW	2014–2015	1	0	
Jon Boardman	England	DF	2007–2009	27	0	
Jonathan Bond †	England	GK	2012	5	0	
Andre Boucaud *	Trinidad and Tobago ‡	MF	2014–2016	66	0	
Kayleden Brown †	Wales	MF	2010–2011	3	0	
David Button †	England	GK	2009	3	0	
Jake Caprice †	England	DF	2012–2013	8	0	
João Carlos	Portugal	MF	2009–2010	1	0	
Daniel Carr †	Trinidad and Tobago	FW	2015	6	0	
Matty Cash †	England	MF	2016	12	3	
Ashley Chambers	England	MF	2014–2016	69	6	
Daniel Charge	England	MF	2008–2009	1	0	
Jack Connors	Republic of Ireland	DF	2013–2016	49	0	
Anthony Cook	England	DF	2007–2009	1	0	
Mark Cousins ‡	England	GK	2014–2016	60	0	
Adam Cunnington	England	FW	2011–2012	9	0	
Jamie Cureton ‡	England	FW	2014–2016	83	26	
Darren Currie	England	MF	2009–2011	38	1	
Lawson D'Ath †	England	MF	2013–2014	21	1	
Jamie Day †	England	DF	2009–2010	8	0	
Harlee Dean	England	MF	2008–2010	1	0	
Louis Dennis	England	FW	2011–2014	8	0	
Chris Dickson	Ghana ‡	FW	2013–2014	25	1	
Clévid Dikamona	Congo ‡	DF	2015–2016	27	2	
Scott Doe	England	DF	2009–2015	243	11	
Christian Doidge	Wales	FW	2014–2016	46	10	
James Dunne †	England	MF	2015–2016	9	0	
Anthony Edgar	England	MF	2013–2014	7	0	
Robert Edmans	England	FW	2011–2013	4	0	
Medy Elito	England	MF	2010–2011; 2011–2014	125	19	
Shamir Fenelon †	Republic of Ireland	FW	2015	4	0	
Kane Ferdinand	Republic of Ireland	MF	2015–2016	15	1	
Yoann Folly †	Togo ‡	MF	2010	7	0	
Jonathan Fortune	England	DF	2013	1	0	
Danny Foster	England	DF	2007–2009	70	3	
Peter Gain	Republic of Ireland	MF	2008–2012	149	4	
Dwight Gayle	England	MF	2011–2013	18	7	
Ian Gayle	England	DF	2011–2016	10	0	
Exodus Geohaghon †	England	DF	2011–2012	2	0	
Bradley Goldberg	England	FW	2013–2015	5	0	
Lee Goodwin	England	DF	2007–2008	1	0	
Gianluca Gracco	Italy	FW	2012–2013	1	0	
Richard Graham	Northern Ireland	MF	2007–2009	12	0	
Danny Green	England	MF	2009–2011	87	24	
Danny Green	England	MF	2010–2012	17	1	
Dominic Green	England	MF	2007–2008; 2011–2013	40	2	
Nathan Green	England	DF	2014–2015	7	0	
Scott Griffiths	England	DF	2007–2010	98	1	
Luke Guttridge	England	MF	2016	3	1	
Jamie Guy †	England	FW	2009	9	1	
Gareth Gwillim	England	MF	2010–2011	2	0	
Ryan Hall †	England	MF	2008	8	2	
Niko Hämäläinen †	Finland	MF	2015	1	0	
Oliver Hawkins	England	FW	2015–2016	18	1	
Ashley Hemmings	England	MF	2014–2016	80	9	
Troy Hewitt †	England	FW	2011	6	0	
Zavon Hines	England	MF	2013–2016	33	6	
Dave Hogan	England	GK	2008–2013	2	0	
Luke Howell	England	MF	2011–2015	127	18	
Gavin Hoyte	Trinidad and Tobago ‡	DF	2012–2014	68	0	
Justin Hoyte	Trinidad and Tobago ‡	DF	2015–2016	25	0	
Shane Huke	Australia	MF	2007–2009	37	2	
Dominic Hyam †	Scotland	DF	2016	16	0	
Phil Ifil	England	DF	2010–2011	14	0	
Femi Ilesanmi	England	DF	2010–2014	117	1	
Alex Jakubiak †	Scotland	FW	2014–2015	23	4	
Jodi Jones	England	FW	2015–2016	35	4	
Joss Labadie ‡	England	MF	2014–2016	52	6	
Cameron Lancaster †	England	FW	2011	4	0	
Olly Lee †	England	MF	2011	21	3	
Chris Lewington	England	GK	2009–2014	127	0	
Stuart Lewis	England	MF	2010–2011	10	0	
Matt Lockwood †	England	DF	2009	4	0	
Doug Loft †	England	MF	2009	11	0	
Kevin Maher	Republic of Ireland	MF	2011–2013	16	0	
Matt McClure	Northern Ireland	FW	2015–2016	20	4	
Damien McCrory	Republic of Ireland	DF	2010–2012	76	1	
Jonathan Miles †	England	GK	2013	2	0	
Adam Miller †	England	MF	2009–2010	8	0	
Cristian Montaño †	Colombia	FW	2011–2012	10	3	
Graeme Montgomery	England	MF	2009–2011	22	2	
Chris Moore	Wales	FW	2007–2008	26	2	
Marvin Morgan †	England	FW	2011	12	0	
Ollie Muldoon †	England	MF	2016	18	0	
Jake Mulraney †	Republic of Ireland	MF	2015	6	0	
Rhys Murphy	Republic of Ireland	FW	2013–2015	41	14	
Luke Norris †	England	FW	2014	19	4	
Nyron Nosworthy	Jamaica ‡	DF	2015–2016	17	1	
Jon Nouble	England	FW	2013–2015	1	0	
Jon Nurse	Barbados ‡	FW	2007–2012	179	27	
Mark Nwokeji	England	FW	2008–2010	16	3	
Liam O'Brien	England	GK	2014–2016	34	0	
Afolabi Obafemi	England	MF	2013–2014	22	2	
Ayo Obileye †	England	DF	2014–2015; 2015–2016	42	2	
Abu Ogogo ‡	England	MF	2009–2015	225	17	
Magnus Okuonghae	England	DF	2007–2009	55	2	
Marlon Pack †	England	MF	2010	17	1	
Aiden Palmer †	England	DF	2009	3	0	
Victor Pálsson †	Iceland ‡	MF	2010–2011	2	0	
Josh Parker †	Antigua and Barbuda ‡	MF	2012	8	0	
Matt Partridge	England	DF	2014–2015	26	1	
Josh Pask †	England	DF	2015–2016	5	0	
Josh Passley	England	DF	2015–2016	38	1	
Marlon Patterson	England	DF	2007–2009	6	0	
Luke Pennell *	England	DF	2016	5	0	
Nathaniel Pinney †	England	FW	2010	1	0	
George Porter	England	MF	2014–2015	19	1	
Dave Rainford	England	MF	2007–2008	29	8	
Frankie Raymond	England	MF	2014–2016	12	2	
Jake Reed	England	FW	2011–2013	31	1	
Ben Reeves †	Northern Ireland ‡	MF	2012	5	0	
Matt Richards	England	MF	2015–2016	10	0	
Matt Ritchie †	Scotland ‡	MF	2008–2009	37	11	
Tony Roberts ‡	Wales ‡	GK	2007–2012	175	0	
Richard Rose	England	DF	2011–2012	10	1	
Brian Saah	England	DF	2013–2015	66	0	
Dominic Samuel †	England	FW	2014	1	0	
Matthew Saunders	England	MF	2011–2014	41	4	
Sam Saunders	England	MF	2007–2009	62	14	
Bas Savage	England	FW	2010–2011	36	3	
Damian Scannell	England	MF	2010–2011	34	2	
Josh Scott	England	FW	2009–2014	105	15	
Jordan Seabright	England	GK	2012–2014	8	0	
Mo Shariff †	England	FW	2013	4	0	
James Shea †	England	GK	2011	1	0	
Jimmy Shepherd	England	DF	2016	2	0	
Sean Shields	Northern Ireland	MF	2013–2015	13	0	
Toni Silva †	Guinea-Bissau ‡	MF	2013	4	0	
Sam Sloma	England	MF	2007–2008	29	2	
Ross Smith	Canada	DF	2007–2008	23	1	
Glen Southam	England	MF	2007–2009	75	3	
Michael Spillane ‡	Republic of Ireland	MF	2011–2013	53	8	
Danny Spiller	England	MF	2009–2010	10	0	
Ben Strevens	England	FW	2007–2019; 2013	106	30	
Frankie Sutherland †	Republic of Ireland	MF	2015	4	0	
Solomon Taiwo ‡	Nigeria	MF	2007–2009; 2010–2011	72	4	
Jamie Taylor	England	FW	2007–2008	12	1	
Quade Taylor †	England	DF	2016	2	0	
Tommy Tejan-Sie	England	MF	2007–2011	4	0	
Wes Thomas	England	FW	2008–2010	28	3	
Ed Thompson	England	GK	2007–2009	4	0	
Stuart Thurgood	England	MF	2009–2010	17	0	
Gavin Tomlin	England	MF	2010–2012	36	2	
Blair Turgott †	England	MF	2014	5	0	
Seth Nana Twumasi †	England	DF	2009–2010	8	2	
Anwar Uddin	England	DF	2007–2010	64	1	
Kyle Vassell †	England	FW	2015–2016	8	0	
Romain Vincelot ‡	France	MF	2010–2011	55	13	
Phil Walsh	England	FW	2010–2012	20	0	
Charlie Wassmer †	England	DF	2012	1	0	
Eoin Wearen †	Republic of Ireland	DF	2012	2	0	
Joe Widdowson	England	DF	2014–2016	51	0	
Luke Wilkinson ‡	England	DF	2010–2014	65	6	
Sam Williams	England	FW	2011–2013	43	10	
Brian Woodall	England	FW	2011–2014	75	13	
Joe Worrall †	England	DF	2016	14	1	
Adeoye Yusuff	England	FW	2014–2016	19	2	
