= 2015–16 Dagenham & Redbridge F.C. season =

Dagenham & Redbridge
2015–16 season
- Chairman: Dave Bennett
- Manager: Wayne Burnett (until 21 December 2015); John Still (from 1 January 2016)
- Stadium: Victoria Road
- League Two: 23rd (Relegated)
- FA Cup: Third round
- League Cup: First round
- League Trophy: Southern quarter final
- Top goalscorer: League: Christian Doidge (8); All: Christian Doidge & Jamie Cureton (9)
- Highest home attendance: 3,336 (v Leyton Orient, League Two, 15 August 2015)
- Lowest home attendance: 900 (v Morecambe, FA Cup, 7 November 2015)
- Average home league attendance: 1,979
Home colours	Away colours

The 2015–16 season is Dagenham & Redbridge's 9th season in the Football League and fifth consecutive season in League Two. Along with competing in League Two, the club will also participate in the FA Cup, League Cup and League Trophy. The season covers the period from 1 July 2015 to 30 June 2016.

== Match details ==
=== Football League Two ===
==== League table ====
Pos	Team	Pld	W	D	L	GF	GA	GD	Pts	Promotion, qualification or relegation
20	Crawley Town	46	13	8	25	45	78	−33	47	
21	Morecambe	46	12	10	24	69	91	−22	46	
22	Newport County	46	10	13	23	43	64	−21	43	
23	Dagenham & Redbridge (R)	46	8	10	28	46	81	−35	34	Relegation to the National League
24	York City (R)	46	7	13	26	51	87	−36	34	Relegation to the National League

Updated to match(es) played on 7 May 2016. Source: BBC Sport
Rules for classification: 1) Points; 2) Goal difference; 3) Number of goals scored
(R) Relegated

==== Matches ====
Football League Two match details
Date	League position	Opponents	Venue	Result	Score F–A	Scorers	Attendance	Ref
8 August 2015	22nd	Portsmouth	A	L	0–3		16,948	
15 August 2015	24th	Leyton Orient	H	L	1–3	Cureton 90'	3,336	
18 August 2015	24th	Exeter City	H	L	1–2	Jones 86'	1,567	
22 August 2015	24th	Wycombe Wanderers	A	D	1–1	McClure 7'	3,343	
29 August 2015	23rd	Stevenage	H	D	1–1	Hemmings 29'	1,653	
5 September 2015	20th	Northampton Town	A	W	2–1	McClure (2) 28', 39'	4,032	
12 September 2015	21st	Carlisle United	A	L	1–2	Doidge 11'	3,871	
19 September 2015	23rd	Newport County	H	D	0–0		1,654	
26 September 2015	22nd	Barnet	A	L	1–3	Jones 66'	2,079	
29 September 2015	23rd	Notts County	H	D	1–1	Jones 72'	1,327	
3 October 2015	23rd	Mansfield Town	H	L	3–4	McClure 9', Chambers (2) 30', 32'	1,597	
10 October 2015	23rd	Yeovil Town	A	D	2–2	Ferdinand 18', Raymond 44'	3,204	
17 October 2015	23rd	Hartlepool United	H	L	0–1		1,771	
20 October 2015	22nd	York City	A	D	2–2	Hemmings 31', Cureton 56'	2,559	
24 October 2015	24th	Accrington Stanley	A	L	1–3	Nosworthy 62'	1,104	
1 November 2015	24th	Luton Town	H	L	0–2		2,723	
21 November 2015	24th	Oxford United	H	L	0–1		1,980	
24 November 2015	22nd	AFC Wimbledon	A	W	1–0	Cureton 80'	3,557	
28 November 2015	22nd	Plymouth Argyle	H	D	1–1	Labadie 59'	2,334	
1 December 2015	22nd	Morecambe	A	L	0–1		1,027	
12 December 2015	22nd	Crawley Town	A	L	2–3	Doidge 64', Cureton 85'	1,543	
19 December 2015	24th	Bristol Rovers	H	L	0–3		1,820	
26 December 2015	24th	Cambridge United	H	L	0–3		2,425	
28 December 2015	23rd	Stevenage	A	W	3–1	Chambers 18', Labadie 19', Doidge 37'	3,152	
2 January 2016	22nd	Exeter City	A	W	2–1	Labadie 11', Chambers 74'	3,451	
16 January 2016	22nd	Northampton Town	H	L	1–2	Doidge 62'	2,379	
23 January 2016	23rd	Newport County	A	D	2–2	Doidge 1', Worrall 6'	2,323	
6 February 2016	23rd	Cambridge United	A	L	0–1		4,494	
9 February 2016	23rd	Wycombe Wanderers	H	L	1–2	Guttridge 72'	1,446	
13 February 2016	24th	Barnet	H	L	0–2		1,728	
20 February 2016	24th	Mansfield Town	A	L	2–3	Hawkins 42', Cureton 86'	2,822	
27 February 2016	24th	Yeovil Town	H	L	0–1		2,942	
27 February 2016	24th	Notts County	A	D	0–0		3,147	
5 March 2016	24th	York City	H	W	1–0	Passley 78'	1,767	
8 March 2016	24th	Carlisle United	H	D	0–0		1,695	
12 March 2016	24th	Hartlepool United	A	L	1–3	Cash 33'	3,947	
15 March 2016	24th	Oxford United	A	L	0–4		5,319	
19 March 2016	24th	Accrington Stanley	H	L	0–1		1,345	
5 April 2016	24th	Morecambe	H	W	2–1	Labadie 8', Cureton 30'	1,233	
9 April 2016	24th	Portsmouth	H	L	1–4	Hemmings 34'	3,122	
12 April 2016	24th	Luton Town	A	L	0–1		6,997	
16 April 2016	24th	Leyton Orient	A	L	2–3	Cureton 59', Dikamona 60'	5,696	
19 April 2016	24th	AFC Wimbledon	H	L	0–2		2,027	
23 April 2016	24th	Plymouth Argyle	A	W	3–2	Dikamona 13', Cash 24', Doidge 41'	9,211	
30 April 2016	23rd	Crawley Town	H	W	3–0	Doidge (2) 51', 53', Hemmings 80'	1,643	
7 May 2016	23rd	Bristol Rovers	A	L	1–2	Cash 12'	11,130	

=== FA Cup ===
FA Cup match details
Round	Date	Opponents	Venue	Result	Score F–A	Scorers	Attendance	Ref
First round	7 November 2015	Morecambe	H	D	0–0		900	
First round replay	17 November 2015	Morecambe	A	W	4–2	Vassell (2) 13' pen., 50', Dunne 37', Labadie 70'	1,176	
Second round	6 December 2015	Whitehawk	H	D	1–1	Cureton 5'	1,983	
Second round replay	16 December 2015	Whitehawk	A	W	3–2 (a.e.t.)	Vassell 44', Passley 77', Obileye 100'	2,174	
Third round	9 January 2016	Everton	A	L	0–2		30,918	

=== Football League Cup ===
Football League Cup match details
Round	Date	Opponents	Venue	Result	Score F–A	Scorers	Attendance	Ref
First round	11 August 2015	Charlton Athletic	A	L	1–4	Doidge 69'	5,100	

=== Football League Trophy ===
Football League Trophy match details
Round	Date	Opponents	Venue	Result	Score F–A	Scorers	Attendance	Ref
First round	1 September 2015	Cambridge United	A	W	2–0	Hemmings 20', McClure 27'	1,618	
Second round	7 October 2015	Stevenage	A	W	2–1	Cureton 53', Chambers 55'	1,401	
Southern quarter final	11 November 2015	Oxford United	H	L	0–2		1,011	

== Transfers ==
=== In ===
Date	Player	Club†	Fee	Ref
30 June 2015	Nyron Nosworthy	Blackpool	Free	
16 July 2015	Josh Passley	(Fulham)	Free	
16 July 2015	Matt McClure	(Wycombe Wanderers)	Free	
2 August 2015	Matt Richards	(Cheltenham Town)	Free	
6 August 2015	Kane Ferdinand	(Peterborough United)	Free	
11 August 2015	Clévid Dikamona	Poiré-sur-Vie	Free	
30 September 2015	Justin Hoyte	(Millwall)	Free	
15 January 2016	Oliver Hawkins	Hemel Hempstead Town	Undisclosed	
21 January 2016	Luke Guttridge	(Luton Town)	Free	
29 March 2016	Luke Pennell	Dunstable Town	Free	

† Brackets around club names denote the player's contract with that club had expired before he joined Dagenham & Redbridge.

=== Out ===
Date	Player	Club†	Fee	Ref
1 June 2015	Abu Ogogo	Shrewsbury Town	Free	
1 July 2015	Scott Doe	(Boreham Wood)	Released	
1 July 2015	Brian Saah	(Woking)	Released	
1 July 2015	Billy Bingham	(Crewe Alexandra)	Released	
1 July 2015	Luke Howell	(Boreham Wood)	Released	
1 July 2015	Bradley Goldberg	(Bromley)	Released	
1 July 2015	Mason Bloomfield	(Chelmsford City)	Released	
1 July 2015	Jon Nouble	(Bishop's Stortford)	Released	
25 August 2015	Matt Partridge	(Basingstoke Town)	Released	
1 February 2016	Kane Ferdinand	(East Thurrock United)	Released	
9 February 2016	Nyron Nosworthy		Retired	

† Brackets around club names denote the player joined that club after his Dagenham & Redbridge contract expired.

=== Loans in ===
Date	Name	From	End date	Ref
6 August 2015	Niko Hämäläinen	Queens Park Rangers	10 October 2015	
18 August 2015	Ayo Obileye	Charlton Athletic	2 January 2016	
7 October 2015	Jake Mulraney	Queens Park Rangers	5 December 2015	
9 October 2015	Frankie Sutherland	Queens Park Rangers	5 November 2015	
16 October 2015	Josh Pask	West Ham United	16 January 2016	
28 October 2015	James Dunne	Portsmouth	2 January 2016	
6 November 2015	Kyle Vassell	Peterborough United	2 January 2016	
7 January 2016	Ollie Muldoon	Charlton Athletic	End of the season	
8 January 2016	Joe Worrall	Nottingham Forest	5 April 2016	
14 January 2016	Harry Hickford	Milton Keynes Dons	14 February 2016	
1 February 2016	Dominic Hyam	Reading	7 May 2016	
4 March 2016	Matty Cash	Nottingham Forest	End of the season	
15 March 2016	Quade Taylor	Bolton Wanderers	End of the season	

=== Loans out ===
Date	Name	From	End date	Ref
13 August 2015	Ian Gayle	St Albans City	13 September 2015	
4 September 2015	Adeoye Yusuff	St Albans City	3 October 2015	
14 October 2015	Adeoye Yusuff	Leatherhead	14 November 2015	
6 November 2015	Ian Gayle	Bishop's Stortford	2 January 2016	
21 November 2015	Adeoye Yusuff	East Thurrock United	5 January 2016	
1 February 2016	Ian Gayle	Welling United	End of season	
1 February 2016	Adeoye Yusuff	Welling United	End of season	
18 March 2016	Jodi Jones	Coventry City	End of season	

== Appearances and goals ==
Numbers in parentheses denote appearances as substitute.
Players with names struck through and marked † left the club during the playing season.
Players with names in italics and marked * were on loan from another club with Dagenham & Redbridge.
Players listed with no appearances have been in the matchday squad but only as unused substitutes.
Key to positions: GK – Goalkeeper; DF – Defender; MF – Midfielder; FW – Forward

Players contracted for the 2015–16 season
No.	Pos.	Nat.	Name	League		FA Cup		League Cup		FL Trophy		Total		Discipline	
No.	Pos.	Nat.	Name	Apps	Goals	Apps	Goals	Apps	Goals	Apps	Goals	Apps	Goals	A yellow rectangle, denoting the yellow penalty card shown to a player being cautioned	A red rectangle, denoting the red penalty card shown to a player being sent off
1	GK	ENG	Liam O'Brien	24	0	1	0	0	0	2	0	27	0	0	0
2	DF	ENG	Josh Passley	36 (2)	1	4	1	0 (1)	0	3	0	43 (3)	2	4	1
3	DF	IRL	Jack Connors	7 (2)	0	2 (1)	0	0	0	1	0	10 (3)	0	4	0
4	MF	ENG	Joss Labadie	26 (2)	4	5	1	0	0	1	0	32 (2)	5	12	0
5	DF	JAM	~~Nyron Nosworthy~~ †	16 (1)	1	5	0	1	0	1	0	23 (1)	1	4	0
6	DF	CGO	Clévid Dikamona	23 (4)	1	3	0	1	0	2 (1)	0	29 (5)	1	4	0
7	FW	ENG	Jamie Cureton	21 (17)	7	4 (1)	1	0	0	1 (1)	1	26 (19)	9	2	0
8	MF	TRI	Andre Boucaud	21 (4)	0	1 (1)	0	1	0	0	0	23 (5)	0	1	0
9	FW	NIR	Matt McClure	11 (9)	4	0 (1)	0	1	0	2	1	14 (10)	5	1	1
10	MF	ENG	Ashley Chambers	22 (10)	4	2 (1)	0	1	0	3	1	28 (11)	5	3	0
11	MF	ENG	Zavon Hines	1 (5)	0	0	0	0	0	0 (1)	0	1 (6)	0	0	0
12	FW	WAL	Christian Doidge	29 (6)	8	1 (2)	0	0 (1)	1	2 (1)	0	32 (10)	9	4	0
14	MF	ENG	Matt Richards	9 (1)	0	0	0	0	0	1	0	10 (1)	0	0	0
15	FW	ENG	~~Kyle Vassell~~ * †	4 (4)	0	4	3	0	0	0	0	8 (4)	3	3	0
15	FW	ENG	Oliver Hawkins	4 (14)	1	0	0	0	0	0	0	4 (14)	1	2	0
16	DF	ENG	Ian Gayle	0	0	0	0	0	0	0	0	0	0	0	0
17	MF	ENG	Jodi Jones	12 (15)	3	1 (2)	0	1	0	1	0	15 (17)	3	1	0
18	MF	ENG	Frankie Raymond	8 (2)	1	1	0	0	0	1 (1)	0	10 (3)	1	0	0
19	FW	ENG	Adeoye Yusuff	0 (1)	0	0	0	0	0	0	0	0 (1)	0	0	0
20	MF	FIN	~~Niko Hämäläinen~~ * †	1	0	0	0	1	0	0	0	2	0	0	0
20	DF	ENG	Quade Taylor *	1 (1)	0	0	0	0	0	0	0	1 (1)	0	0	0
21	DF	ENG	~~Matt Partridge~~ †	2	0	0	0	1	0	0	0	3	0	0	0
21	MF	IRL	~~Frankie Sutherland~~ * †	2 (2)	0	0	0	0	0	0	0	2 (2)	0	0	0
21	MF	ENG	Ollie Muldoon *	18	0	1	0	0	0	0	0	19	0	2	0
22	MF	IRL	~~Jake Mulraney~~ * †	3 (3)	0	1	0	0	0	0 (2)	0	4 (5)	0	0	0
22	MF	ENG	Luke Guttridge	2 (1)	1	0	0	0	0	0	0	2 (1)	1	0	0
23	MF	ENG	Ashley Hemmings	37 (2)	4	4	0	0 (1)	0	3	1	44 (3)	5	2	0
24	DF	ENG	~~Josh Pask~~ * †	5	0	0	0	0	0	1	0	6	0	1	0
24	DF	ENG	~~Joe Worrall~~ * †	14	1	1	0	0	0	0	0	15	1	1	0
25	MF	IRL	~~Kane Ferdinand~~ †	14 (1)	1	0	0	1	0	2	0	17 (1)	1	4	0
25	MF	ENG	Matty Cash *	12	3	0	0	0	0	0	0	12	3	1	0
26	MF	ENG	~~James Dunne~~ * †	9	0	4	1	0	0	1	0	14	1	3	1
26	DF	SCO	Dominic Hyam *	16	0	0	0	0	0	0	0	16	0	0	0
27	DF	ENG	Scott Mitchell	0	0	0	0	0	0	0	0	0	0	0	0
28	DF	ENG	Jimmy Shepherd	2	0	0	0	0	0	0	0	2	0	0	0
29	DF	ENG	~~Ayo Obileye~~ * †	15 (1)	0	2	1	0	0	2 (1)	0	19 (2)	1	5	0
29	DF	ENG	Luke Pennell	4 (1)	0	0	0	0	0	0	0	4 (1)	0	0	0
30	GK	ENG	Mark Cousins	22 (1)	0	4	0	1	0	1	0	28 (1)	0	0	0
31	MF	ENG	Tyrique Hyde	0	0	0	0	0	0	0	0	0	0	0	0
32	DF	TRI	Justin Hoyte	23 (3)	0	2	0	0	0	1	0	26 (3)	0	3	0
33	DF	ENG	Joe Widdowson	31	0	2	0	1	0	1	0	35	0	6	0
34	DF	ENG	~~Harry Hickford~~ * †	0	0	0	0	0	0	0	0	0	0	0	0
34	MF	ENG	Kai Heather	0	0	0	0	0	0	0	0	0	0	0	0
35	GK	ENG	Lewis Moore	0	0	0	0	0	0	0	0	0	0	0	0
