= Ian Gayle =

English footballer (born 1992)

Personal information
- Full name: Ian George Gayle
- Date of birth: 23 October 1992 (age 34)
- Place of birth: Welling, England
- Height: 1.83 m (6 ft 0 in)
- Position: Defender

Team information
- Current team: Whitstable Town

Youth career
- 2010–2011: Dagenham & Redbridge

Senior career*
Years	Team	Apps	(Gls)
2011–2016	Dagenham & Redbridge	10	(0)
2011	→ St Neots Town (loan)	8	(0)
2011	→ Grays Athletic (loan)	1	(0)
2011–2012	→ Kingstonian (loan)	26	(1)
2012	→ Histon (loan)	8	(0)
2013	→ Kingstonian (loan)	12	(0)
2013–2014	→ Grays Athletic (loan)	4	(0)
2014	→ Whitehawk (loan)	2	(0)
2014–2015	→ St Albans City (loan)	14	(0)
2015	→ St Albans City (loan)	8	(0)
2015–2016	→ Bishop's Stortford (loan)	6	(0)
2016	→ Welling United (loan)	16	(2)
2016–2017	Braintree Town	22	(0)
2017–2018	Welling United	17	(0)
2018	Wealdstone	12	(1)
2018–2019	Woking	16	(1)
2019–2022	Eastbourne Borough	28	(1)
2022	→ Cray Valley Paper Mills (dual-reg)	6	(1)
2022–2025	Folkestone Invicta	99	(13)
2025	Lewes	10	(2)
2025–2026	Ramsgate	26	(2)
2026–	Whitstable Town	0	(0)
- * Club domestic league appearances and goals as of 20:26, 26 May 2026 (UTC)

Ian George Gayle (born 23 October 1992) is an English footballer who plays as a defender for Isthmian League South East Division club Whitstable Town.

== Club career ==
Gayle was born in Welling, London Borough of Bexley and is of Jamaican descent. Gayle joined the youth system at Dagenham & Redbridge in 2010 as a scholar. In March 2011, Gayle joined United Counties League Premier Division side St Neots Town on a youth loan. He made his debut for the club against Boston Town, coming on as a substitute in a 3–2 win. His first start for the club came in a 5–2 win over Newport Pagnell Town. His final appearance came in an 8–1 away win against Cogenhoe United, as St Neots clinched the league title. Gayle made a total of eight appearances for St Neots scoring no goals. In May 2011, he completed his scholarship and progressed into the first team after being offered a one-year contract by first-team manager John Still, with the option of a one-year extension.

In August 2011, Gayle joined Isthmian League Division One North side Grays Athletic on a short-term loan deal with an option to extend. He made only one appearance during his loan spell in a 1–1 draw with Heybridge Swifts before returning to the Daggers. In October 2011, he joined Isthmian League Premier Division side Kingstonian on loan until the end of the season. His debut came in the 3–0 away league defeat to A.F.C. Hornchurch, featuring as a substitute. He scored in his first start for the club, in a 3–1 Isthmian League Cup defeat to Margate. He scored the second in a 2–1 win over Dulwich Hamlet in the London Senior Cup quarter final. In March 2012, he scored the winner in a 2–0 league win over Canvey Island. His final game of his loan spell came in April 2012, in a 5–2 defeat to East Thurrock United. Gayle made a total of 31 appearances in all competitions scoring three goals.

In the summer of 2012, Gayle signed a one-year contract extension. In August 2012, he joined Conference North side Histon on loan until January 2013. He made his debut for the club in a 4–1 home defeat to Guiseley. In October 2011, Histon manager Dennis Greene ended Gayle's loan spell and he returned to Dagenham after picking up an injury playing in a training match for his parent club. In January 2013, Gayle re-joined Isthmian League Premier Division side Kingstonian on loan. He played his first match in a 3–1 away win over Carshalton Athletic. In March, his loan was extended until the end of the season. His final game of the loan spell came against Leiston in a 2–2 draw. He made a total of thirteen appearances in all competitions as Kingstonian finished in mid-table.

In the summer of 2013, Gayle was set to be released, however he impressed in pre-season friendlies against Charlton Athletic and Crystal Palace and signed a three-month contract in August with a view to an extension. In November 2013, Gayle returned to Grays Athletic on an initial one-month deal. His first game came in a 1–0 defeat to Canvey Island. In December 2012, his loan was extended for a further month. His final appearance for Grays came in a 3–2 away defeat to Dulwich Hamlet. In January 2014, Gayle returned to the Daggers after his loan spell had been blighted by injuries. In February 2014, Gayle was on the move again joining Conference South side Whitehawk on a one-month loan deal. His debut for the Hawks came in a 2–1 home defeat to Eastbourne Borough. His second and final game for the club came in a 3–1 defeat to Bath City. In April 2014, Gayle finally made his Daggers and Football League debut in a 2–0 defeat to Wycombe Wanderers, replacing Matthew Saunders as a substitute. He went on to make a further three league appearances as the Daggers finished in the top half of the table. In June 2014, he signed a new one-year contract until 2015. After finding it difficult to break into the first team, in November 2014 he was sent to Conference South side St Albans City on an initial one-month. In December 2014, following a 1–0 defeat to Bromley, his loan was extended for a further month. His final game for St Albans came in February 2015, in a 1–1 draw with Basingstoke Town. He returned to Dagenham at the end of the month having made sixteen appearances for the club in all competitions. In August 2015, he re-joined National League South side St Albans City on an initial one-month loan. In November 2015, he joined National League South side Bishop's Stortford on a one-month loan deal. In February 2016, he joined National League side Welling United on loan until the end of the season along with Adeoye Yusuff. In May 2016 as his contract expired, he was released along with eleven players as Dagenham were relegated to the National League.

In August 2016, he signed for National League side Braintree Town on a free transfer following his release by Dagenham. On the opening day of the season, he went onto make his debut during Braintree's 0–0 draw with North Ferriby United, playing the full 90 minutes. Following several major injuries, Gayle's playing time was limited at the National League side and the centre-back only managed to feature just twenty-three more times before leaving for Welling United in June 2017.

On 4 June 2018, following his release from Wealdstone, Gayle joined recently relegated Woking. On the opening day of the 2018–19 campaign, Gayle made his Woking debut during their 1–0 away victory over East Thurrock United, featuring for the entire 90 minutes. Three days later, he scored his first goal for the Surrey-based side, netting the winner in their 2–1 home victory against St Albans City.

In March 2022, Gayle joined Cray Valley Paper Mills on dual-registration basis.

In June 2022, Gayle signed for Isthmian Premier Division side Folkestone Invicta for the 2022/2023 campaign. He departed the club at the end of the 2024–25 season.

In June 2025, Gayle joined Isthmian League Premier Division side Lewes. In October 2025, he joined divisional rivals Ramsgate.

In May 2026, Gayle joined newly promoted Isthmian League South East Division club Whitstable Town.

== Career statistics ==
As of end of 2025–26 season

Appearances and goals by club, season and competition
Club	Season	League			FA Cup		League Cup		Other		Total	
Club	Season	Division	Apps	Goals	Apps	Goals	Apps	Goals	Apps	Goals	Apps	Goals
Dagenham & Redbridge	2010–11	League One	0	0	0	0	0	0	0	0	0	0
Dagenham & Redbridge	2011–12	League Two	0	0	0	0	0	0	0	0	0	0
Dagenham & Redbridge	2012–13	League Two	0	0	0	0	0	0	0	0	0	0
Dagenham & Redbridge	2013–14	League Two	4	0	0	0	0	0	0	0	4	0
Dagenham & Redbridge	2014–15	League Two	6	0	0	0	0	0	0	0	6	0
Dagenham & Redbridge	2015–16	League Two	0	0	—		0	0	0	0	0	0
Dagenham & Redbridge	Total		10	0	0	0	0	0	0	0	10	0
St Neots Town (loan)	2010–11	UCL Premier Division	8	0	—		—		—		8	0
Grays Athletic (loan)	2011–12	IL Division One North	1	0	—		—		—		1	0
Kingstonian (loan)	2011–12	IL Premier Division	26	1	—		—		5 (Note: One appearance and one goal in Isthmian League Cup, four appearances and one goal in London Senior Cup)	2	31	3
Histon (loan)	2012–13	Conference North	8	0	—		—		—		8	0
Kingstonian (loan)	2012–13	IL Premier Division	12	0	—		—		1 (Note: Appearance(s) in London Senior Cup)	0	13	0
Grays Athletic (loan)	2013–14	IL Premier Division	4	0	—		—		3 (Note: One appearance in FA Trophy, two in Isthmian League Cup)	0	7	0
Whitehawk (loan)	2013–14	Conference South	2	0	—		—		—		2	0
St Albans City (loan)	2014–15	Conference South	14	0	—		—		2 (Note: Appearance(s) in FA Trophy)	0	16	0
St Albans City (loan)	2015–16	National League South	8	0	2	0	—		—		10	0
St Albans City (loan)	Total		22	0	2	0	—		2	0	26	0
Bishop's Stortford (loan)	2015–16	National League South	6	0	—		—		2 (Note: One appearance in FA Trophy, one in Herts Senior Cup)	0	8	0
Welling United (loan)	2015–16	National League	16	2	—		—		—		16	2
Braintree Town	2016–17	National League	22	0	2	0	—		0	0	24	0
Welling United	2017–18	National League South	17	0	1	0	—		1	0	19	0
Wealdstone	2017–18	National League South	12	1	—		—		—		12	1
Woking	2018–19	National League South	16	1	4	1	—		0	0	20	2
Eastbourne Borough	2019–20	National League South	28	1	2	0	—		3 (Note: One appearance in Sussex Senior Cup, two appearances in FA Trophy)	0	33	1
Eastbourne Borough	2020–21	National League South	0	0	0	0	—		0	0	0	0
Eastbourne Borough	2021–22	National League South	0	0	0	0	—		0	0	0	0
Eastbourne Borough	Total		28	1	2	0	0	0	3	0	33	1
Cray Valley Paper Mills (dual registration)	2021–22	IL South East Division	6	1	0	0	—		1 (Note: Appearance(s) in Isthmian League South East Division Play-offs)	0	7	1
Folkestone Invicta	2022–23	Isthmian Premier Division	38	6	4	0	—		5 (Note: Four appearances in FA Trophy, one appearance and one goal in Alan Turvey Trophy)	1	47	7
Folkestone Invicta	2023–24	Isthmian League Premier Division	26	2	1	0	—		2 (Note: One appearance in FA Trophy, one appearance in Alan Turvey Trophy)	0	29	2
Folkestone Invicta	2024–25	Isthmian League Premier Division	35	5	1	0	—		1	0	37	5
Folkestone Invicta	Total		99	13	6	0	0	0	8	1	113	14
Lewes	2025–26	Isthmian League Premier Division	10	2	1	0	—		0	0	11	2
Ramsgate	2025–26	Isthmian League Premier Division	26	2	—		—		3 (Note: Appearance(s) in Alan Turvey Trophy)	0	29	2
Career total			351	24	18	1	0	0	29	3	405	28

== Honours ==
=== Club ===
Woking

- National League South play-offs: 2018–19
