= Luke Pennell =

English association football player

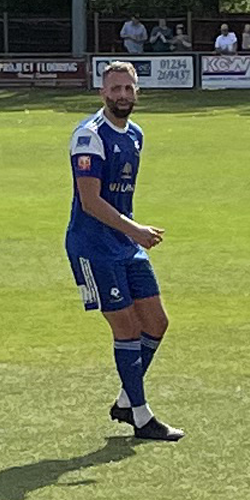
- Pennell playing for Bedford Town in August 2022

Personal information
- Full name: Luke Charles Pennell
- Date of birth: 26 January 1996 (age 30)
- Place of birth: Milton Keynes, England
- Height: 1.90 m (6 ft 3 in)
- Position: Defender

Team information
- Current team: Hayes & Yeading United (on loan from Bedford Town)

Youth career
- Milton Keynes Dons
- 2012–2013: AFC Rushden & Diamonds

Senior career*
Years	Team	Apps	(Gls)
2014	Banbury United	5	(1)
2014–2015	Wolverton Town	2	(0)
2015–2016	Dunstable Town	22	(3)
2016–2019	Dagenham & Redbridge	45	(0)
2019–2020	Maidstone United	7	(0)
2020	Gloucester City	7	(0)
2020–2021	Hemel Hempstead Town	9	(0)
2021–2022	Braintree Town	39	(0)
2022–	Bedford Town	6	(0)
2022–	→ Hayes & Yeading United (loan)	1	(0)

International career^{‡}
2018	England C	2	(1)
- * Club domestic league appearances and goals as of 11:31, 24 October 2022 (UTC) ‡ National team caps and goals as of 20:00, 26 June 2022 (UTC)

Luke Charles Pennell (né Fathers; born 26 January 1996), is an English footballer who plays for Hayes & Yeading United on loan from National League North side Bedford Town, where he plays as a defender.

== Club career ==
Pennell was born in Milton Keynes, Buckinghamshire and attended the Lord Grey School in the town. He started his career with local side Milton Keynes Dons before playing for the football team at Milton Keynes College, which he attended for three years. During this period he also spent time at AFC Rushden & Diamonds, featuring for the under-18 and under-21 sides, making 15 appearances and scoring once between 2012 and 2013. In March 2014, he joined Southern Football League Premier Division side Banbury United for a one-month spell, making six appearances and scoring twice. At the end of the season he joined Spartan South Midlands Football League side Wolverton Town, appearing for the first and reserve sides throughout the year whilst still playing for the College team.

After leaving Milton Keynes College in the summer of 2015, he signed for Southern League Premier Division side Dunstable Town. His form for the Blues alerted professional clubs and Pennell spent time on trial with Premier League side Norwich City and Football League sides Burnley, Fulham, Peterborough United and Fleetwood Town. He was offered a professional contract by League One side Fleetwood Town, but he turned the move down due to financial and logistical problems. However, none of the trials proved successful and Pennell returned to playing for Dunstable in January 2016.

In March 2016, he signed for League Two side Dagenham & Redbridge on a one-year contract with the option of a further year, after manager John Still learned of his availability following his trial at Norwich. He made his professional debut in April 2016, replacing Justin Hoyte as a substitute in a 3–2 defeat to Leyton Orient as the Daggers were relegated to the National League for the first time in nine years. In May 2019, it was announced that he would be released following the expiration of his contract at the end of the 2018–19 campaign.

On 1 July 2019, he signed for National League South side Maidstone United on a free transfer, re-uniting with former Dagenham boss John Still.

Following spells with Gloucester City and Hemel Hempstead Town, Pennell joined Braintree Town ahead of the 2021–22 campaign. During his time in Essex, he went onto feature 42 times as the club fought off relegation from the National League South. He left Braintree at the end of his contract in June 2022.

On 25 June 2022, newly promoted Southern League Premier Division Central side Bedford Town announced the signing of Pennell. In October 2022, Pennell joined Hayes & Yeading United on a one-month loan deal.

== Career statistics ==
As of match played 7 May 2022

Appearances and goals by club, season and competition
Club	Season	League			FA Cup		League Cup		Other		Total	
Club	Season	Division	Apps	Goals	Apps	Goals	Apps	Goals	Apps	Goals	Apps	Goals
Banbury United	2013–14	SL Premier Division	5	1	—		—		1 (Note: Appearances in Buckingham Senior Charity Cup)	1	6	2
Wolverton Town	2014–15	SSM Division Two	2	0	0	0	—		0	0	2	0
Dunstable Town	2015–16	SL Premier Division	22	3	3	0	—		2 (Note: One appearance in FA Trophy, one in Bedfordshire Senior Cup)	0	27	3
Dagenham & Redbridge	2015–16	League Two	5	0	—		—		—		5	0
Dagenham & Redbridge	2016–17	National League	1	0	0	0	—		0	0	1	0
Dagenham & Redbridge	2017–18	National League	22	0	0	0	—		0	0	22	0
Dagenham & Redbridge	2018–19	National League	17	0	2	1	—		0	0	19	1
Dagenham & Redbridge	Total		45	0	2	1	—		0	0	47	1
Maidstone United	2019–20	National League South	7	0	2	0	—		1 (Note: Appearances in FA Trophy)	0	10	0
Gloucester City	2019–20	National League North	7	0	—		—		—		7	0
Hemel Hempstead Town	2020–21	National League South	9	0	1	0	—		0	0	10	0
Braintree Town	2021–22	National League South	39	0	1	0	—		2	0	42	0
Bedford Town	2022–23	Southern League Premier Division Central	0	0	0	0	—		0	0	0	0
Career total			136	4	9	1	—		5	1	151	6
