= Adeoye Yusuff =

English footballer

Personal information
- Full name: Adam Adeoye Oluwaseyi Yusuff
- Date of birth: 25 May 1994 (age 32)
- Place of birth: Lewisham, England
- Height: 1.70 m (5 ft 7 in)
- Position: Striker

Team information
- Current team: Cray Wanderers

Youth career
- 2010–2012: Stevenage

Senior career*
Years	Team	Apps	(Gls)
2012	Stevenage	0	(0)
2012	→ Biggleswade United (loan)	?	(?)
2012–2013	St Neots Town	13	(2)
2013	Banbury United	2	(0)
2013	AFC Hornchurch	3	(1)
2013	Aveley	3	(0)
2013–2014	Chatham Town	37	(23)
2014–2016	Dagenham & Redbridge	19	(2)
2015	→ St Albans City (loan)	3	(0)
2015	→ Leatherhead (loan)	5	(1)
2015–2016	→ East Thurrock United (loan)	7	(4)
2016	→ Welling United (loan)	7	(0)
2016	Chatham Town	5	(1)
2016–2017	Heybridge Swifts	21	(5)
2017–2019	Folkestone Invicta	81	(43)
2019	Dulwich Hamlet	9	(1)
2019	→ Tonbridge Angels (loan)	6	(2)
2019–2020	Dover Athletic	11	(0)
2020–2021	Cray Valley Paper Mills	4	(0)
2021	Braintree Town	4	(1)
2021–2023	Folkestone Invicta	67	(35)
2023–2025	Hornchurch	49	(16)
2024	→ Dartford (dual registration)	5	(1)
2025–2026	Folkestone Invicta	46	(16)
2026–	Cray Wanderers	0	(0)
- * Club domestic league appearances and goals as of 20:40, 20 May 2026 (UTC)

Adam Adeoye Oluwaseyi Yusuff (born 25 May 1994) is an English professional footballer who plays as a striker for Isthmian League Premier Division club Cray Wanderers.

== Career ==
Yusuff started his career in the youth system at Stevenage, signing a two-year scholarship in the summer of 2010. In March 2012, he joined South Midlands League Premier Division side Biggleswade United on work experience. During his time with the club he scored eight goals, including a hat-trick and man-of-the-match display in a 4–2 win over Oxhey Jets.

In April 2012, he was released by Stevenage after he had completed his scholarship. Following his release he enrolled with the Tresham College of Further and Higher Education in Kettering, where he played for the under-21 development side in the Conference Reserve League.

In October 2012, he signed for Southern Football League Premier Division side St Neots Town, where he went on to make fifteen appearances in all competitions scoring twice.

In January 2013, he moved to fellow Southern Football League Premier Division side Banbury United for a brief period, only making two appearances.

In February 2013, he joined Football League Championship side Ipswich Town on trial, featuring in a 4–3 reserve side win over Colchester United.

He started the 2013–14 season with Isthmian League Premier Division side AFC Hornchurch after impressing in pre-season, and he was mainly used in the role of impact substitute, scoring late in games against Margate and Wealdstone. He made a total of fifteen appearances for the Urchins scoring three times.

In November 2013, he joined Isthmian League Division One North side Aveley to get more match practice, however he stayed with the club for less than a month.

Shortly after he signed for fellow Isthmian League Division One North side Chatham Town. He enjoyed a successful ten-month spell at the club scoring 24 goals in 38 appearances, which attracted interest from many Football League clubs. After netting seven goals in the first nine games of the 2014–15 campaign for Chatham, he was signed by Football League Two side Dagenham & Redbridge in September 2014 for an undisclosed fee, signing a one-year contract with the club. Despite turning professional, he kept his job working as a waiter in a Wagamama restaurant in Kent. He made his professional debut in the same month in a 3–2 defeat to Cambridge United, replacing Andre Boucaud as a substitute. His first professional goals for the club came in October 2014, where he scored a brace in the 2–1 victory over Accrington Stanley.

In September 2015, he joined National League South side St Albans City on a one-month loan deal.

In October 2015, he joined Isthmian League Premier Division side Leatherhead on a one-month loan deal.

In November 2015, he was sent out on loan again to the Isthmian League Premier Division joining East Thurrock United.

In February 2016, he joined National League side Welling United on loan until the end of the season along with Ian Gayle.

In May 2016 as his contract expired, he was released along with eleven players as Dagenham were relegated to the National League. In June 2016, following his release he rejoined former club Chatham Town on a free transfer.

He left Folkestone after 102 appearances which saw him score 51 goals and joined Dulwich Hamlet in 2019 before moving to Dover Athletic where he spent the remainder of the 2019–20 season before being released.

Yusuff returned to Folkestone Invicta in May 2021. During the 2021–22 season he scored a total of 29 goals across all competitions, the club finished in sixth place in the Isthmian Premier Division and finished four points outside the play-offs, just behind fifth place Cheshunt, who were promoted to national league south. Yussuf and Folkestone also made it to the Kent Senior Cup final, losing 6–2 to Dartford and taking home a runners-up medal.

On 10 February 2023, Yusuff joined league rivals Hornchurch for an undisclosed fee.

On 7 October 2024, Yusuff joined Dartford on a dual registration deal.

On 3 January 2025, Yusuff returned to Folkestone Invicta for a third spell. He was a member of the Folkestone squad that won the 2025–26 Premier Division title.

On 20 May 2026, he returned to the Isthmian League Premier Division following Folkestone's promotion, joining Cray Wanderers.

== Career statistics ==
As of end of 2025–26 season

Appearances and goals by club, season and competition
Club	Season	League			FA Cup		League Cup		Other		Total	
Club	Season	Division	Apps	Goals	Apps	Goals	Apps	Goals	Apps	Goals	Apps	Goals
Stevenage	2011–12	League One	0	0	0	0	0	0	0	0	0	0
Biggleswade United (loan)	2011–12	Spartan South Midlands League Premier Division	No data currently available									
St Neots Town	2012–13	Southern League Premier Division	13	2	—		—		1 (Note: Appearance(s) in Southern League Cup)	0	14	2
Banbury United	2012–13	Southern League Premier Division	2	0	—		—		—		2	0
AFC Hornchurch	2013–14	Isthmian League Premier Division	3	1	2	1	—		0	0	5	2
Aveley	2013–14	Isthmian League Division One North	3	0	—		—		0	0	3	0
Chatham Town	2013–14	Isthmian League Division One North	28	16	—		—		—		28	16
Chatham Town	2014–15	Isthmian League Division One North	9	7	1	1	—		0	0	10	8
Chatham Town	Total		37	23	1	1	—		0	0	38	24
Dagenham & Redbridge	2014–15	League Two	18	2	—		—		1 (Note: Appearance(s) in Football League Trophy)	0	19	2
Dagenham & Redbridge	2015–16	League Two	1	0	0	0	0	0	0	0	1	0
Dagenham & Redbridge	Total		19	2	0	0	0	0	1	0	20	2
St Albans City (loan)	2015–16	National League South	3	0	0	0	—		0	0	3	0
Leatherhead (loan)	2015–16	Isthmian League Premier Division	5	1	—		—		1 (Note: Appearance(s) in FA Trophy)	0	6	1
East Thurrock United (loan)	2015–16	Isthmian League Premier Division	7	4	—		—		—		7	4
Welling United (loan)	2015–16	National League	7	0	—		—		—		7	0
Chatham Town	2016–17	Isthmian League Division One South	5	1	No data currently available						5	1
Heybridge Swifts	2016–17	Isthmian League Division One North	21	5	—		—		—		21	5
Folkestone Invicta	2017–18	Isthmian League Premier Division	43	27	4	2	—		5 (Note: Two appearances and one goal in Alan Turvey Trophy, two appearances in FA Trophy, one appearance in Isthmian League Premier Division play-offs)	1	52	30
Folkestone Invicta	2018–19	Isthmian League Premier Division	38	16	0	0	—		7 (Note: Four appearances and three goals in Alan Turvey Trophy, three appearances and two goals in FA Trophy)	5	45	21
Folkestone Invicta	Total		81	43	4	2	—		13	6	97	51
Dulwich Hamlet	2019–20	National League South	9	1	4	3	—		1	0	14	4
Tonbridge Angels (loan)	2019–20	National League South	6	2	—		—		—		6	2
Dover Athletic	2019–20	National League	11	0	—		—		—		11	0
Cray Valley Paper Mills	2020–21	Isthmian League South East Division	4	0	6	6	—		1	0	11	6
Braintree Town	2020–21	National League South	4	1	—		—		—		4	1
Folkestone Invicta	2021–22	Isthmian Premier Division	40	15	5	6	—		11 (Note: Five appearances and four goals in FA Trophy, three appearances and two goals in Alan Turvey Trophy and three appearances and two goals in Kent Senior Cup)	8	56	29
Folkestone Invicta	2022–23	Isthmian Premier Division	27	20	4	2	—		4 (Note: Three appearances and two goals in FA Trophy, one appearance and one goal in Alan Turvey Trophy)	3	35	25
Folkestone Invicta	Total		67	35	9	7	—		15	11	91	54
Hornchurch	2022–23	Isthmian Premier Division	17	5	0	0	—		3 (Note: One appearance in the Essex Senior Cup) (Note: Two appearances in the Isthmian Premier Division play-offs)	0	20	5
Hornchurch	2023–24	Isthmian Premier Division	22	10	4	5	—		1 (Note: One appearance in FA Trophy)	0	27	15
Hornchurch	2024–25	National League South	10	1	0	0	—		1	0	11	1
Hornchurch	Total		49	16	4	5	—		5	0	58	21
Dartford (dual registration)	2024–25	Isthmian League Premier Division	5	1	—		—		1 (Note: One appearance in the Kent Senior Cup)	0	6	1
Folkestone Invicta	2024–25	Isthmian League Premier Division	19	6	—		—		0	0	19	6
Folkestone Invicta	2025–26	Isthmian League Premier Division	27	10	2	2	—		1	0	30	12
Folkestone Invicta	Total		46	16	2	2	—		1	0	49	18
Career total			401	150	31	27	0	0	39	17	471	194

== Honours ==
Folkestone Invicta

- Isthmian League Premier Division: 2025–26
