= João Carlos (footballer, born 1989) =

Portuguese footballer

Personal information
- Full name: João Miguel Martins Pais De Carlos
- Date of birth: 2 April 1989 (age 37)
- Place of birth: Portugal
- Height: 5 ft 10 in (1.78 m)
- Positions: Winger; midfielder

Team information
- Current team: Grays Athletic

Senior career*
Years	Team	Apps	(Gls)
	Clapton	?	(?)
2007–2008	Brentwood Town	?	(?)
2008–2009	Aveley	?	(?)
2009–2010	Dagenham & Redbridge	1	(0)
2010	Brentwood Town	?	(?)
2010–2011	Thurrock	27	(2)
2011–2016	Grays Athletic	210	(59)
2016	→ Concord Rangers (dual registration)	8	(2)
2016	Concord Rangers	13	(2)
2016–2021	Grays Athletic	128	(27)
2021–2023	Hullbridge Sports	?	(?)
2023–	Grays Athletic	?	(?)
- * Club domestic league appearances and goals as of 14:09, 30 October 2021 (UTC)

João Miguel Martins Pais De Carlos (born 2 April 1989) is a semi-professional Portuguese footballer who plays as a winger for Isthmian League North Division club Grays Athletic in England.

== Football career ==
Carlos played non-League football for Clapton and Brentwood Town, before signing for Aveley in 2008. He signed for Dagenham & Redbridge on non-contract terms at the start of November 2009. Carlos made his debut for Dagenham & Redbridge on 20 February 2010, in the 3–1 away defeat to Rochdale, replacing Jon Nurse as a substitute in the 75th minute.

In August 2010, Carlos re-signed for Isthmian League Division One North club Brentwood Town alongside Ryan Doyle, before moving to Conference South side Thurrock in October 2010. He went on to sign for Isthmian League Division One North club Grays Athletic in June 2011. At the end of the 2011–12 season, Carlos was voted as Club Player of the Year, voted for by club officials.

Carlos signed for National League South club Concord Rangers on 22 March 2016 on dual registration terms from Grays Athletic. He went on to sign for the club on a permanent basis the following season, before returning to Grays Athletic on 11 December 2016 alongside Luke Wilson. Carlos left the club in July 2021 having amassed over 400 appearances for the club.

== Playing style ==
John Still described Carlos as "a tricky winger who likes to run at people and wants to beat them".
