= Quade Taylor =

English footballer

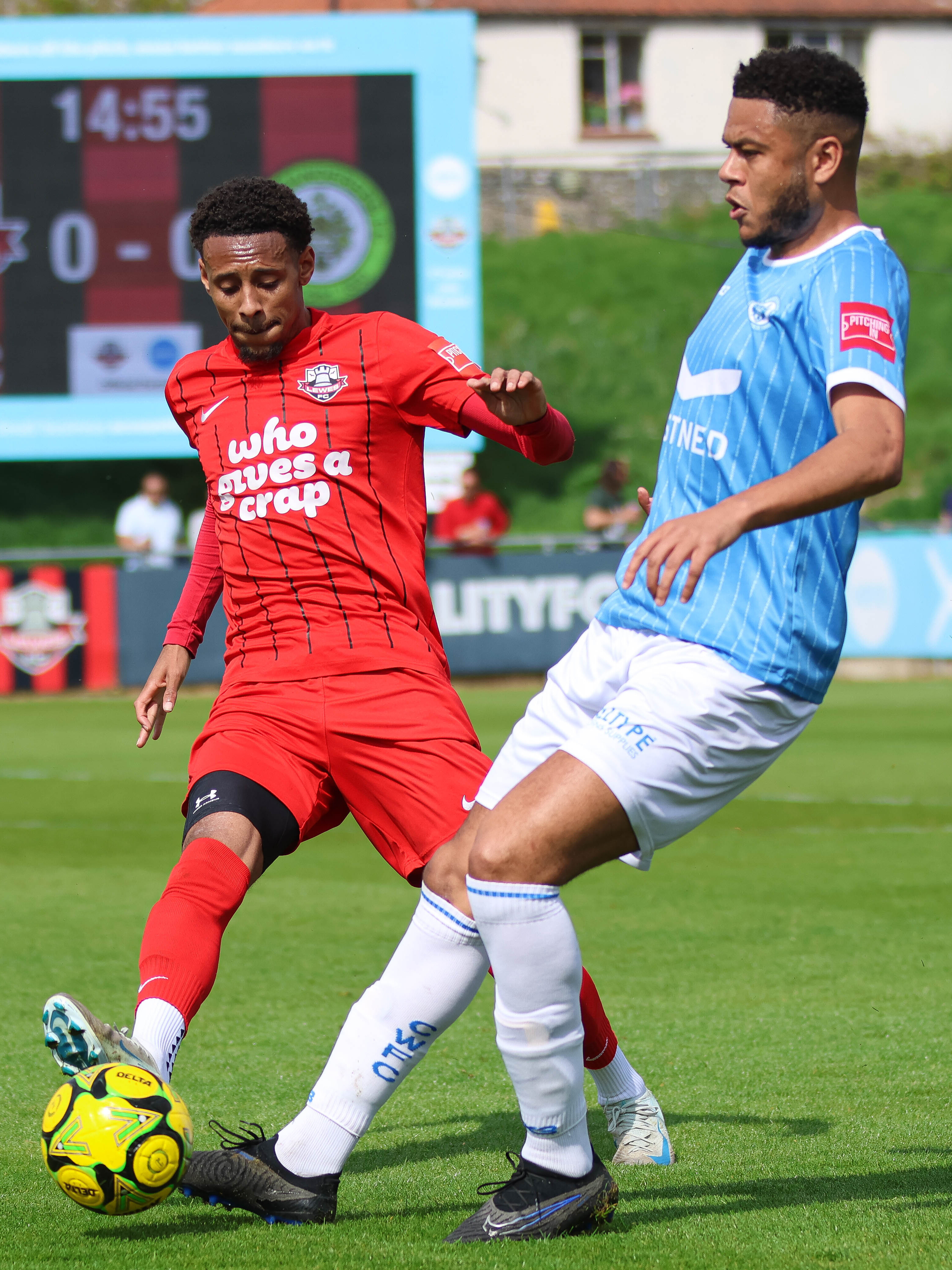
- Taylor (right) playing for Cray Wanderers in April 2025

Personal information
- Full name: Quade Gerald Taylor
- Date of birth: 11 December 1993 (age 32)
- Place of birth: Tooting, England
- Height: 1.91 m (6 ft 3 in)
- Position: Defender

Team information
- Current team: Cray Wanderers

Youth career
- 2010–2011: Dulwich Hamlet
- 2011–2012: Crystal Palace

Senior career*
Years	Team	Apps	(Gls)
2012–2014	Crystal Palace	0	(0)
2014	→ Welling United (loan)	9	(1)
2014–2016	Bolton Wanderers	1	(0)
2016	→ Dagenham & Redbridge (loan)	2	(0)
2016	Braintree Town	0	(0)
2016–2023	Dulwich Hamlet	169	(8)
2023	Carshalton Athletic	0	(0)
2023	Hastings United	2	(0)
2024	Corinthian-Casuals	19	(2)
2024–	Cray Wanderers	57	(3)
- * Club domestic league appearances and goals as of 10:13, 1 April 2026 (UTC)

Quade Gerald Taylor (born 11 December 1993) is an English footballer who plays for Cray Wanderers.

== Career ==
=== Early career ===
Taylor joined Dulwich Hamlet's youth academy aged 16, in the summer of 2010, and spent seven months at the club before joining Crystal Palace in March 2011. In the summer of 2012, Taylor signed a two-year professional contract with Crystal Palace committing his future until the summer of 2014. In March 2014, Taylor signed a loan deal with Conference side Welling United that lasted a month. During his loan spell, Taylor made nine league appearances and scored one league goal. At the end of the 2013–14 season, Taylor was released by Crystal Palace along with 11 others.

=== Bolton Wanderers ===
In July 2014, Taylor signed a one-year professional contract with Championship side Bolton Wanderers. He became a regular in the reserve side appearing in 20 league games and this resulted in Taylor making his first-team debut on the last day of the 2014–15 season against Birmingham City which Bolton lost 1–0 and Taylor played the full 90 minutes of the match. He said after making his professional debut, "The Birmingham game was a bit crazy – it was all new and a bit daunting, but I personally felt as though it couldn't have gone any better aside from the result. I just felt really at home in the team. I didn't have any idea that I was going to be starting the game either – I was obviously included in the matchday squad, but I didn't find out until we were in the dressing room beforehand." After making his debut, Taylor was rewarded with a 12-month contract extension that kept him at the Macron Stadium until the summer of 2016.

In March 2016, he joined League Two side Dagenham & Redbridge on loan until the end of the season.

At the end of the 2015–16 season, the club confirmed that he would be leaving when his contract expired at the end of June.

=== Non-league ===
Following his release from Bolton Wanderers, Taylor signed for National League side Braintree Town in August 2016, following a trial period throughout the summer. Shortly after he arrived at the club, his contract was terminated and he had a short spell out of the game. In October 2016, he returned to former club Dulwich Hamlet of the Isthmian League Premier Division on a free transfer.

In May 2023, Taylor joined Carshalton Athletic. Having failed to make an appearance, he joined Hastings United in September 2023. Having joined Corinthian-Casuals, he made his debut on 1 January 2024.

In July 2024, Taylor joined Isthmian Premier Division side Cray Wanderers.

== Personal life ==
During the earlier part of his career, he struggled with a gambling addiction.

== Career statistics ==
As of match played 16 January 2021

Appearances and goals by club, season and competition
Club	Season	League			FA Cup		League Cup		Other		Total	
Club	Season	Division	Apps	Goals	Apps	Goals	Apps	Goals	Apps	Goals	Apps	Goals
Crystal Palace	2012–13	Championship	0	0	0	0	0	0	0	0	0	0
Crystal Palace	2013–14	Premier League	0	0	0	0	0	0	—		0	0
Crystal Palace	Total		0	0	0	0	0	0	0	0	0	0
Welling United (loan)	2013–14	Conference Premier	9	1	—		—		—		9	1
Bolton Wanderers	2014–15	Championship	1	0	0	0	0	0	—		1	0
Bolton Wanderers	2015–16	Championship	0	0	0	0	0	0	—		0	0
Bolton Wanderers	Total		1	0	0	0	0	0	—		1	0
Dagenham & Redbridge (loan)	2015–16	League Two	2	0	—		—		—		2	0
Braintree Town	2016–17	National League	0	0	—		—		—		0	0
Dulwich Hamlet	2016–17	IL Premier Division	11	0	—		—		8 (Note: Appearances in FA Trophy and Alan Turvey Trophy)	1	19	1
Dulwich Hamlet	2017–18	IL Premier Division	35	0	0	0	—		5	0	40	0
Dulwich Hamlet	2018–19	National League South	31	0	2	0	—		1 (Note: Appearances in FA Trophy)	0	34	0
Dulwich Hamlet	2019–20	National League South	27	1	3	1	—		4 (Note: Appearances in FA Trophy and London County Cup)	0	32	2
Dulwich Hamlet	2020–21	National League South	10	0	1	0	—		2	1	13	1
Total			114	1	6	1	—		20	2	140	4
Career total			126	2	6	1	0	0	20	2	152	5
