= Josh Passley =

English footballer (born 1994)

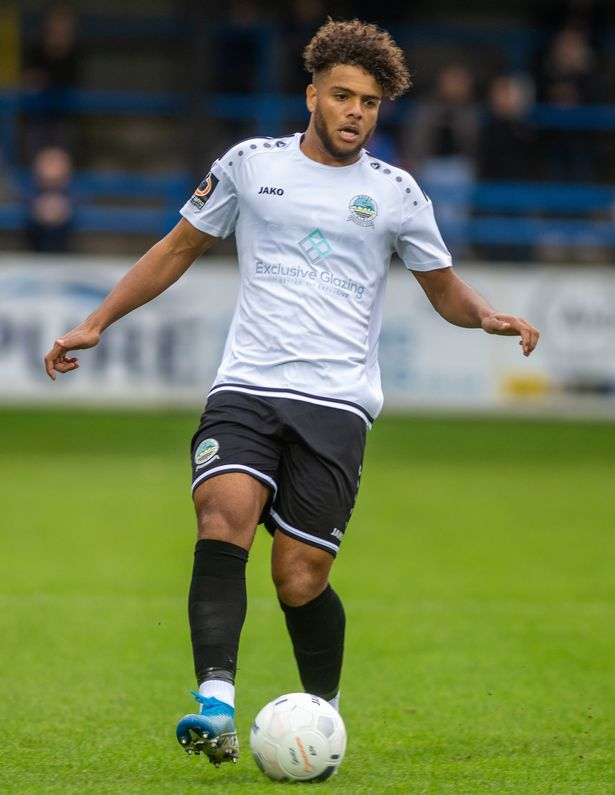
- Passley playing for Dover in 2020

Personal information
- Full name: Joshua Jordan Passley
- Date of birth: 21 November 1994 (age 31)
- Place of birth: Chelsea, England
- Height: 6 ft 0 in (1.84 m)
- Position: Defender

Team information
- Current team: Ebbsfleet United
- Number: 7

Youth career
- 2005–2013: Fulham

Senior career*
Years	Team	Apps	(Gls)
2013–2015	Fulham	0	(0)
2014–2015	→ Shrewsbury Town (loan)	6	(0)
2015	→ Portsmouth (loan)	12	(0)
2015–2016	Dagenham & Redbridge	38	(1)
2017	Whitehawk	13	(2)
2017–2021	Dover Athletic (Note: All Dover Athletic players' statistics for the 2020–21 season were expunged due to staff being furloughed because of the costs associated with the COVID-19 pandemic, Passley made 7 league appearances during this season.)	94	(1)
2021–2023	Havant & Waterlooville	67	(1)
2023–2025	Bromley	39	(3)
2025	→ Ebbsfleet United (loan)	3	(0)
2025–	Ebbsfleet United	0	(0)
- * Club domestic league appearances and goals as of 15:07, 21 February 2025 (UTC)

Joshua Jordan Passley (born 21 November 1994) is an English professional footballer who plays as a defender for Ebbsfleet United.

== Career ==
=== Fulham ===
Passley started his football career at Fulham and joined them at age eleven. He was initially a winger but switched to right back at sixteen, as well as playing at centre-back. Passley signed his first professional contract in 2013. On 26 January 2014 he made his debut for Fulham in a 1–1 draw against Sheffield United in the FA Cup fourth round, playing the full ninety minutes.

Passley joined Shrewsbury Town on a youth loan on 27 November 2014. He made his Football League debut two days later in a 1–0 win over Burton Albion at New Meadow. Despite being ever-present for the duration of his loan period, he returned to his parent club when his loan deal ended on 5 January 2015.

On 29 January 2015, Passley joined Portsmouth on an initial one-month youth loan. He made his Portsmouth debut two days later, playing 90 minutes in a 0–0 draw at Wycombe Wanderers. During his run of first team games, he helped the club achieve three clean sheets in three games, playing in a wing-back role. This was the same position he played while at Shrewsbury Town. Having made six appearances, Passley's loan spell with Portsmouth was extended for another month and again until the end of the season. His loan spell with Pompey came to an end on 12 April 2015 when he was taken off injured in the 83rd minute after losing consciousness in a defeat at Morecambe.

At the end of the 2014–15 season, Passley was among nine players to leave Fulham.

=== Dagenham & Redbridge ===
Passley joined League Two Dagenham & Redbridge on a one-year deal in July 2015. Despite being a virtual ever-present for The Daggers in his first season, Passley was among eleven players to leave following relegation to the National League.

=== Whitehawk ===
Passley joined National League South club Whitehawk in February 2017, the team he scored against in an FA Cup second round replay on 16 December 2015 in a match televised live on BT Sport. After helping Whitehawk secure safety in the National League South Passley left the club at the end of the season.

=== Dover Athletic ===
On 19 July 2017, Passley signed for Dover Athletic on a one-year deal. Passley started on the opening day of the season in a 1–0 away victory to Hartlepool United.

Passley signed a one-year contract extension on 21 April 2018 after making 33 appearances in his debut season for the club. Passley scored his first goal for the club in the last match of the 2018–19 season, winning and scoring a last minute penalty in a 3–0 victory over Sutton United. Following's Dover's decision to not play any more matches in the 2020–21 season, made in late January, and subsequent null and voiding of all results, on 5 May 2021 it was announced that Passley was out of contract and had left the club.

=== Havant & Waterlooville ===
On 21 May 2021, Passley dropped down a division to join National League South side Havant & Waterlooville on a free transfer, after reportedly turning down offers to remain in the National League.

=== Bromley ===
On 28 June 2023, Passley signed for National League side Bromley for an undisclosed fee.

Following promotion, Passley had a contract extension clause triggered, extended for the 2024–25 season.

=== Ebbsfleet United ===
On 4 February 2025, Passley returned to the National League, joining bottom side Ebbsfleet United on loan for the remainder of the season. On 20 February, he joined the club permanently on a contract until the end of the 2025–26 season.

== Career statistics ==
As of 5 May 2021

Appearances and goals by club, season and competition
Club	Season	League			FA Cup		League Cup		Other		Total	
Club	Season	Division	Apps	Goals	Apps	Goals	Apps	Goals	Apps	Goals	Apps	Goals
Fulham	2013–14	Premier League	0	0	2	0	0	0	—		2	0
Fulham	2014–15	Championship	0	0	—		0	0	—		0	0
Fulham	Total		0	0	2	0	0	0	—		2	0
Shrewsbury Town (loan)	2014–15	League Two	6	0	1	0	—		—		7	0
Portsmouth (loan)	2014–15	League Two	12	0	—		—		—		12	0
Dagenham & Redbridge	2015–16	League Two	38	1	4	1	1	0	3 (Note: Appearances in Football League Trophy)	0	46	2
Whitehawk	2016–17	National League South	13	2	—		—		—		13	2
Dover Athletic	2017–18	National League	34	0	2	0	—		2 (Note: Appearances in FA Trophy)	0	38	0
Dover Athletic	2018–19	National League	31	1	2	0	—		2	0	35	1
Dover Athletic	2019–20	National League	29	0	1	0	—		1	0	31	0
Dover Athletic	Total		94	1	5	0	—		4	0	104	1
Career total			166	4	12	1	1	0	7	0	184	5
