= Jimmy Shepherd =

English footballer (born 1997)

Personal information
- Full name: James Frederick Alan Shepherd
- Date of birth: 23 December 1997 (age 28)
- Place of birth: Newham, England
- Height: 1.82 m (6 ft 0 in)
- Position: Defender

Youth career
- 2009–2016: Dagenham & Redbridge

Senior career*
Years	Team	Apps	(Gls)
2016–2017	Dagenham & Redbridge	4	(0)
2016	→ East Thurrock United (loan)	2	(0)
2016	→ Barkingside (loan)	11	(0)
2016	→ Hayes & Yeading United (loan)	5	(0)
2016	→ Egham Town (loan)	7	(0)
2016–2017	→ Billericay Town (loan)	4	(0)
2017	→ Whitehawk (loan)	5	(0)
2017	→ East Grinstead Town (loan)		
2017	East Grinstead Town		
2017–2018	Harlow Town	17	(0)
2018–2020	Maldon & Tiptree	34	(2)
- * Club domestic league appearances and goals as of 19:34, 27 December 2023 (UTC)

James Frederick Alan Shepherd (born 23 December 1997) is an English professional footballer who plays as a defender.

== Club career ==
Shepherd was born in the London Borough of Newham, and grew up in nearby Hornchurch. He started his career with local side Dagenham & Redbridge in 2009, progressing through the youth system to sign a two-year scholarship in the summer of 2014. In January 2016, he was sent out on loan to Isthmian League Premier Division side East Thurrock United to gain experience in senior football. He made two appearances as a substitute during his one-month spell with the Rooks. In February 2016, he was sent out on loan again to Isthmian League Division One North side Barkingside along with fellow scholars Kai Heather, Darren Foxley and David Nicol-Wilson. He featured regularly as a starter for Barkingside as the team struggled near the bottom of the table, he returned to Dagenham in April having made eleven appearances. He made his debut for Dagenham on 30 April in a 3–0 home win over Crawley Town.

In August 2016, he signed for Southern League Premier Division side Hayes & Yeading United on a one-month loan deal. He was a regular starter during his loan spell making six appearances in all competitions during the month. In October 2016, he joined Southern Football League Division One Central side Egham Town on a one-month loan deal, where he went on to make eight first team appearances. In December 2016, he joined Isthmian League Premier Division side Billericay Town on a one-month loan deal. He went on to make four league appearances during the month. In February 2017, he was sent out on loan again signing a one-month loan with National League South side Whitehawk. He spent a month with the Hawks making a total of five appearances. In March 2017, he was sent out on loan for the fourth time of the season, joining Isthmian League Division One South side East Grinstead Town for a month. However, later in the month his contract with Dagenham was terminated and he remained with East Grinstead until the end of the season.

In July 2017, he signed for Isthmian League Premier Division side Harlow Town, where he went on to make 26 appearances in all competitions. In January 2018, he dropped down a division to sign for Isthmian League North Division Maldon & Tiptree.

== Career statistics ==
As of match played 19 April 2019

Appearances and goals by club, season and competition
Club	Season	League			FA Cup		League Cup		Other		Total	
Club	Season	Division	Apps	Goals	Apps	Goals	Apps	Goals	Apps	Goals	Apps	Goals
Dagenham & Redbridge	2015–16	League Two	2	0	0	0	0	0	0	0	2	0
Dagenham & Redbridge	2016–17	National League	2	0	—		—		0	0	2	0
Dagenham & Redbridge	Total		4	0	0	0	0	0	0	0	4	0
East Thurrock United (loan)	2015–16	IL Premier Division	2	0	—		—		—		2	0
Barkingside (loan)	2015–16	IL Division One North	11	0	—		—		—		11	0
Hayes & Yeading United (loan)	2016–17	SL Premier Division	5	0	1	0	—		—		6	0
Egham Town (loan)	2016–17	SL Division One Central	7	0	—		—		—		7	0
Billericay Town (loan)	2016–17	IL Premier Division	4	0	—		—		—		4	0
Whitehawk (loan)	2016–17	National League South	5	0	—		—		—		5	0
Harlow Town	2017–18	IL Premier Division	17	0	2	0	—		4 (Note: Appearances in FA Trophy)	0	23	0
Maldon & Tiptree	2017–18	IL North Division	15	2	—		—		—		15	2
Maldon & Tiptree	2018–19	IL North Division	19	0	1	0	—		2	0	22	0
Maldon & Tiptree	Total		34	2	1	0	—		2	0	37	2
Career total			89	2	4	0	0	0	6	0	99	2
