= Clévid Dikamona =

Footballer (born 1990)

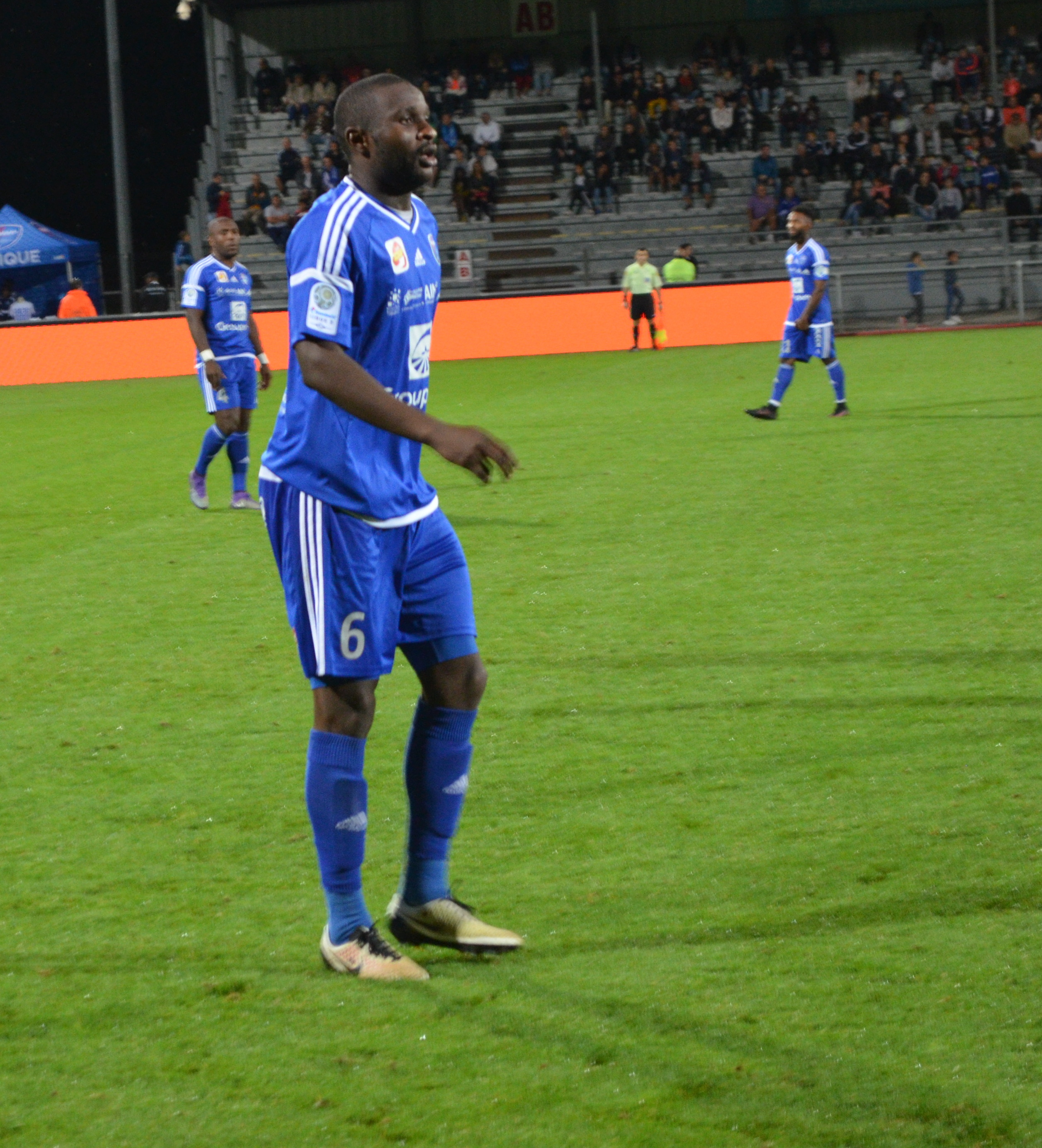
- Dikamona in 2016 with Bourg-Péronnas

Personal information
- Full name: Clévid Florian Dikamona
- Date of birth: 23 June 1990 (age 36)
- Place of birth: Caen, France
- Height: 1.87 m (6 ft 2 in)
- Position: Defender

Team information
- Current team: AG Caennaise

Youth career
- 1997–1999: Caen Nord
- 1999–2001: US Guérinière
- 2001–2008: Caen

Senior career*
Years	Team	Apps	(Gls)
2008–2010	Caen II	33	(1)
2010–2012	Le Havre II	26	(1)
2010–2013	Le Havre	9	(0)
2012–2013	→ Fréjus Saint-Raphaël (loan)	18	(0)
2013–2014	Sedan	19	(3)
2014–2015	Poiré-sur-Vie	18	(1)
2015	Poiré-sur-Vie II	3	(0)
2015–2016	Dagenham & Redbridge	27	(2)
2016–2017	Bourg-Péronnas	24	(1)
2017–2018	Platanias	23	(0)
2018	Bnei Sakhnin	0	(0)
2018–2020	Heart of Midlothian	32	(1)
2020–2021	Kilmarnock	12	(0)
2021-	AG Caennaise	6	(1)

International career^{‡}
2008–2009	France U19		
2016–	Congo	4	(0)
- * Club domestic league appearances and goals as of 18:01, 23 June 2022 (UTC) ‡ National team caps and goals as of 23:30, 14 February 2018 (UTC)

Clévid Florian Dikamona (born 23 June 1990) is a professional footballer who plays for AG Caennaise as a defender. Born in France, Dikamona represents Congo at international level.

== Club career ==
Born in Caen, Dikamona started his career in 1997 with local youth side Caen Nord, where he spent two years before the club folded due to financial reasons. He then moved on to US Guérinière where he spent a couple of years, also frequently playing against the youth teams of SM Caen. It was in one of these games that he was spotted by scout Gilles Deshors and invited to play for the SM Caen youth side, signing for the club in 2001. He progressed through the various youth sides and was promoted to the reserve side in 2008 at the age of eighteen. He spent two seasons playing for the reserve side but was not offered a professional contract with the club after a dispute with the owners.

He spent time on trial at Lille OSC and was offered a one-year contract, but signed for Ligue 2 side Le Havre AC after they offered him a three-year deal. In his first season with the club he drifted between the first team and reserve side, making his professional debut in February 2011 in a 1–0 win over Clermont Foot, replacing Mody Traoré as a substitute. In October 2011, he received a request to join Football League One side Sheffield Wednesday on trial. Sheffield Wednesday were keen on completing a deal, however a fee could not be agreed and Dikamona returned to France. In the winter break he returned to England with Football League Championship club Nottingham Forest on a one-week trial, however again a deal could not be agreed. On his return he spent the remainder of the season with the reserve side. The following season, he was close to signing for Championnat National side US Boulogne on loan but the clubs could not agree a split in wages. In November 2012 he joined Championnat National side Fréjus Saint-Raphaël on loan until the end of the season. He became a first team regular for the side that challenged for promotion to Ligue 2, but missed out on the final day to CA Bastia having only needed a point to secure promotion.

Following the completion of his loan Dikamona was released by Le Havre and became a free agent. He later signed for CFA 2 side CS Sedan Ardennes on a free transfer, who had recently been demoted from Ligue 2. He was a first team regular making nineteen appearances and scoring three goals as the side finished in second place, gaining promotion to the CFA. He had the option to stay for another season with Sedan, however, he moved up a division to Championnat National side Poiré-sur-Vie. He was a regular for the first half of the season but then picked up a thigh injury which ruled him out for the majority of the remaining campaign. At the end of the season Poiré-sur-Vie were demoted due to financial reasons and Dikamona chose to leave the club and went to train with the UNFP.

Due to his agent living in London, he earned himself a trial at League One side Oldham Athletic. A deal could again not be agreed and he joined Football League Two side Dagenham & Redbridge in August 2015 on trial for a friendly match against Crystal Palace. He impressed manager Wayne Burnett with his performance and signed a one-year contract with the option of a further year. He made his debut a week later in the 4–1 away defeat to Charlton Athletic in the Football League Cup. In May 2016 as his contract expired, he was released along with eleven players as Dagenham were relegated to the National League.

In July 2016, after spending a week on trial at the club, he signed for Ligue 2 side Bourg-Péronnas on a two-year contract. On 15 July 2017, Greek Super League club Platanias officially announced the signing of Dikamona on a two-year contract following his release from Bourg-Péronnas.

After a spell with Israeli club Bnei Sakhnin, Dikamona signed a one-year contract with Scottish Premiership club Heart of Midlothian in September 2018. He extended his contract by another year in March 2019. Dikamona left Hearts in March 2020 to return to France due to the COVID-19 pandemic. He returned to Scotland in August 2020, signing a one-year contract with Kilmarnock. He left Kilmarnock at the end of the 2020–21 season, returning to France with AG Caennaise.

== International career ==
On 1 March 2016 it was announced that he would be called up to represent Congo for the forthcoming matches against Zambia. This comes eight years after he was called up to represent the France U19 football team. He was called up to the Congo national football team for 2017 Africa Cup of Nations qualification against Zambia in March 2016. He made his debut for Congo in a 2-0 friendly loss to Morocco on 17 May 2016.

== Career statistics ==
=== Club ===
As of 20 February 2021

Appearances and goals by club, season and competition
Club	Season	League			National Cup		League Cup		Other		Total	
Club	Season	Division	Apps	Goals	Apps	Goals	Apps	Goals	Apps	Goals	Apps	Goals
Caen II	2008–09	CFA	18	1	—		—		—		18	1
Caen II	2009–10	CFA	15	0	—		—		—		15	0
Caen II	Total		33	1	—		—		—		33	1
Le Havre II	2010–11	CFA	11	0	—		—		—		11	0
Le Havre II	2011–12	CFA	14	1	—		—		—		14	1
Le Havre II	2012–13	CFA	1	0	—		—		—		1	0
Le Havre II	Total		36	1	—		—		—		36	1
Le Havre	2010–11	Ligue 2	7	0	0	0	0	0	—		7	0
Le Havre	2011–12	Ligue 2	2	0	0	0	0	0	—		2	0
Le Havre	Total		9	0	0	0	0	0	—		9	0
Fréjus Saint-Raphaël (loan)	2012–13	National	18	0	—		—		—		18	0
Sedan	2013–14	CFA 2	19	3	0	0	—		—		19	3
Poiré-sur-Vie	2014–15	National	15	1	1	2	—		—		16	3
Poiré-sur-Vie II	2014–15	CFA 2	3	0	—		—		—		3	0
Dagenham & Redbridge	2015–16	League Two	27	2	3	0	1	0	3 (Note: Appearances in Football League Trophy)	0	34	2
Bourg-Péronnas	2016–17	Ligue 2	24	1	0	0	1	0	—		25	1
Platanias	2017–18	Super League Greece	16	0	1	0	—		—		17	0
Heart of Midlothian	2018–19	Scottish Premiership	21	1	0	0	2	0	0	0	23	1
Heart of Midlothian	2019–20	Scottish Premiership	11	0	2	0	0	0	0	0	13	0
Kilmarnock	2020–21	Scottish Premiership	12	0	0	0	0	0	0	0	12	0
Career total			244	10	7	2	4	0	3	0	258	12

=== International ===
As of match played 5 September 2017.

Appearances and goals by national team and year
National team	Year	Apps	Goals
Congo	2016	2	0
Congo	2017	2	0
Total		4	0
