= Frankie Raymond =

English footballer (born 1992)

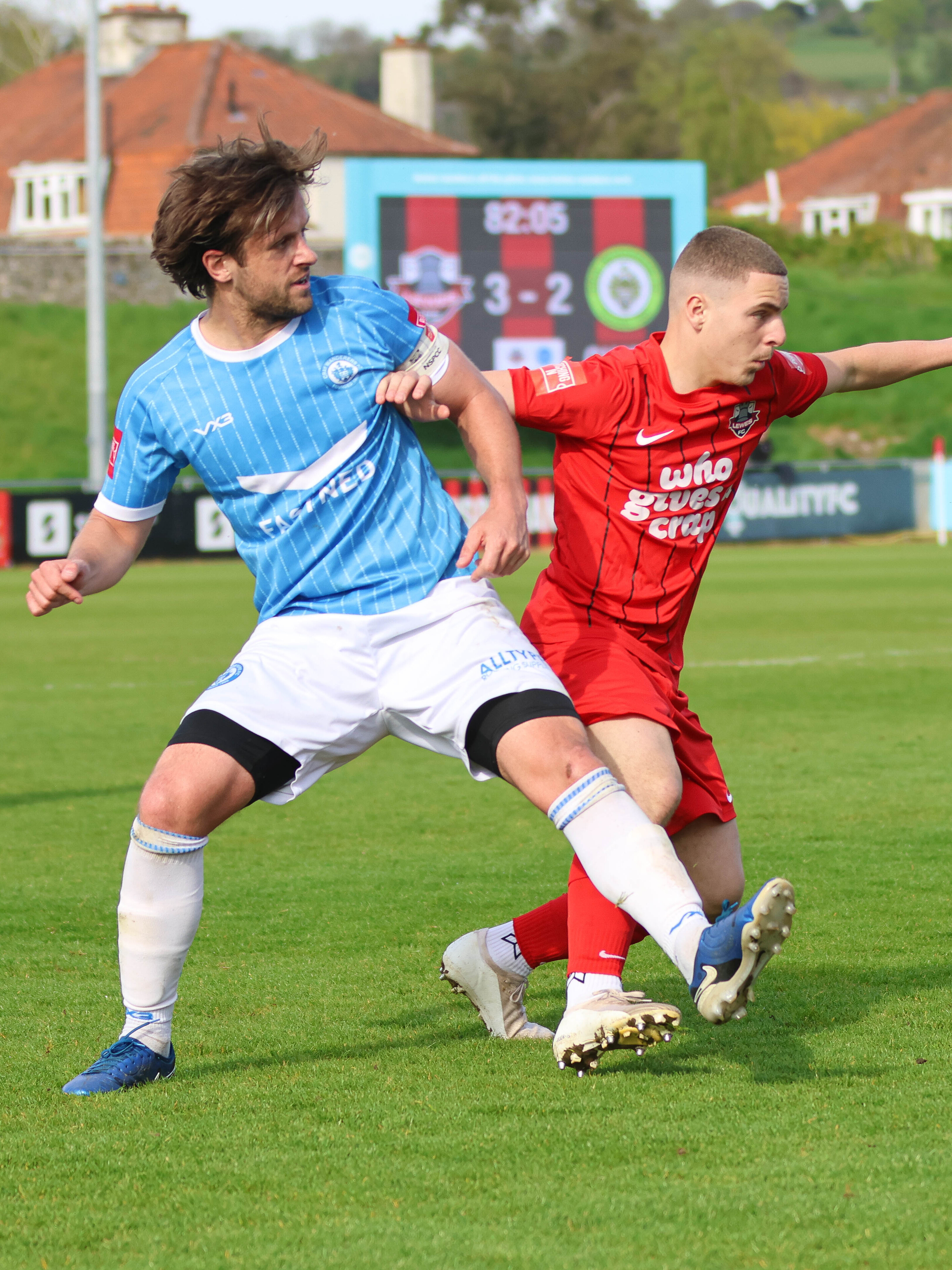
- Raymond (left) playing for Cray Wanderers in April 2025

Personal information
- Full name: Frankie John Raymond
- Date of birth: 18 November 1992 (age 33)
- Place of birth: Chislehurst, England
- Height: 1.78 m (5 ft 10 in)
- Position: Midfielder

Team information
- Current team: Cray Wanderers

Youth career
- –2010: Reading

Senior career*
Years	Team	Apps	(Gls)
2010–2012	Reading	0	(0)
2010–2011	→ Horsham (loan)	4	(0)
2011	→ Basingstoke Town (loan)	7	(0)
2011	→ Eastleigh (loan)	4	(0)
2011	→ Hungerford Town (loan)		
2012	Gillingham	0	(0)
2012–2014	Eastbourne Borough	63	(3)
2014–2017	Dagenham & Redbridge	48	(3)
2014–2015	→ Eastbourne Borough (loan)	15	(0)
2017–2021	Bromley	150	(9)
2021–2022	Boreham Wood	34	(1)
2022–2023	Dulwich Hamlet	38	(2)
2023–	Cray Wanderers	103	(9)
- * Club domestic league appearances and goals as of 21:15, 22 February 2026 (UTC)

Frankie John Raymond (born 18 November 1992) is an English footballer who plays as a midfielder for Cray Wanderers.

== Career ==
Raymond started his youth career at Wimbledon before joining Millwall. He then joined Reading's academy. In December 2010, he joined Isthmian League Premier Division side Horsham on loan, making his debut a month later in a 3–1 win over Kingstonian. He scored his only goal for the club in a 4–2 win over Hassocks in the Sussex Senior Cup, with a speculative effort from outside the box. He returned to Reading at the end of the month having made five appearances scoring once. In February 2011, he signed for Conference South side Basingstoke Town on loan until the end of the season, making seven appearances. In August 2011, he joined Conference South side Eastleigh on an initial one-month loan. In his fourth appearance for the club, he was sent off for an alleged headbutt against Tonbridge Angels and received a three-match ban. Prior to that incident, Eastleigh manager Ian Baird had looked into the opportunity of extending the loan until the end of the season, however his loan was cut short in September 2011. In October 2011, he joined Southern Football League Division One South & West side Hungerford Town on loan. In May 2012, he was released by Reading following the club's promotion to the Premier League.

In September 2012, he joined Football League Two side Gillingham on a non-contract basis and joined the club's development squad, having featured for the side in pre-season friendlies. His stay at the club was short-lived as he went on to sign for Conference South side Eastbourne Borough on a free transfer. He was a first team regular for Eastbourne during his two years at the club, as the side finished regularly in mid-table, making seventy appearances and scoring three goals. In July 2014, he signed for League Two side Dagenham & Redbridge for an undisclosed fee, signing a one-year contract with the option of a second year, having featured for the side in pre-season. He made his professional debut for the club in a 2–0 defeat to local rivals Leyton Orient in the Football League Trophy, replacing Abu Ogogo as a late substitute. In November 2014 after finding it difficult to break into the first team, he was loaned back to former Conference South club Eastbourne Borough on an initial one-month loan deal. In December 2014, his loan was extended for a further month, having made seven appearances during his loan spell. Then for a third consecutive month the deal was extended again for one more month. In May 2017 after three years at Dagenham, Raymond was released following the expiry of his contract.

Soon after, Raymond joined his local side Bromley.

On 1 July 2021, Raymond joined Boreham Wood on a two-year deal after four seasons with Bromley.

On 8 July 2022, Raymond joined National League South club Dulwich Hamlet. Following the club's relegation, he joined Isthmian League Premier Division club Cray Wanderers.

== Career statistics ==
As of 22 February 2026

Appearances and goals by club, season and competition
Club	Season	League			FA Cup		League Cup		Other		Total	
Club	Season	Division	Apps	Goals	Apps	Goals	Apps	Goals	Apps	Goals	Apps	Goals
Reading	2010–11	Championship	0	0	0	0	0	0	0	0	0	0
Reading	2011–12	Championship	0	0	0	0	0	0	—		0	0
Reading	Total		0	0	0	0	0	0	0	0	0	0
Horsham (loan)	2010–11	IL Premier Division	4	0	—		—		1 (Note: Appearance in Sussex Senior Cup)	0	5	0
Basingstoke Town (loan)	2010–11	Conference South	7	0	—		—		—		7	0
Eastleigh (loan)	2011–12	Conference South	4	0	—		—		—		4	0
Gillingham	2012–13	League Two	0	0	—		—		—		0	0
Eastbourne Borough	2012–13	Conference South	23	1	—		—		3 (Note: One appearance in FA Trophy, two in Sussex Senior Cup)	0	26	1
Eastbourne Borough	2013–14	Conference South	40	2	3	0	—		1 (Note: Appearance in FA Trophy)	0	44	2
Eastbourne Borough	Total		63	3	3	0	—		4	0	70	3
Dagenham & Redbridge	2014–15	League Two	2	1	0	0	0	0	1 (Note: Appearance in Football League Trophy)	0	3	1
Dagenham & Redbridge	2015–16	League Two	10	1	1	0	0	0	2	0	13	1
Dagenham & Redbridge	2016–17	National League	36	1	3	0	—		1	0	40	1
Dagenham & Redbridge	Total		48	3	4	0	0	0	4	0	56	3
Eastbourne Borough (loan)	2014–15	Conference South	15	0	—		—		3 (Note: One appearance in FA Trophy, two appearances and one goal in Sussex Senior Cup)	1	18	1
Bromley	2017–18	National League	38	2	3	0	—		8	1	49	3
Bromley	2018–19	National League	42	2	2	1	—		1	0	45	3
Bromley	2019–20	National League	35	5	3	0	—		1	0	39	5
Bromley	2020–21	National League	35	0	2	0	—		2	0	39	0
Bromley	Total		150	9	10	1	—		12	1	172	11
Boreham Wood	2021–22	National League	34	1	5	0	—		3	0	42	1
Dulwich Hamlet	2022–23	National League South	38	2	2	0	—		1	0	41	2
Cray Wanderers	2023–24	IL Premier Division	32	3	2	0	—		6 (Note: Three appearances and one goal in FA Trophy, one appearance in the Kent Senior Cup, two appearances in London Senior Cup)	1	40	4
Cray Wanderers	2024–25	Isthmian League Premier Division	41	5	6	1	—		1 (Note: One appearance in the FA Trophy)	0	48	6
Cray Wanderers	2025–26	Isthmian League Premier Division	30	1	1	1	—		0	0	31	2
Career total			466	27	27	3	0	0	34	3	534	33

== Honours ==
Bromley

- FA Trophy runner-up: 2017–18
