= Grays Athletic F.C. =

Association football club in England

Coordinates: 51.5035°N 0.2613°E

Grays Athletic
- Full name: Grays Athletic Football Club
- Nicknames: The Gravelmen, The Ath, The Blues
- Founded: 1890
- Ground: Chadfields, Tilbury
- Capacity: 4,000 (350 seated)
- Chairman: Lee Vehit
- Manager: Lewis Clark (player-manager)
- League: Isthmian League North Division
- 2025–26: Isthmian League North Division, 18th of 22
- Website: graysathletic.co.uk
Home colours	Away colours

Grays Athletic Football Club is a football club based in Grays, Essex, England. It is currently a member of the Isthmian League North Division. The team play at Chadfields in nearby Tilbury.

== History ==
The club was established as Grays Juniors in 1890, before merging with former Southern League club Grays United to form Grays Athletic. The newly formed club joined the Grays & District League, later joining Division Two B of the South Essex League in 1908. It was runner-up in its first season in the division and won it in its second season, earning promotion to Division One for the 1909–10 season. The club was a founder member of the Athenian League in 1912, but that league closed down in 1914 due to the First World War, and Grays transferred to the Premier Division (Amateur) of the London League. They won the division in their first season, with the reserves also winning Division One. The league was suspended at the end of the 1914–15 season, with Grays rejoining in the Premier Division when it restarted in 1919–20.

Grays were Premier Division runners-up in 1920–21, before winning the division in 1921–22. In 1924 the club joined the Kent League but after two seasons in mid-table, they returned to the London League in 1926. The return was a success as the club were Premier Division champions in 1926–27 and runners-up in the next two seasons, before winning the title again in 1929–30. After finishing as runners-up in 1930–31, the club spent most of the 1930s in mid-table, although they won the league's Challenge Cup in 1936–37.

After the Second World War, Grays was a founder member of the Corinthian League, and was that league's inaugural champion and League Cup winner in 1945–46. They were league runners-up in 1951–52, and the following season saw them qualify for the first round of the FA Cup for the first time, losing 5–0 at home to Llanelli. They were league runners-up again in 1954–55 and 1956–57, before rejoining the Athenian League in 1958. When the league gained two more divisions in 1963, the club were placed in the Premier Division, where they remained until being relegated to Division One at the end of the 1971–72 season, in which they had finished bottom of the table. In 1977 the league was reorganised into a single division, and the club were runners-up in 1982–83.

In 1983 Grays transferred to Division Two of the Isthmian League. League reorganisation saw them placed in Division Two South in 1984 and they went on to win the division at the first attempt, earning promotion to Division One. In 1987–88 they were Division One runners-up, resulting in promotion to the Premier Division. In 1988–89 the club reached the first round of the FA Cup for a second time, losing 2–0 at Bath City. They remained in the Premier Division until being relegated back to Division One at the end of the 1996–97 season. In 1999–2000 the club were Division One runners-up, earning promotion back to the Premier Division. In 2000–01 another appearance in the FA Cup first round saw them play Football League opposition for the first time, losing 4–0 at Reading.

A sixth-place finish in 2003–04 resulted in Grays being placed in the new Conference South for the 2004–05 season. They went on to win the new division in its first season, earning promotion to the Conference National. The season also saw them reach the final of the FA Trophy, in which they beat Hucknall Town 6–5 on penalties after a 1–1 draw at Villa Park. In their first season in the Conference National the club finished third, qualifying for the promotion play-offs. However, they lost 5–4 on aggregate to Halifax Town. They also reached the second round of the FA Cup, beating York City 3–0 at Bootham Crescent before losing 3–0 at Mansfield Town, as well as retaining the FA Trophy with a 2–0 win over Woking in the final. The club's league form subsequently faded and after narrowly avoiding relegation in 2006–07 and 2008–09, they finished bottom of the Conference National in 2009–10 and resigned from the Football Conference.

Grays were initially rejected by the Isthmian League and were lined up to play in the Essex Senior League. However, an appeal to the Football Association saw them placed in Division One North of the Isthmian League. A fifth-place finish in 2011–12 saw them qualify for the play-offs, in which Enfield Town defeated them 3–1 on penalties after a 2–2 draw in the semi-final. However, the club were Division One North champions the following season with a club record 102 points, earning promotion back to the Premier Division. In August 2016 the club became community-owned. They went on to finish bottom of the Premier Division in the 2016–17 and were relegated back to the (renamed) North Division. In 2022–23 the club finished fifth in the North Division, qualifying for the promotion play-offs, in which they lost 3–2 to AFC Sudbury in the semi-finals.

=== Season-by-season ===
Season	Division	Position	Top league goalscorer	Notes
2003–04	Isthmian League Premier Division	6/24	Freddy Eastwood, 28	
2004–05	Conference South	1/22	Leroy Griffiths, 19	Champions, promoted
2005–06	Conference National	3/22	Michael Kightly, 15	
2006–07	Conference National	19/24	Aaron McLean, 13	
2007–08	Conference National	10/24	Danny Kedwell, 13	
2008–09	Conference National	19/24	Andy Pugh, 7	
2009–10	Conference National	23/23	Jamie Slabber, 4	Relegated
2010–11	Isthmian League Division One North	10/21	Alex Osborn, 17	
2011–12	Isthmian League Division One North	5/22	Joao Carlos, 10	Lost in the play-off semi-finals
2012–13	Isthmian League Division One North	1/22	Jack West, 17	Champions, promoted
2013–14	Isthmian League Premier Division	14/24	Joao Carlos, 20	
2014–15	Isthmian League Premier Division	6/24	Freddie Ladapo, 14	
2015–16	Isthmian League Premier Division	15/24	Dumebi Dumaka, 19	
2016–17	Isthmian League Premier Division	24/24	Kieran Bishop, 12	Relegated
2017–18	Isthmian League North Division	16/24	Kieran Bishop, 24	
2018–19	Isthmian League North Division	7/20	Mitch Hahn, 9	
2019–20	Isthmian League North Division	—	Joao Carlos, 14	Season abandoned due to COVID-19 pandemic
2020–21	Isthmian League North Division	—	Joseph Agunbiade, 2	Season abandoned due to COVID-19 pandemic
2021–22	Isthmian League North Division	6/20	Anointed Chukwu, 16	
2022–23	Isthmian League North Division	5/20	Sam Bantick, 19	Lost in the play-off semi-finals
2023–24	Isthmian League North Division	16/20	Charlie Stimson, 15	
2024–25	Isthmian League North Division	9/22	Alejandro Machado, 12	
2025-26	Isthmian League North Division	18/22	Oscar Shelvey - 5	

== Ground ==
The club initially played at the Hoppit Ground in Little Thurrock. In 1906 they moved to the New Recreation Ground, playing there until 2010. After the ground was sold to developers, the club groundshared with East Thurrock United at their Rookery Hill ground in Corringham.

During the 2012–13 season the club played at Rush Green Stadium in Rush Green, sharing the ground with West Ham United's reserves who played in the Professional Development League. The following season, West Ham pulled out of the deal in June and Grays moved to Aveley's Mill Field ground. When Aveley moved to Parkside in 2017, Grays became tenants at the new ground. In February 2023 Grays announced the club would be groundsharing at Tilbury for the 2023–24 season.

In 2024 the club obtained ownership of Ship Lane, the former home of Thurrock, stating they hoped to be playing at the new ground in the 2025–26 season. However, they have since revised their target to the 2026–27 season, and talks are currently on-going to extend their groundshare agreement with Tilbury FC.

== Honours ==
- FA Trophy
  - Winners 2004–05, 2005–06
- Football Conference
  - Conference South champions 2004–05
- Isthmian League
  - Division Two South champions 1984–85
  - Division One North champions 2012–13
  - League Cup winners: 1991–92
- London League
  - Premier Division champions 1921–22, 1926–27, 1929–30
  - Premier Division (Amateur) champions 1914–15
  - Challenge Cup winners 1936–37
- Corinthian League
  - Champions 1945–46
  - League Cup winners 1945–46
- South Essex League
  - Division Two B champions 1908–09
- Essex Senior Cup
  - Winners 1914–15, 1920–21, 1922–23, 1944–45, 1956–57, 1987–88, 1993–94, 1994–95
- Essex Thameside Trophy
  - Winners 1947–48, 1978–79, 1980–81, 1987–88, 1988–89, 1990–91, 2001–02
- East Anglian Cup
  - Winners 1944–45

== Records ==
- Best FA Cup performance: Second round, 2005–06
- Best FA Trophy performance: Winners, 2004–05, 2005–06
- Best FA Vase performance: Fourth round, 1977–78, 1979–80, 1981–82, 1983–84
- Biggest victory: 12–0 vs Tooting Town, London League, 24 February 1923
- Biggest defeat: 0–12 vs Enfield, Athenian League, 20 April 1963
- Attendance: 9,500 v Chelmsford City, FA Cup fourth qualifying round, 1959
- Most appearances: Phil Sammons, 673 (1982–1997)
- Most goals: Harry Brand, 269 (1944–1952)
- Transfer record fee paid: £12,000 to Welling United for Danny Kedwell
- Transfer record fee received: £150,000 from Peterborough United for Aaron McLean

== See also ==
- Grays Athletic F.C. players
- Grays Athletic F.C. managers
