= Jack Connors (footballer, born 1994) =

Irish footballer

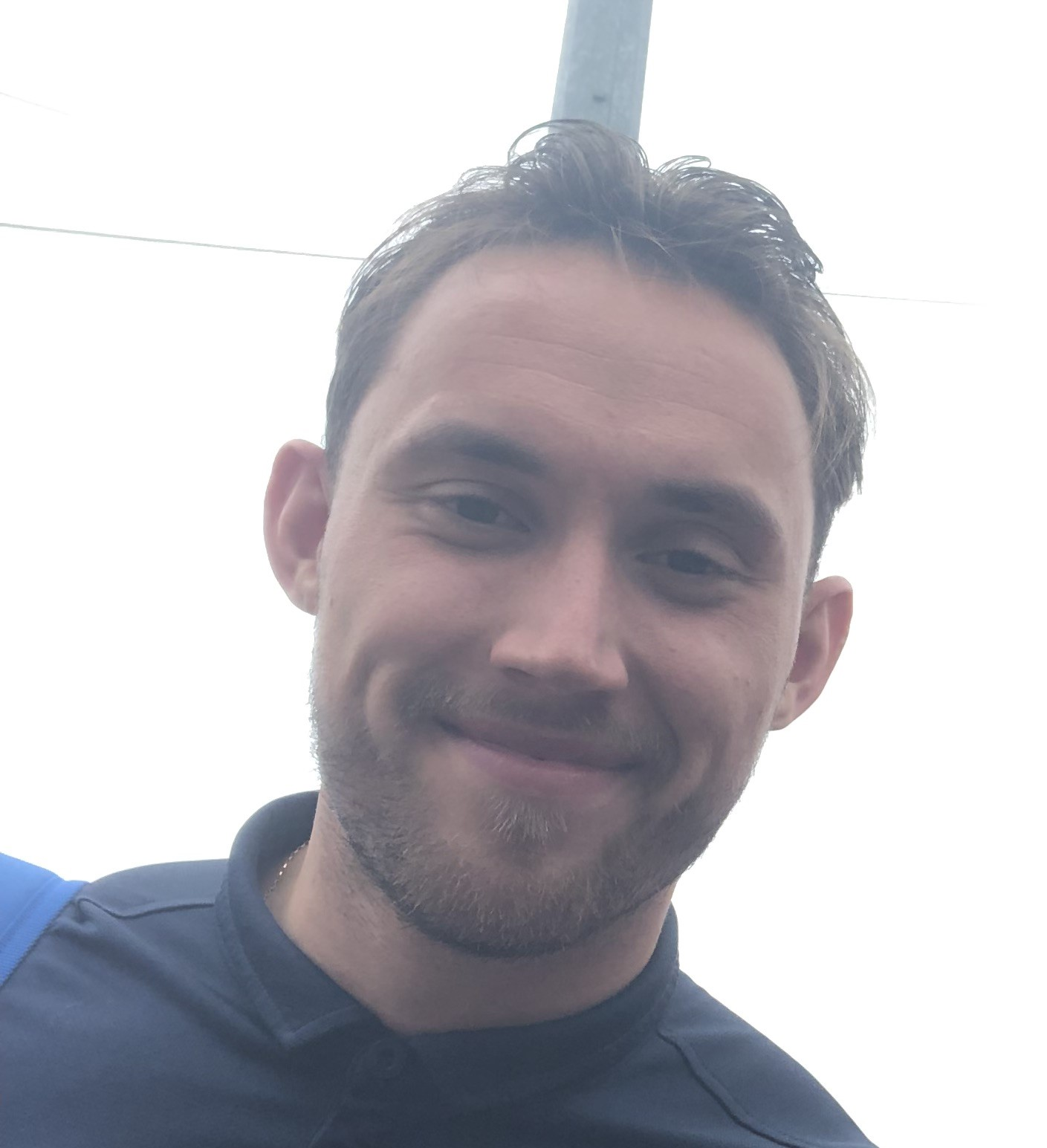
- Connors in 2024.

Personal information
- Full name: Jack Stuart Connors
- Date of birth: 24 October 1994 (age 32)
- Place of birth: Brent, England
- Height: 1.73 m (5 ft 8 in)
- Position: Defender

Team information
- Current team: Chesham United

Youth career
- 2011–2013: Dagenham & Redbridge

Senior career*
Years	Team	Apps	(Gls)
2012–2016	Dagenham & Redbridge	49	(0)
2012–2013	→ Hendon (loan)	17	(2)
2016	→ Boreham Wood (loan)	1	(0)
2016–2018	Ebbsfleet United	62	(1)
2018–2019	Dover Athletic	10	(0)
2018–2019	→ Hampton & Richmond Borough (loan)	24	(2)
2019–2020	Dulwich Hamlet	23	(1)
2020–2021	Barnet	6	(0)
2021–2022	Hayes & Yeading United	25	(0)
2022–	Chesham United	65	(0)

International career^{‡}
2014–2016	Republic of Ireland U21	15	(0)
- * Club domestic league appearances and goals as of 11:26, 17 September 2025 (UTC) ‡ National team caps and goals as of 21:00, 24 March 2016 (UTC)

Jack Stuart Connors (born 24 October 1994) is an Irish footballer who plays as a defender for Chesham United.

Connors started his career in the youth system of Fulham before joining Dagenham & Redbridge in 2011 to sign a two-year scholarship. In 2012, he joined Isthmian League Premier Division side Hendon on work experience. After completing his scholarship, he signed a professional contract with Dagenham & Redbridge in 2013.

Connors has represented the Republic of Ireland at international level, featuring for the under-21 side.

== Career ==
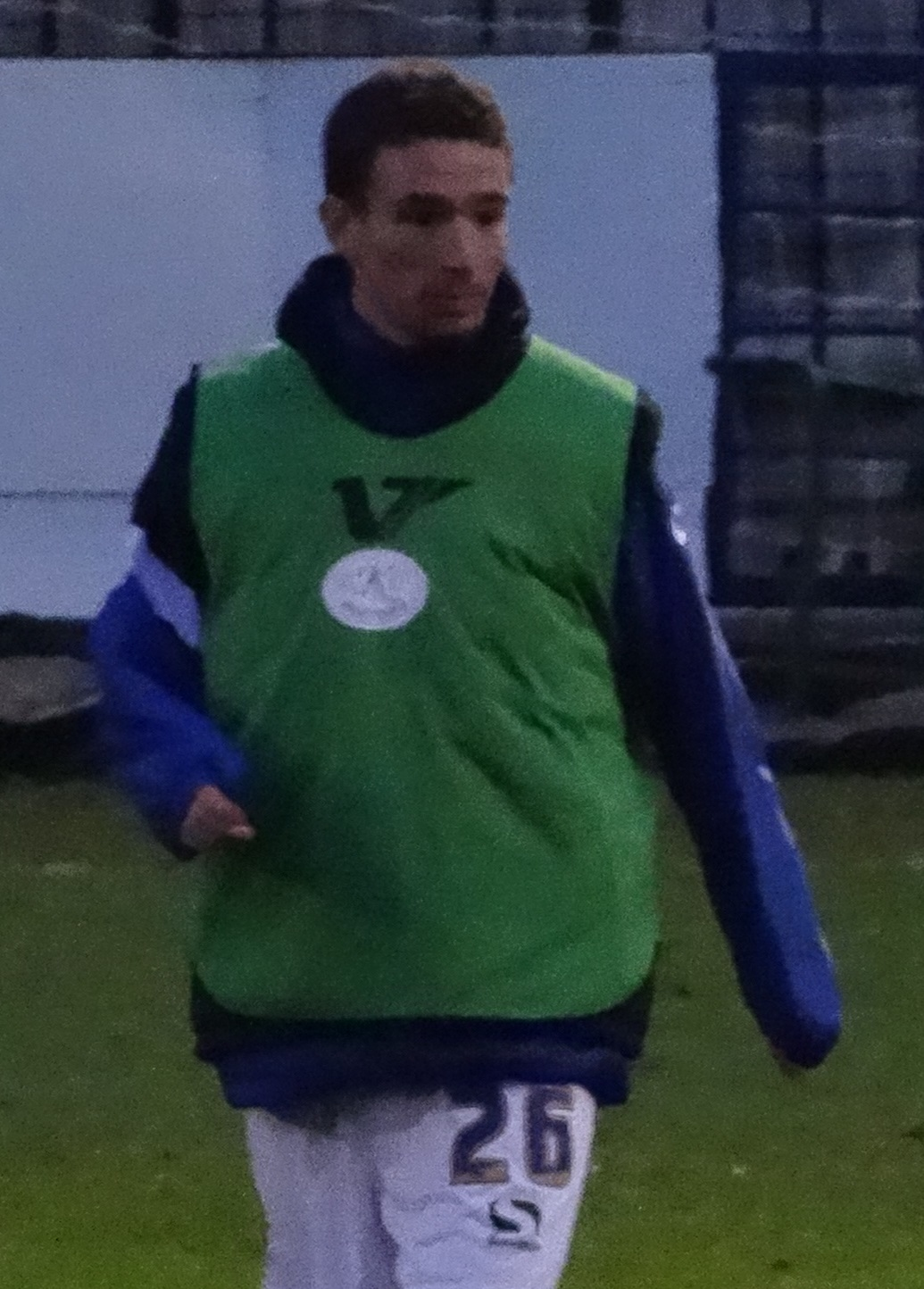
Connors training with Dagenham & Redbridge in 2014.

Born in the London Borough of Brent, Connors joined the youth system of Dagenham & Redbridge in 2011 on a two-year scholarship, having previously played for Fulham. In December 2012, Connors joined Isthmian League Premier Division side Hendon on work experience. His debut for the Greens came on 8 January 2013 in a 2–1 home defeat to Canvey Island. His first goal for Hendon came in his second appearance when he scored the winner in a 1–0 win against Kingstonian. His second goal for Hendon came in a 1–0 win over Leiston. His final game for Hendon was in the final game of the season, a 1–0 away defeat to Lowestoft Town. In total, Connors made 19 appearances for Hendon scoring two goals. In July 2013, after he completed his scholarship, Connors signed a one-year professional contract with the Football League Two side after impressing manager Wayne Burnett. His professional debut for the Daggers came on 3 September 2013, in a 4–1 victory over Colchester United in the Football League Trophy first round at Victoria Road. Four days later, Connors made his league debut in a 1–1 draw with Exeter City. After an extended result in the Dagger's first team playing as left back, Connors signed a new three-year contract with the club on 31 October 2013. Connors went on to make 25 appearances in his maiden season, winning the Young Player of the Year award. In March 2016, after struggling to gain a place in the first team line-up, he was sent on loan to National League side Boreham Wood on loan until the end of the season. In May 2016 as his contract expired, he was released along with eleven players as Dagenham were relegated to the National League.

In the summer of 2016, Connors signed for Ebbsfleet United and helped them to earn promotion from the National League South. In April 2018, he scored his first and only goal for Ebbsfleet in a 1–1 draw against Torquay United.

Connors joined Dover Athletic in July 2018 after his release by Ebbsfleet. He spent most of the season out on loan with Hampton & Richmond Borough.

In June 2019, Connors agreed to join Dulwich Hamlet on expiry of his contract with Dover.

Connors signed for Barnet in October 2020 after a successful trial. He left the club at the end of the season.

Connors joined Hayes & Yeading United in September 2021.

== International career ==
Connors qualifies to play for the Republic of Ireland through his father. In May 2014, Connors received his first call-up to the under-21 side for the international friendly with Qatar in Aachen, Germany. He made his debut in that match, playing the first half in a 1–1 draw. He made his competitive debut in September 2014, in the 2015 UEFA European Under-21 Championship qualification match against Germany, which ended in a 2–0 defeat.

== Career statistics ==
As of match played 19 March 2022

Appearances and goals by club, season and competition
Club	Season	League			FA Cup		League Cup		Other		Total	
Club	Season	Division	Apps	Goals	Apps	Goals	Apps	Goals	Apps	Goals	Apps	Goals
Dagenham & Redbridge	2012–13	League Two	0	0	0	0	0	0	0	0	0	0
Dagenham & Redbridge	2013–14	League Two	23	0	1	0	0	0	1 (Note: Appearances in Football League Trophy)	0	25	0
Dagenham & Redbridge	2014–15	League Two	17	0	0	0	1	0	0	0	18	0
Dagenham & Redbridge	2015–16	League Two	9	0	3	0	0	0	1	0	13	0
Dagenham & Redbridge	Total		49	0	4	0	1	0	2	0	56	0
Hendon (loan)	2012–13	IL Premier Division	17	2	—		—		2 (Note: Appearances in London Senior Cup)	0	19	2
Boreham Wood (loan)	2015–16	National League	1	0	—		—		—		1	0
Ebbsfleet United	2016–17	National League South	38	0	2	0	—		6 (Note: Three appearances in FA Trophy, three in National League South play-offs)	0	46	0
Ebbsfleet United	2017–18	National League	24	1	2	0	—		5 (Note: Three appearances in FA Trophy, two in National League play-offs)	0	31	1
Ebbsfleet United	Total		62	1	4	0	—		11	0	77	1
Dover Athletic	2018–19	National League	10	0	—		—		—		10	0
Hampton & Richmond Borough (loan)	2018–19	National League South	24	2	1	0	—		1 (Note: Appearance in FA Trophy)	0	26	2
Dulwich Hamlet	2019–20	National League South	23	1	3	0	—		3 (Note: Two appearances in FA Trophy, one appearance in London Senior Cup)	0	29	1
Barnet	2020–21	National League	6	0	1	0	—		1	0	8	0
Hayes & Yeading United	2021–22	SFL Premier Division South	19	0	3	0	—		3 (Note: One appearance in FA Trophy, one appearance in Southern Football League Cup, one in Middlesex Senior Cup)	0	25	0
Career total			211	6	16	0	1	0	23	0	251	6
