= 2011–12 Barnet F.C. season =

Barnet F.C.
2011–12 season
- Chairman: Anthony Kleanthous
- Manager: Lawrie Sanchez (sacked 16 April 2012); Martin Allen
- League Two: 22nd
- FA Cup: 2nd round
- League Cup: 2nd round
- Football League Trophy: Area Final (South)
- Top goalscorer: League: Izale McLeod (17); All: Izale McLeod (21)
- Highest home attendance: League: 4,422 vs AFC Wimbledon (28 Apr 2012); All: 4,422 vs AFC Wimbledon (28 Apr 2012)
- Lowest home attendance: League: 1,509 vs Bradford City (28 Feb 2012); All: 1,509 vs Bradford City (28 Feb 2012)
- Average home league attendance: League: 2,266
Home colours	Away colours

The 2011–12 season is Barnet's 124th year in existence. Along with competing in League Two, the club also participated in the FA Cup, EFL Cup and EFL Trophy.

== League table ==
Pos	Team	Pld	W	D	L	GF	GA	GD	Pts	Promotion, qualification or relegation
20	Northampton Town	46	12	12	22	56	79	−23	48	
21	Plymouth Argyle	46	10	16	20	47	64	−17	46	
22	Barnet	46	12	10	24	52	79	−27	46	
23	Hereford United (R)	46	10	14	22	50	70	−20	44	Relegation to the Conference Premier
24	Macclesfield Town (R)	46	8	13	25	39	64	−25	37	Relegation to the Conference Premier

Updated to match(es) played on 5 May 2012. Source: BBC Sport
Rules for classification: 1) Points; 2) Goal difference; 3) Number of goals scored
(R) Relegated

== Results ==
=== Pre-season friendlies ===
16 July 2011	Barnet	2–2	Peterborough United	Underhill Stadium
15:00	McLeod 1'; Holmes 15'		Frecklington 29'; Tomlin 48'	Attendance: 531

20 July 2011	Barnet	1–0	Gabala	Underhill Stadium
19:45	McLeod 16'			Attendance: 417

23 July 2011	Barnet	3–2	Tottenham Hotspur XI	Underhill Stadium
15:00	Marshall 2'; McLeod 23' (pen.); Byrne 24'		Kane 49' (pen.); Obika 63'	Attendance: 1,582; Referee: Mark Halsey

26 July 2011	Chesham United	4–0	Barnet	The Meadow
19:45	Thomas 15' (pen.), 50'; Potton 45'; Archer 46'			Attendance: 243

27 July 2011	Sutton United	2–4	Barnet	Gander Green Lane
19:45	Riviere 6'; Griffiths 79'		Deering 60', 90'; Kamdjo 75'; Price 89'	Attendance: 305

30 July 2011	Barnet	1–1	Milton Keynes Dons	Underhill Stadium
15:00	McLeod 87'		Gleeson 21'	Attendance: 569

=== League Two ===
6 August 2011	Morecambe	0–1	Barnet	Globe Arena
15:00			Byrne 76'	Attendance: 1,874; Referee: Andrew Madley

13 August 2011	Barnet	1–3	Port Vale	Underhill Stadium
15:00	Price 63'		Rigg 27', 57'; Roberts 37'	Attendance: 2,260; Referee: Fred Graham

16 August 2011	Barnet	2–2	Gillingham	Underhill Stadium
19:45	McLeod 61', 90+4'		Spiller 6'; J. Payne 73'	Attendance: 2,466; Referee: James Linington

20 August 2011	Rotherham United	2–2	Barnet	Don Valley Stadium
15:00	Brown 49'; Le Fondre 82'		Kamdjo 36'; McLeod 63' (pen.)	Attendance: 3,546; Referee: David Coote

27 August 2011	Bradford City	4–2	Barnet	Valley Parade
15:00	Hanson 16', 54'; Branston 49'; Wells 90'		McLeod 15', 90+3'	Attendance: 9,656; Referee: Gary Sutton

3 September 2011	Barnet	0–0	Accrington Stanley	Underhill Stadium
15:00				Attendance: 2,380; Referee: Lee Collins

10 September 2011	Crewe Alexandra	3–1	Barnet	Alexandra Stadium
15:00	Murphy 27'; Miller 55'; Dugdale 90+1'		McLeod 81'	Attendance: 3,142; Referee: James Adcock

13 September 2011	Barnet	2–0	Plymouth Argyle	Underhill Stadium
19:45	McLeod 7'; Leach 64'			Attendance: 1,849; Referee: Mark Brown

17 September 2011	Barnet	0–2	Oxford United	Underhill Stadium
15:00			Heslop 33'; Davis 38'	Attendance: 2,812; Referee: Carl Berry

24 September 2011	Swindon Town	4–0	Barnet	The County Ground
15:00	De Vita 11'; Ritchie 22', 65'; Kerrouche 45+3'			Attendance: 7,279; Referee: Phil Gibbs

1 October 2011	Barnet	1–2	Northampton Town	Underhill Stadium
15:00	Holmes 17'		Davies 61'; Tozer 89'	Attendance: 2,304; Referee: Andy D'Urso

8 October 2011	Shrewsbury Town	3–2	Barnet	Greenhous Meadow
15:00	Richards 31'; Gornell 42'; Ainsworth 90+3'		Holmes 69'; Marshall 82'	Attendance: 5,192; Referee: Bobby Madley

15 October 2011	Barnet	2–1	Aldershot Town	Underhill Stadium
15:00	Kabba 63' (pen.); Holmes 79'		Hylton 27'	Attendance: 2,015; Referee: Robert Lewis

22 October 2011	Hereford United	1–0	Barnet	Edgar Street
15:00	Elder 66'			Attendance: 2,124; Referee: Mark Heywood

25 October 2011	Barnet	0–3	Southend United	Underhill Stadium
19:45			Hall 17'; Mohsni 36'; Harris 85'	Attendance: 2,744; Referee: Andy Woolmer

29 October 2011	Barnet	3–6	Burton Albion	Underhill Stadium
15:00	McLeod 39'; Holmes 55'; Deering 88'		Kee 7', 31', 62'; Yussuf 74'; Dyer 84'; Zola 90+4'	Attendance: 1,745; Referee: Gavin Ward

5 November 2011	AFC Wimbledon	1–1	Barnet	The Cherry Red Records Stadium
15:00	S. Moore 63'		McLeod 45+2'	Attendance: 4,369; Referee: Jonathan Moss

19 November 2011	Bristol Rovers	0–2	Barnet	Memorial Stadium
15:00			McLeod 19'; Byrne 90+8'	Attendance: 5,024; Referee: Steve Rushton

25 November 2011	Barnet	2–1	Macclesfield Town	Underhill Stadium
19:45	McLeod 41' (pen.), 45' (pen.)		Hamshaw 61'	Attendance: 2,200; Referee: Dean Whitestone

9 December 2011	Torquay United	1–0	Barnet	Plainmoor
19:45	Nicholson 90+4'			Attendance: 2,125; Referee: Dave Phillips

16 December 2011	Barnet	2–2	Cheltenham Town	Underhill Stadium
19:45	McLeod 41', 60' (pen.)		Mohamed 32'; Duffy 44' (pen.)	Attendance: 1,775; Referee: Simon Hooper

26 December 2011	Dagenham & Redbridge	3–0	Barnet	London Borough of Barking & Dagenham Stadium
13:00	Montano 14', 45'; Woodall 63'			Attendance: 2,135; Referee: Keith Stroud

30 December 2011	Crawley Town	1–0	Barnet	Broadfield Stadium
19:45	Barnett 3'			Attendance: 3,008; Referee: Carl Berry

2 January 2012	Barnet	2–0	Bristol Rovers	Underhill Stadium
15:00	McLeod 69'; Kamdjo 80'			Attendance: 2,537; Referee: Lee Collins

14 January 2012	Accrington Stanley	0–3	Barnet	Fraser Eagle Stadium
15:00			Holmes 23'; Hughes 45+1'; Deering 54'	Attendance: 1,652; Referee: Andy Haines

21 January 2012	Northampton Town	1–2	Barnet	Sixfields Stadium
15:00	Akinfenwa 10'		Byrne 48'; Holmes 69'	Attendance: 4,561; Referee: Jock Waugh

28 January 2012	Barnet	2–0	Crewe Alexandra	Underhill Stadium
15:00	McLeod 30' (pen.); Hector 77'			Attendance: 2,263; Referee: Darren Sheldrake

14 February 2012	Plymouth Argyle	0–0	Barnet	Home Park
19:45				Attendance: 5,879; Referee: Brendan Malone

18 February 2012	Barnet	1–2	Shrewsbury Town	Underhill Stadium
15:00	McLeod 48'		Kamdjo 45+1' (o.g.); Collins 74'	Attendance: 2,046; Referee: Mark Hayward

21 February 2012	Oxford United	2–1	Barnet	Kassam Stadium
19:45	Rendell 43'; Constable 56'		Hector 16'	Attendance: 5,848; Referee: Stuart Attwell

25 February 2012	Aldershot Town	4–1	Barnet	The EBB Stadium at the Recreation Ground
15:00	Madjo 6', 51'; Hylton 17'; Brown 30'		Taylor 58'	Attendance: 2,511; Referee: Fred Graham

28 February 2012	Barnet	0–4	Bradford City	Underhill Stadium
19:45			Fagan 17' (pen.); Atkinson 37'; Reid 58'; Wells 88'	Attendance: 1,509; Referee: Roger East

3 March 2012	Barnet	1–1	Rotherham United	Underhill Stadium
15:00	Byrne 7'		Pringle 50'	Attendance: 1,765; Referee: Graham Scott

6 March 2012	Gillingham	3–1	Barnet	MEMS Priestfield Stadium
19:45	Oli 47'; Obita 76'; C. Lee 87'		Kamdjo 39'	Attendance: 3,751; Referee: Carl Berry

10 March 2012	Port Vale	1–2	Barnet	Vale Park
15:00	Richards 56'		May 66'; Yiadom 89'	Attendance: 5,522; Referee: Geoff Eltringham

17 March 2012	Barnet	0–2	Morecambe	Underhill Stadium
15:00			Ellison 42'; Redshaw 63'	Attendance: 1,536; Referee: Danny McDermid

20 March 2012	Barnet	2–2	Dagenham & Redbridge	Underhill Stadium
19:45	McLeod 30'; May 79'		Spillane 25'; Doe 72'	Attendance: 1,725; Referee: Pat Miller

23 March 2012	Macclesfield Town	0–0	Barnet	Moss Rose
19:45				Attendance: 2,123; Referee: David Coote

30 March 2012	Barnet	0–1	Torquay United	Underhill Stadium
20:00			Stevens 49'	Attendance: 2,263; Referee: Fred Graham

3 April 2012	Barnet	0–2	Swindon Town	Underhill Stadium
19:45			Murray 13'; Risser 31'	Attendance: 2,211; Referee: James Adcock

6 April 2012	Cheltenham Town	2–0	Barnet	Abbey Business Stadium
15:00	Mohamed 75'; Spencer 88'			Attendance: 3,319; Referee: Mark Heywood

9 April 2012	Barnet	1–2	Crawley Town	Underhill Stadium
15:00	Holmes 15'		Dempster 52'; Davies 62'	Attendance: 2,099; Referee: Andy Haines

13 April 2012	Barnet	1–1	Hereford United	Underhill Stadium
19:45	May 31'		Facey 11'	Attendance: 3,189; Referee: Chris Sarginson

20 April 2012	Southend United	3–0	Barnet	Roots Hall
19:45	Mohsni 11', 25', 32'			Attendance: 6,451; Referee: Graham Scott

28 April 2012	Barnet	4–0	AFC Wimbledon	Underhill Stadium
15:00	Holmes 33'; Deering 81'; May 86'; Hughes 90+2'			Attendance: 4,422; Referee: Gary Sutton

5 May 2012	Burton Albion	1–2	Barnet	Pirelli Stadium
15:00	Maghoma 27'		Byrne 6'; Hughes 60'	Attendance: 3,359; Referee: Nigel Miller

=== FA Cup ===
12 November 2011 1st Round	Southport	1–2	Barnet	Haig Avenue
15:00	Akrigg 71'		Kamdjo 59'; Taylor 90+3'	Attendance: 1,939; Referee: Bobby Madley

3 December 2011 2nd Round	Barnet	1–3	Milton Keynes Dons	Underhill Stadium
15:00	McLeod 87'		Potter 39'; MacDonald 78'; Powell 88'	Attendance: 2,608; Referee: Rob Lewis

=== League Cup ===
9 August 2011 1st Round	Portsmouth	0–1	Barnet	Fratton Park
19:45			Hughes 30'	Attendance: 4,464; Referee: Darren Sheldrake

23 August 2011 2nd Round	Burnley	3–2 (a.e.t.)	Barnet	Turf Moor
19:45	Rodriguez 38'; Elliott 64'; McCann 105'		Kabba 73'; Holmes 90+3'	Attendance: 4,273; Referee: Chris Sarginson

=== Football League Trophy ===
30 August 2011 1st Round	Colchester United	1–3	Barnet	Weston Homes Community Stadium
19:30	Baldwin 16'		Holmes 7'; McLeod 19' (pen.); Kabba 74'	Attendance: 1,747; Referee: David Phillips

4 October 2011 2nd Round	Gillingham	1–3	Barnet	MEMS Priestfield Stadium
19:00	Richards 5'		McLeod 11' (pen.), 84'; Marshall 72'	Attendance: 1,278; Referee: Graham Scott

8 November 2011 Area Qtr Final	Cheltenham Town	0–2	Barnet	Abbey Business Stadium
19:45			Marshall 44'; Taylor 68'	Attendance: 1,388; Referee: Darren Drysdale

6 December 2011 Area Semi	Barnet	0–0 (5–3 p)	Brentford	Underhill Stadium
19:45				Attendance: 1,970; Referee: Oliver Langford
	Penalties
	Hughes (penalty scored); Holmes (penalty scored); Deering (penalty scored); McLeod (penalty scored); Senda (penalty scored)		(penalty scored) Alexander; (penalty missed) Douglas; (penalty scored) Reeves; (penalty scored) Saunders

10 January 2012 Area Final 1	Barnet	1–1	Swindon Town	Underhill Stadium
19:45	Hughes 72'		Flint 44'	Attendance: 3,915; Referee: Nigel Miller

7 February 2012 Area Final 2	Swindon Town	1–0	Barnet	County Ground
19:45	Connell 17'			Attendance: 10,406; Referee: Darren Deadman

Swindon Town won 2–1 on aggregate

=== Herts Senior Cup ===
5 December 2011 2nd Round	Hemel Hempstead Town	1–2 (a.e.t.)	Barnet	Vauxhall Road
19:45			Parkes (pen); Lowe

31 January 2012 Quarter Final	Stevenage	5–0	Barnet	Broadhall Way
19:45

== Squad statistics ==
=== Appearances and goals ===
As of the end of the season

Number	Position	Nationality	Name	League		FA Cup		League Cup		FL Trophy		Total	
Number	Position	Nationality	Name	Apps.	Goals	Apps.	Goals	Apps.	Goals	Apps.	Goals	Apps.	Goals
1	GK	(England)	Dean Brill	36	0	2	0	2	0	5	0	45	0
2	DF	(England)	Danny Senda	19	0	2	0	2	0	4	0	27	0
3	DF	(England)	Jordan Parkes	11	0	0(1)	0	2	0	1(1)	0	14(2)	0
4	MF	(Northern Ireland)	Mark Hughes	44(1)	3	2	0	2	1	6	1	54(1)	5
5	DF	(Republic of Ireland)	Darren Dennehy	18(1)	0	1	0	0	0	2(1)	0	21(2)	0
7	FW	(England)	Scott McGleish (On loan from Bristol Rovers)	5(4)	0	0	0	0	0	0	0	5(4)	0
8	MF	(Republic of Ireland)	Mark Byrne	38(5)	5	2	0	2	0	5(1)	0	47(6)	5
9	FW	(England)	Steve Kabba	5(4)	1	0	0	0(1)	1	0(2)	1	5(7)	3
10	MF	(England)	Sam Deering	39(5)	3	2	0	1	0	6	0	48(5)	3
11	FW	(England)	Ricky Holmes	33(8)	8	0(1)	0	0(2)	1	3(1)	1	36(12)	10
12	DF	(England)	Jordan Mustoe (On loan from Wigan Athletic)	15(3)	0	0	0	0	0	0(1)	0	15(4)	0
14	MF	(England)	Sam Cox (On loan at Boreham Wood)	0	0	0	0	0	0	0	0	0	0
15	MF	(England)	Andy Yiadom	1(6)	1	0	0	0	0	0	0	1(6)	1
16	DF	(Switzerland)	Sead Hajrović (On loan from Arsenal)	7(3)	0	0	0	0	0	0	0	7(3)	0
17	DF	(England)	Michael Hector (On loan from Reading)	26(1)	2	1	0	0	0	3	0	30(1)	2
18	GK	(England)	Liam O'Brien	10	0	0	0	0	0	1	0	11	0
19	DF	(England)	Jack Saville	14(3)	0	1(1)	0	0	0	2	0	17(4)	0
20	MF	(Jamaica)	Mark Marshall	24(1)	1	2	0	2	0	5	2	33(1)	3
21	MF	(Cameroon)	Clovis Kamdjo	41	3	2	1	2	0	6	0	51	4
22	FW	(England)	Ben May (On loan from Stevenage)	9(2)	4	0	0	0	0	0	0	9(2)	4
23	FW	(England)	Izale McLeod	43(1)	18	1	1	2	0	6	3	52(1)	22
25	MF	(France)	Alassane N'Diaye	2(4)	0	0	0	0	0	0	0	2(4)	0
26	DF	(England)	Elliot Johnson	0	0	0	0	0	0	0	0	0	0
27	MF	(Portugal)	Mauro Vilhete	0(3)	0	0	0	0	0	0(1)	0	0(4)	0
30	DF	(England)	Paul Downing (On loan from West Brom)	25(1)	0	2	0	0	0	4	0	31(1)	0
31	MF	(England)	Luke Gambin	0(1)	0	0	0	0	0	0	0	0(1)	0
Players played for Barnet this season who have left the club:
6	DF	(England)	Exodus Geohaghon	0(2)	0	0	0	0(1)	0	1	0	1(3)	0
7	FW	(Democratic Republic of the Congo)	Cédric Baseya (On loan from Reading)	0(2)	0	0(1)	0	0	0	0	0	0(3)	0
12	DF	(England)	Ryan Watts	0	0	0	0	0	0	0	0	0	0
12	FW	(Ghana)	Lloyd Owusu	0(5)	0	0	0	0	0	0(1)	0	0(6)	0
15	DF	(England)	Anwar Uddin	9	0	0	0	2	0	1	0	12	0
16	DF	(England)	Gary Borrowdale (On loan from QPR)	11	0	1	0	0	0	3	0	15	0
22	DF	(Australia)	Daniel Leach	10(1)	1	0	0	0	0	0	0	10(1)	1
24	FW	(England)	Charlie Taylor	2(16)	1	1	1	0(1)	0	1(4)	1	4(21)	3
28	MF	(England)	Tommy Fraser	2(3)	0	0	0	1	0	0	0	3(3)	0
30	FW	(Wales)	Jason Price	5	1	0	0	2	0	0	0	7	1
31	FW	(Canada)	Gavin McCallum (On loan from Lincoln City)	0(2)	0	0	0	0	0	0	0	0(2)	0
37	MF	(England)	Jordan Obita (On loan from Reading)	3(2)	0	0	0	0	0	0(1)	0	3(3)	0

=== Top scorers ===
Place	Position	Nation	Number	Name	League Two	FA Cup	League Cup	FL Trophy	Total
1	FW	(England)	23	Izale McLeod	18	1	0	3	22
2	FW	(England)	11	Ricky Holmes	8	0	1	1	10
3=	MF	(Republic of Ireland)	8	Mark Byrne	5	0	0	0	5
3=	MF	(Northern Ireland)	4	Mark Hughes	3	0	1	1	5
5=	FW	(England)	22	Ben May	4	0	0	0	4
5=	MF	(Cameroon)	21	Clovis Kamdjo	3	1	0	0	4
7=	MF	(England)	10	Sam Deering	3	0	0	0	3
7=	FW	(England)	9	Steve Kabba	1	0	1	1	3
7=	MF	(England)	20	Mark Marshall	1	0	0	2	3
7=	FW	(England)	24	Charlie Taylor	1	1	0	1	3
11	DF	(England)	17	Michael Hector	2	0	0	0	2
12=	DF	(Australia)	22	Daniel Leach	1	0	0	0	1
12=	FW	(Wales)	30	Jason Price	1	0	0	0	1
12=	MF	(England)	15	Andy Yiadom	1	0	0	0	1
				Totals	52	3	3	9	67

== Transfers ==
=== Players Transferred In ===
Date	Pos.	Name	From	Fee	Ref.
23 May 2011	MF	(England) Sam Deering	(England) Oxford United	Free	
17 June 2011	MF	(Republic of Ireland) Mark Byrne	(England) Nottingham Forest	Free	
26 July 2011	DF	(England) Danny Senda	(England) Bristol Rovers	Free	
2 August 2011	GK	(England) Dean Brill	(England) Oldham Athletic	Free	
2 August 2011	FW	(Wales) Jason Price	(England) Carlisle United	Free	
2 August 2011	DF	(England) Ryan Watts	(England) Harrow Borough	Free	
15 August 2011	DF	(England) Exodus Geohaghon	(England) Peterborough United	Free	
12 September 2011	FW	(Ghana) Lloyd Owusu	(Cyprus) AEP Paphos	Free	
18 November 2011	MF	(France) Alassane N'Diaye	(England) Crystal Palace	Free	
31 January 2012	MF	(England) Andy Yiadom	(England) Braintree Town	Unknown	
1 February 2012	DF	(England) Jack Saville	(England) Southampton	Free	

=== Players Transferred Out ===
Date	Pos.	Name	From	Fee	Ref.
21 May 2011	GK	(England) Jake Cole	Free agent (Later signed for (England) Plymouth Argyle)	End of Contract	
21 May 2011	GK	(England) Tom Coulton	Free Agent	End of Youth Contract	
21 May 2011	DF	(England) Reece Yorke	Free Agent (Later signed for (England) St Albans City)	End of Contract	
21 May 2011	MF	(England) Rossi Jarvis	Free Agent (Later signed for (England) Cambridge United)	End of Contract	
21 May 2011	MF	(England) Glen Southam	Free Agent (Later signed for (England) Dover Athletic)	End of Contract	
21 May 2011	FW	(England) Kwame Adjeman-Pamboe	Free Agent (Later signed for (Greece) Agrotikos Asteras)	End of Contract	
21 May 2011	FW	(England) Charlie Stimson	Free Agent (Later signed for (England) Concord Rangers)	End of Contract	
21 May 2011	FW	(Republic of Ireland) Danny Kelly	Free Agent (Later signed for (England) Cambridge City)	End of Contract	
21 May 2011	FW	(England) Kofi Lockhart-Adams	Free Agent (Later signed for (England) Walton Casuals)	End of Youth Contract	
17 June 2011	DF	(England) Joe Devera	(England) Swindon Town	Free	
31 August 2011	FW	(Wales) Jason Price	Free Agent (Later signed for (England) Morecambe)	End of Contract	
31 August 2011	DF	(England) Ryan Watts	Free Agent (Later signed for (England) St Albans City)	End of Contract	
2 September 2011	DF	(England) Exodus Geohaghon	Free Agent (Later signed for (England) Darlington)	End of Contract	
24 November 2011	MF	(England) Tommy Fraser	Free Agent (Later signed for (England) Whitehawk)	Mutual Consent	
15 December 2011	FW	(Ghana) Lloyd Owusu	Free Agent (Later signed for (England) Slough Town)	End of Contract	
3 January 2012	DF	(Australia) Daniel Leach	Retired due to injury	Retired	
13 April 2012	FW	(England) Charlie Taylor	Free Agent (Later signed for (England) Eastbourne Borough)	Mutual Consent	

=== Players Loaned In ===
Date	Pos.	Name	From	Fee	Ref.
30 September 2011	DF	(England) Gary Borrowdale	(England) QPR	31 December 2011	
4 November 2011	DF	(England) Michael Hector	(England) Reading	End of the Season	
4 November 2011	DF	(England) Paul Downing	(England) West Bromwich Albion	End of the Season	
7 November 2011	DF	(England) Jack Saville	(England) Southampton	28 January 2012	
22 November 2011	FW	(Canada) Gavin McCallum	(England) Lincoln City	8 January 2012	
24 November 2011	FW	(France) Cédric Baseya	(England) Reading	7 January 2012	
18 January 2012	DF	(Switzerland) Sead Hajrović	(England) Arsenal	End of the Season	
27 January 2012	MF	(England) Jordan Obita	(England) Reading	27 February 2012	
30 January 2012	DF	(England) Jordan Mustoe	(England) Wigan Athletic	End of the Season	
1 March 2012	FW	(England) Scott McGleish	(England) Bristol Rovers	End of the Season	
10 March 2012	FW	(England) Ben May	(England) Stevenage	End of the Season	

=== Players Loaned Out ===
Date	Pos.	Name	From	Fee	Ref.
21 October 2011	MF	(England) Sam Cox	(England) Boreham Wood	End of the Season	
4 November 2011	FW	(Ghana) Lloyd Owusu	(England) Hayes and Yeading	4 December 2011	
4 November 2011	MF	(Portugal) Mauro Vilhete	(England) Hendon	4 December 2011	
19 January 2012	DF	(England) Jordan Parkes	(England) Farnborough	19 February 2012	
17 February 2012	MF	(Portugal) Mauro Vilhete	(England) Boreham Wood	End of the Season (recalled 4 April)	
