= 2010–11 Barnet F.C. season =

Barnet F.C.
2010–11 season
- Chairman: Anthony Kleanthous
- Manager: Mark Stimson (sacked 1 January); Paul Fairclough (until 23 March); Martin Allen (until 11 Apr); Giuliano Grazioli (caretaker)
- League Two: 22nd
- FA Cup: First round
- League Cup: First round
- Football League Trophy: Second round
- Top goalscorer: League: Izale McLeod (14); All: Izale McLeod (14)
- Highest home attendance: 4,478 vs. Port Vale (League Two)
- Lowest home attendance: 1,356 vs. Southend United (Football League Trophy)
- Average home league attendance: 2,219
Home colours	Away colours

This article documents the 2010–11 season for North London football club Barnet.

== Friendly matches ==
Pre-season match details
Date	Opponents	Venue	Result	Score F–A	Scorers	Attendance	Ref.
13 July 2010	Thurrock	A	W	2–1	Parkes, Hart		
17 July 2010	Arsenal	H	L	0–4		5,701	
21 July 2010	Watford	H	W	1–0	Holmes 77'	898	
24 July 2010	Charlton Athletic	H	W	1–0	Poole 56'		
27 July 2010	Southampton	H	L	0–1		851	
28 July 2010	Wingate & Finchley	A	W	1–0	5'		
31 July 2010	Peterborough United	H	L	1–3	Poole 26'		

== Competitions ==
=== League Two ===
==== League table ====
Pos	Team	Pld	W	D	L	GF	GA	GD	Pts	Promotion, qualification or relegation
20	Morecambe	46	13	12	21	54	73	−19	51	
21	Hereford United	46	12	17	17	50	66	−16	50 (Note: Torquay United deducted one point and Hereford United deducted three points)	
22	Barnet	46	12	12	22	58	77	−19	48	
23	Lincoln City (R)	46	13	8	25	45	81	−36	47	Relegation to Conference National
24	Stockport County (R)	46	9	14	23	48	96	−48	41	Relegation to Conference National

Updated to match(es) played on 28 May 2011. Source: The Football League
Rules for classification: 1) points; 2) goal difference; 3) number of goals scored.
(R) Relegated

==== Matches ====
League Two match details
Date	League position	Opponents	Venue	Result	Score F–A	Scorers	Attendance	Ref.
7 August 2010	18th	Chesterfield	A	L	1–2	Poole 70'	6,431	
14 August 2010	18th	Burton Albion	H	D	0–0		1,655	
21 August 2010	24th	Crewe Alexandra	A	L	0–7		3,171	
28 August 2010	24th	Bury	H	D	1–1	Marshall 75'	1,563	
4 September 2010	17th	Cheltenham Town	H	W	3–1	Walsh 12', 65', Marshall 80'	2,082	
11 September 2010	21st	Lincoln City	A	L	0–1		2,884	
18 September 2010	24th	Rotherham United	H	L	1–4	Byrne 81'	1,731	
25 September 2010	23rd	Morecambe	A	D	2–2	Kabba 53', Southam 69' pen.	2,221	
28 September 2010	23rd	Wycombe Wanderers	A	L	2–4	Walsh 74', Kabba 86'	3,518	
2 October 2010	21st	Hereford United	H	W	2–0	Marshall 14', Townsend 78' o.g.	1,745	
9 October 2010	23rd	Bradford City	H	L	0–2		2,435	
16 October 2010	23rd	Stockport County	A	L	1–2	Byrne 46'	4,177	
23 October 2010	22nd	Macclesfield Town	H	W	1–0	Byrne 9'	1,594	
30 October 2010	24th	Shrewsbury Town	A	L	1–2	Parkes 61'	5,331	
2 November 2010	24th	Stevenage	H	L	0–3		2,722	
13 November 2010	24th	Torquay United	A	D	1–1	Byrne 20'	2,257	
20 November 2010	23rd	Northampton Town	H	W	4–1	Kabba 10' pen., 43', Basey 47', Holmes 90'	1,918	
23 November 2010	23rd	Gillingham	H	L	1–2	Gallen 31'	2,519	
4 December 2010	23rd	Oxford United	A	L	1–2	Marshall 35'	6,004	
11 December 2010	23rd	Accrington Stanley	H	W	2–0	McLeod 12', 45'	2,250	
28 December 2010	23rd	Stockport County	H	L	1–3	McLeod 54'	2,045	
1 January 2011	23rd	Aldershot Town	H	L	1–2	McLeod 54'	1,902	
3 January 2011	24th	Stevenage	A	L	2–4	McLeod 73', Marshall 76'	3,744	
8 January 2011	22nd	Bradford City	A	W	3–1	Kiernan 61' o.g., Uddin 64', Holmes 67'	10,514	
15 January 2011	22nd	Shrewsbury Town	H	D	1–1	Taylor 90'	2,164	
22 January 2011	21st	Macclesfield Town	A	D	1–1	McLeod 55' pen.	1,655	
25 January 2011	23rd	Port Vale	A	D	0–0		4,112	
29 January 2011	23rd	Southend United	H	L	0–2		2,867	
5 February 2011	22nd	Northampton Town	A	D	0–0		4,573	
12 February 2011	24th	Torquay United	H	L	0–3		2,168	
19 February 2011	24th	Cheltenham Town	A	D	1–1	Devera 90+2'	2,926	
22 February 2011	24th	Southend United	A	L	1–2	Kabba 88'	5,501	
26 February 2011	22nd	Lincoln City	H	W	4–2	Kabba 6', 15' pen., Hughes 38', McLeod 68'	2,226	
5 March 2011	23rd	Rotherham United	A	D	0–0		3,566	
8 March 2011	23rd	Wycombe Wanderers	H	L	0–1		3,566	
12 March 2011	23rd	Hereford United	A	W	2–1	McLeod 44', 78'	2,517	
19 March 2011	23rd	Morecambe	H	L	1–2	Byrne 21'	2,510	
22 March 2011	23rd	Aldershot Town	A	L	0–1		2,420	
26 March 2011	23rd	Chesterfield	H	D	2–2	Deering 52', 90+4'	2,012	
2 April 2011	23rd	Burton Albion	A	W	4–1	Kabba 53', 64', 67' pen., 79'	2,774	
9 April 2011	23rd	Crewe Alexandra	H	W	2–1	Leach 11', McLeod 26'	2,212	
16 April 2011	23rd	Bury	A	L	0–2		3,082	
23 April 2011	23rd	Gillingham	A	W	4–2	Byrne 13', McLeod 45+1', 52', 70' pen.	6,170	
25 April 2011	23rd	Oxford United	H	D	2–2	Kamdjo 11', Hughes 60'	3,425	
30 April 2011	23rd	Accrington Stanley	A	L	1–3	Marshall 7'	2,764	
7 May 2011	22nd	Port Vale	H	W	1–0	McLeod 48' pen.	4,478	

=== FA Cup ===
FA Cup match details
Round	Date	Venue	Opponents	Result	Score F–A	Scorers	Attendance	Ref.
First round	6 November 2010	H	Charlton Athletic	D	0–0		2,684	
First round replay	16 November 2010	A	Charlton Athletic	L	0–1		4,803	

=== Football League Cup ===
League Cup match details
Round	Date	Venue	Opponents	Result	Score F–A	Scorers	Attendance	Ref.
First round	10 August 2010	A	Swansea City	L	0–3		6,644	

=== Football League Trophy ===
Football League Trophy match details
Round	Date	Venue	Opponents	Result	Score F–A	Scorers	Attendance	Ref.
Second round	5 October 2010	H	Southend United	L	1–3	Vilhete 79'	1,356	

=== Herts Senior Cup ===
Herts Senior Cup match details
Round	Date	Venue	Opponents	Result	Score F–A	Scorers	Attendance	Ref.
Second round	7 February 2011	A	Hadley	W	4–1 (a.e.t.)	Scott, Vilhete, Stimson, Lowe		
Quarter-final	24 February 2011	A	Broxbourne Borough V&E	W	6–2	Adjeman-Pamboe 22' Stimson 42' (pen.), 80', Scott 69', Lockhart-Adams 77', Vilhete 81'		
Semi-final	1 March 2011	A	Cheshunt	W	1–0 (a.e.t.)	Vilhete 108'		
Final	12 April 2011	H	Stevenage	W	2–1	Stimson (2)	435	

== Appearances and goals ==
As of 6 May 2011.
(Substitute appearances in brackets)

No.	Pos.	Name	League		FA Cup		League Cup		League Trophy		Total		Discipline	
No.	Pos.	Name	Apps	Goals	Apps	Goals	Apps	Goals	Apps	Goals	Apps	Goals	Yellow card	Red card
1	GK	(England) Jake Cole	31	0	2	0	1	0	1	0	35	0	2	0
2	DF	(England) Joe Devera	43	1	2	0	0	0	1	0	46	1	6	0
3	DF	(England) Jordan Parkes	37 (3)	0	1	0	0 (1)	0	1	0	39 (4)	0	10	0
4	MF	(Northern Ireland) Mark Hughes	31 (2)	2	1	0	1	0	0	0	33 (2)	2	9	0
5	DF	(Republic of Ireland) Darren Dennehy	4 (1)	0	0	0	1	0	0	0	5 (1)	0	0	0
6	DF	(England) Anwar Uddin	28 (2)	1	2	0	1	0	0	0	30 (2)	1	3	0
7	MF	(England) Rossi Jarvis	12 (10)	0	1	0	0	0	1	0	14 (10)	0	0	0
8	MF	(England) Glen Southam	31 (2)	1	2	0	1	0	0	0	34 (2)	1	11	0
9	FW	(England) Steve Kabba	23	11	2	0	0	0	0	0	25	11	3	0
10	MF	(England) Glenn Poole	6 (4)	1	0	0	1	0	0	0	7 (4)	1	0	0
10	MF	(England) Sam Deering	14 (2)	2	0	0	0	0	0	0	14 (2)	2	2	0
11	FW	(England) Ricky Holmes	14 (11)	2	0 (2)	0	1	0	1	0	16 (13)	2	3	0
12	FW	(England) Charlie Stimson	0 (6)	0	0 (1)	0	0	0	0	0	0 (7)	0	0	0
13	MF	(England) Sam Cox	5 (5)	0	0	0	1	0	0 (1)	0	6 (6)	0	0	0
14	FW	(Republic of Ireland) Danny Kelly	0 (3)	0	0	0	0 (1)	0	0	0	0 (4)	0	0	0
16	MF	(Wales) Anthony Pulis	4	0	0	0	0	0	0	0	4	0	0	1
17	MF	(England) Danny Hart	0	0	0	0	0 (1)	0	0	0	0 (1)	0	0	0
17	DF	(Republic of Ireland) John Dunleavy	1 (2)	0	0	0	0	0	0	0	1 (2)	0	0	0
18	GK	(England) Liam O'Brien	7 (1)	0	0	0	0	0	0	0	7 (1)	0	0	0
19	FW	(England) Kevin Gallen	6 (1)	1	2	0	0	0	0	0	8 (1)	1	0	0
19	FW	(England) Phil Walsh	6 (3)	3	0	0	0	0	1	0	7 (3)	3	1	0
19	FW	(England) Kwame Adjeman-Pamboe	0 (1)	0	0	0	0	0	0	0	0 (1)	0	0	0
20	MF	(Jamaica) Mark Marshall	45 (1)	6	2	0	1	0	1	0	49 (1)	6	6	0
21	DF	(Cameroon) Clovis Kamdjo	27 (4)	1	0	0	0	0	1	0	28 (4)	1	2	0
22	DF	(Australia) Daniel Leach	15	1	0	0	1	0	0	0	16	1	4	0
23	FW	(England) Izale McLeod	25 (4)	14	0 (1)	0	0	0	0	0	25 (5)	14	5	0
24	FW	(England) Charlie Taylor	2 (16)	1	0	0	0	0	1	0	3 (16)	1	1	0
25	GK	(England) Tom Coulton	1	0	0	0	0	0	0	0	1	0	0	0
26	DF	(Wales) Grant Basey	11	1	2	0	0	0	1	0	14	1	1	0
27	MF	(Portugal) Mauro Vilhete	6 (14)	0	0 (1)	0	0	0	0 (1)	1	6 (16)	1	2	0
28	DF	(England) George Francomb	13	0	2	0	0	0	0	0	15	0	1	0
28	MF	(England) Tommy Fraser	9 (5)	0	0	0	0	0	0	0	9 (5)	0	2	0
30	MF	(Jamaica) Craig Dobson	0 (1)	0	0	0	0	0	0	0	0 (1)	0	0	0
30	DF	(England) Matty Parsons	7 (1)	0	0	0	0	0	0	0	7 (1)	0	0	1
31 & 16	MF	(Republic of Ireland) Mark Byrne	26 (2)	6	1	0	1	0	1	0	29 (2)	6	7	0
32	FW	(England) Jack Midson	3 (2)	0	0	0	0	0	0	0	3 (2)	0	0	0
34	GK	(England) Sam Walker	7	0	0	0	0	0	0	0	7	0	0	1
35	DF	(England) Jude Stirling	5 (1)	0	0	0	0	0	0	0	5 (1)	0	1	0

== Transfers ==
Players transferred in
Date	Pos.	Name	From	Fee	Ref.
15 June 2010	MF	(England) Glen Southam	(England) Histon	Free	
15 June 2010	FW	(England) Ricky Holmes	(England) Chelmsford City	Free	
15 June 2010	MF	(England) Glenn Poole	(England) AFC Wimbledon	Free	
21 June 2010	DF	(England) Anwar Uddin	(England) Dagenham & Redbridge	Free	
21 June 2010	MF	(England) Sam Cox	(England) Tottenham Hotspur	Free	
21 June 2010	MF	(Republic of Ireland) Danny Kelly	(England) Norwich City	Free	
1 July 2010	MF	(England) Rossi Jarvis	(England) Luton Town	Free	
2 July 2010	FW	(England) Charlie Stimson	(England) Gillingham	Free (Bosman)	
2 July 2010	DF	(England) Jordan Parkes	(England) Watford	Free	
12 July 2010	DF	(Republic of Ireland) Darren Dennehy	(Wales) Cardiff City	Free	
28 July 2010	FW	(Sierra Leone) Steve Kabba	(England) Brentford	Free	
29 July 2010	MF	(England) Mark Marshall	(England) Swindon Town	Free	
31 August 2010	FW	(England) Charlie Taylor	(England) Sutton United	Undisclosed	
27 September 2010	DF	(Wales) Grant Basey	(England) Charlton Athletic	Free	
29 September 2010	FW	(England) Izale McLeod	(England) Charlton Athletic	Free	
1 November 2010	MF	(Jamaica) Craig Dobson	(England) Thurrock	Dual Registration	
6 January 2011	GK	(England) Liam O'Brien	(England) Portsmouth	Free	
20 January 2011	MF	(England) Tommy Fraser	(England) Port Vale	Free	
24 February 2011	MF	(England) Kwame Adjeman-Pamboe	(United States) Tampa Bay	Free	
Players loaned in
Date from	Pos.	Name	From	Date to	Ref.
14 July 2010	MF	(Republic of Ireland) Mark Byrne	(England) Nottingham Forest	24 November 2010	
13 August 2010	FW	(England) Phil Walsh	(England) Dagenham & Redbridge	9 October 2010	
15 October 2010	DF	(England) George Francomb	(England) Norwich City	9 January 2011	
22 October 2010	FW	(England) Kevin Gallen	(England) Luton Town	8 January 2011	
12 January 2011	DF	(Republic of Ireland) John Dunleavy	(England) Wolverhampton Wanderers	End of season	
8 February 2011	MF	(England) Sam Deering	(England) Oxford United	End of season	
8 February 2011	MF	(Wales) Anthony Pulis	(England) Southampton	End of season	
2 March 2011	MF	(Republic of Ireland) Mark Byrne	(England) Nottingham Forest	End of season	
2 March 2011	DF	(England) Matty Parsons	(England) Crystal Palace	2 April 2011	
21 March 2011	FW	(England) Jack Midson	(England) Oxford United	End of season	
24 March 2011	DF	(England) Jude Stirling	(England) Milton Keynes Dons	End of season	
24 March 2011	GK	(England) Sam Walker	(England) Chelsea	End of season	
Players loaned out
Date from	Pos.	Name	To	Date to	Ref.
24 August 2010	MF	(England) Danny Hart	(England) Thurrock	23 October 2010	
3 September 2010	DF	(England) Reece Yorke	(England) Harlow Town	3 October 2010	
5 November 2010	DF	(England) Reece Yorke	(England) Wealdstone	5 December 2010	
10 December 2010	DF	(England) Reece Yorke	(England) Harlow Town	8 January 2011	
21 January 2011	FW	(Republic of Ireland) Danny Kelly	(England) Dover Athletic	21 February 2011	
8 March 2011	FW	(Republic of Ireland) Danny Kelly	(England) Eastbourne Borough	8 April 2011	
Players transferred out
Date	Pos.	Name	Subsequent club	Fee	Ref.
1 July 2010	MF	(England) Albert Adomah	(England) Bristol City	£150,000	
Players released
Date	Pos.	Name	Subsequent club	Join date	Ref.
4 June 2010	MF	(England) Joe Tabiri	(England) Dover Athletic	1 July 2010	
17 June 2010	DF	(Republic of Ireland) Gary Breen	Retired		
29 June 2010	MF	(Sierra Leone) Albert Jarrett	(England) Lincoln City	1 July 2010 (Bosman)	
1 July 2010	DF	(England) Ismail Yakubu	(England) AFC Wimbledon	2 July 2010	
1 July 2010	FW	(England) Cliff Akurang	(England) Thurrock	9 July 2010	
1 July 2010	MF	(Jamaica) Micah Hyde	(England) Billericay Town	9 July 2010	
1 July 2010	FW	(England) Paul Furlong	(England) Kettering Town	21 July 2010	
1 July 2010	FW	(England) Luke Medley	(England) Mansfield Town	8 August 2010	
1 July 2010	DF	(Sierra Leone) Ahmed Deen	(England) Hayes & Yeading United	11 August 2010	
1 July 2010	DF	(Northern Ireland) Ryan O'Neill	(Northern Ireland) Dungannon Swifts	11 August 2010	
1 July 2010	MF	(England) Nicky Deverdics	(England) Blyth Spartans	12 August 2010	
1 July 2010	MF	(England) David Livermore	(England) Histon	23 August 2010	
1 July 2010	GK	(England) Will Viner	(England) Woking	24 August 2010	
1 July 2010	FW	(England) Jake Hyde	(England) Hayes & Yeading United	23 October 2010	
1 July 2010	MF	(New Zealand) Chris James	(Australia) APIA Leichhardt Tigers	unknown	
23 July 2010	FW	(Republic of Ireland) John O'Flynn	(England) Exeter City	23 July 2010 (Bosman)	
30 July 2010	DF	(France) Kenny Gillet	(Scotland) Inverness Caledonian Thistle	30 July 2010 (Bosman)	
14 October 2010	GK	(England) Phil Carpenter	(England) Hampton & Richmond Borough	8 November 2010	
6 January 2011	DF	(Wales) Grant Basey	(England) Peterborough United	21 January 2011	
7 January 2011	MF	(England) Danny Hart	(England) Harrow Borough	3 March 2011	
10 January 2011	MF	(Jamaica) Craig Dobson	(England) Braintree Town	23 January 2011	
31 January 2011	MF	(England) Glenn Poole	(England) Braintree Town	5 February 2011	
