= Grant Basey =

Footballer (born 1988)

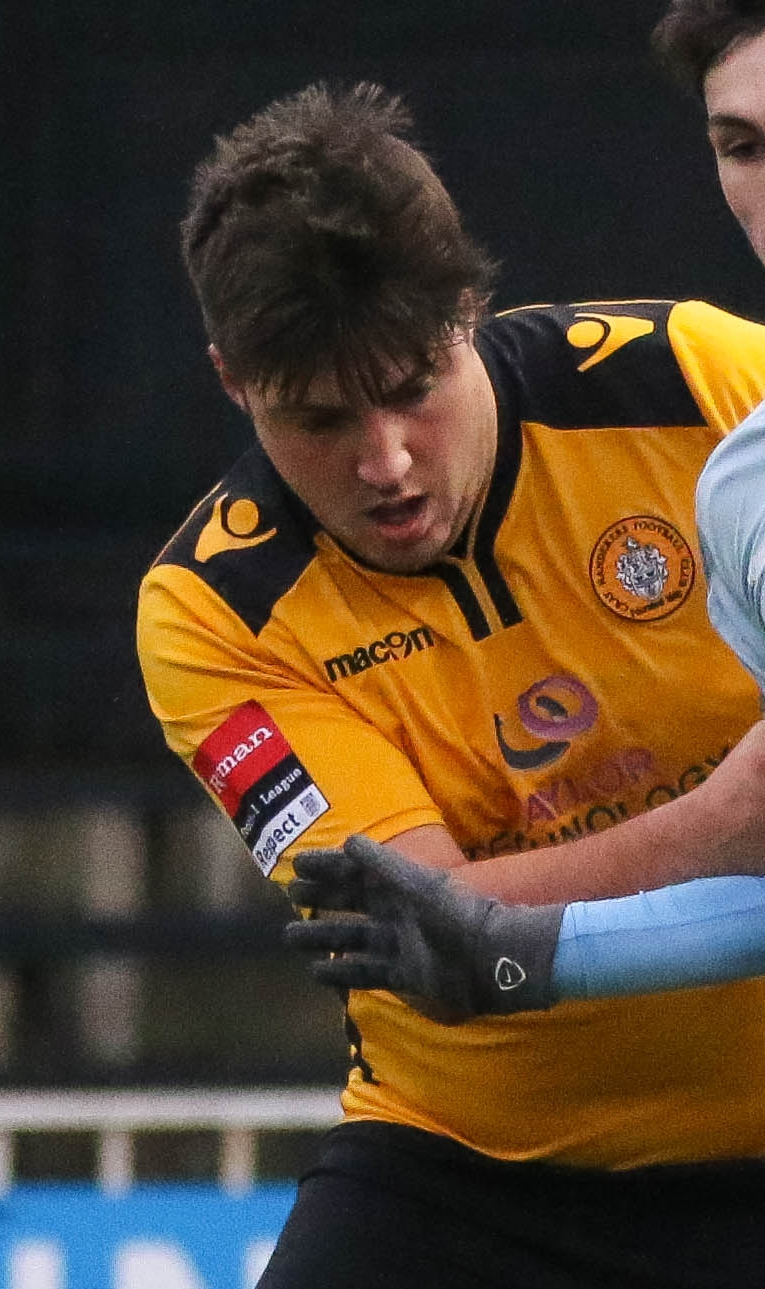
- Basey playing for Cray Wanderers in 2017

Personal information
- Full name: Grant William Basey
- Date of birth: 30 November 1988 (age 37)
- Place of birth: Farnborough, London, England
- Height: 6 ft 0 in (1.83 m)
- Position: Left-back

Youth career
- ?–2007: Charlton Athletic

Senior career*
Years	Team	Apps	(Gls)
2007–2010	Charlton Athletic	46	(1)
2007	→ Brentford (loan)	8	(0)
2010–2011	Barnet	11	(1)
2011–2012	Peterborough United	10	(1)
2011	→ Wycombe Wanderers (loan)	12	(0)
2012–2013	Wycombe Wanderers	23	(2)
2013	Ebbsfleet United	0	(0)
2014–2015	VCD Athletic	39	(0)
2015–2017	Cray Wanderers	51	(10)
Total		200	(15)

International career
2005–2006	Wales U17	2	(0)
2006–2008	Wales U19	12	(1)
2006–2009	Wales U21	1	(0)

Managerial career
- 2021–2022: Cray Wanderers (interim)
- 2022–2023: VCD Athletic
- * Club domestic league appearances and goals

Grant William Basey (born 30 November 1988) is a former professional footballer who played as a left-back. Born in England, he represented Wales internationally at youth level.

== Playing career ==
=== Charlton Athletic ===
Basey joined the Charlton Athletic Academy, having been spotted on one of the club's community courses, and signed his first professional contract with Charlton in March 2007.

Basey made his Charlton Athletic debut against Queens Park Rangers on 27 October 2007, where he started and played the whole, in a 1–0 loss. But during a 3–0 loss against Sheffield United on 27 November 2007, he suffered a groin injury that kept him out for several months. Although he was told by the club's management that he's expected to be loaned out, this never happened and stayed. Basey scored his first ever professional goal in the 4–1 victory over Coventry City on 4 May 2008, just three days after signing a new two-year deal keeping him at The Valley until 2010. At the end of the 2007–08 season, he went on to make nine appearances, scoring once.

Ahead of the 2008–09 season, Basey was expected to fight for a first team place by Manager Alan Pardew. Basey did make a good start in the opening game of the season when he set up a goal for Andy Gray from a free-kick, just several minutes coming on as a second-half substitute, in a 2–0 win over Swansea City. However, Basey lost his first team place and never played again from February onward, which saw the club relegated to League One.

Following the club's relegation, Basey didn't make an appearance until on 3 October 2009, where he came on as a late substitute, in a 0–0 draw against Leeds United. Basey then provided assists six times this season against Bristol Rovers, Brighton & Hove Albion, Stockport County, Millwall, Swindon Town and Hartlepool United. In a 2–1 loss Bristol Rovers on 15 February 2010, he suffered an ankle ligament damage in the early-first half. The injury ruled Basey out for the rest of the 2009–10 season.

In July 2010, Basey returned to the club's first team in the pre-season from injury.

==== Brentford (loan) ====
At the start of the 2007–08 season he had a three-month spell on loan at Brentford and made his debut in the opening game of the season, in a 1–1 draw against Mansfield Town. His loan spell at Brentford was extended for another month, going on to make ten appearances for Brentford, eight of which were in the league, before returning to his parent club in mid-October 2007.

=== Barnet ===
After spending time on trial at Aberdeen, Basey signed for League Two club Barnet on a four-month contract. It came after Charlton manager Phil Parkinson said it was unlikely Basey would return to Charlton.

He made his debut in the centre of defence alongside Clovis Kamdjo in the 2–0 victory over Hereford United on 2 October 2010. However, in the next game, on 9 October 2010, with a 2–0 loss against Bradford City, Basey suffered ankle injury in the early-second half. After three weeks on the sidelines, he returned to the first team against Stevenage on 2 November 2010, which saw Barnet lose 3–0. Several weeks after returning to the first team, Basey scored his first Barnet goal, in a 4–0 win over Northampton Town on 20 November 2010. From that moment on, Basey continued to be in the first team regular for the side until his departure, making thirteen appearances and scoring once for the side.

On 6 January 2011, Basey had his contract with Barnet terminated by temporary manager Paul Fairclough after his dedication to the club had been questioned.

=== Peterborough United ===
Basey joined Peterborough United on 21 January 2011 on a contract until the end of the season.

However, Basey spent five matches as an unused substitute after joining the club. But was given a first team chance following the club's defensive crisis. He made his debut on 15 February 2011 in the 2–0 victory away at Yeovil Town, and scored Peterborough's second as they look to climb up the League One table. Three days later, he signed a contract extension with Peterborough, keeping him at the club until the end of the 2011–12 season. Although he returned to the substitute bench later on, Basey appeared in the first team several times before being sidelined for the rest of the season with a knee injury.

Following the club's promotion to the Championship, Basey played three times for the side in the 2011–12 season, playing in the left-back. However, Basey lost his first place in the left-back to Craig Alcock.

=== Wycombe Wanderers ===
After Peterborough United's failed attempt to get Basey to leave the club in the summer transfer window, Basey subsequently moved to Wycombe Wanderers initially on loan.

Two days after signing for the club, Basey made his Wycombe Wanderers debut on 8 October 2011, where he played and started the whole game, in a 1–1 draw against Walsall. After making five appearances since joining the club, his loan spell at Wycombe Wanderers was extended until the end of December. Just as he was about to return to his parent club, he signed a permanent contract with the club, keeping him until the end of the 2012–13 season. Basey then provided two assists on 25 February 2012, in a 5–0 win over Hartlepool United. After returning to the first team from injury at a car accident, he went on to score two more goals as the 2011–12 season progressed, against Stevenage, and Notts County At the end of the 2011–12 season, which saw Wycombe Wanderers relegated back to League Two, Basey went on to make thirty-three appearances and scoring two times in all competitions.

However, in the 2012–13 season, Basey appeared four times at the start of the season in all competitions before being sidelined for the rest of the season after rupturing his anterior cruciate ligament in training. At the end of the 2012–13 season, Basey was released by the club. During his time there, he made 35 appearances over two seasons.

=== Ebbsfleet United ===
After leaving Wycombe Wanderers, Basey joined Ebbsfleet United on 1 October 2013. He made his Ebbsfleet United debut on 29 October 2013, in a 1–0 loss against Dartford. Although he made another appearance for Ebbsfleet United, his brief spell at Ebbsfleet United, however, was cut short by injury.

=== VCD Athletic ===
Basey resumed his playing career at VCD Athletic.

=== Cray Wanderers ===
Basey joined Cray Wanderers in July 2015. He was voted Supporters' Player of the Year in his first season at Cray. Having attempted a comeback after a serious injury, sustained in an FA Cup tie at Faversham Town, had sidelined him for a long period, Basey announced his retirement from playing in February 2017.

== International career ==
Despite being born in England, Basey chose to represent Wales, qualifying for the Welsh set-up on account of his grandmother being born in Cardiff. Basey was also previously called up for the Wales U17 and Wales U19.

He was selected for the Welsh under-21s squad for a 3–2 loss to Israel in 2007. Basey received another call up to the Wales squad for the friendly match against England on 15 May 2008. Given the number 12 shirt, he was an unused substitute in his team's 2–0 loss at Wrexham's Racecourse Ground. It wasn't until on 27 March 2009 when he made his Wales U21 debut, making his first start and playing the whole game, in a 0–0 draw against Luxembourg U21.

== Coaching career ==
=== Charlton Athletic ===
Basey was the Charlton Athletic Kit Manager between 2018 and 2019 before being promoted to First Team Development Coach, providing a link between the first team and the club's academy.

=== Cray Wanderers ===
On 31 December 2021, Basey was named interim manager of former-club Cray Wanderers.

On 22 March 2022, Basey was replaced by Neil Smith as manager of Cray Wanderers.

=== VCD Athletic ===
On 19 May 2022, Basey was named as manager for VCD Athletic.

On 18 February 2023, Basey resigned as manager following a 2–0 defeat at home to Whitehawk.

== Personal life ==
He lives in Chislehurst and attended Red Hill Primary School in Chislehurst before attending Coopers Technology College for his secondary education.

Basey took part in the 2016 London Marathon to raise money for the Institute of Cancer Research after losing his mother to bowel cancer. He also took part in the previous year.

== Career statistics ==
As of match played 31 May 2017

Appearances and goals by club, season and competition
Club	Season	League			FA Cup		League Cup		Other		Total	
Club	Season	Division	Apps	Goals	Apps	Goals	Apps	Goals	Apps	Goals	Apps	Goals
Charlton Athletic	2007–08	Championship	8	1	1	0	0	0	0	0	9	1
Charlton Athletic	2008–09	Championship	19	0	2	0	1	0	0	0	22	0
Charlton Athletic	2009–10	League One	19	0	0	0	1	0	2 (Note: Two appearances in the EFL Trophy)	0	22	0
Charlton Athletic	Total		46	1	3	0	2	0	2	0	53	1
Brentford (loan)	2007–08	League Two	8	0	0	0	1	0	1 (Note: One appearance in the EFL Trophy)	0	10	0
Barnet	2010–11	League Two	11	1	2	0	0	0	1 (Note: One appearance in the EFL Trophy)	0	14	1
Peterborough United	2010–11	League One	7	1	0	0	0	0	2 (Note: Two appearances in the League One Play-Offs)	0	9	1
Peterborough United	2011–12	Championship	3	0	0	0	1	0	0	0	4	0
Peterborough United	Total		10	0	0	0	1	0	2	0	13	0
Wycombe Wanderers	2011–12	League One	32	2	1	0	0	0	0	0	33	2
Wycombe Wanderers	2012–13	League Two	3	0	0	0	1	0	0	0	4	0
Wycombe Wanderers	Total		35	2	1	0	1	0	0	0	37	2
Ebbsfleet United	2013–14	Conference South	0	0	0	0	0	0	2 (Note: Two appearances in the Kent Senior Cup)	0	2	0
VCD Athletic	2014–15	Isthmian League Premier Division	39	0	2	0	0	0	1 (Note: One appearance in the FA Trophy)	0	42	0
Cray Wanderers	2015–16	Isthmian League Division One North	44	10	2	0	0	0	2 (Note: One appearance in the FA Trophy) (Note: One appearance in the Isthmian League Division One North Play-Offs)	0	48	10
Cray Wanderers	2016–17	Isthmian League Division One South	7	0	2	2	0	0	0	0	9	2
Cray Wanderers	Total		51	10	4	2	0	0	2	0	57	12
Career total			200	15	12	2	5	0	11	0	228	17

== Managerial statistics ==
As of match played 18 February 2023

Managerial record by team and tenure
Team	From	To	Record				
Team	From	To	P	W	D	L	Win %
Cray Wanderers (interim)	31 December 2021	22 March 2022	17	5	5	7	29.4
VCD Athletic	19 May 2022	18 February 2023	32	9	7	16	28.1
Total			49	14	12	23	28.6

== Honours ==
Peterborough United

- Football League One play-offs: 2011
