= Clovis Kamdjo =

Cameroonian footballer (born 1990)

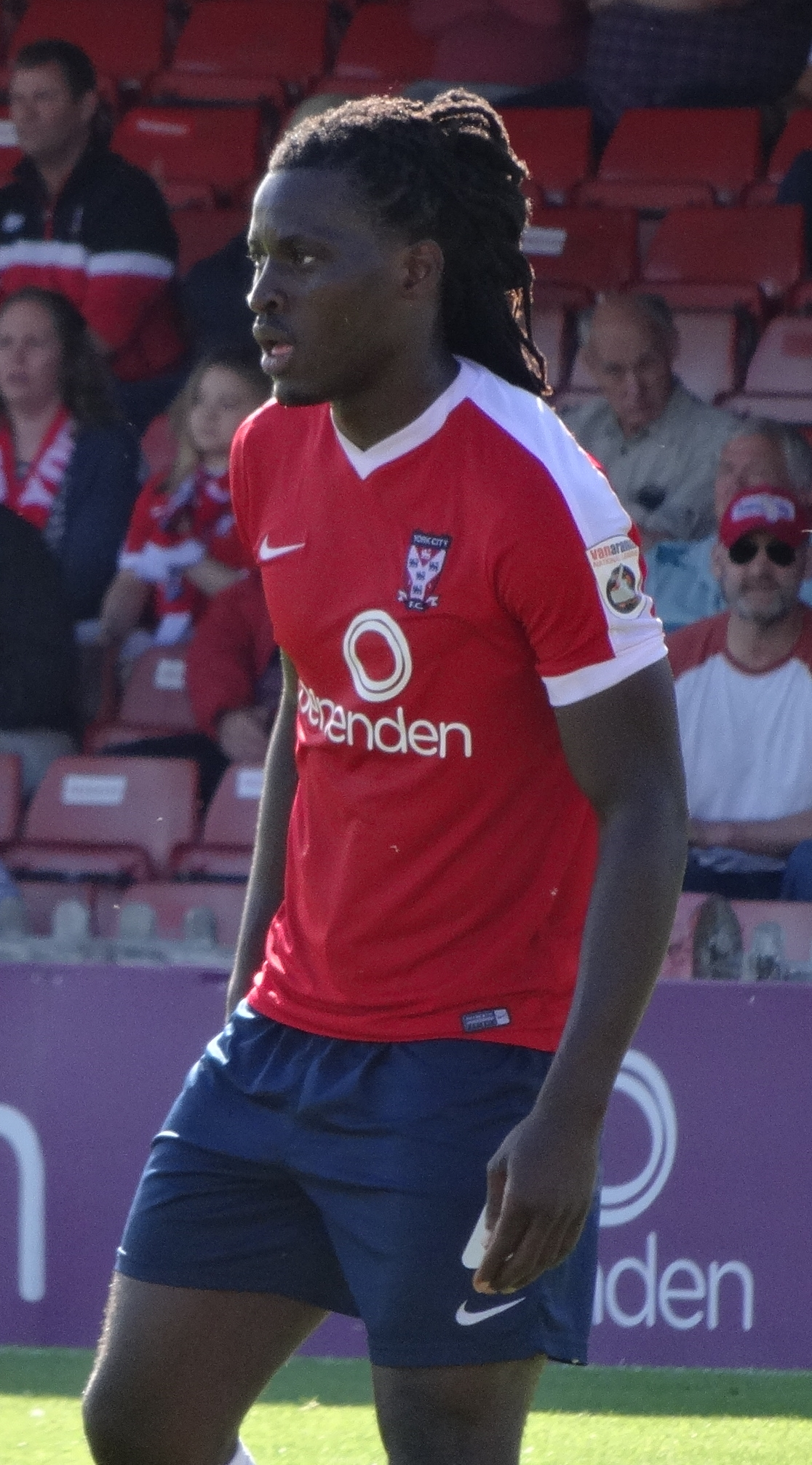
- Kamdjo playing for York City in 2016

Personal information
- Full name: Clovis Kamdjo Tchoumbou
- Date of birth: 15 December 1990 (age 35)
- Place of birth: Cameroon
- Height: 1.80 m (5 ft 11 in)
- Positions: Defender; midfielder

Youth career
- 2005–2009: Reading

Senior career*
Years	Team	Apps	(Gls)
2009–2013	Barnet	114	(5)
2013–2014	Salisbury City	37	(4)
2014–2016	Forest Green Rovers	39	(5)
2015–2016	→ Boreham Wood (loan)	31	(3)
2016–2018	York City	17	(1)
2018–2019	St Albans City	23	(6)
2019–2020	Maidstone United	9	(1)
- * Club domestic league appearances and goals as of 18:50, 24 May 2019 (UTC)

Clovis Kamdjo Tchoumbou (born 15 December 1990) is a Cameroonian professional footballer who plays as a defender or midfielder.

Kamdjo came to England at the age of 14 and started his career in the Academy at Reading in 2005. He was youth team captain and featured regularly for the youth and reserve team, although he failed to make a first-team appearance for the club. He was sent out on work experience to Cheltenham Town and also had a trial with the club. He was released from the club in 2009 and joined Barnet on a free transfer after being on trial. He became a regular in the 2010–11 season, playing a part in the team avoiding relegation from the Football League in the last match of the season.

In the summer of 2013, Kamdjo dropped into the Conference Premier, signing for Salisbury City. He joined Forest Green Rovers on a two-year contract a year later. Kamdjo represented his native Cameroon at under-17 level.

== Club career ==
=== Early career ===
Kamdjo left his native Cameroon in 2005 at the age of 14, to pursue a career in professional football. He joined Reading in 2005, and progressed through their Academy, playing regularly for the youth team and eventually became youth team captain. He scored five goals in 23 appearances for Reading's youth team in the 2008–09 season, and also featured for the reserve team. In April 2009, Kamdjo was sent on work experience to League Two club Cheltenham Town after learning that he would not be offered a professional contract with Reading. The terms of the deal meant that he would be able to feature in reserve and youth team matches for Cheltenham.

=== Barnet ===
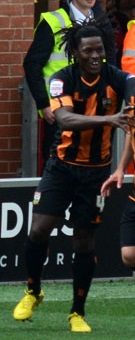
Kamdjo playing for Barnet in 2012

Kamdjo signed for League Two club Barnet on a one-year contract on 9 August 2009, after being on trial following his release from Reading and his subsequent trial at Cheltenham. Manager Ian Hendon handed Kamdjo his first-team debut on 22 August 2009, in the League Two 1–0 away win over Torquay United. He featured at centre back due to an injury crisis at the North London club. He featured in the first team throughout September, October and November, but faced a lengthy spell out until late February 2010 when he required surgery after rupturing medial collateral ligaments and cartilage damage in a block tackle in the match against Hereford United. He made his return to first team action in February 2010 in a 2–0 win over Port Vale. Kamdjo featured in seven more matches in the remainder of 2009–10, which included being sent off against Accrington Stanley for a professional foul, conceding a penalty.

In May 2010, Kamdjo signed a new two-year contract extension after impressing in his first full season as a professional. The 2010–11 season saw the appointment of Mark Stimson as manager, and Kamdjo found himself down the pecking order with the arrivals of new defenders Anwar Uddin, Jordan Parkes and also the re-signing of Daniel Leach. His first appearance of the season came on 18 September 2010, in a 4–1 home defeat to Rotherham United, coming on as a substitute for Daniel Leach. In late September 2010, defenders Daniel Leach and Darren Dennehy sustained long-term injuries, and Kamdjo was the only recognised centre back left to partner captain Anwar Uddin. This flung Clovis into first team action throughout October, before again returning to the substitutes bench in November and December. On 1 January 2011, manager Mark Stimson was dismissed as Barnet found themselves in the relegation zone, and was replaced by caretaker manager Paul Fairclough. The appointment saw Kamdjo become first choice and featured regularly in the first three months of the new year. In March 2011, Martin Allen was appointed as manager and this saw a turn in Barnet's fortunes. He scored his first career goal on 25 April 2011, with a header from Mark Byrne's cross in a 2–2 draw with Oxford United. Barnet went into the last league match of the season needing a final day win over Port Vale to ensure survival ahead of Lincoln City. Kamdjo featured in the 1–0 victory over Vale, ensuring Barnet's Football League status.

At the start of 2011–12, former Northern Ireland manager Lawrie Sanchez was appointed as new manager at Barnet. Kamdjo kept his place in the first team despite the change of manager and started in the first match of the season in a 1–0 away win over Morecambe. He then scored his second goal for Barnet in the fourth match of the season, opening the scoring with a powering header in a 2–2 draw away with Rotherham United.

On 22 May 2013, Barnet confirmed that Kamdjo had been released following the expiry of his contract.

=== Salisbury City ===
On 7 August 2013, he signed for Salisbury City, newly promoted into the Conference Premier. He made his debut three days later in Salisbury's opening day defeat to Tamworth.

=== Forest Green Rovers ===
On 13 June 2014, Kamdjo joined Salisbury's Conference Premier rivals Forest Green Rovers on a two-year contract. He made his debut on the opening day of 2014–15 in a 1–0 away win over Southport. He scored his first Forest Green goal three days later in a 2–1 home win over Chester.

After making a limited number of appearances at the start of 2015–16, he joined Forest Green's National League rials Boreham Wood on loan in September 2015. On 4 January 2016, his loan deal was extended until the end of the season. He returned to Forest Green at the end of his loan spell and played in their play-off semi-final second leg match against Dover Athletic. He was an unused substitute for the 2016 National League play-off final at Wembley Stadium on 15 May 2016, in which Forest Green were beaten 3–1 by Grimsby Town. A day later, he was released by the club.

=== Later career ===
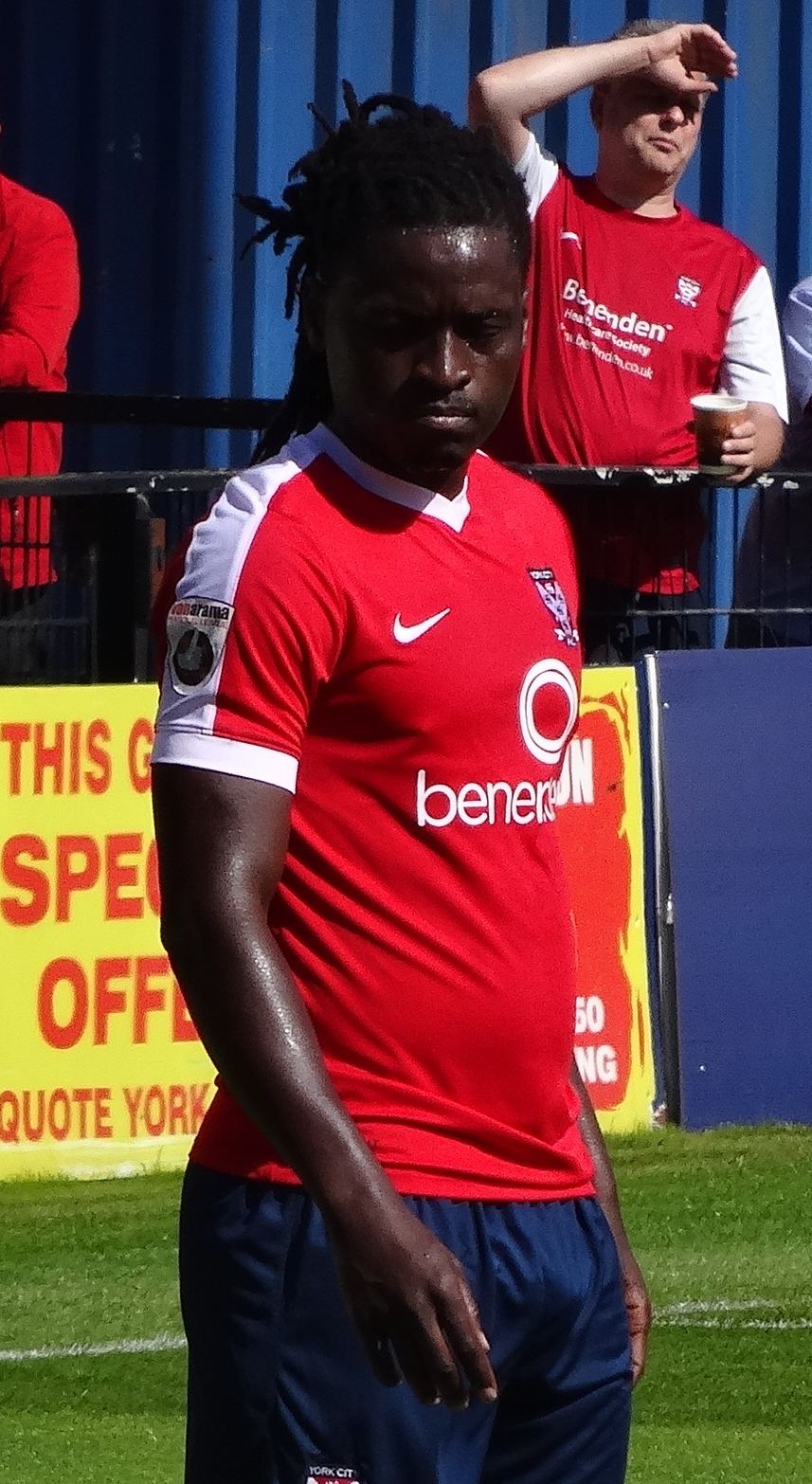
Kamdjo playing for York City in 2016

Kamdjo signed for newly relegated National League club York City on 30 June 2016 on a two-year contract.

Kamdjo signed for National League South club St Albans City on 31 August 2018. He made his debut the following day as a 69th-minute substitute in a 2–0 win at home to Dartford in the league.

Kamdjo joined Maidstone United for the 2019–20 season.

== International career ==
Kamdjo represented his native Cameroon at under-17 level.

== Style of play ==
Kamdjo began his career as a defender, playing at centre back or right back. Barnet manager Mark Stimson stated that Kamdjo has "a similar style to Linvoy Primus, if he can get anywhere near that standard he'll be OK". Barnet assistant manager Giuliano Grazioli stated after a pre-season win over Gabala in 2011 that "Clovis was immense and he is always getting better". His boyhood idol is former Cameroon international captain Rigobert Song. Kamdjo said in his time in Reading's youth team that "it's been good to have André Bikey in the Reading first team squad as he is someone I look up to". In 2011–12, Barnet manager Lawrie Sanchez switched Kamdjo to a defensive midfield role. According to the Barnet & Potters Bar Times, he "thrived" in that position, and was helped by playing alongside Edgar Davids.

== Career statistics ==
As of match played end of 2019-20 season

Appearances and goals by club, season and competition
Club	Season	League			FA Cup		League Cup		Other		Total	
Club	Season	Division	Apps	Goals	Apps	Goals	Apps	Goals	Apps	Goals	Apps	Goals
Barnet	2009–10	League Two	15	0	1	0	0	0	1 (Note: Appearance(s) in Football League Trophy)	0	17	0
Barnet	2010–11	League Two	32	1	0	0	0	0	1	0	33	1
Barnet	2011–12	League Two	41	3	2	1	2	0	6	0	51	4
Barnet	2012–13	League Two	26	1	1	0	1	0	1	0	29	1
Barnet	Total		114	5	4	1	3	0	9	0	130	6
Salisbury City	2013–14	Conference Premier	37	4	3	0	—		1 (Note: Appearance(s) in FA Trophy)	0	41	4
Forest Green Rovers	2014–15	Conference Premier	35	5	2	0	—		2	0	39	5
Forest Green Rovers	2015–16	National League	4	0	—		—		1 (Note: Appearance in National League play-offs)	0	5	0
Forest Green Rovers	Total		39	5	2	0	—		3	0	44	5
Boreham Wood (loan)	2015–16	National League	31	3	3	0	—		1	0	35	3
York City	2016–17	National League	15	1	2	0	—		0	0	17	1
York City	2017–18	National League North	2	0	0	0	—		0	0	2	0
York City	Total		17	1	2	0	—		0	0	19	1
St Albans City	2018–19	National League South	23	6	2	0	—		0	0	25	6
Maidstone United	2019–20	National League South	9	1	3	0	—		1	0	13	1
Career total			257	22	17	1	3	0	15	0	292	23
