= Daniel Hart =

Daniel Hart may refer to:

- Danny Hart (footballer) (born 1989), English footballer
- Danny Hart (cyclist) (born 1991), English mountain biker
- Daniel Hart (musician), American musician
- Daniel Anthony Hart (1927–2008), American prelate of the Roman Catholic Church
