= Izale McLeod =

English footballer

Personal information
- Full name: Izale Michael McLeod
- Date of birth: 15 October 1984 (age 42)
- Place of birth: Perry Barr, England
- Position: Forward

Youth career
- –2002: Derby County

Senior career*
Years	Team	Apps	(Gls)
2002–2004	Derby County	39	(4)
2004	→ Sheffield United (loan)	7	(0)
2004–2007	Milton Keynes Dons	117	(54)
2007–2010	Charlton Athletic	31	(3)
2008	→ Colchester United (loan)	2	(0)
2009	→ Millwall (loan)	7	(2)
2010	→ Peterborough United (loan)	4	(0)
2010–2012	Barnet	73	(32)
2012	Portsmouth	24	(10)
2013–2014	Milton Keynes Dons	49	(8)
2013	→ Northampton Town (loan)	4	(1)
2014–2015	Crawley Town	42	(19)
2015–2016	Notts County	37	(9)
2016	Yeovil Town	4	(0)
2016	Corby Town	1	(0)
2017	Wrexham	15	(1)
2018–2020	Kempston Rovers	36	(15)
Total		492	(158)

International career
2006	England U21	1	(0)
- * Club domestic league appearances and goals as of 16:24, 25 February 2020 (UTC)

Izale Michael McLeod (born 15 October 1984) is an English retired professional footballer who played as a forward. He has played in The Football League for Derby County, Milton Keynes Dons, Charlton Athletic, Barnet, Portsmouth, Crawley Town, Notts County and Yeovil Town. He also played for England U21.

McLeod is the all-time leading scorer for Milton Keynes Dons with 71 goals in 188 appearances.

== Club career ==
=== Derby County ===
Born in Perry Barr, Birmingham, McLeod began his career at Derby County in 2002. He made his debut on 28 September 2002, at the age of seventeen, just three weeks before his eighteenth birthday, in a 1–0 win over Ipswich Town during which he received a yellow card. Weeks later on 30 October 2002, he scored his first goal in a 2–1 win over Sheffield United and scored against the other Sheffield team, Sheffield Wednesday, the following week in a 3–1 win. After getting his chance in the first team, McLeod signed a two-year deal. However the following season, McLeod suffered a knee cartilage injury in training, and was out for 6 weeks following surgery, losing his first team place as a result. In the transfer window, McLeod was linked with a move to Russian and Ukrainian clubs, like Shinnik Yaroslavl. McLeod was close to joining Shinnik Yaroslavl and Metalurh Donetsk, with the moves reportedly around the £300,000 mark. However, McLeod eventually rejected the moves and stayed at Derby County, to fight for his place in the first team. But he spent time on loan at First Division club Sheffield United, making seven appearances. During his career at Derby, McLeod scored four goals in 41 appearances.

=== Milton Keynes Dons ===
At the beginning of the 2004–05 season he joined newly relegated League One club Milton Keynes Dons for a reported fee of £150,000. In the opening game of the season, he scored in his MK Dons debut in a 1–1 draw against Barnsley. On 25 September 2004, he received a red card for the first time of his career and also scored a brace in a 4–2 win over Hartlepool United. At the end of the season, he had scored 18 goals in a total of 48 appearances in an excellent start at MK Dons. At the start of his second season at MK Dons, he signed a two-year deal.

In early March 2007, the Football League declared him League Two player of the year and he finished that season as League Two's joint top scorer despite missing several games due to injuries and suspensions. McLeod was named in the PFA Team of the Year for League Two for the 2006–07 season. At the end of the season, McLeod was linked with clubs in Championship, having handed in a transfer request.

=== Charlton Athletic ===
McLeod joined Charlton for a fee of £1.1 million, which could rise to £1.55 million, on a four-year contract on 9 August 2007. He scored just one goal in 18 appearances for the Addicks before he joined Colchester United on loan on 29 February 2008 for one month. It was later revealed that Charlton had turned down approaches from League One clubs Crewe Alexandra and Huddersfield Town. However, his loan spell was cut short after he suffered a knee injury in the game against Plymouth Argyle on 4 March 2008, ruling him out for the remainder of the 2007–08 season. His time at Charlton had not gone as planned and he couldn't reproduce his form at MK Dons.

==== Millwall ====
McLeod joined Millwall on loan during the January transfer window in 2009 in an attempt to overcome the injury problems which had plagued his Charlton career, scoring two goals in five appearances. However, after falling out with manager Kenny Jackett, McLeod returned to Charlton.

==== Peterborough United ====
On 9 January 2010, McLeod joined Championship club Peterborough United on loan until the end of the season. McLeod made his Peterborough debut in a 2–1 loss against Sheffield Wednesday on 23 January 2010. After making three more appearances, he fell out of favour with manager Mark Cooper, due to a discipline issue. Even worse, McLeod suffered a meniscus problem, ruling him out for six to eight weeks. As a result of his injury, he returned to Charlton.

=== Barnet ===
McLeod left Charlton Athletic after his contract was cancelled in July 2010. After unsuccessful trials over the summer of 2010 with Brentford and Southend United, McLeod signed a one-year contract with Barnet on 29 September 2010. His penalty against Port Vale on the final day of the 2010–11 season saved the club from relegation out of the Football League. On 18 May 2011, he signed for another year at Barnet.

McLeod had a great start to the 2011–12 League Two season. He scored both goals as Barnet twice came from behind to draw 2–2 at home with then league leaders Gillingham. He then went on to score a penalty in an away 2–2 at Rotherham United. His good league form continued, as he scored two more goals in Barnet's 4–2 away defeat to Bradford City. He scored another penalty in Barnet's 3–1 win at Colchester United in the Football League Trophy First Round. He was subsequently sent off during the same game for two bookable offences. McLeod returned to the first team after a one match ban and marked his return with a goal in a 3–1 defeat at Crewe Alexandra. He then scored another goal in Barnet's 2–0 home victory over struggling. McLeod netted in six straight league games for Barnet, scoring seven goals in the process. Due to his goalscoring form, McLeod was linked with clubs like Crawley Town in the transfer windows during the season. But McLeod rejected the transfer speculation, insisting he wanted to concentrate on his career at Barnet.

In April, McLeod was named in the PFA Team of the Year for League Two for the 2011–12 season. On 21 May 2012, he was out of contract and was subsequently released. After his release from Barnet, McLeod explained that he left the club for a new challenge with a team that could gain promotion rather than helping to avoid relegation.

=== Portsmouth ===
In July, McLeod went on trial at League One relegated club Portsmouth, having previously stated he is on the verge of joining a new club but the move was never finalised. After playing in series of friendlies, on 16 August 2012, McLeod agreed to join Portsmouth on a short-term deal. He scored on his league debut in a 1–1 draw against Bournemouth. His second goal came in a 3–0 away win against Crawley Town on 9 September. While at Portsmouth, McLeod's performance was praised by Guy Whittingham, due to his work rate.

McLeod scored 11 goals in 27 games before leaving the club by mutual consent at the end of December 2012. This is explained when caretaker manager Whittingham left him out of the squad, citing tactical reason in a 2–1 loss against Crawley Town, which could have been his last appearance. During Portsmouth's first half in the league, McLeod was the club's top scorer.

=== Milton Keynes Dons (second spell) ===
On 3 January 2013 McLeod signed for Milton Keynes Dons on a free transfer on an 18-month contract, having been linked a move back to his former club after his release. Mcleod described his return to MK Dons as a dream come true. He scored his first goal upon his return against Doncaster Rovers in a 3–0 win.

On 28 November 2013, McLeod joined Northampton Town until 4 January 2014 but it was cut short due to an injury suffered in a 1–0 defeat in the hands of Burton Albion on Boxing Day 2013.

=== Later career ===
Following his release from MK Dons, on 25 June 2014, McLeod signed a two-year deal with Crawley Town on a free transfer.

On 22 August 2015, McLeod joined Notts County for an undisclosed six-figure sum on a two-year contract. On 25 August 2016, McLeod left Notts County by mutual consent having scored 10 goals in 41 appearances for the club.

Following the mutual termination of his contract at Notts County, McLeod joined fellow League Two club Yeovil Town until the end of the season. He scored his first goal for Yeovil in an EFL Trophy tie against Portsmouth on 30 August 2016. On 10 November 2016, after making only six appearances for Yeovil, McLeod left the club after his contract was terminated by mutual consent for personal reasons.

On 24 November 2016, McLeod joined Northern Premier League club Corby Town.

On 6 January 2017, McLeod joined Wrexham. He was released by the club at the end of the 2016–17 season.

On 4 July 2017, McLeod announced his retirement from professional football whilst also taking up a new role as a Business Sales Executive with his former club Milton Keynes Dons. At the time of taking up his new position, McLeod was still the club's all-time leading goalscorer.

McLeod came out of retirement in November 2018 to sign for Southern League club Kempston Rovers. He retired again in January 2020 due to a recurring injury.

== International career ==
In February 2006, he was selected for the England national under-21 football team squad. He played one game for the under-21s, as a 73rd minute substitute versus Norway's U21 team, on 28 February 2006, at the Madejski Stadium, Reading, Berkshire. England won the game 3–1.

== Career statistics ==
As of match played 11 January 2020.

Appearances and goals by club, season and competition
Club	Season	League			FA Cup		League Cup		Other		Total	
Club	Season	Division	Apps	Goals	Apps	Goals	Apps	Goals	Apps	Goals	Apps	Goals
Derby County	2002–03	First Division	29	3	0	0	1	0	—		30	3
Derby County	2003–04	First Division	10	1	0	0	1	0	—		11	1
Derby County	Total		39	4	0	0	2	0	—		41	4
Sheffield United (loan)	2003–04	First Division	7	0	—		—		—		7	0
Milton Keynes Dons	2004–05	League One	43	16	3	0	2	2	0	0	48	18
Milton Keynes Dons	2005–06	League One	39	17	4	1	1	0	2 (Note: Appearance(s) in EFL Trophy)	0	46	18
Milton Keynes Dons	2006–07	League Two	34	21	2	2	2	1	3 (Note: Two appearances in League Two play-offs and one appearance in EFL Trophy)	0	41	24
Milton Keynes Dons	Total		116	54	9	3	5	3	5	0	135	60
Charlton Athletic	2007–08	Championship	18	1	2	0	3	0	—		23	1
Charlton Athletic	2008–09	Championship	2	0	—		0	0	—		2	0
Charlton Athletic	2009–10	League One	11	2	1	0	1	0	1	1	14	3
Charlton Athletic	Total		31	3	3	0	4	0	1	1	39	4
Colchester United (loan)	2007–08	Championship	2	0	—		—		—		2	0
Millwall (loan)	2008–09	League One	7	2	1	0	—		—		8	2
Peterborough United (loan)	2009–10	Championship	4	0	—		—		—		4	0
Barnet	2010–11	League Two	29	14	1	0	0	0	0	0	30	14
Barnet	2011–12	League Two	44	18	1	1	2	0	6	3	53	22
Barnet	Total		73	32	2	1	2	0	6	3	83	36
Portsmouth	2012–13	League One	24	10	1	0	0	0	2	1	27	11
Milton Keynes Dons	2012–13	League One	13	1	—		—		—		13	1
Milton Keynes Dons	2013–14	League One	36	7	1	2	2	1	1	0	40	10
Milton Keynes Dons	Total		49	8	1	2	2	1	1	0	53	11
Northampton Town (loan)	2013–14	League Two	4	1	—		—		—		4	1
Crawley Town	2014–15	League One	42	19	1	0	2	1	2	1	47	21
Notts County	2015–16	League Two	37	9	1	0	1	0	2	1	41	10
Yeovil Town	2016–17	League Two	4	0	0	0	0	0	2	1	6	1
Corby Town	2016–17	NPL Premier Division	1	0	0	0	—		0	0	1	0
Wrexham	2016–17	National League	15	1	0	0	—		0	0	15	1
Kempston Rovers	2018–19	Southern D1 Central	16	7	0	0	—		0	0	16	7
Kempston Rovers	2019–20	Southern D1 Central	20	8	2	0	—		1 (Note: Appearance in FA Trophy)	0	23	8
Kempston Rovers	Total		36	15	2	0	—		1	0	39	15
Career total			492	158	21	6	18	5	22	8	552	177

== Honours ==
Individual

- Milton Keynes Dons Player of the Year: 2005–06
- Football League Two Player of the Year: 2006–07
- PFA Team of the Year: 2006–07 League Two, 2011–12 League Two
- Barnet Player of the Year: 2011–12
- Football League One Player of the Month: February 2015
