= Mauro Vilhete =

Santomean footballer (born 1993)

Personal information
- Full name: Mauro Alexandre da Silva Vilhete
- Date of birth: 10 May 1993 (age 33)
- Place of birth: Rio de Mouro, Portugal
- Height: 1.67 m (5 ft 5 1/2 in)
- Positions: Defender; midfielder

Team information
- Current team: Maidenhead United
- Number: 17

Youth career
- 2009–2010: Barnet

Senior career*
| Years | Team | Apps | (Gls) |
| 2009–2020 | Barnet | 199 | (19) |
| 2011 | → Hendon (loan) | 6 | (0) |
| 2012 | → Boreham Wood (loan) | 10 | (5) |
| 2012–2013 | → Boreham Wood (loan) | 14 | (2) |
| 2015 | → Boreham Wood (loan) | 9 | (1) |
| 2020–2021 | Wingate & Finchley | 7 | (1) |
| 2021 | Hampton & Richmond Borough | 3 | (1) |
| 2021–2023 | Dagenham & Redbridge | 65 | (8) |
| 2023 | Hayes & Yeading United | 2 | (0) |
| 2023–2024 | Southend United | 13 | (0) |
| 2024 | Hornchurch | 11 | (3) |
| 2024–2025 | Hampton & Richmond Borough | 36 | (11) |
| 2025–2026 | Hemel Hempstead Town | 40 | (5) |
| 2026 | Gosport Borough | 8 | (1) |
| 2026– | Maidenhead United | 1 | (0) |

International career^{‡}
| 2023– | São Tomé and Príncipe | 8 | (0) |
- * Club domestic league appearances and goals as of 18:02, 7 November 2026 (UTC) ‡ National team caps and goals as of 14:22, 7 November 2026 (UTC)

Mauro Alexandre da Silva Vilhete (born 10 May 1993) is a professional footballer who plays as a midfielder. He plays for Maidenhead United. Born in Portugal, he plays for the São Tomé and Príncipe national team.

== Career ==
=== Club ===
Born in Rio de Mouro, Sintra, Portugal, Vilhete moved to Barnet, England at a young age. He attended The Ravenscroft School, where he was tasked with analysing data from Barnet F.C. matches. He joined Barnet's youth team in 2009 after turning down an offer of a scholarship from Aston Villa. Following a series of injuries to first-team regulars, manager Ian Hendon called him into the first-team squad in November 2009, however he only appeared on the bench during this time. In April 2010, he signed a two-year professional contract with the Bees. He made his debut on 1 May 2010 in a 2–0 away defeat to Grimsby Town aged 16, becoming Barnet's youngest ever Football League player, breaking the record of 17 years and 46 days set by Kofi Lockhart-Adams against Cheltenham Town on 24 November 2009, before losing the record to Mathew Stevens on 6 September 2014.

Vilhete scored his first goal for Barnet in October 2010 against Southend United in the Football League Trophy. He agreed a new contract with the club in March 2011. Vilhete joined Hendon on a one-month loan on 4 November 2011, where he made six appearances. He then joined Boreham Wood on another one-month loan on 17 February 2012, and on 20 March agreed a loan until the end of the season with Boreham Wood.

On 31 August 2012, Vilhete joined Boreham Wood on loan again until January 2013.

On 25 April 2015, Vilhete scored both goals in a 2–0 win over Gateshead to secure the Conference title for Barnet and promotion back to League Two. He was also awarded the Conference Player of the Month award for April.

Vilhete was loaned to Boreham Wood for a third time on 30 October 2015. He scored a day later, in a 2–3 home defeat against Gateshead.

Martin Allen made Vilhete available on a free transfer at the end of the 2015-16 season, but no move materialised and he worked his way back into first-team contention.

In the 2019-20 season, he made his 200th appearance for the Bees and scored in the National League playoffs against Yeovil Town. He left the club at the end of the season, having scored 25 goals in 235 games across eleven seasons.

On 19 September 2020, Vilhete joined Isthmian League side Wingate & Finchley. In January 2021, he joined Hampton & Richmond Borough on dual registration basis.

On 12 March 2021, Vilhete signed for National League side Dagenham & Redbridge. He spent two years with the club before being released in the summer of 2023.

Vilhete joined Hayes & Yeading United on 9 September 2023. Ten days later he joined Southend United on dual registration, making a brief substitute appearance against Maidenhead United the same day. On 9 February 2024, Southend announced that they had terminated his dual-registration contract and he had left the club. Later that day, he signed for Hornchurch. ending up departing the club in the summer.

In May 2025, Vilhete joined National League South side Hemel Hempstead Town, as part of the team that reached the playoffs at the end of the season.

In September 2026, he joined Gosport Borough, for whom he made eight appearances.

Vilhete signed for Maidenhead United in November 2026.

=== International career ===
Vilhete was born in Portugal to Santomean parents, and moved to England at a young age. In November 2010, Vilhete said he wanted to play international football for either England or Portugal, but said "it would probably be Portugal in the end". In March 2011, he was called up for a training camp with the Portugal national under-18 football team.

In November 2023, he was called up by São Tomé and Príncipe for 2026 FIFA World Cup qualification.

=== Style of play ===
Vilhete has played on both the left and right sides as a full-back and winger, and has also played central midfield for Barnet. He has also played as a forward. He has been described as a utility player.

== Career statistics ==
=== Club ===
As of 7 November 2026

Appearances and goals by club, season and competition
| Club | Season | League | | | FA Cup | | League Cup | | Other | | Total | |
| Club | Season | Division | Apps | Goals | Apps | Goals | Apps | Goals | Apps | Goals | Apps | Goals |
|---|---|---|---|---|---|---|---|---|---|---|---|---|
| Barnet | 2009–10 | League Two | 2 | 0 | 0 | 0 | 0 | 0 | 0 | 0 | 2 | 0 |
| Barnet | 2010–11 | League Two | 20 | 0 | 1 | 0 | 0 | 0 | 5 (Note: One appearance and one goal in Football League Trophy, four appearances and three goals in Herts Senior Cup) | 4 | 26 | 4 |
| Barnet | 2011–12 | League Two | 3 | 0 | 0 | 0 | 0 | 0 | 2 (Note: One appearance in Football League Trophy, one appearance in Herts Senior Cup) | 0 | 5 | 0 |
| Barnet | 2012–13 | League Two | 5 | 0 | — | | 0 | 0 | 0 | 0 | 5 | 0 |
| Barnet | 2013–14 | Conference Premier | 30 | 4 | 2 | 0 | — | | 1 (Note: Appearances in FA Trophy) | 0 | 33 | 4 |
| Barnet | 2014–15 | Conference Premier | 30 | 5 | 2 | 0 | — | | 1 | 0 | 33 | 5 |
| Barnet | 2015–16 | League Two | 15 | 0 | — | | 2 | 0 | 0 | 0 | 17 | 0 |
| Barnet | 2016–17 | League Two | 40 | 3 | 1 | 0 | 0 | 0 | 2 (Note: Appearances in EFL Trophy) | 0 | 43 | 3 |
| Barnet | 2017–18 | League Two | 32 | 3 | 1 | 0 | 2 | 1 | 4 (Note: Three appearances in EFL Trophy, one appearance in Middlesex Senior Cup) | 0 | 39 | 4 |
| Barnet | 2018–19 | National League | 1 | 1 | 0 | 0 | — | | 0 | 0 | 1 | 1 |
| Barnet | 2019–20 | National League | 21 | 3 | 2 | 0 | — | | 8 (Note: Five appearances in FA Trophy, two appearances and one goal in National League play-offs, one appearance in Middlesex Senior Cup) | 1 | 31 | 4 |
| Barnet | Total | | 199 | 19 | 9 | 0 | 4 | 1 | 23 | 5 | 235 | 25 |
| Hendon (loan) | 2011–12 | Isthmian League Premier Division | 6 | 0 | — | | — | | — | | 6 | 0 |
| Boreham Wood (loan) | 2011–12 | Conference South | 10 | 5 | — | | — | | — | | 10 | 5 |
| Boreham Wood (loan) | 2012–13 | Conference South | 14 | 2 | 3 | 1 | — | | 3 | 1 | 20 | 4 |
| Boreham Wood (loan) | 2015–16 | National League | 9 | 1 | 2 | 0 | — | | 1 | 0 | 12 | 1 |
| Boreham Wood (loan) | Total | | 39 | 8 | 5 | 1 | — | | 4 | 1 | 48 | 10 |
| Wingate & Finchley | 2020–21 | Isthmian League Premier Division | 7 | 1 | 0 | 0 | — | | 2 | 0 | 9 | 1 |
| Hampton & Richmond Borough | 2020–21 | National League South | 3 | 1 | — | | — | | — | | 3 | 1 |
| Dagenham & Redbridge | 2020–21 | National League | 14 | 1 | — | | — | | — | | 13 | 1 |
| Dagenham & Redbridge | 2021–22 | National League | 37 | 4 | 1 | 0 | — | | 1 | 0 | 39 | 4 |
| Dagenham & Redbridge | 2022–23 | National League | 14 | 3 | 0 | 0 | — | | 0 | 0 | 14 | 3 |
| Dagenham & Redbridge | Total | | 65 | 8 | 1 | 0 | — | | 1 | 0 | 67 | 8 |
| Hayes & Yeading United | 2023–24 | SFL Premier Division South | 2 | 0 | 1 | 0 | — | | 0 | 0 | 3 | 0 |
| Southend United | 2023–24 | National League | 13 | 0 | — | | — | | 1 | 0 | 14 | 0 |
| Hornchurch | 2023–24 | Isthmian League Premier Division | 11 | 3 | 0 | 0 | — | | 0 | 0 | 11 | 3 |
| Hampton & Richmond Borough | 2024–25 | National League South | 36 | 11 | 1 | 0 | — | | 3 | 1 | 40 | 12 |
| Hemel Hempstead Town | 2025–26 | National League South | 36 | 5 | 1 | 0 | — | | 3 (Note: Two appearances in FA Trophy, one appearance in National League South playoffs) | 0 | 40 | 5 |
| Hemel Hempstead Town | 2026–27 | National League South | 4 | 0 | 0 | 0 | — | | 0 | 0 | 4 | 0 |
| Hemel Hempstead Town | Total | | 40 | 5 | 1 | 0 | — | | 3 | 0 | 44 | 5 |
| Gosport Borough | 2026–27 | SFL Premier Division South | 8 | 1 | 0 | 0 | — | | 0 | 0 | 8 | 1 |
| Maidenhead United | 2026–27 | National League South | 1 | 0 | 0 | 0 | — | | 0 | 0 | 1 | 0 |
| Career total | | | 423 | 57 | 18 | 1 | 4 | 1 | 37 | 7 | 482 | 66 |

=== International ===
As of match played 13 October 2025

Appearances and goals by national team and year
| National team | Year | Apps | Goals |
|---|---|---|---|
| São Tomé and Príncipe | 2023 | 1 | 0 |
| São Tomé and Príncipe | 2024 | 4 | 0 |
| São Tomé and Príncipe | 2025 | 3 | 0 |
| Total | | 8 | 0 |

== Honours ==
Barnet

- Conference Premier
  - Champions: 2014–15
