= Charlie Stimson =

English footballer (born 1992)

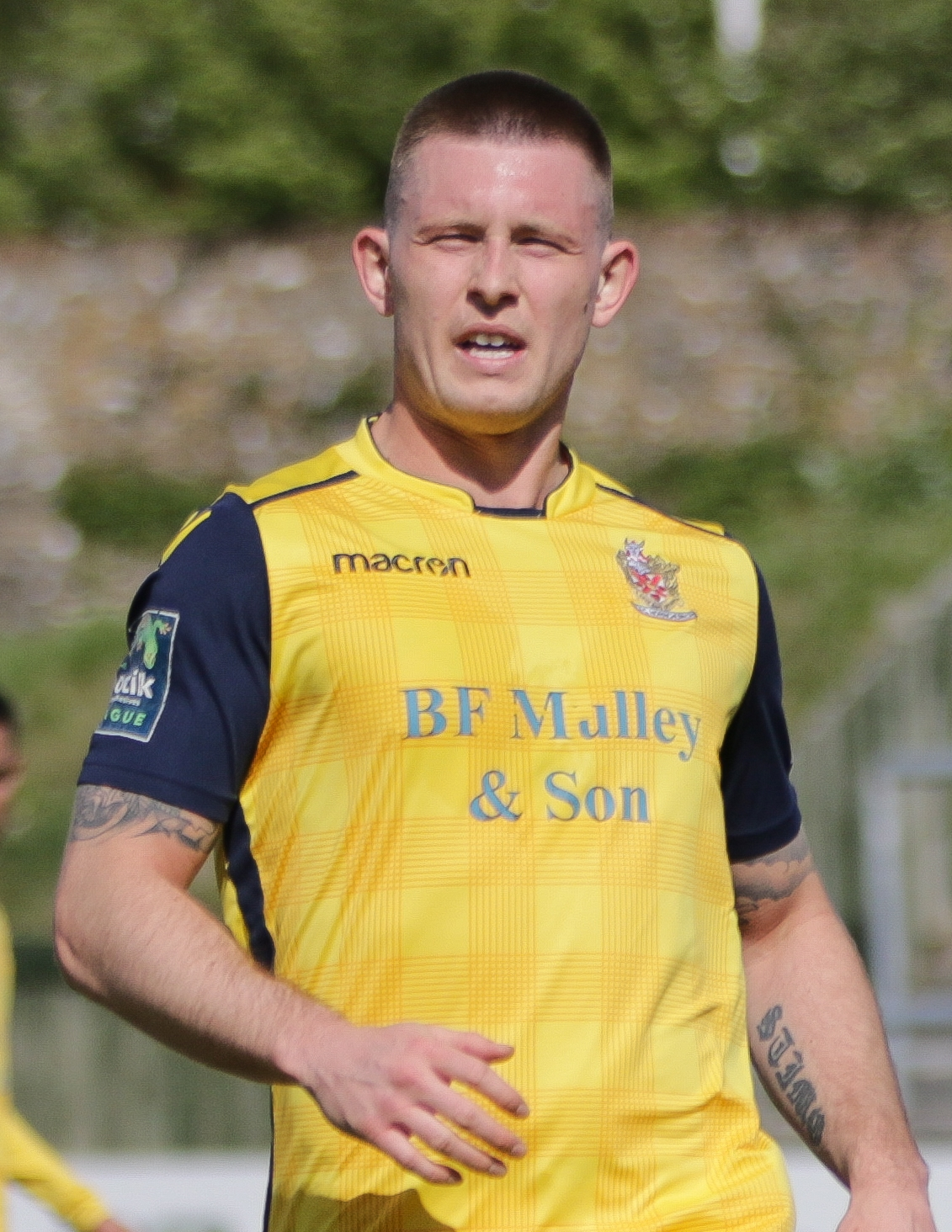
- Stimson in 2019

Personal information
- Full name: Charlie Thomas Frederick Stimson
- Date of birth: 1 March 1992 (age 34)
- Place of birth: Newcastle upon Tyne, England
- Position: Forward

Team information
- Current team: Canvey Island

Youth career
- Tottenham Hotspur
- Gillingham

Senior career*
Years	Team	Apps	(Gls)
2008–2010	Gillingham	0	(0)
2009	→ Redbridge (loan)	2	(0)
2010	→ Maidstone United (loan)	6	(0)
2010–2011	Barnet	6	(0)
2011	Concord Rangers	2	(0)
2011–2012	Tooting & Mitcham United	28	(8)
2012–2018	Thurrock	190	(60)
2018	Waltham Abbey	6	(4)
2018–2023	Hornchurch	128	(22)
2023–2024	Grays Athletic	29	(15)
2024–2025	Redbridge	10	(3)
2024–2025	Heybridge Swifts	20	(6)
2025–2026	Canvey Island	16	(2)
2026–	Grays Athletic	0	(0)
- * Club domestic league appearances and goals as of 22 January 2026

Charlie Thomas Frederick Stimson (born 1 March 1992) is an English footballer, who plays as a forward for Isthmian League North Division club Grays Athletic.

== Career ==
Stimson played under his father Mark at Gillingham, who then signed him for his new club Barnet. Stimson made his Barnet debut on 25 September 2010 in their 2–2 draw against Morecambe. He left Barnet at the end of the 2010–11 season. After playing for Concord Rangers and Tooting & Mitcham United in the 2011–12 season, he was signed by his father again at Thurrock for the 2012–13 season. After six years with the club, Stimson followed his father to Waltham Abbey in summer 2018 after Thurrock folded, and then to AFC Hornchurch later that year. In June 2023, he joined Grays Athletic. In June 2025, he joined Canvey Island.

== Personal life ==
Stimson's father, Mark is a former professional footballer and current manager, who has managed Charlie at Gillingham, Barnet, Thurrock, Waltham Abbey, Hornchurch and Grays Athletic. Stimson went to school with former Norwich City defender George Francomb.

== Honours ==
Hornchurch

- FA Trophy: 2020–21
