= Glen Southam =

English footballer

Personal information
- Full name: Glen Andrew James Southam
- Date of birth: 10 June 1980 (age 46)
- Place of birth: Enfield, England
- Height: 5 ft 7 in (1.70 m)
- Position: Midfielder

Youth career
- Fulham
- Tottenham Hotspur

Senior career*
Years	Team	Apps	(Gls)
1999–2000	Enfield	5	(0)
2000–2004	Bishop's Stortford	124	(27)
2001–2002	→ Boreham Wood (loan)	5	(0)
2004–2009	Dagenham & Redbridge	201	(25)
2009	Hereford United	6	(0)
2009–2010	Bishop's Stortford	13	(2)
2010	Histon	19	(2)
2010–2011	Barnet	34	(1)
2011–2012	Dover Athletic	34	(1)
2012–2014	Eastleigh	79	(7)
2014	Chelmsford City	6	(2)
2014–2015	Sutton United	33	(1)
2015	Farnborough	1	(0)
2015–2016	Basingstoke Town	19	(1)
2016–2017	Whitehawk	29	(5)
2017–2018	Farnborough	11	(2)
2018	East Thurrock United	1	(0)
Total		620	(76)

International career
2004–2007	England C	13	(2)
Medal record
Dagenham & Redbridge
Winner	Football Conference	2007
- * Club domestic league appearances and goals as of 18:50, 7 October 2017 (UTC)

Glen Andrew James Southam (born 10 June 1980) is an English former semi-professional footballer.

At international level, he has represented the England semi-professional side on 13 occasions, scoring two goals.

== Career ==
Southam began his career as a non-contract player at Fulham whilst also playing for Enfield, and also in Sunday league football for Edmonton Rovers. He signed for Bishop's Stortford for the 1999–2000 season and during his time at the club, he was awarded the Player of the Season award three times in 2000–01, 2002–03 and 2003–04. He then suffered a serious injury and was loaned to Boreham Wood to aid his recovery.

He moved to Dagenham & Redbridge in May 2004 for a £20,000 fee – a club record for Bishop's Stortford – and was part of their side that won promotion to the Football League in 2007. He made his Football League debut on 11 August 2007, in Dagenham's first ever Football League game, a 1–0 defeat away to Stockport County.

On 11 May 2009, Southam was released by Dagenham and Redbridge after agreeing a mutual departure with manager John Still.

Southam signed for League Two side Hereford United on 22 June 2009, he made six league appearances before leaving by mutual consent on 23 October, returning to former club Bishop's Stortford.

On deadline day in the January 2010 transfer window, he joined Conference National club Histon on an 18-month contract. However, amidst financial trouble, Southam agreed a mutual termination of his contract at Histon at the end of the 2009–10 season. Southam joined Barnet in June 2010. He made his debut on the opening day of the 2010–11 season in a 2–1 loss at Chesterfield and scored his first goal for the club from the penalty spot in a 2–2 draw at Morecambe on 25 September 2010. He left Barnet at the end of the 2010–11 season.

In August 2011, he joined Dover Athletic on a one-year contract. At the end of his contract in May 2012, Southam left Dover, signing for fellow Conference South side Eastleigh.

After skippering the Spitfires to promotion, Southam left Eastleigh on 3 July 2014 and joined Conference South side Chelmsford City a week later, before signing for Basingstoke Town on dual registration terms with Farnborough. Southam was released by Basingstoke Town in April 2016, signing for Brighton-based National League South side Whitehawk in September 2016, to play under his former manager at Eastleigh, Richard Hill Southam joined Farnborough for the 2017–18 season.

== International career ==
Southam made 13 appearances for England C between 2004 and 2007, including playing for England in the Home Nations Non-League International Tournaments in both 2004 and 2007, all located at several Scottish Highland Football League grounds across the North of Scotland.

== Honours ==
Dagenham & Redbridge

- Conference National: 2006–07

Eastleigh

- Conference South: 2013–2014
