= Jordan Parkes =

English footballer (born 1989)

Personal information
- Full name: Jordan David Parkes
- Date of birth: 26 July 1989 (age 37)
- Place of birth: Hemel Hempstead, England
- Height: 5 ft 11 in (1.80 m)
- Position: Midfielder

Youth career
- 2005–2006: Watford

Senior career*
Years	Team	Apps	(Gls)
2006–2010	Watford	1	(0)
2008	→ Brentford (loan)	1	(0)
2008	→ Barnet (loan)	10	(0)
2008–2009	→ Stevenage Borough (loan)	0	(0)
2010–2012	Barnet	51	(1)
2012	→ Farnborough (loan)	3	(0)
2012	Chelmsford City	6	(0)
2012–2015	Hemel Hempstead Town	112	(42)
2015–2016	Ebbsfleet United	39	(12)
2016–2019	Hemel Hempstead Town	107	(40)
2019	Billericay Town	14	(2)
2019–2023	Kings Langley	29	(12)

International career^{‡}
2007	England U18	1	(0)
2009	England U20	1	(0)

Managerial career
- 2023–2025: Kings Langley
- * Club domestic league appearances and goals as of 19:05, 13 February 2020 (UTC) ‡ National team caps and goals as of 01:15, 14 November 2019 (UTC)

Jordan David Parkes (born 26 July 1989) is an English football midfielder.

== Playing career ==
Parkes left Parmiter's School in Garston, Hertfordshire at sixteen to pursue a football career at Watford. His debut came in a 2006 League Cup second round tie against Accrington Stanley, in which he scored a penalty in the shootout, won 6–5 by Watford.

Parkes signed his first professional contract with Watford on 1 February 2007. In March 2007, Parkes was called up to the England under-18 squad by manager Brian Eastick, making his debut in the 4–1 win against Holland. He has subsequently been called up by England under-19's.

In the 2007–08 season Parkes was loaned to League Two sides Brentford and Barnet . He made his league debut for Watford on 30 August 2008 against Ipswich Town, replacing the injured Mat Sadler. In November of that year he captained Watford U20s away to Inter Milan, against a side that included Hernan Crespo, Adriano, Walter Samuel and Olivier Dacourt.

On 29 July 2009, Parkes scored twice in a 4–1 win for a strong Watford side against St Albans City. In September 2009, he was selected for the England national under-20 football team and played in the 2009 FIFA U-20 World Cup in Egypt against Uzbekistan, setting up England's first goal in the competition for 12 years.

On 21 June 2010, Parkes was released from his contract with Watford. He subsequently joined Barnet. He went on to make 51 appearances and left in May 2012, with the expiry of his contract. In August 2012 he joined Chelmsford City and signed a contract at Melbourne Park, however in October 2012 he left by mutual consent and joined his hometown club Hemel Hempstead Town moving into midfield where he made 40 appearances in the 2012–13 season, scoring 12 goals (6 in the league) and captaining the side to the play-off finals. In 2013–14 he captained Hemel Hempstead to the Southern Premier Division League title and secured promotion into the Conference South, making 51 appearances in all competitions, scoring 24 goals (16 in the league) and being named in the Southern Premier League Team of the Year.

In 2014-15 Parkes captained Hemel Hempstead to their highest league position of 69th in the Conference South, winning 2 Cup competitions and scoring 30 goals in 56 appearances. He finished third in the Conference South goal scorers table with 21 and won the Players Player, Supporters Player & Managers Player of the Year Awards, as well as the Gazette player of the year. He was also named in the Conference South Team of the Year and received the prestigious Conference South Player of the Year Trophy at The Conference Annual Awards in June 2015.

In 2015, after three years at Hemel Hempstead, Parkes joined fellow Conference South side Ebbsfleet United. for an undisclosed fee. Parkes re-joined Hemel for the 2016–17 season, becoming Hemel Hempstead FC all-time top goal scorer with 109 goals.

In May 2019, Parked joined Billericay Town.

Parkes joined Southern League Premier Division Central side Kings Langley on 12 November 2019 as a player-coach.

== Career statistics ==
As of match played 8 February 2020.

Appearances and goals by club, season and competition
Club	Season	League			FA Cup		League Cup		Other		Total	
Club	Season	Division	Apps	Goals	Apps	Goals	Apps	Goals	Apps	Goals	Apps	Goals
Watford	2006–07	Premier League	0	0	0	0	1	0	—		1	0
Watford	2007–08	Championship	0	0	0	0	2	0	0	0	2	0
Watford	2008–09	Championship	1	0	0	0	1	0	—		2	0
Watford	Total		1	0	0	0	4	0	0	0	5	0
Brentford (loan)	2007–08	League Two	1	0	—		—		—		1	0
Barnet (loan)	2007–08	League Two	10	0	—		—		—		10	0
Stevenage Borough (loan)	2008–09	Conference Premier	0	0	—		—		1 (Note: Appearance in Conference League Cup)	0	1	0
Barnet	2010–11	League Two	40	1	1	0	1	0	1 (Note: Appearances in Football League Trophy)	0	43	1
Barnet	2011–12	League Two	11	0	1	0	2	0	2	0	16	0
Barnet	Total		51	1	2	0	3	0	3	0	59	1
Farnborough	2011–12	Conference South	3	0	—		—		—		3	0
Chelmsford City	2012–13	Conference South	6	0	1	0	—		—		7	0
Hemel Hempstead Town	2012–13	SFL Premier Division	31	6	0	0		(Note: Appearances in Southern League Premier Division play-offs)	5	6	36	12
Hemel Hempstead Town	2013–14	SFL Premier Division	42	16	6	2	—		3 (Note: Appearances in FA Trophy) +2	2	53	20
Hemel Hempstead Town	2014–15	Conference South	39	20	5	1	—		4+4	2	48	23
Hemel Hempstead Town	Total		112	42	11	3	—		18	10	141	55
Ebbsfleet United	2015–16	National League South	36	12	2	0	—		3 (Note: Two appearances in National League South play-offs, one in FA Trophy)	0	41	12
Ebbsfleet United	2016–17	National League South	1	0	0	0	—		0	0	1	0
Ebbsfleet United	Total		37	12	2	0	—		3	0	42	12
Hemel Hempstead Town	2016–17	National League South	23	12	2	0	—		0	0	25	12
Hemel Hempstead Town	2017–18	National League South	42	15	3	1	—		3	2	48	18
Hemel Hempstead Town	2018–19	National League South	42	13	2	1	—		5	1	47	15
Hemel Hempstead Town	Total		107	40	7	2	—		8	3	122	45
Billericay Town	2019–20	National League South	14	2	3	2	—		0	0	17	4
Kings Langley	2019–20	SFL Premier Division Central	13	7	0	0	—		0	0	13	7
Career Total			355	103	26	7	7	0	32	13	420	123

== Honours ==
Individual

- National League South Team of the Year: 2018–19
