= Kwame Adjeman-Pamboe =

American soccer player

Personal information
- Full name: Kwame Adjeman-Pamboe
- Date of birth: October 24, 1987 (age 39)
- Place of birth: London, England
- Height: 1.73 m (5 ft 8 in)
- Position: Winger

College career
Years	Team	Apps	(Gls)
2005–2006	Saint Francis Red Flash		
2007–2008	George Mason Patriots	38	(11)

Senior career*
Years	Team	Apps	(Gls)
2009	FC Viikingit	9	(4)
2010	FC Tampa Bay	21	(1)
2011	Barnet	1	(0)
2011–2012	Agrotikos Asteras	19	(4)
2013	Panachaiki	22	(3)
2013–2014	El Qanah	19	(4)
2014–2016	Al-Gaish	31	(5)
2017	Yalova	12	(6)
2018	Doğan Türk Birliği	15	(5)
2018–2020	Al-Salt		
- * Club domestic league appearances and goals as of 19:24, 19 January 2021 (UTC)

Kwame Adjeman-Pamboe (born 24 October 1987), is an English/American professional soccer player who plays as a winger.

== Club career ==
=== Youth and college ===
Adjeman-Pamboe grew up in Bowie, Maryland, attended Eleanor Roosevelt High School, played club soccer for the Bethesda Raptors and Columbia United, and played two years of college soccer at Saint Francis University before transferring to George Mason University as a junior. In his senior season at George Mason he was named the Most Outstanding Player at the CAA Men's Soccer Championship, was a CAA All-Tournament Team selection, a First-Team NSCAA All-South Atlantic Region selection, and a First-Team All-CAA selection.

=== Professional ===
Adjeman-Pamboe was selected in the 2009 MLS SuperDraft (28th overall) by Colorado Rapids, but after trialling with them was not offered a contract by the club. Adjeman-Pamboe instead signed with Finnish club Viikingit in August 2009 and spent one year with the team, scoring 4 goals in 9 Ykkönen appearances.

Adjeman-Pamboe returned to the United States in 2010, and signed the FC Tampa Bay of the USSF Division 2 Professional League in January.

In February 2011, he returned to his country of birth, England, and signed for Barnet. On February 26, 2011, Kwame made his debut coming off the bench in added time against Lincoln City replacing Sam Deering. He left Barnet at the end of the 2010-11 season.

In Summer 2011, Adjeman-Pamboe joined Agrotikos. He scored his first goal for Agrotikos against Kallithea, with his team winning 1–0. In January 2013, he joined Panachaiki, leaving at the end of the season.

In December 2013, he joined El Qanah in the Egyptian Premier League, scoring on his debut against Ismaily on December 25, in a 1–2 loss. He scored his second goal in a 1–1 draw against Wadi Degla on January 29, 2014.

In November 2018, he joined Jordanian Pro League side Al-Salt, becoming the first English footballer to play in Jordan.
