= Rossi Jarvis =

English footballer

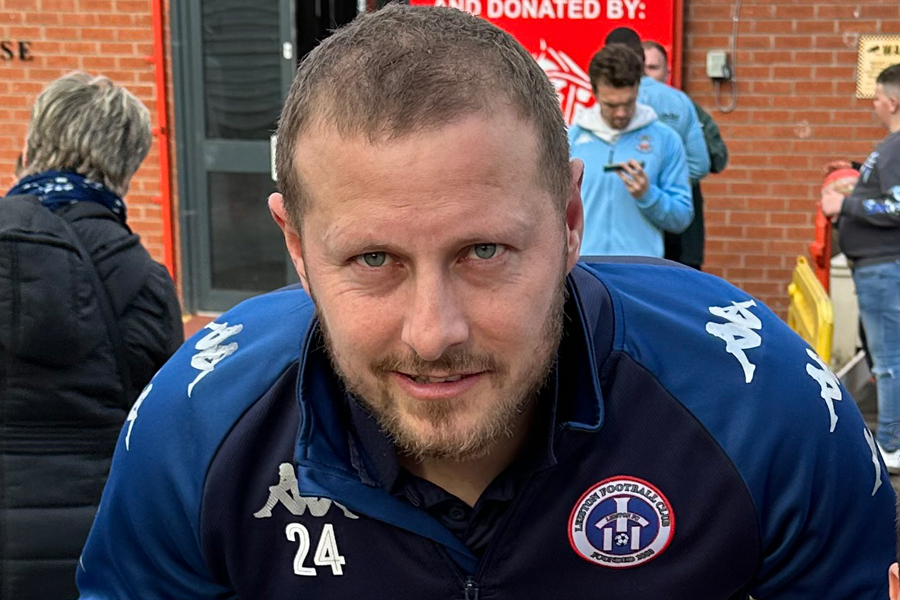
- Jarvis with Leiston in April 2023

Personal information
- Full name: Ross Anthony Jarvis
- Date of birth: 11 March 1988 (age 38)
- Place of birth: Fakenham, England
- Height: 1.80 m (5 ft 11 in)
- Positions: Defender; midfielder

Team information
- Current team: Gorleston

Youth career
- 1996–2005: Norwich City

Senior career*
Years	Team	Apps	(Gls)
2005–2008	Norwich City	7	(0)
2007	→ Torquay United (loan)	4	(0)
2007	→ Rotherham United (loan)	10	(0)
2008–2010	Luton Town	62	(3)
2010–2011	Barnet	22	(0)
2011–2013	Cambridge United	82	(1)
2013	Oakleigh Cannons	5	(0)
2013–2018	Lowestoft Town	167	(6)
2018	Dereham Town	4	(1)
2018–2021	Lowestoft Town	53	(0)
2021–2022	Dereham Town	26	(2)
2022–2025	Leiston	65	(1)
2025–	Gorleston	0	(0)

International career
2006–2007	England U19	8	(0)
2009–2010	England C	3	(0)
Medal record
Luton Town
Winner	Football League Trophy	2009
- * Club domestic league appearances and goals as of 02:57, 23 June 2025 (UTC)

Ross Anthony "Rossi" Jarvis (born 11 March 1988) is an English footballer who plays as a defender for Isthmian League North side Gorleston.

== Club career ==
=== Norwich City ===
Jarvis began his career as a trainee with Norwich City, making history as the youngest player to appear in their reserve side when aged only 14. The younger brother of fellow Norwich academy product Ryan Jarvis, he progressed to become a trainee with the Canaries and made his senior debut as a second-half substitute for Dean Marney in a 2–1 League Cup defeat away to Birmingham City on 26 October 2005. His league debut came on 5 November 2005, as a substitute in a 2–0 defeat away to Wolverhampton Wanderers. He made one further appearance in the league as a substitute, away to Millwall, before signing a professional contract in January 2006.

The two Jarvis brothers played together for Norwich on only one occasion – a League Cup tie against Rotherham United on 19 September 2006. That proved to be Jarvis' only appearance for Norwich in the 2006–07 season, as he was loaned out to League Two side Torquay on 25 January 2007. He played four times for the Gulls before a back injury ended his loan spell. After recovering, Jarvis played out the remainder of the season on loan at League One Rotherham United, making ten appearances.

It would be almost a year on from the League Cup game at Rotherham until Jarvis next played a competitive game for Norwich. With suspensions to Dion Dublin, Jason Shackell, and Julien Brellier, Jarvis started in a League Cup Third Round tie on 25 September 2007 away to then Premier League high-flyers Manchester City, along with fellow academy graduate Michael Spillane. Both players performances drew high praise from the media, as Norwich lost the game 1–0. Jarvis started his first ever league game for Norwich against Sheffield Wednesday four days later, and went on to start in three further games. However, he failed to feature under new Canaries manager Glenn Roeder, who was appointed on 30 October 2007, and was released by the club in May 2008.

=== Luton Town ===
Jarvis signed for League Two side Luton Town, who had been hit with a 30-point deduction, on 7 August 2008. He found some familiar faces in the dressing room, as the Hatters' squad included ex-Norwich teammates Michael Spillane, Chris Martin and Paul McVeigh. Jarvis played a total of 46 games for Luton in 2008–09, including in every round of the club's Football League Trophy success, scoring the winning goal in the quarter-final against Walsall. He is known for his accurate set piece delivery, using this to contribute to ten assists in the 2008–09 season.

Though he was a regular player under Luton manager Mick Harford, his dismissal in October 2009, and subsequent replacement in Richard Money, saw Jarvis used sparsely. On 7 May 2010, he was released from his contract at Luton, having made 71 appearances for the club.

=== Barnet ===
In June 2010, Jarvis joined Barnet. He made his debut for the Bees on the opening day of the 2010–11 season away to Chesterfield and was replaced in the 54th minute by fellow debutant, Ricky Holmes. He left Barnet at the end of the 2010–11 season, having made 22 league appearances.

=== Cambridge United ===
Jarvis signed a one-month contract with Conference National side Cambridge United in August 2011 after impressing during a trial. This was then extended to a one-year contract on 31 August 2011. The midfielder signed a new one-year contract with The U's on 8 May 2012 after making 39 starts in his first season at the club.

=== Lowestoft Town & Dereham Town ===
After a brief spell in Australia with Oakleigh Cannons, Jarvis joined Lowestoft Town in 2013. After 159 league appearances, he joined Dereham Town in April 2018 before re-joining the Trawler Boys for the 2018–19 season. Jarvis left Lowestoft Town again in May 2021 and re-joined Dereham Town at the end of the month. Jarvis made 26 appearances and scored two goals in the Isthmian League North Division and played once in the FA Cup.

=== Leiston ===
On 13 June 2022, Jarvis signed for Southern League Premier Division Central side Leiston, joining his brother Ryan, who signed for the club the previous week.

== International career ==
Whilst in non-League football with Luton, Jarvis was eligible to be called into the England C squad for friendlies against both Hungary under-23s and Poland under-23s in September and November 2009. He played in both, and captained the side to a 2–1 victory in Poland.

== Personal life ==
His older brother Ryan Jarvis and his cousin Adam Tann have also played professional football.

== Honours ==
Luton Town

- Football League Trophy: 2008–09
