= Danny Kelly (footballer, born 1990) =

Irish footballer

Personal information
- Full name: Danny Michael Kelly
- Date of birth: 18 October 1990 (age 36)
- Place of birth: Cambridge, England
- Position: Forward

Team information
- Current team: St Ives Town

Youth career
- Cambridge United
- Peterborough United
- Histon
- 2007–2009: Norwich City

Senior career*
Years	Team	Apps	(Gls)
2009–2010	Norwich City	0	(0)
2010–2011	Barnet	3	(0)
2011	→ Dover Athletic (loan)	4	(0)
2011	→ Eastbourne Borough (loan)	12	(0)
2011–2012	Cambridge City	25	(10)
2012–2013	Bentleigh Greens	13	(1)
2012–2013	South Springvale	8	(3)
2014–2016	Cambridge City	89	(24)
2016–	St Ives Town	103	(16)

International career^{‡}
2008–2010	Republic of Ireland U19		
- * Club domestic league appearances and goals as of 23:07, 24 February 2021 (UTC) ‡ National team caps and goals as of 04:24, 21 January 2012 (UTC)

Danny Michael Kelly (born 18 October 1990) is a footballer who plays for St Ives Town. Born in England, he has represented Ireland at youth level.

== Career ==
After spells with the youth teams of Cambridge United, Peterborough United and Histon, Kelly joined Norwich City in 2007. Successful performances in the youth and reserve teams saw him rewarded with a one-year professional contract in 2009. However, he never played for The Canaries first team; the closest he came were five appearances on the bench. He joined League Two side Barnet in the summer of 2010 and made his debut against Chesterfield. He made a further three substitute appearances before being sidelined for a number of months with an ankle ligament injury.

Kelly was sent on loan after recovering from injury to Conference South club Dover Athletic for one month, playing in four games. He then signed for Conference National side Eastbourne Borough on loan in March 2011, going on to make 12 appearances for the club both as a striker and at centre-back.

Kelly was released by Barnet in May 2011. He joined Cambridge City on a free transfer on 26 August 2011, but left to find a new club after scoring 10 goals in 25 games.

Kelly then moved to Australia and played for Bentleigh Greens in the Victorian Premier League, as well as South Springvale in the Victorian State League Division 2.

In 2014, Kelly returned to England and re-joined Cambridge City. He joined St Ives Town for the 2016–17 season.

At international level he has captained the Republic of Ireland under-19 side.
