= Charlie Taylor (footballer, born 1985) =

English footballer

Personal information
- Full name: Charlie James Taylor
- Date of birth: 1 December 1985 (age 40)
- Place of birth: Lewisham, England
- Height: 6 ft 2 in (1.88 m)
- Position: Forward

Youth career
- 2001–2002: Charlton Athletic
- 2002–2003: Crystal Palace
- 2003–2004: Nottingham Forest

Senior career*
Years	Team	Apps	(Gls)
2004	Welling United		
2004	Hornchurch	3	(0)
2004–2005	Fisher Athletic		
2005–2008	Margate		
2008–2009	Dulwich Hamlet	19	(10)
2009	Grays Athletic	11	(1)
2009–2010	Sutton United	27	(8)
2010–2012	Barnet	36	(2)
2012	Eastbourne Borough	0	(0)
2012–201?	Billericay Town	17	(4)
- * Club domestic league appearances and goals as of 14:50, 11 May 2013 (UTC)

Charlie James Taylor (born 1 December 1985) is a professional footballer who was last attached to Billericay Town.

== Career ==
Taylor started his career as a trainee with Charlton Athletic, Crystal Palace and Nottingham Forest, before dropping into non-League football. Taylor signed for Welling United before leaving in 2004 to join Hornchurch. He then had spells at Fisher Athletic, Margate and Dulwich Hamlet before joining Grays Athletic in 2009. He scored once in 11 games for Grays, away at Crawley Town in the 1–1 draw in the Conference National on 29 August.

In July 2010, Taylor had an unsuccessful trial with Championship club Bristol City, before eventually signing for Barnet on 31 August 2010 from Isthmian League Premier Division club Sutton United. Taylor made his debut on 25 September for Barnet in their 2–2 away draw with Morecambe in League Two, replacing Steve Kabba in the 65th minute as a substitute.

Taylor was given a three-match ban for spitting at an opponent in a game against Aldershot Town in October 2011.

Taylor was sent off for violent conduct in the Football League Trophy Area Final against Swindon Town in February 2012 after coming on as a substitute and playing for 10 minutes. It was announced on 13 April 2012, that Taylor had left the club by mutual consent.

In October 2012 he joined Billericay Town.

== Style of play ==
Football manager, Mark Stimson described Taylor as "a striker who plays off the shoulder".
