= Tom Coulton =

English footballer

Personal information
- Full name: Thomas Philip Coulton
- Date of birth: 15 November 1992 (age 33)
- Height: 1.83 m (6 ft 0 in)
- Position: Goalkeeper

Youth career
- Arsenal
- Barnet

Senior career*
Years	Team	Apps	(Gls)
2010–2011	Barnet	1	(0)
	Leverstock Green	29	(0)
2013–2015	St Albans City	6	(0)
2013	→ Berkhamsted (loan)	1	(0)
2015	→ Ware (dual registration)	17	(0)
	→ Barton Rovers (loan)	1	(0)
2015–2016	Ware	26	(0)
2016	London Colney	3	(0)
2016	St Albans City	0	(0)
2016–2017	Barton Rovers	20	(0)
2017	Ware	18	(0)
	Ware	1	(0)
- * Club domestic league appearances and goals as of 17:59, 1 April 2018 (UTC)

Thomas Philip Coulton (born 15 November 1992) is an English footballer who last played for Ware.

== Career ==
Coulton started his career at Arsenal but later signed for Barnet. He made his Barnet debut on 4 January 2011 aged just 18 in their 2–4 loss against Stevenage. He was released by Barnet at the end of the 2010–11 season.

He signed for Leverstock Green for the 2012–13 season. After receiving the player of the season award, Coulton attracted interest from higher leagues and subsequently signed for St Albans City. He made his City debut with an excellent display in the Herts Charity Cup final win over Bishop's Stortford in April 2013. On 25 August 2013 he made his debut as a loanee for Berkhamsted.

He kicked off the 2014–15 season as St Albans City warder in the Herts Charity Cup victory over Ware on 2 August 2014, and went on to make another six displays that season, before going to Ware on dual registration terms in January 2015.

St Albans City released him at the end of the campaign, before being signed by Cockfosters in July 2015. However, joint Saints manager James Gray changed his mind and re-signed him and fielded him in the Herts Charity Cup away at Ware on 4 August 2015. Subsequent to that he appeared in the Spartan South Midlands Football League opening game for Cockfosters on 8 August 2015 and the Southern Football League for Barton Rovers home against Ware on 18 August 2015. He saw St Albans City have their first National League South win of the season from the bench against Hemel Hempstead Town on 31 August 2015, before being signed by new Ware boss Ken Charlery in November 2015.

He joined London Colney appearing 3 times before re-signing at St Albans City. His first game for the season at City was against London Colney in the Herts Senior Cup on 31 October 2016. On 7 November 2016 he returned to Barton Rovers.

Ahead of the 2017–18 season he was back at Ware. His provisionally last competitive appearance for the club came in the Herts Senior Cup against Welwyn Garden City on 5 December 2017, which whom he joined in January 2018. His final game before going into retirement was for Ware against Witham Town in the Isthmian League North Division on 27 January 2018.
