= Danny Hart (footballer) =

English footballer

Personal information
- Full name: Danny Gary Hart
- Date of birth: 26 April 1989 (age 37)
- Place of birth: Hendon, England
- Height: 5 ft 9 in (1.75 m)
- Position: Midfielder

Youth career
- Boreham Wood

Senior career*
Years	Team	Apps	(Gls)
2006–2007	Boreham Wood	11	(2)
2007–2011	Barnet	6	(1)
2007	→ Northwood (loan)	8	(1)
2008	→ Wivenhoe Town (loan)	11	(5)
2008–2009	→ Thurrock (loan)	15	(1)
2010	→ Hemel Hempstead Town (loan)	2	(2)
2010	→ Thurrock (loan)	7	(1)
2011	Harrow Borough	12	(2)
2011–2012	St Albans City	23	(2)
2013–2014	Wingate & Finchley	12	(0)
2016	Ware	8	(0)
2016–2017	Potters Bar Town	21	(3)
Total		136	(20)
- * Club domestic league appearances and goals

Danny Gary Hart (born 26 April 1989) is an English former professional footballer.

== Career ==
Born in Barnet, Hart played for Boreham Wood in the 2006–07 season. In October 2007 he was loaned out to Northwood for one month. In February 2008 he was loaned out to Wivenhoe Town for one month. Later in the year he joined Thurrock on loan, a loan spell which was extended until the end of the season. On 29 January 2010, Hart signed for Hemel Hempstead Town on a one-month loan deal. At the start of the 2010–11 season he joined Thurrock again on loan. He was released by Barnet in January 2011.

On 3 March 2011, Hart signed for Harrow Borough of the Isthmian League Premier Division. He then joined St Albans City. On 10 December 2013 Hart made his debut from the substitute's bench for Wingate & Finchley in a 2–0 away defeat to Bury Town.

He later joined Ware in 2016, teaming up with Ken Charlery who was the assistant manager during Hart's time at Harrow Borough and St Albans City.

In the summer of 2016, Hart moved to Southern Football League side Potters Bar Town.
