= Anwar Uddin =

English football manager and former player (born 1981)

Anwar Uddin MBE
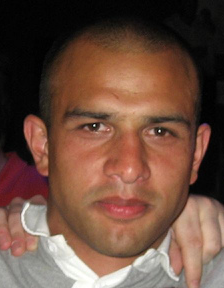
- Anwar in 2007

Personal information
- Full name: Anwar Uddin
- Date of birth: 1 November 1981 (age 45)
- Place of birth: Stepney, England
- Height: 6 ft 2 in (1.88 m)
- Position: Defender

Youth career
- ?–2001: West Ham United

Senior career*
Years	Team	Apps	(Gls)
2001–2002	West Ham United	0	(0)
2002	Sheffield Wednesday	0	(0)
2002–2004	Bristol Rovers	19	(1)
2003–2004	→ Hereford United (loan)	9	(2)
2004	→ Telford United (loan)	6	(0)
2004–2010	Dagenham & Redbridge	188	(6)
2009	→ Grays Athletic (loan)	11	(1)
2010–2012	Barnet	39	(1)
2012	Sutton United	10	(0)
2012–2013	Eastbourne Borough	29	(0)
Total		314	(11)

Managerial career
- 2011: Barnet (assistant manager)
- 2014–2015: Maldon & Tiptree (assistant manager)
- 2015–2016: Sporting Bengal United
- 2017: Ware
- 2017–2019: Glebe
- 2019–2021: Aldershot Town (assistant manager)
- 2024: Ebbsfleet United (assistant manager)
Medal record
West Ham United
Winner	FA Youth Cup	1999
Dagenham & Redbridge
Winner	Football Conference	2007
	Football League Two	2010
- * Club domestic league appearances and goals

Anwar Uddin MBE (born 1 November 1981) is an English football manager and former player. He is the non-executive Chairman at Dagenham & Redbridge.

During a career which began at West Ham United in 2001 and concluded with a season at Eastbourne Borough from 2012 to 2013, Uddin represented several Football League clubs including Dagenham & Redbridge and Barnet. He was the first person of Bangladeshi origin to play professional football in England, and, while at Dagenham & Redbridge, became the first British Asian to captain a football club in the top four divisions of English football.

== Early life ==
Uddin was born and brought up in Stepney, London to a Bangladeshi father and an English mother. He attended Raine's Foundation School in Bethnal Green. His father came to the United Kingdom in the 1960s. Anwar has three sisters and two brothers.

== Playing career ==
Uddin was the first Bangladeshi to play professional football in England and the first British Asian to captain a football club in the top four divisions of English football. He began his football career at West Ham United, working his way up through their youth and reserve teams where he was captain. He was in West Ham's victorious 1999 FA Youth Cup winning squad that defeated Coventry City. Although highly regarded, as a bright talented traditional English defender, he was never able to break through into the first team and in February 2002 moved to Sheffield Wednesday on a free transfer.

His stay was brief as after the collapse of ITV Digital, Sheffield Wednesday could not afford to keep him due to financial difficulties. He moved to Bristol Rovers the following summer after only four months and no appearances. He was an almost ever present in the following season until the end of October, picking up a serious groin injury which he was to struggle with for the rest of the season. At Bristol Rovers he scored his first career goal in a 2–2 draw with York City.

After making a few appearances the following season he was loaned out to Hereford United and Telford United, and was released by Bristol Rovers at the end of the season.

During the summer of 2004, Uddin signed for Dagenham & Redbridge. He became the captain of the team. At the time, Anwar was just one of only five professional British Asians playing in the Football League and Premiership, where it is estimated that Asians only make up 0.2 per cent of players in clubs' centres of excellence and academies.

On 1 September 2009, Uddin signed on loan for Grays Athletic.

In June 2010, Uddin left Dagenham to sign for League Two club Barnet and he was appointed captain ahead of the 2010–11 season. He scored his first and only goal for Barnet in a 3–1 win at Bradford City on 8 January 2011.

In 2011, following the departure of manager Martin Allen, Uddin was appointed as caretaker assistant-manager to Giuliano Grazioli at Barnet making him the first ever British-Asian to take up a coaching position in English football.

On 30 January 2012, Uddin had had his contract terminated by mutual consent. A few days later, he signed for Conference South side Sutton United. On 28 June 2012, he signed for fellow Conference South side Eastbourne Borough. In June 2013, Uddin retired from football and left Eastbourne in order to pursue a career in football coaching.

== Coaching career ==
In 2011 after the departure of Martin Allen from Barnet to Notts County, Anwar stepped into an assistant management position under Giuliano Grazioli with the club sitting in the relegation zone and on the brink of relegation. In the three months in charge of the EFL League Two club they acquired enough points to stay in the division on the last day of the season. Grazioli and Anwar also helped Barnet win the Hertfordshire Senior Cup. Uddin resumed his playing duties as club captain with the arrival of Lawrie Sanchez. Then after retiring due to injury in September 2013, Anwar returned to his first club West Ham United as a part-time coach for their youth team, working with their under 16's group. In September 2014, he was appointed assistant manager of Maldon & Tiptree. In May 2015, he was appointed manager of Sporting Bengal United. In May 2016, Anwar left Sporting Bengal after leading the club to their record Essex Senior League points tally.

In January 2017, he was appointed manager of Ware. However, he left the club in March. In October 2017 he became manager of Glebe. He left the club in January 2019 by mutual consent and joined Maidstone United as first team coach.

On 22 May 2019, Aldershot Town announced the appointment of Uddin as assistant manager to manager Danny Searle, whom he had worked alongside at West Ham's academy, following a coaching role at Maidstone United.

In February 2024, Uddin was appointed assistant manager of Ebbsfleet United following a successful interim period, once again supporting Danny Searle. He departed the club alongside Searle in September 2024 following a poor start to the season.

== Directorship ==
In July 2025, following the takeover of the club by Qatari businessmen, Uddin was appointed non-executive director of Dagenham & Redbridge.

== International eligibility ==
Anwar was eligible to play for the national teams of England and Bangladesh. During May 2007, he visited a youth football camp in Dhaka, with British coach Anthony Ferguson and Canary Wharf's head of public affairs Zakir Khan. Kazi Salahuddin, the chief of Bangladesh Football Federation welcomed him. This was the second time he visited Bangladesh since 1989, when he travelled with his father to his hometown in Sylhet.

== Personal life ==
In 2002, Anwar dated glamour model Leilani Dowding. He now lives in Kent and has two sons, Kai and Jayden.

Anwar is the diversity and inclusion manager at the FA. in the East and South-East of England. He has a full-time role with the Football Supporters' Federation as Diversity and Campaigns Manager in partnership with Kick It Out.

== Honours ==
He was appointed Member of the Order of the British Empire (MBE) in the 2022 Birthday Honours for services to association football.

West Ham United Youth

- FA Youth Cup: 1998–99

Dagenham & Redbridge

- Football League Two play-offs: 2010
- Conference National: 2006–07

== See also ==
- British Asians in association football
- British Bangladeshi
- List of British Bangladeshis
