= Chris Lewington =

English footballer (born 1988)

Personal information
- Full name: Christopher John Lewington
- Date of birth: 23 August 1988 (age 38)
- Place of birth: Sidcup, England
- Height: 1.88 m (6 ft 2 in)
- Position: Goalkeeper

Youth career
- 1999–2002: Charlton Athletic

Senior career*
Years	Team	Apps	(Gls)
2005–2006	Erith & Belvedere		
2006–2007	Dulwich Hamlet	8	(0)
2006	→ Beckenham Town (dual-reg)	2	(0)
2007–2008	Fisher Athletic		
2007–2008	→ Sittingbourne (loan)		
2008–2009	Leatherhead	27	(0)
2009–2014	Dagenham & Redbridge	127	(0)
2014–2015	Colchester United	1	(0)
2015–2016	Margate	23	(0)
2016–2017	Welling United	33	(0)
2017–2019	Dover Athletic	0	(0)
2019	Weymouth	1	(0)
2019–2021	Maidstone United	31	(0)
2021–2023	Cray Valley Paper Mills	72	(0)
2023	Dartford	0	(0)
- * Club domestic league appearances and goals as of 17:10, 17 November 2023 (UTC)

Christopher John Lewington (born 23 August 1988) is an English former professional footballer who played as a goalkeeper.

Lewington began his career with Charlton Athletic until the age of 13, where he took up Sunday league football until the age of 16, when he joined Erith & Belvedere. After one season, he joined Dulwich Hamlet, where he was dual-registered to Beckenham Town, before switching to Champion Hill cohabitants Fisher Athletic in 2007. After a loan spell at Sittingbourne and one and a half years with Fisher, Lewington joined Leatherhead, where his performances earned him a move to the Football League with Dagenham & Redbridge.

In his early days with Dagenham, Lewington was primarily back-up to Daggers legend Tony Roberts until his retirement in 2011. From 2011 to 2014, Lewington was first-choice goalkeeper at the club, where he racked up 143 appearances in all competitions. With his contract expiring in the summer of 2014, he opted to leave in order to find a new challenge. He then joined Colchester United to challenge Sam Walker for the number one jersey, but made just two appearances before being released one year later. He joined Margate in December 2015.

Alongside his playing commitments, Lewington studied for a Bachelor of Arts degree in physical education and sport, and also has an FA coaching qualification. He runs his own specialised goalkeeping coaching sessions, alongside working as a part-time lecturer at North West Kent College in Dartford as a goalkeeping coach and sports lecturer. Lewington was winner of the 2022 parents race.

== Career ==
=== Early career ===
Born in Sidcup, London, Lewington spent three seasons with Charlton Athletic's youth system until the age of 13. After his release by the Addicks, he continued to play Sunday league football until the age of 16, when he entered men's football, joining Erith & Belvedere in the Southern Counties East Football League. He spent one season with the Deres, before joining Isthmian League Division One South side Dulwich Hamlet. Lewington joined Hamlet during 2006–07 pre-season, and following an injury to Carl Emberson, he made his debut in their friendly against Dorking in a 5–1 friendly victory in July 2006.

Lewington was dual registered with Kent League side Beckenham Town during his time with Hamlet, making his debut in August 2006 against Deal Town in a 2–1 victory. Then in early September 2006, Lewington made his first-team debut for Hamlet in their 3–0 FA Cup preliminary round victory against Three Bridges, although he had little to do in a dominant display by Dulwich. He featured once again for Beckenham in their 3–2 away defeat to Lordswood on 12 September and then returned to Dulwich for their 3–0 FA Cup first qualifying round reverse at Walton & Hersham on 16 September. Games followed against Fleet Town - a 4–1 defeat on 30 September, Tooting & Mitcham United in the FA Trophy - a 2–2 draw on 7 October, as well as the replay held on 10 October which ended 7–6 to Tooting after extra time. Further to that, Lewington featured in 3–2 victories against AFC Wimbledon in the London Senior Cup and Maidstone United in the league on 24 and 28 October respectively, a 1–0 win against Chatham Town on 31 October, a 4–3 London Senior Cup exit at home to Thamesmead Town on 14 November, a 3–0 win against Chatham on 21 November, a 4–2 reverse at Hastings United on 25 November, a 2–2 draw with Burgess Hill Town on 28 November a 5–3 extra time loss home loss to Woking in the Surrey Senior Cup on 5 December and in a 2–0 win against the Metropolitan Police on 9 December. He made his final first-team appearance for Dulwich on 12 December when they tied 0–0 with Sittingbourne. However, Lewington did feature for the reserve side as they came out on top against Staines Town Reserves with a 4–1 victory in the Capital League President's Cup final on 22 May 2007.

In June 2007, Lewington followed manager Wayne Burnett from Dulwich to Conference South side Fisher Athletic. Then, in December 2007, he was sent out on loan to Isthmian League Division One South outfit Sittingbourne. Lewington was in fine form as Sittingbourne went five games unbeaten, which saw them rise up the table. He was sent off in a match against Metropolitan Police in February 2008 after bringing down Steve Sergeant in the penalty area in a 2–1 defeat for the Brickies. Lewington then signed a loan extension with the club following his 21-day suspension for the incident against the Met Police. Lewington was then recalled by Fisher in March 2008 following an injury to Simon Overland. Lewington then graduated from the North West Kent College in Dartford, Kent, in 2008, where he studied in Gillingham's education and football programme.

In October 2008, Lewington joined Isthmian League Division One South side Leatherhead, turning down several other clubs in the process. He competed for a first-team spot with Philippines international Neil Etheridge, who was on loan from Fulham at the time. He made his first side for the club in their 2–0 away defeat to Godalming Town on 25 October. Three days later, he experienced his first win for the Tanners on his home debut as they overcame Walton Casuals 2–1 on 28 October. After a delay due to bad weather, his next appearance until 15 November in Leatherhead's 4–2 away win at Eastbourne Town. He also played in wins against Corinthian-Casuals, Cobham in the cup, before a 2–0 defeat to Ashford Town in the Isthmian League Cup. Consecutive defeats followed against Walton & Hersham, a 5–1 loss at Ashford, Croydon Athletic, his former club Dulwich, Kingstonian, and a Surrey Senior Cup reverse at Woking, before finally earning a point in a 3–3 draw with the Metropolitan Police on 24 January 2009. His side earned their first win since 22 November 2008 on 7 February 2009 when they cruised to a 4–0 victory against Crowborough Athletic. He started in a 2–1 defeat to Cray Wanderers, a 2–0 win over Fleet Town, a 6–0 thrashing by Worthing, a 2–1 win on the road at Folkestone Invicta, a 2–0 win against Chipstead, a 1–0 loss at Walton Casuals, a 2–1 win at home to Merstham, a 1–0 defeat away to Corinthian-Casuals, a 2–2 tie with his previous club Sittingbourne, defeats at home to Croydon, away to Merstham and a home defeat at the hands of Eastbourne. Despite a 2–0 win at Whyteleafe, Lewington's team were subject of another defeat at home to Dulwich by 3–0, and experience a bore-draw against Walton & Hersham in his penultimate game of the campaign. Lewington played his final game for Leatherhead on 25 April in a 3–0 home win over Sittingbourne. On the back of a successful season for Lewington, he was named Leatherhead's 'Supporter's Player of the Year' award.

=== Dagenham & Redbridge ===
==== 2009–10 season ====
League Two side Dagenham & Redbridge took Lewington on trial in the summer of 2009. He appeared for the Daggers in their 2009–10 pre-season campaign, with his first outing a 2–1 win against Braintree Town on 27 July 2009. After impressing on trial, Lewington signed a deal with the club on 4 August. He spent his first season primarily on the substitutes bench as back-up for stalwart Tony Roberts as the club were promoted to League One via the play-offs with victory over Rotherham United in the final in May 2010. He then signed a two-year contract extension in May.

==== 2010–11 season ====
Lewington featured more regularly for the Daggers in the 2010–11 pre-season ahead of their maiden season in League One. He first appeared in their 4–0 victory at Boreham Wood in July 2010, as well as playing in a 3–1 defeat to Dartford, and a 1–0 loss at Braintree.

On 31 August, Lewington made his first-team and professional debut for the Daggers against his boyhood club Charlton Athletic in the Football League Trophy. A low drive from Therry Racon passed Lewington from the edge of the box to hand the Addicks a 1–0 win at The Valley. Lewington was handed his Football League debut on 2 November 2010 when Dagenham & Redbridge were handed a 4–0 thumping by Southampton at St Mary's Stadium. With first-team regular Tony Roberts out of action with an ankle injury throughout November, Lewington continued between the sticks, featuring in the 1–1 FA Cup first round draw with Leyton Orient on 6 November, He helped his side to a 3–1 away win against Yeovil Town on 13 November prior to their FA Cup exit to Leyton Orient following a 3–2 defeat in the first round replay held on 16 November. He played his final game of the season on 20 November, a 1–0 defeat at Victoria Road. Lewington was on the bench for the Daggers' 5–0 capitulation against Peterborough United on 7 May 2011, a result which sealed their relegation back to League Two. He made a total of six appearances in his second season with the club.

==== 2011–12 season ====
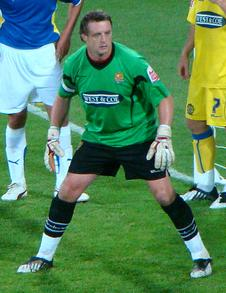
Tony Roberts, who made over 400 league appearances for Dagenham & Redbridge, retired in 2011, allowing Lewington to take his place in goal.

The Daggers returned to begin the 2011–12 pre-season campaign on 12 July 2011 with a comfortable 2–0 win over Boreham Wood, with Lewington the only player to play the full 90 minutes. Having announced his retirement from professional football ahead of Dagenham's friendly against West Ham United on 26 July, Tony Roberts stepped aside to make Lewington the Daggers' first choice goalkeeper. He played the first 45 minutes of the game, which ended 1–0 to the Hammers. Manager John Still moved quickly to sign Arsenal youth goalkeeper James Shea to challenge Lewington for the number one shirt, while Roberts backed both players as capable replacements for himself.

Lewington began the season with a clean sheet in Dagenham's 1–0 win against Macclesfield Town on 6 August, despite being sent off late on after a deliberate handball. After completing his ban, Lewington established himself as first-choice goalkeeper over Shea, recording three clean sheets in his first four matches, with teammate Damian Scannell describing him as "the best keeper in this division in this division and the division above [League One]". Scannell also added that Sam Walker, whose solid performance in goal for Northampton Town helped the Cobblers to a 2–1 win over the Daggers on 24 September, was "not better than Chris Lewington". John Still added that he expected a lot of interest from other clubs in his goalkeeper, following further good performances, including a second-half penalty save from Ryan Hall in their 3–1 defeat to the Shrimpers in the Football League Trophy on 4 October. After making 19 league appearances, Lewington signed a new three-year deal on 1 November. On the back of Lewington's form, Arsenal decided to recall James Shea from his season-long loan with Dagenham, with the stopper only making five appearances between August and December.

Lewington received his second red card of the season in a 5–0 league defeat to Cheltenham Town on 18 February 2012, a result which sent the Daggers to the bottom of the League Two table. Dagenham were two goals down when Lewington was sent off for handling the ball outside of the box after 41 minutes. John Still appealed the red card but the decision was upheld with Lewington forced to serve a two-game ban. On his return to action, Lewington helped his side pull away from the relegation zone, including a penalty save in a crucial 1–0 away win at Port Vale on 31 March. The performance earned him a spot in the League Two 'Team of the Week', alongside goalscorer in the game Michael Spillane. With the side securing League Two safety for another season, Lewington ended the campaign with a total of 47 appearances in all competitions.

==== 2012–13 season ====
A last gasp penalty from Kevin Kilbane secured a 1–0 League Cup win for Coventry City in Lewington's first game of the 2012–13 season on 14 August 2012. In Dagenham's 3 November 4–0 defeat to Bournemouth in the FA Cup, Lewington picked up a head injury early in the first-half which forced him into being taken off at half-time with concussion. John Still publicly backed Lewington following a mistake made in the Daggers 3–2 defeat at home to Port Vale on 29 December. Lewington came out of his goal after four minutes of the game to claim a long throw-in, but missed the ball, allowing Vale's Tom Pope to head into an empty net.

Lewington was reunited with his former boss at Dulwich Hamlet and Fisher Athletic Wayne Burnett, when he was appointed interim manager following John Still's departure for Luton Town in February 2013. Despite losing their decisive final game of the season 1–0 to York City on 20 April, the Daggers secured their place in the Football League and avoided relegation to the Conference for a further season. Lewington was dropped for the game in favour of young goalkeeper Jordan Seabright. Lewington added a further 45 appearances to his tally across to 2012–13 season.

==== 2013–14 season ====
Lewington started the 2013–14 pre-season with a clean sheet in a 5–0 drubbing of Dover Athletic at the Crabble Athletic Ground on 6 July 2013, with further appearances in home defeats to Crystal Palace and Charlton Athletic through July. He made his first appearance of the season in the league 3–1 league defeat to Fleetwood Town on 3 August.

In September 2013, Lewington hailed the impact that new goalkeeping coach Jim Stannard had made on his game. Stannard's arrival from Premier League side Southampton was welcomed after the Daggers went without a recognised goalkeeping coach for much of the 2012–13 season. A back injury in October kept Lewington out of first-team action during the middle of the month, allowing Jordan Seabright to step in.

After keeping a clean sheet in the Daggers 1–0 win against high-flying Rochdale on 1 February 2014, Lewington was insistent that his side could haul themselves back into the hunt for the play-off positions. Lewington then played his final game for the club on 18 April as Dagenham grabbed their first-ever win at Torquay United, with the decisive goal coming from Medy Elito as Lewington earned himself another clean sheet. Jordan Seabright was given his chance to impress for the final few games of the season while both goalkeepers' contracts were due to expire at the end of the season. He made 45 appearances throughout the season for Dagenham.

After spending five years with the club, Lewington decided it was the right time to leave in order to find a new challenge, having made 143 appearances during his stay.

On 25 June, it was revealed Lewington was on trial with Championship side Watford, joining the team in their pre-season training camp in Udine, Italy, in a bid to earn a contract with the club.

=== Colchester United ===
On 1 July 2014, League One club Colchester United confirmed the signing of Lewington on a three-year contract. Lewington was brought in to contest the number one jersey with Sam Walker, saying that "it's up to me to come in and try and make it mine". In a pre-season friendly against Heybridge Swifts on 15 July, Lewington took the unusual step of starting in goal for the Swifts after their regular goalkeeper Danny Sambridge arrived late for the game. Lewington kept a clean sheet until Sambridge was ready to join the game, in what was an eventual 8–0 win for Colchester. He also appeared in a friendly against his former club Dagenham & Redbridge, with the U's coming out on top in a 4–3 victory on 26 July.

Lewington was in line to make his Colchester United debut in their League Cup fixture against his boyhood club Charlton Athletic at The Valley on 12 August, where he expected friends and family to be in attendance for what was his local side, and the club he supported in his youth. He played the full 90 minutes in the match as Colchester fell to a 4–0 defeat. With Sam Walker firmly established as Colchester's number one goalkeeper, Lewington had to wait until 14 April 2015 for his next first team opportunity, where he replaced Walker in the starting line-up for their League One fixture against Chesterfield. He conceded three goals in either half of a 6–0 defeat, bringing his tally to ten goals conceded in two games for the club.

After just two first-team appearances for Colchester, in addition to the summer arrivals of Elliot Parish and Dillon Barnes, Lewington had his contract with the club cancelled by mutual consent on 3 September 2015.

=== Margate ===
Lewington signed for Margate of the National League South on 18 December 2015, making his debut the following day in a 1–0 win against Gosport Borough.

=== Welling United ===
In July 2016 he signed for newly relegated Welling United of National League South.

=== Dover Athletic ===
On 22 August 2017, Lewington signed for Dover Athletic after leaving Welling.

=== Non-League ===
On 19 January 2019 he joined Weymouth. But less than a month later, on 8 February 2019, he joined Maidstone United. In April 2021, Lewington departed Maidstone to join Cray Valley Paper Mills.

On 20 October 2023, Lewington signed a short-term deal with Dartford.

== Personal life ==
During his time playing non-league football, Lewington studied at university, where he achieved a Bachelor of Arts degree in physical education and sport. He combined his playing career with working as a part-time teacher at the North West Kent College in Dartford, Kent, where he worked twice a week after training with Dagenham & Redbridge, helping the Dartford Academy team with their theory work. Lewington himself was a graduate of the football academy 2008, and also helped out as a goalkeeping coach and sport lecturer. In addition to his North West Kent College work, Lewington runs his own specialised goalkeeping coaching sessions called CL Goalkeeping.

== Career statistics ==
As of match played 30 April 2016.

Appearances and goals by club, season and competition
Club	Season	League			FA Cup		League Cup		Other		Total	
Club	Season	Division	Apps	Goals	Apps	Goals	Apps	Goals	Apps	Goals	Apps	Goals
Dulwich Hamlet	2006–07	IL Division One South	8	0	2	0	—		5 (Note: Appearances in FA Trophy, London Senior Cup and Surrey Senior Cup)	0	15	0
Beckenham Town	2006–07	Kent League	2	0	—		—		—		2	0
Leatherhead	2008–09	IL Division One South	27	0	0	0	—		3 (Note: Appearances in Surrey Senior Cup and Isthmian League Cup)	0	30	0
Dagenham & Redbridge	2010–11	League One	3	0	2	0	0	0	1 (Note: Appearance(s) in the Football League Trophy)	0	6	0
Dagenham & Redbridge	2011–12	League Two	41	0	5	0	0	0	1	0	47	0
Dagenham & Redbridge	2012–13	League Two	41	0	1	0	1	0	2	0	45	0
Dagenham & Redbridge	2013–14	League Two	42	0	1	0	1	0	1	0	45	0
Dagenham & Redbridge	Total		127	0	9	0	2	0	5	0	143	0
Colchester United	2014–15	League One	1	0	0	0	1	0	0	0	2	0
Colchester United	2015–16	League One	0	0	—		0	0	0	0	0	0
Colchester United	Total		1	0	0	0	1	0	0	0	2	0
Margate	2015–16	National League South	23	0	—		—		—		23	0
Career total			188	0	11	0	3	0	13	0	215	0

== Honours ==
Dagenham & Redbridge

- Football League Two play-offs: 2010
