= 2013–14 Dagenham & Redbridge F.C. season =

Dagenham & Redbridge
2013–14 season
- Chairman: David Andrews (until 28 November 2013); David Bennett
- Manager: Wayne Burnett
- Stadium: Victoria Road
- League Two: 9th
- FA Cup: First round
- League Cup: First round
- Football League Trophy: Southern quarter final
- Top goalscorer: League: Rhys Murphy (13); All: Rhys Murphy (13)
- Highest home attendance: 3,357 (v Hartlepool United, League Two, 8 February 2014)
- Lowest home attendance: 1,050 (v Colchester United, Football League Trophy, 3 September 2013)
- Average home league attendance: 1,920
Home colours	Away colours

The 2013–14 season is the 7th season in the Football League played by Dagenham & Redbridge F.C., an English football club based in Dagenham, Greater London. It is their third consecutive season in Football League Two after relegation from Football League One in 2011. The season covers the period from 1 July 2013 to 30 June 2014.

== Match details ==
League positions are sourced from Statto, while the remaining contents of each table are sourced from the references in the "Ref" column.

=== League table ===
Pos	Team	Pld	W	D	L	GF	GA	GD	Pts	Promotion, qualification or relegation
7	York City	46	18	17	11	52	41	+11	71	Qualification for League Two play-offs
8	Oxford United	46	16	14	16	53	50	+3	62	
9	Dagenham & Redbridge	46	15	15	16	53	59	−6	60	
10	Plymouth Argyle	46	16	12	18	51	58	−7	60	
11	Mansfield Town	46	15	15	16	49	58	−9	60	

Updated to match(es) played on 3 May 2014. Source: BBC Sport
Rules for classification: 1) Points; 2) Goal difference; 3) Number of goals scored

=== Football League Two ===
Date	League position	Opponents	Venue	Result	Score F–A	Scorers	Attendance	Ref
3 August 2013	19th	Fleetwood Town	A	L	1–3	Murphy 25'	2,511	
10 August 2013	12th	York City	H	W	2–0	Murphy 35', Woodall 78'	1,487	
17 August 2013	11th	Scunthorpe United	A	D	1–1	Howell 90+2'	3,694	
24 August 2013	12th	Newport County	H	D	1–1	Ogogo 59'	1,564	
31 August 2013	19th	Mansfield Town	A	L	0–3		3,015	
7 September 2013	17th	Exeter City	H	D	1–1	Scott 20'	2,003	
14 September 2013	14th	Bristol Rovers	H	W	2–0	Ogogo 10', Howell 72'	1,423	
21 September 2013	13th	Morecambe	A	D	2–2	Ogogo 21', Murphy 90+4'	1,709	
28 September 2013	12th	Bury	H	W	2–1	Obafemi 44', Murphy 52'	1,604	
4 October 2013	8th	Accrington Stanley	A	W	2–1	Hines 56', Murphy 61'	1,833	
12 October 2013	13th	Cheltenham Town	H	L	1–2	Ogogo 40'	1,727	
19 October 2013	14th	Northampton Town	A	D	2–2	Hines 40', Murphy 42'	4,046	
22 October 2013	13th	Southend United	A	W	1–0	Murphy 31'	4,523	
26 October 2013	8th	Rochdale	H	W	3–1	Murphy 9', Elito (2) 52', 90+5'	1,742	
2 November 2013	11th	Hartlepool United	A	L	1–2	Hines 56'	3,450	
16 November 2013	7th	Burton Albion	H	W	2–0	Hines 8' pen., Howell 54'	1,626	
23 November 2013	9th	Plymouth Argyle	A	L	1–2	Hines 45+2'	6,184	
26 November 2013	9th	AFC Wimbledon	A	D	1–1	Murphy 58'	3,862	
30 November 2013	8th	Wycombe Wanderers	H	W	2–0	Obafemi 24', Murphy 47' pen.	1,618	
14 December 2013	10th	Oxford United	A	L	1–2	Murphy 45+2'	4,901	
21 December 2013	10th	Torquay United	H	L	0–1		1,675	
26 December 2013	11th	Portsmouth	A	L	0–1		15,192	
29 December 2013	12th	Chesterfield	A	D	1–1	Ogogo 58'	5,906	
1 January 2014	10th	AFC Wimbledon	H	W	1–0	Ogogo 10'	2,012	
4 January 2014	10th	York City	A	L	1–3	Murphy 80'	3,207	
11 January 2014	10th	Fleetwood Town	H	L	0–1		1,679	
25 January 2014	10th	Scunthorpe United	H	D	3–3	Ogogo 67', Dickson 77', Norris 89'	2,037	
28 January 2014	11th	Southend United	H	D	1–1	Norris 68'	2,624	
1 February 2014	9th	Rochdale	A	W	1–0	Murphy 63'	2,273	
8 February 2014	9th	Hartlepool United	H	L	0–2		3,357	
15 February 2014	9th	Burton Albion	A	D	1–1	D'Ath 45'	2,934	
22 February 2014	12th	Plymouth Argyle	H	L	1–2	Hines 23'	2,026	
1 March 2014	14th	Mansfield Town	H	D	0–0		1,377	
8 March 2014	15th	Exeter City	A	D	2–2	Norris 62', Elito 72' pen.	3,057	
11 March 2014	12th	Bristol Rovers	A	W	2–1	Azeez (2) 23', 58'	5,761	
15 March 2014	13th	Morecambe	H	D	1–1	Elito 52' pen.	1,718	
19 March 2014	11th	Newport County	A	W	2–1	Elito (2) 10', 43'	2,360	
22 March 2014	10th	Bury	A	D	1–1	Norris 67'	2,705	
25 March 2014	10th	Accrington Stanley	H	D	0–0		1,383	
29 March 2014	10th	Oxford United	H	W	1–0	Howell 90'	1,893	
5 April 2014	10th	Wycombe Wanderers	A	L	0–2		3,103	
12 April 2014	12th	Portsmouth	H	L	1–4	Ogogo 34'	3,115	
18 April 2014	11th	Torquay United	A	W	1–0	Elito 67' pen.	2,425	
21 April 2014	11th	Chesterfield	H	L	0–1		1,801	
26 April 2014	12th	Northampton Town	H	L	0–3		2,668	
3 May 2014	9th	Cheltenham Town	A	W	3–2	Jombati 21' o.g., Doe 44', Azeez 68'	3,002	

=== FA Cup ===
Round	Date	Opponents	Venue	Result	Score F–A	Scorers	Attendance	Ref
First round	9 November 2013	Bristol City	A	L	0–3		3,763	

=== League Cup ===
Round	Date	Opponents	Venue	Result	Score F–A	Scorers	Attendance	Ref
First round	6 August 2013	Brentford	A	L	2–3	Nugent 18' o.g., Scott 81'	3,586	

=== Football League Trophy ===
Round	Date	Opponents	Venue	Result	Score F–A	Scorers	Attendance	Ref
First round	3 September 2013	Colchester United	H	W	4–1	Elito 53', Saah 64', Ogogo 78', Dennis 85'	1,050	
Second round	8 October 2013	Southend United	A	W	5–2	Hines (2) 26', 60', Saah 58', Dickson 64', Obafemi 66'	3,236	
Southern quarter final	12 November 2013	Peterborough United	A	L	0–1		4,830	

== Squad statistics ==
As of match played 3 May 2014.
Numbers in parentheses denote appearances as substitute.
Players with names struck through and marked † left the club during the playing season.
Players with names in italics and marked * were on loan from another club for the whole of their season with Dagenham & Redbridge.
Players listed with no appearances have been in the matchday squad but only as unused substitutes.
Key to positions: GK – Goalkeeper; DF – Defender; MF – Midfielder; FW – Forward

No.	Pos.	Nat.	Name	League		FA Cup		League Cup		FL Trophy		Total		Discipline	
No.	Pos.	Nat.	Name	Apps	Goals	Apps	Goals	Apps	Goals	Apps	Goals	Apps	Goals	A yellow rectangle, denoting the yellow penalty card shown to a player being cautioned	A red rectangle, denoting the red penalty card shown to a player being sent off
1	GK	ENG	Chris Lewington	42	0	1	0	1	0	1	0	45	0	0	0
2	DF	ENG	Luke Wilkinson	18 (4)	0	0 (1)	0	0	0	2	0	20 (5)	0	3	0
3	DF	ENG	Femi Ilesanmi	23 (6)	0	0	0	1	0	2	0	26 (6)	0	1	0
4	DF	ENG	Scott Doe	36 (1)	1	1	0	1	0	1	0	39 (1)	1	8	1
5	DF	ENG	Brian Saah	41 (2)	0	1	0	1	0	3	2	46 (2)	2	5	0
6	MF	ENG	Billy Bingham	23 (7)	0	1	0	0	0	2 (1)	0	26 (8)	0	1	0
7	MF	ENG	Medy Elito	37 (8)	7	1	0	1	0	3	1	42 (8)	8	4	0
8	MF	ENG	Abu Ogogo	44	8	1	0	1	0	3	1	49	9	9	0
9	FW	IRL	Rhys Murphy	32	13	1	0	1	0	1	0	35	13	5	0
10	FW	ENG	~~Josh Scott~~ †	6 (5)	1	0	0	1	1	1 (1)	0	8 (6)	2	1	0
10	FW	ENG	~~Ashley Chambers~~ * †	4 (2)	0	0	0	0	0	0	0	4 (2)	0	0	0
11	MF	ENG	Afolabi Obafemi	9 (13)	2	0 (1)	0	0 (1)	0	2 (1)	1	11 (16)	3	0	0
12	MF	ENG	Lawson D'Ath *	18 (4)	1	0	0	0	0	0	0	18 (4)	1	8	1
14	FW	ENG	~~Jake Reed~~ †	0 (2)	0	0	0	1	0	0	0	1 (2)	0	0	0
14	FW	GHA	Chris Dickson	3 (22)	1	0 (1)	0	0	0	2	1	5 (23)	2	1	0
15	MF	ENG	Matthew Saunders	2 (2)	0	0	0	0	0	1 (1)	0	3 (3)	0	1	0
16	FW	ENG	~~Louis Dennis~~ †	0 (2)	0	0	0	0	0	0 (1)	1	0 (3)	1	0	0
17	MF	ENG	Luke Howell	36 (4)	4	1	0	1	0	0 (1)	0	38 (5)	4	2	0
18	DF	TRI	Gavin Hoyte	42	0	1	0	1	0	3	0	47	0	7	1
19	MF	ENG	~~Anthony Edgar~~ †	0 (7)	0	0	0	0	0	0	0	0 (7)	0	0	0
20	MF	NIR	Sean Shields	2 (10)	0	0	0	0	0	0 (1)	0	2 (11)	0	0	0
21	FW	ENG	Alex Osborn	0	0	0	0	0	0	0	0	0	0	0	0
22	DF	ENG	Ian Gayle	3 (1)	0	0	0	0	0	0	0	3 (1)	0	0	0
23	FW	ENG	~~Brian Woodall~~ †	4 (4)	1	0	0	0 (1)	0	0 (1)	0	4 (6)	1	0	0
23	FW	ITA	~~Gianluca Gracco~~ †	0	0	0	0	0	0	0	0	0	0	0	0
25	MF	ENG	Blair Turgott *	3 (2)	0	0	0	0	0	0	0	3 (2)	0	2	0
26	DF	IRL	Jack Connors	23	0	1	0	0	0	1	0	25	0	3	1
27	FW	ENG	Ade Azeez *	10 (5)	3	0	0	0	0	0	0	10 (5)	3	2	0
28	FW	ENG	~~Dominic Samuel~~ * †	1	0	0	0	0	0	0	0	1	0	0	0
28	FW	ENG	Jon Nouble	0 (1)	0	0	0	0	0	0	0	0 (1)	0	0	0
29	FW	ENG	Bradley Goldberg	0	0	0	0	0	0	0	0	0	0	0	0
30	GK	ENG	Jordan Seabright	4	0	0	0	0	0	2	0	6	0	0	0
31	GK	ENG	Lloyd Anderson	0	0	0	0	0	0	0	0	0	0	0	0
33	FW	ENG	Luke Norris *	16 (3)	4	0	0	0	0	0	0	16 (3)	4	1	0
41	FW	ENG	Zavon Hines	26 (1)	6	1	0	0	0	3	2	30 (1)	8	8	0

== Transfers ==
=== In ===
Date	Name	From	Fee	Ref
11 July 2013	Afolabi Obafemi	Leyton Orient	Free	
21 July 2013	Brian Saah	Torquay United	Free	
23 July 2013	Rhys Murphy	Telstar	Free	
14 August 2013	Bradley Goldberg	Hastings United	Free	
22 August 2013	Zavon Hines	Bradford City	Free	
3 October 2013	Chris Dickson	Shanghai Dongya	Free	
14 November 2013	Anthony Edgar	Barnet	Free	

=== Out ===
Date	Name	To	Fee	Ref
11 September 2013	Gianluca Gracco		Released	
1 October 2013	Jake Reed	Lowestoft Town	Released	
2 January 2014	Brian Woodall	Bishop's Stortford	Released	
15 January 2014	Josh Scott	Aldershot Town	Released	
24 January 2014	Louis Dennis	Bromley	Released	
27 January 2014	Anthony Edgar		Released	

=== Loans in ===
Date	Name	From	End date	Ref
28 November 2013	Lawson D'Ath	Reading	31 May 2014	
9 January 2014	Dominic Samuel	Reading	23 January 2014	
23 January 2014	Luke Norris	Brentford	3 May 2014	
8 February 2014	Ade Azeez	Charlton Athletic	3 May 2014	
7 March 2014	Ashley Chambers	Cambridge United	4 April 2014	
27 March 2014	Blair Turgott	West Ham United	3 May 2014	

=== Loans out ===
Date	Name	To	End date	Ref
8 August 2013	Jon Nouble	Thurrock	28 September 2013	
14 August 2013	Nathan Ferguson	Chelmsford City	8 September 2013	
14 August 2013	Alex Osborn	Ebbsfleet United	31 May 2014	
14 August 2013	Bradley Goldberg	Bromley	31 May 2014	
18 August 2013	Daniel Rumens	Thurrock	17 November 2013	
13 November 2013	Ian Gayle	Grays Athletic	4 January 2014	
14 November 2013	Jon Nouble	Grays Athletic	12 December 2013	
14 November 2013	Brian Woodall	Dover Athletic	1 January 2014	
15 November 2013	Louis Dennis	Hayes & Yeading United	14 December 2013	
17 November 2013	Daniel Rumens	VCD Athletic	17 December 2013	
20 December 2013	Nathan Ferguson	St Albans City	20 January 2014	
4 February 2014	Ian Gayle	Whitehawk	8 March 2014	
14 February 2014	Daniel Rumens	Harlow Town	14 March 2014	
