= Femi Ilesanmi =

English association football player

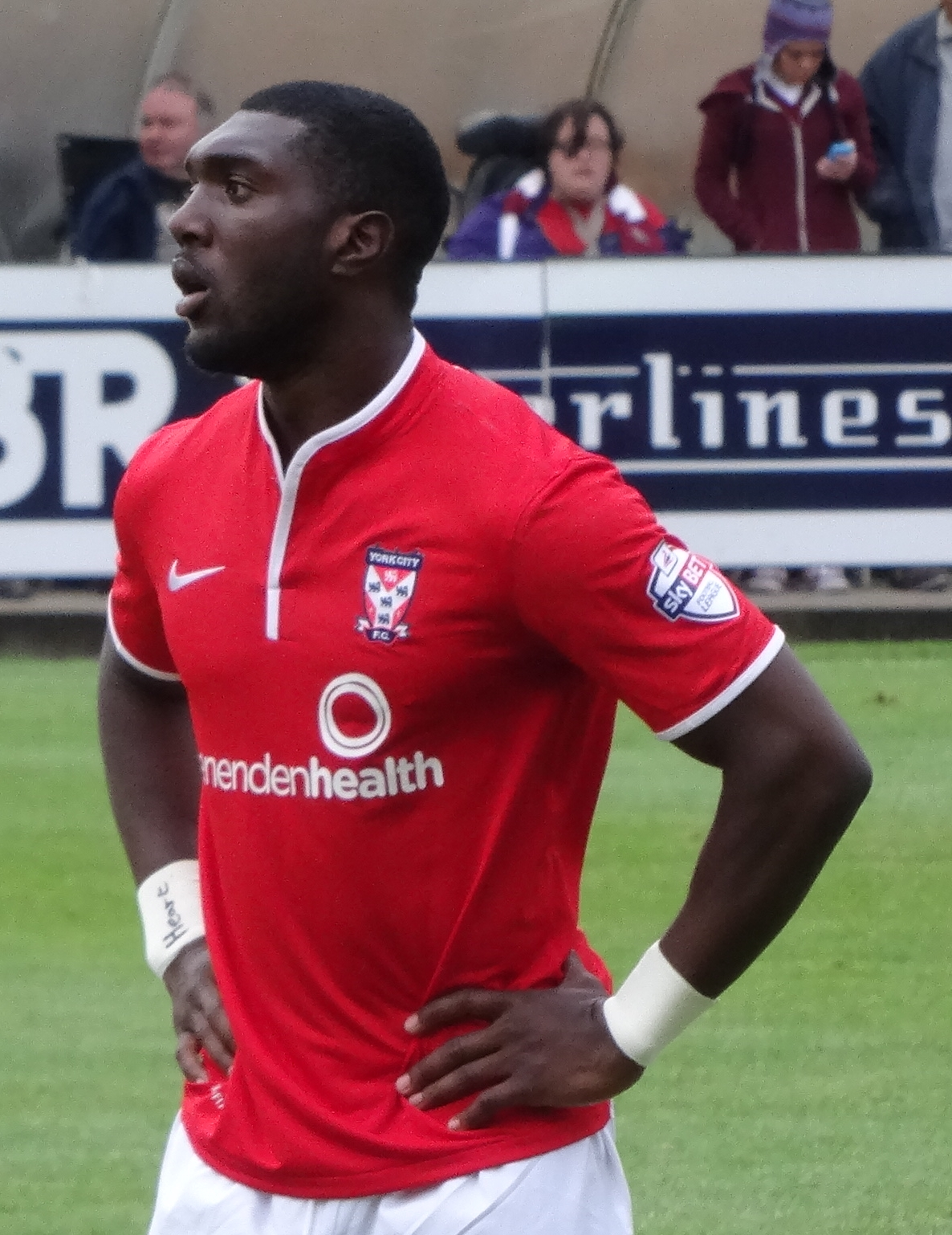
- Ilesanmi playing for York City in 2014

Personal information
- Full name: Oluwafemi Abayomi Alaba Ilesanmi
- Date of birth: 18 April 1991 (age 35)
- Place of birth: Southwark, England
- Height: 6 ft 1 in (1.85 m)
- Position: Defender

Team information
- Current team: Dorking Wanderers
- Number: 21

Youth career
- –2007: AFC Wimbledon

Senior career*
| Years | Team | Apps | (Gls) |
| 2007–2008 | AFC Wimbledon | 0 | (0) |
| 2008–2009 | Queens Park Rangers | 0 | (0) |
| 2010 | Ashford Town (Middlesex) | 12 | (2) |
| 2010–2014 | Dagenham & Redbridge | 117 | (1) |
| 2010 | → Histon (loan) | 16 | (0) |
| 2014–2016 | York City | 70 | (0) |
| 2016–2017 | Boreham Wood | 43 | (0) |
| 2017–2018 | Dover Athletic | 45 | (2) |
| 2018–2026 | Boreham Wood | 304 | (8) |
| 2026– | Dorking Wanderers | 7 | (0) |
- * Club domestic league appearances and goals as of 12:41, 31 October 2026 (UTC)

Oluwafemi Abayomi Alaba "Femi" Ilesanmi (born 18 April 1991) is an English professional footballer who plays as a defender for National League South club Dorking Wanderers.

Ilesanmi started his career with AFC Wimbledon's youth system, making his first-team debut in 2007 before transferring to Queens Park Rangers in 2008, where he played for the under-18 team. He spent a year at QPR where he also played for the reserve team, before his release. He signed for Isthmian League Premier Division club Ashford Town (Middlesex) in February 2010. His form prompted newly promoted League One club Dagenham & Redbridge to sign him in May 2010. He spent three months on loan at Conference Premier club Histon in 2010. Ilesanmi spent four years with Dagenham & Redbridge before joining York City in May 2014, where he played for two seasons before being released.

== Club career ==
=== Early career ===
Ilesanmi was born in Southwark, London to Nigerian parents. He started his career with AFC Wimbledon in their youth system. Despite his young age, he made a handful of appearances for the reserve team and also made his first-team debut aged 16 in an Isthmian League Cup match against Whyteleafe in October 2007. He spent nearly a full season with Wimbledon before moving to Queens Park Rangers' under-18 team in 2008. He spent a season at Loftus Road, featuring for both the youth team and the reserves before being released in 2009. After his release he joined League Two club Dagenham & Redbridge on non-contract terms. Whilst on trial he featured several times for the reserves. He also had a brief spell spent on trial at Conference Premier club Salisbury City, where he played for the reserves.

In February 2010, he signed for Isthmian League Premier Division club Ashford Town (Middlesex), where he spent a short spell. Ilesanmi scored his first goal for Ashford in a 2–1 home defeat to Carshalton Athletic. During the last few months of the 2009–10 season, Dagenham & Redbridge monitored Ilesanmi's performances. His last goal for the club came in the final match of the season, when he scored a bizarre goal from an attempted cross which put Ashford in the lead against Harrow Borough. However, Ashford went on to lose the match 6–2 and were relegated for the first time in their history. Ilesanmi made 12 appearances for Ashford, scoring two goals.

=== Dagenham & Redbridge ===
Dagenham & Redbridge were impressed with his performances at Ashford and again offered him a trial period with the club. The trial was successful and Ilesanmi signed a two-year contract with the newly promoted League One club in July 2010. In August 2010, he was sent out on loan to Conference Premier club Histon on an initial one-month loan with a view to extending further. His debut came on the opening day of the season in a 3–1 win over Barrow at home. He was sent off in his second match for Histon, a defeat to AFC Wimbledon, receiving his second booking for dissent. After impressing Histon manager David Livermore during his first month at the club, his loan was extended for a further two months. His final match for Histon came in a 1–1 draw with Wrexham on 30 October, where he provided the assist for a stoppage time equaliser. Ilesanmi had become a fans favourite at the club and plans were being made to bring him back on loan in January 2011. He returned to Dagenham having played 17 matches in all competitions for Histon.

Upon his return to Dagenham in November 2010, Ilesanmi impressed manager John Still in a behind closed doors friendly. This persuaded him to hand Ilesanmi a surprise professional and league debut for Dagenham in a 1–0 defeat to Oldham Athletic, where he played in place of Damien McCrory. After his first six appearances, Ilesanmi signed a three-and-a-half-year contract extension until 2014. The club also decided to retain Ilesanmi and not send him back to Histon for a second loan spell. He cemented his place as first choice left back for Dagenham for the remainder of 2010–11. He received his first red card for Dagenham in March 2011, in a 1–1 draw with Leyton Orient when he brought down Paul-José M'Poku to concede a late penalty. The club appealed the red card as manager John Still believed that no contact was made. However, the appeal was rejected and Ilesanmi was suspended for two matches. Ilesanmi could not save Dagenham from relegation on the final match of the season when they lost 5–0 away to Peterborough United. Dagenham returned to League Two at the first time of asking after their only season in League One. Ilesanmi 25 appearances for Dagenham that season.

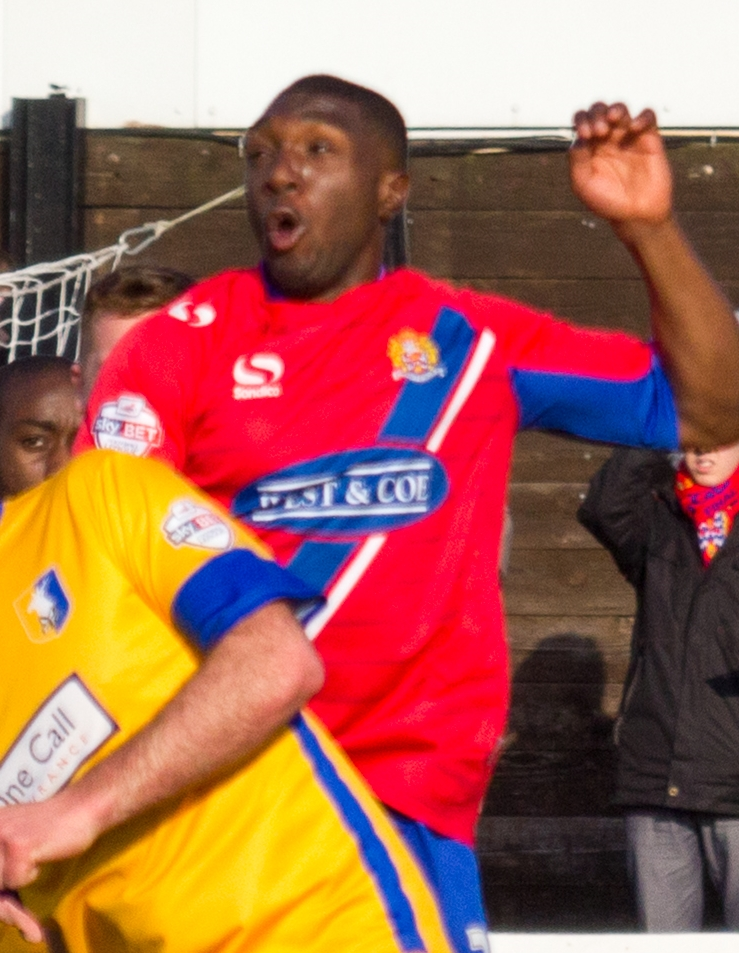
Ilesanmi playing for Dagenham & Redbridge in 2014

Ilesanmi started 2011–12 as understudy to Damien McCrory, making his first appearance of the season in the League Cup, a 5–0 defeat to AFC Bournemouth. His first league appearance of the season came in a 1–0 home defeat to Oxford United. He returned to the first team line-up in November 2011, which coincided with the club losing nine straight league matches. He remained first choice until February 2012, when he started in a 5–0 home defeat to Cheltenham Town. This proved to be his final appearance of the season, as Dagenham narrowly escaped successive relegation's to the Conference Premier. He made 26 appearances.

In May 2012, manager John Still made Ilesanmi available for transfer. After being transfer listed, Ilesanmi took it on himself to prove the management staff wrong by staying behind for extra training. He started the first match of the season in the League Cup, a 1–0 home defeat to Coventry City. He also started the first league match of the season, a 2–0 away defeat to Cheltenham Town. In November 2012, he thanked John Still for the transfer listing which gave him the "kick up the backside he needed", and resulted in him starting the season in fine form. This also included a fine performance in the 5–0 win over Rotherham United, where he provided two assists. His first professional goal and his first for Dagenham came in February 2013, a 2–1 defeat to league leaders Gillingham. He still remained first choice left back after the departure of manager John Still to Luton Town. Dagenham again narrowly avoided relegation to the Conference, this time on the final day of the season, despite losing 1–0 to York City. Ilesanmi played in every Dagenham match in the season, making 50 appearances scoring one goal.

Ilesanmi remained the first-choice left back for 2013–14. He started in Wayne Burnett's first match in full charge of Dagenham, a 3–1 away defeat to Fleetwood Town. In September 2013, he lost his place in the first team to young defender Jack Connors, who thrived during his spell in the team. Ilesanmi came back into the side for a Football League Trophy tie against Peterborough United. He played well despite Dagenham losing 1–0 and regained his first team place. Having made 32 appearances in 2013–14, Ilesanmi was released by Dagenham in May 2014, with Burnett saying "it was also the right time for him to move on, he's been a fantastic servant for this football club and I wish him every success".

=== York City ===
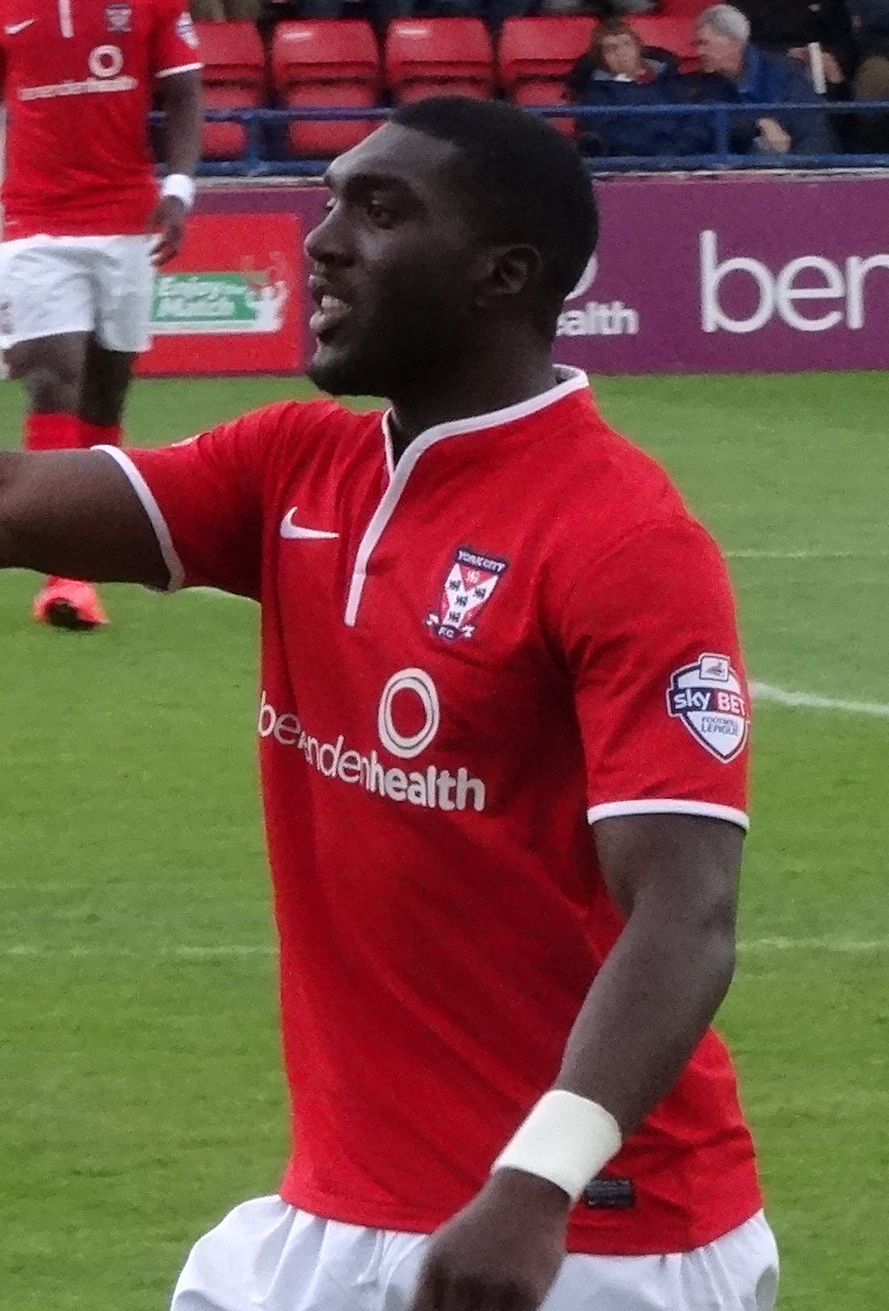
Ilesanmi playing for York City in 2014

Ilesanmi joined League Two York City on 22 May 2014 on a two-year contract. He made his debut in York's 1–1 away draw with Tranmere Rovers in the opening match of 2014–15 on 9 August 2014. Ilesanmi was released by York at the end of 2015–16.

=== Boreham Wood and Dover Athletic ===
Ilesanmi joined National League club Boreham Wood on 5 August 2016, and was an unused substitute the following day in their 1–0 home win over Forest Green Rovers. His debut came on 13 August 2016, as a 76th-minute substitute for Adriano Moke in a 1–1 away draw with York. Ilesanmi made 51 appearances in 2016–17 as Boreham Wood finished 11th in the National League. He was released at the end of the season.

On 27 June 2017, Ilesanmi signed for National League club Dover Athletic on a one-year contract. He made his debut on 5 August 2017 in a 1–0 victory away to Hartlepool United.

Ilesanmi re-signed for National League club Boreham Wood on 25 June 2018.

=== Dorking Wanderers ===
On 3 September 2026, Ilesanmi agreed to join National League South side Dorking Wanderers following his departure from Boreham Wood.

== Style of play ==
Ilesanmi primarily plays at left back but is capable of playing at centre back and left wing-back.

== Other ventures ==
Ilesamni and Jamal Fyfield run a podcast called "Beyond The 92", where they talk about the National League.

== Career statistics ==
As of match played 27 October 2026

Appearances and goals by club, season and competition
| Club | Season | League | | | FA Cup | | League Cup | | Other | | Total | |
| Club | Season | Division | Apps | Goals | Apps | Goals | Apps | Goals | Apps | Goals | Apps | Goals |
|---|---|---|---|---|---|---|---|---|---|---|---|---|
| AFC Wimbledon | 2007–08 | Isthmian League Premier Division | 0 | 0 | 0 | 0 | — | | 1 (Note: Appearance in Isthmian League Cup) | 0 | 1 | 0 |
| Ashford Town (Middlesex) | 2009–10 | Isthmian League Premier Division | 12 | 2 | — | | — | | — | | 12 | 2 |
| Dagenham & Redbridge | 2010–11 | League One | 25 | 0 | — | | 0 | 0 | — | | 25 | 0 |
| Dagenham & Redbridge | 2011–12 | League Two | 17 | 0 | 6 | 0 | 1 | 0 | 2 (Note: Appearance(s) in Football League Trophy) | 0 | 26 | 0 |
| Dagenham & Redbridge | 2012–13 | League Two | 46 | 1 | 1 | 0 | 1 | 0 | 2 | 0 | 50 | 1 |
| Dagenham & Redbridge | 2013–14 | League Two | 29 | 0 | 0 | 0 | 1 | 0 | 2 | 0 | 32 | 0 |
| Dagenham & Redbridge | Total | | 117 | 1 | 7 | 0 | 3 | 0 | 6 | 0 | 133 | 1 |
| Histon (loan) | 2010–11 | Conference Premier | 16 | 0 | 1 | 0 | — | | — | | 17 | 0 |
| York City | 2014–15 | League Two | 33 | 0 | 2 | 0 | 1 | 0 | 1 | 0 | 37 | 0 |
| York City | 2015–16 | League Two | 37 | 0 | 1 | 0 | 1 | 0 | 2 | 0 | 41 | 0 |
| York City | Total | | 70 | 0 | 3 | 0 | 2 | 0 | 3 | 0 | 78 | 0 |
| Boreham Wood | 2016–17 | National League | 43 | 0 | 2 | 0 | — | | 6 (Note: Appearances in FA Trophy) | 0 | 51 | 0 |
| Dover Athletic | 2017–18 | National League | 45 | 2 | 2 | 0 | — | | 3 | 0 | 50 | 2 |
| Boreham Wood | 2018–19 | National League | 43 | 1 | 2 | 0 | — | | 3 (Note: Two appearances in FA Trophy, one in Scottish Challenge Cup) | 0 | 48 | 1 |
| Boreham Wood | 2019–20 | National League | 35 | 0 | 1 | 0 | — | | 3 (Note: One appearance in FA Trophy, two in National League play-offs) | 0 | 39 | 0 |
| Boreham Wood | 2020–21 | National League | 40 | 1 | 4 | 0 | — | | 1 | 0 | 45 | 1 |
| Boreham Wood | 2021–22 | National League | 15 | 0 | 2 | 0 | — | | 0 | 0 | 17 | 0 |
| Boreham Wood | 2022–23 | National League | 46 | 3 | 5 | 0 | — | | 1 | 0 | 52 | 3 |
| Boreham Wood | 2023–24 | National League | 46 | 0 | 2 | 0 | — | | 1 | 0 | 49 | 0 |
| Boreham Wood | 2024–25 | National League South | 39 | 2 | 4 | 0 | — | | 6 (Note: Three appearances in FA Trophy, three appearances and one goal in National League South play-offs) | 1 | 49 | 3 |
| Boreham Wood | 2025–26 | National League | 40 | 1 | 2 | 0 | — | | 9 (Note: Six appearances and one goal in National League Cup, three appearances in National League play-offs) | 1 | 51 | 2 |
| Boreham Wood | Total | | 304 | 8 | 22 | 0 | — | | 24 | 2 | 350 | 10 |
| Dorking Wanderers | 2026–27 | National League South | 7 | 0 | 4 | 0 | — | | 0 | 0 | 11 | 0 |
| Career total | | | 614 | 13 | 41 | 0 | 5 | 0 | 43 | 2 | 703 | 15 |

== Honours ==
Boreham Wood

- National League South play-offs: 2025
