= Jake Reed (footballer) =

English association football player

Personal information
- Full name: Jake Reed
- Date of birth: 13 May 1991 (age 35)
- Place of birth: Gorleston-on-Sea, England
- Height: 5 ft 11 in (1.80 m)
- Position: Forward

Team information
- Current team: Gorleston

Youth career
- Blundeston Magpies
- Gorleston
- 2007–2008: Great Yarmouth Town

Senior career*
Years	Team	Apps	(Gls)
2008–2011	Great Yarmouth Town	102	(48)
2011–2013	Dagenham & Redbridge	31	(1)
2013–2014	Lowestoft Town	33	(18)
2014	AFC Sudbury	6	(3)
2014–2018	Lowestoft Town	139	(51)
2018–2019	Leiston	31	(14)
2019–2024	Lowestoft Town	142	(98)
2024–	Gorleston	17	(8)
- * Club domestic league appearances and goals as of 13:17, 12 July 2025

Jake Reed (born 13 May 1991) is an English semi-professional footballer who plays as a forward for Isthmian League Division One North side Gorleston.

== Early life ==
Reed grew up in Lowestoft and attended Benjamin Britten High School. He played youth football for Blundeston Magpies and Gorleston.

== Career ==
Reed progressed through Great Yarmouth Town's youth system, before making his first-team debut on 5 April 2008, aged 16. Reed's 20 league goals during the 2009-10 season helped Great Yarmouth Town to the Eastern Counties First Division title and promotion to the Eastern Counties Premier Division for the first time since 2005. In total, Reed scored 51 goals in 110 appearances for Great Yarmouth Town.

On 26 July 2011, Reed signed a two-year professional contract for League Two club Dagenham & Redbridge. He made his professional debut on 9 August 2011, coming on as a substitute in their 5–0 away loss to Bournemouth in the Football League Cup Second Round. Reed signed a two-year contract extension with Dagenham & Redbridge on 3 January 2013. He came off the bench to score his first professional goal on 1 April 2013 in a 4–2 home loss to Bristol Rovers. On 1 October 2013, Reed's contract was terminated by mutual consent.

He quickly signed for hometown club Lowestoft Town in the Isthmian League Premier Division. Reed scored 18 goals in 33 league games in the 2013-14 season, including 4 goals on his home debut in a 5-0 win against Carshalton Athletic. Lowestoft Town entered the play-offs having lost the previous three play-off finals in a row. Reed scored the winning goal in a 2-1 win away at Bognor Regis Town in the play-off semi-finals. He also scored in a 3-0 home win against AFC Hornchurch in the play-off final to secure Lowestoft Town's promotion to the Conference North for the first time in their history. However, he left the club at the end of the season, dropping two divisions to sign for Isthmian League Division One North club AFC Sudbury on 12 June 2014.

But, after just a few months at AFC Sudbury, Reed returned to Lowestoft Town on 19 September 2014. He scored 10 goals in 31 league appearances during the 2014-15 season as Lowestoft Town secured a 16th-place finish and retained their Conference North place for the following season. Reed also came off the bench to score an extra time winning goal as Lowestoft Town defeated Whitton United 2-1 in the 2014-15 Suffolk Premier Cup Final.

Reed scored 15 goals in 31 league appearances during the 2015-16 campaign, but an injury towards the end of the season meant he missed key games as Lowestoft Town were relegated from the National League North on goal difference. Reed also missed the 2015-16 Suffolk Premier Cup Final victory over Leiston at Portman Road.

On 6 March 2018, with Lowestoft Town struggling near the bottom of the Isthmian League Premier Division, Reed left the club for a second time and signed for local rivals Leiston. He started as Leiston won the Suffolk Premier Cup for the first time in their history with a 3-0 win over Bury Town at Portman Road.

On 1 February 2019, after 17 goals in 40 appearances for Leiston, Reed rejoined Lowestoft Town for a third time. At the time of his arrival, having won just five of their opening 27 league games, Lowestoft Town sat in the relegation zone of the Southern League Premier Division Central. But, Reed's 14 goals in 13 league appearances, including three hat-tricks, inspired the club to a further nine victories and a 14th-place finish.

The 2019-20 and 2020-21 seasons were both abandoned due to the coronavirus pandemic, before Lowestoft Town were relegated from the Southern Premier Division Central at the end of the 2021-22 season. Reed's 14 goals in 32 league appearances were not enough to keep Lowestoft Town from finishing bottom of the league and being relegated back to the Isthmian League Division One North for the first time in 12 years.

Reed scored 23 goals in 32 league appearances during the 2022-23 season as Lowestoft Town finished in 3rd place. The club's promotion hopes were ended in the play-offs with a 2-0 semi-final defeat at home to Heybridge Swifts.

In 2023-24, Reed scored a career best 30 goals in 31 league appearances to finish as the Isthmian League Division One North top goalscorer (joint with Bury Town's Cemal Ramadan). Lowestoft Town were crowned champions and promoted back to Step 3.

== Career statistics ==
As of match played 27 April 2024

Appearances and goals by club, season and competition
Club	Season	League			FA Cup		League Cup		Other		Total	
Club	Season	Division	Apps	Goals	Apps	Goals	Apps	Goals	Apps	Goals	Apps	Goals
Great Yarmouth Town	2007-08	Eastern Counties First Division	1	0	—		—		0	0	1	0
Great Yarmouth Town	2008-09	Eastern Counties First Division	28	9	—		—		0	0	28	9
Great Yarmouth Town	2009-10	Eastern Counties First Division	35	20	—		—		6 (Note: 3 appearances and 1 goal in Eastern Counties League Challenge Cup and 3 appearances and 1 goal in Eastern Counties First Division Cup)	2	41	22
Great Yarmouth Town	2010-11	Eastern Counties Premier Division	38	19	—		—		2 (Note: Appearances in Football League Trophy)	1	40	20
Great Yarmouth Town	Total		102	48	0	0	0	0	8	3	110	51
Dagenham & Redbridge	2011–12	League Two	7	0	2	0	1	0	1 (Note: Appearances in Football League Trophy)	0	11	0
Dagenham & Redbridge	2012–13	League Two	22	1	0	0	1	0	1	0	24	1
Dagenham & Redbridge	2013–14	League Two	2	0	0	0	1	0	0	0	3	0
Dagenham & Redbridge	Total		31	1	2	0	3	0	2	0	38	1
Lowestoft Town	2013–14	Isthmian League Premier Division	33	18	0	0	—		3 (Note: 2 appearances and 2 goals in Isthmian League Premier Division play-offs, 1 appearance in Suffolk Premier Cup)	2	36	21
AFC Sudbury	2014–15	Isthmian League Division One North	6	3	3	0	—		0	0	9	3
Lowestoft Town	2014–15	Conference North	31	10	0	0	—		4 (Note: 1 appearance and 2 goals in FA Trophy, 3 appearances and 1 goal in Suffolk Premier Cup)	3	35	13
Lowestoft Town	2015–16	National League North	33	15	1	0	—		3 (Note: 2 appearances and 1 goal in FA Trophy, 1 in Suffolk Premier Cup)	1	37	16
Lowestoft Town	2016–17	Isthmian League Premier Division	43	22	0	0	—		3 (Note: 2 appearances and 1 goal in Suffolk Premier Cup, 1 in FA Trophy)	1	38	21
Lowestoft Town	2017–18	Isthmian League Premier Division	32	14	2	0	—		0	0	34	14
Lowestoft Town	Total		139	51	3	0	0	0	10	5	144	54
Leiston	2017–18	Isthmian League Premier Division	12	5	0	0	—		2 (Note: 2 appearances and 1 goal in Suffolk Premier Cup)	1	14	6
Leiston	2018–19	Southern League Premier Central	19	9	2	1	—		5 (Note: 3 appearances and 1 goal in FA Trophy, 2 in Southern League Cup)	1	26	11
Leiston	Total		31	14	2	1	0	0	7	2	40	17
Lowestoft Town	2018–19	Southern League Premier Central	13	14	0	0	—		1	0	14	14
Lowestoft Town	2019–20	Southern League Premier Central	27	15	3	2	—		3 (Note: 1 appearance and 1 goal in Suffolk Premier Cup, 1 in FA Trophy, 1 in Southern League Cup)	2	33	19
Lowestoft Town	2020–21	Southern League Premier Central	7	2	1	1	—		2 (Note: 2 appearances in FA Trophy)	0	10	3
Lowestoft Town	2021–22	Southern League Premier Central	32	14	1	0	—		1 (Note: 1 appearance in Suffolk Premier Cup)	0	34	14
Lowestoft Town	2022–23	Isthmian League Division One North	32	23	2	1	—		3 (Note: 1 appearance in Isthmian League Division One North play-offs, 2 appearances and 1 goal in FA Trophy)	1	37	25
Lowestoft Town	2023–24	Isthmian League Division One North	31	30	2	3	—		2 (Note: 2 appearances and 2goals in FA Trophy)	2	35	35
Lowestoft Town	Total		142	98	9	7	0	0	12	5	163	110
Career total			484	233	19	8	3	0	42	18	540	257

== Honours ==
Great Yarmouth Town

- Eastern Counties First Division: 2009-10

Lowestoft Town

- Isthmian League Premier Division play-offs: 2014
- Isthmian League Division One North: 2023-24
- Suffolk Premier Cup: 2014-15, 2015-16

Leiston

- Suffolk Premier Cup: 2017-18

Individual

- Isthmian League Division One North Golden Boot: 2023-24
