= 2011–12 Dagenham & Redbridge F.C. season =

Dagenham & Redbridge
2011–12 season
- Chairman: David Andrews
- Manager: John Still
- Stadium: Victoria Road
- Football League Two: 19th
- FA Cup: Third round
- Football League Cup: First round
- Football League Trophy: Second round
- Top goalscorer: League: Brian Woodall (11); All: Brian Woodall (13)
- Highest home attendance: 3,396 (v Millwall, FA Cup, 7 January 2012)
- Lowest home attendance: 1,225 (v Bath City, FA Cup, 12 November 2011)
- Average home league attendance: 2,091
Home colours	Away colours

The 2011–12 season is the 5th season in the Football League played by Dagenham & Redbridge F.C., an English football club based in Dagenham, Greater London. It is their first consecutive season in Football League Two after relegation from Football League One in 2011. The season covers the period from 1 July 2011 to 30 June 2012.

== Match results ==
League positions are sourced from Statto, while the remaining contents of each table are sourced from the references in the "Ref" column.

=== League table ===
Pos	Team	Pld	W	D	L	GF	GA	GD	Pts
17	Burton Albion	46	14	12	20	54	81	−27	54
18	Bradford City	46	12	14	20	54	59	−5	50
19	Dagenham & Redbridge	46	14	8	24	50	72	−22	50
20	Northampton Town	46	12	12	22	56	79	−23	48
21	Plymouth Argyle	46	10	16	20	47	64	−17	46

Updated to match(es) played on 5 May 2012. Source: BBC Sport
Rules for classification: 1) Points; 2) Goal difference; 3) Number of goals scored

=== League Two ===
Date	League position	Opponents	Venue	Result	Score F–A	Scorers	Attendance	Ref
6 August 2011	4th	Macclesfield Town	A	W	1–0	Elito 60'	1,566	
13 August 2011	15th	AFC Wimbledon	H	L	0–2		2,904	
16 August 2011	8th	Swindon Town	H	W	1–0	Arber 70' pen.	2,063	
20 August 2011	5th	Bradford City	A	W	1–0	Nurse 27'	9,594	
27 August 2011	5th	Torquay United	H	D	1–1	Williams 25'	2,012	
3 September 2011	8th	Hereford United	A	L	0–1		1,885	
10 September 2011	11th	Rotherham United	A	L	1–3	Doe 21'	3,286	
13 September 2011	17th	Oxford United	H	L	0–1		1,921	
17 September 2011	19th	Morecambe	H	L	1–2	Lee 73'	1,728	
24 September 2011	20th	Northampton Town	A	L	1–2	Lee 90+1'	4,274	
1 October 2011	20th	Crewe Alexandra	H	W	2–1	Williams 76', Rose 90+5'	1,725	
8 October 2011	20th	Cheltenham Town	A	L	1–2	Nurse 45+1'	2,814	
15 October 2011	20th	Plymouth Argyle	H	L	2–3	Doe 58', Nurse 68'	2,025	
22 October 2011	21st	Aldershot Town	H	L	2–5	Nurse 43', McCrory 80'	1,796	
25 October 2011	22nd	Crawley Town	A	L	1–3	Lee 9'	2,862	
29 October 2011	22nd	Bristol Rovers	A	L	0–2		5,475	
5 November 2011	22nd	Shrewsbury Town	H	L	0–2		1,726	
19 November 2011	23rd	Southend United	H	L	2–3	Montaño 13', Ogogo 49'	3,259	
26 November 2011	23rd	Accrington Stanley	A	L	0–3		1,308	
10 December 2011	24th	Port Vale	H	L	1–2	Woodall 23'	1,682	
17 December 2011	24th	Burton Albion	A	D	1–1	Spillane 26'	2,658	
26 December 2011	22nd	Barnet	H	W	3–0	Montaño (2) 14', 45', Woodall 63'	2,135	
30 December 2011	20th	Gillingham	H	W	2–1	Bingham 23', Woodall 65'	3,120	
2 January 2012	22nd	Southend United	A	D	1–1	Woodall 87'	7,564	
14 January 2012	22nd	Hereford United	H	L	0–1		1,732	
21 January 2012	23rd	Crewe Alexandra	A	L	1–4	Woodall 17'	3,282	
24 January 2012	23rd	Torquay United	A	L	0–1		2,280	
28 January 2012	22nd	Rotherham United	H	W	3–2	Nurse 50', Bradley 62' o.g., Doe 78'	1,744	
14 February 2012	23rd	Oxford United	A	L	1–2	Arber 73'	5,653	
18 February 2012	24th	Cheltenham Town	H	L	0–5		1,516	
25 February 2012	24th	Plymouth Argyle	A	D	0–0		7,804	
28 February 2012	23rd	Morecambe	A	W	2–1	Elito 13', Scott 71'	1,246	
3 March 2012	22nd	Bradford City	H	W	1–0	Saunders 71'	3,041	
6 March 2012	24th	Swindon Town	A	L	0–4		6,839	
10 March 2012	24th	AFC Wimbledon	A	L	1–2	Spillane 83'	4,243	
13 March 2012	24th	Northampton Town	H	L	0–1		2,164	
17 March 2012	24th	Macclesfield Town	H	W	2–0	Elito (2) 16', 90+6'	1,446	
20 March 2012	24th	Barnet	A	D	2–2	Spillane 25', Doe 72'	1,725	
24 March 2012	21st	Accrington Stanley	H	W	2–1	Woodall 85', Doe 90+2'	1,476	
31 March 2012	19th	Port Vale	A	W	1–0	Spillane 65'	4,127	
6 April 2012	18th	Burton Albion	H	D	1–1	Woodall 88'	2,035	
9 April 2012	19th	Gillingham	A	W	2–1	Woodall 38', Do. Green 73'	5,773	
14 April 2012	19th	Aldershot Town	A	D	1–1	Doe 60'	2,393	
21 April 2012	19th	Crawley Town	H	D	1–1	Bingham 45+1'	2,456	
28 April 2012	20th	Shrewsbury Town	A	L	0–1		9,441	
5 May 2012	19th	Bristol Rovers	H	W	4–0	Woodall (3) 24', 54', 81', Da. Green 64'	2,377	

=== FA Cup ===
Round	Date	Opponents	Venue	Result	Score F–A	Scorers	Attendance	Ref
First round	12 November 2011	Bath City	H	D	1–1	Woodall 41'	1,225	
First round replay	23 November 2011	Bath City	A	W	3–1 (a.e.t.)	Woodall 20', Nurse (2) 100', 115'	1,704	
Second round	3 December 2011	Walsall	H	D	1–1	Nurse 81'	1,237	
Second round replay	13 December 2011	Walsall	A	D	0–0 (a.e.t.) (3–2 p)		1,802	
Third round	7 January 2012	Millwall	H	D	0–0		3,396	
Third round replay	17 January 2012	Millwall	A	L	0–5		3,751	

=== League Cup ===
Round	Date	Opponents	Venue	Result	Score F–A	Scorers	Attendance	Ref
First round	9 August 2011	Bournemouth	A	L	0–5		3,681	

=== Football League Trophy ===
Round	Date	Opponents	Venue	Result	Score F–A	Scorers	Attendance	Ref
First round	7 September 2011	Leyton Orient	A	D	1–1 (14–13 p)	Williams 64'	1,420	
Second round	4 October 2011	Southend United	H	L	1–3	McCrory 66'	2,395	

== Player details ==
As of 20 October 2012.

Numbers in parentheses denote appearances as substitute.
Players with names struck through and marked † left the club during the playing season.
Players with names in italics and marked * were on loan from another club for the whole of their season with Dagenham & Redbridge.
Players listed with no appearances have been in the matchday squad but only as unused substitutes.
Key to positions: GK – Goalkeeper; DF – Defender; MF – Midfielder; FW – Forward

No.	Pos.	Nat.	Name	League		FA Cup		League Cup		FL Trophy		Total		Discipline	
No.	Pos.	Nat.	Name	Apps	Goals	Apps	Goals	Apps	Goals	Apps	Goals	Apps	Goals	A yellow rectangle, denoting the yellow penalty card shown to a player being cautioned	A red rectangle, denoting the red penalty card shown to a player being sent off
1	GK	ENG	~~James Shea *~~ †	0 (1)	0	1	0	1	0	1	0	3 (1)	0	2	0
1	GK	ENG	~~Jonathan Bond *~~ †	5	0	0	0	0	0	0	0	5	0	1	0
2	DF	ENG	Luke Wilkinson	0	0	0	0	0	0	0	0	0	0	0	0
3	DF	IRL	Damien McCrory	32 (1)	1	2	0	1	0	1	1	36 (1)	2	3	1
4	DF	ENG	Scott Doe	41	6	5	0	1	0	2	0	49	6	4	2
5	DF	ENG	Richard Rose	9 (1)	1	5	0	0	0	1 (1)	0	15 (2)	1	0	0
6	DF	ENG	Mark Arber	32 (1)	2	0	0	1	0	1	0	34 (1)	2	3	0
7	FW	ENG	Sam Williams	10	2	0	0	1	0	1	1	12	3	0	0
8	FW	ENG	Robert Edmans	0 (3)	0	0 (1)	0	0	0	0	0	0 (4)	0	0	0
9	FW	BRB	Jon Nurse	36 (3)	5	6	3	1	0	0	0	43 (3)	8	3	0
10	FW	ENG	Josh Scott	12 (8)	1	2 (2)	0	0	0	0	0	14 (10)	1	2	1
11	FW	ENG	Gavin Tomlin	15 (2)	0	1 (1)	0	1	0	2	0	19 (3)	0	1	0
12	MF	ENG	Medy Elito	20 (4)	4	0 (2)	0	1	0	0	0	21 (6)	4	1	0
14	FW	ENG	Jake Reed	1 (6)	0	0 (2)	0	0 (1)	0	0 (1)	0	1 (10)	0	1	0
15	MF	ENG	~~Damian Scannell~~ †	7 (7)	0	2	0	0	0	1	0	10 (7)	0	1	0
15	MF	IRL	~~Eoin Wearen *~~ †	0 (2)	0	1 (1)	0	0	0	0	0	1 (3)	0	0	0
15	MF	ENG	Matthew Saunders	5	1	0	0	0	0	0	0	5	1	0	0
16	MF	IRL	Kevin Maher	8	0	1	0	0	0	1	0	10	0	1	0
17	MF	ENG	Luke Howell	10	0	0	0	1	0	0	0	11	0	2	0
18	MF	ENG	~~Olly Lee *~~ †	15 (1)	3	0	0	0	0	1	0	16 (1)	3	2	0
18	DF	ENG	~~Exodus Geohaghon *~~ †	1 (1)	0	0	0	0	0	0	0	1 (1)	0	0	0
18	MF	ATG	Josh Parker *	6 (2)	0	0	0	0	0	0	0	6 (2)	0	0	0
19	DF	ENG	Abu Ogogo	40	1	6	0	1	0	1	0	48	1	8	1
20	FW	ENG	Dwight Gayle	0	0	0	0	0	0	0	0	0	0	0	0
21	MF	ENG	Danny Green	4 (4)	1	2 (1)	0	0 (1)	0	0 (2)	0	6 (8)	1	0	0
22	DF	ENG	Ian Gayle	0	0	0	0	0	0	0	0	0	0	0	0
23	FW	ENG	Brian Woodall	26 (13)	11	5	2	0 (1)	0	1	0	32 (14)	13	4	0
24	MF	ENG	Billy Bingham	17 (10)	2	2 (1)	0	0	0	2	0	21 (11)	2	0	0
25	DF	ENG	~~Adam Gemili~~ †	0	0	0	0	0	0	0	0	0	0	0	0
25	MF	NIR	~~Ben Reeves *~~ †	5	0	0	0	0	0	0	0	5	0	0	0
26	FW	ENG	Louis Dennis	0	0	0	0	0	0	0	0	0	0	0	0
27	GK	ENG	Dave Hogan	0 (1)	0	0	0	0	0	0	0	0 (1)	0	0	0
28	MF	ENG	Lee Wootton	0	0	0	0	0	0	0	0	0	0	0	0
29	DF	ENG	Femi Ilesanmi	17	0	6	0	1	0	1 (1)	0	25 (1)	0	2	0
30	GK	ENG	Chris Lewington	41	0	5	0	0	0	1	0	47	0	1	2
31	FW	ENG	Phil Walsh	4 (4)	0	1 (1)	0	0	0	2	0	7 (5)	0	0	0
32	DF	ENG	Duran Reynolds	0	0	0	0	0	0	0	0	0	0	0	0
33	MF	IRL	Peter Gain	16 (4)	0	4	0	0	0	1	0	21 (4)	0	3	0
34	FW	ENG	Alex Osborn	0	0	0	0	0	0	0	0	0	0	0	0
35	FW	ENG	Jon-Jo Bates	0	0	0	0	0	0	0	0	0	0	0	0
36	MF	NGA	~~Conor Okus~~ †	0	0	0	0	0	0	0	0	0	0	0	0
36	DF	FRA	Mathieu Baudry *	11	0	0	0	0	0	0	0	11	0	1	0
37	MF	ENG	Dominic Green	8 (8)	1	3 (1)	0	0	0	0	0	11 (9)	1	1	0
38	FW	ENG	~~Troy Hewitt *~~ †	3 (3)	0	0	0	0	0	1	0	4 (3)	0	0	0
38	FW	COL	~~Cristian Montaño *~~ †	10	3	0	0	0	0	0	0	10	3	3	0
38	FW	ENG	~~John Akinde *~~ †	4 (1)	0	0	0	0	0	0	0	4 (1)	0	0	0
40	GK	WAL	~~Tony Roberts~~ †	0	0	0	0	0	0	0	0	0	0	0	0
41	MF	IRL	Michael Spillane	29	4	4	0	0	0	0	0	33	4	6	0
42	FW	ENG	Adam Cunnington	2 (7)	0	0	0	0	0	0	0	2 (7)	0	0	0
43	MF	KSA	~~Ahmed Abdulla *~~ †	4 (1)	0	2	0	0	0	0	0	6 (1)	0	1	0
44	DF	ENG	~~Charlie Wassmer *~~ †	0 (1)	0	0	0	0	0	0	0	0 (1)	0	0	0

== Transfers ==
=== In ===
Date	Name	From	Fee	Ref
1 July 2011	Brian Woodall	Gresley	Free	
1 July 2011	Dwight Gayle	Stansted	Free	
1 July 2011	Medy Elito	Colchester United	Free	
26 July 2011	Robert Edmans	Chelmsford City	£6,000	
26 July 2011	Sam Williams	Yeovil Town	Free	
26 July 2011	Jake Reed	Great Yarmouth Town	Free	
1 August 2011	Richard Rose	Hereford United	Free	
1 August 2011	Luke Howell	Lincoln City	Free	
1 August 2011	Kevin Maher	Gillingham	Free	
1 September 2011	Dominic Green	Peterborough United	Free	
3 January 2012	Adam Cunnington	Kettering Town	Undisclosed	
5 January 2012	Michael Spillane	Brentford	Free	
10 February 2012	Matthew Saunders	Fulham	Free	
5 March 2012	Ahmed Abdulla	West Ham United	Free	

=== Out ===
Date	Name	To	Fee	Ref
1 July 2011	Danny Green	Charlton Athletic	Undisclosed	
15 July 2011	Romain Vincelot	Brighton & Hove Albion	Undisclosed	
26 July 2011	Tony Roberts		Retired	
2 September 2011	Conor Okus	Havant & Waterlooville	Free	
6 December 2011	Damian Scannell	Eastleigh	Free	
22 June 2012	Adam Cunnington		Released	
30 June 2012	Damien McCrory		Released	
30 June 2012	Mark Arber		Released	
30 June 2012	Jon Nurse		Released	
30 June 2012	Peter Gain		Released	
30 June 2012	Jon-Jo Bates		Released	
30 June 2012	Lee Wootton		Released	
30 June 2012	Ahmed Abdulla		Released	
30 June 2012	Phil Walsh		Released	
30 June 2012	Adam Gemili		Retired	
30 June 2012	Dave Hogan		Released	

=== Loans in ===
Date	Name	From	End date	Ref
26 July 2011	James Shea	Arsenal	5 December 2011	
5 August 2011	Oliver Lee	West Ham United	29 October 2011	
30 September 2011	Troy Hewitt	Queens Park Rangers	29 October 2011	
17 November 2011	Michael Spillane	Brentford	3 January 2012	
17 November 2011	Cristian Montaño	West Ham United	28 January 2012	
21 November 2011	Exodus Geohaghon	Darlington	5 February 2012	
24 November 2011	Adam Cunnington	Kettering Town	3 January 2012	
6 January 2012	Eoin Wearen	West Ham United	31 January 2012	
6 January 2012	Ahmed Abdulla	West Ham United	31 January 2012	
23 February 2012	Jonathan Bond	Watford	22 March 2012	
23 February 2012	Ben Reeves	Southampton	23 March 2012	
8 March 2012	Josh Parker	Oldham Athletic	5 May 2012	
12 March 2012	Mathieu Baudry	Bournemouth	5 May 2012	
17 March 2012	Charlie Wassmer	Crawley Town	12 April 2012	
17 March 2012	John Akinde	Crawley Town	12 April 2012	

=== Loans out ===
Date	Name	To	End date	Ref
13 August 2011	Dwight Gayle	Bishop's Stortford	End of season	
13 August 2011	Louis Dennis	Grays Athletic	24 March 2012	
13 August 2011	Luke Wilkinson	Boreham Wood	28 January 2012	
13 August 2011	Duran Reynolds	St Neots Town	23 September 2011	
18 August 2011	Ian Gayle	Grays Athletic	28 September 2011	
20 August 2011	Lee Wootton	Harrow Borough	End of season	
20 August 2011	Jon-Jo Bates	Harrow Borough	End of season	
25 August 2011	Adam Gemili	Thurrock	19 November 2011	
25 August 2011	Alex Osborn	Thurrock	21 January 2012	
3 October 2011	Duran Reynolds	Metropolitan Police	End of season	
11 October 2011	Ian Gayle	Kingstonian	End of season	
29 December 2011	Phil Walsh	Hayes & Yeading United	End of season	
12 January 2012	Gavin Tomlin	Gillingham	End of season	
26 January 2012	Alex Osborn	Chelmsford City	End of season	
23 February 2012	Luke Wilkinson	Dartford	End of season	
8 March 2012	Danny Green	Dover Athletic	27 March 2012	
9 March 2012	Adam Cunnington	Alfreton Town	End of season	
22 March 2012	Robert Edmans	Dover Athletic	End of season	

== Awards ==
End of Season Awards	Winner
Player of the Season	Michael Spillane
Goal of the Season	Billy Bingham vs Crawley Town
