= 2012–13 Dagenham & Redbridge F.C. season =

Dagenham & Redbridge
2012–13 season
- Chairman: David Andrews
- Manager: John Still (until 25 February 2013); Wayne Burnett (from 25 February 2013)
- Stadium: Victoria Road
- League Two: 22nd
- FA Cup: First round
- League Cup: First round
- Football League Trophy: Second round
- Top goalscorer: League: Luke Howell (9); All: Luke Howell (9)
- Highest home attendance: 3,781 (v York City, League Two, 27 April 2013)
- Lowest home attendance: 981 (v Stevenage, Football League Trophy, 4 September 2012
- Average home league attendance: 1,903
Home colours	Away colours

The 2012–13 season is the 6th season in the Football League played by Dagenham & Redbridge F.C., an English football club based in Dagenham, Greater London. It is their second consecutive season in Football League Two after relegation from Football League One in 2011. The season covers the period from 1 July 2012 to 30 June 2013.

== League table ==
Twenty-four teams contest the division: 18 sides remaining in the division from last season, four relegated from League One, and two promoted from Conference National.

Pos	Team	Pld	W	D	L	GF	GA	GD	Pts	Promotion, qualification or relegation
20	AFC Wimbledon	46	14	11	21	54	76	−22	53	
21	Plymouth Argyle	46	13	13	20	46	55	−9	52	
22	Dagenham & Redbridge	46	13	12	21	55	62	−7	51	
23	Barnet (R)	46	13	12	21	47	59	−12	51	Relegation to the Conference Premier
24	Aldershot Town (R)	46	11	15	20	42	60	−18	48	Relegation to the Conference Premier

Updated to match(es) played on 27 April 2013. Source: BBC Sport
Rules for classification: 1) Points; 2) Goal difference; 3) Number of goals scored
(R) Relegated

== Match results ==
League positions are sourced from Statto, while the remaining contents of each table are sourced from the references in the "Ref" column.

=== League Two ===
Date	League position	Opponents	Venue	Result	Score F–A	Scorers	Attendance	Ref
18 August 2012	19th	Cheltenham Town	A	L	0–2		2,655	
21 August 2012	21st	Plymouth Argyle	H	D	0–0		1,878	
25 August 2012	22nd	Gillingham	H	L	1–2	D. Gayle 34' pen.	2,251	
1 September 2012	22nd	AFC Wimbledon	A	D	2–2	Spillane 28', Howell 56'	3,507	
8 September 2012	22nd	Southend United	A	L	1–3	D. Gayle 45+2'	5,348	
15 September 2012	22nd	Accrington Stanley	H	D	1–1	Howell 61'	1,529	
18 September 2012	22nd	Northampton Town	H	L	0–1		1,429	
22 September 2012	22nd	Rochdale	A	D	2–2	Spillane 60' pen., Williams 68'	2,120	
29 September 2012	20th	Wycombe Wanderers	H	W	3–0	D. Gayle 26', Spillane 57' pen., Bingham 89'	1,680	
2 October 2012	19th	Port Vale	A	D	1–1	Howell 72'	4,355	
6 October 2012	18th	Bradford City	H	W	4–3	Bingham 5', Spillane 29', Wilkinson 50', D. Gayle 76'	1,768	
13 October 2012	17th	Chesterfield	A	W	2–1	Williams (2) 42', 57'	5,082	
20 October 2012	19th	York City	A	L	2–3	Wilkinson (2) 23', 90+2'	3,391	
23 October 2012	19th	Exeter City	H	D	1–1	Elito 37'	1,487	
27 October 2012	19th	Aldershot Town	H	D	0–0		1,771	
6 November 2012	15th	Oxford United	A	W	3–2	Williams 36', Howell 54', Wilkinson 62'	5,074	
10 November 2012	14th	Rotherham United	H	W	5–0	D. Gayle (2) 5', 90+1', Howell (2) 35', 75', Elito 81'	1,720	
17 November 2012	14th	Burton Albion	A	L	2–3	D. Gayle 29', Williams 78'	2,369	
24 November 2012	15th	Fleetwood Town	H	W	1–0	Williams 90+3' pen.	1,618	
1 December 2012	16th	Torquay United	A	L	1–2	Saunders 73'	2,069	
8 December 2012	14th	Bristol Rovers	A	W	1–0	Williams 19'	4,874	
15 December 2012	12th	Barnet	H	W	1–0	Saunders 17'	2,020	
26 December 2012	14th	Southend United	H	L	0–3		3,555	
29 December 2012	15th	Port Vale	H	L	2–3	Williams 17' pen., Doe 84'	1,697	
1 January 2013	16th	Northampton Town	A	L	1–3	Doe 71'	4,368	
5 January 2013	14th	Accrington Stanley	A	W	2–0	Saunders 21', Howell 52'	1,031	
8 January 2013	14th	Morecambe	A	L	1–2	Woodall 7'	4,029	
12 January 2013	13th	Rochdale	H	W	2–1	Ogogo 75', Elito 90+3'	2,289	
19 January 2013	13th	Wycombe Wanderers	A	L	0–1		2,365	
26 January 2013	14th	Morecambe	H	L	1–2	Wilkinson 61'	1,370	
2 February 2013	14th	Plymouth Argyle	A	D	0–0		6,234	
9 February 2013	13th	Cheltenham Town	H	W	1–0	Howell 58'	1,526	
16 February 2013	15th	Gillingham	A	L	1–2	Ilesanmi 52'	5,611	
23 February 2013	16th	AFC Wimbledon	H	L	0–1		2,265	
27 February 2013	15th	Bradford City	A	D	1–1	Howell 69'	10,006	
2 March 2013	15th	Chesterfield	H	L	0–1		1,675	
9 March 2013	15th	Rotherham United	A	W	2–1	Elito 59' pen., Wilkinson 82'	7,309	
12 March 2013	16th	Torquay United	H	D	2–2	Elito 5' pen., Scott 86'	1,227	
16 March 2013	16th	Burton Albion	H	D	1–1	Scott 51'	1,364	
23 March 2013	17th	Fleetwood Town	A	L	1–2	Elito 5' pen.	2,019	
29 March 2013	16th	Barnet	A	D	0–0		3,680	
1 April 2013	17th	Bristol Rovers	H	L	2–4	Strevens 28', Reed 73'	2,082	
6 April 2013	17th	Exeter City	A	W	1–0	Doe 4'	3,755	
13 April 2013	17th	Oxford United	H	L	0–1		1,788	
20 April 2013	21st	Aldershot Town	A	L	0–1		2,861	
27 April 2013	22nd	York City	H	L	0–1		3,781	

=== FA Cup ===
Round	Date	Opponents	Venue	Result	Score F–A	Scorers	Attendance	Ref
First round	3 November 2012	Bournemouth	A	L	0–4		5,827	

=== League Cup ===
Round	Date	Opponents	Venue	Result	Score F–A	Scorers	Attendance	Ref
First round	11 August 2012	Coventry City	H	L	0–1		1,904	

=== Football League Trophy ===
Round	Date	Opponents	Venue	Result	Score F–A	Scorers	Attendance	Ref
First round	4 September 2012	Stevenage	H	W	3–2	Woodall 12', Scott 31', Spillane 35' pen.	981	
Second round	9 October 2012	Southend United	A	L	0–2		2,965	

== Player details ==
As of match played 27 April 2013.

Numbers in parentheses denote appearances as substitute.
Players with names struck through and marked † left the club during the playing season.
Players with names in italics and marked * were on loan from another club for the whole of their season with Dagenham & Redbridge.
Players listed with no appearances have been in the matchday squad but only as unused substitutes.
Key to positions: GK – Goalkeeper; DF – Defender; MF – Midfielder; FW – Forward

No.	Pos.	Nat.	Name	League		FA Cup		League Cup		FL Trophy		Total		Discipline	
No.	Pos.	Nat.	Name	Apps	Goals	Apps	Goals	Apps	Goals	Apps	Goals	Apps	Goals	A yellow rectangle, denoting the yellow penalty card shown to a player being cautioned	A red rectangle, denoting the red penalty card shown to a player being sent off
1	GK	ENG	Chris Lewington	41	0	1	0	1	0	2	0	45	0	1	0
2	DF	ENG	Luke Wilkinson	42 (1)	6	1	0	0	0	2	0	45 (1)	6	7	1
3	DF	ENG	Femi Ilesanmi	46	1	1	0	1	0	2	0	50	1	5	0
4	DF	ENG	Scott Doe	46	3	1	0	1	0	2	0	50	3	4	0
6	DF	IRL	~~Michael Spillane~~ †	24	4	1	0	1	0	1	1	27	5	5	0
7	FW	ENG	Sam Williams	29 (4)	8	1	0	0 (1)	0	0 (1)	0	30 (6)	8	4	0
8	FW	ENG	~~Robert Edmans~~ †	0 (1)	0	0	0	0	0	0	0	0 (1)	0	0	0
8	MF	POR	Toni Silva *	4	0	0	0	0	0	0	0	4	0	0	0
9	MF	ENG	~~Josh Wakefield *~~ †	0	0	0	0	0	0	0	0	0	0	0	0
9	FW	ENG	Ben Strevens	10 (4)	1	0	0	0	0	0	0	10 (4)	1	1	0
10	FW	ENG	Josh Scott	11 (7)	2	0	0	1	0	1	1	13 (7)	3	0	0
11	MF	ENG	Dominic Green	1 (9)	0	0	0	0	0	1 (1)	0	2 (10)	0	0	0
12	MF	ENG	Medy Elito	43 (3)	6	1	0	1	0	1	0	46 (3)	6	2	0
14	FW	ENG	Jake Reed	12 (10)	1	0	0	0 (1)	0	1	0	13 (11)	1	0	0
15	MF	ENG	Matthew Saunders	32	3	1	0	0	0	1	0	34	3	3	0
16	MF	IRL	Kevin Maher	7 (1)	0	0	0	0	0	0	0	7 (1)	0	2	1
17	MF	ENG	Luke Howell	46	9	1	0	1	0	2	0	50	9	6	0
18	DF	TRI	Gavin Hoyte	23 (3)	0	0 (1)	0	1	0	2	0	26 (4)	0	5	0
19	MF	ENG	Abu Ogogo	46	1	1	0	1	0	1	0	49	1	6	0
20	FW	ENG	~~Dwight Gayle~~ †	16 (2)	7	1	0	0	0	0 (1)	0	17 (3)	7	3	0
20	DF	ENG	Jonathan Fortune	0 (1)	0	0	0	0	0	0	0	0 (1)	0	0	0
21	MF	ENG	~~Danny Green~~ †	0 (6)	0	0	0	0	0	1 (1)	0	1 (7)	0	0	0
21	DF	ENG	~~Jake Caprice *~~ †	0 (8)	0	0	0	0	0	0	0	0 (8)	0	0	0
21	MF	ENG	Mo Shariff *	1 (3)	0	0	0	0	0	0	0	1 (3)	0	0	0
22	DF	ENG	Ian Gayle	0	0	0	0	0	0	0	0	0	0	0	0
23	FW	ENG	Brian Woodall	9 (19)	1	0 (1)	0	1	0	2	1	12 (20)	2	0	0
24	MF	ENG	Billy Bingham	12 (6)	2	0	0	1	0	0 (1)	0	13 (7)	2	1	0
25	DF	IRL	Andrew Burns	0	0	0	0	0	0	0	0	0	0	0	0
26	FW	ENG	Louis Dennis	0 (6)	0	0	0	0	0	0	0	0 (6)	0	0	0
27	GK	ENG	Cain Davies	0	0	0	0	0	0	0	0	0	0	0	0
28	DF	POR	Ricardo Santos	0	0	0	0	0	0	0	0	0	0	0	0
29	MF	ENG	Darren Currie	0	0	0	0	0	0	0	0	0	0	0	0
30	GK	ENG	Jordan Seabright	3 (1)	0	0 (1)	0	0	0	0	0	3 (2)	0	0	0
31	FW	ITA	Gianluca Gracco	0 (1)	0	0	0	0	0	0	0	0 (1)	0	0	0
32	DF	ENG	Duran Reynolds	0	0	0	0	0	0	0	0	0	0	0	0
33	MF	ENG	Tom Davie	0	0	0	0	0	0	0	0	0	0	0	0
34	FW	ENG	Alex Osborn	0	0	0	0	0	0	0	0	0	0	0	0
35	MF	NIR	Sean Shields	0 (1)	0	0	0	0	0	0	0	0 (1)	0	0	0
36	DF	WAL	Peter Gilbert *	0	0	0	0	0	0	0	0	0	0	0	0
37	GK	ENG	Jonathan Miles *	2	0	0	0	0	0	0	0	2	0	0	0

== Transfers ==
=== In ===
Date	Name	From	Fee	Ref
10 July 2012	Gavin Hoyte	Arsenal	Free	
15 August 2012	Andrew Burns	Bradford City	Free	
17 August 2012	Jordan Seabright	Bournemouth	Free	
23 December 2012	Gianluca Gracco	Unattached	Free	
7 January 2013	Sean Shields	St Albans City	Free	
31 January 2013	Ben Strevens	Gillingham	Free	
28 March 2013	Jonathan Fortune	Chatham Town	Free	

=== Out ===
Date	Name	To	Fee	Ref
9 July 2012	Adam Cunnington	Tamworth	Free	
6 August 2012	Richard Rose	Dartford	Free	
15 October 2012	Danny Green	AFC Sudbury	Released	
2 January 2013	Dwight Gayle	Peterborough United	£470,000	
17 January 2013	Michael Spillane	Southend United	Undisclosed	
31 January 2013	Robert Edmans	Chelmsford City	Released	
30 June 2013	Sam Williams		Released	
30 June 2013	Kevin Maher	Bray Wanderers	Released	
30 June 2013	Dominic Green	Ebbsfleet United	Released	
30 June 2013	Tom Davie	Barkingside	Released	
30 June 2013	Andrew Burns	Barrow	Released	
30 June 2013	Duran Reynolds	Barrow	Released	
30 June 2013	Ben Strevens	Eastleigh	Released	
30 June 2013	Jonathan Fortune		Released	

=== Loans in ===
Date	Name	From	End date	Ref
13 November 2012	Jake Caprice	Blackpool	9 March 2013	
22 November 2012	Josh Wakefield	Bournemouth	1 January 2013	
28 March 2013	Toni Silva	Barnsley	23 April 2013	
28 March 2013	Jonathan Miles	Tottenham Hotspur	30 June 2013	
28 March 2013	Peter Gilbert	Lincoln City	30 June 2013	
28 March 2013	Mo Sharif	Queens Park Rangers	30 June 2013	

=== Loans out ===
Date	Name	To	End date	Ref
10 August 2012	Robert Edmans	Macclesfield Town	27 August 2012	
17 August 2012	Alex Osborn	Billericay Town	1 January 2013	
17 August 2012	Ian Gayle	Histon	25 October 2012	
17 August 2012	Andrew Burns	Kettering Town	2 November 2012	
28 August 2012	Duran Reynolds	Billericay Town	20 October 2012	
9 October 2012	Tom Davie	Harlow Town	12 January 2013	
15 October 2012	Louis Dennis	Canvey Island	12 January 2013	
18 October 2012	Robert Edmans	Chelmsford City	15 December 2012	
2 November 2012	Duran Reynolds	AFC Hornchurch	1 January 2013	
6 November 2012	Andrew Burns	Harlow Town	8 December 2012	
22 November 2012	Dwight Gayle	Peterborough United	2 January 2013	
16 December 2012	Andrew Burns	Bishop's Stortford	12 January 2013	
18 December 2012	Cain Davies	Waltham Forest	18 January 2013	
24 December 2012	Jack Connors	Hendon	18 April 2013	
8 January 2013	Dominic Green	Dartford	9 February 2013	
23 January 2013	Ian Gayle	Kingstonian	30 June 2013	
29 January 2013	Alex Osborn	Billericay Town	2 March 2013	
31 January 2013	Josh Scott	Ebbsfleet United	2 March 2013	
19 February 2013	Andrew Burns	Leatherhead	16 March 2013	
19 February 2013	Duran Reynolds	Metropolitan Police	27 April 2013	
11 March 2013	Ricardo Santos	Billericay Town	30 June 2013	
12 March 2013	Brian Woodall	Bishop's Stortford	27 April 2013	
19 March 2013	Andrew Burns	Margate	24 April 2013	
19 March 2013	Tom Davie	Margate	24 April 2013	
