= Gianluca Gracco =

Italian footballer

Personal information
- Full name: Gianluca Gracco
- Date of birth: 19 June 1990 (age 36)
- Place of birth: Naples, Italy
- Position: Forward

Senior career*
Years	Team	Apps	(Gls)
2009	Pomezia Calcio		
2009–2010	Cecchina		
2011	US Puteolana		
2011–2012	Città di Pompei		
2012–2013	Dagenham & Redbridge	1	(0)
2014–2015	Internapoli		
2015–	Virtus Volla		
- * Club domestic league appearances and goals as of 20:17, 18 July 2016 (UTC)

Gianluca Gracco (born 19 June 1990) is an Italian footballer who plays as a forward who currently plays for Virtus Volla.

== Career ==
Gracco previously played for Italian amateur side A.S.D. Città di Pompei until the summer of 2012, as the team disbanded as they couldn't secure a playing pitch for the current season. On 26 December 2012, he signed non-contract terms with Football League Two side Dagenham & Redbridge, after impressing on trial. On 31 January 2013, he signed a permanent 18-month contract with the club. He made his professional debut with the Daggers on 1 April 2013, in a 4–2 home league defeat to Bristol Rovers, replacing Gavin Hoyte as a late substitute. On 11 September 2013, Gracco had his contract terminated by mutual consent as he felt his opportunities with the club were limited.

== Career statistics ==
As of match played 18 April 2013.

Appearances and goals by club, season and competition
Club	Season	League			FA Cup		League Cup		Other		Total	
Club	Season	Division	Apps	Goals	Apps	Goals	Apps	Goals	Apps	Goals	Apps	Goals
Dagenham & Redbridge	2012–13	League Two	1	0	—		—		—		1	0
Dagenham & Redbridge	2013–14	League Two	0	0	—		0	0	0	0	0	0
Career totals			1	0	—		0	0	0	0	1	0
