= Luke Howell =

English footballer (born 1987)

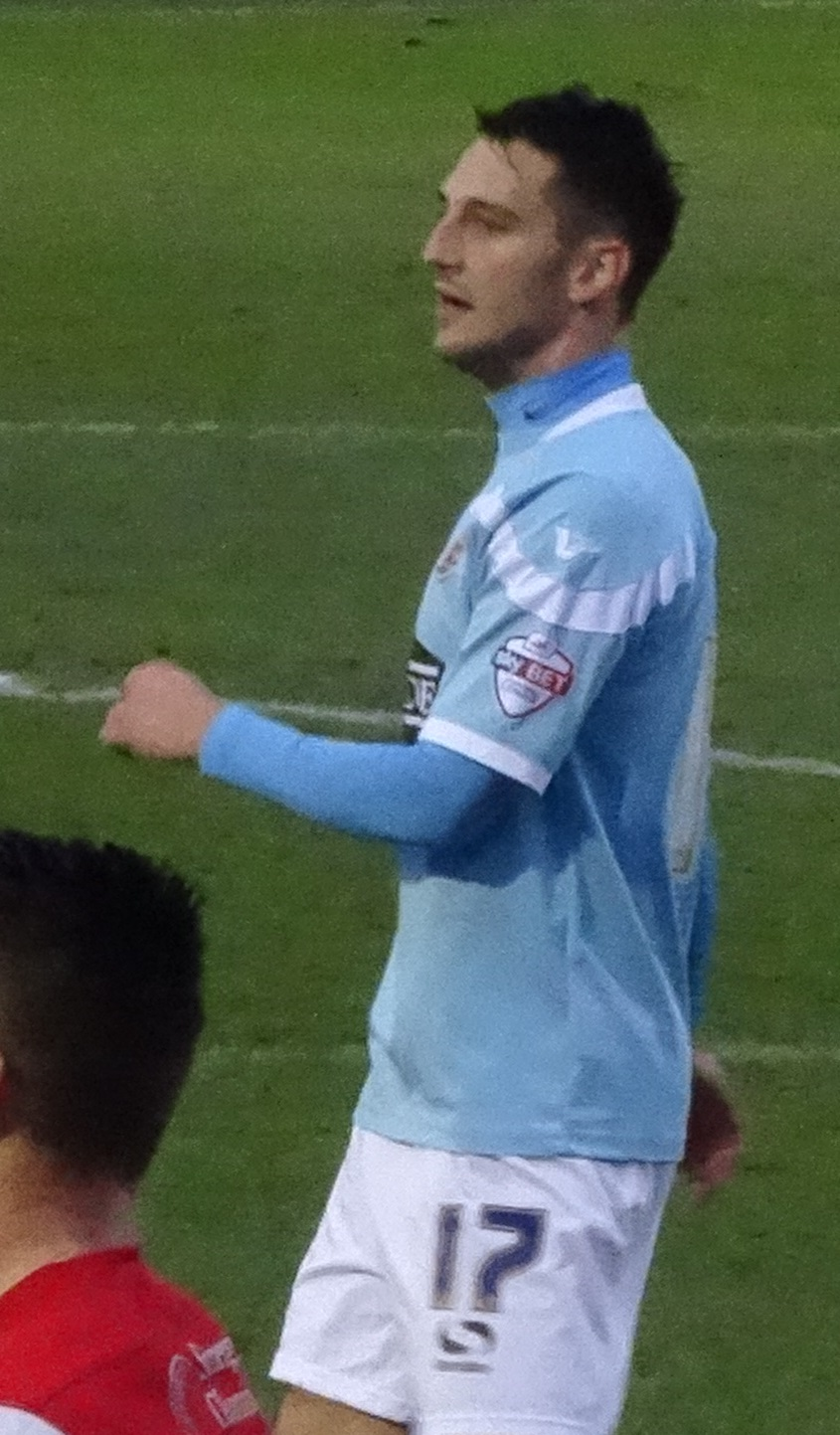
- Howell playing for Dagenham & Redbridge in 2014

Personal information
- Full name: Luke Alexander Howell
- Date of birth: 5 January 1987 (age 39)
- Place of birth: Heathfield, England
- Height: 5 ft 10 in (1.78 m)
- Positions: Midfielder; defender

Team information
- Current team: St Ives Town

Youth career
- 2003–2005: Gillingham

Senior career*
Years	Team	Apps	(Gls)
2005–2007	Gillingham	1	(0)
2005–2006	→ Welling United (loan)	7	(0)
2006–2007	→ Folkestone Invicta (loan)	12	(3)
2007–2011	Milton Keynes Dons	53	(1)
2010–2011	→ Lincoln City (loan)	8	(0)
2011	Lincoln City	17	(1)
2011–2015	Dagenham & Redbridge	127	(18)
2015–2016	Boreham Wood	37	(6)
2016–2018	Dagenham & Redbridge	49	(4)
2018–2019	Aldershot Town	33	(1)
2019–2020	Hemel Hempstead Town	21	(0)
2020–	St Ives Town	3	(0)
- * Club domestic league appearances and goals as of 20:00, 16 November 2020 (UTC)

Luke Alexander Howell (born 5 January 1987) is an English footballer who plays for Northern Premier League Division One Midlands side St Ives Town as a midfielder.

== Career ==
=== Gillingham ===
Educated at Tunbridge Wells Grammar School for Boys, he signed a two-year scholarship deal with Gillingham commencing from the 2003–04 season. On 3 August 2004 he missed out on a substitute appearance in a friendly against Thamesmead Town after being stung by a wasp as he retrieved the ball from a tree. In May 2005 his scholarship was extended into a third year and on 22 November 2005 he joined Welling United on a one-month loan deal.

In May 2006 he signed his first professional contract, agreeing to a one-year deal with the club. He made his debut as a second-half substitute for Ian Cox in the 1–0 home defeat to Nottingham Forest on 14 October 2006 and got his first start in the Football League Trophy first leg home defeat to Nottingham Forest. It was announced on 3 November 2006 that he had joined Folkestone Invicta on a month's loan. He was released by Gillingham in May 2007.

=== Milton Keynes Dons ===
After being released by Gillingham, He signed for the Milton Keynes Dons on a one-year deal, just two days after the opening day of the 2007–08 season. Two days after signing for the club, Howell made his debut for the club, in a League Cup match, as MK Dons drew 3–3 and won on penalties against Ipswich Town. Two months since signing for the club, Howell made his league debut for the club, in a 2–1 win over Mansfield Town. After the match, Howell told Milton Keynes Citizen that his side prove the opposition team wrong Despite eleven appearances in the season, which the club was promoted to League One, Howell signed one-year contract extensions with MK Dons.

The next season, Howell starts his season as he suffered a knocks and continued to be in and out of the first team through injury and just made 18 appearances, mainly in the second half of the season. He scored his first goal for MK Dons against Hereford United in the 1–0 victory on the final game of the season. He also played twice in the 2009 League One Playoff semi-finals against Scunthorpe United, where he was taken off in the second leg with concussion and was replaced by Alan Navarro in the 17th minute. In the end of the second leg League One Playoff semi-finals, MK Dons would lose 7–6 on penalties after playing 120 minutes and Scunthorpe United went on to win the play-offs, promoted to the Championship. At the end of the season, Howell, once again, signed a new contract with the club.

Howells playing time increased under Paul Ince and then Karl Robinson in the 2009–10 season, where he made 35 appearances.

=== Lincoln City ===
Having stayed for the club about two months until on 26 October 2010, he took part in an open training session, while under the supervision of Steve Tilson and Paul Brush at Lincoln City. He is subsequently signed on a one-month loan with the Imps after failing to break into the MK Dons first team. He made his debut, in a 2–2 draw against Wycombe Wanderers. In a match against Morecambe, he suffered a horror tackle from Scott Brown, which he lucky to escape from having a serious injury, which ended his loan spell at Lincoln City. Instead, he was out for four weeks A week later, Howell extended his loan spell until the New Year.

Having made eight appearances, and on 28 January 2011, he had his contract with MK Dons terminated by mutual consent and joined Lincoln until the end of the season. The next day, Howell's first game after signing for the club on a permanent basis, played when he provided assist for Ashley Grimes, in a 1–0 win over Port Vale. Several weeks later, Howell scored his first goal in a 4–2 loss against Barnet However, a week scoring his first goal, he suffered a hamstring injury, ruling him out for four weeks during a match against Port Vale when he fell awkwardly. Manager Tilson says he doesn't fear Howell's injury as serious. Upon recovering from injury, Howell says the team feared relegation.

In May 2011 he was one of just three squad players to be offered a new contract after a mass clear out of players following relegation from the Football League. During his negotiations, he desire refused to rule out to stay at Lincoln City, despite interest from clubs in League One and Two.

=== Dagenham & Redbridge ===
On 1 August 2011, Howell signed a deal with Dagenham & Redbridge. Howell previously went on trial with Dagenham & Redbridge, insisting he enjoyed his time in the pre-season friendly. He made his debut, on the opening game of the season, in a 1–0 win over Macclesfield Town. Having played six games, Howell soon suffered a knee injury against Hereford United, which kept him out for a long time. In March 2012, Howell made his return from injury in a 1–0 loss against Northampton Town and revealed his spend 12 weeks in leg brace. During his time spent on the sidelines, the club started a losing, which placed the club into the relegation zone.

The next season, his season changed, having improved dramatically, when he scored nine goals, including a brace against Rotherham United. In January 2013, Howell signed a new contract with the club, which will keep him until 2015.

=== Boreham Wood ===
After leaving Dagenham & Redbridge it was confirmed by ex-manager Wayne Burnett that Howell had started training with League Two rivals Leyton Orient. The trial spell ended with one pre-season appearance for the O's against Braintree Town in early July.

On 15 July, Howell was announced as a Boreham Wood player. He is part of a trio of signings announced by the club including highly rated former Chelsea youngster Billy Clifford and vastly experienced Football League striker Charlie Macdonald.

=== Return to Dagenham ===
In May 2016, he re-signed for Dagenham & Redbridge after their relegation to the National League along with Scott Doe on a free transfer, re-uniting with former manager John Still. On 25 May 2018 it was announced that he would leave the club at the end of the season due to the expiration of his contract.

=== Aldershot Town ===
On 2 July 2018, Howell agreed to join fellow National League side Aldershot Town, following his release from Dagenham.

=== Hemel Hempstead Town ===
Howell agreed to signed for National League South side Hemel Hempstead Town F.C. on 12 June 2019.

=== St Ives Town ===
Howell signed for Southern League Premier Division Central side St Ives Town on 15 October 2020.

== Career statistics ==
As of match played 16 November 2020

Appearances and goals by club, season and competition
Club	Season	League			FA Cup		League Cup		Other		Total	
Club	Season	Division	Apps	Goals	Apps	Goals	Apps	Goals	Apps	Goals	Apps	Goals
Gillingham	2005–06	League One	0	0	0	0	0	0	0	0	0	0
Gillingham	2006–07	League One	1	0	0	0	0	0	1 (Note: Appearances in Football League Trophy)	0	2	0
Gillingham	Total		1	0	0	0	0	0	1	0	2	0
Welling United (loan)	2005–06	Conference South	7	0	—		—		—		7	0
Folkestone Invicta (loan)	2006–07	IL Premier Division	12	3	—		—		—		12	3
Milton Keynes Dons	2007–08	League Two	8	0	0	0	1	0	2	0	11	0
Milton Keynes Dons	2008–09	League One	15	1	0	0	1	0	2 (Note: Appearances in Football League One play-offs)	0	18	1
Milton Keynes Dons	2009–10	League One	29	0	2	0	1	0	3	0	35	0
Milton Keynes Dons	2010–11	League One	1	0	—		1	0	1	0	3	0
Milton Keynes Dons	Total		53	1	2	0	4	0	8	0	67	1
Lincoln City	2010–11	League Two	25	1	2	0	—		—		27	1
Dagenham & Redbridge	2011–12	League Two	10	0	—		1	0	0	0	11	0
Dagenham & Redbridge	2012–13	League Two	46	9	1	0	1	0	2	0	50	9
Dagenham & Redbridge	2013–14	League Two	40	4	1	0	1	0	1	0	43	4
Dagenham & Redbridge	2014–15	League Two	31	5	2	0	1	0	0	0	34	5
Dagenham & Redbridge	Total		127	18	4	0	4	0	3	0	138	18
Boreham Wood	2015–16	National League	37	6	0	0	—		1 (Note: Appearance in FA Trophy)	0	38	6
Dagenham & Redbridge	2016–17	National League	18	1	1	0	—		2 (Note: Appearances in National League play-offs)	0	21	1
Dagenham & Redbridge	2017–18	National League	31	3	1	0	—		1	0	33	3
Dagenham & Redbridge	Total		49	4	2	0	—		3	0	54	4
Aldershot Town	2018–19	National League	33	1	3	1	—		0	0	36	2
Career totals			344	34	13	1	8	0	16	0	381	35
