= 2010–11 Dagenham & Redbridge F.C. season =

Dagenham & Redbridge
2010–11 season
- Chairman: David Andrews
- Manager: John Still
- Stadium: Victoria Road
- Football League One: 21st
- FA Cup: First round
- Football League Cup: First round
- Football League Trophy: First round
- Top goalscorer: League: Romain Vincelot (12); All: Danny Green (13)
- Highest home attendance: 4,446 (v Milton Keynes Dons, League One, 22 January 2011)
- Lowest home attendance: 1,948 (v Rochdale, League One, 8 January 2011)
- Average home league attendance: 2,770

The 2010–11 season is the 4th season in the Football League played by Dagenham & Redbridge F.C., an English football club based in Dagenham, Greater London. It is their first ever season in Football League One after promotion from Football League Two in 2010 via the play-offs. The season covers the period from 1 July 2010 to 30 June 2011.

== Match results ==
League positions are sourced from Statto, while the remaining contents of each table are sourced from the references in the "Ref" column.

=== League table ===
Pos	Team	Pld	W	D	L	GF	GA	GD	Pts	Promotion, qualification or relegation
19	Notts County	46	14	8	24	46	60	−14	50	
20	Walsall	46	12	12	22	56	75	−19	48	
21	Dagenham & Redbridge (R)	46	12	11	23	52	70	−18	47	Relegation to Football League Two
22	Bristol Rovers (R)	46	11	12	23	48	82	−34	45	Relegation to Football League Two
23	Plymouth Argyle (R)	46	15	7	24	51	74	−23	42 (Note: Plymouth Argyle deducted 10 points for insolvency.)	Relegation to Football League Two

Updated to match(es) played on 2 May 2011. Source: BBC
Rules for classification: 1) points; 2) goal difference; 3) number of goals scored.
(R) Relegated

=== League One ===
Date	League position	Opponents	Venue	Result	Score F–A	Scorers	Attendance	Ref
7 August 2010	21st	Sheffield Wednesday	A	L	0–2		23,081	
21 August 2010	24th	Notts County	A	L	0–1		5,210	
28 August 2010	23rd	Tranmere Rovers	H	D	2–2	Vincelot 52', Arber 71'	2,256	
4 September 2010	19th	Leyton Orient	H	W	2–0	Vincelot (2) 8', 50'	4,195	
11 September 2010	24th	Bournemouth	A	L	0–3		5,501	
18 September 2010	24th	Bristol Rovers	H	L	0–3		2,287	
21 September 2010	23rd	Exeter City	H	D	1–1	Vincelot 71'	2,005	
25 September 2010	23rd	Charlton Athletic	A	D	2–2	Green 45' pen., Nurse 90'	14,806	
28 September 2010	23rd	Colchester United	A	D	2–2	Savage 15', Vincelot 72'	4,515	
2 October 2010	20th	Swindon Town	H	W	2–1	Scannell 48', Savage 80'	2,767	
9 October 2010	21st	Milton Keynes Dons	A	L	0–2		7,083	
16 October 2010	23rd	Walsall	H	D	1–1	Currie 26'	2,666	
23 October 2010	24th	Rochdale	A	L	2–3	Scannell 64', Arber 68'	2,650	
30 October 2010	23rd	Hartlepool United	H	D	1–1	Hartley 49' o.g.	2,464	
2 November 2010	23rd	Southampton	A	L	0–4		20,161	
13 November 2010	22nd	Yeovil Town	A	W	3–1	Antwi 18', Ogogo 81', Elito 86'	3,586	
20 November 2010	22nd	Oldham Athletic	H	L	0–1		2,239	
23 November 2010	22nd	Plymouth Argyle	A	L	1–2	Tomlin 9'	4,960	
11 December 2010	22nd	Carlisle United	A	W	2–0	Elito 82', Green 89'	4,380	
1 January 2011	22nd	Brentford	A	L	1–2	Vincelot 34'	5,405	
3 January 2011	23rd	Southampton	H	L	1–3	Scott 84'	3,585	
8 January 2011	23rd	Rochdale	H	L	0–1		1,948	
15 January 2011	23rd	Hartlepool United	A	W	1–0	Tomlin 86'	2,939	
22 January 2011	23rd	Milton Keynes Dons	H	L	0–1		4,446	
1 February 2011	23rd	Brentford	H	W	4–1	Nurse (2) 19', 66', Osborne 56' o.g., Vincelot 67'	1,907	
5 February 2011	24th	Oldham Athletic	A	D	1–1	Vincelot 73'	4,121	
12 February 2011	22nd	Yeovil Town	H	W	2–1	Vincelot 30', Nurse 72'	2,119	
15 February 2011	23rd	Walsall	A	L	0–1		3,174	
22 February 2011	23rd	Huddersfield Town	H	D	1–1	Green 59' pen.	2,336	
26 February 2011	23rd	Bournemouth	H	L	1–2	Nurse 48'	2,768	
5 March 2011	21st	Bristol Rovers	A	W	2–0	Green 45', Vincelot 83'	5,716	
8 March 2011	20th	Colchester United	H	W	1–0	Savage 12'	2,140	
12 March 2011	20th	Swindon Town	A	D	1–1	Nurse 83'	7,864	
19 March 2011	20th	Charlton Athletic	H	W	2–1	Nurse 33', Green 55'	3,505	
22 March 2011	20th	Leyton Orient	A	D	1–1	Green 12'	4,581	
26 March 2011	20th	Sheffield Wednesday	H	D	1–1	Green 80' pen.	3,549	
29 March 2011	20th	Brighton & Hove Albion	H	L	0–1		3,604	
2 April 2011	20th	Exeter City	A	L	1–2	Vincelot 76'	4,598	
5 April 2011	21st	Peterborough United	H	L	0–2		2,063	
9 April 2011	19th	Notts County	H	W	3–1	Akinde 16', Green (2) 41', 45+6' pen.	2,608	
12 April 2011	19th	Brighton & Hove Albion	A	L	3–4	Akinde 1', Nurse 48', Green 51' pen.	7,619	
16 April 2011	19th	Tranmere Rovers	A	L	0–2		4,562	
22 April 2011	20th	Plymouth Argyle	H	L	0–1		3,559	
25 April 2011	21st	Huddersfield Town	A	L	1–2	Vincelot 28'	14,072	
30 April 2011	21st	Carlisle United	H	W	3–0	Nurse (2) 4', 29', Green 84'	2,693	
7 May 2011	21st	Peterborough United	A	L	0–5		7,519	

=== FA Cup ===
Round	Date	Opponents	Venue	Result	Score F–A	Scorers	Attendance	Ref
First round	6 November 2010	Leyton Orient	H	D	1–1	Green 45'	3,378	
First round replay	16 November 2010	Leyton Orient	A	L	2–3	Green 67' pen., Taiwo 68'	2,901	

=== League Cup ===
Round	Date	Opponents	Venue	Result	Score F–A	Scorers	Attendance	Ref
First round	10 August 2010	Milton Keynes Dons	A	L	1–2	McCrory 13'	3,502	

=== Football League Trophy ===
Round	Date	Opponents	Venue	Result	Score F–A	Scorers	Attendance	Ref
First round	31 August 2010	Charlton Athletic	A	L	0–1		4,630	

== Player details ==
As of 26 October 2012.

Numbers in parentheses denote appearances as substitute.
Players with names struck through and marked † left the club during the playing season.
Players with names in italics and marked * were on loan from another club for the whole of their season with Dagenham & Redbridge.
Players listed with no appearances have been in the matchday squad but only as unused substitutes.
Key to positions: GK – Goalkeeper; DF – Defender; MF – Midfielder; FW – Forward

No.	Pos.	Nat.	Name	League		FA Cup		League Cup		FL Trophy		Total		Discipline	
No.	Pos.	Nat.	Name	Apps	Goals	Apps	Goals	Apps	Goals	Apps	Goals	Apps	Goals	A yellow rectangle, denoting the yellow penalty card shown to a player being cautioned	A red rectangle, denoting the red penalty card shown to a player being sent off
1	GK	WAL	Tony Roberts	43	0	0	0	1	0	0	0	44	0	2	0
2	DF	ENG	Luke Wilkinson	0	0	0	0	0	0	0	0	0	0	0	0
3	DF	IRL	Damien McCrory	22 (1)	0	2	0	1	1	0	0	25 (1)	1	1	0
4	DF	ENG	Scott Doe	38	0	0	0	1	0	0	0	39	0	2	0
5	DF	GHA	Will Antwi	9 (2)	1	2	0	0	0	1	0	12 (2)	1	3	0
6	DF	ENG	Mark Arber	44	2	2	0	1	0	1	0	48	2	2	0
7	MF	ENG	Danny Green	40 (2)	11	2	2	0	0	1	0	45	13	11	2
8	MF	ENG	~~Stuart Thurgood~~ †	0	0	0	0	0	0	0	0	0	0	0	0
8	MF	WAL	~~Kayleden Brown *~~ †	3	0	0	0	0	0	0	0	3	0	1	0
8	FW	ENG	John Akinde *	8 (1)	2	0	0	0	0	0	0	8 (1)	2	0	0
9	FW	BRB	Jon Nurse	24 (14)	10	2	0	1	0	1	0	28 (14)	10	4	0
10	FW	ENG	Josh Scott	8 (8)	1	0	0	1	0	1	0	10 (8)	1	0	0
11	FW	ENG	Gavin Tomlin	16 (3)	2	0 (1)	0	0	0	0	0	16 (4)	2	0	0
12	DF	ENG	Philip Ifil	13 (1)	0	0	0	0	0	0	0	13 (1)	0	3	0
14	FW	ENG	~~Paul Benson~~ †	3	0	0	0	1	0	0	0	4	0	1	0
14	MF	ISL	~~Victor Pálsson *~~ †	2	0	1	0	0	0	0	0	3	0	0	0
15	MF	ENG	Damian Scannell	14 (6)	2	0 (1)	0	0 (1)	0	1	0	15 (8)	2	0	0
16	FW	ENG	Bas Savage	21 (15)	3	2	0	0	0	0	0	23 (15)	3	1	0
17	MF	ENG	Darren Currie	12 (10)	1	0 (1)	0	1	0	0 (1)	0	13 (12)	1	0	0
18	MF	ENG	~~Stephen Demetriou~~ †	0	0	0	0	0	0	0	0	0	0	0	0
18	MF	NGA	Solomon Taiwo *	16 (2)	0	2	1	0	0	1	18 (2)	1	1	0	
19	DF	ENG	Abu Ogogo	33	1	2	0	1	0	1	0	37	1	6	0
20	MF	FRA	Romain Vincelot	46	12	2	0	1	0	1	0	50	12	5	0
21	MF	ENG	Danny Green	0	0	0	0	0	0	0	0	0	0	0	0
22	MF	ENG	Graeme Montgomery	0	0	0	0	0	0	0 (1)	0	0 (1)	0	0	0
23	MF	ENG	~~Stuart Lewis~~ †	7 (3)	0	0	1	0	0	0	0	8 (3)	0	0	0
24	MF	ENG	Billy Bingham	4 (2)	0	0	0	0	0	0	0	4 (2)	0	0	0
25	DF	ENG	Gareth Gwillim	0 (2)	0	0	0	0	0	1	0	1 (2)	0	0	0
26	MF	ENG	Tommy Tejan-Sie	0	0	0	0	0	0	0	0	0	0	0	0
27	GK	ENG	Dave Hogan	0	0	0	0	0	0	0	0	0	0	0	0
28	MF	ENG	Lee Wootton	0	0	0	0	0	0	0	0	0	0	0	0
29	DF	ENG	Femi Ilesanmi	24 (1)	0	0	0	0	0	0	0	24 (1)	0	4	1
30	GK	ENG	Chris Lewington	3	0	2	0	0	0	1	0	6	0	0	0
31	FW	ENG	Phil Walsh	0 (3)	0	0	0	0 (1)	0	0	0	0 (4)	0	0	0
32	DF	ENG	Duran Reynolds	0	0	0	0	0	0	0	0	0	0	0	0
33	MF	IRL	Peter Gain	35 (2)	0	1	0	0 (1)	0	1	0	37 (3)	0	8	1
34	FW	ENG	Alex Osborn	0	0	0	0	0	0	0	0	0	0	0	0
35	FW	ENG	~~Nathaniel Pinney *~~ †	0 (1)	0	0	0	0	0	0	0	0 (1)	0	0	0
35	MF	ENG	Olly Lee *	4 (1)	0	0	0	0	0	0	0	4 (1)	0	0	0
36	MF	NGA	Conor Okus	0	0	0	0	0	0	0	0	0	0	0	0
37	MF	ENG	~~Medy Elito *~~ †	8 (2)	0	0	0	0	0	0	0	8 (2)	0	1	0
37	FW	ENG	Cameron Lancaster *	0 (4)	0	0	0	0	0	0	0	0 (4)	0	1	0
38	DF	ENG	~~Eddie Oshodi *~~ †	0	0	0	0	0	0	0	0	0	0	1	0
38	FW	ENG	Jon-Jo Bates	0	0	0	0	0	0	0	0	0	0	0	0
39	GK	ENG	~~Simon Locke *~~ †	0	0	0	0	0	0	0	0	0	0	0	0
39	FW	ENG	Marvin Morgan *	5 (7)	0	0	0	0	0	0	0	5 (7)	0	0	0

== Transfers ==
=== In ===
Date	Name	From	Fee	Ref
1 July 2010	Gavin Tomlin	Yeovil Town	Free	
1 July 2010	Danny Green	Billericay Town	Free	
1 July 2010	Damian Scannell	Southend United	Free	
1 July 2010	Gareth Gwillim	Histon	Free	
1 July 2010	Stuart Lewis	Gillingham	Free	
6 July 2010	Luke Wilkinson	Portsmouth	Free	
22 July 2010	Alex Osborn	Grays Athletic	Undisclosed	
22 July 2010	Femi Ilesanmi	Ashford Town	Free	
22 July 2010	Duran Reynolds	Grays Athletic	Free	
22 August 2010	Conor Okus	West Ham United	Free	
14 September 2010	Philip Ifil	Colchester United	Free	
17 September 2010	Bas Savage	Tranmere Rovers	Free	
14 February 2011	Jon-Jo Bates	Bedfont Town	Free	

=== Out ===
Date	Name	To	Fee	Ref
1 July 2010	Wes Thomas	Cheltenham Town	Free	
27 August 2010	Harlee Dean	Southampton	Undisclosed	
30 August 2010	Paul Benson	Charlton Athletic	Undisclosed	
20 September 2010	Stuart Thurgood		Retired	
24 January 2011	Stuart Lewis	Wycombe Wanderers	Free	
30 June 2011	Graeme Montgomery		Released	
30 June 2011	Bas Savage		Released	
30 June 2011	Philip Ifil		Released	
30 June 2011	Tommy Tejan-Sie		Released	
30 June 2011	Will Antwi		Released	
30 June 2011	Darren Currie		Released	
30 June 2011	Gareth Gwillim		Released	
