= Brian Woodall (footballer, born 1987) =

English footballer (born 1987)

Personal information
- Full name: Brian Woodall
- Date of birth: 28 December 1987 (age 38)
- Place of birth: Bielefeld, Germany
- Height: 1.87 m (6 ft 1 1/2 in)
- Position: Striker

Senior career*
Years	Team	Apps	(Gls)
2006–2007	SC Herford		
2007–2008	Hinckley United	12	(0)
2008–2009	Gresley Rovers		
2009	Atherstone Town		
2009	→ Gresley Rovers (loan)		
2009	Coventry Sphinx		
2009–2011	Gresley	69	(37)
2011–2014	Dagenham & Redbridge	75	(13)
2013	→ Bishop's Stortford (loan)	11	(6)
2013	→ Dover Athletic (loan)	1	(0)
2014	Bishop's Stortford	24	(4)
2015	Stirling Lions	11	(1)
2015–2019	Inglewood United		
2019	Bayswater City		
2019	Inglewood United		
- * Club domestic league appearances and goals as of 15:18, 7 May 2014 (UTC)

Brian Woodall (born 28 December 1987) is an English footballer who plays as a striker.

== Career ==
Woodall began his career with German club SC Herford, before returning to England and playing for Hinckley United. In February 2008, he moved to Gresley Rovers. Woodall moved to Atherstone Town in February 2009, but returned to Gresley in March on loan. Following an unsuccessful trial with Nuneaton Town, he moved to Coventry Sphinx, playing just a few games before rejoining Gresley. He finished the 2009–10 season as the club's top goalscorer with 30 goals and in 2010–11 was named the club's Player of the Year.

He moved to Dagenham & Redbridge in July 2011, and made his professional debut on 9 August, coming on as a substitute in their 5–0 away loss to Bournemouth in the Football League Cup Second Round.

In November 2013, Woodall joined Conference South side Dover Athletic on a two-month loan deal.

On 2 January 2014, Woodall left Dagenham & Redbridge by mutual consent.

On 3 January 2014, Woodall joined Conference South side Bishop's Stortford, where he had scored six goals in 11 appearances on loan the previous season. He scored the winning goal on his first game as Stortford won 3–2 at Dover Athletic.

== Career statistics ==
As of match played 16 July 2016

Appearances and goals by club, season and competition
Club	Season	League			FA Cup		League Cup		Other		Total	
Club	Season	Division	Apps	Goals	Apps	Goals	Apps	Goals	Apps	Goals	Apps	Goals
Hinckley United	2006–07	Conference North	4	0	1	0	—		0	0	5	0
Hinckley United	2007–08	Conference North	8	0	2	0	—		0	0	10	0
Hinckley United	Total		12	0	3	0	—		0	0	15	0
Gresley	2009–10	East Midlands Counties	33	20	2	2	—		11 (Note: Six appearances, four goals in FA Vase; three appearances, four goals in East Midlands Counties League Cup; two appearances in Derbyshire Senior Cup)	7	46	29
Gresley	2010–11	East Midlands Counties	36	17	2	3	—		5 (Note: Three appearances in FA Vase; one appearance, one goal in East Midlands Counties League Cup; one appearance in Derbyshire Senior Cup)	1	43	21
Gresley	Total		69	37	4	5	—		16	8	89	50
Dagenham & Redbridge	2011–12	League Two	39	11	5	2	1	0	1 (Note: Appearances in Football League Trophy)	0	46	13
Dagenham & Redbridge	2012–13	League Two	28	1	1	0	1	0	2	1	32	2
Dagenham & Redbridge	2013–14	League Two	8	1	0	0	1	0	1	0	10	1
Dagenham & Redbridge	Total		75	13	6	2	3	0	4	1	88	16
Bishop's Stortford (loan)	2012–13	Conference North	11	6	—		—		—		11	6
Dover Athletic (loan)	2013–14	Conference South	1	0	—		—		2 (Note: Appearance(s) in FA Trophy)	0	3	0
Bishop's Stortford	2013–14	Conference South	24	4	—		—		5 (Note: Three appearances in Herts Senior Cup; two appearances, one goal in Herts Charity Cup)	1	29	5
Stirling Lions	2015	NPL Western Australia	11	1	—		—		—		11	1
Inglewood United	2015	NPL Western Australia	8	0	—		—		—		8	0
Inglewood United	2016	NPL Western Australia	13	7	—		—		—		13	7
Inglewood United	Total		21	7	—		—		—		21	7
Career total			224	68	13	7	3	0	27	10	267	85
