= Medy Elito =

Footballer (born 1990)

Personal information
- Full name: Medy Ekofo Elito
- Date of birth: 20 March 1990 (age 36)
- Place of birth: Kinshasa, Zaire (now DR Congo)
- Height: 6 ft 0 in (1.83 m)
- Positions: Central midfielder; winger

Team information
- Current team: Sheppey United

Youth career
- –2007: Colchester United

Senior career*
Years	Team	Apps	(Gls)
2007–2011	Colchester United	19	(1)
2010	→ Cheltenham Town (loan)	12	(3)
2010–2011	→ Dagenham & Redbridge (loan)	10	(2)
2011	→ Cheltenham Town (loan)	2	(0)
2011–2014	Dagenham & Redbridge	115	(17)
2014–2015	VVV-Venlo	28	(0)
2015–2016	Newport County	38	(1)
2016–2018	Cambridge United	55	(9)
2018–2020	Barnet	40	(2)
2021–2022	Wealdstone	25	(1)
2022–2023	Welling United	29	(0)
2023–2024	Ramsgate	29	(4)
2024	Hythe Town	0	(0)
2024	Ramsgate	4	(0)
2024–2025	Hythe Town	20	(0)
2025–	Sheppey United	28	(0)

International career
2006–2007	England U17	2	(0)
2008	England U18	1	(0)
2008	England U19	3	(0)
- * Club domestic league appearances and goals as of 09:50, 4 July 2026 (UTC)

Medy Ekofo Elito (born 20 March 1990) is a professional footballer who plays as a midfielder for Sheppey United. Born in Zaire (now DR Congo), he represented England internationally at youth levels U17 through U19. Elito is also a rapper who performs under the name Don EE.

== Club career ==
As a teenager, Elito played in the Colchester United Academy. He signed a professional contract with the U's in May 2007, having already played for the U's at youth and reserve team level. He was given the number 30 shirt for the 2007–08 season and made his Colchester debut as a substitute in a 4–1 defeat away at Plymouth Argyle on 4 March 2008. On 29 March 2008, he scored his first professional goal, against West Bromwich Albion in the Championship. At the time it gave Colchester a 2–0 lead, although following a half-time substitution, Elito was helpless as they went on to lose 4–3, and eventually lose their Championship status. On 4 September 2009, he signed a new two-year contract with Colchester United.

Elito signed a monthlong loan at Cheltenham Town on 5 March 2010, and made he debut against Chesterfield a day later. After increasing that loan to the end of the season, Elito scored goals against Darlington, Port Vale as well as a well-timed strike from the edge of the box against Burton Albion, in the 6–5 win.

In November 2010, Elito joined Dagenham & Redbridge on loan until 3 January 2011. He made his debut for Dagenham and scored on 13 November in a 3–1 away win against Yeovil Town.

On 25 February 2011, Elito signed on loan to Cheltenham until the end of the season.

On 28 April, Colchester announced that he would be one of three players who would be released at the end of the season.

On 28 June 2011, Elito signed for League Two side Dagenham & Redbridge on a two-year deal. On 7 January 2013, Elto signed a two-year contract extension. In the summer of 2014, Elito was released from his contract at Dagenham & Redbridge at his own request and was transferred to Dutch side VVV-Venlo in the Eerste Divisie, the second tier of Dutch football.

On 25 June 2015, Elito signed for League Two club Newport County. He made his debut for Newport on 8 August 2015 versus Cambridge United, missing a penalty in the 72nd minute in a 3–0 defeat. Elito scored his first goal for Newport on 19 April 2016 against Oxford United. He was offered a new contract by Newport at the end of the 2015–16 season but the offer was withdrawn and he was released after he failed to accept the contract by the deadline of 10 June 2016.

Elito signed for Cambridge United on 13 June 2016. He scored his first goal for Cambridge in a 2–1 EFL Cup loss against Wolverhampton Wanderers on 23 August 2016. He was released at the end of the 2018 season. Elito joined Barnet on a two-year deal on 27 July 2018. He left the club at the end of the 2019–20 season, having scored twice in 55 games.

After a year out of football, Elito signed for Wealdstone in August 2021. On 11 September 2021, he scored his first goal for Wealdstone, a 101st-minute winner from the penalty spot against Altrincham. On 27 July 2022, it was announced that Elito left Wealdstone after his contract was not renewed.

In August 2022, Elito joined National League South side Welling United.

In July 2023, Elito joined Ramsgate, where he remained for a year before moving to fellow Isthmian League South East Division side Hythe Town ahead of the 2024–25 season. Just one week into the season however, having failed to make an appearance, he returned to Ramsgate on 16 August 2024. He departed the club again two months later in search for more playing time, subsequently rejoining Hythe.

On 27 July 2025, Elito signed for Sheppey United.

== International career ==
In the summer of 2007, he was selected to represent England at the FIFA U17 World Cup in Korea, having previously represented them in the Algarve Tournament, a round-robin tournament held in Portugal. He made a substitute appearance in England's 5–0 win against New Zealand, winning praise from the U17's Head Coach, John Peacock, and also made an appearance in the tournament in the quarter final game with Germany. He received further praise, this time from ex-Us player Perry Groves when he was selected for the England U18 side to face Ghana in November 2007 at Gillingham's Priestfield Stadium, a match in which he came on as a half time substitute for Nathan Porritt, the final result being a 2–0 England win.

== Music career ==
Performing as Don EE, Elito first emerged on the music scene in 2011, when he first featured on Mover's Ouchchea Vol.1 mixtape on the song 'Weather's Not Nice'. He also featured on Mover's 2nd mixtape Ouchchea Vol.2, singing the hook of song 'Goodman Move'. However, his first musical breakthrough was when he released his first single, with Pascoli, named "Balenciaga" alongside Kojo Funds, gaining local success. However, Elito is widely known for his single, "You Alright Yeah?", which was released in 2017. The song gained traction after being shared by Beyoncé on Instagram. He has also released tracks featuring Davido and Ms Banks, and performed at Wireless Festival and Wembley Arena.

== Career statistics ==
As of match played 21 March 2026

Appearances and goals by club, season and competition
Club	Season	League			National cup		League cup		Other		Total	
Club	Season	Division	Apps	Goals	Apps	Goals	Apps	Goals	Apps	Goals	Apps	Goals
Colchester United	2007–08	Championship	11	1	0	0	0	0	—		11	1
Colchester United	2008–09	League One	5	0	1	0	1	0	1 (Note: Appearances in Football League Trophy)	0	8	0
Colchester United	2009–10	League One	3	0	1	0	0	0	0	0	4	0
Colchester United	2010–11	League One	0	0	0	0	1	0	0	0	1	0
Colchester United	Total		19	1	2	0	2	0	1	0	24	1
Cheltenham Town (loan)	2009–10	League Two	12	3	—		—		—		12	3
Dagenham & Redbridge (loan)	2010–11	League One	10	2	—		—		—		10	2
Cheltenham Town (loan)	2010–11	League Two	2	0	—		—		—		2	0
Dagenham & Redbridge	2011–12	League Two	24	4	2	0	1	0	0	0	27	4
Dagenham & Redbridge	2012–13	League Two	46	6	1	0	1	0	1	0	49	6
Dagenham & Redbridge	2013–14	League Two	45	7	1	0	1	0	3	1	50	8
Dagenham & Redbridge	Total		115	17	4	0	3	0	4	1	126	18
VVV-Venlo	2014–15	Eerste Divisie	28	0	3	0	—		0	0	31	0
Newport County	2015–16	League Two	38	1	4	0	1	0	0	0	43	1
Cambridge United	2016–17	League Two	23	5	2	1	2	1	2	0	29	7
Cambridge United	2017–18	League Two	32	4	1	0	1	0	3	0	37	4
Cambridge United	Total		55	9	3	1	3	1	5	0	66	11
Barnet	2018–19	National League	25	2	4	0	—		5 (Note: Appearances in FA Trophy)	0	34	2
Barnet	2019–20	National League	15	0	1	0	—		5 (Note: Four appearances in FA Trophy, one appearance in National League playoffs)	0	21	0
Barnet	Total		40	2	5	0	—		10	0	55	2
Wealdstone	2021–22	National League	25	1	1	0	—		0	0	26	1
Welling United	2022–23	National League South	29	0	1	0	—		1	0	31	0
Ramsgate	2023–24	Isthmian League South East Division	29	4	7	0	—		5 (Note: One appearance in Alan Turvey Trophy, three appearances and four goals in FA Trophy, one appearance in Isthmian League South East play-offs)	4	41	8
Ramsgate	2024–25	Isthmian League South East Division	4	0	4	0	—		4 (Note: Three appearances in FA Trophy, one appearance in Alan Turvey Trophy)	0	12	0
Ramsgate	Total		33	4	11	0	0	0	9	4	53	8
Hythe Town	2024–25	Isthmian League South East Division	20	0	0	0	—		0	0	20	0
Sheppey United	2025–26	Isthmian League South East Division	28	0	3	0	–		4 (Note: Includes Kent Senior Cup and Alan Turvey Trophy)	0	35	0
Career total			454	43	34	1	9	1	34	5	534	47
