= Josh Scott (footballer) =

English footballer

Personal information
- Full name: Joshua Daniel Scott
- Date of birth: 10 May 1985 (age 41)
- Place of birth: Camden, England
- Height: 6 ft 1 in (1.85 m)
- Position: Striker

Youth career
- 2001–2003: Hayes

Senior career*
Years	Team	Apps	(Gls)
2003–2007	Hayes	89	(27)
2007–2009	Hayes & Yeading United	57	(35)
2009–2014	Dagenham & Redbridge	105	(15)
2013	→ Ebbsfleet United (loan)	6	(3)
2014–2015	Aldershot Town	43	(5)
2015–2016	Hayes & Yeading United	12	(3)
Total		312	(88)
- * Club domestic league appearances and goals

Joshua Daniel "Josh" Scott (born 10 May 1985) is an English former professional footballer who played as a striker.

== Career ==
=== Early career ===
Scott started his career with non-League club Hayes in the 2003–04 season, before their merger with Yeading into Hayes & Yeading United. He ended the 2008–09 season as Hayes & Yeading's top goal scorer with 25 goals, helping them to secure promotion into the Conference National.

=== Dagenham and Redbridge ===
He signed for League Two club Dagenham & Redbridge on 1 July 2009, agreeing a three-year contract. Scott made his debut for Dagenham on 11 August in the first round of the League Cup away against Cardiff City, replacing Wesley Thomas as a substitute in the 55th minute. He scored with a close range shot in the 80th minute, as Dagenham lost 3–1. Scott scored four goals as Dagenham beat Morecambe 6–0 in the League Two Play–off semi finals first leg. He is also the only player to score four in one match in a play-off match.

In March 2012, Scott signed a new 2-year contract with the Daggers which will keep him at the club till the summer of 2014. He was loaned out to Blue Square Bet Premier club Ebbsfleet United for an initial month in February 2013.

On 15 January 2014, Scott had his contract cancelled by mutual consent.

== Career statistics ==
As of match played 12 December 2015

Appearances and goals by club, season and competition
Club	Season	League			FA Cup		League Cup		Other		Total	
Club	Season	Division	Apps	Goals	Apps	Goals	Apps	Goals	Apps	Goals	Apps	Goals
Hayes	2003–04	IL Premier Division	28	3	0	0	—		0	0	28	3
Hayes	2004–05	Conference South	26	11	2	1	—		2 (Note: Appearances in FA Trophy)	3	30	15
Hayes	2005–06	Conference South	17	4	0	0	—		1	0	18	4
Hayes	2006–07	Conference South	18	9	0	0	—		0	0	18	9
Hayes	Total		89	27	2	1	—		3	3	94	31
Hayes & Yeading United	2007–08	Conference South	21	13	1	0	—		2	2	24	15
Hayes & Yeading United	2008–09	Conference South	36	22	4	1	—		6 (Note: 2 appearances and 2 goals in Conference League Cup, 1 appearance in Middlesex Senior Cup, 2 appearances in FA Trophy, 1 appearance in Conference South play-offs)	2	46	25
Hayes & Yeading United	Total		57	35	5	1	—		8	4	70	40
Dagenham & Redbridge	2009–10	League Two	40	10	1	0	1	1	4 (Note: 1 appearance and 1 goal in Football League Trophy, 3 appearances and 4 goals in Football League Two play-offs)	5	46	16
Dagenham & Redbridge	2010–11	League One	16	1	0	0	1	0	1 (Note: Appearances in Football League Trophy)	0	18	1
Dagenham & Redbridge	2011–12	League Two	20	1	4	0	0	0	0	0	24	1
Dagenham & Redbridge	2012–13	League Two	18	2	0	0	1	0	1	1	20	3
Dagenham & Redbridge	2013–14	League Two	11	1	0	0	1	1	2	0	14	2
Dagenham & Redbridge	Total		105	15	5	0	4	2	8	6	122	23
Ebbsfleet United (loan)	2012–13	Conference Premier	6	3	—		—		—		6	3
Aldershot Town	2013–14	Conference Premier	20	3	—		—		1	0	21	3
Aldershot Town	2014–15	Conference Premier	23	2	1	2	—		0	0	24	4
Aldershot Town	Total		43	5	1	2	—		1	0	45	7
Hayes & Yeading United	2015–16	National League South	12	3	1	1	—		2	0	15	4
Career total			312	88	14	5	4	2	22	13	352	108

== Honours ==
Dagenham & Redbridge

- Football League Two play-offs: 2010
