= 2007–08 Dagenham & Redbridge F.C. season =

Dagenham & Redbridge
2007–08 season
- Chairman: David Andrews
- Manager: John Still
- Stadium: Victoria Road
- Football League Two: 20th
- FA Cup: Third round
- Football League Cup: First round
- Football League Trophy: Quarter final
- Top goalscorer: League: Ben Strevens (15); All: Ben Strevens (20)
- Highest home attendance: 3,451 v Mansfield Town, League Two, 3 May 2008
- Lowest home attendance: 1,328 v Chester City, League Two, 12 February 2008
- Average home league attendance: 2,007
colours	colours	Third colours

The 2007–08 season was the 1st season in the Football League played by Dagenham & Redbridge F.C., an English football club based in Dagenham, Greater London. It was their first consecutive season in Football League Two after promotion from Football Conference in 2007. The season covers the period from 1 July 2007 to 30 June 2008.

== Match results ==
League positions are sourced from Statto, while the remaining contents of each table are sourced from the references in the "Ref" column.

=== League Two ===
==== League table ====
Pos	Team	Pld	W	D	L	GF	GA	GD	Pts
18	Shrewsbury Town	46	12	14	20	56	65	−9	50
19	Macclesfield Town	46	11	17	18	47	64	−17	50
20	Dagenham & Redbridge	46	13	10	23	49	70	−21	49
21	Notts County	46	10	18	18	37	53	−16	48
22	Chester City	46	12	11	23	51	68	−17	47

Updated to match(es) played on 3 May 2008. Source: The Football League
Rules for classification: 1) points; 2) goal difference; 3) number of goals scored.

==== Matches ====
Date	League position	Opponents	Venue	Result	Score F–A	Scorers	Attendance	Ref
11 August 2007	20th	Stockport County	A	L	0–1		5,577	
18 August 2007	18th	Wycombe Wanderers	H	D	2–2	Sloma, Moore	2,280	
25 August 2007	24th	Chester City	A	L	0–4		2,098	
1 September 2007	21st	Lincoln City	H	W	1–0	Benson	2,060	
8 September 2007	17th	Barnet	H	D	1–1	Thomas	2,192	
15 September 2007	20th	Notts County	A	L	0–1		3,926	
22 September 2007	21st	Bury	H	D	1–1	Rainford	1,597	
29 September 2007	18th	Mansfield Town	A	W	1–0	Huke	2,048	
2 October 2007	13th	Brentford	A	W	3–2	Strevens, Rainford (pen), Moore	3,662	
6 October 2007	15th	Darlington	H	L	0–3		1,888	
14 October 2007	18th	Accrington Stanley	H	L	1–3	Cavanagh (og)	1,596	
20 October 2007	18th	Chesterfield	A	D	1–1	Benson	4,101	
27 October 2007	19th	Rotherham United	H	L	0–2		2,091	
3 November 2007	19th	Rochdale	A	L	0–1		2,278	
6 November 2007	20th	Peterborough United	A	L	1–3		4,200	
17 November 2007	20th	Bradford City	H	L	1–4	Moore	2,247	
24 November 2007	21st	Macclesfield Town	A	D	1–1	Southam (pen)	1,781	
4 December 2007	23rd	Milton Keynes Dons	A	L	0–1		1,880	
8 December 2007	21st	Wrexham	H	W	3–0	Evans (og), Strevens, Taylor	1,520	
15 December 2007	22nd	Shrewsbury Town	A	L	0–4		4,597	
22 December 2007	22nd	Notts County	H	D	1–1	Southam (pen)	1,649	
26 December 2007	22nd	Barnet	A	L	1–3	Huke	2,513	
29 December 2007	21st	Bury	A	W	2–0	Strevens (2)	1,887	
1 January 2008	21st	Brentford	H	L	1–2	Strevens	2,353	
12 January 2009	22nd	Morecambe	A	L	1–2	Strevens	2,754	
19 January 2008	22nd	Grimsby Town	H	D	0–0		2,216	
26 January 2008	22nd	Lincoln City	A	L	0–2		3,779	
29 January 2008	22nd	Wycombe Wanderers	A	W	1–0	Rainford (pen)	3,974	
2 February 2008	22nd	Stockport County	H	L	0–1		1,834	
9 February 2008	23rd	Hereford United	A	L	1–4	Strevens	2,594	
12 February 2008	22nd	Chester City	H	W	6–2	Strevens (2), Uddin, Rainford, Nurse, Hall	2,242	
16 February 2008	22nd	Grimsby Town	A	W	4–1	Smith, Rainford (2, 1 pen), Strevens	4,060	
23 February 2008	19th	Morecambe	H	W	2–0	Gain, Strevens	1,809	
26 February 2008	18th	Hereford United	H	W	1–0	Foster	1,929	
1 March 2008	18th	Bradford City	A	W	2–0	Arber, Strevens	13,537	
8 March 2008	18th	Peterborough United	H	L	2–3	Rainford (pen), Hall	3,130	
11 March 2008	19th	Macclesfield Town	H	L	0–1		1,350	
15 March 2008	20th	Milton Keynes Dons	A	L	0–4		9,417	
22 March 2008	20th	Shrewsbury Town	H	D	1–1	Benson	1,686	
24 March 2008	20th	Wrexham	A	D	0–0		4,692	
29 March 2008	21st	Chesterfield	H	L	0–3		2,054	
4 April 2008	21st	Accrington Stanley	A	L	0–1		1,262	
12 April 2008	22nd	Rochdale	H	D	1–1	Strevens	2,032	
19 April 2008	22nd	Rotherham United	A	L	1–2	Strevens	3,203	
26 April 2008	21st	Darlington	A	W	3–2	Sloma, Rainford (pen), Keltie (og)	3,709	
3 May 2008	20th	Mansfield Town	H	W	2–0	Strevens, Benson (pen)	3,451	

=== FA Cup ===
Round	Date	Opponents	Venue	Result	Score F–A	Scorers	Attendance	Ref
First round	10 November 2007	Hampton & Richmond Borough	A	W	3–0	Benson, Huke, Strevens	2,252	
Second round	1 December 2007	Kidderminster Harriers	H	W	3–1	Benson (2), Strevens	1,493	
Third round	5 January 2008	Southend United	A	L	2–5	Nurse, Strevens	6,393	

=== League Cup ===
Round	Date	Opponents	Venue	Result	Score F–A	Scorers	Attendance	Ref
First round	14 August 2007	Luton Town	H	L	1–2	Strevens	1,754	

=== Football League Trophy ===
Round	Date	Opponents	Venue	Result	Score F–A	Scorers	Attendance	Ref
First round	4 September 2007	Southend United	A	D	2–2^{[A]}	Saunders, Moore	5,215	
Second round	9 October 2007	Leyton Orient	A	W	1–0	Strevens	2,397	
Southern quarter final	13 November 2007	Gillingham	A	L	0–4		2,904	

== Player details ==
As of 15 February 2013.

Numbers in parentheses denote appearances as substitute.

No.	Position	Nationality	Name	Apps	Goals	Apps	Goals	Apps	Goals	Apps	Goals	Apps	Goals	Yellow card	Red card
No.	Position	Nationality	Name	League		FA Cup		League Cup		FL Trophy		Total		Discipline	
1	Goalkeeper	Wales	Tony Roberts	43	0	3	0	1	0	3	0	50	0	1	1
2	Defender	Nigeria	Magnus Okuonghae	9 (1)	0	0	0	0	0	1	0	10 (1)	0	0	0
3	Defender	England	Sam Sloma	22 (7)	2	3	0	1	0	2 (1)	0	28 (8)	2	2	0
4	Defender	England	Lee Goodwin	0 (1)	0	0	0	0	0	0	0	0 (1)	0	0	0
5	Defender	England	Jon Boardman	22 (5)	0	3	0	1	0	2	0	28 (5)	0	5	0
6	Defender	Australia	Shane Huke	31 (5)	2	3	1	0 (1)	0	3	0	37 (6)	3	2	0
7	Midfielder	England	Sam Saunders	21 (1)	0	1	0	1	0	1	1	24 (1)	1	2	0
8	Midfielder	England	Glen Southam	44 (1)	2	3	0	1	0	3	0	51 (1)	2	3	0
9	Forward	Barbados	Jon Nurse	23 (7)	1	1 (1)	1	1	0	0 (2)	0	25 (10)	2	3	0
10	Midfielder	Northern Ireland	Richard Graham	4 (3)	0	0	0	0	0	0 (1)	0	4 (4)	0	0	0
11	Midfielder	England	Dave Rainford	28 (1)	8	1	0	1	0	3	0	33 (1)	8	2	1
12	Defender	England	Scott Griffiths	41	0	3	0	1	0	3	0	48	0	1	0
14	Forward	England	Paul Benson	19 (3)	6	2	3	0	0	2	0	23 (3)	9	2	0
15	Defender	England	Anwar Uddin	40 (1)	1	2 (1)	0	1	0	2	0	45 (2)	1	1	0
16	Forward	England	Jamie Taylor	2 (10)	1	0 (1)	0	0	0	2 (1)	0	4 (12)	1	0	0
17	Midfielder	England	Bai Mass Lette Jallow	0	0	0	0	0	0	0	0	0	0	0	0
18	Forward	England	Ben Strevens	39 (7)	15	2 (1)	3	0 (1)	1	2	1	43 (9)	20	4	0
19	Defender	England	Danny Foster	31 (1)	1	3	0	1	0	0	0	35 (1)	1	2	0
20	Defender	Canada	Ross Smith	23	1	1 (1)	0	0	0	1 (1)	0	25 (2)	1	1	0
21	Midfielder	England	Dominic Green	2 (10)	0	0	0	0	0	0	0	2 (10)	0	0	0
22	Midfielder	England	Marlon Patterson	5 (1)	0	0	0	0	0	0	0	5 (1)	0	0	0
23	Forward	Wales	Chris Moore	13 (13)	2	2	0	1	0	1 (2)	1	17 (15)	3	5	0
24	Defender	England	Anthony Cook	0 (1)	0	0	0	0	0	0	0	0 (1)	0	0	0
25	Midfielder	Nigeria	Solomon Taiwo	4 (6)	0	0	0	0	0	1	0	5 (6)	0	1	2
26	Midfielder	England	Tommy Tejan-Sie	0	0	0	0	0	0	0	0	0	0	0	0
27	Goalkeeper	England	Dave Hogan	0	0	0	0	0	0	0	0	0	0	0	0
28	Forward	England	Jacob Erskine	0	0	0	0	0	0	0	0	0	0	0	0
29	Forward	England	Kraig Rochester	0	0	0	0	0	0	0	0	0	0	0	0
30	Goalkeeper	England	Ed Thompson	3	0	0 (1)	0	0	0	0	0	3 (1)	0	0	0
31	Midfielder	England	Ryan Hall	2 (6)	2	0	0	0	0	0	0	2 (6)	2	0	0
32	Forward	England	Shabazz Baidoo	1 (2)	0	0	0	0	0	0	0	1 (2)	0	0	0
33	Midfielder	Ireland	Peter Gain	18	1	0	0	0	0	0	0	18	1	5	0
34	Defender	England	Mark Arber	16	1	0	0	0	0	0	0	16	1	0	0
35	Forward	England	Kayan Kalipha	0	0	0	0	0	0	0	0	0	0	0	0

== Footnotes ==
A. Dagenham & Redbridge won 7–6 on penalties following a 2–2 draw after 90 minutes.
