= 2008–09 Dagenham & Redbridge F.C. season =

Dagenham & Redbridge
2008–09 season
- Chairman: David Andrews
- Manager: John Still
- Stadium: Victoria Road
- Football League Two: 8th
- FA Cup: Second round
- Football League Cup: First round
- Football League Trophy: Southern quarter final
- Top goalscorer: League: Paul Benson (18); All: Paul Benson (21)
- Highest home attendance: 4,791 (v Shrewsbury Town, League Two, 2 May 2009)
- Lowest home attendance: 1,302 (v Lincoln City, League Two, 3 March 2009)
- Average home league attendance: 2,047

The 2008–09 season was the 2nd season in the Football League played by Dagenham & Redbridge F.C., an English football club based in Dagenham, Greater London. It was their second consecutive season in Football League Two after promotion from the Football Conference in 2007. The season covers the period from 1 July 2008 to 30 June 2009.

== Match results ==
League positions are sourced from Statto, while the remaining contents of each table are sourced from the references in the "Ref" column.

=== League Two ===
==== League table ====
Pos	Team	Pld	W	D	L	GF	GA	GD	Pts	Promotion, qualification or relegation
6	Rochdale	46	19	13	14	70	59	+11	70	Qualification for League Two play-offs
7	Shrewsbury Town	46	17	18	11	61	44	+17	69	Qualification for League Two play-offs
8	Dagenham & Redbridge	46	19	11	16	77	53	+24	68	
9	Bradford City	46	18	13	15	66	55	+11	67	
10	Chesterfield	46	16	15	15	62	57	+5	63	

Source: The Football League
Rules for classification: 1) points; 2) goal difference; 3) number of goals scored.

==== Matches ====
Date	League position	Opponents	Venue	Result	Score F–A	Scorers	Attendance	Ref
9 August 2008	1st	Chester City	H	W	6–0	Green, Strevens (pen), Saunders (2), Benson, Nwokeji	1,434	
16 August 2008	1st	Lincoln City	A	W	3–1	Strevens (2), Benson	3,581	
23 August 2008	4th	Port Vale	H	D	1–1	Benson	1,843	
30 August 2008	1st	Morecambe	A	W	2–1	Saunders, Taiwo	1,571	
6 September 2008	4th	Brentford	A	L	1–2	Saunders	4,519	
13 September 2008	5th	Chesterfield	H	W	3–0	Saunders, Nwokeji, Benson	1,682	
20 September 2008	5th	Wycombe Wanderers	A	L	1–2	Strevens	4,132	
27 September 2008	6th	Rotherham United	H	D	1–1	Benson	1,805	
4 October 2008	5th	Rochdale	A	W	2–0	Benson, Ritchie	2,566	
10 October 2008	2nd	Barnet	H	W	2–0	Ritchie, Strevens	2,629	
18 October 2008	4th	Bury	H	L	1–3	Saunders	2,364	
21 October 2008	6th	Bournemouth	A	L	1–2	Nurse	3,554	
25 October 2008	9th	Darlington	A	L	0–3		3,070	
28 October 2008	7th	Grimsby Town	H	W	4–0	Arber, Strevens (2), Benson	1,622	
1 November 2008	8th	Accrington Stanley	H	D	0–0		1,433	
15 November 2008	10th	Luton Town	A	L	1–2	Okuonghae	5,402	
22 November 2008	9th	Notts County	H	W	6–1	Ritchie, Strevens, Benson (3), Okuonghae	1,743	
25 November 2008	10th	Shrewsbury Town	A	L	1–2	Saunders	4,590	
6 December 2008	11th	Bradford City	A	D	1–1	Ritchie	12,145	
20 December 2008	10th	Macclesfield Town	A	W	4–0	Benson (2), Taiwo, Saunders	1,909	
26 December 2008	7th	Gillingham	H	W	2–0	Strevens, Benson	2,844	
28 December 2008	4th	Aldershot Town	A	W	2–1	Taiwo, Nurse	3,697	
3 January 2009	4th	Rotherham United	A	D	1–1	Ritchie	3,307	
17 January 2009	6th	Barnet	A	D	1–1	Nwokeji	2,366	
20 January 2009	8th	Exeter City	H	L	1–2	Strevens	2,053	
24 January 2009	5th	Rochdale	H	W	3–2	Arber, Ritchie, Southam	1,808	
27 January 2009	5th	Grimsby Town	A	D	1–1	Nurse	3,431	
31 January 2009	8th	Darlington	H	L	0–1		1,832	
7 February 2009	9th	Bury	A	D	2–2	Nurse, Benson	2,530	
14 February 2009	8th	Luton Town	H	W	2–1	Foster (2)	2,310	
17 February 2009	9th	Wycombe Wanderers	H	L	0–1		2,242	
21 February 2009	10th	Accrington Stanley	A	D	0–0		1,123	
24 February 2009	10th	Bournemouth	H	L	0–1		1,602	
28 February 2009	9th	Chester City	A	D	2–2	Strevens, Ritchie	1,416	
3 March 2009	9th	Lincoln City	H	L	0–3		1,302	
7 March 2009	9th	Morecambe	H	L	0–2		1,403	
10 March 2009	9th	Port Vale	A	W	1–0	Guy	4,090	
14 March 2009	9th	Chesterfield	A	D	1–1	Saunders	3,007	
28 March 2009	10th	Macclesfield Town	H	W	2–1	Benson, Ritchie	1,347	
4 April 2009	10th	Exeter City	A	L	1–2	Strevens	5,123	
11 April 2009	10th	Aldershot Town	H	W	3–1	Benson, Saunders (pen), Ritchie	1,586	
13 April 2009	10th	Gillingham	A	L	1–2	Saunders	6,945	
18 April 2009	9th	Bradford City	H	W	3–0	Saunders, Benson, Strevens	1,883	
21 April 2009	7th	Brentford	H	W	3–1	Saunders, Taiwo, Arber	3,537	
25 April 2009	7th	Notts County	A	W	3–0	Saunders, Ritchie (2)	4,419	
2 May 2009	8th	Shrewsbury Town	H	L	1–2	Benson	4,791	

=== FA Cup ===
Round	Date	Opponents	Venue	Result	Score F–A	Scorers	Attendance	Ref
First round	8 November 2008	Hereford United	A	D	0–0		1,825	
First round replay	18 November 2008	Hereford United	H	W	2–1	Benson, Taiwo	1,409	
Second round	29 November 2008	Leicester City	A	L	2–3	Ritchie, Strevens	7,791	

=== League Cup ===
Round	Date	Opponents	Venue	Result	Score F–A	Scorers	Attendance	Ref
First round	12 August 2008	Reading	H	L	1–2	Taiwo	2,360	

=== Football League Trophy ===
Round	Date	Opponents	Venue	Result	Score F–A	Scorers	Attendance	Ref
First round	2 September 2008	Barnet	H	W	4–2	Benson (2), Nwokeji, Southam (pen)	1,412	
Second round	7 October 2008	Peterborough United	A	W	1–0	Nwokeji	2,644	
Southern quarter final	4 November 2008	Shrewsbury Town	A	L	0–5		2,747	

== Player details ==
As of 15 February 2013.

Numbers in parentheses denote appearances as substitute.
Players with names struck through and marked † left the club during the playing season.
Players with names in italics and marked * were on loan from another club for the whole of their season with Dagenham & Redbridge.
Players listed with no appearances have been in the matchday squad but only as unused substitutes.
Key to positions: GK – Goalkeeper; DF – Defender; MF – Midfielder; FW – Forward

No.	Pos.	Nat.	Name	League		FA Cup		League Cup		FL Trophy		Total		Discipline	
No.	Pos.	Nat.	Name	Apps	Goals	Apps	Goals	Apps	Goals	Apps	Goals	Apps	Goals	A yellow rectangle, denoting the yellow penalty card shown to a player being cautioned	A red rectangle, denoting the red penalty card shown to a player being sent off
1	GK	WAL	Tony Roberts	43	0	3	0	1	0	2	0	49	0	0	0
2	DF	NGA	Magnus Okuonghae	45	2	3	0	1	0	3	0	52	2	6	0
3	MF	SCO	Matt Ritchie *	36 (1)	11	3	1	0	0	0 (1)	0	39 (2)	12	2	0
4	DF	ENG	~~Aiden Palmer *~~ †	3	0	0	0	0	0	0	0	3	0	0	0
4	DF	ENG	Scott Doe	0	0	0	0	0	0	0	0	0	0	0	0
5	DF	ENG	Jon Boardman	0	0	0	0	0	0	1	0	1	0	0	0
6	MF	AUS	~~Shane Huke~~ †	0 (1)	0	0	0	0	0	1 (1)	0	2 (1)	0	0	0
6	MF	ENG	~~Doug Loft *~~ †	10 (1)	0	0	0	0	0	0	0	10 (1)	0	1	0
6	GK	ENG	David Button *	3	0	0	0	0	0	0	0	3	0	0	0
7	MF	ENG	Sam Saunders	40	14	3	0	1	0	1	0	45	14	5	1
8	MF	ENG	Glen Southam	17 (13)	1	0 (2)	0	0	0	3	1	20 (15)	2	4	0
9	FW	BRB	Jon Nurse	16 (18)	4	0 (2)	0	0	0	2 (1)	0	18 (21)	4	3	0
10	MF	NIR	Richard Graham	3 (2)	0	0	0	0	0	3	0	6 (2)	0	1	0
11	FW	ENG	Mark Nwokeji	3 (13)	3	0 (1)	0	0	0	2 (1)	2	5 (15)	5	1	0
12	DF	ENG	Scott Griffiths	43 (1)	0	3	0	1	0	3	0	50 (1)	0	1	0
14	FW	ENG	Paul Benson	31 (2)	18	3	1	1	0	3	2	38 (2)	21	2	0
15	DF	ENG	Anwar Uddin	10 (7)	0	0	0	1	0	3	0	13 (7)	0	2	0
16	FW	ENG	Wes Thomas	1 (4)	0	0	0	0	0	0	0	1 (4)	0	0	0
17	MF	ENG	Bai Mass Lette Jallow	0	0	0	0	0	0	0	0	0	0	0	0
18	FW	ENG	Ben Strevens	46	13	3	1	1	0	0 (2)	0	50 (2)	14	5	0
19	DF	ENG	Danny Foster	38	2	3	0	0	0	1	0	42	2	3	0
20	FW	ENG	Daniel Charge	0 (1)	0	0	0	0	0	0	0	0 (1)	0	0	0
21	MF	ENG	~~Dominic Green~~ †	2	1	0	0	0	1	0	0	3	1	0	0
21	MF	COD	~~Peggy Lokando *~~ †	0	0	0	0	0	0	0 (1)	0	0 (1)	0	0	0
21	DF	ENG	~~Arron Fray~~ †	0	0	0	0	0	0	0	0	0	0	0	0
21	MF	ENG	Richard Priest	0	0	0	0	0	0	0	0	0	0	0	0
22	DF	ENG	~~Marlon Patterson~~ †	0	0	0	0	0	0	1	0	1	0	0	0
22	MF	ENG	Graeme Montgomery	0 (5)	0	0	0	0	0	0	0	0 (5)	0	0	0
23	FW	ENG	Kayan Kalipha	0	0	0	0	0	0	0	0	0	0	0	0
24	DF	ENG	~~Anthony Cook~~ †	0	0	0	0	0	0	0	0	0	0	0	0
24	DF	ENG	Billy Bingham	0	0	0	0	0	0	0	0	0	0	0	0
25	MF	NGA	Solomon Taiwo	39 (1)	4	3	1	1	1	2	0	45 (1)	6	6	0
26	MF	ENG	Tommy Tejan-Sie	0 (1)	0	0	0	0	0	0 (2)	0	0 (3)	0	0	0
27	GK	ENG	Dave Hogan	0 (1)	0	0	0	0	0	0	0	0 (1)	0	0	0
28	FW	ENG	Jacob Erskine	0	0	0	0	0	0	0	0	0	0	0	0
29	FW	ENG	Kraig Rochester	0	0	0	0	0	0	0	0	0	0	0	0
30	GK	ENG	~~Ed Thompson~~ †	0 (1)	0	0	0	0	0	1	0	1 (1)	0	0	0
30	FW	ENG	Jamie Guy *	5 (4)	1	0	0	0	0	0	0	5 (4)	1	0	0
31	DF	ENG	Michael Alaile	0	0	0	0	0	0	0	0	0	0	0	0
32	FW	ENG	Hakeem Araba	0	0	0	0	0	0	0	0	0	0	0	0
33	MF	IRL	Peter Gain	30 (1)	0	3	0	1	0	1	0	35 (1)	0	5	0
34	DF	ENG	Mark Arber	42	3	3	0	1	0	0	0	46	3	3	0
35	DF	ENG	Harlee Dean	0	0	0	0	0	0	0	0	0	0	0	0
