= Scott Doe =

English footballer

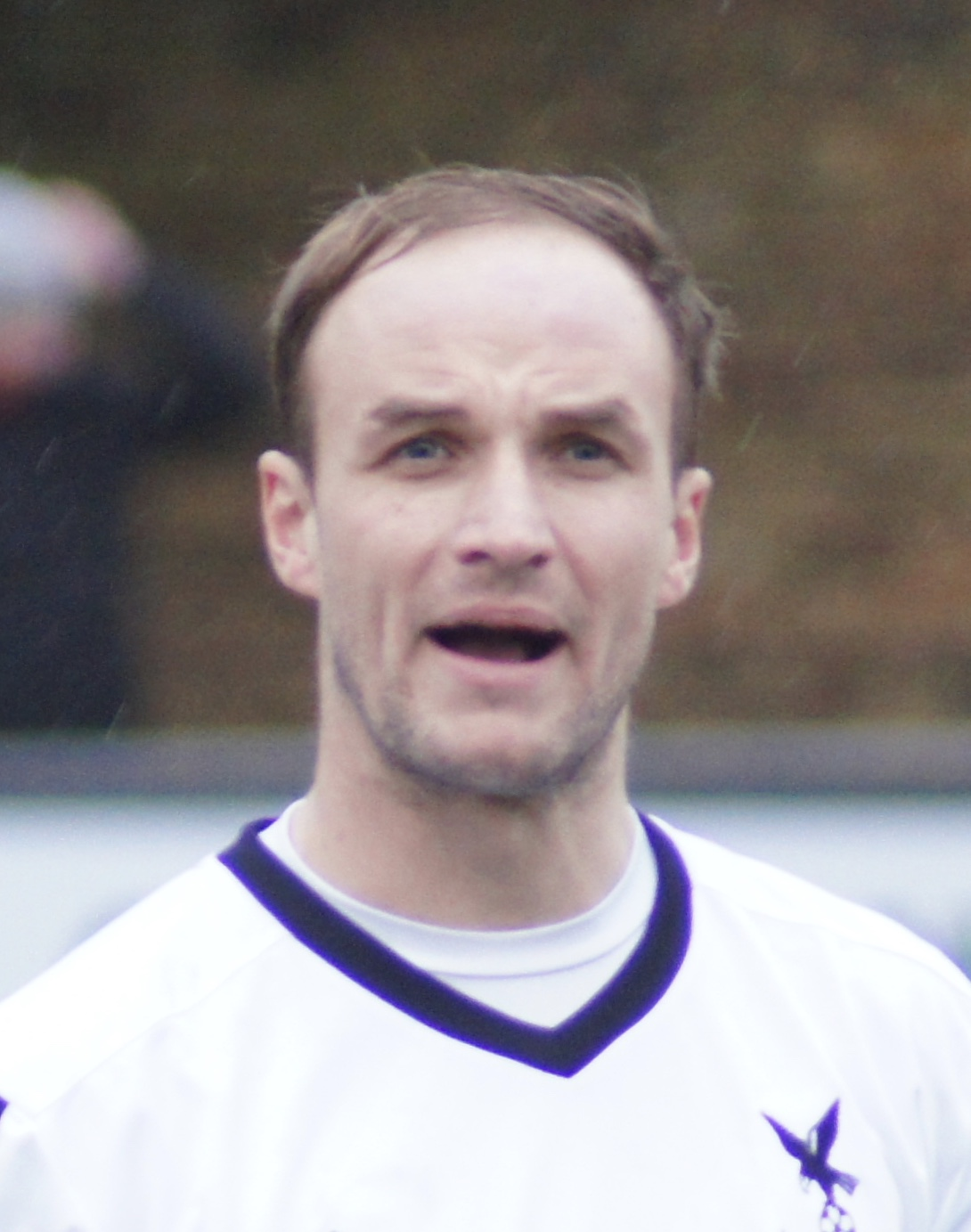
- Doe with Whitehawk in 2018

Personal information
- Full name: Scott Mark Doe
- Date of birth: 6 November 1988 (age 38)
- Place of birth: Reading, England
- Height: 6 ft 1 in (1.85 m)
- Position: Defender

Team information
- Current team: Soul Tower Hamlets

Youth career
- –2005: AFC Newbury
- 2005–2007: Swindon Town

Senior career*
Years	Team	Apps	(Gls)
2007–2009	Weymouth	63	(2)
2009	Kettering Town	0	(0)
2009	→ Dagenham & Redbridge (loan)	0	(0)
2009–2015	Dagenham & Redbridge	243	(11)
2015–2016	Boreham Wood	45	(3)
2016–2018	Dagenham & Redbridge	56	(4)
2018	Whitehawk	3	(0)
2018	Boreham Wood	2	(0)
2018	Billericay Town	13	(1)
2018–2020	Dover Athletic	34	(3)
2020–2021	Romford	3	(0)
2021	Welling United	2	(0)
2021–2022	Hythe Town	8	(0)
2022	Barnstaple Town	0	(0)
2022	Whitstable Town	6	(1)
2022–2024	Romford	2	(0)
2024	Saffron Walden Town		
2024	Romford		
2024–2025	Rayners Lane	10	(0)
2025	Romford	3	(1)
2025	→ Brentwood Town (dual-registration)	1	(0)
2025	→ Barking (dual-registration)	3	(0)
2025–	Soul Tower Hamlets	0	(0)

International career
2009	England C	1	(0)
- * Club domestic league appearances and goals as of 17:20, 26 November 2025 (UTC)

Scott Mark Doe (born 6 November 1988) is an English semi-professional footballer who plays as a defender for Essex Senior League club Soul Tower Hamlets.

Doe started his career with Swindon Town as a youth player before joining Conference Premier club Weymouth. In February 2009, he left Weymouth due to financial problems at the club and registered with Kettering Town to allow him to join Dagenham & Redbridge on loan until the end of the 2008–09 season. He was refused permission to join Dagenham on a permanent basis by The Football Association as the move was outside the transfer window. Doe has also represented the England C team, making one appearance against Malta under-21s.

== Early career ==
Doe was born in Reading, Berkshire. As a youth player, he played as a forward for AFC Newbury and Newbury and District Schools alongside Theo Walcott, before the duo signed for Swindon Town. They played together for four years. He said in one season, that his partnership with Walcott consisted of them scoring about 150 goals. During a tournament in Cardiff, Doe was converted into a centre-back. Doe was with Swindon Town from the age of 10, until he was deemed surplus to requirements by manager Paul Sturrock, and he left in July 2007.

== Club career ==
=== Weymouth ===
Doe joined Conference Premier club Weymouth on 1 July 2007, along with Swindon Town youth teammate Jon Stewart, where he signed a one-year contract. His debut for Weymouth was in the 3–0 home win during a pre-season friendly against League Two side Bournemouth on 17 July. He made his competitive debut for his new club on 15 September in the 3–1 away win at Droylsden, replacing Conal Platt as a substitute in the 65th minute. Doe's first start for Weymouth was against Torquay United on 25 September, in their 3–2 away defeat. His first goal for the club was scored on 26 January 2008, away at Rushden & Diamonds, as Weymouth were defeated 3–2. Paolo Vernazza took a free kick in the 25th minute after Stuart Beavon was fouled just outside the penalty area by Curtis Osano. Doe scored with a header, which took a slight deflection as the ball crossed the goal line. During Weymouth's 2–1 away defeat on 1 March to Halifax Town, Doe was controversially sent off three minutes into stoppage time. He was sent off for a tackle on Andy Campbell, but manager John Hollins claimed "there is no doubt that Scott got the ball". Weymouth finished the season in 18th position, defying relegation, with Doe ending the 2007–08 season having made 33 appearances in the Conference, scoring once. Doe won the "Supporters Player of The Year" award, describing it as "the best thing in the World". He admitted he did not expect to play more than 15 games during the season, saying "when I first came to the club I thought I might play 15 games throughout the whole season but I have ended up playing over twice that and it has just been fantastic" stated Doe.

Along with Anton Robinson, Marcus Browning and Stuart Beavon, Doe signed a new contract with Weymouth in May 2008. His only goal for Weymouth in the 2008–09 season was against Forest Green Rovers on 25 August, after scoring the equalizer to make the score 1–1 in the 71st minute, with a tap-in following a cross from Ryan Williams. In September, Doe was transfer listed, alongside James Coutts, Danny Knowles, Josh Webb and Michael Malcolm to generate money and bring new players to the club. He responded to being transfer listed by saying "I do not see it as a big deal. It's not like the club has said to me we are putting you on the transfer list because we do not want you anymore", and suggested it could benefit both parties if a bigger club were willing to "pay a bit of money". On 4 October, Doe was sent off in Weymouth's 3–2 home win over Eastbourne Borough, after he committed a foul on Andy Atkin in the penalty area, which resulted in a penalty kick that was later saved. Southern League Premier Division club Farnborough approached Doe on 30 December. He turned the offer down saying; "moving to Farnborough would mean stepping down two levels which is not what I want to do". His last game for Weymouth was against Stevenage Borough on 14 February, in the 3–0 home defeat.

=== Dagenham & Redbridge ===
Doe agreed to sign for League Two side Dagenham & Redbridge on a two-and-a-half-year contract in February 2009, initially on loan. He was also offered a contract at League One club Peterborough United. Financial troubles at Weymouth resulted in a number of first-team players not being paid. Due to the situation at Weymouth, The Football Association gave him special dispensation to move anywhere, although the Football League refused to allow him to join Dagenham as it was outside the transfer window. Subsequently, Doe registered for another Conference Premier team, Kettering Town, and joined Dagenham on an emergency loan until the end of the 2008–09 season. He signed for Dagenham on a permanent basis on a two-and-a-half-year contract in March. He made his debut on the opening day of the 2009–10 season, after starting in a 2–1 victory over Crewe Alexandra. At the end of the season, Doe was runner-up to Mark Arber for Dagenham & Redbridge's "Player of the Year" award. In June 2015, Doe rejected a new contract extension and left the club having made 266 appearances, scoring 11 goals.

=== Boreham Wood ===
After leaving Dagenham & Redbridge, Doe signed for newly promoted National League side Boreham Wood in July 2015.

=== Return to Dagenham and later career ===
In May 2016, he re-signed for Dagenham & Redbridge after their relegation to the National League along with Luke Howell on a free transfer, re-uniting with former manager John Still.

In February 2018, Doe was released by the Daggers and briefly joined Brighton-based National League South side Whitehawk, before signing once more for Boreham Wood. In July 2018, he signed for Billericay Town. On 8 December 2018, Doe signed for Dover Athletic after leaving Billericay where he made 13 league appearances, scoring one goal. On 23 January 2021, Doe signed for National League South side Welling United. In August 2021, Doe joined Hythe Town.

In March 2022, Doe left Hythe Town to join Barnstaple Town. Doe was released from Barnstaple however after just two weeks, and subsequently returned to Kent to sign for Whitstable Town.

In July 2022, he was training with Sheppey United and has played for them in the pre-season leading up to the 2022–23 Isthmian League season. Ahead of the new season, Doe returned to Romford.

After spells with Saffron Walden Town and Romford, Doe moved to Isthmian League South Central side Rayners Lane in November 2024.

In January 2025, Doe returned to Romford, joining Brentwood Town on dual-registration terms the following month.

In March 2025, Doe joined Barking on a similar deal, making his debut in a 5-0 win over Benfleet on March 4.

In September 2025, Doe joined Essex Senior Football League club Soul Tower Hamlets.

== International career ==
Doe was called up to the England C squad in February 2009, by manager Paul Fairclough, to face the Malta under-21 team. He came on as a second-half substitute in the 4–0 victory at Hibernians Football Ground, Paola, on 17 February.

== Style of play ==
Doe is able to play as a centre-back or full-back and is a "strong player" with good positional sense.

== Career statistics ==
As of end of 2020–21 season

Appearances and goals by club, season and competition
Club	Season	League			FA Cup		League Cup		Other		Total	
Club	Season	Division	Apps	Goals	Apps	Goals	Apps	Goals	Apps	Goals	Apps	Goals
Weymouth	2007–08	Conference Premier	34	1	4	0	—		6 (Note: Three appearances in FA Trophy, three in Conference League Cup)	0	44	1
Weymouth	2008–09	Conference Premier	29	1	1	0	—		2 (Note: One appearance in Conference League Cup, one in FA Trophy)	0	32	1
Weymouth	Total		63	2	5	0	—		8	0	76	2
Kettering Town	2008–09	Conference Premier	0	0	—		—		—		0	0
Dagenham & Redbridge (loan)	2008–09	League Two	0	0	—		—		—		0	0
Dagenham & Redbridge	2009–10	League Two	42	0	1	0	1	0	3 (Note: Appearances in League Two play-offs)	0	47	0
Dagenham & Redbridge	2010–11	League One	38	0	0	0	1	0	0	0	39	0
Dagenham & Redbridge	2011–12	League Two	41	6	5	0	1	0	2 (Note: Appearance(s) in Football League Trophy)	0	49	6
Dagenham & Redbridge	2012–13	League Two	46	3	1	0	1	0	2	0	50	3
Dagenham & Redbridge	2013–14	League Two	37	1	1	0	1	0	1	0	40	1
Dagenham & Redbridge	2014–15	League Two	39	1	0	0	1	0	1	0	41	1
Dagenham & Redbridge	Total		243	11	8	0	6	0	9	0	266	11
Boreham Wood	2015–16	National League	45	3	3	0	—		1 (Note: Appearance in FA Trophy)	0	49	3
Dagenham & Redbridge	2016–17	National League	39	3	3	0	—		3 (Note: Two appearances in National League play-offs, one in FA Trophy)	0	45	3
Dagenham & Redbridge	2017–18	National League	17	1	2	0	—		1	0	20	1
Dagenham & Redbridge	Total		56	4	5	0	—		4	0	65	4
Whitehawk	2017–18	National League South	3	0	—		—		—		3	0
Boreham Wood	2017–18	National League	2	0	—		—		2 (Note: Appearance in National League play-offs)	0	4	0
Billericay Town	2018–19	National League South	13	1	5	0	—		1	0	19	1
Dover Athletic	2018–19	National League	19	2	—		—		—		19	2
Dover Athletic	2019–20	National League	15	1	2	0	—		0	0	17	1
Dover Athletic	Total		34	1	2	0	—		0	0	36	3
Romford	2020–21	Isthmian League North Division	3	0	—		—		—		3	0
Welling United	2020–21	National League South	2	0	0	0	—		0	0	2	0
Whitstable Town	2021–22	Isthmian League South East Division	6	1	0	0	---		0	0	6	1
Romford	2022–23	Essex Senior League	26	2	3	0	---		6	2	35	4
Romford	2023–24	Essex Senior League	30 (2PO)	0	2	0	---		11	0	43	0
Romford	2024-25	Essex Senior League	7	2	0	0	---		0	0	7	2
Romford	Total		63	4	3	0	---		17	0	85	6
Soul Tower Hamlets	2025-26	Essex Senior League	8	0	0	0	---		3	0	11	0
Career total			541	29	33	0	6	0	39	0	625	31

== Honours ==
Dagenham & Redbridge

- Football League Two play-offs: 2010

Romford

- FA Vase: 2024

=== Individual ===
- Romford FC Player of the Season - 2023-24
