= Jon Nurse =

Barbadian football coach and former player

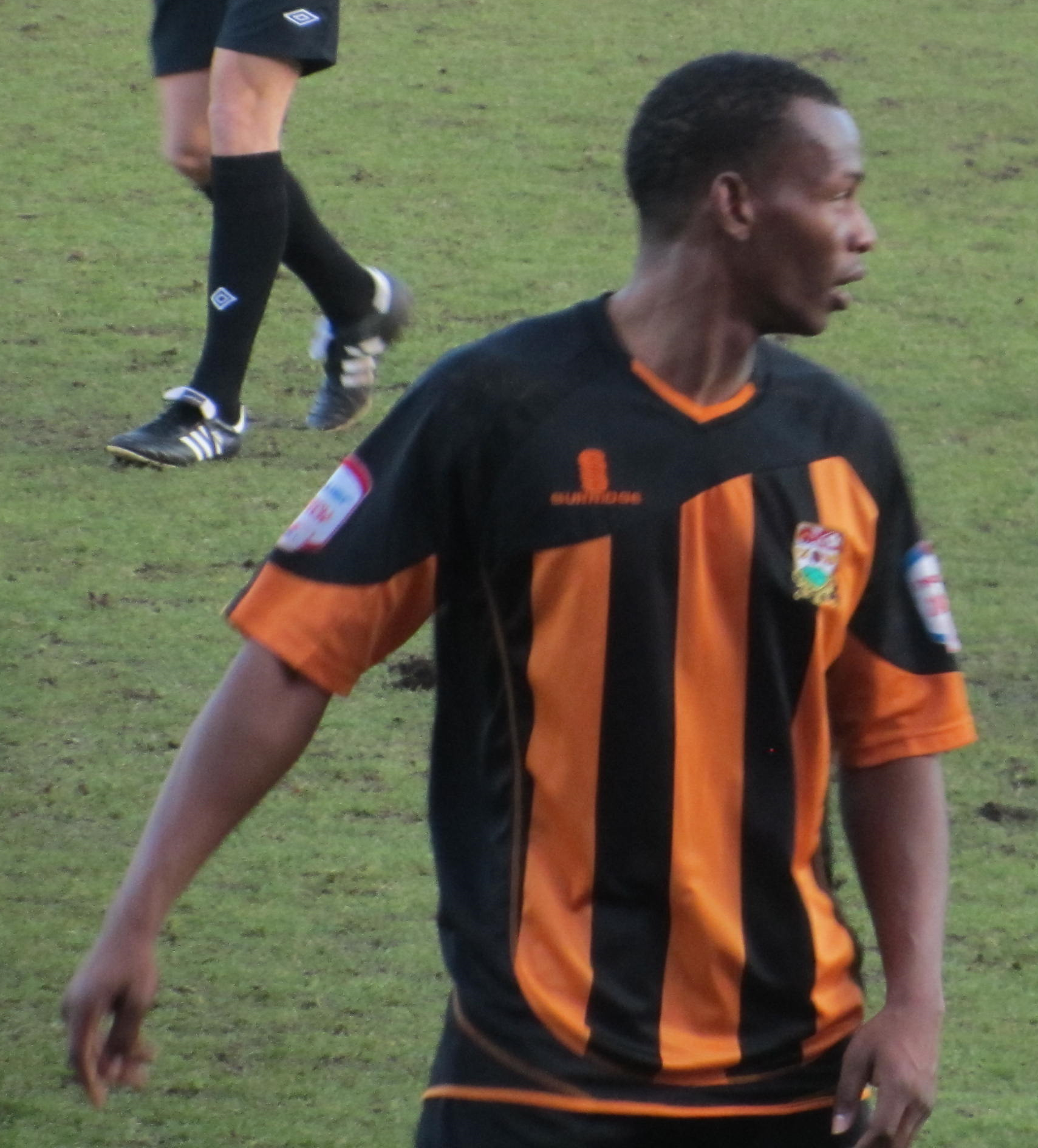
- Nurse playing for Barnet in 2013

Personal information
- Full name: Jonathan David Nurse
- Date of birth: 1 March 1981 (age 45)
- Place of birth: Bridgetown, Barbados
- Height: 5 ft 10 in (1.78 m)
- Positions: Winger; striker

Team information
- Current team: Enfield Town (head of football operations)

Senior career*
Years	Team	Apps	(Gls)
2003–2004	Sutton United	28	(19)
2004–2007	Stevenage Borough	87	(18)
2005	→ Lewes (loan)	7	(3)
2006	→ Woking (loan)	8	(2)
2007–2012	Dagenham & Redbridge	179	(27)
2012–2015	Barnet	55	(5)
2014	→ Farnborough (loan)	5	(1)
2015–2018	Metropolitan Police	14	(3)
2015	Loxwood		
Total		383	(78)

International career
2008–2011	Barbados	6	(0)
- * Club domestic league appearances and goals

Jonathan David Nurse (born 28 March 1981) is a Barbadian football coach and former professional footballer who is head of football operations at National League South club Enfield Town. Primarily a striker, he was also deployed as a winger during his career.

Nurse began his senior career at Sutton United before signing for Stevenage Borough ahead of the 2004–05 season, during which he was loaned to Lewes. He played regularly on his return as the club reached the Conference National play-off final, and later had a brief loan at Woking. He remained at Stevenage for three seasons, helping them win the FA Trophy in 2007, the first competitive final at the new Wembley Stadium. That summer, he moved into the Football League with Dagenham & Redbridge, where he made 205 appearances across five years and scored the decisive goal in the 2010 League Two play-off final as the club secured promotion to League One.

He joined Barnet in 2012, spending three seasons with the club and contributing to their promotion back to the Football League during the 2014–15 season, by which time he assumed player-coach responsibilities. Nurse later signed for Metropolitan Police in the summer of 2015, where he was appointed player-coach before transitioning into full-time coaching. At international level, he earned six caps for Barbados.

== Early life ==
Nurse was born in Bridgetown, Barbados, and relocated to England in 1984, taking up residence in Fulham, London, where he lived with his mother and grandparents. His mother is of Jamaican descent and his father is Guyanese.

== Club career ==
=== Early career ===
Nurse began playing football for Malden Vale under-13s, later representing Wallington Wanderers until the age of 17. During this period, he had unsuccessful trials at both Crystal Palace and Wimbledon. Nurse subsequently joined Sutton Athletic, a Sunday league team competing in the Morden and District League. Reflecting on this period, Nurse later stated that he "went on to score lots of goals and was lucky enough to appear in a number of finals and promotion-winning teams", and credited the experience as the time when he "really learnt how to play football". In 2002, he joined Nuwood of the Surrey South Eastern Combination, and after impressing that season, he subsequently signed for Sutton United. After initially playing in the reserve team at the start of the 2003–04 season, scoring regularly, he was promoted to the first team in October 2003. He made his first start for Sutton against Basingstoke Town, and shortly thereafter scored his first senior goal in a 1–0 away victory at Kettering Town. The goal served as the catalyst for a run of eight goals in as many games, scoring in eight consecutive matches. He concluded the season with 19 goals in 28 appearances. During the same season, he had a trial with Colchester United, who invited him back for a second assessment, and also entered discussions with Wimbledon regarding a potential trial.

=== Stevenage Borough ===
At the conclusion of the 2003–04 season, Nurse held discussions with Stevenage Borough manager Graham Westley and agreed to join the club on 12 June 2004. Reflecting on the move, Nurse later described being impressed by the club's facilities and vision, stating that Westley's approach and a visit to Broadhall Way were key factors in his decision, which he saw as an ideal opportunity to progress his career. He made his debut for Stevenage on the opening day of the 2004–05 season, playing the full match in a 3–1 defeat to Dagenham & Redbridge. His first goal for the club came on 21 September 2004, in his sixth appearance, scoring the second goal in a 3–0 win over Farnborough Town at Cherrywood Road. A succession of injuries limited his first-team opportunities during the season, and in January 2005, he was loaned to Conference South club Lewes. Nurse scored three goals in seven appearances at Lewes before returning to Stevenage in March 2005, where he regained his place in the starting line-up. He featured in all of the club's remaining fixtures that season as Stevenage qualified for the Conference National play-offs, appearing as a second-half substitute in the 1–0 play-off final defeat to Carlisle United at the Britannia Stadium. Nurse made 22 appearances and scored three goals during his first season with the club.

Nurse was a regular throughout the 2005–06 season, during which he was utilised as both a right winger and a striker. He finished the season with nine goals in 44 appearances as Stevenage missed out on a place in the play-offs. His performances earned him the runner-up position in the club's Player of the Year awards, finishing behind goalkeeper Alan Julian. Ahead of the 2006–07 season, under the new management of Mark Stimson, Nurse signed a two-year contract extension on 6 June 2006. Following a recovery from a double hernia operation, he was loaned to fellow Conference National club Woking on 25 August 2006, in order to regain his fitness. He featured regularly during the month-long loan spell, scoring two goals in eight appearances. Woking manager Glenn Cockerill expressed interest in extending the loan, but the request was declined by Stimson, who recalled Nurse on 26 September 2006. He scored a week later in a 2–2 draw away at Rushden & Diamonds, a goal he later described as one of his favourites, marking his first since returning from injury and loan. Nurse finished the season with ten goals, contributing to Stevenage's FA Trophy campaign, during which he scored twice in six matches en route to the final, the first competitive fixture at the new Wembley Stadium. He was an unused substitute in the final as Stevenage came from two goals behind to defeat Kidderminster Harriers and win the trophy. Over the course of his time at Stevenage, Nurse made 106 appearances, scoring 21 goals.

=== Dagenham & Redbridge ===
In May 2007, Nurse signed a two-year contract with newly promoted League Two club Dagenham & Redbridge. Manager John Still noted that he had previously attempted to sign Nurse in January 2007 as a potential replacement for Craig Mackail-Smith. Nurse described the move as an opportunity that he could not decline, citing the club's new Football League status, although acknowledged it was a difficult decision to leave Stevenage. He made his Football League debut on 11 August 2007, starting in Dagenham's first ever match at that level, a 1–0 defeat to Stockport County at Edgeley Park. He scored his first goal for the club four months later, in a 5–2 FA Cup defeat to Southend United on 5 January 2008, and scored his first league goal in a 6–2 victory over Chester City the following month. During the club's inaugural season in the Football League, Nurse made 35 appearances, scoring two goals, as the club secured their League Two status with a 20th-place finish.

After scoring his first goal of the 2008–09 season in a 2–1 away defeat to AFC Bournemouth on 21 October 2008, Nurse received praise from teammate Ben Strevens after the match, who stated that Nurse was often undervalued. During the season, Nurse made the majority of his appearances as a substitute, featuring in 39 matches, 18 of which were starts, and scored four times. Dagenham missed out on a play-off position, finishing one point behind seventh-placed Shrewsbury Town. Nurse signed a one-year contract extension on 30 June 2009, keeping him contracted to the club until the summer of 2010.

Nurse began the 2009–10 season by scoring three goals in his first three matches, as Dagenham briefly occupied first place in the League Two table during the early stages of the season. A goal in a 2–0 away victory against Darlington on 8 May 2010 helped the club secure qualification for the play-offs following a seventh-place finish. He started in the play-off final against Rotherham United at Wembley Stadium on 30 May 2010, scoring the decisive goal in the 70th-minute to secure a 3–2 victory. The win confirmed Dagenham's promotion to League One for the first time in the club's 18-year history. Nurse's goal came with the game level at 2–2, as the ball "dropped invitingly to him after Rotherham failed to clear a corner and his deflected strike came off Ellison and eluded Warrington". He finished the season with eight goals in 43 appearances. Following promotion and with his contract set to expire, Nurse signed a new two-year deal, keeping him contracted to Dagenham until May 2012.

Nurse played in Dagenham's first-ever League One fixture on 7 August 2010, coming on as a 65th-minute substitute in a 2–0 away defeat to Sheffield Wednesday at Hillsborough. He scored his first goal of the 2010–11 season on 25 September 2010, an injury-time equaliser in a 2–2 draw at Charlton Athletic. The goal, scored in the third minute of additional time, proved to be his only goal during the first half of the season. He scored twice in a 3–0 home victory over Carlisle United on the penultimate game of the season, a result that left Dagenham requiring at least a draw in their final match, away to Peterborough United, combined with favourable results elsewhere, to avoid relegation. Nurse started the decisive fixture, as Dagenham were defeated 5–0, confirming their relegation to League Two. He scored ten times in 28 starts during the season, in addition to 14 appearances as a substitute.

Returning to League Two for the 2011–12 season, Nurse was a regular starter as Dagenham won three of their opening four fixtures. This run included a 1–0 away victory against Bradford City on 20 August 2011, in which Nurse scored the winning goal at Valley Parade. He also scored in the club's 3–2 victory over Rotherham United on 28 January 2012, in what was a repeat scoreline of the 2010 League Two play-off final. It ultimately turned out to be Nurse's final goal for Dagenham. Nurse made his last appearance for the club in a 1–0 away victory over Port Vale on 31 March 2012, before his season was curtailed by injury. He made 46 appearances that season, including 43 starts, and scored eight goals. In May 2012, Nurse was released upon the expiry of his contract, bringing an end to his five-year tenure with the east London club. Over the course of his time at Dagenham & Redbridge, he made 205 appearances, scoring 32 goals. On his departure, Nurse stated he had met with manager John Still at the end of the season and was informed that, due to budgetary constraints, he would not be offered a new contract unless other players could be moved off the wage bill.

=== Barnet ===
Following his release from Dagenham, Nurse signed for League Two club Barnet on a free transfer on 19 July 2012. He scored on his debut, briefly giving Barnet the lead in a League Cup tie away to Birmingham City, heading in a cross from Jordan Brown. His first league goal for Barnet came in a 3–1 home defeat to York City on 25 August 2012. He made 28 appearances during the season, as Barnet were relegated to the Conference Premier. Nurse was placed on the transfer list by Barnet in June 2013.

Despite being placed on the transfer list, Nurse remained at Barnet for the 2013–14 season. He did not play in the opening two months of the season, eventually making his first appearance as an 88th-minute substitute in a 1–0 away victory over Hereford United on 19 October 2013. His first start of the season came in the Herts Senior Cup, scoring twice in a 4–1 win over Hatfield Town on 3 December 2013. He subsequently joined Conference South club Farnborough on a one-month deal on 31 January 2014. He scored once in five appearances during the loan agreement, before being recalled by Barnet on 27 February 2014 due to a number of injuries to the club's attacking options. Following the appointment of Martin Allen as manager, Nurse began playing more regularly, but at the end of the season, having made 19 appearances and scored twice, he was included in Barnet's list of released players. However, on 16 May 2014, he re-signed for Barnet as a player-coach, with Allen citing Nurse's UEFA 'B' Licence as a key factor in the decision to retain him in a dual role.

In his new role as player-coach for the 2014–15 season, Nurse played a largely peripheral role on the field, making 11 appearances, including five starts, as his coaching responsibilities became increasingly prominent. He was described as "an integral part of the coaching set-up" during the season. Barnet secured promotion back to League Two at the end of the season by winning the Conference Premier title, and Nurse was named Clubman of the Year at the club's annual Player of the Year awards ceremony. In June 2015, he departed Barnet by mutual consent in order to focus on his coaching career.

=== Metropolitan Police ===
Following his departure from Barnet, Nurse joined Isthmian League club Metropolitan Police for the 2015–16 season. Prior to signing for Met Police as a player, he had already been serving as head coach for their youth system up to under-16 level. He made his debut for Met Police in a 3–1 home defeat to Wingate & Finchley on 31 August 2015, and scored his first goal in the subsequent match, a 1–0 away win against former club Farnborough on 5 September 2015. In December 2015, Nurse was appointed first-team coach at Met Police, with his focus shifting to coaching while remaining available as a player when required. He made 12 appearances during the season, scoring twice. Additionally, during that season, Nurse also played for Southern Combination Football League club Loxwood. Loxwood were managed by Mark Beard, a former teammate of Nurse's at Stevenage, and he played for the club on a voluntary basis.

It was not initially disclosed whether Nurse would continue in his playing role going into the 2016–17 season and he did not feature in any of Met Police's matches in the opening two months of the season. However, he appeared as an 86th-minute substitute in a match away at Havant & Waterlooville on 18 October 2016, scoring the winning goal in stoppage time in a 2–1 victory. This proved to be one of two appearances Nurse would make during the season. He went on to make three substitute appearances in the opening months of the 2017–18 season, which marked the final competitive appearances of his playing career.

== International career ==
"It is an experience that I am incredibly proud of. To represent your country at any sport, at any level is a massive achievement. It is not obviously like playing for England because Barbados is a tiny country but nevertheless it is still a great honour".

— Nurse, on representing Barbados at international level.

Also eligible to represent Guyana and Jamaica through his parental heritage, Nurse was called up to represent Barbados, his country of birth, in early 2008, and subsequently made his international debut in a 2010 FIFA World Cup qualification match against Dominica on 16 February 2008. He played 55 minutes in a 1–1 draw in Roseau. Nurse earned his second cap in the return leg on 26 March 2008 in Bridgetown, playing 69 minutes in a 1–0 victory that secured Barbados' progression to the second round of qualification. The national team then faced the United States in the second round, with Nurse featuring in both fixtures in June 2008.

Nurse did not feature for Barbados again for over three years, but was recalled for two 2014 FIFA World Cup qualification matches in September 2011. He earned his fifth cap in a 2–0 away defeat to Guyana on 2 September 2011, a match in which his brother, Chris, was playing for the opposition. Four days later, on 6 September, he played the full 90 minutes in a 2–0 loss to Trinidad and Tobago at the Barbados National Stadium. This proved to be his final appearance at international level.

== Coaching career ==
Nurse holds a UEFA A Licence. He began his coaching career as head of youth development at Metropolitan Police, where he coached players up to under-16 level. He was appointed first-team coach at Barnet ahead of the 2014–15 season, during which the club secured the Conference Premier title. After leaving Barnet at the end of that season, Nurse was appointed first-team coach at Met Police in December 2015. In addition to his club responsibilities, Nurse also coaches at the Love The Ball (LTB) Academy in Sussex, an initiative he co-founded with his former Stevenage teammate Mark Beard.

=== Enfield Town ===
When Met Police manager Gavin Macpherson departed in order to join Enfield Town in May 2023, Nurse followed as assistant manager. In their first season, the club achieved promotion to the National League South via the play-offs. In June 2025, Nurse was appointed head of football operations at the club, with his role shifting to focus on the analytics department, recruitment, and long-term strategic planning. Macpherson stated that, while Nurse would be missed in a coaching capacity, the new role was better suited to his skill set and domestic circumstances.

== Personal life ==
Nurse's younger brother, Chris, also played professional football. The two were teammates during their time at Sutton United.

== Career statistics ==
=== Club ===
Club	Season	League			FA Cup		League Cup		Other		Total	
Club	Season	Division	Apps	Goals	Apps	Goals	Apps	Goals	Apps	Goals	Apps	Goals
Sutton United	2003–04	Isthmian Premier Division	28	19	0	0	—		0	0	28	19
Stevenage Borough	2004–05	Conference National	17	1	0	0	—		6 (Note: One appearance in FA Trophy; two appearances and two goals in Conference League Cup; three appearances in 2005 Conference National play-offs)	2	23	3
Stevenage Borough	2005–06	Conference National	39	9	4	0	—		1 (Note: Appearance(s) in Football League Trophy)	0	44	9
Stevenage Borough	2006–07	Conference National	31	8	2	0	—		6 (Note: Appearance(s) in FA Trophy)	1	39	9
Stevenage Borough	Total		87	18	6	0	0	0	13	3	106	21
Lewes (loan)	2004–05	Conference South	7	3	0	0	—		0	0	7	3
Woking (loan)	2006–07	Conference National	8	2	0	0	—		0	0	8	2
Dagenham & Redbridge	2007–08	League Two	30	1	2	1	1	0	2	0	35	2
Dagenham & Redbridge	2008–09	League Two	34	4	2	0	0	0	3	0	39	4
Dagenham & Redbridge	2009–10	League Two	38	7	1	0	0	0	4 (Note: One appearance in Football League Trophy; three appearances in 2010 League Two play-offs)	1	43	8
Dagenham & Redbridge	2010–11	League One	38	10	2	0	1	0	1	0	42	10
Dagenham & Redbridge	2011–12	League Two	39	5	6	3	1	0	0	0	46	8
Dagenham & Redbridge	Total		179	27	13	4	3	1	10	1	205	32
Barnet	2012–13	League Two	26	3	0	0	1	1	1	0	28	4
Barnet	2013–14	Conference Premier	18	2	1	0	—		2	0	21	2
Barnet	2014–15	Conference Premier	11	0	1	0	—		0	0	12	0
Barnet	Total		55	5	2	0	1	1	3	0	61	6
Farnborough (loan)	2013–14	Conference South	5	1	0	0	—		0	0	5	1
Metropolitan Police	2015–16	Isthmian Premier Division	10	2	2	0	—		0	0	12	2
Metropolitan Police	2016–17	Isthmian Premier Division	2	1	0	0	—		0	0	2	1
Metropolitan Police	2017–18	Isthmian Premier Division	2	0	0	0	—		1	0	3	0
Metropolitan Police	Total		14	3	2	0	0	0	1	0	17	3
Career totals			383	78	23	4	4	1	24	2	437	86

=== International ===
National team	Season	Apps	Goals
Barbados	2008	4	0
Barbados	2011	2	0
Total		6	0

== Honours ==
Stevenage Borough

- FA Trophy: 2006–07

Dagenham & Redbridge

- Football League Two play-offs: 2010

Barnet

- Conference Premier: 2014–15
