= Scott Griffiths =

English footballer (born 1985)

Personal information
- Full name: Scott Robert Griffiths
- Date of birth: 27 November 1985 (age 40)
- Place of birth: Westminster, England
- Height: 5 ft 9 in (1.75 m)
- Position: Full-back

Youth career
- 1999–2001: Southend United

Senior career*
Years	Team	Apps	(Gls)
2002–2004	Aveley	37	(8)
2004–2010	Dagenham & Redbridge	203	(4)
2009–2010	→ Peterborough United (loan)	9	(0)
2010–2013	Peterborough United	11	(0)
2010–2011	→ Chesterfield (loan)	29	(0)
2011	→ Crawley Town (loan)	6	(0)
2011–2012	→ Chesterfield (loan)	3	(0)
2012	→ Rotherham United (loan)	8	(0)
2012	→ Plymouth Argyle (loan)	4	(0)
2013–2016	Luton Town	105	(3)
2016	→ Woking (loan)	3	(0)

International career
2006–2007	England C	2	(0)
- * Club domestic league appearances and goals as of 23:19, 23 February 2016 (UTC)

Scott Robert Griffiths (born 27 November 1985) is an English retired professional footballer who played as a full-back.

He played in the Football League for Dagenham & Redbridge, Peterborough United, Chesterfield, Crawley Town, Rotherham United, Plymouth Argyle and Luton Town. Griffiths has won three titles in his career; the Conference Premier with both Dagenham and Luton, and League Two with Chesterfield. He has been capped twice by the England C team.

== Club career ==
=== Early career ===
Born in Westminster, Greater London, Griffiths started his career playing for Basildon-based team Beech United in 1998, before signing for Southend United's youth system in 1999. He left in 2001 and joined the football academy at Thurrock and Basildon College, where he played for one year. Whilst playing for the academy team, they won their league and two cup competitions. He was also capped for Essex county football team, and missed out on a place in the England Under-19 team when he was injured before the final trial.

After college, aged 17, he signed for Isthmian League Division One North club Aveley.

=== Dagenham & Redbridge ===
On 11 August 2004, Griffiths signed for Conference National club Dagenham & Redbridge on a three-year contract. He made his debut as a 90th-minute substitute in a 4–1 away win over Forest Green Rovers on 17 August 2004. He was played at left back, and went on to make 18 league appearances in 2004–05.

In 2006–07, Dagenham & Redbridge gained promotion to League Two as Conference champions, with Griffiths playing in 45 of the club's 46 league matches. He continued to feature regularly following Dagenham's promotion, playing in 41 and 44 league matches during 2007–08 and 2008–09 respectively. He made 15 appearances for Dagenham during 2009–10, before signing on loan for Championship club Peterborough United on 23 October 2009, with a view to a permanent move.

=== Peterborough United ===
Griffiths signed a permanent three-and-a-half-year deal with Peterborough United on 22 January 2010. He played in 20 league matches, as Peterborough were relegated to League One at the end of the season.

Griffiths was not seen to have future in the squad by new manager Gary Johnson, who loaned him to Chesterfield at the beginning of 2010–11, on an initial month-long loan deal. He later had his loan extended for a further two months until 6 November 2010. After making 19 appearances for the club, Griffiths rejoined Chesterfield until the end of the season. Griffiths made a total of 33 appearances for Chesterfield during the season, helping them to win the League Two title.

Griffiths' next two seasons were characterised by short-term loan deals, as he failed to make another appearance for Peterborough. He joined League Two club Crawley Town on a one-month loan in September 2011, making six appearances. Griffiths returned to Chesterfield on 25 November 2011, signing a loan deal until 2 January 2012, playing in four matches. He then joined League Two club Rotherham United on loan on 10 January 2012 for the remainder of 2011–12, making eight appearances.

He featured in a behind closed doors game for Forest Green Rovers in September 2012 against AFC Bournemouth, and later joined Plymouth Argyle in League Two on loan for one month.

Having returned to Peterborough in November 2012, Griffiths left the club at the end of January 2013 after his contract was cancelled six months early by mutual consent.

=== Luton Town ===
Griffiths signed for Conference Premier club Luton Town on 25 March 2013, linking back up with his former Dagenham & Redbridge manager John Still. He signed a short-term contract until the end of 2012–13. After impressing in the six matches he played for the club, Luton tied Griffiths to a one-year contract extension. He played in every league game of Luton's successful 2013–14 season as the club were crowned Conference Premier champions, with Griffiths a part of the defence that kept a club-record 23 clean sheets. Griffiths played enough matches throughout the season to trigger an extension clause in his contract, keeping him at Luton until June 2015.

He played in 35 league matches throughout 2014–15, earning a further year's extension to his contract in the process.

Griffiths made 24 appearances in all competitions under the management of John Still and caretaker manager Andy Awford in 2015–16, before the appointment of Nathan Jones as the new Luton manager on 6 January 2016.

On 30 January 2016, Griffiths joined National League club Woking on a 28-day loan. On the same day, Griffiths made his Woking debut in a 2–2 draw with Barrow, in which he scored an own goal to give Barrow a 1–0 lead. He made four appearances for the club in all competitions.

On 10 May 2016, it was announced that Griffiths would not have his contract renewed. He left the club upon the expiry of his contract.

== International career ==
Griffiths' performances for Dagenham & Redbridge led to him being called up by the England National Game XI team. He played against the Netherlands in the last of England's 2005–06 European Challenge Trophy group matches on 29 November 2006, which saw them finish top of their group with maximum points. He also played in the 3–1 away defeat to Northern Ireland on 14 February 2007.

== Career statistics ==
As of match played 23 February 2016

Appearances and goals by club, season and competition
Club	Season	League			FA Cup		League Cup		Other		Total	
Club	Season	Division	Apps	Goals	Apps	Goals	Apps	Goals	Apps	Goals	Apps	Goals
Dagenham & Redbridge	2004–05	Conference National	18	0	0	0	—		2 (Note: One appearance in Football League Trophy, one in FA Trophy)	0	20	0
Dagenham & Redbridge	2005–06	Conference National	42	3	1	0	—		6 (Note: One appearance in Football League Trophy, five in FA Trophy)	0	49	3
Dagenham & Redbridge	2006–07	Conference National	45	0	1	0	—		2 (Note: Appearance(s) in FA Trophy)	0	48	0
Dagenham & Redbridge	2007–08	League Two	41	0	3	0	1	0	3 (Note: Appearance(s) in Football League Trophy)	0	48	0
Dagenham & Redbridge	2008–09	League Two	44	0	3	0	1	0	3	0	51	0
Dagenham & Redbridge	2009–10	League Two	13	1	0	0	1	0	1	0	15	1
Dagenham & Redbridge	Total		203	4	8	0	3	0	17	0	231	4
Peterborough United	2009–10	Championship	20	0	1	0	0	0	0	0	21	0
Chesterfield (loan)	2010–11	League Two	29	0	1	0	1	0	2	0	33	0
Crawley Town (loan)	2011–12	League Two	6	0	0	0	0	0	0	0	6	0
Chesterfield (loan)	2011–12	League One	3	0	0	0	0	0	1	0	4	0
Rotherham United (loan)	2011–12	League Two	8	0	0	0	0	0	0	0	8	0
Plymouth Argyle (loan)	2012–13	League Two	4	0	1	0	0	0	1	0	6	0
Luton Town	2012–13	Conference Premier	6	0	—		—		—		6	0
Luton Town	2013–14	Conference Premier	46	1	0	0	—		0	0	46	1
Luton Town	2014–15	League Two	35	2	2	0	1	0	1	0	39	2
Luton Town	2015–16	League Two	18	0	2	0	2	0	2	0	24	0
Luton Town	Total		105	3	4	0	3	0	3	0	115	3
Woking (loan)	2015–16	National League	3	0	—		—		1	0	4	0
Career total			381	7	15	0	7	0	25	0	428	7

== Honours ==
Dagenham & Redbridge

- Conference National: 2006–07

Chesterfield

- Football League Two: 2010–11

Luton Town

- Conference Premier: 2013–14
