= Magnus Okuonghae =

Footballer (born 1986)

Personal information
- Full name: Magnus Erharuyi Okuonghae
- Date of birth: 16 February 1986 (age 40)
- Place of birth: Lagos, Nigeria
- Height: 6 ft 3 in (1.91 m)
- Position: Defender

Youth career
- –2002: Fulham
- 2002–2003: Rushden & Diamonds

Senior career*
Years	Team	Apps	(Gls)
2003–2006	Rushden & Diamonds	22	(1)
2004–2005	→ Bishop's Stortford (loan)	7	(0)
2006	Aldershot Town	2	(0)
2006–2007	St Albans City	19	(0)
2007	Crawley Town	21	(2)
2007–2009	Dagenham & Redbridge	55	(2)
2008	→ Weymouth (loan)	5	(0)
2009–2015	Colchester United	196	(8)
2015–2016	Luton Town	11	(0)
2015	→ Hartlepool United (loan)	4	(0)
2016–2017	Dagenham & Redbridge	3	(0)
2017–2018	Maidstone United	28	(1)
2018	→ Welling United (loan)	10	(0)
2018–2019	Dulwich Hamlet	27	(1)
2019	Welling United	0	(0)
Total		410	(15)

International career
2006	England C	1	(0)
- * Club domestic league appearances and goals as of 19:53, 11 July 2019 (UTC)

Magnus Erharuyi Okuonghae (born 16 February 1986) is a former professional footballer who played as a defender.

Okuonghae made over 200 appearances in all competitions for Colchester United where he was club captain, and has also played for Rushden & Diamonds, Aldershot Town, St Albans City, Crawley Town, Dagenham & Redbridge, Luton Town and Maidstone United. He has made loan appearances for Bishop's Stortford, Weymouth, Hartlepool United and Welling United. Born in Nigeria, he was capped once by the England national C team in 2006.

== Club career ==
=== Early career ===
Born in Lagos, Nigeria, Okuonghae began his career with Fulham in the club's youth system, before appearing for Norwich City under-19s in March 2002, and later featured on the bench for Leicester City under-19s in April 2002.

=== Rushden & Diamonds ===
Okuonghae was signed by Third Division club Rushden & Diamonds and became part of the under-16 squad. He later signed his first professional contract with the club and was given squad number 40. During the 2002–03 season, Okuonghae failed to make an appearance for the first team, but was an unused substitute during a 4–1 win at home to Cambridge United on 18 January 2003. He made his professional debut for Rushden & Diamonds, now in the Second Division in 2003–04 as an 87th-minute substitute in a 4–0 win over Colchester United at Nene Park on 22 November, but did not feature again for the rest of the season.

A spell on loan at Conference South club Bishop's Stortford followed in 2004–05, where he made eight appearances. Okuonghae found himself playing in the first team more regularly during the 2005–06 season, making a late substitute appearance in a 1–0 victory away to Mansfield Town on 9 August 2005. He would make a further 22 appearances in all competitions throughout the season, and registered his first professional goal in a 2–1 defeat away to Rochdale on 1 October. However, the season ended in relegation for Rushden, and Okuonghae rejected their offer of a new contract and left the club.

=== Aldershot Town ===
Following an unsuccessful trial at Gillingham, Okuonghae joined Conference National club Aldershot Town in August 2006. He made his club debut on 15 August in a 1–0 defeat away to Weymouth. His second and final appearance for the club came just four days later as Aldershot beat St Albans City 5–3 on the road.

=== St Albans City ===
In late August 2006, after just two appearances for Aldershot, Okuonghae joined St Albans City on a non-contract basis. He made his debut for the club in a 2–1 defeat away to Oxford United on 1 September. Okuonghae made 20 appearances in all competitions between September 2006 and January 2007.

=== Crawley Town ===
Okuonghae moved on from St Albans in January 2007, representing his third Conference club of the season as he signed for Crawley Town. He made his debut for the club on 13 January as they defeated his former club Aldershot 2–0 at the Recreation Ground. Okuonghae scored his first of two goals for the club in a 2–2 draw against his previous club St Albans on 10 February, netting the opening goal after 12 minutes. His second and final goal came in Crawley's 2–1 defeat to Northwich Victoria on 14 April. Okuonghae ended his stint with the club with 21 appearances to his name.

=== Dagenham & Redbridge ===
Okuonghae signed for League Two club Dagenham & Redbridge on 31 May 2007. After making his debut on 1 September in a 1–0 win at home to Lincoln City, Okuonghae found his chances limited, making just 10 appearances between September 2007 and January 2008.

Okuonghae was sent out on loan to Conference Premier club Weymouth in February 2008, making his debut in a 1–0 defeat at home to Histon on 23 February. He made six appearances for Weymouth in all competitions.

Okuonghae returned to Dagenham for the 2008–09 season and started every match in the early stages of the season, winning a regular spot in the right-back position. He said he was "happy to be playing and happy to be an influence". He scored his first goal for the club during the campaign in a 2–1 defeat away to Luton Town on 15 November 2008. He also scored against Notts County in a 6–1 rout on 22 November, making the score 5–0 after 56 minutes. He played all but one league match for Dagenham & Redbridge through the campaign as they fell just short of the League Two play-offs. He was named as the club's 2008–09 Player of the Year.

=== Colchester United ===
==== 2009–10 season ====
With Okuonghae out of contract, he decided to join League One club Colchester United in July 2009. Although Dagenham & Redbridge had offered Okuonghae a new contract, he described his move to Colchester as a "no-brainer" and felt that he could make the step up to League One football. He signed a two-year deal with the club, although compensation had to be paid to Dagenham & Redbridge for the transfer. The fee for Okuonghae was set at a tribunal in August 2009, with the Professional Football Compensation Committee deciding that Colchester United should pay Dagenham & Redbridge an initial fee of £45,000, with an additional £5,000 paid after the player had made 15, 30, 45 and 60 appearances; a total further payment of £20,000. Other stipulations included a £15,000 payment if Colchester were promoted within the next two seasons if Okuonghae remained with the club, and a 20% sell-on fee would be paid on any profit if Colchester United were to sell Okuonghae.

Okuonghae made his debut for Colchester on the opening day of 2009–10 in a 7–1 win away to newly relegated Norwich City. Having played every match for the club since his transfer, he captained the team following Pat Baldwin's injury in September 2009, and was rewarded with a new contract in December 2009 to keep him at the Community Stadium until 2012. Okuonghae finished the season with 49 appearances in all competitions.

==== 2010–11 season ====
For his second season with the club, Okuonghae remained a regular starter, appearing in Colchester's longest unbeaten run from the beginning of a season with 10 matches played. He scored his first goal for the club on 25 September 2010 and Colchester's third in a 3–1 win at home to Tranmere Rovers. Soon after, he scored his second goal for the club in a 1–1 draw away to Milton Keynes Dons on 2 October. Until November, Okuonghae had made 17 first-team appearances in 2010–11, however, an ankle injury kept him out of action for the rest of the year, with Okuonghae unsure of when he would be able to return to action. He then had to undergo ankle surgery in February 2011, ruling him out for the remainder of the season.

==== 2011–12 season ====
Okuonghae returned to the first team on the opening day of 2011–12 in a 4–2 win away at Preston North End. He received his first red card for Colchester on 15 October when he was sent off in their 2–2 draw away to Rochdale. Okuonghae had another solid season, making 45 appearances in all competitions. In the latter part of the season, Okuonghae struck up a good relationship in the centre of defence with Tom Eastman, at one stage conceding just two goals in six matches. With his contract expiring in the summer, Okuonghae said that rumours linking him with a move away from the club "helps me to raise my game" and gives him the confidence to improve his performances.

During a summer of uncertainty for Okuonghae, it was reported that a number of Championship clubs were keen on capturing his signature, including Blackburn Rovers, Bolton Wanderers, Burnley, Charlton Athletic, Derby County, Millwall, Sheffield Wednesday and Scottish Premier League club Celtic, having also been offered a new contract by Colchester. He decided to leave Colchester after three years with the club on 3 July 2012 with the hope of securing a move to a Championship club. However, Okuonghae returned to Colchester on 14 July and signed a new three-year deal.

==== 2012–13 season ====
In a season where Colchester battled against the threat of relegation to League Two, Okuonghae made 46 appearances and scored three goals in all competitions, converting Anthony Wordsworth's corner kick in a 2–2 draw at home to Portsmouth on 21 August 2012, followed by Colchester's only goal in a 2–1 defeat at home to Doncaster Rovers on 15 September, and a consolation goal in a 5–1 defeat at home to Tranmere Rovers on 23 February 2013.

==== 2013–14 season ====
Following a solid start to 2013–14, Okuonghae was nominated for the League One Player of the Month award for August, having been an ever-present member of the Colchester defence that conceded just four goals in five matches. In a 4–1 defeat by his former club Dagenham & Redbridge in the Football League Trophy on 3 September, Okuonghae received his second red card of his Colchester United career. He scored two goals during the course of the season; the opening goal in a 3–1 defeat away to Brentford on 19 October, and once again in another defeat, this time at the hands of Swindon Town on 16 November. He went on to make 46 appearances for the club throughout the season.

==== 2014–15 season ====
Ahead of 2014–15, Okuonghae was announced as the club's new captain following Brian Wilson's decision to leave the club over the summer. His vice captain was named as new-boy Sean Clohessy on 7 August 2014. Okuonghae scored the opening goal in Colchester's first match of the season, a 2–2 draw at home to Oldham Athletic. He received a red card in only his second match of the season, a 4–0 League Cup defeat to Charlton Athletic on 12 August. He then received his second red card of the campaign a little over one month later when he was shown a straight red for fouling former teammate Dave Mooney in a match against Leyton Orient. He committed the foul just before half-time in what ended a 2–0 victory for Colchester on 13 September, their first win of the season.

After missing a number of matches through suspension and the ensuing form of his replacement Frankie Kent, Okuonghae returned to action when he replaced Kent after only five minutes following a head injury he received after being struck by the ball on 21 October in a 2–1 victory at home to Chesterfield. In Colchester's 1–0 defeat at home to Coventry City on 22 November, Okuonghae suffered an achilles tendon rupture and had to be stretchered off the field late in the match. This ruled him out of action for the rest of the season.

With his contract expiring in the summer of 2015, Colchester United took the decision not to renew Okhuonghae's contract, ending his six-year association with the club. Manager Tony Humes described Okuonghae as "an excellent servant to the club". Okuonghae departed Colchester having made 215 appearances in all competitions during his time at the club.

=== Luton Town ===
Okuonghae signed a two-year contract with League Two club Luton Town on 1 July 2015, once again teaming-up with John Still, who was manager of Dagenham & Redbridge during Okuonghae's time at the club. He made his debut for the club as a 59th-minute substitute for Scott Cuthbert in a 2–1 win at home to Leyton Orient in the Football League Trophy on 1 September. After making his first start for Luton in a 2–1 defeat away to Gillingham in the Football League Trophy, Okuonghae joined League Two rivals Hartlepool United on a one-month loan on 17 October. He sustained an ankle injury during a 2–0 defeat away to AFC Wimbledon on 31 October and returned to Luton for treatment. Okuonghae did not play for Hartlepool again during his loan spell, having made four appearances. He returned to first-team football for Luton to make his second starting appearance in a 2–0 defeat away to Peterborough United in the FA Cup on 6 December. Okuonghae required knee surgery in April 2016 and did not feature again in 2015–16, having made 14 appearances in all competitions. He was placed on the transfer list at the end of the season, before his contract was cancelled by mutual consent on 31 August.

=== Return to Dagenham & Redbridge ===
Okuonghae re-signed for National League club Dagenham & Redbridge on a short-term contract until 2 January 2017 on 25 November 2016. He made his second debut a day later in a 4–1 defeat at home to Barrow. Okuonghae was released following the expiration of his contract, having made four appearances for the club.

=== Maidstone United ===
On 20 February 2017, Okuonghae signed for National League club Maidstone United on a contract until the end of 2016–17. He debuted on 14 April 2017 in a 3–1 victory away to Wrexham and finished the season with five appearances. Okuonghae signed a new one-year contract with the club on 1 June 2017.

He joined National League South club Welling United on 9 March 2018 on loan until the end of 2017–18. Okuonghae made his debut a day later, starting in a 1–0 away victory over East Thurrock United, before finishing the loan with 10 appearances. He was released by Maidstone at the end of the season.

=== Dulwich Hamlet ===
Okuonghae signed for National League South club Dulwich Hamlet on 23 July 2018.

=== Return to Welling United ===
On 26 June 2019, Welling United announced that Okuonghae had returned to the club, this time on permanent basis. However, one month later, on 25 July 2019, the club announced that Okuonghae had decided to retire from football with immediate effect.

== International career ==
While playing for St Albans City, Okuonghae was selected for the semi-professional England National Game XI. He played in a friendly against Forest Green Rovers on 5 September 2006 to mark the official opening of their New Lawn stadium. England National Game XI lost the fixture 1–0, with Okuonghae scoring an own goal.

== Personal life ==
After retiring from football, Okuonghae began working as a HR and Recruitment Consultant for Annapurna Recruitment.

== Career statistics ==
Appearances and goals by club, season and competition
Club	Season	League			FA Cup		League Cup		Other		Total	
Club	Season	Division	Apps	Goals	Apps	Goals	Apps	Goals	Apps	Goals	Apps	Goals
Rushden & Diamonds	2002–03	Third Division	0	0	0	0	0	0	0	0	0	0
Rushden & Diamonds	2003–04	Second Division	1	0	0	0	0	0	0	0	1	0
Rushden & Diamonds	2004–05	League Two	0	0	0	0	0	0	1 (Note: Appearance in NFA Maunsell Cup)	0	1	0
Rushden & Diamonds	2005–06	League Two	21	1	0	0	1	0	3 (Note: One appearance in Football League Trophy, two in NFA Maunsell Cup)	0	25	1
Rushden & Diamonds	Total		22	1	0	0	1	0	4	0	27	1
Bishop's Stortford (loan)	2004–05	Conference South	7	0	—		—		1 (Note: Appearance(s) in FA Trophy)	0	8	0
Aldershot Town	2006–07	Conference National	2	0	—		—		—		2	0
St Albans City	2006–07	Conference National	19	0	0	0	—		1	0	20	0
Crawley Town	2006–07	Conference National	21	2	—		—		—		21	2
Dagenham & Redbridge	2007–08	League Two	10	0	0	0	0	0	1 (Note: Appearance(s) in Football League Trophy)	0	11	0
Dagenham & Redbridge	2008–09	League Two	45	2	3	0	1	0	3	0	52	2
Dagenham & Redbridge	Total		55	2	3	0	1	0	4	0	63	2
Weymouth (loan)	2007–08	Conference Premier	5	0	—		—		1 (Note: Appearance in Conference League Cup)	0	6	0
Colchester United	2009–10	League One	44	0	3	0	1	0	1	0	49	0
Colchester United	2010–11	League One	14	2	0	0	2	0	1	0	17	2
Colchester United	2011–12	League One	42	0	2	0	1	0	0	0	45	0
Colchester United	2012–13	League One	43	3	1	0	1	0	1	0	46	3
Colchester United	2013–14	League One	44	2	1	0	1	0	1	0	47	2
Colchester United	2014–15	League One	9	1	1	0	1	0	0	0	11	1
Colchester United	Total		196	8	8	0	7	0	4	0	215	8
Luton Town	2015–16	League Two	11	0	1	0	0	0	2	0	14	0
Hartlepool United (loan)	2015–16	League Two	4	0	—		—		—		4	0
Dagenham & Redbridge	2016–17	National League	3	0	—		—		1	0	4	0
Maidstone United	2016–17	National League	5	0	—		—		—		5	0
Maidstone United	2017–18	National League	23	1	2	1	—		3	1	28	3
Maidstone United	Total		28	1	2	1	—		3	1	33	3
Welling United (loan)	2017–18	National League South	10	0	—		—		—		10	0
Dulwich Hamlet	2018–19	National League South	27	1	1	0	—		2	0	30	1
Career total			410	15	15	1	9	0	23	1	457	17

== Honours ==
Individual

- Dagenham & Redbridge Player of the Year: 2008–09
