= Sam Sloma =

English footballer (born 1982)

Personal information
- Full name: Samuel Mark Sloma
- Date of birth: 29 October 1982 (age 44)
- Place of birth: Enfield, England
- Height: 5 ft 7 in (1.70 m)
- Positions: Defender; midfielder

Youth career
- Wimbledon

Senior career*
Years	Team	Apps	(Gls)
–2002	Wimbledon	0	(0)
2001–2002	→ Hampton & Richmond (loan)	8	(0)
2002	Aylesbury United	18	(0)
2002–2006	Wingate & Finchley	139	(34)
	Milwaukee Wave United	?	(?)
2006	Wealdstone	1	(0)
2006	Thurrock	13	(3)
2006–2008	Dagenham & Redbridge	72	(10)
2008–2009	Grays Athletic	21	(3)
2009	Chelmsford City	9	(2)
2009–2010	Woking	25	(2)
2010–2011	Wingate & Finchley		
2011–201?	London Lions		

International career
2009	Britain (Maccabiah)		
- * Club domestic league appearances and goals as of 20:52, 19 May 2009 (UTC)

Sam Sloma
Medal record

Representing Great Britain

Football

Maccabiah Games
Silver medal – second place	2009 Maccabiah	Football

Samuel Mark Sloma (born 29 October 1982) is an English former footballer, who played defender/midfielder. His teams included Woking, Wimbledon, and Dagenham & Redbridge. He played for the Great Britain football team at the 2009 Maccabiah Games in Israel, winning a silver medal.

== Early life ==
He was born in Enfield, England, and is Jewish. He left school at 16 years of age to pursue a professional football career.

== Football career ==
Sloma started out as a trainee with Wimbledon, where he captained their youth side, before being loaned out to Hampton & Richmond Borough. In 2002 he then signed for Aylesbury United, making a total of 18 appearances, before moving on to Wingate & Finchley, with whom he played 167 times up until 2006.

Sloma also played in the United States in 2004 for Milwaukee Wave United in the A-League.

He played for the Great Britain football team at the 2005 Maccabiah Games in Israel, and at the 2009 Maccabiah Games, winning a silver medal.

In February 2006, Sloma joined Isthmian Premier club Wealdstone, before joining Thurrock in the Conference South in April 2006 on dual registration with the "Stones".

Sloma signed for Dagenham & Redbridge in June 2006. He played two seasons for Dagenham & Redbridge, helping them to achieve Football League status for the first time in their history, scoring their first-ever Football League goal. However, he was released at the end of the 2007–08 season alongside Dave Rainford.

In June 2008, Grays Athletic announced Sloma had signed for the Conference National outfit. He scored on his début for the club in a 2–1 home victory over Northwich Victoria in the Conference National, with a 35-yard long-range shot. On 18 November 2008, Sloma scored a goal to put Grays Athletic 1–0 in the lead against Carlisle United in an FA Cup first round clash, only for it to be cancelled due to floodlight failure. The match was replayed on 29 November and Grays lost 2–0.

On 19 January 2009, Sloma was placed on the transfer list by Grays following discussions with the club in which Sloma stated he would not be staying at the club for the 2009–10 season. His contract at Grays was terminated by mutual consent nine days later.

In February 2009, Sloma joined Chelmsford City in the Conference South, teaming up with former Dagenham & Redbridge teammates, Dave Rainford and Chris Moore. On 6 May 2009, Sloma was released from his contract with Chelmsford City.

Sloma joined newly relegated Woking in the Conference South on a one-year contract in June 2009, but was released a year later following an unsuccessful time.

In 2010 he re-signed with former club Wingate & Finchley.

For the 2011–12 season he signed for London Lions.

=== Honours ===
- Conference National: 2006–07

== After football ==
In 2017, he became a Chartered Financial Planner and started a new financial planning firm, Engage Financial Services.
