= 2009–10 Dagenham & Redbridge F.C. season =

Dagenham & Redbridge
2009–10 season
- Chairman: David Andrews
- Manager: John Still
- Stadium: Victoria Road
- Football League Two: 7th
- FA Cup: First round
- Football League Cup: First round
- Football League Trophy: First round
- Top goalscorer: League: Paul Benson (17); All: Paul Benson (22)
- Highest home attendance: 4,566 (v Morecambe, League Two play-offs, 16 May 2010)
- Lowest home attendance: 1,683 (v Shrewsbury Town, League Two, 18 August 2009)
- Average home league attendance: 2,098

The 2009–10 season was the 3rd season in the Football League played by Dagenham & Redbridge F.C., an English football club based in Dagenham, Greater London. It was their third consecutive season in Football League Two after promotion from Football Conference in 2007. The season covers the period from 1 July 2009 to 30 June 2010.

== Match results ==
League positions are sourced from Statto, while the remaining contents of each table are sourced from the references in the "Ref" column.

=== League table ===
Pos	Team	Pld	W	D	L	GF	GA	GD	Pts	Promotion, qualification or relegation
5	Rotherham United	46	21	10	15	55	52	+3	73	Qualification to League Two play-offs
6	Aldershot Town	46	20	12	14	69	56	+13	72	Qualification to League Two play-offs
7	Dagenham & Redbridge (O, P)	46	20	12	14	69	58	+11	72	Qualification to League Two play-offs
8	Chesterfield	46	21	7	18	61	62	−1	70	
9	Bury	46	19	12	15	54	59	−5	69	

Updated to match(es) played on unknown. Source: football-league.co.uk
(O) Play-off winners; (P) Promoted

=== League Two ===
Date	League position	Opponents	Venue	Result	Score F–A	Scorers	Attendance	Ref
8 August 2009	6th	Crewe Alexandra	A	W	2–1	Nurse 43', Benson 74'	3,936	
15 August 2009	3rd	Torquay United	H	W	5–3	Gain 18', Green (2) 55', 56', Scott 66', Thomas 90'	1,824	
18 August 2009	1st	Shrewsbury Town	H	W	5–0	Benson (4) 20', 26' 39', 70', Griffiths 37'	1,683	
22 August 2009	2nd	Notts County	A	L	0–3		6,561	
29 August 2009	1st	Lincoln City	H	W	3–0	Nurse (2) 13', 72', Green 57'	1,810	
5 September 2009	3rd	Cheltenham Town	A	D	1–1	Benson 49'	2,969	
12 September 2009	2nd	Chesterfield	H	W	2–1	Antwi 25', Benson 48'	2,034	
19 September 2009	2nd	Burton Albion	A	W	1–0	Benson 4'	2,689	
26 September 2009	2nd	Morecambe	H	D	1–1	Scott 37'	1,770	
29 September 2009	3rd	Barnet	A	L	0–2		2,093	
3 October 2009	3rd	Hereford United	A	D	1–1	Thomas 83'	2,253	
10 October 2009	2nd	Darlington	H	W	2–0	Green 17', Scott 18'	1,981	
17 October 2009	2nd	Bradford City	H	W	2–1	Benson 8', Ogogo 72'	2,446	
24 October 2009	2nd	Macclesfield Town	A	D	2–2	Thomas 79', Arber 90' pen.	1,574	
31 October 2009	3rd	Port Vale	H	D	1–1	Scott 88'	2,003	
14 November 2009	1st	Accrington Stanley	A	W	1–0	Arber 39'	1,538	
21 November 2009	3rd	Rochdale	H	L	1–2	Gain 3'	2,235	
24 November 2009	4th	Bournemouth	A	D	0–0		6,881	
1 December 2009	4th	Aldershot Town	H	L	2–5	Arber 40' pen., Ofori-Twumasi 53'	1,876	
5 December 2009	5th	Grimsby Town	A	D	1–1	Nurse 60'	3,090	
12 December 2009	4th	Bury	H	W	3–1	Benson (2) 18', 79', Ofori-Twumasi 90'	1,915	
26 December 2009	4th	Northampton Town	A	L	0–1		4,108	
28 December 2009	5th	Cheltenham Town	H	L	0–2		2,028	
16 January 2010	3rd	Crewe Alexandra	H	W	2–0	Scott 35', Green 41'	1,951	
23 January 2010	7th	Shrewsbury Town	A	L	1–2	Benson 6'	4,812	
26 January 2010	8th	Notts County	H	L	0–3		1,916	
6 February 2010	10th	Northampton Town	H	L	0–1		2,206	
9 February 2010	12th	Rotherham United	A	L	0–2		2,604	
13 February 2010	10th	Bournemouth	H	W	1–0	Arber 39' pen.	2,215	
20 February 2010	13th	Rochdale	A	L	1–3	Scott 10'	3,153	
23 February 2010	9th	Aldershot Town	A	W	3–2	Benson (2) 66', 72', Scott 85'	2,053	
27 February 2010	9th	Grimsby Town	H	W	2–0	Scott 49', Green 86'	2,190	
2 March 2010	9th	Torquay United	A	D	0–0		2,140	
6 March 2010	10th	Bury	A	D	0–0		2,886	
13 March 2010	11th	Rotherham United	H	L	0–1		1,862	
16 March 2010	12th	Lincoln City	A	D	1–1	Nurse 33'	2,457	
20 March 2010	8th	Macclesfield Town	H	W	3–1	Green (2) 51', 87', Ogogo 71'	3,721	
27 March 2010	9th	Bradford City	A	D	3–3	Nurse 69', Williams 75' o.g., Oliver 90' o.g.	11,064	
3 April 2010	9th	Accrington Stanley	H	W	3–1	Benson 7', Gain 41', Green 53'	2,031	
5 April 2010	11th	Port Vale	A	L	1–3	Pack 15'	4,572	
10 April 2010	11th	Chesterfield	A	D	2–2	Green (2) 24', 50' pen.	3,588	
13 April 2010	11th	Barnet	H	W	4–1	Green (2) 5', 67', Benson 80', Scott 82'	2,004	
17 April 2010	7th	Burton Albion	H	W	2–1	Vincelot 52', Montgomery 90'	1,891	
24 April 2010	11th	Morecambe	A	L	0–1		2,100	
1 May 2010	7th	Hereford United	H	W	2–1	Benson 35', Montgomery 90'	2,663	
8 May 2010	7th	Darlington	A	W	2–0	Nurse 31', Scott 75'	2,720	

=== Football League Two play-offs ===
Round	Date	Opponents	Venue	Result	Score F–A	Scorers	Attendance	Ref
Semi final first leg	16 May 2010	Morecambe	H	W	6–0	Benson (2) 4', 66', Scott (4) 35', 48', 54', 69'	4,566	
Semi final second leg	20 May 2010	Morecambe	A	L	1–2	Benson 85'	4,972	
Final	30 May 2010	Rotherham United	N	W	3–2	Benson 39', Green 56', Nurse 70'	32,054	

=== FA Cup ===
Round	Date	Opponents	Venue	Result	Score F–A	Scorers	Attendance	Ref
First round	6 November 2009	Huddersfield Town	A	L	1–6	Benson 74'	5,858	

=== League Cup ===
Round	Date	Opponents	Venue	Result	Score F–A	Scorers	Attendance	Ref
First round	11 August 2009	Cardiff City	A	L	1–3	Scott 81'	5,545	

=== Football League Trophy ===
Round	Date	Opponents	Venue	Result	Score F–A	Scorers	Attendance	Ref
First round	1 September 2009	Milton Keynes Dons	A	L	1–3	Scott 90+3'	4,413	

== Player details ==
As of 15 February 2013.

Numbers in parentheses denote appearances as substitute.
Players with names struck through and marked † left the club during the playing season.
Players with names in italics and marked * were on loan from another club for the whole of their season with Dagenham & Redbridge.
Players listed with no appearances have been in the matchday squad but only as unused substitutes.
Key to positions: GK – Goalkeeper; DF – Defender; MF – Midfielder; FW – Forward

No.	Pos.	Nat.	Name	League		FA Cup		League Cup		FL Trophy		Play-offs		Total		Discipline	
No.	Pos.	Nat.	Name	Apps	Goals	Apps	Goals	Apps	Goals	Apps	Goals	Apps	Goals	Apps	Goals	A yellow rectangle, denoting the yellow penalty card shown to a player being cautioned	A red rectangle, denoting the red penalty card shown to a player being sent off
1	GK	WAL	Tony Roberts	46	0	1	0	1	0	1	0	3	0	52	0	2	0
2	DF	ENG	Alex Bentley	0	0	0	0	0	0	0	0	0	0	0	0	0	0
3	DF	ENG	~~Seth Ofori-Twumasi *~~ †	8	2	0	0	0	0	0	0	0	0	8	2	1	0
3	DF	IRL	Damien McCrory	20	0	0	0	0	0	0	0	3	0	23	0	3	0
4	DF	ENG	Scott Doe	40 (2)	0	1	0	1	0	0	0	3	0	45 (2)	0	6	1
5	MF	NGA	~~Solomon Taiwo~~ †	4	0	0	0	1	0	0	0	0	0	5	0	0	0
5	MF	TOG	~~Yoann Folly *~~ †	5 (2)	0	0	0	0	0	0	0	0	0	5 (2)	0	0	0
6	DF	ENG	Mark Arber	41	4	1	0	1	0	1	0	3	0	47	4	7	0
7	MF	ENG	Danny Green	45 (1)	13	1	0	1	0	0 (1)	0	3	1	50 (2)	14	8	0
8	MF	ENG	Stuart Thurgood	17	0	1	0	1	0	0	0	0	0	19	0	2	0
9	FW	BRB	Jon Nurse	30 (8)	7	1	0	0	0	1	0	3	1	35 (8)	8	2	0
10	FW	ENG	Josh Scott	36 (4)	10	1	0	0 (1)	1	0 (1)	1	3	4	40 (6)	16	2	0
11	FW	ENG	Mark Nwokeji	0	0	0	0	0	0	0	0	0	0	0	0	0	0
12	DF	ENG	~~Scott Griffiths~~ †	13	1	0	0	1	0	1	0	0	0	15	1	1	0
14	FW	ENG	Paul Benson	45	17	1	1	1	0	1	0	3	4	51	22	5	0
15	DF	ENG	Anwar Uddin	3 (3)	0	0	0	0	0	0	0	0 (1)	0	3 (4)	0	0	0
16	FW	ENG	Wes Thomas	3 (20)	3	0 (1)	0	1	0	1	0	0	0	5 (21)	3	1	1
17	MF	ENG	Darren Currie	5 (11)	0	0	0	0	0	0	0	0	0	5 (11)	0	0	0
18	MF	ENG	Stephen Demetriou	0	0	0	0	0	0	0	0	0	0	0	0	0	0
19	DF	ENG	Abu Ogogo	27 (3)	2	0	0	0 (1)	0	1	0	3	0	31 (4)	2	6	1
20	MF	ENG	~~Tom Kilbey *~~ †	0	0	0	0	0	0	1	0	0	0	1	0	0	0
20	MF	POR	~~Joao Carlos~~ †	0 (1)	0	0	0	0	0	0	0	0	0	0 (1)	0	0	0
20	DF	FRA	Romain Vincelot	7 (1)	1	0	0	0	0	0	0	3	0	10 (1)	1	4	0
21	MF	ENG	~~Will Hendry~~ †	0	0	0	0	0	0	0	0	0	0	0	0	0	0
21	DF	ENG	~~Matt Lockwood *~~ †	4	0	0	0	0	0	0	0	0	0	4	0	0	0
21	DF	ENG	Gavyn Dayes	0	0	0	0	0	0	0	0	0	0	0	0	0	0
22	MF	ENG	Graeme Montgomery	14 (3)	2	0 (1)	0	0 (1)	0	1	0	0 (2)	0	15 (7)	2	0	0
23	MF	ENG	Danny Spiller	7 (3)	0	0	0	0	0	0	0	0	0	7 (3)	0	0	0
24	MF	ENG	Billy Bingham	0 (2)	0	0	0	0	0	0	0	0	0	0 (2)	0	0	0
25	DF	GHA	Will Antwi	19	1	1	0	1	0	1	0	0	0	22	1	0	0
26	MF	ENG	Tommy Tejan-Sie	1 (2)	0	1	0	0	0	0	0	0 (1)	0	2 (3)	0	0	0
27	GK	ENG	Dave Hogan	0	0	0	0	0	0	0	0	0	0	0	0	0	0
28	MF	ENG	~~Marlon Pack *~~ †	17	1	0	0	0	0	0	0	0	0	17	1	2	0
29	MF	ENG	~~Adam Miller *~~ †	8	0	0	0	0	0	0	0	0	0	8	0	0	0
30	GK	ENG	Chris Lewington	0	0	0	0	0	0	0	0	0	0	0	0	0	0
31	FW	ENG	Phil Walsh	0 (9)	0	0	0	0	0	0	0	0 (2)	0	0 (11)	0	0	0
32	FW	ENG	Hakeem Araba	0	0	0	0	0	0	0	0	0	0	0	0	0	0
33	MF	IRL	Peter Gain	43	3	1	0	1	0	1	0	3	0	49	3	14	0
34	MF	ENG	~~Jamie Day *~~ †	8	0	0	0	0	0	0	0	0	0	8	0	1	0
35	DF	ENG	Harlee Dean	0 (1)	0	0	0	0	0	0	0	0	0	0 (1)	0	0	0
