= Mark Arber =

English footballer (born 1977)

Personal information
- Full name: Mark Andrew Arber
- Date of birth: 9 October 1977 (age 49)
- Place of birth: Johannesburg, South Africa
- Height: 6 ft 1 in (1.85 m)
- Position: Defender

Youth career
- –1996: Tottenham Hotspur

Senior career*
Years	Team	Apps	(Gls)
1996–1998	Tottenham Hotspur	0	(0)
1998	→ Barnet (loan)	8	(0)
1998–2002	Barnet	167	(23)
2002–2004	Peterborough United	69	(5)
2004–2005	Oldham Athletic	14	(1)
2004–2005	→ Peterborough United (loan)	4	(0)
2005–2007	Peterborough United	97	(3)
2007	→ Dagenham & Redbridge (loan)	6	(0)
2007–2008	Stevenage Borough	27	(5)
2008	→ Dagenham & Redbridge (loan)	16	(1)
2008–2012	Dagenham & Redbridge	163	(11)
2012–2013	Dartford	38	(0)
2013–2014	Corby Town	2	(0)
2014	→ Huntingdon Town (loan)	14	(2)
Total		625	(51)
- * Club domestic league appearances and goals

Mark Andrew Arber (born 9 October 1977) is an English former professional footballer who played as a centre-back or left-back. He began his career in 1996 with Tottenham Hotspur, and retired in 2014 after a short stay at Corby Town. Following his retirement from playing, Arber moved into coaching, and previously served as an academy coach at Arsenal.

== Career ==
Arber began his career with Tottenham Hotspur in 1996; he made no appearances in the first team prior to him leaving in 1998, being sent out on loan to Barnet that year, where he made eight league appearances.

Following his release by Tottenham he signed for Barnet on a permanent contract and became a regular in the first-team squad, making 197 appearances and scoring 25 goals between 1998 and 2002, when he joined Peterborough United.

At Peterborough, Arber was again a regular in the side, making 75 appearances and scoring 5 goals prior to a short stint with Oldham Athletic in 2004. At Oldham, he played only 17 times, scoring one goal.

After his time at Oldham ended, Arber rejoined Peterborough and between 2005 and 2007 he made 117 appearances, scoring four goals. Near the end of his second spell at Peterborough, in 2007, he went out on loan to Dagenham & Redbridge, playing six times.

He left Peterborough once more in June 2007 and joined Stevenage Borough on a free transfer; at Stevenage, Arber made 32 appearances, scoring 5 goals.

On 12 February 2008, Arber rejoined Dagenham & Redbridge on loan until the end of the 2007–08 season. At the end of the season Arber signed for Dagenham on a permanent basis. He soon became captain of the side, leading them to a 3–2 victory over Rotherham United in the League Two play-off final in May 2010.

In May 2012, after making 163 appearances and scoring 11 goals, Arber was released by Dagenham upon the expiry of his contract. Subsequently, Arber signed for Blue Square Bet Premier newcomers Dartford in late July 2012.

Arber had a constant place in the Dartford starting line up in the beginning of the 2012–13 season. However, on 17 November 2012, he fractured his jaw in a 2–2 draw home to Southport. Uncertain of this, he continued playing, going to the lengths of making a tackle with his head. It was confirmed at East Grinstead Hospital that he would be out for three to four weeks. He was released by Dartford at the end of the season.

In June 2013, he joined Corby Town as player-coach. He also started coaching at the Arsenal academy until he placed a bet on Mesut Ozil joining Arsenal, tweeting "Lovely bit of 14–1 Mesut'" and was subsequently released. In January 2014, Arber joined United Counties League Premier Division side Huntingdon Town on loan until the end of the season. He made fourteen league appearances for the club, scoring two goals, as they finished runners-up to Spalding United.

== Personal life ==
Arber is the son of former footballer Bobby Arber.

== Career statistics ==
Appearances and goals by club, season and competition
Club	Season	League			FA Cup		League Cup		Other		Total	
Club	Season	Division	Apps	Goals	Apps	Goals	Apps	Goals	Apps	Goals	Apps	Goals
Tottenham Hotspur	1996–97	Premier League	0	0	0	0	0	0	—		0	0
Tottenham Hotspur	1997–98	Premier League	0	0	0	0	0	0	—		0	0
Tottenham Hotspur	Total		0	0	0	0	0	0	—		0	0
Barnet	1998–99	Third Division	35	2	0	0	0	0	1 (Note: Appearance(s) in Football League Trophy)	0	36	2
Barnet	1999–2000	Third Division	45	6	1	0	2	0	4 (Note: Two appearances in Football League Trophy, two appearances and one goal in Football League Third Division play-offs)	1	52	7
Barnet	2000–01	Third Division	45	7	2	0	2	0	3	0	52	7
Barnet	2001–02	Conference Premier	38	7	2	0	—		5 (Note: Four appearances and one goal in Football League Trophy, one appearance in FA Trophy)	1	45	8
Barnet	2002–03	Conference Premier	12	1	0	0	—		0	0	12	1
Barnet	Total		175	23	5	0	4	0	13	2	197	25
Peterborough United	2002–03	Third Division	25	2	—		—		—		25	2
Peterborough United	2003–04	Second Division	44	3	3	0	1	0	2	0	50	3
Peterborough United	Total		69	5	3	0	1	0	2	0	75	5
Oldham Athletic	2004–05	League One	14	1	—		2	0	1	0	17	1
Peterborough United	2004–05	League One	21	0	2	1	—		—		23	1
Peterborough United	2005–06	League Two	46	2	2	0	1	0	3	0	52	2
Peterborough United	2006–07	League Two	34	1	4	0	2	0	2	0	42	1
Peterborough United	Total		101	3	8	1	3	0	5	0	117	4
Dagenham & Redbridge	2006–07	Conference Premier	6	0	—		—		—		6	0
Stevenage Borough	2007–08	Conference Premier	27	5	3	0	—		2 (Note: One appearance in FA Trophy, one appearance in Conference League Cup)	0	32	5
Dagenham & Redbridge (loan)	2007–08	League Two	16	1	—		—		—		16	1
Dagenham & Redbridge	2008–09	League Two	42	3	3	0	1	0	0	0	46	3
Dagenham & Redbridge	2009–10	League Two	41	4	1	0	1	0	4 (Note: One appearance in Football League Trophy, three appearances in Football League Two play-offs)	0	47	4
Dagenham & Redbridge	2010–11	League One	44	2	2	0	1	0	1	0	48	2
Dagenham & Redbridge	2011–12	League Two	33	2	0	0	1	0	1	0	35	2
Dagenham & Redbridge	Total		176	12	6	0	4	0	6	0	192	12
Dartford	2012–13	Conference Premier	38	0	2	0	—		4 (Note: Appearance(s) in FA Trophy)	0	44	0
Corby Town	2013–14	Southern League Premier Division	2	0	0	0	—		1 (Note: Appearance(s) in Northamptonshire Senior Cup)	0	3	0
Career total			608	49	27	1	14	0	34	2	683	52

== Honours ==
Dagenham & Redbridge

- Football League Two play-offs: 2010
