= Danny Foster (footballer) =

English footballer

Personal information
- Full name: Daniel Foster
- Date of birth: 23 September 1984 (age 42)
- Place of birth: Enfield, England
- Height: 5 ft 10 in (1.78 m)
- Position: Right back

Youth career
- –1994: Brimsdown Rovers
- 1994–2002: Tottenham Hotspur

Senior career*
Years	Team	Apps	(Gls)
2002–2004	Tottenham Hotspur	0	(0)
2004–2009	Dagenham & Redbridge	170	(4)
2009–2010	Brentford	36	(0)
2010–2013	Wycombe Wanderers	76	(1)
Total		282	(5)

International career
2000	England U16	1	(0)
2002	England U18	2	(0)
2007	England C	3	(0)
- * Club domestic league appearances and goals

Daniel Foster (born 23 September 1984) is an English former professional footballer who played as a right back in the Football League, most notably for Dagenham & Redbridge and Wycombe Wanderers. He was capped by England at youth and C level.

== Club career ==
=== Early years ===
Foster began his youth career at Brimsdown Rovers and later entered the academy at Premier League club Tottenham Hotspur, progressing to sign his first professional contract in June 2002. He failed to receive a call into a first team squad and was released at the end of the 2003–04 season.

=== Dagenham & Redbridge ===
Foster dropped into non-league football to join Conference Premier club Dagenham & Redbridge in September 2004. He made a breakthrough into the first team squad during the second half of the 2004–05 season and signed a new three-year contract in February 2005. Foster was a regular during 2005–06 season and missed just one league match during 2006–07, in which the Daggers secured promotion to the Football League after winning the Conference Premier title. He signed a new two-year contract following the promotion.

Foster continued to appear regularly for the club in League Two and made 69 league appearances and scoring three goals before being released at the end of the 2008–09 season. During five seasons at Victoria Road, Foster made 186 appearances and scored four goals.

=== Brentford ===
On 17 June 2009, Foster and former Dagenham & Redbridge teammates Sam Saunders and Ben Strevens joined newly promoted League One club Brentford on free transfers, with Foster signing a one-year contract. He made 42 appearances during the 2009–10 season, in which the Bees trod water in mid-table before a strong finish elevated the club to a 9th-place finish. He was given a free transfer at the end of the season.

=== Wycombe Wanderers ===
On 25 June 2010, Foster and former Brentford teammate Ben Strevens joined newly relegated League Two club Wycombe Wanderers. He made 41 appearances and scored one goal during a successful 2010–11 season, in which the Chairboys secured an automatic return to League One after a third-place finish. Foster signed a new two-year contract in May 2011, but the Chairboys' return to League One was brief, with the club being relegated straight back to League Two at the end of the 2011–12 season. After overcoming a shoulder injury, Foster began the 2012–13 season as a regular, before suffering a season-ending knee injury late in a match versus Rotherham United on 20 November 2012. He underwent surgery in January 2013, but failed to recover before the end of the season. Despite being out of contract, Foster remained at Adams Park into the early months of the 2013–14 season, but was forced to retire from football in November 2013. In three seasons with Wycombe, he made 125 appearances and scored one goal.

== International career ==
Foster won three caps for England at U16 and U18 level. He made two appearances in England C's victorious 2007 Four Nations Tournament campaign.

== Coaching career ==
In May 2019, Foster was named as assistant to manager Steve Clark at Isthmian League Premier Division club Wingate & Finchley. The pair departed the club by mutual agreement on 28 September 2019.

== Honours ==
Wycombe Wanderers

- Football League Two third-place promotion: 2010–11

Dagenham & Redbridge

- Conference Premier: 2006–07

England C

- Four Nations Tournament: 2007

== Career statistics ==
Appearances and goals by club, season and competition
Club	Season	League			FA Cup		League Cup		Other		Total	
Club	Season	Division	Apps	Goals	Apps	Goals	Apps	Goals	Apps	Goals	Apps	Goals
Dagenham & Redbridge	2004–05	Conference Premier	19	0	0	0	—		3 (Note: 1 appearance in FA Trophy, 1 appearance in Conference League Cup, 1 appearance in Essex Senior Cup)	0	22	0
Dagenham & Redbridge	2005–06	Conference Premier	37	1	1	0	—		0	0	38	1
Dagenham & Redbridge	2006–07	Conference Premier	45	0	1	0	—		2 (Note: Appearances in FA Trophy)	0	48	0
Dagenham & Redbridge	2007–08	League Two	32	1	3	0	1	0	0	0	36	1
Dagenham & Redbridge	2008–09	League Two	37	2	3	0	0	0	2 (Note: Appearances in Football League Trophy)	0	42	2
Dagenham & Redbridge	Total		170	4	8	0	1	0	7	0	186	4
Brentford	2009–10	League One	36	0	4	0	1	0	1	0	42	0
Wycombe Wanderers	2010–11	League Two	38	1	1	0	1	0	1	0	41	1
Wycombe Wanderers	2011–12	League One	29	0	1	0	1	0	1	0	32	0
Wycombe Wanderers	2012–13	League Two	9	0	0	0	0	0	1	0	10	0
Wycombe Wanderers	Total		76	1	2	0	2	0	3	0	83	1
Career total			282	5	14	0	4	0	11	0	311	5
