= Paul Benson =

English footballer & coach (born 1979)

Personal information
- Full name: Paul Andrew Benson
- Date of birth: 12 October 1979 (age 47)
- Place of birth: Southend, England
- Height: 6 ft 2 in (1.88 m)
- Position: Striker

Team information
- Current team: Luton Town (academy manager)

Youth career
- Southend United

Senior career*
Years	Team	Apps	(Gls)
2003–2005	White Ensign	59	(96)
2005–2010	Dagenham & Redbridge	175	(70)
2010–2012	Charlton Athletic	33	(10)
2012–2014	Swindon Town	31	(12)
2012–2013	→ Portsmouth (loan)	7	(2)
2013	→ Cheltenham Town (loan)	16	(4)
2013–2014	→ Luton Town (loan)	36	(17)
2014–2016	Luton Town	41	(5)
2016–2017	Dagenham & Redbridge	32	(5)
2017–2018	Boreham Wood	14	(1)
2018	→ Bedford Town (loan)	13	(8)
2018–2019	Bedford Town	23	(10)
Total		480	(240)

International career
2007	England C	1	(1)
- * Club domestic league appearances and goals

Paul Andrew Benson (born 12 October 1979) is an English former professional footballer and coach who played as a striker; he last played for National League North club Bedford Town.

== Playing career ==
=== Dagenham & Redbridge ===
Born in Southend, Essex, Benson was on the books of Southend United as a youth player. He was signed by Dagenham & Redbridge manager John Still on 1 July 2005 after Still saw him play for White Ensign of the Essex Olympian League, where he scored 96 goals in 59 league matches (107 goals in 65 matches in all competitions) in just two seasons with the club. Benson's first season with Dagenham was frustrating as he was not a regular first-team player, scoring only one Conference National goal, and was out for three months with a broken leg. However, the 2006–07 season saw a complete reversal, as he earned a spot in Dagenham's first-team and finished the season as both the team and Conference National top scorer with 28 goals, leading the club's successful campaign for promotion to League Two. The following year, Dagenham's first in the Football League, Benson scored nine goals, though was injured for half the season.

The 2008–09 season saw Benson end in the top five goal scorers in League Two and come second in the player of the season poll for Dagenham. At the end of the 2009–10 season, Benson scored a goal at Wembley Stadium as Dagenham defeated Rotherham United in the play-off final to clinch a place in League One for the 2010–11 season.

=== Charlton Athletic ===
On 31 August 2010, Benson completed a move to League One club Charlton Athletic. After making 27 appearances and scoring 10 goals for Charlton in his first season, Benson's first-team chances were limited behind Charlton strikers Paul Hayes, Bradley Wright-Phillips, Jason Euell and Yann Kermorgant. Notts County made a bid to sign him, which Charlton accepted, although the move collapsed after they failed to agree personal terms. On 2 January 2012, Benson transferred to Swindon Town as part of a swap deal in exchange for Leon Clarke.

=== Swindon Town ===
Benson joined a Swindon team chasing promotion to League One. His arrival coincided with a 10-match winning run which was the platform from which the Robins' won the title under the guidance of Paolo Di Canio. Benson's first goal for Swindon came when he scored the winner in their FA Cup third-round victory over Premier League team Wigan Athletic, although replays showed he was in an offside position. Benson's goalscoring form was rewarded on 9 March 2012 when he was named League Two Player of the Month for February after scoring five goals in five matches and being widely praised by manager Paolo Di Canio. Di Canio, in a post-match press conference, was quoted as saying that "Paul Benson at 70% is better than any other striker in this league at 150%". On 28 April 2012, he scored twice as Swindon beat Port Vale 5–0 and were crowned champions of League Two in the process.

On 15 November 2012, Benson joined League One club Portsmouth on an initial one-month loan. His first goal came in a Boxing Day home league match against Crawley Town. In the following match he netted again, against Yeovil Town. He returned to Swindon in January 2013.

Benson then joined League Two club Cheltenham Town on 29 January 2013 in a loan move until the end of the 2012–13 season. He made his debut four days later in a 2–1 victory over Torquay United. Benson scored his first goal for the club on 12 February, tapping the ball past goalkeeper Paul Smith in another 2–1 victory, this time against Southend United. He ended the season with four goals in 18 appearances for the club.

=== Luton Town ===
On 26 August 2013, Benson signed for Conference Premier club Luton Town on a season-long loan, with the possibility of a permanent transfer taking place in the summer of 2014. This move saw him link back up with his former Dagenham & Redbridge manager John Still, now in charge of Luton. Benson made his debut for the club on 31 August 2013, winning a penalty in a 2–0 away win over Kidderminster Harriers. He was named as the Conference Premier Player of the Month in December 2013 after scoring four goals in four matches and contributing to numerous other goals with his hold-up play. Benson played a key role as Luton won promotion to League Two, scoring 17 league goals and assisting 14 others throughout the 2013–14 season. His strike partnership with Andre Gray resulted in the two scoring 47 goals between them – almost half of Luton's total league goals.

After his successful loan spell at Luton during the 2013–14 season, Benson signed a permanent two-year contract with the club on 22 July 2014. Benson scored his only league goal of the season in a 3–0 win over Mansfield Town on 29 November 2014, but also broke his leg during the match. He returned to the squad later in the season and made a total of 24 appearances in all competitions.

On 10 May 2016, it was announced that Benson would not have his contract renewed. He left the club upon the expiry of his contract.

=== Return to Dagenham & Redbridge ===
Benson re-signed for Dagenham & Redbridge who were newly relegated into the National League, on an initial one-year contract on 6 August 2016. He made his second debut three days later as a 77th-minute substitute in a 3–0 defeat away to Chester. His first goal came in a 2–1 win away to Dover Athletic on 3 December, and this was followed up with a goal in the following match, a 2–1 defeat at home to Worthing in the FA Trophy first round. Benson played in both legs of the play-off semi-final defeat to Forest Green Rovers, losing 3–1 on aggregate, and finished the season with 37 appearances and six goals. He was released by Dagenham & Redbridge when his contract expired at the end of 2016–17.

=== Boreham Wood and Bedford Town ===
On 13 June 2017, Benson signed for National League club Boreham Wood on a one-year contract, with the option of a one-year extension. He joined Southern League Division One East club Bedford Town on 26 January 2018 on loan until the end of 2017–18. Benson finished the loan with eight goals from 13 appearances. He was not retained by Boreham Wood after the end of the season. Benson re-signed for Bedford Town as a player-coach on 26 June.

== Coaching career ==
From Benson's arrival at Bedford Town in June 2018 until the summer of 2019, where he was a player-coach at Bedford, he worked at Luton Town's academy, coaching the U13 squad. From the summer 2019, he was hired as assistant to professional development phase lead coach, Dan Walder, helping with the U16s and U18s on a daily basis. He was appointed as academy manager at Luton Town in May 2023.

== Career statistics ==
As of end of 2018–19 season

Appearances and goals by club, season and competition
Club	Season	League			FA Cup		League Cup		Other		Total	
Club	Season	Division	Apps	Goals	Apps	Goals	Apps	Goals	Apps	Goals	Apps	Goals
Dagenham & Redbridge	2005–06	Conference National	26	1	2	0	—		3 (Note: One appearance and one goal in Football League Trophy, two appearances in FA Trophy)	1	31	2
Dagenham & Redbridge	2006–07	Conference National	46	28	1	0	—		2 (Note: Appearances in FA Trophy)	2	49	30
Dagenham & Redbridge	2007–08	League Two	22	6	2	3	0	0	2 (Note: Appearance(s) in Football League Trophy)	0	26	9
Dagenham & Redbridge	2008–09	League Two	33	18	3	1	1	0	3	2	40	21
Dagenham & Redbridge	2009–10	League Two	45	17	1	1	1	0	4 (Note: One appearance in Football League Trophy, three appearances and four goals in League Two play-offs)	4	51	22
Dagenham & Redbridge	2010–11	League One	3	0	—		1	0	—		4	0
Dagenham & Redbridge	Total		175	70	9	5	3	0	14	9	201	84
Charlton Athletic	2010–11	League One	32	10	4	0	—		3	0	39	10
Charlton Athletic	2011–12	League One	1	0	—		2	1	0	0	3	1
Charlton Athletic	Total		33	10	4	0	2	1	3	0	42	11
Swindon Town	2011–12	League Two	22	11	2	1	—		2	0	26	12
Swindon Town	2012–13	League One	9	1	0	0	3	2	1	0	13	3
Swindon Town	Total		31	12	2	1	3	2	3	0	39	15
Portsmouth (loan)	2012–13	League One	7	2	—		—		—		7	2
Cheltenham Town (loan)	2012–13	League Two	16	4	—		—		2 (Note: Appearances in League Two play-offs)	0	18	4
Luton Town (loan)	2013–14	Conference Premier	36	17	2	1	—		0	0	38	18
Luton Town	2014–15	League Two	21	1	1	1	1	0	1	0	24	2
Luton Town	2015–16	League Two	20	4	1	0	2	1	0	0	23	5
Luton Town	Total		77	22	4	2	3	1	1	0	85	25
Dagenham & Redbridge	2016–17	National League	32	5	2	0	—		3 (Note: One appearance and one goal in FA Trophy, two appearances in National League play-offs)	1	37	6
Boreham Wood	2017–18	National League	14	1	0	0	—		0	0	14	1
Bedford Town (loan)	2017–18	Southern League Division One East	13	8	—		—		—		13	8
Bedford Town	2018–19	Southern League Division One Central	23	10	3	1	—		8	3	34	14
Bedford Town	Total		36	18	3	1	—		8	3	47	22
Career total			421	144	24	9	11	4	34	13	490	170

== Honours ==
Dagenham & Redbridge

- Football League Two play-offs: 2010
- Conference National: 2006–07

Swindon Town

- Football League Two: 2011–12
- Football League Trophy runner-up: 2011–12

Luton Town

- Conference Premier: 2013–14

Individual

- Football League Two Player of the Month: February 2012
- Conference Premier Player of the Month: December 2013
