= Ben Strevens =

English footballer (born 1980)

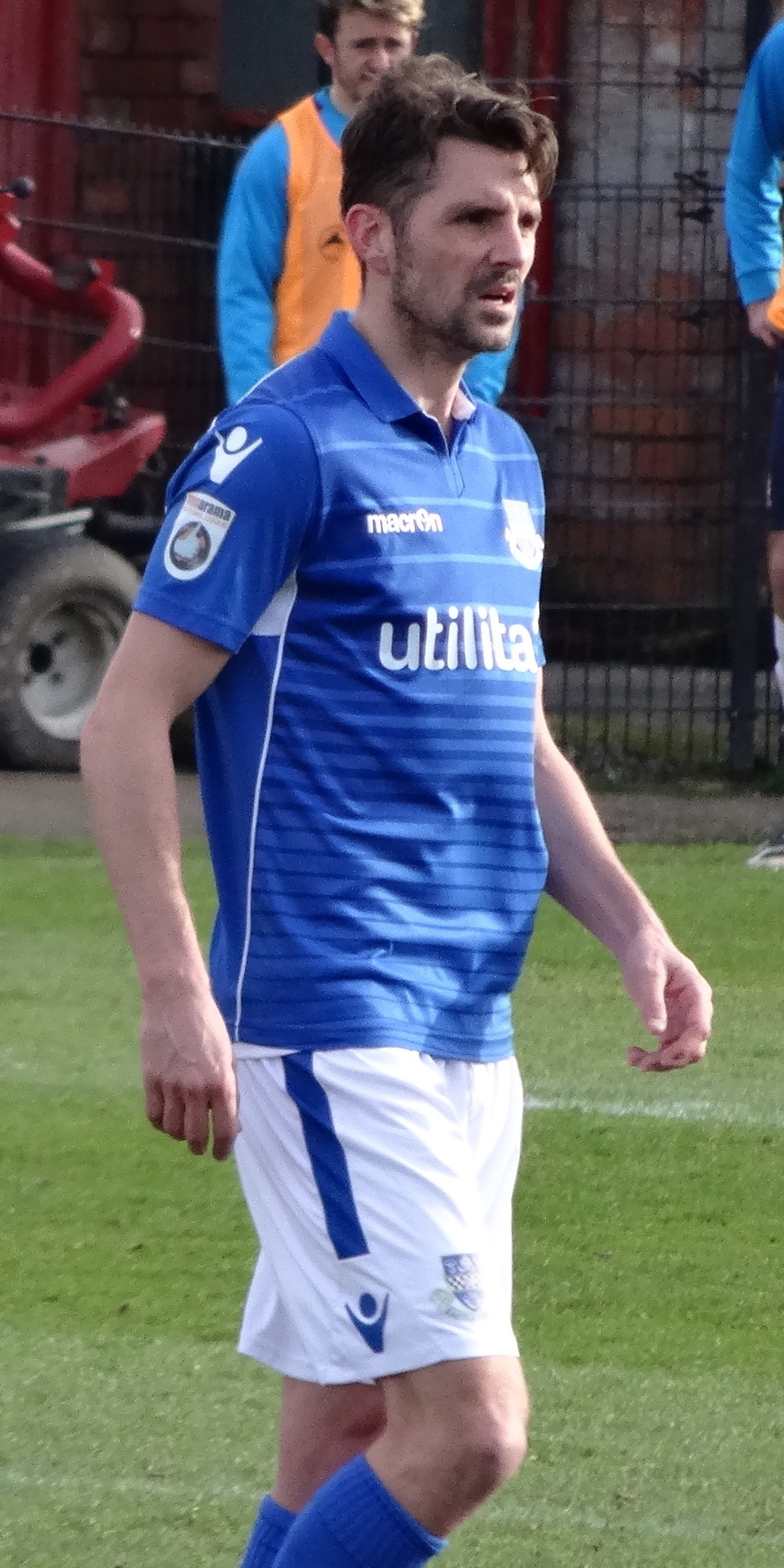
- Strevens playing for Eastleigh in 2017

Personal information
- Full name: Benjamin John Strevens
- Date of birth: 24 May 1980 (age 46)
- Place of birth: Edgware, England
- Height: 6 ft 1 in (1.85 m)
- Position: Forward

Team information
- Current team: Luton Town (Head of Academy Coaching)

Senior career*
Years	Team	Apps	(Gls)
–1999	Wingate & Finchley		
1999–2006	Barnet	195	(42)
1999	→ Wingate & Finchley (loan)		
2000	→ Slough Town (loan)	4	(2)
2001	→ St Albans City (loan)	3	(2)
2006	Crawley Town	15	(4)
2006–2009	Dagenham & Redbridge	111	(34)
2009–2010	Brentford	25	(6)
2010–2012	Wycombe Wanderers	76	(11)
2012–2013	Gillingham	12	(1)
2013	Dagenham & Redbridge	14	(1)
2013–2016	Eastleigh	120	(21)
2016	Whitehawk	12	(0)
2016–2018	Eastleigh	21	(1)
Total		604	(125)

Managerial career
- 2016: Whitehawk (caretaker)
- 2018–2022: Eastleigh
- 2023–2024: Dagenham & Redbridge
- * Club domestic league appearances and goals

Benjamin John Strevens (born 24 May 1980) is an English former professional footballer and manager who played as a striker or an attacking midfielder. He is currently Head of Academy Coaching at Luton Town.

== Playing career ==
Strevens began his career at Wingate & Finchley and in the 1998–99 season in the Isthmian League Division Three he scored 28 league goals coming joint second in the top scorers chart, helping the side to promotion. He was then signed by Barnet, having scored 38 goals in 67 appearances for the Blues.

He was then loaned out to Slough Town and then to St Albans City, before becoming a regular first team player for the Bees. He made 41 appearances in 2005–06 season for Barnet, by which point he was their longest serving player, but left the club at the end of the season, having scored 42 career goals for the club.

He was the only player in the Barnet squad to be relegated to the Conference National in 2000–01 season, and then be re-promoted back into the Football League in 2004–05. He was picked up on free transfer by Crawley Town and scored his first goal for the club on his debut against Rushden & Diamonds.

Strevens suffered a fractured cheek bone and damaged eye socket in Crawley's 3–2 defeat to Lewes in an FA Cup game in 2006.

He signed for Dagenham & Redbridge in December 2006, whom he was promoted with at the end of the 2006–07 season into League Two. At the end of the 2008–09 season he signed for Brentford, along with Dagenham teammates Danny Foster and Sam Saunders. He joined Wycombe Wanderers in 2010, helping them to win promotion to League One in his first season, only to be relegated back to League Two the following year. Strevens was then released by Wycombe in May 2012. On 20 July 2012, Strevens signed a one-year deal at League Two club Gillingham. He made his debut in a League Cup game on 14 August 2012, scoring his first professional goal for the club. His first league goal came on 10 November away at Plymouth Argyle.

After being made available for a free transfer from Gillingham by Martin Allen in January 2013, Strevens signed for Dagenham & Redbridge on the January 2013 transfer deadline day. On 7 May 2013, he was released by the Daggers due to the expiry of his contract and joined Conference South club Eastleigh. Strevens played an integral part in Eastleigh's championship winning team in his first year at the club and their first season at Conference Premier level.

He worked as player/assistant-manager under Chris Todd during the latter stages of the 2015–16 season and was caretaker manager for one National League match at Wrexham in August 2016, following Todd's departure and his replacement by Ronnie Moore. Despite signing a further extension to his contract at the start of the 2016–17 season, Strevens left Eastleigh by mutual agreement in September 2016 to rejoin his former manager Richard Hill at National League South club Whitehawk.

After Hill left in November to join Aston Villa as a scout, Strevens was appointed temporary player/joint manager. His first game in joint charge ended in a 4–4 draw, with Strevens having a last minute penalty saved by Gosport Borough defender Brett Poate, who had taken over in goal with his keeper off injured. After two more games, Strevens returned to Eastleigh.

== Managerial career ==
On 5 November 2018, Strevens was appointed as permanent manager of Eastleigh after a spell as caretaker manager.

On 26 January 2022, Strevens left the club by mutual consent with the club sitting in 14th place. His last match in charge was a 1–0 defeat to Dover Athletic, the opposition's first victory in 364 days.

On 10 March 2023, Strevens was appointed manager of his former club Dagenham & Redbridge. He was awarded the National League Manager of the Month award for March 2024 having guided his side away from the relegation zone with an impressive run of form. He left the club on 26 December 2024 after a poor run of results left the Daggers five points above the relegation zone.

In June 2025, Strevens returned to Luton Town in the role of Head of Academy Coaching, having previously coached with the club's youth sides prior to his appointment as Dagenham & Redbridge manager.

== Career statistics ==
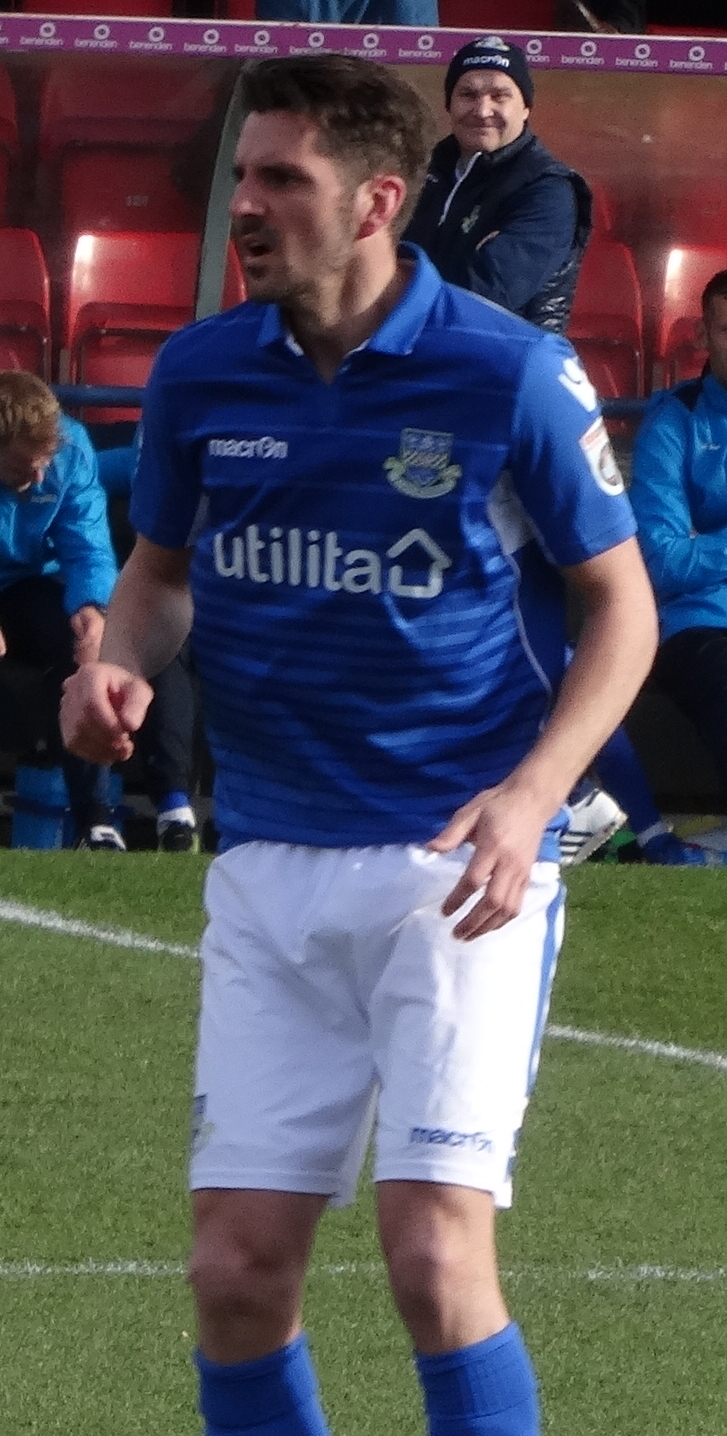
Strevens playing for Eastleigh in 2017

As of match played 30 December 2017

Appearances and goals by club, season and competition
Club	Season	League			FA Cup		League Cup		Other		Total	
Club	Season	Division	Apps	Goals	Apps	Goals	Apps	Goals	Apps	Goals	Apps	Goals
Barnet	1998–99	Third Division	0	0	0	0	0	0	0	0	0	0
Barnet	1999–2000	Third Division	7	0	1	0	1	0	0	0	9	0
Barnet	2000–01	Third Division	28	4	0	0	2	0	1 (Note: Appearance(s) in Football League Trophy)	0	31	4
Barnet	2001–02	Football Conference	24	9	2	0	—		4 (Note: Three appearances, two goals in Football League Trophy; one appearance in FA Trophy)	2	30	11
Barnet	2002–03	Football Conference	23	9	0	0	—		0	0	23	9
Barnet	2003–04	Football Conference	39	9	3	0	—		3 (Note: Two appearances in Conference National play-offs; one appearance in FA Trophy)	1	45	10
Barnet	2004–05	Conference National	39	6	2	0	—		2 (Note: Appearance(s) in FA Trophy)	0	43	6
Barnet	2005–06	League Two	35	5	1	0	3	0	2	0	41	5
Barnet	Total		195	42	9	0	6	0	12	3	222	45
Slough Town (loan)	1999–2000	IL – Premier Division	4	2	0	0	—		1 (Note: Appearance in Isthmian League Cup)	0	5	2
St Albans City (loan)	2000–01	IL – Premier Division	3	1	0	0	—		3 (Note: Two appearances, one goal in FA Trophy; one appearance, one goal in Isthmian League Cup)	2	6	3
Crawley Town	2006–07	Conference National	15	4	1	0	—		0	0	16	4
Dagenham & Redbridge	2006–07	Conference National	21	6	—		—		—		21	6
Dagenham & Redbridge	2007–08	League Two	46	15	3	3	1	1	2	1	52	20
Dagenham & Redbridge	2008–09	League Two	46	14	3	1	1	0	2	0	52	15
Dagenham & Redbridge	Total		113	35	6	4	2	1	4	1	125	41
Brentford	2009–10	League One	25	6	4	1	0	0	0	0	29	7
Wycombe Wanderers	2010–11	League Two	40	7	3	0	1	1	2	0	46	8
Wycombe Wanderers	2011–12	League One	36	4	1	0	0	0	1	0	38	4
Wycombe Wanderers	Total		76	11	4	0	1	1	3	0	84	12
Gillingham	2012–13	League Two	12	1	0	0	2	1	1	0	15	2
Dagenham & Redbridge	2012–13	League Two	14	1	—		—		—		14	1
Eastleigh	2013–14	Conference South	42	8	2	0	—		5	3	49	11
Eastleigh	2014–15	Conference Premier	45	7	3	1	—		3 (Note: Two appearances in Conference Premier play-offs; one in FA Trophy)	0	51	8
Eastleigh	2015–16	National League	31	6	5	1	—		2	0	38	7
Eastleigh	Total		118	21	10	2	—		10	3	138	26
Whitehawk	2016–17	National League South	12	0	5	0	—		0	0	17	0
Eastleigh	2016–17	National League	14	0	—		—		0	0	14	0
Eastleigh	2017–18	National League	7	1	1	0	—		0	0	8	1
Eastleigh	Total		21	1	1	0	0	0	0	0	22	1
Career total			608	125	40	7	11	3	34	9	693	144

== Managerial statistics ==
As of 26 December 2024

Managerial record by team and tenure
Team	Nat	From	To	Record					Ref
Team	Nat	From	To	G	W	D	L	Win %	Ref
Eastleigh	(England)	8 October 2018	26 January 2022	154	61	41	52	39.61	
Dagenham & Redbridge	(England)	10 March 2023	26 December 2024	88	28	26	34	31.82	
Total				242	89	67	86	36.78	—

== Honours ==
=== As a player ===
Barnet

- Conference National: 2004–05

Dagenham & Redbridge

- Conference National: 2006–07

Gillingham

- Football League Two: 2012–13

=== As a manager ===
Individual

- National League Manager of the Month: March 2024
