= Dave Rainford =

English footballer (born 1979)

Personal information
- Full name: David John Rainford
- Date of birth: 21 April 1979 (age 47)
- Place of birth: Stepney, England
- Height: 6 ft 0 in (1.83 m)
- Position: Midfielder

Team information
- Current team: Brentford (academy director)

Youth career
- West Ham United
- –1997: Colchester United

Senior career*
Years	Team	Apps	(Gls)
1997–1999	Colchester United	1	(0)
1997–1998	→ Wivenhoe Town (loan)	2	(0)
1999	→ Scarborough (loan)	2	(0)
2000–2001	Slough Town	44	(3)
2001–2002	Grays Athletic	20	(3)
2002	Heybridge Swifts	17	(1)
2002–2003	Ford United	3	(0)
2003	Slough Town	0	(0)
2003–2006	Bishop's Stortford	123	(28)
2006–2008	Dagenham & Redbridge	69	(19)
2008–2013	Chelmsford City	168	(53)
2013–2014	A.F.C. Hornchurch	27	(0)
Total		475	(107)
- * Club domestic league appearances and goals

David John Rainford (born 21 April 1979) is an English former footballer who is currently director of the Brentford Academy.

Rainford left Dagenham & Redbridge at the end of the 2007–08 season after he was offered a senior teaching role at a local school. During the 2007–08 season, Rainford had become known for being the only semi-professional player in the Football League.

In June 2008 Rainford joined Chelmsford City. On 8 June 2012 he was confirmed as their assistant manager following the departure of Ben Chenery.

== Honours ==
- Conference National (V): 2007

== Personal life ==
Rainford has a daughter, Molly, an actress and singer.
