= Ed Thompson (footballer) =

English footballer

Edward Peter Thompson (born 8 January 1983) is an English footballer who plays as a goalkeeper for Harlow Town. He signed for Dagenham & Redbridge from Wingate & Finchley in the summer of 2007, after impressing in a number of pre-season friendly matches. He was released in January 2009 after long-term knee problems and later joined Thurrock.
