= Marlon Patterson =

English footballer

Personal information
- Full name: Marlon Anthony Patterson
- Date of birth: 24 June 1983 (age 43)
- Place of birth: Southwark, England
- Height: 5 ft 8 in (1.73 m)
- Position: Defender

Team information
- Current team: Beckenham Town

Youth career
- Millwall
- Chelsea

Senior career*
Years	Team	Apps	(Gls)
	Fisher Athletic	?	(0)
?–2004	Carshalton Athletic	?	(?)
2004–?	Dulwich Hamlet	?	(?)
?–2007	Yeading	?	(?)
2007–2009	Dagenham & Redbridge	6	(0)
2007	→ Welling United (loan)	?	(?)
2008	→ Grays Athletic (loan)	9	(0)
2009	Histon	1	(0)
2009–2011	Chelmsford City	28	(1)
2011	Bromley	85	(0)
2011	Thurrock	?	(0)
2011–2013	Bromley	100	(0)
2013	Hayes & Yeading United	1	(0)
2014	Chelmsford City	2	(0)
2014	Dulwich Hamlet	8	(0)
2014	Cray Wanderers	9	(0)
2015	Hastings United	6	(0)
2015–	Beckenham Town		
- * Club domestic league appearances and goals as of 14:32, 23 September 2011 (UTC)

Marlon Anthony Patterson (born 24 June 1983) is an English footballer who plays for Southern Counties East side Beckenham Town. He plays primarily as a left-back

== Career ==
Born in London, Patterson played for the Millwall and Chelsea youth systems. Patterson signed for Dulwich Hamlet in December 2004 following periods with Fisher Athletic and Carshalton Athletic. He signed for Dagenham & Redbridge on 7 August 2007 from Yeading. Earlier in the 2007–08 season, he had a short loan period with Welling United before joining Grays Athletic on 25 February 2008.

Patterson signed for Histon in January 2009. He made his debut in the same month, in the FA Cup third round against Swansea City on 13 January. He left Histon in May 2009. He joined Conference South club, Chelmsford City in December 2009 and then moved to Bromley before he moved to Thurrock in February 2011. He then re-signed for Bromley at the start of the 2011–12 season, before being released at the end of the 2012–13 season.

Patterson played for Hayes & Yeading United and Chelmsford City during the 2013–14 season, before returning to Dulwich Hamlet for the start of the 2014–15 season, with the signing being funded by the Dulwich Hamlet 12th Man scheme.

After a short spell at Cray Wanderers, in March 2015, Patterson joined Hastings United of the Isthmian League Division One South.

== Honours ==
=== Club ===
Bromley

- London Senior Cup (1): 2012–13
