= Richard Graham (footballer, born 1979) =

Northern Irish footballer (born 1979)

Personal information
- Full name: Richard Stephen Graham
- Date of birth: 5 August 1979 (age 47)
- Place of birth: Newry, Northern Ireland
- Height: 5 ft 10 in (1.78 m)
- Position: Midfielder

Team information
- Current team: Wingate & Finchley (Assistant manager)

Youth career
- ?–1996: Queens Park Rangers

Senior career*
Years	Team	Apps	(Gls)
1996–2001	Queens Park Rangers	2	(0)
2001–2002	Chesham United	27	(9)
2002–2003	Billericay Town	31	(3)
2003–2004	Kettering Town	34	(2)
2004–2007	Barnet	87	(7)
2007–2009	Dagenham & Redbridge	12	(0)
2009	→ Kettering Town (loan)	12	(0)
2009–2010	Grays Athletic	36	(1)
2010–2011	Eastleigh	42	(6)
2011–2012	Dartford	31	(0)
2012–2014	St Albans City	75	(5)
2014	Chesham United		
2014–2015	Wingate & Finchley	8	(0)
2015–2016	VCD Athletic	23	(1)
Total		420	(34)

International career
1998–2001	Northern Ireland U21	15	(0)
- * Club domestic league appearances and goals

Richard Stephen Graham (born 5 August 1979) is a Northern Irish retired footballer who is assistant manager for Wingate & Finchley. He played as a left-midfielder.

== Career ==
Born in Newry, County Down, Graham began his career in the Queens Park Rangers youth system, making two first team appearances in the Football League, but he was released in 2001. He moved into non-League football, joining Barnet in 2004 and helped them return to the Football League. He was released by the club in April 2007, subsequently joining Dagenham & Redbridge in June.

On 1 January 2009, Graham joined former club Kettering Town on loan for the remainder of the 2008–09 Conference National season. He made his debut two days later in a 2–1 victory over Eastwood Town in the FA Cup, with his performance being described as the "most impressive". He signed for Grays Athletic on 24 July, along with Charlie Taylor and Shayne Mangodza. He was released at the end of the 2009–10 season. In June 2011, Graham signed for Dartford. On 20 July 2012, Graham joined St Albans City. On 27 March 2014, Graham joined Chesham United a week after being released by St Albans City after 75 appearances and five goals.

During the 2014-15 season, Graham made eight league appearances for Wingate & Finchley in the Isthmian Premier Division, before moving to league rivals VCD Athletic, where he was an ever-present throughout the first half of the 2015-16 season. He departed VCD Athletic in January 2016.
