= 2010 Football League play-offs =

Football League play-offs
- Season: 2009–10
- Champions: Blackpool (Championship); Millwall (League One); Dagenham & Redbridge (League Two)
- Matches: 15
- Goals: 47 (3.13 per match)
- Biggest home win: Dagenham 6–0 Morecambe (League Two)
- Biggest away win: Nottm Forest 3–4 Blackpool (Championship)
- Highest scoring: Nottm Forest 3–4 Blackpool (7 goals)
- Highest attendance: 82,244 – Blackpool v Cardiff (Championship final)
- Lowest attendance: 4,566 – Dagenham v Morecambe (League Two semi-final)
- Average attendance: 24,670

The Football League play-offs for the 2009–10 season were held in May 2010, with the finals taking place at Wembley Stadium in London. The play-off semi-finals were played over two legs, contested by the teams who finished in 3rd, 4th, 5th and 6th place in the Football League Championship and League One and the 4th, 5th, 6th and 7th placed teams in the League Two table. The winners of the semi-finals went through to the finals, with the winner of the final gaining promotion for the following season.

== Background ==
The Football League play-offs have been held every year since 1987. They take place for each division following the conclusion of the regular season and are contested by the four clubs finishing below the automatic promotion places.

In the Championship, Nottingham Forest, who were aiming to return to the top flight for the first time since 1999, finished 12 points behind second placed West Bromwich Albion, who in turn finished 11 points behind champions Newcastle United, who returned to the top flight at the first attempt after relegation from the Premier League on the last day the season before. Cardiff City who haven't been in the top flight since 1962, finished in fourth place in the table. Leicester City who finished as champions of League One the season before, finished in fifth place looking for a return to the top flight for the first time in 6 years. Blackpool finished 6 points behind Leicester and Cardiff on 70 points, looking for a first spell back in the top flight since 1971.

== Championship ==
Pos	Team	Pld	W	D	L	GF	GA	GD	Pts
3	Nottingham Forest	46	22	13	11	65	40	+25	79
4	Cardiff City	46	22	10	14	73	54	+19	76
5	Leicester City	46	21	13	12	61	45	+16	76
6	Blackpool	46	19	13	14	74	58	+16	70

=== Semi-finals ===
First leg

8 May 2010
12:45

Blackpool	2–1	Nottingham Forest
Southern 26'; Adam 57' (pen.)	Report	Cohen 13'

Bloomfield Road, Blackpool
Attendance: 11,805
Referee: Phil Dowd

9 May 2010
13:15

Leicester City	0–1	Cardiff City
	Report	Whittingham 78'

Walkers Stadium, Leicester
Attendance: 29,165
Referee: Alan Wiley

Second leg

11 May 2010
19:45

Nottingham Forest	3–4	Blackpool
Earnshaw 7', 66'; Adebola 90+2'	Report	Campbell 56', 76', 79'; Dobbie 72'

City Ground, Nottingham
Attendance: 28,358
Referee: Mark Clattenburg

Blackpool won 6–4 on aggregate.

12 May 2010
19:45

Cardiff City	2–3 (a.e.t.)	Leicester City
Chopra 21'; Whittingham 69' (pen.)	Report	Fryatt 25'; Hudson 36' (o.g.); King 49'
Penalties
Chopra (penalty scored); McCormack (penalty scored); Ledley (penalty scored); Kennedy (penalty scored)	4–3	(penalty scored) Berner; (penalty scored) Howard; (penalty scored) Solano; (penalty missed) Kermorgant; (penalty missed) Waghorn

Cardiff City Stadium, Cardiff
Attendance: 26,033
Referee: Howard Webb

Cardiff City 3–3 Leicester City on aggregate. Cardiff City won 4-3 on penalties.

=== Final ===
22 May 2010
15:00

Blackpool	3-2	Cardiff City
Adam 13'; Taylor-Fletcher 41'; Ormerod 45+1'	Report	Chopra 9'; Ledley 37'

Wembley Stadium, London
Attendance: 82,244
Referee: Andre Marriner

== League One ==
Pos	Team	Pld	W	D	L	GF	GA	GD	Pts
3	Millwall	46	24	13	9	76	44	32	85
4	Charlton Athletic	46	23	15	8	71	48	23	84
5	Swindon Town	46	22	16	8	73	57	16	82
6	Huddersfield Town	46	23	11	12	82	56	26	80

=== Semi-finals ===
First leg

14 May 2010
19:45

Swindon Town	2–1	Charlton Athletic
Austin 52'; Ward 60'	Report	Burton 65'

The County Ground, Swindon
Attendance: 13,560
Referee: James Linington

15 May 2010
12:15

Huddersfield Town	0–0	Millwall
	Report

Galpharm Stadium, Huddersfield
Attendance: 14,654
Referee: Darren Deadman

Second leg

17 May 2010
19:45

Charlton Athletic	2–1 (a.e.t.)	Swindon Town
Ferry 27' (o.g.); Mooney 45'	Report	Ward 74'
Penalties
Burton (penalty scored); Bailey (penalty missed); Forster (penalty scored); Dailly (penalty scored); Richardson (penalty scored)	4–5	(penalty scored) McGovern; (penalty scored) Austin; (penalty scored) Amankwaah; (penalty scored) Ward; (penalty scored) Darby

The Valley, London
Attendance: 21,521
Referee: Neil Swarbrick

Charlton Athletic 3–3 Swindon Town on aggregate. Swindon Town won 5–4 on penalties.

18 May 2010
19:45

Millwall	2–0	Huddersfield Town
Morison 23'; Robinson 82'	Report

The Den, London
Attendance: 15,463
Referee: Anthony Bates

Millwall won 2–0 on aggregate.

=== Final ===
29 May 2010
15:00

Millwall	1–0	Swindon Town
Robinson 39'	Report

Wembley Stadium, London
Attendance: 73,108
Referee: Colin Webster

== League Two ==
Pos	Team	Pld	W	D	L	GF	GA	GD	Pts
4	Morecambe	46	20	13	13	73	64	+9	73
5	Rotherham United	46	21	10	15	55	52	+3	73
6	Aldershot Town	46	20	12	14	69	56	+13	72
7	Dagenham & Redbridge	46	20	12	14	69	58	+11	72

=== Semi-finals ===
First leg

15 May 2010
18:00

Aldershot Town	0–1	Rotherham United
	Report	Le Fondre 88'

Recreation Ground, Aldershot
Attendance: 5,470
Referee: Andy D'Urso

16 May 2010
13:30

Dagenham & Redbridge	6–0	Morecambe
Benson 4', 66'; Scott 35', 48', 54', 69'	Report

Victoria Road, Dagenham
Attendance: 4,566
Referee: Colin Webster

Second leg

19 May 2010
19:45

Rotherham United	2–0	Aldershot Town
Le Fondre 43'; Ellison 68'	Report

Don Valley Stadium, Sheffield
Attendance: 7,082
Referee: Fred Graham

Rotherham United won 3–0 on aggregate.

20 May 2010
19:45

Morecambe	2–1	Dagenham & Redbridge
Duffy 81'; Artell 90'	Report	Benson 85'

Christie Park, Morecambe
Attendance: 4,972
Referee: Eddie Ilderton

Dagenham & Redbridge won 7–2 on aggregate.

=== Final ===
30 May 2010
15:00

Dagenham & Redbridge	3–2	Rotherham United
Benson 38'; Green 56'; Nurse 70'	Report	Taylor 39', 61'

Wembley Stadium, London
Attendance: 32,054
Referee: James Linington
