= 2024–25 National League =

The 2024–25 National League season, known as the Vanarama National League for sponsorship reasons, was the tenth season under the title of the National League, the twenty-first season consisting of three divisions, and the forty-sixth season overall.

== National League ==
National League
- Season: 2024–25
- Champions: Barnet
- Promoted: Barnet; Oldham Athletic
- Relegated: Dagenham & Redbridge; Maidenhead United; AFC Fylde; Ebbsfleet United
- Matches: 552
- Goals: 1,488 (2.7 per match)
- Top goalscorer: (England) Ollie Pearce (30 goals)
- Biggest home win: Barnet 7–0 Tamworth, 31 August 2024
- Biggest away win: Ebbsfleet United 0–6 Solihull Moors, 16 November 2024
- Highest scoring: York City 7–2 Aldershot Town, 12 April 2025
- Longest winning run: 9 matches Barnet
- Longest unbeaten run: 25 matches Barnet
- Longest winless run: 28 matches Ebbsfleet United
- Longest losing run: 6 matches Gateshead
- All statistics correct as of 12:10, 13 April 2025.

Twenty-four teams compete in the league – eighteen returning teams from the previous season, two teams relegated from League Two, two teams promoted from the National League North and two teams promoted from the National League South.

=== Team changes ===
To National League

Promoted from National League North

- Tamworth
- Boston United

Promoted from National League South

- Yeovil Town
- Braintree Town

Relegated from League Two

- Forest Green Rovers
- Sutton United

From National League

Promoted to League Two

- Chesterfield
- Bromley

Relegated to National League North

- Kidderminster Harriers
- Oxford City

Relegated to National League South

- Boreham Wood
- Dorking Wanderers

=== Stadiums and locations ===
Locations of the 2024–25 National League clubs
Locations of the 2024–25 National League clubs (Greater London)

Team	Location	Stadium	Capacity
AFC Fylde	Wesham	Mill Farm Sports Village	6,000
Aldershot Town	Aldershot	EBB Stadium at The Recreation Ground	7,200
Altrincham	Altrincham	Moss Lane	7,700
Barnet	London (Canons Park)	The Hive Stadium	6,418
Boston United	Boston	Jakemans Community Stadium	5,061
Braintree Town	Braintree	Cressing Road	4,222
Dagenham & Redbridge	London (Dagenham)	Chigwell Construction Stadium	6,078
Eastleigh	Eastleigh	Silverlake Stadium	5,250
Ebbsfleet United	Northfleet	Stonebridge Road	4,800
FC Halifax Town	Halifax	The Shay	10,400
Forest Green Rovers	Nailsworth	The Bolt New Lawn	5,147
Gateshead	Gateshead	Gateshead International Stadium	11,800
Hartlepool United	Hartlepool	Victoria Park	7,856
Maidenhead United	Maidenhead	York Road	4,000
Oldham Athletic	Oldham	Boundary Park	13,513
Rochdale	Rochdale	Crown Oil Arena	10,249
Solihull Moors	Solihull	Damson Park	5,500
Southend United	Southend-on-Sea	Roots Hall	12,392
Sutton United	London (Sutton)	VBS Community Stadium	5,013
Tamworth	Tamworth	The Lamb Ground	4,565
Wealdstone	London (Ruislip)	Grosvenor Vale	4,085
Woking	Woking	The Laithwaite Community Stadium	6,036
Yeovil Town	Yeovil	Huish Park	9,566
York City	York	York Community Stadium	8,500

=== Personnel and sponsoring ===
Team	Manager	Captain	Kit manufacturer	Shirt sponsor
AFC Fylde	(England) Chris Neal & (Scotland) David Longwell (interim)	(England) Alex Whitmore	(United States) New Balance	FWP Architecture
Aldershot Town	(England) Tommy Widdrington	(England) Aaron Jones	(Italy) Erreà	Bridges Estate Agents
Altrincham	(England) Phil Parkinson	(England) Lewis Baines	(Germany) Puma	AO World
Barnet	(Republic of Ireland) Dean Brennan	(England) Anthony Hartigan	(Netherlands) Stanno	TIC Health
Boston United	(Republic of Ireland) Graham Coughlan	(England) Michael Bostwick	(England) Umbro	Kia
Braintree Town	(England) Steve Pitt	(England) George Langston	(England) Andreas Carter Sports	Andreas Carter Sports
Dagenham & Redbridge	(England) Lewis Young	(England) Elliot Justham	(England) Admiral	West & Coe
Eastleigh	(England) Kelvin Davis	(Wales) Jake Taylor	(Italy) Erreà	Utilita
Ebbsfleet United	(England) Josh Wright	(England) Luke O'Neill	(United States) New Balance	Virtue Clean Energy
FC Halifax Town	(England) Chris Millington	(England) Sam Johnson	(Germany) Adidas	Nuie
Forest Green Rovers	(England) Steve Cotterill	(England) Jordan Moore-Taylor	(England) Umbro	Ecotricity
Gateshead	(Northern Ireland) Carl Magnay	(England) Greg Olley	(Belgium) Patrick	Gateshead Central
Hartlepool United	(Australia) Anthony Limbrick	(England) David Ferguson	(Italy) Erreà	Utilita
Maidenhead United	(England) Alan Devonshire	(England) Alan Massey	(Spain) Kelme	CALM
Oldham Athletic	(Scotland) Micky Mellon	(England) Liam Hogan	(Germany) Puma	RRG Group
Rochdale	(Scotland) Jimmy McNulty	(England) Ethan Ebanks-Landell	(Republic of Ireland) O'Neills	Crown Oil
Solihull Moors	(England) Matt Taylor	(Republic of Ireland) James Clarke	(Germany) Adidas	Taxbuddi
Southend United	(Republic of Ireland) Kevin Maher	(England) Nathan Ralph	(Italy) Macron	c2c
Sutton United	(Wales) Steve Morison	(England) Tyler French	(Republic of Ireland) O'Neills	Echo Laser BPH therapy
Tamworth	(England) Andy Peaks	(England) Ben Milnes	(Italy) Macron	Bradley Scott Windows
Wealdstone	(Wales) Neil Gibson	(England) Jack Cook	(Spain) Kelme	Brunel University London
Woking	(England) Neal Ardley	(Northern Ireland) Dale Gorman	(Germany) Adidas	Boz's Fruit & Veg
Yeovil Town	(England) Mark Cooper	(England) Matt Worthington	(Italy) Erreà	Bradfords Buildings Supplies
York City	(England) Adam Hinshelwood	(England) Lenell John-Lewis	(Denmark) Hummel	Titan Wealth

=== Managerial changes ===
Team	Outgoing manager	Manner of departure	Date of vacancy	Position in table	Incoming manager	Date of appointment
Wealdstone	(Guyana) Sam Cox	End of interim spell	20 April 2024	Pre-season	(England) Matthew Taylor	11 May 2024
Hartlepool United	(England) Kevin Phillips	End of contract	27 April 2024	Pre-season	(England) Darren Sarll	27 April 2024
Ebbsfleet United	(England) Danny Searle	Sacked	9 September 2024	24th	(England) Harry Watling	12 September 2024
AFC Fylde	(England) Chris Beech	Sacked	15 September 2024	23rd	(England) Kevin Phillips	8 October 2024
Gateshead	(Republic of Ireland) Rob Elliot	Signed by Crawley Town	1 October 2024	5th	(Northern Ireland) Carl Magnay	15 October 2024
Hartlepool United	(England) Darren Sarll	Sacked	16 October 2024	16th	(England) Lennie Lawrence	8 November 2024
Boston United	(England) Ian Culverhouse	Sacked	28 October 2024	23rd	(Republic of Ireland) Graham Coughlan	19 November 2024
Braintree Town	(England) Angelo Harrop	Sacked	27 November 2024	20th	(England) Steve Pitt	5 December 2024
Ebbsfleet United	(England) Harry Watling	Mutual consent	11 December 2024	24th	(England) Josh Wright	11 December 2024
Woking	(Republic of Ireland) Michael Doyle	Sacked	14 December 2024	19th	(England) Neal Ardley	18 December 2024
Dagenham & Redbridge	(England) Ben Strevens	Sacked	26 December 2024	16th	(England) Lewis Young (Note: Young was originally appointed interim manager before being given the role permanently on 16 January 2025)	26 December 2024
Solihull Moors	(England) Andy Whing	Signed by Barrow	20 January 2025	7th	(England) Matthew Taylor	23 January 2025
Wealdstone	(England) Matthew Taylor	Signed by Solihull Moors	23 January 2025	21st	(Wales) Neil Gibson	27 January 2025
Hartlepool United	(England) Lennie Lawrence	Coaching restructure	3 February 2025	12th	(Australia) Anthony Limbrick	3 February 2025
AFC Fylde	(England) Kevin Phillips	Mutual consent	19 February 2025	22nd	(Scotland) David Longwell & (England) Chris Neal (interim)	19 February 2025

=== Table ===
Pos	Team	Pld	W	D	L	GF	GA	GD	Pts	Promotion, qualification or relegation
1	Barnet (C, P)	46	31	9	6	97	38	+59	102	Promotion to EFL League Two
2	York City	46	29	9	8	95	42	+53	96	Qualification for National League play-off semi-finals
3	Forest Green Rovers	46	22	17	7	69	42	+27	83	Qualification for National League play-off semi-finals
4	Rochdale	46	21	11	14	69	44	+25	74	Qualification for the National League play-off quarter-finals
5	Oldham Athletic (O, P)	46	19	16	11	64	48	+16	73	Qualification for the National League play-off quarter-finals
6	FC Halifax Town	46	19	13	14	50	46	+4	70	Qualification for the National League play-off quarter-finals
7	Southend United	46	17	17	12	59	48	+11	68	Qualification for the National League play-off quarter-finals
8	Gateshead	46	19	10	17	76	68	+8	67	
9	Altrincham	46	17	13	16	68	62	+6	64	
10	Tamworth	46	17	13	16	65	72	−7	64	
11	Hartlepool United	46	14	18	14	59	62	−3	60	
12	Sutton United	46	15	15	16	59	64	−5	60	
13	Eastleigh	46	14	17	15	58	61	−3	59	
14	Solihull Moors	46	16	10	20	61	67	−6	58	
15	Woking	46	13	19	14	52	59	−7	58	
16	Aldershot Town	46	14	15	17	69	83	−14	57	
17	Braintree Town	46	15	11	20	51	59	−8	56	
18	Yeovil Town	46	15	11	20	51	60	−9	56	
19	Boston United	46	15	10	21	54	67	−13	55	
20	Wealdstone	46	13	14	19	56	76	−20	53	
21	Dagenham & Redbridge (R)	46	12	16	18	61	62	−1	52	Relegation to National League South
22	Maidenhead United (R)	46	14	10	22	57	75	−18	52	Relegation to National League South
23	AFC Fylde (R)	46	11	7	28	50	85	−35	40	Relegation to National League North
24	Ebbsfleet United (R)	46	3	13	30	38	98	−60	22	Relegation to National League South

Source: National League official site
Rules for classification: 1) Points; 2) Goal difference; 3) Number of goals scored; 4) Number of matches won; 5) Head-to-head results
(C) Champions; (O) Play-off winners; (P) Promoted; (R) Relegated

=== Play-offs ===
Quarter-finals
5	Oldham Athletic	4
6	FC Halifax Town	0
4	Rochdale	3
7	Southend United	4

Semi-finals
2	York City	0
5	Oldham Athletic	3
3	Forest Green Rovers	2 (2)
7	Southend United (p)	2 (4)

Final
5	Oldham Athletic	3
7	Southend United	2

==== Quarter-finals ====
14 May 2025	Oldham Athletic	4–0	FC Halifax Town	Oldham
19:45 BST	Garner 4'; Kitching 10'; Fondop 13'; Pritchard 54'	Report		Stadium: Boundary Park; Attendance: 10,865; Referee: Aaron Bannister

15 May 2025	Rochdale	3–4 (a.e.t.)	Southend United	Rochdale
19:45 BST	Rodney 8', 56' (pen.); Bird 28'	Report	Ralph 22'; Hopper 74'; Parillon 80'; Kendall 101'	Stadium: Spotland Stadium; Attendance: 5,560; Referee: Andrew Humphries

==== Semi-finals ====
20 May 2025	York City	0–3	Oldham Athletic	York
19:45 BST		Report	Garner 23'; Yoganathan 49'; Pritchard 51'	Stadium: York Community Stadium; Attendance: 8,153; Referee: Zac Kennard-Kettle

21 May 2025	Forest Green Rovers	2–2 (a.e.t.) (2–4 p)	Southend United	Nailsworth
19:45 BST	Inniss 62'; Osadebe 94'	Report	Goodliffe 54'; Bridge 116'	Stadium: The New Lawn; Attendance: 3,937; Referee: David Rock
	Penalties
	Cardwell (penalty scored); Knowles (penalty missed); McCann (penalty scored); Sercombe (penalty missed)		(penalty missed) Walker; (penalty scored) Bridge; (penalty scored) Gubbins; (penalty scored) Bonne; (penalty scored) Scott-Moriss

==== Final ====
1 June 2025
15:00 BST

Oldham Athletic	3–2 (a.e.t.)	Southend United
Garner 48' (pen.); Norwood 110'; Harratt 112'	Report	Monthé 5' (o.g.); Chambers-Parillon 91'

Wembley Stadium, London
Attendance: 52,115
Referee: Elliot Bell

=== Results ===
Home \ Away	FYL	ALD	ALT	BAR	BOS	BRA	DAG	EAS	EBB	HAL	FOR	GAT	HAR	MAI	OLD	ROC	SOL	SOU	SUT	TAM	WEA	WOK	YEO	YOR
AFC Fylde	—	5–2	0–5	0–3	1–2	0–2	1–1	2–2	2–0	0–1	3–0	3–0	2–1	0–0	1–2	1–3	3–2	2–1	1–2	1–2	2–0	1–1	3–4	1–3
Aldershot Town	2–0	—	2–1	0–1	1–2	2–2	0–0	2–1	3–3	3–4	3–3	3–1	3–2	4–3	4–1	0–2	3–1	0–0	1–1	2–2	0–2	2–2	2–1	0–0
Altrincham	1–2	1–2	—	0–1	2–2	3–1	2–1	0–1	4–0	0–0	1–1	2–2	1–1	4–0	1–1	1–2	1–1	2–0	1–0	1–1	0–1	1–0	2–1	3–0
Barnet	2–0	4–0	2–1	—	3–1	3–1	1–0	1–1	4–1	1–1	1–0	3–1	2–0	3–0	0–0	2–1	3–1	2–1	3–3	7–0	1–1	2–0	5–0	3–1
Boston United	1–2	1–1	1–0	0–0	—	3–1	1–1	1–2	2–2	0–1	0–4	2–1	1–2	1–2	0–0	0–3	0–1	3–0	2–1	1–1	2–0	2–2	1–3	3–1
Braintree Town	1–0	2–1	2–0	2–1	0–1	—	0–0	1–0	0–0	1–0	2–0	2–2	1–1	1–3	0–2	2–0	1–0	0–1	0–1	0–1	1–2	0–0	0–1	2–1
Dagenham & Redbridge	4–0	3–2	6–1	3–4	1–3	2–4	—	2–2	1–0	1–1	0–2	7–1	1–1	1–0	2–2	1–0	1–1	0–2	3–0	1–3	2–1	1–2	1–1	0–2
Eastleigh	4–2	2–0	1–2	1–1	1–1	1–2	3–0	—	2–0	1–1	1–3	1–1	1–1	1–0	2–2	4–2	2–1	1–2	1–1	1–0	1–1	2–2	1–0	0–2
Ebbsfleet United	1–0	0–0	2–2	1–2	0–0	0–1	0–2	0–1	—	0–1	0–0	1–4	1–0	0–2	1–2	2–2	0–6	0–4	4–1	2–3	2–2	0–3	1–1	0–2
FC Halifax Town	1–2	0–1	0–3	2–1	1–0	1–0	0–1	3–1	2–0	—	2–1	1–1	0–1	0–2	1–1	0–0	0–1	0–2	0–0	3–2	2–2	1–0	1–0	1–2
Forest Green Rovers	3–0	1–1	2–1	0–0	1–0	2–1	1–1	2–1	3–1	1–1	—	2–3	1–0	2–0	1–0	1–0	1–0	2–2	2–1	3–0	2–2	1–1	2–1	2–0
Gateshead	1–1	2–2	0–1	2–0	2–0	1–3	2–1	2–1	5–1	1–3	0–2	—	4–3	0–2	1–1	0–1	1–0	0–0	4–3	0–2	1–0	4–0	3–1	1–3
Hartlepool United	2–0	2–0	1–2	0–0	4–1	0–0	0–1	0–0	3–2	0–0	1–1	3–2	—	0–0	2–1	0–3	1–1	0–0	4–3	2–2	1–1	1–1	2–1	0–1
Maidenhead United	4–1	0–1	0–1	3–1	3–0	3–3	1–1	0–2	2–1	0–1	1–4	0–5	1–1	—	2–2	1–1	1–1	1–0	0–1	3–1	3–1	2–2	0–2	1–3
Oldham Athletic	1–1	1–3	2–2	0–3	4–0	3–0	1–0	2–0	2–0	2–0	1–0	1–1	2–1	0–1	—	1–1	2–3	1–1	0–0	4–0	3–2	1–2	1–0	0–2
Rochdale	0–0	4–0	3–0	0–4	2–3	1–0	1–1	4–0	0–0	2–1	0–0	1–0	5–1	3–1	0–1	—	1–2	0–1	2–1	3–0	4–1	3–0	4–0	0–4
Solihull Moors	4–1	2–1	3–3	4–3	3–2	1–1	1–1	0–1	2–1	0–2	0–1	1–3	3–4	2–1	0–1	0–1	—	2–4	1–1	2–0	1–1	2–1	0–3	0–3
Southend United	2–0	2–1	2–1	0–3	2–0	0–0	2–2	2–0	4–0	3–1	2–2	1–3	0–0	0–2	1–0	1–1	0–1	—	1–3	2–0	3–0	2–2	0–1	1–1
Sutton United	2–0	1–1	5–0	1–3	0–3	1–1	1–1	1–0	3–2	0–3	1–2	0–1	1–2	1–0	1–3	1–0	1–0	1–1	—	1–2	2–2	1–1	0–0	2–2
Tamworth	4–3	3–2	1–2	0–1	3–0	4–2	2–1	2–0	1–1	1–2	1–1	2–1	0–1	3–1	1–1	1–1	1–2	1–1	1–1	—	4–1	3–2	0–0	1–1
Wealdstone	1–0	1–3	3–3	0–3	1–0	3–2	3–0	3–3	4–2	3–1	2–1	0–4	1–1	1–1	0–1	2–0	1–1	1–1	0–1	0–1	—	1–0	0–3	0–2
Woking	1–0	3–0	2–1	0–1	1–0	2–1	1–0	2–2	1–1	0–0	1–1	0–2	3–2	3–1	1–3	1–1	1–0	0–0	1–2	1–1	1–0	—	0–2	1–1
Yeovil Town	1–0	1–1	0–0	1–2	0–3	3–1	1–0	2–2	3–2	0–1	1–1	0–0	0–1	3–1	2–1	0–1	0–1	2–2	1–2	2–1	1–2	1–1	—	0–1
York City	3–0	7–2	1–2	3–1	0–2	2–1	2–1	0–0	4–0	2–2	1–1	1–0	5–3	6–2	1–1	1–0	2–0	3–0	1–2	2–0	3–0	3–0	4–0	—

Legend: Blue = home team win; Yellow = draw; Red = away team win.
For upcoming matches, an "a" indicates there is an article about the rivalry between the two participants.

=== Season statistics ===
As of 5 May 2025

=== Top scorers ===
Rank	Player	Club	Goals
1	(England) Ollie Pearce	York City	31
2	(England) Regan Linney	Altrincham	23
3	(England) Dan Creaney	Tamworth	19
3	(England) Nick Haughton	AFC Fylde	19
5	(England) Will Davies	Sutton United	18
5	(England) Callum Stead	Barnet	18
7	(England) Emmanuel Dieseruvwe	Hartlepool United	17
7	(Cameroon) Mike Fondop Talum	Oldham Athletic	17
7	(England) Devante Rodney	Rochdale	17
7	(England) Gus Scott-Morriss	Southend United	17

=== Hat-tricks ===
Player	For	Against	Result	Date
(England) Nick Haughton	AFC Fylde	Solihull Moors	3–2	10 August 2024
(England) Greg Olley	Gateshead	Ebbsfleet United	5–1	10 August 2024
(England) Zak Brunt	Barnet	Tamworth	7–0	31 August 2024
(England) Emmanuel Dieseruvwe	Hartlepool United	Sutton United	4–3	5 October 2024
(England) Regan Linney	Altrincham	AFC Fylde	0–5	26 October 2024
(England) James Norwood	Oldham Athletic	Tamworth	4–0	16 November 2024
(Republic of Ireland) Conor Wilkinson	Solihull Moors	Ebbsfleet United	0–6	16 November 2024
(England) Ollie Pearce	York City	Yeovil Town	4–0	23 November 2024
(England) Alex Newby	Altrincham	Maidenhead United	4–0	14 January 2025
(Republic of Ireland) Josh Barrett	Aldershot Town	Oldham Athletic	1–3	18 January 2025
(England) Josh Stones	York City	Woking	3–0	8 February 2025
(England) Ollie Pearce	York City	Aldershot Town	7–2	12 April 2025

=== Monthly awards ===
Each month the Vanarama National League announces their official Player of the Month and Manager of the Month.

Month	Manager of the Month		Player of the Month		Reference
August	(Republic of Ireland) Rob Elliot	Gateshead	(England) James Henry	Aldershot Town	
September	(England) Adam Hinshelwood	York City	(Grenada) Kairo Mitchell	Rochdale	
October	(England) Adam Hinshelwood	York City	(Scotland) Kyle McAllister	Forest Green Rovers	
November	(Republic of Ireland) Dean Brennan	Barnet	(England) Ollie Pearce	York City	
December	(Northern Ireland) Carl Magnay	Gateshead	(Republic of Ireland) Conor Wilkinson	Solihull Moors	
January	(Republic of Ireland) Dean Brennan	Barnet	(England) Will Davies	Sutton United	
February	(Republic of Ireland) Dean Brennan	Barnet	(England) Jovan Malcolm	Gateshead	
March	(Republic of Ireland) Graham Coughlan	Boston United	(England) Dan Creaney	Tamworth	
April	(England) Neal Ardley	Woking	(England) Ben Goodliffe	Southend United	

=== Annual awards ===
Award	Winner	Club	Ref.
Player of the Season	(England) Ollie Pearce	York City	
Manager of the Season	(Republic of Ireland) Dean Brennan	Barnet	

National League Team of the Season

Pos.	Player	Club	Ref.
GK	(England) Harrison Male	York City	
RB	(England) Gus Scott-Morriss	Southend United	
CB	(England) Callum Howe	York City	
CB	(England) Danny Collinge	Barnet	
LB	(England) Sam Beckwith	Rochdale	
CM	(England) Anthony Hartigan	Barnet	
CM	(Scotland) Kyle McAllister	Forest Green Rovers	
AM	(England) Nick Haughton	AFC Fylde	
RW	(England) Ollie Pearce	York City	
CF	(England) Regan Linney	Altrincham	
LW	(England) Callum Stead	Barnet	

== National League North ==
National League North
- Season: 2024–25
- Champions: Brackley Town
- Promoted: Brackley Town; Scunthorpe United
- Relegated: Needham Market; Rushall Olympic; Warrington Town; Farsley Celtic
- Matches: 552
- Goals: 1,327 (2.4 per match)
- Top goalscorer: (England) Ashley Hemmings (30 goals)
- Biggest home win: South Shields 7–0 Rushall Olympic, 10 December 2024 Spennymoor Town 7–0 Rushall Olympic, 18 January 2025
- Biggest away win: Oxford City 0–7 Buxton, 8 March 2025
- Longest winning run: 7 matches Chester
- Longest unbeaten run: 13 matches Scunthorpe United
- Longest winless run: 21 matches Farsley Celtic
- Longest losing run: 16 matches Farsley Celtic
- All statistics correct as of 23:57, 19 May 2025.

The National League North consists of 24 teams.

=== Team changes ===
To National League North

Relegated from the National League

- Kidderminster Harriers
- Oxford City

Promoted from the Northern Premier League Premier Division

- Radcliffe
- Marine

Promoted from the Southern League Premier Division Central

- Needham Market
- Leamington

From National League North

Promoted to the National League

- Tamworth
- Boston United

Relegated to the Northern Premier League Premier Division

- Blyth Spartans

Relegated to the Southern League Premier Division Central

- Banbury United
- Bishop's Stortford

Relegated to the Southern League Premier Division South

- Gloucester City

=== Stadiums and locations ===
Locations of the National League North 2024–25 teams

Team	Location	Stadium	Capacity
Alfreton Town	Alfreton	Impact Arena	3,600
Brackley Town	Brackley	St. James Park	3,500
Buxton	Buxton	The Silverlands	5,200
Chester	Chester	Deva Stadium	6,500
Chorley	Chorley	Victory Park	4,100
Curzon Ashton	Ashton-under-Lyne	Tameside Stadium	4,000
Darlington	Darlington	Blackwell Meadows	3,300
Farsley Celtic	Farsley	The Citadel	3,900
Hereford	Hereford	Edgar Street	5,250
Kidderminster Harriers	Kidderminster	Aggborough	6,238
King's Lynn Town	King's Lynn	The Walks	8,200
Leamington	Leamington	Your Co-Op Community Stadium	3,050
Marine	Crosby	Marine Travel Arena	2,200
Needham Market	Needham Market	Bloomfields	4,000
Oxford City	Oxford (Marston)	RAW Charging Stadium	3,500
Peterborough Sports	Peterborough	Lincoln Road	2,300
Radcliffe	Radcliffe	Stainton Park	3,500
Rushall Olympic	Walsall (Rushall)	Dales Lane	2,000
Scarborough Athletic	Scarborough	Flamingo Land Stadium	2,833
Scunthorpe United	Scunthorpe	Glanford Park	9,088
South Shields	South Shields	1st Cloud Arena	4,000
Southport	Southport	Haig Avenue	6,008
Spennymoor Town	Spennymoor	The Brewery Field	4,300
Warrington Town	Warrington	Cantilever Park	3,500

=== Managerial changes ===
Team	Outgoing manager	Manner of departure	Date of vacancy	Position in table	Incoming manager	Date of appointment
Buxton	(England) Craig Elliott	Resigned	20 April 2024	Pre-season	(Republic of Ireland) John McGrath	6 May 2024
Scunthorpe United	(England) Jimmy Dean	Sacked	2 May 2024	Pre-season	(England) Andy Butler	3 May 2024
Rushall Olympic	(England) Liam McDonald	Resigned	13 May 2024	Pre-season	(England) Adam Stevens	16 May 2024
Oxford City	(England) Ross Jenkins	Mutual consent	15 May 2024	Pre-season	(Guyana) Sam Cox	18 June 2024
Farsley Celtic	(Jamaica) Clayton Donaldson	Sacked	2 September 2024	10th	(England) Pav Singh	2 September 2024
Warrington Town	(England) Mark Beesley	Resigned	15 September 2024	18th	(England) Paul Carden	21 September 2024
Oxford City	(Guyana) Sam Cox	Sacked	27 September 2024	23rd	(England) Ross Jenkins	27 September 2024
Rushall Olympic	(England) Adam Stevens	Sacked	1 December 2024	24th	(Netherlands) Richard Sneekes	18 December 2024
Farsley Celtic	(England) Pav Singh	Resigned	11 January 2025	20th	(England) Neil Redfearn	17 January 2025
Needham Market	(Northern Ireland) Kevin Horlock	Resigned	1 February 2025	24th	(England) Tom Rothery	1 February 2025
Farsley Celtic	(England) Neil Redfearn	Resigned	6 February 2025	22nd	(England) David Stockdale	13 February 2025
Southport	(England) Jim Bentley	Sacked	12 March 2025	17th	(Northern Ireland) David Morgan (Interim)	12 March 2025

=== Table ===
Pos	Team	Pld	W	D	L	GF	GA	GD	Pts	Promotion, qualification or relegation
1	Brackley Town (C, P)	46	29	5	12	75	42	+33	92	Promotion to National League
2	Scunthorpe United (O, P)	46	26	12	8	76	30	+46	90	Qualification for the National League North play-off semi-finals
3	Kidderminster Harriers	46	27	8	11	86	37	+49	89	Qualification for the National League North play-off semi-finals
4	Chester	46	25	12	9	73	45	+28	87	Qualification for the National League North play-off quarter-finals
5	Chorley	46	22	13	11	76	49	+27	79	Qualification for the National League North play-off quarter-finals
6	King's Lynn Town	46	23	10	13	52	45	+7	79	Qualification for the National League North play-off quarter-finals
7	Buxton	46	24	5	17	76	52	+24	77	Qualification for the National League North play-off quarter-finals
8	Curzon Ashton	46	22	11	13	59	41	+18	77	
9	Spennymoor Town	46	21	13	12	76	50	+26	76	
10	Hereford	46	22	10	14	68	51	+17	76	
11	Darlington	46	18	15	13	61	54	+7	69	
12	Peterborough Sports	46	17	12	17	55	57	−2	63	
13	Scarborough Athletic	46	16	13	17	64	58	+6	61	
14	Alfreton Town	46	15	14	17	54	59	−5	59	
15	Marine	46	16	10	20	45	57	−12	58	
16	Leamington	46	15	10	21	52	56	−4	55	
17	South Shields	46	16	6	24	60	73	−13	54	
18	Southport	46	13	14	19	43	58	−15	53	
19	Oxford City	46	13	14	19	58	74	−16	53	
20	Radcliffe	46	13	12	21	56	75	−19	51	
21	Needham Market (R)	46	10	9	27	44	76	−32	39	Relegation to the Southern League Premier Division Central
22	Rushall Olympic (R)	46	9	8	29	42	98	−56	35	Relegation to the Northern Premier League Premier Division
23	Warrington Town (R)	46	6	13	27	34	70	−36	31	Relegation to the Northern Premier League Premier Division
24	Farsley Celtic (R)	46	7	5	34	35	113	−78	26	Relegation to the Northern Counties East League Premier Division (Note: Farsley Celtic were not granted a FA license to participate in steps 1-4 for 2025-26, thus were relegated to the Northern Counties East League)

Source: National League official site
Rules for classification: 1) Points; 2) Goal difference; 3) Number of goals scored; 4) Number of matches won; 5) Head-to-head results
(C) Champions; (O) Play-off winners; (P) Promoted; (R) Relegated

=== Results ===
Home \ Away	ALF	BRA	BUX	CHE	CHO	CUR	DAR	FAR	HER	KID	KIN	LEA	MAR	NEE	OXF	PET	RAD	RUS	SCA	SCU	SOU	SPT	SPE	WAR
Alfreton Town	—	3–4	3–2	2–2	1–0	0–1	1–1	2–1	0–0	0–2	3–0	1–0	1–0	2–3	1–1	2–0	2–1	1–1	1–1	0–2	2–4	0–2	0–1	2–2
Brackley Town	2–0	—	0–1	2–1	0–2	4–0	2–1	5–0	1–2	0–1	0–1	2–1	1–0	2–1	1–0	1–0	0–1	6–1	2–0	0–3	1–0	1–0	4–1	0–0
Buxton	3–2	0–2	—	2–4	1–0	0–1	2–0	2–1	1–2	1–1	0–1	2–1	1–2	7–1	2–1	1–3	0–1	2–0	2–0	1–1	1–0	2–1	1–0	2–0
Chester	2–0	0–1	0–1	—	2–1	1–1	2–1	0–0	3–0	1–1	1–1	1–0	2–1	1–1	3–1	3–0	2–0	4–0	3–2	0–0	1–0	0–0	1–0	3–1
Chorley	2–0	4–1	3–0	3–2	—	0–3	3–0	4–0	1–1	2–1	2–1	2–1	0–0	1–0	0–0	0–0	5–0	2–1	1–2	2–2	2–1	4–1	4–0	1–1
Curzon Ashton	0–0	0–1	1–0	4–0	3–0	—	0–0	1–3	1–2	0–1	0–1	1–1	0–1	3–0	1–0	1–1	1–1	1–1	2–1	0–1	3–0	1–0	0–3	1–0
Darlington	0–0	2–4	0–1	1–0	1–1	0–0	—	4–2	2–1	1–2	1–0	1–0	3–1	3–1	1–1	2–2	2–1	2–2	4–3	0–0	1–1	3–0	1–0	2–2
Farsley Celtic	1–4	1–1	1–2	0–1	0–1	0–3	0–2	—	0–4	0–6	1–3	0–1	1–1	1–6	1–3	3–0	1–2	1–2	0–5	0–2	1–3	0–2	0–3	0–0
Hereford	2–0	3–2	2–1	2–2	1–0	3–1	0–2	3–0	—	0–3	0–0	3–0	4–0	0–1	0–2	1–1	3–3	3–0	1–0	0–1	3–0	1–1	0–2	3–2
Kidderminster Harriers	0–1	1–0	2–2	1–1	1–2	3–0	0–1	1–0	5–1	—	2–0	1–0	0–0	4–1	4–0	3–0	3–0	0–1	3–0	1–0	4–0	2–0	1–3	2–0
King's Lynn Town	0–0	0–0	2–0	0–3	0–0	0–2	2–1	0–2	0–2	4–0	—	0–0	3–1	2–2	2–1	1–2	1–1	2–1	1–0	1–0	3–1	1–0	0–3	3–1
Leamington	2–2	0–2	1–1	1–4	3–2	4–1	2–1	3–0	2–1	1–1	0–1	—	0–2	0–1	4–1	2–1	0–0	2–1	1–1	0–2	2–0	3–0	3–1	2–0
Marine	0–0	1–2	1–4	2–3	3–0	0–2	0–0	0–3	2–2	3–1	0–1	0–0	—	2–0	1–1	2–1	1–0	3–1	0–1	1–2	4–1	1–0	2–2	1–0
Needham Market	0–2	1–3	1–2	0–1	2–1	2–3	0–1	0–1	0–0	0–3	0–1	1–1	0–1	—	4–0	1–2	1–1	1–0	1–1	0–1	3–0	1–2	1–1	2–1
Oxford City	1–2	0–2	0–7	0–0	2–2	0–5	2–2	4–1	1–2	1–1	1–3	1–2	1–0	3–0	—	1–3	1–0	3–1	1–1	0–0	1–4	1–1	3–0	4–0
Peterborough Sports	3–1	0–2	1–0	0–1	0–1	1–1	4–1	2–0	0–1	0–1	3–1	2–0	2–0	2–0	2–1	—	1–1	0–2	1–1	0–1	0–2	1–1	1–1	3–1
Radcliffe	1–1	1–2	0–2	0–3	2–0	1–2	1–4	3–0	3–2	0–4	1–2	2–1	0–1	1–1	1–3	1–3	—	3–1	3–3	1–0	4–1	4–1	2–4	1–2
Rushall Olympic	1–3	0–1	1–5	1–2	1–5	1–2	1–1	2–3	1–0	1–2	0–0	2–1	2–0	1–1	1–2	0–1	1–1	—	1–2	2–1	2–1	0–2	2–1	1–1
Scarborough Athletic	0–2	2–1	0–3	2–4	2–3	0–2	1–0	2–1	1–0	2–3	0–0	3–0	4–1	5–0	0–0	1–1	2–0	3–0	—	1–0	1–2	1–2	1–1	0–0
Scunthorpe United	0–0	3–2	2–3	3–1	1–1	1–1	2–0	6–0	0–0	2–0	3–0	1–0	3–0	2–0	2–2	5–0	0–0	3–0	2–1	—	3–2	2–0	2–0	1–1
South Shields	2–1	0–1	1–0	2–0	3–3	1–2	0–1	5–1	0–1	0–5	2–1	1–0	2–0	1–0	1–2	2–2	0–1	7–0	1–1	0–2	—	0–0	0–2	2–1
Southport	3–1	0–0	3–2	0–1	0–0	1–0	0–0	1–1	1–4	2–1	0–2	0–2	0–0	0–0	2–2	1–2	2–2	2–0	0–1	3–2	3–0	—	1–4	2–0
Spennymoor Town	3–1	2–2	1–1	3–0	1–2	0–0	2–1	4–0	0–0	1–1	1–2	2–1	0–1	1–0	1–0	1–1	3–2	7–0	1–1	3–2	1–1	2–0	—	2–0
Warrington Town	0–1	1–2	1–0	1–1	1–1	0–1	2–3	1–2	2–0	2–1	1–2	1–1	0–2	1–2	0–2	1–0	0–1	2–0	0–2	0–2	0–3	0–0	1–1	—

Source: National League North Results Grid
Legend: Blue = home team win; Yellow = draw; Red = away team win.
For upcoming matches, an "a" indicates there is an article about the rivalry between the two participants.

=== Play-offs ===
Quarter-finals
5	Chorley	1
6	King's Lynn Town	0
4	Chester	2
7	Buxton	1

Semi-finals
2	Scunthorpe United	4
5	Chorley	2
3	Kidderminster Harriers	1
4	Chester	2

Final
2	Scunthorpe United	2
4	Chester	1

==== Quarter-finals ====
29 April 2025	Chorley	1–0	King's Lynn Town	Chorley
19:45 BST	Ellis 84'	Report		Stadium: Victory Park; Attendance: 2,665

30 April 2025	Chester	2–1 (a.e.t.)	Buxton	Chester
19:45 BST	Murray 3'; Burke 108'		Elliott 18'	Stadium: Deva Stadium; Attendance: 4,066

==== Semi-finals ====
3 May 2025	Scunthorpe United	4–2	Chorley	Scunthorpe
15:00 BST	Whitehall 5', 22'; Roberts 36'; Ubaezuonu 66'	Report	Hall 7', 78'	Stadium: Glanford Park; Attendance: 6,365

4 May 2025	Kidderminster Harriers	1–2	Chester	Kidderminster
15:00 BST	Morrison 19'	Report	Mottley-Henry 35'; Weeks 82'	Stadium: Aggborough Stadium; Attendance: 4,647

==== Final ====
18 May 2025	Scunthorpe United	2–1 (a.e.t.)	Chester	Scunthorpe
16:00 BST	Whitehall 20'; Ubaezuonu 105+1'	Report	Woods 62' (pen.)	Stadium: Glanford Park; Attendance: 9,086; Referee: Isaac Searle

=== Season statistics ===
As of 26 April 2025

=== Top scorers ===
Rank	Player	Club	Goals
1	(England) Ashley Hemmings	Kidderminster Harriers	30
2	(England) Paul Blackett	South Shields	23
3	(England) Callum Roberts	Scunthorpe United	20
4	(England) Tom Peers	Chester	19
5	(England) Connor Hall	Brackley Town	18
5	(England) Glen Taylor	Spennymoor Town	18
7	(Germany) Michael Gyasi	Peterborough Sports	16
8	(Wales) Charlie Caton	Chester	14
8	(England) Callum Stewart	Leamington	14
8	(England) Danny Whitehall	Scunthorpe United	14

=== Hat-tricks ===
Player	For	Against	Result	Date
(England) Callum Stewart	Leamington	Oxford City	4–1	24 September 2024
(England) Tom Elliott	Buxton	Needham Market	7–1	26 October 2024
(Germany) Michael Gyasi	Peterborough Sports	Alfreton Town	3–1	5 November 2024
(Republic of Ireland) Cian Coleman	Buxton	Scunthorpe United	2–3	9 November 2024
(England) Tom Peers	Chester	Oxford City	3–1	26 November 2024
(England) Paul Blackett	South Shields	Rushall Olympic	7–0	10 December 2024
(England) Callum Stewart	Leamington	Curzon Ashton	4–1	21 December 2024
(England) Corey McKeown	Spennymoor Town	Rushall Olympic	7–0	18 January 2025
(England) Glen Taylor	Spennymoor Town	Rushall Olympic	7–0	18 January 2025
(England) Tom Carr	Chorley	Farsley Celtic	4–0	25 February 2025
(England) Ashley Hemmings	Kidderminster Harriers	South Shields	0–5	15 March 2025
(England) Ashley Hemmings	Kidderminster Harriers	Needham Market	4–1	22 March 2025
(England) Glen Taylor	Spennymoor Town	Radcliffe	3–2	25 March 2025
(England) Stephen Walker	Scarborough Athletic	Marine	4–1	5 April 2025

=== Monthly awards ===
Each month the Vanarama National League announces their official Player of the Month and Manager of the Month.

Month	Manager of the Month		Player of the Month		Reference
August	(England) Andy Butler	Scunthorpe United	(Wales) Charlie Caton	Chester	
September	(England) Paul Holleran	Leamington	(England) Isaac Fletcher	Spennymoor Town	
October	(Republic of Ireland) Craig Mahon	Curzon Ashton	(England) Callum Roberts	Scunthorpe United	
November	(England) Phil Brown	Kidderminster Harriers	(England) Harrison Burke	Chester	
December	(England) Steve Watson	Darlington	(England) Amari Morgan-Smith	Kidderminster Harriers	
January	(England) Calum McIntyre	Chester	(England) Connor Hall	Brackley Town	
February	(Scotland) Paul Caddis	Hereford	(England) Mark Ellis	Chorley	
March	(England) Phil Brown	Kidderminster Harriers	(England) Ashley Hemmings	Kidderminster Harriers	
April	(England) Gavin Cowan	Brackley Town	(England) Kieran Burton	Buxton	

=== Annual awards ===
Award	Winner	Club	Ref.
Player of the Season	(England) Ashley Hemmings	Kidderminster Harriers	
Manager of the Season	(England) Gavin Cowan	Brackley Town	

National League North Team of the Season

Pos.	Player	Club	Ref.
GK	(England) Ross Fitzsimons	Scunthorpe United	
RB	(England) George Carline	Brackley Town	
CB	(England) Mark Ellis	Chorley	
CB	(England) Harrison Burke	Chester	
LB	(England) Adam Blakeman	Chorley	
CM	(Wales) Declan Weeks	Chester	
CM	(Wales) Morgan Roberts	Brackley Town	
AM	(England) Luke Brennan	Buxton	
RW	(England) Ashley Hemmings	Kidderminster Harriers	
CF	(England) Paul Blackett	South Shields	
LW	(England) Callum Roberts	Scunthorpe United	

== National League South ==
National League South
- Season: 2024–25
- Dates: 10 August 2024 – 26 April 2025
- Champions: Truro City
- Promoted: Truro City; Boreham Wood
- Relegated: St Albans City; Welling United; Weymouth; Aveley
- Matches: 552
- Top goalscorer: (England): Tyler Harvey (27)
- Biggest home win: Boreham Wood 6–0 Welling United, 21 September 2024
- Biggest away win: Hemel Hempstead Town 1–7 Dorking Wanderers, 25 September 2024 Hampton & Richmond Borough 2–8 Farnborough, 21 April 2025
- Highest scoring: Hampton & Richmond Borough 2–8 Farnborough, 21 April 2025
- Longest winning run: 8 matches Maidstone United
- Longest unbeaten run: 13 matches Maidstone United
- Longest winless run: 15 matches Weymouth
- Longest losing run: 8 matches Hemel Hempstead

The National League South also consists of 24 teams.

=== Team changes ===
To National League South

Relegated from the National League

- Boreham Wood
- Dorking Wanderers

Promoted from the Isthmian League Premier Division

- Hornchurch
- Enfield Town

Promoted from the Southern League Premier Division South

- Chesham United
- Salisbury

From National League South

Promoted to the National League

- Yeovil Town
- Braintree Town

Relegated to the Isthmian League Premier Division

- Dartford
- Dover Athletic

Relegated to the Southern League Premier Division South

- Taunton Town
- Havant & Waterlooville

=== Stadia and locations ===
Locations of the National League South 2024–25 teams (Greater London shown in more detail below)
Locations of the National League South 2023–24 teams (Greater London clubs)

Team	Location	Stadium	Capacity
Aveley	Aveley	Parkside	3,500
Bath City	Bath (Twerton)	Twerton Park	8,840
Boreham Wood	Borehamwood	Meadow Park	4,502
Chelmsford City	Chelmsford	Melbourne Stadium	3,019
Chesham United	Chesham	The Meadow	5,000
Chippenham Town	Chippenham	Hardenhuish Park	3,000
Dorking Wanderers	Dorking	Meadowbank Stadium	4,250
Eastbourne Borough	Eastbourne	Priory Lane	4,151
Enfield Town	London (Enfield)	Queen Elizabeth II Stadium	2,500
Farnborough	Farnborough	Cherrywood Road	7,000
Hampton & Richmond Borough	London (Hampton)	Beveree Stadium	3,500
Hemel Hempstead Town	Hemel Hempstead	Vauxhall Road	3,152
Hornchurch	London (Upminster)	Hornchurch Stadium	3,500
Maidstone United	Maidstone	Gallagher Stadium	4,200
Salisbury	Salisbury	Raymond McEnhill Stadium	5,000
Slough Town	Slough	Arbour Park	2,000
St Albans City	St Albans	Clarence Park	4,500
Tonbridge Angels	Tonbridge	Longmead Stadium	3,000
Torquay United	Torquay	Plainmoor	6,500
Truro City	Truro	Truro City Stadium	3,000
Welling United	London (Welling)	Park View Road	4,000
Weston-super-Mare	Weston-super-Mare	Woodspring Stadium	3,500
Weymouth	Weymouth	Bob Lucas Stadium	6,600
Worthing	Worthing	Woodside Road	4,000

=== Managerial changes ===
Team	Outgoing manager	Manner of departure	Date of vacancy	Position in table	Incoming manager(s)	Date of appointment
Boreham Wood	(England) Luke Garrard	Mutual consent	20 April 2024	Pre-season	(England) Ross Jenkins	15 May 2024
Torquay United	(Australia) Aaron Downes	End of interim spell	20 April 2024	Pre-season	(England) Paul Wotton	14 May 2024
Hampton & Richmond Borough	(England) Mel Gwinnett	Sacked	3 May 2024	Pre-season	(Northern Ireland) Alan Julian	13 May 2024
Worthing	(England) Aarran Racine	End of interim spell	11 May 2024	Pre-season	(England) Chris Agutter	11 May 2024
Truro City	(England) Paul Wotton	Signed by Torquay United	14 May 2024	Pre-season	(England) John Askey	6 June 2024
St Albans City	(England) Jon Meakes	Demoted to assistant manager	17 May 2024	Pre-season	(England) David Noble	17 May 2024
Boreham Wood	(England) Ross Jenkins	Sacked	12 September 2024	10th	(England) Luke Garrard	13 September 2024
Bath City	(England) Jerry Gill	Sacked	18 November 2024	20th	(England) Darren Way	23 December 2024
St Albans City	(England) David Noble	Mutual consent	21 November 2024	21st	(England) Ian Culverhouse	28 November 2024
Weymouth	(England) Mark Molesley	Sacked	28 November 2024	23rd	(Northern Ireland) Warren Feeney	17 December 2024
Hemel Hempstead Town	(England) Bobby Wilkinson	Sacked	6 December 2024	17th	(England) Lee Allinson	6 December 2024
Welling United	(England) Rod Stringer	Resigned	16 March 2025	22nd	(England) Brian Statham (interim)	16 March 2025
Tonbridge Angels	(England) Jay Saunders	Mutual consent	31 March 2025	10th	(England) Scott Wagstaff (interim)	31 March 2025

=== Table ===
Pos	Team	Pld	W	D	L	GF	GA	GD	Pts	Promotion, qualification or relegation
1	Truro City (C, P)	46	26	11	9	75	42	+33	89	Promotion to National League
2	Torquay United	46	25	14	7	73	42	+31	89	Qualification for the National League South play-off semi-finals
3	Eastbourne Borough	46	25	13	8	70	43	+27	88	Qualification for the National League South play-off semi-finals
4	Worthing	46	26	10	10	78	58	+20	88	Qualification for the National League South play-off quarter-finals
5	Boreham Wood (O, P)	46	26	8	12	86	48	+38	86	Qualification for the National League South play-off quarter-finals
6	Dorking Wanderers	46	24	14	8	89	54	+35	86	Qualification for the National League South play-off quarter-finals
7	Maidstone United	46	21	16	9	70	38	+32	79	Qualification for the National League South play-off quarter-finals
8	Weston-super-Mare	46	21	12	13	67	54	+13	75	
9	Hornchurch	46	17	14	15	59	54	+5	65	
10	Farnborough	46	18	9	19	69	68	+1	63	
11	Chelmsford City	46	16	14	16	74	62	+12	62	
12	Hemel Hempstead Town	46	17	11	18	64	75	−11	62	
13	Chesham United	46	16	11	19	61	72	−11	59	
14	Chippenham Town	46	17	8	21	57	69	−12	59	
15	Bath City	46	15	12	19	47	48	−1	57	
16	Slough Town	46	15	12	19	70	75	−5	57	
17	Tonbridge Angels	46	15	12	19	51	61	−10	57	
18	Hampton & Richmond Borough	46	14	9	23	60	74	−14	51	
19	Enfield Town	46	13	9	24	49	88	−39	48	
20	Salisbury	46	10	16	20	56	69	−13	46	
21	St Albans City (R)	46	9	18	19	47	64	−17	45	Relegation to the Isthmian League Premier Division
22	Welling United (R)	46	10	8	28	47	91	−44	38	Relegation to the Isthmian League Premier Division
23	Weymouth (R)	46	6	15	25	43	77	−34	33	Relegation to the Southern League Premier Division South
24	Aveley (R)	46	8	8	30	45	81	−36	32	Relegation to the Isthmian League Premier Division

Source: National League official site
Rules for classification: 1) Points; 2) Goal difference; 3) Number of goals scored; 4) Number of matches won; 5) Head-to-head results
(C) Champions; (O) Play-off winners; (P) Promoted; (R) Relegated

=== Play-offs ===
Quarter-finals
5	Boreham Wood	4
6	Dorking Wanderers	3
4	Worthing	0
7	Maidstone United	2

Semi-finals
2	Torquay United	0
5	Boreham Wood	1
3	Eastbourne Borough	1
7	Maidstone United	2

Final
5	Boreham Wood	1
7	Maidstone United	0

==== Quarter-finals ====
29 April 2025	Boreham Wood	4–3	Dorking Wanderers	Borehamwood
19:45 BST	Sousa 16'; Abdulmalik 84'; Coxe 90'; Ilesanmi 90+6'	Report	Ilesanmi 54' (o.g.); Prior 61'; Bush 81' (o.g.)	Stadium: Meadow Park; Attendance: 1,648; Referee: Niall Smith; Assistant referees: Nick Blogg & Thomas Berry; Fourth official: Daniel Baines

30 April 2025	Worthing	0–2	Maidstone United	Worthing
19:45 BST		Report	Brookes 15' (pen.), 90+5' (pen.)	Stadium: Woodside Road; Attendance: 2,983; Referee: Adam Merchant; Assistant referees: Nicoleta Bria & Mitchell Cartwright; Fourth official: George Laflin

==== Semi-finals ====
3 May 2025	Torquay United	0–1	Boreham Wood	Torquay
15:00 BST			Rush 59'	Stadium: Plainmoor; Attendance: 5,721; Referee: Phillip Eddie; Assistant referees: Thomas Holden & Thomas Green; Fourth official: Lewis Sandoe

4 May 2025	Eastbourne Borough	1–2	Maidstone United	Eastbourne
15:00 BST	Pavey 63'		Berkeley-Agyepong 42'; Blair 90'	Stadium: Priory Lane; Attendance: 3,194; Referee: Matthew Scholes; Assistant referees: Joseph Karram & Oliver Potter; Fourth official: Jack Bloxham

==== Final ====
18 May 2025	Boreham Wood	1–0	Maidstone United	Borehamwood
12:30 BST	Clayden 47'	Report		Stadium: Meadow Park; Attendance: 3,500; Referee: Gareth Thomas; Assistant referees: Joseph Larkin & Christopher Poole; Fourth official: Steven Hughes

=== Results ===
Home \ Away	AVE	BAT	BOR	CHL	CHS	CHI	DOR	EAS	ENF	FAR	HAM	HEM	HOR	MAI	SAL	SLO	STA	TON	TOR	TRU	WEL	WSM	WEY	WOR
Aveley	—	2–2	1–0	1–0	1–1	0–1	3–1	0–2	0–1	2–1	1–2	0–1	1–1	0–3	2–2	0–3	6–3	2–2	0–1	1–2	1–1	1–2	0–1	1–2
Bath City	3–0	—	1–2	2–1	1–1	0–1	2–2	0–0	0–1	1–0	1–0	0–0	0–2	3–3	1–0	2–0	0–1	2–0	1–2	1–0	1–0	0–2	1–1	0–2
Boreham Wood	1–0	1–0	—	1–0	3–0	1–4	0–1	3–0	4–1	3–1	3–1	3–0	1–1	1–1	3–0	5–1	3–0	1–1	0–0	1–0	6–0	0–1	3–0	1–2
Chelmsford City	1–0	3–0	2–3	—	1–1	1–1	0–4	4–2	1–2	1–2	1–1	0–0	2–1	0–0	2–1	3–1	2–1	1–1	3–2	0–0	5–1	0–1	0–0	1–2
Chesham United	3–2	0–1	1–2	2–2	—	3–1	0–5	0–0	1–3	2–1	2–1	1–0	1–3	2–0	2–2	2–3	1–0	0–1	2–3	1–4	4–1	1–2	3–1	2–0
Chippenham Town	2–1	0–3	0–1	0–1	2–0	—	1–2	3–0	3–2	1–2	0–2	3–0	0–4	0–0	0–1	0–3	1–1	0–0	1–3	0–3	1–1	2–0	1–0	2–3
Dorking Wanderers	3–0	1–0	2–2	2–2	2–0	1–0	—	3–1	1–1	2–2	4–2	3–2	3–1	1–1	3–3	3–1	2–1	1–0	0–1	0–0	2–1	1–3	1–2	1–2
Eastbourne Borough	2–1	1–0	2–1	2–1	1–1	4–1	2–2	—	1–0	4–0	3–1	3–3	1–1	1–0	0–0	1–1	1–0	2–1	1–1	0–0	4–1	3–0	4–1	1–1
Enfield Town	2–4	1–1	0–2	2–1	2–3	0–0	0–2	0–5	—	1–0	1–0	0–1	1–2	1–4	1–1	1–6	1–1	1–3	1–4	3–2	2–0	1–0	1–0	1–5
Farnborough	2–0	0–2	0–2	3–4	2–1	3–1	3–4	2–0	4–1	—	0–0	0–1	0–1	2–2	3–1	1–0	1–0	0–2	1–0	1–1	2–1	2–1	3–0	1–0
Hampton & Richmond Borough	2–0	0–5	1–1	3–2	0–1	1–2	2–2	3–1	4–0	2–8	—	1–2	1–3	0–3	1–0	2–2	0–1	2–0	0–1	1–3	5–0	0–0	2–0	2–3
Hemel Hempstead Town	1–1	4–2	3–4	2–2	2–0	4–2	1–7	2–5	1–1	3–3	0–4	—	3–1	0–0	2–2	4–1	2–1	2–0	1–4	3–0	4–2	0–1	3–0	1–1
Hornchurch	2–0	0–0	2–1	0–2	2–1	1–2	0–1	0–1	3–1	1–0	1–1	1–0	—	0–0	1–1	2–3	1–0	2–2	2–1	1–3	0–0	2–4	1–0	1–0
Maidstone United	0–2	3–0	4–0	1–5	2–2	3–0	1–1	3–1	4–0	4–0	0–0	1–0	1–0	—	3–2	1–1	1–1	1–1	1–0	1–2	1–0	0–1	0–0	1–2
Salisbury	0–2	1–2	2–1	1–3	1–2	3–2	0–2	0–1	1–2	0–0	2–1	5–0	2–2	0–2	—	1–0	1–1	2–0	0–1	1–1	3–1	0–2	0–0	0–2
Slough Town	3–0	3–0	2–4	2–1	1–1	1–2	3–2	0–0	1–1	1–1	1–0	0–1	2–1	1–0	1–1	—	2–2	3–1	2–2	1–1	2–3	1–3	1–0	4–0
St Albans City	3–0	3–2	1–3	1–1	1–2	0–2	1–1	0–1	2–1	1–0	2–1	1–0	1–1	0–1	3–4	1–0	—	1–1	1–1	1–2	0–1	0–0	1–1	2–2
Tonbridge Angels	2–1	0–0	1–3	2–1	1–0	1–1	1–0	0–2	1–3	1–4	2–2	2–0	0–1	1–3	1–0	3–1	2–0	—	0–1	0–1	2–0	2–0	3–2	1–2
Torquay United	1–1	1–0	2–2	2–2	1–2	3–0	1–0	2–0	2–1	2–0	0–1	1–0	2–1	1–1	2–2	2–0	1–1	0–0	—	1–0	3–1	4–2	3–0	2–1
Truro City	2–1	0–0	2–1	2–1	2–1	1–1	1–2	0–1	3–1	1–1	3–0	1–0	2–1	0–2	1–0	2–0	5–2	2–1	0–1	—	3–2	1–1	1–1	5–0
Welling United	1–0	1–0	0–1	0–1	1–3	0–4	0–1	0–1	1–0	4–1	2–3	1–2	0–0	0–4	1–1	2–2	1–1	2–2	2–0	1–2	—	1–3	2–1	2–0
Weston-super-Mare	4–1	0–0	0–0	2–0	1–1	1–3	1–1	0–1	1–1	4–3	3–1	1–1	3–2	3–0	1–2	2–0	0–0	3–0	1–1	0–2	1–4	—	1–1	3–4
Weymouth	4–1	0–3	2–1	1–6	1–1	0–2	2–3	0–1	1–1	1–1	0–1	0–2	3–3	0–1	2–2	4–0	1–1	0–1	2–2	1–4	5–1	0–2	—	1–1
Worthing	2–1	2–1	2–1	1–1	3–0	4–1	1–1	0–0	1–0	1–2	2–0	3–0	0–0	0–2	3–2	4–3	1–1	3–2	2–2	1–2	1–0	3–0	1–0	—

Source: National League South Results Grid
Legend: Blue = home team win; Yellow = draw; Red = away team win.
For upcoming matches, an "a" indicates there is an article about the rivalry between the two participants.

=== Season statistics ===
As of 26 April 2025

=== Top scorers ===
Rank	Player	Club	Goals
1	(England) Tyler Harvey	Truro City	27
2	(England) George Alexander	Eastbourne Borough	24
2	(Ghana) Kwesi Appiah	Boreham Wood	24
4	(England) Cody Cooke	Torquay United	20
4	(England) Luke Coulson	Weston-super-Mare	20
4	(England) Alfie Rutherford	Dorking Wanderers	20
7	(England) Aaron Blair	Maidstone United	19
8	(England) Matt Rush	Boreham Wood	17
8	(England) Sam Youngs	Enfield Town	17

=== Hat-tricks ===
Player	For	Against	Result	Date
(Republic of Ireland) Jaze Kabia	Truro City	Worthing	5–0	26 August 2024
(England) Aaron Blair	Maidstone United	Enfield Town	1–4	7 September 2024
(England) James Roberts	Hampton & Richmond Borough	Enfield Town	4–0	28 September 2024
(England) George Alexander	Eastbourne Borough	Hemel Hempstead Town	2–5	2 November 2024
(England) Charlie Carter	Dorking Wanderers	Chelmsford City	0–4	9 November 2024
(England) Ken Charles	St Albans City	Aveley	6–3	25 November 2024
(England) Razzaq Coleman De-Graft	Aveley	St Albans City	6–3	25 November 2024
(England) Tyler Harvey	Truro City	Weymouth	1–4	26 November 2024
(Ghana) Kwesi Appiah	Boreham Wood	St Albans City	3–0	10 December 2024
(England) Alfie Rutherford	Dorking Wanderers	Chesham United	0–5	21 December 2024
(Ghana) Kwesi Appiah	Boreham Wood	Slough Town	5–1	1 January 2025
(England) Shaq Coulthirst	Maidstone United	Enfield Town	4–0	11 January 2025
(Bermuda) Kane Crichlow	Chelmsford City	Farnborough	3–4	8 February 2025
(England) George Alexander	Eastbourne Borough	Enfield Town	0–5	18 February 2025
(England) George Alexander	Eastbourne Borough	Hemel Hempstead Town	3–3	22 February 2025
(England) Luke Coulson	Weston-super-Mare	Hornchurch	2–4	29 March 2025
(England) George Alexander	Eastbourne Borough	Weymouth	4–1	5 April 2025
(England) Harry Gardner	Hampton & Richmond Borough	Welling United	5–0	12 April 2025
(Republic of Ireland) Jaze Kabia	Truro City	Hornchurch	1–3	12 April 2025
(England) Charlie Carter	Dorking Wanderers	Hampton & Richmond Borough	4–2	18 April 2025
(England) Charlie Ruff	Chelmsford City	Weymouth	1–6	26 April 2025
(England) Cody Cooke	Torquay United	Hemel Hempstead Town	1–4	26 April 2025

=== Monthly awards ===
Each month the Vanarama National League announces their official Player of the Month and Manager of the Month.

Month	Manager of the Month		Player of the Month		Reference
August	(Republic of Ireland) Scott Davies	Slough Town	(Northern Ireland) Sean Shields	Tonbridge Angels	
September	(England) Robbie Simpson	Chelmsford City	(England) James Roberts	Hampton & Richmond Borough	
October	(England) Scott Bartlett	Weston-super-Mare	(England) Tyler Harvey	Truro City	
November	(England) Paul Wotton	Torquay United	(England) George Alexander	Eastbourne Borough	
December	(Cameroon) George Elokobi	Maidstone United	(Ghana) Kwesi Appiah	Boreham Wood	
January	(England) Chris Agutter	Worthing	(São Tomé and Príncipe) Mauro Vilhete	Hampton & Richmond Borough	
February	(England) Marc White	Dorking Wanderers	(England) Darren McQueen	Hornchurch	
March	(England) Gavin Macpherson	Enfield Town	(England) Tyler Harvey	Truro City	
April	(England) John Askey	Truro City	(England) Cody Cooke	Torquay United	

=== Annual awards ===
Award	Winner	Club	Ref.
Player of the Season	(England) Tyler Harvey	Truro City	
Manager of the Season	(England) John Askey	Truro City	

National League South Team of the Season

Pos.	Player	Club	Ref.
GK	(England) Nathan Ashmore	Boreham Wood	
RB	(England) Christian Oxlade-Chamberlain	Truro City	
CB	(England) Ollie Kensdale	Eastbourne Borough	
CB	(England) Sam Dreyer	Torquay United	
LB	(England) Ben Brookes	Maidstone United	
CM	(England) Charlie Carter	Dorking Wanderers	
CM	(England) Luke Coulson	Weston-super-Mare	
CM	(England) Tom Whelan	Boreham Wood	
RW	(England) Tyler Harvey	Truro City	
CF	(England) Danny Cashman	Worthing	
LW	(Scotland) Jordan Young	Torquay United	
