= 2014–15 Dagenham & Redbridge F.C. season =

Dagenham & Redbridge
2014–15 season
- Chairman: Dave Bennett
- Manager: Wayne Burnett
- Stadium: Victoria Road
- League Two: 14th
- FA Cup: First round
- League Cup: First round
- Football League Trophy: Second round
- Top goalscorer: League: Jamie Cureton (19); All: Jamie Cureton (20)
- Highest home attendance: 3,393 (v Southend United, League Two, 14 March 2015)
- Lowest home attendance: 1,172 (v Southport, FA Cup, 8 November 2014)
- Average home league attendance: 2,041
Home colours	Away colours

The 2014–15 season is the 8th season in the Football League played by Dagenham & Redbridge F.C., an English football club based in Dagenham, Greater London. It is their fourth consecutive season in Football League Two after relegation from Football League One in 2011.

== Competitions ==
=== Football League Two ===
==== League table ====
Pos	Team	Pld	W	D	L	GF	GA	GD	Pts
12	Northampton Town	46	18	7	21	67	62	+5	61
13	Oxford United	46	15	16	15	50	49	+1	61
14	Dagenham & Redbridge	46	17	8	21	58	59	−1	59
15	AFC Wimbledon	46	14	16	16	54	60	−6	58
16	Portsmouth	46	14	15	17	52	54	−2	57

Updated to match(es) played on 23 May 2015. Source: BBC Sport
Rules for classification: 1) Points; 2) Goal difference; 3) Number of goals scored

==== Matches ====
Date	League position	Opponents	Venue	Result	Score F–A	Scorers	Attendance	Ref
9 August 2014	24th	Morecambe	H	L	0–3		1,529	
16 August 2014	24th	Burton Albion	A	L	1–2	Cureton 18'	2,150	
19 August 2014	18th	Hartlepool United	A	W	2–0	Howell 5', Ogogo 64'	2,792	
23 August 2014	10th	Mansfield Town	H	W	2–0	Howell 45+1', Ogogo 60'	1,558	
30 August 2014	12th	Oxford United	A	D	3–3	Hemmings 7', Cureton 46', Ogogo 71'	4,391	
6 September 2014	16th	Northampton Town	H	L	0–2		2,186	
13 September 2014	19th	Cambridge United	H	L	2–3	Howell 20', Porter 82'	2,049	
16 September 2014	19th	Portsmouth	A	L	0–3		13,648	
20 September 2014	21st	Cheltenham Town	A	D	1–1	Cureton 58'	2,597	
27 September 2014	19th	York City	H	W	2–0	Labadie (2) 35', 62'	1,801	
3 October 2014	19th	Exeter City	H	L	1–2	Cureton 11'	2,138	
11 October 2014	18th	Accrington Stanley	A	W	2–1	Yusuff (2) 57', 64'	1,412	
18 October 2014	19th	Newport County	H	L	0–1		1,654	
21 October 2014	20th	Luton Town	A	L	1–3	Doidge 86'	7,746	
25 October 2014	21st	Wycombe Wanderers	A	D	1–1	Cureton 63'	3,316	
1 November 2014	21st	Shrewsbury Town	H	L	1–2	Bingham 6'	1,698	
15 November 2014	22nd	AFC Wimbledon	A	L	0–1		3,887	
22 November 2014	21st	Carlisle United	H	W	4–2	Bingham 23', Chambers (2) 24', 46', Cureton 39'	2,097	
29 November 2014	20th	Bury	A	W	2–0	Jakubiak 55', Cureton 74'	3,042	
13 December 2014	20th	Tranmere Rovers	H	L	0–1		1,840	
20 December 2014	20th	Plymouth Argyle	A	L	0–3		7,176	
26 December 2014	22nd	Stevenage	H	L	0–2		1,779	
28 December 2014	23rd	Southend United	A	D	0–0		6,966	
3 January 2015	21st	Bury	H	W	1–0	Murphy 51'	1,877	
10 January 2015	21st	Oxford United	H	D	0–0		1,892	
17 January 2015	23rd	Northampton Town	A	L	0–1		4,122	
27 January 2015	22nd	Cambridge United	A	D	1–1	Hemmings 61'	4,068	
31 January 2015	19th	Cheltenham Town	H	W	3–1	Cureton 55', Hemmings 71', Jakubiak 90+4'	2,696	
7 February 2015	17th	York City	A	W	2–0	Cureton (2) 19', 52'	2,958	
10 February 2015	18th	Portsmouth	H	D	0–0		2,310	
15 February 2015	17th	Morecambe	A	W	3–2	Howell 1', Obileye 48', Cureton 52'	1,351	
21 February 2015	18th	Burton Albion	H	L	1–3	Jakubiak 67'	1,718	
28 February 2015	19th	Mansfield Town	A	L	1–2	Cureton 60'	2,546	
3 March 2015	18th	Hartlepool United	H	W	2–0	Harrison 22' o.g., Bingham 66'	1,799	
7 March 2015	16th	Tranmere Rovers	A	W	3–2	Cureton 40', Hemmings 50', Bingham 54'	4,762	
14 March 2015	18th	Southend United	H	L	1–3	Obileye 23'	3,393	
17 March 2015	15th	Plymouth Argyle	H	W	2–0	Ogogo 30', Cureton 88'	1,713	
21 March 2015	15th	Stevenage	A	W	1–0	Howell 54'	2,795	
28 March 2015	15th	Wycombe Wanderers	H	L	0–1		2,362	
3 April 2015	16th	Shrewsbury Town	A	L	0–2		6,143	
6 April 2015	15th	AFC Wimbledon	H	W	4–0	Cureton (3) 2', 71', 74', Doe 58'	2,346	
11 April 2015	15th	Carlisle United	A	L	0–1		3,660	
14 April 2015	15th	Luton Town	H	D	0–0		2,461	
18 April 2015	14th	Newport County	A	W	3–2	Hemmings 78', Doidge 81', Jakubiak 88'	2,737	
25 April 2015	13th	Accrington Stanley	H	W	4–0	Partridge 20', Cureton 47', Raymond 67', Jones 90'	2,038	
2 May 2015	14th	Exeter City	A	L	1–2	Cureton 90+1'	3,645	

=== FA Cup ===
Round	Date	Opponents	Venue	Result	Score F–A	Scorers	Attendance	Ref
First round	8 November 2014	Southport	H	D	0–0		1,172	
First round replay	18 November 2014	Southport	A	L	0–2		1,472	

=== Football League Cup ===
Round	Date	Opponents	Venue	Result	Score F–A	Scorers	Attendance	Ref
First round	12 August 2014	Brentford	H	D	6–6 (a.e.t.) (2–4 p)	Porter 17', Chambers 45+2', Boucaud 55', Hemmings (2) 90', 113', Cureton 100'	1,576	

=== Football League Trophy ===
Round	Date	Opponents	Venue	Result	Score F–A	Scorers	Attendance	Ref
Second round	7 October 2014	Leyton Orient	H	L	0–2		2,318	

== Appearances and goals ==
Numbers in parentheses denote appearances as substitute.
Players with names struck through and marked † left the club during the playing season.
Players with names in italics and marked * were on loan from another club with Dagenham & Redbridge.
Players listed with no appearances have been in the matchday squad but only as unused substitutes.
Key to positions: GK – Goalkeeper; DF – Defender; MF – Midfielder; FW – Forward

No.	Pos.	Nat.	Name	League		FA Cup		League Cup		FL Trophy		Total		Discipline	
No.	Pos.	Nat.	Name	Apps	Goals	Apps	Goals	Apps	Goals	Apps	Goals	Apps	Goals	A yellow rectangle, denoting the yellow penalty card shown to a player being cautioned	A red rectangle, denoting the red penalty card shown to a player being sent off
1	GK	ENG	Liam O'Brien	9 (1)	0	0	0	1	0	1	0	11 (1)	0	0	0
2	DF	ENG	~~Damian Batt~~ †	24 (4)	0	2	0	1	0	1	0	28 (4)	0	6	0
3	DF	IRL	Jack Connors	14 (3)	0	0	0	0 (1)	0	0	0	14 (4)	0	5	0
4	DF	ENG	Scott Doe	39	1	0	0	1	0	1	0	41	1	3	0
5	DF	ENG	Brian Saah	22 (1)	0	2	0	1	0	1	0	26 (1)	0	3	0
6	MF	ENG	Billy Bingham	32 (2)	4	2	0	0	0	1	0	35 (2)	4	5	0
7	FW	ENG	Jamie Cureton	40 (5)	19	2	0	0 (1)	1	0	0	42 (6)	20	2	0
8	MF	ENG	Abu Ogogo	28 (4)	4	1	0	1	0	1	0	31 (4)	4	2	1
9	FW	IRL	~~Rhys Murphy~~ †	6 (3)	1	1 (1)	0	0	0	0	0	7 (4)	1	0	0
9	FW	IRL	~~Shamir Fenelon~~ * †	3 (1)	0	0	0	0	0	0	0	3 (1)	0	0	0
10	MF	ENG	Ashley Chambers	27 (5)	2	2	0	1	1	1	0	31 (5)	3	3	0
11	MF	ENG	Zavon Hines	0	0	0	0	0	0	0	0	0	0	0	0
12	FW	WAL	Christian Doidge	3 (8)	2	0 (1)	0	0	0	1	0	4 (9)	2	2	0
14	MF	ENG	~~George Porter~~ †	7 (12)	1	1 (1)	0	1	1	0 (1)	0	9 (14)	2	1	0
15	MF	ENG	Joss Labadie	16 (8)	2	1	0	1	0	1	0	19 (8)	2	5	0
16	DF	ENG	~~Nathan Green~~ †	6 (1)	0	1	0	0	0	0	0	7 (1)	0	0	0
16	FW	TRI	Daniel Carr *	0 (6)	0	0	0	0	0	0	0	0 (6)	0	0	0
17	MF	ENG	Luke Howell	29 (2)	5	2	0	0 (1)	0	0	0	31 (3)	5	2	1
19	FW	ENG	Bradley Goldberg	0 (5)	0	0 (1)	0	0	0	0 (1)	0	0 (7)	0	0	0
20	MF	NIR	~~Sean Shields~~ †	0	0	0	0	0	0	0	0	0	0	0	0
21	DF	ENG	Matt Partridge	20 (4)	1	2	0	1	0	1	0	24 (4)	1	6	0
22	DF	ENG	Ian Gayle	6	0	0	0	0	0	0	0	6	0	1	0
23	MF	ENG	Ashley Hemmings	36 (5)	5	1 (1)	0	1	2	0	0	38 (6)	7	2	0
24	FW	ENG	Jon Nouble	0	0	0	0	0	0	0	0	0	0	0	0
25	MF	ENG	~~Josh Clarke~~ * †	0	0	0	0	0	0	0	0	0	0	0	0
25	DF	ENG	Ayo Obileye *	25 (1)	2	0	0	0	0	0	0	25 (1)	2	6	1
27	FW	ENG	Adeoye Yusuff	9 (9)	2	0	0	0	0	1	0	10 (9)	2	1	0
28	MF	TRI	Andre Boucaud	36 (5)	0	0 (1)	0	1	1	0	0	37 (6)	1	3	1
29	MF	ENG	Frankie Raymond	2	1	0	0	0	0	0 (1)	0	2 (1)	1	0	0
30	GK	ENG	Mark Cousins	37	0	2	0	0	0	0	0	39	0	1	0
31	FW	ENG	Mason Bloomfield	0 (1)	0	0	0	0	0	0	0	0 (1)	0	0	0
32	MF	ENG	Jodi Jones	2 (6)	1	0	0	0	0	0	0	2 (6)	1	0	0
33	DF	ENG	Joe Widdowson	20 (1)	0	0	0	0	0	0	0	20 (1)	0	5	0
34	FW	GHA	~~Patrick Agyemang~~ * †	2 (2)	0	0	0	0	0	0	0	2 (2)	0	0	0
35	FW	SCO	Alex Jakubiak *	6 (17)	4	0	0	0	0	0	0	6 (17)	4	2	0
38	GK	ENG	Lewis Moore	0	0	0	0	0	0	0	0	0	0	0	0

== Transfers ==
=== In ===
Date	Name	From	Fee	Ref
29 May 2014	Liam O'Brien	Brentford	Free	
19 June 2014	Ashley Chambers	Cambridge United	Free	
23 June 2014	Mark Cousins	Colchester United	Free	
23 June 2014	Nathan Green	Tonbridge Angels	Undisclosed	
24 June 2014	Damian Batt	Eastleigh	Free	
1 July 2014	Frankie Raymond	Eastbourne Borough	Undisclosed	
8 July 2014	Joss Labadie	Torquay United	Free	
8 July 2014	Matt Partridge	Reading	Free	
24 July 2014	Jamie Cureton	Cheltenham Town	Free	
28 July 2014	Ashley Hemmings	Walsall	Free	
4 August 2014	George Porter	Rochdale	Free	
7 August 2014	Andre Boucaud	Notts County	Free	
15 August 2014	Christian Doidge	Carmarthen Town	Undisclosed	
12 September 2014	Adeoye Yusuff	Chatham Town	Undisclosed	
9 January 2015	Joe Widdowson	Bury	Free	

=== Out ===
Date	Name	To	Fee	Ref
8 May 2014	Femi Ilesanmi	York City	Released	
8 May 2014	Chris Lewington	Colchester United	Released	
8 May 2014	Alex Osborn	Ebbsfleet United	Released	
13 May 2014	Chris Dickson	Pafos FC	Released	
15 May 2014	Jordan Seabright	Torquay United	Released	
27 May 2014	Matthew Saunders	Whitehawk	Released	
30 June 2014	Gavin Hoyte	Gillingham	Released	
7 July 2014	Luke Wilkinson	Luton Town	Undisclosed	
15 July 2014	Medy Elito	VVV-Venlo	Undisclosed	
24 July 2014	Afolabi Obafemi	Welling United	Released	
3 January 2015	Nathan Green	Dartford	Free	
16 January 2015	Sean Shields	Ebbsfleet United	Released	
30 January 2015	George Porter	Maidstone United	Released	
2 February 2015	Rhys Murphy	Oldham Athletic	Undisclosed	

=== Loans in ===
Date	Name	From	End date	Ref
22 August 2014	Josh Clarke	Brentford	22 September 2014	
21 November 2014	Ayo Obileye	Charlton Athletic	31 May 2015	
27 November 2014	Patrick Agyemang	Portsmouth	7 January 2015	
27 November 2014	Alex Jakubiak	Watford	30 June 2015	
27 November 2014	Joe Widdowson	Bury	4 January 2015	
2 February 2015	Daniel Carr	Huddersfield Town	31 May 2015	
27 February 2015	Shamir Fenelon	Brighton & Hove Albion	28 March 2015	

=== Loans out ===
Date	Name	To	End date	Ref
22 August 2014	Sean Shields	St Albans City	22 November 2014	
22 August 2014	Jon Nouble	Welling United	26 October 2014	
16 September 2014	Mason Bloomfield	Chatham Town	30 September 2014	
24 October 2014	Mason Bloomfield	Erith & Belvedere	29 November 2014	
6 November 2014	Jon Nouble	St Albans City	6 December 2014	
13 November 2014	Frankie Raymond	Eastbourne Borough	14 February 2014	
14 November 2014	Ian Gayle	St Albans City	14 February 2015	
20 November 2014	Bradley Goldberg	Bristol Rovers	24 January 2015	
27 November 2014	Nathan Green	St Albans City	27 December 2014	
9 December 2014	Sean Shields	Ebbsfleet United	9 January 2015	
19 December 2014	Jon Nouble	Thurrock	19 January 2015	
22 December 2014	Mason Bloomfield	Maldon & Tiptree		
16 January 2015	Christian Doidge	Dartford	14 March 2015	
19 January 2015	Jon Nouble	Grays Athletic	19 February 2015	
23 January 2015	Bradley Goldberg	Bromley	31 May 2015	
6 March 2015	Brian Saah	Woking	4 April 2015	
