= Bradley Goldberg =

English footballer

Personal information
- Full name: Bradley Jack Goldberg
- Date of birth: 20 October 1993 (age 33)
- Place of birth: Bromley, England
- Height: 1.71 m (5 ft 7 1/2 in)
- Positions: Winger; forward

Youth career
- 2002–2010: Bromley
- 2010–2012: Charlton Athletic

Senior career*
Years	Team	Apps	(Gls)
2011–2012	Charlton Athletic	0	(0)
2011–2012	→ Bromley (loan)	6	(0)
2012	→ Hastings United (loan)	14	(4)
2012–2013	Hastings United	19	(5)
2012	→ Bromley (dual registration)	1	(0)
2013–2015	Dagenham & Redbridge	5	(0)
2013–2014	→ Bromley (loan)	42	(23)
2014–2015	→ Bristol Rovers (loan)	6	(0)
2015	→ Bromley (loan)	17	(7)
2015–2017	Bromley	60	(8)
2017–2020	Welling United	102	(23)
2022	Beckenham Town	4	(1)
Total		276	(71)
- * Club domestic league appearances and goals as of 17:11, 15 November 2024 (UTC)

Bradley Jack Goldberg (born 20 October 1993) is an English former professional footballer who played as a forward.

== Career ==
Goldberg started his career in the youth system at Bromley, where he played from every level from under–9 to under–16. In April 2010, he was offered a two-year scholarship at Charlton Athletic. In November 2011, he signed for Conference South side Bromley on work experience terms, making his senior debut in a 2–1 defeat to Boreham Wood. He spent two months with the club, making eight appearances in all competitions. After returning from Bromley, he was sent out on work experience again in February 2012, signing for Isthmian League Premier Division side Hastings United. He went on to make fourteen appearances for the club scoring four times. In the summer of 2012, he failed to earn a professional contract at Charlton after his scholarship had expired and was released by the club.

In June 2012, Goldberg returned to Hastings United permanently before signing dual-registration terms with Bromley in August 2012. During his time with Hastings he was part of the side that reached the third round of the FA Cup, eventually losing 4–1 away to Middlesbrough, where he scored a long-distance goal. He finished the season as top goalscorer with seventeen goals, however, he could not save the club from relegation from the Isthmian League Premier Division.

In August 2013, Goldberg signed for Football League Two side Dagenham & Redbridge on a one-year contract having impressed on trial during pre-season, scoring in wins against Whitstable Town and Dover Athletic. He was immediately loaned out to Conference South side Bromley on a season-long loan, re-uniting with his father. After an impressive start to the season he attracted interest from Football League clubs, having scored 14 goals by January. Having battled for the title throughout the season, Bromley eventually missed out on promotion in the play-offs to Ebbsfleet United. He finished the campaign with the Conference South golden boot award having scored 23 goals in 42 league appearances, and was also named the Conference South Player of the Year.

In May 2014 upon his return to Dagenham, Goldberg signed a new one-year contract with the club having fended off interest from other clubs. In August 2014, he made his professional and Daggers debut in a 3–0 home defeat to Morecambe, replacing Ashley Hemmings as a second-half substitute. However, he struggled to establish himself in the first team and in November 2014 he joined Conference Premier side Bristol Rovers on a one-month loan deal. He made his debut in the 2–2 draw with Chester, replacing Nathan Blissett as a late substitute. In December 2014, his loan was extended for a further month, having made four appearances. He returned to Dagenham in January 2015 having made seven appearances for the club. He immediately re-joined Conference South side Bromley on loan until the end of season. In May 2015, Goldberg was released by Dagenham after two seasons due to the expiry of his contract, he made a total of seven appearances for the club. In June 2015, he re-joined Bromley, newly promoted to the National League, on a free transfer.

At the end of the 2016–17 season, Goldberg left Bromley.

Having not played for a club since his departure from Welling United in 2020, Goldberg joined newly promoted Isthmian League South East Division side Beckenham Town in August 2022.

== Personal life ==
Goldberg is the son of former Crystal Palace chairman and former Bromley manager Mark Goldberg.

After his football career, Goldberg co-founded Educate2Trade with former tennis player Lewis Burton. The company provides financial-trading education and offers vocational qualification programmes.

== Career statistics ==
Appearances and goals by club, season and competition
Club	Season	League			FA Cup		League Cup		Other		Total	
Club	Season	Division	Apps	Goals	Apps	Goals	Apps	Goals	Apps	Goals	Apps	Goals
Bromley (loan)	2011–12	Conference South	6	0	1	0	—		1 (Note: Appearance in FA Trophy)	0	8	0
Hastings United (loan)	2011–12	Isthmian Premier Division	14	4	—		—		0	0	14	4
Hastings United	2012–13	Isthmian Premier Division	19	5	9	7	—		4 (Note: One appearance in FA Trophy, two appearances and three goals in Isthmian League Cup, one appearance and two goals in Sussex Senior Cup)	5	32	17
Hastings United	Total		33	9	9	7	—		4	5	46	21
Bromley	2012–13	Conference South	1	0	—		—		0	0	1	0
Bromley (loan)	2013–14	Conference South	42	23	2	0	—		4 (Note: One appearance in FA Trophy, two in Conference South play-offs, one appearance and one goal in London Senior Cup)	1	48	24
Bromley (loan)	Total		43	23	2	0	—		4	1	49	24
Dagenham & Redbridge	2014–15	League Two	5	0	1	0	0	0	1 (Note: Appearance in Football League Trophy)	0	7	0
Bristol Rovers (loan)	2014–15	Conference Premier	6	0	—		—		1	0	7	0
Bromley (loan)	2014–15	Conference South	17	7	—		—		—		17	7
Bromley	2015–16	National League	32	5	1	0	—		0	0	33	5
Bromley	2016–17	National League	28	3	2	0	—		2	0	32	3
Bromley	Total		77	15	3	0	—		2	0	82	15
Welling United	2017–18	National League South	38	10	0	0	—		1	0	39	10
Welling United	2018–19	National League South	39	12	1	0	—		5 (Note: One appearance in FA Trophy, two appearances and one goal in National League South play-offs, two in London Senior Cup)	1	45	13
Welling United	2019–20	National League South	25	1	4	5	—		3 (Note: Two appearances in FA Trophy, one in Kent Senior Cup)	0	32	6
Welling United	Total		102	23	5	5	—		9	1	116	29
Beckenham Town	2022–23	Isthmian League South East Division	4	1	1	0	—		1 (Note: Appearance(s) in Kent Senior Cup)	0	6	1
Career total			276	71	22	12	0	0	23	7	321	90
