= Nathan Green (footballer) =

English footballer (born 1992)

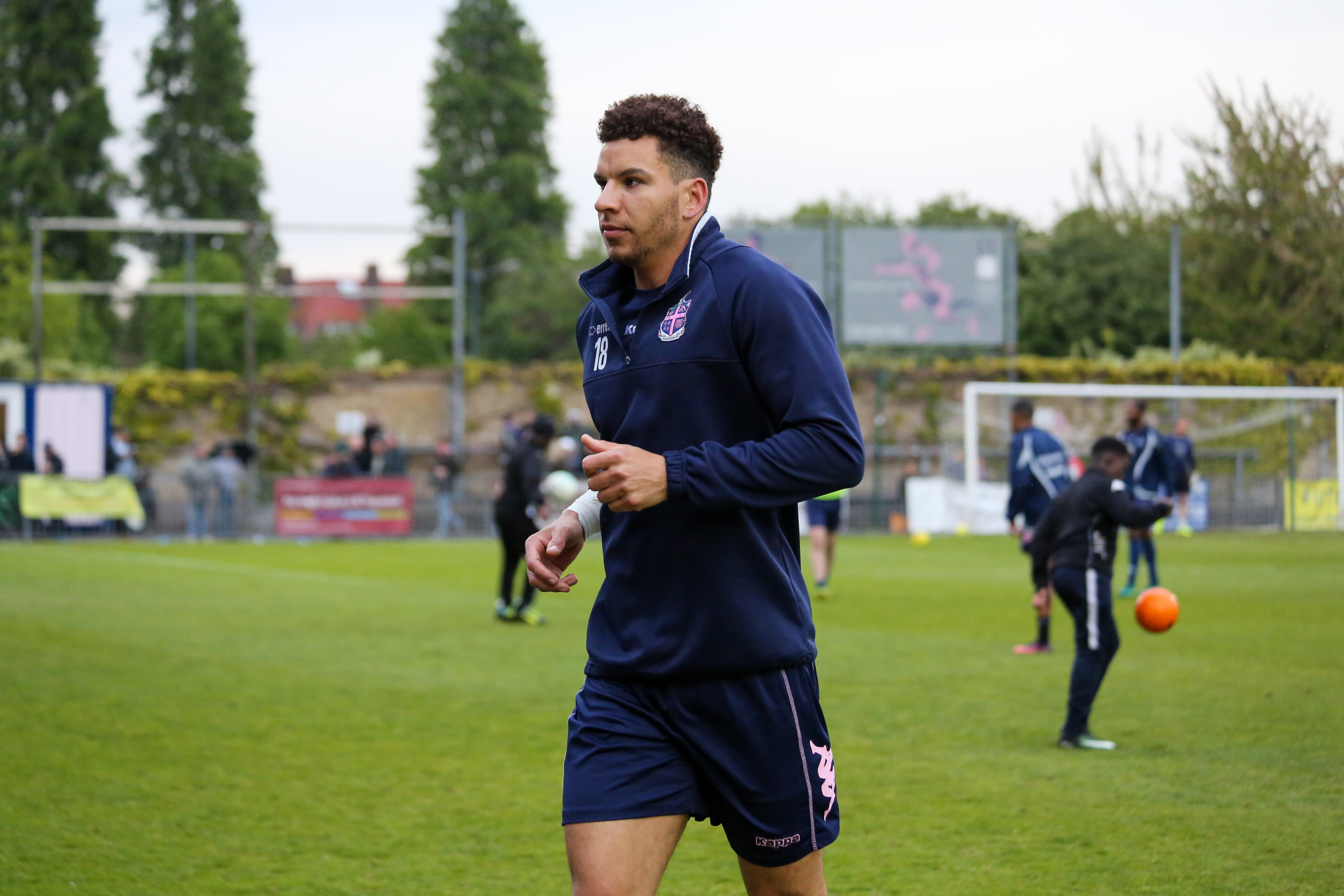
- Nathan Green playing for Dulwich Hamlet in 2017.

Personal information
- Full name: Nathan Green
- Date of birth: 8 June 1992 (age 34)
- Place of birth: Bermondsey, England
- Positions: Defender; midfielder

Youth career
- –2008: Croydon Athletic

Senior career*
Years	Team	Apps	(Gls)
2008–2010	Croydon Athletic	?	(?)
2010	→ Chipstead (loan)	?	(?)
2010–2011	Lewes	11	(0)
2011–2012	Bromley	10	(0)
2012–2013	Billericay Town	17	(2)
2012	→ Kingstonian (loan)	3	(0)
2013–2014	Tonbridge Angels	58	(4)
2014–2015	Dagenham & Redbridge	7	(0)
2014	→ St Albans City (loan)	4	(0)
2015	Dartford	15	(2)
2015–2016	Margate	40	(1)
2016–2019	Dulwich Hamlet	?	(?)
2019–2021	Welling United	37	(1)
2021–2022	Cray Valley Paper Mills	34	(3)
2022–2023	Folkestone Invicta	38	(5)
2023–2024	Hornchurch	22	(0)
2024–2025	Folkestone Invicta	13	(0)
- * Club domestic league appearances and goals as of 19:49, 4 May 2025 (UTC)

Nathan Green (born 8 June 1992) is an English footballer who plays as a defender and midfielder. In the 2014–15 season, he played in the Football League for Dagenham & Redbridge.

== Career ==
Green was born in Bermondsey and represented the Bermondsey & Rotherhithe PSFA district as a schoolboy.

He started his career in the Youth system at Croydon Athletic, before breaking into the first team in 2008 whilst still in the youth team. In January 2010, he joined Isthmian League Division One South side Chipstead on loan, where he gained invaluable experience. After he returned to the club in March 2010, he was part of the Croydon side that won the title and gained promotion to the Isthmian League Premier Division.

In November 2010 he signed for Conference South side Lewes, where he was reunited with manager Tim O'Shea, who had previously managed him at Croydon.

He stayed with the Rooks for a season before transferring to fellow Conference South side Bromley in August 2011. In January 2012, he was released by Bromley, however his registration was retained.

Shortly after, he dropped to the Isthmian League Premier Division signing for Billericay Town, helping them to the league title at the end of the season. Following promotion, he was a regular for Billericay in the Conference South before joining Isthmian League Premier Division Kingstonian on loan in December 2012. He returned to Billericay at the end of the month.

In January 2013, he joined Conference South side Tonbridge Angels on a free transfer. During his time with the Angels he featured regularly in the first team, however, he could not save the side from relegation to the Isthmian League in his first full season with the club.

In June 2014, he signed for Football League Two side Dagenham & Redbridge for an undisclosed fee, signing a one-year contract. He made his professional debut for Dagenham & Redbridge in a 2–0 defeat to Northampton Town in September 2014, replacing George Porter as a substitute. However, he struggled to cement a regular place in the first team and in November 2014 he was sent out on loan to Conference South side St Albans City on a one-month loan after just eight appearances for the club. He made his debut in the 1–1 draw with Wealdstone in the FA Trophy, scoring a late equalising goal with a spectacular thirty-yard effort. Green returned to Dagenham at the end of December having made six appearances for the club. In January 2015, his contract was terminated by Dagenham and he left the club by mutual consent having only made eight appearances for the first team.

He immediately joined Conference Premier side Dartford on a six-month contract until the end of the season. He made his debut for the club the next day in the 2–1 home defeat to Kidderminster Harriers.

In June 2015, he rejected a new contract offer from relegated side Dartford and signed for newly promoted National League South side Margate on a free transfer.

After one season with Margate, Green joined Dulwich Hamlet of the Isthmian League Premier Division ahead of the 2016–2017 season. He went on to score his first goal for the club against Metropolitan Police in a 1–1 away draw on 20 September 2016, before going on to score his second goal with the opener against Chesham United in a 4–0 home FA Trophy victory on 12 November 2016. He left Dulwich to join Welling United in June 2019.

In June 2022, Green joined Folkestone Invicta from Cray Valley Paper Mills.

In June 2023, Green joined fellow Isthmian League Premier Division side Hornchurch. In November, he suffered a serious knee injury, a complete rupture of his Meniscus Cruciate Ligament, not featuring again as Hornchurch were promoted as champions. In December 2024, he returned to Folkestone Invicta. He departed the club at the end of the 2024–25 season.

== Career statistics ==
As of end of 2016–17 season

Appearances and goals by club, season and competition
Club	Season	League			FA Cup		League Cup		Other		Total	
Club	Season	Division	Apps	Goals	Apps	Goals	Apps	Goals	Apps	Goals	Apps	Goals
Lewes	2010–11	Conference South	11	0	—		—		—		11	0
Bromley	2011–12	Conference South	10	0	1	0	—		3 (Note: One appearance in FA Trophy, one in Kent Senior Cup, one in London Senior Cup)	0	14	0
Billericay Town	2012–13	Conference South	17	2	3	0	—		3 (Note: Two appearances in FA Trophy, one in Essex Senior Cup)	0	23	2
Kingstonian (loan)	2012–13	IL Premier Division	3	0	—		—		—		3	0
Tonbridge Angels	2012–13	Conference South	19	0	—		—		—		19	0
Tonbridge Angels	2013–14	Conference South	39	4	3	0	—		4 (Note: Appearances in FA Trophy)	0	46	4
Tonbridge Angels	Total		58	4	3	0	—		4	0	65	4
Dagenham & Redbridge	2014–15	League Two	7	0	1	0	0	0	0	0	8	0
St Albans City (loan)	2014–15	Conference South	4	0	—		—		2	1	6	1
Dartford	2014–15	Conference Premier	15	2	—		—		—		15	2
Margate	2015–16	National League South	40	1	3	0	—		2 (Note: One appearance in FA Trophy, one in Kent Senior Cup)	0	45	1
Dulwich Hamlet	2016–17	IL Premier Division	42	3	2	0	—		15 (Note: Two appearances in the Isthmian League Play Offs, ten appearances and two goals in FA Trophy, three appearances in Isthmian League Cup)	2	59	5
Career total			208	13	12	0	0	0	29	3	249	16

== Personal life ==
Away from football, Green works as a scaffolder.

== Honours ==
Croydon Athletic

- Isthmian League Division One South champions: 2009–10

Billericay Town

- Isthmian League Premier Division champions: 2011–12
