= Ashley Hemmings =

English footballer (born 1991)

Personal information
- Full name: Ashley Josiah Hemmings
- Date of birth: 3 March 1991 (age 35)
- Place of birth: Lewisham, England
- Height: 5 ft 8 in (1.73 m)
- Positions: Forward; winger

Team information
- Current team: Oxford City (on loan from Dagenham & Redbridge)

Youth career
- –2009: Wolverhampton Wanderers

Senior career*
| Years | Team | Apps | (Gls) |
| 2009–2012 | Wolverhampton Wanderers | 2 | (0) |
| 2009 | → Cheltenham Town (loan) | 1 | (0) |
| 2010–2011 | → Torquay United (loan) | 9 | (0) |
| 2011–2012 | → Plymouth Argyle (loan) | 23 | (2) |
| 2012–2014 | Walsall | 56 | (3) |
| 2014 | → Burton Albion (loan) | 5 | (0) |
| 2014–2016 | Dagenham & Redbridge | 80 | (9) |
| 2016–2017 | Mansfield Town | 16 | (0) |
| 2017–2018 | Boston United | 41 | (16) |
| 2018 | Salford City | 0 | (0) |
| 2018–2019 | AFC Fylde | 27 | (3) |
| 2018–2019 | → Altrincham (loan) | 4 | (2) |
| 2019 | → Altrincham (loan) | 8 | (1) |
| 2019–2025 | Kidderminster Harriers | 209 | (76) |
| 2025– | Dagenham & Redbridge | 18 | (5) |
| 2025–2026 | → Kidderminster Harriers (loan) | 11 | (0) |
| 2026 | → Oxford City (loan) | 11 | (1) |

International career
| 2007 | England U17 | 4 | (0) |
- * Club domestic league appearances and goals as of 16:15, 17 May 2026 (UTC)

Ashley Josiah Hemmings (born 3 March 1991) is an English professional footballer who plays as a forward or winger for Gloucester City.

Hemmings began his career with Wolverhampton Wanderers before being released in 2012, by then having also had loan spells at Cheltenham Town, Torquay United and Plymouth Argyle.

== Club career ==
=== Wolverhampton Wanderers ===
Hemmings was born in Lewisham, London. He is a product of Wolverhampton Wanderers' academy, having been with the club since age nine.

He signed a professional contract age 17 in February 2009 and soon went on loan for a month to gain first team experience at League One club Cheltenham Town, where he made his senior debut against Millwall.

He made his Wolves debut as a substitute against Barnsley on 25 April 2009 in which the club clinched the Championship title; he also featured as a substitute against Doncaster Rovers a week later on the final day of the season. At the end of the 2009–10 season, Hemming signed a two-year contract with the club.

To gain further first team experience, he went on a month's loan to League Two club Torquay United in October 2010 making his debut on 23 October, as a substitute, in a 1–1 draw at Gillingham. In the second round of a FA Cup, Hemmings provided a winning goal for Billy Kee as Torquay beat Walsall 1–0. However, after making nine league appearances, Hemmings loan spell at Torquay United had ended, despite having it extended until the end of the season.

In November 2011, he moved on loan to League Two club Plymouth Argyle until January 2012. He scored his first senior goal on his debut for the Pilgrims against Northampton Town; then scored his second goal, which turns out to be a winner and provided a double assist in a 3–2 win over Bristol Rovers. His loan spell was then extended to run until the end of the season.

His contract at Wolves expired in June 2012 and was not renewed. After being released by Plymouth, Hemmings was linked with a return to Plymouth on a permanent basis, but manager Carl Fletcher decided against signing Hemmings.

=== Walsall ===
A free agent, Hemmings signed for League One club Walsall on a two-year contract. Hemmings scored on his Walsall debut against Brentford with an 18-yard drive into the bottom corner of the goal in the first round of the League Cup and made his league debut in an opening game of the season; as Walsall lost 3–0 against Doncaster Rovers. On 17 November 2012, Hemmings scored his first league goal for the club in a 2–2 draw against Crawley Town. In his first season at Walsall, Hemmings made 34 appearances and scored twice in all competitions.

His second season at Walsall saw Hemmings play the first two matches, which saw him earn Man of the Match. Hemmings then scored his first goal of the season, in the second round of League Cup, in a 3–1 loss against Stoke City. A week later in the first round of Football League Trophy, Hemmings scored against his former club, as Walsall lose on penalty shoot-out following a 2–2 draw. His first league goal didn't came until 22 October 2013 against Swindon Town when he scored a brace, in a 3–1 win. However soon after, Hemmings' performance soon gone badly and his first team chance was soon limited.

On 27 March 2014, Hemmings joined League Two club Burton Albion on loan until 24 April 2014. Because Burton reached the play-offs Hemmings extended his loan until the end of the 2013–14 season. He was released by Walsall in May 2014.

=== Dagenham & Redbridge ===
In July 2014, he signed for League Two club Dagenham & Redbridge on a one-year contract after training with the club during pre-season.

Hemmings made his Dagenham & Redbridge in the opening game of the season, in a 3–0 loss against Morecambe. Three days later on 12 August 2014, Hemmings scored twice and provided an assist for George Porter, in a 6–6 draw in the first round of League Cup against Brentford, but lost 4–2 in the penalty shoot-out. Two weeks later on 30 August 2014, Hemmings scored his first league goal of the season, in a 3–3 draw against Oxford United. Hemmings then changed into a position as a defensive role Hemmings scored two goals in two games against Cambridge United and Cheltenham Town. His fourth goal later came on 7 March 2015, in a 3–2 win over Tranmere Rovers, followed up with his fifth goal of the season, in a 3–2 win over Newport County. At the end of the season, making forty-four appearances and scoring seven times in all competitions, Hemmings signed a one-year contract extension with the club. In May 2016 as his contract expired, he was released along with eleven players as Dagenham were relegated to the National League.

=== Mansfield Town ===
Hemmings signed for Nottinghamshire club Mansfield Town on 3 June 2016. Hemmings scored his first goal for Mansfield in an FA Cup tie against Plymouth Argyle on 5 November 2016. He was released by Mansfield at the end of the 2016–17 season.

=== Non-League ===
Following his departure from Mansfield, Hemmings then joined Boston United and was Boston's top goalscorer for the 2017–18 season with 16 goals. He was voted by Boston fans as the club's player of the season.

Hemmings signed for newly promoted National League club Salford City on 30 May 2018. He left less than two months later on 24 July 2018, signing for another National League club, AFC Fylde, on a two-year contract. He stated that he decided to move as he was more likely to play regularly at Fylde. In December 2018, he joined Altrincham on a one-month loan deal. He scored 2 goals in 5 appearances before returning to his parent club.

Hemmings joined Kidderminster Harriers in October 2019 on an 18-month contract. In February 2021, he signed a new contract to keep him at the club for an additional season. After scoring two goals in the month, complete with a number of impressive performances, Hemmings was awarded the National League North Player of the Month award for October 2021.

On 30 June 2025, Hemmings returned to Dagenham & Redbridge on a one-year deal for an undisclosed fee, now of the National League South. In December 2025, he returned to Kidderminster Harriers on an initial loan until the end of January 2026.

== International career ==
Hemmings made his debut for the England national under-17 team on 30 July when starting a 2–0 win over Iceland in their opening match at the 2007 Nordic Cup. He played in all of England's matches at the tournament, and came on as a substitute on 4 August 2007 in the third-place match, with England beating Norway 4–1. This was the last of his four appearances for the under-17s.

== Career statistics ==
As of 5 December 2025

Appearances and goals by club, season and competition
| Club | Season | League | | | FA Cup | | League Cup | | Other | | Total | |
| Club | Season | Division | Apps | Goals | Apps | Goals | Apps | Goals | Apps | Goals | Apps | Goals |
|---|---|---|---|---|---|---|---|---|---|---|---|---|
| Wolverhampton Wanderers | 2008–09 | Championship | 2 | 0 | 0 | 0 | 0 | 0 | — | | 2 | 0 |
| Wolverhampton Wanderers | 2009–10 | Premier League | 0 | 0 | 0 | 0 | 0 | 0 | — | | 0 | 0 |
| Wolverhampton Wanderers | 2010–11 | Premier League | 0 | 0 | — | | 1 | 0 | — | | 1 | 0 |
| Wolverhampton Wanderers | 2011–12 | Premier League | 0 | 0 | — | | 0 | 0 | — | | 0 | 0 |
| Wolverhampton Wanderers | Total | | 2 | 0 | 0 | 0 | 1 | 0 | — | | 3 | 0 |
| Cheltenham Town (loan) | 2008–09 | League One | 1 | 0 | — | | — | | — | | 1 | 0 |
| Torquay United (loan) | 2010–11 | League Two | 9 | 0 | 2 | 0 | — | | — | | 11 | 0 |
| Plymouth Argyle (loan) | 2011–12 | League Two | 23 | 2 | — | | — | | — | | 23 | 2 |
| Walsall | 2012–13 | League One | 29 | 1 | 2 | 0 | 2 | 1 | 1 (Note: Appearance(s) in Football League Trophy) | 0 | 34 | 2 |
| Walsall | 2013–14 | League One | 27 | 2 | 2 | 0 | 2 | 1 | 1 | 1 | 32 | 4 |
| Walsall | Total | | 56 | 3 | 4 | 0 | 4 | 2 | 2 | 1 | 66 | 6 |
| Burton Albion (loan) | 2013–14 | League Two | 5 | 0 | — | | — | | 0 | 0 | 5 | 0 |
| Dagenham & Redbridge | 2014–15 | League Two | 41 | 5 | 2 | 0 | 1 | 2 | 0 | 0 | 44 | 7 |
| Dagenham & Redbridge | 2015–16 | League Two | 39 | 4 | 4 | 0 | 1 | 0 | 3 | 1 | 47 | 5 |
| Dagenham & Redbridge | Total | | 80 | 9 | 6 | 0 | 2 | 2 | 3 | 1 | 91 | 12 |
| Mansfield Town | 2016–17 | League Two | 16 | 0 | 1 | 1 | 1 | 0 | 5 (Note: Appearances in EFL Trophy) | 1 | 23 | 2 |
| Boston United | 2017–18 | National League North | 41 | 16 | 3 | 0 | — | | 5 (Note: Three appearances in Lincolnshire Senior Cup, two in FA Trophy) | 0 | 49 | 16 |
| AFC Fylde | 2018–19 | National League | 27 | 3 | 1 | 0 | — | | 0 | 0 | 28 | 3 |
| Altrincham (loan) | 2018–19 | National League North | 4 | 2 | 0 | 0 | — | | 1 (Note: Appearance(s) in FA Trophy) | 0 | 5 | 2 |
| Altrincham | 2019–20 | National League North | 8 | 1 | 3 | 0 | — | | 0 | 0 | 11 | 1 |
| Altrincham | Total | | 12 | 3 | 3 | 0 | 0 | 0 | 1 | 0 | 16 | 3 |
| Kidderminster Harriers | 2019–20 | National League North | 20 | 4 | 0 | 0 | — | | 1 | 0 | 21 | 4 |
| Kidderminster Harriers | 2020–21 | National League North | 15 | 6 | 1 | 1 | — | | 1 | 0 | 17 | 7 |
| Kidderminster Harriers | 2021–22 | National League North | 41 | 15 | 5 | 2 | — | | 3 (Note: Two appearances in FA Trophy and one appearance and goal in National League North play-offs) | 1 | 49 | 18 |
| Kidderminster Harriers | 2022–23 | National League North | 46 | 11 | 2 | 1 | — | | 6 (Note: Three appearances in FA Trophy and three appearance and three goals in National League North play-offs) | 3 | 54 | 15 |
| Kidderminster Harriers | 2023–24 | National League | 43 | 10 | 2 | 2 | — | | 3 | 3 | 48 | 15 |
| Kidderminster Harriers | 2024–25 | National League North | 44 | 30 | 1 | 0 | — | | 4 | 3 | 49 | 33 |
| Kidderminster Harriers | Total | | 209 | 76 | 11 | 6 | — | | 18 | 10 | 238 | 92 |
| Dagenham & Redbridge | 2025–26 | National League South | 18 | 5 | 2 | 0 | — | | 1 | 0 | 21 | 5 |
| Career total | | | 499 | 117 | 33 | 7 | 8 | 4 | 35 | 13 | 575 | 141 |

== Honours ==
England U17

- Nordic Cup third place: 2007

Kidderminster Harriers

- National League North play-offs: 2023

Individual

- Boston United Player of the Year: 2017–18
- National League North Player of the Season: 2024–25
- National League North Player of the Month: October 2021
- National League North Team of the Season: 2024–25
