= George Alexander (footballer) =

English footballer

Personal information
- Full name: George John Alexander
- Date of birth: 22 June 2001 (age 25)
- Place of birth: Bexley, England
- Position: Forward

Team information
- Current team: Farnham Town
- Number: 7

Youth career
- –2019: Millwall

Senior career*
Years	Team	Apps	(Gls)
2019–2021	Millwall	1	(0)
2021–2024	Bromley	38	(6)
2023	→ Welling United (loan)	11	(4)
2023	→ Slough Town (loan)	7	(6)
2023	→ Slough Town (loan)	15	(5)
2023–2024	→ Dartford (loan)	9	(2)
2024	Chelmsford City	16	(8)
2024–2026	Eastbourne Borough	67	(30)
2026	Hornchurch	11	(2)
2026	→ Chelmsford City (loan)	6	(4)
2026–	Farnham Town	6	(6)
- * Club domestic league appearances and goals as of 14:15, 20 November 2026 (UTC)

George John Alexander (born 22 June 2001) is an English footballer who plays for National League South club Farnham Town.

== Career ==
=== Millwall ===
Born in London, Alexander signed for Millwall at the age of seven. He spent twelve years in the Academy before making his first team debut in the last game of the season on 5 May 2019, coming on a late substitute in the 1–0 defeat to Wigan Athletic. He had previously been on the bench earlier in the season for an FA Cup tie with Everton.

=== Bromley ===
In August 2021, Alexander signed for National League club Bromley following a successful trial period.

==== Loans ====
On 2 February 2023, he joined National League South club Welling United on loan until the end of the season.

He made eleven appearances for the club, scoring four goals before being recalled and joining Slough Town on 23 March; the club he had scored a hat-trick against the previous month.

On 11 August 2023, Alexander rejoined National League South club Slough on loan until 1 January 2024.

On 23 November 2023, Alexander joined Dartford on loan for the rest of the 2023–24 season. Alexander was recalled by Bromley on 1 February 2024.

=== Chelmsford City ===
On 2 February 2024, Alexander signed for National League South side Chelmsford City on a permanent deal. Alexander scored his first goal for the club against Eastbourne Borough in a 3–0 victory.

=== Eastbourne Borough ===
On 7 May 2024, Alexander signed for Eastbourne Borough ahead of the 2024–25 season.

=== Hornchurch ===
On 19 March 2026, Alexander joined National League South side Hornchurch.

On 29 August 2026, Alexander returned to Chelmsford City on loan, following Hornchurch's promotion to the National League.

=== Farnham Town ===
On 9 October 2026, Alexander signed for National League South club Farnham Town for an undisclosed fee. On 24 October 2025, in his second game for the club, Alexander scored five goals for Farnham in a 6–0 win against Braintree Town.

== Personal life ==
Born into a family of Millwall fans, his father, Gary, was a professional footballer and played for the club for three years between 2007 and 2010.

== Career statistics ==
As of match played 14 March 2026

Club	Season	League			FA Cup		League Cup		Other		Total	
Club	Season	Division	Apps	Goals	Apps	Goals	Apps	Goals	Apps	Goals	Apps	Goals
Millwall	2018–19	Championship	1	0	0	0	0	0	0	0	1	0
Bromley	2021–22	National League	28	5	2	0	—		2 (Note: Appearance(s) in FA Trophy)	1	32	6
Bromley	2022–23	National League	9	1	0	0	—		0	0	9	1
Bromley	2023–24	National League	1	0	2	0	—		0	0	3	0
Bromley	Total		38	6	4	0	0	0	2	1	44	7
Welling United (loan)	2022–23	National League South	11	4	0	0	—		0	0	11	4
Slough Town (loan)	2022–23	National League South	7	6	0	0	—		0	0	7	6
Slough Town (loan)	2023–24	National League South	15	5	4	0	—		0	0	19	5
Dartford (loan)	2023–24	National League South	9	2	—		—		1 (Note: Appearance(s) in Kent Senior Cup)	0	10	2
Chelmsford City	2023–24	National League South	16	8	—		—		1 (Note: Appearance(s) in National League South play-offs)	1	17	9
Eastbourne Borough	2024–25	National League South	39	24	1	0	—		5 (Note: One appearance in National League South play-offs, two appearances in FA Trophy, two appearances and three goals in Sussex Senior Cup)	3	45	27
Eastbourne Borough	2025–26	National League South	28	6	1	0	—		0	0	29	6
Eastbourne Borough	Total		67	30	2	0	0	0	5	3	74	33
Career total			141	50	10	0	0	0	9	5	160	55

== Honours ==
Hornchurch

- National League South play-offs: 2026
