= Bradfords Group =

Building supplies company

The Bradfords Group
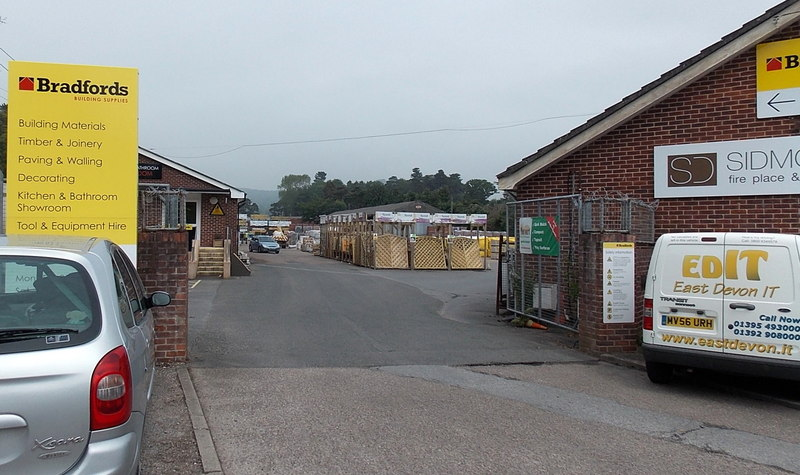
- Branch in Sidmouth, Devon
- Type: Privately owned company
- Industry: Building materials
- Founded: 1770
- Headquarters: Yeovil, England
- Operating income: £180 million
- Net income: £4 million
- Number of employees: 1100
- Website: www.bradfords.co.uk

The Bradfords Group is a building supplies company with headquarters in Yeovil, Somerset. The business trades as Bradfords Building Supplies and Yeovil Plumbing Supplies in over 40 UK locations. In the year just ended (2018–2019)

== History ==
There were Bradfords in Wiltshire from at least the 16th century. William Bradford, who was born in 1750 and lived at Thorney, married Ann Richards in 1782: she worked with her husband in running their business, which included coal merchants and quarries, until he died in 1806. Shortly after this she was joined by her son Job until her death in 1819.

In 1853 the Great Western Railway line was opened from Taunton to Yeovil, and Jabez Bradford started the Yeovil branch of the business. GWR came to an agreement with the Bradford family for sidings to be built near Yeovil Station;
