= Jordan Seabright =

English footballer

Personal information
- Full name: Jordan Seabright
- Date of birth: 1 May 1994 (age 32)
- Place of birth: Poole, England
- Height: 6 ft 2 in (1.88 m)
- Position: Goalkeeper

Senior career*
Years	Team	Apps	(Gls)
2010–2011	Poole Town	1	(0)
2011–2012	Bournemouth	0	(0)
2012–2014	Dagenham & Redbridge	8	(0)
2014–2015	Torquay United	6	(0)
2015	Poole Town	1	(0)
2015	Gosport Borough	1	(0)
2017–2018	Weymouth	19	(0)
- * Club domestic league appearances and goals as of 20:25, 23 February 2021 (UTC)

Jordan Seabright (born 1 May 1994) is an English semi-professional footballer who plays as a goalkeeper.

== Career ==
Born in Poole, Dorset, Seabright was with Poole Town and Bournemouth before signing a one-year contract with Dagenham in August 2012. He made his Dagenham début on 3 November 2012 in the FA Cup in a 4–0 away defeat to his old club Bournemouth, coming on as a second-half substitute for regular goalkeeper, Chris Lewington.

He later made his league début in March, once again coming on for regular goalkeeper Chris Lewington away at Fleetwood Town. This was followed up two weeks later by his full league début away at Exeter City, where Dagenham clinched 1–0 win and Seabright secured his first clean sheet in professional football. Seabright signed for newly relegated Conference Premier team Torquay United on a one-year contract on 2 July 2014. Seabright made his first début for Torquay United against Aldershot in the FA Cup 4th round qualifying. After a good performance Seabright was able to maintain his spot for the following game at Kidderminster Harriers. Seabright managed to keep his second clean sheet of his career against Welling United on 28 December 2014 since then he kept another clean sheet against Bromley in the FA Trophy.

In February 2015, Seabright announced his retirement from football, deciding to begin a new career as a car salesman. However, in November 2015, Seabright joined Gosport Borough when first choice 'keeper Nathan Ashmore was injured.

== Career statistics ==
As of match played 24 November 2015.

Appearances and goals by club, season and competition
Club	Season	League			FA Cup		League Cup		Other		Total	
Club	Season	Division	Apps	Goals	Apps	Goals	Apps	Goals	Apps	Goals	Apps	Goals
Dagenham & Redbridge	2012–13	League Two	4	0	1	0	0	0	0	0	5	0
Dagenham & Redbridge	2013–14	League Two	4	0	0	0	0	0	2 (Note: Appearance in Football League Trophy)	0	6	0
Dagenham & Redbridge	Total		8	0	1	0	0	0	2	0	11	0
Torquay United	2014–15	Conference Premier	6	0	1	0	—		1 (Note: Appearance in FA Trophy)	0	8	0
Poole Town	2014–15	SL Premier Division	1	0	—		—		0	0	1	0
Poole Town	2015–16	SL Premier Division	0	0	0	0	—		—		0	0
Poole Town	Total		1	0	0	0	—		0	0	1	0
Gosport Borough	2015–16	National League South	1	0	—		—		0	0	1	0
Career total			16	0	2	0	0	0	3	0	21	0
