= Scott Bartlett (football manager) =

English football manager

Personal information
- Date of birth: 30 May 1979 (age 47)
- Place of birth: Salisbury, United Kingdom
- Position: Midfielder

Youth career
- AFC Bournemouth

Senior career*
Years	Team	Apps	(Gls)
- Cirencester Town
2000–2009	Salisbury City		
2009-2010	Weston-super-Mare		
2010	Bath City	10	
2010–2011	Forest Green Rovers		

Managerial career
- 2016-2017: Weston-super-Mare
- 2019-25: Weston-super-Mare
- 2025-26: Eastleigh FC
- 2026–: Bath City
- * Club domestic league appearances and goals

Scott Bartlett (born 30 May 1970) is a former footballer and current first team manager of Bath City.

== Playing career ==
Scott Bartlett's first footballing contract was with AFC Bournemouth.

Bartlett played for Salisbury City F.C. more than 400 times over nine years, during which time he helped win the club promotion.

He moved to Weston-super-Mare in 2009 and became Seagulls' captain.

Towards the end of his playing career, Bartlett had an injury-hit seasons with Bath City F.C. and then Forest Green Rovers F.C..

== Coaching career ==
Following his retirement from playing, due to injury problems, at Forest Green Rovers, Bartlett became manager of the Gloucestershire club's youth academy. He was also temporarily Forest Green's caretaker first team manager.

Bartlett began the first of two managerial spells with Weston-super-Mare A.F.C. in 2016, taking charge of the team for 35 matches. He returned to the club in the summer of 2019. His Weston-super-Mare side won the Somerset Premier Cup in 2019 and 2025, and gained promotion to the National League South after winning the Southern League Premier South in 2023.

In the interim between his two periods managing Weston, he returned to his previous role as academy lead at Forest Green Rovers.

Bartlett left Weston to become manager of Eastleigh FC in September 2025 after the latter met the terms of his release clause. He was let go by the club just five months later in February 2026.

In March 2026 Bartlett was confirmed as the new first team coach of Bath City.
