= George Porter (footballer) =

English footballer (born 1992)

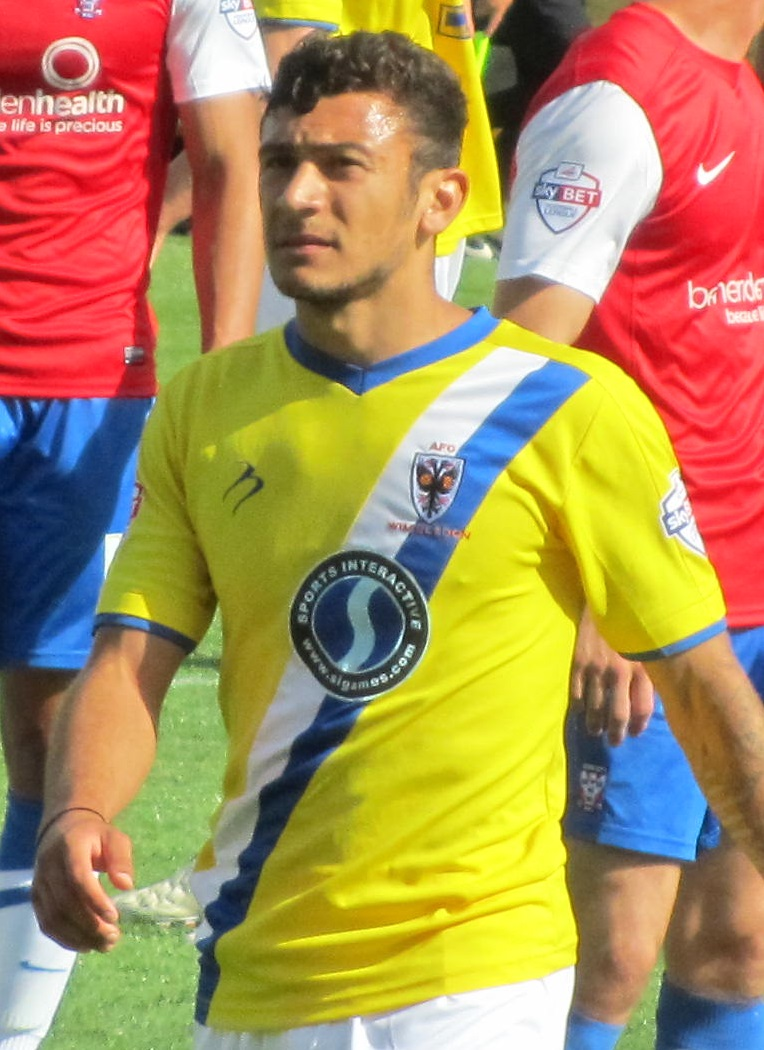
- Porter playing for AFC Wimbledon in 2013

Personal information
- Full name: George Edwards Porter
- Date of birth: 27 June 1992 (age 34)
- Place of birth: Sidcup, England
- Height: 1.78 m (5 ft 10 in)
- Positions: Attacking midfielder; striker

Team information
- Current team: Beckenham Town

Youth career
- –2009: Cray Wanderers

Senior career*
| Years | Team | Apps | (Gls) |
| 2009–2010 | Cray Wanderers | 35 | (7) |
| 2010–2012 | Leyton Orient | 35 | (1) |
| 2010–2011 | → Lewes (loan) | 10 | (1) |
| 2011 | → Hastings United (loan) | 16 | (2) |
| 2012–2014 | Burnley | 0 | (0) |
| 2013 | → Colchester United (loan) | 19 | (1) |
| 2013–2014 | → AFC Wimbledon (loan) | 21 | (0) |
| 2014 | Rochdale | 2 | (0) |
| 2014–2015 | Dagenham & Redbridge | 19 | (1) |
| 2015 | Maidstone United | 13 | (0) |
| 2015–2016 | Welling United | 29 | (1) |
| 2016–2019 | Bromley | 119 | (20) |
| 2020–2021 | Maidstone United | 12 | (4) |
| 2021–2022 | Dartford | 27 | (4) |
| 2022–2023 | Dulwich Hamlet | 39 | (12) |
| 2023–2024 | Cray Wanderers | 26 | (5) |
| 2024–2025 | Dulwich Hamlet | 34 | (4) |
| 2025- | Beckenham Town | 10 | (1) |
- * Club domestic league appearances and goals as of 09:24, 6 October 2025 (UTC)

George Edwards Porter (born 27 June 1992) is an English professional footballer who plays as either a winger or a striker for Beckenham Town.

== Career ==
=== Cray Wanderers ===
Born in Sidcup, Porter joined Isthmian League Premier Division side Cray Wanderers for the 2009–10 season. After playing several games for the academy at Coopers Technology College in Chislehurst, Porter was promoted to the first team, making his debut in the FA Cup. His first goal for Cray came in a 3–2 win over Margate. After impressive performances for the first team, Porter attracted interest from several Football League teams including Charlton Athletic, Gillingham, Dagenham & Redbridge and Leyton Orient. He left Cray Wanderers after playing 41 games and scoring 11 goals in all competitions. His success was rewarded with the Manager's Player of the Year award.

=== Leyton Orient ===
Porter joined Leyton Orient on a two-week trial in May 2010, playing in several reserve games, and he was signed by the O's in May 2010. He made his first appearance in an Orient shirt in a friendly match against his old club on 14 July 2010, winning a penalty in a 2–0 win. His league debut came in the 3–1 defeat at home to Charlton Athletic on 13 August, when he appeared as a substitute.

On 29 October 2010, after a period of illness, Porter signed on a month's loan to Conference South club Lewes. He made his debut for the Rooks on 30 October, in the 1–1 draw with Dartford. In his next game, a 3–0 win at Weston-super-Mare, Porter scored his first goal for Lewes, but was later sent off. Porter's Lewes loan was extended, but at the end of January 2011, he went on loan to Hastings United, where he made his debut in the 2–2 draw at home to Folkestone Invicta on 1 February. He scored his first goal for Hastings in the 3–2 victory over Tooting & Mitcham United on 12 February. At the end of the season, Porter returned to Orient and scored a hat-trick for the O's in a 5–0 demolition of Finnish second division side SJK during their pre-season tour of Finland.

He made his first start for Orient and scored his first professional goal on 17 September 2011, in the 3–1 defeat at home to Oldham Athletic. A string of impressive performances, including a goal in his FA Cup début against Bromley, soon saw him attract interest from the likes of Nottingham Forest and Ipswich Town. On 23 May 2012 Porter rejected a two-year contract offer from Leyton Orient leaving the club to expect his departure.

=== Burnley ===
On 3 July 2012, Porter signed for Football League Championship club Burnley on a three-year contract. Porter picked up an injury before the start of the season.

=== Colchester United ===
He signed on a youth loan for Colchester United on 1 January 2013 until the end of the season and made his début the same day, coming on after 73 minutes as a sub in the 3–0 defeat at Crawley.

=== AFC Wimbledon ===
On 18 July 2013, it was announced that Porter had joined League Two side AFC Wimbledon on a season-long loan deal. AFC Wimbledon manager Neal Ardley said of Porter joining "The Dons" that "the pacy forward is likely to be utilised on the flank" and "George is very quick and direct; he will give us real high energy and creativity in the final third", with Porter himself stating that he "cannot wait to get started at AFC Wimbledon having been impressed by the club's support in the past". Porter made his first appearance for "The Dons" two days later in a pre-season friendly game against Conference South side Sutton United at Gander Green Lane that resulted in a 4–0 win. However, he was substituted after only six minutes due to an injury, though this did look more precautionary than anything serious. On 24 January 2014, Porter returned to Burnley early from his loan after falling out of favour at Wimbledon, amid rumours of a training ground bust up with manager Neal Ardley. He made a total of 24 appearances scoring no goals.

=== 2014–15 ===
On 31 January 2014, Porter signed for Rochdale on a short-term deal until the end of the season, following his departure from Burnley. He subsequently joined League Two club Dagenham & Redbridge before returning to the Isthmian League Premier Division and joining leaders Maidstone United.

=== Welling United ===
In July 2015, he signed for National League side Welling United on a free transfer.

=== Bromley and 12 month ban ===
In June 2016, Porter signed for fellow National League side Bromley following his departure from relegated Welling United. Despite missing a considerable period through injury, Porter made 31 league appearances, scoring 6 goals, and was rewarded with a new one-year contract at the end of the season.

In September 2019, Porter was banned from football for 12 months after pleading guilty to placing 473 bets on football matches, an activity which is banned by the FA. He was also fined £750. He was initially reported to the FA by betting company Bet365 for placing the bets between December 2011 and May 2019. Porter made a loss on the bets and did not bet on matches involving his own teams, and was not accused of match fixing.

=== Return to Maidstone ===
After his ban, Porter re-signed for Maidstone in late September 2020.

=== Dartford ===
On 8 June 2021, Porter signed for Dartford.

=== Dulwich Hamlet ===
On 1 July 2022, Porter signed for Dulwich Hamlet.

=== Cray Wanderers (second spell) ===
On 16 June 2023, Porter re-signed for Cray Wanderers.

=== Return to Dulwich Hamlet ===
On 5 July 2024, Porter returned to Dulwich Hamlet. Porter started the season brightly putting in eye-catching displays scoring in victories at Champion Hill against Hendon and his former club Cray Wanderers.

== Career statistics ==
As of match played 27 April 2024

Appearances and goals by club, season and competition
| Club | Season | League | | | FA Cup | | League Cup | | Other | | Total | |
| Club | Season | Division | Apps | Goals | Apps | Goals | Apps | Goals | Apps | Goals | Apps | Goals |
|---|---|---|---|---|---|---|---|---|---|---|---|---|
| Cray Wanderers | 2009–10 | IL Premier Division | 35 | 7 | 0 | 0 | — | | 0 | 0 | 35 | 7 |
| Leyton Orient | 2010–11 | League One | 1 | 0 | 0 | 0 | 0 | 0 | 0 | 0 | 1 | 0 |
| Leyton Orient | 2011–12 | League One | 34 | 1 | 2 | 1 | 2 | 0 | 1 (Note: Appearance in Football League Trophy) | 0 | 39 | 2 |
| Leyton Orient | Total | | 35 | 1 | 2 | 1 | 2 | 0 | 1 | 0 | 40 | 2 |
| Lewes (loan) | 2010–11 | Conference South | 10 | 1 | — | | — | | — | | 10 | 1 |
| Hastings United (loan) | 2010–11 | IL Premier Division | 16 | 2 | — | | — | | — | | 16 | 2 |
| Burnley | 2012–13 | Championship | 0 | 0 | 0 | 0 | 0 | 0 | — | | 0 | 0 |
| Burnley | 2013–14 | Championship | 0 | 0 | — | | — | | — | | 0 | 0 |
| Burnley | Total | | 0 | 0 | 0 | 0 | 0 | 0 | — | | 0 | 0 |
| Colchester United (loan) | 2012–13 | League One | 19 | 1 | — | | — | | — | | 19 | 1 |
| AFC Wimbledon (loan) | 2013–14 | League Two | 21 | 0 | 1 | 0 | 1 | 0 | 1 | 0 | 24 | 0 |
| Rochdale | 2013–14 | League Two | 2 | 0 | — | | — | | — | | 2 | 0 |
| Dagenham & Redbridge | 2014–15 | League Two | 19 | 1 | 2 | 0 | 1 | 1 | 1 | 0 | 23 | 2 |
| Maidstone United | 2014–15 | IL Premier Division | 13 | 0 | 0 | 0 | 0 | 0 | 0 | 0 | 13 | 0 |
| Welling United | 2015–16 | National League | 29 | 1 | 2 | 0 | — | | 2 (Note: Appearances in FA Trophy) | 2 | 33 | 3 |
| Bromley | 2016–17 | National League | 32 | 6 | 0 | 0 | — | | 3 | 1 | 35 | 7 |
| Bromley | 2017–18 | National League | 38 | 6 | 0 | 0 | — | | 8 | 2 | 46 | 8 |
| Bromley | 2018–19 | National League | 44 | 9 | 2 | 0 | — | | 1 | 1 | 47 | 10 |
| Bromley | 2019–20 | National League | 5 | 0 | — | | — | | — | | 5 | 0 |
| Bromley | Total | | 119 | 20 | 2 | 0 | — | | 12 | 4 | 133 | 24 |
| Maidstone United | 2020–21 | National League South | 12 | 4 | 2 | 0 | — | | 3 | 2 | 15 | 6 |
| Dartford | 2021–22 | National League South | 27 | 4 | 2 | 0 | — | | 9 (Note: Three appearances in the London Senior Cup) (Note: Four appearances in the Kent Senior Cup) (Note: Two appearances in the FA Trophy) | 2 | 38 | 6 |
| Dulwich Hamlet | 2022–23 | National League South | 39 | 12 | 0 | 0 | — | | 1 (Note: One appearance in the FA Trophy) | 0 | 40 | 12 |
| Cray Wanderers | 2023–24 | IL Premier Division | 26 | 5 | 3 | 0 | — | | 2 (Note: One appearance in the FA Trophy) (Note: One appearance in the London Senior Cup) | 0 | 31 | 5 |
| Career total | | | 422 | 59 | 16 | 1 | 4 | 1 | 32 | 10 | 474 | 71 |

== Honours ==
Bromley

- FA Trophy runner-up: 2017–18

Dartford

- Kent Senior Cup: 2019–20
