= Sean Shields =

British professional footballer (born 1992)

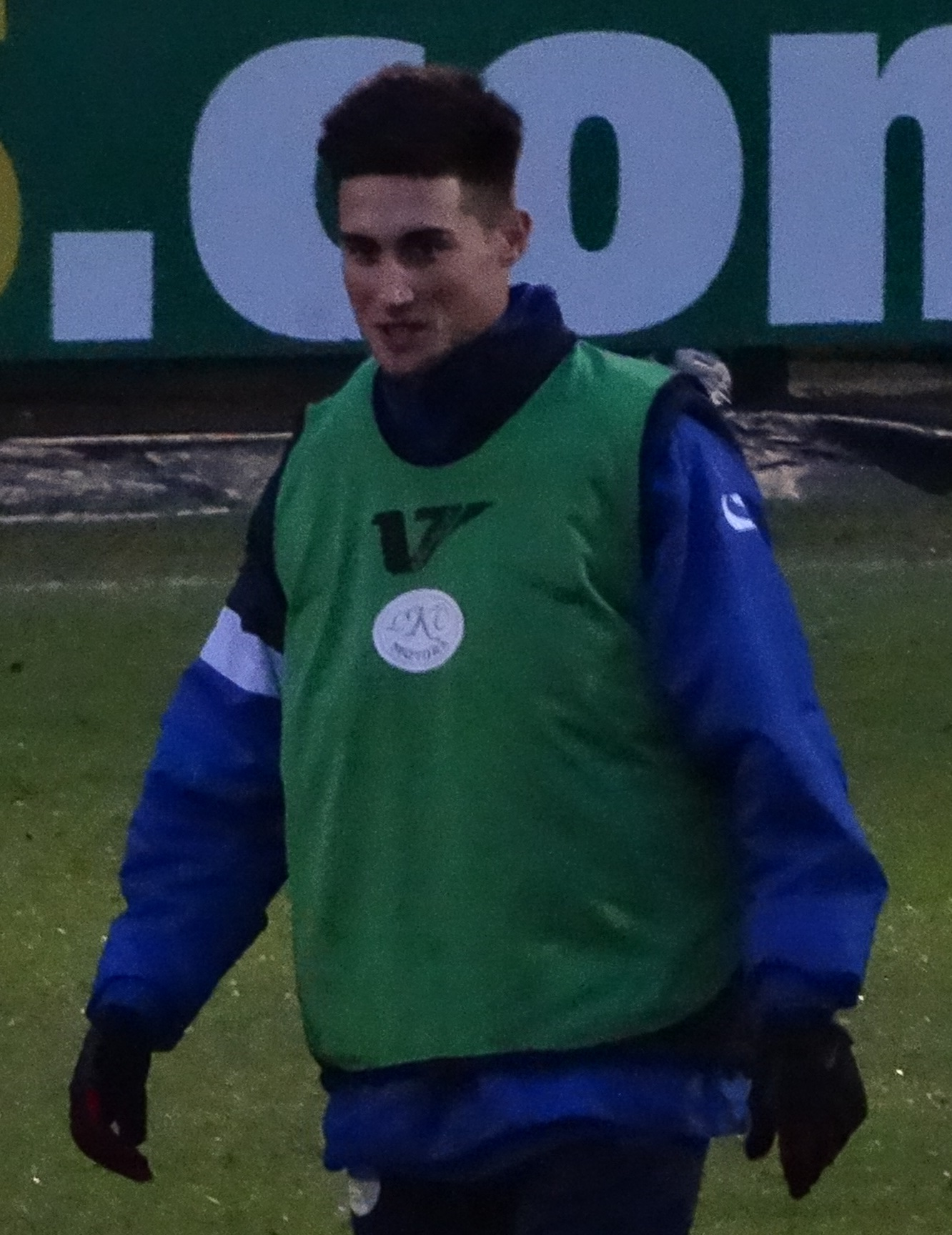
- Shields training with Dagenham & Redbridge in 2014

Personal information
- Full name: Sean Patrick Shields
- Date of birth: 20 January 1992 (age 34)
- Place of birth: Enfield, England
- Height: 1.79 m (5 ft 10 1/2 in)
- Position: Winger

Team information
- Current team: Tonbridge Angels

Youth career
- 2000–2008: Tottenham Hotspur
- 2009-2010: Rushden & Diamonds

Senior career*
Years	Team	Apps	(Gls)
2009–2010	Rushden & Diamonds	0	(0)
2010–2013	St Albans City	71	(13)
2013–2015	Dagenham & Redbridge	13	(0)
2014	→ St Albans City (loan)	13	(4)
2014–2015	→ Ebbsfleet United (loan)	5	(1)
2015–2020	Ebbsfleet United	116	(15)
2015	→ Chelmsford City (loan)	2	(0)
2015	→ Margate (loan)	6	(1)
2016	→ Hemel Hempstead Town (loan)	5	(1)
2018–2019	→ Maidstone United (loan)	4	(0)
2019	→ Boreham Wood (loan)	10	(1)
2019–2020	→ Notts County (loan)	14	(0)
2020–2022	Weymouth	66	(7)
2022–2023	Barnet	18	(3)
2023	Scunthorpe United	10	(0)
2023	Rayners Lane	7	(10)
2023–	Tonbridge Angels	80	(20)

International career
2013	Northern Ireland U21	2	(0)
- * Club domestic league appearances and goals as of 18:49, 12 September 2024 (UTC)

Sean Patrick Shields (born 20 January 1992) is a British professional footballer who plays as a midfielder for Tonbridge Angels.

== Career ==
Shields started his career in the youth system at Tottenham Hotpsur, spending eight years with the club between 2000 and 2008. He then joined Isthmian League side Potters Bar Town, where he was spotted by Football Conference side Rushden & Diamonds as a 16-year-old and was offered a trial at Nene Park. He was offered apprentice terms at the club, and went on to score 18 goals in his first season with the youth team. He made his first team debut on 12 October 2009 as a 17-year-old, against Daventry United in the Northamptonshire Senior Cup. In March 2010, he decided to leave the Diamonds and re-joined Potters Bar Town for a very brief spell until the end of the season.

In October 2010, he joined Conference South side St Albans City on a one-year contract after a trial period with the club. Shields broke into the first team during the 2010–11 season after a string of impressive performances in the reserve side. However, he could not stop the club from relegation to the Southern Football League Premier Division in the summer of 2011. He rose to prominence during an FA Cup second qualifying-round match against Ashford Town, scoring a first-half hat-trick in a 6–2 victory, which resulted in Shields being nominated for the player of the round. Shields went on to make a total of 92 appearances for the Saints, scoring 21 goals, in all competitions.

On 9 January 2013, he joined Football League Two side Dagenham & Redbridge on a three-and-a-half-year contract until June 2016, after impressing during a short trial with the club. He made his debut on 26 January 2013, in the 2–1 league defeat to Morecambe, replacing Medy Elito as a second-half substitute. It proved to be his only appearance of the campaign for the Daggers. Shields, started the 2013–14 season as a back-up player, making his first league start for Dagenham in a 1–1 draw with Chesterfield. In his first full season with the club he made thirteen appearances.

In August 2014, he re-joined his former club Conference South side St Albans City on a two-month loan, having failed to break into the first team after missing the majority of the 2014 pre-season through injury. In October 2014 his loan was extended for a further month after an anonymous St Albans fan funded the deal, having been impressed with his form. In November 2014, he returned to Dagenham having scored five goals in sixteen appearances in all competitions, 13 of which were starts.

In December 2014 he moved out on loan again to the Conference South, signing for Ebbsfleet United on a one-month loan deal. It didn't take him long to get off the mark, as on Boxing Day 2014, Shields scored his first goal for Ebbsfleet United on only his second appearance for the club. It came in an impressive 5–1 away victory over Chelmsford City and came by means of a delicate 20-yard lob over the goalkeeper and opposition defender on the goal-line. In January 2015, his contract at Dagenham was cancelled by mutual consent, having made fourteen appearances for the club in all competitions. He immediately returned to Ebbsfleet on a permanent deal, signing an 18-month contract. After suffering an ankle injury during the final week of pre season in July 2015, Shields missed the first two months of the 2015/16 season. Consequently, on 2 October 2015, Shields joined Chelmsford City on a one-month loan deal from Ebbsfleet United.

On 3 December 2015 Shields signed a one-month loan deal at Margate under Terry Brown. He enjoyed a very successful loan spell, helping the team climb the table with a positive run of results over the Christmas period. He became an instant hit with the Margate fans with his trickery and exciting style of play. His first goal came by means of a free kick against Maidenhead United on his final game on loan for the club, on 9 January 2016.

Shields later joined Hemel Hempstead on loan, before returning to his parent club in time to play a part in the backend of the Fleet's campaign. Despite scoring against Hemel Hempstead, and getting the equaliser in a 3–1 win over Chelmsford in which he was voted man of the match, he did not feature in the subsequent playoffs which was believed to be due to suffering a hamstring strain in training before the final game of the season, against Eastbourne Borough.

However, his performances while on loan and when recalled back to play for the Fleet were impressive enough to earn him a new deal with the club, which he signed in June 2016.

Shields began the 16/17 season in fine form, scoring a superb individual goal, again against Hemel Hempstead in a 2–2 draw at Stonebridge Road. Shortly after this game and after a change in team shape, Shields adopted a left wing-back role which saw him and the team flourish during a positive run of results. This position saw the tricky wing-back pop up with regular assists for teammates and 2 more goals followed before the end of November against Truro City and Maidenhead United, respectively. He was part of the squad that finished second in the National League South that season and went on to win promotion through the playoffs.

Shields was a regular feature in the matchday squad in the 2017–18 season, but after a change in management, his game time subsequently diminished in his final two years with the club. He was loaned out to Maidstone United and Boreham Wood from December 2018 until the end of the 2018–19 season.

After a summer of interest from several clubs, he agreed a season long loan deal with Notts County for 2019–20. Upon signing here, it was agreed that Shields would leave Ebbsfleet at the end of the season, when his contract expired.

Shields signed for Weymouth on 13 October 2020 and made his debut against Barnet the same day. He scored his first goal for the club, a fine strike from the edge of the box into the top corner, against Chesterfield on 28 November 2020.

Shields enjoyed a fine first season with the club scoring 5 and assisting 14 goals, in 33 league games. On 18 May 2021, he was awarded the Player's Player of the season award.

On 1 July 2022, Shields signed for Barnet on a permanent contract after Weymouth’s relegation. He quickly became a fan favorite among the Bees with his creativity and exciting style of play. He scored 3 goals and registered 3 assists in his first 10 league appearances for the new club

On 2 February 2023, he joined Scunthorpe United on a deal until the end of the season, with the club sitting second bottom of the National League at the time. The incentive of an extra year would be triggered, if the club were able to avoid relegation and remain in the National League. Unfortunately this was not an achieved and following Scunthorpe's relegation, he left the club at the expiration of his contract to return to London.

== International career ==
Shields was born in the London Borough of Enfield, but qualifies to play for Northern Ireland through his father, who was brought up in the country. In May 2013, the Irish Football Association got in touch with Dagenham & Redbridge about a possible call-up for Shields to the under-21 squad. In May 2013, Shields was called up for the 2015 UEFA European Under-21 Championship qualifier against Cyprus in Nicosia, after impressing in a three-day training camp. Shields made his debut in the 3–0 defeat, replacing Jude Winchester as a substitute. His second appearance came in September 2013, a 1–0 defeat to Belgium, where he again featured, this time replacing Kirk Millar as a half-time substitute.

== Career statistics ==
As of 14 October 2023

Appearances and goals by club, season and competition
Club	Season	League			FA Cup		League Cup		Other		Total	
Club	Season	Division	Apps	Goals	Apps	Goals	Apps	Goals	Apps	Goals	Apps	Goals
Rushden & Diamonds	2009–10	Conference Premier	0	0	0	0	—		2 (Note: 2 appearances in Northamptonshire Senior Cup)	0	2	0
St Albans City	2010–11	Conference South	24	0	3	0	—		3 (Note: 2 appearances in FA Trophy, 1 appearance in Herts Senior Cup)	0	30	0
St Albans City	2011–12	SL Premier Division	28	6	4	0	—		4 (Note: 1 appearance in FA Trophy, 1 appearance in Herts Senior Cup, 1 appearance in Herts Charity Cup, 1 appearance in Southern League Cup)	0	36	6
St Albans City	2012–13	SL Premier Division	19	7	3	4	—		4	0	26	11
St Albans City	Total		71	13	10	4	—		11	0	92	17
Dagenham & Redbridge	2012–13	League Two	1	0	—		—		—		1	0
Dagenham & Redbridge	2013–14	League Two	12	0	0	0	0	0	1 (Note: Appearance in Football League Trophy)	0	13	0
Dagenham & Redbridge	Total		13	0	0	0	0	0	1	0	14	0
St Albans City (loan)	2014–15	Conference South	13	4	3	1	—		0	0	16	5
Ebbsfleet United (loan)	2014–15	Conference South	5	1	—		—		1 (Note: Appearance in FA Trophy)	0	6	1
Ebbsfleet United	2014–15	Conference South	13	0	—		—		0	0	13	0
Ebbsfleet United	2015–16	National League South	7	2	—		—		1 (Note: Appearance in Kent Senior Cup)	0	8	2
Ebbsfleet United	2016–17	National League South	39	6	1	0	—		4 (Note: Three appearances in FA Trophy, one appearance in National League South playoffs)	0	44	6
Ebbsfleet United	2017–18	National League	34	4	3	0	—		4 (Note: Three appearances and one goal in FA Trophy, one appearance in Kent Senior Cup)	1	41	5
Ebbsfleet United	2018–19	National League	17	3	2	0	—		0	0	19	3
Ebbsfleet United	2019–20	National League	6	0	0	0	—		0	0	6	0
Ebbsfleet United	Total		121	16	6	0	—		10	1	137	17
Chelmsford City (loan)	2015–16	National League South	2	0	1	0	—		—		3	0
Margate (loan)	2015–16	National League South	6	1	—		—		—		6	1
Hemel Hempstead Town (loan)	2015–16	National League South	5	1	—		—		—		5	1
Maidstone United (loan)	2018–19	National League	4	0	—		—		2	1	6	1
Boreham Wood (loan)	2018–19	National League	10	1	—		—		—		10	1
Notts County (loan)	2019–20	National League	14	0	2	0	—		4	0	20	0
Weymouth	2020–21	National League	33	5	1	0	—		1	0	35	5
Weymouth	2021–22	National League	33	2	2	0	—		2	0	37	2
Weymouth	Total		66	7	3	0	—		3	0	72	7
Barnet	2022–23	National League	18	3	1	0	—		2 (Note: One appearance in FA Trophy, one appearance in Middlesex Senior Cup)	0	20	3
Scunthorpe United	2022–23	National League	10	0	0	0	—		0	0	10	0
Rayners Lane	2023–24	CCL Premier League North	7	9	0	0	—		1 (Note: Appearance in Middlesex Senior Cup)	1	8	10
Tonbridge Angels	2023–24	National League South	2	2	0	0	—		0	0	2	2
Career total			361	54	26	5	0	0	35	3	422	64
