= 2006–07 Birmingham City F.C. season =

Birmingham City F.C.
2006–07 season
- Chairman: David Gold
- Manager: Steve Bruce
- Ground: St Andrew's
- Championship: 2nd (promoted)
- FA Cup: Fourth round
- League Cup: Fourth round
- Top goalscorer: League: Gary McSheffrey (13); All: Gary McSheffrey (16)
- Highest home attendance: 29,431 vs Queens Park Rangers, 26 December 2006
- Lowest home attendance: 10,491 vs Wrexham, League Cup 2nd round, 19 September 2006
- Average home league attendance: 22,273

The 2006–07 season was Birmingham City Football Club's 104th consecutive season played in the English football league system, their 46th in the second tier of English football, and their first season at that level under the name of the Football League Championship. Managed by Steve Bruce, Birmingham were promoted back to the Premier League after just one season in the Championship. They reached the fourth round of both the 2006–07 FA Cup and League Cup. The 2006–07 season also marked the 100th anniversary of the first match held at their St Andrew's stadium.

Gary McSheffrey was top scorer with 16 goals, of which 13 were scored in the league.

== Pre-season ==
=== Pre-season friendlies ===
Date	Opponents	Venue	Result	Score F–A	Scorers	Attendance	Report
8 July 2006	Burton Albion	A	W	5–1	Campbell (4) 6' 86' 88' 90', Jerome 48'		
22 July 2006	Tottenham Hotspur	H	L	0–2			
29 July 2006	AS Nancy	H	D	1–1	Forssell		

== Season review ==
Birmingham returned straight back to the Premier League by finishing second in The Championship thereby gaining automatic promotion. The team had started the season inconsistently leaving them in ninth position after the 0–1 defeat to Norwich City on 17 November. This led to supporters calling for the sacking of manager Steve Bruce, but the board held firm and the team pulled themselves around. The year finished with Birmingham topping the table by nine points after dropping only seven points in 15 games since the defeat against Norwich.

Boxing Day saw the centenary of the opening of St Andrew's. Queens Park Rangers were the team to visit on the historic day, and Birmingham marked the occasion by defeating their rivals 2–1. Many fans also hoped that the 'curse of the gypsies' would finally be dispelled from the stadium, and at last the team could make their mark on English football.

The FA Cup saw Birmingham overturn Newcastle United away from home that was undoubtedly the result of the season. Goals from Gary McSheffrey, Bruno Ngotty, Sebastian Larsson, DJ Campbell, and an own goal by former Aston Villa midfielder Nolberto Solano gave Birmingham a 5–1 victory at St James' Park. Blues went on to lose in the next round to Reading.

Birmingham once again returned to some inconsistent form, but a run of good results after the Easter games against Burnley and Barnsley saw them climb back to the top of the table with one game to go, and after Crystal Palace beat Derby County, promotion was secured. The only thing left to be sorted out was who would win the league, Birmingham or Sunderland? Blues had a one-point lead, but after a defeat to Preston North End and a victory for Sunderland, Blues were confined to finishing second. But promotion back to the big time was secured.

The end of season awards ceremony, held at the Hilton Birmingham Metropole Hotel, saw Stephen Clemence win the player of the season and players' player of the season awards. Fabrice Muamba was chosen young player of the season, and Krystian Pearce was the Academy player of the season. Sebastian Larsson's goal against Sheffield Wednesday on 28 April was chosen goal of the season, and the breakthrough award, sponsored by the local radio station, went to goalkeeper Colin Doyle, whose penalty save against Wolverhampton Wanderers in April earned him the "magic moment" award. The season ended with the club recording the most league wins (26) in a season.

== The Championship ==
=== Match details ===
Date	League position	Opponents	Venue	Result	Score F–A	Scorers	Attendance	Report
5 August 2006	4th	Colchester United	H	W	2–1	Campbell 30', Bendtner 79'	24,238	
9 August 2006	4th	Sunderland	A	W	1–0	Forssell 40' pen.	26,668	
12 August 2006	4th	Stoke City	A	D	0–0		12,347	
19 August 2006	1st	Crystal Palace	H	W	2–1	Bendtner 23', Larsson 90'	20,223	
26 August 2006	4th	Cardiff City	A	L	0–2		20,109	
9 September 2006	2nd	Hull City	H	W	2–1	Campbell 16', Bendtner 53'	19,228	
12 September 2006	1st	Queens Park Rangers	A	W	2–0	Ngotty 23', Jerome 90'	10,936	
16 September 2006	2nd	Ipswich Town	H	D	2–2	Campbell 74', Dunn 86'	20,841	
23 September 2006	2nd	Leeds United	A	L	2–3	Warner 13' o.g., Bendtner 74'	18,898	
30 September 2006	2nd	Leicester City	H	D	1–1	McSheffrey 58'	18,002	
14 October 2006	6th	Luton Town	A	L	2–3	Campbell 14' Danns 66'	9,275	
17 October 2006	9th	Norwich City	H	L	0–1		20,537	
21 October 2006	8th	Derby County	A	W	1–0	Clemence 84'	25,673	
28 October 2006	6th	West Bromwich Albion	H	W	2–0	McSheffrey (2) 19', 90'	21,009	
31 October 2006	4th	Coventry City	A	W	1–0	Bendtner 26'	27,212	
4 November 2006	4th	Plymouth Argyle	A	W	1–0	Jaïdi 75'	17,008	
11 November 2006	3rd	Barnsley	H	W	2–0	McSheffrey 35', Danns 90'	19,344	
18 November 2006	3rd	Wolverhampton Wanderers	H	D	1–1	McSheffrey 30'	22,256	
25 November 2006	3rd	Burnley	A	W	2–1	Bendtner 15', Campbell 83'	12,889	
29 November 2006	3rd	Southampton	A	L	3–4	Jerome 68', Bendtner 72', Jaïdi 90'	21,889	
2 December 2006	1st	Plymouth Argyle	H	W	3–0	Bendtner 21', Upson 30', McSheffrey 41'	22,592	
9 December 2006	1st	Preston North End	H	W	3–1	McSheffrey (3) 32', 40', 89' pen.	23,159	
16 December 2006	1st	Sheffield Wednesday	A	W	3–0	Clemence 42', McSheffrey 65', Jerome 90'	26,083	
23 December 2006	1st	Southend United	A	W	4–0	Campbell 8', Clemence 38', McSheffrey 54', Jaïdi 84'	9,781	
26 December 2006	1st	Queens Park Rangers	H	W	2–1	Upson 22', Jerome 62'	29,431	
29 December 2006	1st	Luton Town	H	D	2–2	McSheffrey 31', Danns 90'	24,642	
1 January 2007	1st	Ipswich Town	A	L	0–1		22,436	
30 January 2007	2nd	Southend United	H	L	1–3	Clarke 9' o.g.	19,177	
3 February 2007	4th	Colchester United	A	D	1–1	Clemence 66'	5,918	
11 February 2007	2nd	Stoke City	H	W	1–0	McSheffrey 71'	15,854	
17 February 2007	2nd	Crystal Palace	A	W	1–0	Jerome 34'	17,233	
20 February 2007	3rd	Sunderland	H	D	1–1	Campbell 90'	20,941	
24 February 2007	3rd	Hull City	A	L	0–2		18,811	
27 February 2007	1st	Leeds United	H	W	1–0	Bendtner 15'	18,363	
4 March 2007	1st	Cardiff City	H	W	1–0	Larsson 56'	28,223	
9 March 2007	1st	Derby County	H	W	1–0	Vine 45'	20,962	
13 March 2007	1st	Norwich City	A	L	0–1		23,504	
18 March 2007	2nd	West Bromwich Albion	A	D	1–1	D. Johnson 86'	21,434	
1 April 2007	2nd	Coventry City	H	W	3–0	Jaïdi 13', Campbell (2) 65', 78'	25,424	
7 April 2007	3rd	Burnley	H	L	0–1		28,777	
9 April 2007	3rd	Barnsley	A	L	0–1		15,857	
14 April 2007	3rd	Southampton	H	W	2–1	Jaïdi 13', Bendtner 79'	19,754	
17 April 2007	2nd	Leicester City	A	W	2–1	Jaïdi 13', Larsson 19'	24,290	
22 April 2007	1st	Wolverhampton Wanderers	A	W	3–2	Cole 54', Bendtner 77', Jerome 88'	22,754	
28 April 2007	1st	Sheffield Wednesday	H	W	2–0	Jerome 74', Larsson 84'	28,317	
6 May 2007	2nd	Preston North End	A	L	0–1		16,837	

=== League table ===
Pos	Team	Pld	W	D	L	GF	GA	GD	Pts	Promotion, qualification or relegation
1	Sunderland (C, P)	46	27	7	12	76	47	+29	88	Promotion to the Premier League
2	Birmingham City (P)	46	26	8	12	67	42	+25	86	Promotion to the Premier League
3	Derby County (O, P)	46	25	9	12	62	46	+16	84	Qualification for Championship play-offs
4	West Bromwich Albion	46	22	10	14	81	55	+26	76	Qualification for Championship play-offs
5	Wolverhampton Wanderers	46	22	10	14	59	56	+3	76	Qualification for Championship play-offs

Rules for classification: In the Football League goals scored (F) takes precedence over goal difference (GD).
(C) Champions; (O) Play-off winners; (P) Promoted

=== Results summary ===
Overall								Home						Away					
Pld	W	D	L	GF	GA	GD	Pts	W	D	L	GF	GA	GD	W	D	L	GF	GA	GD
46	26	8	12	67	42	+25	86	15	5	3	37	18	+19	11	3	9	30	24	+6

== FA Cup ==
Birmingham reached the fourth round of the 2006–07 FA Cup before losing to Reading of the Premier League.

Round	Date	Opponents	Venue	Result	Score F–A	Scorers	Attendance	Report
Third round	6 January 2007	Newcastle United	H	D	2–2	Campbell 15', Larsson 86'	16,444	
Third round replay	17 January 2007	Newcastle United	A	W	5–1	McSheffrey 5', Solano 45' o.g., Ngotty 59', Larsson 83', Campbell 89'	26,099	
Fourth round	27 January 2007	Reading	H	L	2–3	Martin Taylor 47', Larsson 90'	20,041	

== League Cup ==
Birmingham reached the fourth round of the 2006–07 League Cup before losing to Liverpool of the Premier League.

Round	Date	Opponents	Venue	Result	Score F–A	Scorers	Attendance	Report
First round	22 August 2006	Shrewsbury Town	H	W	1–0	Larsson 83'	12,428	
Second round	19 September 2006	Wrexham	H	W	4–1 a.e.t.	Jerome 41', McSheffrey (2) 102', 113', Bendtner 117'	10,491	
Third round	24 October 2006	Sheffield United	A	W	4–2	Campbell 41, Bendtner 70', Jerome 79', Larsson 90'	10,584	
Fourth round	8 November 2006	Liverpool	H	L	0–1		23,061	

== Transfers ==
=== In ===
Date	Player	Club†	Fee	Ref
31 May 2006	Cameron Jerome	Cardiff City	£3m	
20 June 2006	Neil Danns	Colchester United	£500,000	
28 June 2006	Stephen Kelly	Tottenham Hotspur	£750,000	
6 July 2006	Bruno Ngotty	(Bolton Wanderers)	Free	
4 August 2006	Radhi Jaïdi	Bolton Wanderers	£2m	
16 August 2006	Gary McSheffrey	Coventry City	£4m	
31 August 2006	Artur Krysiak	UKS SMS Łódź	Undisclosed	
11 January 2007	Rowan Vine	Luton Town	£2.5m	
31 January 2007	Patrick Kavanagh	(UCD)	Free	
31 January 2007	Sebastian Larsson	Arsenal	£1m	

† Brackets round club names indicate the player's contract with that club had expired before he joined Birmingham.

==== Loan in ====
Date	Player	Club	Return	Ref
3 August 2006	Fabrice Muamba	Arsenal	End of season	
4 August 2006	Nicklas Bendtner	Arsenal	End of season	
4 August 2006	Sebastian Larsson	Arsenal	31 January 2007	
31 January 2007	Gary Dicker	UCD	End of season	
21 March 2007	Andy Cole	Portsmouth	End of season	

=== Out ===
Date	Player	Fee	Joined†	Ref
7 July 2006	Emile Heskey	£5.5m	Wigan Athletic	
26 July 2006	Jermaine Pennant	£6.7m	Liverpool	
3 August 2006	Alex Bruce	Free	Ipswich Town	
5 January 2007	Peter Till	Free	Grimsby Town	
11 January 2007	Oliver Allen	Released	(Barnet)	
17 January 2007	David Dunn	£5.5m	Blackburn Rovers	
25 January 2007	James Blake	Released	(Redditch United)	
31 January 2007	Marcos Painter	£25,000	Swansea City	
31 January 2007	Matthew Upson	£6m	West Ham United	
30 June 2007	Mathew Birley	Released	(Bromsgrove Rovers)	
30 June 2007	Julian Gray	Released	(Coventry City)	
30 June 2007	Mark Hall	Released		
30 June 2007	Patrick Kavanagh	Released	(Bray Wanderers)	
30 June 2007	Jake Meredith	Released	(Team Bath)	
30 June 2007	Bruno Ngotty	Free	(Leicester City)	
30 June 2007	Jamie Price	Released	(Gloucester City)	
30 June 2007	Nick Wright	Released	(Halesowen Town)	

† Brackets round club names denote the player joined that club after his Birmingham City contract expired.

==== Loan out ====
Date	Player	Club	Return	Ref
6 October 2006	Peter Till	Leyton Orient	One month	
12 October 2006	Nick Wright	Bristol City	One month	
27 October 2006	Adam Legzdins	Oldham Athletic	January 2007	
14 November 2006	Marcos Painter	Swansea City	31 January 2007	
23 November 2006	Mathew Birley	Lincoln City	One month	
23 November 2006	Nick Wright	Northampton Town	One month	
23 November 2006	Peter Till	Grimsby Town	5 January 2007	
4 January 2007	Jamie Price	Tamworth	One month	
12 January 2007	Adam Legzdins	Macclesfield Town	One month	
16 February 2007	Sam Oji	Bristol Rovers	Two months	
30 March 2007	Asa Hall	Ashford Town (Kent)	End of season	
30 March 2007	Nick Wright	Ashford Town (Kent)	End of season	

== Appearances and goals ==
Numbers in parentheses denote appearances made as a substitute.
Players marked † left the club during the playing season.
Players with names in italics and marked * were on loan from another club for the whole of their season with Birmingham.
Players listed with no appearances have been in the matchday squad but only as unused substitutes.
Key to positions: GK – Goalkeeper; DF – Defender; MF – Midfielder; FW – Forward

Players' appearances and goals by competition
No.	Pos.	Nat.	Name	League		FA Cup		League Cup		Total		Discipline	
No.	Pos.	Nat.	Name	Apps	Goals	Apps	Goals	Apps	Goals	Apps	Goals	A yellow rectangle, denoting the yellow penalty card shown to a player being cautioned	A red rectangle, denoting the red penalty card shown to a player being sent off
1	GK	NIR	Maik Taylor	27	0	3	0	1	0	31	0	0	0
2	DF	IRE	Stephen Kelly	35 (1)	0	1	0	3 (1)	0	39 (2)	0	5	0
3	DF	ENG	Mat Sadler	36	0	3	0	2	0	41	0	3	0
4	DF	ENG	Martin Taylor	29 (2)	0	2 (1)	1	4	0	35 (3)	1	1	0
5	DF	ENG	Matthew Upson †	8 (1)	2	3	0	0	0	11 (1)	2	2	0
6	MF	ENG	Stephen Clemence	31 (3)	4	0	0	1	0	32 (3)	4	6	0
7	MF	SWE	Sebastian Larsson	27 (16)	4	3	3	4	2	34 (16)	9	9	0
8	MF	ENG	David Dunn †	9 (2)	1	0	0	0 (1)	0	9 (3)	1	3	0
8	FW	ENG	Andy Cole *	5	1	0	0	0	0	5	1	0	0
9	FW	FIN	Mikael Forssell	3 (5)	1	0	0	2	0	5 (5)	1	0	0
10	FW	ENG	Cameron Jerome (Note: Soccerbase's stats for the match between Derby County and Birmingham City on 9 March 2007 omit substitute appearances by Jerome and Johnson.)	20 (18)	7	2	0	4	2	26 (18)	9	4	1
11	MF	ENG	Julian Gray	2 (5)	0	0	0	3	0	5 (5)	0	2	1
12	MF	TUN	Mehdi Nafti	18 (14)	0	0 (1)	0	1	0	19 (15)	0	7	0
13	GK	IRE	Colin Doyle	19	0	0	0	3	0	22	0	0	0
14	FW	ENG	DJ Campbell	15 (17)	9	3	2	2 (2)	1	20 (19)	12	1	0
15	MF	AUS	Neil Kilkenny	0 (8)	0	0 (3)	0	2 (1)	0	2 (12)	0	0	0
16	DF	CIV	Olivier Tébily	5 (1)	0	0	0	1	0	6 (1)	0	1	0
17	MF	ENG	Neil Danns	11 (18)	3	0 (3)	0	3	0	14 (21)	3	3	0
19	FW	ENG	Rowan Vine	10 (7)	1	0	0	0	0	10 (7)	1	0	0
20	DF	IRE	Marcos Painter †	1	0	0	0	1	0	2	0	1	0
21	DF	FRA	Bruno Ngotty	25	1	2	1	0	0	27	2	2	1
22	MF	NIR	Damien Johnson	24 (2)	1	3	0	0	0	27 (2)	1	2	1
24	DF	TUN	Radhi Jaïdi	38	6	1	0	3	0	42	6	2	2
26	MF	ENG	Fabrice Muamba *	30 (4)	0	3	0	3 (1)	0	36 (5)	0	9	1
27	FW	DEN	Nicklas Bendtner *	38 (4)	11	1 (1)	0	0 (4)	2	39 (9)	13	5	1
28	FW	ENG	Gary McSheffrey	40	13	3	1	1 (1)	2	44 (1)	16	6	1
29	GK	ENG	Adam Legzdins	0	0	0	0	0	0	0	0	0	0

Players not included in matchday squads
No.	Pos.	Nat.	Name
18	DF	ENG	Sam Oji
25	FW	ENG	Sone Aluko
23	MF	ENG	Mathew Birley †
19	MF	ENG	Peter Till †
