= 2017–18 Shrewsbury Town F.C. season =

Shrewsbury Town
2017–18 season
- Chairman: Roland Wycherley
- Manager: Paul Hurst (until 30 May 2018)
- Stadium: New Meadow
- League One: 3rd
- Play-offs: Runners-up
- FA Cup: Third round
- EFL Cup: First round
- EFL Trophy: Final
- Shropshire Senior Cup: Semi-finals
- Top goalscorer: League: Stefan Payne (11); All: Stefan Payne (14)
- Highest home attendance: 9,535 v West Ham United 7 January 2018(all competitions); 8,202 v Blackburn Rovers 23 September 2017 (League)
- Average home league attendance: 6,249
Home colours	Away colours

The 2017–18 season was Shrewsbury Town's 132nd year in existence and their third consecutive season in League One after finishing in 18th place the previous season. Shrewsbury finished third in the League and qualified for the EFL League One play-offs. They reached the play-off final after beating Charlton Athletic in the semi-final, but they were beaten by Rotherham United. Paul Hurst left his role as manager at the end of the season.

The club also participated in the FA Cup, the EFL Cup and the EFL Trophy.

The season covers the period from 1 July 2017 to 30 June 2018.

== Transfers ==
=== Transfers in ===
Date from	Position	Nationality	Name	From	Fee	Contract Length	Ref.
1 July 2017	CF	(France)	Arthur Gnahoua	Kidderminster Harriers	Free	1 year + 1 year option	
1 July 2017	CF	(England)	Lenell John-Lewis	Newport County	Free	1 year + 1 year option	
1 July 2017	CB	(Scotland)	Zak Jules	Reading	Undisclosed	2 years	
1 July 2017	CM	(England)	Jon Nolan	Chesterfield	Undisclosed	3 years	
5 July 2017	GK	(England)	Craig MacGillivray	Walsall	Free	1 year	
20 July 2017	RB	(England)	James Bolton	Gateshead	Undisclosed	2 years	
18 August 2017	CF	(England)	Stefan Payne	Barnsley	Undisclosed	2 years	
22 August 2017	CB	(England)	Omar Beckles	Accrington Stanley	Undisclosed	3 years	
9 January 2018	RB	(England)	Luke Hendrie	Burnley	Undisclosed	1½ years	
31 January 2018	LW	(Sudan)	Abo Eisa	Wealdstone	Undisclosed	1½ years	
31 January 2018	AM	(England)	Sam Jones	Grimsby Town	Undisclosed	2½ years	

=== Transfers out ===
Date from	Position	Nationality	Name	To	Fee	Ref.
1 July 2017	CF	(England)	Kaiman Anderson	Southport	Free	(Note: Kaiman Anderson joined Southport following his release.)
1 July 2017	CM	(Republic of Ireland)	Gary Deegan	Cambridge United	Free	(Note: Gary Deegan joined Cambridge United following his departure.)
1 July 2017	CB	(Egypt)	Adam El-Abd	Wycombe Wanderers	Free	(Note: Adam El-Abd joined Wycombe Wanderers following his release.)
1 July 2017	CB	(England)	Callum Grogan	Radcliffe Borough	Free	(Note: Callum Grogan joined Radcliffe following his release.)
1 July 2017	GK	(England)	Mark Halstead	Southport	Free	(Note: Mark Halstead joined Southport following his release.)
1 July 2017	CF	(England)	Ethan Jones	Southport	Free	(Note: Ethan Jones joined Southport following his release.)
1 July 2017	CB	(England)	Olly Lancashire	Swindon Town	Mutual consent	(Note: Olly Lancashire joined Swindon Town after his departure.)
20 July 2017	AM	(Scotland)	Jim O'Brien	(Scotland) Ross County	Mutual consent	(Note: Jim O'Brien joined Ross County following his departure.)
26 July 2017	GK	(England)	Callum Burton	Hull City	Undisclosed	
2 August 2017	GK	(Canada)	Jayson Leutwiler	Blackburn Rovers	Undisclosed	
31 August 2017	LB	(Northern Ireland)	Ryan McGivern	Northampton Town	Mutual consent	(Note: Ryan McGivern joined Northampton Town following his departure.)
31 January 2018	AM	(England)	Louis Dodds	Chesterfield	Mutual consent	(Note: Louis Dodds joined Chesterfield following his departure.)
9 March 2018	CB	(Wales)	Dominic Smith	AFC Telford United	Mutual consent	(Note: Dominic Smith joined AFC Telford United following his release.)

=== Loans in ===
Start date	Position	Nationality	Name	From	End date	Ref.
1 July 2017	DM	(The Gambia)	Ebou Adams	Norwich City	January 2018	
1 July 2017	LW	(Wales)	Daniel James	Swansea City	31 August 2017 (Note: On 31 August 2017, Daniel James returned to Swansea City after his loan was mutually cancelled.)	
10 July 2017	GK	(England)	Dean Henderson	Manchester United	30 June 2018	
11 July 2017	CF	(England)	Carlton Morris	Norwich City	30 June 2018	
26 July 2017	CF	(England)	Niall Ennis	Wolverhampton Wanderers	28 December 2017 (Note: On 28 December 2017, Niall Ennis was recalled by Wolverhampton Wanderers due to suffering a long-term injury.)	
24 August 2017	CM	(England)	Ben Godfrey	Norwich City	31 May 2018	
5 January 2018	LB	(England)	Max Lowe	Derby County	31 May 2018	
31 January 2018	RW	(England)	Nathan Thomas	Sheffield United	31 May 2018	

=== Loans out ===
Start date	Position	Nationality	Name	To	End date	Ref.
25 July 2017	CB	(Wales)	Dominic Smith	Southport	January 2018	
3 August 2017	GK	(England)	Shaun Rowley	Tamworth	31 December 2017	
15 August 2017	LB	(Wales)	Callum Roberts	(Wales) The New Saints	January 2018	
16 August 2017	RB	(Wales)	Ryan Sears	(Wales) Newtown	End of season	
31 August 2017	CB	(Scotland)	Zak Jules	Chesterfield	January 2018	
31 August 2017	CF	(England)	A-Jay Leitch-Smith	(Scotland) Dundee	End of season	
30 September 2017	CF	(England)	John McAtee	Halesowen Town	30 October 2017	
9 October 2017	CM	(England)	George Hughes	Colwyn Bay	9 November 2017	
8 December 2017	CM	(Northern Ireland)	Christopher Gallagher	Stalybridge Celtic	8 January 2018	
12 January 2018	LB	(Wales)	Callum Roberts	(Wales) Newtown	End of season	
19 January 2018	CB	(Scotland)	Zak Jules	Port Vale	End of season	
19 January 2018	CM	(England)	George Hughes	Clitheroe	17 February 2018	
12 February 2018	CF	(England)	John McAtee	AFC Telford United	End of season	
9 March 2018	CM	(Northern Ireland)	Christopher Gallagher	Stourbridge	7 April 2018	

=== New contracts & contract extensions ===
Date	Position	Nationality	Name	Length	Contracted Until	Ref.
3 October 2017	CB	(Cyprus)	Christos Shelis	2 years	30 June 2019	
29 May 2018	GK	(England)	Cameron Gregory	1 year + 1 year option	30 June 2019	

== Pre-season ==
=== Friendlies ===
In addition to a behind closed doors fixture against Ebbsfleet United played in Portugal, Shrewsbury Town announced six pre-season friendlies, against Aston Villa, Wolverhampton Wanderers, Burton Albion, AFC Telford United, Cardiff City and Brackley Town. In lieu of a reserve team, Salop also announced their intention to organise friendly fixtures throughout the regular season, the first such fixture being against Walsall.

9 July 2017	Ebbsfleet United	0–2	Shrewsbury Town	Santo António, Portugal
16:00 WEST		Report	McAtee; Dodds	Stadium: Vila Real Santo António Stadium

11 July 2017	Brackley Town	2–1	Shrewsbury Town	Brackley
19:00 BST	Ndlovu 27'; Armson 45'	Report	Rodman 78'	Stadium: St James Park; Attendance: 328

15 July 2017	Shrewsbury Town	2–1	Aston Villa	Shrewsbury
15:00 BST	Jules 76'; Gnahoua 80'	Report	Lansbury 90+1' (pen.)	Stadium: Greenhous Meadow; Attendance: 5,549; Referee: Steve Martin

22 July 2017	Shrewsbury Town	2–0	Wolverhampton Wanderers	Shrewsbury
15:00 BST	Rodman 6'; Morris 29'	Report		Stadium: Greenhous Meadow; Attendance: 5,408; Referee: Rob Lewis

25 July 2017	Shrewsbury Town	2–1	Cardiff City	Shrewsbury
19:00 BST	Whalley 49' (pen.); Dodds 50'	Report	Mendez-Laing 44'	Stadium: Greenhous Meadow

26 July 2017	AFC Telford United	1–0	Shrewsbury Town	Telford
19:45 BST	Newby 48'	Report		Stadium: New Bucks Head

29 July 2017	Shrewsbury Town	1–0	Burton Albion	Shrewsbury
15:00 BST	Whalley 85' (pen.)	Report		Stadium: Greenhous Meadow

22 August 2017	Shrewsbury Town	2–1	Walsall	Shrewsbury
13:00 BST	Payne 12'; Gnahoua (?)	Report	Candlin (?)	Stadium: Greenhous Meadow; Attendance: 0

== Competitions ==
=== League One ===
==== League table ====
Pos	Team	Pld	W	D	L	GF	GA	GD	Pts	Promotion, qualification or relegation
1	Wigan Athletic (C, P)	46	29	11	6	89	29	+60	98	Promotion to the EFL Championship
2	Blackburn Rovers (P)	46	28	12	6	82	40	+42	96	Promotion to the EFL Championship
3	Shrewsbury Town	46	25	12	9	60	39	+21	87	Qualification for League One play-offs (Note: Four teams play for one spot and promotion to the EFL Championship.)
4	Rotherham United (O, P)	46	24	7	15	73	53	+20	79	Qualification for League One play-offs
5	Scunthorpe United	46	19	17	10	65	50	+15	74	Qualification for League One play-offs

Source: BBC Sport
Rules for classification: 1) Points; 2) Goal difference; 3) Number of goals scored
(C) Champions; (O) Play-off winners; (P) Promoted

==== Results summary ====
Overall								Home						Away					
Pld	W	D	L	GF	GA	GD	Pts	W	D	L	GF	GA	GD	W	D	L	GF	GA	GD
38	23	9	6	51	28	+23	78	12	3	3	25	10	+15	11	6	3	26	18	+8

Last updated: 25 March 2018.

==== Results by matchday ====
Matchday	1	2	3	4	5	6	7	8	9	10	11	12	13	14	15	16	17	18	19	20	21	22	23	24	25	26	27	28	29	30	31	32	33	34	35	36	37	38	39	40	41	42	43	44	45	46
Ground	H	A	H	A	A	H	H	A	H	A	H	A	A	H	H	A	A	A	H	A	H	H	A	A	H	A	H	A	A	H	A	H	H	A	H	A	A	H	A	H	A	H	H	H	A	H
Result	W	W	W	D	W	W	W	W	D	W	W	D	D	W	W	L	W	L	L	D	W	W	D	W	W	L	D	W	W	L	W	L	D	W	W	W	D	W	L	W	D	L	D	W	D	L
Position	9	6	4	3	2	1	1	1	1	1	1	1	2	1	1	1	1	1	2	2	2	2	2	2	2	2	3	2	2	2	1	1	2	2	2	2	2	1	3	3	3	3	3	3	3	3

Updated to match(es) played on 30 March 2018. Source: Statto.com
A = Away; H = Home; W = Win; D = Draw; L = Loss

==== Matches ====
5 August 2017 1	Shrewsbury Town	1–0	Northampton Town	Shrewsbury
15:00 BST	Ogogo (yellow card) 67'; Nolan (yellow card) 86'; John-Lewis 90+2'	Report	Crooks (yellow card) 56'	Stadium: New Meadow; Attendance: 5,736; Referee: Seb Stockbridge

12 August 2017 2	AFC Wimbledon	0–1	Shrewsbury Town	Kingsmeadow
15:00 BST	Oshilaja (yellow card) 48'; Francomb (yellow card) 90+3'	Report	Rodman 8'; Brown (yellow card) 55'; Bolton (yellow card) 61'	Attendance: 3,981; Referee: Charles Breakspear

19 August 2017 3	Shrewsbury Town	3–2	Rochdale	Shrewsbury
15:00 BST	Whalley 30' (pen.); C. Morris 33'; Payne 74'	Report	Davies 17' (pen.) 63' (pen.); McGahey (yellow card) 67'; Rafferty (yellow card) 68'	Stadium: New Meadow; Attendance: 5,001; Referee: Andy Haines

26 August 2017 4	Oxford United	1–1	Shrewsbury Town	Oxford
15:00 BST	van Kessel 75'	Report	Payne 83'	Stadium: Kassam Stadium; Attendance: 7,120; Referee: Nick Kinseley

2 September 2017 5	Gillingham	1–2	Shrewsbury Town	Gillingham, Kent
15:00 BST	Eaves (yellow card) 74'; Parker 76'	Report	Morris 30'; Rodman 37'; Brown (yellow card) 68'	Stadium: Priestfield Stadium; Referee: Kevin Johnson

9 September 2017 6	Shrewsbury Town	1–0	Wigan Athletic	Shrewsbury
15:00 BST	Payne 26'; Rodman (yellow card) 45'; Whalley (yellow card) 84'; Henderson (yellow card) 90'	Report	Toney (yellow card) 45'; James (yellow card) 75'; Evans (yellow card) 90'	Stadium: New Meadow; Attendance: 6,929; Referee: Mark Heywood

12 September 2017 7	Shrewsbury Town	1–0	Southend United	Shrewsbury
19:45 BST	Rodman (yellow card) 14'; Nolan 23'; Brown (yellow card) 58'; Whalley (yellow card) 90+2'	Report	Ferdinand (yellow card) 63'; McLaughlin (yellow card) 77'	Stadium: New Meadow; Attendance: 5,129; Referee: Ross Joyce

16 September 2017 8	Oldham Athletic	1–2	Shrewsbury Town	Boundary Park
15:00 BST	Davies 33'; Doyle (yellow card) 38' (yellow-red card) 90+3'; Gardner (yellow card) 74'; Gerrard (yellow card) 90+5'	Report	Payne 19'; Nolan 65' (yellow card) 90'; C. Morris (yellow card) 73'; Rodman (yellow card) 80'	Attendance: 4,150; Referee: Ben Toner

23 September 2017 9	Shrewsbury Town	1–1	Blackburn Rovers	Shrewsbury
15:00 BST	Nsiala 57'	Report	Dack (yellow card) 56' (goal) 85'	Stadium: New Meadow; Attendance: 8,202; Referee: David Webb

26 September 2017 10	Doncaster Rovers	1–2	Shrewsbury Town	Keepmoat Stadium
19:45 BST	Rowe 35'; Wright (yellow card) 59'	Report	Riley 36'; Ogogo (yellow card) 43'; Brown (yellow card) 68'; Gnahoua 90+4'	Attendance: 7,194; Referee: John Brookes

30 September 2017 11	Shrewsbury Town	2–0	Scunthorpe United	Shrewsbury
15:00 BST	Payne 24'; Nolan (yellow card) 35'; C. Morris 87'	Report	Bishop (yellow card) 36'; Madden (yellow card) 90'	Stadium: New Meadow; Attendance: 5,759; Referee: Graham Horwood

7 October 2017 12	Walsall	1−1	Shrewsbury Town	Walsall
15:00 BST	Agyei 13'; Bakayoko (yellow card) 77'	Report	Payne 20' (pen.); Ogogo (yellow card) 72'	Stadium: Bescot Stadium; Attendance: 5,971; Referee: Graham Salisbury

14 October 2017 13	Plymouth Argyle	1−1	Shrewsbury Town	Plymouth
15:00 BST	Carey 58'	Report	Nsiala (yellow card) 41'; Whalley 78'	Stadium: Home Park; Attendance: 8,280; Referee: Mark Heywood

17 October 2017 14	Shrewsbury Town	4–0	Bristol Rovers	Shrewsbury
19:45 BST	Rodman 12'; C. Morris 24'; Nolan 29'; Brown 41'	Report	Lines (yellow card) 44'	Stadium: New Meadow; Attendance: 5,652; Referee: Darren Handley

21 October 2017 15	Shrewsbury Town	1–0	Fleetwood Town	Shrewsbury
15:00 BST	Nsiala 89'	Report	Cargill (yellow card) 40'; Coyle (yellow card) 69'	Stadium: New Meadow; Attendance: 5,989; Referee: Nick Kinseley

28 October 2017 16	Peterborough United	1–0	Shrewsbury Town	Peterborough
15:00 BST	Maddison 14' (yellow card) 21'; Edwards (yellow card) 43'; Grant (yellow card) 65'; Tafazolli (yellow card) 74'	Report	Whalley (yellow card) 48'; Nolan (yellow card) 50'; Ogogo (yellow card) 58'; Godfrey (yellow card) 64'	Stadium: London Road Stadium; Attendance: 5,606; Referee: David Webb

18 November 2017 17	Rotherham United	1–2	Shrewsbury Town	Rotherham
15:00 GMT	Wood (yellow card) 58'; Towell 76'	Report	Nolan 16'; Ogogo (red card) 53'; Nsiala (yellow card) 58'; Payne 90+3'	Stadium: New York Stadium; Attendance: 8,184; Referee: Robert Jones

21 November 2017 18	Bury	1–0	Shrewsbury Town	Bury
19:45 GMT	Leigh 56'	Report		Stadium: Gigg Lane; Attendance: 3,055; Referee: Seb Stockbridge

25 November 2017 19	Shrewsbury Town	0–1	Bradford City	Shrewsbury
15:00 GMT		Report	Hendrie (yellow card) 24'; Nsiala 55' (o.g.); Sattelmaier (yellow card) 90+3'	Stadium: New Meadow; Attendance: 7,165; Referee: Michael Salisbury

9 December 2017 20	Milton Keynes Dons	1–1	Shrewsbury Town	Denbigh
15:00 GMT	Pawlett 56'; Aneke (yellow card) 60'; Upson (yellow card) 90+3'	Report	Bolton (yellow card) 77'; Whalley 86'	Stadium: Stadium mk Attendance: 8,355; Referee: Ross Joyce

16 December 2017 21	Shrewsbury Town	1–0	Blackpool	Shrewsbury
15:00 GMT	Nolan 54'; C. Morris (yellow card) 81'	Report	Tilt (yellow card) 45'; Spearing (yellow card) 82'	Stadium: New Meadow; Attendance: 5,620; Referee: Andy Woolmer

23 December 2017 22	Shrewsbury Town	2–0	Portsmouth	Shrewsbury
15:00 GMT	B. Morris (yellow card) 57'; Whalley 59'; Payne 81'; Nolan (yellow card) 89'	Report	Clarke (yellow card) 17'; Lowe (yellow card) 29'; Haunstrup (yellow card) 43'	Stadium: New Meadow; Attendance: 7,429; Referee: Darren Handley

26 December 2017 23	Wigan Athletic	0–0	Shrewsbury Town	Wigan
15:00 GMT	Evans (yellow card) 81'	Report	Beckles (yellow card) 58'; Whalley (yellow card) 65'	Stadium: DW Stadium; Attendance: 11,115; Referee: David Webb

30 December 2017 24	Southend United	1–2	Shrewsbury Town	Southend-on-Sea
15:00 GMT	Wright (yellow card) 34'; Leonard 55'; Turner (yellow card) 64'	Report	Coker 18' (o.g.); Godfrey 40'; Whalley (yellow card) 62'; Rodman (yellow card) 90'	Stadium: Roots Hall; Attendance: 7,076; Referee: Gavin Ward

1 January 2018 25	Shrewsbury Town	1–0	Oldham Athletic	Shrewsbury
15:00 GMT	Whalley 16'; Nolan (yellow card) 57'	Report	Gardner (yellow card) 73'; Byrne (yellow card) 84'	Stadium: New Meadow; Attendance: 6,383; Referee: Tom Nield

13 January 2018 26	Blackburn Rovers	3–1	Shrewsbury Town	Blackburn
15:00 GMT	Mulgrew 6', 70'; Raya (yellow card) 35'; Graham 60'	Report	Beckles (yellow card) 13'; Nolan 35' (pen.)	Stadium: Ewood Park; Attendance: 13,579; Referee: John Brooks

20 January 2018 27	Shrewsbury Town	2–2	Doncaster Rovers	Shrewsbury
15:00 GMT	Sadler 21'; Nsiala (yellow card) 31'; Morris 52'; Hendrie (yellow card) 74'	Report	Butler (yellow card) 8'; Baudry 62'; Mason (yellow card) 64'; Ben Khémis 76'; Whiteman (yellow card) 81'; Blair (yellow card) 81'	Stadium: New Meadow; Attendance: 5,818; Referee: Anthony Backhouse

27 January 2018 28	Portsmouth	0–1	Shrewsbury Town	Portsmouth
15:00 GMT	May (yellow card) 16' (yellow-red card); Evans (yellow card) 37'	Report	Bolton 21'; C. Morris (yellow card) 38'; Rodman (yellow card) 60'; Payne (yellow card) 90'	Stadium: Fratton Park; Attendance: 17,779; Referee: David Coote

3 February 2018 29	Bristol Rovers	1–2	Shrewsbury Town	Horfield
15:00 GMT	Lines (yellow card) 62'; Partington 65'	Report	Beckles 62'; Rodman 88'; Payne (yellow card) 89'	Stadium: Memorial Stadium; Attendance: 9,380; Referee: Trevor Kettle

10 February 2018 30	Shrewsbury Town	1–2	Plymouth Argyle	Shrewsbury
15:00 GMT	Morris 6'; Payne (yellow card) 83'	Report	Ness 27'; Vyner 62'	Stadium: New Meadow; Attendance: 7,036 (995 away); Referee: Ben Toner

13 February 2018 31	Fleetwood Town	1–2	Shrewsbury Town	Fleetwood
19:45 GMT	Madden 59'	Report	Whalley 45'; Thomas 82'	Stadium: Highbury Stadium; Attendance: 2,531; Referee: Ross Joyce

17 February 2018 32	Shrewsbury Town	0–1	Rotherham United	Shrewsbury
15:00 GMT	Beckles (yellow card) 71'	Report	Wood 44'; Newell (yellow card) 80'; Towell (yellow card) 90+3'	Stadium: New Meadow; Attendance: 7,007; Referee: Carl Boyeson

20 February 2018 33	Shrewsbury Town	1–1	Gillingham	Shrewsbury
19:45 GMT	Ogogo 14'; Thomas (yellow card) 49'	Report	Nugent (yellow card) 36'; Byrne 82'	Stadium: New Meadow; Attendance: 4,839; Referee: Craig Hicks

24 February 2018 34	Charlton Athletic	0–2	Shrewsbury Town	Charlton
15:00 GMT	Forster-Caskey (yellow card) 20'; Solly (yellow card) 79'; Kashi (yellow card) 84'; Magennis (yellow card) 86'	Report	Rodman 52'; Beckles 67'; Nsiala (yellow card) 90+1'	Stadium: The Valley; Attendance: 17,581; Referee: Chris Sarginson

10 March 2018 35	Shrewsbury Town	2–0	Walsall	Shrewsbury
15:00 GMT	Rodman 6'; Hendrie (yellow card) 28'; Ogogo 88'	Report	Chambers (yellow card) 51'	Stadium: New Meadow; Attendance: 7,633; Referee: Steve Martin

17 March 2018 36	Scunthorpe United	1–2	Shrewsbury Town	Scunthorpe
15:00 GMT	Morris 8'; McArdle (yellow card) 62'; Toney (yellow card) 75'	Report	Nsiala (yellow card) 8'; C. Morris (yellow card) 43'; Nolan 51' (yellow card) 84'; Payne 59' (pen.)	Stadium: Glanford Park; Attendance: 3,824; Referee: Michael Salisbury

20 March 2018 37	Northampton Town	1–1	Shrewsbury Town	Northampton
19:45 GMT	Facey 45'; O'Toole (red card) 64'; Bunney (yellow card) 66'; Moloney (yellow card) 88'	Report	Beckles (yellow card) 32'; Ogogo (red card) 65'; Nolan 67' (yellow card) 84'	Stadium: Sixfields Stadium; Attendance: 4,788; Referee: Andy Davies

24 March 2018 38	Shrewsbury Town	1–0	AFC Wimbledon	Shrewsbury
15:00 GMT	Payne 54'; B. Morris (yellow card) 56' (yellow-red card) 86'; Beckles (yellow card) 61'; Nsiala (yellow card) 90'	Report	Parrett (yellow card) 74'; Taylor (yellow card) 88'	Stadium: New Meadow; Attendance: 6,456; Referee: Darren Drysdale

30 March 2018 39	Rochdale	3–1	Shrewsbury Town	Rochdale
15:00 GMT	Rathbone 45+12'; Davies 80'; Henderson 90+6'	Report	Thomas 8'; Morris (yellow card) 89'	Stadium: Spotland Stadium; Attendance: 4,098; Referee: Richard Clark

2 April 2018 40	Shrewsbury Town	3–2	Oxford United	Shrewsbury
15:00 BST	Thomas (yellow card) 32'; Whalley 40' 64'; Lowe (yellow card) 45+1'; Nolan 47'; Godfrey (yellow card) 88'	Report	Thomas 62' (yellow card) 90+1'; Rothwell 73'; Brannagan (yellow card) 85'	Stadium: New Meadow; Attendance: 7,191 (674 away); Referee: Seb Stockbridge

12 April 2018 41	Bradford City	0–0	Shrewsbury Town	Bradford
	Dieng (yellow card) 31'	Report	Beckles (yellow card) 13' (yellow-red card) 60'; Nsiala (yellow card) 41'; Whalley (yellow card) 90+3'	Stadium: Valley Parade; Attendance: 18,997; Referee: David Webb

17 April 2018 42	Shrewsbury Town	0–2	Charlton Athletic	Shrewsbury
19:45 GMT		Report	Pearce 74'; Magennis 90+8'	Stadium: New Meadow; Attendance: 5,839; Referee: Darren Handley

21 April 2018 43	Shrewsbury Town	1–1	Bury	Shrewsbury
	Eisa 13'; Gnahoua (yellow card) 90'	Report	Ismail (yellow card) 44'; O'Shea 66'; Edwards (yellow card) 71'	Stadium: New Meadow; Attendance: 5,735; Referee: Eddie Ilderton

24 April 2018 44	Shrewsbury Town	3–1	Peterborough United	Shrewsbury
19:45 BST	Beckles 59'; Payne 73'; John-Lewis 90+2'	Report	Edwards 32'	Stadium: New Meadow; Attendance: 4,666; Referee: Mark Heywood

28 April 2018 45	Blackpool	1–1	Shrewsbury Town	Blackpool
	Delfouneso 56'	Report	Jones 20'	Stadium: Bloomfield Road; Attendance: 5,825; Referee: Martin Coy

5 May 2018 46	Shrewsbury Town	0–1	Milton Keynes Dons	Shrewsbury
15:30 BST	Bolton (yellow card) 90'	Report	Agard 63' (pen.), (yellow card) 64'; Golbourne (yellow card) 90'	Stadium: New Meadow; Attendance: 6,516; Referee: Andy Haines

=== League One play-offs ===
10 May 2018 Semi-Final First Leg	Charlton Athletic	0–1	Shrewsbury Town	Charlton
19:45 BST		Report	C.Morris (yellow card) 36'; Rodman (yellow card) 74'; Nolan 80'	Stadium: The Valley; Attendance: 14,367; Referee: Simon Hooper

13 May 2018 Semi-Final Second Leg	Shrewsbury Town	1–0 (2–0 agg.)	Charlton Athletic	Shrewsbury
17:15 BST	C. Morris 58'; B. Morris (yellow card) 75'; Nolan (yellow card) 84'	Report	Bauer (yellow card) 50'	Stadium: New Meadow; Attendance: 9026; Referee: Jeremy Simpson

27 May 2018 Final	Rotherham United	2–1 (a.e.t.)	Shrewsbury Town	London
15:00 BST	Wood 32', 103'	Report	Whalley (yellow card) 27'; Bolton (yellow card) 38'; Rodman 58'; Sadler (yellow card) 103'	Stadium: Wembley Stadium; Attendance: 26,218; Referee: Robert Jones

=== FA Cup ===
4 November 2017 First round	Shrewsbury Town	5–0	Aldershot Town	Shrewsbury
15:00 GMT	Rodman 20'; Whalley 24' (pen.); Riley (yellow card) 45+1'; Payne 62'; Gnahoua 66'; Morris 68'	Report		Stadium: New Meadow; Attendance: 3,859; Referee: Ross Joyce

2 December 2017 Second round	Shrewsbury Town	2–0	Morecambe	Shrewsbury
15:00 GMT	Rodman 32'; Whalley 37' (pen.); Payne (yellow card) 39'	Report	Roche (yellow card) 36'; Wildig (yellow card) 69'	Stadium: New Meadow; Attendance: 3,184; Referee: Craig Hicks

7 January 2018 Third round	Shrewsbury Town	0–0	West Ham United	Shrewsbury
14:00 GMT		Report		Stadium: New Meadow; Attendance: 9,535; Referee: Paul Tierney

16 January 2018 Third round replay	West Ham United	1–0 (a.e.t.)	Shrewsbury Town	Stratford, London
19:45 GMT	Burke 112'	Report	Nolan (yellow card) 66'; Ogogo (yellow card) 71'	Stadium: London Stadium; Attendance: 39,867; Referee: Jeremy Simpson

=== EFL Cup ===
On 16 June 2017, Shrewsbury Town were drawn away to Nottingham Forest in the first round.

8 August 2017 First round	Nottingham Forest	2–1	Shrewsbury Town	West Bridgford
19:45 BST	Fox (yellow card) 17'; Carayol 29' (pen.); Cummings (yellow card) 65' (goal) 75'	Report	Ogogo (yellow card) 28'; Whalley 79' (pen.)	Stadium: City Ground; Attendance: 7,546; Referee: John Busby

=== EFL Trophy ===
On 12 July 2017, the group stage draw was complete with Shrewsbury facing Coventry City, Walsall and West Bromwich Albion U23s. After finishing as runners-up, Shrewsbury were drawn away in the second round against Port Vale. A home tie against Blackpool was confirmed for the third round.

Pos	Lge	Team	Pld	W	PW	PL	L	GF	GA	GD	Pts	Qualification
1	L1	Walsall (Q)	3	2	0	1	0	6	3	+3	7	Round 2
2	L1	Shrewsbury Town (Q)	3	2	0	0	1	6	3	+3	6	Round 2
3	L2	Coventry City (E)	3	1	1	0	1	6	6	0	5	
4	ACA	West Bromwich Albion U21 (E)	3	0	0	0	3	2	8	−6	0	

Updated to match(es) played on 3 October 2017. Source: EFL.com
(E) Eliminated; (Q) Qualified to the phase indicated

29 August 2017	Coventry City	2–3	Shrewsbury Town	Coventry
19:45 BST	Andreu 51' (yellow card) 66'; McNulty 63' (pen.)	Report	Payne 30'; Gnahoua; Bolton (red card) 69'; Godfrey (yellow card) 71'; Adams (yellow card) 79'; Riley 90+4'	Stadium: Ricoh Arena; Attendance: 1,968; Referee: Tom Nield

3 October 2017	Shrewsbury Town	3–0	West Bromwich Albion U23s	Shrewsbury
19:45 BST	John-Lewis 24'; Morris 49'; Beckles (yellow card) 53'; Dodds 75'	Report		Stadium: New Meadow; Attendance: 1,404; Referee: Michael Salisbury

7 November 2017	Shrewsbury Town	0–1	Walsall	Shrewsbury
19:45 GMT	Sadler (yellow card) 27'; Godfrey (red card) 75'; Ogogo (yellow card) 89'	Report	Bakayoko 90'	Stadium: New Meadow; Attendance: 1,701; Referee: Trevor Kettle

5 December 2017 Second round	Port Vale	1–2	Shrewsbury Town	Burslem
19:45 GMT	Montaño 1'; Gunning (yellow card) 14'	Report	C. Morris (yellow card) 15'; Sadler (yellow card) 41'; B. Morris (yellow card) 67'; Dodds 68'; Whalley 81'; Beckles (yellow card) 90+1'	Stadium: Vale Park; Attendance: 965; Referee: Graham Salisbury

10 January 2018 Third round	Shrewsbury Town	0–0 (4–2 p)	Blackpool	Shrewsbury
19:00 GMT		Report		Stadium: New Meadow; Attendance: 1,362; Referee: Chris Sarginson
	Penalties
	Payne (penalty scored); Morris (penalty scored); Riley (penalty scored); John-Lewis (penalty scored)		Philliskirk (penalty missed); Cooke (penalty scored); Roache (penalty missed); Delfouneso (penalty scored)

23 January 2018 Quarter-final	Shrewsbury Town	2–1	Oldham Athletic	Shrewsbury
19:00 GMT	Payne 1'; Rodman 88'	Report	Amadi-Holloway 67'; Gardner (yellow card)	Stadium: New Meadow; Attendance: 1,984; Referee: Darren Handley

6 March 2018 Semi-final	Shrewsbury Town	1–0	Yeovil Town	Shrewsbury
19:45 GMT	Morris 63'; Whalley (yellow card) 87'	Report	Khan (yellow card) 57'	Stadium: New Meadow; Attendance: 4,118; Referee: Darren Drysdale

8 April 2018 Final	Lincoln City	1–0	Shrewsbury Town	Wembley
15:00 BST	Whitehouse 16'	Report		Stadium: Wembley Stadium; Attendance: 41,261; Referee: Gavin Ward

== Player statistics ==
=== Squad statistics ===
As of match played 27 May 2018.

No.	Pos	Nat	Player	Total		League One		League One play-offs		FA Cup		League Cup		League Trophy	
No.	Pos	Nat	Player	Apps	Goals	Apps	Goals	Apps	Goals	Apps	Goals	Apps	Goals	Apps	Goals
1	GK	(England) ENG	Dean Henderson	48	0	38	0	3	0	2	0	1	0	4	0
2	DF	(England) ENG	Joe Riley	20	2	8+2	1	0+3	0	2	0	0	0	4+1	1
3	DF	(England) ENG	Max Lowe	16	0	8+4	0	0	0	1+1	0	0	0	2	0
4	MF	(England) ENG	Ben Godfrey	51	1	35+5	1	3	0	4	0	0	0	4	0
5	DF	(England) ENG	Mat Sadler	56	1	42	1	3	0	4	0	1	0	6	0
6	DF	(England) ENG	Omar Beckles	47	3	29+4	3	3	0	4	0	0	0	7	0
7	MF	(England) ENG	Shaun Whalley	58	12	40+4	8	3	0	4	2	0+1	1	5+1	1
8	MF	(England) ENG	Abu Ogogo	42	2	35	2	0	0	2	0	1	0	4	0
9	FW	(England) ENG	Carlton Morris	54	10	31+11	6	3	1	1+3	1	0	0	4+1	2
10	MF	(England) ENG	Nathan Thomas	13	2	7+4	2	0	0	0	0	0	0	1+1	0
11	FW	(France) FRA	Arthur Gnahoua	22	3	4+7	1	0	0	0+3	1	1	0	5+2	1
12	DF	(England) ENG	Junior Brown	17	1	15	1	0	0	0	0	1	0	1	0
13	DF	(England) ENG	James Bolton	44	1	32+1	1	3	0	2+1	0	1	0	4	0
14	FW	(England) ENG	Lenell John-Lewis	47	3	0+34	2	0+3	0	0+1	0	0+1	0	4+4	1
15	GK	(England) ENG	Craig MacGillivray	14	0	8	0	0	0	2	0	0	0	4	0
16	MF	(England) ENG	Bryn Morris	30	0	14+4	0	3	0	2	0	0	0	7	0
17	DF	(England) ENG	Luke Hendrie	10	0	9+1	0	0	0	0	0	0	0	0	0
18	DF	(Scotland) SCO	Zak Jules	0	0	0	0	0	0	0	0	0	0	0	0
19	MF	(England) ENG	Sam Jones	5	1	3+2	1	0	0	0	0	0	0	0	0
20	MF	(England) ENG	Jon Nolan	55	10	43	9	3	1	4	0	1	0	4	0
21	MF	(Sudan) SDN	Abo Eisa	5	1	3+2	1	0	0	0	0	0	0	0	0
22	DF	(Democratic Republic of the Congo) COD	Aristote Nsiala	58	2	44	2	3	0	4	0	1	0	6	0
23	MF	(England) ENG	Alex Rodman	55	10	36+5	6	3	1	3+1	2	1	0	3+3	1
24	MF	(England) ENG	George Hughes	1	0	0	0	0	0	0	0	0	0	0+1	0
25	MF	(Northern Ireland) NIR	Chris Gallagher	0	0	0	0	0	0	0	0	0	0	0	0
26	FW	(England) ENG	John McAtee	0	0	0	0	0	0	0	0	0	0	0	0
27	DF	(Wales) WAL	Ryan Sears	0	0	0	0	0	0	0	0	0	0	0	0
28	DF	(Wales) WAL	Callum Roberts	0	0	0	0	0	0	0	0	0	0	0	0
30	GK	(England) ENG	Shaun Rowley	0	0	0	0	0	0	0	0	0	0	0	0
31	GK	(England) ENG	Cameron Gregory	0	0	0	0	0	0	0	0	0	0	0	0
37	FW	(England) ENG	Lifumpa Mwandwe	1	0	0	0	0	0	0	0	0	0	0+1	0
38	MF	(England) ENG	Ryan Barnett	1	0	0	0	0	0	0	0	0	0	0+1	0
39	DF	(Cyprus) CYP	Christos Shelis	2	0	0	0	0	0	0	0	0	0	1+1	0
44	GK	(Wales) WAL	Danny Coyne	0	0	0	0	0	0	0	0	0	0	0	0
45	FW	(England) ENG	Stefan Payne	51	14	18+20	11	0+3	0	3+1	1	0	0	4+2	2
—	FW	(England) ENG	A-Jay Leitch-Smith	0	0	0	0	0	0	0	0	0	0	0	0
Players who left the club before the season ended:
10	MF	(England) ENG	Louis Dodds	17	2	5+4	0	0	0	0+3	0	0+1	0	3+1	2
17	MF	(The Gambia) GAM	Ebou Adams	8	0	0+5	0	0	0	0	0	1	0	1+1	0
19	FW	(England) ENG	Niall Ennis	2	0	0+1	0	0	0	0	0	1	0	0	0
21	MF	(Wales) WAL	Daniel James	0	0	0	0	0	0	0	0	0	0	0	0
—	DF	(Northern Ireland) NIR	Ryan McGivern	0	0	0	0	0	0	0	0	0	0	0	0
—	DF	(Wales) WAL	Dominic Smith	0	0	0	0	0	0	0	0	0	0	0	0

=== Top scorers ===
As of match played 27 May 2018.

Place	Position	Nation	Number	Name	League One	League One play-offs	FA Cup	League Cup	FL Trophy	Total
1	FW	(England)	45	Stefan Payne	11	0	1	0	2	14
2	MF	(England)	7	Shaun Whalley	8	0	2	1	1	12
3	FW	(England)	9	Carlton Morris	6	1	1	0	2	10
3	MF	(England)	20	Jon Nolan	9	1	0	0	0	10
4	MF	(England)	23	Alex Rodman	5	1	2	0	1	9
5	DF	(England)	6	Omar Beckles	3	0	0	0	0	3
5	FW	(England)	14	Lenell John-Lewis	2	0	0	0	1	3
5	FW	(France)	11	Arthur Gnahoua	1	0	1	0	1	3
6	MF	(England)	10	Nathan Thomas	2	0	0	0	0	2
6	MF	(England)	8	Abu Ogogo	2	0	0	0	0	2
6	MF	(England)	10	~~Louis Dodds~~	0	0	0	0	2	2
6	DF	(Democratic Republic of the Congo)	22	Aristote Nsiala	2	0	0	0	0	2
6	DF	(England)	2	Joe Riley	1	0	0	0	1	2
6	MF	(England)	19	Sam Jones	1	0	0	0	0	1
6	MF	(Sudan)	21	Abo Eisa	1	0	0	0	0	1
6	DF	(England)	13	James Bolton	1	0	0	0	0	1
6	DF	(England)	5	Mat Sadler	1	0	0	0	0	1
6	MF	(England)	4	Ben Godfrey	1	0	0	0	0	1
6	DF	(England)	12	Junior Brown	1	0	0	0	0	1
6	Own-goals				1	0	0	0	0	1

=== Clean sheets ===
As of match played 27 May 2018.

Rank	Pos	No.	Nat	Name	League One	League One play-offs	FA Cup	League Cup	EFL Trophy	Total
1	GK	1	(England)	Dean Henderson	14	2	1	0	2	19
2	GK	15	(England)	Craig MacGillivray	2	0	2	0	1	5
Total					16	2	3	0	3	24

=== Disciplinary record ===
As of match played 27 May 2018.

Number	Nation	Position	Name	League One		League One play-offs		FA Cup		League Cup		FL Trophy		Total	
Number	Nation	Position	Name	Booked	Sent off (straight red)	Booked	Sent off (straight red)	Booked	Sent off (straight red)	Booked	Sent off (straight red)	Booked	Sent off (straight red)	Booked	Sent off (straight red)
1	(England)	GK	Dean Henderson	1	0	0	0	0	0	0	0	0	0	1	0
2	(England)	DF	Joe Riley	0	0	0	0	1	0	0	0	1	0	1	0
3	(England)	DF	Max Lowe	1	0	0	0	0	0	0	0	0	0	1	0
4	(England)	MF	Ben Godfrey	3	0	0	0	0	0	0	0	1	1	4	1
5	(England)	DF	Mat Sadler	0	0	1	0	0	0	0	0	2	0	3	0
6	(England)	DF	Omar Beckles	5	1	0	0	0	0	0	0	2	0	7	1
7	(England)	MF	Shaun Whalley	6	0	1	0	0	0	0	0	1	0	8	0
8	(England)	MF	Abu Ogogo	4	2	0	0	1	0	1	0	2	0	8	2
9	(England)	FW	Carlton Morris	5	0	1	0	0	0	0	0	1	0	7	0
10	(England)	MF	Nathan Thomas	2	0	0	0	0	0	0	0	0	0	2	0
12	(England)	DF	Junior Brown	4	0	0	0	0	0	0	0	0	0	4	0
13	(England)	DF	James Bolton	3	0	1	0	0	0	0	0	0	1	4	1
16	(England)	MF	Bryn Morris	1	1	1	0	0	0	0	0	1	0	3	1
17	(England)	DF	Luke Hendrie	2	0	0	0	0	0	0	0	0	0	2	0
17	(The Gambia)	MF	~~Ebou Adams~~	0	0	0	0	0	0	0	0	1	0	1	0
20	(England)	MF	Jon Nolan	8	0	1	0	1	0	0	0	1	0	11	0
22	(Democratic Republic of the Congo)	DF	Aristote Nsiala	8	0	0	0	0	0	0	0	1	0	9	0
23	(England)	MF	Alex Rodman	5	0	1	0	0	0	0	0	0	0	6	0
45	(England)	FW	Stefan Payne	3	0	0	0	1	0	0	0	0	0	4	0

Note: Two yellow cards in one match is counted as one red card.
