= Abu Ogogo =

English footballer (born 1989)

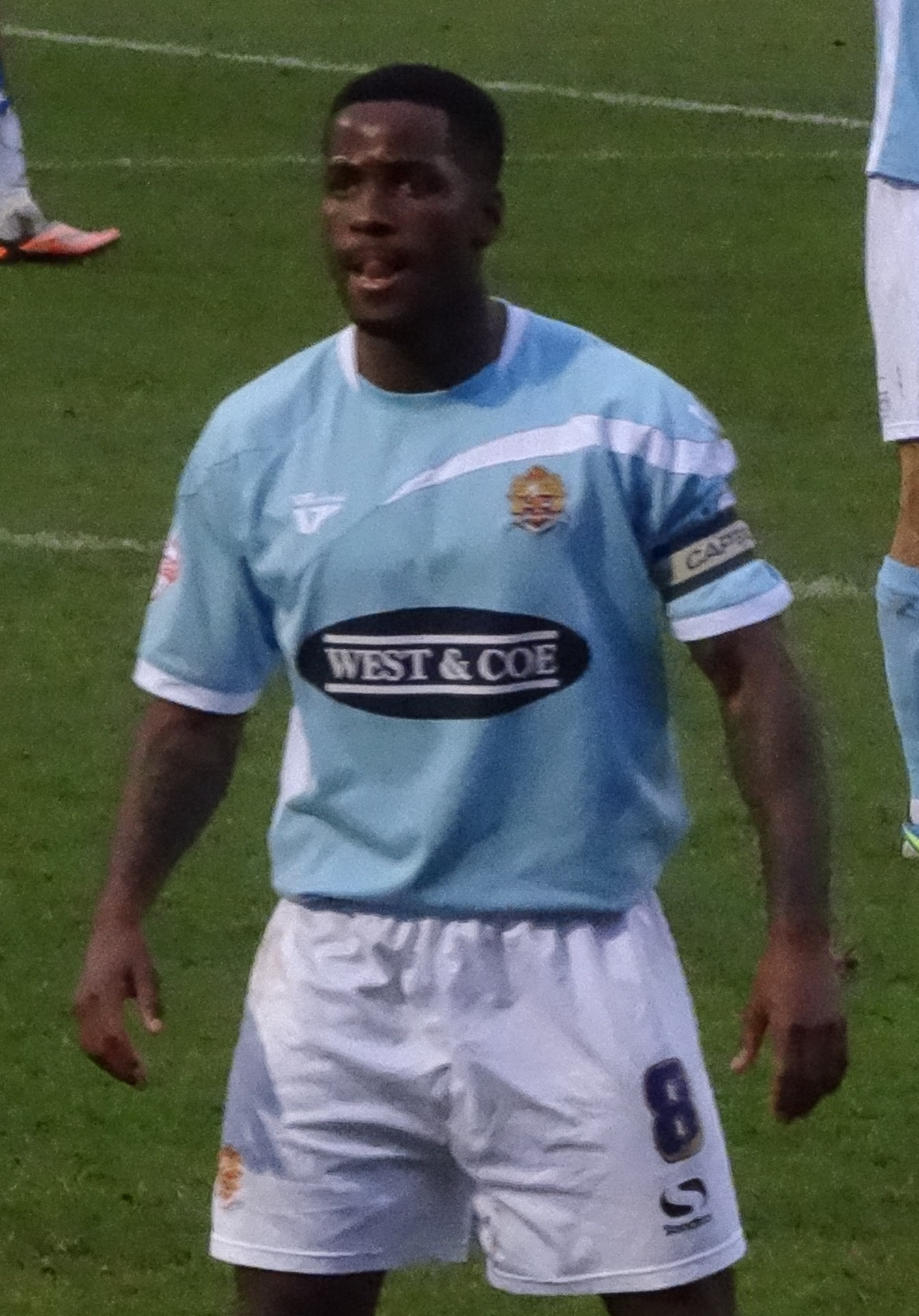
- Ogogo in 2014

Personal information
- Full name: Abumere Tafadzwa Ogogo
- Date of birth: 3 November 1989 (age 37)
- Place of birth: Epsom, England
- Height: 5 ft 8 in (1.73 m)
- Position: Midfielder

Youth career
- 2000–2004: Wimbledon
- 2004–2007: Arsenal

Senior career*
Years	Team	Apps	(Gls)
2007–2009	Arsenal	0	(0)
2008–2009	→ Barnet (loan)	9	(1)
2009–2015	Dagenham & Redbridge	225	(17)
2015–2018	Shrewsbury Town	103	(4)
2018–2019	Coventry City	10	(0)
2019–2021	Bristol Rovers	46	(3)
2020–2021	→ Dagenham & Redbridge (loan)	9	(0)
2021–2022	Southend United	6	(0)
Total		408	(25)
- * Club domestic league appearances and goals

Abumere Tafadzwa "Abu" Ogogo (born 3 November 1989) is an English retired professional footballer who played as a midfielder.

== Career ==
=== Youth and Arsenal ===
Ogogo began his career as a striker with his local Sunday league club when a scout from Wimbledon approached him for a trial. His trial was successful and he signed for Wimbledon, where he stayed until the club went into administration and the youth team disbanded due to the club's move to Milton Keynes.

He was spotted as a fourteen-year-old by Arsenal playing for Fulham and joined after successfully completing a six-week trial, along with former Wimbledon teammates Kieran Gibbs and James Dunne. He started a scholarship with the club in the summer of 2006, and came to prominence in the 2006–07 FA Youth Cup run, where Arsenal were seconds away from reaching the final. It was during this period that Arsenal converted Ogogo from a central midfielder to a right back. In September 2007, he signed his first professional contract with the club on a two-year deal. It was the first time that all the second-year scholars had received professional contracts. He remained a regular in the reserves and also featured twice on the bench in League Cup games. In October 2008, Ogogo joined Championship side Nottingham Forest on a two-week trial from Arsenal along with James Dunne and Paul Rodgers, with the view to a permanent deal. He featured in a reserve game victory over Shrewsbury Town but failed to earn a deal with Forest.

==== Barnet (loan) ====
In November 2008 he joined League Two side Barnet on a one-month loan. He made his debut for Barnet in the 4–0 home defeat by Notts County on 15 November 2008. He scored his first goal in senior football when he slotted home a Kenny Gillet cross in a 3–1 defeat to bottom of the table Luton Town. He then went on to receive a second booking and a subsequent red card. Later on in the month, his loan was extended for a further month until January, and then later extended until the end of the season. His Barnet career ended in disastrous fashion as he was sent off for handball in the final game of the season against Port Vale. He made a total of nine appearances for the club scoring once.

In May 2009, it was announced that he would be released by Arsenal, after failing to make a breakthrough at the club.

=== Dagenham & Redbridge ===
In June 2009, he signed for League Two side Dagenham & Redbridge on a two-year contract, as a direct replacement for Danny Foster who had recently departed to Brentford. His Daggers career got off to an indifferent start with Ogogo gaining a reputation for getting sent off. When Ogogo was sent off against Macclesfield Town in October 2009, he was consigned to a spell on the bench after the Daggers replaced him with loan signing Seth Nana Twumasi. He made his debut for the club in August 2009, in a 2–1 win at Crewe Alexandra, replacing Jon Nurse as a substitute on the right wing. When he returned to the side in a match against Shrewsbury Town, he came close to another red card following another reckless challenge. Ogogo admitted he learned the hard way, waiting for his chance and slowly cemented his place at right back in the Daggers side as they pushed for the play-offs. He featured for the side in the 2010 League Two play-off final win over Rotherham United at Wembley Stadium. In August 2010, he signed a new two-year contract extension with the Daggers. He took his impressive form into the club's maiden season in League One, showing his ability to play at a higher level during the 2010–11 season. However, he could not save the Daggers from relegation on the final game of the season in a 5–0 defeat to Peterborough United.

He continued to be a first team regular as the Daggers struggled on their return to League Two finishing in the bottom half of the table. In July 2012, he committed to another three-year contract with the club, after impressive for a third successive campaign. He was also appointed captain, succeeding from departing skipper Mark Arber. It was during the 2012–13 season that he was moved from right back to central midfield under new manager Wayne Burnett, after he convinced the manager for the opportunity to switch. However, the club struggled and had to battle for Football League survival, which came as a surprise to Ogogo. He went on to make his 200th appearance for the Daggers in February 2014, in a 1–1 draw with Burton Albion. In April 2014, Ogogo claimed the supporters' and club Player of the Year awards, after scoring nine goals during the campaign. In his final season for the club he made 39 appearances, with an injury set-back preventing him from making more appearances. In May 2015, it was announced that Ogogo would leave Dagenham & Redbridge in June 2015 when his contract expired as he wished to move on from the club.

=== Shrewsbury Town ===
On 1 June 2015 Ogogo signed a two-year deal with Shrewsbury Town, stepping back up to League One. He became a first-team regular, making his Shrewsbury debut on the opening day against Millwall, and scoring his first goal for the club in a 2–0 home win over Bury. His second goal of the season, an injury time effort against Grimsby Town in an FA Cup second-round replay, finally broke the deadlock after the preceding 180 goalless minutes in the tie, to set up a third-round trip to Cardiff City.

With Shrewsbury successfully avoiding relegation with one match to spare in their first season back in League One, Ogogo made more appearances for the club than any other player, and won both the Players' Player of the Year and overall Player of the Year awards for his consistent displays in midfield during 2015–16.

The following season, Ogogo became more of a peripheral figure in the final weeks of Micky Mellon's management at the club, but was almost ever-present in the first few months under new manager Paul Hurst, who praised him for his infectious good attitude. He suffered a knee injury in February 2017 likely to keep him out for the remainder of the season, although despite this the club opted to extend his contract until summer 2018, during his rehabilitation period.

Ahead of the 2017–18 season, Ogogo was appointed team captain, alongside club captain Mat Sadler.

=== Coventry City ===
After rejecting a contract offer to stay at Shrewsbury Town, Abu Ogogo agreed a three-year contract to join newly promoted League One side Coventry City on 26 June 2018.

=== Bristol Rovers ===
On 31 January 2019, Ogogo joined fellow League One club Bristol Rovers on a free transfer, and made his debut two days later in a 2–1 away win at Southend United, playing the whole match. Ogogo scored his first goal for the club on 21 September 2019 in a 3–1 way win at AFC Wimbledon, equalising after Rovers had fallen behind.

==== Dagenham and Redbridge (loan) ====
Having not been given a shirt number for the 2020–21 season, on 23 October 2020 Ogogo dropped down to the National League to join former club Dagenham & Redbridge on loan until January 2021. The following day he made his debut, starting in an FA Cup 4th qualifying round victory over Hartley Wintney. Ogogo was made captain during his time at the club, making 13 appearances before returning to the Gas on 11 January 2021.

Following his return from his loan spell at Dagenham, Ogogo was reintegrated back into the first-team picture by manager Paul Tisdale, who had replaced Garner, and made his first appearance back for the club on 12 January 2021 in a 1–0 EFL Trophy defeat to AFC Wimbledon. He was again left out of the squad however for the second half of the season on account of an injury. At the end of the season it was announced that Ogogo's contract would not be renewed and he would be leaving the club.

=== Southend United ===
On 25 June 2021, Ogogo agreed to join recently relegated National League side Southend United on a one-year deal with the option for a second year. He left the club at the end of the season and then retired.

== Personal life ==
Ogogo, who is of Nigerian descent, was born in Epsom, Surrey and was raised in nearby Tadworth. He attended Merland Rise Primary School (now Epsom Downs Primary), and then The Beacon School in Banstead, Surrey.

== Career statistics ==
As of match played 30 October 2021

Appearances and goals by club, season and competition
Club	Season	League			FA Cup		League Cup		Other		Total	
Club	Season	Division	Apps	Goals	Apps	Goals	Apps	Goals	Apps	Goals	Apps	Goals
Arsenal	2008–09	Premier League	0	0	—		0	0	0	0	0	0
Barnet (loan)	2008–09	League Two	9	1	—		—		—		9	1
Dagenham & Redbridge	2009–10	League Two	30	2	0	0	1	0	4 (Note: One appearance in Football League Trophy, three in League Two play-offs)	0	35	2
Dagenham & Redbridge	2010–11	League One	33	1	2	0	1	0	1 (Note: Appearance(s) in Football League Trophy)	0	37	1
Dagenham & Redbridge	2011–12	League Two	40	1	6	0	1	0	1	0	48	1
Dagenham & Redbridge	2012–13	League Two	46	1	1	0	1	0	1	0	49	1
Dagenham & Redbridge	2013–14	League Two	44	8	1	0	1	0	3	1	49	9
Dagenham & Redbridge	2014–15	League Two	32	4	1	0	1	0	1	0	35	4
Dagenham & Redbridge	Total		225	17	11	0	6	0	11	1	253	18
Shrewsbury Town	2015–16	League One	42	2	4	1	2	0	2	0	50	3
Shrewsbury Town	2016–17	League One	26	0	2	0	2	0	2 (Note: Appearances in EFL Trophy)	0	32	0
Shrewsbury Town	2017–18	League One	35	2	2	0	1	0	4	0	42	2
Shrewsbury Town	Total		103	4	8	1	5	0	8	0	124	5
Coventry City	2018–19	League One	10	0	1	0	1	0	2	0	14	0
Bristol Rovers	2018–19	League One	16	0	0	0	0	0	0	0	16	0
Bristol Rovers	2019–20	League One	27	3	3	0	2	0	1	0	33	3
Bristol Rovers	2020–21	League One	3	0	—		0	0	1	0	4	0
Bristol Rovers	Total		46	3	3	0	2	0	2	0	53	3
Dagenham & Redbridge (loan)	2020–21	National League	9	0	3	0	—		1 (Note: Appearance in FA Trophy)	0	13	0
Southend United	2021–22	National League	6	0	0	0	—		0	0	6	0
Career total			408	25	26	1	14	0	24	1	472	27

== Honours ==
Dagenham & Redbridge

- Football League Two play-offs: 2010
