= Jon Nolan =

English footballer (born 1992)

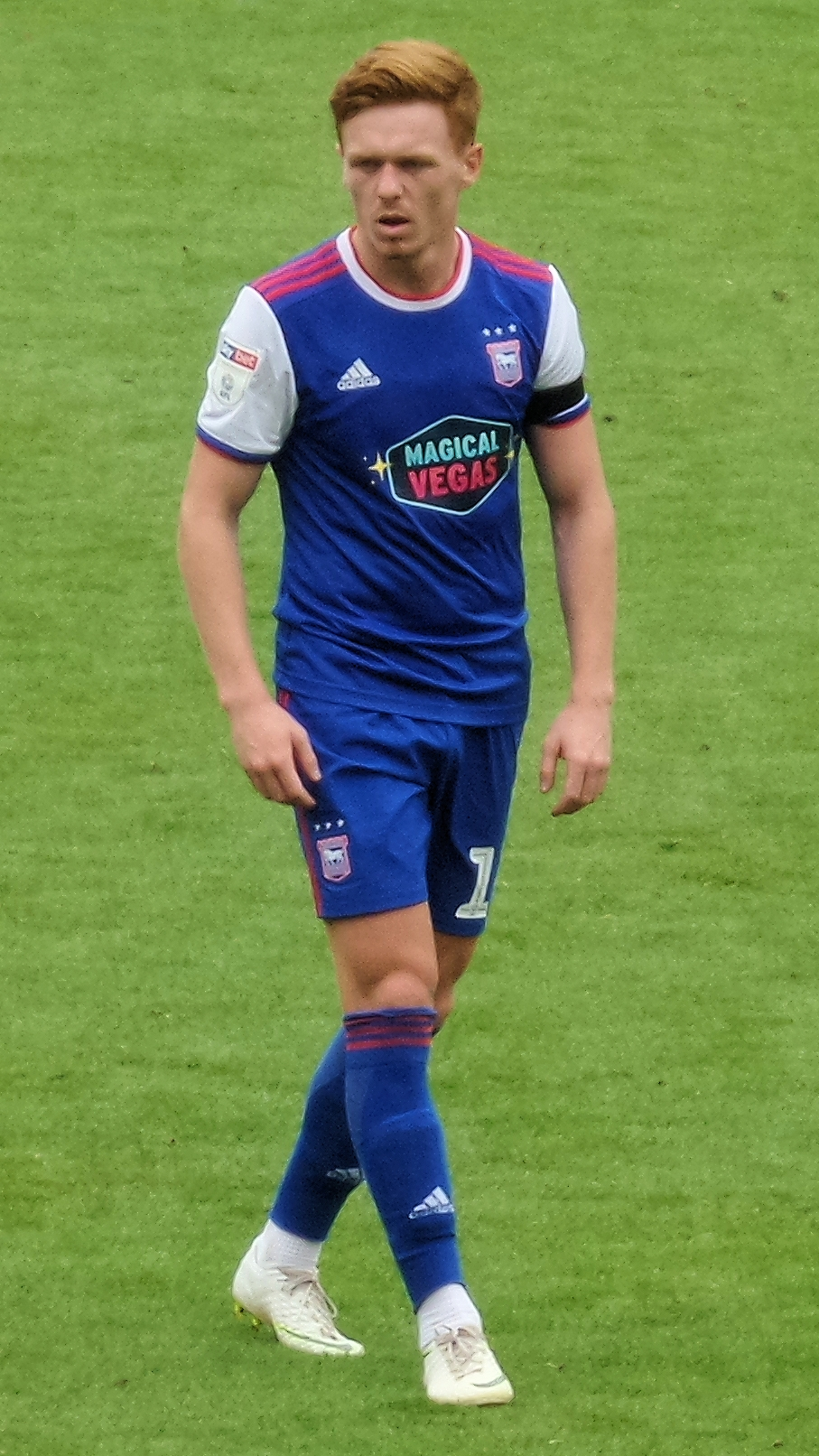
- Nolan in 2018

Personal information
- Full name: Jon Anthony Nolan
- Date of birth: 22 April 1992 (age 34)
- Place of birth: Huyton, England
- Height: 5 ft 11 in (1.80 m)
- Position: Midfielder

Youth career
- 2000–2011: Everton

Senior career*
Years	Team	Apps	(Gls)
2011–2013	Stockport County	62	(3)
2013–2016	Lincoln City	73	(6)
2015–2016	→ Wrexham (loan)	6	(0)
2016	Grimsby Town	18	(4)
2016–2017	Chesterfield	30	(1)
2017–2018	Shrewsbury Town	43	(9)
2018–2022	Ipswich Town	61	(8)
2022	Bristol Rovers	1	(0)
2022–2023	Tranmere Rovers	8	(0)
2023–2024	Macclesfield	5	(0)

International career^{‡}
2014	England C	1	
- * Club domestic league appearances and goals as of 13:10, 13 May 2024 (UTC) ‡ National team caps and goals as of 12:02, 16 March 2019 (UTC)

Jon Anthony Nolan (born 22 April 1992) is an English professional footballer who plays as a midfielder.

Nolan began his career with Everton, progressing through the club's academy before being released in 2011. He then went on to feature for Stockport County, Lincoln City and Wrexham. In 2016 he joined Grimsby Town and was part of the team that won the National League play-offs ensuring that The Mariners were promoted back to the Football League. Nolan picked up the "Supporters Young Player of the Season Award" but opted to join Chesterfield when his contract expired. After a season there, he moved to Shewsbury Town where he became player of the year. He signed for Ipswich Town in August 2018 where he remained for four years before a short spell with Bristol Rovers and a season with Tranmere Rovers.

== Club career ==
=== Stockport County ===
Born in Huyton, Merseyside, Nolan began his career with Everton's academy before joining Stockport County, who had just been relegated to the Conference Premier, in 2011. He made his senior debut on 26 August 2011 in a 1–1 draw away to Lincoln City, as a substitute for Nick Chadwick for the last ten minutes. He played 31 matches, all in the league, in his first season.

Nolan contributed three goals in 2012–13, as Stockport were relegated to the Conference North. His first career goal came in a 2–1 home win over Forest Green Rovers on 19 January 2013, and he also scored the winners in 3–2 victories at home to Nuneaton Borough on 2 February and away to Alfreton Town on 6 April. On 15 September 2012, he was sent off towards the end of a 2–1 loss to Woking at Edgeley Park.

=== Lincoln City ===
Following Stockport's relegation, Nolan became a free agent and joined Conference Premier team Lincoln on a one-year contract on 23 May 2013. Manager Gary Simpson told BBC Radio Lincolnshire that Nolan took a long time to seal his deal due to another offer from a wealthier team in the division, but he chose Lincoln for "footballing reasons". He made his debut on 10 August, playing the full 90 minutes of a goalless draw at Woking in the season opener. On 14 September, he scored his first goal for the Imps, equalising with the final kick of a 1–1 draw at Barnet.

On 10 January 2015, Nolan was sent off in the 18th minute of a 4–0 loss at Eastleigh for a foul on Will Evans.

==== Wrexham (loan) ====
Nolan signed on loan for fellow league team Wrexham on 1 October 2015, until the new year. He played six games for the Welsh club, starting two days later with their 3–2 loss at Chester in the Cross-border derby.

=== Grimsby Town ===
After being released prematurely from his contract at Lincoln, Nolan signed for their Lincolnshire derby rivals Grimsby Town in the National League on 21 January 2016, on a deal lasting until the end of the season. He was brought in by Paul Hurst, who also signed him for Shrewsbury Town and Ipswich Town later in his career.

He made 18 league appearances for the Mariners, scoring four goals, including a late winner in a 4–3 victory at Aldershot Town on 5 April. The team came fourth and qualified for the play-offs, where they contested the final at Wembley Stadium on 15 May against Forest Green Rovers. Grimsby won 3–1 to gain promotion to League Two, with Nolan's free kick leading to Omar Bogle's opening goal. A week later however, in the 2016 FA Trophy Final at the same venue, Grimsby lost 1–0 to relegated FC Halifax Town.

After impressing in his short time at the club, Nolan won the Grimsby Town Young Player of the Year award for the 2015–16 season.

=== Chesterfield ===
In May 2016 Nolan joined League One side Chesterfield on a free transfer after his Grimsby contract expired. He made his English Football League debut on 6 August 2016 in a 1–1 draw away at Oxford United, and scored his first goal for the club on 13 November, in an eventual 4–1 defeat to Sheffield United at the Proact Stadium.

On 3 December 2016, he was sent off in a 5–0 FA Cup second round loss to Wycombe Wanderers following a challenge on Dominic Gape, and he also received marching orders the following April in a goalless draw at Bolton Wanderers. The Spireites finished the season in last place and were relegated to League Two.

=== Shrewsbury Town ===
Following Chesterfield's relegation, Nolan moved to League One club Shrewsbury Town for an undisclosed fee on 12 June 2017, signing a three-year deal. The move re-united him with former Grimsby Town manager Paul Hurst. He scored his first goal for the club in a 1–0 win against Southend United on 12 September, helping set a new club record for Shrewsbury Town as their best ever start to a Football League campaign of six wins and a draw from their opening seven games.

Shrewsbury reached the 2018 EFL Trophy Final, which they lost at Wembley to Nolan's former team Lincoln on 8 April. The Shrews lost 1–0, with Nolan being praised in the Shropshire Star report, that said he "was involved in plenty of work as Lincoln chased his shadow and flew into every tackle". The team finished in third, and on 10 May, in the first leg of the play-off semi-final away to Charlton Athletic, Nolan scored the only goal from 25 yards out. His final game was the play-off final at Wembley on 28 May, lost 2–1 to Rotherham United after extra time.

In his only season at the New Meadow, Nolan was voted the club's Player of the Year.

=== Ipswich Town ===
After Shrewsbury failed to gain promotion, manager Paul Hurst left for Championship club Ipswich Town and began negotiating to sign both Nolan and defender Aristote Nsiala, whom he had worked with at both Shrewsbury and Grimsby. After the pair submitted their transfer requests, they were barred from training with or playing for the Shrews. Both Nolan and Nsiala signed for Ipswich on 8 August 2018, for a combined £2 million fee, signing three-year contracts with the option of an additional year's extension.

He made his debut for his new team on 11 August, starting in a 1–0 loss at Rotherham. He scored his first goal for the club in a 2–2 draw against Birmingham City on 29 September 2018. He made 28 appearances during his first season at Portman Road, scoring 3 goals. His season was ended early after he suffered a calf injury during a 0–2 home loss to Hull City on 30 March 2018.

Nolan returned to first-team action on 31 August 2019, featuring as a second-half substitute in a 3–0 home win over former team Shrewsbury in League One, following Ipswich's relegation. He scored his first goal of the season in a 0–1 away win over Milton Keynes Dons on 17 September. He scored twice in 25 appearances during the 2019–20 season.

On 6 July 2020, Ipswich announced that they had taken up the option to extend Nolan's contract by an additional year, keeping him at the club until 2022. He featured regularly during the early part of the 2020–21 season, despite suffering from minor calf and groin injuries, whilst also serving a three-match suspension due to a red card he received in a match against Lincoln City on 24 October. He started the season in goal-scoring form, scoring 5 goals in his first 15 appearances of the season in all competitions. In February, Nolan was sent to train with Ipswich's under-23s side along with teammate Kayden Jackson after falling out with manager Paul Lambert. He returned the first team following Lambert's departure later that month, but suffered a collateral ligament injury a few days later on 4 March, ruling him out for the rest of the season.

On 31 January 2022, having failed to make an appearance since his injury, Nolan's contract was terminated by mutual consent.

=== Bristol Rovers ===
On 1 February 2022, Nolan joined League Two club Bristol Rovers on a free transfer. He made his debut off of the bench on the 5 March 2022 in a 1–0 away defeat to Newport County.

Manager Joey Barton admitted it had been hard for Nolan to break into the first team following his year on the side lines at Ipswich through injury, but had been making good progress.

Following Rovers promotion to EFL League One, Nolan was not retained and was released at the end of the season.

=== Tranmere Rovers ===
On 30 June 2022, Nolan signed a one-year deal with EFL League Two side Tranmere Rovers. On 10 May 2023, it was announced that Nolan was not on the retained list for the 2023–24 season.

=== Macclesfield ===
On 20 July 2023, Nolan dropped back into Non-league football for the first time in seven years by signing a one-year deal with Northern Premier League side Macclesfield. He was released at the end of the season.

== International career ==
Nolan was first called up to the England C squad in 2014. He made his International debut on 18 November 2014 in a 4–2 win over Estonia U23.

== Career statistics ==
As of match played 5 March 2022

Appearances and goals by club, season and competition
Club	Season	League			FA Cup		League Cup		Other		Total	
Club	Season	Division	Apps	Goals	Apps	Goals	Apps	Goals	Apps	Goals	Apps	Goals
Stockport County	2011–12	Conference Premier	31	0	0	0	—		2 (Note: Appearance(s) in FA Trophy)	0	33	0
Stockport County	2012–13	Conference Premier	31	3	0	0	—		1	0	32	3
Stockport County	Total		62	3	0	0	—		3	0	65	3
Lincoln City	2013–14	Conference Premier	32	5	3	0	—		2	0	37	5
Lincoln City	2014–15	Conference Premier	34	1	2	0	—		1	0	37	1
Lincoln City	2015–16	National League	7	0	0	0	—		0	0	7	0
Lincoln City	Total		73	6	5	0	—		3	0	81	6
Wrexham (loan)	2015–16	National League	6	0	0	0	—		0	0	6	0
Grimsby Town	2015–16	National League	18	4	0	0	—		7 (Note: Four appearances and one goal in FA Trophy, three appearances in National League play-offs)	1	25	5
Chesterfield	2016–17	League One	30	1	2	0	0	0	5 (Note: Appearance(s) in EFL Trophy)	0	37	1
Shrewsbury Town	2017–18	League One	43	9	4	0	1	0	7 (Note: Four appearances in EFL Trophy, three appearances and one goal in League One play-offs)	1	55	10
Ipswich Town	2018–19	Championship	26	3	1	0	1	0	—		28	3
Ipswich Town	2019–20	League One	22	2	2	0	0	0	1	0	25	2
Ipswich Town	2020–21	League One	13	3	1	1	2	0	1	1	17	5
Ipswich Town	2021–22	League One	0	0	0	0	0	0	0	0	0	0
Ipswich Town	Total		61	8	4	1	3	0	2	1	70	10
Bristol Rovers	2021–22	League Two	1	0	—		—		0	0	1	0
Career total			294	31	15	1	4	0	27	3	340	35

== Honours ==
Grimsby Town

- National League play-offs: 2016
- FA Trophy runner-up: 2015–16

Shrewsbury Town

- EFL Trophy runner-up: 2017–18

Bristol Rovers

- EFL League Two promoted: 2021–22

Individual

- Grimsby Town Young Player of the Year: 2015–16
- Shrewsbury Town Player of the Year: 2017–18
- Shrewsbury Town Players' Player of the Year: 2017–18
