= Nick Wright (footballer, born 1987) =

English footballer

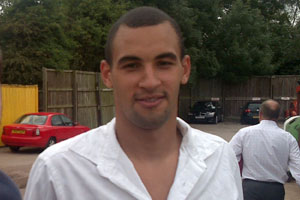

Personal information
- Date of birth: 25 November 1987 (age 38)
- Place of birth: Birmingham, England
- Position: Striker

Youth career
- Birmingham City

Senior career*
Years	Team	Apps	(Gls)
2005–2007	Birmingham City	0	(0)
2006	→ Tamworth (loan)	1	(0)
2006	→ Bristol City (loan)	4	(0)
2006	→ Northampton Town (loan)	4	(0)
2007	→ Ashford Town (Kent) (loan)	10	(4)
2007	Halesowen Town	8	(3)
2007–2010	Tamworth	87	(28)
2010–2012	Kidderminster Harriers	82	(23)
2012–2013	Mansfield Town	17	(1)
2013–2014	Lincoln City	19	(2)
2014	→ Kidderminster Harriers (loan)	9	(1)
2014–2015	Worcester City	25	(4)
2015	Gloucester City	1	(0)
2015	Corby Town	1	(0)
2015	Kettering Town		
2015	Rushall Olympic		
2015–2016	Alvechurch		
2016–	Sporting Khalsa		

International career^{‡}
2008–	England C	3	(0)
- * Club domestic league appearances and goals as of 16:52, 27 March 2015 (UTC) ‡ National team caps and goals as of 19:30, 31 March 2015 (UTC)

Nicholas "Nick" Wright (born 25 November 1987) is an English footballer who plays as a striker.

Wright played in the Football League for Bristol City and Northampton Town while on loan from Birmingham City where he began his career. He went on to play non-league football for a variety of clubs: three years at Tamworth, two with Kidderminster Harriers, and shorter periods for Ashford Town (Kent), Halesowen Town, Mansfield Town, Lincoln City and Worcester City.

In 2008, he was first capped by England C, the team that represents England internationally at semi-professional level.

== Club career ==
=== Birmingham City ===
Wright was born in Birmingham, West Midlands. He joined Birmingham City's youth academy when he was a teenager, but never progressed into the first-team. He spent spells on loan to several clubs before turning down Birmingham's offer of a new one-year contract, and left the club at the end of the 2006–07 season.

==== Loans ====
In January 2006, Wright joined Conference Premier strugglers Tamworth on loan. During his spell with the Lambs, Wright appeared in their FA Cup Third Round game against Championship club Stoke City. He also played in the replay at The Lamb Ground, in which Tamworth lost 5–4 on penalties.

Wright joined League One club Bristol City on a month's loan on 12 October 2006 to gain first team experience. The loan was not extended following the death of Wright's grandfather. He joined Northampton Town, also of League One, on loan at the end of November, and went on to make five appearances. Wright and Birmingham teammate Asa Hall spent the last month of the 2006–07 season helping Ashford Town (Kent) avoid relegation from the Isthmian League Division One South.

=== Tamworth ===
After leaving Birmingham City, Wright spent a couple of months on non-contract terms at Halesowen Town, for whom he scored three goals from eight matches in the Southern League Premier Division. He returned to Tamworth, who were by then in the Conference North, on 17 October 2007, and signed until the end of the season. On 12 February 2008, Wright scored all three goals in a 3–1 away win at Vauxhall Motors. This was the first time a Tamworth player had scored a hat-trick since Marcus Ebdon's three goals in a 5–0 win against Gresley Rovers in the FA Trophy in January 2005. Just four days later, he scored another hat-trick as Tamworth beat Hucknall Town 4–0 at home.

Wright finished the season with 15 goals, and re-signed for 2008–09. In September 2008, Tamworth rejected an offer from former manager Mark Cooper, then with Conference side Kettering Town, for Wright's services, and confirmed that the player was "happy to still be a Tamworth player". On 21 April 2009, Wright scored the only goal of the match against local rivals Hinckley United to confirm Tamworth's promotion as champions back to the top flight of non-league football.

Wright was placed on the transfer list by Gary Mills in December 2009 to "freshen up" his squad. A move to Stevenage Borough fell through when the player could not agree personal terms, and a chipped ankle bone and damaged ligaments suffered in February 2010 kept him out for most of what remained of the season.

=== Kidderminster Harriers ===
In the subsequent summer Wright left Tamworth, signing a one-year deal with another Midlands-based Conference Premier team, Kidderminster Harriers. He scored his first goal for the club in a 4–3 home loss to Southport on 17 August, and added a further two goals in a 2–2 draw away to Wrexham seven days later. His fourth goal came in a 3–1 home win against Hayes and Yeading on 11 September, and despite appearing in a further nine games that was his last goal of 2010. 2011 started much more brightly; Wright scored in the third minute against former employers Tamworth on 3 January, and he finished the season with 8, from 39 Conference matches.

Wright produced one of his most influential performances against Newport County on 9 April 2012 when he recorded a ten-minute hat-trick at Aggborough. He came on as a substitute after an hour, with Newport 2–0 up, and converted a penalty in the 86th minute. In stoppage time, the turnround was complete when he scored twice more, in the 94th and 96th minutes, to seal a 3–2 win. He was Kidderminster's top scorer for 2011–12, with 15 goals from 43 Conference matches, and turned down the offer of a new contract.

=== Conference ===
On 11 June 2012, Wright joined another Conference club, Mansfield Town, on a free transfer. Manager Paul Cox said of him: "He has a good goal scoring ratio, which I feel we can improve on next season. He can play anywhere along the frontline and has pace in abundance. Nick is a young player who has the ability to play in the Football League." He made only four starts and thirteen substitute appearances, scoring once, as Mansfield won the Conference title and promotion to the Football League, and his contract was not renewed.

Lincoln City signed Wright for 2013–14, but he never established himself in the first team, made his last Conference appearance in January 2014, and rejoined Kidderminster Harriers in mid-March on loan till the end of the season. He made nine appearances for the Harriers scoring once, in a 1–1 draw at Forest Green Rovers.

=== Conference North ===
After a seven-month spell at Conference North club Worcester City, during which he scored 5 goals from 34 appearances in all competitions, Wright joined divisional rivals Gloucester City on a non-contract basis on 26 March 2015.

=== Corby Town ===
Wright joined Corby Town in the Conference North in August 2015 after playing in the Steel Park Cup, joining on Non-Contract basis he made one appearance off the bench against Curzon Ashton and was an unused substitute vs Gloucester City.

=== Kettering Town ===
On 18 August 2015, Wright joined Kettering Town.

=== Rushall Olympic ===
His stay with Kettering Town would last a month before he was on the move again, joining Rushall Olympic where he debuted in the 3-1 Northern Premier League Premier Division away victory against Salford City on 19 September 2015.

=== Sporting Khalsa ===
Wright signed for Sporting Khalsa in July 2016, following his departure from Alvechurch.

== International career ==
In recognition of his goalscoring for Tamworth, Wright was selected on standby for England C, the team that represents England internationally at semi-professional level, for a match against Italy Lega Pro U21 on 12 November 2008. He was the only outfielder playing below Conference Premier level to be included. Injuries to other players meant he was called into the travelling squad and made his debut as a late substitute as England drew 2–2 to qualify for the final of the 2007–09 International Challenge Trophy. Wright was also capped in September 2009 against a Hungary U20 warming up for the 2009 FIFA U-20 World Cup, and against Poland U23 in November.

== Club statistics ==
As of 8 August 2014

Club statistics
Club	Season	League			FA Cup		League Cup		Other		Total	
Club	Season	Division	Apps	Goals	Apps	Goals	Apps	Goals	Apps	Goals	Apps	Goals
Birmingham City	2005–06	Premier League	0	0	0	0	0	0	–		0	0
Birmingham City	2006–07	Championship	0	0	0	0	0	0	–		0	0
Birmingham City	Total		0	0	0	0	0	0	–		0	0
Tamworth (loan)	2005–06	Conference Premier	1	0	2	0	–		–		3	0
Bristol City (loan)	2006–07	League One	4	0	0	0	–		1 (Note: Appearances in Football League Trophy)	0	5	0
Northampton Town (loan)	2006–07	League One	4	0	1	0	–		–		5	0
Ashford Town (Kent) (loan)	2006–07	Isthmian League Div One Sth	10	4	–		–		–		10	4
Halesowen Town (loan)	2007–08	Southern League Premier	8	3	3	1	–		1 (Note: Appearance in Birmingham Senior Cup)	0	12	4
Tamworth	2007–08	Conference North	30	11	–		–		9 (Note: 5 appearances 2 goals in FA Trophy, 3 appearances 2 goals in Conference League Cup, 1 appearance in Staffordshire Senior Cup)	4	39	15
Tamworth	2008–09	Conference North	32	13	3	0	–		4 (Note: 1 appearance in FA Trophy, 1 in Conference League Cup, 2 in Birmingham Senior Cup)	0	39	13
Tamworth	2009–10	Conference Premier	25	4	1	0	–		2 (Note: Appearances in FA Trophy)	0	28	4
Tamworth	Total		87	28	4	0	–		15	4	106	32
Kidderminster Harriers	2010–11	Conference Premier	39	8	1	0	–		1 (Note: Appearance in Worcestershire Senior Cup)	0	41	8
Kidderminster Harriers	2011–12	Conference Premier	43	15	2	0	–		5 (Note: 4 appearances and 2 goals in FA Trophy, 1 appearance in Worcestershire Senior Cup)	2	50	17
Kidderminster Harriers	Total		82	23	3	0	–		6	2	91	25
Mansfield Town	2012–13	Conference Premier	17	1	2	0	–		1	0	20	1
Lincoln City	2012–13	Conference Premier	19	2	4	0	–		3	0	26	2
Kidderminster Harriers (loan)	2013–14	Conference Premier	9	1	–		–		–		9	1
Worcester City	2014–15	Conference North	25	4	7	1	–		2 (Note: 1 appearance in FA Trophy, 1 in Worcestershire Senior Cup)	0	34	5
Gloucester City	2014–15	Conference North	1	0	–		–		–		1	0
Career total			267	66	26	2	0	0	29	6	322	74
