= Rob Elvins =

English footballer (born 1986)

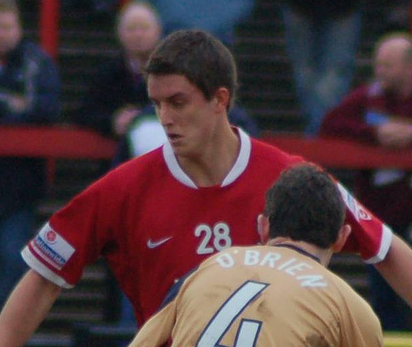
- Elvins playing for York City in 2007

Personal information
- Full name: Robert Mark Elvins
- Date of birth: 17 September 1986 (age 40)
- Place of birth: Alvechurch, England
- Positions: Striker; midfielder; defender

Youth career
- ?–2005: West Bromwich Albion

Senior career*
| Years | Team | Apps | (Gls) |
| 2005–2007 | West Bromwich Albion | 0 | (0) |
| 2006 | → Cheltenham Town (loan) | 5 | (0) |
| 2007 | → York City (loan) | 9 | (0) |
| 2007–2009 | Aldershot Town | 52 | (8) |
| 2009 | → Woking (loan) | 9 | (1) |
| 2009–2013 | Worcester City | 177 | (16) |
| 2013–2015 | Solihull Moors | 72 | (3) |
| 2015–2016 | Worcester City | 12 | (0) |
| 2016– | Halesowen Town | 9 | (0) |
- * Club domestic league appearances and goals as of 03:07, 26 September 2015 (UTC)

Robert Mark Elvins (born 17 September 1986) is a professional footballer who played most recently for Leamington as a midfielder.

== Career ==
=== West Bromwich Albion ===
Elvins was born in Alvechurch, Worcestershire and progressed through the youth system at West Bromwich Albion. He played a number of times for the reserve team and won the club's Young Player of the Year award for the 2004–05 season. He failed to make a single appearance for the first team, however; he was an unused substitute in a third round FA Cup replay at Reading in January 2006. Elvins was loaned out to League One team Cheltenham Town for a month on 8 September 2006. On 31 January 2007, Elvins joined Conference National team York City on a month's loan. His loan at York was extended for a second month on 6 March 2007.

=== Aldershot Town ===
Elvins was signed by Aldershot Town on 27 June 2007 after being released by West Brom at the end of the 2006–07 season. He made his debut in a 2–1 victory over Kidderminster Harriers and played in 40 games and scored seven goals for the side as they won the Conference Premier in the 2007–08 season. He was loaned out to Woking for the remainder of the 2008–09 season on 10 February 2009. He made his debut in a 1–0 defeat to Kettering Town on 14 February. He scored the equalising goal for Woking in a 1–1 draw against Wrexham on 14 March. He returned to Aldershot from his loan spell early on 7 April. Aldershot manager Gary Waddock confirmed Elvins would be released by Aldershot at the end of the season.

=== Worcester City ===
Following his release by Aldershot, Elvins had trials with Rushden & Diamonds and Kidderminster Harriers, and received offers from two other clubs before deciding to sign for Conference South team Worcester City on 24 July.

On 16 May 2013, Elvins and teammate Mathew Birley left Worcester for Conference North club Solihull Moors.

== Honours ==
Aldershot Town

- Conference Premier: 2007–08

== Career statistics ==
Appearances and goals by club, season and competition
| Club | Season | League | | | FA Cup | | League Cup | | Other | | Total | |
| Club | Season | Division | Apps | Goals | Apps | Goals | Apps | Goals | Apps | Goals | Apps | Goals |
|---|---|---|---|---|---|---|---|---|---|---|---|---|
| West Bromwich Albion | 2005–06 | Premier League | 0 | 0 | 0 | 0 | 0 | 0 | 0 | 0 | 0 | 0 |
| West Bromwich Albion | 2006–07 | Championship | 0 | 0 | 0 | 0 | 0 | 0 | 0 | 0 | 0 | 0 |
| West Bromwich Albion | Total | | 0 | 0 | 0 | 0 | 0 | 0 | 0 | 0 | 0 | 0 |
| Cheltenham Town (loan) | 2006–07 | League One | 5 | 0 | 0 | 0 | 0 | 0 | 0 | 0 | 5 | 0 |
| York City (loan) | 2006–07 | Conference Premier | 9 | 0 | 0 | 0 | — | | 0 | 0 | 9 | 0 |
| Aldershot Town | 2007–08 | Conference Premier | 36 | 7 | 1 | 0 | — | | 3 (Note: 2 appearances in Conference League Cup, 1 appearance in FA Trophy) | 0 | 40 | 7 |
| Aldershot Town | 2008–09 | League Two | 15 | 1 | 2 | 0 | 0 | 0 | 1 (Note: Appearance(s) in Football League Trophy) | 1 | 18 | 2 |
| Aldershot Town | Total | | 51 | 8 | 3 | 0 | 0 | 0 | 4 | 1 | 58 | 9 |
| Woking (loan) | 2008–09 | Conference Premier | 9 | 1 | 0 | 0 | — | | 0 | 0 | 9 | 1 |
| Worcester City | 2009–10 | Conference South | 32 | 8 | 3 | 0 | — | | 7 (Note: 5 appearances and 1 goal in FA Trophy, 2 appearances and 2 goals in Worcestershire Senior Cup) | 3 | 42 | 11 |
| Worcester City | 2010–11 | Conference North | 31 | 1 | 0 | 0 | — | | 3 (Note: Appearance(s) in FA Trophy) | 0 | 34 | 1 |
| Worcester City | 2011–12 | Conference North | 31 | 4 | 0 | 0 | — | | 0 | 0 | 31 | 4 |
| Worcester City | 2012–13 | Conference North | 38 | 3 | 1 | 0 | — | | 0 | 0 | 39 | 3 |
| Worcester City | Total | | 132 | 16 | 4 | 0 | 0 | 0 | 10 | 3 | 146 | 19 |
| Solihull Moors | 2013–14 | Conference North | 37 | 1 | 1 | 0 | — | | 0 | 0 | 38 | 1 |
| Solihull Moors | 2014–15 | Conference North | 35 | 2 | 0 | 0 | — | | 1 | 0 | 36 | 2 |
| Solihull Moors | Total | | 72 | 3 | 1 | 0 | 0 | 0 | 1 | 0 | 74 | 3 |
| Worcester City | 2014–15 | Conference North | 6 | 0 | 0 | 0 | — | | 0 | 0 | 6 | 0 |
| Worcester City | 2015–16 | National League North | 6 | 0 | 0 | 0 | — | | 0 | 0 | 6 | 0 |
| Worcester City | Total | | 12 | 0 | 0 | 0 | 0 | 0 | 0 | 0 | 12 | 0 |
| Leamington | 2015–16 | Southern League Premier Division | 5 | 0 | 0 | 0 | — | | 0 | 0 | 5 | 0 |
| Leamington | 2016–17 | Southern League Premier Division | 5 | 0 | 1 | 0 | — | | 0 | 0 | 6 | 0 |
| Leamington | Total | | 10 | 0 | 1 | 0 | 0 | 0 | 0 | 0 | 11 | 0 |
| Career total | | | 300 | 28 | 9 | 0 | 0 | 0 | 15 | 4 | 324 | 32 |
