= Mat Sadler =

English footballer (born 1985)

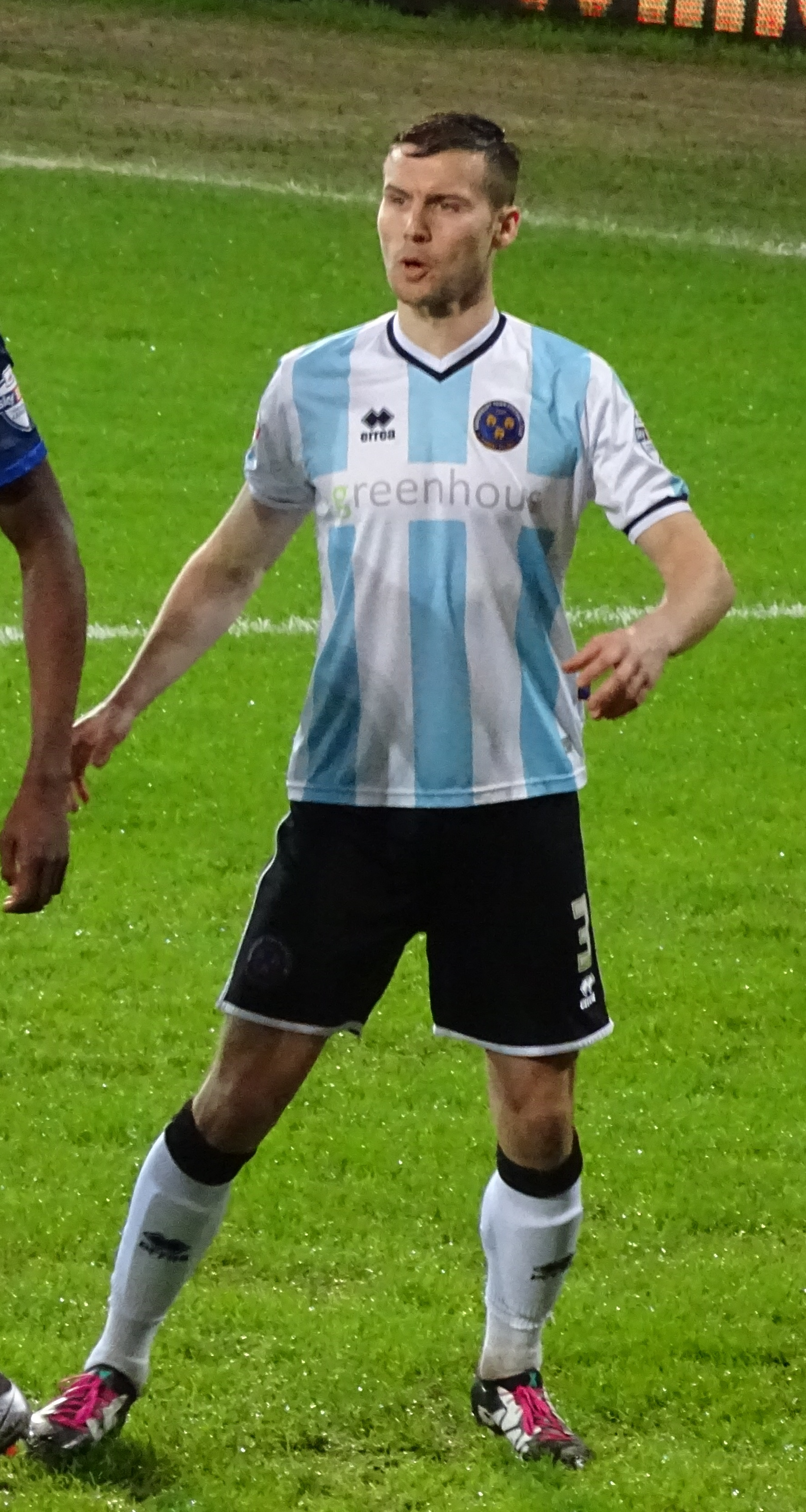
- Sadler playing for Shrewsbury Town in 2016

Personal information
- Full name: Mathew John Sadler
- Date of birth: 26 February 1985 (age 41)
- Place of birth: Birmingham, West Midlands, England
- Height: 5 ft 11 in (1.80 m)
- Position: Defender

Team information
- Current team: Lommel (assistant manager)

Youth career
- –2002: Birmingham City

Senior career*
Years	Team	Apps	(Gls)
2002–2008	Birmingham City	51	(0)
2003–2004	→ Northampton Town (loan)	7	(0)
2008–2011	Watford	30	(0)
2010	→ Stockport County (loan)	20	(0)
2010–2011	→ Shrewsbury Town (loan)	46	(0)
2011–2012	Walsall	46	(1)
2012–2014	Crawley Town	92	(2)
2014–2015	Rotherham United	0	(0)
2014	→ Crawley Town (loan)	10	(0)
2015	→ Oldham Athletic (loan)	8	(0)
2015–2019	Shrewsbury Town	129	(5)
2019–2022	Walsall	53	(3)
Total		492	(11)

International career
2001–2002	England U17	9	(0)
2003	England U18	1	(0)
2003	England U19	4	(0)

Managerial career
- 2023–2026: Walsall
- 2026–: Lommel (assistant)
- * Club domestic league appearances and goals

Mathew John Sadler (born 26 February 1985) is an English professional football manager and former player and is the current assistant manager of Lommel.

Sadler played as a left-footed defender, capable of playing either at full-back or as a centre-back. He played in the Premier League and the Football League for Birmingham City. He spent most of his career in the Football League, for Northampton Town, Watford, Stockport County, Shrewsbury Town, Walsall, Crawley Town, Rotherham United and Oldham Athletic.

== Club career ==
=== Birmingham City ===
Sadler was born in Birmingham, West Midlands. He began his career as a junior with Birmingham City. He made his first team debut on 2 October 2002 in a League Cup second round tie away at Leyton Orient, starting in the 3–2 win at Brisbane Road. A month later, he made his Premier League debut in a 3–1 home win over Bolton Wanderers, again as a starter.

On 21 November 2003, having not played for Birmingham that season, Sadler went on a two-month loan to Northampton Town, playing eight games, seven of which in the Third Division. In May 2004, signed a new contract to keep him at Birmingham. However, Sadler suffered ankle and foot problems.

On 7 February 2006, having not played for Birmingham since 28 December 2002 nor any team since 10 January 2004, Sadler made his return in a 2–1 home win over Reading in an FA Cup fourth round replay, coming on for Mathew Birley after 59 minutes. This was his only appearance until 1 April when he was in the first team to play Chelsea at home, a goalless draw. He stayed in the starting line-up for the remaining games, as the season ended with relegation. At the end of the 2005–06 season, Sadler was awarded the Radio WM Breakthrough Award at the club's annual dinner. He also signed a two–year contract with the club.

In the 2006–07 season, Sadler began to be first team regular in the left-back position. However, Sadler suffered a groin injury in training, resulting him missing out for four matches. Sadler then made his return to the first team on 30 September 2006, playing 90 minutes, in a 1–1 draw against Leicester City. Sadler played a role in a match against Coventry City on 31 October 2006 when he provided assist for Nicklas Bendtner to score the only goal of the game with a win. After this, Sadler continued to be a first team regular in the left-back position for the remainder of the season until he was dropped from the first team ahead of the match in favour of Stephen Kelly against Barnsley on 9 April 2007. Manager Steve Bruce explained his decision to leave out Sadler of the squad. As a result, Sadler never played again for the remainder of the 2006–07 season, as Birmingham City were promoted back to the Premier League. Despite this, Sadler made thirty–six appearances. Nevertheless, Sadler then signed a three–year contract with the club, keeping him until 2010.

In the 2007–08 season saw Sadler suffered a knock and Achilles problem at the start of the season. After missing out the first two matches, Sadler made his first appearance of 2007–08 when he came on as a substitute for Fabrice Muamba in the 80th minute, in a 1–0 loss against West Ham United on 18 August 2007. Sadler then provided assist for Garry O'Connor in the 27th minute, in the first round of the League Cup, in a 2–1 win over Hereford United on 28 August 2007. However, Sadler struggled for the first team place after losing his left-back position to Franck Queudrue and Liam Ridgewell. As a result, Sadler was sent to play in the reserve. But in December, Sadler returned to the first team in the left-back position in his first league appearance since December, in a 2–1 loss against Newcastle United on 8 December 2007. However, on his next appearance against Reading, Sadler came under criticism when his back-pass short led to goalkeeper Maik Taylor brought down Stephen Hunt in the penalty box, leading Hunt to take the penalty himself and converted the penalty successfully. After the match, Taylor defended Sadler, stating he could one day bounce back.

After appearing one more appearance, Sadler was left out of the squad once again and attracted interests from clubs around England. Upon joining Watford, Sadler said it was an honour to play for Birmingham City, the team he grew up supporting, and regretted not playing enough games for the club.

=== Watford ===
Sadler joined Watford on 24 January 2008 for an initial fee of £750,000, rising to £900,000 depending on appearances. He signed a three-and-a-half-year contract.

Sadler made his Watford debut on 29 January 2008, making his first start for the club, in a 1–1 draw against Sheffield United. Despite the injury, Sadler was the regular in the first team for the remainder of 2007–08 season, making fifteen appearances.

In the 2008–09 season, Sadler started well, appearing for the first three matches to the start of the season until he suffered a lateral knee ligament injury. After missing out five matches, Sadler regained his first team place and then provided assist for Tamás Priskin to score the first goal of the game, in a 3–0 win over Southampton on 18 October 2008. Sadler, once again, sidelined when he suffered an injury that kept him out throughout November. Following his return, Sadler played against his former club, Birmingham City, on 6 December 2008, which saw Watford lost 3–2. Ahead of the match, Sadler stated he hope the club regain back to the Premier League. Sadler eventually fell from grace at Vicarage Road and made his final appearance for Watford on 26 December 2008 in a 2–4 home defeat to Bristol City. During the match, Sadler came under criticism when he conceded two goals before being substituted at half–time. As a result, Sadler was sent to play for the reserve for the remainder of the season and made fifteen appearances.

In 2009–10 season, Sadler remained on the sidelines. In October 2009, Sadler went on trial at Huddersfield Town Sadler played for the club's reserve on 14 October 2009 against Grimsby Town's reserve, where he provided assist on one of the goal, with a 3–1 win. However, Huddersfield Town decided against signing Sadler. After this, Sadler appeared seven times as an unused substitute. Sadler then joined Stockport County on loan in January 2010 and remained at Edgeley Park until the end of the League One season. His debut for the club took place on 30 January against Southampton. Sadler became a first team regular for the club, where he made twenty appearances. However, despite Sadler's best effort, the club were later relegated to League Two.

Sadler joined League Two club Shrewsbury Town on 7 July 2010 on loan for six months. According to manager Graham Turner, the player seemed reluctant initially to play in the fourth tier of English football but was won over by the club's ambition. Sadler made his Shrewsbury Town debut in the opening game of the season, in a 3 – 1 win over Bradford City. In the next game, Sadler played a role for the club when he provided assist for Matt Harrold to score the only goal in the game in a 1–0 win over Macclesfield Town. Since then, Sadler made an impressive display at Shrewsbury Town, having established himself in the first team and expressed interests of extending his loan spell at the club for the remainder of the season. On 6 January 2011 saw Sadler's loan spell at Shrewsbury Town extended until the end of the season. During the match against Port Vale on 8 March 2011, Sadler controversially fouled Tom Pope in a penalty box, leading to a penalty kick converted successfully, which resulted a 2–2 draw. Despite this, Sadler went on to be an ever-present player in the League Two season to play every minute of every game for his club. Sadler played in two matches in the play–offs against Torquay United, but lost 2–0 in the first leg and drew 0–0 in the second leg.

At the end of the 2010–11 season, it was announced that Sadler was one of the three players released by the club.

=== Walsall ===
After a successful loan spell at Shrewsbury Town, Sadler joined Walsall on 27 June 2011 on a one–year contract. He hoped to make a new start after a lack of first-team opportunities at Watford. Sadler made his Walsall debut in the opening game of the season, a 1–0 win over Leyton Orient. Against Hartlepool United seven days later, Walsall took an early lead via Jon Macken's penalty after Sadler was fouled; the match ended as a 1–1 draw. A few weeks into the season, manager Dean Smith dubbed him "Mr Reliable", because "He's solid, dependable and gets forward. He knows the game, is intelligent and has a fantastic attitude."

Against Huddersfield Town on 5 November, Sadler crossed the ball for Jamie Paterson's equaliser that ended a three-match losing streak. He was sent off for a second bookable offence against Charlton Athletic on 10 December, so was suspended for the FA Cup second round replay against Dagenham & Redbridge which Walsall lost in a penalty shootout; it would remain the only match he missed all season. Around that time he spoke of how painful he found the team's loss of form, which he took personally.

Facing Colchester United on 27 March 2012, in his 193rd league game (222nd in all competitions), Sadler scored his first senior goal, breaking what BBC Sport described as "one of football's longer droughts". The 3–1 win lifted Walsall out of the relegation places, and Florent Cuvelier's equaliser against Huddersfield on 28 April from Sadler's cross confirmed their safety. Sadler was voted player of the season by his team-mates and finished as runner-up to Andy Butler for the supporters' Player of the Year award, but despite Butler encouraging him to stay, he rejected Walsall's offer of a two-year contract.

=== Crawley Town ===
On 8 June 2012, Sadler joined newly promoted League One side Crawley Town on a free transfer after turning down a new two–year contract with the club. He cited manager Sean O'Driscoll's winning mentality as the reason he joined.

Sadler made his debut on 14 August, starting in a League Cup match as a left back against Championship side Millwall which ended 2–2, with Crawley winning 4–1 on penalties. Four days later, on 18 August 2012, Sadler made his league debut for Crawley Town, in the opening game of the season, in a 3–0 win over Scunthorpe United. Sadler then scored his first goal for the club on 5 March 2013, in a 1–1 draw against Carlisle United. In his first season at Crawley Town, Sadler went on to be an ever-present player in the League One season to play every minute of every game for his club, as he helped the club finish tenth place.

In the 2013–14 season, Sadler continued to regain his place in the first team, under the new management of Richie Barker. Sadler then score his first Crawley Town goal of the season on 17 August 2013, in a 2–1 loss against Rotherham United. Then on 21 September 2013, Sadler then provided assist for Emile Sinclair, in a 1–1 draw against Colchester United. Sadler made his 200th consecutive league appearance on 12 April 2014 against MK Dons. Like his first season at Crawley, Sadler was, once again, to be an ever-present player in the League One season to play every minute of every game for his club, as he helped the club finish fourteenth place.

At the end of the 2013–14 season, with his contract was about to run out, Sadler was among four players to be offered a new contract. However, due to weeks of delays, the club decided to withdraw the contract offer on Sadler and was released by the club in June. After leaving the club, Sadler was linked with a move to clubs around England and Scotland.

=== Rotherham United ===
Sadler joined newly promoted Championship side Rotherham United on a free transfer from Crawley Town on 17 June 2014. Upon joining the club, Sadler said he could not wait to play in the Championship with Rotherham United.

After appearing five times in pre–season friendly matches, it wasn't until on 26 August 2014 that Sadler made his Rotherham United debut in the second round of the League Cup, which saw them lose 1–0 against Swansea City. However, this turned out to be his only appearance in the League Cup, before returning to Crawley in September on loan. He was linked with a loan move to Notts County and Crewe Alexandra. Sadler then had a run in the first team, which lead to extending his loan spell for another month. After extending his loan spell, Sadler continued to remain in the first team before returning to his parent club on 13 November 2015.

When his loan expired, he returned to Rotherham, and made no further first-team appearances until joining Oldham Athletic on a month's loan in March 2015. Upon joining the club, Sadler was brought by Oldham Athletic as a replacement for Joseph Mills, who suffered a calf–injury. Sadler made his Oldham Athletic debut on 14 March 2015, in a 3–1 loss against Barnsley. Sadler then provided an assist for Conor Wilkinson on 21 March 2015, who scored the only goal of the game in a 1–0 win over Crewe Alexandra, to end the club's three match losing streak. After making eight appearances for the club, Sadler returned to his parent club on 13 April 2015.

At the end of the 2014–15 season, Sadler was released by the club.

=== Return to Shrewsbury ===
Following his release from Rotherham, Sadler signed for former loan club Shrewsbury Town in League One, on a two-year contract in May 2015.

Sadler's first game after signing for the club on a permanent basis came in the opening game of the season, in a 2–1 loss against Millwall. A regular in the side in the early part of the season, Sadler scored his first goal for the club in a 2–1 defeat to Chesterfield, but lost his place in the first-team after a run of poor personal form. Having been recalled for an FA Cup first round victory at non-league Gainsborough Trinity, he was praised for his "first class attitude" and determination by manager Micky Mellon. Sadler later scored his second goal of the season on 26 April 2016, in a 2–1 loss against Walsall.

Following a change in management early in the following season, Sadler found himself playing more often in a central defensive role under Paul Hurst. He was named team-captain for the first time, in the absence of Abu Ogogo and Adam El-Abd, in February 2017, and went on to win the Player of the year, Players' player of the year and Player in the community awards at the conclusion of the season, after helping Shrewsbury avoid relegation to League Two. Sadler subsequently signed a two-year contract extension, committing him to the club until summer 2019.

Ahead of the 2017–18 season, Sadler was appointed club captain, alongside team captain Abu Ogogo, leading the team to both the EFL Trophy final and the 2018 EFL League One play-off final, although they ultimately finished as runners-up on both occasions.

Immediately after the final match of the 2018–19, Sadler revealed that he would be leaving the club at the end of his contract, having clocked up over 200 appearances in all competitions, over two separate spells.

=== Return to Walsall ===
On 11 July 2019, Sadler returned to former club Walsall following his release from Shrewsbury Town at the end of the 2018–19 season.

Sadler announced his retirement at the end of the 2021–22 season.

== International career ==
Sadler played nine times for England under-17, including at the 2002 European Under-17 championships, appeared once for the under-18s, and played four times at under-19 level.

== Managerial career ==
=== Walsall ===
On 19 April 2023, Sadler was appointed interim manager of Walsall following the departure of Michael Flynn until the end of the 2022–23 season. On 18 May 2023, he was appointed head coach on a permanent basis.

On 7 January 2025, with Walsall sitting top of the league, ten points clear of second place, Sadler signed a new three-and-a-half year contract. Later that week, he was named EFL League Two Manager of the Month for December 2024 having won all six matches across the month. Despite a fifteen-point cushion to third-place as of the end of January 2025, a run of thirteen matches without a win saw the Saddlers fall into the play-off positions on the final day of the season, losing 1–0 to AFC Wimbledon in the 2025 EFL League Two play-off final.

Having put the disappointing end to the previous season behind them, an impressive start to the 2025–26 season saw Sadler named Manager of the Month for September 2025 after a run of ten points from four matches seeing the club move top of the league.

On 11 March 2026, Sadler was sacked following a run of just one win in eleven matches that left the club 11th in the table, having been four points clear at the top in early December.

On 20 July 2026, Sadler was appointed as assistant manager of Belgian Pro League side Lommel, working under compatriot Lee Johnson.

== Personal life ==
Sadler said in 2012 that when he retired from playing football, he might go back to education to get a degree. He co-founded a property investment company in 2017 while still playing for Shrewsbury Town.

== Career statistics ==
Appearances and goals by club, season and competition
Club	Season	League			FA Cup		League Cup		Other		Total	
Club	Season	Division	Apps	Goals	Apps	Goals	Apps	Goals	Apps	Goals	Apps	Goals
Birmingham City	2002–03	Premier League	2	0	0	0	2	0	—		4	0
Birmingham City	2003–04	Premier League	0	0	0	0	0	0	—		0	0
Birmingham City	2004–05	Premier League	0	0	0	0	0	0	—		0	0
Birmingham City	2005–06	Premier League	8	0	1	0	0	0	—		9	0
Birmingham City	2006–07	Championship	36	0	3	0	2	0	—		41	0
Birmingham City	2007–08	Premier League	5	0	0	0	2	0	—		7	0
Birmingham City	Total		51	0	4	0	6	0	—		61	0
Northampton Town	2003–04	Third Division	7	0	0	0	—		1 (Note: Appearances in Football League Trophy)	0	8	0
Watford	2007–08	Championship	15	0	1	0	—		2 (Note: Appearances in Football League play-offs)	0	18	0
Watford	2008–09	Championship	15	0	0	0	2	0	—		17	0
Watford	2009–10	Championship	0	0	0	0	0	0	—		0	0
Watford	2010–11	Championship	0	0	0	0	0	0	—		0	0
Watford	Total		30	0	1	0	2	0	2	0	35	0
Stockport County (loan)	2009–10	League One	20	0	—		—		—		20	0
Shrewsbury Town (loan)	2010–11	League Two	46	0	1	0	2	0	4 (Note: Two appearances in Football League Trophy, two in Football League Two play-offs)	0	53	0
Walsall	2011–12	League One	46	1	3	0	1	0	2	0	52	1
Crawley Town	2012–13	League One	46	1	3	0	3	0	0	0	52	1
Crawley Town	2013–14	League One	46	1	3	0	1	0	1	0	51	1
Crawley Town	Total		92	2	6	0	4	0	1	0	103	2
Rotherham United	2014–15	Championship	0	0	0	0	1	0	—		1	0
Crawley Town (loan)	2014–15	League One	10	0	—		—		2	0	12	0
Oldham Athletic (loan)	2014–15	League One	8	0	—		—		—		8	0
Shrewsbury Town	2015–16	League One	24	2	2	0	2	0	2	0	30	2
Shrewsbury Town	2016–17	League One	34	2	3	1	0	0	2 (Note: Appearances in EFL Trophy)	0	39	3
Shrewsbury Town	2017–18	League One	42	1	4	0	1	0	9 (Note: Six appearances in EFL Trophy, three in EFL League One play-offs)	0	56	1
Shrewsbury Town	2018–19	League One	29	0	6	0	0	0	0	0	35	0
Shrewsbury Town	Total		129	5	15	1	3	0	13	0	160	6
Walsall	2019–20	League Two	27	2	3	0	1	0	1	0	32	2
Walsall	2020–21	League Two	26	1	1	0	0	0	2	0	28	1
Walsall	Total		53	3	4	0	1	0	3	0	61	3
Career total			492	11	34	1	20	0	28	0	574	12

== Managerial statistics ==
As of match played 11 March 2026

Managerial record by team and tenure
Team	From	To	Record				
Team	From	To	P	W	D	L	Win %
Walsall	19 April 2023	11 March 2026	161	67	42	52	41.6
Total			161	67	42	52	41.6

== Honours ==
=== As a player ===
Shrewsbury Town

- EFL Trophy runner-up: 2017–18

=== As a manager ===
Individual

- EFL League Two Manager of the Month: December 2024, September 2025
