= Mathew Birley =

English footballer

Personal information
- Full name: Mathew Mark Birley
- Date of birth: 26 July 1986 (age 40)
- Place of birth: Bromsgrove, England
- Position: Midfielder

Team information
- Current team: Worcester City

Senior career*
Years	Team	Apps	(Gls)
2005–2007	Birmingham City	1	(0)
2006–2007	→ Lincoln City (loan)	4	(0)
2007–2008	Bromsgrove Rovers	31	(6)
2008–2009	Tamworth	7	(2)
2009	King's Lynn	6	(0)
2009–2013	Worcester City		
2013	Solihull Moors		
2016–2017	Halesowen Town		
2017–	Worcester City		
- * Club domestic league appearances and goals as of 18:05, 9 December 2012 (UTC)

Mathew Mark Birley (born 26 July 1986) is an English professional footballer who plays as a midfielder for Worcester City.

== Career ==
=== Birmingham City ===
Birley was born in Bromsgrove, Worcestershire. He trained in Birmingham City's Academy set-up and was a regular in the reserve side in the 2004–05 season. He held a one-year professional contract in the summer of 2005, which was extended for a further year in 2006.

Birley is a midfielder who can play on either wing and also scored several goals while in the Reserves, including the opening goal in the 2005 Birmingham Senior Cup final.

On 26 October 2005, he made his professional debut in the third round of the League Cup, replacing Mikael Forssell for the final 14 minutes of a 2–1 home win over Norwich City. Birley made his only Premier League appearance on 31 December, when he came on as a 65th-minute substitute for Emile Heskey in the match against Chelsea at Stamford Bridge that resulted in a 2–0 win for the London side. His only other first-team appearance for Birmingham was on 7 February 2006 in an FA Cup fourth-round replay against Reading, starting and making way for Mat Sadler after 59 minutes of a 2–1 win.

On 23 November 2006 he joined League Two team Lincoln City on loan. He made his debut in the 2–1 defeat at Wrexham two days later, and made three more appearances for the Sincil Bank club before returning to Birmingham in January 2007.

In May 2007, he underwent a trial at AFC Bournemouth where he featured for the reserve team. On 14 May, he was released from his Birmingham contract.

=== Non-league career ===
Birley later signed for Southern League Premier Division club Bromsgrove Rovers and scored on his debut for the club during their League game at home to Mangotsfield United.

In October 2008 Birley joined Conference North side Tamworth. He made his debut coming on as an 81st-minute substitute for Gareth Sheldon in the team's 4–1 away win at Workington on 18 October.

In June 2009, he moved to Northern Premier League Premier Division team King's Lynn, making his debut in the 1–3 home defeat to Stocksbridge Park Steels on 15 August. He left the club following the 2–1 away defeat to Buxton on 14 September. Although Lynn's manager Carl Heggs said he had been released for "not producing", Birley claimed it was his decision due to the length of commute from his home in Bromsgrove to Norfolk. He quickly linked up with Conference South team Worcester City, and made his first appearance in the 2–1 home defeat to Thurrock on 19 September.

On 16 May 2013, Birley and teammate Rob Elvins left Worcester for Conference North club Solihull Moors.

After a couple of years out of the game due to a groin injury, Birley joined Halesowen Town ahead of the 2016–17 season. Worcester City had retained his registration, and after playing occasionally for them during that season when Halesowen had no fixture, he rejoined the club in May 2017.
