= 2017–18 Barnet F.C. season =

Barnet
2017–18 season
- Chairman: Anthony Kleanthous
- Manager: Rossi Eames (until 13 November); Mark McGhee (from 13 November to 15 January); Graham Westley (from 15 January to 19 March); Martin Allen (from 19 March)
- Stadium: The Hive Stadium
- League Two: 23rd (relegated)
- FA Cup: First round
- EFL Cup: Second round
- EFL Trophy: Group Stage
- Top goalscorer: League: Shaq Coulthirst (10); All: Shaq Coulthirst (12)
- Highest home attendance: 5,539 vs Chesterfield (5 May 2018)
- Lowest home attendance: 1,123 vs Morecambe (16 December 2017) (league); 445 vs Tottenham Hotspur U23 (28 November 2017) (all)

The 2017–18 season is Barnet's 130th year in existence and third consecutive season in League Two. Along with competing in League Two, the club also participate in the FA Cup, EFL Cup and EFL Trophy.

== Transfers ==
=== Transfers in ===
Date from	Position	Nationality	Name	From	Fee	Ref.
1 July 2017	GK	(England)	Craig Ross	Macclesfield Town	Free	
10 July 2017	DF	(England)	Richard Brindley	Colchester United	Free	
26 July 2017	CF	(England)	Shaq Coulthirst	Peterborough United	Free	
26 August 2017	DF	(England)	Andre Blackman	Crawley Town	Free	
31 August 2017	CF	(England)	Malakai Mars	Chelsea	Undisclosed	
31 August 2017	CF	(England)	Dave Tarpey	Maidenhead United	Undisclosed	
1 January 2018	MF	(Nigeria)	Fuad Sule	Bohemians	Undisclosed	
31 January 2018	MF	(England)	Jordan Nicholson	Peterborough United	Undisclosed	
10 March 2018	DF	(Guyana)	Matthew Briggs	Chesterfield	Free	
March 2018	CF	(England)	Jordan Brown	Hannover 96 II	Free	

=== Transfers out ===
Date from	Position	Nationality	Name	To	Fee	Ref.
1 July 2017	CF	(England)	Sam Akinde	Hemel Hempstead Town	Released	(Note: Sam Akinde joined Hemel Hempstead Town following his release.)
1 July 2017	CF	(England)	Shaun Batt	Chelmsford City	Released	(Note: Shaun Batt joined Chelmsford City following his release.)
1 July 2017	DM	(England)	Tom Champion	Boreham Wood	Released	(Note: Tom Champion joined Boreham Wood following his release.)
1 July 2017	CB	(France)	Bira Dembélé	Laval	Released	(Note: Bira Dembélé joined Laval following his release.)
1 July 2017	CF	(England)	Michael Gash	King's Lynn Town	Released	(Note: Michael Gash joined King's Lynn Town following his release.)
1 July 2017	RB	(England)	James Pearson	Coventry City	Released	(Note: James Pearson joined Coventry City following his release.)
13 July 2017	LW	(England)	Luke Coulson	Ebbsfleet United	Undisclosed	
31 January 2018	LW	(Jamaica)	Jamal Campbell-Ryce	Carlisle United	Nominal	
20 March 2018	DF	(Guyana)	Matthew Briggs	Free agent	Released	
20 March 2018	CF	(England)	Jordan Brown	Free agent	Released	

=== Loans in ===
Start date	Position	Nationality	Name	From	End date	Ref.
31 January 2018	GK	(England)	George Legg	Reading	30 June 2018	
31 January 2018	DF	(Croatia)	Tin Plavotic	Bristol City	20 March 2018	

=== Loans out ===
Start date	Position	Nationality	Name	To	End date	Ref.
11 August 2017	GK	(Guyana)	Kai McKenzie-Lyle	St Ives Town	8 September 2017	
7 September 2017	FW	(England)	Justin Amaluzor	Hemel Hempstead Town	5 October 2017	
22 September 2017	LB	(England)	Joe Payne	Solihull Moors	21 October 2017	
30 September 2017	RB	(England)	Tom Day	Hemel Hempstead Town	28 October 2017	
13 October 2017	CM	(England)	Dan Sweeney	Hampton & Richmond Borough	10 November 2017	
6 November 2017	RB	(England)	Tom Day	Hemel Hempstead Town	30 June 2018	
13 November 2017	CB	(England)	Darnell Smith	Hungerford Town	11 December 2017	
23 December 2017	GK	(Guyana)	Kai McKenzie-Lyle	Hayes & Yeading United	20 January 2018	
23 December 2017	FW	(England)	Justin Amaluzor	Hampton & Richmond Borough	20 January 2018	
19 January 2018	GK	(England)	Renell McKenzie-Lyle	Hayes & Yeading United	16 February 2018	
22 March 2018	FW	(England)	Justin Amaluzor	Bognor Regis Town	End of season	
22 March 2018	FW	(Romania)	Shane Cojocarel	Horsham	End of season	
22 March 2018	FW	(England)	Malakai Mars	Farnborough	End of season	
22 March 2018	MF	(England)	Jordan Nicholson	Brackley Town	End of season	

== Competitions ==
=== Friendlies ===
As of 14 July 2017, Barnet have announced six pre-season friendlies against Swansea City, Braintree Town, West Ham United Under-23s, Maidstone United, Millwall and Concord Rangers.

8 July 2017	Maidstone United	0–5	Barnet	Maidstone
15:00 BST		Report	Shomotun 6'; Amaluzor 11'; Nicholls 31'; Watson 76'; Akpa Akpro 81'	Stadium: Gallagher Stadium

12 July 2017	Barnet	1–0	Swansea City	Canons Park
19:45 BST	Akinde 40'	Report		Stadium: The Hive Stadium; Attendance: 1,392

15 July 2017	Barnet	2–1	West Ham United Under-23s	Canons Park
15:00 BST	Akpa Akpro 39'; Akinde 60'	Report	Hannam 72'	Stadium: The Hive Stadium; Attendance: 811

22 July 2017	Barnet	1–0	Millwall	Canons Park
15:00 BST	Akinde 19'	Report		Stadium: The Hive Stadium

25 July 2017	Braintree Town	1–3	Barnet	Braintree
19:45 BST	Wyatt 90'	Report	Kyei 19'; Trialist 39'; Vilhete 49'	Stadium: Cressing Road

29 July 2017	Barnet	1–3	Concord Rangers	Canons Park
15:00 BST	Amaluzor 85'	Report	Cox 12'; Taaffe 73'; Farrell 89'	Stadium: The Hive Stadium

31 July 2017	Boreham Wood	4–1	Barnet XI	Borehamwood
19:45 BST	Jeffers 37' 55' (pen.); Balanta 79'; Murtagh 90'	Report	Kyei 56'	Stadium: Meadow Park

=== League Two ===
==== League table ====
Pos	Team	Pld	W	D	L	GF	GA	GD	Pts	Promotion, qualification or relegation
20	Port Vale	46	11	14	21	49	67	−18	47	
21	Forest Green Rovers	46	13	8	25	54	77	−23	47	
22	Morecambe	46	9	19	18	41	56	−15	46	
23	Barnet (R)	46	12	10	24	46	65	−19	46	Relegation to the National League
24	Chesterfield (R)	46	10	8	28	47	83	−36	38	Relegation to the National League

Source: BBC Sport
Rules for classification: 1) Points; 2) Goal difference; 3) Number of goals scored
(R) Relegated

==== Result summary ====
Overall								Home						Away					
Pld	W	D	L	GF	GA	GD	Pts	W	D	L	GF	GA	GD	W	D	L	GF	GA	GD
46	12	10	24	46	65	−19	46	8	6	9	24	25	−1	4	4	15	22	40	−18

Last updated: 8 May 2018.

==== Results by matchday ====
Matchday	1	2	3	4	5	6	7	8	9	10	11	12	13	14	15	16	17	18	19	20	21	22	23	24	25	26	27	28	29	30	31	32	33	34	35	36	37	38	39	40	41	42	43	44	45	46
Ground	A	H	A	H	A	H	H	A	H	A	A	H	A	H	H	A	H	A	A	H	A	H	H	A	A	H	A	H	A	A	H	A	H	H	A	A	H	H	A	H	A	H	A	H	A	H
Result	D	W	L	L	W	W	L	D	L	L	L	D	L	D	D	L	L	L	W	L	L	W	L	L	L	L	L	D	D	L	W	L	D	L	W	L	D	L	L	W	L	W	D	W	W	W
Position	11	4	12	17	14	7	12	14	14	15	18	19	21	20	20	21	23	23	23	23	24	24	24	24	24	24	24	24	24	24	24	24	24	24	24	24	24	24	24	24	24	23	23	23	23	23

Source: Statto.com
A = Away; H = Home; W = Win; D = Draw; L = Loss

==== Matches ====
On 21 June 2017, the league fixtures were announced.

5 August 2017 1	Forest Green Rovers	2–2	Barnet	Nailsworth
15:00 BST	Doidge 41', 43'	Report	Akpa Akpro 58'; Taylor (yellow card) 59' (yellow-red card) 90+5'; Campbell-Ryce 63'	Stadium: The New Lawn; Attendance: 3,171; Referee: Darren Drysdale

12 August 2017 2	Barnet	1–0	Luton Town	Canons Park
15:00 BST	J. Taylor (yellow card) 53', (goal) 90+1'; Campbell-Ryce (yellow card) 81'	Report	Rea (yellow card) 83'	Stadium: The Hive Stadium; Attendance: 3,555; Referee: Kevin Johnson

19 August 2017 3	Crewe Alexandra	1–0	Barnet	Crewe
15:00 BST	Pickering (yellow card) 57'; Porter 75'	Report	Taylor (yellow card) 77'; Tutonda (yellow card) 87'	Stadium: Gresty Road; Attendance: 3,217; Referee: Anthony Backhouse

26 August 2017 4	Barnet	0–1	Stevenage	Canons Park
15:00 BST		Report	Pett 27' (yellow card) 64'; Gorman (red card) 35'	Stadium: The Hive Stadium; Attendance: 1,883; Referee: Richard Clark

2 September 2017 5	Swindon Town	1–4	Barnet	Swindon
15:00 BST	Norris (yellow card) 12' (goal) 78'; McDermott (red card) 50'	Report	Coulthirst 10', 65', 69'; Campbell-Ryce 16' (pen.); Blackman (red card) 80'	Stadium: County Ground; Attendance: 5,895; Referee: James Linington

9 September 2017 6	Barnet	3–1	Cambridge United	Canons Park
15:00 BST	Vilhete 40', 90+5'; Taylor (yellow card) 57'; Coulthirst 62'	Report	Legge 71'; Halliday (yellow card) 90+7'	Stadium: The Hive Stadium; Attendance: 2,031; Referee: Anthony Coggins

12 September 2017 7	Barnet	1–2	Exeter City	Canons Park
20:00 BST	Coulthirst 48'; Ross (yellow card) 90+5'	Report	Reid 78'; Tillson (yellow card) 80'; Boateng (yellow card) 89'; Stockley 90+4'	Stadium: The Hive Stadium; Attendance: 1,605; Referee: Graham Horwood

16 September 2017 8	Carlisle United	1–1	Barnet	Carlisle
15:00 BST	Miller 85'	Report	Akpa Akpro 8'	Stadium: Brunton Park; Attendance: 4,141; Referee: Scott Oldham

23 September 2017 9	Barnet	1–2	Crawley Town	Canons Park
15:00 BST	Akinola 65'; Tutonda (yellow card) 79'	Report	Lelan (yellow card) 28'; Smith 63', 89'; Connolly (yellow card) 68'	Stadium: The Hive Stadium; Attendance: 1,602; Referee: Darren Handley

26 September 2017 10	Lincoln City	2–1	Barnet	Lincoln
19:45 BST	Palmer 7'; Anderson 42'; Dickie (yellow card) 88'	Report	Coulthirst 62'; Vilhete (yellow card) 88'	Stadium: Sincil Bank; Attendance: 7,320; Referee: Trevor Kettle

30 September 2017 11	Wycombe Wanderers	3–1	Barnet	High Wycombe
15:00 BST	Akinfenwa 23'; Umerah 65'; Freeman 76'	Report	Vilhete 78'; Campbell-Ryce (yellow card) 82'	Stadium: Adams Park; Attendance: 4,056; Referee: Ross Joyce

7 October 2017 12	Barnet	0–0	Coventry City	Canons Park
12:30 BST		Report	McDonald (yellow card) 90'	Stadium: The Hive Stadium; Attendance: Ben Toner; Referee: 4,041

14 October 2017 13	Notts County	2–1	Barnet	Nottingham
15:00 BST	Ameobi 16'; Yates 52'; Dickinson (yellow card) 66'	Report	Ricardo (yellow card) 48'; Akinola 81'; Nelson (yellow card) 84'	Stadium: Meadow Lane; Attendance: 5,804; Referee: Michael Salisbury

17 October 2017 14	Barnet	1–1	Mansfield Town	Canons Park
20:00 BST	Akinola (yellow card) 45+1'; Coulthirst 85'	Report	Benning (yellow card) 36'; Butcher 45+2'; Mirfin (yellow card) 51'; Digby (yellow card) 55'	Stadium: The Hive Stadium; Attendance: 1,262; Referee: Craig Hicks

21 October 2017 15	Barnet	1–1	Yeovil Town	Canons Park
15:00 BST	Akinola 6'; Tutonda (yellow card) 82'; Akpa Akpro (yellow card) 90+4'	Report	Sowunmi (yellow card) 52'; James (yellow card) 60'; Khan 81' (yellow card) 85'	Stadium: The Hive Stadium; Attendance: 1,751; Referee: Andy Woolmer

28 October 2017 16	Accrington Stanley	4–1	Barnet	Accrington
15:00 BST	McConville 35'; Clark 51'; Kee 59'; Jackson 65'	Report	Nelson (yellow card) 32'; Campbell-Ryce 54'	Stadium: Crown Ground; Attendance: 1,485; Referee: Mark Heywood

11 November 2017 17	Barnet	0–1	Colchester United	Canons Park
15:00 GMT		Report	Loft (yellow card) 63'; Comley (yellow card) 68'; Szmodics 83'	Stadium: The Hive Stadium; Attendance: 2,301; Referee: John Brooks

18 November 2017 18	Port Vale	1–0	Barnet	Burslem
15:00 GMT	Pope (yellow card) 73' (goal) 80' (pen.); Kay (yellow card) 88'	Report	Blackman (yellow card) 21'	Stadium: Vale Park; Attendance: 4,207; Referee: Anthony Backhouse

21 November 2017 19	Newport County	1–2	Barnet	Newport
19:45 GMT	Amond (yellow card) 45'; Butler (yellow card) 54'; O'Brien (yellow card) 70'; White 73'; Nouble (yellow card) 86'	Report	Ricardo (yellow card) 44'; Akinde 88'; Coulthirst 90'	Stadium: Rodney Parade; Attendance: 2,275; Referee: Michael Salisbury

25 November 2017 20	Barnet	0–2	Grimsby Town	Canons Park
15:00 GMT	Pascal (red card) 54'	Report	Matt 6'; Jones (yellow card) 59' (goal) 75'	Stadium: The Hive Stadium; Attendance: 2,033; Referee: Gavin Ward

9 December 2017 21	Chesterfield	2–1	Barnet	Chesterfield
15:00 GMT	Weir (yellow card) 36' (goal) 90+3'; Reed (yellow card) 55'; Dennis (yellow card) 55'; Clough 66' (o.g.); Evatt (yellow card) 77'	Report	Akinde 11'; Fonguck (yellow card) 63'	Stadium: Proact Stadium; Attendance: 5,272; Referee: John Busby

16 December 2017 22	Barnet	2–1	Morecambe	London
15:00 GMT	Campbell-Ryce 30'; Taylor 34'; Coulthirst (yellow card) 62'	Report	Müller (yellow card) 45+1'; Campbell 72'	Stadium: The Hive Stadium; Attendance: 1,123; Referee: (England) Dean Whitestone

23 December 2017 23	Barnet	0–2	Cheltenham Town	London
15:00 GMT	Watson (yellow card) 54'; Nelson (yellow card) 59'; Taylor (yellow card) 68'	Report	Dawson 32'; Winchester 38'; Pell (yellow card) 75'; Moore (yellow card) 81'	Stadium: The Hive Stadium; Attendance: 1,487; Referee: (England) Trevor Kettle

26 December 2017 24	Cambridge United	1–0	Barnet	Cambridge
15:00 GMT	Maris 62'	Report	Brindley (yellow card) 41'; Blackman (yellow card) 53'; Akinde (yellow card) 77'; Taylor (yellow card) 87'	Stadium: Cambs Glass Stadium; Attendance: 4,639; Referee: (England) Graham Salisbury

30 December 2017 25	Exeter City	2–1	Barnet	Exeter
15:00 GMT	Wilson 30'; Moxey (yellow card) 79'; Taylor 90+1'	Report	Watson 69'	Stadium: St James Park; Attendance: 3,869; Referee: (England) Kevin Johnson

1 January 2018 26	Barnet	1–2	Swindon Town	Canons Park
15:00 GMT	Akinde 20'; Nelson (yellow card) 45+2'; Tutonda (yellow card) 84'; Campbell-Ryce (yellow card) 89'	Report	Iandolo 17'; Preston 45+2'; Gordon (yellow card) 77'	Stadium: The Hive Stadium; Attendance: 2,038; Referee: (England) Craig Hicks

13 January 2018 27	Crawley Town	2–0	Barnet	Crawley
15:00 GMT	Connolly (yellow card) 11'; Randall (yellow card) 15'; Boldewijn 75' 86'	Report	Clough (yellow card) 37'; Coulthirst (yellow card) 54'	Stadium: Checkatrade.com Stadium; Attendance: 1,874; Referee: (England) Nick Kinseley

20 January 2018 28	Barnet	1–1	Lincoln City	London
15:00 GMT	Akinde 12'; Weston (yellow card) 71'; Amaluzor (yellow card) 90+1'	Report	Rhead (yellow card) 45'; Wilson 47'	Stadium: The Hive Stadium; Attendance: 3,161; Referee: (England) Tom Nield

27 January 2018 29	Cheltenham Town	1–1	Barnet	Cheltenham
15:00 GMT	Eisa 65'; Pell (yellow card) 71'	Report	Ricardo 5'; Ross (yellow card) 55'; Tutonda (yellow card) 60'; Sweeney (yellow card) 80'	Stadium: LCI Rail Stadium; Attendance: 2,609; Referee: (England) Lee Swabey

3 February 2018 30	Mansfield Town	3–1	Barnet	Mansfield
15:00 GMT	MacDonald 42'; Atkinson 55'; Rose 70'	Report	Akinola 87'	Stadium: One Call Stadium; Attendance: 3,795; Referee: (England) Scott Oldham

10 February 2018 31	Barnet	1–0	Notts County	Canons Park
15:00 GMT	Nicholls 90+3'	Report	Duffy (yellow card) 15'; Husin (yellow card) 62'; Noble (yellow card) 74'	Stadium: The Hive Stadium; Attendance: 1,752; Referee: John Busby

13 February 2018 32	Yeovil Town	2–0	Barnet	Yeovil
19:45 GMT	Surridge 2' (pen.); Zoko (yellow card) 65', (goal) 90+3'	Report	Brindley (yellow card) 49'	Stadium: Huish Park; Attendance: 2,455; Referee: James Linington

17 February 2018 33	Barnet	1–1	Accrington Stanley	Canons Park
15:00 GMT	Nicholls 18'; Watson (yellow card) 53'; Sweeney (yellow card) 53'; Santos (yellow card) 68'; Akinola (yellow card) 85'	Report	Sousa (yellow card) 61'; Kee 68' (pen.)	Stadium: The Hive Stadium; Attendance: 1,501; Referee: Brett Huxtable

20 February 2018 34	Barnet	1–3	Carlisle United	Canons Park
20:00 GMT	Almeida Santos 50'; Watson (yellow card) 86'	Report	Nadesan 70', 87'; Bennett 82', (yellow card) 90+1'	Stadium: The Hive Stadium; Attendance: 1,151; Referee: Chris Sarginson

24 February 2018 35	Colchester United	0–1	Barnet	Colchester
15:00	Mandron (yellow card) 77'	Report	Sweeney (yellow card) 45'; Bover (yellow card) 63'; Nicholls 66'	Stadium: Weston Homes Community Stadium; Attendance: 3,121; Referee: Dean Whitestone

10 March 2018 36	Coventry City	1–0	Barnet	Coventry
15:00 GMT	Clarke-Harris 75', (yellow card) 76'	Report	Weston (yellow card) 26'	Stadium: Ricoh Arena; Attendance: 7,127; Referee: Gavin Ward

13 March 2018 37	Barnet	1–1	Port Vale	Canons Park
20:00 GMT	Nicholls 4'	Report	Forrester 51'	Stadium: The Hive Stadium; Attendance: 1,153; Referee: Brendan Malone

17 March 2018 38	Barnet	0–2	Wycombe Wanderers	Canons Park
15:00 GMT	Weston (yellow card) 46'; Taylor (yellow card) 90'	Report	Jacobson 52'; Santos (o.g.)	Stadium: The Hive Stadium; Attendance: 2,103; Referee: Lee Collins

24 March 2018 39	Luton Town	2–0	Barnet	Luton
17:15 GMT	Hylton 47'; Collins 67'	Report	Brindley (yellow card) 62'; Akinde (yellow card) 76'; Tutonda (yellow card) 79'	Stadium: Kenilworth Road; Attendance: 8,140; Referee: Michael Salisbury

30 March 2018 40	Barnet	2–1	Crewe Alexandra	Canons Park
15:00 GMT	Akinde 51' (pen.), 87' (pen.); Weston (yellow card) 90+5'	Report	McKirdy 70'	Stadium: The Hive Stadium; Attendance: 1,951; Referee: Lee Swabey

2 April 2018 41	Stevenage	4–1	Barnet	Stevenage
15:00 GMT	Newton 44', 62'; Revell 67', 87'	Report	Coulthirst 82'	Stadium: Broadhall Way; Attendance: 3,350; Referee: Antony Coggins

7 April 2018 42	Barnet	1–0	Forest Green Rovers	Canons Park
15:00 GMT	Nicholls 45+3', (yellow card) 48'; Akinde (yellow card) 50'; Payne (yellow card) 86'	Report	Osbourne (yellow card) 60'; Bennett (yellow card) 64'; Rawson (yellow card) 83'; Clements (yellow card) 84'	Stadium: The Hive Stadium; Attendance: 1,764; Referee: Nick Kinseley

14 April 2018 43	Grimsby Town	2–2	Barnet	Grimsby
15:00 GMT	Collins 6'; Clarke (yellow card) 45+2'; Rose 82' (pen.); McSheffrey (yellow card) 90+5'	Report	Weston (yellow card) 16', (goal) 79'; Nelson (yellow card) 42'; Akpa Akpro 62'; Coulthirst (yellow card) 71'; Clough (yellow card) 84'; Sweeney (yellow card) 90+5'	Stadium: Blundell Park; Attendance: 5,416; Referee: Darren Bond

21 April 2018 44	Barnet	2–0	Newport County	Canons Park
15:00 GMT	Coulthirst 10'; Akpa Akpro (yellow card) 82'; Santos 82'	Report	Tozer (yellow card) 24'; Demetriou (yellow card) 43'	Stadium: The Hive Stadium; Attendance: 1,816; Referee: Rob Lewis

28 April 2018 45	Morecambe	0–1	Barnet	Morecambe
15:00 GMT	Oliver (yellow card) 77'	Report	Brindley (yellow card) 38'; Nicholls 79'	Stadium: Globe Arena; Attendance: 2,073; Referee: Geoff Eltringham

5 May 2018 46	Barnet	3–0	Chesterfield	Canons Park
15:00 GMT	Akinde 42'; Brindley 81'; Nicholls 88'	Report		Stadium: The Hive Stadium; Attendance: 5,539; Referee: Dean Whitestone

=== FA Cup ===
On 16 October 2017, Barnet were drawn away to Blackburn Rovers in the first round.

4 November 2017 First round	Blackburn Rovers	3–1	Barnet	Blackburn
15:00 GMT	Evans (yellow card) 60'; Nuttall 63'; Graham 70'; Antonsson 81'	Report	Akinola 31'	Stadium: Ewood Park; Attendance: 3,710; Referee: Carl Boyeson

=== EFL Cup ===
On 16 June 2017, Barnet were drawn away to Peterborough United in the first round. Another away tie against Brighton & Hove Albion was confirmed for the second round.

8 August 2017 First round	Peterborough United	1–3	Barnet	Peterborough
19:45 BST	Edwards 30'	Report	Akpa Akpro 22'; Vilhete 39'; Coulthirst 58'	Stadium: ABAX Stadium; Attendance: 2,725; Referee: Tony Harrington

22 August 2017 Second round	Brighton & Hove Albion	1–0	Barnet	Falmer
19:45 BST	Knockaert (yellow card) 45+2'; Tilley 53'	Report		Stadium: Falmer Stadium; Attendance: 11,414; Referee: Steve Martin

=== EFL Trophy ===
On 12 July 2017, the group stage draw was made with Barnet facing AFC Wimbledon, Luton Town and Tottenham Hotspur U23s in Southern Group F.

Pos	Lge	Team	Pld	W	PW	PL	L	GF	GA	GD	Pts	Qualification
1	L2	Luton Town (Q)	3	1	2	0	0	5	4	+1	7	Round 2
2	L1	AFC Wimbledon (Q)	3	2	0	0	1	9	8	+1	6	Round 2
3	L2	Barnet (E)	3	1	0	1	1	6	6	0	4	
4	ACA	Tottenham Hotspur U21 (E)	3	0	0	1	2	6	8	−2	1	

Updated to match(es) played on 3 October 2017. Source: EFL.com
(E) Eliminated; (Q) Qualified to the phase indicated

29 August 2017 Group Game 1	Barnet	3–4	AFC Wimbledon	Canons Park
20:00 BST	Bover 13'; Coulthirst 25'; Blackman 89'	Report	Hartigan 5'; Kaja 16'; McDonald 48'; Clough 56' (o.g.)	Stadium: The Hive Stadium; Attendance: 696

3 October 2017 Group Game 2	Luton Town	1–1 (4–3 p)	Barnet	Luton
19:45 BST	Cook (yellow card) 57'; Shea (yellow card) 62'; Lee 64'	Report	Bover (yellow card) 32'; Tusonda (yellow card) 54'; Taylor 63' (pen.)	Stadium: Kenilworth Road; Attendance: 1,530; Referee: John Busby
	Penalties
	Lee (penalty scored); Berry (penalty missed); Cook (penalty scored); Justin (penalty scored); Ruddock (penalty scored)		Taylor (penalty scored); Tutonda (penalty missed); Fonguck (penalty scored); Shomotun (penalty scored); Ricardo (penalty missed)

28 November 2017 Group Game 3	Barnet	2–1	Tottenham Hotspur U21s	Canons Park
20:00 GMT	Maghoma 48' (o.g.); Nicholls 57'	Report	Harrison 16'	Stadium: The Hive Stadium; Attendance: 445

== Squad information ==
=== Appearances ===
Correct as of 5 May 2018

No.	Nat.	Player	Pos.	League Two	FA Cup	EFL Cup	EFL Trophy	Total
1	(England)	Jamie Stephens	GK	11	0	1	0	12
2	(England)	Richard Brindley	DF	17 (1)	0	0	0	17 (1)
3	(England)	Elliott Johnson	DF	2	0	1	0	3
4	(England)	Charlie Clough	DF	29 (7)	1	1 (1)	2	33 (8)
5	(Portugal)	Ricardo Almeida Santos	DF	42	1	2	2	47
6	(England)	Michael Nelson	DF	25 (2)	0	1	1	27 (2)
7	(England)	Ryan Watson	MF	25 (3)	1	0	1	27 (3)
8	(England)	Curtis Weston	MF	22	0	0	0	22
9	(England)	John Akinde	FW	30 (2)	0	0	0	30 (2)
11	(England)	Shaq Coulthirst	MF	34 (6)	0	2	2	38 (6)
12	(England)	Jack Taylor	MF	27 (10)	1	1	2	32 (10)
13	(Democratic Republic of the Congo)	David Tutonda	DF	35 (6)	1	2	2 (1)	40 (7)
14	(Nigeria)	Simeon Akinola	FW	10 (19)	1	0 (1)	1	12 (20)
15	(Spain)	Ruben Bover	MF	8 (5)	0 (1)	0 (2)	2	10 (8)
16	(England)	Harry Taylor	DF	14 (2)	0	2	1 (1)	17 (3)
17	(England)	Nana Kyei	MF	2 (1)	0	0	1 (1)	3 (2)
18	(England)	Wesley Fonguck	MF	10 (9)	1	2	3	16 (9)
19	(Nigeria)	Fumnaya Shomotun	MF	2 (4)	0	0	0 (1)	2 (5)
20	(Portugal)	Mauro Vilhete	MF	27 (5)	1	2	2	32 (5)
21	(England)	Craig Ross	GK	32 (1)	1	1	3	37 (1)
22	(Romania)	Shane Cojocarel	FW	0	0	0	0	0
23	(England)	Alex Nicholls	FW	19 (6)	1	0	1	21 (6)
24	(England)	Andre Blackman	DF	15 (4)	0	0	3	18 (4)
25	(France)	Jean-Louis Akpa Akpro	FW	14 (12)	1	2	0 (1)	17 (13)
26	(England)	Dan Sweeney	MF	20 (1)	0	0	0	20 (1)
27	(England)	Ephron Mason-Clark	FW	0 (8)	0	0	1	1 (8)
28	(England)	Darnell Smith	DF	0	0	0	1	1
29	(England)	Tom Day	DF	0	0	0	0	0
30	(England)	Justin Amaluzor	FW	0 (4)	0	0 (2)	0 (2)	0 (8)
31	(Guyana)	Kai McKenzie-Lyle	GK	0	0	0	0	0
32	(England)	Joe Payne	DF	1 (2)	0	0	0	1 (2)
33	(England)	Tobi Coker	MF	0	0	0	0 (1)	0 (1)
34	(England)	Renell McKenzie-Lyle	GK	0	0	0	0	0
35	(England)	Malakai Mars	FW	0 (1)	0	0	1	1 (1)
36	(England)	Dave Tarpey	FW	2	0	0	0	2
37	(England)	Benjy Aghadiuno	FW	1	0 (1)	0	0 (1)	1 (2)
38	(England)	Dwight Pascal	DF	1	0	0	1	2
39	(Nigeria)	Fuad Sule	MF	0 (1)	0	0	0	0 (1)
40	(England)	George Legg	GK	3	0	0	0	3
41	(England)	Jordan Nicholson	MF	3 (5)	0	0	0	3 (5)
Left before the end of the season
10	(Jamaica)	Jamal Campbell-Ryce	MF	23 (1)	0	2	0	25 (1)
24	(England)	Luke Coulson	MF	0	0	0	0	0
42	(Croatia)	Tin Plavotic	DF	0 (1)	0	0	0	0 (1)
43	(Guyana)	Matthew Briggs	DF	0 (1)	0	0	0	0 (1)

=== Goalscorers ===
Correct as of 5 May 2018

No.	Nat.	Player	Pos.	League Two	FA Cup	EFL Cup	EFL Trophy	Total
1	(England)	Shaq Coulthirst	FW	10	0	1	1	12
2	(England)	Alex Nicholls	FW	7	0	0	1	8
3	(England)	John Akinde	FW	7	0	0	0	7
4=	(Nigeria)	Simeon Akinola	FW	4	1	0	0	5
4=	(France)	Jean-Louis Akpa Akpro	FW	4	0	1	0	5
6=	(Jamaica)	Jamal Campbell-Ryce	MF	4	0	0	0	4
6=	(Portugal)	Mauro Vilhete	MF	3	0	1	0	4
8=	(Portugal)	Ricardo Almeida Santos	DF	3	0	0	0	3
8=	(England)	Jack Taylor	MF	2	0	0	1	3
10	(England)	Curtis Weston	MF	2	0	0	0	2
11=	(England)	Ryan Watson	MF	1	0	0	0	1
11=	(England)	Richard Brindley	DF	1	0	0	0	1
11=	(Spain)	Ruben Bover	MF	0	0	0	1	1
11=	(England)	Andre Blackman	DF	0	0	0	1	1
11=		Own goals		0	0	0	1	1
Totals				47	1	3	6	57
