= Kai McKenzie-Lyle =

Footballer (born 1997)

Personal information
- Full name: Kai John Oliver Milton McKenzie-Lyle
- Date of birth: 30 November 1997 (age 28)
- Place of birth: Haringey, England
- Height: 6 ft 6 in (1.98 m)
- Position: Goalkeeper

Youth career
- 2007–2011: Tottenham Hotspur
- 2011–2014: Barnet

Senior career*
Years	Team	Apps	(Gls)
2014–2018	Barnet	1	(0)
2016	→ Cockfosters (loan)	8	(0)
2017	→ St Ives Town (loan)	6	(0)
2017–2018	→ Hayes & Yeading United (loan)	7	(0)
2018–2020	Liverpool	0	(0)
2020–2022	Cambridge United	1	(0)
2022	→ Chelmsford City (loan)	9	(0)
2022–2023	Welling United	16	(0)
2024	Folkestone Invicta	13	(0)
2024–2025	Oxford City	27	(0)
2025	Welling United	3	(0)
2025–2026	Dagenham & Redbridge	6	(0)
2026	Ferizaj	12	(0)

International career^{‡}
2016–	Guyana	14	(1)
- * Club domestic league appearances and goals as of 22:30, 18 October 2026 (UTC) ‡ National team caps and goals as of 11:50, 1 December 2025 (UTC)

Kai John Oliver Milton McKenzie-Lyle (born 30 November 1997) is a professional footballer who last played as a goalkeeper for Kosovo Superleague club Ferizaj. Born in England, he represents Guyana at international level.

== Club career ==
=== Barnet ===
McKenzie-Lyle joined Tottenham Hotspur as under-10, before he moved to Barnet as an under-14 and progressed through the club's academy to become first choice keeper for the under-18s, and made his senior debut with a start in a 3–0 Herts Senior Cup defeat to Bishop's Stortford on 21 January 2014. He first appeared on the bench in the league in October 2014. He made his English Football League debut on 12 September 2015 in a 3–1 League Two away defeat by Portsmouth, coming on as a substitute for John Akinde after regular goalkeeper Jamie Stephens had been sent-off. McKenzie-Lyle joined St Ives Town in August 2017 on loan. He then joined Hayes & Yeading United on loan in December 2017.

=== Liverpool ===
McKenzie-Lyle joined Liverpool on trial in July 2018. He then signed for the Reds the following month. McKenzie-Lyle was released in June 2020, having played just twice for the under-23s in Premier League 2.

=== Cambridge United ===
On 1 September 2020, McKenzie-Lyle joined League Two club Cambridge United on a two-year deal. On 25 March 2022, Chelmsford City announced the signing of McKenzie-Lyle on loan.

McKenzie-Lyle was released by the club at the end of the 2021–22 season.

=== Non-league ===
McKenzie-Lyle joined Welling United in August 2022.

On 6 February 2024, Mckenzie-Lyle joined Isthmian League Premier Division club Folkestone Invicta.

McKenzie-Lyle joined Oxford City for the 2024–25 season.

On 30 September 2025, McKenzie-Lyle returned to Welling United, now of the Isthmian League Premier Division. He departed the club one month later having made three appearances. In November 2025, he joined National League South club Dagenham & Redbridge on non-contract terms.

In February 2026, McKenzie-Lyle signed for Kosovo Superleague club Ferizaj.

== International career ==
McKenzie-Lyle was called up to Guyana's squad for their third round matches of 2017 Caribbean Cup qualification, after being alerted to his eligibility by Jack Thorpe, a researcher for the Football Manager game. He made an unusual international debut for a goalkeeper, scoring a header in the 120th minute of a 3–2 loss against Suriname. On his second appearance he saved a penalty against Jamaica.

== Personal life ==
McKenzie-Lyle's younger brother Renell (born 2000) is also a goalkeeper and product of the youth system at Barnet.

== Career statistics ==
=== Club ===
As of 31 October 2025

Appearances and goals by club, season and competition
Club	Season	League			FA Cup		League Cup		Other		Total	
Club	Season	Division	Apps	Goals	Apps	Goals	Apps	Goals	Apps	Goals	Apps	Goals
Barnet	2013–14	Conference Premier	0	0	0	0	―		1 (Note: Appearance in Herts Senior Cup)	0	1	0
Barnet	2014–15	Conference Premier	0	0	0	0	―		1	0	1	0
Barnet	2015–16	League Two	1	0	0	0	0	0	0	0	1	0
Barnet	2016–17	League Two	0	0	0	0	0	0	1 (Note: Appearance in Middlesex Senior Cup)	0	1	0
Barnet	2017–18	League Two	0	0	0	0	0	0	1	0	1	0
Barnet	Total		1	0	0	0	0	0	4	0	5	0
Cockfosters (loan)	2015–16	Spartan South Midlands League Premier Division	8	0	―		―		0	0	8	0
St Ives Town (loan)	2017–18	Southern League Premier Division	6	0	0	0	―		―		6	0
Hayes & Yeading United (loan)	2017–18	Southern League First Division East	7	0	―		―		1 (Note: Appearance in Southern League Challenge Cup)	0	8	0
Liverpool	2018–19	Premier League	0	0	0	0	0	0	0	0	0	0
Liverpool	2019–20	Premier League	0	0	0	0	0	0	0	0	0	0
Liverpool	Total		0	0	0	0	0	0	0	0	0	0
Cambridge United	2020–21	League Two	0	0	0	0	0	0	0	0	0	0
Cambridge United	2021–22	League One	1	0	0	0	0	0	4 (Note: Appearance in the EFL Trophy)	0	5	0
Cambridge United	Total		1	0	0	0	0	0	4	0	5	0
Chelmsford City (loan)	2021–22	National League South	9	0	0	0	—		0	0	9	0
Welling United	2022–23	National League South	16	0	3	0	—		6 (Note: Two appearances in the FA Trophy, three appearances in the Kent Senior Cup, one appearance in the London Senior Cup)	0	25	0
Folkestone Invicta	2023–24	Isthmian League Premier Division	13	0	0	0	—		0	0	13	0
Oxford City	2024–25	National League North	27	0	0	0	—		4 (Note: Appearance(s) in FA Trophy)	0	31	0
Welling United	2025–26	Isthmian League Premier Division	3	0	0	0	—		0	0	3	0
Career total			91	0	3	0	0	0	21	0	125	0

=== International ===
As of match played 25 March 2025

Appearances and goals by national team and year
National team	Year	Apps	Goals
Guyana	2016	2	1
Guyana	2018	3	0
Guyana	2021	4	0
Guyana	2023	4	0
Guyana	2025	1	0
Total		14	1

Scores and results list Guyana's goal tally first, score column indicates score after each McKenzie-Lyle goal.

No.	Date	Venue	Opponent	Score	Result	Competition	Ref.
1	8 October 2016	André Kamperveen Stadion, Paramaribo, Suriname	Suriname	2–3	2–3	2017 Caribbean Cup qualification	
