= Harry Taylor (footballer, born 1997) =

English footballer

Personal information
- Full name: Harry William Taylor
- Date of birth: 4 May 1997 (age 29)
- Place of birth: Hammersmith, England
- Height: 6 ft 2 in (1.88 m)
- Positions: Centre-back; defensive midfielder

Team information
- Current team: Hornchurch (on loan from Southend United)
- Number: 31

Youth career
- 2005–2012: Chelsea
- 2012–2015: Barnet

Senior career*
Years	Team	Apps	(Gls)
2014–2022	Barnet	171	(1)
2015	→ Hampton & Richmond Borough (loan)	15	(1)
2016	→ Staines Town (loan)	6	(0)
2018–2019	→ Woking (loan)	6	(0)
2022–	Southend United	160	(0)
2026–	→ Hornchurch (loan)	0	(0)
- * Club domestic league appearances and goals as of 13:20, 8 November 2026 (UTC)

Harry William Taylor (born 4 May 1997) is an English professional footballer who plays as a center back or defensive midfielder for National League club Hornchurch on loan from National League club Southend United.

== Career ==
Taylor was in the youth team at Chelsea for seven years, before joining Barnet as an under-15. He made his senior debut with a start in a 3–0 Herts Senior Cup defeat to Bishop's Stortford on 21 January 2014. He returned to the first team on 13 December 2014, starting an FA Trophy tie away to Concord Rangers. He won Barnet's Youth Player of the Year award for the 2014–15 season. Taylor joined Hampton & Richmond Borough on loan in September 2015. After returning to Barnet following a three-month loan spell, he made his debut in the Football League as a late substitute for Curtis Weston at home to Newport County on 26 December 2015. He then joined Staines Town on loan on 18 February 2016, alongside team-mate Ryan Gondoh. On 21 December 2018, Taylor agreed to reunite with former manager, Alan Dowson at Woking on a one-month loan deal. Taylor left Barnet at the end of the 2021-22 season. He made 229 appearances for the Bees, scoring one goal.

Taylor signed for Southend United on 28 June 2022, on a two-year deal with a one-year option.

== Personal life ==
Born in England, Taylor is of Irish descent. His younger brother Jack (born 1998) was also in the youth team at Chelsea and later a professional at Barnet, Peterborough and Ipswich.

== Career statistics ==
As of match played 7 November 2026

Appearances and goals by club, season and competition
Club	Season	League			FA Cup		League Cup		Other		Total	
Club	Season	Division	Apps	Goals	Apps	Goals	Apps	Goals	Apps	Goals	Apps	Goals
Barnet	2013–14	Conference Premier	0	0	0	0	—		1 (Note: Appearance(s) in Herts Senior Cup)	0	1	0
Barnet	2014–15	Conference Premier	0	0	0	0	—		3 (Note: Two appearances in FA Trophy, one appearance in Herts Senior Cup)	0	3	0
Barnet	2015–16	League Two	8	0	0	0	0	0	0	0	8	0
Barnet	2016–17	League Two	25	0	0	0	0	0	1 (Note: Appearance(s) in EFL Trophy)	0	26	0
Barnet	2017–18	League Two	16	0	0	0	2	0	2	0	20	0
Barnet	2018–19	National League	18	0	0	0	—		4 (Note: Two appearances in FA Trophy, two appearances in Middlesex Senior Cup)	0	22	0
Barnet	2019–20	National League	26	0	3	0	—		3 (Note: One appearance in FA Trophy, two appearances in National League playoffs)	0	32	0
Barnet	2020–21	National League	41	1	3	0	—		1 (Note: Appearance(s) in FA Trophy)	0	45	1
Barnet	2021–22	National League	37	0	1	0	—		2 (Note: One appearance in FA Trophy, one appearance in Middlesex Senior Cup)	0	40	0
Barnet	Total		171	1	7	0	2	0	17	0	197	1
Hampton & Richmond Borough (loan)	2015–16	Isthmian League Premier Division	15	1	0	0	—		4	0	19	1
Staines Town (loan)	2015–16	Isthmian League Premier Division	6	0	0	0	—		0	0	6	0
Woking (loan)	2018–19	National League South	6	0	1	0	—		0	0	7	0
Southend United	2022–23	National League	32	0	0	0	—		3	0	36	0
Southend United	2023–24	National League	32	0	1	0	–		1	0	34	0
Southend United	2024–25	National League	45	0	2	0	–		6 (Note: 3 appearances in FA Trophy, 3 appearances in National League play-offs)	0	53	0
Southend United	2025–26	National League	43	0	2	0	–		6 (Note: 5 appearances in FA Trophy, 1 appearances in National League play-offs)	0	51	0
Southend United	2026–27	National League	8	0	1	0	–		0	0	9	0
Southend United	Total		160	0	6	0	0	0	16	0	182	0
Hornchurch (loan)	2026–27	National League	0	0	1	0	–		1 (Note: Appearances in National League Cup)	0	2	0
Career total			388	2	15	0	2	0	38	0	443	2
