= Fumnaya Shomotun =

Nigerian footballer

Personal information
- Full name: Fumnaya Israel Abidemi Taoreed Shomotun
- Date of birth: 29 May 1997 (age 29)
- Place of birth: Nigeria
- Height: 1.73 m (5 ft 8 in)
- Position: Attacking midfielder

Team information
- Current team: Welling United

Youth career
- –2014: Brentford
- 2014–2015: Barnet

Senior career*
Years	Team	Apps	(Gls)
2014–2019	Barnet	20	(1)
2015	→ Staines Town (loan)	8	(0)
2017	→ Margate (loan)	2	(0)
2018	→ Wealdstone (loan)	9	(0)
2019	Wealdstone	16	(8)
2020	Hayes & Yeading United	4	(0)
2020	Wingate & Finchley	4	(0)
2022	Kingstonian	9	(1)
2022–2024	Sevenoaks Town	42	(18)
2024	Dartford	16	(2)
2024	Tonbridge Angels	2	(0)
2024	→ Cray Valley Paper Mills (loan)	4	(1)
2024–2026	Cray Valley Paper Mills	65	(8)
2026–	Welling United	6	(1)
- * Club domestic league appearances and goals as of 20:39, 6 September 2026 (UTC)

Fumnaya Israel Abidemi Taoreed Shomotun (born 29 May 1997) is a Nigeria-born footballer who plays as an attacking midfielder for Welling United.

== Career ==
Shomotun played youth football for Brentford before joining Barnet in early 2014. He made his first-team debut on 16 December 2014, as a substitute in an FA Trophy replay against Concord Rangers. Shomotun signed a one-year professional contract at the start of the 2015-16 season. He joined Staines Town on loan in November 2015, for whom he made eight appearances. Shomotun made his Football League debut on 13 February 2016, coming on as an 84th-minute substitute for Chris Hackett in a 2–0 away win at Dagenham & Redbridge. Shomotun joined Margate on loan on 13 January 2017.

His contract was extended by Barnet at the end of the 2017–18 season after the club exercised an option. Shomotun joined Wealdstone on loan on 7 September 2018. He scored on his debut in the FA Cup against Great Wakering Rovers on 22 September. He was released by the Bees at the end of the 2018–19 season.

Shomotun joined Wealdstone on 15 November 2019. He signed for Hayes & Yeading United on 1 January 2020. Later that month he joined Wingate & Finchley.

In July 2022, Shomotun joined Kingstonian.

Following a spell at Sevenoaks Town, Shomotun joined Dartford on 2 February 2024.

On 27 May 2024, Shomotun joined Tonbridge Angels. He joined Cray Valley Paper Mills on loan in September. The following month, he joined the club on a permanent basis.

== Career statistics ==
As of 3 September 2024

Club	Season	League			FA Cup		League Cup		Other		Total	
Club	Season	Division	Apps	Goals	Apps	Goals	Apps	Goals	Apps	Goals	Apps	Goals
Barnet	2014–15	Conference Premier	0	0	0	0	0	0	1 (Note: Appearance in the FA Trophy)	0	1	0
Barnet	2015–16	League Two	10	1	0	0	0	0	0	0	10	1
Barnet	2016–17	League Two	4	0	0	0	0	0	2 (Note: Appearances in the Football League Trophy)	0	6	0
Barnet	2017–18	League Two	6	0	0	0	0	0	1	0	7	0
Barnet	2018–19	National League	0	0	0	0	0	0	0	0	0	0
Barnet	Barnet total		20	1	0	0	0	0	4	0	24	1
Staines Town (loan)	2015–16	Isthmian League Premier Division	8	0	0	0	0	0	0	0	8	0
Margate (loan)	2016–17	National League South	2	0	0	0	0	0	0	0	2	0
Wealdstone (loan)	2018–19	National League South	9	0	3	2	0	0	1	1	13	3
Wealdstone	2019–20	National League South	1	0	0	0	0	0	0	0	1	0
Hayes & Yeading United	2019–20	SFL Premier Division South	4	0	0	0	0	0	0	0	4	0
Wingate & Finchley	2019–20	Isthmian League Premier Division	4	0	0	0	0	0	0	0	4	0
Kingstonian	2022–23	Isthmian League Premier Division	9	1	1	0	0	0	1	0	11	1
Sevenoaks Town	2022–23	Isthmian League South East Division	20	6	0	0	0	0	2 (Note: Appearance in the Velocity Cup)	0	22	6
Sevenoaks Town	2023–24	Isthmian League South East Division	22	3	4	0	0	0	5 (Note: Appearance in the Kent Senior Cup)	1	31	4
Sevenoaks Town	Sevenoaks Town total		42	9	4	0	0	0	7	1	53	10
Dartford	2023–24	National League South	16	2	0	0	0	0	3 (Note: Appearances in the London Senior Cup)	0	19	2
Tonbridge Angels	2024–25	National League South	2	0	0	0	0	0	0	0	2	0
Career total			117	13	8	2	0	0	16	2	141	17
