= Nana Kyei =

English footballer (born 1998)

Personal information
- Full name: Nana Emmanuel K. Kyei
- Date of birth: 10 January 1998 (age 28)
- Place of birth: Hackney, England
- Height: 1.80 m (5 ft 11 in)
- Position: Winger

Team information
- Current team: Enfield Town

Youth career
- 2007–2016: Barnet

Senior career*
Years	Team	Apps	(Gls)
2016–2019	Barnet	20	(0)
2018	→ Concord Rangers (loan)	4	(1)
2019	→ Hampton & Richmond Borough (loan)	4	(0)
2019	→ Potters Bar Town (loan)	6	(3)
2019	Maidstone United	14	(2)
2019–2020	Chelmsford City	5	(1)
2020–2021	Potters Bar Town	15	(3)
2021–2022	Hungerford Town	16	(1)
2022–2023	Concord Rangers	57	(10)
2023–2024	Aveley	33	(2)
2024–2026	Potters Bar Town	71	(11)
2026–	Enfield Town	4	(0)
- * Club domestic league appearances and goals as of 20:24, 6 September 2026 (UTC)

Nana Emmanuel K. Kyei (born 10 January 1998) is an English footballer who plays for Enfield Town.

== Career ==
Kyei joined the academy at Barnet aged nine, and stayed with the club through to senior level. He made his Football League debut when he started against Crawley Town on the final day of the 2015–16 season. Kyei joined Concord Rangers on loan on 5 November 2018. He then joined Hampton & Richmond Borough on loan on 11 January 2019. Kyei went out on loan for a third time when he joined Potters Bar Town on loan deadline day on 28 March 2019. He was released by the Bees at the end of the 2018–19 season. before joining Maidstone United on 1 July. After 17 appearances, Kyei left Maidstone by mutual consent in December 2019. On 24 December 2019, Kyei signed for Chelmsford City. In February 2020, Kyei returned to Potters Bar Town on a permanent deal. Kyei signed a contract with Hungerford Town for the 2021–22 season. In February 2022 he re-joined Concord Rangers.

On 29 June 2023, Kyei agreed to join newly-promoted National League South club, Aveley. Kyei re-joined Potters Bar in August 2024. He signed for Enfield Town for the 2026-27 season.

== Personal life ==
Kyei was born in England and is of Ghanaian descent.

== Career statistics ==
As of 13 February 2022

Club	Season	League			FA Cup		League Cup		Other		Total	
Club	Season	Division	Apps	Goals	Apps	Goals	Apps	Goals	Apps	Goals	Apps	Goals
Barnet	2015–16	League Two	1	0	0	0	0	0	0	0	1	0
Barnet	2016–17	League Two	12	0	0	0	0	0	2 (Note: Appearances in the Football League Trophy)	0	14	0
Barnet	2017–18	League Two	3	0	0	0	0	0	2	0	5	0
Barnet	2018–19	National League	4	0	0	0	0	0	0	0	4	0
Barnet	Total		20	0	0	0	0	0	4	0	24	0
Concord Rangers (loan)	2018–19	National League South	4	1	0	0	0	0	0	0	4	1
Hampton & Richmond Borough (loan)	2018–19	National League South	4	0	0	0	0	0	0	0	4	0
Potters Bar Town (loan)	2018–19	Isthmian League Premier Division	6	3	0	0	0	0	0	0	6	3
Maidstone United	2019–20	National League South	14	2	3	0	0	0	0	0	17	2
Chelmsford City	2019–20	National League South	5	1	0	0	0	0	1 (Note: Appearances in the FA Trophy)	0	6	1
Potters Bar Town	2019–20	Isthmian League Premier Division	6	0	0	0	0	0	0	0	6	0
Potters Bar Town	2020–21	Isthmian League Premier Division	9	3	2	0	0	0	0	0	11	3
Potters Bar Town	Total		15	3	2	0	0	0	0	0	17	3
Hungerford Town	2021–22	National League South	16	1	2	0	0	0	0	0	18	1
Concord Rangers	2021–22	National League South	1	1	0	0	0	0	0	0	1	1
Career total			85	12	7	0	0	0	5	0	97	12
