= Wesley Fonguck =

English footballer

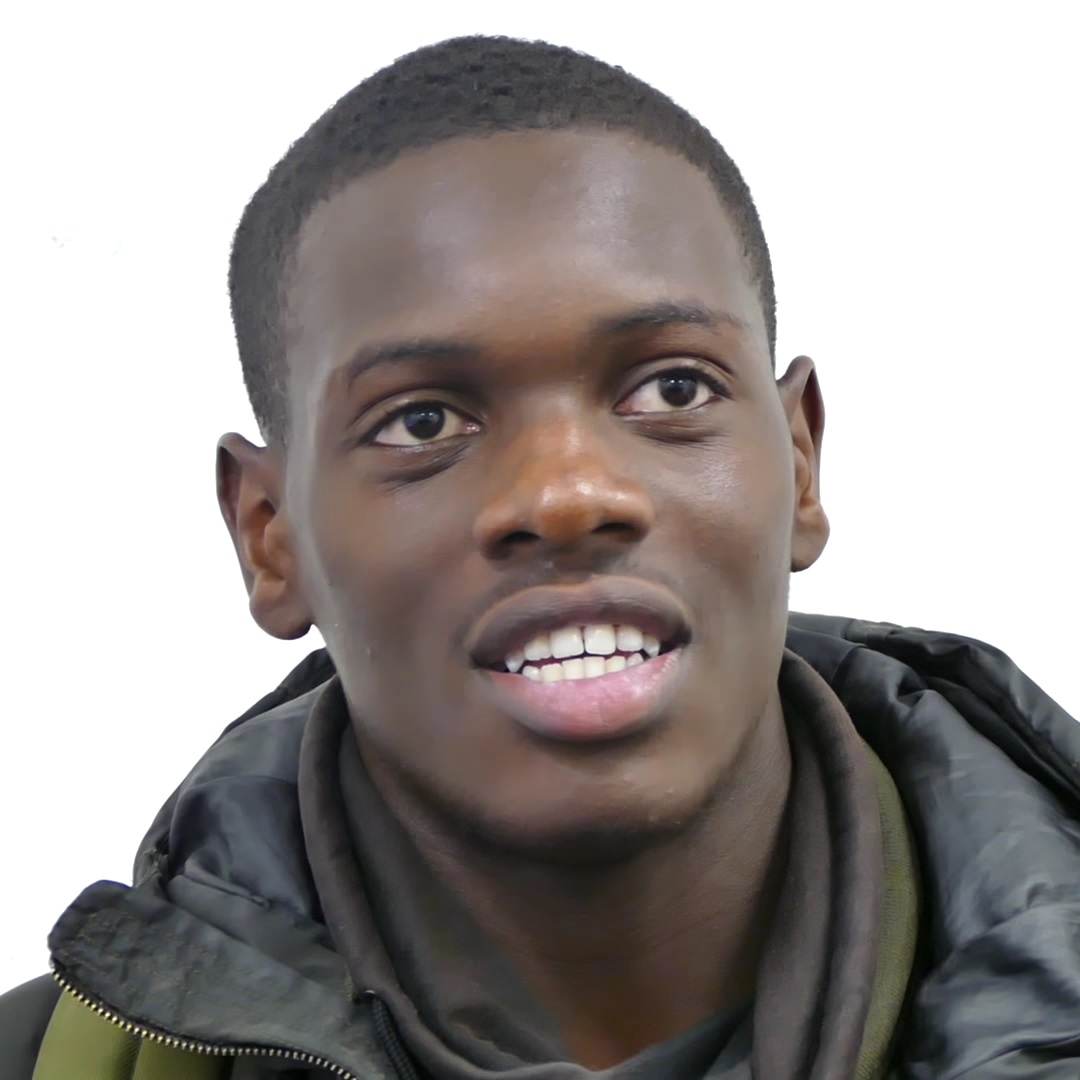
- Fonguck in November 2016

Personal information
- Full name: Wesley Joseph Nkong Fonguck
- Date of birth: 16 July 1997 (age 29)
- Place of birth: Lambeth, England
- Height: 1.85 m (6 ft 1 in)
- Position: Central midfielder

Team information
- Current team: Hampton & Richmond Borough
- Number: 8

Youth career
- –2013: Crystal Palace
- 2014: Croydon
- 2014–2015: Barnet

Senior career*
Years	Team	Apps	(Gls)
2014	Croydon	1	(0)
2014–2022	Barnet	121	(12)
2015–2016	→ Hendon (loan)	13	(0)
2017	→ Hampton & Richmond Borough (loan)	3	(0)
2022–2024	Southend United	73	(5)
2024–2026	Ebbsfleet United	16	(1)
2025	→ Monterey Bay FC (loan)	28	(0)
2026	Farnborough	16	(3)
2026–	Hampton & Richmond Borough	0	(0)

International career^{‡}
2018–2019	England C	2	(0)
- * Club domestic league appearances and goals as of 09:21, 16 June 2026 (UTC) ‡ National team caps and goals as of 10 June 2019

Wesley Joseph Nkong Fonguck (/ˈfɒŋɡʊk/ FONG-guuk; born 16 July 1997) is an English footballer who plays for National League South club Hampton & Richmond Borough.

== Career ==
Fonguck played youth football for Crystal Palace before joining Combined Counties Football League side Croydon, for whom he made one league appearance.

Fonguck joined Barnet as a second-year scholar for the 2014–15 season, and made his senior debut on 16 December 2014, starting in an FA Trophy replay against Concord Rangers. He signed a one-year professional contract in June 2015. He joined Hendon on loan in November 2015, for whom he made 13 appearances. He made his Football League debut when he came on as a substitute against Crawley Town on the final day of the 2015–16 season. On 20 January 2017, he joined Hampton & Richmond Borough on loan. Fonguck left the Bees at the end of the 2018–19 season after turning down a new deal. He went on trial at Telstar in July 2019. Fonguck re-joined the Bees on a two-year deal on 6 September 2019. In December 2020, he was ruled out for the remainder of the 2020–21 season with an anterior cruciate ligament injury. On his departure from the club in July 2022, Fonguck had made 154 appearances for the Bees, scoring fifteen goals.

In July 2024, Fonguck joined Ebbsfleet United on a two-year deal. In January 2025, the club announced that he was to head out on loan for an eleven-month period in order to take up a playing opportunity in the United States.

In January 2025, Ebbsfleet sent Fonguck to USL Championship club Monterey Bay FC on a season-long loan.

On 12 February 2026, Fonguck joined fellow National League South side, Farnborough.

On 9 June 2026, Hampton & Richmond Borough announced that Fonguck had signed for the South West London side after his departure from Farnborough.

== International career ==
In September 2018, Fonguck was called up to the England C squad for their friendly the following month against Estonia U23. He would start for Paul Fairclough's side on his international debut and see out the full 90 minutes in a 1–0 win.

== Career statistics ==
As of 25 April 2026

Club	Season	League			National Cup		League Cup		Other		Total	
Club	Season	Division	Apps	Goals	Apps	Goals	Apps	Goals	Apps	Goals	Apps	Goals
Croydon	2013–14	Combined Counties League Premier Division	1	0	0	0	—		0	0	1	0
Barnet	2014–15	Conference Premier	0	0	0	0	—		1 (Note: Appearances in the FA Trophy)	0	1	0
Barnet	2015–16	League Two	1	0	0	0	0	0	0	0	1	0
Barnet	2016–17	League Two	3	0	0	0	0	0	1 (Note: Appearances in the Football League Trophy)	0	4	0
Barnet	2017–18	League Two	19	0	1	0	2	0	3	0	25	0
Barnet	2018–19	National League	36	8	7	0	—		5 (Note: Five appearances and one goal in the FA Trophy)	1	48	9
Barnet	2019–20	National League	19	1	0	0	—		4	0	23	1
Barnet	2020–21	National League	11	3 (Note: The goal scored on 2 December 2020, originally attributed to Muhammadu Faal and still listed as such by some sources, was actually scored by Fonguck.)	2	1	—		0	0	13	4
Barnet	2021–22	National League	32	0	1	0	—		3 (Note: One appearance and one goal in the FA Trophy)	1	36	1
Barnet	Total		121	12	11	1	2	0	17	2	151	15
Hendon (loan)	2015–16	Isthmian League Premier Division	13	0	—		—		—		13	0
Hampton & Richmond Borough (loan)	2016–17	National League South	3	0	—		—		—		3	0
Southend United	2022–23	National League	35	2	1	0	—		2	0	38	2
Southend United	2023–24	National League	38	3	1	0	—		1	0	40	3
Southend United	Total		73	5	2	0	0	0	3	0	78	5
Ebbsfleet United	2024–25	National League	16	1	1	0	—		1 (Note: Appearances in National League Cup)	0	18	1
Ebbsfleet United	2025–26	National League South	0	0	—		—		—		0	0
Ebbsfleet United	Total		16	1	1	0	—		1	0	18	1
Monterey Bay FC (loan)	2025	USL Championship	28	0	1	0	3	0	—		32	0
Farnborough	2025–26	National League South	16	3	—		—		—		16	3
Career total			270	21	15	1	5	0	22	2	310	24
