= Dave Tarpey =

English footballer

Personal information
- Full name: David Charles Tarpey
- Date of birth: 14 November 1988 (age 37)
- Place of birth: Reading, England
- Position: Forward

Senior career*
Years	Team	Apps	(Gls)
2005–2007	Henley Town		
2007–2009	Basingstoke Town	61	(4)
2009–2012	Hampton & Richmond Borough	109	(27)
2009	→ Walton & Hersham (loan)	8	(6)
2009–2010	→ Chertsey Town (loan)		
2012–2014	Farnborough	56	(13)
2014	Hampton & Richmond Borough	20	(11)
2014–2017	Maidenhead United	124	(87)
2017–2019	Barnet	17	(1)
2018–2019	→ Maidenhead United (loan)	3	(0)
2019	→ Woking (loan)	7	(3)
2019–2021	Woking	46	(9)
2021–2022	Bracknell Town	25	(17)
2022–2023	Leatherhead	35	(16)
2023	→ Hungerford Town (loan)	6	(1)
2023	→ Gosport Borough (loan)	2	(0)
2023–2024	Marlow	33	(22)
2025–2026	Reading City	4	(1)
Total		693	(220)

Managerial career
- 2024-2026: Reading City (player-assistant)
- * Club domestic league appearances and goals

David Charles Tarpey (born 14 November 1988) is an English former footballer who plays as a forward for Reading City, where he is also assistant manager.

== Career ==
Tarpey began his career at Henley Town, where he played for two years in the senior team before joining Basingstoke Town in 2007. After two years with Basingstoke, he joined Hampton & Richmond Borough to seek more frequent first-team football. Tarpey broke into the first team following loan spells with Walton & Hersham and Chertsey Town, before joining Farnborough in June 2012 after turning down a new contract at the Beveree.

Tarpey scored 13 league goals in eighteen months at the Yellows before his contract was cancelled in January 2014 by mutual consent. He then re-joined Hampton.

For the 2014–15 season, Tarpey joined Maidenhead United. After 36 league goals in his first two seasons, he scored 44 goals in 41 league games in the 2016–17 season as Maidenhead won the National League South, a new record for the league.

He turned down an offer from Coventry City in summer 2017 and signed a new contract with the Magpies. He opened his first season in the National League with seven goals in his first six games, before signing for Barnet on 31 August 2017 which enabled him to leave his full-time job as a fire & security alarm installer. Tarpey injured his anterior cruciate ligament in his second appearance for the Bees, ruling him out for the remainder of the 2017–18 season. Tarpey returned from injury in October 2018 before re-joining Maidenhead on loan on 26 November 2018.

On 4 February 2019, Tarpey reunited with former manager, Alan Dowson at Woking on a 28-day loan. He scored his first goal for the club in his second appearance against East Thurrock United. He returned to Barnet and scored for them for the first time on 19 March against Harrogate Town. Tarpey turned down the offer of a new contract from the Bees and left the club at the end of the 2018–19 season in order to return to part-time football.

On 23 May 2019, it was confirmed in an interview by Alan Dowson that Tarpey would be rejoining Woking on a permanent contract for the following season. He scored nine goals in 51 games for the Cards before joining Isthmian League side Bracknell Town for the 2021–22 season. Following just one campaign in Berkshire with Bracknell, Tarpey announced he would be leaving the club in May 2022, with thirty appearances and nineteen goals to his name.

On 18 May 2022, after leaving Bracknell, Tarpey opted to join newly-relegated, Leatherhead for the 2022–23 campaign. On 17 August 2023, Tarpey joined Hungerford Town on a short-term loan. Tarpey was then loaned to Gosport Borough in September 2023.

On 15 November 2023, Leatherhead announced that Tarpey was leaving the club amicably and by mutual consent, with the player's desire to get more first team football being a key reason. Two days later, Isthmian South Central rivals Marlow announced that Tarpey had joined the club.

On 17 October 2024, Tarpey announced his retirement from football after rupturing his anterior cruciate ligament as well as suffering ligament damage. He was then appointed as attacking coach at Reading City, before being appointed assistant manager ahead of the 2025-26 season. Tarpey also returned to playing that season.

== Career statistics ==
As of match played 5 October 2024.

Appearances and goals by club, season and competition
Club	Season	League			FA Cup		EFL Cup		Other		Total	
Club	Season	Division	Apps	Goals	Apps	Goals	Apps	Goals	Apps	Goals	Apps	Goals
Henley Town	2005–06	Hellenic League Premier Division	No data currently available									
Henley Town	2006–07	Hellenic League Division One East	No data currently available									
Basingstoke Town	2007–08	Conference South	25	1	—		—		—		25	1
Basingstoke Town	2008–09	Conference South	36	3	—		—		—		36	3
Basingstoke Town	Total		61	4	—		—		—		61	4
Hampton & Richmond Borough	2009–10	Conference South	32	10	—		—		—		32	10
Hampton & Richmond Borough	2010–11	Conference South	39	7	—		—		2 (Note: Appearance(s) in FA Trophy)	0	41	7
Hampton & Richmond Borough	2011–12	Conference South	38	10	—		—		4	6	42	16
Hampton & Richmond Borough	Total		109	27	—		—		6	6	115	31
Walton & Hersham (loan)	2009–10	Isthmian League Division One South	8	6	0	0	0	0	0	0	8	6
Chertsey Town (loan)	2009–10	CCL Premier Division	No data currently available									
Farnborough	2012–13	Conference South	36	9	1	1	—		2	0	39	10
Farnborough	2013–14	Conference South	20	4	2	0	—		2	1	24	5
Farnborough	Total		56	13	3	1	—		4	1	63	15
Hampton & Richmond Borough	2013–14	Isthmian League Premier Division	20	11	0	0	—		0	0	20	11
Maidenhead United	2014–15	Conference South	37	20	3	0	—		3	2	43	22
Maidenhead United	2015–16	National League South	40	16	6	3	—		2	2	48	21
Maidenhead United	2016–17	National League South	41	44	1	0	—		2	1	44	45
Maidenhead United	2017–18	National League	6	7	0	0	—		0	0	6	7
Maidenhead United	Total		124	87	10	3	—		7	5	141	95
Barnet	2017–18	League Two	2	0	0	0	0	0	0	0	2	0
Barnet	2018–19	National League	15	1	0	0	—		0	0	15	1
Barnet	Total		17	1	0	0	0	0	0	0	17	1
Maidenhead United (loan)	2018–19	National League	3	0	0	0	—		0	0	3	0
Woking (loan)	2018–19	National League South	7	3	0	0	—		0	0	7	3
Woking	2019–20	National League	36	8	2	0	—		1	0	39	8
Woking	2020–21	National League	10	1	1	0	—		1	0	12	1
Woking	Total		46	9	3	0	—		2	0	51	9
Bracknell Town	2021–22	Isthmian League South Central Division	25	17	2	1	—		3	1	30	19
Leatherhead	2022–23	Isthmian League South Central Division	32	16	2	2	—		4 (Note: Two appearances in Alan Turvey Trophy, two appearances in Surrey Senior Cup)	0	38	18
Leatherhead	2023–24	Isthmian League South Central Division	3	0	0	0	—		0	0	3	0
Leatherhead	Total		35	16	2	2	—		4	0	41	18
Hungerford Town (loan)	2023–24	SFL Premier Division South	6	1	—		—		—		6	1
Gosport Borough (loan)	2023–24	SFL Premier Division South	2	0	1	0	—		—		3	0
Marlow	2023–24	Isthmian League South Central Division	25	20	0	0	—		5 (Note: Three appearances and four goals in Berks & Bucks Senior Cup, two appearances in playoffs)	4	30	24
Marlow	2024–25	SFL Premier Division South	8	2	1	0	—		1	0	10	2
Marlow	Total		33	22	1	0	—		6	4	40	26
Career total			689	219	22	7	0	0	30	17	590	228

== Honours ==
Maidenhead United

- National League South: 2016–17

Bracknell Town

- Isthmian League South Central Division: 2021–22

Individual

- National League South Golden Boot: 2016–17
- National League South Player of the Year: 2016-17
