= Malakai Mars =

English footballer

Personal information
- Full name: Malakai Daylan Hinckson-Mars
- Date of birth: 1 December 1998 (age 27)
- Place of birth: Enfield, England
- Position: Forward

Youth career
- Barnet
- 2014–2017: Chelsea
- 2016: → Crystal Palace (youth loan)
- 2017: → Derby County (youth loan)

Senior career*
Years	Team	Apps	(Gls)
2017–2019	Barnet	1	(0)
2018	→ Farnborough (loan)	4	(0)
2018	→ Hanwell Town (loan)	5	(0)
2019	Cockfosters	1	(0)
2019	Badshot Lea	1	(2)
2019–2020	Farnborough	9	(0)
Total		21	(2)
- * Club domestic league appearances and goals as of 01:53, 13 February 2021 (UTC)

Malakai Daylan Hinckson-Mars (born 1 December 1998) is an English professional footballer who last played for Farnborough as a forward.

== Career ==
Mars began his career with Barnet, before joining Chelsea as an under-16 in November 2014. He signed a scholarship in July 2015, and he spent time with Crystal Palace on a youth loan later that season. He turned professional with Chelsea in June 2016, signing a two-year contract. He joined Derby County on loan in January 2017, before returning to Barnet in August 2017 for an undisclosed fee. He made his professional debut on 23 September 2017, coming on as a substitute in a league match against Crawley Town. He joined Farnborough on loan in March 2018. He then joined Hanwell Town on loan on 6 November 2018. He was released by the Bees at the end of the 2018–19 season. Mars joined Cockfosters in September 2019. Mars played one game for Badshot Lea in November 2019 - in which he scored twice - before re-joining Farnborough later that month.

== Career statistics ==
As of match played 25 January 2020

Appearances and goals by club, season and competition
Club	Season	League			FA Cup		League Cup		Other		Total	
Club	Season	Division	Apps	Goals	Apps	Goals	Apps	Goals	Apps	Goals	Apps	Goals
Barnet	2017–18	League Two	1	0	0	0	0	0	1 (Note: Appearance in the EFL Trophy)	0	2	0
Barnet	2018–19	National League	0	0	0	0	0	0	0	0	0	0
Barnet	Barnet total		1	0	0	0	0	0	1	0	2	0
Farnborough (loan)	2017–18	SFL Premier Division	4	0	0	0	0	0	0	0	4	0
Hanwell Town (loan)	2018–19	IL South Central Division	5	0	0	0	0	0	0	0	5	0
Cockfosters	2019–20	SSML Premier Division	1	0	0	0	0	0	1	0	2	0
Badshot Lea	2019–20	CCL Premier Division	1	2	0	0	0	0	0	0	1	2
Farnborough	2019–20	SFL Premier Division South	9	0	0	0	0	0	0	0	9	0
Career total			21	2	0	0	0	0	2	0	23	2
