= 2015–16 Barnet F.C. season =

Barnet
2015–16 season
- Chairman: Anthony Kleanthous
- Manager: Martin Allen
- Stadium: The Hive Stadium
- League Two: 15th
- FA Cup: Second round (knocked out by Newport County)
- League Cup: Second round (knocked out by Wolverhampton Wanderers)
- FL Trophy: First round (knocked out by Yeovil Town)
- Top goalscorer: League: John Akinde (23); All: John Akinde (24)
- Highest home attendance: 4,008 vs Luton Town (28 Mar 2016)
- Lowest home attendance: 1,322 vs Notts County (19 Apr 2016)

The 2015–16 Barnet F.C. season was the team's 128th year in existence, and their first back in League Two since the 2012–13 season, after gaining promotion in the 2014–15 season. Along with competing in League Two, the club also participated in the FA Cup, League Cup and Football League Trophy. The season covers the period from 1 July 2015 to 30 June 2016.

== Squad statistics ==
=== Appearances and goals ===
As of 7 May 2016

Number	Position	Nationality	Name	League		FA Cup		League Cup		FL Trophy		Total	
Number	Position	Nationality	Name	Apps.	Goals	Apps.	Goals	Apps.	Goals	Apps.	Goals	Apps.	Goals
1	GK	(Republic of Ireland)	Graham Stack	7	0	0	0	1	0	0	0	8	0
2	DF	(Trinidad and Tobago)	Gavin Hoyte	16 (3)	1	0 (1)	0	1	0	1	0	18 (4)	1
3	DF	(England)	Elliot Johnson	41	1	1 (1)	0	2	0	1	0	45 (1)	1
4	DF	(France)	Bira Dembélé	25 (1)	3	1	0	2	1	1	0	29 (1)	4
5	DF	(England)	Bondz N'Gala	39 (3)	1	2	0	1 (1)	0	0	0	42 (4)	1
6	DF	(England)	Michael Nelson	22 (5)	1	2	0	2	0	1	0	27 (5)	1
7	MF	(England)	Andy Yiadom	40	6	2	0	1	1	0	0	43	7
8	MF	(England)	Curtis Weston	36 (1)	3	1	0	1 (1)	0	1	0	39 (2)	3
9	FW	(England)	John Akinde	41 (2)	23	2	0	1 (1)	1	1	0	45 (3)	24
11	MF	(Portugal)	Mauro Vilhete	8 (7)	0	0	0	1 (1)	0	0	0	9 (8)	0
12	MF	(England)	Luke Gambin	30 (14)	4	1 (1)	0	1 (1)	0	0	0	32 (16)	4
14	MF	(England)	Sam Togwell	34 (4)	1	0	0	1	0	0	0	35 (4)	1
15	MF	(England)	Ben Tomlinson	1 (2)	0	0	0	1	0	1	0	3 (2)	0
16	MF	(England)	Tom Champion	19 (7)	0	1	1	2	0	1	0	23 (7)	1
17	DF	(England)	Sam Muggleton	8 (15)	0	2	0	1	0	0 (1)	0	11 (16)	0
18	FW	(England)	Michael Gash	20 (14)	9	2	1	0 (1)	0	0	0	22 (15)	10
19	FW	(England)	Shaun Batt	4 (13)	0	1 (1)	0	1	0	1	0	7 (14)	0
20	MF	(Nigeria)	Fumnaya Shomotun	3 (7)	1	0	0	0	0	0	0	3 (7)	1
21	GK	(England)	Jamie Stephens	29	0	2	0	1	0	1	0	33	0
22	FW	(England)	Mathew Stevens	2 (7)	1	0	0	0	0	0 (1)	0	2 (8)	1
23	FW	(England)	Ryan Gondoh	0	0	0	0	0	0	0 (1)	0	0 (1)	0
28	FW	(England)	Justin Nwogu	2 (2)	0	0	0	0	0	0	0	2 (2)	0
31	GK	(England)	Kai McKenzie-Lyle	0 (1)	0	0	0	0	0	0	0	0 (1)	0
34	MF	(England)	Mark Randall	8 (4)	2	0	0	0	0	0	0	8 (4)	2
35	MF	(England)	Chris Hackett (on loan from Northampton Town)	5	0	0	0	0	0	0	0	5	0
36	DF	(Sierra Leone)	Alie Sesay	10 (3)	0	0	0	0	0	0	0	10 (3)	0
37	DF	(England)	James Pearson	14 (1)	0	0	0	0	0	0	0	14 (1)	0
40	MF	(England)	Harry Taylor	4 (4)	0	0	0	0	0	0	0	4 (4)	0
41	DF	(England)	Joe Gater	0	0	0	0	0	0	0	0	0	0
42	DF	(England)	Charlie Kennedy	0	0	0	0	0	0	0	0	0	0
44	MF	(England)	Wesley Fonguck	0 (1)	0	0	0	0	0	0	0	0 (1)	0
45	FW	(Romania)	Shane Cojocarel	0	0	0	0	0	0	0	0	0	0
47	MF	(England)	Nana Kyei	1	0	0	0	0	0	0	0	1	0
48	DF	(England)	Tom Day	0 (1)	0	0	0	0	0	0	0	0 (1)	0
Players who have left the club:
10	FW	(Jamaica)	Kevin Lisbie	0 (3)	0	0 (1)	0	0	0	0	0	0 (4)	0
24	FW	(England)	Aaron McLean	13 (7)	5	0	0	1	0	1	0	15 (7)	5
25	GK	(New Zealand)	Max Crocombe (on loan from Oxford United)	5	0	0	0	0	0	0	0	5	0
26	DF	(England)	Hakeem Odoffin	0 (1)	0	1	0	0	0	0	0	1 (1)	0
27	MF	(England)	Josh Clarke (on loan from Brentford)	10	3	0	0	0	0	0	0	10	3
29	MF	(England)	Nicky Bailey	1 (1)	0	1 (1)	0	0	0	0	0	2 (2)	0
30	GK	(Jamaica)	Ravan Constable	0	0	0	0	0	0	0	0	0	0
32	MF	(England)	Jack Stacey (on loan from Reading)	2	0	0	0	0	0	0	0	2	0
33	GK	(Republic of Ireland)	Ian Lawlor (on loan from Manchester City)	5	0	0	0	0	0	0	0	5	0
38	FW	(England)	James Roberts (on loan from Oxford United)	1 (1)	0	0	0	0	0	0	0	1 (1)	0
43	DF	(England)	Tamille Roache	0	0	0	0	0	0	0	0	0	0
46	DF	(England)	Chinua Cole	0	0	0	0	0	0	0	0	0	0

=== Top scorers ===
Place	Position	Nation	Number	Name	League Two	FA Cup	League Cup	FL Trophy	Total
1	FW	(England)	9	John Akinde	23	0	1	0	24
2	FW	(England)	18	Michael Gash	9	1	0	0	10
3	MF	(England)	7	Andy Yiadom	6	0	1	0	7
4	FW	(England)	24	Aaron McLean	5	0	0	0	5
5=	MF	(England)	12	Luke Gambin	4	0	0	0	4
5=	DF	(France)	4	Bira Dembélé	3	0	1	0	4
7=	MF	(England)	27	Josh Clarke	3	0	0	0	3
7=	MF	(England)	8	Curtis Weston	3	0	0	0	3
9=				Own goals	2	0	0	0	2
9=	MF	(England)	34	Mark Randall	2	0	0	0	2
11=	DF	(England)	5	Bondz N'Gala	1	0	0	0	1
11=	DF	(Trinidad and Tobago)	2	Gavin Hoyte	1	0	0	0	1
11=	DF	(England)	6	Michael Nelson	1	0	0	0	1
11=	FW	(England)	22	Mathew Stevens	1	0	0	0	1
11=	MF	(Nigeria)	20	Fumnaya Shomotun	1	0	0	0	1
11=	MF	(England)	14	Sam Togwell	1	0	0	0	1
11=	DF	(England)	3	Elliot Johnson	1	0	0	0	1
11=	MF	(England)	16	Tom Champion	0	1	0	0	1
				Totals	67	2	3	0	72

== Transfers ==
=== Transfers in ===
Date from	Position	Nationality	Name	From	Fee	Ref.
1 July 2015	CM	ENG	Tom Champion	Cambridge United	Free transfer	
1 July 2015	CB	FRA	Bira Dembélé	Stevenage	Free transfer	
1 July 2015	RB	TRI	Gavin Hoyte	Gillingham	Free transfer	
1 July 2015	CF	JAM	Kevin Lisbie	Leyton Orient	Free transfer	
1 July 2015	CF	ENG	Ben Tomlinson	Lincoln City	Free transfer	
9 July 2015	RW	ENG	Shaun Batt	Leyton Orient	Free transfer	
3 August 2015	CB	ENG	Michael Nelson	Cambridge United	Free transfer	
6 August 2015	GK	ENG	Jamie Stephens	Newport County	Free transfer	
19 August 2015	CF	ENG	Aaron McLean	Bradford City	Free transfer	
23 October 2015	MF	ENG	Nicky Bailey	Millwall	Free transfer	
12 November 2015	GK	JAM	Ravan Constable	Cockfosters	Free transfer	
November 2015	DF	ENG	Chinua Cole	Farnborough	Free transfer	
14 January 2016	MF	ENG	Mark Randall	Milton Keynes Dons	Free transfer	
15 January 2016	DF	SLE	Alie Sesay	Leicester City	Free transfer	
2 February 2016	DF	ENG	James Pearson	Free agent	Free transfer	

=== Loans in ===
Date from	Position	Nationality	Name	From	Date until	Ref.
18 September 2015	GK	NZL	Max Crocombe	Oxford United	16 October 2015	
15 October 2015	DF	ENG	Josh Clarke	Brentford		
23 November 2015	MF	ENG	Jack Stacey	Reading		
12 December 2015	GK	IRE	Ian Lawlor	Manchester City		
14 January 2016	MF	ENG	Chris Hackett	Northampton Town	End of season	
18 September 2015	FW	ENG	James Roberts	Oxford United	16 October 2015	

=== Loans out ===
Date from	Position	Nationality	Name	To	Date until	Ref.
28 August 2015	LW	ROU	Shane Cojocărel	Billericay Town	26 September 2015	
17 September 2015	DF	ENG	Tamille Roache	Metropolitan Police	17 October 2015	
17 September 2015	CF	ENG	Ben Tomlinson	Grimsby Town	17 October 2015	
18 September 2015	DF	ENG	Harry Taylor	Hampton & Richmond Borough	18 October 2015	
October 2015	DF	ENG	Joe Gater	Cheshunt	November 2015	
29 October 2015	CF	ENG	Ben Tomlinson	Tranmere Rovers	January 2016	
30 October 2015	MF	POR	Mauro Vilhete	Boreham Wood	January 2016	
5 November 2015	DF	ENG	Charlie Kennedy	Northwood	December 2015	
26 November 2015	MF	ENG	Wesley Fonguck	Hendon	2 January 2016	
30 November 2015	MF	NGA	Fumnaya Shomotun	Staines Town	January 2016	
November 2015	DF	ENG	Chinua Cole	Bedford		
11 December 2015	FW	ENG	Ryan Gondoh	Hendon	9 January 2016	
23 December 2015	LW	ROU	Shane Cojocărel	Northwood	January 2016	
23 December 2015	DF	ENG	Joe Gater	Chesham United	January 2016	
5 February 2016	DF	ENG	Charlie Kennedy	Hayes & Yeading United		
5 February 2016	FW	ENG	Justin Nwogu	Hayes & Yeading United		
11 February 2016	FW	ENG	Ben Tomlinson	Barrow		
February 2016	DF	ENG	Chinua Cole	Staines Town		
18 February 2016	FW	ENG	Ryan Gondoh	Staines Town		
18 February 2016	DF	ENG	Harry Taylor	Staines Town		

=== Transfers out ===
Date from	Position	Nationality	Name	To	Fee	Ref.
1 July 2015	RW	ENG	Iffy Allen	Yeovil Town	Free transfer	(Note: Following Allen's release he joined Yeovil Town.)
1 July 2015	LW	ENG	Lee Cook	Eastleigh	Free transfer	(Note: Following Cook's release he joined Eastleigh.)
1 July 2015	GK	ENG	Sam Cowler	Heybridge Swifts	Free transfer	(Note: Following Cowler's release he joined Heybridge Swifts.)
1 July 2015	CF	ENG	Charlie MacDonald	Boreham Wood	Free transfer	(Note: Following MacDonald's release he joined Boreham Wood.)
1 July 2015	CF	BRB	Jon Nurse	Metropolitan Police	Free transfer	(Note: Following Nurse's release he joined Metropolitan Police.)
1 July 2015	CB	ENG	Jack Saville	Aldershot Town	Free transfer	(Note: Following Saville's release he joined Aldershot Town.)
1 July 2015	CB	WAL	David Stephens	Boreham Wood	Released	(Note: Following Stephens's release he joined Boreham Wood.)
1 July 2015	CF	SCO	George Sykes	Dartford	Free transfer	
2 July 2015	AM	ESP	Luisma	Arenas Club de Getxo	Free transfer	(Note: Following Luisma's departure he joined Arenas Club de Getxo.)
15 July 2015	RW	ATG	Keanu Marsh-Brown	Forest Green Rovers	Undisclosed	
December 2015	GK	JAM	Ravan Constable	London Tigers	Released	
11 January 2016	FW	JAM	Kevin Lisbie	Free Agent	Released	
14 January 2016	FW	ENG	Aaron McLean	Ebbsfleet United	Free transfer	
14 January 2016	DF	ENG	Tamille Roache	Marlow	Released	
29 January 2016	DF	ENG	Hakeem Odoffin	Wolves	Undisclosed	

== Competitions ==
=== Pre-season friendlies ===
On 29 May 2015, Barnet announced their first two pre-season friendlies against Peterborough United and Milton Keynes Dons. On 9 June 2015, Barnet added five more friendlies against Hungerford Town, St Albans City, Maidenhead United, Eastleigh and Northwood. A fixture against Crystal Palace was announced on 19 June 2015.

4 July 2015 Friendly	Barnet	6–1	Hungerford Town	Canons Park
15:00 BST	J. Akinde 14' (pen.), 19', 21'; Togwell 42'; Stevens 72'; S. Akinde 89'	Report	Brown 30'	Stadium: The Hive Stadium; Attendance: 331

11 July 2015 Friendly	Barnet	3–5	Crystal Palace	Canons Park
15:00 BST	Akinde 2'; Gambin 64'; Lisbie 80'	Report	Gayle 3', 11', 50'; Allassani 76'; Campbell 83'	Stadium: The Hive Stadium; Attendance: 2,044

14 July 2015 Friendly	St Albans City	2–3	Barnet	St Albans
19:45 BST	Thomas 21'; Malcolm 33'	Report	Gash 10'; Batt 66'; J. Taylor 69'	Stadium: Clarence Park

18 July 2015 Friendly	Maidenhead United	0–0	Barnet	Maidenhead
15:00 BST				Stadium: York Road

18 July 2015 Friendly	Bedfont & Feltham	P–P	Barnet XI	Bedfont
15:00 BST		Barnet failed to turn up for this fixture		Stadium: The Orchard

21 July 2015 Friendly	Barnet	1–2	Peterborough United	Canons Park
19:45 BST	Gash 90'	Report	Coulibaly 50'; Anderson 66'	Stadium: The Hive Stadium

25 July 2015 Friendly	Barnet	3–1	Milton Keynes Dons	Canons Park
15:00 BST	Akinde 27' 39'	Report	Church 3' (pen.)	Stadium: The Hive Stadium; Referee: Mick Russell

28 July 2015 Friendly	Potters Bar Town	0–2	Barnet XI	Potters Bar
19:45 BST			Stevens 5'; Nwogu 85'	Stadium: Parkfield

1 August 2015 Friendly	Eastleigh	0–2	Barnet	Eastleigh
15:00 BST		Report	Yiadom 2'; Vilhete 15'	Stadium: Ten Acres; Referee: Adrian Quelch

3 August 2015 Friendly	Northwood	4–3	Barnet	Northwood
19:30 BST	Stead 20'; Vassell 21'; Munday 51'; Brown 60'	Report	Stevens 15', 23', 86'	Stadium: Northwood Park

=== League Two ===
==== League table ====
Pos	Team	Pld	W	D	L	GF	GA	GD	Pts
13	Wycombe Wanderers	46	17	13	16	45	44	+1	64
14	Exeter City	46	17	13	16	63	65	−2	64
15	Barnet	46	17	11	18	67	68	−1	62
16	Hartlepool United	46	15	6	25	49	72	−23	51
17	Notts County	46	14	9	23	54	83	−29	51

Updated to match(es) played on 7 May 2016. Source: BBC Sport
Rules for classification: 1) Points; 2) Goal difference; 3) Number of goals scored

==== Matches ====
===== August =====
8 August 2015 1	Leyton Orient	2–0	Barnet	Leyton
15:00 BST	Simpson 74'; McCallum 75'	Report		Stadium: Brisbane Road; Attendance: 6,151; Referee: Iain Williamson

15 August 2015 2	Barnet	0–2	Wycombe Wanderers	Canons Park
15:00 BST		Report	Thompson 53', 90' (pen.)	Stadium: The Hive Stadium; Attendance: 2,563; Referee: Charles Breakspear

18 August 2015 3	Barnet	2–0	Northampton Town	Canons Park
19:45 BST	Akinde 63' (pen.), 90'	Report	Taylor (red card) 63'	Stadium: The Hive Stadium; Attendance: 2,466; Referee: Lee Swabey

22 August 2015 4	Bristol Rovers	3–1	Barnet	Horfield
15:00 BST	Brown 2'; Easter 77'; Taylor 87'	Report	Weston 85'	Stadium: Memorial Stadium; Attendance: 7,107; Referee: Ross Joyce

29 August 2015 5	Barnet	0–0	Cambridge United	Canons Park
15:00 BST		Report		Stadium: The Hive Stadium; Attendance: 2,406; Referee: Nick Kinseley

===== September =====
5 September 2015 6	Carlisle United	3–2	Barnet	Carlisle
14:00 BST	Miller 2'; Asamoah 19', 64'	Report	Dembélé 29'; Gash 31'	Stadium: Brunton Park; Attendance: 4,925; Referee: Nigel Miller

12 September 2015 7	Portsmouth	3–1	Barnet	Milton
15:00 BST	Chaplin 37', 90'; McGurk 54'	Report	Yiadom 25'; Stephens (red card) 66'	Stadium: Fratton Park; Attendance: 16,217; Referee: Darren England

19 September 2015 8	Barnet	3–2	Stevenage	Canons Park
15:00 BST	N'Gala 48'; McLean 63'; Gash 78'	Report	Franks 11'; Hitchcock 50'	Stadium: The Hive Stadium; Attendance: 2,480; Referee: James Adcock

26 September 2015 9	Barnet	3–1	Dagenham & Redbridge	Canons Park
15:00 BST	Gash 1', 56'; Yiadom 34'	Report	Jones 66'	Stadium: The Hive Stadium; Attendance: 2,079; Referee: Dean Whitestone

29 September 2015 10	Plymouth Argyle	2–1	Barnet	Plymouth
19:45 BST	Carey 53'; Jervis 60'	Report	McLean 30'	Stadium: Home Park; Attendance: 6,115; Referee: Simon Hooper

===== October =====
3 October 2015 11	Wimbledon	2–0	Barnet	Kingston upon Thames
15:00 BST	Taylor 7'; Rigg 90+4'	Report	Yiadom (yellow card) 50'; McLean (yellow card) 60'	Stadium: Kingsmeadow; Attendance: 4,068; Referee: Gavin Ward

10 October 2015 12	Barnet	1–2	Accrington Stanley	Canons Park
15:00 BST	Gash 34'; Yiadom (yellow card) 41'; Dembélé (yellow card) 46'	Report	Togwell 23' (o.g.); Pearson (yellow card) 46'; McConville 62'	Stadium: The Hive Stadium; Attendance: 2,229; Referee: Darren Deadman

17 October 2015 13	Barnet	3–1	York City	Canons Park
15:00 BST	Akinde 59'; Yiadom (yellow card) 67'; Gash 82'; Clarke 90'	Report	McCoy (yellow card) 36'; Coulson 80'; Collins (yellow card) 67'	Stadium: The Hive Stadium; Attendance: 1,767; Referee: Michael Bull

20 October 2015 14	Hartlepool United	1–1	Barnet	Hartlepool
19:45 BST	Oates 7'; Walker (yellow card) 32'; Featherstone (yellow card) 40'; Hendrie (yellow card) 83'	Report	Akinde 64'; Dembélé (yellow card) 68'	Stadium: Victoria Park; Attendance: 3,124; Referee: Kevin Wright

24 October 2015 15	Oxford United	2–3	Barnet	Oxford
15:00 BST	Skarz (yellow card) 11'; Sercombe 14', 40'; Graham (yellow card) 33'; Dunkley (yellow card) 74'	Report	Akinde (yellow card) 12' (goal) 29'; Weston 26'; Clarke 31'; Dembélé (yellow card) 34'	Stadium: Kassam Stadium; Attendance: 6,137; Referee: Darren Handley

31 October 2015 16	Barnet	2–0	Exeter City	Canons Park
15:00 GMT	Brown 34' (o.g.); Akinde (yellow card) 44'; Clarke 54'; Gambin (yellow card) 89'	Report	Brown (yellow card) 4'; Butterfield (yellow card) 31'	Stadium: The Hive Stadium; Attendance: 2,105; Referee: Ben Toner

===== November =====
14 November 2015 17	Luton Town	2–0	Barnet	Luton
15:00 GMT	Green 25' (yellow card) 79'; Lawless (yellow card) 55'; McGeehan 67'	Report		Stadium: Kenilworth Road; Attendance: 8,497; Referee: Darren England

21 November 2015 18	Barnet	0–0	Morecambe	Canons Park
15:00 GMT	McLean (yellow card) 80'	Report	Goodall (yellow card) 49'; Mullin (yellow card) 79'	Stadium: The Hive Stadium; Attendance: 1,632; Referee: Fred Graham (referee)

24 November 2015 19	Notts County	4–2	Barnet	Nottingham
19:45 GMT	Edwards 6', 78'; Stead 9'; Sheehan 73'	Report	Togwell (yellow card) 29'; Yiadom (yellow card) 33'; Batt (yellow card) 54'; Stacey (yellow card) 58'; McLean 77'; Gambin 90'	Stadium: Meadow Lane; Attendance: 3,098; Referee: Ross Joyce

28 November 2015 20	Barnet	1–3	Mansfield Town	Canons Park
15:00 GMT	Clarke (yellow card) 12' (yellow-red card) 38'; Akinde 77' (pen.); Nelson (yellow card) 90+3'	Report	Lambe 31'; Pearce (yellow card) 51'; Green 60'; Clements (yellow card) 65' (yellow-red card) 86'; Gambin 88' (o.g.)	Stadium: The Hive Stadium; Attendance: 1,775; Referee: Trevor Kettle

===== December =====
12 December 2015 21	Yeovil Town	2–2	Barnet	Yeovil
15:00 GMT	Dolan (yellow card) 90+3'; Zoko 80', 86'	Report	McLean 18', 45+4'; Yiadom (yellow card) 23'; Clarke (yellow card) 60'; Togwell (yellow card) 77'	Stadium: Huish Park; Attendance: 3,162; Referee: Graham Salisbury

19 December 2015 22	Barnet	4–2	Crawley Town	Canons Park
15:00 GMT	Dembélé 45+2', 52'; Clarke (yellow card) 45+5'; Akinde 83' (pen.); Young 85' (o.g.)	Report	Young (yellow card) 29'; Deacon (yellow card) 70'; Hancox 76'; Smith 79' (yellow card) 80'	Stadium: The Hive Stadium; Attendance: 1,888; Referee: Iain Williamson

26 December 2015 23	Barnet	2–0	Newport County	Canons Park
15:00 GMT	Akinde 54' (pen.), 89', (yellow card) 63'	Report	Donacien (yellow card) 11'; Elito (red card) 53'	Stadium: The Hive Stadium; Attendance: 1,831; Referee: Tim Robinson

28 December 2015 24	Cambridge United	2–1	Barnet	Cambridge
15:00 GMT	Berry 71'; Corr 72'	Report	Akinde (yellow card) 9', (goal) 60'; Gash (yellow card) 73'	Stadium: Abbey Stadium; Attendance: 6,003; Referee: David Webb

===== January =====
2 January 2016 25	Northampton Town	3–0	Barnet	Northampton
15:00 GMT	Hoskins 5'; Holmes 52'; Richards 60'	Report	McLean (yellow card) 17'; Champion (yellow card) 26'; N'Gala (yellow card) 82'; Yiadom (yellow card) 83'; Johnson (yellow card) 90+3'	Stadium: Sixfields Stadium; Attendance: 5,153; Referee: Ross Joyce

9 January 2016 26	Barnet	1–0	Bristol Rovers	Canons Park
15:00 GMT	Hoyte 5'; Yiadom (red card) 59'	Report	Lockyer (yellow card) 60'	Stadium: The Hive Stadium; Attendance: 2,770; Referee: Michael Bull

16 January 2016 27	Barnet	0–0	Carlisle United	Canons Park
15:00 GMT	N'Gala (yellow card) 19'; Hackett (yellow card) 28'; Sesay (yellow card) 90+1'	Report	Joyce (yellow card) 9'	Stadium: The Hive Stadium; Attendance: 2,079; Referee: Steve Martin

23 January 2016 28	Stevenage	0–0	Barnet	Stevenage
15:00 GMT	Lee (yellow card) 48'; Zanzala (yellow card) 56'; Keane (yellow card) 59'	Report	Champion (yellow card) 39'; Randall (yellow card) 63'	Stadium: Broadhall Way; Attendance: 3,801; Referee: Iain Williamson

===== February =====
13 February 2016 29	Dagenham & Redbridge	0–2	Barnet	Dagenham
15:00 GMT	Worrall (yellow card) 2'; Hawkins (yellow card) 56'	Report	Hackett (yellow card) 23'; Gambin 24'; Nelson 69'	Stadium: Victoria Road; Attendance: 1,728; Referee: Stuart Attwell

20 February 2016 30	Barnet	1–2	AFC Wimbledon	Canons Park
15:00 GMT	Stevens 87'	Report	Taylor 46'; Azeez 85'; Meades (yellow card) 90+2'	Stadium: The Hive Stadium; Attendance: 3,289; Referee: Lee Collins

23 February 2016 31	Barnet	1–0	Portsmouth	Canons Park
19:45 GMT	Champion (yellow card) 22'; Akinde 41' (pen.); Randall (yellow card) 59'; Yiadom (yellow card) 60'; Muggleton (yellow card) 66'	Report	Webster (yellow card) 90+3'	Stadium: The Hive Stadium; Attendance: 2,557; Referee: Phil Gibbs

27 February 2016 32	Accrington Stanley	2–2	Barnet	Accrington
15:00 GMT	Kee 57'; Crooks 74'	Report	Gambin 79'; Akinde 90'	Stadium: Crown Ground; Attendance: 1,416; Referee: Tony Harrington

===== March =====
1 March 2016 33	Barnet	1–0	Plymouth Argyle	Canons Park
19:45 GMT	Yiadom 69'	Report		Stadium: The Hive Stadium; Attendance: 2,209; Referee: Gavin Ward

5 March 2016 34	Barnet	1–3	Hartlepool United	Canons Park
15:00 GMT	Shomotun 11'; Nelson (yellow card) 69'; Muggleton (yellow card) 84'	Report	Hawkins 34' 40'; Thomas 62'; Magnay (yellow card) 80'	Stadium: The Hive Stadium; Attendance: 1,734; Referee: Darren Handley

8 March 2016 35	Newport County	0–3	Barnet	Newport
19:45 GMT	Holmes (yellow card) 23'; Davies (yellow card) 74'	Report	Yiadom 9'; Randall 45+2'; Akinde 69'	Stadium: Rodney Parade; Attendance: 2,032; Referee: Lee Swabey

12 March 2016 36	York City	1–1	Barnet	York
15:00 GMT	Alessandra 20'; Hendrie (yellow card) 42'	Report	Akinde 37'; Champion (yellow card) 60'; Nelson (yellow card) 75'	Stadium: Bootham Crescent; Attendance: 2,890; Referee: Mark Haywood

19 March 2016 37	Barnet	0–3	Oxford United	Canons Park
15:00 GMT		Report	O'Dowda 49' 61'; Hylton 88'	Stadium: The Hive Stadium; Attendance: 3,264; Referee: Scott Duncan

25 March 2016 38	Exeter City	1–1	Barnet	Exeter
15:00 GMT	Stockley 20'; Brown (yellow card) 67'	Report	Weston 27'	Stadium: St James Park; Attendance: 4,389; Referee: Trevor Kettle

28 March 2016 39	Barnet	2–1	Luton Town	Canons Park
15:00 BST	Gambin 49'; Pearson (yellow card) 71'; Weston (yellow card) 78'; Sesay (yellow card) 81'; Ngala (yellow card) 84'; Akinde 90+6' (pen.), (yellow card) 90+7'	Report	Smith (yellow card) 8'; McGeehan 85'; Cuthbert (yellow card) 90+5'; Sheehan (yellow card) 90+9'	Stadium: The Hive Stadium; Attendance: 4,008; Referee: Graham Salisbury

===== April =====
2 April 2016 40	Morecambe	4–2	Barnet	Morecambe
15:00 BST	Miller 1', 8' (pen.); Kenyon 48'; Molyneux (yellow card) 74'; Stockton 88'	Report	Yiadom (yellow card) 62'; Gash 70', 90+3'; Muggleton (yellow card) 72'	Stadium: Globe Arena; Attendance: 1,175; Referee: David Coote

9 April 2016 41	Barnet	3–0	Leyton Orient	Canons Park
15:00 BST	Weston (yellow card) 14'; Akinde 25', 57'; Togwell 49', (yellow card) 56'	Report	Palmer (yellow card) 72'	Stadium: The Hive Stadium; Attendance: 3,401; Referee: Keith Stroud

16 April 2016 42	Wycombe Wanderers	1–1	Barnet	High Wycombe
15:00 BST	Hayes 58'	Report	Yiadom (yellow card) 67', (goal) 72'; Dembélé (yellow card) 86'	Stadium: Adams Park; Attendance: 3,715; Referee: Gavin Ward

19 April 2016 43	Barnet	3–1	Notts County	Canons Park
19:45 BST	Akinde 47' (pen.); Randall (yellow card) 55', (goal) 57'; Yiadom 63'	Report	Stead 6' (pen.); Audel (yellow card) 67'; Hewitt (yellow card) 86'	Stadium: The Hive Stadium; Attendance: 1,322; Referee: Oliver Langford

23 April 2016 44	Mansfield Town	1–1	Barnet	Mansfield
15:00 BST	Dieseruvwe 30'	Report	Akinde 6'	Stadium: Field Mill; Attendance: 2,573; Referee: Andy Haines

30 April 2016 45	Barnet	3–4	Yeovil Town	Canons Park
15:00 BST	Gash 22'; Akinde 52' (pen.) 62' (yellow card) 78'	Report	Lacey (yellow card) 52'; Dolan 55'; Smith 63'; Zoko 76'; Cornick 90+5'	Stadium: The Hive Stadium; Attendance: 2,379; Referee: Seb Stockbridge

===== May =====
7 May 2016 46	Crawley Town	0–3	Barnet	Crawley
15:00 BST	Bawling (yellow card) 28'; Tomlin (yellow card) 50'; Edwards (yellow card) 66'; Sutherland (yellow card) 70'	Report	Johnson 39'; Fonguck (yellow card) 47'; Akinde 78' 90'	Stadium: Broadfield Stadium; Attendance: 2,293; Referee: David Coote

=== FA Cup ===
7 November 2015 First round	Barnet	2–0	Blackpool	Canons Park
15:00 GMT	Champion 36'; Gash 41'	Report	Cameron (yellow card) 27'; Herron (yellow card) 30'; Aldred (yellow card) 67'	Stadium: The Hive Stadium; Attendance: 1,869; Referee: Kevin Johnson

5 December 2015 Second round	Barnet	0–1	Newport County	Canons Park
15:00 GMT	Dembélé (yellow card) 48'; Yiadom (yellow card) 68'	Report	Boden 59'; Partridge (yellow card) 30'	Stadium: The Hive Stadium; Attendance: 1,767; Referee: Dean Whitestone

=== League Cup ===
On 16 June 2015, the first round draw was made, Barnet were drawn away against Millwall. In the second round, Barnet drew Wolverhampton Wanderers away.

11 August 2015 First round	Millwall	1–2 (a.e.t.)	Barnet	Bermondsey
19:45 BST	Martin (yellow card) 53'; Morison 76'	Report	Akinde 11' (pen.); Champion (yellow card) 82'; Yiadom 102'	Stadium: The Den; Attendance: 4,454; Referee: Andy Madley

25 August 2015 Second round	Wolverhampton Wanderers	2–1	Barnet	Wolverhampton
19:45 BST	Enobakhare 3' (yellow card) 4'; Saville (yellow card) 19'; Ojo 58'; Deslandes (yellow card) 68'	Report	Dembélé 76'; Tomlinson (yellow card) 85'	Stadium: Molineux; Attendance: 7,384; Referee: Mark Heywood

=== Football League Trophy ===
On 8 August 2015, live on Soccer AM the draw for the first round of the Football League Trophy was drawn by Toni Duggan and Alex Scott.

1 September 2015 First round	Yeovil Town	1–0	Barnet	Yeovil
19:45 BST	Wakefield (yellow card) 34'; Dembélé 37' (o.g.); Lacey (yellow card) 61'; Gibbons (yellow card) 86'	Report	Muggleton (yellow card) 63'; Dembélé (yellow card) 75'; Stevens (yellow card) 76'	Stadium: Huish Park; Attendance: 1,203; Referee: Tim Robinson

=== Middlesex Senior Cup ===
On the Middlesex FA website the second round details were announced, Barnet will face Staines Town.

17 November 2015 Second round	Staines Town	4–1	Barnet	Staines-upon-Thames
19:45 BST				Stadium: Wheatsheaf Park
