= Dwight Pascal =

English footballer

Personal information
- Full name: Dwight Cal Pascal
- Date of birth: 7 March 2001 (age 25)
- Place of birth: Hackney, England
- Position: Defender

Youth career
- Barnet

Senior career*
Years	Team	Apps	(Gls)
2016–2019	Barnet	1	(0)
2019–2020	Potters Bar Town	16	(0)
2020–2021	Barnet	3	(0)
2021–2022	Potters Bar Town	37	(2)
2022–2023	Kingstonian	30	(1)
2023–2024	Dulwich Hamlet	7	(0)
2024	Potters Bar Town	14	(0)
2024	Dartford	0	(0)
2024–2025	Walthamstow	30	(0)
- * Club domestic league appearances and goals as of 19:30, 19 October 2025 (UTC)

Dwight Cal Pascal (born 7 March 2001) is an English footballer who plays as a defender. He is a free agent.

== Career ==
Pascal made his debut for Barnet when he started an EFL Trophy game against Peterborough United on 8 November 2016. Aged 15, he became Barnet's youngest ever player, beating a record previously set by Mathew Stevens. Pascal continued with the academy to under-18 level and played two further first-team games, but was released by the Bees following the conclusion of his scholarship at the end of the 2018–19 season. He joined Potters Bar Town in November 2019. He played 19 games for the Scholars before re-joining Barnet on 1 October 2020. He left the Bees again at the end of the season, before joining Potters Bar again in time for the following season. Pascal joined Kingstonian for the 2022-23 season.

== Career statistics ==
As of May 2025

Club	Season	League			FA Cup		League Cup		Other		Total	
Club	Season	Division	Apps	Goals	Apps	Goals	Apps	Goals	Apps	Goals	Apps	Goals
Barnet	2016–17	League Two	0	0	0	0	0	0	1 (Note: Appearance in the EFL Trophy)	0	1	0
Barnet	2017–18	League Two	1	0	0	0	0	0	1	0	2	0
Barnet	2018–19	National League	0	0	0	0	0	0	0	0	0	0
Barnet	Barnet total		1	0	0	0	0	0	2	0	3	0
Potters Bar Town	2019–20	Isthmian League Premier Division	16	0	0	0	0	0	3 (Note: Two appearances in Herts Senior Cup, one appearance in Alan Turvey Trophy)	0	19	0
Barnet	2020–21	National League	3	0	2	0	0	0	1 (Note: Appearance in the FA Trophy)	0	6	0
Potters Bar Town	2021–22	Isthmian League Premier Division	37	2	0	0	0	0	2	0	39	2
Kingstonian	2022–23	Isthmian League Premier Division	30	1	1	0	0	0	2 (Note: Appearance in the Surrey Senior Cup)	0	33	1
Dulwich Hamlet	2023–24	Isthmian League Premier Division	7	0	0	0	0	0	2 (Note: Appearance in the London Senior Cup) (Note: Appearance in the Velocity Cup)	0	9	0
Potters Bar Town	2023–24	Isthmian League Premier Division	14	0	0	0	0	0	1 (Note: Appearance in the Hertfordshire Senior Cup)	0	15	0
Dartford	2024–25	Isthmian League Premier Division	0	0	0	0	0	0	0	0	0	0
Walthamstow	2024–25	Isthmian League North Division	30	0	0	0	0	0	1 (Note: Appearance in the Essex Senior Cup)	0	31	0
Career total			138	3	3	0	0	0	14	0	158	3
