= Darnell Smith =

English footballer

Personal information
- Full name: Darnell Tyrick Smith
- Date of birth: 24 March 1999 (age 27)
- Place of birth: Hackney, England
- Position: Centre-back

Youth career
- –2017: Barnet

Senior career*
Years	Team	Apps	(Gls)
2016–2019	Barnet	0	(0)
2016	→ Staines Town (loan)	4	(0)
2017	→ Three Bridges (loan)	4	(0)
2017	→ Hungerford Town (loan)	2	(0)
2019	→ Wingate & Finchley (loan)	3	(0)
- * Club domestic league appearances and goals as of 20:08, 28 March 2019 (UTC)

Darnell Tyrick Smith (born 24 March 1999) is an English footballer who most recently played for Barnet.

== Career ==
Smith signed a two-year scholarship with Barnet in 2015. After loan spells at Staines Town and Three Bridges, Smith signed a professional contract with the Bees in April 2017. Smith made his debut for Barnet on 29 August 2017 against AFC Wimbledon in the EFL Trophy. Smith joined Hungerford Town on loan on 10 November 2017. Smith joined Wingate & Finchley on loan in March 2019. He was released by the Bees at the end of the 2018–19 season.

== Career statistics ==
As of 28 March 2019

Club	Season	League			FA Cup		League Cup		Other		Total	
Club	Season	Division	Apps	Goals	Apps	Goals	Apps	Goals	Apps	Goals	Apps	Goals
Barnet	2017–18	League Two	0	0	0	0	0	0	1 (Note: Appearances in the EFL Trophy)	0	1	0
Staines Town (loan)	2016–17	Isthmian Premier	4	0	0	0	0	0	0	0	4	0
Three Bridges (loan)	2016–17	Isthmian D1 South	4	0	0	0	0	0	0	0	4	0
Hungerford Town (loan)	2017–18	National League South	2	0	0	0	0	0	1 (Note: Appearances in the FA Trophy)	0	3	0
Wingate & Finchley (loan)	2018–19	Isthmian Premier	3	0	0	0	0	0	0	0	3	0
Career total			13	0	0	0	0	0	2	0	15	0
