= Tom Champion =

English footballer (born 1986)

Personal information
- Full name: Thomas Matthew Champion
- Date of birth: 15 May 1986 (age 40)
- Place of birth: Barnet, England
- Height: 1.90 m (6 ft 3 in)
- Position: Midfielder

Team information
- Current team: Lewes

Youth career
- –2004: Watford

Senior career*
| Years | Team | Apps | (Gls) |
| 2004–2005 | Barnet | 1 | (0) |
| 2005 | → Wealdstone (loan) | 0 | (0) |
| 2005–2010 | Bishop's Stortford | 114 | (4) |
| 2010 | Braintree Town | 19 | (0) |
| 2010–2013 | Dartford | 114 | (5) |
| 2013–2015 | Cambridge United | 81 | (1) |
| 2015–2017 | Barnet | 52 | (1) |
| 2016 | → Lincoln City (loan) | 5 | (0) |
| 2017–2021 | Boreham Wood | 146 | (4) |
| 2021–2022 | Woking | 36 | (0) |
| 2022–2023 | Lewes | 39 | (3) |
| Total | | 613 | (18) |
- * Club domestic league appearances and goals as of 21:45, 7 May 2022 (UTC)

Thomas Matthew Champion (born 15 May 1986) is an English former professional and semi-professional footballer who last played for Lewes.

== Career ==
=== Early years ===
Born in London, Champion began his professional career with Barnet, after playing for Watford's youth setup. In February 2005, he joined Wealdstone on loan for a month. Champion subsequently returned to the Bees, and joined Bishop's Stortford in July.

=== Dartford ===
In the 2010 summer, after appearing regularly with Bishop's Stortford (and with a short stint at Braintree Town), Champion joined Dartford. He featured regularly for the side, also being an ever-present figure during the promotion campaign to the Conference Premier, featuring in 39 matches.

=== Cambridge United ===
On 8 May 2013 Champion joined Cambridge United, alongside Dartford teammate Tom Bonner. He appeared in all league matches during the season, helping the club return to League Two. On 8 August 2014 Champion played in Cambridge's first match back in League Two, starting in a 1–0 home win against Plymouth Argyle.

=== Barnet ===
Champion rejoined Barnet on a two-year deal in May 2015. He scored his first goal for the club in a 2–0 win during an FA Cup first round tie against Blackpool. Champion was made available for a free transfer at the end of the 2015–16 season, and joined Lincoln City on a 93-day loan on 12 September 2016. A month later his loan was cancelled early by mutual consent. Champion was released by the Bees at the end of the 2016–17 season. In total, he played 57 times, scoring two goals.

=== Boreham Wood ===
Champion joined Boreham Wood on a one-year deal in June 2017.

=== Woking ===
On 8 June 2021, Champion joined fellow National League side, Woking on a one-year deal. On 21 August 2021, Champion made his Woking debut during their 2–1 away victory over Wealdstone, replacing Max Kretzschmar in the 74th minute. He went onto feature thirty-eight times in all competitions before leaving at the end of his contract in July 2022.

=== Lewes ===
On 8 August 2022, it was announced that Champion had joined Lewes ahead of the 2022–23 campaign. He announced his retirement from football after the 22/23 season on April 6, 2023, and played his final game on April 22, in a 3-1 win against Canvey Island.

== Career statistics ==
As of match played 7 May 2022

| Club | Season | League | | | FA Cup | | League Cup | | Other | | Total | |
| Club | Season | Division | Apps | Goals | Apps | Goals | Apps | Goals | Apps | Goals | Apps | Goals |
|---|---|---|---|---|---|---|---|---|---|---|---|---|
| Dartford | 2010–11 | Conference South | 36 | 2 | 4 | 0 | — | | 2 (Note: Appearances in FA Trophy) | 1 | 42 | 3 |
| Dartford | 2011–12 | Conference South | 36 | 2 | 1 | 0 | — | | 7 (Note: Four appearances in FA Trophy, three in Conference South play-offs) | 0 | 44 | 2 |
| Dartford | 2012–13 | Conference Premier | 42 | 1 | 2 | 0 | — | | 7 | 0 | 51 | 1 |
| Dartford | Total | | 114 | 5 | 7 | 0 | — | | 16 | 1 | 137 | 6 |
| Cambridge United | 2013–14 | Conference Premier | 43 | 1 | 4 | 0 | — | | 9 (Note: Six appearances in FA Trophy, three in Conference Premier play-offs) | 0 | 56 | 1 |
| Cambridge United | 2014–15 | League Two | 38 | 0 | 6 | 0 | 1 | 0 | 1 (Note: Appearances in Football League Trophy) | 0 | 46 | 0 |
| Cambridge United | Total | | 81 | 1 | 10 | 0 | 1 | 0 | 10 | 0 | 102 | 1 |
| Barnet | 2015–16 | League Two | 26 | 0 | 1 | 1 | 2 | 0 | 1 | 0 | 30 | 1 |
| Barnet | 2016–17 | League Two | 26 | 1 | 1 | 0 | 0 | 0 | 0 | 0 | 27 | 1 |
| Barnet | Total | | 52 | 1 | 2 | 1 | 2 | 0 | 1 | 0 | 57 | 2 |
| Lincoln City (loan) | 2016–17 | National League | 5 | 0 | 0 | 0 | — | | 0 | 0 | 5 | 0 |
| Boreham Wood | 2017–18 | National League | 42 | 1 | 3 | 0 | — | | 7 (Note: Four appearances in FA Trophy, three in National League play-offs) | 0 | 52 | 1 |
| Boreham Wood | 2018–19 | National League | 44 | 1 | 2 | 0 | — | | 2 | 0 | 48 | 1 |
| Boreham Wood | 2019–20 | National League | 34 | 1 | 1 | 0 | — | | 3 (Note: One appearance in FA Trophy, two in National League play-offs) | 0 | 38 | 1 |
| Boreham Wood | 2020–21 | National League | 26 | 1 | 3 | 0 | — | | 0 | 0 | 29 | 1 |
| Boreham Wood | Total | | 146 | 4 | 9 | 0 | 0 | 0 | 12 | 0 | 167 | 4 |
| Woking | 2021–22 | National League | 36 | 0 | 1 | 0 | — | | 1 | 0 | 38 | 0 |
| Lewes | 2022–23 | Isthmian League Premier Division | 0 | 0 | 0 | 0 | — | | 0 | 0 | 0 | 0 |
| Career total | | | 434 | 11 | 29 | 1 | 3 | 0 | 40 | 1 | 506 | 13 |

== Honours ==
Cambridge United

- FA Trophy: 2013–14
