= Shane Cojocarel =

English-born Romanian footballer

Shane Cojocărel
Personal information
- Full name: Shane Vasilică Cojocărel
- Date of birth: 20 March 1997 (age 29)
- Place of birth: Camden, England
- Height: 5 ft 7 in (1.70 m)
- Position: Attacking midfielder

Youth career
- 2011–2012: Queens Park Rangers
- 2012–2015: Barnet

Senior career*
Years	Team	Apps	(Gls)
2015–2018	Barnet	3	(0)
2015	→ Billericay Town (loan)	11	(2)
2015–2016	→ Northwood (loan)	3	(0)
2016	→ Metropolitan Police (loan)	5	(0)
2016	→ Billericay Town (loan)	5	(0)
2017	→ Merstham (loan)	2	(0)
2018	→ Horsham (loan)	4	(3)
2018	Maldon & Tiptree	17	(4)
2019–2020	Cheshunt	13	(6)
2020	FC Romania	1	(0)
2023	FC Romania	4	(0)
2023	Northwood	10	(3)
2024	Potters Bar Town	15	(2)

International career
2013	Romania U16	2	(0)
- * Club domestic league appearances and goals as of 21:11, 17 June 2024 (UTC)

Shane Vasilică Cojocărel (born 20 March 1997) is an English-born Romanian professional footballer who last played for Potters Bar Town.

== Career ==
Cojocarel signed a two-year scholarship with Barnet in 2013, and signed a one-year professional contract in the summer of 2015.

In 2015–16, Cojocarel had loan spells with Billericay Town and Northwood.

Cojocarel signed a new contract with the Bees at the end of the 2015–16 season. In 2015–16, he had loan spells with Metropolitan Police, a second spell at Billericay, and Merstham, before making his English Football League debut for the Bees as a substitute against Crawley Town on 11 March 2017. He joined Horsham on loan in March 2018. He was released by Barnet at the end of the 2017–18 season. He joined Maldon & Tiptree in August 2018, before joining Cheshunt in March 2019 and helping the club to promotion from the Isthmian League South Central division, scoring twice in the play-off final against Bracknell Town. Cojocarel joined FC Romania in October 2020.

In February 2023 Shane rejoined former club Northwood. He joined Potters Bar Town in January 2024.

== International career ==
Cojocarel was capped by Romania U-16 in 2013, coming on twice as a substitute in two games against Austria U-16 on 21 and 23 May.

== Career statistics ==
As of 25 February 2023

Club	Season	League			FA Cup		League Cup		Other		Total	
Club	Season	Division	Apps	Goals	Apps	Goals	Apps	Goals	Apps	Goals	Apps	Goals
Barnet	2015–16	League Two	0	0	0	0	0	0	0	0	0	0
Barnet	2016–17	League Two	3	0	0	0	0	0	0	0	3	0
Barnet	2017–18	League Two	0	0	0	0	0	0	0	0	0	0
Barnet	Barnet total		3	0	0	0	0	0	0	0	3	0
Billericay Town (loan)	2015–16	Isthmian League Premier Division	11	2	0	0	0	0	0	0	11	2
Northwood (loan)	2015–16	SFL Division One Central	3	0	0	0	0	0	0	0	3	0
Metropolitan Police (loan)	2016–17	Isthmian League Premier Division	5	0	0	0	0	0	1	0	6	0
Billericay Town (loan)	2016–17	Isthmian League Premier Division	5	0	0	0	0	0	0	0	5	0
Merstham (loan)	2016–17	Isthmian League Premier Division	2	0	0	0	0	0	0	0	2	0
Horsham (loan)	2017–18	Isthmian League Division One South	4	3	0	0	0	0	0	0	4	3
Maldon & Tiptree	2018–19	Isthmian League North Division	17	4	1	0	0	0	5	0	23	4
Cheshunt	2018–19	Isthmian League South Central Division	8	6	0	0	0	0	2	2	10	8
Cheshunt	2019–20	Isthmian League Premier Division	5	0	1	0	0	0	2	0	8	0
Cheshunt	2020–21	Isthmian League Premier Division	0	0	2	0	0	0	0	0	2	0
Cheshunt	Cheshunt total		13	6	3	0	0	0	4	2	20	8
FC Romania	2020–21	Isthmian League South Central Division	1	0	0	0	0	0	0	0	1	0
FC Romania	2022–23	SFL Division One Central	4	0	0	0	0	0	0	0	4	0
Northwood	2022–23	Isthmian League South Central Division	1	0	0	0	0	0	1	0	2	0
Career total			69	15	4	0	0	0	10	2	83	17
