= Tom Day (footballer) =

English footballer

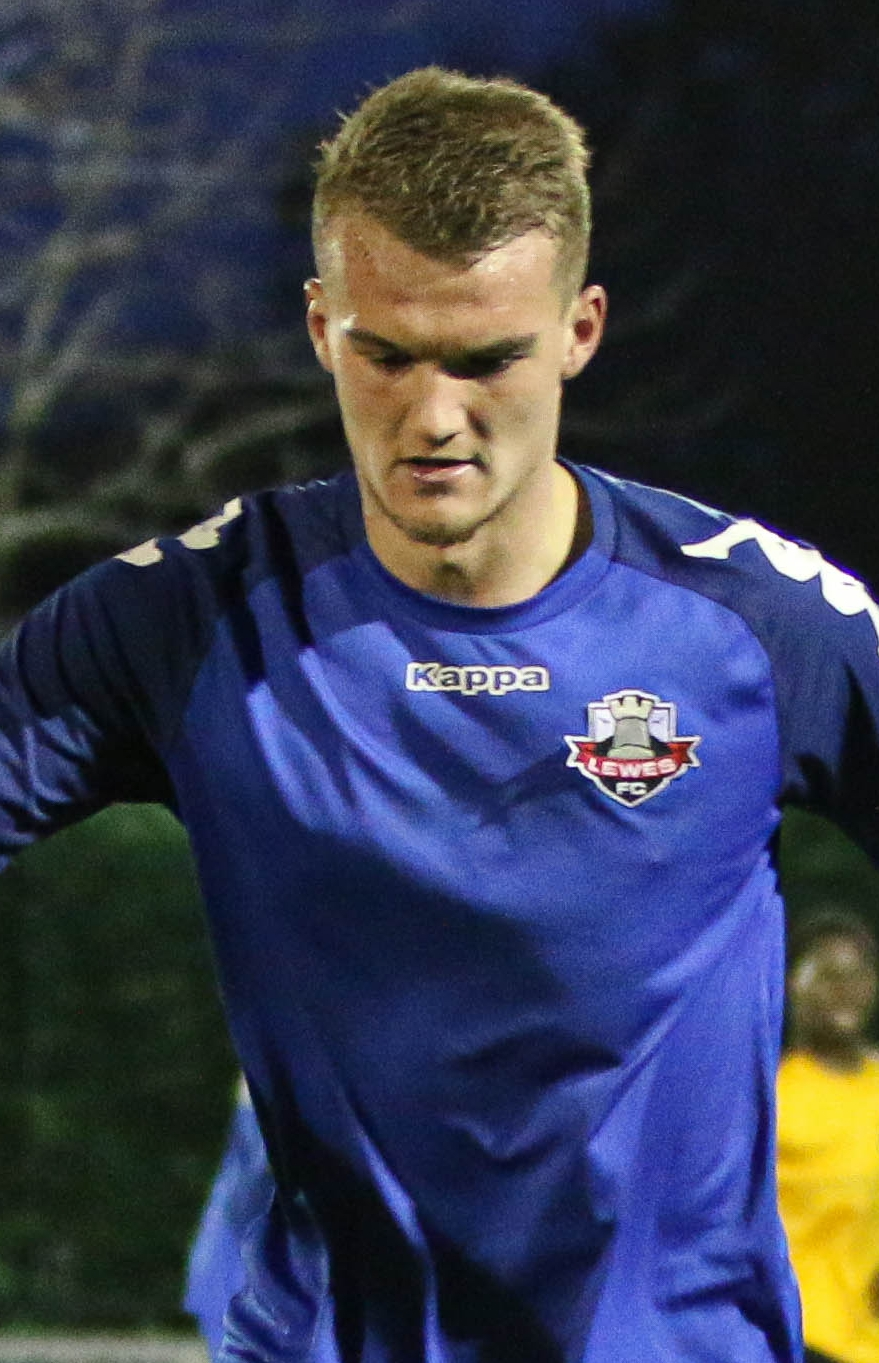
- Day playing for Lewes in December 2019

Personal information
- Full name: Thomas Steven Day
- Date of birth: 24 October 1997 (age 29)
- Place of birth: Redhill, England
- Position: Defender

Youth career
- –2015: Crystal Palace
- 2015–2016: Barnet

Senior career*
Years	Team	Apps	(Gls)
2016–2018	Barnet	1	(0)
2016–2017	→ Staines Town (loan)	28	(0)
2017–2018	→ Hemel Hempstead Town (loan)	7	(0)
2018	Hemel Hempstead Town	1	(0)
2018–2019	Eastbourne Borough	2	(0)
2018–2019	→ Lewes (loan)	29	(2)
2019–2020	Lewes	31	(0)
2020–2023	Horsham	65	(5)
- * Club domestic league appearances and goals as of 21:26, 26 November 2023 (UTC)

Thomas Steven Day (born 24 October 1997) is an English footballer.

== Career ==
Day played youth football for Crystal Palace, where he signed a two-year scholarship in 2014. He left after one year of his scholarship and joined Barnet as a second-year scholar for the 2015–16 season. He made his Football League debut when he came on as a substitute against Crawley Town on the final day of the 2015–16 season. Day joined Staines Town on loan for a month in September 2016 – this loan was later extended beyond January 2017. Day joined Hemel Hempstead Town on loan in September 2017. This loan was extended until the end of the season in November. He was released by Barnet at the end of the 2017–18 season. After playing for Hemel at the start of the following season he then joined Eastbourne Borough. In September 2018 he joined Lewes on a one-month loan. This was later extended for the entire season and he joined the Rooks permanently the following summer. He joined Horsham for the 2020–21 season.

== Career statistics ==
As of match played 19 September 2020

Club	Season	League			FA Cup		League Cup		Other		Total	
Club	Season	Division	Apps	Goals	Apps	Goals	Apps	Goals	Apps	Goals	Apps	Goals
Barnet	2015–16	League Two	1	0	0	0	0	0	0	0	1	0
Staines Town (loan)	2016–17	Isthmian League Premier Division	28	0	0	0	―		0	0	28	0
Hemel Hempstead Town (loan)	2017–18	National League South	7	0	1	0	―		1 (Note: Appearance in Herts Charity Cup)	0	8	0
Hemel Hempstead Town	2018–19	National League South	1	0	0	0	―		0	0	1	0
Eastbourne Borough	2018–19	National League South	2	0	1	0	―		0	0	3	0
Lewes (loan)	2018–19	Isthmian League Premier Division	29	2	0	0	―		3	0	32	2
Lewes	2019–20	Isthmian League Premier Division	31	0	3	0	―		5	0	39	0
Horsham	2020–21	Isthmian League Premier Division	1	0	0	0	―		0	0	1	0
Career total			100	2	5	0	0	0	8	0	116	2
