= Elliott Johnson (footballer) =

English footballer

Personal information
- Full name: Elliott George Johnson
- Date of birth: 17 August 1994 (age 32)
- Place of birth: Hendon, England
- Height: 5 ft 9 in (1.75 m)
- Position: Left-back

Team information
- Current team: Eastbourne Borough
- Number: 3

Youth career
- –2010: Barnet

Senior career*
Years	Team	Apps	(Gls)
2010–2020	Barnet	235	(4)
2020–2024	Dagenham & Redbridge	114	(0)
2024–2026	Hednesford Town	49	(4)
2026–	Eastbourne Borough	14	(0)
- * Club domestic league appearances and goals as of 23:31, 21 November 2026 (UTC)

Elliott George Johnson (born 17 August 1994) is an English professional footballer who plays as a left-back for Isthmian League Premier Division club Eastbourne Borough.

== Career ==
Johnson was born in Hendon, London. He was first registered as a first-team player at Barnet as a 16-year-old in October 2010, and featured on the bench in several games in the 2010–11 and 2011–12 seasons. He signed his first professional contract in May 2012, and finally made his debut when he started a League Two match at home to Torquay United on 6 November 2012. He scored his first goal for Barnet in a 3–2 defeat at Accrington Stanley on 16 March 2013.

Johnson was part of the team that won the Conference Premier in 2014–15 and was Barnet's first choice left back for eight seasons. He left the club at the end of the 2019–20 season, after 270 appearances, scoring five goals.

Johnson signed for Dagenham & Redbridge on 11 August 2020.

On 15 June 2024, Johnson joined Northern Premier League Division One West side Hednesford Town.

On 26 May 2026, Johnson agreed to join Isthmian League club Eastbourne Borough, upon the expiration of his Hednesford contract.

== Career statistics ==
As of match played 21 November 2026

Appearances and goals by club, season and competition
Club	Season	League			FA Cup		League Cup		Other		Total	
Club	Season	Division	Apps	Goals	Apps	Goals	Apps	Goals	Apps	Goals	Apps	Goals
Barnet	2010–11	League Two	0	0	0	0	0	0	0	0	0	0
Barnet	2011–12	League Two	0	0	0	0	0	0	0	0	0	0
Barnet	2012–13	League Two	26	1	0	0	0	0	0	0	26	1
Barnet	2013–14	Conference Premier	30	0	0	0	—		1 (Note: Appearance(s) in FA Trophy)	0	31	0
Barnet	2014–15	Conference Premier	42	1	3	0	—		0	0	45	1
Barnet	2015–16	League Two	41	1	2	0	2	0	1 (Note: Appearance(s) in Football League Trophy)	0	46	1
Barnet	2016–17	League Two	36	0	1	0	1	0	2 (Note: Appearance(s) in EFL Trophy)	0	40	0
Barnet	2017–18	League Two	2	0	0	0	1	0	0	0	3	0
Barnet	2018–19	National League	38	1	7	1	—		4	0	49	2
Barnet	2019–20	National League	19	0	3	0	—		7 (Note: Five appearances in FA Trophy, two appearances in National League playoffs)	0	29	0
Barnet	Total		235	4	16	1	4	0	15	0	270	5
Dagenham & Redbridge	2020–21	National League	37	0	3	0	—		2	0	42	0
Dagenham & Redbridge	2021–22	National League	28	0	1	0	—		4	0	33	0
Dagenham & Redbridge	2022–23	National League	24	0	1	0	—		2	0	27	0
Dagenham & Redbridge	2023–24	National League	25	0	0	0	—		1	0	26	0
Dagenham & Redbridge	Total		114	0	5	0	—		9	0	128	0
Hednesford Town	2024–25	NPL Division One West	36	3	10	1	—		7 (Note: Two appearances in Northern Premier League Division One West play-offs, two appearances in FA Trophy, two appearances in Walsall Senior Cup, one appearance in Birmingham Senior Cup)	0	53	4
Hednesford Town	2025–26	NPL Premier Division	13	1	2	0	—		2 (Note: One appearance in Staffordshire Senior Cup, one appearance in Birmingham Senior Cup)	0	17	1
Hednesford Town	Total		49	4	12	1	—		9	0	70	5
Eastbourne Borough	2026–27	IL Premier Division	14	0	2	0	—		4 (Note: Two appearances in FA Trophy, two appearances in Sussex Senior Cup)	0	20	0
Career total			412	8	35	2	4	0	37	0	488	10

== Honours ==
Barnet

- Conference Premier: 2014–15

Hednesford Town

- Northern Premier League Division One West play-offs: 2025
- Northern Premier League Play Offs: 2025-26
