= Jamie Stephens =

English footballer

Personal information
- Full name: Jamie Stephens
- Date of birth: 25 August 1993 (age 33)
- Place of birth: Wotton-under-Edge, England
- Height: 1.88 m (6 ft 2 in)
- Position: Goalkeeper

Youth career
- 2006–2007: Forest Green Rovers
- 2007–2010: Swindon Town
- 2010–2011: Liverpool

Senior career*
Years	Team	Apps	(Gls)
2011–2013	Liverpool	0	(0)
2013	→ Airbus UK Broughton (loan)	13	(0)
2013–2015	Newport County	9	(0)
2014	→ Gloucester City (loan)	4	(0)
2015–2018	Barnet	58	(0)
2020	Northwood	2	(0)
- * Club domestic league appearances and goals as of 16:03, 30 September 2020 (UTC)

James Edward Stephens (born 25 August 1993) is a former English football goalkeeper who now works as a goalkeeping coach for National League North club Bedford Town.

== Career ==
Stephens started his career in the youth set up at Forest Green Rovers but moved to Swindon Town where his impressive showings brought him to the attention of Liverpool who signed him up for their academy in April 2010. He spent the 2012–13 season on loan at Airbus UK Broughton.

He was released by Liverpool in July 2013 and joined Newport County. He made his Football League debut for Newport in a League Two clash with Accrington Stanley on 3 August 2013. He made his League Cup debut in Newport's first round 3–1 win at Brighton & Hove Albion on 7 August 2013. In September 2014 Stephens was due to join Brackley Town on loan but issues with international clearance prevented the move to Brackley and he subsequently joined Gloucester City on loan in October 2014.

He was released by Newport in May 2015 at the end of his contract. On 6 August 2015, he signed for Barnet on a one-year deal. He won Barnet Player of the Year 2016–17, as well as the Fan's Player of the Year Award. He was released by Barnet at the end of the 2017–18 season.

His next appearance would be a Middlesex Senior Cup tie for Northwood in January 2020.

== Coaching career ==
=== Bedford Town ===
In July 2025, Stephens joined National League North side Bedford Town as a goalkeeping coach.

== Career statistics ==
As of 25 February 2020

Appearances and goals by club, season and competition
Club	Season	League			FA Cup		League Cup		Other		Total	
Club	Season	Division	Apps	Goals	Apps	Goals	Apps	Goals	Apps	Goals	Apps	Goals
Liverpool	2011-12	Premier League	0	0	0	0	0	0	0	0	0	0
Liverpool	2012-13	Premier League	0	0	0	0	0	0	0	0	0	0
Liverpool	Liverpool total		0	0	0	0	0	0	0	0	0	0
Airbus UK Broughton (loan)	2012–13	Welsh Premier League	13	0	2	0	0	0	0	0	15	0
Newport County	2013-14	League Two	2	0	0	0	1	0	3 (Note: Appearances in the Football League Trophy)	0	6	0
Newport County	2014-15	League Two	7	0	0	0	0	0	0	0	7	0
Newport County	Newport total		9	0	0	0	1	0	3	0	13	0
Gloucester City (loan)	2014–15	Conference North	4	0	1	0	0	0	0	0	5	0
Barnet	2015-16	League Two	29	0	2	0	1	0	1	0	33	0
Barnet	2016-17	League Two	18	0	1	0	0	0	1	0	20	0
Barnet	2017-18	League Two	11	0	0	0	1	0	0	0	12	0
Barnet	Barnet total		58	0	3	0	2	0	2	0	65	0
Northwood	2019–20	Isthmian League South Central	2	0	0	0	0	0	1 (Note: Appearances in the Middlesex Senior Cup)	0	3	0
Career total			75	0	8	0	3	0	6	0	89	0
