= National League South =

English football league

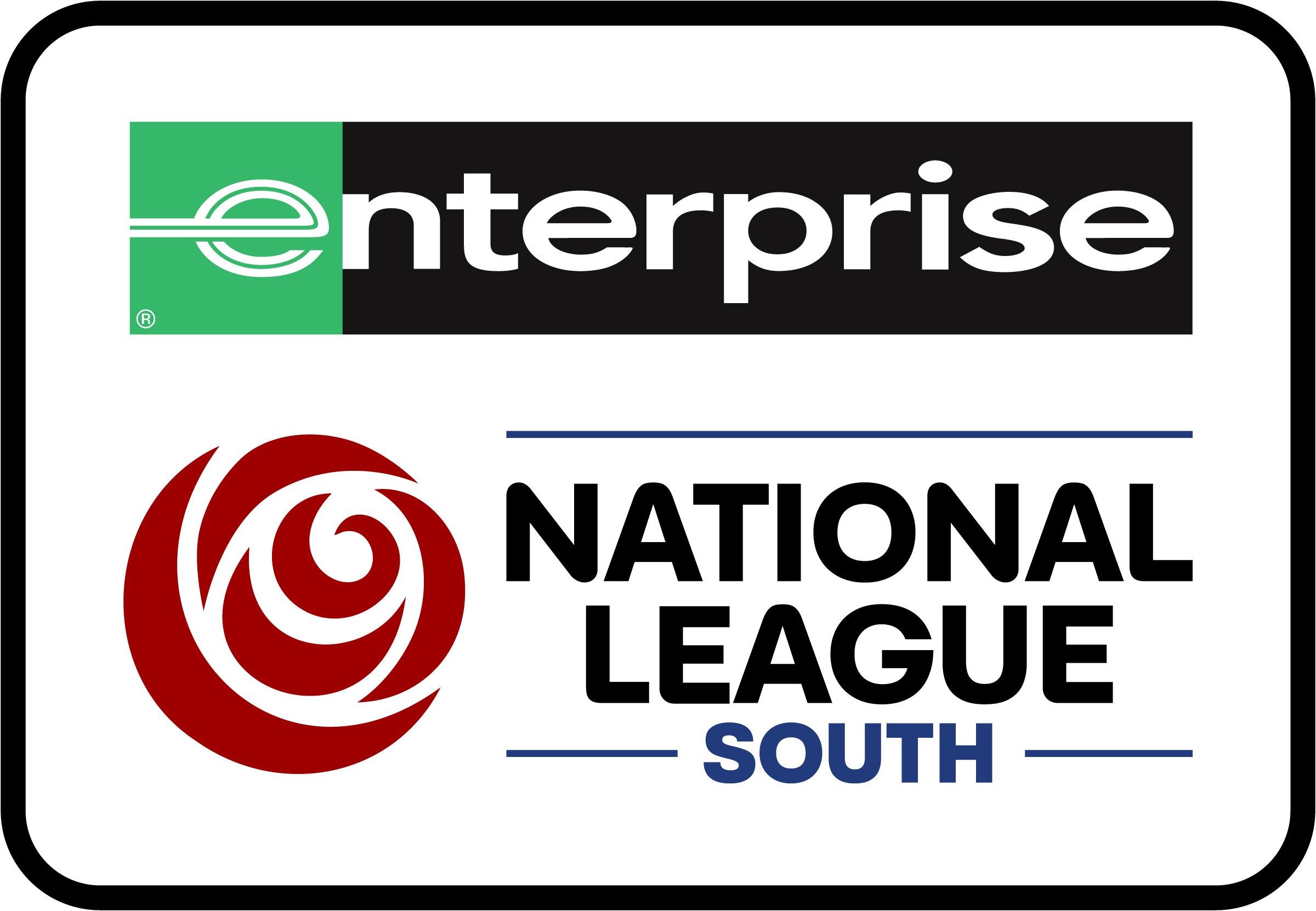
- Founded: 2004
- Country: England
- Number of clubs: 24
- Level on pyramid: 6 Step 2 (National League System)
- Promotion to: National League
- Relegation to: Isthmian League Premier Division; Southern Football League Premier Division Central or South
- Domestic cup(s): FA Cup; FA Trophy
- International cup(s): Europa League (via FA Cup)
- Current champions: Worthing (1st title) (2025-26)
- Most championships: 21 Teams (1 title)
- Top scorer: Shaun Jeffers (129)
- Website: National League
- Current: 2026–27 National League South

The National League South is a professional Association football league in England. National League South is the second division of the National Leagues and step 2 of the NLS and sixth-highest tier overall in the English football league system, after the Premier League, the EFL leagues and the National League and is contested by 24 clubs.

National League South includes teams from the South East, London, and the South West, as well as teams from Essex. The National League South was introduced in 2004 as part of a major restructuring of the National League System. Each year the champion of the league is automatically promoted to the National League. A second promotion place goes to the winner of a play-off involving the teams finishing in second to seventh place (expanded from four to six teams in the 2017–18 season). The three bottom clubs were relegated to Step 3 leagues.

== Current member clubs, 2026–27 ==
The current member clubs for the 2026–27 season are as follows:

Division of Level 6 teams by English Counties (2022–23)

| Club | Finishing position 2025–26 |
|---|---|
| AFC Totton | 12th |
| Billericay Town | 3rd in Isthmian League (promoted) |
| Braintree Town | 23rd in National League (relegated) |
| Chelmsford City | 10th |
| Chesham United | 11th |
| Dagenham & Redbridge | 13th |
| Dorking Wanderers | 4th |
| Dover Athletic | 20th |
| Ebbsfleet United | 9th |
| Farnborough | 19th |
| Farnham Town | 2nd in Southern League (promoted) |
| Folkestone Invicta | 1st in Isthmian League (promoted) |
| Hampton & Richmond Borough | 18th |
| Hemel Hempstead Town | 5th |
| Horsham | 15th |
| Maidenhead United | 7th |
| Maidstone United | 8th |
| Salisbury | 17th |
| Slough Town | 16th |
| Tonbridge Angels | 14th |
| Torquay United | 3rd |
| Truro City | 24th in National League (relegated) |
| Walton & Hersham | 1st in Southern League (promoted) |
| Weston-super-Mare | 6th |

== Current league stadiums 2025–26 ==
Locations of the National League South 2024–25 teams (Greater London and Essex shown in more detail below)
Locations of the National League South 2025–26 teams (Greater London and environ clubs)

The stadiums of all teams in the league for the 2025–26 season are listed below in capacity order:

| Home club | Stadium name | Capacity |
|---|---|---|
| Bath City | Twerton Park | 8,840 |
| Farnborough | Cherrywood Road | 7,000 |
| Dover Athletic | Crabble Athletic Ground | 6,500 |
| Torquay United | Plainmoor | 6,500 |
| Dagenham & Redbridge | Victoria Road | 6,078 |
| Chesham United | The Meadow | 5,000 |
| Salisbury | Raymond McEnhill Stadium | 5,000 |
| Ebbsfleet United | Stonebridge Road | 4,800 |
| Dorking Wanderers | Meadowbank Stadium | 4,250 |
| Maidstone United | Gallagher Stadium | 4,200 |
| Eastbourne Borough | Priory Lane | 4,151 |
| Maidenhead United | York Road | 4,000 |
| Worthing | Woodside Road | 4,000 |
| Hampton & Richmond Borough | Beveree Stadium | 3,500 |
| Hornchurch | Hornchurch Stadium | 3,500 |
| Weston-super-Mare | Woodspring Stadium | 3,500 |
| Hemel Hempstead Town | Vauxhall Road | 3,152 |
| Chelmsford City | Melbourne Stadium | 3,502 |
| Chippenham Town | Hardenhuish Park | 3,000 |
| Horsham | Hop Oast Stadium | 3,000 |
| Tonbridge Angels | Longmead Stadium | 3,000 |
| AFC Totton | Testwood Stadium | 3,000 |
| Enfield Town | Queen Elizabeth II Stadium | 2,500 |
| Slough Town | Arbour Park | 2,000 |

== Past winners ==
| Season | Winner | Playoff winner |
|---|---|---|
| 2004–05 | Grays Athletic | Eastbourne Borough ** |
| 2005–06 | Weymouth | St Albans City |
| 2006–07 | Histon | Salisbury City |
| 2007–08 | Lewes | Eastbourne Borough |
| 2008–09 | AFC Wimbledon | Hayes & Yeading United |
| 2009–10 | Newport County | Bath City |
| 2010–11 | Braintree Town | Ebbsfleet United |
| 2011–12 | Woking | Dartford |
| 2012–13 | Welling United | Salisbury City |
| 2013–14 | Eastleigh | Dover Athletic |
| 2014–15 | Bromley | Boreham Wood |
| 2015–16 | Sutton United | Maidstone United |
| 2016–17 | Maidenhead United | Ebbsfleet United |
| 2017–18 | Havant & Waterlooville | Braintree Town |
| 2018–19 | Torquay United | Woking |
| 2019–20 | Wealdstone | Weymouth |
| 2020–21 | None, season curtailed and voided | |
| 2021–22 | Maidstone United | Dorking Wanderers |
| 2022–23 | Ebbsfleet United | Oxford City |
| 2023–24 | Yeovil Town | Braintree Town |
| 2024–25 | Truro City | Boreham Wood |
| 2025–26 | Worthing | Hornchurch |

** Not promoted. In 2004–05 only three promotion places were available to the Conference National. The third place was decided in a Playoff at Stoke City's Britannia Stadium, which Eastbourne lost 2–1 to the Conference North playoff winners, Altrincham.

== Attendances ==
As of the end of the 2025–26 season, the record for the highest average league attendance is 1,319. Torquay United hold the record for the highest club average attendance with 3,943, having previously broken the record in the 2018–19 season with 2,551.

Average and highest attendances

Attendance broke the previous National League South record

| Season | League average attendance | Highest average | |
| Season | League average attendance | Club | Attendance |
|---|---|---|---|
| 2012–13 | 487 | Salisbury City | 886 |
| 2013–14 | 461 | Ebbsfleet United | 1,090 |
| 2014–15 | 521 | Bromley | 1,081 |
| 2015–16 (Note: Inaugural season of the National League South) | 653 | Maidstone United | 2,222 |
| 2016–17 | 586 | Ebbsfleet United | 1,350 |
| 2017–18 | 551 | Dartford | 1,053 |
| 2018–19 | 877 | Torquay United | 2,551 |
| 2019–20 | 855 | Dulwich Hamlet | 2,200 |
| 2020–21 | No attendances due to COVID-19 pandemic | | |
| 2021–22 | 1,002 | Dulwich Hamlet | 2,712 |
| 2022–23 | 899 | Dulwich Hamlet | 2,464 |
| 2023–24 | 1,205 | Yeovil Town | 3,916 |
| 2024–25 | 1,226 | Torquay United | 3,943 |
| 2025–26 | 1,319 | Torquay United | 3,509 |

== Records ==
| Biggest home win | 8 – Maidenhead United 8–0 Truro City, 8 September 2012; Ebbsfleet United 8–0 Bishop's Stortford, 21 March 2017, Dorking Wanderers 8-0 Havant and Waterlooville, 26 December 2021, Maidstone United 8-0 Enfield Town F.C., 24 February 2026 |
| Biggest away win | 7 – Dorchester Town 0–7 Grays Athletic, 23 October 2004 |
| Highest scoring match | 11 – Bognor Regis Town 6–5 Welling United, 11 September 2004; Bath City 7–4 Farnborough, 17 February 2015 |
| Consecutive wins | 12 – Welling United, 2012–13 |
| Consecutive games unbeaten | 25 – Sutton United, 2015–16 |
| Most wins in a season | 32 – Newport County 2009–10 |
| Fewest wins in a season | 4 – Dover Athletic 2023-24 |
| Most defeats in a season | 34 – Fisher Athletic 2008–09 |
| Fewest defeats in a season | 3 – Newport County 2009–10 |
| Most draws in a season | 18 – Hampton & Richmond Borough 2017–18 |
| Fewest draws in a season | 3 – Redbridge 2004–05; Eastleigh 2005–06; Fisher Athletic 2008–09 |
| Most goals scored in a season | 118 – Grays Athletic, 2004–05 |
| Fewest goals scored in a season | 22 – Fisher Athletic 2008–09 |
| Most goals conceded in a season | 103 – Weymouth 2009–10 |
| Fewest goals conceded in a season | 26 – Newport County, 2009–10 |
| Most clean sheets in a season | 23 – Newport County 2009–10 and Alexis André Jr. (Maidstone United) 2024-2025 |
| Most points in a season | 103 – Newport County 2009–10 & Ebbsfleet United 2022-23 |
| Most individual goals in a season | 44 – Dave Tarpey (Maidenhead United), 2016–17 |
| Top goalscorer | 129 – Shaun Jeffers (St Albans City, Chelmsford City, Hampton & Richmond Borough) |
| Most individual goals in a game | 6 – Mitchell Bryant, Weymouth 0–6 Basingstoke Town, 13 February 2010 |
| Highest attendance | 6,462 – Yeovil Town vs. Torquay United, 29 March 2024 |
| Highest average attendance | 3,943 – Torquay United, 2024–25 |
| Lowest home attendance | 52 out of 2,812 - Truro City vs. Torquay United, 1 January 2019 |
| Highest away attendance | 2,760 out of 2,812 - Truro City vs. Torquay United, 1 January 2019 |

== See also ==
- National League
- National League North
