= 2016–17 Barnet F.C. season =

Barnet
2016–17 season
- Chairman: Anthony Kleanthous
- Manager: Martin Allen (resigned 1 December 2016); Rossi Eames & Henry Newman (appointed 1 December 2016, Newman left 14 February 2017, Eames became assistant 15 February 2017); Kevin Nugent (appointed 15 February 2017, left by mutual consent 15 April 2017); Rossi Eames (appointed 15 April 2017)
- Stadium: The Hive Stadium
- League Two: 15th
- FA Cup: First round (vs. Shrewsbury Town)
- EFL Cup: First round (vs. Millwall)
- EFL Trophy: 4th in Group F
- Top goalscorer: League: John Akinde (26); All: John Akinde (26)
- Highest home attendance: 4,571 vs. Portsmouth (18 Feb 2016)
- Lowest home attendance: 393 vs. Peterborough United (8 Nov 2016)
Home colours	Away colours	Third colours

The 2016–17 season is Barnet's 129th year in existence and second consecutive season in League Two. Along with competing in League Two, the club also participated in the FA Cup, EFL Cup and EFL Trophy.

Martin Allen left for Eastleigh on 1 December, and Rossi Eames & Henry Newman were appointed interim managers on the same date. Eames took charge of a win over Morecambe alone on 14 February, and Newman departed the club the following day. Kevin Nugent was then appointed first team coach on the same day, with Eames assisting. Nugent left by mutual consent on 15 April 2017, with Eames returning to take charge of the team.

The season covers the period from 1 July 2016 to 30 June 2017.

== Transfers ==
=== In ===
Date from	Position	Nationality	Name	From	Fee	Ref.
1 July 2016	RW	(England)	Alex Nicholls	Exeter City	Free transfer	
1 July 2016	DM	(England)	Ryan Watson	Leicester City	Free transfer	
2 August 2016	CF	(France)	Jean-Louis Akpa Akpro	Shrewsbury Town	Free transfer	
4 August 2016	RW	(Jamaica)	Jamal Campbell-Ryce	Sheffield United	Free transfer	
1 January 2017	CF	(Nigeria)	Simeon Akinola	Braintree Town	£40,000	
1 January 2017	CB	(Portugal)	Ricardo Almeida Santos	Peterborough United	£100,000	
1 January 2017	CM	(England)	Dan Sweeney	Maidstone United	Undisclosed	
1 January 2017	LB	(Democratic Republic of the Congo)	David Tutonda	Cardiff City	Free transfer	
17 January 2017	LM	(England)	Luke Coulson	Eastleigh	Undisclosed	
23 January 2017	CB	(England)	Charlie Clough	Forest Green Rovers	Undisclosed	
27 January 2017	AM	(Spain)	Ruben Bover	New York Cosmos	Free transfer	
4 March 2017	CF	(England)	Sam Akinde	Free agent	Free transfer	

=== Out ===
Date from	Position	Nationality	Name	To	Fee	Ref.
1 July 2016	CB	(England)	Joe Gater	Basingstoke Town	Released	(Note: Following Gater's release, he signed for Basingstoke Town.)
1 July 2016	CF	(England)	Ryan Gondoh	Metropolitan Police	Released	(Note: Following Gondoh's release, he signed for Metropolitan Police.)
1 July 2016	DM	(England)	Charlie Kennedy	Basingstoke Town	Released	(Note: Following Kennedy's release, he signed for Basingstoke Town.)
1 July 2016	CM	(England)	Mark Randall	Newport County	Released	(Note: Following Randall's release, he signed for Newport County.)
1 July 2016	CF	(England)	Mathew Stevens	Peterborough United	Compensation	
1 July 2016	RB	(Ghana)	Andy Yiadom	Barnsley	Free transfer	
26 July 2016	GK	(Republic of Ireland)	Graham Stack	Kerala Blasters	Free transfer	(Note: Following Stack's release, he signed for Kerala Blasters.)
22 November 2016	CB	(England)	Bondz N'Gala	Eastleigh	£60,000	
15 December 2016	RB	(Trinidad and Tobago)	Gavin Hoyte	Eastleigh	Free transfer	
15 December 2016	CM	(England)	Sam Togwell	Eastleigh	£20,000	
16 January 2017	LW	(Malta)	Luke Gambin	Luton Town	Undisclosed	
17 January 2017	LB	(England)	Sam Muggleton	Eastleigh	Undisclosed	
31 January 2017	CB	(Sierra Leone)	Alie Sesay	IK Frej	Mutual consent	(Note: Following Sesay's release, he signed for IK Frej.)
31 January 2017	CF	(England)	Ben Tomlinson	Carlisle United	Mutual consent	(Note: Following Tomlinson's departure, he signed for Carlisle United.)

=== Loans in ===
Date from	Position	Nationality	Name	From	Date until	Ref.
28 July 2016	GK	(England)	Josh Vickers	Swansea City	End of season	
25 February 2017	GK	(England)	Harry Burgoyne	Wolverhampton Wanderers	4 March 2017	
3 March 2017	GK	(Liechtenstein)	Benjamin Büchel	Oxford United	31 March 2017	

=== Loans out ===
Date from	Position	Nationality	Name	To	Date until	Ref.
12 September 2016	DM	(England)	Tom Champion	Lincoln City	14 December 2016	
23 September 2016	FB	(England)	Tom Day	Staines Town	21 October 2016	
12 October 2016	AM	(Romania)	Shane Cojocarel	Metropolitan Police	9 November 2016	
12 October 2016	AM	(England)	Ephron Mason-Clark	Metropolitan Police	9 November 2016	
28 October 2016	CM	(England)	Jack Taylor	Hampton & Richmond Borough	25 November 2016	
15 November 2016	AM	(Romania)	Shane Cojocarel	Billericay Town	13 December 2016	
6 January 2017	AM	(England)	Justin Amaluzor	Hemel Hempstead Town	3 February 2017	
6 January 2017	AM	(Romania)	Shane Cojocarel	Merstham	3 February 2017	
13 January 2017	AM	(Nigeria)	Fumnaya Shomotun	Margate	10 February 2017	
13 January 2017	FB	(England)	Joe Payne	Grays Athletic	10 February 2017	
January 2017	DF	(England)	Tyler Brown	Whyteleafe		
January 2017	MF	(England)	Tobi Coker	A.F.C. Hornchurch		
20 January 2017	CM	(England)	Wesley Fonguck	Hampton & Richmond Borough	February 2017	
31 January 2017	CF	(France)	Jean-Louis Akpa Akpro	Yeovil Town	End of Season	
31 January 2017	AM	(England)	Alex Nicholls	Dundee United	End of Season	

== Competitions ==
=== Pre-season friendlies ===
9 July 2016 Friendly	Cheshunt	1–5	Barnet	Cheshunt
13:00 BST	Bolle 32'	Report	Akinde 2'; Kizzi 36' (o.g.); Gash 48'; Fonguck 60'; Shomotun 87'	Stadium: Theobalds Lane

9 July 2016 Friendly	Ware	0–4	Barnet	Ware
16:00 BST		Report	Nwogu 12'; Tomlinson 32'; J. Taylor 45'; Mason-Clark 57'	Stadium: Wodson Park

13 July 2016 Friendly	Barnet	1–0	Ipswich Town	Canons Park
20:00 BST	Akinde 69' (pen.)	Report		Stadium: The Hive Stadium; Attendance: 803

13 July 2016 Friendly	Bedfont & Feltham	1–4	Barnet XI	Bedfont
20:00 BST	Smith (o.g.)	Report	Nwogu (pen); Batt; Tomlinson; Cojocarel	Stadium: The Orchard

16 July 2016 Friendly	Staines Town	0–2	Barnet	Staines-upon-Thames
15:00 BST		Report	Watson 3' 44'	Stadium: Wheatsheaf Park

16 July 2016 Friendly	Enfield Town	2–1	Barnet XI	Enfield Town
15:00 BST	Whitely 43'; Gabriel 47'	Report	Batt 35'	Stadium: Queen Elizabeth II Stadium; Attendance: 383

23 July 2016 Friendly	Barnet	2–0	Gillingham	Canons Park
15:00 BST	Akinde 54'; Nicholls 66'	Report		Stadium: The Hive Stadium

26 July 2016 Friendly	Eastleigh	3–2	Barnet	Eastleigh
19:45 BST	Obileye 27'; Wilson 48'; Lafayette 83'	Report	Payne 64'; Akpa Akpro 89'	Stadium: Ten Acres

26 July 2016 Friendly	Tooting & Mitcham United	1–1	Barnet XI	Morden
20:00 BST	Bassett 42'		Amaluzor 88'	Stadium: Imperial Fields; Attendance: 81

30 July 2016 Friendly	Barnet	3–3	Oxford United	Canons Park
15:00 BST	Weston 6'; Akinde 10', 66' (pen.)	Report	Thomas 43', 46'; Crowley 80'	Stadium: The Hive Stadium

30 July 2016 Friendly	Ashford Town	1–5	Barnet XI	Stanwell
15:00 BST	Bitmead		Amaluzor; Mason-Clark (pen); Cojocarel; Fonguck (pen); Cheema	Stadium: The Robert Parker Stadium

1 August 2016 Friendly	Metropolitan Police	0–3	Barnet XI	East Molesey
20:00 BST			Shomotun; Cojocarel; Cheema	Stadium: Imber Court

=== League Two ===
==== League table ====
Pos	Team	Pld	W	D	L	GF	GA	GD	Pts
13	Accrington Stanley	46	17	14	15	59	56	+3	65
14	Grimsby Town	46	17	11	18	59	63	−4	62
15	Barnet	46	14	15	17	57	64	−7	57
16	Notts County	46	16	8	22	54	76	−22	56
17	Crewe Alexandra	46	14	13	19	58	67	−9	55

Updated to match(es) played on 6 May 2017. Source: BBC Sport
Rules for classification: 1) Points; 2) Goal difference; 3) Number of goals scored

==== Matches ====
6 August 2016 1	Cambridge United	1–1	Barnet	Cambridge
15:00 BST	Mingoia 61'	Report	Togwell (yellow card) 70'; Nicholls 75'	Stadium: Abbey Stadium

13 August 2016 2	Barnet	2–0	Accrington Stanley	Canons Park
15:00 BST	Akinde 33' (yellow card) 50'; Akpa Akpro 60'	Report		Stadium: The Hive Stadium

16 August 2016 3	Barnet	1–1	Blackpool	Canons Park
19:45 BST	Togwell (yellow card) 44'; Dembélé (yellow card) 78'; Akinde 90+4'	Report	Cullen 24' (yellow card) 64'; Slocombe (yellow card) 53'; Osayi-Samuel (yellow card) 67'	Stadium: The Hive Stadium

20 August 2016 4	Crawley Town	1–1	Barnet	Crawley
15:00 BST	McNerney 67'	Report	Akinde 3'; Watson (yellow card) 53'	Stadium: Broadfield Stadium

27 August 2016 5	Barnet	0–1	Carlisle United	Canons Park
15:00 BST	Nelson (yellow card) 76'	Report	Ibehre 21' (yellow card) 33'	Stadium: The Hive Stadium

10 September 2016 6	Mansfield Town	0–1	Barnet	Mansfield
15:00 BST	Rose (yellow card) 14'; Hemmings (yellow card) 42'; Hurst (yellow card) 70'	Report	Akinde 57'; Gambin (yellow card) 66'; Campbell-Ryce (yellow card) 82'	Stadium: One Call Stadium; Attendance: 2,523 (122 Barnet fans); Referee: Sebastian Stockbridge

17 September 2016 7	Barnet	1–1	Colchester United	Canons Park, London
15:00 BST	Weston 82'		Fosu 6'; Eastman (yellow card) 68'; Guthrie (yellow card) 87'	Stadium: The Hive Stadium

24 September 2016 8	Portsmouth	5–1	Barnet	Portsmouth
15:00 BST	Chaplin 34' (yellow card) 72'; Roberts 50' (penalty missed) (yellow card) 88'; Baker 56'; Lalkovič 78'; Rose 90+2'	Report	Akinde 27' (pen.); Watson (yellow card) 29'; Batt (yellow card) 59'; Dembélé (red card) 64'	Stadium: Fratton Park; Attendance: 16,280; Referee: Darren England

27 September 2016 9	Barnet	2–2	Morecambe	Canons Park, London
20:00 BST	Akinde 7', 31'	Report	Barkhuizen 9'; Stockton 81'	Stadium: The Hive Stadium; Attendance: 1,164; Referee: Gavin Ward

1 October 2016 10	Barnet	0–0	Leyton Orient	Canons Park, London
15:00 BST	Dembélé (yellow card) 40'	Report	Kelly (yellow card) 51'; McCallum (yellow card) 81'; Massey (yellow card) 84'	Stadium: The Hive Stadium; Attendance: 2,682; Referee: Darren Handley

8 October 2016 11	Doncaster Rovers	3–2	Barnet	Doncaster
15:00 BST	Coppinger 15'; Blair 32'; Rowe (yellow card) 81'; Williams (yellow card) 90+2' (goal) 90+2'	Report	Dembélé 63'; Gambin 86'	Stadium: Keepmoat Stadium; Attendance: 4,861; Referee: Trevor Kettle

15 October 2016 12	Barnet	1–4	Exeter City	Canons Park, London
15:00 BST	Akinde 11' (yellow card) 18'; Watson (yellow card) 70'; Taylor (yellow card) 77'	Report	Taylor 43' (yellow card) 67'; Holmes 50'; Wheeler 56'; Reid 81' (pen.)	Stadium: The Hive Stadium; Attendance: 1,640; Referee: Michael Salisbury

22 October 2016 13	Wycombe Wanderers	0–2	Barnet	High Wycombe
15:00 BST	Weston (yellow card) 83' (yellow-red card) 90'	Report	Champion (yellow card) 64'; Vilhete 65' (yellow card) 90+3'; Akinde (yellow card) 71' (goal) 90+3'	Stadium: Adams Park; Attendance: 3,596; Referee: Graham Horwood

25 October 2016 14	Newport County	2–2	Barnet	Newport
19:45 BST	Randall (yellow card) 18'; Tozer 32'; Rigg 89' (pen.)	Report	N'Gala (yellow card) 58'; Nicholls (yellow card) 68'; Akinde 76', 85' (yellow card) 81'	Stadium: Rodney Parade; Attendance: 2,381; Referee: Graham Salisbury

29 October 2016 15	Barnet	3–2	Hartlepool United	Canons Park, London
15:00 BST	Akinde (yellow card) 43' (goal) 68' (pen.); Gambin 76'; Batt 79'; Dembélé (yellow card) 88'	Report	Thomas 31'; Amond 53'; Donnelly (red card) 68'; Carson (yellow card) 71'; Featherstone (yellow card) 88'; Harrison (yellow card) 90+10'	Stadium: The Hive Stadium; Attendance: 1,690; Referee: Nick Kinseley

12 November 2016 16	Grimsby Town	2–2	Barnet	Cleethorpes
15:00 GMT	Bogle 22', 35' (penalty missed) 90+3'; Chambers (yellow card) 43'; Bolarinwa (yellow card) 81'; Collins (yellow card) 90+6'	Report	Dembélé (yellow card) 45+2'; Akinde 50' (pen.), 55' (pen.); Champion (yellow card) 74'; Sesay (red card) 90'	Stadium: Blundell Park; Attendance: 5,519; Referee: Seb Stockbridge

19 November 2016 17	Barnet	0–0	Crewe Alexandra	Canons Park, London
15:00 GMT		Report	Lowery (yellow card) 70'	Stadium: The Hive Stadium; Attendance: 1,603; Referee: Gavin Ward

22 November 2016 18	Plymouth Argyle	0–2	Barnet	Plymouth
19:45 GMT	Smith (yellow card) 62'	Report	Dembélé 7'; Akinde 45'; Watson (yellow card) 62'	Stadium: Home Park; Attendance: 7,188; Referee: Brett Huxtable

26 November 2016 19	Barnet	3–2	Notts County	Canons Park, London
15:00 GMT	Dembélé 30'; Gambin 64', 74' (yellow card) 65'	Report	O'Connor 15' (yellow card) 58'; Tootle (yellow card) 67'; Forte 77'	Stadium: The Hive Stadium; Attendance: 1,958; Referee: Darren Handley

10 December 2016 20	Yeovil Town	0–1	Barnet	Yeovil
15:00 GMT		Report	Akinde (yellow card) 27'; Dembélé (yellow card) 34'; Nicholls 84'; Johnson (yellow card) 86'	Stadium: Huish Park; Attendance: 3,254; Referee: Kevin Johnson

17 December 2016 21	Barnet	1–2	Stevenage	Canons Park, London
15:00 GMT	Akinde 47' (pen.) (yellow card) 69'; Taylor (yellow card) 72'; Dembélé (yellow card) 78'; Nelson (yellow card) 84'	Report	Gorman 38' (yellow card) 75'; King (yellow card) 45'; Wilkinson 61'	Stadium: The Hive Stadium; Attendance: 3,228; Referee: Lee Swabey

26 December 2016 22	Cheltenham Town	1–2	Barnet	Cheltenham
15:00 GMT	Wright 44'; Downes (yellow card) 54'; Cranston (yellow card) 67'; Waters (yellow card) 74'; Pell (yellow card) 90+1'	Report	Weston 8'; Johnson (yellow card) 50'; Akinde 51'; Campbell-Ryce (yellow card) 89'	Stadium: LCI Rail Stadium; Attendance: 3,441; Referee: John Busby

31 December 2016 23	Luton Town	3–1	Barnet	Luton
15:00 GMT	McGeehan (yellow card) 23' (goal) 49'; Sheehan 31'; Walton (yellow card) 39'; Rea (yellow card) 50'; Gilliead 56' (yellow card) 88'	Report	Dembélé (yellow card) 2' (goal) 37'; Muggleton (yellow card) 90+2'	Stadium: Kenilworth Road Stadium; Attendance: 8,262; Referee: Mark Haywood

2 January 2017 24	Barnet	1–0	Plymouth Argyle	Canons Park, London
15:00 GMT	Vilhete 14'	Report	Bradley (yellow card) 55'	Stadium: The Hive Stadium; Attendance: 3,045; Referee: Nick Kinseley

7 January 2017 25	Leyton Orient	1–3	Barnet	Leyton, London
15:00 GMT	Mézague (yellow card) 25'; McCallum 79'; Hunt (yellow card) 90+4'	Report	Santos 63', 66'; Weston 90+2'	Stadium: Matchroom Stadium; Attendance: 4,642; Referee: Andy Haines

14 January 2017 26	Barnet	1–3	Doncaster Rovers	Canons Park, London
15:00 GMT	Akinde 13'; Champion (yellow card) 29'; Weston (yellow card) 37'; Campbell-Ryce (yellow card) 41'; Vilhete (yellow card) 73'; Nelson (yellow card) 90+3'	Report	Coppinger 18', 31'; Baudry (yellow card) 21'; Marquis 28'; Houghton (yellow card) 82'	Stadium: The Hive Stadium; Attendance: 2,582; Referee: John Brooks

21 January 2017 27	Barnet	0–0	Newport County	Canons Park, London
15:00 GMT		Report	O'Brien (yellow card) 74'	Stadium: The Hive Stadium; Attendance: 2,623; Referee: Darren England

28 January 2017 28	Carlisle United	1–1	Barnet	Carlisle
15:00 GMT	Miller (yellow card) 20'; Joyce (yellow card) 24'; Wyke 29'; Brisley (yellow card) 43'	Report	Ricardo (yellow card) 28'; Akinola (red card) 66'; Akinde 77' (pen.)	Stadium: Brunton Park; Attendance: 4,547; Referee: Michael Salisbury

4 February 2017 29	Barnet	0–2	Mansfield Town	Canons Park, London
15:00 GMT	Akinde (yellow card) 34'	Report	Whiteman 37'; Coulthirst 60' (pen.); White (yellow card) 62'; Green (yellow card) 78'; Potter (yellow card) 80'	Stadium: The Hive Stadium; Attendance: 1,859; Referee: Lee Collins

11 February 2017 30	Colchester United	2–1	Barnet	Colchester
15:00 GMT	Guthrie 18'; Dickenson 42'	Report	Akinde 86'	Stadium: Colchester Community Stadium; Attendance: 3,606; Referee: John Busby

14 February 2017 31	Morecambe	0–1	Barnet	Morecambe
19:45 GMT	Murphy (red card) 27'	Report	Bover (yellow card) 60'; Champion 65'	Stadium: Globe Arena; Attendance: 1,100; Referee: David Coote

18 February 2017 32	Barnet	1–1	Portsmouth	Canons Park, London
15:00 GMT	Vilhete 82'	Report	Roberts (yellow card) 68'; Chaplin 89'	Stadium: The Hive Stadium; Attendance: 4,571; Referee: Mark Brown

25 February 2017 33	Barnet	0–1	Cambridge United	Canons Park, London
15:00 GMT	Vilhete (yellow card) 57'; Bover (yellow card) 67'	Report	Legge (yellow card) 19'; Mingoia (yellow card) 23'; Carroll (yellow card) 43'; Roberts (yellow card) 49'; Berry 65'; Elito (yellow card) 90+1'; Taylor (yellow card) 90+3'	Stadium: The Hive Stadium; Attendance: 2,396; Referee: Charles Breakspear

28 February 2017 34	Blackpool	2–2	Barnet	Blackpool
19:45 GMT	Delfouneso 59'; Daniel (yellow card) 64'; Vassell (yellow card) 90' (goal) 90+1'	Report	Akinde 13'; Taylor (yellow card) 44'; Clough 47' (yellow card) 84'; Bover (yellow card) 52'	Stadium: Bloomfield Road; Attendance: 2,094; Referee: Eddie Ilderton

4 March 2017 35	Accrington Stanley	1–0	Barnet	Accrington
15:00 GMT	Clare (yellow card) 43'; McCartan 54'	Report	Bover (yellow card) 22'; Akinde (yellow card) 33'; Dembélé (yellow card) 67'	Stadium: Crown Ground; Attendance: 1,236; Referee: Mark Haywood

11 March 2017 36	Barnet	2–2	Crawley Town	Canons Park, London
15:00 GMT	Akinola 39'; Campbell-Ryce 88' (yellow card) 89'	Report	Murphy 31'; Henderson (yellow card) 38'; Boldewijn 54'	Stadium: The Hive Stadium; Attendance: 1,701; Referee: David Webb

15 March 2017 37	Barnet	2–2	Yeovil Town	Canons Park, London
20:00 GMT	Nelson 30'; Watson 85'	Report	Whitfield 14'; Shephard 90+1'	Stadium: The Hive Stadium; Attendance: 1,525; Referee: Steve Martin

19 March 2017 38	Notts County	1–0	Barnet	Nottingham
15:00 GMT	Yeates (red card) 11'; Tootle 49'; Ameobi (yellow card) 81'; Bola (yellow card) 90+3'	Report	Akinde (yellow card) 20'	Stadium: Meadow Lane; Attendance: 7,178; Referee: Keith Stroud

25 March 2017 39	Barnet	3–1	Cheltenham Town	Canons Park, London
15:00 GMT	Tutonda (yellow card) 50'; Weston 70'; Akinde 77', 79'	Report	Wright 16'; Winchester (yellow card) 62'	Stadium: The Hive Stadium; Attendance: 1,861; Referee: Chris Sarginson

1 April 2017 40	Stevenage	1–0	Barnet	Stevenage
15:00 BST	Pett 7'	Report	Akinde (yellow card) 68'	Stadium: Broadhall Way; Attendance: 3,657; Referee: Mark Heywood

8 April 2017 41	Barnet	0–1	Luton Town	Canons Park, London
15:00 BST	Taylor (yellow card) 49'	Report	Rea (yellow card) 60'; Lee 67'; Hylton (yellow card) 90+4'	Stadium: The Hive Stadium; Referee: Darren England

14 April 2017 42	Exeter City	2–1	Barnet	Exeter
15:00 BST	Moore-Taylor 4'; Wheeler 6'; Reid (yellow card) 32'; Ampadu (yellow card) 62'	Report	Akinde 69'; Campbell-Ryce (yellow card) 88'	Stadium: St James' Park; Attendance: 4,780; Referee: Seb Stockbridge

17 April 2017 43	Barnet	0–2	Wycombe Wanderers	Canons Park, London
15:00 BST	Akinde (yellow card) 32'; Taylor (yellow card) 52'; Campbell-Ryce (yellow card) 63'; Weston (yellow card) 90'; Clough (yellow card) 90+6'	Report	Saunders 21' (yellow card) 90+6'; Jacobson (yellow card) 28' (goal) 90' (pen.); Kashket (yellow card) 62'; Harriman (yellow card) 73'; Jombati (yellow card) 82'	Stadium: The Hive Stadium; Attendance: 2,507; Referee: Gavin Ward

22 April 2017 44	Hartlepool United	0–2	Barnet	Hartlepool
15:00 BST		Report	Akinde 66'; Akinola 71'	Stadium: Victoria Park; Attendance: 4,208; Referee: Trevor Kettle

29 April 2017 45	Barnet	3–1	Grimsby Town	Canons Park, London
15:00 BST	Akinde 21'; Tutonda 40'; Weston 53'	Report	Clements (yellow card) 52'; Disley (yellow card) 71' (goal) 74'; Bolatinwa (yellow card) 90'	Stadium: The Hive Stadium; Attendance: 3,247; Referee: Sebastian Stockbridge

6 May 2017 46	Crewe Alexandra	4–1	Barnet	Crewe
17:30 BST	Dagnall 8', 25', 67'; Cooper 76'	Report	Weston 64'	Stadium: Gresty Road; Attendance: 4,587; Referee: John Brooks

=== FA Cup ===
5 November 2016 First round	Shrewsbury Town	3–0	Barnet	Shrewsbury
15:00 GMT	Sadler 27'; Leitch-Smith 32'; Ogogo (yellow card) 47'; Grimmer 57'	Report	Nelson (yellow card) 16'; Tomlinson (yellow card) 37'; Dembélé (yellow card) 66'	Stadium: Greenhous Meadow; Attendance: 3,120; Referee: Ben Toner

=== EFL Cup ===
9 August 2016 First round	Barnet	0–4	Millwall	Canons Park
20:00 BST		Report	Akinde 23' (o.g.); O'Brien 35'; Morison 74'; Onyedinma 81' (pen.)	Stadium: The Hive Stadium; Attendance: 1,410; Referee: Dean Whitestone

=== EFL Trophy ===
Pos	Div	Team	Pld	W	PW	PL	L	GF	GA	GD	Pts	Qualification
1	ACA	Norwich City U21	3	3	0	0	0	15	2	+13	9	Advance to Round 2
2	L1	Milton Keynes Dons	3	1	1	0	1	4	6	−2	5	Advance to Round 2
3	L1	Peterborough United	3	1	0	0	2	3	8	−5	3	
4	L2	Barnet	3	0	0	1	2	3	9	−6	1	

Source: Sky Sports

30 August 2016 Group stage 1	Milton Keynes Dons	2–2 (5–3 p)	Barnet	Denbigh
19:45 BST	Reeves 17' (yellow card) 60'; Wootton (yellow card) 36'; Walsh 82'		Nelson (yellow card) 59'; Nicholls 62'; Weston 72'	Stadium: Stadium mk

4 October 2016 Group stage 2	Barnet	0–5	Norwich City	Canons Park, London
19:45 BST	N'Gala (red card) 33'	Report	Thompson (yellow card) 14'; Josh Murphy 45+2', 56', 89'; Canós 68'; Oliveira 79'	Stadium: The Hive Stadium; Attendance: 457; Referee: Kevin Johnson

8 November 2016 Group stage 3	Barnet	1–2	Peterborough United	Canons Park, London
20:00 GMT	Amaluzor 68'	Report	Taylor 6'; Moncur 84'	Stadium: The Hive Stadium; Attendance: 393; Referee: Andy Woolmer

=== Middlesex Senior Cup ===
21 November 2016 Second round	Barnet	3–3 (5–6 p)	Enfield Town	Canons Park, London
19:45 BST	Kyei 65'; Fonguck 70'; Payne 85'	Report	Wynter 30'; Joseph 55'; Devyne 86'	Stadium: The Hive Stadium; Attendance: 207; Referee: Michael Smith

== Squad statistics ==
=== Appearances and goals ===
As of 6 May 2017

Number	Position	Nationality	Name	League		FA Cup		League Cup		FL Trophy		Total	
Number	Position	Nationality	Name	Apps.	Goals	Apps.	Goals	Apps.	Goals	Apps.	Goals	Apps.	Goals
1	GK	(England)	Jamie Stephens	18	0	1	0	0	0	1	0	20	0
2	DF	(England)	James Pearson	0	0	0	0	0	0	0	0	0	0
3	DF	(England)	Elliot Johnson	33 (3)	0	1	0	1	0	2	0	37 (3)	0
4	DF	(France)	Bira Dembélé	23	4	1	0	1	0	2	0	27	4
5	DF	(Portugal)	Ricardo Almeida Santos	15	2	0	0	0	0	0	0	15	2
6	DF	(England)	Michael Nelson	43	1	1	0	1	0	1	0	46	1
7	MF	(England)	Ryan Watson	15 (4)	1	0 (1)	0	1	0	1	0	17 (5)	1
8	MF	(England)	Curtis Weston	36 (4)	6	1	0	1	0	1	1	39 (4)	6
9	FW	(England)	John Akinde	46	26	0	0	1	0	1	0	48	26
10	FW	(England)	Michael Gash	2	0	0	0	0 (1)	0	0	0	2 (1)	0
11	MF	(Spain)	Ruben Bover	10 (4)	0	0	0	0	0	0	0	10 (4)	0
12	GK	(England)	Josh Vickers (on loan from Swansea City)	22 (1)	0	0	0	1	0	2	0	25 (1)	0
13	MF	(Jamaica)	Jamal Campbell-Ryce	23 (9)	1	0	0	0	0	0	0	23 (9)	1
14	FW	(Nigeria)	Simeon Akinola	14 (5)	2	0	0	0	0	0	0	14 (5)	2
16	MF	(England)	Harry Taylor	22 (3)	0	0	0	0	0	1	0	23 (3)	0
17	MF	(England)	Luke Coulson	4 (7)	0	0	0	0	0	0	0	4 (7)	0
18	MF	(England)	Nana Kyei	6 (6)	0	0	0	0	0	2	0	8 (6)	0
19	FW	(France)	Jean-Louis Akpa Akpro (on loan at Yeovil Town)	7 (16)	1	1	0	1	0	1 (1)	0	10 (17)	1
20	MF	(England)	Tom Champion	22 (4)	1	1	0	0	0	0	0	23 (4)	1
21	FW	(England)	Shaun Batt	3 (8)	1	0	0	0	0	0	0	3 (8)	1
23	FW	(England)	Alex Nicholls (on loan at Dundee United)	11 (6)	2	0	0	1	0	2	1	14 (6)	3
24	FW	(England)	Sam Akinde	0 (1)	0	0	0	0	0	0	0	0 (1)	0
25	MF	(Nigeria)	Fumnaya Shomotun	3 (1)	0	0	0	0	0	2	0	5 (1)	0
26	DF	(England)	Tom Day	0	0	0	0	0	0	0	0	0	0
27	MF	(England)	Wesley Fonguck	2 (1)	0	0	0	0	0	1	0	3 (1)	0
28	MF	(England)	Jack Taylor	13 (1)	0	0	0	0	0	1	0	14 (1)	0
29	FW	(Romania)	Shane Cojocarel	1 (2)	0	0	0	0	0	0	0	1 (2)	0
30	FW	(England)	Justin Amaluzor	0 (11)	0	0 (1)	0	0 (1)	0	1 (2)	1	1 (15)	1
31	GK	(Guyana)	Kai McKenzie-Lyle	0	0	0	0	0	0	0	0	0	0
32	MF	(Portugal)	Mauro Vilhete	36 (4)	3	1	0	0	0	2	0	39 (4)	3
33	DF	(England)	Joe Payne	0	0	0	0	0	0	0 (1)	0	0 (1)	0
34	MF	(England)	Ephron Mason-Clark	3 (3)	0	0	0	0	0	0 (2)	0	3 (5)	0
35	DF	(England)	Dwight Pascal	0	0	0	0	0	0	1	0	1	0
36	MF	(England)	Rio Connell	0	0	0	0	0	0	0	0	0	0
37	DF	(England)	Tyler Brown	0	0	0	0	0	0	0	0	0	0
38	DF	(England)	Tobi Coker	0	0	0	0	0	0	0	0	0	0
39	MF	(England)	Dan Sweeney	0 (4)	0	0	0	0	0	0	0	0 (4)	0
40	DF	(Democratic Republic of the Congo)	David Tutonda	6 (1)	1	0	0	0	0	0	0	6 (1)	1
41	DF	(England)	Charlie Clough	18	1	0	0	0	0	0	0	18	1
Players who have left the club:
5	DF	(England)	Bondz N'Gala	9 (1)	0	1	0	1	0	2	0	13 (1)	0
11	MF	(Malta)	Luke Gambin	13 (6)	4	0 (1)	0	0 (1)	0	0	0	13 (8)	4
14	MF	(England)	Sam Togwell	11 (1)	0	0	0	1	0	1	0	13 (1)	0
15	MF	(Sierra Leone)	Alie Sesay	2 (3)	0	0	0	0	0	2	0	4 (3)	0
17	DF	(England)	Sam Muggleton	5 (8)	0	1	0	0	0	2 (1)	0	8 (9)	0
22	FW	(England)	Ben Tomlinson	1 (2)	0	1	0	0	0	1 (2)	0	3 (4)	0
24	DF	(Trinidad and Tobago)	Gavin Hoyte	2	0	0	0	0	0	0	0	2	0
42	GK	(England)	Harry Burgoyne (on loan from Wolverhampton Wanderers)	2	0	0	0	0	0	0	0	2	0
43	GK	(Liechtenstein)	Benjamin Büchel (on loan from Oxford United)	4	0	0	0	0	0	0	0	4	0

=== Top scorers ===
Place	Position	Nation	Number	Name	League Two	FA Cup	EFL Cup	EFL Trophy	Total
1	FW	(England)	9	John Akinde	26	0	0	0	26
2	MF	(England)	8	Curtis Weston	6	0	0	1	7
3=	FW	(Malta)	11	Luke Gambin	4	0	0	0	4
3=	DF	(France)	4	Bira Dembélé	4	0	0	0	4
5=	DF	(Portugal)	32	Mauro Vilhete	3	0	0	0	3
5=	FW	(England)	23	Alex Nicholls	2	0	0	1	3
7=	DF	(Portugal)	5	Ricardo Almeida Santos	2	0	0	0	2
7=	FW	(Nigeria)	14	Simeon Akinola	2	0	0	0	2
9=	FW	(France)	19	Jean-Louis Akpa Akpro	1	0	0	0	1
9=	FW	(England)	21	Shaun Batt	1	0	0	0	1
9=	MF	(England)	20	Tom Champion	1	0	0	0	1
9=	DF	(England)	41	Charlie Clough	1	0	0	0	1
9=	MF	(Jamaica)	13	Jamal Campbell-Ryce	1	0	0	0	1
9=	DF	(England)	6	Michael Nelson	1	0	0	0	1
9=	MF	(England)	7	Ryan Watson	1	0	0	0	1
9=	DF	(Democratic Republic of the Congo)	40	David Tutonda	1	0	0	0	1
9=	FW	(England)	30	Justin Amaluzor	0	0	0	1	1
				Totals	57	0	0	3	60
