= 2008–09 Wycombe Wanderers F.C. season =

Wycombe Wanderers F.C.
2008–09 season
- Manager: Peter Taylor until 9 October 2009 Gary Waddock from 13 October 2009
- Stadium: Adams Park
- League Two: 3rd Promoted
- FA Cup: Second round
- League Cup: First round
- Football League Trophy: Second round

The 2008–09 season saw Wycombe Wanderers competed in Football League Two, alongside the FA Cup, Football League Cup and Football League Trophy.

== Competitions ==
=== Football League Two ===
Pos	Team	Pld	W	D	L	GF	GA	GD	Pts	Promotion, qualification or relegation
1	Brentford (C, P)	46	23	16	7	65	36	+29	85	Promotion to Football League One
2	Exeter City (P)	46	22	13	11	65	50	+15	79	Promotion to Football League One
3	Wycombe Wanderers (P)	46	20	18	8	54	33	+21	78	Promotion to Football League One
4	Bury	46	21	15	10	63	43	+20	78	Qualification for League Two play-offs
5	Gillingham (O, P)	46	21	12	13	58	55	+3	75	Qualification for League Two play-offs

Source: The Football League
Rules for classification: 1) points; 2) goal difference; 3) number of goals scored.
(C) Champions; (O) Play-off winners; (P) Promoted

==== Results ====
9 August 2008 1	Wycombe Wanderers	1–1	Morecambe	High Wycombe
	Spence 34'		Artell 66'	Stadium: Adams Park; Attendance: 4,021

16 August 2008 2	Chester City	0–2	Wycombe Wanderers	Chester
			Mousinho 26'; McGleish 67' (pen.)	Stadium: Deva Stadium; Attendance: 1,419

23 August 2008 3	Wycombe Wanderers	1–0	Lincoln City	High Wycombe
	Woodman 15'			Stadium: Adams Park; Attendance: 4,112

30 August 2008 4	Chesterfield	0–1	Wycombe Wanderers	Chesterfield
			Williamson 4'	Stadium: Saltergate; Attendance: 3,175

6 September 2008 5	Rochdale	0–1	Wycombe Wanderers	Rochdale
			Zebroski 31'	Stadium: Spotland; Attendance: 2,880

13 September 2008 6	Wycombe Wanderers	0–0	Brentford	High Wycombe
				Stadium: Adams Park; Attendance: 5,799

20 September 2008 7	Wycombe Wanderers	2–1	Dagenham & Redbridge	High Wycombe
	Church (red card) 22'; Williamson 34', 68'		Strevens 58'	Stadium: Adams Park; Attendance: 4,132

27 September 2008 8	Bury	0–0	Wycombe Wanderers	Bury
				Stadium: Gigg Lane; Attendance: 3,597

4 October 2008 9	Wycombe Wanderers	3–1	Bournemouth	High Wycombe
	Harrold 40'; Zebroski 60'; McGleish 84'		Hollands 57'	Stadium: Adams Park; Attendance: 5,005

11 October 2008 10	Grimsby Town	1–1	Wycombe Wanderers	Grimsby
	Hegarty 2'		Johnson 90'; Doherty (red card) 86'	Stadium: Blundell Park; Attendance: 4,562

18 October 2008 11	Wycombe Wanderers	1–1	Darlington	High Wycombe
	McGleish 90' (pen.)		Kennedy 58'; Ryan (red card) 77'	Stadium: Adams Park; Attendance: 5,345

21 October 2008 12	Barnet	1–1	Wycombe Wanderers	London
	Deverdics 24'		Zebroski 68'	Stadium: Underhill; Attendance: 2,258

25 October 2008 13	Accrington Stanley	0–1	Wycombe Wanderers	Accrington
			Zebroski 90'	Stadium: Crown Ground; Attendance: 1,217

1 November 2008 14	Rotherham United	0–0	Wycombe Wanderers	Sheffield
				Stadium: Don Valley Stadium; Attendance: 3,471

15 November 2008 15	Wycombe Wanderers	1–0	Bradford City	High Wycombe
	Hunt 70'			Stadium: Adams Park; Attendance: 5,002

22 November 2008 16	Wycombe Wanderers	4–2	Port Vale	High Wycombe
	Harrold 23' (pen.), 82'; Zebroski 45', 65'; Harrold (red card) 55'		Richards 51' (pen.); Brown 66'	Stadium: Adams Park; Attendance: 4,521

25 November 2008 17	Notts County	0–2	Wycombe Wanderers	Nottingham
			Harrold 47'; Spence 65'	Stadium: Meadow Lane; Attendance: 2,964

2 December 2008 18	Wycombe Wanderers	4–0	Macclesfield Town	High Wycombe
	Vieira 11', 51'; Balanta 45'; Johnson 71'			Stadium: Adams Park; Attendance: 3,770

6 December 2008 19	Aldershot Town	3–2	Wycombe Wanderers	Aldershot
	Hudson 12', 29'; Hylton 88'		Balanta 76'; Phillips 90'	Stadium: EBB Stadium; Attendance: 3,915

13 December 2008 20	Wycombe Wanderers	0–0	Luton Town	High Wycombe
				Stadium: Adams Park; Attendance: 5,567

20 December 2008 21	Shrewsbury Town	0–1	Wycombe Wanderers	Shrewsbury
			Harrold 55'	Stadium: Prostar Stadium; Attendance: 6,160

26 December 2008 22	Wycombe Wanderers	1–1	Exeter City	High Wycombe
	Harrold 6' (pen.)		Panther 57'	Stadium: Adams Park; Attendance: 6,094

28 December 2008 23	Gillingham	1–1	Wycombe Wanderers	Gillingham
	Weston 84'		Lewis 31' (o.g.)	Stadium: Priestfield; Attendance: 5,979

3 January 2009 24	Wycombe Wanderers	2–1	Bury	High Wycombe
	Harrold 37'; Balanta 63'		Williamson 90' (o.g.)	Stadium: Adams Park; Attendance: 4,961

17 January 2009 25	Wycombe Wanderers	0–1	Grimsby Town	High Wycombe
			Jarman 24'	Stadium: Adams Park; Attendance: 4,461

24 January 2009 26	Bournemouth	3–1	Wycombe Wanderers	Bournemouth
	Pitman 24'; Pearce 32'; Thomson 64'		Harrold 9'	Stadium: Fitness First Stadium; Attendance: 5,946

27 January 2009 27	Macclesfield Town	0–0	Wycombe Wanderers	Macclesfield
				Stadium: Moss Rose; Attendance: 1,306

31 January 2009 28	Wycombe Wanderers	2–1	Accrington Stanley	High Wycombe
	Murdock 24' (o.g.); Harrold 80'		Mullin 16'	Stadium: Adams Park; Attendance: 6,166

14 February 2009 29	Bradford City	1–0	Wycombe Wanderers	Bradford
	Jones 43'			Stadium: Coral Windows Stadium; Attendance: 12,689

17 February 2009 30	Dagenham & Redbridge	0–1	Wycombe Wanderers	London
			Pittman 50'	Stadium: Victoria Road; Attendance: 2,242

23 February 2009 31	Wycombe Wanderers	0–0	Rotherham United	High Wycombe
				Stadium: Adams Park; Attendance: 3,789

28 February 2009 32	Morecambe	0–0	Wycombe Wanderers	Morecambe
				Stadium: Christie Park; Attendance: 2,005

3 March 2009 33	Wycombe Wanderers	2–0	Chester City	High Wycombe
	Phillips 26'; Pittman 66'			Stadium: Adams Park; Attendance: 3,713

7 March 2009 34	Wycombe Wanderers	1–1	Chesterfield	High Wycombe
	Pittman 90'		Lester 31'	Stadium: Adams Park; Attendance: 4,809

10 March 2009 35	Lincoln City	1–0	Wycombe Wanderers	Lincoln
	Elding 49'			Stadium: Sincil Bank; Attendance: 2,562

14 March 2009 36	Brentford	3–3	Wycombe Wanderers	London
	Rhodes 2'; Hunt 22'; Williams 81'		Akinde 15', 49'; Mousinho 40'	Stadium: Griffin Park; Attendance: 10,642

21 March 2009 37	Wycombe Wanderers	0–1	Rochdale	High Wycombe
			Le Fondre 90'	Stadium: Adams Park; Attendance: 6,055

28 March 2009 38	Wycombe Wanderers	1–1	Shrewsbury Town	High Wycombe
	Holt 29'		Davies 75'	Stadium: Adams Park; Attendance: 4,803

31 March 2009 39	Wycombe Wanderers	1–1	Barnet	High Wycombe
	Akinde 19'		Furlong 42'	Stadium: Adams Park; Attendance: 4,066

7 April 2009 40	Darlington	1–2	Wycombe Wanderers	Darlington
	Kennedy 60'		Akinde 39'; Zebroski 90'	Stadium: The Darlington Arena; Attendance: 2,180

11 April 2009 41	Wycombe Wanderers	1–0	Gillingham	High Wycombe
	Akinde 41'			Stadium: Adams Park; Attendance: 6,306

13 April 2009 42	Exeter City	1–0	Wycombe Wanderers	Exeter
	Gill 64'			Stadium: St James Park; Attendance: 8,183

18 April 2009 43	Wycombe Wanderers	3–0	Aldershot Town	High Wycombe
	Akinde 7'; Newman 52' (o.g.); Phillips 67'			Stadium: Adams Park; Attendance: 5,440

21 April 2009 44	Luton Town	0–1	Wycombe Wanderers	Luton
			Akinde 56'	Stadium: Kenilworth Road; Attendance: 6,553

25 April 2009 45	Port Vale	1–1	Wycombe Wanderers	Stoke on Trent
	Collins 61'		Sawyer 80'	Stadium: Vale Park; Attendance: 6,047

2 May 2009 46	Wycombe Wanderers	1–2	Notts County	High Wycombe
	McCracken 25'		Thompson 30', 90'	Stadium: Adams Park; Attendance: 9,625

=== FA Cup ===
10 November 2008 Round 1	AFC Wimbledon	1–4	Wycombe Wanderers	London
	Hatton 56'		Harrold 9', 36', 74'; Phillips 62'	Stadium: Kingsmeadow; Attendance: 4,528

29 November 2008 Round 2	Eastwood Town	2–0	Wycombe Wanderers	Eastwood
	Meikle 34'; Knox 90'			Stadium: Coronation Park; Attendance: 1,955

=== Football League Cup ===
13 August 2008 Round 1	Wycombe Wanderers	0–4	Birmingham City	Wycombe
			Nafti 14'; O'Connor 64'; Jerome 73'; Owusu-Abeyie 86'	Stadium: Adams Park; Attendance: 2,735

=== Football League Trophy ===
2 September 2008 Southern Section Round 2	Wycombe Wanderers	0–7	Shrewsbury Town	Wycombe
			Holt 12', 27', 80', 81', 86'; McIntyre 39'; Cansdell-Sherriff 74'	Stadium: Adams Park; Attendance: 1,730

== Season squad ==
Note: Flags indicate national team as defined under FIFA eligibility rules; some limited exceptions apply. Players may hold more than one non-FIFA nationality.

No.	Pos.	Nation	Player
1	GK	SCO	Scott Shearer
2	DF	ENG	Lewis Hunt
3	DF	ENG	Craig Woodman
4	MF	GRN	Leon Johnson
5	DF	GHA	Will Antwi
6	DF	ENG	Luke Oliver
7	DF	SCO	David McCracken
8	MF	NIR	Tommy Doherty
9	FW	ENG	Matt Harrold
10	MF	SCO	Matt Bloomfield
11	FW	ENG	Chris Zebroski
12	GK	ENG	Jamie Young
13	DF	JAM	Frank Sinclair
15	MF	SCO	Gary Holt
16	FW	USA	Jon-Paul Pittman
17	FW	ENG	Scott McGleish
18	FW	ENG	Gavin Grant
19	MF	ENG	Lewwis Spence
20	MF	ENG	John Mousinho

No.	Pos.	Nation	Player
21	DF	ENG	Robert Rice
22	DF	ENG	Nathan Ashton
23	FW	BRA	Magno Vieira
24	FW	ENG	Stuart Beavon (on loan from Weymouth)
26	DF	ENG	Leon Crooks
27	FW	ENG	John Akinde (on loan from Bristol City)
28	MF	ENG	Lee Sawyer (on from Chelsea)
29	MF	ENG	Matt Richards
30	DF	ENG	TJ Moncur
31	GK	CZE	Marek Štěch
32	FW	ENG	Dan Fitchett
33	DF	ENG	Darrell Ellams
34	MF	ENG	Scott Shulton
35	MF	ENG	Eddie Savage
36	DF	ENG	Jamie Turley
37	FW	ENG	Calum Botham
38	MF	ENG	Matt Phillips
39	GK	ENG	Ashlee Jones
40	MF	ENG	Junior Lewis

=== Players who left during the season ===
Note: Flags indicate national team as defined under FIFA eligibility rules; some limited exceptions apply. Players may hold more than one non-FIFA nationality.

No.	Pos.	Nation	Player
16	FW	ENG	John Sutton
9	FW	ENG	Leon Knight
16	MF	WAL	Simon Church (on loan from Reading)
27	MF	BEL	Franck Moussa (on loan from Southend United)
29	MF	JAM	Craig Dobson

No.	Pos.	Nation	Player
25	DF	ENG	Lewis Christon
24	MF	ENG	Derek Duncan
6	DF	ENG	Mike Williamson
28	FW	COL	Ángelo Balanta (on loan from Queens Park Rangers)
25	DF	NIR	Chris Casement (on loan from Ipswich Town)
