= Akinde =

- Gender: Male
- Language: Yoruba

Origin
- Origin: Nigeria
- Meaning: The valiant one arrives.
- Region of origin: South West, Nigeria

Akíndé is a Nigerian given and surname of Yoruba origin, typically bestowed upon males. It means "The valiant one arrives.". Akíndé is a unique and culturally significant name and primarily used among the families of Akín also known as warriors.

== Notable individuals with the name ==
- Adebayo Akinde (born 1946), Nigerian academic and bishop.
- Sam Akinde (born 1993), English semi-professional footballer.
- John Akinde (born 1989), English professional footballer.
- Olalekan Bola (born 1992), Nigerian footballer.
