= Joseph Payne =

Joseph Payne may refer to:

- Joseph Payne (educationalist) (1808–1876), British educationalist
- Joseph Payne (cricketer) (1829–1880), English cricketer
- Joseph Frank Payne (1840–1910), English physician
- Joseph B. Payne (died 1968), American politician from Maryland
- Joe Payne (footballer, born 1914) (1914–1975), British footballer
- Joseph Payne (musician) (1941–2008), British musician
- Joe Payne (musician) (1984–2020), American bassist
- Joe Payne (footballer, born 1999), English footballer
