= 2016–17 EFL League Two =

EFL League Two
- Season: 2016–17
- Champions: Portsmouth
- Promoted: Portsmouth; Plymouth Argyle; Doncaster Rovers; Blackpool
- Relegated: Hartlepool United; Leyton Orient
- Matches: 552
- Goals: 1,465 (2.65 per match)
- Top goalscorer: John Akinde; John Marquis (26 goals each)
- Biggest home win: Stevenage 6–1 Hartlepool; Yeovil 5–0 Crawley; Crewe 5–0 Grimsby; Accrington 5–0 Leyton Orient; Plymouth 6–1 Newport County; Portsmouth 6–1 Cheltenham
- Biggest away win: Hartlepool 0–5 Cambridge
- Longest winning run: 7 matches (Exeter City)
- Longest unbeaten run: 15 matches (Accrington Stanley, Carlisle United)
- Longest winless run: 13 matches (Notts County)
- Longest losing run: 10 matches (Notts County)
- Highest attendance: Portsmouth 1–1 Plymouth Argyle (18,644)
- Average attendance: 4,751
- All statistics correct as of 28 May 2017.

The 2016–17 EFL League Two (referred to as the Sky Bet League Two for sponsorship reasons) is the 13th season of the Football League Two under its current title and the 24th season under its current league division format. The fixtures were announced on 22 June 2016.

== Team changes ==
=== To League Two ===
Promoted from National League

- Cheltenham Town
- Grimsby Town

Relegated from League One

- Doncaster Rovers
- Blackpool
- Colchester United
- Crewe Alexandra

=== From League Two ===
Promoted to League One

- Northampton Town
- Oxford United
- Bristol Rovers
- AFC Wimbledon

Relegated to National League

- Dagenham & Redbridge
- York City

== Teams ==
Locations of the 2016–17 Football League Two teams

Club	Location	Stadium	Capacity
Accrington Stanley	Accrington	Crown Ground	5,057
Barnet	London (Edgware)	The Hive Stadium	6,418
Blackpool	Blackpool	Bloomfield Road	16,750
Cambridge United	Cambridge	Abbey Stadium	8,127
Carlisle United	Carlisle	Brunton Park	17,149
Cheltenham Town	Cheltenham	Whaddon Road	7,066
Colchester United	Colchester	Colchester Community Stadium	10,105
Crawley Town	Crawley	Broadfield Stadium	5,996
Crewe Alexandra	Crewe	Gresty Road	10,180
Doncaster Rovers	Doncaster	Keepmoat Stadium	15,231
Exeter City	Exeter	St James Park	8,830
Grimsby Town	Cleethorpes	Blundell Park	9,052
Hartlepool United	Hartlepool	Victoria Park	7,833
Leyton Orient	London (Leyton)	Brisbane Road	9,271
Luton Town	Luton	Kenilworth Road	10,226
Mansfield Town	Mansfield	Field Mill	9,846
Morecambe	Morecambe	Globe Arena	6,476
Newport County	Newport	Rodney Parade	7,850
Notts County	Nottingham	Meadow Lane	19,588
Plymouth Argyle	Plymouth	Home Park	17,441
Portsmouth	Portsmouth	Fratton Park	21,100
Stevenage	Stevenage	Broadhall Way	6,722
Wycombe Wanderers	High Wycombe	Adams Park	10,300
Yeovil Town	Yeovil	Huish Park	9,665

== Managerial changes ==
Team	Outgoing manager	Manner of departure	Date of vacancy	Position in table	Incoming manager	Date of appointment
Blackpool	(England) Neil McDonald	Sacked	18 May 2016	Pre-season	(England) Gary Bowyer	1 June 2016
Leyton Orient	(England) Andy Hessenthaler	Sacked	26 September 2016	14th	(Italy) Alberto Cavasin	2 October 2016
Newport County	(Northern Ireland) Warren Feeney	Sacked	28 September 2016	24th	(England) Graham Westley	10 October 2016
Grimsby Town	(England) Paul Hurst	Hired by Shrewsbury Town	24 October 2016	8th	(England) Marcus Bignot	7 November 2016
Mansfield Town	(England) Adam Murray	Resigned	14 November 2016	18th	(Scotland) Steve Evans	16 November 2016
Leyton Orient	(Italy) Alberto Cavasin	Sacked	23 November 2016	22nd	(England) Andy Edwards	23 November 2016
Barnet	(England) Martin Allen	Hired by Eastleigh	1 December 2016	8th	(England) Kevin Nugent	15 February 2017
Notts County	(Republic of Ireland) John Sheridan	Sacked	2 January 2017	22nd	(England) Kevin Nolan	12 January 2017
Crewe Alexandra	(England) Steve Davis	Sacked	8 January 2017	18th	(Gibraltar) David Artell	8 January 2017
Hartlepool United	(England) Craig Hignett	Mutual consent	15 January 2017	19th	(England) Dave Jones	18 January 2017
Leyton Orient	(England) Andy Edwards	Hired by the Football Association	29 January 2017	23rd	(England) Danny Webb	29 January 2017
Newport County	(England) Graham Westley	Sacked	9 March 2017	24th	(Wales) Mike Flynn	9 May 2017
Leyton Orient	(England) Danny Webb	Resigned	30 March 2017	24th	(England) Steve Davis	10 July 2017
Grimsby Town	(England) Marcus Bignot	Sacked	10 April 2017	14th	(England) Russell Slade	12 April 2017
Barnet	(England) Kevin Nugent	Sacked	15 April 2017	16th	(England) Rossi Eames	19 May 2017
Hartlepool United	(England) Dave Jones	Sacked	24 April 2017	23rd	(England) Craig Harrison	26 May 2017
Crawley Town	(England) Dermot Drummy	Mutual consent	4 May 2017	21st	(Australia) Harry Kewell	23 May 2017

== League table ==
Pos	Team	Pld	W	D	L	GF	GA	GD	Pts	Promotion, qualification or relegation
1	Portsmouth (C, P)	46	26	9	11	79	40	+39	87	Promotion to EFL League One
2	Plymouth Argyle (P)	46	26	9	11	71	46	+25	87	Promotion to EFL League One
3	Doncaster Rovers (P)	46	25	10	11	85	55	+30	85	Promotion to EFL League One
4	Luton Town	46	20	17	9	70	43	+27	77	Qualification for League Two play-offs (Note: Four teams play for one spot and promotion to EFL League One)
5	Exeter City	46	21	8	17	75	56	+19	71	Qualification for League Two play-offs
6	Carlisle United	46	18	17	11	69	68	+1	71	Qualification for League Two play-offs
7	Blackpool (O, P)	46	18	16	12	69	46	+23	70	Qualification for League Two play-offs
8	Colchester United	46	19	12	15	67	57	+10	69	
9	Wycombe Wanderers	46	19	12	15	58	53	+5	69	
10	Stevenage	46	20	7	19	67	63	+4	67	
11	Cambridge United	46	19	9	18	58	50	+8	66	
12	Mansfield Town	46	17	15	14	54	50	+4	66	
13	Accrington Stanley	46	17	14	15	59	56	+3	65	
14	Grimsby Town	46	17	11	18	59	63	−4	62	
15	Barnet	46	14	15	17	57	64	−7	57	
16	Notts County	46	16	8	22	54	76	−22	56	
17	Crewe Alexandra	46	14	13	19	58	67	−9	55	
18	Morecambe	46	14	10	22	53	73	−20	52	
19	Crawley Town	46	13	12	21	53	71	−18	51	
20	Yeovil Town	46	11	17	18	49	64	−15	50	
21	Cheltenham Town	46	12	14	20	49	69	−20	50	
22	Newport County	46	12	12	22	51	73	−22	48	
23	Hartlepool United (R)	46	11	13	22	54	75	−21	46	Relegation to the National League
24	Leyton Orient (R)	46	10	6	30	47	87	−40	36	Relegation to the National League

Updated to match(es) played on 6 May 2017. Source: BBC Sport
Rules for classification: 1) Points; 2) Goal difference; 3) Number of goals scored
(C) Champions; (O) Play-off winners; (P) Promoted; (R) Relegated

== Play-offs ==
Semifinals
4	Luton Town	2	3	5
7	Blackpool	3	3	6
5	Exeter City	3	3	6
6	Carlisle United	3	2	5

Final
7	Blackpool	2
5	Exeter City	1

== Results ==
Home \ Away	ACC	BAR	BLP	CAM	CRL	CHL	COL	CRA	CRE	DON	EXE	GRI	HAR	LEY	LUT	MAN	MOR	NPC	NTC	PLY	POR	STE	WYC	YEO
Accrington Stanley		1–0	2–1	2–0	1–1	1–1	2–1	1–0	3–2	3–2	1–2	1–1	2–2	5–0	1–4	1–1	2–3	1–3	2–0	0–1	1–0	0–1	2–2	1–1
Barnet	2–0		1–1	0–1	0–1	3–1	1–1	2–2	0–0	1–3	1–4	3–1	3–2	0–0	0–1	0–2	2–2	0–0	3–2	1–0	1–1	1–2	0–2	2–2
Blackpool	0–0	2–2		1–1	2–2	3–0	1–1	0–0	2–2	4–2	2–0	1–3	2–1	3–1	0–2	0–1	3–1	4–1	4–0	0–1	3–1	1–0	0–0	2–2
Cambridge United	2–1	1–1	0–0		2–2	3–1	1–1	2–0	2–1	2–3	1–0	0–1	0–1	3–0	0–3	1–3	1–2	3–2	4–0	0–1	0–1	0–0	1–2	1–0
Carlisle United	1–1	1–1	1–4	0–3		1–1	2–0	3–1	0–2	2–1	3–2	1–3	3–2	2–2	0–0	5–2	1–1	2–1	1–2	1–0	0–3	1–1	1–0	2–1
Cheltenham Town	3–0	1–2	2–2	0–1	1–0		0–3	2–1	2–0	0–1	1–3	2–1	1–0	1–1	1–1	0–0	3–1	1–1	2–3	1–2	1–1	0–0	0–1	2–0
Colchester United	1–2	2–1	3–2	2–0	4–1	2–0		2–3	4–0	1–1	2–3	3–2	2–1	0–3	2–1	2–0	2–2	0–0	2–1	0–0	0–4	4–0	1–0	2–0
Crawley Town	0–0	1–1	1–0	1–3	3–3	0–0	1–1		0–3	0–0	1–2	3–2	1–0	3–0	2–0	2–2	1–3	3–1	1–3	1–2	0–2	1–2	1–0	2–0
Crewe Alexandra	0–1	4–1	1–1	1–2	1–1	0–0	2–0	0–2		2–1	2–0	5–0	3–3	3–0	1–2	1–1	2–1	1–2	2–2	1–2	0–0	1–2	2–1	0–1
Doncaster Rovers	2–2	3–2	0–1	1–0	2–2	2–0	1–0	1–1	3–1		1–3	1–0	2–1	3–1	1–1	1–0	1–1	2–0	3–1	0–1	3–1	1–0	2–2	4–1
Exeter City	0–2	2–1	2–2	1–2	2–3	3–0	3–0	0–1	4–0	1–3		0–0	1–2	4–0	0–0	2–0	3–1	0–1	0–2	0–2	0–1	1–1	4–2	3–3
Grimsby Town	2–0	2–2	0–0	2–1	2–2	0–1	1–0	1–1	0–2	1–5	0–3		0–3	1–2	1–1	3–0	2–0	1–0	2–0	1–1	0–1	5–2	1–2	4–2
Hartlepool United	2–0	0–2	0–1	0–5	1–1	2–0	1–1	1–1	4–0	2–1	3–1	0–1		1–3	1–1	0–0	3–2	2–2	1–2	1–1	0–2	2–0	0–2	1–1
Leyton Orient	1–0	1–3	1–2	1–1	1–2	0–1	1–3	3–2	0–2	1–4	0–1	0–3	2–1		1–2	1–2	0–1	0–1	2–3	0–2	0–1	3–0	0–2	0–1
Luton Town	1–0	3–1	1–0	2–0	1–1	2–3	0–1	2–1	1–1	3–1	1–1	1–2	3–0	2–2		1–1	3–1	2–1	2–1	1–1	1–3	0–2	4–1	1–1
Mansfield Town	4–4	0–1	1–0	0–0	2–0	1–1	0–0	3–1	3–0	1–1	1–2	0–1	4–0	2–0	1–1		0–1	2–1	3–1	0–2	0–1	1–2	1–1	1–0
Morecambe	1–2	0–1	2–1	2–0	0–3	1–2	1–1	2–3	0–0	1–5	0–3	1–0	1–1	1–2	0–2	1–3		0–1	4–1	2–1	2–0	0–2	1–1	1–3
Newport County	1–0	2–2	1–3	1–2	2–0	2–2	1–1	1–0	1–1	0–0	1–4	0–0	3–1	0–4	1–1	2–3	1–1		2–1	1–3	2–3	0–2	0–1	1–0
Notts County	0–2	1–0	1–0	0–1	2–3	2–1	3–1	2–1	1–1	0–1	2–2	2–2	2–1	3–1	0–0	0–0	1–2	0–3		1–2	1–3	1–1	0–2	0–0
Plymouth Argyle	0–1	0–2	0–3	2–1	2–0	1–0	2–1	2–0	2–1	2–0	3–0	0–3	1–1	2–3	0–3	2–0	1–0	6–1	0–1		2–2	4–2	3–3	4–1
Portsmouth	2–0	5–1	2–0	2–1	1–1	6–1	2–0	3–0	0–1	1–2	0–1	4–0	0–0	2–1	1–0	4–0	1–1	2–1	1–2	1–1		1–2	4–2	3–1
Stevenage	0–3	1–0	0–2	1–2	1–2	2–1	2–4	2–1	1–2	3–4	0–2	2–0	6–1	4–1	2–1	0–1	0–1	3–1	3–0	1–2	3–0		3–0	2–2
Wycombe Wanderers	1–1	0–2	0–0	1–0	1–2	3–3	0–2	1–2	5–1	2–1	1–0	2–1	2–0	1–0	1–1	0–1	2–0	2–1	0–1	1–1	1–0	1–0		1–1
Yeovil Town	1–1	0–1	0–3	1–1	0–2	4–2	2–1	5–0	3–0	0–3	0–0	0–0	1–2	1–1	0–4	0–0	0–1	1–0	2–0	2–1	0–0	1–1	1–0	

Updated to match(es) played on 6 May 2017. Source: BBC Sport
Legend: Blue = home team win; Yellow = draw; Red = away team win.

== Top goalscorers ==
Source: BBC Sport
Correct as of 28 May 2017

Rank	Player	Club	Goals
1	(England) John Akinde	Barnet	26
1	(England) John Marquis	Doncaster Rovers	26
3	(England) Danny Hylton	Luton Town	22
4	(England) Matt Godden	Stevenage	20
4	(Republic of Ireland) James Collins	Crawley Town	20
6	(England) Omar Bogle	Grimsby Town	19
6	(England) David Wheeler	Exeter City	19
8	(England) Luke Berry	Cambridge United	17
9	(England) Chris Porter	Colchester United	16
10	(England) Ollie Watkins	Exeter City	15

== Monthly Awards ==
Month	Manager of the Month		Player of the Month		Reference
Month	Manager	Club	Player	Club	Reference
August	(England) Jim Bentley	Morecambe	(England) James Coppinger	Doncaster Rovers	
September	(Scotland) Derek Adams	Plymouth Argyle	(England) Jon Stead	Notts County	
October	(England) Keith Curle	Carlisle United	(England) Jason Kennedy	Carlisle United	
November	(England) Gareth Ainsworth	Wycombe Wanderers	(England) Omar Bogle	Grimsby Town	
December	(England) John McGreal	Colchester United	(England) Scott Kashket	Wycombe Wanderers	
January	(Scotland) Darren Ferguson	Doncaster Rovers	(England) Ollie Watkins	Exeter City	
February	(England) Darren Sarll	Stevenage	(England) Matt Godden	Stevenage	
March	(England) John Coleman	Accrington Stanley	(Northern Ireland) Shay McCartan	Accrington Stanley	
April	(England) Paul Cook	Portsmouth	(England) Mickey Demetriou	Newport County	

== Attendances ==
#	Football club	Home games	Average attendance
1	Portsmouth FC	23	16,823
2	Plymouth Argyle	23	9,652
3	Luton Town	23	8,046
4	Doncaster Rovers	23	6,021
5	Notts County	23	5,970
6	Grimsby Town	23	5,259
7	Carlisle United	23	5,114
8	Cambridge United	23	4,737
9	Leyton Orient	23	4,663
10	Exeter City	23	4,166
11	Colchester United	23	3,973
12	Wycombe Wanderers	23	3,917
13	Crewe Alexandra	23	3,882
14	Hartlepool United	23	3,788
15	Mansfield Town	23	3,774
16	Yeovil Town	23	3,567
17	Blackpool FC	23	3,456
18	Cheltenham Town	23	3,323
19	Stevenage FC	23	2,899
20	Newport County	23	2,861
21	Crawley Town	23	2,492
22	Barnet FC	23	2,260
23	Morecambe FC	23	1,703
24	Accrington Stanley	23	1,699
