= Robert Rice =

Robert Rice may refer to:

- Robert Rice (footballer) (born 1989), English footballer
- Robert Rice (coach), American college football and college basketball coach
- Robert H. Rice (1903–1994), American submarine commander
- Henry Burr (1882–1941), Canadian singer who used Robert Rice as a pseudonym
- Robert L. Rice (1929–2007), health club pioneer and philanthropist
- Robert V. Rice (1924–2020), American biochemist
- Bobby Rice (born 1983), American actor
- Bobby G. Rice (born 1944), American country music singer-songwriter
