= Joe Payne (footballer, born 1999) =

English footballer

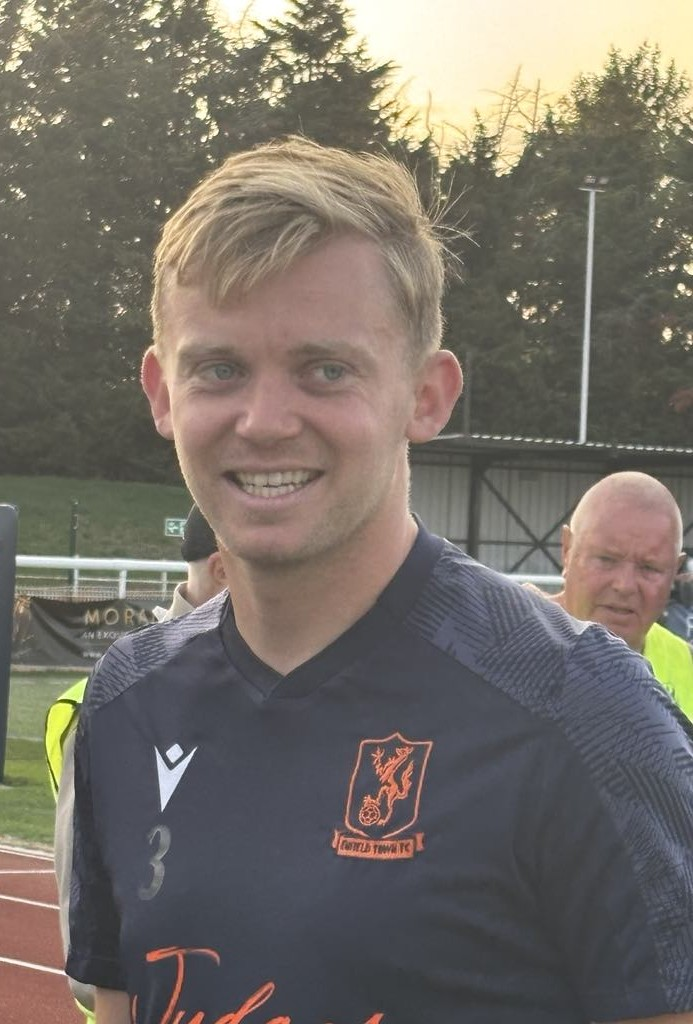
- Joe Payne in 2025.

Personal information
- Full name: Joseph William Payne
- Date of birth: 2 April 1999 (age 27)
- Place of birth: Enfield, England
- Height: 1.91 m (6 ft 3 in)
- Position: Defender

Team information
- Current team: Bedford Town

Youth career
- 2005–2010: Wormley Rovers
- 2010–2017: Barnet

Senior career*
Years	Team	Apps	(Gls)
2016–2019	Barnet	7	(0)
2017	→ Grays Athletic (loan)	15	(0)
2017	→ Solihull Moors (loan)	3	(0)
2018	→ Wealdstone (loan)	5	(0)
2019	→ Enfield Town (loan)	9	(1)
2019–2020	Enfield Town	36	(2)
2020–2021	Potters Bar Town	14	(1)
2021–2022	Concord Rangers	34	(2)
2022	Cheshunt	2	(0)
2022–2025	Enfield Town	97	(2)
2025	→ Potters Bar Town (loan)	11	(1)
2025	Potters Bar Town	16	(1)
2025–	Bedford Town	1	(0)
- * Club domestic league appearances and goals as of 19:38, 31 December 2025 (UTC)

Joseph William Payne (born 2 April 1999) is an English footballer who plays for Bedford Town.

== Career ==
Payne joined Barnet in 2010 from Wormley Rovers as an under-12. He made his debut for the senior team aged 17 when he came on as a substitute for Sam Muggleton in an EFL Trophy game against Peterborough United on 8 November 2016. Later that month, Payne scored from the halfway line in a Middlesex Senior Cup game against Enfield Town. He joined Grays Athletic on loan on 13 January 2017, and went on to make 15 appearances in the Isthmian League Premier Division. The following season, Payne joined Solihull Moors on loan in September. Payne also received man of the match on his debut for the club. He made his full Barnet debut on his 19th birthday away to Stevenage. Payne joined Wealdstone on loan on 2 November 2018. He then joined Enfield Town on loan in March 2019. Payne left the Bees at the end of the 2018–19 season.

He then re-joined Enfield Town permanently in July 2019. Payne joined Potters Bar Town for the 2020–21 season.

He signed for Concord Rangers in February 2021, making his debut in the 2020 FA Trophy Final. Payne joined Cheshunt at the start of the 2022–23 season before re-joining Enfield Town.

== Career statistics ==
As of 28 January 2023

Club	Season	League			FA Cup		League Cup		Other		Total	
Club	Season	Division	Apps	Goals	Apps	Goals	Apps	Goals	Apps	Goals	Apps	Goals
Barnet	2016–17	League Two	0	0	0	0	0	0	1 (Note: Appearance in the Football League Trophy)	0	1	0
Barnet	2017–18	League Two	3	0	0	0	0	0	0	0	3	0
Barnet	2018–19	National League	4	0	0	0	0	0	0	0	4	0
Barnet	Total		7	0	0	0	0	0	1	0	8	0
Grays Athletic (loan)	2016–17	Isthmian League Premier Division	15	0	0	0	0	0	0	0	15	0
Solihull Moors (loan)	2017–18	National League	3	0	0	0	0	0	0	0	3	0
Wealdstone (loan)	2018–19	National League South	5	0	0	0	0	0	0	0	5	0
Enfield Town (loan)	2018–19	Isthmian League Premier Division	5	1	0	0	0	0	1 (Note: Appearance in the Alan Turvey Trophy)	0	6	1
Enfield Town	2019–20	Isthmian League Premier Division	27	2	3	0	0	0	7 (Note: Five appearances in the FA Trophy, one appearance in the Middlesex Senior Cup, one appearance in the Alan Turvey Trophy)	0	37	2
Potters Bar Town	2020–21	Isthmian League Premier Division	9	1	2	0	0	0	1 (Note: Appearance in the FA Trophy)	0	12	1
Concord Rangers	2020–21	National League South	0	0	0	0	0	0	1	0	1	0
Concord Rangers	2021–22	National League South	34	2	2	0	0	0	1	0	37	2
Concord Rangers	Total		34	2	2	0	0	0	2	0	38	2
Cheshunt	2022–23	National League South	2	0	0	0	0	0	0	0	2	0
Enfield Town	2022–23	Isthmian League Premier Division	37	2	0	0	0	0	4 (Note: One appearance in the FA Trophy, one appearance in the Middlesex Senior Cup, two appearances in the Alan Turvey Trophy)	0	24	2
Career total			139	5	0	0	0	11	0	117	4	

== Honours ==
Concord Rangers

- FA Trophy runner-up: 2019–20
