= Curtis Weston =

English footballer (born 1987)

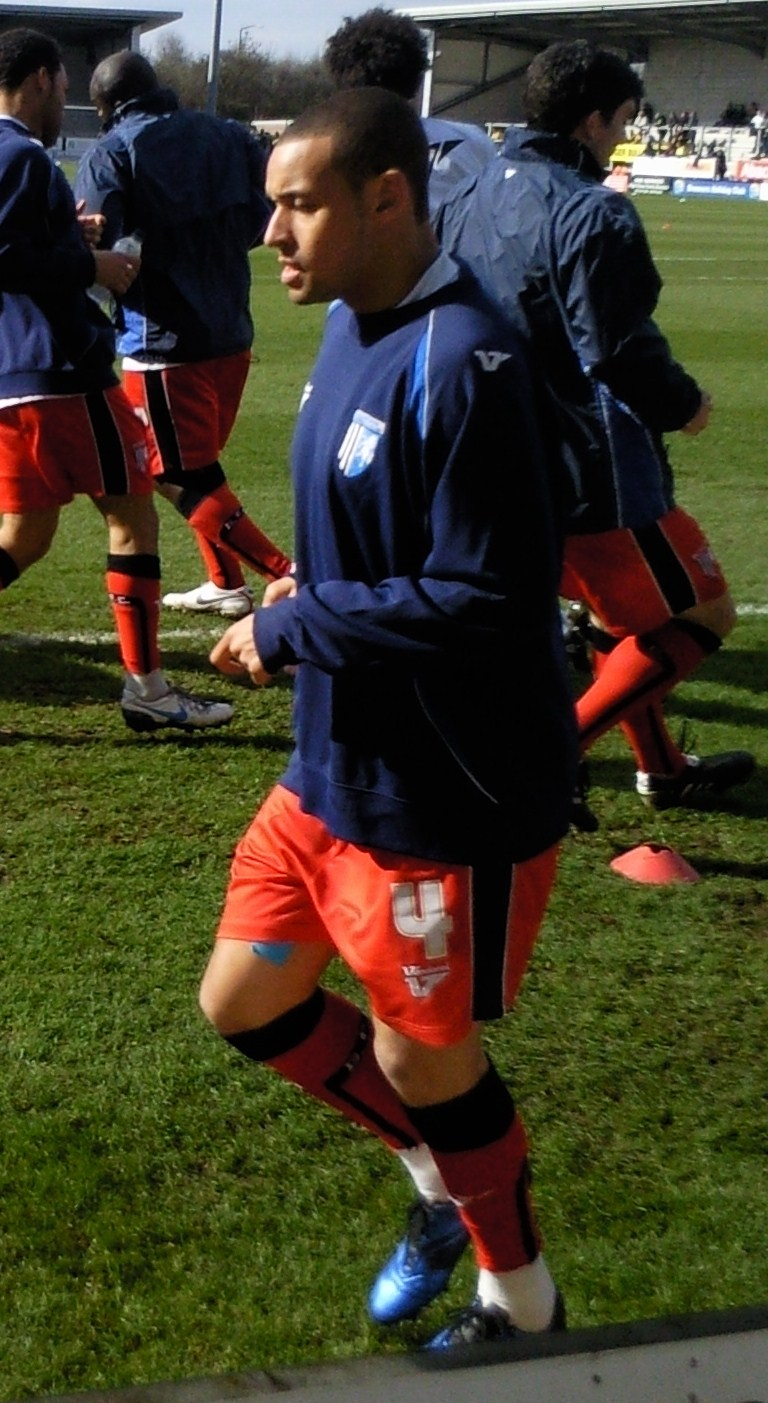
- Weston warming up for Gillingham

Personal information
- Full name: Curtis James Weston
- Date of birth: 24 January 1987 (age 39)
- Place of birth: Greenwich, England
- Height: 5 ft 11 in (1.80 m)
- Position: Midfielder

Youth career
- ?–2004: Millwall

Senior career*
| Years | Team | Apps | (Gls) |
| 2004–2006 | Millwall | 4 | (0) |
| 2006–2007 | Swindon Town | 27 | (1) |
| 2007–2008 | Leeds United | 7 | (1) |
| 2008 | → Scunthorpe United (loan) | 7 | (0) |
| 2008 | → Gillingham (loan) | 3 | (0) |
| 2008–2012 | Gillingham | 144 | (15) |
| 2012–2018 | Barnet | 213 | (23) |
| 2018–2022 | Chesterfield | 147 | (9) |
| 2022–2023 | AFC Fylde | 20 | (0) |
| 2023–2024 | Buxton | 31 | (0) |
| 2024–2025 | Mickleover | 27 | (0) |
- * Club domestic league appearances and goals as of 10:06, 21 February 2026 (UTC)

Curtis James Weston (born 24 January 1987) is an English professional footballer.

== Playing career ==
Born in Greenwich, London, Weston attended Erith Secondary School and was spotted by a Millwall scout when playing for the school team and subsequently joined Millwall's youth academy. In only his second appearance for Millwall's first team, he replaced player-manager Dennis Wise in the 89th minute of the 2004 FA Cup Final against Manchester United to become the youngest FA Cup finalist at the age of 17 years 119 days, beating the 125-year-old record of James F. M. Prinsep. He said, "It's obviously the highlight of my career so far. I supported Manchester United as a kid, so that made it even more special. I didn't get long on the pitch, but I got a few touches. I remember a sliding tackle on Ruud van Nistelrooy and a 50–50 with Nicky Butt. I kept my shirt, and I also got Mikaël Silvestre's".

Weston moved to Swindon Town in July 2006 when Dennis Wise, now managing Swindon, signed him again. Weston finally managed a run of appearances and scored his first professional goal in a game against Bristol Rovers. He was released by Swindon a year later. Weston signed a two-year contract with Leeds United on 7 August 2007, the third time Dennis Wise gave him a contract. He scored his first goal for the club in their 3–0 win over Northampton Town in January 2008, but his time with Leeds was not long. "Gary McAllister (the new Leeds manager after Wise left for Newcastle United), was straight with me. He just told me I wasn't in his plans and I should get myself another club," said Weston later.

Weston signed for Football League Championship team Scunthorpe United on loan in March 2008. In August 2008, Weston joined Gillingham, initially on a one-month loan, before signing a two-year contract. He said, "When the chance came to go to Gillingham, I grabbed it. ...Being from the area, I knew the club and the setup were good. It was the chance to move back to where my family is, and to play regular games". He made his Gillingham debut away to AFC Bournemouth on 9 August 2008, and scored his first goal for the club on 28 December 2008 against Wycombe Wanderers.

Weston signed for Barnet on 13 August 2012, but saw a lack of first-team action at first due to the arrival of John Oster and Edgar Davids soon afterwards. However, he played a prevalent role in Barnet's last fixtures of the season, starting their last game at Underhill, with his shot from outside the box hitting the post. He started the final game of the season against Northampton Town, which Barnet went on to lose 2–0, thus relegating them to the Conference. Weston spent six seasons with the Bees, during which he held the captaincy and won the Conference Premier title in 2014–15. On 24 May 2018, it was confirmed that Weston had agreed to join Chesterfield for the 2018–19 season. In four seasons, he scored nine goals in 161 appearances for the Spireites. Weston joined AFC Fylde for the 2022–23 season. In the summer of 2023, he signed for Buxton.

In July 2024, Weston joined Northern Premier League Premier Division side Mickleover.

== Personal life ==
Weston is married with three children. Aside from his football career, he works full-time in audit recruitment.

== Career statistics ==
As of the end of the 2023–24 season

Appearances and goals by club, season and competition
| Club | Season | League | | | FA Cup | | League Cup | | Other | | Total | |
| Club | Season | Division | Apps | Goals | Apps | Goals | Apps | Goals | Apps | Goals | Apps | Goals |
|---|---|---|---|---|---|---|---|---|---|---|---|---|
| Millwall | 2003–04 | First Division | 1 | 0 | 1 | 0 | — | | — | | 2 | 0 |
| Millwall | 2004–05 | Championship | 3 | 0 | 1 | 0 | — | | — | | 4 | 0 |
| Millwall | 2005–06 | Championship | 0 | 0 | — | | — | | — | | 0 | 0 |
| Millwall | Total | | 4 | 0 | 2 | 0 | 0 | 0 | 0 | 0 | 6 | 0 |
| Swindon Town | 2006–07 | League Two | 27 | 1 | 2 | 0 | 1 | 0 | 1 (Note: Appearances in EFL Trophy) | 0 | 31 | 1 |
| Leeds United | 2007–08 | League One | 7 | 1 | 2 | 0 | 1 | 0 | 1 | 0 | 11 | 1 |
| Scunthorpe United | 2007–08 | Championship | 7 | 0 | — | | — | | — | | 7 | 0 |
| Gillingham | 2008–09 | League Two | 45 | 5 | 4 | 0 | — | | 3 (Note: Appearances in Football League Two playoffs) | 0 | 52 | 5 |
| Gillingham | 2009–10 | League One | 39 | 6 | 3 | 2 | 2 | 0 | — | | 44 | 8 |
| Gillingham | 2010–11 | League Two | 33 | 4 | 0 | 0 | 0 | 0 | — | | 33 | 4 |
| Gillingham | 2011–12 | League Two | 30 | 0 | 3 | 2 | 1 | 0 | 1 | 0 | 35 | 2 |
| Gillingham | Total | | 147 | 15 | 10 | 4 | 3 | 0 | 4 | 0 | 164 | 19 |
| Barnet | 2012–13 | League Two | 29 | 0 | 1 | 0 | 1 | 0 | — | | 31 | 0 |
| Barnet | 2013–14 | Conference Premier | 39 | 4 | 1 | 0 | 0 | 0 | 2 (Note: Appearances in FA Trophy) | 0 | 42 | 4 |
| Barnet | 2014–15 | Conference Premier | 46 | 9 | 3 | 1 | — | | — | | 49 | 10 |
| Barnet | 2015–16 | League Two | 37 | 3 | 1 | 0 | 2 | 0 | 1 | 0 | 41 | 3 |
| Barnet | 2016–17 | League Two | 40 | 6 | 1 | 0 | 1 | 0 | 1 | 1 | 43 | 7 |
| Barnet | 2017–18 | League Two | 22 | 1 | 0 | 0 | 0 | 0 | 0 | 0 | 22 | 1 |
| Barnet | Total | | 213 | 23 | 7 | 1 | 4 | 0 | 4 | 1 | 228 | 25 |
| Chesterfield | 2018–19 | National League | 43 | 2 | 4 | 0 | — | | 2 | 0 | 49 | 2 |
| Chesterfield | 2019–20 | National League | 32 | 6 | 1 | 0 | — | | 1 | 0 | 34 | 6 |
| Chesterfield | 2020–21 | National League | 37 | 0 | 1 | 0 | — | | 2 | 0 | 40 | 0 |
| Chesterfield | 2021–22 | National League | 35 | 1 | 3 | 0 | — | | 0 | 0 | 38 | 1 |
| Chesterfield | Total | | 147 | 9 | 9 | 0 | 0 | 0 | 5 | 0 | 161 | 9 |
| AFC Fylde | 2022–23 | National League North | 20 | 0 | 7 | 0 | — | | 1 | 0 | 28 | 0 |
| Buxton | 2023–24 | National League North | 31 | 0 | 1 | 0 | — | | 1 | 0 | 33 | 0 |
| Career total | | | 605 | 49 | 40 | 5 | 9 | 0 | 17 | 1 | 672 | 55 |

== Honours ==
Millwall

- FA Cup runner-up: 2003–04

Gillingham

- Football League Two play-offs: 2009

Barnet

- Conference Premier: 2014–15
