= Henry Newman (football coach) =

English football coach (born 1989)

Personal information
- Full name: Henry John Newman
- Date of birth: 17 September 1989 (age 37)
- Place of birth: Birmingham, England

Managerial career
- Years: Team
- 2016–2017: Barnet (interim)

Henry John Newman (born 1989) is first-team assistant coach at West Ham United.

== Career ==
Newman joined Barnet in 2009 as assistant coach for the under-18s team while completing a degree in economics and philosophy at the London School of Economics. Newman achieved five "A" grades at A Level.

Newman left Barnet in 2011 to become under-15s coach at Charlton Athletic. He later coached at Brentford before re-joining Barnet in 2014 to become the youngest academy manager in the country.

He was appointed joint interim manager at Barnet on 1 December 2016, alongside Rossi Eames. Eames took sole charge for a win over Morecambe on 14 February 2017 and, the following day, Newman's departure from the club was announced.

In August 2019, Newman, along with business partner Rory Campbell, made a bid to purchase Bury through their company C&N Sporting Risk shortly before the club's deadline to show proof of funds to the English Football League. This bid fell through and Bury were expelled from the EFL.

== West Ham ==
Newman has been at West Ham United since January 2020, working as part of David Moyes’s backroom staff on opposition analysis and match preparation. He was made a first team assistant for the 2023–24 season.

== Managerial statistics ==
As of 15 February 2017

Managerial record by team and tenure
Team	Nat	From	To	Record							
Team	Nat	From	To	G	W	D	L	GF	GA	GD	Win %
Barnet (interim)	(England)	1 December 2016	15 February 2017	11	4	2	5	12	15	−3	36.36
Total				11	4	2	5	12	15	−3	36.36
