= Sam Muggleton =

English footballer

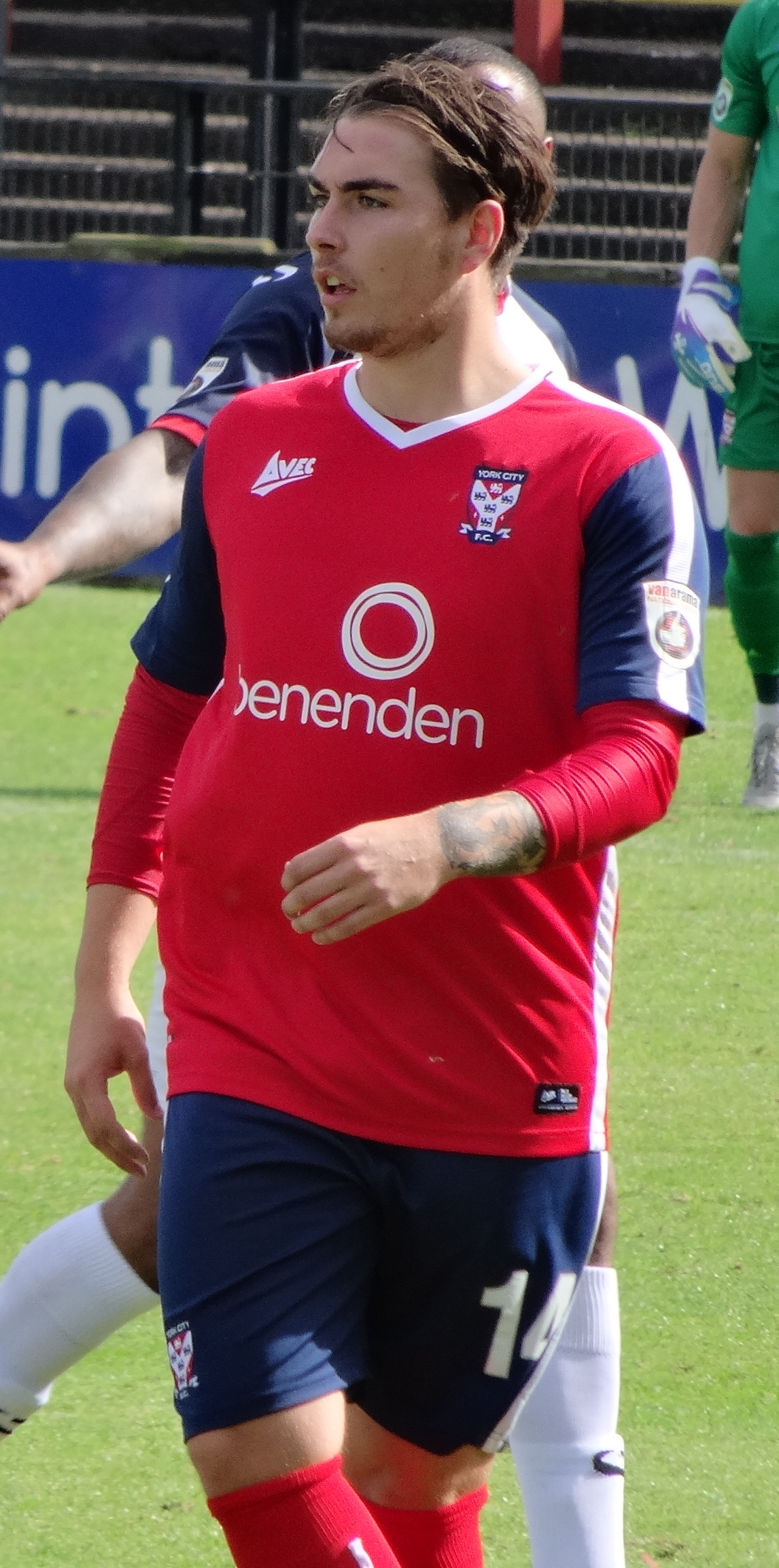
- Muggleton playing for York City in 2017

Personal information
- Full name: Samuel Alexander Muggleton
- Date of birth: 17 November 1995 (age 30)
- Place of birth: Melton Mowbray, England
- Height: 5 ft 11 in (1.80 m)
- Positions: Defender; midfielder

Team information
- Current team: Grantham Town

Youth career
- Leicester City
- 20??–2012: Holwell Sports

Senior career*
Years	Team	Apps	(Gls)
2012	Holwell Sports	5	(0)
2012–2014	Gillingham	2	(0)
2014	→ Barnet (loan)	6	(0)
2014–2017	Barnet	52	(1)
2017	Eastleigh	5	(0)
2017–2018	York City	16	(0)
2017	→ Boston United (loan)	6	(0)
2018	→ Scarborough Athletic (loan)		
2018–2019	Chesterfield	18	(0)
2019	→ Darlington (loan)	2	(0)
2020–2021	Stratford Town	4	(0)
2021	Melton Town	7	(0)
2021–2022	Bedworth United	16	(0)
2022	Belper Town	8	(0)
2022	Quorn	3	(1)
2022–2023	Melton Town	21	(3)
2023	Farsley Celtic	7	(0)
2023	→ Leicester St Andrews (loan)	4	(0)
2023–	Grantham Town	49	(5)
- * Club domestic league appearances and goals as of 09:19, 2 February 2025 (UTC)

Samuel Alexander Muggleton (born 17 November 1995) is an English footballer who plays as a defender or midfielder for Grantham Town.

== Career ==
=== Early career ===
Muggleton was born in Melton Mowbray, Leicestershire and is the son of former footballer Carl Muggleton. He played for his local team Syston before joining Leicester City. He played for Leicester for several seasons at various youth levels before being released, being told he was too short. After this, he joined Holwell Sports, where he played for the first team in the East Midlands Counties League.

Aged 16, he signed a two-year scholarship with Gillingham in November 2012. He made his first-team debut for Gillingham on the final day of the 2012–13 season, starting in a 3–2 away defeat to Burton Albion, as they were crowned champions of League Two.

Muggleton joined Conference Premier club Barnet on 27 March 2014 on loan until the end of 2013–14. After making six appearances, he returned to Gillingham. He was released by Gillingham at the end of 2013–14, signing for Barnet permanently on 16 May 2014.

=== Non-league ===
On 17 January 2017, Muggleton signed for National League club Eastleigh for an undisclosed fee.

On 20 March 2017, Muggleton signed for Eastleigh's National League rivals York City on a contract until the end of 2016–17. He joined York's National League North rivals Boston United on 21 October 2017 on a one-month loan. He made his debut the same day, starting in Boston's 2–1 away defeat to Curzon Ashton. Muggleton returned to York after the loan expired, having made six appearances for Boston. On 9 February 2018, he joined Northern Premier League Division One North club Scarborough Athletic on loan for the rest of the 2017–18 season. He made eight appearances as York finished 2017–18 in 11th place in the table. He was released at the end of the season.

Muggleton signed for newly relegated National League club Chesterfield on 31 July 2018 on a one-year contract with the option of a further year. He joined National League North club Darlington on 8 February 2019 on a one-month loan. During his second appearance, he collided with an opponent and suffered a broken femur and three ruptured ligaments and a torn tendon in his left knee. Muggleton was released by Chesterfield at the end of the season.

He played on trial for Kettering Town in September 2020 as he sought to regain full fitness. Later that month he signed for Southern Football League club Stratford Town. The 2020–21 season was again curtailed due to Covid-19 and in the summer of 2021 he dropped down a level to sign for Northern Premier League Division One Midlands side Bedworth United, after a brief spell with Melton Town. He transferred to division rivals in February 2022 when he signed for Belper Town and was a part of the side that beat Chasetown 1–0 in the play-off final to earn promotion to the Premier Division.

In the 2022-23 season, Muggleton played in the United Counties League for Quorn, Melton Town and Leicester St Andrews, as well as Farsley Celtic in the National League North.

He joined Grantham Town for the 2023-24 season.

== Style of play ==
Muggleton plays as a left back or a left midfielder and possesses a long throw-in.

== Career statistics ==
As of match played 11 November 2023

Appearances and goals by club, season and competition
Club	Season	League			FA Cup		League Cup		Other		Total	
Club	Season	Division	Apps	Goals	Apps	Goals	Apps	Goals	Apps	Goals	Apps	Goals
Holwell Sports	2012–13	East Midlands Counties League	5	0	0	0	0	0	0	0	5	0
Gillingham	2012–13	League Two	1	0	0	0	0	0	0	0	1	0
Gillingham	2013–14	League One	1	0	0	0	0	0	0	0	1	0
Gillingham	Total		2	0	0	0	0	0	0	0	2	0
Barnet (loan)	2013–14	Conference Premier	6	0	—		—		—		6	0
Barnet	2014–15	Conference Premier	16	1	0	0	—		2 (Note: Appearances in FA Trophy)	0	18	1
Barnet	2015–16	League Two	23	0	2	0	1	0	1 (Note: Appearance in Football League Trophy)	0	27	0
Barnet	2016–17	League Two	13	0	1	0	0	0	3 (Note: Appearances in EFL Trophy)	0	17	0
Barnet	Total		58	1	3	0	1	0	6	0	68	1
Eastleigh	2016–17	National League	5	0	—		—		—		5	0
York City	2016–17	National League	8	0	—		—		—		8	0
York City	2017–18	National League North	8	0	0	0	—		0	0	8	0
York City	Total		16	0	0	0	—		0	0	16	0
Boston United (loan)	2017–18	National League North	6	0	—		—		—		6	0
Scarborough Athletic (loan)	2017–18	NPL Division One North	No data currently available									
Chesterfield	2018–19	National League	18	0	2	0	—		0	0	20	0
Darlington (loan)	2018–19	National League North	2	0	—		—		—		2	0
Stratford Town	2020–21	SFL Premier Division Central	4	0	2	0	—		—		6	0
Melton Town	2021–22	UCL Premier Division North	7	0	1	0	—		0	0	8	0
Bedworth United	2021–22	NPL Division One Midlands	16	0	0	0	—		1	0	17	0
Belper Town	2021–22	NPL Division One Midlands	8	0	—		—		2 (Note: Appearances in Northern Premier League Division One Midlands play-offs)	0	10	0
Quorn	2022–23	UCL Premier Division North	3	1	2	0	—		1 (Note: Appearance(s) in FA Vase)	0	6	1
Melton Town	2022–23	UCL Premier Division North	21	3	0	0	—		1 (Note: Appearance(s) in United Counties League Cup)	0	22	3
Farsley Celtic	2022–23	National League North	7	0	—		—		—		7	0
Leicester St Andrews (loan)	2022–23	UCL Division One	4	0	0	0	—		0	0	4	0
Grantham Town	2023–24	NPL Division One East	7	2	2	0	—		2	0	11	2
Career total			189	7	12	0	1	0	13	0	215	7

== Honours ==
Barnet

- Conference Premier: 2014–15
