= Bira Dembélé =

French footballer (born 1988)

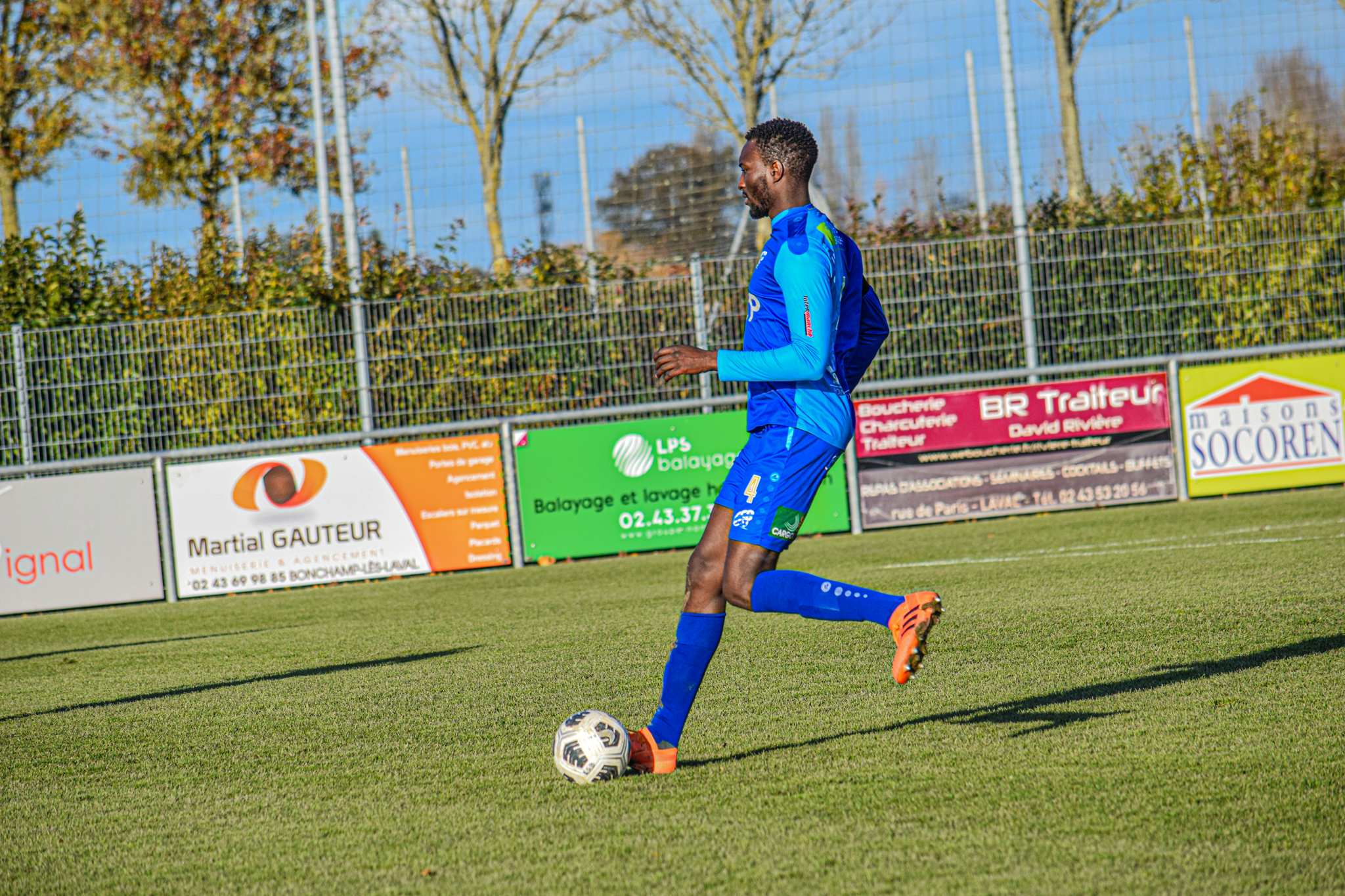

Personal information
- Full name: Bira Dembélé
- Date of birth: 22 March 1988 (age 38)
- Place of birth: Villepinte, Seine-Saint-Denis, France
- Height: 1.91 m (6 ft 3 in)
- Position: Defender

Youth career
- 1996–2000: Neuilly-sur-Marne
- 2000–2001: La Portugaise Porto
- 2001–2003: Villemomble Sports
- 2003–2004: UJA Alfortville
- 2004–2005: Neuilly-sur-Marne
- 2005–2008: Rennes

Senior career*
Years	Team	Apps	(Gls)
2008–2011	Rennes	9	(0)
2009–2010	→ Boulogne (loan)	22	(1)
2010–2011	→ Rennes II	20	(0)
2011–2014	Sedan	1	(0)
2012	→ Red Star (loan)	9	(0)
2012–2013	→ Sedan II	17	(2)
2014–2015	Stevenage	39	(3)
2015–2017	Barnet	49	(7)
2017–2021	Laval	58	(7)
2018–2021	→ Laval II	11	(1)

International career
2008	France U21	4	(0)
- * Club domestic league appearances and goals as of 19:49, 4 December 2020 (UTC)

Bira Dembélé (born 22 March 1988) is a French footballer.

== Club career ==
=== Stade Rennais ===
Born in Villepinte, Seine-Saint-Denis, France, Dembélé worked his way through the Stade Rennais youth system, having previously played for various youth teams. While progressing through the club's reserve, he paired with Prince Oniangué in central defense.

Following the injuries of the club's first team players, Dembélé was promoted to the club's first team. After appearing as an unused substitute on five occasions, Dembélé finally made his Stade Rennais debut, starting the whole game, in a 1–1 draw against Metz on 26 January 2008. After appearing in a handful of first team appearances, the club was convinced with his performance, leading Dembélé to signing a three-year professional contract. For the next two seasons, he went on to make thirteen appearances in all competitions.

In summer of 2009, Dembélé was loaned to Boulogne, recently promoted to Ligue 1, to gather some professional experience. He made his debut for the club on 16 August 2009, coming on as a late substitute, in a 2–1 win over Grenoble. He then scored his first professional goal on 4 October 2009, in a 3–2 loss against Lille. Since then, Dembélé became a first team regular at Boulogne throughout the 2009–10 season and making twenty-four appearances and scoring once.

Following the end of the 2009–10 season, Dembélé, however, was left on the sidelines by Frédéric Antonetti and played the whole 2010/2011 season with the Reserve. At the end of the season, he was released by the club.

=== Sedan ===
Following his release by Stade Rennais, Dembélé moved to Sedan in the summer of 2011. Dembélé was sent-off in the second-half of his league debut on 23 August 2011, in a 3–1 loss against Le Mans. However, Dembélé failed to make it to the first team. His time there included a brief loan to Red Star in January 2012. However, in April, Dembele loan spell was cut short because of injury.

For the next two seasons, Dembélé remained at the club until his release following the club's bankruptcy.

=== Stevenage ===
Dembélé joined League One side Stevenage on 22 February 2014 on a free transfer. Upon joining Stevenage, manager Graham Westley commented about Dembélé's talent, stating he "got a lot of quality; he's quick, very strong in the air and he can play the game."

Dembélé made his debut for the club three days later, on 25 February 2014, where he made his first start in a 1–0 win over Crewe Alexandra. After the match, Westley praised Dembele's debut, citing his pace and strong challenge. His next appearance against Crawley Town on 4 March 2014, where he played at the right-back and scored his first goal from then header. The result went on to be a 1–1 draw. Despite being sidelined with injuries, he went on to make thirteen appearances and scoring once. At the end of the 2013–14 season, Manager Westley revealed that Dembélé had signed a new contract with Stevenage.

In the 2014–15 season, Dembélé continued to remain in the left-back position since the start of the season but around at the same time, "seemed to struggle in the wide position." However, he struggled to regain his left-back position in the first team, due to Darius Charles being preferred and his own injury concerns. Despite this, he went on to score two more goals later in the season against Newport County and Tranmere Rovers. In his last appearance for Stevenage against Southend United in the play-offs, Dembélé was involved in a collision with Michael Timlin, leading him to miss out in the second-leg. At the end of the 2014–15 season, he was among twelve players to be released.

=== Barnet ===
In June 2015, Dembélé signed a two-year contract with League Two side, Barnet. Upon joining the club, he was given a number four shirt ahead of the 2015–16 season.

Dembélé made his Barnet debut in the opening game of the season, starting the whole match, in a 2–0 defeat against Leyton Orient. Since making his Barnet debut, he established himself in the Barnet first team. Dembélé then scored his first goal for the club, in a 2–1 loss against Wolverhampton Wanderers in the second round of the League Cup on 25 August 2015. Soon after, on 5 September 2015, in a 3–2 loss against Carlisle United. However, between late-September and November, he was plagued by injuries. After returning to the first team, he then scored twice on 19 December 2015, in a 4–2 win over Crawley Town. However, his return was short-lived when he suffered a knee injury and was sidelined for two months. It wasn't until on 9 April 2016 when he returned to the first team from injury, in a 3–0 win against Leyton Orient. In his first season at Barnet, Dembélé went on to make thirty appearances and scoring four times in all competitions.

In the 2016–17 season, Dembélé began playing in the central defense position at the start of the season until he suffered a bruised ribs that kept him out throughout August. After returning from injury, his return was short-lived when he was sent-off in the second half, in a 5–1 loss against Portsmouth on 24 September 2016. Dembélé then scored his first goal of the season on 8 October 2016, in a 3–2 loss against Doncaster Rovers. By the end of 2016, he scored three more goals later in the 2016–17 season against Plymouth Argyle, Newport County and Luton Town. Dembélé also captained Barnet for the first time, in a 2–1 loss against Peterborough United in the EFL Trophy. However, the 2016–17 season saw him being plagued with injuries. Dembélé was released at the end of the 2016–17 season. In all, he made 57 appearances for the Bees, scoring eight goals.

=== Laval ===
After leaving the club, Dembélé went on a trial at Scottish Premiership side Motherwell. After being featured in a friendly match, he, however, turned down a contract from the club. Instead, Dembélé joined Laval for the 2017–18 season, returning to France for the first time in four years.

== International career ==
In August 2008, he was called up France U21 and went on to play four times for the France U21 side.

== See also ==
- Sub-Saharan African community of Paris
