= Rossi Eames =

English football coach (born 1985)

Personal information
- Full name: Ross David Eames
- Date of birth: 27 January 1985 (age 41)
- Place of birth: Buckinghamshire, England

Senior career*
Years	Team	Apps	(Gls)
- Chesham United
- Amersham Town

Managerial career
- 2016–2017: Barnet (caretaker)
- 2017: Barnet
Gymnastics career
Discipline	Men's artistic gymnastics
- * Club domestic league appearances and goals

Ross David "Rossi" Eames (born 27 January 1985) is an English football coach and former player who has been the head coach of Barnet.

== Career ==
Eames began his sporting career as an artistic gymnast, winning medals at the British Championships before retiring from the sport aged 21.

He then played football for Chesham United (where he later managed the reserve team), and Amersham Town, and graduated from Leeds Metropolitan University in sports science, before joining Leeds United as an academy coach. Eames joined Barnet in 2009, and managed the under-16 and under-18 teams before being appointed as Development Team Coach in 2015, working with the club's under-21 players. Eames was appointed caretaker manager of the first team on 1 December 2016, alongside Henry Newman, following the departure of Martin Allen to Eastleigh. On 15 February 2017, Barnet appointed Kevin Nugent as the team's new first team manager and Rossi was appointed as Nugent's assistant manager. On 8 April, Rossi won the Lester Finch Award at the Barnet player of the year awards for his contribution to the football club.

On 15 April 2017, after the sacking of Kevin Nugent, Eames was once again placed in caretaker charge of Barnet.

Eames was then given the role of first team head coach on a permanent basis on 19 May 2017. Eames was replaced as first team head coach on 13 November 2017, by Mark McGhee with Eames taking a new role as head of player development. Eames resigned from the club in July 2018. He joined Chelsea as a scout in August 2018 before taking up a role in academy recruitment at Brighton & Hove Albion.

== Managerial statistics ==
As of 9 December 2017

Managerial record by team and tenure
Team	From	To	Record							
Team	From	To	G	W	D	L	GF	GA	GD	Win %
Barnet (interim)	1 December 2016	15 February 2017	12	5	2	5	13	15	−2	41.67
Barnet (caretaker)	15 April 2017	19 May 2017	4	2	0	2	6	7	−1	50.00
Barnet	19 May 2017	13 November 2017	22	4	6	12	26	34	−8	18.18
Total			38	11	8	19	45	56	−11	28.95
