= Sam Akinde =

English footballer

Personal information
- Date of birth: 14 April 1993 (age 33)
- Place of birth: Greenwich, England
- Position: Striker

Senior career*
Years	Team	Apps	(Gls)
2012–2013	Kettering Town	1	(0)
2013	Ebbsfleet United	0	(0)
2013–2014	Alfreton Town	3	(0)
2014	Dover Athletic	0	(0)
2014	Kingstonian	4	(2)
2014	Hereford United		
2015	Welling United	3	(0)
2015	Basingstoke Town	5	(0)
2015	St Albans City	2	(0)
2017	Barnet	1	(0)
2017	Hemel Hempstead Town	0	(0)
2018	Margate	1	(0)
2019–2020	Tonbridge Angels	0	(0)
2019–2020	→ Bedford Town (loan)	0	(0)
2020	Wingate & Finchley	0	(0)
- * Club domestic league appearances and goals as of 12:09, 25 January 2020 (UTC)

Samuel Akinde (born 14 April 1993) is an English semi-professional footballer who plays as a striker.

== Career ==
Akinde spent his early career in non-league football with Kettering Town, Ebbsfleet United, Alfreton Town, Dover Athletic, Kingstonian, Hereford United, Welling United, Basingstoke Town and St Albans City.

He signed for Alfreton in September 2013, and was released by the club in February 2014 after making five appearances. He moved to Dover Athletic in March 2014, then Kingstonian, making five appearances in April 2014. In October 2014 he was sent off for fighting while playing for Hereford.

He signed for Basingstoke Town in August 2015, and played for St Albans City between October and December 2015.

Akinde played several games on trial for Barnet's under-23 side throughout the 2016–17 season, and signed a one-year deal on 3 March 2017. He made his English Football League debut as a substitute against Wycombe Wanderers on 17 April 2017. Akinde was released by the Bees at the end of the 2016–17 season. He signed for Hemel Hempstead Town in October 2017. Akinde joined Margate in August 2018. In November 2019, Akinde joined Tonbridge Angels. The following month, he joined Bedford Town on dual registration. Akinde joined Wingate & Finchley in October 2020.

== Personal life ==
Akinde was born in England and is of Nigerian descent. His brother John is also a professional footballer.
