= John Akinde =

English footballer (born 1989)

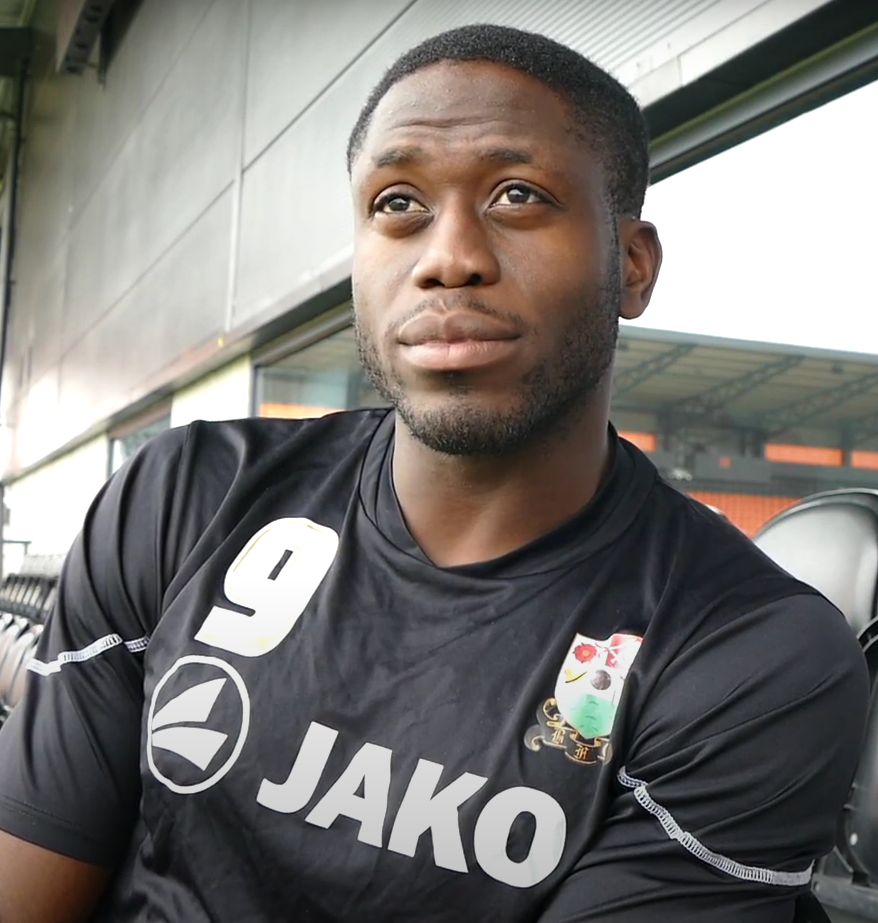
- Akinde in March 2017

Personal information
- Full name: Job Ayo Akinde
- Date of birth: 8 July 1989 (age 37)
- Place of birth: Camberwell, England
- Height: 6 ft 2 in (1.88 m)
- Position: Striker

Team information
- Current team: Folkestone Invicta

Youth career
- ?–2007: Gravesend & Northfleet

Senior career*
Years	Team	Apps	(Gls)
2007–2008	Ebbsfleet United	23	(8)
2007	→ Whitstable Town (loan)		
2007	→ Margate (loan)	7	(0)
2007	→ Whitstable Town (loan)	9	(7)
2008–2011	Bristol City	16	(1)
2009	→ Wycombe Wanderers (loan)	11	(7)
2009–2010	→ Wycombe Wanderers (loan)	6	(1)
2010	→ Brentford (loan)	2	(0)
2010–2011	→ Bristol Rovers (loan)	14	(0)
2011	→ Dagenham & Redbridge (loan)	9	(2)
2011–2013	Crawley Town	31	(1)
2012	→ Dagenham & Redbridge (loan)	5	(0)
2013	Portsmouth	11	(0)
2013–2014	Alfreton Town	43	(18)
2014–2018	Barnet	166	(87)
2018–2020	Lincoln City	68	(20)
2020–2022	Gillingham	71	(9)
2022–2024	Colchester United	79	(9)
2024–2026	Braintree Town	81	(15)
2026–	Folkestone Invicta	0	(0)
- * Club domestic league appearances and goals as of 30 May 2026 (UTC)

Job Ayo Akinde (born 8 July 1989), known as John Akinde, is an English professional footballer who plays for National League South club Folkestone Invicta.

He previously played for Barnet from 2014 to 2018 and for Lincoln City from 2018 to 2020. In the 2014–15 season, he led the Conference Premier league in scoring, helping Barnet win the league. In the 2018–19 season, he led Lincoln City in scoring, helping them win League Two.

== Career ==
Akinde's youth career started at Tottenham. Akinde played for Ebbsfleet United where he was a graduate of the club's academy under their previous name, Gravesend and Northfleet. In 28 league appearances for Gravesend/Ebbsfleet, Akinde scored 10 goals, he also won the FA Trophy with Ebbsfleet in the season before joining Bristol City, laying on the winning goal in the final at Wembley against Torquay United. He had a loan spell at Margate and two loan spells at Whitstable Town.

=== Bristol City ===
In 2008, Akinde was sold to Bristol City for £140,000 following the first ever transfer decided by a fans poll, in this case by the members of MyFootballClub.

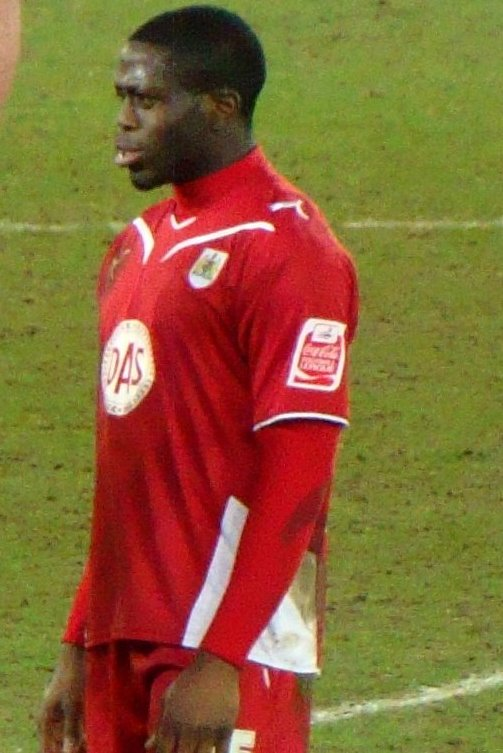
Akinde playing for Bristol City in January 2010

He scored on his debut for Bristol City in a 2–2 draw against Plymouth Argyle. Later in the season, Akinde signed for an initial month on loan to Wycombe Wanderers, on 11 March 2009. He also scored on his Wycombe debut, netting twice against Brentford in a 3–3 draw. Further goals against Barnet and Darlington led to the loan deal being extended until the end of the season.

On 13 November 2009, he returned to Wycombe Wanderers on a month's loan, this later being extended to two months, but he was recalled early by Bristol City on 7 January 2010. On 1 February 2010, Akinde joined Brentford on a month's loan, making two league appearances, one of which against former loan club Wycombe Wanderers.

He went out on loan for a fourth time in August 2010 when he joined Bristol Rovers in a deal scheduled to last until 5 January. In January 2011 Akinde joined Dagenham & Redbridge on loan until the end of the season.

=== Crawley Town ===
On 27 May 2011, newly promoted Crawley Town beat off higher league competition to sign Akinde for the 2011–12 season. He scored his first league goal for Crawley Town away to Shrewsbury Town at the New Meadow on 27 February 2012. On 17 March 2012, Akinde joined fellow League Two side Dagenham & Redbridge on loan for the remainder of the season, along with Charlie Wassmer. However, on 12 April 2012, Crawley recalled Akinde and fellow loanee Charlie Wassmer, to their push for promotion from League Two.

On 31 January 2013, Akinde was released by Crawley. On 8 February, he joined Portsmouth in a month-to-month contract. He made his debut a day later, against Bournemouth.

Akinde was released by Portsmouth at the end of the season, after failing to score in his 11 appearances for Pompey. He signed for Alfreton Town in August 2013 on a one-year contract. He made his debut against Kidderminster Harriers before scoring a hat-trick in his second game as Alfreton beat Salisbury City 3–2. He scored 18 goals in 42 league gamesthat season.

=== Barnet ===
Akinde joined Barnet on a two-year deal on 24 May 2014. In his first season for the club he scored 31 league goals making him the division's top goal scorer, as Barnet won the Conference Premier. In the 2015–16 season, Akinde scored 23 goals, helping the team to a 15th-placed finish and finishing as the 3rd top goal scorer in the League. At the end of the season, Akinde signed a three-year deal. On 22 April 2017, Akinde scored his 48th English Football League goal for the Bees to become their highest-ever League goalscorer, surpassing Sean Devine's record. He was transfer-listed by Barnet at the end of the 2017–18 season.

=== 2018–present ===
On 6 July 2018, Akinde signed a three-year deal with League Two club Lincoln City, and top scored for the Imps in the 2018–19 season as they won League Two.

On 24 January 2020 he joined League One side Gillingham for an undisclosed fee. He made his debut for the club the following day in a 2–2 away league draw against Rochdale, where he provided an assist for Gillingham's second goal. Akinde attracted interest in the January 2021 transfer window from Exeter City but nothing materialised and he remained at Gillingham.

On 27 January 2022, Akinde reached a mutual agreement with Gillingham to terminate his contract and signed a two-and-a-half-year contract with EFL League Two side Colchester United. He made his league debut for the Essex side two days later, appearing as a 66th-minute substitute in 1–1 home draw against Swindon Town and providing an assist for the 92nd-minute equaliser by teammate Emyr Huws.

On 8 May 2024, the club announced he would be released in the summer when his contract expired.

After being released by Colchester United, Akinde joined National League side Braintree Town.

In May 2026, Akinde joined newly promoted National League South club Folkestone Invicta.

== Personal life ==
Akinde was born in Camberwell, South London and is of Nigerian descent. Akinde's brother Sam (born 1993) has also played at Ebbsfleet, Alfreton and Barnet. The brothers have played together at the latter two clubs.

== Career statistics ==
As of end of 2023–24 season

Appearances and goals by club, season and competition
Club	Season	League			FA Cup		League Cup		Other		Total	
Club	Season	Division	Apps	Goals	Apps	Goals	Apps	Goals	Apps	Goals	Apps	Goals
Ebbsfleet United	2007–08	Conference Premier	18	6	0	0	—		4 (Note: Appearance(s) in FA Trophy)	0	22	6
Ebbsfleet United	2008–09	Conference Premier	5	2	0	0	—		0	0	5	2
Ebbsfleet United	Total		23	8	0	0	—		4	0	27	8
Margate (loan)	2007–08	Isthmian Premier	7	0	0	0	—		0	0	7	0
Whitstable Town (loan)	2007–08	Isthmian Division One South	9	7	0	0	—		0	0	9	7
Bristol City	2008–09	Championship	7	1	0	0	0	0	—		7	1
Bristol City	2009–10	Championship	7	0	2	0	2	0	—		11	0
Bristol City	2010–11	Championship	2	0	0	0	1	0	—		3	0
Bristol City	Total		16	1	2	0	3	0	—		21	1
Wycombe Wanderers (loan)	2008–09	League Two	11	7	0	0	0	0	0	0	11	7
Wycombe Wanderers (loan)	2009–10	League One	6	1	0	0	0	0	0	0	6	1
Wycombe Wanderers (loan)	Total		17	8	0	0	0	0	0	0	17	8
Brentford (loan)	2009–10	League One	2	0	0	0	0	0	0	0	2	0
Bristol Rovers (loan)	2010–11	League One	14	0	1	0	0	0	3 (Note: Appearance(s) in Football League Trophy)	0	18	0
Dagenham & Redbridge (loan)	2010–11	League One	9	2	0	0	0	0	0	0	9	2
Crawley Town	2011–12	League Two	25	1	2	0	1	0	1	0	29	1
Crawley Town	2012–13	League One	6	0	3	0	1	0	1	0	11	0
Crawley Town	Total		31	1	5	0	2	0	2	0	40	1
Dagenham & Redbridge (loan)	2011–12	League Two	5	0	0	0	0	0	0	0	5	0
Portsmouth	2012–13	League One	11	0	0	0	0	0	0	0	11	0
Alfreton Town	2013–14	Conference Premier	43	18	2	1	—		0	0	45	19
Barnet	2014–15	Conference Premier	45	31	3	2	—		1	0	49	33
Barnet	2015–16	League Two	43	23	2	0	2	1	1	0	48	24
Barnet	2016–17	League Two	46	26	0	0	1	0	1 (Note: Appearance(s) in EFL Trophy)	0	48	26
Barnet	2017–18	League Two	32	7	0	0	0	0	0	0	32	7
Barnet	Total		166	87	5	2	3	1	3	0	177	90
Lincoln City	2018–19	League Two	45	15	3	1	2	1	2	0	52	17
Lincoln City	2019–20	League One	23	5	1	0	2	0	3	3	29	8
Lincoln City	Total		68	20	4	1	4	1	5	3	81	25
Gillingham	2019–20	League One	9	1	0	0	0	0	0	0	9	1
Gillingham	2020–21	League One	44	7	2	0	2	0	3	0	51	7
Gillingham	2021–22	League One	18	1	2	0	0	0	1	0	21	1
Gillingham	Total		71	9	4	0	2	0	4	0	81	9
Colchester United	2021–22	League Two	15	2	0	0	0	0	0	0	15	2
Colchester United	2022–23	League Two	36	5	1	0	2	0	2	2	41	7
Colchester United	2023–24	League Two	28	2	0	0	1	1	1	0	30	3
Colchester United	Total		79	9	1	0	3	1	3	2	86	12
Career total			571	170	24	4	17	3	24	5	636	182

== Honours ==
Ebbsfleet United

- FA Trophy: 2007–08

Wycombe Wanderers

- Football League Two third-place promotion: 2008–09

Crawley Town

- Football League Two third-place promotion: 2011–12

Barnet

- Conference Premier: 2014–15

Lincoln City

- EFL League Two: 2018–19

Individual

- Conference Premier Player of the Month: December 2014
- Conference Premier Player of the Year: 2014–15
- Barnet Player of the Year: 2014–15, 2016–17
- Barnet Player's Player of the Year: 2014–15, 2016–17
- Non-League Footballer's Association Player of the Year: 2014–15
- Conference Premier Team of the Year: 2014–15
- PFA Team of the Year: 2018–19 League Two
