= Robert Rice (footballer) =

English footballer

Personal information
- Full name: Robert Anthony Rice
- Date of birth: 23 February 1989 (age 37)
- Place of birth: Hendon, England
- Height: 5 ft 8 in (1.73 m)
- Position: Right back

Team information
- Current team: Basingstoke Town

Youth career
- 2005–2006: Fulham
- 2006–2007: Wycombe Wanderers

Senior career*
Years	Team	Apps	(Gls)
2007–2009	Wycombe Wanderers	2	(0)
2009–	Basingstoke Town	120	(6)
- * Club domestic league appearances and goals as of 00:00, 26 Dec 2012 (UTC)

Robert Anthony Rice (born 23 February 1989) is an English footballer who plays as a rig back for Basingstoke Town.

Rice joined Wycombe Wanderers as a trainee after being released by Fulham. He made his first appearance for Wycombe in a 1–0 defeat to Notts County at the end of the 2007–08 season before being released on 6 May 2009. He joined Basingstoke Town on 19 June on a one-year contract. He is now Basingstoke Town's a first choice right defender.
