= 2004–05 Milton Keynes Dons F.C. season =

Milton Keynes Dons
2004–05 season
- Chairman: Pete Winkelman
- Manager: Danny Wilson (from 7 December 2004); Jimmy Gilligan (caretaker, 8 November 2004 to 7 December 2004); Stuart Murdoch (until 8 November 2004)
- Stadium: National Hockey Stadium
- League One: 20th
- FA Cup: Third round (eliminated by Peterborough United)
- League Cup: Second round (eliminated by Cardiff City)
- League Trophy: Second round (eliminated by Bristol City)
- Top goalscorer: League: Izale McLeod (16); All: Izale McLeod (18)
- Highest home attendance: 7,620 (vs Luton Town); 20 November 2004, League One
- Lowest home attendance: 2,065 (vs Lancaster City); 13 November 2004, FA Cup R1
- Average home league attendance: 4,896
- Biggest win: 4–1 (vs Bradford City); 8 February 2005, League One
- Biggest defeat: 5–0 (vs Hartlepool United); 3 January 2005, League One
Home colours	Away colours	Third colours

The 2004–05 season was Milton Keynes Dons' inaugural season as a new club following the team's change of name from Wimbledon FC on 21 June 2004. This change of name followed the controversial relocation of Wimbledon FC during the previous 2003–04 season.

Following Wimbledon FC's relegation from the 2003–04 Football League First Division, Milton Keynes Dons played their first season in the newly re-branded Football League One (formerly known as the Second Division).

As well as competing in League One, the club also participated in the FA Cup, League Cup and League Trophy.

The season covers the period from 1 July 2004 to 30 June 2005.

== Competitions ==
=== League One ===
==== League table ====
Pos	Team	Pld	W	D	L	GF	GA	GD	Pts	Promotion or relegation
18	Port Vale	46	17	5	24	49	59	−10	56	
19	Oldham Athletic	46	14	10	22	60	73	−13	52	
20	Milton Keynes Dons	46	12	15	19	54	68	−14	51	
21	Torquay United (R)	46	12	15	19	55	79	−24	51	Relegation to Football League Two
22	Wrexham (R)	46	13	14	19	62	80	−18	43 (Note: Wrexham deducted 10 points for entering administration.)	Relegation to Football League Two

Updated to match(es) played on May 2005. Source: Soccerbase
Rules for classification: 1) points; 2) goal difference; 3) number of goals scored.
(R) Relegated

==== Results summary ====
Overall								Home						Away					
Pld	W	D	L	GF	GA	GD	Pts	W	D	L	GF	GA	GD	W	D	L	GF	GA	GD
46	12	15	19	54	68	−14	51	8	10	5	33	27	+6	4	5	14	21	41	−20

Last updated: 7 May 2005.
Source: Sky Sports

==== Matches ====
Win Draw Loss Postponed

7 August 2004 1	Milton Keynes Dons	1–1	Barnsley	Milton Keynes
15:00 BST	McLeod 76', (yellow card) 86'	Report	Reid 22'	Stadium: National Hockey Stadium; Attendance: 4,720; Referee: Keith Hill

10 August 2004 2	Port Vale	3–2	Milton Keynes Dons	Stoke-on-trent
19:45 BST	Brooker 43'; Armstrong 46', 64', (yellow card) 81'	Report	Harding 19', 75'; Kamara (yellow card) 42'; Hervé (yellow card) 45'	Stadium: Vale Park; Attendance: 4,602; Referee: Mick Fletcher

15 August 2004 3	Swindon Town	2–1	Milton Keynes Dons	Swindon
19:45 BST	Robinson (yellow card) 6'; Parkin 23'; Howard 63'	Report	Small (yellow card) 16'; Smart 42'	Stadium: County Ground; Attendance: 5,060; Referee: Trevor Parkes

21 August 2004 4	Milton Keynes Dons	1–3	Bournemouth	Milton Keynes
15:00 BST	Smart 49' (pen.)	Report	Hayter 21', 76'; Browning (yellow card) 73'; Fletcher 90'	Stadium: National Hockey Stadium; Attendance: 3,230; Referee: Brian Curson

28 August 2004 5	Oldham Athletic	3–0	Milton Keynes Dons	Oldham
15:00 BST	Johnson 39'; Killen 43'; Arber 61'; Boshell (yellow card) 86'	Report	Chorley (yellow card) 76'	Stadium: Boundary Park; Attendance: 5,066; Referee: Trevor Kettle

30 August 2004 6	Milton Keynes Dons	1–0	Torquay United	Milton Keynes
19:45 BST	Puncheon 45'; Kamara (yellow card) 83'	Report	Meirelles (yellow card) 79'	Stadium: National Hockey Stadium; Attendance: 5,066; Referee: Kevin Wright

4 September 2004 7	Chesterfield	2–2	Milton Keynes Dons	Chesterfield
15:00 BST	Blatherwick (yellow card) 4'; N'Toya-Zoa 31'; Downes 48'; Nicholson (yellow card) 66'	Report	Edds (yellow card) 38'; Chorley (yellow card) 45'; McLeod 64', (yellow card) 90'; Small 88'	Stadium: Recreation Ground; Attendance: 4,537; Referee: Lee Cable

11 September 2004 8	Milton Keynes Dons	0–1	Doncaster Rovers	Milton Keynes
15:00 BST	Lewington (yellow card) 68'; McLeod (yellow card) 87'	Report	Fortune-West (yellow card) 49'; Albrighton (yellow card) 59', (goal) 66'; Fenton (yellow card) 89'	Stadium: National Hockey Stadium; Attendance: 4,334; Referee: Iain Williamson

18 September 2004 9	Colchester United	0–1	Milton Keynes Dons	Colchester
15:00 BST	Fagan (yellow card) 86'	Report	Lewington (yellow card) 75'; McLeod 45'; Hervé (yellow card) 86'	Stadium: Layer Road; Attendance: 3,460; Referee: Eddie Evans

25 September 2004 10	Milton Keynes Dons	4–2	Hartlepool United	Milton Keynes
15:00 BST	McLeod 31', 57', (red card) 74'; Chorley (yellow card) 44'; Small 46'; Smith 50' (pen.); Williams (yellow card) 70'	Report	Boyd 20', 87'; Pouton (yellow card) 57'; Sweeney (red card) 75'; Porter (yellow card) 90'	Stadium: National Hockey Stadium; Attendance: 3,685; Referee: Joe Ross

2 October 2004 11	Sheffield Wednesday	1–1	Milton Keynes Dons	Sheffield
15:00 BST	Aljofree (yellow card) 40'; McGovern 65'; McMahon (yellow card) 84'	Report	McLeod (yellow card) 84', (goal) 89'	Stadium: Hillsborough; Attendance: 20,245; Referee: Steve Tomlin

8 October 2004 12	Milton Keynes Dons	1–2	Bradford City	Milton Keynes
19:45 BST	Ntimban-Zeh (yellow card) 45'; McLeod 20'	Report	Schumacher (yellow card) 31'; Windass (yellow card) 45'; Kearney (yellow card) 48', (goal) 55'; Jacobs (yellow card) 50'; Adebola 90'	Stadium: National Hockey Stadium; Attendance: 4,532; Referee: Andy Hall

16 October 2004 13	Milton Keynes Dons	0–0	Brentford	Milton Keynes
15:00 BST	Tapp (yellow card) 53'; Edds (yellow card) 82'	Report	Hargreaves (yellow card) 22'; Myers (red card) 34'; Turner (yellow card) 39'	Stadium: National Hockey Stadium; Attendance: 5,924; Referee: Paul Danson

20 October 2004 14	Hull City	3–2	Milton Keynes Dons	Hull
19:45 BST	Green 1', 90'; Keane 88'	Report	McLeod 33'; Chorley 76'; Lewington (yellow card) 90'	Stadium: KC Stadium; Attendance: 14,317; Referee: Grant Hegley

23 October 2004 15	Huddersfield Town	3–1	Milton Keynes Dons	Huddersfield
15:00 BST	Mendes 44'; Abbott 33', 45' (pen.)	Report	Chorley 86' (pen.); McLeod (yellow card) 87'	Stadium: Galpharm Stadium; Attendance: 10,709; Referee: Clive Oliver

30 October 2004 16	Milton Keynes Dons	1–1	Walsall	Milton Keynes
15:00 BST	Kamara 36'; Lewington (yellow card) 64'	Report	Wrack 13'; Aranalde (yellow card) 58'; Emblen (yellow card) 85'	Stadium: National Hockey Stadium; Attendance: 4,247; Referee: Fred Graham

6 November 2004 17	Bristol City	4–1	Milton Keynes Dons	Bristol
15:00 GMT	Lita 4', 25'; Brooker 29'; Wilkshire 63'; Coles (yellow card) 84'	Report	Small (yellow card) 31', (goal) 52'; McLeod (yellow card) 55'	Stadium: Ashton Gate; Attendance: 10,717; Referee: Kevin Friend

20 November 2004 18	Milton Keynes Dons	1–4	Luton Town	Milton Keynes
15:00 GMT	Small 45'; Smart (yellow card) 58'; Puncheon (yellow card) 75'	Report	Vine 8'; Nichols (yellow card) 16'; Howard 45', 66', 83'	Stadium: National Hockey Stadium; Attendance: 7,620; Referee: Graham Salisbury

27 November 2004 19	Tranmere Rovers	2–0	Milton Keynes Dons	Tranmere
15:00 GMT	Jackson (yellow card) 45'; Hall 53'; Whitmore 84'; Brown (yellow card) 90'	Report	Chorley (yellow card) 43'	Stadium: Prenton Park; Attendance: 8,402; Referee: Kevin Woolmer

7 December 2004 20	Milton Keynes Dons	1–1	Peterborough United	Milton Keynes
19:45 GMT	Small 53'; Hervé (yellow card) 90'	Report	Constantine 26'	Stadium: National Hockey Stadium; Attendance: 3,913; Referee: Mick Fletcher

11 December 2004 21	Milton Keynes Dons	3–0	Wrexham	Milton Keynes
15:00 GMT	Rizzo (yellow card) 7'; McLeod (yellow card) 27'; Small 50', 84'	Report	Lawrence (yellow card) 29'	Stadium: National Hockey Stadium; Attendance: 3,601; Referee: P Melin

18 December 2004 22	Stockport County	3–1	Milton Keynes Dons	Stockport
15:00 GMT	Daly 2', 41'; Robertson (yellow card) 39'; Williams 87'	Report	Tapp 77'; Chorley (yellow card) 81'; Mitchell (yellow card) 89'; Smart (yellow card) 89'	Stadium: Edgeley Park; Attendance: 3,902; Referee: Andy Penn

26 December 2004 23	Doncaster Rovers	3–0	Milton Keynes Dons	Doncaster
15:00 GMT	Edds 8' (o.g.); Johnson 60', 62'; Doolan (yellow card) 63'; Albrighton (yellow card) 71'; Ryan (yellow card) 83'	Report	Chorley (yellow card) 23'; Mitchell (yellow card) 50'	Stadium: Belle Vue; Attendance: 6,153; Referee: Nigel Miller

28 December 2004 24	Milton Keynes Dons	3–1	Blackpool	Milton Keynes
15:00 GMT	McLeod 40'; Edds (yellow card) 54'; Palmer 73'; Smart 82'		McGregor (yellow card) 23'; Taylor (yellow card) 43', (goal) 81' (pen.); Murphy (yellow card) 59'; Evans (yellow card) 71'	Stadium: National Hockey Stadium; Attendance: 4,943

1 January 2005 25	Milton Keynes Dons	1–1	Chesterfield	Milton Keynes
15:00 GMT	Smart 5' (pen.), (yellow card) 55'; Mitchell (yellow card) 54'	Report	Nicholson (yellow card) 65'; Evatt 84'	Stadium: National Hockey Stadium; Attendance: 4,214; Referee: Paul Armstrong

3 January 2005 26	Hartlepool United	5–0	Milton Keynes Dons	Hartlepool
15:00 GMT	Sweeney 21'; Nelson (yellow card) 36'; Boyd 49', 57'; Porter 80' (pen.); Appleby 90'	Report		Stadium: Victoria Park; Attendance: 5,060; Referee: Colin Webster

15 January 2005 27	Milton Keynes Dons	2–0	Colchester United	Milton Keynes
15:00 GMT	Harding 2'; Small 18'	Report	Chilvers (yellow card) 89'	Stadium: National Hockey Stadium; Attendance: 3,883; Referee: Russell Booth

22 January 2005 28	Blackpool	1–0	Milton Keynes Dons	Blackpool
15:00 GMT	Edwards 8'; Richardson (yellow card) 45'; Edwards (yellow card) 59'; Coid (yellow card) 88'; Parker (yellow card) 90'	Report	Rizzo (yellow card) 27'; Lewington (yellow card) 87'	Stadium: Bloomfield Road; Attendance: 5,798; Referee: E Evans

29 January 2005 29	Milton Keynes Dons	2–2	Sheffield Wednesday	Milton Keynes
15:00 GMT	Platt 58'; Small (yellow card) 71'; McLeod 85'	Report	Quinn 11'; O'Brien (yellow card) 54'; Chorley 62' (o.g.)	Stadium: National Hockey Stadium; Attendance: 7,325; Referee: Tony Bates

5 February 2005 30	Brentford	1–0	Milton Keynes Dons	Brentford
15:00 GMT	Hunt 78' (pen.)	Report	Harding (yellow card) 43'; Smith (yellow card) 54'; Pensée (yellow card) 77'; Platt (yellow card) 87'; Chorley (yellow card) 90'	Stadium: Griffin Park; Attendance: 5,077; Referee: Steve Tanner

8 February 2005 31	Bradford City	1–4	Milton Keynes Dons	Bradford
19:45 GMT	Windass 50'; Wetherall (yellow card) 61'	Report	Small 32'; McLeod 44', 57'; Harding 55'	Stadium: Valley Parade; Attendance: 6,409; Referee: Scott Mathieson

12 February 2005 32	Milton Keynes Dons	2–1	Huddersfield Town	Milton Keynes
15:00 GMT	McLeod 33'; Mitchell (yellow card) 65'; Platt 90'	Report	Booth 30'	Stadium: National Hockey Stadium; Attendance: 4,793; Referee: Brian Curson

19 February 2005 33	Walsall	0–0	Milton Keynes Dons	Walsall
15:00 GMT	Aranalde (yellow card) 60'	Report	Oyedele (yellow card) 70'	Stadium: Bescot Stadium; Attendance: 5,888; Referee: Lee Probert

22 February 2005 34	Milton Keynes Dons	1–1	Hull City	Milton Keynes
19:45 GMT	Lewington 50'	Report	Facey 86'	Stadium: National Hockey Stadium; Attendance: 4,407; Referee: Mike Russell

26 February 2005 35	Wrexham	1–1	Milton Keynes Dons	Wrexham
15:00 GMT	Morgan (yellow card) 87'	Report	Lewington (yellow card) 81'; Harding (yellow card) 84'	Stadium: Racecourse Ground; Attendance: 3,406; Referee: P Prosser

5 March 2005 36	Milton Keynes Dons	2–1	Stockport County	Milton Keynes
15:00 GMT	Lewington 34', (yellow card) 40'; Edds 59'; McLeod (yellow card) 85'; Puncheon (yellow card) 90'	Report	Hardiker (red card) 80'; Briggs 74'; Goodwin (yellow card) 90'	Stadium: National Hockey Stadium; Attendance: 4,146; Referee: M Messias

12 March 2005 37	Milton Keynes Dons	1–1	Port Vale	Milton Keynes
15:00 GMT	Lewington (yellow card) 61'; Chorley (yellow card) 64'; Platt 72'	Report	Sonner (yellow card) 50'; Matthews (yellow card) 62', (goal) 69'; Walsh (yellow card) 84'	Stadium: National Hockey Stadium; Attendance: 4,676; Referee: Keith Stroud

19 March 2005 38	Barnsley	1–1	Milton Keynes Dons	Barnsley
15:00 GMT	Williams (yellow card) 28'; Nardiello 45'	Report	Edds (yellow card) 31'; Pensée 55'	Stadium: Oakwell; Attendance: 8,111; Referee: T Leake

25 March 2005 39	Milton Keynes Dons	1–1	Swindon Town	Milton Keynes
15:00 GMT	Small 14', (yellow card) 57'; McLeod (yellow card) 50'	Report	O'Hanlon (yellow card) 24'; Smith 43', (yellow card) 62'	Stadium: National Hockey Stadium; Attendance: 7,019; Referee: Paul Taylor

28 March 2005 40	Bournemouth	0–1	Milton Keynes Dons	Bournemouth
15:00 GMT	Green (yellow card) 36'; Browning (yellow card) 90'	Report	McLeod (yellow card) 38'; Edds 73'	Stadium: Dean Court; Attendance: 7,064; Referee: A Hall

2 April 2005 41	Milton Keynes Dons	1–1	Oldham Athletic	Milton Keynes
15:00 GMT	Edds 84'; Rizzo (yellow card) 89'	Report	Stam (yellow card) 26'; Hughes (yellow card) 36'	Stadium: National Hockey Stadium; Attendance: 5,426; Referee: A Woolmer

9 April 2005 42	Torquay United	1–0	Milton Keynes Dons	Torquay
15:00 GMT	Woods (yellow card) 46'; Brown (yellow card) 53'; Russell (yellow card) 54'; Abbey 82'	Report	McClenahan (yellow card) 56'; McLeod (yellow card) 77'	Stadium: Plainmoor; Attendance: 3,509; Referee: S Tanner

16 April 2005 43	Luton Town	1–0	Milton Keynes Dons	Luton
15:00 GMT	Holmes (yellow card) 11'; Chorley 31' (o.g.)	Report	McClenahan (yellow card) 20'; Lewington (yellow card) 64'; Chorley (yellow card) 81'	Stadium: Kenilworth Road; Attendance: 9,000; Referee: J Singh

23 April 2005 44	Milton Keynes Dons	1–2	Bristol City	Milton Keynes
15:00 GMT	McLeod 8'; McClenahan (yellow card) 23'	Report	Fortune (yellow card) 6'; Murray (yellow card) 36'; Lita 45', 70'	Stadium: National Hockey Stadium; Attendance: 5,656; Referee: Darren Drysdale

30 April 2005 45	Peterborough United	0–3	Milton Keynes Dons	Peterborough
15:00 GMT	Woodhouse (yellow card) 30'; Kanu (yellow card) 85'	Report	Rizzo 9'; Chorley (yellow card) 64'; McLeod 22', 85', (yellow card) 84'	Stadium: London Road Stadium; Attendance: 3,742; Referee: Grant Hegley

7 May 2005 46	Milton Keynes Dons	2–1	Tranmere Rovers	Milton Keynes
15:00 GMT	Edds 6', 84'; Smith (yellow card) 45'	Report	Jackson (yellow card) 45'; Beresford 65'; Dagnall (yellow card) 87'	Stadium: National Hockey Stadium; Attendance: 7,359; Referee: P Taylor

=== FA Cup ===
Win Draw Loss

13 November 2004 First round	Milton Keynes Dons	1–0	Lancaster City	Milton Keynes
15:00 GMT	Small 48'	Report		Stadium: National Hockey Stadium; Attendance: 2,065; Referee: Trevor Kettle

3 December 2004 Second round	Cambridge City	0–1	Milton Keynes Dons	Cambridge
19:55 GMT		Report	Smart 5'	Stadium: Milton Road; Attendance: 2,000

8 January 2005 Third round	Milton Keynes Dons	0–2	Peterborough United	Milton Keynes
15:00 GMT	McLeod (yellow card) 69'; Chorley (yellow card) 87'	Report	Logan 45'; Arber 57'	Stadium: National Hockey Stadium; Attendance: 4,407; Referee: Phil Crossley

=== League Cup ===
Win Draw Loss

24 August 2004 First round	Peterborough United	0–3	Milton Keynes Dons	Peterborough
19:45 BST	Rea (yellow card) 73'	Report	McLeod (yellow card) 42', (goal) 63'; Small (yellow card) 45'; Smart 80'; Kamara 90'	Stadium: London Road Stadium; Attendance: 2,886; Referee: Kevin Friend

21 September 2004 Second round	Milton Keynes Dons	1–4	Cardiff City	Milton Keynes
19:45 BST	Chorley (yellow card) 51'; Ntimban-Zeh (red card) 59'; McLeod 85'	Report	Thorne 14', 21'; Bullock 19', (yellow card) 68'; Vidmar (yellow card) 65'; Anthony 72'	Stadium: National Hockey Stadium; Attendance: 2,266; Referee: Michael Jones

=== League Trophy ===
Win Draw Loss

28 September 2004 First round	Brentford	0–3	Milton Keynes Dons	Brentford
19:45 BST	Myers (yellow card) 56'	Report	Pacquette 7'; Lewington 22'; Small 27'	Stadium: Griffin Park; Attendance: 1,679; Referee: Gary Lewis

2 November 2004 Second round	Bristol City	2–1	Milton Keynes Dons	Bristol
19:45 BST	Hill (yellow card) 11'; Lita 45', 52'	Report	Pacquette (yellow card) 11'; Chorley (yellow card) 34'; Johnson (yellow card) 57'; Makofo 67'; McKoy (yellow card) 88'	Stadium: Ashton Gate; Attendance: 3,367; Referee: Joe Ross

== Squad ==
As of 1 May 2018
Note: Players' ages as of the opening match of the 2004–05 season.

#	Name	Nationality	Position	Date of birth (age)	Signed from	Signed in	Transfer fee
Goalkeepers
1	Scott Bevan	(England)	GK	19 September 1979 (aged 24)	(England) Southampton	2004	Free
12	David Martin	(England)	GK	22 January 1986 (aged 18)	(England) Wimbledon	2004	Free
25	Matt Baker	(England)	GK	18 December 1979 (aged 24)	(Wales) Wrexham	2004	Free
30	Paul Heald	(England)	GK	20 September 1968 (aged 35)	(England) Wimbledon	2004	Free
Defenders
2	Harry Ntimban-Zeh	(France)	CB	26 September 1973 (aged 30)	(England) Wimbledon	2004	Free
3	Dean Lewington	(England)	LB / CB	18 May 1984 (aged 20)	(England) Wimbledon	2004	Free
5	Ben Chorley (C)	(England)	CB	30 September 1982 (aged 21)	(England) Wimbledon	2004	Free
14	Shola Oyedele	(Nigeria)	RB	14 September 1984 (aged 19)	(England) Wimbledon	2004	Free
18	Steve Palmer	(England)	CB	31 March 1968 (aged 36)	(England) Queens Park Rangers	2004	Free
19	Nathan Koo-Boothe	(Jamaica)	CB	18 July 1985 (aged 19)	(England) Watford	2004	Free
20	Leon Crooks	(England)	RB	21 November 1985 (aged 18)	(England) Wimbledon	2004	Free
26	Trent McClenahan	(Australia)	CB / DM	4 February 1985 (aged 19)	(England) West Ham United	2005	Loan
31	Michel Pensée	(Cameroon)	CB	16 June 1973 (aged 31)	Free agent	2005	Free
Midfielders
6	Ben Harding	(England)	CM	6 September 1984 (aged 19)	(England) Wimbledon	2004	Free
7	Malvin Kamara	(Sierra Leone)	LM / LB	17 November 1983 (aged 20)	(England) Wimbledon	2004	Free
8	Wade Small	(England)	LW / AM / ST	23 February 1984 (aged 20)	(England) Wimbledon	2004	Free
10	Gary Smith	(England)	AM	30 January 1984 (aged 20)	(England) Middlesbrough	2004	Free
11	Alex Tapp	(England)	AM	7 June 1982 (aged 22)	(England) Wimbledon	2004	Free
13	Gareth Edds	(Australia)	CM / RB	3 February 1981 (aged 23)	(England) Bradford City	2004	Free
15	Laurent Hervé	(France)	DM	19 June 1976 (aged 28)	(France) AS Beauvais	2004	Free
16	Jamie Mackie	(Scotland)	LW / AM / ST	22 September 1985 (aged 18)	(England) Wimbledon	2004	Free
17	Jason Puncheon	(England)	RW / AM	26 June 1986 (aged 18)	(England) Wimbledon	2004	Free
28	Nick McKoy	(England)	AM	3 September 1986 (aged 17)	(England) Wimbledon	2004	Free
Forwards
9	Allan Smart	(Scotland)	ST	8 July 1974 (aged 30)	(England) Crewe Alexandra	2004	Free
21	Julien Hornuss	(France)	ST ]	12 June 1986 (aged 18)	(France) AJ Auxerre	2004	Free
22	Nick Rizzo	(Australia)	LW / ST	9 June 1979 (aged 25)	(Italy) AC Prato	2004	Free
23	Izale McLeod	(England)	ST	15 October 1984 (aged 19)	(England) Derby County	2004	Undisclosed
24	Craig Westcarr	(England)	ST	29 January 1985 (aged 19)	(England) Nottingham Forest	2005	Free
27	Clive Platt	(England)	ST	27 October 1977 (aged 26)	(England) Peterborough United	2004	Undisclosed
29	Serge Makofo	(Democratic Republic of the Congo)	ST	3 September 1986 (aged 17)	(England) Wimbledon	2004	Free
Out on loan
5	Mark Williams	(Northern Ireland)	CB	28 September 1970 (aged 33)	(England) Wimbledon	2004	Free
Left club during season
22	Richard Pacquette	(Dominica)	ST	28 January 1983 (aged 21)	(England) Queens Park Rangers	2004	Free
22	Paul Rachubka	(England)	GK	21 May 1981 (aged 23)	(England) Charlton Athletic	2004	Loan
24	Richard Johnson	(Australia)	CM	27 April 1974 (aged 30)	(England) Queens Park Rangers	2005	Loan
24	Paul Mitchell	(England)	CM / CB	26 August 1981 (aged 22)	(England) Wigan Athletic	2004	Loan
26	Anthony Danze	(Australia)	AM / CM	15 March 1984 (aged 20)	(England) Crystal Palace	2004	Loan

== Squad statistics ==
=== Top scorers ===
As of 12 March 2017

Place	Position	Nation	Number	Name	League	FA Cup	League Cup	FL Trophy	Total
1	FW	(England)	23	Izale McLeod	16	0	1	0	17
2	FW	(England)	8	Wade Small	10	1	0	0	11
3	FW	(Scotland)	9	Allan Smart	4	1	1	0	6
4	MF	(Australia)	13	Gareth Edds	5	0	0	0	5
5	MF	(England)	6	Ben Harding	4	0	0	0	4
6	FW	(England)	27	Clive Platt	3	0	0	0	3
6	DF	(England)	3	Dean Lewington	2	0	0	1	3
7	DF	(England)	4	Ben Chorley	2	0	0	0	2
7	FW	(Australia)	22	Nick Rizzo	2	0	0	0	2
7	MF	(Sierra Leone)	7	Malvin Kamara	1	0	1	0	2
8	DF	(England)	18	Steve Palmer	1	0	0	0	1
8	DF	(Cameroon)	31	Michel Pensée	1	0	0	0	1
8	MF	(England)	17	Jason Puncheon	1	0	0	0	1
8	MF	(England)	10	Gary Smith	1	0	0	0	1
8	MF	(England)	11	Alex Tapp	1	0	0	0	1
8	FW	(Democratic Republic of the Congo)	29	Serge Makofo	0	0	0	1	1
8	FW	(Dominica)	22	Richard Pacquette	0	0	0	1	1
Total					54	2	4	4	64

=== Disciplinary record ===
As of 18 January 2017

Number	Nation	Position	Name	League One		FA Cup		League Cup		League Trophy		Total	
Number	Nation	Position	Name	Booked	Sent off (straight red)	Booked	Sent off (straight red)	Booked	Sent off (straight red)	Booked	Sent off (straight red)	Booked	Sent off (straight red)
23	(England)	FW	Izale McLeod	13	1	1	0	1	0	0	0	15	1
4	(England)	DF	Ben Chorley	10	0	1	0	1	0	1	0	13	0
3	(England)	DF	Dean Lewington	9	0	0	0	0	0	0	0	9	0
8	(England)	MF	Wade Small	5	0	0	0	1	0	0	0	6	0
13	(Australia)	MF	Gareth Edds	4	0	0	0	0	0	0	0	4	0
24	(England)	DF	Paul Mitchell	4	0	0	0	0	0	0	0	4	0
15	(France)	MF	Laurent Hervé	3	0	0	0	0	0	0	0	3	0
26	(Australia)	DF	Trent McClenahan	3	0	0	0	0	0	0	0	3	0
6	(England)	MF	Ben Harding	2	0	0	0	0	0	0	0	2	0
7	(Sierra Leone)	MF	Malvin Kamara	2	0	0	0	0	0	0	0	2	0
17	(England)	MF	Jason Puncheon	2	0	0	0	0	0	0	0	2	0
22	(Australia)	FW	Nick Rizzo	2	0	0	0	0	0	0	0	2	0
9	(Scotland)	FW	Allan Smart	2	0	0	0	0	0	0	0	2	0
10	(England)	MF	Gary Smith	2	0	0	0	0	0	0	0	2	0
2	(France)	DF	Harry Ntimban-Zeh	0	0	0	0	0	1	0	0	0	1
14	(Nigeria)	DF	Shola Oyedele	1	0	0	0	0	0	0	0	1	0
27	(England)	FW	Clive Platt	1	0	0	0	0	0	0	0	1	0
11	(England)	MF	Alex Tapp	1	0	0	0	0	0	0	0	1	0
5	(Northern Ireland)	DF	Mark Williams	1	0	0	0	0	0	0	0	1	0
24	(Australia)	MF	Richard Johnson	0	0	0	0	0	0	1	0	1	0
28	(England)	MF	Nick McKoy	0	0	0	0	0	0	1	0	1	0
22	(Dominica)	FW	Richard Pacquette	0	0	0	0	0	0	1	0	1	0
Totals				67	1	2	0	3	1	4	0	76	2

=== Clean sheets ===
As of 20 June 2017

Rank	No.	Pos	Nat	Name	League One	FA Cup	League Cup	League Trophy	Total
1	12	GK	(England)	David Martin	3	2	1	1	7
2	25	GK	(England)	Matt Baker	4	0	0	0	4
3	1	GK	(England)	Scott Bevan	2	0	0	0	2
4	22	GK	(England)	Paul Rachubka	0	0	0	0	0
Totals					9	2	1	1	13

== Transfers ==
=== Transfers in ===
Date	Position	Nationality	Name	From	Fee	Ref.
1 July 2004	CM	(France)	Laurent Hervé	(France) AS Beauvais	Free transfer	
1 July 2004	CM	(Australia)	Gareth Edds	(England) Bradford City	Free transfer	
7 July 2004	CB	(England)	Steve Palmer	(England) Queens Park Rangers	Free transfer	
13 July 2004	ST	(Scotland)	Allan Smart	(England) Crewe Alexandra	Free transfer	
31 July 2004	ST	(England)	Izale McLeod	(England) Derby County	Undisclosed	
24 September 2004	ST	(Dominica)	Richard Pacquette	Free agent	Free transfer	
19 November 2004	LW	(Australia)	Nick Rizzo	(Italy) AC Prato	Free transfer	
17 December 2004	GK	(England)	Matt Baker	(Wales) Wrexham	Free transfer	
1 January 2005	CB	(Cameroon)	Michel Pensée	Free agent	Free transfer	
12 January 2005	ST	(England)	Clive Platt	(England) Peterborough United	Undisclosed	

=== Transfers out ===
Date	Position	Nationality	Name	To	Fee	Ref.
3 August 2004	GK	(Wales)	Lee Worgan	(England) Rushden & Diamonds	Free transfer	
1 November 2004	ST	(Dominica)	Richard Pacquette	(England) Brentford (Note: Following Pacquette's release on 1 November 2004, he signed for Brentford on 26 November 2004.)	Released	
12 May 2005	RW	(Scotland)	Jamie Mackie	(England) Exeter City (Note: Following Mackie's release on 12 May 2005, he later signed for Exeter City.)	Released	
12 May 2005	ST	(Scotland)	Allan Smart	(England) Bury (Note: Following Allan's release on 12 May 2005, he later signed for Bury.)	Released	
12 May 2005	CB	(Northern Ireland)	Mark Williams	Retired (Note: Following Williams' release on 12 May 2005, he retired from professional football.)	Released	

=== Loans in ===
Date from	Position	Nationality	Name	From	Date until	Ref.
6 August 2004	GK	(England)	Paul Rachubka	(England) Charlton Athletic	6 September 2004	
26 October 2004	CM	(Australia)	Richard Johnson	(England) Queens Park Rangers	26 November 2004	
10 December 2004	CB	(England)	Paul Mitchell	(England) Wigan Athletic	10 January 2005	
23 December 2004	AM	(Australia)	Anthony Danze	(England) Crystal Palace	23 January 2005	
24 March 2005	CF	(England)	Craig Westcarr	(England) Nottingham Forest	End of season	
24 March 2005	DM	(Australia)	Trent McClenahan	(England) West Ham United	End of season	

=== Loans out ===
Date from	Position	Nationality	Name	To	Date until	Ref.
3 March 2005	CB	(Northern Ireland)	Mark Williams	(England) Rushden & Diamonds	End of season	
