= 2005–06 Milton Keynes Dons F.C. season =

Milton Keynes Dons
2005–06 season
- Chairman: Pete Winkelman
- Manager: Danny Wilson
- Stadium: National Hockey Stadium
- League One: 22nd (relegated to League Two)
- FA Cup: Third round
- League Cup: First round
- League Trophy: Quarter-final
- Top goalscorer: League: Izale McLeod (17); All: Izale McLeod (18)
- Highest home attendance: 8,426 (vs Bradford City); 26 February 2006, League One
- Lowest home attendance: 2,649 (vs Colchester United); 20 December 2005, League Trophy QF
- Average home league attendance: 5,776
- Biggest win: 0–3 (vs Barnet); 22 November 2005, League Trophy R2; 3–0 (vs Blackpool); 11 February 2006, League One
- Biggest defeat: 5–0 (vs Huddersfield Town); 18 February 2006, League One
Home colours	Away colours	Third colours

The 2005–06 season was Milton Keynes Dons' second season in their existence as a professional association football club, and their second consecutive season competing in League One.

As well as competing in League One, the club also participated in the FA Cup, League Cup and League Trophy.

The season covers the period from 1 July 2005 to 30 June 2006.

== Competitions ==
=== League One ===
==== Final table ====
Pos	Team	Pld	W	D	L	GF	GA	GD	Pts
20	Rotherham United	46	12	16	18	52	62	–10	52
21	Hartlepool United	46	11	17	18	44	59	–15	50
22	Milton Keynes Dons	46	12	14	20	45	66	–21	50
23	Swindon Town	46	11	15	20	46	65	–19	48
24	Walsall	46	11	14	21	47	70	–23	47

Source: Sky Sports

==== Matches ====
Win	Draw	Loss

Date	Opponent	Venue	Result	Scorers	Attendance	Ref
6 August 2005 – 15:00	Bournemouth	Home	2–2	McLeod (2)	5,163	
9 August 2005 – 19:45	Doncaster Rovers	Away	1–1	McLeod	5,232	
13 August 2005 – 15:00	Bradford City	Away	0–2		7,315	
20 August 2005 – 15:00	Colchester United	Home	1–1	Wilbraham	4,423	
27 August 2005 – 15:00	Bristol City	Away	2–2	Platt (2)	10,011	
29 August 2005 – 15:00	Port Vale	Home	0–0		4,592	
10 September 2005 – 15:00	Brentford	Away	0–1		5,862	
13 September 2005 – 19:45	Swansea City	Home	1–3	Mills	4,798	
17 September 2005 – 15:00	Barnsley	Home	0–0		4,620	
24 September 2005 – 15:00	Blackpool	Away	2–3	Rizzo, Small	4,723	
27 September 2005 – 19:45	Scunthorpe United	Home	1–0	Platt	4,682	
1 October 2005 – 15:00	Swindon Town	Home	3–1	Kamara, Edds, McLeod	5,536	
8 October 2005 – 15:00	Walsall	Away	1–1	Edds	5,041	
15 October 2005 – 15:00	Chesterfield	Home	0–0		5,642	
21 October 2005 – 19:45	Hartlepool United	Away	1–2	McLeod	4,337	
29 October 2005 – 15:00	Rotherham United	Home	1–1	Kamara	5,096	
12 November 2005 – 15:00	Tranmere Rovers	Away	2–1	McLeod (2)	6,611	
19 November 2005 – 15:00	Walsall	Home	2–1	McLeod, Wilbraham	5,506	
26 November 2005 – 15:00	Bournemouth	Away	0–2		5,485	
6 December 2005 – 19:45	Huddersfield Town	Home	2–2	Rizzo, McLeod	4,832	
10 December 2005 – 15:00	Doncaster Rovers	Home	2–3	Smith, Wilbraham	5,351	
17 December 2005 – 15:00	Colchester United	Away	0–2		3,400	
26 December 2005 – 15:00	Southend United	Home	0–0		7,452	
31 December 2005 – 15:00	Gillingham	Away	0–3		6,012	
2 January 2006 – 15:00	Oldham Athletic	Home	0–1		5,082	
10 January 2006 – 19:45	Swansea City	Away	1–3	McLeod	11,922	
14 January 2006 – 15:00	Yeovil Town	Home	1–1	McLeod	5,548	
21 January 2006 – 15:00	Barnsley	Away	0–2		7,588	
31 January 2006 – 19:45	Nottingham Forest	Home	1–0	McLeod	7,670	
4 February 2006 – 15:00	Scunthorpe United	Away	0–2		4,631	
11 February 2006 – 15:00	Blackpool	Home	3–0	McLeod (2), Taylor	5,691	
14 February 2006 – 19:45	Yeovil Town	Away	1–1	Harding	5,048	
18 February 2006 – 15:00	Huddersfield Town	Away	0–5		11,423	
25 February 2006 – 15:00	Bradford City	Home	2–1	Harding, Lewington	8,426	
10 March 2006 – 19:45	Bristol City	Home	0–1		6,855	
18 March 2006 – 15:00	Southend United	Home	2–1	Smith, Taylor	7,071	
25 March 2006 – 15:00	Nottingham Forest	Away	0–3		18,214	
28 March 2006 – 19:45	Brentford	Home	0–1		5,592	
1 April 2006 – 15:00	Gillingham	Home	1–2	Smith	6,432	
4 April 2006 – 19:45	Port Vale	Away	3–1	Platt	3,452	
8 April 2006 – 15:00	Oldham Athletic	Away	2–1	McLeod (2)	5,919	
15 April 2006 – 15:00	Swindon Town	Away	1–0	Platt	7,273	
17 April 2006 – 15:00	Hartlepool United	Home	2–1	Wilbraham, Taylor	6,472	
22 April 2006 – 15:00	Chesterfield	Away	2–1	Platt, Edds	3,965	
29 April 2006 – 15:00	Tranmere Rovers	Home	1–2	McLeod	7,777	
6 May 2006 – 15:00	Rotherham United	Away	0–0		7,625	

=== FA Cup ===
Matches

Win	Draw	Loss

Date	Round	Opponent	Venue	Result	Scorers	Attendance	Ref
5 November 2005 – 15:00	First round	Lincoln City	Away	1–1	Edds	3,508	
15 November 2005 – 19:45	First round (replay)	Lincoln City	Home	2–1	Platt (2)	4,029	
3 December 2005 – 15:00	Second round	Southend United	Away	2–1	McLeod, Smith	5,267	
7 January 2006 – 15:00	Third round	Southampton	Away	3–4	Lundekvam (o.g.), Rizzo, Edds	15,908	

=== League Cup ===
Matches

Win	Draw	Loss

Date	Round	Opponent	Venue	Result	Scorers	Attendance	Ref
23 August 2005 – 19:45	First round	Norwich City	Home	0–1 (Note: After extra-time. 0–0 at the conclusion of 90 minutes.)		4,777	

=== League Trophy ===
Matches

Win	Draw	Loss

Date	Round	Opponent	Venue	Result	Scorers	Attendance	Ref
18 October 2005 – 19:45	First round	Exeter City	Home	3–2	Smith (2), Wilbraham	2,745	
22 November 2005 – 19:45	Second round	Barnet	Away	3–0	Wilbraham, Small, Smith	991	
20 December 2005 – 19:45	Quarter-final (South)	Colchester United	Home	1–2	Mills	2,649	

== Player details ==
List of squad players, including number of appearances by competition.
Players with squad numbers struck through and marked † left the club during the playing season.

No.	Pos	Nat	Player	Total		League One		FA Cup		League Cup		League Trophy	
No.	Pos	Nat	Player	Apps	Goals	Apps	Goals	Apps	Goals	Apps	Goals	Apps	Goals
1	GK	(England) ENG	Matt Baker	42	0	37	0	4	0	1	0	0	0
2	DF	(Australia) AUS	Trent McClenahan	34	0	29	0	4	0	1	0	0	0
3	DF	(England) ENG	Dean Lewington	51	1	44	1	3	0	1	0	3	0
4	MF	(England) ENG	Ben Harding	11	2	10	2	0	0	0	0	1	0
5	DF	(Wales) WAL	Craig Morgan	47	0	40	0	4	0	1	0	2	0
6	DF	(England) ENG	Ben Chorley	29	0	26	0	2	0	1	0	0	0
7	MF	(England) ENG	Wade Small	35	2	28	1	4	0	1	0	2	1
8	MF	(England) ENG	Paul Mitchell	43	0	39	0	4	0	0	0	0	0
9	FW	(England) ENG	Clive Platt	45	8	40	6	4	2	1	0	0	0
10	FW	(England) ENG	Izale McLeod	46	18	39	17	4	1	1	0	2	0
11	MF	(England) ENG	Gary Smith	29	7	25	3	2	1	0	0	2	3
12	FW	(Portugal) POR	Filipe Morais	13	0	13	0	0	0	0	0	0	0
13	MF	(Australia) AUS	Gareth Edds	49	5	41	3	4	2	1	0	3	0
14	MF	(Sierra Leone) SLE	Malvin Kamara	30	2	23	2	3	0	1	0	3	0
15	FW	(Australia) AUS	Nick Rizzo	35	3	29	2	3	1	0	0	3	0
16	DF	(Nigeria) NGA	Shola Oyedele	3	0	3	0	0	0	0	0	0	0
~~17~~ †	MF	(England) ENG	Jason Puncheon	3	0	1	0	0	0	1	0	1	0
~~18~~ †	DF	(Jamaica) JAM	Nathan Koo-Boothe	1	0	0	0	0	0	0	0	1	0
19	DF	(England) ENG	Leon Crooks	29	0	23	0	3	0	0	0	3	0
20	FW	(England) ENG	Scott Taylor	17	3	17	3	0	0	0	0	0	0
21	FW	(England) ENG	Aaron Wilbraham	37	6	31	4	2	0	1	0	3	2
22	MF	(England) ENG	Nick McKoy	22	0	16	0	2	0	1	0	3	0
23	FW	(Democratic Republic of the Congo) COD	Serge Makofo	0	0	0	0	0	0	0	0	0	0
~~24~~ †	DF	(Netherlands) NED	Mirano Carrilho	4	0	3	0	0	0	1	0	0	0
24	DF	(Wales) WAL	David Partridge	18	0	18	0	0	0	0	0	0	0
25	MF	(England) ENG	Alex Tapp	0	0	0	0	0	0	0	0	0	0
~~26~~ †	DF	(England) ENG	Pablo Mills	19	2	16	1	0	0	0	0	3	1
~~27~~ †	GK	(England) ENG	Scott Bevan	0	0	0	0	0	0	0	0	0	0
~~28~~ †	FW	(France) FRA	Julien Hornuss	0	0	0	0	0	0	0	0	0	0
~~29~~ †	MF	(Republic of Ireland) IRL	Stephen Quinn	19	0	15	0	1	0	0	0	3	0
~~30~~ †	MF	(England) ENG	Mark Ricketts	7	0	5	0	2	0	0	0	0	0
31	FW	(England) ENG	Sam Baldock	1	0	0	0	0	0	0	0	1	0
32	GK	(Portugal) POR	Ricardo Batista	9	0	9	0	0	0	0	0	0	0

== Transfers ==
=== Transfers in ===
Date from	Position	Name	From	Fee	Ref.
1 July 2005	MF	(England) Paul Mitchell	Wigan Athletic	Free transfer	
4 July 2005	DF	(Wales) Craig Morgan	(Wales) Wrexham	Undisclosed	
6 July 2005	FW	(England) Aaron Wilbraham	Free agent (Note: Previous club: Hull City.)	Free transfer	
22 August 2005	DF	(Netherlands) Mirano Carrilho	Free agent (Note: Previous club: FC Dordrecht.)	Free transfer	
17 January 2006	FW	(England) Scott Taylor	Plymouth Argyle	£100,000	

=== Transfers out ===
Date from	Position	Name	To	Fee	Ref.
October 2005	DF	(England) Steve Palmer	Retired		
January 2006	GK	(England) Scott Bevan	Retired		
January 2006	DF	(Netherlands) Mirano Carrilho	Released (Note: Joined AGOVV Apeldoorn on 12 January 2006.)		
January 2006	FW	(England) Jason Puncheon	Released (Note: Joined Fisher Athletic in January 2006.)		
January 2006	GK	(England) David Martin	Liverpool	Undisclosed	
February 2006	DF	(Jamaica) Nathan Koo-Boothe	Released (Note: Joined Kettering Town in January 2006.)		
15 May 2006	FW	(England) Wade Small	Sheffield Wednesday	Undisclosed	

=== Loans in ===
Start date	Position	Name	From	End date	Ref.
16 August 2005	DF	(Australia) Trent McClenahan	West Ham United	End of season	
31 August 2005	MF	(England) Pablo Mills	Derby County	1 January 2006	
22 September 2005	MF	(Republic of Ireland) Stephen Quinn	Sheffield United	January 2006	
4 November 2005	DF	(England) Mark Ricketts	Charlton Athletic	February 2006	
13 January 2006	GK	(Portugal) Ricardo Batista	Fulham	End of season	
19 January 2006	DF	(England) David Partridge	Bristol City	End of season	
27 January 2006	FW	(Portugal) Filipe Morais	Chelsea	End of season	

=== Loans out ===
Start date	Position	Name	To	End date	Ref.
10 February 2006	DF	(Nigeria) Shola Oyedele	Woking	End of season	
