= 2003–04 Wimbledon F.C. season =

Wimbledon
2003–04 season
- Chairman: Pete Winkelman
- Manager: Stuart Murdoch
- Stadium: Selhurst Park (until September); National Hockey Stadium (from September)
- First Division: 24th (relegated)
- FA Cup: Fourth round
- League Cup: First round
- Top goalscorer: Patrick Agyemang (6)
- Average home league attendance: 4,750

During the 2003–04 English football season, Wimbledon F.C. competed in the First Division. This was Wimbledon's last season before changing its club name to Milton Keynes Dons after being given permission by the Football League.

== Season summary ==
Wimbledon entered administration in June 2003, and played their first match at the National Hockey Stadium in Milton Keynes in September. Although crowds improved at the club's new base, the administrator sold any player who could command a transfer fee and Murdoch's team finished bottom. The club was brought out of administration at the end of the season, and subsequently reformed as Milton Keynes Dons.

== Final league table ==
Pos	Team	Pld	W	D	L	GF	GA	GD	Pts	Promotion, qualification or relegation
20	Derby County	46	13	13	20	53	67	−14	52	
21	Gillingham	46	14	9	23	48	67	−19	51	
22	Walsall (R)	46	13	12	21	45	65	−20	51	Relegation to Football League One
23	Bradford City (R)	46	10	6	30	38	69	−31	36	Relegation to Football League One
24	Wimbledon (R)	46	8	5	33	41	89	−48	29	Renamed Milton Keynes Dons in Football League One

Source: Soccerway
Rules for classification: 1) points; 2) goal difference; 3) number of goals scored.
(R) Relegated

== Results ==
Wimbledon's score comes first

=== Legend ===
Win	Draw	Loss

=== Football League First Division ===
Date	Opponent	Venue	Result	Attendance	Scorers
9 August 2003	Crewe Alexandra	H	3–1	1,145	Agyemang, Tapp, Reo-Coker
16 August 2003	Stoke City	A	1–2	12,550	Agyemang
23 August 2003	Crystal Palace	H	1–3	6,113	Reo-Coker
26 August 2003	Norwich City	A	2–3	16,082	Holdsworth, Leigertwood
30 August 2003	Reading	H	0–3	2,066	
13 September 2003	Wigan Athletic	H	2–4	1,054	Agyemang, McAnuff
16 September 2003	Millwall	A	0–2	7,855	
20 September 2003	Ipswich Town	A	1–4	23,428	Agyemang
27 September 2003	Burnley	H	2–2	5,639	Holdsworth, Agyemang
30 September 2003	Sheffield United	H	1–2	6,016	Nowland
4 October 2003	Preston North End	A	0–1	13,801	
15 October 2003	Coventry City	A	0–1	10,872	
18 October 2003	Nottingham Forest	A	0–6	23,520	
21 October 2003	West Bromwich Albion	A	1–0	22,048	McAnuff
25 October 2003	Watford	H	1–3	6,115	Leigertwood
1 November 2003	Bradford City	H	2–1	3,334	Small, Reo-Coker
8 November 2003	Rotherham United	H	1–3	5,777	Nowland
15 November 2003	Gillingham	A	2–1	9,061	Nowland, Agyemang
22 November 2003	Cardiff City	H	0–1	5,056	
25 November 2003	West Ham United	H	1–1	8,118	McAnuff
29 November 2003	Derby County	A	1–3	22,025	Reo-Coker
6 December 2003	Rotherham United	H	1–2	3,061	Holdsworth (pen)
13 December 2003	Walsall	H	0–1	3,315	
20 December 2003	Sunderland	A	1–2	22,334	Thirlwell (own goal)
26 December 2003	Reading	A	3–0	14,486	Small, Lewington, McAnuff
30 December 2003	West Bromwich Albion	H	0–0	6,376	
10 January 2004	Crewe Alexandra	A	0–1	6,234	
17 January 2004	Stoke City	H	0–1	3,623	
31 January 2004	Crystal Palace	A	1–3	20,552	McAnuff
7 February 2004	Norwich City	H	0–1	7,368	
21 February 2004	Coventry City	H	0–3	5,905	
28 February 2004	Watford	A	0–4	15,323	
2 March 2004	Nottingham Forest	H	0–1	6,317	
9 March 2004	West Ham United	A	0–5	29,818	
13 March 2004	Walsall	A	0–1	6,889	
24 March 2004	Millwall	H	0–1	3,037	
27 March 2004	Ipswich Town	H	1–2	6,389	Smith
3 April 2004	Wigan Athletic	A	1–0	7,622	Chorley
6 April 2004	Sunderland	H	1–2	4,800	Kamara
10 April 2004	Preston North End	H	3–3	2,866	Gray (2), Chorley
12 April 2004	Sheffield United	A	1–2	19,391	Gray (pen)
17 April 2004	Bradford City	A	3–2	9,011	Kamara, Smith, Gray
20 April 2004	Burnley	A	0–2	13,555	
24 April 2004	Gillingham	H	1–2	5,049	Smith
1 May 2004	Cardiff City	A	1–1	15,337	Williams
9 May 2004	Derby County	H	1–0	6,509	Darlington

=== FA Cup ===
Round	Date	Opponent	Venue	Result	Attendance	Goalscorers
R3	3 January 2004	Stoke City	H	1–1	3,609	Nowland
R3R	13 January 2004	Stoke City	A	1–0	6,463	Nowland
R4	24 January 2004	Birmingham City	A	0–1	22,159	

=== League Cup ===
Round	Date	Opponent	Venue	Result	Attendance	Goalscorers
R1	12 August 2003	Wycombe Wanderers	A	0–2	1,986	

== Players ==
=== First-team squad ===
Squad at end of season

Note: Flags indicate national team as defined under FIFA eligibility rules; some limited exceptions apply. Players may hold more than one non-FIFA nationality.

No.	Pos.	Nation	Player
1	GK	ENG	Scott Bevan
3	DF	ENG	Peter Hawkins
4	MF	ENG	Nick McKoy
5	DF	NIR	Mark Williams (Note: Williams was born in Stalybridge, England, but also qualified to represent Northern Ireland internationally and made his international debut for Northern Ireland in 1999.)
6	DF	ENG	Darren Holloway
7	DF	FRA	Harry Ntimban-Zeh
8	MF	ENG	Wade Small
10	FW	ENG	Dean Holdsworth
12	GK	ENG	David Martin
14	FW	ENG	Lionel Morgan
15	MF	SLE	Albert Jarrett
16	FW	ENG	Jamie Mackie (Note: Mackie was born in Dorking, England, but also qualified to represent Scotland internationally through his grandfather and made his international debut for Scotland in October 2010.)
17	DF	NGA	Shola Oyedele

No.	Pos.	Nation	Player
18	FW	ENG	Wayne Gray
19	DF	ENG	Ben Chorley
20	MF	ENG	Gary Smith (on loan from Middlesbrough)
21	DF	GER	Nico Herzig
22	DF	ENG	Rob Gier (Note: Gier was born in Ascot, England, but also qualified to represent the Philippines internationally through his mother and made his international debut for the Philippines in April 2009.)
23	MF	ENG	Alex Tapp
24	DF	ENG	Jermaine Darlington
25	DF	ENG	Dean Lewington
26	MF	ENG	Jason Puncheon
27	MF	ENG	Michael Gordon
28	MF	ENG	Malvin Kamara (Note: Kamara was born in Greenwich, England, but also qualified to represent Sierra Leone internationally and made his international debut for Sierra Leone in June 2007.)
29	MF	ENG	Ben Harding
30	GK	WAL	Lee Worgan (Note: Worgan was born in Eastbourne, England, but also qualified to represent Wales internationally and represented Wales at U-19 and U-21 level.)

=== Left club during season ===
Note: Flags indicate national team as defined under FIFA eligibility rules; some limited exceptions apply. Players may hold more than one non-FIFA nationality.

No.	Pos.	Nation	Player
1	GK	ENG	Steve Banks (to Gillingham)
2	DF	ENG	Warren Barton (retired)
7	MF	JAM	Jobi McAnuff (Note: McAnuff was born in Enfield, England, but also qualified to represent Jamaica internationally through his father and made his international debut for Jamaica in May 2002.) (to West Ham United)
7	MF	ENG	Jamal Campbell-Ryce (Note: Campbell-Ryce was born in Lambeth, England, but also qualified to represent Jamaica internationally and made his international debut for Jamaica in 2003.) (on loan from Charlton Athletic)
9	FW	AUS	Scott McDonald (to Motherwell)
11	FW	GHA	Patrick Agyemang (Note: Agyemang was born in Waltham Forest, England, but also qualified to represent Ghana internationally and made his international debut for Ghana in May 2003.) (to Gillingham)

No.	Pos.	Nation	Player
13	GK	ENG	Paul Heald (retired)
17	MF	ENG	Adam Nowland (to West Ham United)
20	DF	ENG	Mikele Leigertwood (Note: Leigertwood was born in Enfield, England, but also qualified to represent Antigua and Barbuda internationally and made his international debut for Antigua and Barbuda in November 2008.) (to Crystal Palace)
26	MF	ENG	Nigel Reo-Coker (to West Ham United)
30	GK	ENG	Shane Gore (to Barnet)

== Statistics ==
=== Appearances and goals ===
No.	Pos	Nat	Player	Total		First Division		FA Cup		League Cup	
No.	Pos	Nat	Player	Apps	Goals	Apps	Goals	Apps	Goals	Apps	Goals
Goalkeepers
1	GK	(England) ENG	Scott Bevan	10	0	10	0	0	0	0	0
12	GK	(England) ENG	David Martin	2	0	2	0	0	0	0	0
13	GK	(England) ENG	Paul Heald	10	0	10	0	0	0	0	0
30	GK	(Wales) WAL	Lee Worgan	3	0	0+3	0	0	0	0	0
Defenders
2	DF	(England) ENG	Warren Barton	5	0	5	0	0	0	0	0
3	DF	(England) ENG	Peter Hawkins	20	0	16+2	0	0+1	0	1	0
5	DF	(Northern Ireland) NIR	Mark Williams	11	1	11	1	0	0	0	0
6	DF	(England) ENG	Darren Holloway	14	0	8+5	0	0	0	1	0
7	DF	(England) ENG	Harry Ntimban-Zeh	10	0	9+1	0	0	0	0	0
17	DF	(Nigeria) NGA	Shola Oyedele	9	0	9	0	0	0	0	0
19	DF	(England) ENG	Ben Chorley	38	2	33+2	2	1+1	0	1	0
21	DF	(Germany) GER	Nico Herzig	19	0	18+1	0	0	0	0	0
22	DF	(Philippines) PHI	Rob Gier	29	0	24+1	0	3	0	0+1	0
25	DF	(England) ENG	Dean Lewington	31	1	28	1	3	0	0	0
Midfielders
4	MF	(England) ENG	Nick McKoy	3	0	1+2	0	0	0	0	0
15	MF	(Sierra Leone) SLE	Albert Jarrett	10	0	3+6	0	0	0	0+1	0
20	MF	(England) ENG	Gary Smith	11	3	10+1	3	0	0	0	0
23	MF	(England) ENG	Alex Tapp	16	1	12+2	1	1	0	1	0
24	MF	(England) ENG	Jermaine Darlington	45	1	40+1	1	3	0	1	0
26	MF	(England) ENG	Jason Puncheon	8	0	6+2	0	0	0	0	0
27	MF	(England) ENG	Michael Gordon	21	0	8+11	0	0+1	0	1	0
28	MF	(Sierra Leone) SLE	Malvin Kamara	27	2	15+12	2	0	0	0	0
29	MF	(England) ENG	Ben Harding	16	0	10+5	0	1	0	0	0
Forwards
8	FW	(England) ENG	Wade Small	30	2	23+4	2	3	0	0	0
10	FW	(England) ENG	Dean Holdsworth	31	3	14+14	3	2	0	0+1	0
14	FW	(England) ENG	Lionel Morgan	3	0	2+1	0	0	0	0	0
16	FW	(Scotland) SCO	Jamie Mackie	16	0	8+5	0	2+1	0	0	0
18	FW	(England) ENG	Wayne Gray	35	4	20+12	4	1+2	0	0	0
Players left during the season
1	GK	(England) ENG	Steve Banks	28	0	24	0	3	0	1	0
7	MF	(Jamaica) JAM	Jobi McAnuff	30	5	25+2	5	3	0	0	0
7	MF	(Jamaica) JAM	Jamal Campbell-Ryce	4	0	3+1	0	0	0	0	0
9	FW	(Australia) AUS	Scott McDonald	2	0	0+2	0	0	0	0	0
11	FW	(Ghana) GHA	Patrick Agyemang	28	6	23+3	6	1	0	1	0
17	MF	(England) ENG	Adam Nowland	28	5	24+1	3	2	2	1	0
20	MF	(Antigua and Barbuda) ATG	Mikele Leigertwood	31	2	27	2	3	0	1	0
26	MF	(England) ENG	Nigel Reo-Coker	27	4	25	4	1	0	1	0
