= Nick McKoy =

English footballer (born 1986)

Personal information
- Date of birth: 3 September 1986 (age 40)
- Place of birth: Newham, England
- Position: Midfielder

Youth career
- Wimbledon

Senior career*
Years	Team	Apps	(Gls)
2003–2004	Wimbledon	3	(0)
2004–2006	Milton Keynes Dons	16	(0)
2006–2007	Cardiff City	0	(0)
2007	→ Torquay United (loan)	4	(0)
2008	Potters Bar Town	1	(0)
2008	St Johnstone	5	(0)
2009	Enfield Town	22	(2)
2009	Grays Athletic	0	(0)
2009–2010	Sutton United	2	(0)
2010–2011	Kettering Town	30	(3)
2011–2012	Northampton Town	6	(0)
2012	Tamworth	14	(0)
2012	Sutton United	8	(0)
2012	AFC Hornchurch	3	(0)
2013–2014	Southern Stars	0	(0)
Total		114	(5)
- * Club domestic league appearances and goals

Nicholas Paul McKoy (born 3 September 1986) is an English former professional footballer who played as a midfielder. Following a match fixing scandal, McKoy was banned from the sport for life by FIFA in 2014.

== Playing career ==
McKoy was born in Newham and began his career as a trainee with Wimbledon. He made his league debut on 13 December 2003 as a late substitute for Alex Tapp in a 1–0 defeat at home to Walsall. He remained with the Dons as they became Milton Keynes Dons until being released at the end of the 2005–06 season.

After being released by the Dons, he was signed by Championship side Cardiff City. He joined Torquay United on loan in January 2007 until the end of the 2006–07 season. He made his Torquay debut two days later in the 2–0 defeat at home to Southampton in the FA Cup. He was released by Cardiff in May 2007, having only made one appearance for them during a 2–0 loss to Barnet in the Football League Cup.

He went on trial at Shrewsbury Town in December 2007, playing for their reserve team. This was followed by a trial spell with St Johnstone during which he played in reserve matches against East Fife and Livingston. After trial spells with clubs including Barnet, Yeovil Town and Dagenham & Redbridge, McKoy signed a contract until the end of 2008 with St Johnstone on 21 August 2008. McKoy played in five league games for Saints before being released in December 2008. He signed for Enfield Town on New Year's Day 2009.

McKoy signed for Grays Athletic on 26 June 2009, along with Serge Makofo, Marcel McKie and Allan McLeod. He was released from Grays Athletic without making an appearance and joined Bishop's Stortford on trial in August. McKoy signed for Sutton United on 22 December, making his debut in the 3–0 home win against Carshalton Athletic on 28 December. He left in January 2010, citing personal reasons. He joined Kettering Town in October 2010. He went on to make 30 league appearances for the club, before joining Northampton Town in July 2011. He was sent off on 13 September 2011 against AFC Wimbledon, and this followed his sending off in his previous game. However, McKoy's contract was cancelled on 5 January 2012, by manager Aidy Boothroyd who stated he "was not going to be a part of the future". Although, Boothroyd did state that McKoy did have "a move lined up".

He signed for Tamworth a day later to link up with manager Marcus Law again, having worked under at Kettering Town. McKoy made his debut against Everton at Goodison Park in a Third Round FA Cup tie, which Tamworth lost 2–0. McKoy resigned for Sutton United at the start of the 2012–13 season, and played nine times without being on the winning side. He was released on 2 October 2012.

McKoy briefly signed with Australian Victorian Premier League club Southern Stars in 2013 where he made several appearances, however due to his involvement in a match fixing scandal during that season, his appearances for the club were removed from official record. McKoy was later banned from the sport for life by FIFA.

== Match fixing ==
McKoy was arrested on 15 September 2013 on suspicion of match fixing while playing with the Southern Stars in the Victorian Premier League in Australia. He pleaded guilty to three counts of "offering to engage in conduct to corrupt a betting outcome" at Melbourne Magistrates Court, and was subsequently banned from football by FIFA for life and fined $1,500 by the courts. In 2016, he approached the FFA about having his ban overturned.

== Career statistics ==
Appearances and goals by club, season and competition
Club	Season	League			FA Cup		League Cup		Other (Note: Appearances in Football League Trophy and FA Trophy)		Total	
Club	Season	Division	Apps	Goals	Apps	Goals	Apps	Goals	Apps	Goals	Apps	Goals
Wimbledon	2003–04	First Division	3	0	0	0	0	0	—		3	0
Milton Keynes Dons	2004–05	League One	0	0	0	0	0	0	1	0	1	0
Milton Keynes Dons	2005–06	League One	16	0	2	0	1	0	3	0	22	0
Milton Keynes Dons	Total		16	0	2	0	1	0	4	0	23	0
Cardiff City	2006–07	Championship	0	0	0	0	1	0	—		1	0
Torquay United (loan)	2006–07	League Two	4	0	1	0	0	0	0	0	5	0
Potters Bar Town	2007–08	Isthmian Division 1N	1	0	—		—		—		1	0
St Johnstone	2008–09	Scottish First Division	5	0	0	0	1	0	0	0	6	0
Enfield Town	2008–09	Isthmian Division 1N	22	2	—		—		—		22	2
Grays Athletic	2009–10	Conference Premier	0	0	—		—		—		0	0
Sutton United	2009–10	Isthmian Premier	2	0	—		—		—		2	0
Kettering Town	2010–11	Conference Premier	30	3	1	0	—		2	0	33	3
Northampton Town	2011–12	League Two	6	0	0	0	2	0	1	0	9	0
Tamworth	2011–12	Conference Premier	14	0	1	0	—		—		15	0
Sutton United	2012–13	Conference South	8	0	0	0	—		—		8	0
AFC Hornchurch	2012–13	Conference South	3	0	0	0	—		—		3	0
Career total			114	5	5	0	5	0	7	0	131	5
