= 2004–05 Wigan Athletic F.C. season =

- Chairman: Dave Whelan
- Manager: Paul Jewell
- Stadium: JJB Stadium
- Championship: 2nd (promoted)
- FA Cup: Third round proper
- League Cup: First round
- Top goalscorer: League: Nathan Ellington (24); All: Nathan Ellington (24)
- Highest home attendance: 20,745 (vs. Sunderland, 5 April)
- Lowest home attendance: 7,547 (vs. Crewe Alexandra, 19 October)
- Average home league attendance: 11,562

During the 2004–05 English football season, Wigan Athletic F.C. competed in the Football League Championship.

== Season summary ==
After only 27 years as a Football League club, Wigan Athletic won promotion to English football's top flight for the first time in their history, securing promotion on the final day of the Championship league campaign as runners-up in their division. This was also their highest-ever finish in the Football League in their history. It was also only Wigan's second season in the second tier of the English league, having just missed out on the playoffs a year earlier.

Wigan's league success did not translate to the domestic cup competitions: they only played one match in each cup before being knocked out. This may have turned out to be beneficial to Wigan, as it allowed the club to focus on the league rather than a cup run.

== First-team squad ==
Squad at end of season

Note: Flags indicate national team as defined under FIFA eligibility rules; some limited exceptions apply. Players may hold more than one non-FIFA nationality.

No.	Pos.	Nation	Player
1	GK	AUS	John Filan
2	DF	ENG	Paul Mitchell
3	MF	SCO	Stephen McMillan
4	DF	ENG	Matt Jackson
5	DF	BRA	Emerson Thome
6	DF	ENG	Ian Breckin
7	FW	SCO	David Graham
8	MF	SWE	Andreas Johansson
9	FW	ENG	Nathan Ellington
10	FW	SCO	Lee McCulloch
11	MF	IRL	Graham Kavanagh
13	GK	ENG	Gary Walsh
14	MF	IRL	Alan Mahon

No.	Pos.	Nation	Player
15	DF	ENG	David Wright
18	MF	ENG	Jason Jarrett
19	DF	ENG	Nicky Eaden
20	MF	SCO	Gary Teale
21	MF	ENG	Jimmy Bullard
22	FW	BRA	Magno Vieira
23	GK	ENG	James Salisbury
24	MF	IRL	Gareth Whalley
25	MF	ENG	Anthony Stephan
26	DF	ENG	Leighton Baines
30	FW	GRN	Jason Roberts
37	DF	ENG	Kevin Lee

=== Left club during season ===
Note: Flags indicate national team as defined under FIFA eligibility rules; some limited exceptions apply. Players may hold more than one non-FIFA nationality.

No.	Pos.	Nation	Player
2	DF	ENG	Paul Mitchell (on loan to MK Dons)
8	FW	WAL	Neil Roberts (to Doncaster Rovers)
12	MF	WAL	Michael Flynn (to Gillingham)
16	MF	ENG	Tony Dinning (to Bristol City)
16	FW	ENG	Brett Ormerod (on loan from Southampton)

No.	Pos.	Nation	Player
17	MF	DEN	Per Frandsen (Retired)
25	DF	ENG	Chris Lynch (to Hyde)
27	FW	ENG	David Moore (to Hyde)
28	MF	ENG	Greg Traynor (to Hyde)

== Transfers ==
=== In ===
Date	Name	Club From	Fee	Reference
24 May 2004	Per Frandsen	Bolton Wanderers	Free	
16 June 2004	David Graham	Torquay United	£215,000	
28 June 2004	David Wright	Crewe Alexandra	Undisclosed	
4 August 2004	Emerson Thome	Bolton Wanderers	Free	
15 September 2004	Gareth Whalley	Cardiff City	Free	
8 January 2005	Andreas Johansson	Djurgardens IF	Undisclosed	
4 March 2005	Graham Kavanagh	Cardiff City	£400,000	

=== Out ===
Date	Name	Club To	Fee	Reference
26 May 2004	Jason de Vos	Ipswich Town	Free	
23 June 2004	Andy Liddell	Sheffield United	Free	
28 July 2004	Peter Kennedy	Peterborough United	Free	
7 October 2004	Neil Roberts	Doncaster Rovers	£90,000	
6 December 2004	Tony Dinning	Bristol City	Free	
19 January 2005	Per Frandsen	Retired		
2 February 2005	Michael Flynn	Gillingham	Free	

=== Loans in ===
Player	Pos	From	Start Date	End Date	Notes
Brett Ormerod	FW	Southampton	18 March 2005	26 April 2005	

=== Loans out ===
Player	Pos	To	Start Date	End Date	Notes
Tony Dinning	MF	Ipswich Town	9 August 2004	1 October 2004	
Paul Mitchell	DF	Swindon Town	3 September 2004	21 October 2004	
Tony Dinning	MF	Bristol City	27 October 2004	27 November 2004	
Paul Mitchell	DF	Milton Keynes Dons	9 December 2004	9 March 2005	
Jason Jarrett	MF	Stoke City	7 January 2005	7 February 2005	
David Moore	FW	Bury	21 January 2005	15 March 2005	

== Pre-season ==
Pre-season friendlies
Date	Opponent	Venue	Result	Score	Scorers	Attendance
13 July 2004	KFC Verbroedering Geel	A	W	3–1	McCulloch, J. Roberts, Vieira	
15 July 2004	Patro Maasmechelen	A	W	4–0	Flynn, McCulloch, Graham (2)	
20 July 2004	Southport	A	D	1–1	J. Roberts	
21 July 2004	Leigh RMI	A	D	1–1	N. Roberts	
24 July 2004	Bury	A	W	4–0	J. Roberts (2), Ellington (2)	
27 July 2004	Halifax Town	A	W	3–0	Bullard, J. Roberts, Ellington (pen.)	
28 July 2004	Burscough	A	W	5–4	N. Roberts (2), Dinning, Moore, Vieira	
1 August 2004	Blackpool	A	W	5–0	McCulloch, Frandsen, Ellington (2), Graham	2,890

== Results ==
=== Football League Championship ===
Championship match details
Date	Opponent	Venue	Result	Score	Scorers	Attendance
7 August 2004	Nottingham Forest	H	D	1–1	McCulloch	12,035
10 August 2004	Millwall	A	W	2–0	McCulloch, Roberts	10,660
15 August 2004	West Ham United	A	W	3–1	Ellington (2), Roberts	23,271
21 August 2004	Brighton & Hove Albion	H	W	3–0	Ellington (2), Frandsen	8,681
28 August 2004	Sunderland	A	D	1–1	Roberts	26,330
30 August 2004	Cardiff City	H	W	2–1	Ellington (pen.), Roberts	9,004
11 September 2004	Wolverhampton Wanderers	A	D	3–3	Jackson, Ellington, Roberts (pen.)	26,790
14 September 2004	Burnley	H	D	0–0		9,746
18 September 2004	Sheffield United	H	W	4–0	Ellington (2), Roberts (2)	10,682
25 September 2004	Derby County	A	D	1–1	McCulloch	26,113
28 September 2004	Watford	A	D	0–0		11,161
2 October 2004	Rotherham United	H	W	2–0	Roberts, Mahon	7,937
16 October 2004	Plymouth Argyle	A	W	2–1	Roberts (2)	14,443
19 October 2004	Crewe Alexandra	H	W	4–1	McCulloch, Ellington (2), Bullard	7,547
23 October 2004	Coventry City	H	W	4–1	Mahon, Graham, Ellington, Flynn	9,632
31 October 2004	Leeds United	A	W	2–0	Mahon, Bullard	27,432
2 November 2004	Stoke City	A	W	1–0	McCulloch	15,882
6 November 2004	Plymouth Argyle	H	L	0–2		10,294
22 November 2004	Queens Park Rangers	A	L	0–1		15,804
29 November 2004	Leicester City	H	D	0–0		10,924
2 December 2004	Reading	A	D	1–1	Mahon	22,114
6 December 2004	Preston North End	H	W	5–0	McCulloch, Mahon, Ellington (2), Roberts (pen.)	10,565
13 December 2004	Gillingham	H	W	2–0	Ellington, McCulloch	8,451
21 December 2004	Ipswich Town	A	L	1–2	Baines	28,286
26 December 2004	Derby County	H	L	1–2	Roberts	12,420
28 December 2004	Burnley	A	L	0–1		16,485
1 January 2005	Sheffield United	A	W	2–0	McCulloch, Ellington	21,869
4 January 2005	Wolverhampton Wanderers	H	W	2–0	Ellington (2, 1 pen.)	10,335
15 January 2005	Rotherham United	A	W	2–0	Teale, Roberts	9,050
22 January 2005	Watford	H	D	2–2	McCulloch (2)	9,008
5 February 2005	Stoke City	H	L	0–1		9,938
12 February 2005	Crewe Alexandra	A	W	3–1	Roberts (2), Ellington (pen.)	7,981
19 February 2005	Leeds United	H	W	3–0	Ellington, Roberts, Mahon	17,177
23 February 2005	Coventry City	A	W	2–1	Teale, Ellington	12,130
26 February 2005	Gillingham	A	L	1–2	Ellington	7,209
5 March 2005	Ipswich Town	H	W	1–0	Ellington (pen.)	16,744
12 March 2005	Millwall	H	W	2–0	Ellington (pen.), Roberts	9,614
15 March 2005	Brighton & Hove Albion	A	W	4–2	Bullard, McCulloch, Teale, Roberts	6,306
19 March 2005	Nottingham Forest	A	D	1–1	McCulloch	24,008
2 April 2005	West Ham United	H	L	1–2	Roberts	12,933
5 April 2005	Sunderland	H	L	0–1		20,745
9 April 2005	Cardiff City	A	W	2–0	Roberts, Mahon	16,858
16 April 2005	Leicester City	A	W	2–0	Ormerod (2)	23,894
23 April 2005	Queens Park Rangers	H	D	0–0		12,007
30 April 2005	Preston North End	A	D	1–1	McCulloch	20,221
8 May 2005	Reading	H	W	3–1	McCulloch, Roberts, Ellington	19,662

=== FA Cup ===
Wigan were drawn against Derby County in the third round of the FA Cup. The Latics took the lead in the first half, but were ultimately defeated 2–1 by their opponents. Jewell admitted after the game that he had rested several key players in order to concentrate on the league.

FA Cup match details
Round	Date	Opponent	Venue	Result	Score	Scorers	Attendance
Third	8 January 2005	Derby County	A	L	1–2	Mahon	14,457

=== League Cup ===
Wigan were defeated in the first round of the League Cup by their League Two opponents Grimsby Town.

League Cup match details
Round	Date	Opponent	Venue	Result	Score	Scorers	Attendance
First	24 August 2004	Grimsby Town	A	L	0–1		3,005
