= Dingley Stars FC =

Dingley Stars
- Full name: Dingley Stars Football Club
- Nickname: Genclikgucu
- Founded: 1974
- Ground: Frederick Watchter Reserve
- Capacity: 2000
- Chairman: Kazim Fat
- Manager: Hasan Karakoc
- League: Greater Melbourne Soccer Association Division 1
- 2026: 3rd
Home colours	Away colours

Dingley Stars Football Club was an association football club from the South-Eastern suburbs of Melbourne, Victoria. Formed in 1974, the club was formerly known as Dingley City Soccer Club which was changed in 2004 to Southern Stars FC, and then to Dingley Stars at the end of the 2014 season. Currently competing in the Victorian State League Division 1, their senior home ground is Kingston Heath, and their juniors base at Chadwick Reserve, Howard Road, Dingle. Club colours are red and white (full red kit home, full white kit away). After an unsuccessful year in 2009, Southern Stars FC were relegated to the Victorian State League Division 2, it is the club's first time getting relegated in its 36-year history. The following year in 2010 finished 1st getting promoted back to State 1. Then in 2011 the club finished 2nd only by goal difference to be promoted to the Victorian Premier League. Dingley Stars suffered immensely after a match fixing scandal tarnished the club’s reputation. They fell to the bottom of the Victorian pyramid playing in the State League 5 South in 2022. As of 2026 they play in the Greater Melbourne Soccer Association second tier, the GMSA division 1. They now go by South East United.

== History ==
Cheltenham Soccer Club, also known as Cheltenham Spor, was established in 1974 by members of Melbourne's Turkish Australian community. Fifteen years later, in 1989, it changed its name to Mentone ATA Soccer Club (ATA Spor), however, in 1990 Mentone ATA Soccer Club ceased officially as a soccer club. In 1991 two friends Okan Yildar and Aykut Sakranlioglu re-established a Turkish-based Soccer Club and named it Parkdale Soccer Club (Genclik Gucu (Youth Power)), which in 1995 moved to Dingley and changed its name once again, but this time to Dingley City Soccer Club, while retaining its Turkish name of Genclik Gucu.

The club was known was Southern Stars (Genclik Gucu) Football Club, the club had outgrown the ground Chadwick Reserve in Dingley. The club's senior and reserve teams moved to Ross Reserve and then Kingston Heath Soccer Complex, while Chadwick Reserve remained the home of the club's junior teams. Today Dingley Stars FC has players from all cultural backgrounds and recently moved back to their traditional home ground Chadwick Reserve for all matches.

== Club performance history ==

2003: Victorian State League Division 3 – 9th
2004: Victorian State League Division 3 – 2nd [Promoted]
2005: Victorian State League Division 2 – 8th
2006: Victorian State League Division 2 – 2nd [Promoted]
2007: Victorian State League Division 1 – 3rd
2008: Victorian State League Division 1 – 4th
2009: Victorian State League Division 1 – 12th [Relegated]
2010: Victorian State League Division 2 – 1st [Promoted]
2011: Victorian State League Division 1 – 2nd [Promoted]
2012: Victorian Premier League – 10th
2013: Victorian Premier League – 12th [Relegated]
2014: Victorian State League Division 1 – 12th [Relegated]
2015: Victorian State League Division 2 – 12th [Relegated]
2016: Victorian State League Division 3 – 6th
2017: Victorian State League Division 3 – 10th
2018: Victorian State League Division 3 – 12th [Relegated]
2019: Victorian State League Division 4 – 7th

== Match fixing scandal ==
On 15 September 2013 Victoria Police arrested up to ten people, including Southern Stars players David Obaze, Nick McKoy and Joe Woolley and coach, Zaya Younan. Later in September criminal charges were laid via the Victoria Police and the FFA handed Noel, Woolley, David Obaze, Nicholas McKoy and coach Zia Younan initial suspensions which prevented them from being involved in any football-related activity in Australia while the investigation was ongoing. Those bans were also extended worldwide by FIFA. Two British footballers, Reiss Noel and Joe Woolley received life-time bans from FIFA due to the incident.

Gerry Subramaniam, a Malaysian national and the Australian ring-leader of the betting syndicate behind the match fixing, was sentenced to three years jail in Australia, to be followed by deportation to Malaysia.
