= Paul Mitchell (footballer, born 1981) =

English footballer and Sporting Director

Personal information
- Date of birth: 26 August 1981 (age 45)
- Place of birth: Stalybridge, England
- Height: 5 ft 9 in (1.75 m)
- Positions: Defender; midfielder

Youth career
- 1999–2000: Wigan Athletic

Senior career*
Years	Team	Apps	(Gls)
2000–2005	Wigan Athletic	64	(0)
2001	→ Halifax Town (loan)	11	(0)
2004	→ Swindon Town (loan)	7	(0)
2004–2005	→ Milton Keynes Dons (loan)	13	(0)
2005–2009	Milton Keynes Dons	59	(0)
2007	→ Wrexham (loan)	5	(0)
2008	→ Barnet (loan)	3	(0)
Total		162	(0)
- * Club domestic league appearances and goals

Paul Alexander Mitchell (born 26 August 1981) is an English football director and former professional player. He was most recently the sporting director for Premier League club Newcastle United from 2024 to 2025.

As a player, Mitchell began playing with the youth teams of Manchester City and Wigan Athletic, making his senior debut with the latter. He also played for Halifax Town, Swindon Town and Milton Keynes Dons on loan, whom he later joined permanently. Mitchell also had loan spells with Wrexham and Barnet before injuries forced an early retirement at the age of 27.

Mitchell has worked with Milton Keynes Dons, Southampton, Tottenham Hotspur and RB Leipzig on player recruitment and Monaco on sporting director.

== Playing career ==
=== Wigan Athletic ===
Mitchell began playing in the youth ranks of local club Manchester City before joining Football League Second Division side Wigan Athletic in 1999. On 7 December, Mitchell made his senior debut in a 2–1 victory against Burnley in the Football League Trophy First Round. After one season in the youth ranks, he was promoted to the senior squad and marked his 19th birthday with his league debut – a 3–1 win away to Wrexham. Introduced as a 64th minute substitute, Mitchell was dismissed with a straight red card after just eight minutes for a professional foul on Carlos Edwards.

In March 2001, Mitchell joined Football League Third Division club Halifax Town on loan for the remainder of the season. On 24 March, he made his debut in a 3–0 win against Barnet. Mitchell made a further 10 appearances as the club narrowly avoided relegation to the National League by just two points.

Mitchell returned to Wigan for the 2001–02 campaign and made 25 appearances in his first season back after breaking into the first team. He remained a regular starter as they celebrated winning the 2002–03 Second Division title with 100 points, but struggled to keep his place following promotion to the First Division. Managing just 12 appearances in his first campaign in the higher tier, Mitchell opted for a second loan spell to gain further experience.

In September 2004, Mitchell joined Football League One club Swindon Town on a one-month loan deal. He made his debut in 1–0 win at Colchester United on 4 September and went on to make a further six league appearances. Mitchell's loan deal was initially extended for a further month, but injuries forced him to return to parent club after two weeks. Upon returning to Wigan Athletic, Mitchell made what would become his final appearance for the club in 2–0 win away to Leeds United on 31 October.

In December 2004, Mitchell returned to the Football League One with a loan spell at Milton Keynes Dons. On 11 December, he made his debut in 3–0 win against Wrexham. Mitchell made a further 10 league appearances and a single FA Cup outing before his return to Wigan in March 2005.

=== Milton Keynes Dons ===
In July 2005, Mitchell joined Milton Keynes Dons on a permanent deal following his release from newly promoted Wigan. He became a first team regular and captained the team during the 2006–07 campaign. In January 2007, Mitchell joined league rivals Wrexham on a three-month loan deal after struggling for game time at Milton Keynes. In early February, Mitchell was recalled by his parent club two months early.

On 24 February, Mitchell was stretchered off in a 2–2 draw Notts County. Scans revealed fractures to the tibia, fibula and ankle surfaces which would require 18 months of rehabilitation. He returned to action in a 2–1 defeat to Cardiff City on 26 August 2008, but the match proved to be his final match for the Dons. Later that month, Mitchell signed for Barnet on loan as part of his recovery process. On 30 August, he made his debut during a 5–1 defeat to Chester City. A week later, he completed 90 minutes in a 4–2 defeat to Dagenham & Redbridge in the Football League Trophy. Mitchell made a further two appearances, with his final coming in a 1–1 draw with Morecambe on 13 September.

Mitchell was unable to complete a full recovery from the injury and was forced to announce his retirement on 12 January 2009 at the age of 27. He was immediately offered an ambassadorial role by Milton Keynes Dons and began working with the club's Sport and Education Trust.

== Recruitment career ==
Following Milton Keynes Dons' appointment of Karl Robinson as manager in 2010, the club created a recruitment division and named Mitchell as the club's first Head of Recruitment. He was notably responsible for the signing of former England international Alan Smith.

In January 2012, Mitchell joined Championship club Southampton as Head of Recruitment. The club gained promotion to the Premier League in his first season and Mitchell began working with Mauricio Pochettino following his appointment in January 2013. He oversaw the signings of players including Nathaniel Clyne, Maya Yoshida, Paulo Gazzaniga and Steven Davis.

Following Pochettino's move to Premier League rivals Tottenham Hotspur, Mitchell completed his switch in November 2014 to link up with the manager. He helped the club sign players such as Dele Alli, Son Heung-min, Kieran Trippier and Toby Alderweireld. In August 2016, reports suggested Mitchell was to leave the club "after his dream job turned into a nightmare" and he had fallen out with chairman Daniel Levy. In December, it was revealed Mitchell was serving his 16-month notice period.

In February 2018, Mitchell was named Head of Recruitment and Development by Bundesliga club RB Leipzig. In his first transfer window with the club, Mitchell helped sign Matheus Cunha and Nordi Mukiele, as well as Arsenal youth prospect Emile Smith Rowe on loan. Mitchell attracted interest from several Premier League clubs throughout 2019 and was heavily linked to a move to Manchester United. Reports suggested he could be offered an expanded role as Technical Director to oversee Red Bull's global football – including FC Liefering, Red Bull Salzburg and the New York Red Bulls

In June 2020, Mitchell joined Monaco as sporting director. In July 2024, he was appointed as sporting director at Newcastle United. On 27 May 2025, it was announced that Mitchell would leave the club by mutual consent at the end of June 2025.

== Career statistics ==
Appearances and goals by club, season and competition
Club	Season	League			FA Cup		League Cup		Other		Total	
Club	Season	Division	Apps	Goals	Apps	Goals	Apps	Goals	Apps	Goals	Apps	Goals
Wigan Athletic	2000–01	Second Division	1	0	1	0	2	0	1	0	5	0
Wigan Athletic	2001–02	Second Division	23	0	0	0	1	0	1	0	25	0
Wigan Athletic	2002–03	Second Division	27	0	2	0	3	0	2	0	34	0
Wigan Athletic	2003–04	First Division	12	0	1	0	1	0	0	0	14	0
Wigan Athletic	2004–05	Championship	1	0	0	0	1	0	0	0	2	0
Wigan Athletic	Total		64	0	4	0	8	0	4	0	80	0
Halifax Town (loan)	2001–02	Third Division	11	0	0	0	0	0	0	0	11	0
Swindon Town (loan)	2004–05	League One	7	0	0	0	0	0	0	0	7	0
Milton Keynes Dons (loan)	2004–05	League One	13	0	1	0	0	0	0	0	14	0
Milton Keynes Dons	2005–06	League One	39	0	4	0	0	0	0	0	43	0
Milton Keynes Dons	2006–07	League Two	20	0	1	0	2	0	1	0	24	0
Milton Keynes Dons	2007–08	League Two	0	0	0	0	0	0	0	0	0	0
Milton Keynes Dons	2008–09	League One	0	0	0	0	1	0	0	0	1	0
Milton Keynes Dons	Total		59	0	5	0	3	0	1	0	68	0
Wrexham (loan)	2007–08	League Two	5	0	0	0	0	0	0	0	5	0
Barnet (loan)	2008–09	League Two	3	0	0	0	0	0	1	0	4	0
Career total			162	0	10	0	11	0	6	0	189	0

== Honours ==
Wigan Athletic

- Football League Second Division: 2002–03
