= Gary Smith (footballer, born 1984) =

English footballer (born 1984)

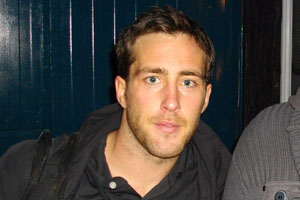
- Smith in 2011

Personal information
- Full name: Gary Stephen Smith
- Date of birth: 30 January 1984 (age 42)
- Place of birth: Middlesbrough, England
- Height: 5 ft 8 in (1.73 m)
- Position: Midfielder

Youth career
- 1999–2003: Middlesbrough

Senior career*
Years	Team	Apps	(Gls)
2003–2004	Middlesbrough	0	(0)
2004	→ Wimbledon (loan)	11	(3)
2004–2007	Milton Keynes Dons	71	(5)
2007–2009	Brentford	33	(1)
2009–2011	Darlington	71	(2)
–2012	Brotton Railway Arms		
Total		186	(11)
- * Club domestic league appearances and goals

Gary Stephen Smith (born 30 January 1984) is an English retired professional footballer who played in the Football League for Milton Keynes Dons, Brentford and Darlington as a midfielder.

== Career ==
=== Middlesbrough ===
A midfielder, Smith began his career in the academy at hometown Premier League club Middlesbrough and signed his first professional contract in July 2002. While a reserve team player, Smith admitted liability for breaking the leg of Manchester United midfielder Ben Collett, who was eventually forced to retire from football due to the tackle. Smith failed to win a call into the first team squad before being released at the end of the 2003–04 season.

=== Milton Keynes Dons ===
On 23 March 2004, Smith joined Milton Keynes-based First Division strugglers Wimbledon on loan until the end of the 2003–04 season. The following day, he made the first senior appearance of his career as a 37th-minute substitute for Albert Jarrett in a 1–0 defeat to Millwall. Smith scored the first senior goal of his career in the following match, with what proved to be a consolation in a 2–1 defeat to Ipswich Town. He finished the season with 11 appearances and three goals, but despite suffering relegation to League One, Smith signed a three-year contract with the club (now renamed Milton Keynes Dons) on a free transfer in May 2004.

Over the course of the 2004–05, 2005–06 and 2006–07 seasons and despite being a popular player, Smith found himself in and out of the team and was out of favour with new manager Martin Allen after the Dons' relegation to League Two in 2006. He played no part in the Dons' 2007 Football League play-off campaign, in which the club's hopes of a return to League One were ended in the semi-finals by Shrewsbury Town. Smith was released in May 2007, having made 91 appearances and scored 12 goals in just over three seasons for Wimbledon and Milton Keynes Dons.

=== Brentford ===
On 1 August 2007, Smith signed a one-year contract with newly relegated League Two club Brentford on a free transfer. He found it difficult to settle in a turbulent time under new manager Terry Butcher, but after Butcher's sacking in December 2007, his assistant Andy Scott took over and Smith finished the season ever-present in the team. He signed a new 18-month contract in January 2008. He finished the 2007–08 season with 32 appearances and 1 goal, which came with a low-drilled shot in a 2–1 victory over Chesterfield on 12 January 2008.

An ankle injury reduced Smith to just four appearances during the 2008–09 season, which was not enough for him to claim a medal as Brentford sealed a return to League One after winning the League Two championship. He was released in May 2009, having made just 36 appearances and scored one goal in two seasons at Griffin Park.

=== Darlington ===
Smith remained in League Two to join Darlington on a free transfer on 1 July 2009. He made 38 appearances and scored one goal in a disastrous season for the Quakers, which resulted in relegation to the Conference Premier, but he signed a new contract to remain with the club. Despite suffering from niggling thigh, knee and ankle injuries, Smith had a good 2010–11 season, scoring five goals in 45 appearances and helping the club to a 7th-place finish and the FA Trophy Final. Despite victory versus Mansfield Town at Wembley Stadium, Smith suffered an injury to his cruciate and medial ligaments on 39 minutes and was substituted for Aman Verma. The club was unable to offer a new contract and he was released at the end of the 2010–11 season, having made 83 appearances and scored 6 goals during two seasons at the Darlington Arena.

== Career statistics ==
Appearances and goals by club, season and competition
Club	Season	League			FA Cup		League Cup		Other		Total	
Club	Season	Division	Apps	Goals	Apps	Goals	Apps	Goals	Apps	Goals	Apps	Goals
Wimbledon (loan)	2003–04	First Division	11	3	—		—		—		11	3
Milton Keynes Dons	2004–05	League One	23	1	3	0	1	0	1 (Note: Appearances in Football League Trophy)	0	28	1
Milton Keynes Dons	2005–06	League One	25	3	2	1	0	0	2	3	29	7
Milton Keynes Dons	2006–07	League Two	23	1	0	0	0	0	0	0	23	1
Milton Keynes Dons	Wimbledon/MK Dons total		82	8	5	1	1	0	3	3	91	12
Brentford	2007–08	League Two	29	1	1	0	1	0	1	0	32	1
Brentford	2008–09	League Two	4	0	0	0	0	0	0	0	4	0
Brentford	Total		33	1	1	0	1	0	1	0	36	1
Darlington	2009–10	League Two	34	1	1	0	1	0	2	0	38	1
Darlington	2010–11	Conference Premier	37	1	2	2	—		7 (Note: Appearances in FA Trophy. For appearance omitted by Soccerway:)	2	46	5
Darlington	Total		71	2	3	2	1	0	9	2	84	6
Career total			186	11	9	3	3	0	13	5	211	19

== Honours ==
Darlington

- FA Trophy: 2010–11
