= Lionel Morgan (footballer) =

English footballer (born 1983)

Personal information
- Full name: Lionel Anthony Morgan
- Date of birth: 17 February 1983 (age 43)
- Place of birth: London Borough of Enfield, England
- Height: 6 ft 1 in (1.85 m)
- Position: Winger

Youth career
- 1993–2000: Wimbledon

Senior career*
| Years | Team | Apps | (Gls) |
| 2000–2004 | Wimbledon | 30 | (2) |

International career
| 2001–2002 | England U19 | 3 | (1) |
| 2002–2003 | England U20 | 2 | (0) |
- * Club domestic league appearances and goals

Lionel Anthony Morgan (born 17 February 1983) is an English former footballer who played as a winger for Wimbledon before injury forced him to retire from the game at the age of just 21. He made an appearance for England under-19s in a televised game in which he received the man of the match award, and was compared by studio analysts to a young John Barnes.

== Playing career ==
Morgan was born in the London Borough of Enfield and grew up in Tottenham. As a youngster he played for Broadwater United F.C., a community club on the Broadwater Farm Estate. He joined Wimbledon's youth system at the age of 10, and went on to represent England at under-16 level. He scored a goal on his full debut for Wimbledon's reserve team aged only 16, and impressed on his next appearance.

His first-team debut came on 26 August 2000 in a goalless draw against Watford; the 17-year-old set up a chance from which John Hartson headed against the goalkeeper. He played three more first-team games before breaking his ankle in an under-19 game. He played twice more for the first team at the end of the 2000–01 Football League season, then surgery to knee cartilage damaged in a pre-season friendly caused him to miss the first two months of the 2001–02 season. He made an impressive return to the reserves, and in November 2001 played for England under-19s in a European Championship qualifier against their Georgian counterparts. The match, a 4–1 win, was televised, and Morgan was named by Sky Sports' Nigel Spackman as man of the match.

He returned to first-team action as a substitute at the end of January 2002. In February, Tottenham Hotspur made an offer of £750,000 for Morgan's services. Manager Terry Burton was unwilling to sell, but the club's reported £20,000-a-day losses prompted chairman Charles Koppel to consider the offer. Koppel was later insistent that Morgan would only leave "at the right price" and the player confirmed he was happy at the club. Meanwhile, Morgan scored for England under-19s in a friendly against Germany, and speculation in the press was that Wimbledon would not reach the play-offs unless Morgan was part of the starting eleven. In March he scored his first senior goal, the only goal of the game against Rotherham United, from a free kick described by assistant manager Stuart Murdoch as "Beckham-esque". A few days later he damaged his cruciate ligament against Crewe Alexandra, an injury which required two operations and kept him out of first-team action for seven months.

After scoring in his first league start of the season, he received a call-up to represent England under-20s, and played the whole of a 2–0 defeat to Switzerland. In his third game back in first-team action after a knee cartilage operation in January 2003, he was forced out of the game with a bruised and lacerated ankle resulting from a foul tackle by Portsmouth's Tim Sherwood; manager Murdoch accused the player of singling Morgan out for rough treatment. In April he underwent further surgery on his knee cartilage.

In June 2003, Wimbledon F.C. went into administration; Morgan's proposed transfer to Tottenham, for a fee of £400,000, fell through when he failed the medical, although it was reported that the deal could proceed once the player proved his fitness. His next first-team comeback, in September, lasted just three games before a training-ground knock aggravated the knee problem and two more operations ensued, though the prognosis was hopeful. However, the player's contract was due to expire at the end of the 2003–04 season, and the club chose not to renew it. Manager Murdoch said Morgan was attempting to regain fitness in time for pre-season training so that he could find another club, but he did not play professionally again.

== After playing ==
Morgan was for a time reserve team manager of Wingate & Finchley, and had a brief involvement with managing the first team in the Isthmian League. In 2008, Morgan was coaching at the Broadwater United football project alongside former teammate Jude Stirling, son of the programme's founder Clasford Stirling. Morgan and former teammate Jobi McAnuff formed a management company, Infinite Sports Management, in 2011. The company was dissolved in 2017. He now works at a school.

== Career statistics ==
Appearances and goals by club, season and competition
| Club | Season | League | | | FA Cup | | League Cup | | Total | |
| Club | Season | Division | Apps | Goals | Apps | Goals | Apps | Goals | Apps | Goals |
|---|---|---|---|---|---|---|---|---|---|---|
| Wimbledon | 2000–01 | First Division | 5 | 0 | 0 | 0 | 1 | 0 | 6 | 0 |
| Wimbledon | 2001–02 | First Division | 11 | 1 | 0 | 0 | 0 | 0 | 11 | 1 |
| Wimbledon | 2002–03 | First Division | 11 | 1 | 1 | 1 | 1 | 0 | 13 | 2 |
| Wimbledon | 2003–04 | First Division | 3 | 0 | 0 | 0 | 0 | 0 | 3 | 0 |
| Career total | | | 30 | 2 | 1 | 1 | 2 | 0 | 33 | 3 |
