= Michel Pensée =

Cameroonian footballer (born 1973)

Personal information
- Full name: Michel Pensée Billong
- Date of birth: 16 June 1973 (age 53)
- Place of birth: Yaoundé, Cameroon
- Height: 1.93 m (6 ft 4 in)
- Position: Defender

Senior career*
Years	Team	Apps	(Gls)
1988–1994	Tonnerre Yaoundé		
1994–1997	Jaibos Tampico Madero		
1997–1999	Cheonan Ilhwa Chunma	50	(2)
2000–2001	Aves	5	(0)
2001	Anzhi Makhachkala	20	(1)
2002	Sanfrecce Hiroshima	25	(0)
2005	Milton Keynes Dons	18	(1)

International career
1997–2001	Cameroon	7	(0)
Medal record
Representing Cameroon
Africa Cup of Nations
Winner	2000 Ghana-Nigeria
- * Club domestic league appearances and goals

Michel Pensée Billong (born 16 June 1973 in Yaoundé) is a Cameroonian former professional footballer who played as a defender. He enjoyed a geographically varied career which took in spells with teams in his native Cameroon, Mexico, South Korea, Portugal, Russia, Japan and England. In England he scored once for MK Dons against Barnsley. He was a part of the Cameroonian 1998 FIFA World Cup side.

== Club career ==
In January 2005, Pensée signed for Milton Keynes Dons on a contract until the end of the season.

== Career statistics ==
=== Club ===
Appearances and goals by club, season and competition
Club	Season	League			National cup		League cup		Continental		Total	
Club	Season	Division	Apps	Goals	Apps	Goals	Apps	Goals	Apps	Goals		
Cheonan Ilhwa Chunma	1997	K League 1	3	1							3	1
Cheonan Ilhwa Chunma	1998	K League 1	15	1							15	1
Cheonan Ilhwa Chunma	1999	K League 1	32	0							32	0
Cheonan Ilhwa Chunma	Total		50	2							50	2
Aves	2000–01	Primeira Liga	5	0							5	0
Anzhi Makhachkala	2001	Top Division	20	0	4	1	–		1	0	25	1
Sanfrecce Hiroshima	2002	J1 League	25	0	0	0	6	0	–		25	0
Milton Keynes Dons	2004–05	League One	18	1	0	0	0	0	–		18	1
Career total			118	4	4	1	0	0	1	0	18	1

=== International ===
Appearances and goals by national team and year
National team	Year	Apps	Goals
Cameroon	1997	2	0
Cameroon	1998	2	0
Cameroon	1999	1	0
Cameroon	2000	1	0
Cameroon	2001	1	0
Cameroon	Total	7	0

== Honours ==
Cameroon

- African Cup of Nations: 2000
