= Serge Makofo =

Congolese professional footballer (born 1986)

Personal information
- Date of birth: 3 September 1986 (age 40)
- Place of birth: Kinshasa, Zaire
- Height: 5 ft 11 in (1.80 m)
- Positions: Midfielder; striker

Senior career*
Years	Team	Apps	(Gls)
2004–2006	Milton Keynes Dons	1	(0)
2006–2007	Kettering Town	20	(1)
2007–2008	Maidenhead United	17	(0)
2008	Halesowen Town	2	(0)
2008	Potters Bar Town	4	(1)
2008–2009	Croydon Athletic	14	(2)
2009–2010	Grays Athletic	1	(0)
2009	→ Burton Albion (loan)	2	(0)
2010–2011	Kettering Town	23	(2)
2011–2012	Grimsby Town	28	(4)
2012–2013	Farnborough	2	(1)
2013	Concord Rangers	5	(2)
2013	Havant & Waterlooville	0	(0)
2013–2014	PAEEK	11	(0)
2014	Gresley	7	(3)
2014–2015	Whitehawk	19	(0)
2015	→ Dulwich Hamlet (loan)	5	(2)
2016–2017	Tooting & Mitcham United	7	(2)
2017	Edinburgh City	1	(0)
2019–2020	Caledonian Braves		
2021–2022	Merstham	34	(2)
2023	Bowers & Pitsea	2	(0)
- * Club domestic league appearances and goals as of 21:13, 5 April 2024 (UTC)

Serge Makofo (born 3 September 1986) is a Congolese professional footballer, who plays as a midfielder and striker.

He has previously played for Milton Keynes Dons, Kettering Town, Maidenhead United, Halesowen Town, Potters Bar Town, Croydon Athletic, Grays Athletic, Burton Albion, Grimsby Town, Farnborough, Concord Rangers, Havant & Waterlooville, PAEEK and Gresley.

== Career ==
=== Milton Keynes Dons ===
Makofo made his debut for Milton Keynes Dons on 2 November 2004 in 2–1 defeat in the southern section second round of the Football League Trophy against Bristol City, he came on as a substitute for Malvin Kamara in the 64th minute and scored two minutes later in the 66th minute. He made his first and only appearance in the Football League just four days later on 6 November, against Bristol City again in the 4–1 League One defeat, he came on as a substitute in the 66th minute for Alex Tapp. Makofo gained something of a cult following during his time with MK Dons thanks to the computer game Championship Manager 4, in which the youngster was one of the 'must sign' players. In the game Makofo could be bought early on for a pittance and would almost always become a world beater, despite the fact that the game had no official position for him which led some to speculate whether the young prodigy was even a real player.

=== Kettering Town, Maidenhead United and Halesowen Town ===
Following his release from MK Dons in 2006, Makofo signed for non-League club Kettering Town in March. He was released from Kettering in May 2007 along with six other players. He joined Maidenhead United in August 2007, before signing for Halesowen Town on 7 March 2008.

=== Potters Bar Town and Croydon Athletic ===
Later in March, he had an unsuccessful trial with Dorchester Town. He went on to join Potters Bar Town and then Croydon Athletic in December 2008. During the 2008–09 season with Croydon, Makofo was a runner-up in the London Senior Cup, the score was 2–2 after extra time. Croydon were defeated by Hendon 3–1 on penalties, Makofo was the only player for Croydon to score as Sam Clayton, Shabazz Baidoo and Robbie Ryan all missed.

=== Grays Athletic ===
Makofo signed for Grays Athletic on 26 June 2009, along with Marcel McKie, Nick McKoy and Allan McLeod. He was released from Grays on 31 August, with four other players after making just one substitute appearance. In September, Makofo joined Burton Albion on trial and scored a hat-trick in Burton's 6–0 reserves fixture against Macclesfield Town. Burton manager Paul Peschisolido said; "I like what I've seen of Serge and it's hard to ignore someone who can score a hat-trick". Makofo signed a short-term deal with Burton on 25 September. Registration problems meant that he had to sign on loan from previous club, Grays Athletic.

In July 2010 he underwent a trial at League Two club Gillingham. The club's manager Andy Hessenthaler stated he was impressed with Makofo, but ultimately was unable to offer him a contract.

=== Return to Kettering Town ===
Makofo then rejoined former club Kettering Town in the Conference National.

Following his performance during Kettering's win over York City in October, player-coach Paul Furlong commented that "Gareth Bale is the same sort of player as Serge. He pushes the ball on and works the full-back. Serge has got a run in the team and that brings confidence."

=== Grimsby Town ===
On 18 January 2011, he signed for Grimsby Town on a three-year contract. Manager Neil Woods was dismissed early on into Makofo's Town career, and on 18 April 2011 the player was told he had no future at the club by the new managerial duo of Rob Scott and Paul Hurst. Grimsby chairman John Fenty said on 16 May that the signing of Makofo had been a "disaster", and that he had recently been on trial with Lincoln City after being told he was surplus to requirements.

Makofo was given an opportunity to regain a first team place in the summer of 2011, and his pre-season performances earned him a place back in the squad, but after suffering a foot injury in mid season, Makofo struggled to break back into the team and saw out the 2011–12 season struggling to break on to the substitute bench. On 12 May 2012, and for the second season running Makofo was told by Scott and Hurst that he was not in the management duo's plans, with this Grimsby began to work on a settlement agreement with the player to terminate his contract. On 2 July 2012, Makofo left Grimsby Town by mutual consent.

=== Farnborough and Concord Rangers ===
On 14 July 2012, he joined Ebbsfleet United on trial and came off the bench to score in a 6–1 away win in a friendly fixture with Tonbridge Angels. He also played in Fleet's friendly with Leyton Orient but was released along with fellow trialists Ashley Winn and Kirk Hudson.

On 29 August 2012, Makofo joined Conference South side Farnborough. On 8 March 2013 Makofo signed for Concord Rangers.

=== Havant & Waterlooville and PAEEK ===
In July 2013, Makofo joined Havant & Waterlooville. Shortly afterwards he signed a contract for Cypriot Second Division side PAEEK and later moved to Gresley.

=== Gresley ===
Makofo made his Gresley debut on 22 March 2014 as a 60th-minute substitute. Makofo went on to start the next six games until the end of the season. He managed to score three goals in the six starts and one substitute appearances he made. Makofo did not sign on for the 2014–15 season.

=== Whitehawk ===
On 25 July 2014, Makofo joined Whitehawk, going on to make 24 appearances and scoring once. Towards the end of January 2015 Makofo joined Dulwich Hamlet on loan, with the signing being funded by the Dulwich Hamlet 12th Man scheme. He scored his first goal for the club with the only goal of the game on his debut against Enfield on 28 January 2015, earning praise from manager Gavin Rose in the process. He went on to make five appearances in total, scoring one further goal during his month long loan spell.

=== Merstham ===
In September 2021, Makofo signed for Merstham, scoring on his debut in the FA Cup.

=== Bowers & Pitsea ===
In August 2023, Makofo joined Bowers & Pitsea.

== Honours ==
Croydon Athletic

- London Senior Cup: Runner-up, 2008–09

Grimsby Town

- Lincolnshire Senior Cup: Winner, 2011–12
