= Scott Bevan =

English footballer (born 1979)

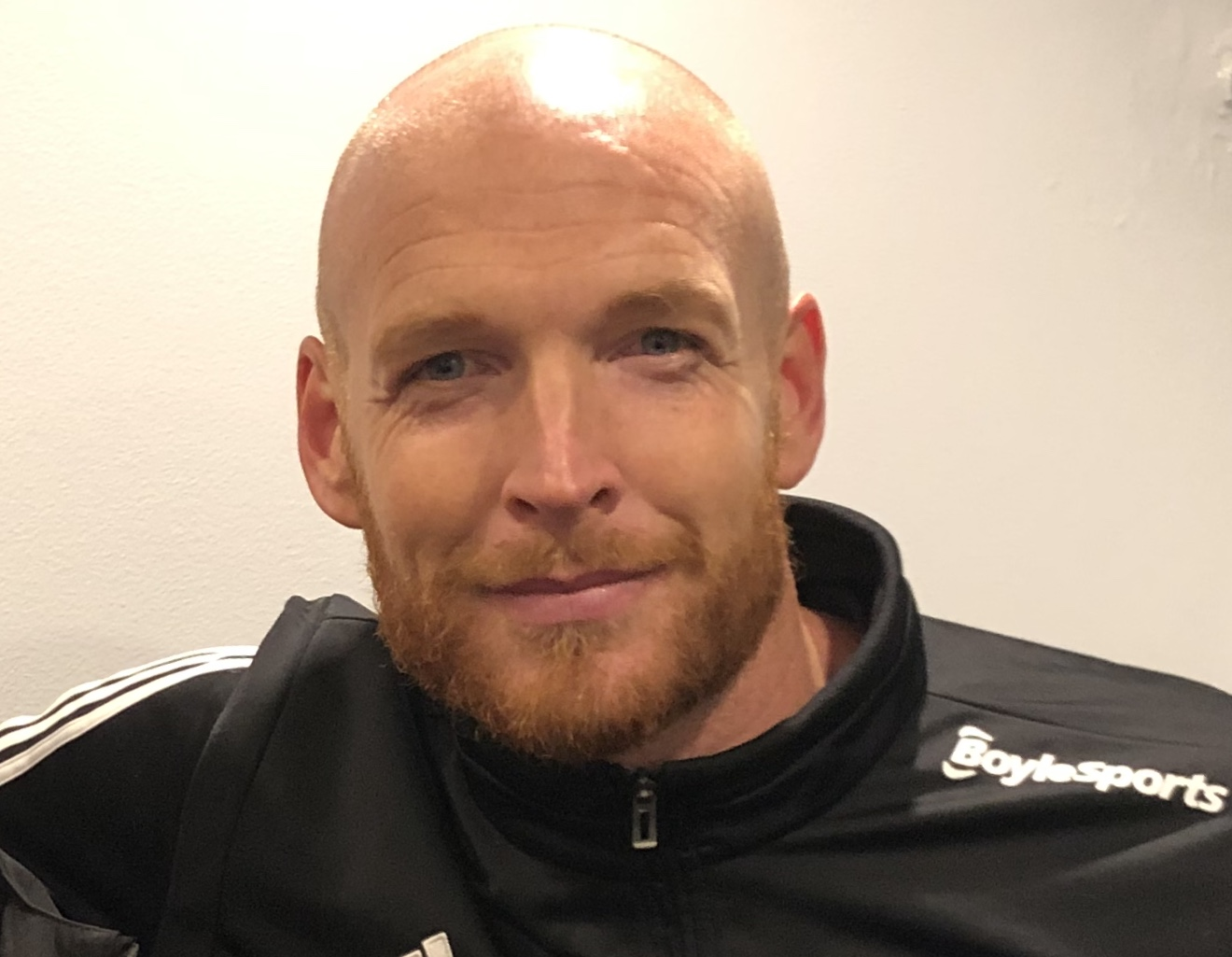

Personal information
- Full name: Scott Anthony Bevan
- Date of birth: 19 September 1979 (age 47)
- Place of birth: Southampton, England
- Height: 6 ft 7 in (2.01 m)
- Position: Goalkeeper

Team information
- Current team: Wolverhampton Wanderers (under-21s goalkeeping coach)

Youth career
- 1996–1997: Southampton

Senior career*
Years	Team	Apps	(Gls)
1997–2004	Southampton	0	(0)
1999	→ Ayr United (loan)	0	(0)
2002	→ Stoke City (loan)	0	(0)
2002	→ Woking (loan)	7	(0)
2002–2003	→ Huddersfield Town (loan)	30	(0)
2003	→ Woking (loan)	4	(0)
2004	→ Wycombe Wanderers (loan)	5	(0)
2004	Wimbledon	10	(0)
2004–2006	Milton Keynes Dons	7	(0)
2005–2006	→ Tamworth (loan)	10	(0)
2006–2008	Kidderminster Harriers	57	(0)
2008	Shrewsbury Town	5	(0)
2008–2011	Torquay United	89	(0)
2011–2013	Bristol Rovers	37	(0)
2013–2014	Havant & Waterlooville	18	(0)
Total		279	(0)
- * Club domestic league appearances and goals

Scott Anthony Bevan (born 19 September 1979) is a former professional footballer currently employed as the under-21s goalkeeping coach at Wolverhampton Wanderers.

== Career ==
=== Playing career ===
Bevan started his football career with Southampton as an associated schoolboy player before turning professional in 1997. He never made a first team appearance for Southampton although he did get experience out on loan at Ayr United, Stoke City, Woking (on two separate occasions), Huddersfield Town and Wycombe Wanderers.

In March 2004, Bevan joined Wimbledon (renamed as Milton Keynes Dons at the end of the 2003–04 season) and went on make 19 appearances over two seasons. Out of favour at the start of the 2005–06 season, he trained with Scarborough with a view to a possible loan move in October 2005. However, later that month he joined Conference National side Tamworth on loan. He put in memorable performances in Tamworth's FA Cup run whilst on-loan with The Lambs, which included victories over league sides AFC Bournemouth and Hartlepool United and two ties against Stoke City in the third round. As interest from several League clubs for his signature mounted, his career and life were turned upside down after he sustained a serious kidney injury in a league fixture at Forest Green Rovers in January 2006. After undergoing an operation to remove a kidney that left many thinking he might never play competitive football again, Bevan showed remarkable recovery and resilience to once again make himself available.

Bevan was signed by Kidderminster Harriers in August 2006, despite Tamworth's interest in the talented goalkeeper.

In January 2008, and after 18 successful months at Aggborough, Bevan helped Kidderminster reach the 2007 FA Trophy Final against Stevenage, thus playing in the first ever competitive game at the new Wembley Stadium in front of 53262 fans. Bevan was signed by Shrewsbury for an undisclosed fee, in a deal that saw Chris Mackenzie move in the opposite direction.

In September 2008, Bevan joined Torquay United loan as cover for their injured first choice keeper Michael Poke, himself on loan from Southampton. For the second time in his career he helped a non-league side reach the third round of the FA Cup. He signed an 18-month contract with Torquay on 28 December 2008.

On 6 June 2011, Bevan followed manager Paul Buckle to recently relegated League Two side Bristol Rovers. He made his Rovers debut on the opening day of the Football League season, against AFC Wimbledon.

=== Coaching career ===
On 4 July 2018, Bevan was announced as Birmingham City's Under-23s goalkeeping coach, the first time the club had appointed a goalkeeping coach solely dedicated to the under-23s. At the start of the 2020–21 season, he acted as first-team goalkeeper coach until Tony Roberts was appointed in October.

In June 2022, Bevan was appointed by Philippines national team to be their goalkeeping coach in the third round of 2023 Asian Cup Qualifiers.

In December 2022, he joined Wolverhampton Wanderers as the under-21s goalkeeping coach and head of the club's academy goalkeeping development.

== Career statistics ==
Appearances and goals by club, season and competition
Club	Season	League			FA Cup		League Cup		Other		Total	
Club	Season	Division	Apps	Goals	Apps	Goals	Apps	Goals	Apps	Goals	Apps	Goals
Southampton	1999–2000	Premier League	0	0	0	0	0	0	0	0	0	0
Southampton	2000–01	Premier League	0	0	0	0	0	0	0	0	0	0
Southampton	2001–02	Premier League	0	0	0	0	0	0	0	0	0	0
Southampton	2002–03	Premier League	0	0	0	0	0	0	0	0	0	0
Southampton	2003–04	Premier League	0	0	0	0	0	0	0	0	0	0
Southampton	Total		0	0	0	0	0	0	0	0	0	0
Ayr United (loan)	1999–2000	Scottish First Division	0	0	0	0	0	0	0	0	0	0
Stoke City (loan)	2001–02	Second Division	0	0	0	0	0	0	0	0	0	0
Woking (loan)	2001–02	Football Conference	7	0	0	0	0	0	0	0	7	0
Huddersfield Town (loan)	2002–03	Second Division	30	0	1	0	2	0	1	0	34	0
Woking (loan)	2003–04	Football Conference	4	0	1	0	0	0	0	0	5	0
Wycombe Wanderers (loan)	2003–04	Second Division	5	0	0	0	0	0	0	0	5	0
Wimbledon	2003–04	First Division	10	0	0	0	0	0	0	0	10	0
Milton Keynes Dons	2004–05	League One	7	0	0	0	1	0	1	0	9	0
Tamworth (loan)	2005–06	Football Conference	10	0	4	0	0	0	0	0	14	0
Kidderminster Harriers	2006–07	Football Conference	40	0	1	0	0	0	4	0	45	0
Kidderminster Harriers	2007–08	Football Conference	17	0	1	0	0	0	1	0	19	0
Kidderminster Harriers	Total		57	0	2	0	0	0	5	0	64	0
Shrewsbury Town	2007–08	League Two	5	0	0	0	0	0	0	0	5	0
Torquay United	2008–09	Football Conference	34	0	4	0	0	0	1	0	39	0
Torquay United	2009–10	League Two	18	0	2	0	1	0	2	0	23	0
Torquay United	2010–11	League Two	37	0	4	0	1	0	4	0	46	0
Torquay United	Total		89	0	10	0	2	0	7	0	108	0
Bristol Rovers	2011–12	League Two	37	0	2	0	2	0	1	0	42	0
Bristol Rovers	2012–13	League Two	0	0	0	0	0	0	0	0	0	0
Bristol Rovers	Total		37	0	2	0	2	0	1	0	41	0
Havant & Waterlooville	2013–14	Conference South	18	0	0	0	0	0	0	0	18	0
Career total			279	0	20	0	7	0	15	0	321	0
