= David Moore (footballer, born 1985) =

English footballer

Personal information
- Date of birth: 4 April 1985 (age 41)
- Place of birth: Salford, England
- Position: Striker

Senior career*
Years	Team	Apps	(Gls)
2001–2005	Wigan Athletic	0	(0)
2004	→ Stalybridge Celtic (loan)	4	(0)
2005	→ Bury (loan)	3	(0)
2005	Hyde United	2	(0)
2006	Curzon Ashton		
2006–2007	Ashton United		
2007	Chorley		
2007–2008	Flixton		
- * Club domestic league appearances and goals

David Moore (born 4 April 1985 in Salford, Greater Manchester) is an English former football striker.

He made his first and only appearance for Wigan Athletic in August 2001 in a Football League Cup match against Blackpool. He was loaned out to Stalybridge Celtic in 2004, making four appearances, and then Bury in 2005, where he made three league appearances as a substitute, before being released at the end of the season.

He was signed by Hyde United, where he made two appearances. He then went on to play for Curzon Ashton and Ashton United before signing for Chorley in March 2007. He left the club in September 2007 and signed with Flixton.
