= Mirano Carrilho =

Dutch footballer

Personal information
- Full name: Mirano Carrilho
- Date of birth: 17 July 1975 (age 51)
- Place of birth: Amsterdam, Netherlands
- Height: 1.78 m (5 ft 10 in)
- Position: Left back

Senior career*
Years	Team	Apps	(Gls)
1995–2000	Haarlem	90	(1)
2000–2001	RW Essen	21	(1)
2001–2004	ADO Den Haag	58	(0)
2004–2005	De Graafschap	9	(0)
2005	FC Dordrecht	10	(1)
2005	MK Dons	3	(0)
2006–2008	AGOVV	55	(0)
Total		246	(3)
- * Club domestic league appearances and goals

Mirano Carrilho (born 19 July 1975) is a retired football player, who moved from FC Dordrecht to MK Dons in 2005 on a short-term deal after a trial period.

== Club career ==
Before joining MK Dons on a half-year contract in summer 2005, the full-back/winger made 187 appearances and scored 3 goals for previous clubs which include FC Dordrecht, De Graafschap and ADO Den Haag.

In January 2006 he returned to Holland to play for AGOVV, where he suddenly retired in March 2008 after it became clear his 1-year-old daughter had fallen seriously ill.
