= Julien Hornuss =

French footballer (born 1986)

Personal information
- Full name: Julien Hornuss
- Date of birth: 12 June 1986 (age 40)
- Place of birth: Paris, France
- Height: 1.81 m (5 ft 11 in)
- Position: Striker

Team information
- Current team: Fola Esch

Youth career
- 1999–2004: Auxerre

Senior career*
| Years | Team | Apps | (Gls) |
| 2004–2006 | Milton Keynes Dons | 5 | (0) |
| 2006–2007 | UE Lleida | 0 | (0) |
| 2006–2007 | → Eivissa (loan) | 20 | (10) |
| 2007 | → Villarreal B (loan) | 6 | (2) |
| 2007–2009 | Eivissa | 25 | (5) |
| 2009 | CD Guijuelo | 7 | (1) |
| 2009–2010 | Palamós CF | 29 | (21) |
| 2010– | Fola Esch | 132 | (35) |
- * Club domestic league appearances and goals as of 3 June 2016

Julien Hornuss, a.k.a. Julien, (born 12 June 1986) is a French footballer who currently plays for Fola Esch of the Luxembourgian first division's BGL League. He plays as a striker.

== Career ==
Hornuss was signed by manager Stuart Murdoch for English club Milton Keynes Dons in the summer of 2004, and made five appearances for the club in the 2004–05 season. He did not feature in the first team in the 2005–06 season, despite scoring prolifically for the reserve side, and held talks with manager Danny Wilson in October 2005 to clarify his future at the club. In January 2006, he went to a Spanish third division club for a two-game trial, and was released by Milton Keynes Dons in February 2006 so he could find another club. He joined UE Lleida and also played for Eivissa, Villarreal B, and CD Guijuelo.

In September 2009, he signed for Palamós CF, from the Spanish Third Division, fifth group (Catalan one). He made a spectacular start to the competition, scoring 18 goals in the first 15 games.
