= Harry Ntimban-Zeh =

French footballer (born 1973)

Personal information
- Full name: Harry Dave Ntimban-Zeh
- Date of birth: 26 September 1973 (age 53)
- Place of birth: Paris, France
- Height: 1.85 m (6 ft 1 in)
- Position: Defender

Youth career
- 1981-1987: Racing Club de Paris
- 1987-1989: Matra Racing
- 1989-1991: Racing Paris 1

Senior career*
Years	Team	Apps	(Gls)
1991–1994	Boulogne	55	(1)
1994–1997	Calais	85	(3)
1997–1999	Boulogne	44	(1)
1999–2001	Dijon	69	(1)
2001–2004	Espinho	?	(?)
2004	Wimbledon	10	(0)
2004–2005	Milton Keynes Dons	11	(0)
- * Club domestic league appearances and goals

Harry Dave Ntimban-Zeh (born 26 September 1973) is a French former footballer who played as a defender.

He was signed by Wimbledon from S.C. Espinho in March 2004. He was released by Milton Keynes Dons in July 2005.
