= Matt Baker (footballer, born 1979) =

English football

Personal information
- Date of birth: 18 December 1979 (age 46)
- Place of birth: Harrogate, England
- Position: Goalkeeper

Youth career
- 1994–1996: Leeds United
- 1996–1998: Hull City

Senior career*
Years	Team	Apps	(Gls)
1998–2000	Hull City	2	(0)
2000	→ Bradford Park Avenue (loan)	1	(0)
2000–2004	Hereford United	124	(0)
2004	Wrexham	13	(0)
2004–2006	Milton Keynes Dons	57	(0)
2006–2008	Weymouth	?	(?)
2007	→ Rushden & Diamonds (loan)	6	(0)
Total		204	(0)

International career
2002–2004	England C	6	(0)
- * Club domestic league appearances and goals

Matthew Christopher J. Baker (born 18 December 1979) is an English former footballer who played as a goalkeeper. He stood as a Conservative council candidate in Leeds in 2010 but was not elected.

== Football career ==
Baker comes from Leeds, and played for four years with Leeds City Boys. He was originally on the books of Leeds United as a schoolboy. However, he was signed as an apprentice at Hull City in 1996 and progressed through the youth ranks and turned professional in 1998. However, he suffered an horrendous knee injury which sidelined him for a season, but he eventually made two substitute appearances for the first team. He also made a sub appearance in the League Cup against Liverpool at Anfield, after Lee Bracey was sent off. He was released, after a spell on loan at Bradford Park Avenue, in 2000.

He was snapped up by Hereford United of the Conference, where he was second choice goalkeeper to Scott Cooksey in the 2000–01 season, although he started two league matches conceding a goal in each. However a serious wrist injury forced Cooksey onto the sidelines, and eventually into retirement, meaning Baker started the 2001–02 season as first choice keeper where he impressed. He quickly established himself in the team and played all but five first team matches that season. Most notably he had an inspired Man-of-the-Match performance in the FA Cup against future club Wrexham, a match which was televised live by the BBC, as Hereford won 1–0.

The following season he gained experience training with Aston Villa, and was an ever-present in the first team where he repeated this consistency in the 2003–04 season when Hereford came close to promotion to the Football League, a season which turned out to be his last for Hereford. During this period he also made four appearances for his country by representing the England National Game XI.

In the summer of 2004 he signed for Wrexham. However, he spent only six months at the Racecourse Ground before signing for MK Dons, for whom he quickly became a fans favourite, and helped them survive relegation in his first season, and went on to make over 60 first team appearances. Two years later he signed for Conference side Weymouth on a free transfer. However, due to severe financial troubles, at the Terras, he never made a first team appearance.

On 2 March 2007 he was loaned to Rushden & Diamonds where he finished the season as number 1. On 20 July he joined Macclesfield Town on trial but despite again impressing was forced to retire from the game in August 2007 due to a reoccurrence of a knee injury. Shortly afterwards he became a presenter for Dons World, the Milton Keynes Dons' official web TV station, having started a degree in Sports Journalism & Broadcasting in 2006. He graduated with a degree from Staffordshire University in summer of 2008 and now works as a sports journalist for The Sun newspaper and BBC local radio stations.

== Political career ==
Baker is an active Conservative Party member and a local resident of Weetwood Ward, where he stood to be a Leeds City Councillor in the 2010 local elections but failed. He was also a member of Conservative candidate Julia Mulligan's campaign team in the 2010 General election.
