= Leon Crooks =

English footballer

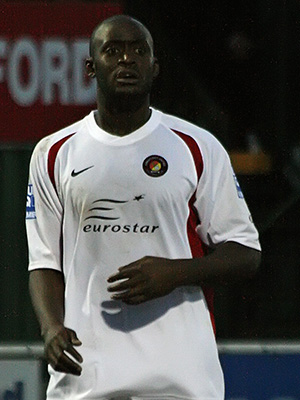

Personal information
- Full name: Leon Everton George Crooks
- Date of birth: 21 November 1985 (age 40)
- Place of birth: Greenwich, England
- Height: 6 ft 1 in (1.85 m)
- Position: Defender

Youth career
- ?–2004: Milton Keynes Dons

Senior career*
Years	Team	Apps	(Gls)
2004–2007	Milton Keynes Dons	52	(0)
2007–2009	Wycombe Wanderers	13	(0)
2009	→ Ebbsfleet United (loan)	15	(0)
2009–2010	Ebbsfleet United	41	(2)
Total		121	(2)
- * Club domestic league appearances and goals

Leon Everton George Crooks (born 21 November 1985) is an English former footballer.

== Career ==
Born in Greenwich, London, Leon Crooks joined Wycombe Wanderers in January 2007 from Milton Keynes Dons for a nominal fee. However, he failed to impress manager Paul Lambert, despite fans' spokesman Luke Taylor describing him as a "sensational talent", and in July 2007 he was left out of a pre-season tour to Germany. He requested to be allowed to train with the Dons while he searched for a new contract at the start of the new season but returned to Wycombe after a week having failed to impress new Dons manager Paul Ince. In January 2009, it was announced that Crooks would join Conference National side Ebbsfleet United on month's loan. Crooks made his debut for Ebbsfleet in their 1–0 home league win over Rushden & Diamonds, and the loan was subsequently extended to two, and then three months.

At the end of the 2008–09 season, Wycombe Wanderers released Crooks.

Crooks signed for Ebbsfleet United permanently on 6 August 2009, but was released in the summer of 2010.
