= Nick Rizzo =

Australian soccer player (born 1979)

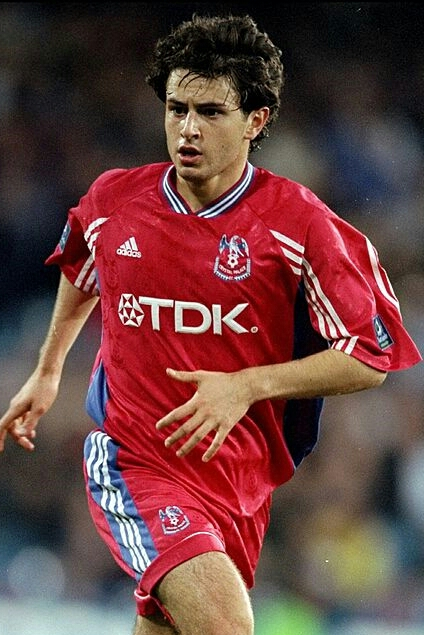
- Rizzo playing for Crystal Palace

Personal information
- Full name: Nicholas Anthony Rizzo
- Date of birth: 9 June 1979 (age 47)
- Place of birth: Sydney, New South Wales, Australia
- Height: 1.78 m (5 ft 10 in)
- Position: Left winger

Youth career
- 1994–1996: Sydney Olympic

Senior career*
Years	Team	Apps	(Gls)
1996–1998	Liverpool	0	(0)
1998–2000	Crystal Palace	68	(8)
2000–2003	Ternana	1	(0)
2001	→ Ancona (loan)	1	(0)
2003–2004	AC Prato	26	(5)
2004–2007	Milton Keynes Dons	50	(4)
2007	→ Grimsby Town (loan)	1	(0)
2007	→ Chesterfield (loan)	4	(0)
2007–2009	Perth Glory	26	(1)
2009	Central Coast Mariners	0	(0)
2009–2013	APIA Leichhardt Tigers	57	(12)
Total		234	(30)

International career^{‡}
1995	Australia U-17	7	(2)
1999	Australia U-20	6	(1)
2000	Australia U-23	9	(4)
1998	Australia	1	(0)
Medal record
Representing Australia
Men's Association football
OFC U-20 Championship
Winner	1998 Samoa
- * Club domestic league appearances and goals as of 10 October 2013 ‡ National team caps and goals as of 19 January 2008

Nicholas Anthony Rizzo (born 9 June 1979) is an Australian former footballer. Rizzo began his career in England with Liverpool, however, he made his professional debut for Crystal Palace, where he featured in Division 1. He then moved to Italy and played with Ternana, AC Ancona and AC Prato before returning to England with Milton Keynes Dons, Grimsby Town and Chesterfield. He has since played in his native land for Perth Glory, Central Coast Mariners and APIA Leichhardt Tigers. He was capped once for Australia.

== Club career ==
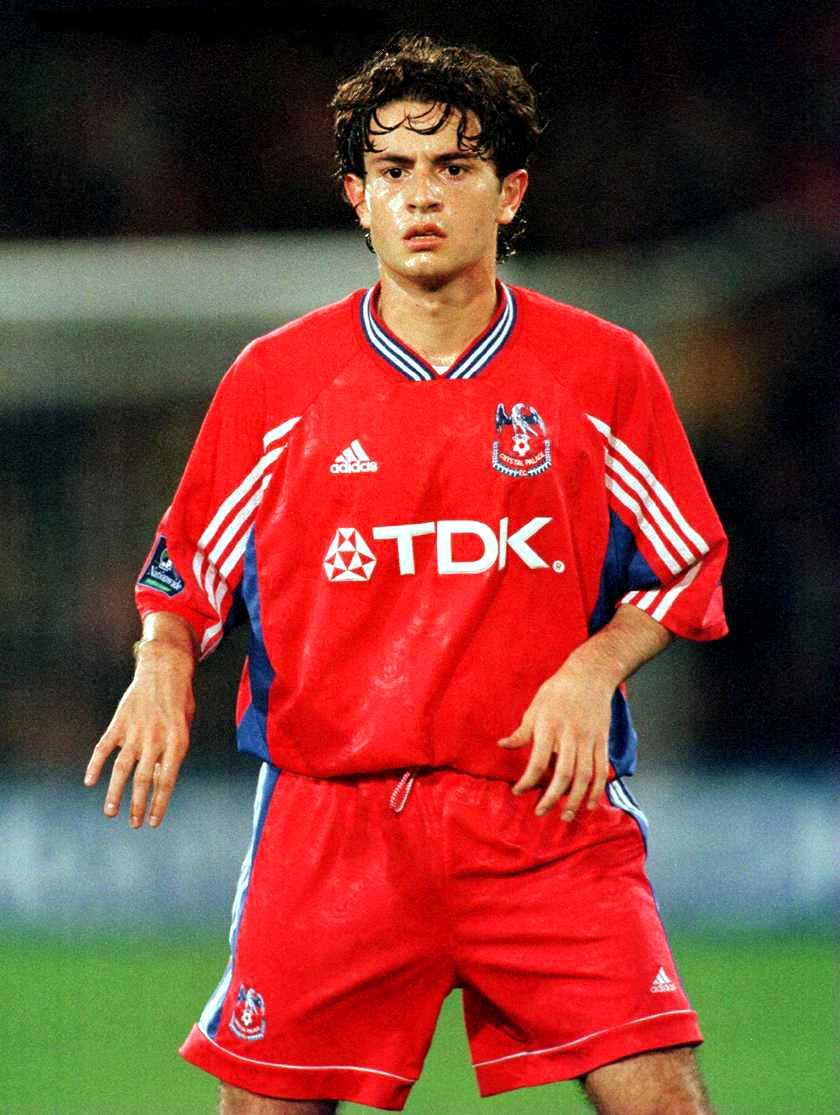
Rizzo playing for Crystal Palace in 1998

After being educated at playing school football at Waverley College in Sydney, Rizzo arrived in England in 1996, joining English giants Liverpool. Although not capped in the first team, the then 18-year-old was an unused substitute on four occasions in the Premier League season 1997/98. He was then lured to Crystal Palace by Terry Venables for two seasons and featured in 36 league games before moving to Italian Serie B side Ternana in 2000. At Palace he scored three times; once in the league against Norwich City and twice in a League Cup tie against Colchester United (once in the first leg and once in the second leg).

Following three injury-plagued seasons with a knee injury in Italy, he then joined English League 1 side Milton Keynes Dons (formerly Wimbledon F.C.) on a free transfer in November 2004, where he became a firm favourite with the fans. He is a lively and tricky player, known for his crossing and readiness to shoot on sight as well as his hard work and discipline. The summer of 2006 was not the best of times for Rizzo, who featured in the Dons' first pre-season game against Derby County but suffered an injury later in the season before going on loan to League Two side Grimsby Town and then League One side Chesterfield in 2007. It was announced on 8 May 2007 that Rizzo's contract with M K Dons had been terminated by mutual consent.

He then signed a two-year contract with Perth Glory on 19 May 2007, and made his debut on 26 August 2007, coming on in the 69th minute for Naum Sekulovski in a game against the Newcastle Jets.

Rizzo was not offered a new contract at Perth Glory, and went on to sign a short-term deal for the Central Coast Mariners to play in their AFC Champions League campaign. It was announced on 20 May 2009 that Nick Rizzo's contract with Central Coast Mariners would not be re-signed. Rizzo went on to play for APIA Leichhardt Tigers until 2011.

== International career ==
Nicky has represented Australia at the U17, U20, and U23 levels and is a full Australian international, having played for the Socceroos against Croatia in 1998. He also played in the 2000 Olympics for the Australian U23 team, which failed to go past the group stages.

== Coaching career ==
Since retiring, Rizzo has set up his own soccer school named "Nick Rizzo International Football School".

== A-League career statistics ==
(Correct as of 2 February 2009)

Club	Season	League			Finals			Asia			Total		
Club	Season	Apps	Goals	Assists	Apps	Goals	Assists	Apps	Goals	Assists	Apps	Goals	Assists
Perth Glory	2007–08	12	1	1	-	-	-	-	-	-	12	1	1
Perth Glory	2008–09	14	0	0	-	-	-	-	-	-	14	0	0
Central Coast Mariners	2008–09	0	0	0	-	-	-	1	0	0	1	0	0
Total		26	1	1	-	-	-	1	0	0	27	1	1

== Honours ==
Australia U-20

- OFC U-19 Men's Championship: 1998
