= Nathan Koo-Boothe =

English-Jamaican footballer (born 1985)

Personal information
- Full name: Nathan Djebril Koo-Boothe
- Date of birth: 18 July 1985 (age 41)
- Place of birth: Westminster, England
- Position: Defender

Senior career*
| Years | Team | Apps | (Gls) |
| 2002–2004 | Watford | 0 | (0) |
| 2004–2006 | Milton Keynes Dons | 1 | (0) |
| 2005 | → Grays Athletic (loan) | 2 | (0) |
| 2006–2007 | Kettering Town | 26 | (3) |
| 2007–2008 | Aldershot Town | 0 | (0) |
| 2008–2009 | Portmore United | | |
| 2009–2011 | Mosta | | |
| 2011 | Kettering Town | 13 | (0) |
| 2011–2012 | CD Castellón | | |
| 2012 | Hayes & Yeading United | 1 | (0) |
| 2012–2013 | Tooting & Mitcham United | 10 | (2) |
| 2013 | Farnborough | 7 | (0) |
| 2013 | Eastbourne Town | 1 | (0) |
| 2013–2014 | Farnborough | 2 | (0) |
| 2014 | Cray Wanderers | 6 | (0) |
| 2017–2018 | Three Bridges | | |

International career^{‡}
- Jamaica U21
- * Club domestic league appearances and goals as of 11:36, 8 April 2024 (UTC) ‡ National team caps and goals as of 2 November 2009

Nathan Djebril Koo-Boothe (born 18 July 1985) is a footballer who last played for Three Bridges as a defender.

== Career ==
Born in Westminster, London, Koo-Boothe joined Aldershot Town in December 2007 under contract until the end of the 2007–08 season. He left Aldershot on 2 March 2008, after failing to make an appearance in the Conference National. He joined Jamaican outfit Portmore United in summer 2008.

On 14 July 2009, it was confirmed that he would join Crewe Alexandra on trial. He went on to join Maltese Premier League club Mosta in 2009.

Koo-Boothe had a trial spell with South African club Kaizer Chiefs in January 2011, before rejoining Kettering Town in March 2011. He joined Spanish club CD Castellón in December 2011.

In January 2012 he moved to Hayes & Yeading United.

During the latter part of the 2013-14 season, Koo-Boothe played for Cray Wanderers, making six appearances in the Isthmian League Premier Division, and in the 2018-19 season he was playing for Three Bridges.
