= Ben Harding =

English footballer (born 1984)

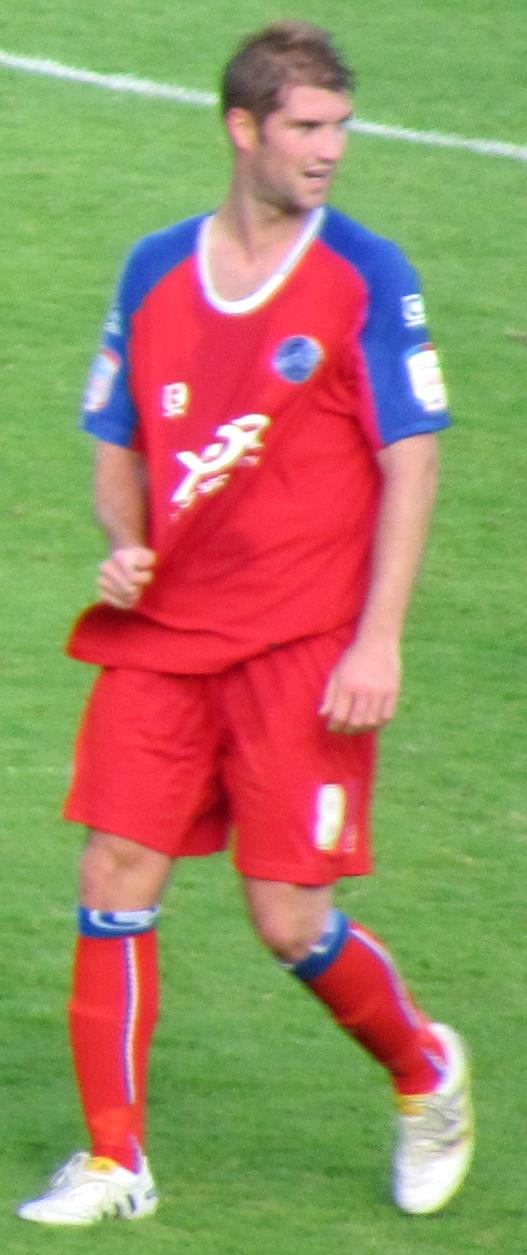
- Harding playing for Aldershot Town in 2010

Personal information
- Full name: Benjamin Scott Harding
- Date of birth: 6 September 1984 (age 42)
- Place of birth: Carshalton, England
- Height: 6 ft 3 in (1.91 m)
- Position: Midfielder

Team information
- Current team: Truro City

Youth career
- 2001–2003: Wimbledon

Senior career*
Years	Team	Apps	(Gls)
2003–2004	Wimbledon	15	(0)
2004–2007	Milton Keynes Dons	36	(6)
2005–2006	→ Forest Green Rovers (loan)	9	(1)
2006	→ Aldershot Town (loan)	15	(0)
2007	→ Grays Athletic (loan)	18	(1)
2007–2011	Aldershot Town	143	(10)
2011–2012	Wycombe Wanderers	7	(0)
2012	→ Northampton Town (loan)	5	(0)
2012–2013	Northampton Town	42	(2)
2013–2015	Torquay United	34	(0)
2015–2017	Gosport Borough	60	(1)
2017–	Truro City	52	(3)

International career
2008	England C	3	(0)

Managerial career
- 2018: Truro City (interim)
- * Club domestic league appearances and goals as of 01:32, 3 March 2019 (UTC)

Benjamin Scott Harding (born 6 September 1984) is an English professional footballer who plays for as a midfielder Truro City.

== Club career ==
=== Wimbledon and Milton Keynes Dons ===
Harding began his career at Wimbledon and signed terms with them in October 2001. He made his debut in November 2003, and made 42 league appearances before signing a new two-year deal in August 2005. In November 2005, Harding was loaned to Forest Green Rovers for two months. Injuries limited him to just 10 appearances for the now renamed MK Dons over the remainder of the 2005–6 season.

The following season, Harding was loaned out to the Conference National sides Aldershot Town and Grays Athletic. At the end of the season he was released by the MK Dons and he returned to Aldershot Town as a trialist.

=== Aldershot Town ===
Harding impressed in the trials and signed a contract in August 2007. He was an ever-present and instrumental player in the 2007–08 league campaign, as Aldershot Town won the Conference National title and the Conference League Cup. He was also one of five Aldershot Town players, that were named in the Conference Select XI Team of the Year. At the end of the season, Harding signed a new two-year contract, which would keep him at the Recreation Ground until the end of the 2009–10 season.

Harding made his 100th appearance for Aldershot Town in the home game against Wycombe Wanderers in December 2008. He tore an achilles in February 2009, which sidelined him for the remainder of season.

=== Wycombe Wanderers ===
On 23 May 2011, Harding signed a two-year contract with recently promoted League One side Wycombe Wanderers.

=== Northampton Town ===
After a month on loan at Sixfields, Harding joined Northampton Town, permanently signing an 18-month deal on deadline day.

=== Torquay United ===
On 13 July 2013, Harding signed for Torquay United on a two-year contract, becoming Alan Knill's fifth signing of the summer.

=== Truro City ===
On 28 July 2017, Harding signed for Truro City on a one-year contract, becoming Lee Hodges's second signing of the summer after Ben Gerring's release from Torquay United. On 8 August 2018, Harding was appointed interim manager of Truro, following Lee Hodges' resignation.

== International career ==
Harding's performances at Aldershot Town gained him an England C call up and debut in February 2008. Harding was also part of the England C squad, that won the Four Nations Tournament in May 2008.

== Honours ==
Aldershot Town

- Conference National: 2008
- Conference League Cup: 2008

England C

- Four Nations Tournament: 2008
