= Pete Winkelman =

Chairman of Milton Keynes Dons F.C.

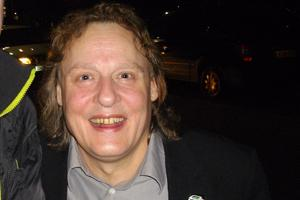
- Born: 9 November 1957 (age 68); Penn, Wolverhampton, England
- Occupations: Football club chairman; property developer; record label executive

Peter John Winkelman is the former chairman and owner of English association football club Milton Keynes Dons and former managing director of holding company Inter MK Ltd, which was involved in the development of the Denbigh North district of Milton Keynes.

He is most widely known as having facilitated the controversial relocation of Wimbledon F.C. to Milton Keynes and being responsible for their subsequent rebranding as 'Milton Keynes Dons F.C.'

== Early career ==
His earlier career was in pop music production, as a CBS executive.

== Involvement in football ==
Winkelman grew up as a supporter of his home town club, Wolverhampton Wanderers before his eventual involvement with Wimbledon and ultimately Milton Keynes Dons.

In 2001, in a deal facilitated by Winkelman, the Wimbledon FC board of directors decided to relocate the club to Milton Keynes, around 60 miles from its south London home base. The club, which went into administration in 2003, played their first match in Milton Keynes in September, controlled by an administrator. At the end of the season, the club was bought out by a consortium led by Winkelman, who became the club's chairman. The new board relaunched the club as "Milton Keynes Dons FC", also giving the side a new all-white strip and a new club crest.

In August 2024, Winkelman sold the club to a Kuwait-based consortium, with Fahad Al Ghamin replacing him as chairman. This ended his 21 year association with the club as owner.

== Personal life ==
He is married to his wife Berni. Winkelman moved to Milton Keynes in 1993, subsequently buying Great Linford Manor (a 17th-century mansion with a professional recording studio). The house was originally the manor house of Great Linford, a village and district of Milton Keynes.

== Honours ==
In June 2013, Winkelman was awarded an honorary doctorate by the Milton Keynes-based Open University "to mark his contribution to education through the world of professional football". On 12 November 2015, Milton Keynes Council awarded him the council's highest ceremonial honour, the Freedom of the Borough of Milton Keynes.
