= Shola Oyedele =

Nigerian footballer

Personal information
- Full name: Ade Shola Oyedele
- Date of birth: 14 September 1984 (age 42)
- Place of birth: Kano, Nigeria
- Height: 5 ft 11 in (1.80 m)
- Position: Defender

Youth career
- 2003–2004: Wimbledon

Senior career*
Years	Team	Apps	(Gls)
2004–2006	Milton Keynes Dons	37	(0)
2006	→ Woking (loan)	11	(0)
2006–2008	Woking	18	(0)
2008	Wingate & Finchley	4	(0)
Total		70	(0)
- * Club domestic league appearances and goals

Ade Shola Oyedele (born 14 September 1984) is a Nigerian former professional footballer who made 37 league appearances for Wimbledon – and its successor club Milton Keynes Dons – between 2003 and 2006. He later played non-League football for Woking and Wingate & Finchley.
