= Wade Small =

English footballer

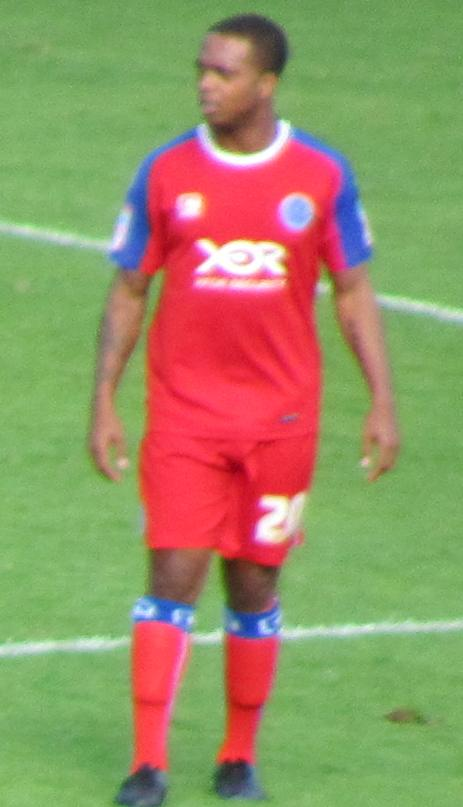

Personal information
- Full name: Wade Kristopher Small
- Date of birth: 23 February 1984 (age 42)
- Place of birth: Croydon, London, England
- Positions: Winger; striker

Youth career
- 2003: Wimbledon

Senior career*
Years	Team	Apps	(Gls)
2003–2004	Wimbledon	27	(2)
2004–2006	Milton Keynes Dons	72	(11)
2006–2009	Sheffield Wednesday	68	(7)
2009	→ Blackpool (loan)	5	(1)
2009	Charlton Athletic	0	(0)
2009–2010	Chesterfield	27	(4)
2010–2011	Aldershot Town	25	(5)
2011	Lewes	2	(0)
2011–2012	Tooting & Mitcham United		
2012–2013	Kingstonian		
- * Club domestic league appearances and goals

Wade Kristopher Small (born 23 February 1984) is an English professional footballer. His last known club was Kingstonian. Mainly a right winger, Small can also play on the left side and as a forward.

== Playing career ==
=== Early career: Wimbledon and Milton Keynes Dons ===
Small began his career at the Wimbledon academy and made his debut on 15 October 2003, as a 58th-minute substitute in a 1–0 defeat away at Coventry City. He scored his first goal on 26 December, in a 3–0 away win at Reading and went on to make a total of thirty appearances that season, scoring two goals, as Wimbledon finished bottom of the First Division and were relegated.

In 2004, Wimbledon were renamed Milton Keynes Dons after the club moved to Milton Keynes in September 2003. The following season he made a total of 49 appearances, scoring eleven goals including two in a 3–0 victory over Wrexham on 11 December. In August 2005, he signed a new two-year contract.

Small played most of his games for the Dons as a midfielder, on either wing, and also at times as a striker.

=== Sheffield Wednesday ===
On 15 May 2006, Small signed for Championship club Sheffield Wednesday for an undisclosed "substantial" transfer fee, signing a three-year contract. On signing Small, then Wednesday manager Paul Sturrock said, "I've seen Wade several times over the last couple of years and he's our type of signing. He is very quick, can play in a variety of positions offensively and has high potential. I hope he does very well for Sheffield Wednesday."

His first appearance was as an 80th-minute substitute in a 0–0 draw with Preston North End at Deepdale on 5 August. He scored his first goal when the Owls drew 2–2 with Wolverhampton Wanderers at Molineux. Injury problems restricted him to 23 appearances in his first season, scoring two goals. In November, during a three-match suspension, he had a minor operation on his knee, having carried the injury for a while.

In the 2007–08 season, he made 30 appearances, scoring four goals.

After making seven starts and thirteen substitute appearances in the 2008–09 season, he joined fellow Championship club Blackpool on 13 March 2009, on a one-month loan deal. A day later he scored on his debut as the Seasiders beat Barnsley 1–0 at Oakwell. Three days later he was named in the Football League's "Championship Team of the Week". On 8 May 2009, Small's contract with Sheffield Wednesday was terminated by mutual consent. Through the following summer, Small was reported to have held talks with Crystal Palace, Leeds United and Norwich City regarding moves to one of those clubs.

On 18 July 2009, Small began a trial at Charlton Athletic playing in a number of their friendlies. In August, he signed for the club on a non-contract basis. He left shortly after, his only game for Charlton being in a 1–0 defeat to Hereford United in the League Cup.

=== Chesterfield ===
In August 2009, Small signed with the Spireites on a one-year deal until June 2010. He made his first appearance for on 29 August 2009, in a League Two match against Morecambe as a 66th-minute substitute and scored his first goals for the club on his full debut, in a 5–1 Football League Trophy victory over Burton Albion on 1 September 2009.

Manager John Sheridan said: "Wade Small is an exciting player who is capable of causing problems for the opposition. He is quick and pacey and although he can play in all the forward positions he is also a versatile player." He added: "He will be a very useful addition to the squad and I am excited he has joined us."

During the 2010 January transfer window, Small was sensationally linked with a move to Bristol City after being spotted in a helicopter above Ashton Gate.

=== Aldershot Town ===
On 30 July 2010, Small signed for Aldershot Town. He left the club in 2011.

=== Non League ===
In the 2011–12 pre-season he joined Lewes and played in two competitive games for the club before moving to Tooting & Mitcham United at the beginning of September. In the summer of 2012, Small joined Kingstonian.
