= Alex Tapp =

English footballer

Personal information
- Full name: Alexander Nicholas Tapp
- Date of birth: 7 June 1982 (age 44)
- Place of birth: Redhill, England
- Position: Midfielder

Youth career
- 1994–2002: Wimbledon

Senior career*
Years	Team	Apps	(Gls)
2002–2004	Wimbledon	38	(3)
2004–2006	Milton Keynes Dons	12	(1)
2006	Lewes	1	(0)
2007	Tonbridge Angels		
2007–2008	Chipstead		
2009	Austin Aztex	5	(0)
- * Club domestic league appearances and goals

Alexander Nicholas Tapp (born 7 June 1982) is an English former footballer. He is a midfielder, who has played in the English Football League for Wimbledon and their successor Milton Keynes Dons.

== Career ==
=== Wimbledon/Milton Keynes Dons ===
Born in Redhill, England, Tapp started his football career with Wimbledon in 1994 and represented England Schoolboys in 1998 at the age of 15. He made his professional debut for Wimbledon in the First Division on 31 August 2002 in a 3–2 victory against Wolverhampton Wanderers and scored his first goal two weeks later in a 4–1 League Cup win against Southend United. Less than two months after his debut, Tapp suffered a hamstring injury which kept him out of the Wimbledon side for three months. He played in Wimbledon's final two seasons in The Football League, playing 43 games and scoring four goals, although his second season was cut short in January following a serious knee injury.

Wimbledon were relegated at the end of the season and finished bottom of the First Division table. The club had moved to Milton Keynes in 2003 and at the start of the 2004–05 season, the club was relaunched under the name of Milton Keynes Dons, now playing in the renamed third tier League One. Tapp suffered more injury problems and played only a further 15 games in his final season in The Football League. In August 2006, when Milton Keynes decided not to extend his contract, Tapp left after 12 years with the club.

=== English non-League ===
After leaving Milton Keynes, he had several unsuccessful trials with other league clubs, including Brentford and Oxford United, and played in one Conference South game for Lewes, before he joined Isthmian League Premier Division side Tonbridge Angels in February 2007. Tapp made his debut for Tonbridge against Margate on 20 February but was substituted during the first half after he picked up an injury. During the 2007–08 season, he appeared for Chipstead, who played in the Isthmian League Division One South.

=== Austin Aztex ===
In the late summer of 2008, Tapp moved to the United States and after seven months during which he acclimatised to the Texan weather and astroturf pitches, he joined the Austin Aztex ahead of their first season in the United Soccer Leagues First Division. He was the club's second English signing, following Gifton Noel-Williams, and joined another expatriate Adrian Heath, the manager of the side.
