= 2006–07 Milton Keynes Dons F.C. season =

Milton Keynes Dons
2006–07 season
- Chairman: Pete Winkelman
- Manager: Martin Allen
- Stadium: National Hockey Stadium
- League Two: 4th (qualified for play-offs)
- FA Cup: Second round
- League Cup: Third round
- League Trophy: Second round
- Top goalscorer: League: Izale McLeod (21); All: Izale McLeod (24)
- Highest home attendance: 8,306 (vs Tottenham Hotspur); 25 October 2006, League Cup R3
- Lowest home attendance: 2,676 (vs Farsley Celtic); 21 November 2006, FA Cup R1
- Average home league attendance: 5,990
- Biggest win: 3–4 (vs Accrington Stanley); 9 December 2006, League Two
- Biggest defeat: 5–0 (vs Rochdale); 27 January 2007, League Two; 0–5 (vs Tottenham Hotspur); 25 October 2006, League Cup R3
| Home colours | Away colours | Third colours |

The 2006–2007 season was Milton Keynes Dons' third season in their existence as a professional association football club. This season was their first season competing in League Two, the fourth tier of English football, following their relegation from League One at the conclusion of the 2005–06 season.

As well as competing in League Two, the club also participated in the FA Cup, League Cup and League Trophy.

The season covers the period from 1 July 2006 to 30 June 2007.

== Competitions ==
=== League Two ===
Final table

| Pos | Team | Pld | W | D | L | GF | GA | GD | Pts |
|---|---|---|---|---|---|---|---|---|---|
| 3 | Swindon Town (P) | 46 | 25 | 10 | 11 | 58 | 38 | +20 | 85 |
| 4 | Milton Keynes Dons | 46 | 25 | 9 | 12 | 76 | 58 | +18 | 84 |
| 5 | Lincoln City | 46 | 21 | 11 | 14 | 70 | 59 | +11 | 74 |
| 6 | Bristol Rovers | 46 | 20 | 12 | 14 | 49 | 42 | +7 | 72 |
| 7 | Shrewsbury Town (P) | 46 | 18 | 17 | 11 | 68 | 46 | +22 | 71 |

Source: Sky Sports

Matches

| Win | Draw | Loss |

| Date | Opponent | Venue | Result | Scorers | Attendance | Ref |
|---|---|---|---|---|---|---|
| 5 August 2006 – 15:00 | Bury | Home | 2–1 | McLeod (2) | 5,329 | |
| 8 August 2006 – 19:45 | Mansfield Town | Away | 1–2 | Wilbraham | 4,033 | |
| 12 August 2006 – 15:00 | Macclesfield Town | Away | 2–1 | Platt, Swailes (o.g.) | 1,711 | |
| 19 August 2006 – 15:00 | Bristol Rovers | Home | 2–0 | Dyer, Platt | 5,125 | |
| 26 August 2006 – 15:00 | Boston United | Away | 1–0 | Platt | 2,032 | |
| 2 September 2006 – 15:00 | Notts County | Home | 3–2 | Dyer (2), Taylor | 6,323 | |
| 9 September 2006 – 15:00 | Hartlepool United | Home | 0–0 | | 5,630 | |
| 12 September 2006 – 19:45 | Swindon Town | Away | 1–2 | McGovern | 8,304 | |
| 16 September 2006 – 15:00 | Lincoln City | Away | 3–2 | McLeod, Wilbraham, Platt | 5,310 | |
| 23 September 2006 – 15:00 | Chester City | Home | 1–2 | Platt | 5,476 | |
| 26 September 2006 – 19:45 | Torquay United | Home | 3–2 | McLeod (2), Wilbraham | 5,378 | |
| 30 September 2006 – 15:00 | Barnet | Away | 3–3 | O'Hanlon, Chorley, Dyer | 2,819 | |
| 6 October 2006 – 19:45 | Peterborough United | Home | 0–2 | | 6,647 | |
| 14 October 2006 – 15:00 | Wrexham | Away | 2–1 | O'Hanlon, McLeod | 3,828 | |
| 21 October 2006 – 15:00 | Hereford United | Home | 1–3 | McLeod | 5,609 | |
| 28 October 2006 – 15:00 | Walsall | Away | 0–0 | | 6,275 | |
| 4 November 2006 – 15:00 | Grimsby Town | Away | 3–1 | McLeod, Wilbraham (2) | 3,268 | |
| 18 November 2006 – 15:00 | Shrewsbury Town | Home | 2–0 | Edds, Platt | 5,830 | |
| 25 November 2006 – 15:00 | Darlington | Away | 0–1 | | 4,017 | |
| 5 December 2006 – 19:45 | Stockport County | Home | 2–0 | McLeod (2) | 4,564 | |
| 9 December 2006 – 15:00 | Accrington Stanley | Away | 4–3 | McLeod, Wilbraham (2), O'Hanlon | 1,384 | |
| 16 December 2006 – 15:00 | Wycombe Wanderers | Home | 3–1 | Andrews, McLeod (2) | 5,977 | |
| 23 December 2006 – 15:00 | Rochdale | Home | 2–1 | McLeod, Standon (o.g.) | 5,459 | |
| 26 December 2006 – 15:00 | Torquay United | Away | 2–0 | Platt, McLeod | 2,715 | |
| 30 December 2006 – 15:00 | Chester City | Away | 3–0 | Platt, McLeod, McGovern | 2,211 | |
| 1 January 2007 – 15:00 | Swindon Town | Home | 0–1 | | 6,797 | |
| 6 January 2007 – 19:45 | Lincoln City | Home | 2–2 | McLeod, Edds | 7,140 | |
| 13 January 2007 – 15:00 | Hartlepool United | Away | 0–1 | | 4,851 | |
| 20 January 2007 – 15:00 | Barnet | Home | 3–1 | Platt (3) | 6,447 | |
| 27 January 2007 – 15:00 | Rochdale | Away | 0–5 | | 2,493 | |
| 3 February 2007 – 15:00 | Bury | Away | 2–0 | Knight, Andrews | 2,325 | |
| 17 February 2007 – 15:00 | Bristol Rovers | Away | 1–1 | McGovern | 5,489 | |
| 20 February 2007 – 19:45 | Mansfield Town | Home | 1–1 | Taylor | 5,070 | |
| 24 February 2007 – 15:00 | Notts County | Away | 2–2 | Dyer, Lewington | 4,031 | |
| 3 March 2007 – 15:00 | Boston United | Home | 3–2 | Platt (2), McLeod | 6,605 | |
| 10 March 2007 – 15:00 | Peterborough United | Away | 0–4 | | 5,880 | |
| 13 March 2007 – 19:45 | Macclesfield Town | Home | 3–0 | McLeod, Platt, Lee (o.g.) | 5,681 | |
| 17 March 2007 – 15:00 | Wrexham | Home | 2–1 | Andrews, Platt | 5,712 | |
| 25 March 2007 – 16:00 | Walsall | Home | 1–1 | McLeod | 8,044 | |
| 31 March 2007 – 15:00 | Hereford United | Away | 0–0 | | 2,715 | |
| 7 April 2007 - 15:00 | Grimsby Town | Home | 1–2 | Andrews | 6,101 | |
| 9 April 2007 – 15:00 | Shrewsbury Town | Away | 1–2 | Platt | 5,238 | |
| 14 April 2007 – 15:00 | Darlington | Home | 1–0 | Platt | 5,730 | |
| 21 April 2007 – 15:00 | Stockport County | Away | 2–1 | Platt, Andrews | 5,681 | |
| 28 April 2007 – 15:00 | Wycombe Wanderers | Away | 2–0 | Smith, McLeod | 7,150 | |
| 5 May 2007 – 15:00 | Accrington Stanley | Home | 3–1 | Andrews, O'Hanlon, Stirling | 8,102 | |

Play-offs

| Date | Opponent | Venue | Result | Scorers | Attendance | Ref |
|---|---|---|---|---|---|---|
| 14 May 2007 – 19:45 | Shrewsbury Town | Away | 0–0 | | 7,126 | |
| 18 May 2007 – 19:45 | Shrewsbury Town | Home | 1–2 | Andrews | 8,212 | |

=== FA Cup ===
Matches

| Win | Draw | Loss |

| Date | Round | Opponent | Venue | Result | Scorers | Attendance | Ref |
|---|---|---|---|---|---|---|---|
| 12 November 2006 – 15:00 | First round | Farsley Celtic | Away | 0–0 | | 2,200 | |
| 21 November 2006 – 19:45 | First round (replay) | Farsley Celtic | Home | 2–0 | McLeod (2) | 2,676 | |
| 2 December 2006 – 15:00 | Second round | Blackpool | Home | 0–2 | | 3,837 | |

=== League Cup ===
Matches

| Win | Draw | Loss |

| Date | Round | Opponent | Venue | Result | Scorers | Attendance | Ref |
|---|---|---|---|---|---|---|---|
| 22 August 2006 – 19:45 | First round | Colchester United | Home | 1–0 (Note: After extra-time. 0–0 at the conclusion of 90 minutes.) | McLeod | 2,747 | |
| 19 September 2006 – 19:45 | Second round | Barnsley | Away | 2–1 | Wilbraham (2) | 4,411 | |
| 25 October 2006 – 19:45 | Third round | Tottenham Hotspur | Home | 0–5 | | 8,306 | |

=== League Trophy ===
Matches

| Win | Draw | Loss |

| Date | Round | Opponent | Venue | Result | Scorers | Attendance | Ref |
|---|---|---|---|---|---|---|---|
| 1 November 2006 – 19:45 | Second round | Brighton & Hove Albion | Away | 1–4 | Page | 2,774 | |

== Player details ==
List of squad players, including number of appearances by competition.
Players with squad numbers struck through and marked † left the club during the playing season.

| No. | Pos | Nat | Player | Total | | League Two | | FA Cup | | League Cup | | Other (Note: Includes Football League Trophy and 2006–07 Football League Two play-offs.) | |
| No. | Pos | Nat | Player | Apps | Goals | Apps | Goals | Apps | Goals | Apps | Goals | Apps | Goals |
|---|---|---|---|---|---|---|---|---|---|---|---|---|---|
| 1 | GK | (Nigeria) NGA | Ademola Bankole | 9 | 0 | 6 | 0 | 0 | 0 | 1 | 0 | 2 | 0 |
| 2 | DF | (England) ENG | Jamie Smith | 20 | 0 | 17 | 0 | 2 | 0 | 1 | 0 | 0 | 0 |
| 3 | DF | (England) ENG | Dean Lewington | 52 | 1 | 45 | 1 | 3 | 0 | 2 | 0 | 2 | 0 |
| 4 | DF | (Guinea) GUI | Drissa Diallo | 46 | 0 | 40 | 0 | 2 | 0 | 2 | 0 | 2 | 0 |
| 5 | MF | (England) ENG | Dominic Blizzard | 10 | 0 | 8 | 0 | 0 | 0 | 0 | 0 | 2 | 0 |
| 6 | DF | (England) ENG | Sean O'Hanlon | 43 | 4 | 38 | 4 | 2 | 0 | 2 | 0 | 1 | 0 |
| 7 | MF | (Scotland) SCO | Jon-Paul McGovern | 52 | 3 | 44 | 3 | 3 | 0 | 3 | 0 | 2 | 0 |
| 8 | MF | (England) ENG | Paul Mitchell | 24 | 0 | 20 | 0 | 1 | 0 | 2 | 0 | 1 | 0 |
| 9 | FW | (England) ENG | Clive Platt | 48 | 18 | 43 | 18 | 3 | 0 | 2 | 0 | 0 | 0 |
| 10 | FW | (England) ENG | Izale McLeod | 41 | 24 | 34 | 21 | 2 | 2 | 2 | 1 | 3 | 0 |
| 11 | FW | (Australia) AUS | Nick Rizzo | 5 | 0 | 3 | 0 | 1 | 0 | 0 | 0 | 1 | 0 |
| 12 | DF | (England) ENG | Jude Stirling | 46 | 1 | 44 | 1 | 0 | 0 | 0 | 0 | 2 | 0 |
| 13 | MF | (Republic of Ireland) IRL | Keith Andrews | 40 | 8 | 34 | 7 | 3 | 0 | 1 | 0 | 2 | 1 |
| 14 | MF | (England) ENG | Gary Smith | 23 | 1 | 23 | 1 | 0 | 0 | 0 | 0 | 0 | 0 |
| 15 | MF | (Australia) AUS | Gareth Edds | 43 | 2 | 35 | 2 | 3 | 0 | 3 | 0 | 2 | 0 |
| 16 | FW | (England) ENG | Leon Knight | 18 | 1 | 16 | 1 | 0 | 0 | 0 | 0 | 2 | 0 |
| 17 | DF | (England) ENG | Ben Chorley | 15 | 1 | 13 | 1 | 0 | 0 | 2 | 0 | 0 | 0 |
| 18 | MF | (England) ENG | Ben Harding | 1 | 0 | 0 | 0 | 0 | 0 | 1 | 0 | 0 | 0 |
| 19 | FW | (England) ENG | Scott Taylor | 42 | 2 | 34 | 2 | 3 | 0 | 3 | 0 | 2 | 0 |
| 20 | FW | (England) ENG | Aaron Wilbraham | 36 | 9 | 32 | 7 | 2 | 0 | 2 | 2 | 0 | 0 |
| ~~21~~ † | GK | (England) ENG | Matt Baker | 0 | 0 | 0 | 0 | 0 | 0 | 0 | 0 | 0 | 0 |
| 22 | FW | (England) ENG | John Hastings | 12 | 0 | 7 | 0 | 2 | 0 | 2 | 0 | 1 | 0 |
| 23 | FW | (England) ENG | Lloyd Dyer | 47 | 5 | 41 | 5 | 2 | 0 | 2 | 0 | 2 | 0 |
| 24 | MF | (England) ENG | Junior Lewis | 0 | 0 | 0 | 0 | 0 | 0 | 0 | 0 | 0 | 0 |
| ~~25~~ † | GK | (Thailand) THA | Jamie Waite | 3 | 0 | 3 | 0 | 0 | 0 | 0 | 0 | 0 | 0 |
| ~~26~~ † | DF | (Republic of Ireland) IRL | Paul Butler | 18 | 0 | 17 | 0 | 1 | 0 | 0 | 0 | 0 | 0 |
| 27 | DF | (England) ENG | Adam Watts | 2 | 0 | 2 | 0 | 0 | 0 | 0 | 0 | 0 | 0 |
| 31 | GK | (Spain) ESP | Adolfo Baines | 23 | 0 | 19 | 0 | 1 | 0 | 2 | 0 | 1 | 0 |
| 35 | DF | (England) ENG | Sam Page | 2 | 1 | 1 | 0 | 0 | 0 | 0 | 0 | 1 | 1 |
| 36 | DF | (England) ENG | Kieran Murphy | 0 | 0 | 0 | 0 | 0 | 0 | 0 | 0 | 0 | 0 |
| ~~37~~ † | DF | (England) ENG | Joe Howe | 2 | 0 | 0 | 0 | 0 | 0 | 1 | 0 | 1 | 0 |
| 38 | FW | (England) ENG | Sam Baldock | 2 | 0 | 1 | 0 | 0 | 0 | 0 | 0 | 1 | 0 |
| 39 | FW | (England) ENG | Sam Collins | 1 | 0 | 0 | 0 | 0 | 0 | 0 | 0 | 1 | 0 |
| 40 | DF | (England) ENG | Oliver Thorne | 0 | 0 | 0 | 0 | 0 | 0 | 0 | 0 | 0 | 0 |
| ~~41~~ † | GK | (England) ENG | Rob Webb | 0 | 0 | 0 | 0 | 0 | 0 | 0 | 0 | 0 | 0 |
| ~~42~~ † | DF | (England) ENG | James Nash | 0 | 0 | 0 | 0 | 0 | 0 | 0 | 0 | 0 | 0 |

== Transfers ==
=== Transfers in ===
| Date from | Position | Name | From | Fee | Ref. |
|---|---|---|---|---|---|
| 1 July 2006 | GK | (Thailand) Jamie Waite | Sudbury | Free transfer | |
| 3 July 2006 | DF | (Guinea) Drissa Diallo | Free agent (Note: Previous club: Sheffield Wednesday.) | Free transfer | |
| 3 July 2006 | DF | (England) Sean O'Hanlon | Free agent (Note: Previous club: Swindon Town.) | Compensation | |
| 4 July 2006 | MF | (Scotland) Jon-Paul McGovern | Free agent (Note: Previous club: Sheffield Wednesday.) | Free transfer | |
| 14 July 2006 | MF | (England) John Hastings | Tooting & Mitcham United | Undisclosed | |
| 1 August 2006 | FW | (England) Lloyd Dyer | Free agent (Note: Previous club: Millwall.) | Free transfer | |
| 30 August 2006 | MF | (Republic of Ireland) Keith Andrews | Free agent (Note: Previous club: Hull City.) | Free transfer | |
| 4 January 2007 | GK | (England) Lee Harper | Northampton Town | Undisclosed | |
| 23 January 2007 | FW | (England) Leon Knight | Swansea City | Undisclosed | |
| 21 May 2007 | MF | (England) Dominic Blizzard | Watford | Free transfer | |

=== Transfers out ===
| Date from | Position | Name | To | Fee | Ref. |
|---|---|---|---|---|---|
| 1 July 2006 | MF | (England) Nick McKoy | Released (Note: Joined Cardiff City on 5 July 2006.) | | |
| 1 January 2007 | GK | (Thailand) Jamie Waite | Released (Note: Joined St Albans City in August 2007.) | | |
| 2 January 2007 | DF | (Wales) Craig Morgan | Peterborough United | Undisclosed | |
| 5 January 2007 | DF | (England) Leon Crooks | Wycombe Wanderers | Undisclosed | |
| 17 January 2007 | DF | (England) Joe Howe | Released (Note: Joined Northampton Town on 27 July 2007.) | | |
| 17 January 2007 | FW | (England) Joe Tillen | Released (Note: Joined Thatcham Town on 12 December 2007.) | | |
| 17 January 2007 | GK | (England) Rob Webb | Released (Note: Joined Cardiff City on 5 July 2006.) | | |

=== Loans in ===
| Start date | Position | Name | From | End date | Ref. |
|---|---|---|---|---|---|
| 27 October 2006 | GK | (England) Lee Harper | Northampton Town | 27 January 2007 (Note: On 4 January 2007, Harper's loan deal became a permanent deal.) | |
| 22 November 2006 | DF | (Republic of Ireland) Paul Butler | Leeds United | 2 January 2007 | |
| 10 January 2007 | FW | (Republic of Ireland) Jonny Hayes | Reading | End of season | |
| March 2007 | MF | (England) Dominic Blizzard | Watford | End of season | |
| 22 March 2007 | FW | (Sierra Leone) Albert Jarrett | Watford | End of season | |
| 23 March 2007 | DF | (England) Adam Watts | Fulham | End of season | |

=== Loans out ===
| Start date | Position | Name | To | End date | Ref. |
|---|---|---|---|---|---|
| 31 August 2006 | MF | (England) Ben Harding | Aldershot | January 2007 | |
| 16 October 2006 | DF | (Wales) Craig Morgan | Wrexham | 16 November 2006 | |
| 26 October 2006 | DF | (England) Ben Chorley | Gillingham | 26 January 2006 | |
| 23 November 2006 | DF | (Wales) Craig Morgan | Peterborough United | 2 January 2007 | |
| 3 January 2007 | MF | (England) Ben Harding | Grays Athletic | End of season | |
| 4 January 2007 | FW | (Australia) Nick Rizzo | Grimsby Town | Unknown | |
| 12 January 2007 | MF | (England) Paul Mitchell | (Wales) Wrexham | 12 April 2007 | |
| 9 February 2007 | DF | (England) Sam Page | Cambridge United | End of season | |
| 8 March 2007 | FW | (England) Scott Taylor | Brentford | 8 April 2007 | |
| 22 March 2007 | FW | (Australia) Nick Rizzo | Chesterfield | End of season | |
