= 2007–08 Milton Keynes Dons F.C. season =

Milton Keynes Dons
2007–08 season
- Chairman: Pete Winkelman
- Manager: Paul Ince
- Stadium: Stadium mk
- League Two: 1st (promoted to League One)
- FA Cup: First round
- League Cup: Second round
- League Trophy: Winners
- Top goalscorer: League: Mark Wright (13); All: Mark Wright (15)
- Highest home attendance: 17,250 (vs Morecambe); 3 May 2008, League Two
- Lowest home attendance: 5,087 (vs Peterborough United); 9 October 2007, League Trophy R2
- Average home league attendance: 9,456
- Biggest win: 5–0 (vs Accrington Stanley); 8 December 2007, League Two
- Biggest defeat: 0–2 (vs Stockport County); 27 October 2007, League Two
| Home colours | Away colours | Third colours |

The 2007–08 season was the fourth season of competitive association football in the Football League played by Milton Keynes Dons Football Club, a professional football club based in Milton Keynes, Buckinghamshire, England. Their fourth-place finish in 2006–07 and loss to Shrewsbury Town in the play-offs meant it was their second successive season in League Two. After the closure of the National Hockey Stadium this was the first season where the MK Dons played home fixtures at Stadium mk. The season ran from 1 July 2007 to 30 June 2008.

Paul Ince, starting his first season as Milton Keynes Dons manager, made nine permanent summer signings. After the eighth round of League Two fixtures the MK Dons reached first place and occupied this spot in thirty-seven of the remaining thirty-eight game weeks; they ended the season as champions of the twenty-four-team 2007–08 Football League Two. MK Dons also won their first national knockout competition, with a 2–0 victory over Grimsby Town at Wembley Stadium in the 2008 Football League Trophy Final. They lost in their opening round match in the 2007–08 FA Cup, and were eliminated in the second round of the Football League Cup.

Thirty-one players made at least one appearance in nationally organised first-team competition, and there were sixteen different goalscorers. Defender Dean Lewington missed only two of the fifty-five first-team matches over the season. Mark Wright finished as leading scorer with fifteen goals, of which thirteen came in league competition and two came in the Football League Trophy. Keith Andrews won the Football League Two Player of the Year Award.

== Background and pre-season ==
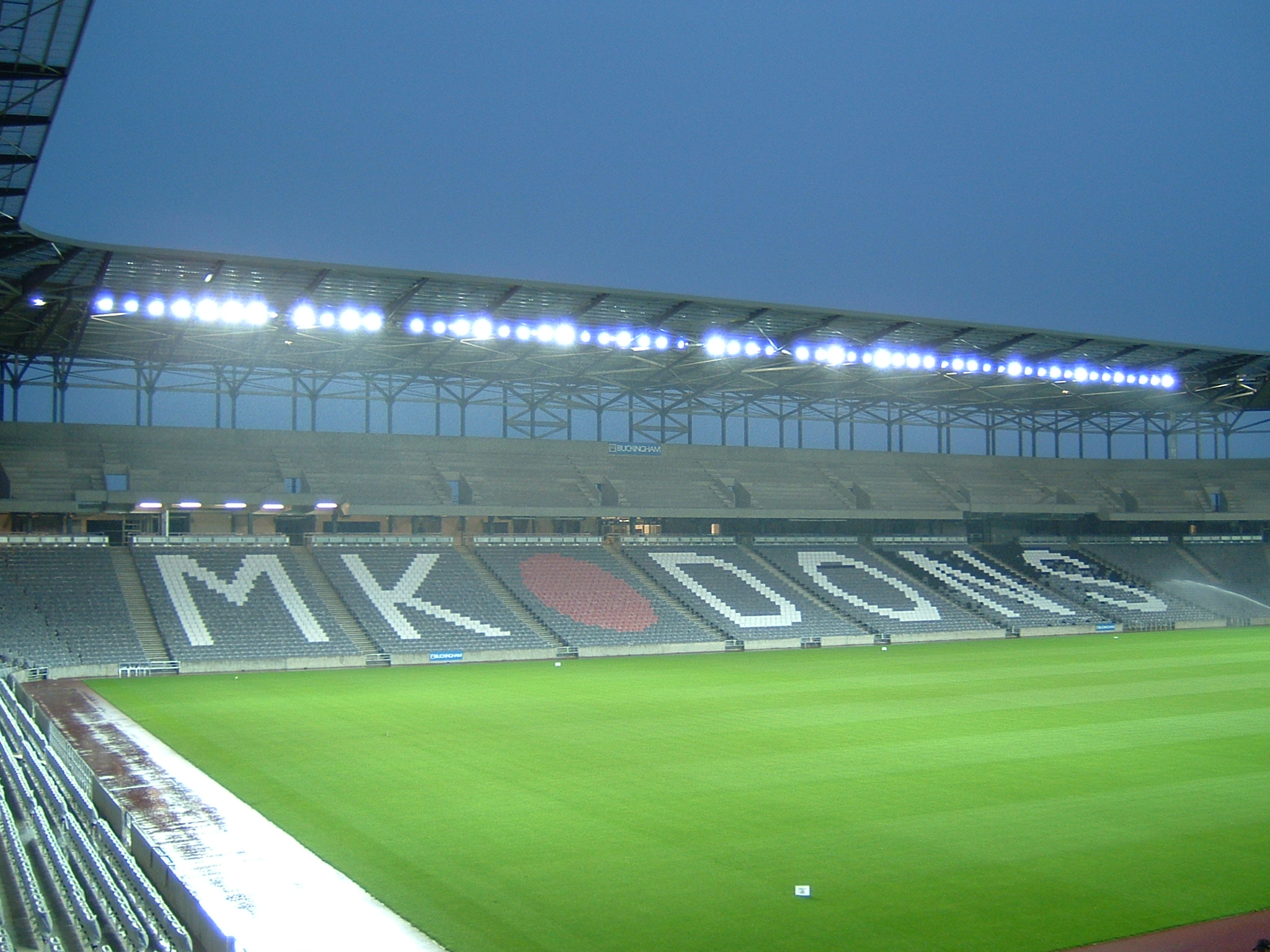
The 2007–08 season saw the Milton Keynes Dons move into Stadium mk.

The 2006–07 season was Martin Allen first season as manager of Milton Keynes Dons, after Danny Wilson was sacked at the end of the 2005–06 season for failing to save the club from relegation to League Two. Having been second come the start of 2007, the team finished in fourth-place in the 2006–07 Football League Two – one point below an automatic promotion place; this meant that the team participated in the League Two play-offs. MK Dons were beaten 2–1 on aggregate by Shrewsbury Town in the play-off semi-final. In May 2007 Allen moved on to manage Championship side Leicester City after both clubs had negotiated a compensation package.

Ahead of 2007–08, MK Dons released Adolfo Baines, Lee Harper, Junior Lewis, Nick Rizzo, Jamie Smith and Oliver Thorne. Players sold were Paul Butler to Chester City, Dominic Blizzard to Stockport County, Gary Smith to Brentford, Izale McLeod to Charlton Athletic and Clive Platt to Colchester United. Milton Keynes Dons made nine summer signings, those being goalkeepers Nathan Abbey from Brentford and Willy Guéret from Swansea City; defender Jude Stirling from Peterborough United; midfielders Colin Cameron from Coventry City, Luke Howell from Gillingham, Alan Navarro from Macclesfield Town and Mark Wright from Walsall; and forwards Drewe Broughton from Chester City and Kevin Gallen from Queens Park Rangers.

== Summary and aftermath ==
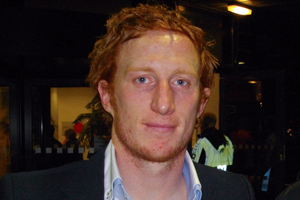
Dean Lewington made the most appearances for the club in the 2007–08 season.

On 29 September 2007 Milton Keynes Dons reached first place and stayed there for the rest of the season except for one game week. The lowest position the club occupied was 19th after the first round of fixtures. For the first time in their history, the MK Dons had a better record away than at home in the league. The team won 18 matches, drew three and lost two away, compared to winning 11, drawing seven and losing five at home. Dean Lewington recorded the highest number of appearances during the season, appearing in 53 of the MK Dons' 55 matches. Mark Wright was the Dons' top scorer in the league and in all competitions, with 11 league goals and 15 in total. Three other players, Keith Andrews, Lloyd Dyer and Aaron Wilbraham, reached double figures.

As a result of their promotion the Milton Keynes Dons returned to Football League One after two seasons in League Two. Prior to the club's return to League One, the MK Dons released Drewe Broughton, Matt Carbon, Sam Collins, Liam Kelly, Jake Livermore and Kieran Murphy, while Mustapha Carayol, Lloyd Dyer and Gareth Edds left on their own accord for Torquay United, Leicester City and Tranmere Rovers. New players to join were midfielders Flavien Belson from FC Metz, Peter Leven from Chesterfield and Florian Sturm from FC Vaduz.

== Competitions ==
=== League Two ===
Final table

| Pos | Team | Pld | W | D | L | GF | GA | GD | Pts |
|---|---|---|---|---|---|---|---|---|---|
| 1 | Milton Keynes Dons (C,P) | 46 | 29 | 10 | 7 | 82 | 37 | +45 | 97 |
| 2 | Peterborough United (P) | 46 | 28 | 8 | 10 | 84 | 43 | +41 | 92 |
| 3 | Hereford United (P) | 46 | 26 | 10 | 10 | 72 | 41 | +31 | 88 |
| 4 | Stockport County (P) | 46 | 24 | 10 | 12 | 72 | 54 | +18 | 82 |
| 5 | Rochdale | 46 | 23 | 11 | 12 | 77 | 54 | +23 | 80 |

Source: Sky Sports

Matches

| Win | Draw | Loss |

| Date | Opponent | Venue | Result | Scorers | Attendance | Position | Ref |
|---|---|---|---|---|---|---|---|
| 11 August 2007 – 15:00 | Bury | Home | 1–2 | Andrews | 7,740 | 19 | |
| 18 August 2007 – 15:00 | Macclesfield Town | Away | 3–3 | Andrews, Knight, Cameron | 2,257 | 17 | |
| 25 August 2007 – 15:00 | Shrewsbury Town | Home | 3–0 | Knight, Wilbraham, Dyer | 7,380 | 10 | |
| 1 September 2007 – 15:00 | Rochdale | Away | 2–3 | Gallen (2) | 2,743 | 12 | |
| 7 September 2007 – 19:45 | Notts County | Home | 3–0 | Andrews, Swailes, Wilbraham | 7,977 | 8 | |
| 15 September 2007 – 15:00 | Brentford | Away | 3–0 | Andrews (2), Johnson | 4,476 | 6 | |
| 22 September 2007 – 15:00 | Darlington | Home | 1–0 | Diallo | 7,901 | 5 | |
| 29 September 2007 – 15:00 | Morecambe | Away | 1–0 | Dyer | 2,688 | 1 | |
| 2 October 2007 – 19:45 | Mansfield Town | Away | 2–1 | Stirling, Dyer | 1,984 | 1 | |
| 6 October 2007 – 15:00 | Bradford City | Home | 2–1 | Andrews, Swailes | 7,903 | 1 | |
| 14 October 2007 – 13:30 | Lincoln City | Home | 4–0 | Knight (2), Dyer, Wilbraham | 13,037 | 1 | |
| 20 October 2007 – 15:00 | Hereford United | Away | 1–0 | Wright | 3,936 | 1 | |
| 27 October 2007 – 15:00 | Stockport County | Home | 0–2 | | 8,290 | 1 | |
| 3 November 2007 – 15:00 | Wycombe Wanderers | Away | 1–1 | Cameron | 5,929 | 1 | |
| 6 November 2007 – 19:45 | Grimsby Town | Home | 2–0 | Wilbraham, Wright | 6,797 | 1 | |
| 17 November 2007 – 15:00 | Chester City | Away | 2–0 | Wright, Johnson | 3,102 | 1 | |
| 24 November 2007 – 15:00 | Chesterfield | Home | 1–2 | Wright | 9,638 | 1 | |
| 4 December 2007 – 19:45 | Dagenham & Redbridge | Away | 1–0 | Diallo | 1,880 | 1 | |
| 8 December 2007 – 15:00 | Accrington Stanley | Home | 5–0 | Andrews, Navarro, Cameron, Dyer (2) | 6,917 | 1 | |
| 15 December 2007 – 15:00 | Peterborough United | Away | 2–1 | Gallen, Andrews | 10,351 | 1 | |
| 21 December 2007 – 19:45 | Brentford | Home | 1–1 | Gallen | 8,445 | 1 | |
| 26 December 2007 – 15:00 | Notts County | Away | 2–1 | Wright, Johnson | 5,106 | 1 | |
| 29 December 2007 – 15:00 | Darlington | Away | 1–0 | Johnson | 5,304 | 1 | |
| 1 January 2008 – 15:00 | Mansfield Town | Home | 1–0 | Andrews | 9,583 | 1 | |
| 5 January 2008 – 15:00 | Rotherham United | Away | 1–0 | Wright | 5,421 | 1 | |
| 12 January 2008 – 15:00 | Barnet | Home | 0–1 | | 9,881 | 1 | |
| 19 January 2008 – 15:00 | Wrexham | Away | 0–1 | | 4,319 | 1 | |
| 26 January 2008 – 15:00 | Rochdale | Home | 0–1 | | 7,882 | 1 | |
| 29 January 2008 – 19:45 | Macclesfield Town | Home | 1–1 | O'Hanlon | 6,483 | 1 | |
| 2 February 2008 – 15:00 | Bury | Away | 5–1 | Wright (3), Dyer, Gallen | 2,241 | 1 | |
| 9 February 2008 – 15:00 | Rotherham United | Home | 1–1 | Gallen | 9,455 | 1 | |
| 12 February 2008 – 19:45 | Shrewsbury Town | Away | 3–3 | Wright (2), Gallen | 5,474 | 1 | |
| 23 February 2008 – 15:00 | Barnet | Away | 2–0 | Navarro, Dyer | 2,495 | 1 | |
| 1 March 2008 – 15:00 | Chester City | Home | 1–0 | Swailes | 8,172 | 1 | |
| 7 March 2008 – 19:45 | Grimsby Town | Away | 1–0 | O'Hanlon | 4,106 | 1 | |
| 10 March 2008 – 19:45 | Chesterfield | Away | 2–1 | Andrews, Dyer | 3,834 | 1 | |
| 15 March 2008 – 15:00 | Dagenham & Redbridge | Home | 4–0 | Wilbraham (2), Dyer, Gallen | 9,417 | 1 | |
| 21 March 2008 – 15:00 | Peterborough United | Home | 1–1 | Wilbraham | 14,521 | 1 | |
| 24 March 2008 – 15:00 | Accrington Stanley | Away | 1–0 | Wright | 1,559 | 1 | |
| 4 April 2008 – 19:45 | Lincoln City | Away | 2–1 | Regan, Johnson | 3,896 | 2 | |
| 8 April 2008 – 19:45 | Wrexham | Home | 4–1 | Swailes, Wilbraham (2), O'Hanlon | 8,646 | 1 | |
| 12 April 2008 – 15:00 | Wycombe Wanderers | Home | 2–2 | Wilbraham, O'Hanlon | 12,747 | 1 | |
| 15 April 2008 – 19:45 | Hereford United | Home | 0–0 | | 11,428 | 1 | |
| 19 April 2008 – 15:00 | Stockport County | Away | 3–2 | Wright, Navarro, Andrews | 8,838 | 1 | |
| 26 April 2008 – 15:00 | Bradford City | Away | 2–1 | Stirling, Dyer | 14,609 | 1 | |
| 3 May 2008 – 15:00 | Morecambe | Home | 1–1 | Wilbraham | 17,250 | 1 | |

=== FA Cup ===
Matches

| Win | Draw | Loss |

| Date | Round | Opponent | Venue | Result | Scorers | Attendance | Ref |
|---|---|---|---|---|---|---|---|
| 10 November 2007 – 15:00 | First round | Crewe Alexandra | Away | 1–2 | Johnson | 3,049 | |

=== League Cup ===
Matches

| Win | Draw | Loss |

| Date | Round | Opponent | Venue | Result | Scorers | Attendance | Ref |
|---|---|---|---|---|---|---|---|
| 14 August 2007 – 19:45 | First round | Ipswich Town | Home | 3–3 (Note: After extra-time. 2–2 at the conclusion of 90 minutes. MK Dons won 5–3 on penalties.) | Knight, Bruce (o.g.), Gallen | 7,496 | |
| 28 August 2007 – 19:45 | Second round | Sheffield United | Home | 2–3 (Note: After extra-time. 2–2 at the conclusion of 90 minutes.) | Broughton, McGovern | 7,943 | |

=== League Trophy ===
Matches

| Win | Draw | Loss |

| Date | Round | Opponent | Venue | Result | Scorers | Attendance | Ref |
|---|---|---|---|---|---|---|---|
| 9 October 2007 – 19:45 | Second round | Peterborough United | Home | 3–1 | Wright (2), Cameron | 5,087 | |
| 13 November 2007 – 19:45 | Quarter-final (South) | Bournemouth | Away | 2–0 | Andrews, Swailes | 3,247 | |
| 8 January 2008 – 19:45 | Semi-final (South) | Gillingham | Away | 1–1 (Note: MK Dons won 5–4 on penalties.) | Johnson | 3,717 | |
| 19 February 2008 – 19:45 | Area final (South) 1st leg | Swansea City | Away | 1–0 | Johnson | 10,125 | |
| 25 February 2008 – 19:45 | Area final (South) 2nd leg | Swansea City | Home | 0–1 (Note: Aggregate score 1–1. MK Dons won 5–4 on penalties.) | | 9,757 | |
| 30 March 2008 – 13:15 | Final | Grimsby Town | Neutral | 2–0 | Andrews, O'Hanlon | 56,618 | |

== Player details ==
List of squad players, including number of appearances by competition.
Players with squad numbers struck through and marked † left the club during the playing season.

| No. | Pos | Nat | Player | Total | | League Two | | FA Cup | | League Cup | | Other (Note: Includes Football League Trophy and 2006–07 Football League Two play-offs.) | |
| No. | Pos | Nat | Player | Apps | Goals | Apps | Goals | Apps | Goals | Apps | Goals | Apps | Goals |
|---|---|---|---|---|---|---|---|---|---|---|---|---|---|
| ~~1~~ † | GK | (Nigeria) NGA | Ademola Bankole | 0 | 0 | 0 | 0 | 0 | 0 | 0 | 0 | 0 | 0 |
| 2 | DF | (England) ENG | Jude Stirling | 41 | 2 | 34 | 2 | 0 | 0 | 2 | 0 | 5 | 0 |
| 3 | DF | (England) ENG | Dean Lewington | 53 | 0 | 45 | 0 | 1 | 0 | 1 | 0 | 6 | 0 |
| 4 | MF | (Republic of Ireland) IRL | Keith Andrews | 45 | 14 | 41 | 12 | 0 | 0 | 0 | 0 | 4 | 2 |
| 5 | DF | (Guinea) GUI | Drissa Diallo | 35 | 2 | 30 | 2 | 0 | 0 | 1 | 0 | 4 | 0 |
| 6 | DF | (England) ENG | Sean O'Hanlon | 51 | 5 | 43 | 4 | 1 | 0 | 1 | 0 | 6 | 1 |
| ~~7~~ † | MF | (Scotland) SCO | Jon-Paul McGovern | 5 | 1 | 3 | 0 | 0 | 0 | 2 | 1 | 0 | 0 |
| 8 | FW | (England) ENG | Kevin Gallen | 31 | 9 | 24 | 8 | 1 | 0 | 2 | 1 | 4 | 0 |
| ~~9~~ † | FW | (Germany) GER | Felix Bastians | 0 | 0 | 0 | 0 | 0 | 0 | 0 | 0 | 0 | 0 |
| ~~9~~ † | FW | (England) ENG | Leon Knight | 18 | 5 | 17 | 4 | 0 | 0 | 1 | 1 | 0 | 0 |
| 10 | FW | (Scotland) SCO | Colin Cameron | 35 | 4 | 29 | 3 | 1 | 0 | 0 | 0 | 5 | 1 |
| 11 | FW | (England) ENG | Lloyd Dyer | 50 | 11 | 45 | 11 | 0 | 0 | 2 | 0 | 3 | 0 |
| 12 | GK | (France) FRA | Willy Guéret | 52 | 0 | 46 | 0 | 0 | 0 | 0 | 0 | 6 | 0 |
| 13 | MF | (Australia) AUS | Gareth Edds | 11 | 0 | 7 | 0 | 1 | 0 | 2 | 0 | 1 | 0 |
| 14 | FW | (England) ENG | Mark Wright | 41 | 15 | 34 | 13 | 1 | 0 | 2 | 0 | 4 | 2 |
| 15 | FW | (England) ENG | Drewe Broughton | 19 | 1 | 13 | 0 | 1 | 0 | 1 | 1 | 4 | 0 |
| 16 | FW | (England) ENG | Aaron Wilbraham | 40 | 10 | 35 | 10 | 1 | 0 | 2 | 0 | 2 | 0 |
| 17 | DF | (England) ENG | Kieran Murphy | 5 | 0 | 3 | 0 | 0 | 0 | 2 | 0 | 0 | 0 |
| 18 | FW | (England) ENG | John Miles | 12 | 0 | 12 | 0 | 0 | 0 | 0 | 0 | 0 | 0 |
| ~~18~~ † | FW | (England) ENG | Scott Taylor | 2 | 0 | 0 | 0 | 0 | 0 | 0 | 0 | 2 | 0 |
| ~~19~~ † | FW | (England) ENG | John Hastings | 0 | 0 | 0 | 0 | 0 | 0 | 0 | 0 | 0 | 0 |
| 19 | DF | (England) ENG | Carl Regan | 9 | 1 | 9 | 1 | 0 | 0 | 0 | 0 | 0 | 0 |
| 20 | MF | (England) ENG | Alan Navarro | 47 | 3 | 39 | 3 | 1 | 0 | 2 | 0 | 5 | 0 |
| 21 | MF | (England) ENG | Luke Howell | 11 | 0 | 8 | 0 | 0 | 0 | 1 | 0 | 2 | 0 |
| ~~22~~ † | MF | (England) ENG | Jake Livermore | 5 | 0 | 5 | 0 | 0 | 0 | 0 | 0 | 0 | 0 |
| ~~22~~ † | MF | (South Africa) RSA | Bally Smart | 11 | 0 | 8 | 0 | 1 | 0 | 0 | 0 | 2 | 0 |
| 23 | FW | (United States) USA | Jemal Johnson | 46 | 8 | 39 | 5 | 1 | 1 | 0 | 0 | 6 | 2 |
| 24 | DF | (England) ENG | Matt Carbon | 4 | 0 | 3 | 0 | 0 | 0 | 0 | 0 | 1 | 0 |
| 25 | DF | (England) ENG | Danny Swailes | 47 | 5 | 40 | 4 | 1 | 0 | 1 | 0 | 5 | 1 |
| ~~26~~ † | DF | (England) ENG | Sam Page | 0 | 0 | 0 | 0 | 0 | 0 | 0 | 0 | 0 | 0 |
| 27 | DF | (England) ENG | Sam Collins | 0 | 0 | 0 | 0 | 0 | 0 | 0 | 0 | 0 | 0 |
| 28 | MF | (Scotland) SCO | Liam Kelly | 0 | 0 | 0 | 0 | 0 | 0 | 0 | 0 | 0 | 0 |
| 29 | GK | (England) ENG | Nathan Abbey | 3 | 0 | 0 | 0 | 1 | 0 | 2 | 0 | 0 | 0 |
| 30 | MF | (The Gambia) GAM | Mustapha Carayol | 2 | 0 | 0 | 0 | 0 | 0 | 1 | 0 | 1 | 0 |
| 31 | GK | (England) ENG | Laurie Walker | 0 | 0 | 0 | 0 | 0 | 0 | 0 | 0 | 0 | 0 |
| 32 | MF | (England) ENG | Jordan Hadfield | 13 | 0 | 13 | 0 | 0 | 0 | 0 | 0 | 0 | 0 |
| 35 | DF | (England) ENG | Adam Chicksen | 0 | 0 | 0 | 0 | 0 | 0 | 0 | 0 | 0 | 0 |
| 36 | FW | (England) ENG | Sam Baldock | 9 | 0 | 5 | 0 | 1 | 0 | 0 | 0 | 3 | 0 |

== Transfers ==
=== Transfers in ===
| Date from | Position | Name | From | Fee | Ref. |
|---|---|---|---|---|---|
| 5 July 2007 | FW | (England) Kevin Gallen | Free agent (Note: Previous club: Chester City.) | Free transfer | |
| 11 July 2007 | MF | (England) Mark Wright | Free agent (Note: Previous club: Walsall.) | Free transfer | |
| 25 July 2007 | FW | (England) Drewe Broughton | Free agent (Note: Previous club: Chester City.) | Free transfer | |
| 1 August 2007 | MF | (Scotland) Colin Cameron | Free agent (Note: Previous club: Coventry City.) | Free transfer | |
| 3 August 2007 | FW | (The Gambia) Mustapha Carayol | Free agent (Note: Previous club: Macclesfield Town.) | Free transfer | |
| 10 August 2007 | GK | (England) Nathan Abbey | Free agent (Note: Previous club: Brentford.) | Free transfer | |
| 10 August 2007 | MF | (England) Alan Navarro | Free agent (Note: Previous club: Macclesfield Town.) | Free transfer | |
| 11 August 2007 | GK | (France) Willy Guéret | Free agent (Note: Previous club: Swansea City.) | Free transfer | |
| 11 August 2007 | DF | (England) Luke Howell | Free agent (Note: Previous club: Gillingham.) | Free transfer | |
| 19 August 2007 | DF | (England) Danny Swailes | Macclesfield Town | Undisclosed | |
| 31 August 2007 | FW | (United States) Jemal Johnson | Wolverhampton Wanderers | Undisclosed | |
| 4 December 2007 | DF | (England) Matt Carbon | Free agent (Note: Previous club: New Zealand Knights.) | Free transfer | |
| 1 February 2008 | DF | (England) Carl Regan | Macclesfield Town | Undisclosed | |
| 1 February 2008 | MF | (Jamaica) Craig Dobson | Stevenage Borough | Undisclosed | |

=== Transfers out ===
| Date from | Position | Name | To | Fee | Ref. |
|---|---|---|---|---|---|
| 1 July 2007 | MF | (England) Ben Harding | Released (Note: Joined Aldershot Town on 6 August 2007.) | | |
| 1 July 2007 | MF | (England) Gary Smith | Released (Note: Joined Brentford on 1 August 2007.) | | |
| 3 July 2007 | FW | (England) Clive Platt | Colchester United | £300,000 | |
| 9 August 2007 | FW | (England) Izale McLeod | Charlton Athletic | £1,100,000 | |
| 31 August 2007 | MF | (Scotland) Jon-Paul McGovern | Swindon Town | Undisclosed | |

=== Loans in ===
| Start date | Position | Name | From | End date | Ref. |
|---|---|---|---|---|---|
| 15 November 2007 | MF | (England) Jordan Hadfield | Macclesfield Town | End of season (Note: Originally one month loan, extended until end of season.) | |
| 25 January 2008 | FW | (England) John Miles | Accrington Stanley | End of season | |

=== Loans out ===
| Start date | Position | Name | To | End date | Ref. |
|---|---|---|---|---|---|
| 18 September 2007 | MF | (England) John Hastings | Ebbsfleet United | 18 October 2007 | |
| 28 September 2007 | FW | (England) Sam Collins | Kettering Town | Unknown | |
| 15 October 2007 | DF | (England) Sam Page | Hendon | 15 December 2007 | |
| 18 October 2007 | FW | (England) Scott Taylor | Rochdale | 18 November 2007 | |
| 26 October 2007 | FW | (The Gambia) Mustapha Carayol | Crawley Town | End of season | |
| 16 November 2007 | DF | (England) Kieran Murphy | Crawley Town | End of season | |
| 20 November 2007 | MF | (England) John Hastings | Maidenhead United | Unknown | |
| 22 November 2007 | FW | (England) Sam Collins | Hendon | Unknown | |
| 25 January 2008 | FW | (England) Drewe Broughton | (Wales) Wrexham | April 2008 | |
