= James Waite =

James Waite may refer to:

- James Waite (footballer, born 1999), Welsh football midfielder
- Jamie Waite (born 1986), Thai football goalkeeper
- Jimmy Waite (born 1969), Canadian ice hockey coach and goaltender
