= Joe Howe =

Joe Howe may refer to:

- Joseph Howe (1804–1873), Nova Scotian journalist, politician and public servant
- Joe Howe (footballer) (born 1988), English footballer
- Joe Howe (ice hockey)
