= Alan Navarro =

English footballer (born 1981)

Personal information
- Full name: Alan Edward Navarro
- Date of birth: 31 May 1981 (age 45)
- Place of birth: Liverpool, England
- Height: 5 ft 10 in (1.78 m)
- Position: Midfielder

Youth career
- Liverpool

Senior career*
Years	Team	Apps	(Gls)
2000–2002	Liverpool	0	(0)
2001	→ Crewe Alexandra (loan)	8	(1)
2001	→ Crewe Alexandra (loan)	7	(0)
2001–2002	→ Tranmere Rovers (loan)	2	(1)
2002–2005	Tranmere Rovers	44	(0)
2004	→ Chester City (loan)	3	(0)
2004–2005	→ Macclesfield Town (loan)	11	(1)
2005	Accrington Stanley	3	(0)
2005–2007	Macclesfield Town	59	(2)
2007–2009	Milton Keynes Dons	78	(4)
2009–2012	Brighton & Hove Albion	73	(1)
2012–2014	Swindon Town	17	(0)
Total		305	(10)
- * Club domestic league appearances and goals

Alan Edward Navarro (born 31 May 1981) is an English former professional footballer who played as a midfielder.

Having come through the youth academy at Liverpool, he most notably played in the Football League with Tranmere Rovers, Macclesfield Town, Milton Keynes Dons and Brighton & Hove Albion. He also had spells with Crewe Alexandra, Chester City, Accrington Stanley and Swindon Town

== Club career ==
=== Early career ===
Born in Liverpool, Merseyside, Navarro started his career at hometown club Liverpool, coming through the youth system before signing a professional contract with the club in the summer of 2000. On 22 March 2001, Navarro joined Crewe Alexandra on loan for six weeks, making eight appearances and scoring one goal.

=== Tranmere Rovers ===
On 9 November 2001, Navarro joined Tranmere Rovers on an initial two-month loan deal where he made two league appearances, scoring one goal. Liverpool also allowed Navarro to compete in the FA Cup whilst at Tranmere. It was in the FA Cup in which Navarro scored on his debut for the club in a 4–1 win over Brigg Town.

On 23 January 2002, Navarro joined Tranmere permanently on a three-and-a-half-year contract. Whilst at Tranmere, Navarro was loaned out twice, first joining Chester City for a month on 20 August 2004 before completing a three-month spell at Macclesfield Town which began on 15 December 2004. Navarro made 11 loan appearances for the club and scored one goal. On 12 May 2005, Navarro had his contract with Tranmere cancelled by mutual consent.

=== Macclesfield Town ===
On 12 September 2005, Navarro joined Conference National team Accrington Stanley on non-contract terms after a successful trial with the club. However, after three substitute appearances for Accrington Navarro joined previous loan club Macclesfield on 11 October 2005 on a permanent transfer.

=== Milton Keynes Dons ===
On 1 August 2007, Navarro joined Milton Keynes Dons (MK Dons) on an initial one-year contract. He signed a one-year contract extension at MK Dons on 11 December 2007. After making 77 league appearances and scoring two goals over two seasons at Milton Keynes, Navarro was released from his contract on 19 May 2009.

=== Brighton & Hove Albion ===
Navarro joined Brighton & Hove Albion on trial during the summer of 2009 with a view to earning a professional contract. Navarro started during the 2–0 pre-season friendly victory over AFC Wimbledon and was praised by manager Russell Slade for a good performance. Navarro also started during the 2–0 pre-season friendly victory at Scunthorpe United before signing a two-year contract with the League One club.

In May 2011, Brighton announced that he would not be issued a new deal following the ending of his current contract, but would be invited back to pre-season training to prove he is worth a new contract after an injury-hit season. He earned a one-year contract, and featured in 33 league games during the 2011–12 season, scoring his first goal for Brighton in a 2–1 win against Leeds United at Elland Road in the 90th minute on 11 February 2012. Navarro was released following the expiration of his contract at the end of April 2012.

=== Swindon Town ===
In June 2012 Navarro signed for Swindon Town on a free transfer. On his debut for Swindon he scored two goals to knock his former club Brighton out of the League Cup.

== Career statistics ==
As of 19 November 2018

Club	Season	League			FA Cup		League Cup		Other		Total	
Club	Season	Division	Apps	Goals	Apps	Goals	Apps	Goals	Apps	Goals	Apps	Goals
Crewe Alexandra (loan)	2000–01	First Division	8	1	0	0	0	0	—		8	1
Crewe Alexandra (loan)	2001–02	First Division	7	0	0	0	2	0	—		9	0
Crewe Alexandra (loan)	Total		15	1	0	0	2	0	—		17	1
Tranmere Rovers (loan)	2001–02	Second Division	2	1	2	1	0	0	0	0	4	2
Tranmere Rovers	2001–02	Second Division	19	0	1	0	0	0	0	0	20	0
Tranmere Rovers	2002–03	Second Division	5	0	0	0	0	0	0	0	5	0
Tranmere Rovers	2003–04	Second Division	20	0	3	0	0	0	0	0	23	0
Tranmere Rovers	Total		46	1	6	1	0	0	0	0	52	2
Chester City (loan)	2004–05	League Two	3	0	0	0	1	0	0	0	4	0
Macclesfield Town (loan)	2004–05	League Two	11	1	0	0	—		0	0	11	1
Accrington Stanley	2005–06	Conference	3	0	0	0	—		—		3	0
Macclesfield Town	2005–06	League Two	27	0	2	0	0	0	4	0	33	0
Macclesfield Town	2006–07	League Two	32	2	4	0	1	0	1	0	38	2
Macclesfield Town	Total		59	2	6	0	1	0	5	0	71	2
Milton Keynes Dons	2007–08	League Two	39	3	1	0	2	0	5	0	47	3
Milton Keynes Dons	2008–09	League One	39	1	1	0	1	0	1	0	42	1
Milton Keynes Dons	Total		78	4	2	0	3	0	6	0	89	4
Brighton & Hove Albion	2009–10	League One	36	0	3	0	1	0	1	0	41	0
Brighton & Hove Albion	2010–11	League One	4	0	0	0	1	0	0	0	5	0
Brighton & Hove Albion	2011–12	Championship	33	1	4	0	2	0	—		39	1
Brighton & Hove Albion	Total		73	1	7	0	4	0	1	0	85	1
Swindon Town	2012–13	League One	17	0	0	0	3	2	0	0	20	2
Career total			305	10	21	1	14	2	12	0	352	13

== Honours ==
Milton Keynes Dons

- Football League Two: 2007–08
- Football League Trophy: 2007–08
