= Keith Andrews (footballer) =

Irish footballer (born 1980)

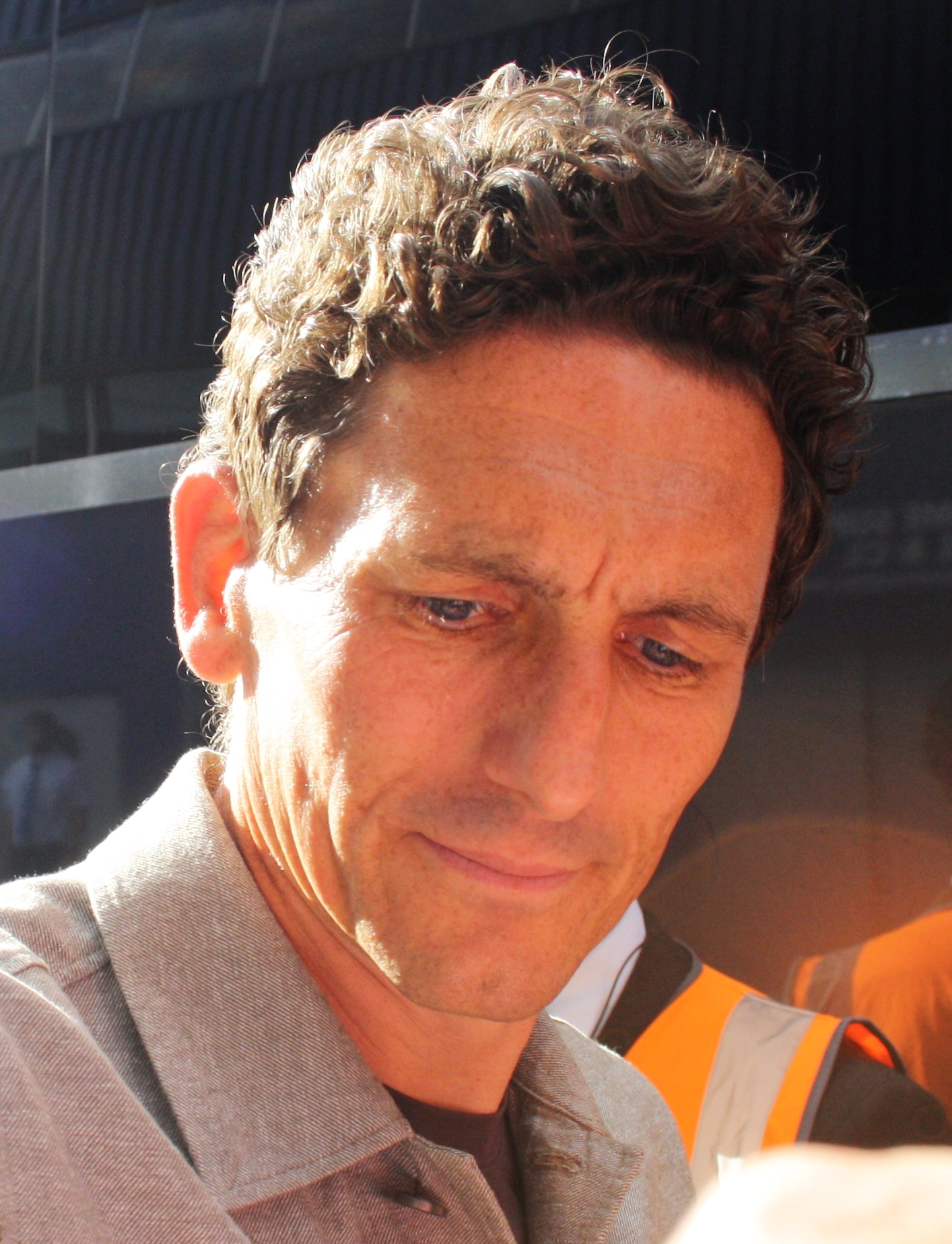
- Andrews as Brentford head coach in 2025

Personal information
- Full name: Keith Joseph Andrews
- Date of birth: 13 September 1980 (age 46)
- Place of birth: Artane, Dublin, Ireland
- Height: 1.83 m (6 ft 0 in)
- Position: Defensive midfielder

Team information
- Current team: Brentford (head coach)

Youth career
- 1997–1999: Stella Maris

Senior career*
| Years | Team | Apps | (Gls) |
| 1999–2005 | Wolverhampton Wanderers | 65 | (0) |
| 2000 | → Oxford United (loan) | 4 | (1) |
| 2003 | → Stoke City (loan) | 16 | (0) |
| 2004 | → Walsall (loan) | 10 | (2) |
| 2005–2006 | Hull City | 29 | (0) |
| 2006–2008 | Milton Keynes Dons | 76 | (19) |
| 2008–2012 | Blackburn Rovers | 70 | (5) |
| 2011 | → Ipswich Town (loan) | 20 | (9) |
| 2012 | West Bromwich Albion | 14 | (2) |
| 2012–2015 | Bolton Wanderers | 26 | (4) |
| 2013–2014 | → Brighton & Hove Albion (loan) | 31 | (1) |
| 2014–2015 | → Watford (loan) | 9 | (1) |
| 2015 | → Milton Keynes Dons (loan) | 5 | (0) |
| Total | | 375 | (44) |

International career
| 1996 | Republic of Ireland U17 | 1 | (0) |
| 2008–2012 | Republic of Ireland | 35 | (3) |

Managerial career
- 2025–: Brentford
- * Club domestic league appearances and goals

Keith Joseph Andrews (born 13 September 1980) is an Irish football coach and former player who played as a defensive midfielder. He is the head coach of Premier League club Brentford.

Andrews began his career at Wolverhampton Wanderers, where he was their youngest captain in over a century. His club career also involved stints at Hull City and Milton Keynes Dons, as well as loan spells at Oxford United, Stoke City and Walsall while he was at Wolves. While at Milton Keynes Dons he was club captain, and helped secure promotion with a vital goal, helped win the Football League Trophy by scoring in the final at Wembley and was named in the PFA Team of the Year.

He joined Blackburn Rovers in September 2008 and spent three seasons at Ewood Park which included a loan spell at Ipswich Town. After a short stay with West Bromwich Albion Andrews joined Bolton Wanderers and after loans at Brighton & Hove Albion, Watford and a return to Milton Keynes Dons he retired in the summer of 2015.

A full international from 2008 to 2012, Andrews gained 35 caps for the Republic of Ireland and was selected for UEFA Euro 2012.

== Club career ==
=== Youth career ===
Originally from Artane, Andrews was a youth player with Stella Maris, in a team featuring fellow future professionals Joe Murphy and Richie Partridge.

=== Wolverhampton Wanderers ===
Andrews began his career as a trainee at Wolves, progressing from their academy to the second team. He made his senior debut on 18 March 2000 in a 2–1 win at Swindon. He continued his progress with the First Division club in the 2000–01 season, becoming a regular player as Dave Jones took over midway through. He went on a loan spell at Oxford United, scoring once against Swansea City. Back at Wolves, the final match of that season saw him become their youngest captain for more than a hundred years, at 21 years old, in a game against Queens Park Rangers.

He signed a new four-year deal the following season but found himself out of the starting line-up after several new midfielders were acquired in the summer, resigning him to the substitutes bench and sporadic appearances over the next few seasons. To gain playing time, he spent half of the 2003–04 season on loan at Stoke City and the latter half at Walsall, where he scored two league goals against Millwall and Ipswich Town. He did however return to Molineux in between to make his only Premier League appearance for Wolves (against Newcastle United).

The midfielder returned to Wolves' team post-relegation in 2004–05 and gained his most appearances for the club during that season. However, he moved on at the end of his contract to join Hull City. In total, he made 72 appearances for the Midlanders, scoring once in a League Cup tie at Rochdale.

=== Hull City ===
His new start with Hull saw him sidelined again though, as he picked up an injury in only his second appearance for the team – in a match against his previous team, Wolves. He returned to the team in December after nearly four months out and featured in all but one of their remaining fixtures in what proved to be his only season for the club.

=== Milton Keynes Dons ===
After a single year at Hull City, he moved to Milton Keynes Dons of League Two for the 2006–07 campaign where he became club captain. He lost out on promotion in the play-offs, despite scoring in the semi-final tie with Shrewsbury Town.

However, the next year, now under the management of his former Wolves teammate Paul Ince, brought Andrews success. He scored the winning goal in a match at Stockport County on 19 April 2008 that saw the club promoted to League One, and also scored the opening goal of their 2–0 victory over Grimsby Town with a penalty in the Football League Trophy at Wembley. The season ended with him being voted into PFA Team of the Year and having already won the League Two Player of the Year Award at the Football League Awards. Andrews was then named at number 38 in a FourFourTwo poll of the top 50 football league players, as well as being named the best player in League 2. MK Dons then had a fight on their hands to keep hold of their inspirational skipper with interest from a number of Premiership and Championship clubs. He featured in MK Dons's first three games of the 2008–09 season but then was sold to Blackburn Rovers managed by former manager Paul Ince.

=== Blackburn Rovers ===
Andrews ended a summer of speculation over his future when he completed a transfer to Premier League club Blackburn Rovers on 3 September 2008 in a three-year deal worth and rising up to £1m depending on appearances made for the football club over the coming years. The move temporarily reunited him with his former MK Dons manager Paul Ince before he was sacked as Rovers manager. He made his debut as a substitute on 6 September 2008 against West Ham United, a game in which Blackburn lost 4–1. Andrews made his home debut against Arsenal, on his 28th birthday, Arsenal went on to win the match 4–0. He scored his first goal for Blackburn in the 90th minute during a 2–2 draw with West Bromwich Albion. Due to injuries sustained by first team regulars, Andrews featured frequently for the Rovers first team, occupying a defensive central midfield role. In July 2009, Andrews signed a new four-year deal, which saw him contracted to Blackburn until 2013. On 25 September 2010, Andrews came on for Steven Nzonzi on 66 minutes against Blackpool at Bloomfield Road in a 2–1 win for his first game of the 2010–11 campaign. The 2010–11 season was a frustrating one for Andrews as he only made six appearances in all competitions for Rovers due to injury.

==== Ipswich Town (loan) ====
Andrews agreed to a six-month loan move to Ipswich Town on 12 August 2011. This loan includes an option to buy the player permanently. A day later he made his debut in a 1–0 loss to Hull City and then 3 days later his first goal came against Southampton. This was followed by goals against Peterborough United and Leeds United. Steve Kean, the head coach of Blackburn Rovers, hinted that Andrews' may return to his parent club in January 2012, after a successful loan spell with Ipswich. This was contrary to Andrews' ambitions, who when responding to reports that Paul Jewell, the Ipswich head coach, wanted to sign him on a permanent deal, stated in an interview with the BBC that, "I don't particularly like the way I was treated at the club [Blackburn]. Not just the manager, the club in general."

=== West Bromwich Albion ===
Andrews completed a late deadline day (31 January 2012) free transfer to Albion, after handing in a transfer request at Blackburn. Andrews signed a six-month contract. On 12 February, Andrews scored his first goal for West Brom and their fourth against former club Wolves in a 5–1 win. Andrews then made it two goals in two appearances as he scored Albion's fourth in a 4–0 victory over Sunderland two weeks later. Andrews then made it three wins in three appearances as he produced another solid performance in the 1–0 win over Chelsea.

Andrews become a free agent as his West Brom contract ended at the end of the season.

=== Bolton Wanderers ===
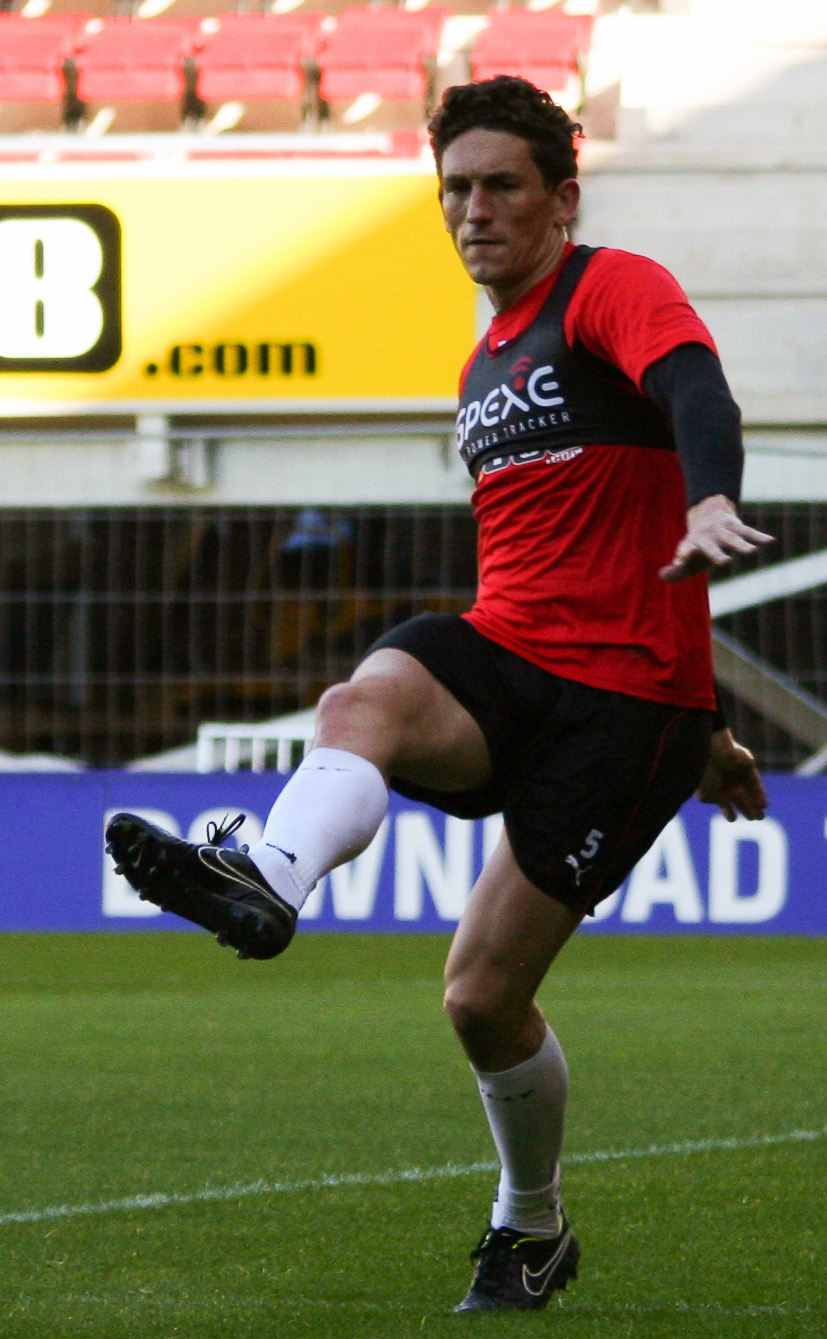
Andrews warming up for Watford in 2014.

Andrews signed for newly relegated Football League Championship club Bolton Wanderers on 29 June 2012 after agreeing a three-year contract. He made his debut on 18 August in the away game at Burnley and on 22 December he scored his first goals for Bolton scoring twice from the penalty spot in their 5–4 defeat against Peterborough United

Following the permanent signing of Jay Spearing, Andrews' first-team place at Bolton was no longer assured. On 9 August 2013, he signed a season-long loan deal at fellow Championship club Brighton & Hove Albion. He scored his first goal for Brighton in a 1–1 draw with Sheffield Wednesday on 1 October.

On 24 July 2014, Andrews completed a move to fellow Championship side Watford, on a season-long loan deal. He made his Watford debut from the start in the League Cup first-round tie at Stevenage on 12 August.

On 2 February 2015, transfer deadline day, Andrews rejoined Milton Keynes Dons on loan for the duration of the season after his loan to Watford was cut short. On 4 August, he retired from professional football to take up a role as their first team coach.

== International career ==
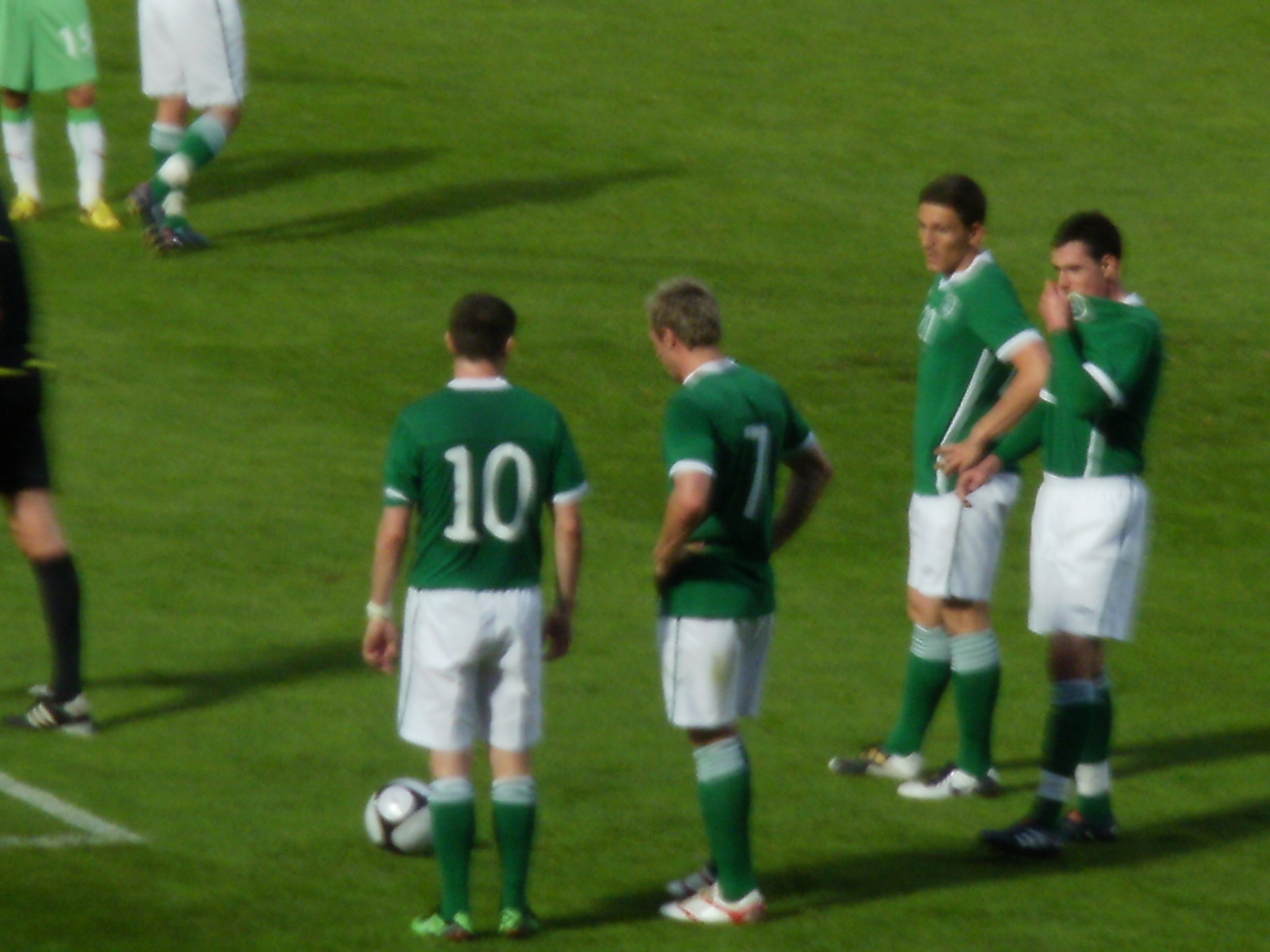
Keith Andrews (number 20) in a 2010 friendly for Ireland against Algeria

Andrews made his debut for the Republic of Ireland on 19 November 2008, coming on as a second-half substitute and scoring a goal as part of a 3–2 home defeat in a friendly match against Poland. He played his first competitive match for Ireland, having a goal disallowed in a 2–1 World Cup qualification group match victory over Georgia.

On 7 June 2011, Andrews scored his second international goal in a 2–0 victory over four-time FIFA World Cup winners Italy in a friendly game in Liège, Belgium. His third international goal was a header, the opening goal of Ireland's 4–0 victory in the first leg of the UEFA Euro 2012 play-off against Estonia in Tallinn. Ireland secured qualification for UEFA Euro 2012 with a 1–1 draw in the second leg in Dublin days later.

=== Euro 2012 ===
On 10 June 2012, in Ireland's first game of Group C against Croatia, Andrews failed to score despite having a number of clear shots on goal and hitting the woodwork; Ireland fell to Croatia by a score of 3–1. In the following game Ireland crashed out of the tournament, losing to Spain by a score of 4–0 on 14 June 2012, before he was led off the field in a rage after receiving a red card in Ireland's final group game against Italy, a game the team lost 2–0. Thus Ireland finished the campaign bottom of Group C with no points, having conceded nine goals and equalling the worst performance by a team in European Championships history. Nevertheless, The Irish Times said he was "arguably Ireland's best performer in the tournament". Andrews was named as Player of the Year for 2012 at the FAI International Football Awards.

== Managerial career ==
Following the end of his playing career, Andrews became assistant manager to Milton Keynes Dons head coach Karl Robinson, departing at the end of the 2015–16 season as the side were relegated. In December 2016, it was announced that Andrews would be coaching in the academy at League of Ireland club St Patrick's Athletic during the 18 months of his UEFA Pro Licence course. He later worked as assistant to Stephen Kenny for both the under-21 and senior Republic of Ireland national team until Kenny's departure in November 2023. He joined the backroom staff at Sheffield United in December 2023 under Chris Wilder, before leaving at the end of the season when he was appointed set piece coach at Brentford.

=== Brentford ===
On 27 June 2025, Andrews was appointed as Brentford's new head coach, replacing long-serving manager Thomas Frank. On 26 February 2026, with the club sitting in seventh and in contention for European football, he extended his contract until 2032.

== Career statistics ==
=== Club ===
Appearances and goals by club, season and competition
| Club | Season | League | | | FA Cup | | League Cup | | Other | | Total | |
| Club | Season | Division | Apps | Goals | Apps | Goals | Apps | Goals | Apps | Goals | Apps | Goals |
|---|---|---|---|---|---|---|---|---|---|---|---|---|
| Wolverhampton Wanderers | 1999–2000 | First Division | 2 | 0 | 0 | 0 | 0 | 0 | – | | 2 | 0 |
| Wolverhampton Wanderers | 2000–01 | First Division | 22 | 0 | 2 | 0 | 0 | 0 | – | | 24 | 0 |
| Wolverhampton Wanderers | 2001–02 | First Division | 11 | 0 | 0 | 0 | 0 | 0 | 0 | 0 | 11 | 0 |
| Wolverhampton Wanderers | 2002–03 | First Division | 9 | 0 | 1 | 0 | 0 | 0 | 0 | 0 | 10 | 0 |
| Wolverhampton Wanderers | 2003–04 | Premier League | 1 | 0 | 1 | 0 | 1 | 0 | – | | 1 | 0 |
| Wolverhampton Wanderers | 2004–05 | Championship | 20 | 0 | 0 | 0 | 2 | 1 | – | | 22 | 1 |
| Wolverhampton Wanderers | Total | | 65 | 0 | 4 | 0 | 3 | 0 | 0 | 0 | 72 | 0 |
| Oxford United (loan) | 2000–01 | Second Division | 4 | 1 | 0 | 0 | 0 | 0 | 1 | 0 | 5 | 1 |
| Stoke City (loan) | 2003–04 | First Division | 16 | 0 | 0 | 0 | 0 | 0 | 0 | 0 | 16 | 0 |
| Walsall (loan) | 2003–04 | First Division | 10 | 2 | 0 | 0 | 0 | 0 | 0 | 0 | 10 | 2 |
| Hull City | 2005–06 | Championship | 26 | 0 | 1 | 0 | 0 | 0 | – | | 27 | 0 |
| Hull City | 2006–07 | Championship | 3 | 0 | 0 | 0 | 0 | 0 | – | | 3 | 0 |
| Hull City | Total | | 29 | 0 | 1 | 0 | 0 | 0 | – | | 30 | 0 |
| Milton Keynes Dons | 2006–07 | League Two | 34 | 7 | 3 | 0 | 1 | 0 | 2 | 1 | 40 | 8 |
| Milton Keynes Dons | 2007–08 | League Two | 41 | 12 | 0 | 0 | 0 | 0 | 4 | 2 | 45 | 14 |
| Milton Keynes Dons | 2008–09 | League One | 1 | 0 | 0 | 0 | 1 | 0 | 0 | 0 | 2 | 0 |
| Milton Keynes Dons | Total | | 76 | 19 | 3 | 0 | 2 | 0 | 6 | 3 | 87 | 22 |
| Blackburn Rovers | 2008–09 | Premier League | 33 | 4 | 2 | 0 | 0 | 0 | – | | 35 | 4 |
| Blackburn Rovers | 2009–10 | Premier League | 32 | 1 | 0 | 0 | 3 | 0 | – | | 35 | 1 |
| Blackburn Rovers | 2010–11 | Premier League | 5 | 0 | 1 | 0 | 0 | 0 | – | | 6 | 0 |
| Blackburn Rovers | Total | | 70 | 5 | 3 | 0 | 3 | 0 | – | | 76 | 5 |
| Ipswich Town (loan) | 2011–12 | Championship | 20 | 9 | 0 | 0 | 0 | 0 | – | | 20 | 9 |
| West Bromwich Albion | 2011–12 | Premier League | 14 | 2 | 0 | 0 | 0 | 0 | – | | 14 | 2 |
| Bolton Wanderers | 2012–13 | Championship | 25 | 4 | 1 | 0 | 1 | 0 | – | | 27 | 4 |
| Bolton Wanderers | 2013–14 | Championship | 1 | 0 | 0 | 0 | 1 | 0 | – | | 2 | 0 |
| Bolton Wanderers | Total | | 26 | 4 | 1 | 0 | 2 | 0 | – | | 29 | 4 |
| Brighton & Hove Albion (loan) | 2013–14 | Championship | 31 | 1 | 4 | 0 | 0 | 0 | – | | 35 | 1 |
| Watford (loan) | 2014–15 | Championship | 9 | 1 | 0 | 0 | 2 | 0 | – | | 11 | 1 |
| Milton Keynes Dons (loan) | 2014–15 | League One | 5 | 0 | 0 | 0 | 0 | 0 | – | | 5 | 0 |
| Career total | | | 375 | 44 | 16 | 0 | 12 | 1 | 7 | 3 | 413 | 49 |

=== International ===
Appearances and goals by national team and year
| National team | Year | Apps | Goals |
|---|---|---|---|
| Republic of Ireland | 2008 | 1 | 1 |
| Republic of Ireland | 2009 | 11 | 0 |
| Republic of Ireland | 2010 | 4 | 0 |
| Republic of Ireland | 2011 | 10 | 2 |
| Republic of Ireland | 2012 | 9 | 0 |
| Total | | 35 | 3 |

Scores and results list the Republic of Ireland's goal tally first, score column indicates score after each Andrews goal.

List of international goals scored by Keith Andrews
| No. | Date | Venue | Opponent | Score | Result | Competition |
|---|---|---|---|---|---|---|
| 1 | 19 November 2008 | Croke Park, Dublin, Ireland | Poland | 2–3 | 2–3 | Friendly |
| 2 | 7 June 2011 | Stade Maurice Dufrasne, Liège, Belgium | Italy | 1–0 | 2–0 | Friendly |
| 3 | 11 November 2011 | A. Le Coq Arena, Tallinn, Estonia | Estonia | 1–0 | 4–0 | UEFA Euro 2012 qualifying play-offs |

== Managerial statistics ==
As of match played 8 November 2026

Managerial record by team and tenure
| Team | From | To | Record | | | | |
| Team | From | To | P | W | D | L | Win % |
|---|---|---|---|---|---|---|---|
| Brentford | 27 June 2025 | Present | 58 | 23 | 18 | 17 | 39.7 |
| Total | | | 58 | 23 | 18 | 17 | 39.7 |

== Honours ==
Milton Keynes Dons

- Football League Two: 2007–08
- Football League Trophy: 2007–08
- Football League One runner-up: 2014–15

Republic of Ireland

- Nations Cup: 2011

Individual

- PFA Team of the Year: 2007–08 League Two
- Milton Keynes Dons Player of the Year: 2007–08
- Football League Two Player of the Year: 2008
- FourFourTwo 50 Best Football League Players 2008: 38th
- FAI Senior International Player of the Year: 2012
