= List of Milton Keynes Dons F.C. managers =

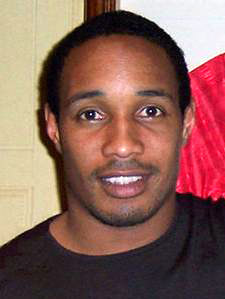
Paul Ince, pictured in 2006, managed the club over two spells between 2007 and 2010.

The first Milton Keynes Dons F.C. manager was Stuart Murdoch, who had previously been manager of Wimbledon. Murdoch only lasted three months into the 2004–05 season before being sacked — his assistant, Jimmy Gilligan, managed the club for a month before Murdoch's replacement was revealed to be Danny Wilson. Wilson managed to keep the team up during the 2004–05 season, but failed to repeat this feat during 2005–06. Following relegation, Wilson was shown the door and replaced with Martin Allen. After Allen's team fell at the play-offs, he left to manage Leicester City. Paul Ince was appointed manager for the 2007–08 season, and proved to be a shrewd appointment as MK Dons won the League Two championship as well as the Football League Trophy. Ince too left after only a season, to become manager of Blackburn Rovers.

Former Chelsea player Roberto di Matteo was then appointed in July 2008, his personal first ever managerial position. Di Matteo was the first, and so far only, foreign manager of the club. He left after a season to manage West Bromwich Albion. Ince was reappointed in his stead on 3 July 2009. Paul Ince resigned as manager on 16 April 2010, stating "a reduction in funds for next season was the reason behind his decision to leave", Karl Robinson was appointed as Caretaker Manager, although Ince remained with the club until the end of the 2009–10 season.

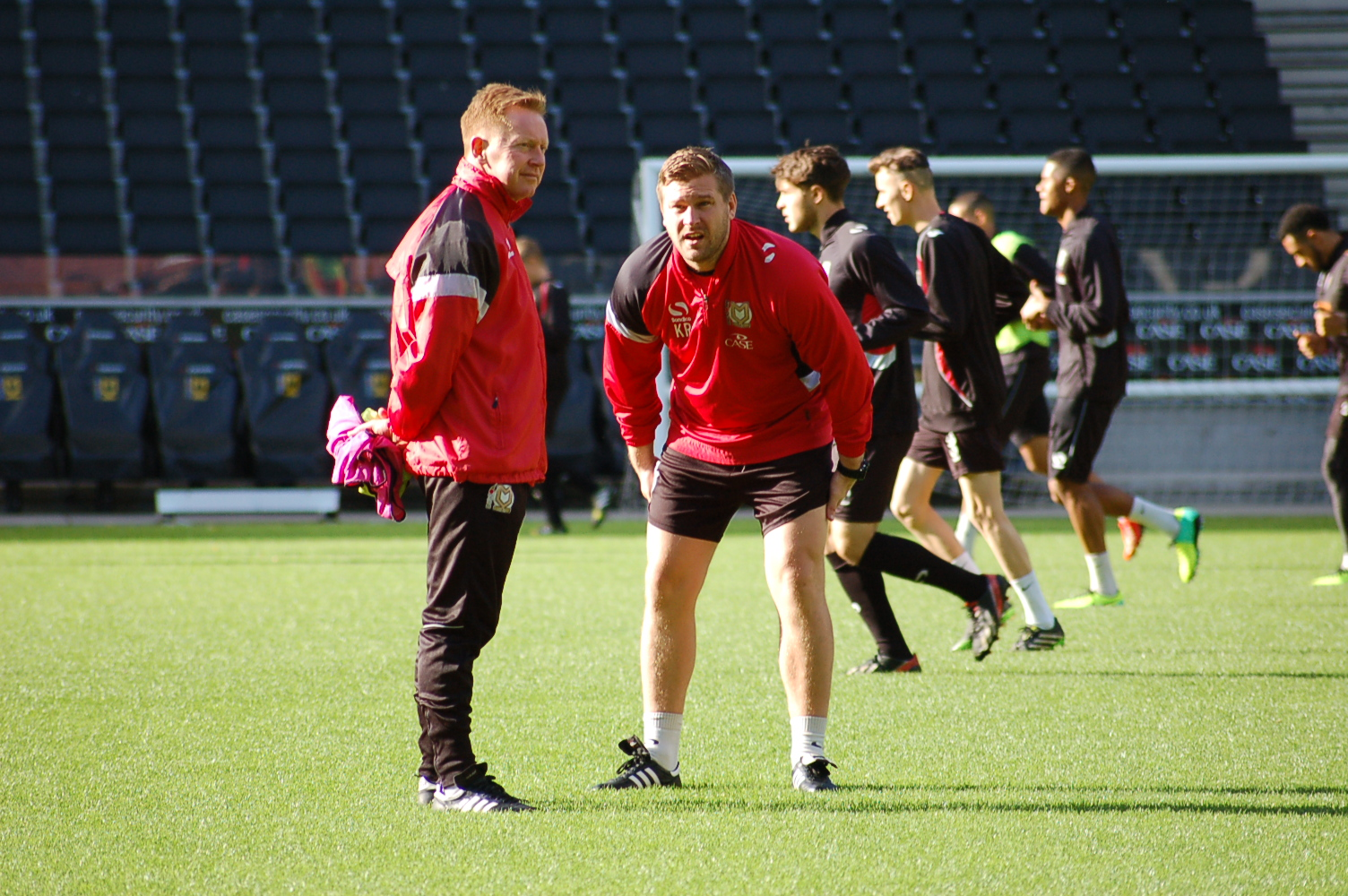
Karl Robinson (R) and head of coaching Gary Waddock (L), pictured in 2013. Robinson held the longest tenure of any MK Dons manager, in charge from 2010 through 2016.

Karl Robinson was appointed manager on 10 May 2010, having previously been the club's assistant manager under previous boss Paul Ince. At 29 years of age, he was the youngest manager in the Football League, and former England coach John Gorman was named his number two. He was also the youngest person to ever acquire a UEFA Pro Licence at the age of 29. At the end of the 2011–12 season Gorman retired and was replaced by former Luton Town player/manager Mick Harford. At the same time, ex-Arsenal and former England international Ian Wright was also enlisted in a part-time role to provide assistance with coaching duties.

In January 2013, Robinson turned down an offer to manage Blackpool, a well established Championship and former Premier League team, in favour of his continuing commitment and loyalty towards Milton Keynes Dons, something which endeared him to the fans of the club. Robinson was linked to other former Premier League clubs including Birmingham City, Sheffield United and Leeds United, and eventually managed Charlton Athletic in 2016–18 after leaving Milton Keynes before moving on to Oxford United.

After Robinson's departure, Richie Barker acted as caretaker manager for just under six weeks before former Hearts manager Robbie Neilson announced his move to the club. Neilson was at the club for just over one year before he left by mutual consent in January 2018 after a disappointing run of one win in 11 league games. Former England youth coach Dan Micciche took over as manager, lasting a spell of three months in the job before leaving, being temporarily replaced by his assistant Keith Millen.

June 2018 saw the appointment of former Exeter City boss Paul Tisdale, tasked with turning around the Dons after their relegation to League Two. Tisdale began his League Two campaign with a near-perfect month, gaining 16 points from a possible 18, conceding just two goals. Tisdale led MK Dons to a third-place finish, gaining automatic promotion back to League One on the first attempt.

Following a poor start to the 2019–20 season in which Milton Keynes Dons achieved only one point from a possible 27 - the worst run of results in the club's short history - Tisdale's contract with the club was mutually terminated on 2 November 2019 following a 1–3 home defeat to Tranmere Rovers. The next day it was announced that MK Dons player Russell Martin would take on the managerial role with immediate effect, and later announced his retirement as a player to focus on the role.

On 1 August 2021, it was announced that Russell Martin had departed Stadiummk, to fill the vacant head coach position at EFL Championship outfit Swansea City A.F.C. agreeing terms on a 3-year deal to move to South Wales, with the Buckinghamshire side confirming the news via their website. Dean Lewington took charge temporarily, overseeing the first two league games of the 2021–22 season.

On Friday 13 August 2021, MK Dons announced that former Lommel SK manager Liam Manning had been officially appointed as the Football Club's new head coach. Liam guided the Dons to a 3rd-place finish in EFL League One that season, losing 2–1 on aggregate to Wycombe Wanderers in the play off semi final.

After only picking up 5 wins from the first 20 league games in the following season, MK Dons parted company with Liam Manning on 11 December 2022. Dean Lewington again took temporary charge of the team until a new head coach was announced.

On Friday 23 December 2022, Mark Jackson was announced as the new Milton Keynes Dons head coach. After managing only 6 wins from 25 league games, MK Dons were relegated on the final day of the 2022–23 season following a 0–0 draw with Burton because Cambridge United beat Forest Green Rovers 2–0 to lift themselves out of the relegation zone. Jackson was sacked 2 days later.

On Saturday 27 May 2023, Graham Alexander was announced to be taking over as head coach. After the first 5 games of the season, The Dons were sitting top of League Two with Alexander winning EFL League Two Manager of the Month. Then came a terrible run of games not winning any of the next 8 in charge, Alexander was sacked by MK Dons leaving the club 16th in League Two.

Mike Williamson was appointed MK Dons manager. 1 day later on the 17th October. Williamson lead MK Dons back into the play off positions, finishing the season in 4th place, but a catastrophic 2 legs against Crawley Town left MK Dons losing the tie 8-1 on aggregate.

After a terrible start to the following season with 4 losses and 2 wins, Williamson jumped before he was pushed, on 19 September 2024 to take up the role of head coach at Carlisle Utd. Leaving the Dons 20th in League Two.

Dean Lewington filled in again as Interim head coach for 1 game, a 1-1 draw with Doncaster Rovers before the club then hired Scott Lindsey from last seasons play off winners Crawley Town. With Lindsey as head coach, The Dons enjoyed an early good run of results, winning 6 league games in a row from October to December, climbing to 3rd in the league, before plummeting down the table and winning another 2 games before he was sacked on the 2nd March following a 1-0 loss to Colchester United at home.

Gladwin was appointed Interim Head Coach for 9 games.

Paul Warne was appointed on the 15th April, winning 1 and drawing the other 3 remaining games of the 2024-25 season. In his first full season in charge at Milton Keynes Dons, Warne saw his team to a promotion back to League One after 3 seasons away.

== List of managers ==
Statistics are correct as of 29 April 2026.

Name	Nationality	From	To	Matches	Won	Drawn	Lost	Win %	Notes
Stuart Murdoch	Scotland	7 August 2004	8 November 2004	21	5	5	11	23.81	(Note: Stuart Murdoch was the manager of Wimbledon before the club was renamed in 2004. The date of Milton Keynes Dons's first league match, 7 August 2004, was agreed in 2006 to be the date on which Murdoch ceased to manage Wimbledon and began to manage Milton Keynes Dons.)
Jimmy Gilligan	England	8 November 2004	7 December 2004	4	2	0	2	50.00	Caretaker
Danny Wilson	Northern Ireland	7 December 2004	21 June 2006	81	25	32	24	30.86	
Martin Allen	England	21 June 2006	25 May 2007	46	25	9	12	54.35	
Paul Ince	England	25 June 2007	21 June 2008	55	35	11	9	63.64	
Roberto di Matteo	Italy	3 July 2008	30 June 2009	41	22	7	12	53.66	
Paul Ince	England	3 July 2009	10 May 2010	44	22	4	18	50.00	
Karl Robinson	England	10 May 2010	23 October 2016	346	147	81	118	42.49	
Richie Barker	England	23 October 2016	3 December 2016	8	2	3	3	25.00	Caretaker
Robbie Neilson	Scotland	3 December 2016	20 January 2018	66	26	16	24	39.39	
Dan Micciche	England	23 January 2018	22 April 2018	16	3	3	10	18.75	
Keith Millen	England	22 April 2018	6 June 2018	3	1	0	2	33.33	Caretaker
Paul Tisdale	England	6 June 2018	3 November 2019	73	31	13	29	42.47	
Russell Martin	Scotland	3 November 2019	1 August 2021	80	30	19	31	37.50	
Dean Lewington	England	1 August 2021	13 August 2021	1	0	1	0	0.00	Interim
Liam Manning	England	13 August 2021	11 December 2022	83	40	15	28	48.19	Head Coach
Dean Lewington	England	11 December 2022	23 December 2022	2	1	0	1	50.00	Interim
Bradley Johnson	England	20 December 2022	20 December 2022	1	0	0	1	0.00	Interim
Mark Jackson	England	23 December 2022	9 May 2023	25	6	9	10	24.00	Head Coach
Graham Alexander	Scotland	27 May 2023	16 October 2023	16	6	4	6	37.50	Head Coach
Mike Williamson	England	17 October 2023	19 September 2024	45	22	5	18	48.89	Head Coach
Dean Lewington	England	20 September 2024	25 September 2024	1	0	1	0	0.00	Interim
Scott Lindsey	England	25 September 2024	2 March 2025	29	9	6	14	31.03	Head Coach
Ben Gladwin	England	3 March 2025	15 April 2025	9	2	1	6	22.22	Interim
Paul Warne	England	15 April 2025	Present	53	27	17	9	50.94	Head Coach

== Records ==
=== Nationalities ===
As of 29 April 2026 (including caretakers & head coaches)

- (England) English (17)
- (Scotland) Scottish (4)
- (Italy) Italian (1)
- (Northern Ireland) Northern Irish (1)
