= Joe Howe (footballer) =

English footballer

Personal information
- Full name: Joe David William Howe
- Date of birth: 21 January 1988 (age 38)
- Place of birth: Sidcup, England
- Position: Defender

Team information
- Current team: Biggleswade Town

Youth career
- Milton Keynes Dons

Senior career*
Years	Team	Apps	(Gls)
2006–2007	Milton Keynes Dons	3	(0)
2006	→ Walton & Hersham (loan)	5	(0)
2007	→ Gravesend & Northfleet (loan)	1	(0)
2007	Northampton Town	0	(0)
2007	Kettering Town	7	(0)
2007–2008	Welling United	20	(0)
2008–2009	Fisher Athletic	21	(1)
2009–2010	Croydon Athletic	75	(2)
2010–2016	Ebbsfleet United	236	(6)
2016	Bromley	10	(0)
2016–2017	Leatherhead	24	(0)
2017–2019	Hemel Hempstead Town	71	(4)
2019–	St Albans City	13	(0)
2019–2020	→ Hendon (loan)	12	(0)
- * Club domestic league appearances and goals as of 13:43, 2 April 2020 (UTC)

Joe Howe (born 21 January 1988) is an English footballer who is Assistant Manager and plays for Biggleswade Town.

== Club career ==
Howe was born in Sidcup, Kent. He started his career in the academy at Milton Keynes Dons and was handed his first professional contract in the summer of 2006. Howe made his first-team debut in the starting eleven for the League Cup victory against Colchester United on 22 August 2006. He spent time on loan at Walton & Hersham to gain experience, and made another appearance for MK Dons, this time in the Football League Trophy. Howe left for Gravesend & Northfleet during the January 2007 transfer window, but made only one appearance, as a substitute, in the Conference.

After a trial with Northampton Town Howe was given a short-term contract with the club in July 2007, but manager Stuart Gray released him before the start of the season, feeling that he had little chance of breaking into a strengthened side. A few weeks afterwards, Howe signed for Conference North side Kettering Town but found first team opportunities limited and signed for his local club Welling United a few months later. Howe finished the 2007–08 season with Welling but left when manager Andy Ford told him he could not guarantee him first-team football for the coming season. Howe played reserve games for Crystal Palace towards the end of the 2007–08 season as part of a trial which proved unsuccessful. In August 2008 Howe joined Fisher Athletic, where he was appointed captain. He played a reserve game on trial for Gillingham in December 2008, then signed for Croydon Athletic in February 2009 before rejoining Ebbsfleet United in October 2010 after the problems faced by Croydon Athletic. Howe has become an integral part of Liam Daish's Conference National team and has attracted the attention of a host of League One and League Two clubs. Howe picked up four club player of the year trophies (including Manager's) at the end of the season awards. On 15 June 2016, Howe signed for Bromley.

In June 2019, Howe signed for St Albans City. He was then loaned out to Hendon F.C. on 28 November 2019.
