= Sam Page (footballer) =

English footballer

Personal information
- Full name: Sam Terry Page
- Date of birth: 30 October 1987 (age 38)
- Place of birth: Croydon, England
- Positions: Left back; central defender

Team information
- Current team: Chipstead

Youth career
- Crystal Palace

Senior career*
Years	Team	Apps	(Gls)
2006–2008	Milton Keynes Dons	1	(0)
2006	→ Aylesbury United (loan)		
2006	→ Aylesbury United (loan)		
2007	→ Hendon (loan)	3	(1)
2007	→ Cambridge United (loan)	8	(0)
2007	→ Walton & Hersham (loan)		
2007	→ Hendon (loan)		
2008	→ Rushden & Diamonds (loan)	0	(0)
2007	→ Hendon (loan)		
2009–2010	Horsham		
2010–2011	Sutton United	86	(9)
2012	Havant & Waterlooville	12	(0)
2012–2013	Staines Town		
2013–2017	Kingstonian		
2017–	Chipstead		
- * Club domestic league appearances and goals

Sam Terry Page (born 30 October 1987 in Croydon) is an English footballer who plays for Chipstead.

== Career ==
Page was associated with Crystal Palace in his mid-teens, but started his senior career with Milton Keynes Dons in November 2006 as he made his debut for the team against Brighton & Hove Albion, in which he scored their goal in a 4–1 defeat. He had loan spells at Aylesbury United both during the 2005–06 season, and at the start of the 2006–07 season. He joined Hendon on loan in late September 2006, scoring on his debut. In February 2007 he moved to Cambridge United on a month's loan. This loan was extended until the end of the 2006–07 season in March. He returned to Hendon on a month's loan in October 2007, after a spell with Walton & Hersham. This was extended in November. In January 2008 he made an appearance in the Hillier Senior Cup for Rushden & Diamonds. Despite scoring a goal in his combined debut and final game, he failed to win an extension to the contract. Instead, a few days later he signed another loan deal with Hendon, until the end of the season. He moved on to Horsham on a 12-month contract the following season, to reduce his travelling time.

Page signed for Sutton United during the 2010 close season, and played 50 games to help the side win the 2010–11 Isthmian League Premier Division title. On 8 June 2012 it was announced Page signed for Conference South side Havant and Waterlooville. Later moves include Staines Town in December 2018, Kingstonian in June 2013, and most recently Chipstead in November 2017.

== Personal life ==
Sam Page played alongside his younger brother and former Leyton Orient player, Jack, at Horsham. Their father Terry is a former footballer for Crawley Town.
