= Kieran Murphy (footballer) =

English footballer

Personal information
- Full name: Kieran Thomas Murphy
- Date of birth: 21 December 1987 (age 38)
- Place of birth: Kingston upon Thames, England
- Height: 5 ft 11 in (1.80 m)
- Position: Defender

Team information
- Current team: Chertsey Town

Youth career
- Milton Keynes Dons

Senior career*
| Years | Team | Apps | (Gls) |
| 2006–2008 | Milton Keynes Dons | 3 | (0) |
| 2006 | → Aylesbury United F.C. (loan) | 14 | (0) |
| 2006 | → Maidenhead United F.C. (loan) | 7 | (1) |
| 2007 | → Walton & Hersham F.C. (loan) | 14 | (0) |
| 2007 | → Crawley Town (loan) | 23 | (1) |
| 2008 | Ilkeston Town | 55 | (2) |
| 2008–???? | Carshalton Athletic | | |
| ????–2012 | Kingstonian | | |
| 2012–2013 | Hemel Hempstead Town | | |
| 2013–2017 | Hampton & Richmond Borough | | |
| 2017–2022 | Chesham United | 140 | (7) |
| 2022– | Chertsey Town | | |

International career
| 2006–2009 | Republic of Ireland U21 | 3 | (1) |
Medal record
Representing Great Britain
football
{{{1}}}
Universiade
| Silver medal – second place | 2013 Kazan | Football |
- * Club domestic league appearances and goals as of 29 August 2014

Kieran Thomas Murphy (born 21 December 1987) is an English professional footballer, who plays for Chertsey Town.

Previously at Milton Keynes Dons where he made his professional debut away to Brighton & Hove Albion, Murphy then got the chance to study at Loughborough University and stopped playing professional football. He joined Ilkeston Town F.C. before the start of the 2008–09 season and in his first year at the club picked up two separate player of the year awards and was selected to be team captain. Murphy also played for the first XI for the Loughborough Students Football Team in the Midland Football Combination. He played in the Universiade for Great Britain in 2011 and captained them in 2013.
