= Jamie Waite =

Thai footballer

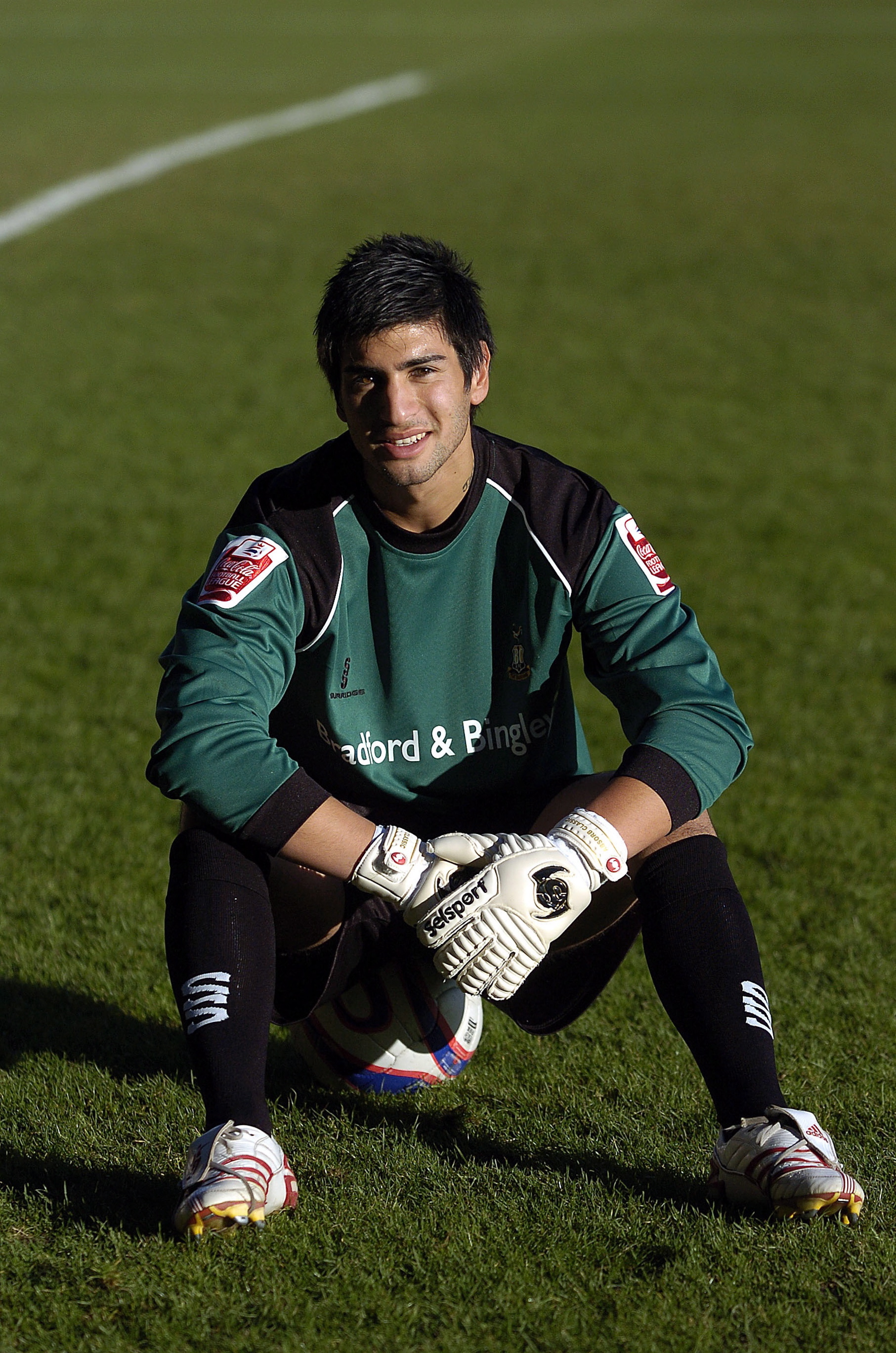

Personal information
- Full name: Jamie Waite
- Date of birth: 20 February 1986 (age 40)
- Place of birth: Plymouth, England
- Position: Goalkeeper

Youth career
- Ipswich Town
- Colchester United
- Fulham
- Ipswich Wanderers

Senior career*
Years	Team	Apps	(Gls)
2002–2003	Ipswich Wanderers		
2003–2004	Rotherham United	0	(0)
2004	Braintree Town		
2004	Leyton	2	(0)
2004	Woking	0	(0)
2004–2005	Kettering Town		
2005	Barrow	17	(0)
2005	Stevenage Borough		
2005–2006	Cambridge United		
2005	→ Chelmsford City (loan)	7	(0)
2006	Sudbury		
2006–2007	Milton Keynes Dons	3	(0)
2007	St Albans City	12	(0)
2007–2008	Bradford City	3	(0)
2008	→ Droylsden (loan)	2	(0)
2008	Doncaster Rovers	0	(0)
2009	Harlow Town		
2016–2017	Lowestoft Town		

International career
2002	Thailand	2	(0)
- * Club domestic league appearances and goals as of 23:54, 30 September 2008 (UTC)

Jamie Waite (born 20 February 1986) is a former professional footballer who played as a goalkeeper. Born in England, he represented the Thailand national team.

== Career ==
Born in Plymouth, Devon, Waite later moved to Coddenham, Suffolk. Waite represented Ipswich Town, Colchester United, Fulham and Ipswich Wanderers at youth level, appearing in and around the first team for the latter. Waite, the son of a British father and Thai mother, began his career as a junior in Thailand and made his debut for the national side aged just 15 years and 354 days when he came on as a second-half substitute in a game against Singapore in Bangkok.

His form for the Thai national team attracted the attention of Rotherham United with who Waite started a three-year scholarship in 2003. He left Rotherham after just one year and subsequently played for a number of clubs, including Braintree Town, Leyton and Woking, before joining Kettering Town, and then moving on to Barrow in January 2005.

He left Barrow to join Stevenage Borough in March 2005. He joined Cambridge United in August 2005, joining Chelmsford City on loan in September 2005 and moving to AFC Sudbury in January 2006.

Waite joined Milton Keynes Dons in July 2006. He was unable to break into the Dons first team and was released in January 2007. During his time at Milton Keynes found a cancer of the lymph glands and underwent a 10-month chemotherapy programme before being given the all-clear.

In August 2007, Waite signed on non-contract terms for Conference South side St Albans City, before moving to Bradford City on 21 November 2007 and playing in a reserve game on the same day against Hartlepool United. In March 2008 he joined Conference National side Droylsden on a loan deal. On 29 April 2008, Waite was deemed to be surplus to requirements at Valley Parade and was released by manager Stuart McCall along with 13 other Bradford players. He never featured for Bradford.

On 2 September 2008, he signed for Doncaster Rovers on a non-contract basis following a trial at the club. He was recommended to Doncaster by ex-player Barry Richardson after Waite was trained by him at Nottingham Forest. After less than a month with Rovers, he was released after failing to win a permanent contract. He signed for Harlow Town in the summer of 2009, and left the club later that year.

He joined Lowestoft Town ahead of the 2016–17 season.
